= The Man Who Won =

The Man Who Won may refer to:

- The Man Who Won (1919 film), an American silent film directed by Paul Scardon
- The Man Who Won (1923 film), an American silent film directed by William Wellman
