= His Own People =

1917 film by William P. S. Earle

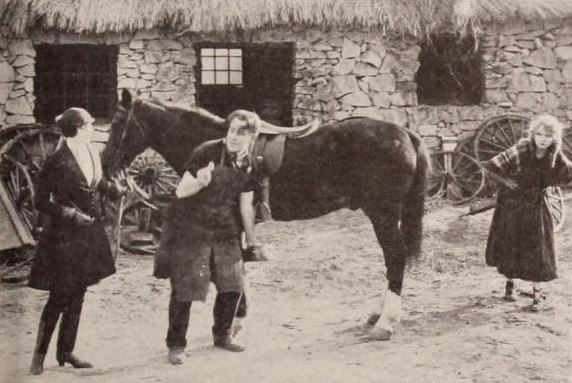
- Still of the film with Betty Blythe, Harry T. Morey, and Gladys Leslie
- Directed by: William P. S. Earle
- Story by: William Addison Lathrop
- Starring: Harry T. Morey; Gladys Leslie; Arthur Donaldson; William R. Dunn; Betty Blythe
- Cinematography: John W. Brown
- Production companies: Vitagraph Company of America; A Blue Ribbon Feature
- Distributed by: Vitagraph Company of America
- Release date: December 31, 1917
- Running time: 5 reels
- Country: United States
- Languages: Silent film (English intertitles)

His Own People is a 1917 American silent drama film directed by William P. S. Earle and starring Harry T. Morey, Gladys Leslie, Arthur Donaldson, William R. Dunn, and Betty Blythe. The film was released by Vitagraph Company of America on December 31, 1917.

== Cast ==
- Harry T. Morey as Hugh O'Donnell (as Harry Morey)
- Gladys Leslie as Molly Conway
- Arthur Donaldson as Shamus Reilly
- William R. Dunn as Percival Cheltenham (as William Dunn)
- Betty Blythe as Lady Mary Thorne
- Stanley Dunn as Patrick McCormack

== Preservation ==
The film is now considered lost.
