= Whom the Gods Destroy (1916 film) =

1916 film produced by Vitagraph

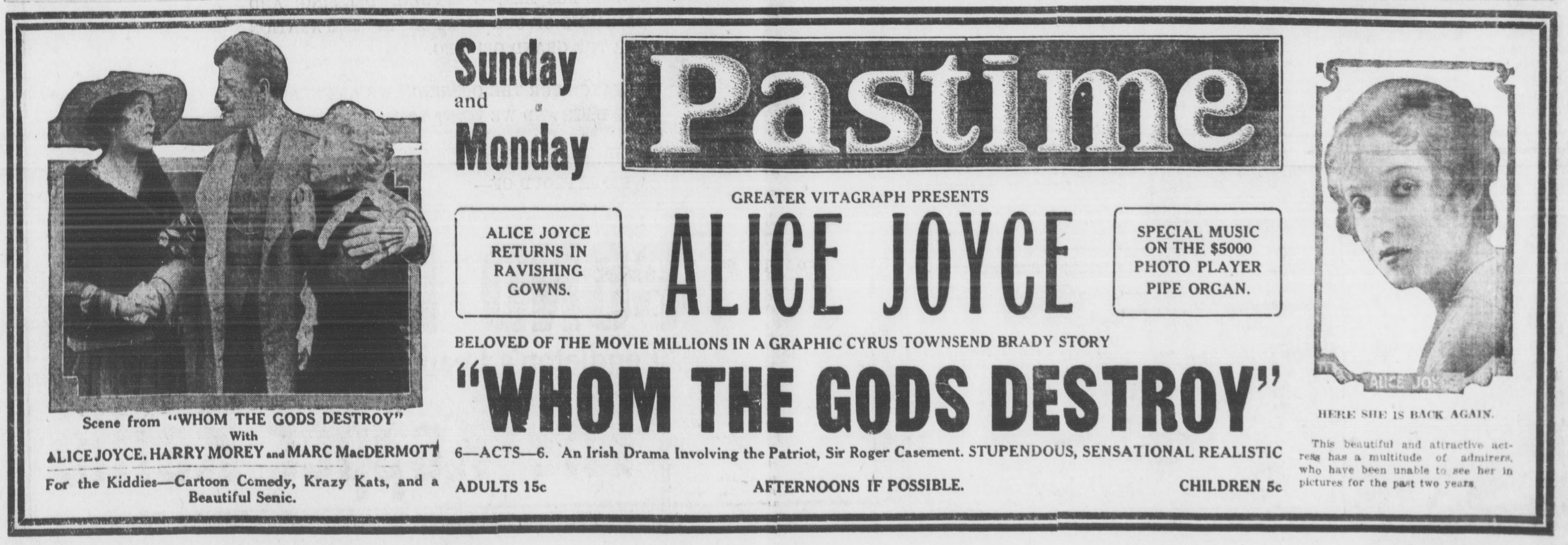
- Contemporary advertisement
- Directed by: J. Stuart Blackton; Herbert Brenon; William P.S. Earle
- Written by: J. Stuart Blackton; Cyrus Townsend Brady
- Starring: Alice Joyce; Harry T. Morey; Marc McDermott
- Cinematography: Clark R. Nickerson
- Edited by: Paul F. Maschke
- Production company: Vitagraph Company of America
- Distributed by: V-L-S-E
- Release date: December 18, 1916
- Running time: 5 reels
- Country: United States
- Language: Silent (English intertitles)

Whom the Gods Destroy is a 1916 American silent drama film directed by J. Stuart Blackton and Herbert Brenon and starring Alice Joyce, Harry T. Morey, and Marc McDermott. A tale set during the 1916 Irish Easter Rebellion against British rule.

== Cast ==
- Alice Joyce as Mary 'Mar' O'Neil
- Harry T. Morey as Leslie St. George Leigh
- Marc McDermott as Sir Denis Esmond
- Logan Paul as O'Neil
- Charles Kent as Father McCarthy
- Thomas R. Mills as The King of England
- Mary Maurice as Lady Esmond
- Bernard Siegel as Carl

== Bibliography ==
- Donald W. McCaffrey & Christopher P. Jacobs. Guide to the Silent Years of American Cinema. Greenwood Publishing, 1999. ISBN 0-313-30345-2
