= Beloved Impostor (disambiguation) =

Beloved Impostor may refer to:

- The Beloved Impostor, the 1918 American silent drama film
- Beloved Imposter, the 1936 British musical film
- Beloved Impostor, the 1961 German comedy film
