= The Charming Deceiver =

1921 film

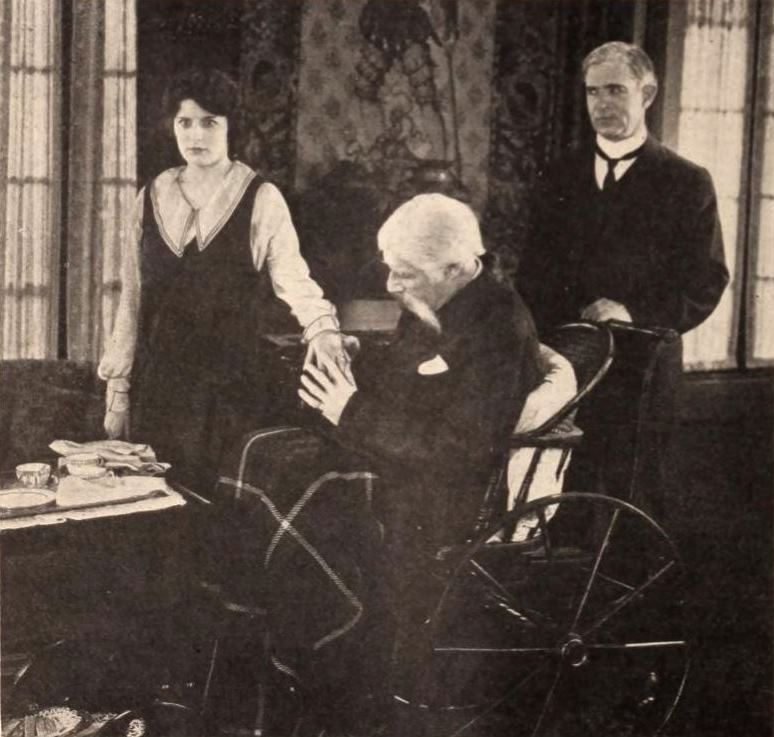
- Directed by: George L. Sargent
- Written by: Mrs. Owen Bronson (short story); Fred Schaefer
- Starring: Alice Calhoun; Charles Kent; Robert Gaillard
- Cinematography: Vincent Scully
- Production company: Vitagraph Company of America
- Distributed by: Vitagraph Company of America
- Release date: March 1921
- Running time: 50 minutes
- Country: United States
- Languages: Silent; English intertitles

The Charming Deceiver is a 1921 American silent drama film directed by George L. Sargent and starring Alice Calhoun, Charles Kent and Robert Gaillard.

== Cast ==
- Alice Calhoun as Edith Denton Marsden
- Jack McLean as Frank Denton
- Charles Kent as John Adams Stanford
- Eugene Acker as Don Marsden
- Roland Bottomley as Richard Walling
- Robert Gaillard as Duncan

== Bibliography ==
- Connelly, Robert B. The Silents: Silent Feature Films, 1910-36, Volume 40, Issue 2. December Press, 1998.
- Munden, Kenneth White. The American Film Institute Catalog of Motion Pictures Produced in the United States, Part 1. University of California Press, 1997.
