= The Maelstrom =

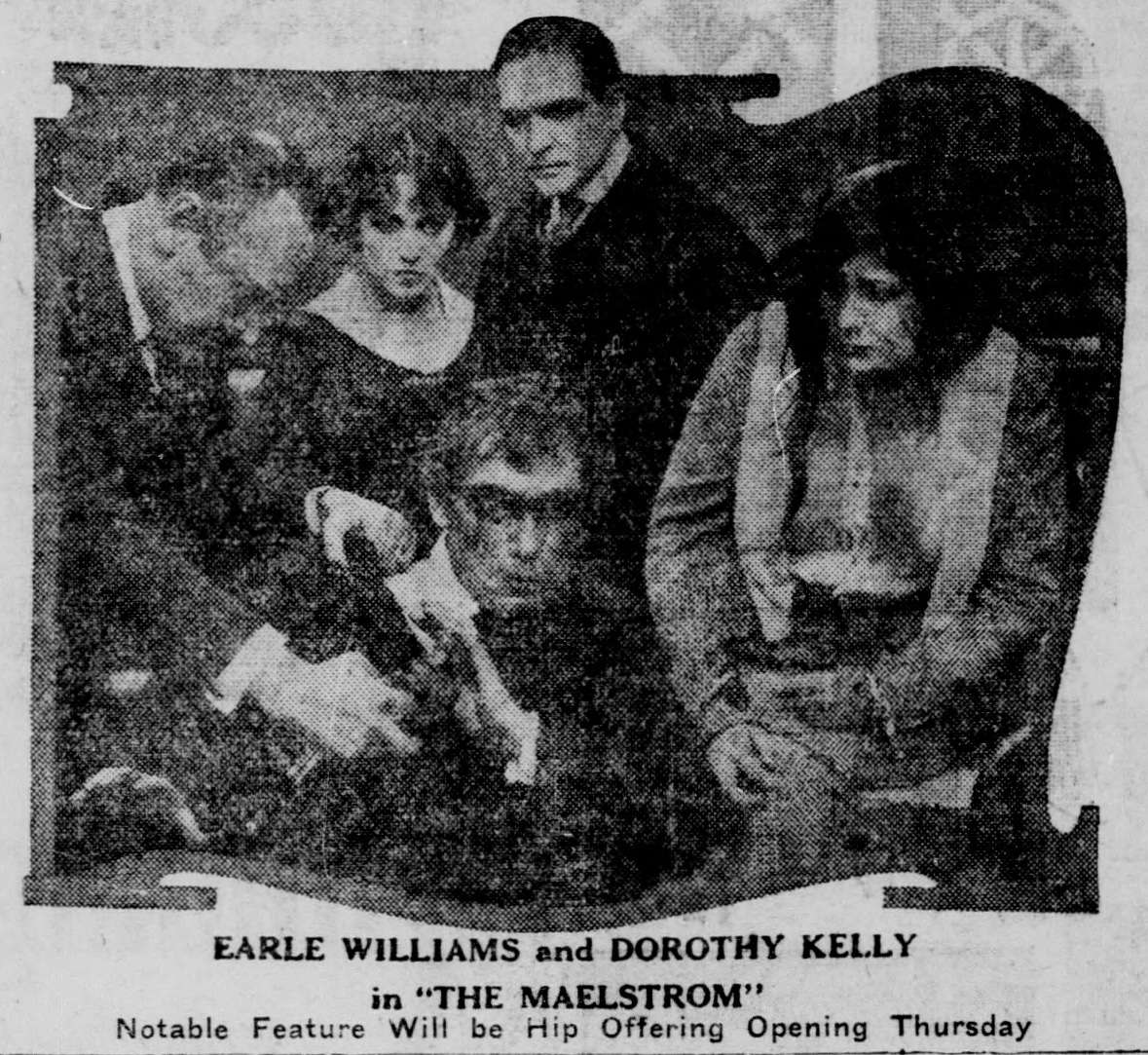
- Publicity photograph
- Directed by: Paul Scardon
- Written by: Garfield Thompson; Edward J. Montagne
- Based on: Novel The Maelstrom by Frank Froest c.1916
- Produced by: Thomas H. Ince; Vitagraph Company of America
- Starring: Dorothy Kelly; Earle Williams; Julia Swayne Gordon
- Cinematography: Robert A. Stuart
- Distributed by: Greater Vitagraph (V-L-S-E, Incorporated)
- Release date: June 18, 1917
- Running time: 5 reels
- Country: USA
- Languages: Silent, English titles

The Maelstrom is a 1917 silent film drama directed by Paul Scardon. It stars Dorothy Kelly, Earle Williams and Julia Swayne Gordon. Thomas Ince produced along with the Vitagraph Company.

== Cast ==
- Dorothy Kelly – Peggy Greye-Stratton
- Earle Williams – Jimmie Hallet
- Julia Swayne Gordon – Gwennie Lyne
- Gordon Gray – Cincinnati Red
- Bernard Siegel – Dago Sam
- Denton Vane – Ling
- John S. Robertson
- Robert Gaillard
- Frank Crayne

== Preservation status ==
A print is preserved in the Library of Congress collection Packard Campus for Audio-Visual Conservation.
