= Robert Gaillard =

American actor, film director

- Born: November 14, 1868; Adrian, Michigan, U.S.
- Died: September 24, 1941 (aged 72); Glendale, California, U.S.
- Occupations: Actor, writer, director
- Years active: 1909–1932 (film)

Robert Gaillard (November 14, 1868 – September 24, 1941) was an American male actor who appeared on stage and in film. He also directed a number of films during the silent era.

== Selected filmography ==
=== Actor ===
- The Voiceless Message (1911)
- Cardinal Wolsey (1912)
- As You Like It (1912)
- The Lion's Bride (1913)
- Mr. Barnes of New York (1914)
- The Man Who Couldn't Beat God (1915)
- The Two Edged Sword (1916)
- The Surprises of an Empty Hotel (1916)
- Indiscretion (1917)
- The Maelstrom (1917)
- Within the Law (1917)
- The Courage of Silence (1917)
- The Message of the Mouse (1917)
- The Grell Mystery (1917)
- The Stolen Treaty (1917)
- The Green God (1918)
- Hoarded Assets (1918)
- The Golden Goal (1918)
- The Adventure Shop (1919)
- In Honor's Web (1919)
- The Man Who Won (1919)
- Silent Strength (1919)
- The Broadway Bubble (1920)
- The Flaming Clue (1920)
- The Birth of a Soul (1920)
- What's Your Reputation Worth? (1921)
- The Charming Deceiver (1921)
- Princess Jones (1921)
- Christopher Columbus (1923)
- The Wreck of the Singapore (1928)
- Baleydier (1932)

=== Director ===
- Some Good in All (1911)
- Mr. Barnes of New York (1914)
- The Man Who Couldn't Beat God - co-director (1915)

== Bibliography ==
- Leonhard Gmür. Rex Ingram: Hollywood's Rebel of the Silver Screen. Impressum, 2013.
