= Birds of a Feather (1917 film) =

1917 film

- Written by: H. M. Walker
- Produced by: Hal Roach
- Starring: Harold Lloyd
- Release date: October 7, 1917
- Running time: 10 minutes
- Country: United States
- Language: Silent with English intertitles

Birds of a Feather is a 1917 American short comedy film featuring Harold Lloyd. It is considered a lost film.

== Cast ==
- Harold Lloyd as Lonesome Luke
- Snub Pollard
- Bebe Daniels
- Gilbert Pratt
- Billy Fay
- Bud Jamison
- Charles Stevenson (as Charles E. Stevenson)
- Sammy Brooks
- Dorothea Wolbert
- Lottie Case
- Max Hamburger
- W.L. Adams
- David Voorhees
- Fred C. Newmeyer
- Denton Vane

== Reception ==
In a review on October 13, 1917, Motion Picture News wrote that the film was a "fast and furious and funny stride that never abates in any of its departments."

== See also ==
- List of American films of 1917
