= Some Good in All =

- Directed by: Maurice Costello; Robert Gaillard
- Production company: Vitagraph Company of America
- Distributed by: General Film Company
- Release date: December 25, 1911 (U.S.)
- Running time: 10 minutes
- Country: United States

Some Good in All or A Thief in the Night is a 1911 American drama silent black and white short film directed by Maurice Costello and Robert Gaillard and starring Dolores Costello.

== Plot ==
A wealthy widowed businessman and his seven year old daughter Betty live in a massive house, but he has an enemy who threatens to throw him in prison via forged documents. The story begins with John Lane receiving a letter from Ben Hartley, who demands to be paid $10,000 by midnight. Lane doesn't have the amount on hand and has no way of getting it, and so he chooses to commit suicide. Just as he's about to pull the trigger, a burglar breaks into the house and stops him. The burglar enters the little girl's bedroom, and her sweet sleeping form awakens his kinder nature. He returns to Lane's room and convinces him to stay alive for his daughter, who is undisturbed. Lane pulls out the letter to the burglar, named Bill, and explains his situation, just as Ben Hartley rings the doorbell. Bill tells Lane that he will deal with Ben Hartley, and Lane lets him into the library. Bill reveals himself and holds them both up, forces them into a closet, and steals Ben's wallet that contains the blackmail material. Lane is given the papers, which he destroys and then orders Hartley to leave. Little Betty is woken by the noise, and rushes downstairs where she is embraced by her father, as Bill the burglar looks on through the window.

== Cast ==
- Maurice Costello as Bill - a Providential Thief
- Van Dyke Brooke as Ben Hartley - a Blackmailer
- Robert Gaillard as John Lane
- Dolores Costello as Betty Lane - John's Daughter
