= The Grell Mystery =

1917 film directed by Paul Scardon

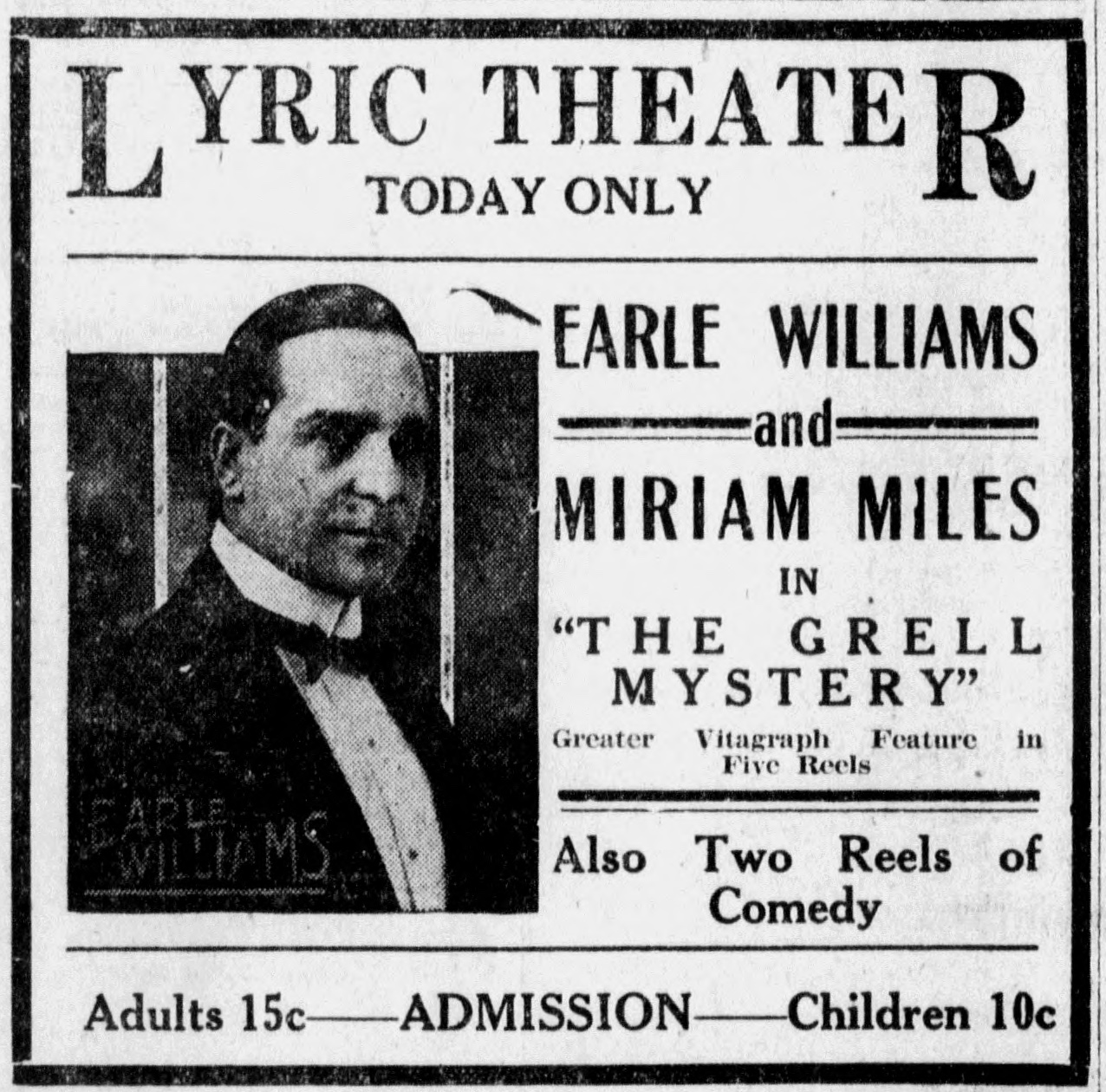
- Newspaper advertisement
- Directed by: Paul Scardon
- Written by: Graham Baker
- Based on: the novel, The Grell Mystery by Frank Froest
- Starring: Earle Williams; Miriam Miles; Jean Dunbar
- Cinematography: Robert A. Stuart
- Production company: Vitagraph
- Distributed by: V-L-S-E, Inc.
- Release date: November 19, 1917 (US)
- Running time: 5 reels
- Country: United States
- Language: English

The Grell Mystery is a 1917 American silent mystery film directed by Paul Scardon and written by Graham Baker. The film stars Earle Williams, Miriam Miles, and Jean Dunbar.

== Cast list ==
- Earle Williams as Heldon Foyle
- Miriam Miles as Helen Meredith
- Jean Dunbar as Eileen Meredith
- Denton Vane as Robert Grell/Harry Goldenberg
- Mabel Trunnelle as Lola
- Frank Crayne as Ralph Fairfield
- Bernard Siegel as Ivan
- Robert Gaillard as Detective Green
