= Harry T. Morey =

American actor (1873–1936)

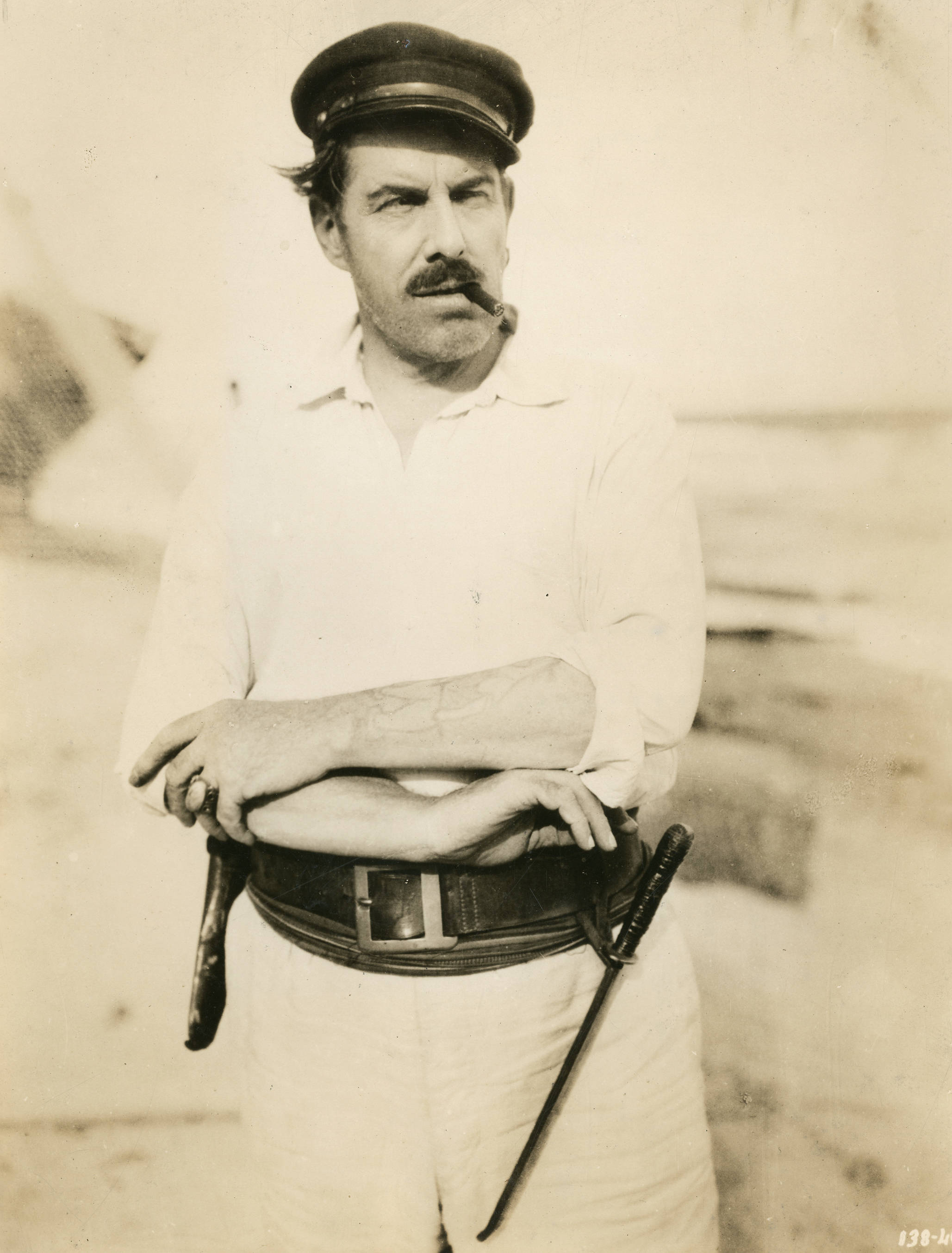
- Morey in 1923
- Born: Harry Temple Morey; September 21, 1873; Charlotte, Michigan, U.S.
- Died: January 24, 1936 (aged 62); Brooklyn, New York, U.S.
- Education: University of Michigan
- Occupation: Actor
- Years active: 1890–1935

Harry Temple Morey (August 21, 1873 – January 24, 1936) was an American stage and motion picture actor who appeared in nearly 200 films during his career.

== Biography ==
Born in Charlotte, Michigan, Morey had two brothers. Their mother was Addie C. Morey. He attended the University of Michigan, where he had his first acting experience. It stirred his interest enough that he went to New York to pursue a career in acting.

Morey began acting career on the stage. He performed at the Broadway Theatre with the Francis Wilson Opera Company in 1889, singing in addition to his dramatic roles.

In 1909, Morey joined the Vitagraph Film Company, making him a member the original Vitagraph stock company of actors. He had his first substantial film role in 1910, opposite actors Maurice Costello and Earle Williams in the Van Dyke Brooke-directed dramatic short Capital vs. Labor. He would spend the early 1910s appearing opposite such popular actors of the era as John Bunny, Flora Finch, Julia Swayne Gordon, Florence Turner, Edith Storey and William Shea.

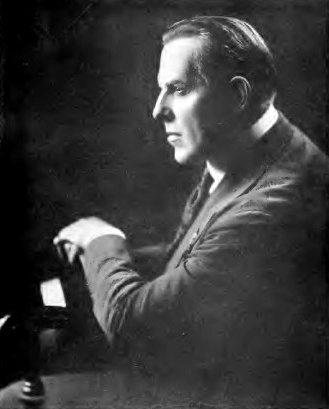
1920 promotional photograph

Morey would make his final film appearance in the 1934 Ralph Staub-directed comedy short Very Close Veins opposite actors Ben Blue and Shemp Howard.

Morey died of a pulmonary abscess in St. John's Hospital in Brooklyn, New York, in 1936, aged 63.

== Partial filmography ==
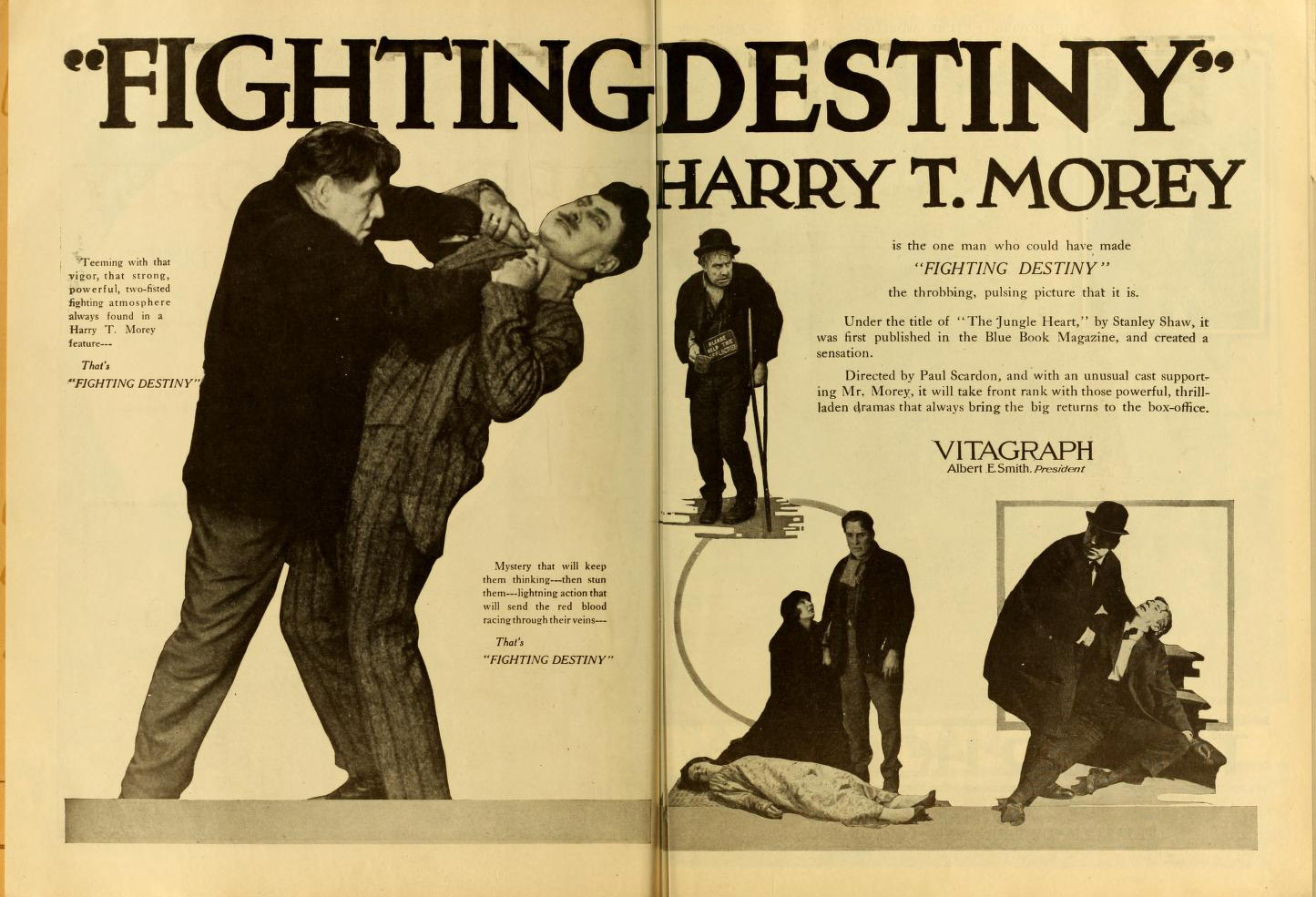
Fighting Destiny (1919)

- Ben Hur (1907), unverified role
- A Cure for Pokeritis (1912)
- As You Like It (1912)
- All for a Girl (1912)
- Red and White Roses (1913)
- Our Wives (1913)
- The Forgotten Latchkey (1913)
- Casey at the Bat (1913)
- The Lion's Bride (1913)
- My Official Wife (1914)
- A Million Bid (1914)
- The Making Over of Geoffrey Manning (1915)
- The Man Who Couldn't Beat God (1915)
- Crooky (1915)
- Salvation Joan (1916)
- Whom the Gods Destroy (1916)
- Richard the Brazen (1917)
- Within the Law (1917)
- The Courage of Silence (1917)
- His Own People (1917)
- Womanhood, the Glory of the Nation (1917)
- Tangled Lives (1918)
- The Green God (1918)
- Hoarded Assets (1918)
- The Golden Goal (1918)
- In Honor's Web (1919)
- The Man Who Won (1919)
- Silent Strength (1919)
- The Flaming Clue (1920)
- The Birth of a Soul (1920)
- The Sea Rider (1920)
- A Man's Home (1921)
- Beyond the Rainbow (1922)
- The Curse of Drink (1922)
- The Rapids (1922)
- Wildness of Youth (1922)
- The Empty Cradle (1923)
- Marriage Morals (1923)
- Where the Pavement Ends (1923)
- The Green Goddess (1923)
- Captain January (1924)
- The Painted Lady (1924)
- The Roughneck (1924)
- Heart of a Siren (1925)
- Barriers Burned Away (1925)
- The Adventurous Sex (1925)
- Camille of the Barbary Coast (1925)
- Headlines (1925)
- Aloma of the South Seas (1926)
- Under the Tonto Rim (1928)
- The Fifty-Fifty Girl (1928)
- The Return of Sherlock Holmes (1929)
- The Shadow Laughs (1933)
