= In Honor's Web =

1919 film directed by Paul Scardon

- Directed by: Paul Scardon
- Written by: Sam Taylor (scenario); Perry N. Vekroff (story)
- Starring: Harry T. Morey; Gladden James; George Backus
- Cinematography: Robert A. Stuart
- Production company: Vitagraph
- Release date: November 1919 (US)
- Running time: 5 reels
- Country: United States
- Language: English

In Honor's Web is a 1919 American silent drama film directed by Paul Scardon, written by Sam Taylor (scenario) and Perry N. Vekroff (story). The film stars Harry T. Morey, Gladden James, and George Backus.

== Cast list ==
- Harry T. Morey as Frank Powell
- Gladden James as Bert Powell
- George Backus as Carroll Carson
- Agnes Ayres as Irene Carson
- Myrtle Stedman as Olive Meade
- George Majeroni as Rodney Foster
- Bernard Siegel as Norman Cobb
- Robert Gaillard as Matt Turner

== Preservation ==
The film is now lost.
