= Within the Law (1917 film) =

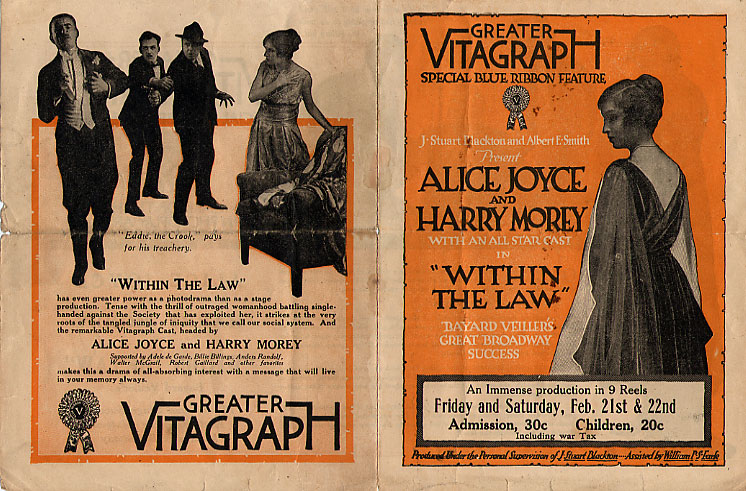
- Advertisement
- Directed by: William P.S. Earle
- Written by: Eugene Mullin
- Based on: Within the Law; 1912 play by Bayard Veiller
- Produced by: J. Stuart Blackton
- Starring: Alice Joyce; Harry T. Morey; Adele DeGarde
- Cinematography: Clark R. Nickerson
- Edited by: Viola Lawrence
- Production company: Vitagraph Company of America
- Distributed by: V-L-S-E
- Release date: April 29, 1917
- Running time: 90 minutes
- Country: United States
- Language: Silent (English intertitles)

Within the Law is a 1917 American silent crime drama film directed by William P.S. Earle and starring Alice Joyce, Harry T. Morey, and Adele DeGarde.

== Cast ==
- Alice Joyce as Mary Turner
- Harry T. Morey as Joe Garson
- Adele DeGarde as Aggie Lynch
- Anders Randolf as Mr. Gilder
- Walter McGrail as Dick Gilder
- Eugene O'Rourke as Insp. Burke
- Billie Billings as Helen Morris
- Grace Bunce as Sarah
- Joseph Donohue as Det. Cassidy
- Bernard Randall as English Eddie
- Bernard Siegel as Tom Dacey
- Robert Gaillard as Dist. Atty. Demarest

== Censorship ==
Before Within the Law could be exhibited in Kansas, the Kansas Board of Review required the removal of the scenes where the chief applied the third degree to two accomplices, the chief paying a stool-pigeon, an intertitle saying "Damn the law," and an intertitle explaining why Mary didn't get time off for good behavior.

== Bibliography ==
- Donald W. McCaffrey & Christopher P. Jacobs. Guide to the Silent Years of American Cinema. Greenwood Publishing, 1999. ISBN 0-313-30345-2
