= Hoarded Assets =

1918 film directed by Paul Scardon

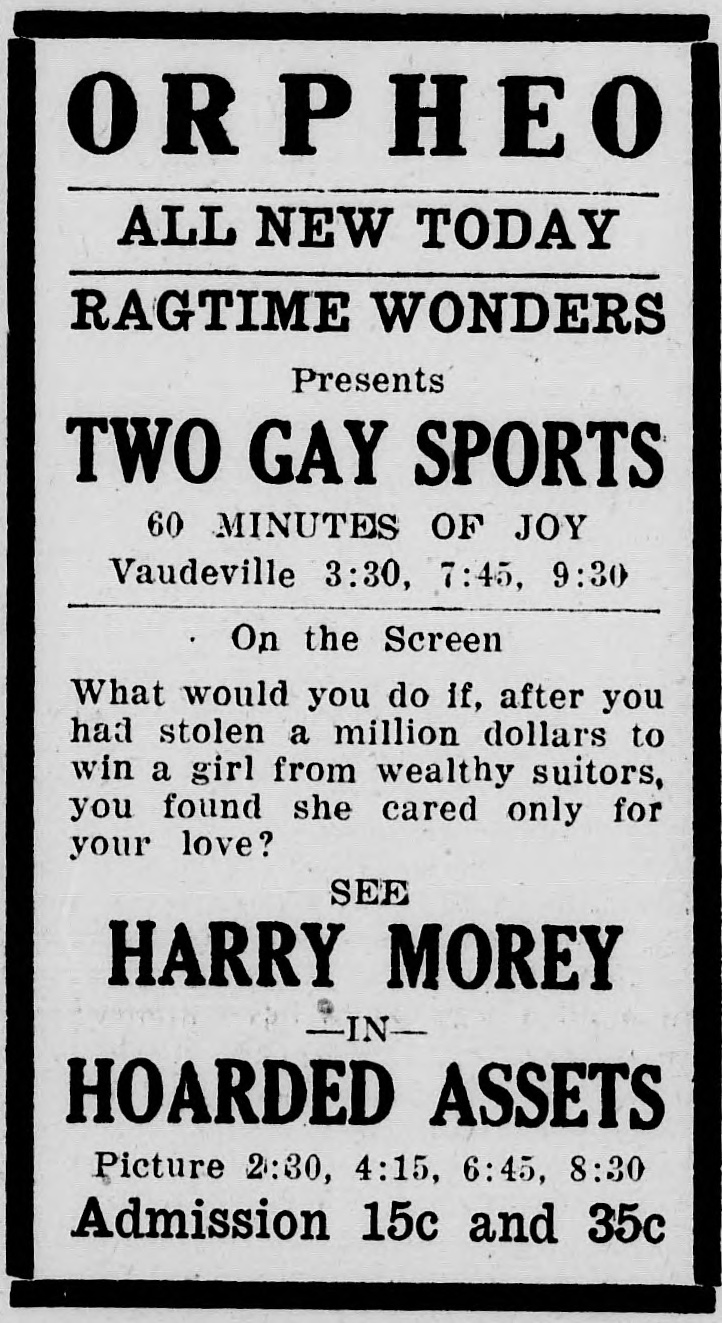
- Contemporary newspaper advertisement
- Directed by: Paul Scardon
- Written by: Edward J. Montagne; Garfield Thompson
- Based on: the 1918 short story, Hoarded Assets by Raymond Smiley Spears
- Produced by: Albert E. Smith
- Starring: Harry T. Morey; Betty Blythe; George Majeroni
- Production company: Vitagraph
- Distributed by: Greater Vitagraph, Inc.
- Release date: December 23, 1918 (US)
- Running time: 5 reels
- Country: United States
- Language: English

Hoarded Assets is a 1918 American silent drama film directed by Paul Scardon and written by Edward J. Montagne and Garfield Thompson. The film stars Harry T. Morey, Betty Blythe, and George Majeroni.

== Cast list ==
- Harry T. Morey as Jerry Rufus
- Betty Blythe as Claire Dawson
- George Majeroni as James Barr
- Robert Gaillard as Detective Ryan
- Jean Paige as Patsy
- Bernard Siegel
