= The Flaming Clue =

1920 film directed by Edwin L. Hollywood

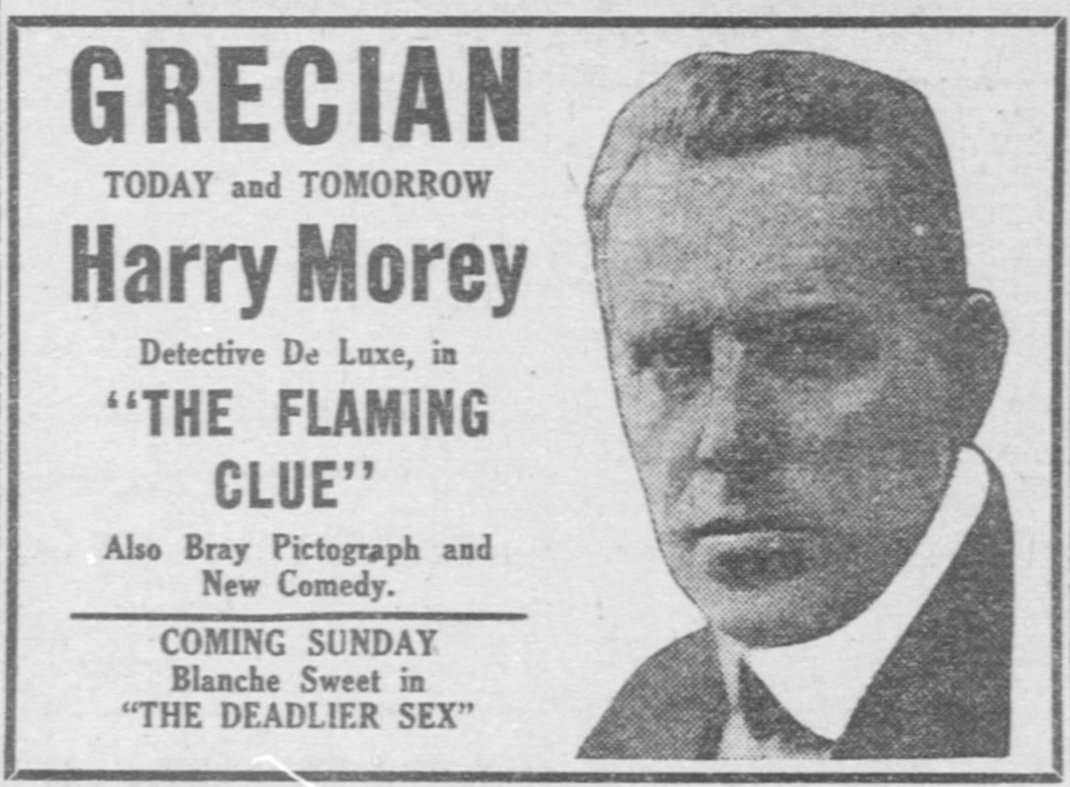
- Contemporary newspaper advertisement
- Directed by: Edwin L. Hollywood
- Written by: William B. Courtney; Frederic Van Rensselaer Dey
- Starring: Harry T. Morey; Lucy Fox; Sidney Dalbrook
- Cinematography: Robert Stuart
- Production company: Vitagraph
- Release date: March 22, 1920 (US)
- Running time: 5 reels
- Country: United States
- Language: English

The Flaming Clue is a 1920 American silent drama film directed by Edwin L. Hollywood and written by William B. Courtney and Frederic Van Rensselaer Dey. The film stars Harry T. Morey, Lucy Fox, and Sidney Dalbrook.

== Plot ==
Secret Service agent Ralph Cornell is on the trail of a ring of counterfeiters. He tracks them to a boarding house in the country which is owned by Betty Quail and her mother. The head of the gang, Aaron Prine, is staying at the boarding house, where the counterfeiters have a secret lair which can be entered through a secret passage in Prine's room.

In order to keep an eye on Prine, Cornell registers as a resident at the boarding house, during which time he and Betty fall in love. As he is closing in on the counterfeiters, he and Betty are captured and held captive. But the Secret Service arrives in time to rescue Cornell and Betty, and arrest the criminals.

== Cast ==
- Harry T. Morey as Ralph Cornell
- Lucy Fox as Betty Quail
- Sidney Dalbrook as Aaron Prine
- Jack McLean as Jimmie Quail
- Eleanor Barry as Mrs. Quail
- R. E. Milasch as Lassiter
- Robert Gaillard as King
- Bernard Siegel as Rabeet
- Frank Evans as Vielkon

== Production ==
In preparation for the picture, Harry T. Morley shadowed a New York City detective to learn more about the ins and out of police work. The picture was based on a story from the files of the United States Secret Service.

== Reception ==
The Lenora News gave the film a positive review, stating, "For a detective story with suspense, mystery and thrills in every scene see "The Flaming Clue". The Evening Mail also gave the film a good review and singled out the performance of Harry Morley, "Mr. Morley is a favorite with lovers of movies and his part in this picture gives him opportunity for superb acting. This picture tells a human life story and is thrilling throughout." The Cedar Rapids Evening Gazette said it was "a thrilling detective story, filled with love and suspense."
