= The Man Who Couldn't Beat God =

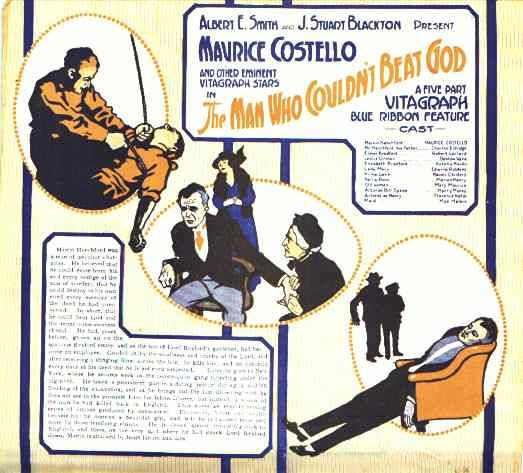
- Directed by: Maurice Costello; Robert Gaillard
- Written by: Harold Gilmore Calhoun
- Starring: Maurice Costello; Robert Gaillard; Denton Vane
- Cinematography: William H. McCoy
- Production company: Vitagraph
- Distributed by: V-L-S-E, Inc.
- Release date: October 18, 1915 (US)
- Running time: 5 reels
- Country: United States
- Language: Silent (English intertitles)

The Man Who Couldn't Beat God is a 1915 American silent film written by Harold Gilmore Calhoun and directed by Maurice Costello and Robert Gaillard. It stars Maurice Costello, Robert Gaillard, and Mary Charleson.

== Plot ==
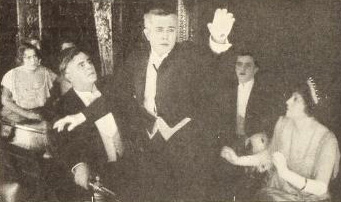
Scene from the film where Henchford is overcome with guilt

Martin Henchford is a laborer on an English estate. One night he is at a pub with several acquaintances when he begins to expound on his philosophy that there is no God, and there is no such thing as conscience. His polemic alarms and disturbs his companions, who shun him. Back on the estate he is accosted by landowner, Lord Rexford, who has always had an enmity towards Henchford, who he feels does not know his place. Things come to a head one day when Henchford refuses to carry out a demeaning task. In a rage, Rexford strikes him across the face with his riding crop. Henchford has had enough. That night he plots attack Rexford as he returns from a nearby estate. In the darkness he strings a rope across the road. As Rexford his riding home, his horse trips on the rope and throws Rexford, killing him. Henchford retrieves the rope and goes home.

The following day when the body is found, everyone assumes that the landowner had simply been killed when his horse threw him. Having gotten away with murder, Henchford makes plans to travel to America. He gains passage on a steamer, working his way across as a stoker in the boiler room. Once in New York, he gets a job as a sand hog, where is doing well until one day the tunnel begins to collapse, threatening to drown the crew. Henchford ensures that everyone makes it out alive, and as he is bringing the last man to the surface, he is overpowered by a vision of the man he murdered. .

As time goes on, he distinguishes himself further through hard work, rising through the ranks until he is made foreman, and finally put in charge of all construction. He also meets Elizabeth Bradford, the daughter of the construction company's owner, Elmer Bradford. The two fall in love and are married. The marriage ceremony is marred slightly when Henchford receives another vision of the murdered Rexford, superimposed over the face of the minister.

Time passes, and Henchford goes into politics, slowly rising through the ranks. However, he is continued to be plagued by visions of the dead Rexford. One night while at the theater watching a performance of Oliver Twist, he is overcome when he sees the dead man's vision superimposed over Bill Sikes as he murders Nancy. There are several other times when he suffers from these visions. Eventually he runs for governor of New York and is elected. However, the strains of the office combine with his guilty conscience cause him to have a nervous breakdown. Elizabeth begs him to take a vacation, and he agrees, booking a trip on an ocean liner headed for England. With him go his wife and father-in-law. Once back in England, he returns to the village where he grew up, there he is taken to bed by his illness. One night, driven by guilt, he sneaks out of the sickroom and visits the site where he killed Rexford years earlier. On the road, he sees a final vision of the murdered man, has a heart attack and dies.

== Cast list ==
- Maurice Costello as Martin Henchford
- Robert Gaillard as Elmer Bradford
- Denton Vane as Leslie Gilman
- Estelle Mardo as Elizabeth Bradford
- Edwina Robbins as Lady Mary
- Thomas Mills as Lord Rexford
- Marion Henry as Nellie Rose
- Naomi Childers as Hilma Lake
- Mary Maurice as Old woman
- Charles Eldridge as Mr. Henchford, Martin's father
- Harry T. Morey as Actor as Bill Sykes
- Florence Natol as Actress as Nancy
- Mae Halpin as maid
- Gladden James

== Production ==
Harold Gilmore Calhoun won second prize for his screenplay in a writing contest held by The Evening Sun in June 1914. Vitagraph announced the upcoming release of the picture in the September 25, 1915 issue of the Motion Picture News. In early October it was revealed that Maurice Costello was to star in the picture. Other cast members announced at the same time included Charles Eldridge, Thomas Mills, Robert Gaillard, Naomi Childers, Edwina Robbins, Estelle Mardo and Gladden James. The film was released on October 18, 1915.

== Reception ==
Motography gave the film a good review, complimenting the cast for their performances, and the efforts of the dual directors on the film, Costello and Gaillard. Variety also gave the film a good review. They felt the acting, cinematography and direction were all superior, but the plot was the weak point, starting well, but it "peters out through a wrong psychological premise". Moving Picture World gave the picture a good review, although they felt it did "not measure up to the best standards of Vitagraph blue ribbons." The complimented the acting and cinematography, feeling that some of the settings were splendid. However, they felt that the mob scenes were handled particularly well, and they felt there were several plot inconsistencies throughout the production. Motion Picture News gave the film a very good review, saying the directors and author "have turned out an un-usually good picture." They felt the picture was "dramatic without being theatric", and had a "strong human appeal". They felt many of the scenes were wonderful, however they did feel a minor weakness in Costello's ability to age throughout the film.
