= George Majeroni =

American actor

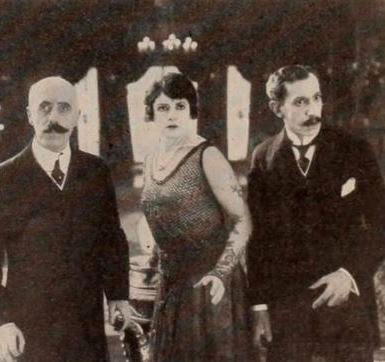
Majeroni (right) in The Caillaux Case (1918)

George Majeroni, also known as Giorgio Majeroni, (1877–1924) was a stage and screen actor. His starring roles in silent films included My Lady Incog opposite Hazel Dawn.

Majeroni was born in Melbourne, Australia and was part of a family of actors. His older brother Mario Majeroni was born in Sardinia and also came to the U.S.

His first performance in the U.S. was in 1905. He had a wife and two children. Majeroni died at Saranac Lake in New York's Adirondacks.

He portrayed Bolo Pasha in the 1918 film The Caillaux Case.

== Theater ==
- For the Term of His Natural Life, adaptation
- Laugh, Clown, Laugh
- An adaptation of The Kreutzer Sonata
- Top o' th' World
- The Claw (play)
- The Pink Lady
- Diplomacy (1914)

== Filmography ==
- The Sign of the Cross (1914)
- Bella Donna (1915)
- The Eternal City (1915)
- Diplomacy (1916)
- My Lady Incog (1916)
- The Feud Girl (1916)
- As in a Looking Glass (1916)
- Paying the Price (1916)
- Patria (serial) (1917)
- Who's Your Neighbor? (1917)
- Stranded in Arcady (1917)
- Tangled Lives (1918)
- The Caillaux Case (1918)
- The Green God (1918)
- Hoarded Assets (1918)
- The Woman the Germans Shot (1918)
- The Invisible Bond (1919)
- Marriage For Convenience (1919)
- In Honor's Web (1919)
- What Women Will Do (1921)
- How Women Love (1922)
