= Arsene Lupin (1917 film) =

1917 film

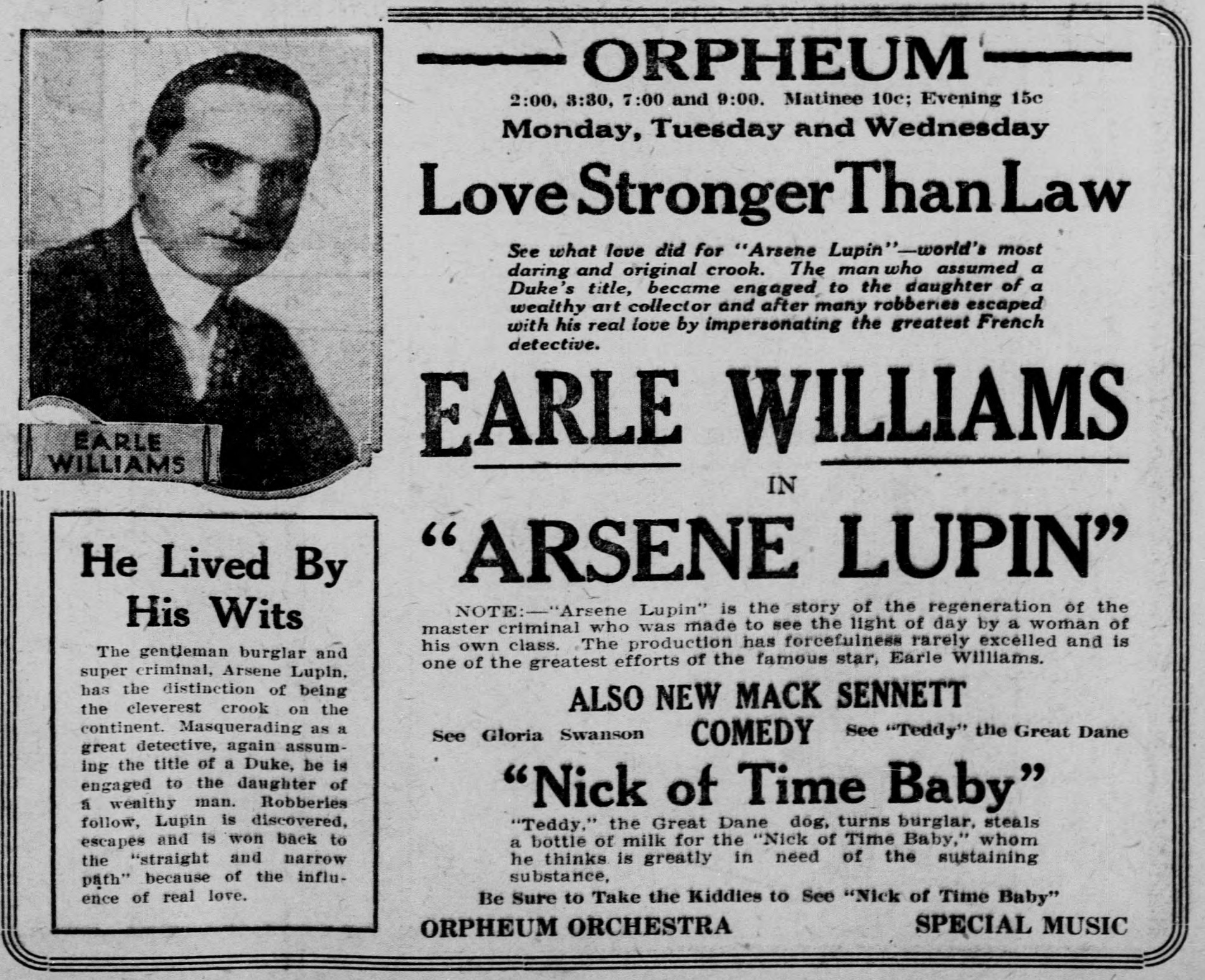
- Newspaper advertisement
- Directed by: Paul Scardon
- Written by: Francis de Croisset (play); Garfield Thompson
- Based on: Arsène Lupin; 1908 play by Maurice Leblanc; Francis de Croisset
- Starring: Earle Williams; Brinsley Shaw; Henry Leone
- Cinematography: Robert A. Stuart
- Production company: Vitagraph Company of America
- Distributed by: V-L-S-E
- Release date: March 12, 1917
- Running time: 50 minutes
- Country: United States
- Languages: Silent; English intertitles

Arsene Lupin is a lost 1917 American mystery film directed by Paul Scardon and starring Earle Williams, Brinsley Shaw and Henry Leone. The film is based on the character of the French gentleman thief Arsene Lupin.

== Cast ==
- Earle Williams as Arsene Lupin
- Brinsley Shaw as Guerchard
- Henry Leone as Guernay-Martin
- Bernard Siegel as Charolais
- Gordon Gray as Anastase
- Logan Paul as Firmin
- Hugh Wynn as Alfred
- Ethel Grey Terry as Sonia
- Billie Billings as Germaine
- Julia Swayne Gordon as Victoire
- Frank Crayne as Child

== Bibliography ==
- Backer, Ron. Mystery Movie Series of 1930s Hollywood. McFarland, 2012.
