= Silent Strength (film) =

1919 film directed by Paul Scardon

- Directed by: Paul Scardon
- Written by: Garfield Thompson; Lawrence McCloskey
- Starring: Harry T. Morey; Robert Gaillard; Betty Blythe
- Production company: Vitagraph
- Release date: February 17, 1919 (US)
- Running time: 5 reels
- Country: United States
- Language: English

Silent Strength is a 1919 American silent drama film directed by Paul Scardon and written by Garfield Thompson and Lawrence McCloskey. The film stars Harry T. Morey, Robert Gaillard, and Betty Blythe.

== Cast list ==
- Harry T. Morey as Dan La Roche/Henry Grozier
- Betty Blythe as Ruth Madison
- Robert Gaillard as Corporal Neville
- Bernard Siegel as Tom Tripp
- Herbert Pattee as Inspector Burke
- James Costello as Jenkins
