= The Stolen Treaty (1917 film) =

1917 film directed by Paul Scardon

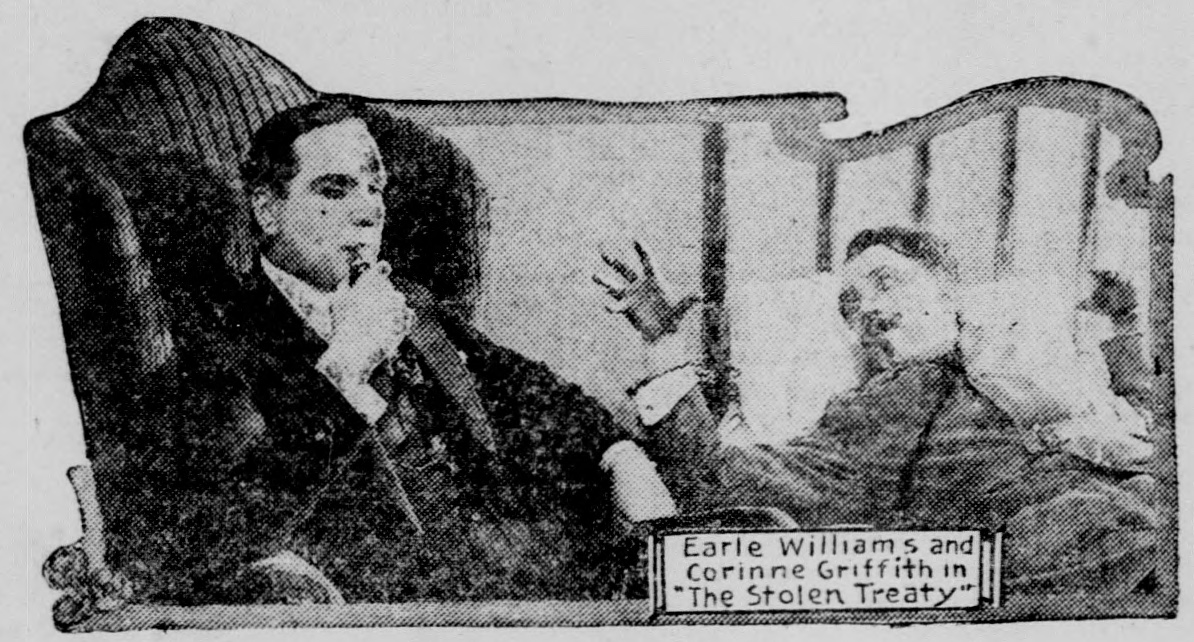
- Publicity photo in a contemporary newspaper
- Directed by: Paul Scardon
- Written by: Helmer Walton Bergman; Thomas Edgelow
- Starring: Earle Williams; Denton Vane; Bernard Seigel
- Production company: Vitagraph
- Distributed by: V-L-S-E, Inc.
- Release date: July 16, 1917 (US)
- Running time: 5 reels
- Country: United States
- Language: English

The Stolen Treaty is a 1917 American silent drama film directed by Paul Scardon and written by Helmer Walton Bergman and Thomas Edgelow. The film stars Earle Williams, Denton Vane, and Bernard Seigel.

== Cast list ==
- Earle Williams as Geoffrey Wynne
- Denton Vane as Prince Zarl
- Bernard Seigel as Riddle
- Robert Gaillard as Sec. of State
- Corinne Griffith as Irene Mitchell
- Billie Billings as Mrs. Leonori
- John Ellis as McMahon
