= Flesh and Spirit (film) =

- Directed by: Joseph Levering
- Written by: Garfield Thompson
- Starring: Belle Bennett; Walter Ringham; Denton Vane
- Cinematography: Joseph Levering
- Production company: United States Moving Picture Corporation
- Distributed by: Lee-Bradford Corporation
- Release date: June 1922
- Running time: 56 minutes
- Country: United States
- Languages: Silent; English intertitles

Flesh and Spirit is a 1922 American silent drama film directed by Joseph Levering and starring Belle Bennett, Walter Ringham and Denton Vane.

== Cast ==
- Belle Bennett as Truth Eldridge
- Walter Ringham as Donald Wallace
- Denton Vane as James Dale
- James McDuff as Reverend Howard Renfield
- Rita Rogan as Peggy
- Logan Paul as Peters Roberts
- Jean Robertson as Paula Roberts
- May Kitson as Mrs. Wallace
- Hayden Stevenson as The Gardener
- Mary Rehan as His wife

== Bibliography ==
- John T. Soister, Henry Nicolella & Steve Joyce. American Silent Horror, Science Fiction and Fantasy Feature Films, 1913-1929. McFarland, 2014.
