= The Lion's Bride =

1913 film by Frederick A. Thomson

- Directed by: Frederick A. Thomson
- Distributed by: General Film Company
- Release date: June 1913
- Country: United States
- Language: Silent

The Lion's Bride is a 1913 silent short film directed by Frederick A. Thomson.

== Plot ==
Christine is the daughter of the owner of a menagerie. She does not fear Nero, a lion grumpy with everyone, who is always docile and kind to her. She manages to make him do the most difficult exercises, enters the cage without fear, cuddles him like a kitten and he lets her do everything. One day, however, Christine meets Basil McDermott who begins to court her until he becomes engaged to her. Basil dislikes the lion and Nero dislikes the newcomer, even though he is forced to accept him as his master. On the day of the wedding, Christine wants to go greet her lion and enter the cage. Basil goes to look for her to bring her back among the guests, but she asks him to leave her alone to say goodbye to Nero. When Basil returns, he finds his wife lying dead between Nero's paws.

== Cast ==
- Julia Swayne Gordon: Christine Johnson
- Harry T. Morey: Basil McDermott, Christine Johnson's boyfriend
- Tefft Johnson: Mr. Johnson, Christine's father
- Mrs. E.M. Kimball (as Mrs. Kimball): Mrs. Johnson, Christine's mother
- Robert Gaillard: degenerate husband
- Nero the Lion: Nero
- Paul Kelly
- Adele DeGarde

== Production ==
The film was produced by the Vitagraph Company of America.

== Distribution ==
Released by the General Film Company, the film, a short film on a reel, was released in US theaters on June 23, 1913.
