= The Green God =

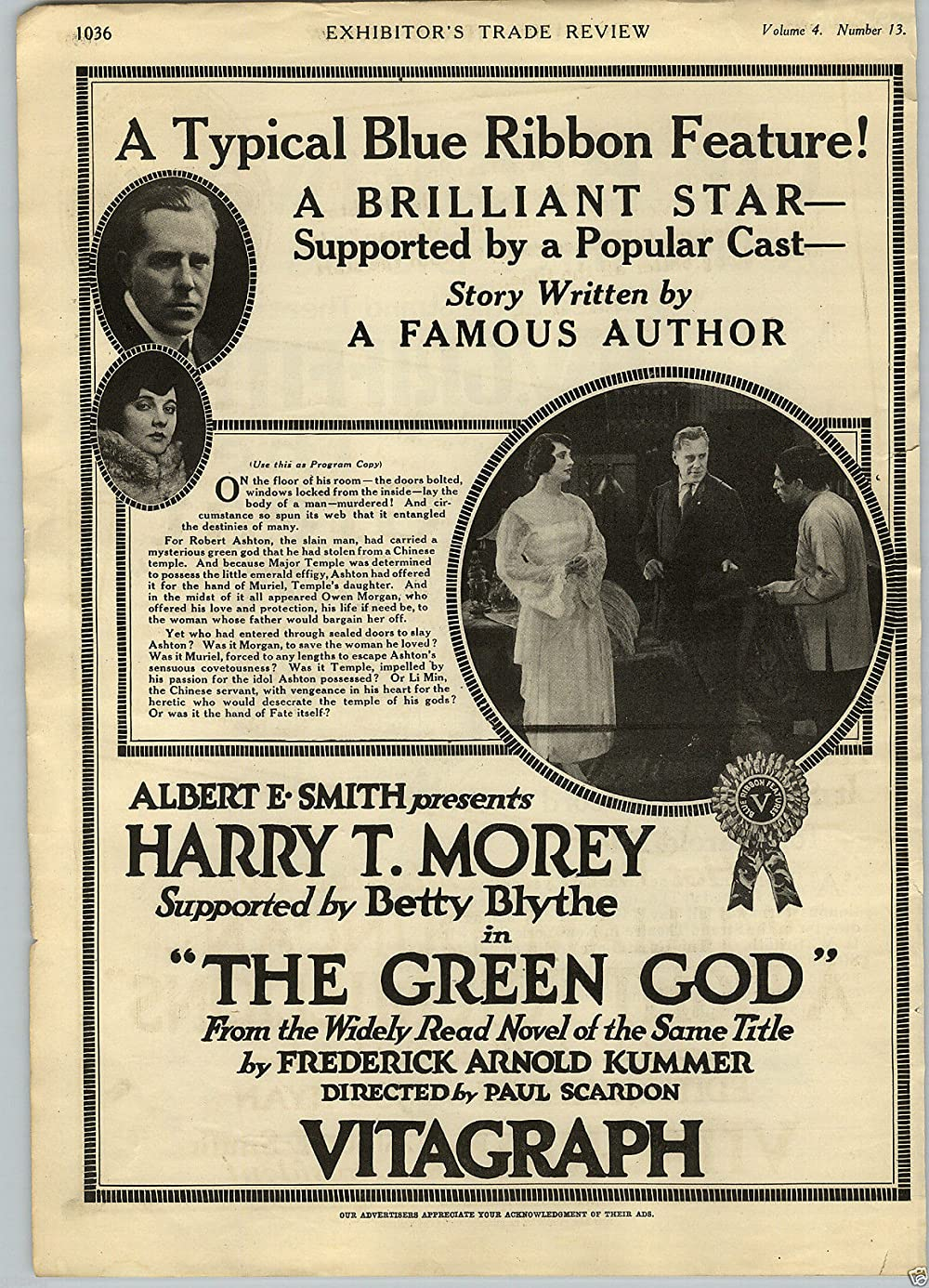
- Directed by: Paul Scardon
- Written by: Frederic Arnold Kummer (novel); Garfield Thompson
- Produced by: Albert E. Smith
- Starring: Harry T. Morey; Betty Blythe; Arthur Donaldson
- Cinematography: Robert A. Stuart
- Production company: Vitagraph Company of America
- Distributed by: V-L-S-E
- Release date: September 2, 1918
- Running time: 5 reels
- Country: United States
- Languages: Silent; English intertitles

The Green God is a 1918 American silent mystery film directed by Paul Scardon and starring Harry T. Morey, Betty Blythe and Arthur Donaldson.

== Cast ==
- Harry T. Morey as Owen Morgan
- Betty Blythe as Muriel Temple
- Arthur Donaldson as Major Temple
- George Majeroni as Robert Ashton
- Bernard Siegel as Li Min
- Robert Gaillard as McQuade
- Joseph Burke as Priest of Buddha

== Bibliography ==
- Goble, Alan. The Complete Index to Literary Sources in Film. Walter de Gruyter, 1999.
