= Miss Ambition =

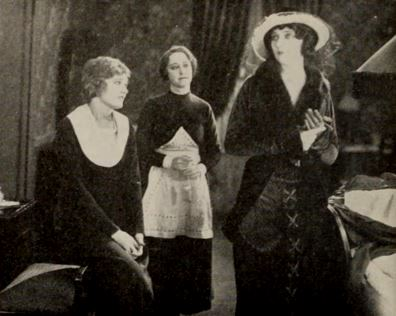
- a scene in the film
- Directed by: Henry Houry (aka Henry-Houry)
- Written by: George H. Plympton; Rex Taylor (story)
- Produced by: Albert E. Smith
- Starring: Corinne Griffith; Betty Blythe; Walter McGrail
- Cinematography: Arthur Ross
- Distributed by: Greater Vitagraph
- Release date: November 1918
- Running time: 5 reels
- Country: United States
- Language: Silent

Miss Ambition is a lost 1918 silent film directed by Henry Houry and starring in the leads Corinne Griffith, Betty Blythe and Walter McGrail. It was produced by Albert E. Smith and released through Greater Vitagraph.

== Cast ==
- Corinne Griffith - Marta
- Betty Blythe - Edith Webster
- Walter McGrail - Larry Boyle
- Fred Smith - Nowland Wells
- Denton Vane - John Norwood
- Templar Saxe - Dudley Kelland
- Harry Kendall - Blair
