= Denton Vane =

American film actor (1890–1940)

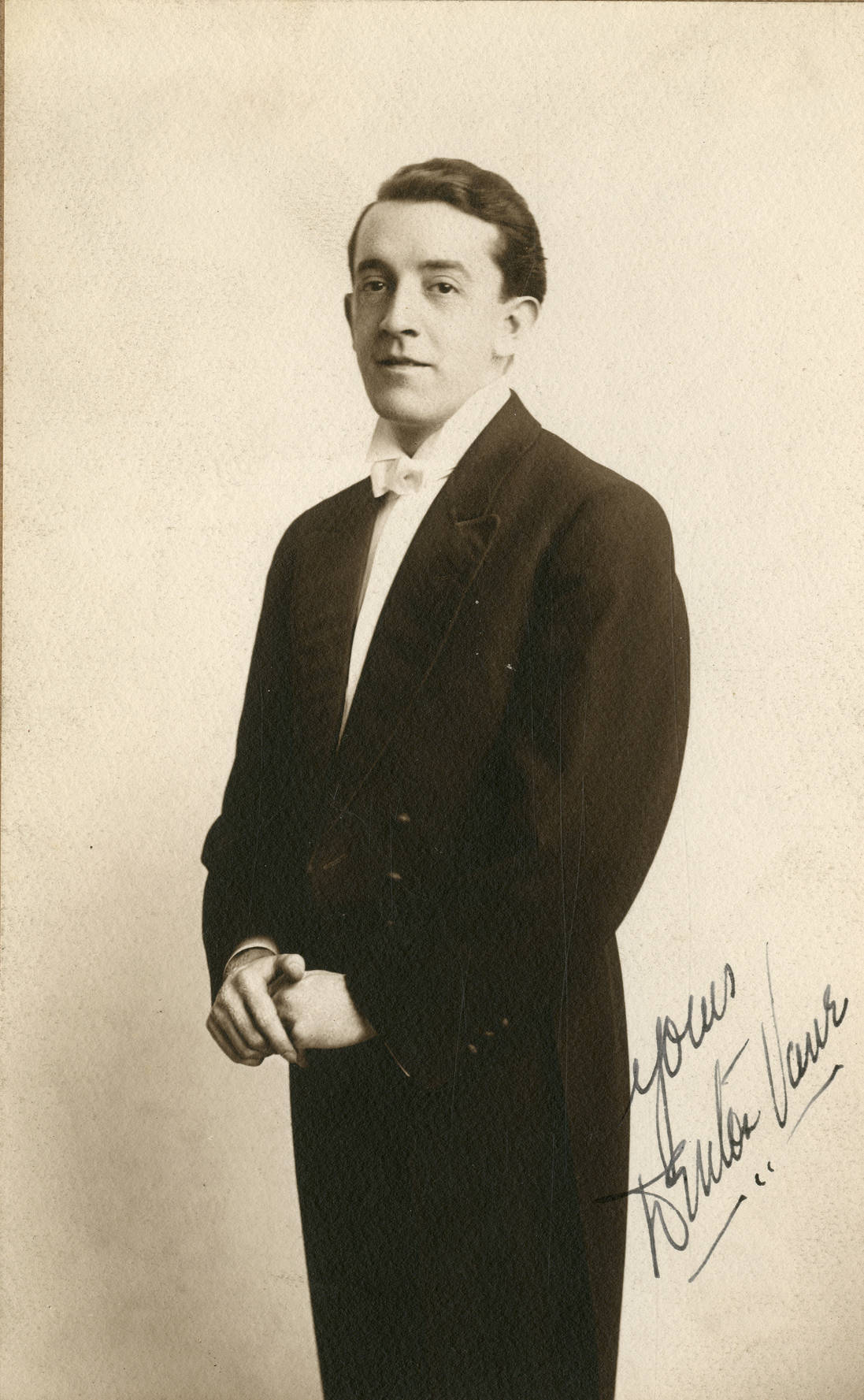
- Vane in 1911
- Born: 1890; Brooklyn, New York, U.S.
- Died: September 17, 1940 (aged 49–50); Union Hill, New Jersey, U.S.
- Occupation: Actor
- Years active: 1912–1922 (film)

Denton Vane (1890–September 17, 1940) was an American film actor of the silent era. He appeared in a number of films made by Vitagraph Studios.

== Selected filmography ==
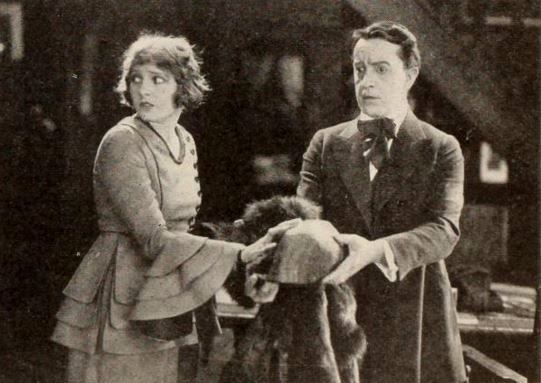
Denton Vane with Corinne Griffith in Love Watches (1918)

- On Her Wedding Night (1915)
- Who Killed Joe Merrion? (1915)
- The Man Who Couldn't Beat God (1915)
- The Island of Surprise (1916)
- Green Stockings (1916)
- An Enemy to the King (1916)
- The Glory of Yolanda (1917)
- The Maelstrom (1917)
- Birds of a Feather (1917)
- The Grell Mystery (1917)
- The Stolen Treaty (1917)
- Love Watches (1918)
- The Golden Goal (1918)
- The Beloved Impostor (1918)
- Miss Ambition (1918)
- A Girl at Bay (1919)
- The Man Who Won (1919)
- The Bramble Bush (1919)
- Wings of Pride (1920)
- Women Men Love (1921)
- Flesh and Spirit (1922)

== Bibliography ==
- Goble, Alan. The Complete Index to Literary Sources in Film. Walter de Gruyter, 1999.
