= Tangled Lives (1918 film) =

1918 film by Paul Scardon

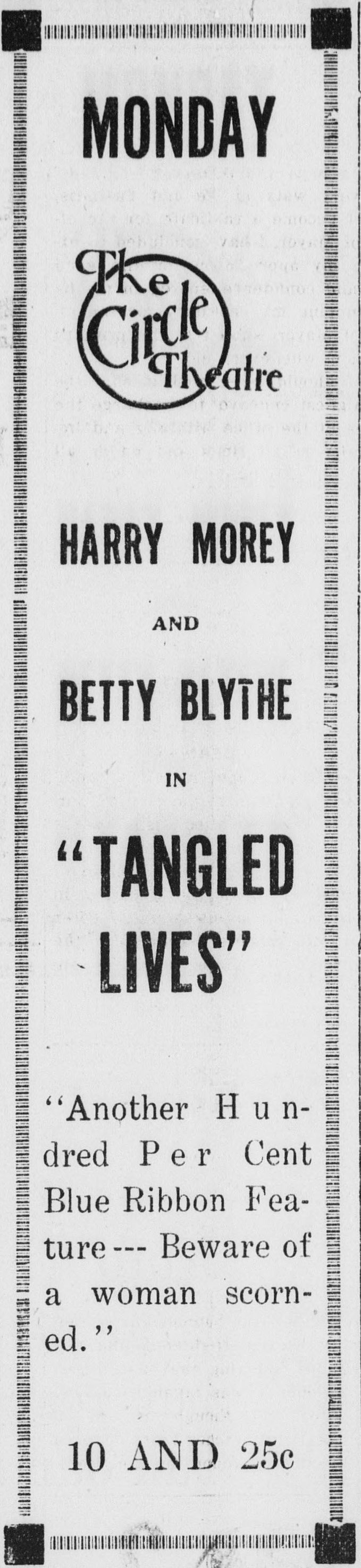
- Contemporary newspaper advertisement
- Directed by: Paul Scardon
- Written by: James Oliver Curwood (story); Garfield Thompson
- Produced by: Albert E. Smith
- Starring: Harry T. Morey; Betty Blythe; Jean Paige
- Production company: Vitagraph Company of America
- Distributed by: V-L-S-E
- Release date: July 1, 1918
- Running time: 50 minutes
- Country: United States
- Languages: Silent; English intertitles

Tangled Lives is a 1918 American silent drama film directed by Paul Scardon. It stars Harry T. Morey, Betty Blythe and Jean Paige.

== Cast ==
- Harry T. Morey as John Howland
- Betty Blythe as Hilda Howland
- Jean Paige as Lola Maynard
- Albert Roccardi as Peter Hyde
- George Majeroni as Paul West
- Eulalie Jensen as Cora West
- Charles Kent as Col. West

== Bibliography ==
- Robert B. Connelly. The Silents: Silent Feature Films, 1910-36, Volume 40, Issue 2. December Press, 1998.
