= The Adventure Shop =

1919 film directed by Kenneth Webb

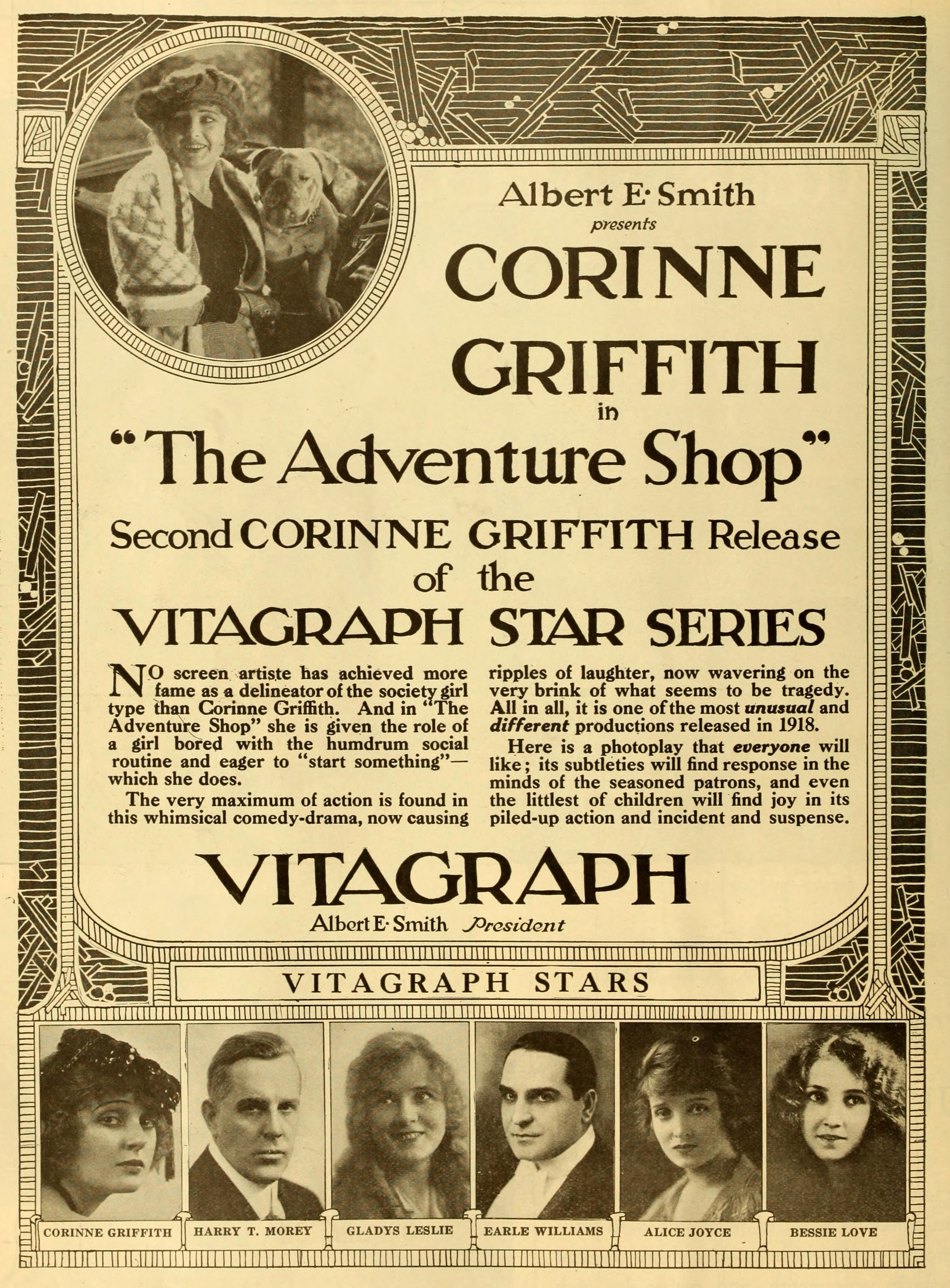
- Directed by: Kenneth S. Webb
- Written by: Harry Conway; Bud Fisher (story); George H. Plympton
- Starring: Corinne Griffith; Walter McGrail; Robert Gaillard
- Cinematography: Tom Malloy
- Production company: Vitagraph Studios
- Distributed by: Vitagraph Studios
- Release date: January 6, 1919
- Running time: 50 minutes
- Country: United States
- Languages: Silent; English intertitles

The Adventure Shop is a lost 1919 American silent adventure film directed by Kenneth S. Webb and starring Corinne Griffith, Walter McGrail and Robert Gaillard.

== Cast ==
- Corinne Griffith as Phyllis Blake
- Walter McGrail as Josephus Potts, Jr
- Warren Chandler as Josephus Potts
- Priestly Morrison as John Montgomery
- Robert Gaillard as Franklin Herbert

== Preservation ==
With no holdings located in archives, The Adventure Shop is considered a lost film.

== Bibliography ==
- Koszarski, Richard. Hollywood on the Hudson: Film and Television in New York from Griffith to Sarnoff. Rutgers University Press, 2008.
