= The Courage of Silence =

- Directed by: William P.S. Earle
- Based on: Who Shall Cast the Stone? by Milton Nobles
- Starring: Alice Joyce; Harry T. Morey; Willie Johnson
- Cinematography: Clark R. Nickerson
- Production company: Vitagraph Company of America
- Distributed by: V-L-S-E
- Release date: February 12, 1917
- Running time: 50 minutes
- Country: United States
- Languages: Silent; English intertitles

The Courage of Silence is a 1917 American silent drama film directed by William P.S. Earle and starring Alice Joyce, Harry T. Morey, and Willie Johnson.

== Cast ==
- Alice Joyce as Mercedes
- Harry T. Morey as Bradley
- Willie Johnson as Bobby
- Mildred May as Baby
- Clio Ayres as Alice
- Robert Gaillard as Hammond
- Walter McGrail as Saunders
- Anders Randolf as Spanish Ambassador
- Dorothy Conroy as French Girl

== Bibliography ==
- Donald W. McCaffrey & Christopher P. Jacobs. Guide to the Silent Years of American Cinema. Greenwood Publishing, 1999. ISBN 0-313-30345-2
