= The Crimson Runner =

1925 film by Tom Forman

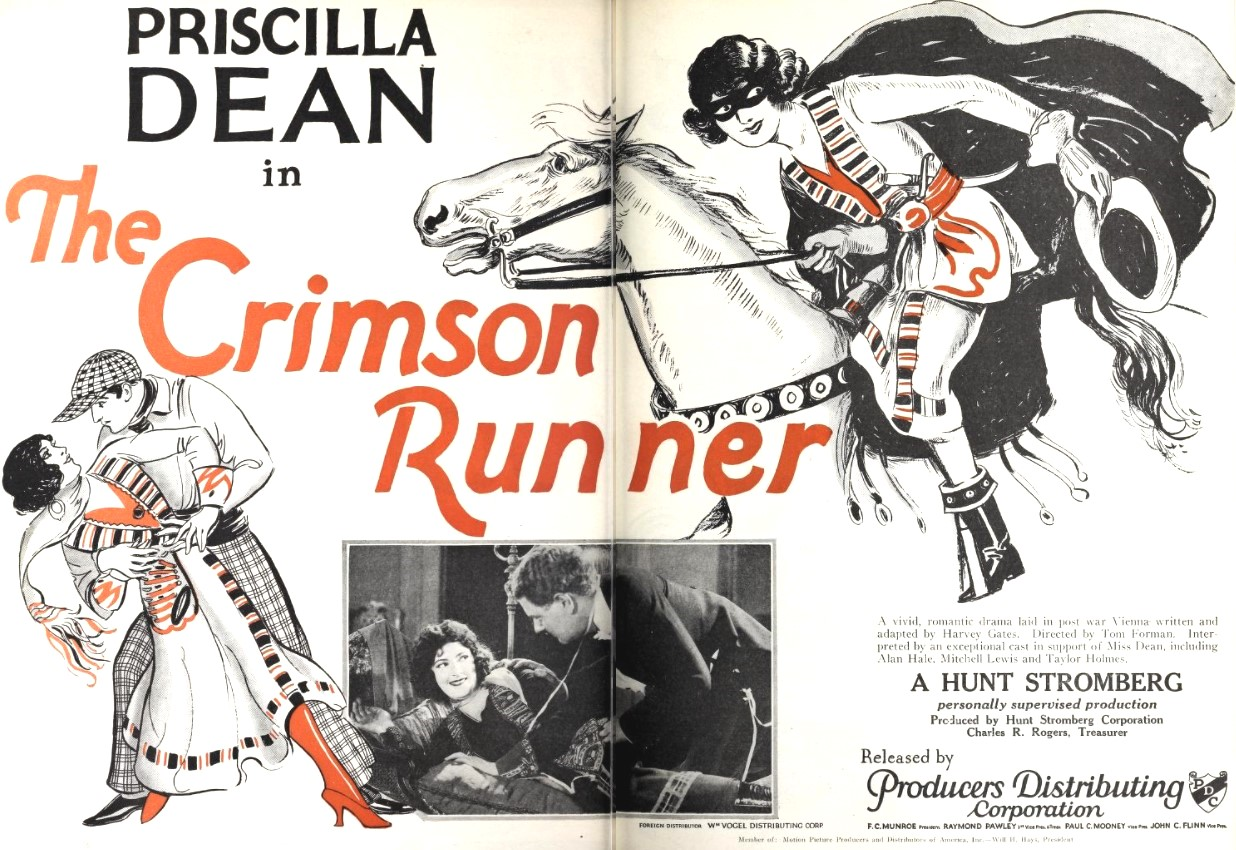
- Advertisement
- Directed by: Tom Forman
- Written by: Harvey Gates
- Produced by: Charles R. Rogers; Hunt Stromberg
- Starring: Priscilla Dean; Bernard Siegel; Alan Hale
- Cinematography: Sol Polito
- Edited by: William Decker
- Production company: Hunt Stromberg Productions
- Distributed by: Producers Distributing Corporation
- Release date: March 2, 1925
- Running time: 60 minutes
- Country: United States
- Language: Silent (English intertitles)

The Crimson Runner is a 1925 American silent drama film directed by Tom Forman and starring Priscilla Dean, Bernard Siegel, and Alan Hale.

== Plot ==
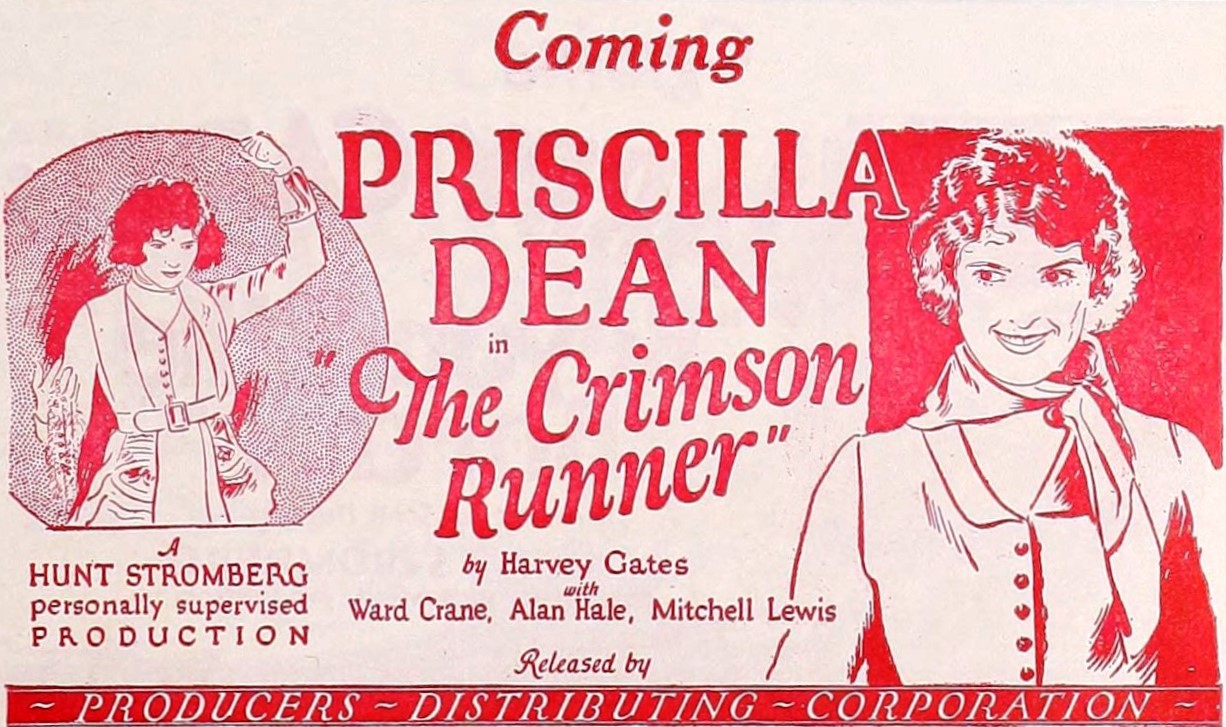
1925 ad

As described in a film magazine review, Bianca Schreber is a poor girl whose father was wounded while in the Austrian Army during World War I. She is obliged to steal to keep from starving. With many poor people in want in her town, she is brought to the decision to become an outlaw for the purpose of feeding the hungry. Police pursue her until she takes refuge in the home of a noble with whom she is in love. Gregory, who has faked a title and grafted to obtain his government position, discovers Bianca in his home but she escapes. When Gregory holds a masquerade ball, she hides behind a mask and wins his ardor. Infatuated with her, he takes her to his chamber and attacks her. The guests break down the door to find them struggling. Gregory leaps to his death from a window. The noble replaces Gregory in his position and obtains a pardon for the young woman, whom he marries.

== Cast ==
- Priscilla Dean as Bianca Schreber
- Bernard Siegel as Alfred Schreber
- Alan Hale as Gregory
- Ward Crane as Count Meinhard von Bauer
- James Neill as Baron Rudolph
- Charles Hill Mailes as Baron Semlin
- Ilsa De Lindt as Princess Cecile
- Mitchell Lewis as Conrad
- Taylor Holmes as Bobo
- Arthur Millett as Police Captain

== Preservation ==
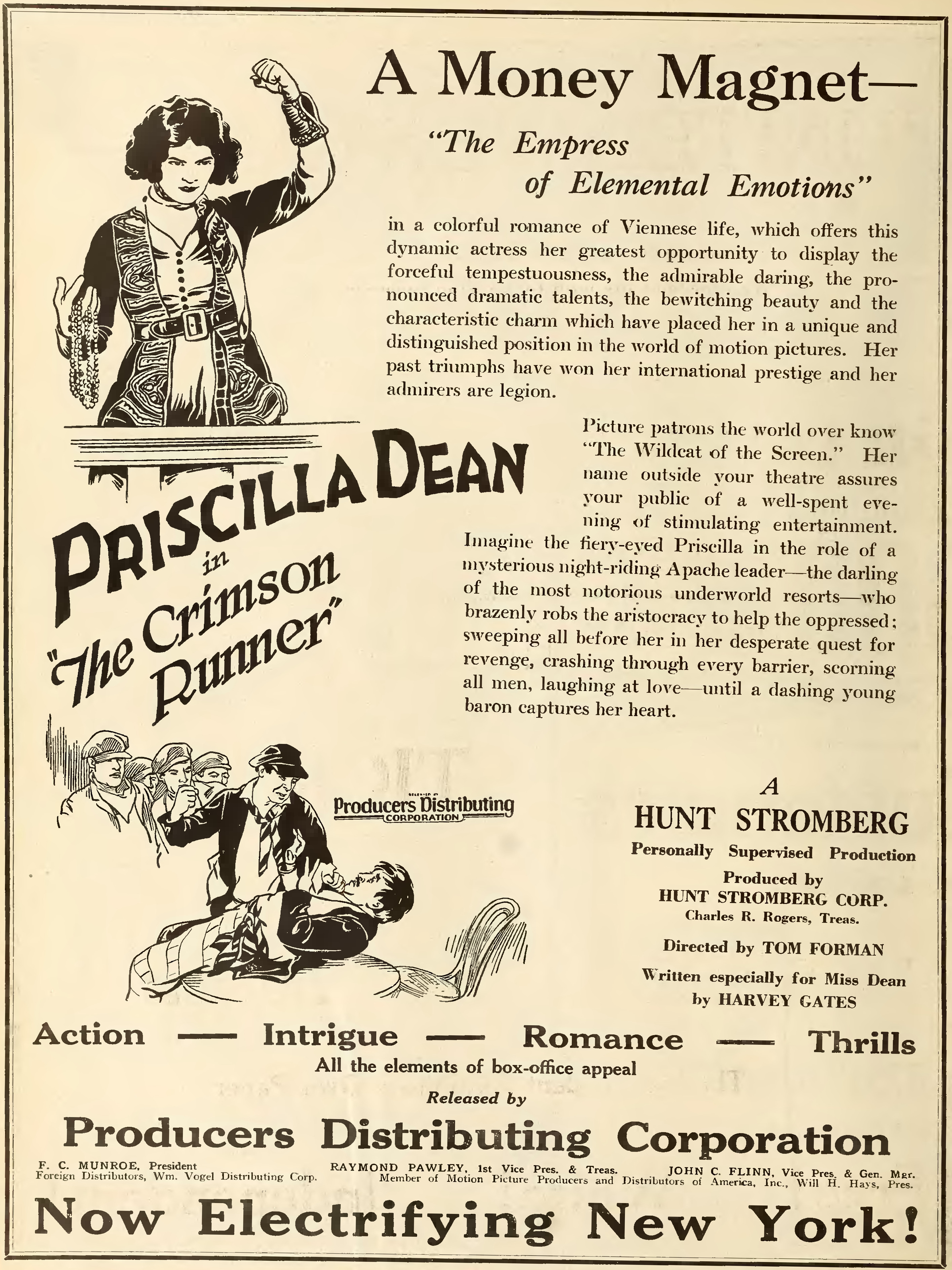
Ad from the Exhibitor's Trade Review, 1925

A complete copy of The Crimson Runner is located in the collection of Lobster Films in Paris.

== Bibliography ==
- Wlaschin, Ken (2009). Silent Mystery and Detective Movies: A Comprehensive Filmography. McFarland. ISBN 978-0-7864-4350-5
