= Paul Scardon =

Australian actor

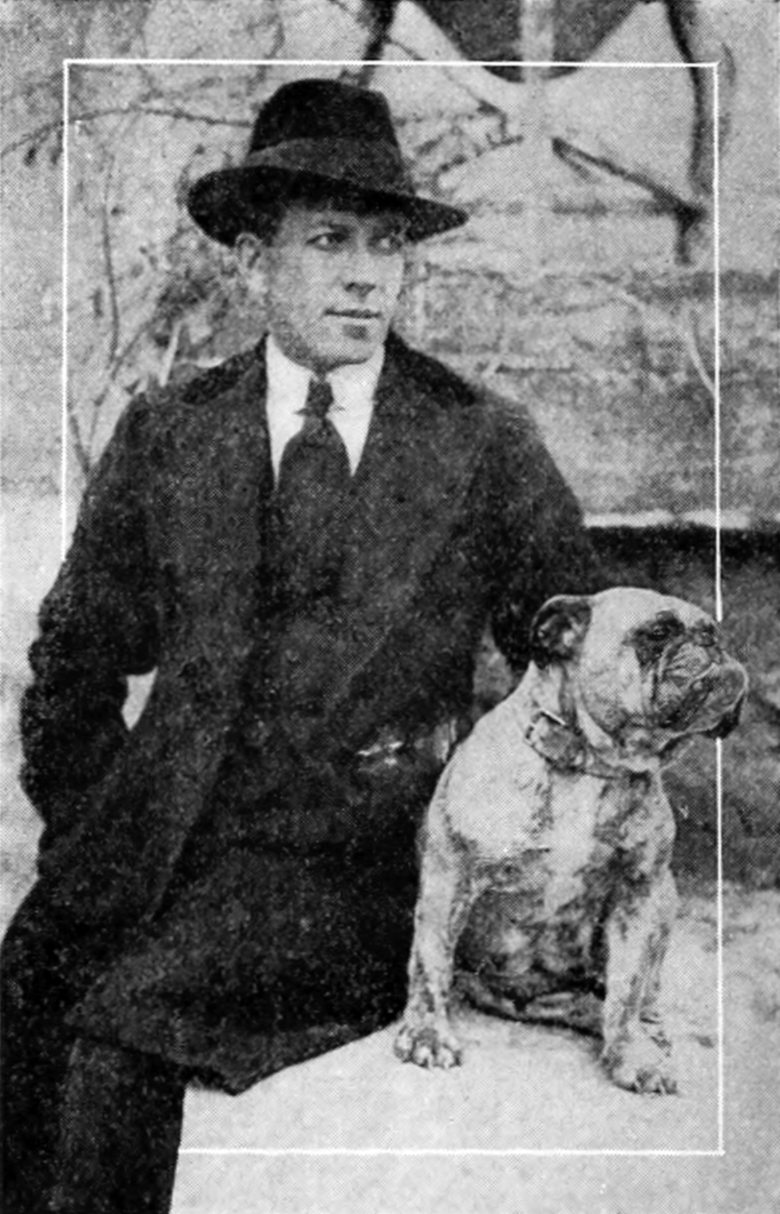
- Scardon, 1917
- Born: 6 May 1874; Melbourne, Victoria, Australia
- Died: 17 January 1954 (aged 79); Fontana, California, U.S.
- Occupations: Actor, director
- Spouse: Betty Blythe (m. 1919)

Paul Scardon (6 May 1874 – 17 January 1954) was an actor, a producer, and a director on both Australian and New York stages.

When he was 15, Scardon debuted on stage as a contortionist in vaudeville. He progressed from that to pantomime and then joined a troupe headed by J. C. Williamson, touring New Zealand and Australia for five years. In 1905, he joined a company headed by Nance O'Neil, and that group's tour brought him to the United States.

Scardon's Broadway credits include Mrs. Bumpstead-Leigh (1911), Becky Sharp (1911), The Green Cockatoo (1910), Hannele (1910), The Debtors (1909), Agnes(1908), Our American Cousin (1908), and Brigadier Gerard (1906).

Scardon went to Hollywood in 1910. In motion pictures, he worked for Majestic Pictures, Reliance-Majestic Studios and Vitagraph Studios. He directed Blanche Sweet in Unwilling Husband, Bessie Barriscale in some of her most successful productions, and most of the melodramas which starred his wife, actress Betty Blythe. Retiring when sound films came in, Scardon returned to films as an actor in the 1940s, playing bit roles until he retired from the film industry in 1948.

== Personal life and death ==
At the time of his death, Scardon was married to actress Betty Blythe. On January 18, 1954, Scardon died of a heart attack in Fontana, California, at age 79.

== Filmography ==
=== Actor ===
- A Simple Life (1912, Short) – Cy Smith – Marie's Father
- Uncle Tom's Cabin (1914) – Haley
- The Sins of the Mothers (1914) – Anatole De Voie
- The Juggernaut (1915) – Alexander Jones
- The Goddess (1915) – Prof. Stilliter
- The Battle Cry of Peace (1915) – Gen. Ulysses S. Grant
- The Alibi (1916) – Walter Slayton
- Man from Montreal (1939) – Trapper (uncredited)
- Fighting Mad (1939)
- The Green Hornet (1940, Serial) – Timothy Bryan [Ch. 7] (uncredited)
- The Fatal Hour (1940) – Homer Lyons – Informant (uncredited)
- Waterloo Bridge (1940) – Backdoor Stage Doorman (uncredited)
- The Fargo Kid (1940) – Caleb Winters
- Lady From Louisiana (1941) – Judge Wilson
- The Son of Davy Crockett (1941) – Zeke
- Today I Hang (1942) – Peter Hobbs
- The Man Who Returned to Life (1942) – Reverend Tuller (uncredited)
- My Favorite Blonde (1942) – Dr. Robert Higby (uncredited)
- Mrs. Miniver (1942) – Nobby (uncredited)
- Ten Gentlemen from West Point (1942) – Senator (uncredited)
- Tish (1942) – Toronto Postal Clerk (uncredited)
- A Yank at Eton (1942) – Old Cleaner (uncredited)
- The Man from the Rio Grande (1943) – Hanlon – County Clerk
- His Butler's Sister (1943) – Professor (uncredited)
- The Adventures of Mark Twain (1944) – Rudyard Kipling (uncredited)
- Kitty (1945) – Undertaker (uncredited)
- The Daltons Ride Again (1945) – Attorney (uncredited)
- Cinderella Jones (1946) – Judge Rutledge (uncredited)
- Down Missouri Way (1946) – Prof. Lewis
- Gentleman Joe Palooka (1946) – File Room Attendant (uncredited)
- The Verdict (1946) – Sexton (uncredited)
- Pursued (1947) – Juryman (uncredited)
- Time Out of Mind (1947) – Butler (uncredited)
- Joe Palooka in the Knockout (1947) – Railroad Clerk (uncredited)
- Magic Town (1947) – Hodges
- Merton of the Movies (1947) – Club Member (uncredited)
- The Fabulous Texan (1947) – Citizen (uncredited)
- Secret Beyond the Door (1947) – Owl Eyes (uncredited)
- Joe Palooka in Fighting Mad (1948) – Dr. Burman
- The Sign of the Ram (1948) – Perowen (uncredited)
- Canon City (1948) – Joe Bondy
- He Walked by Night (1948) – Liquor Store Proprietor (uncredited)
- The Shanghai Chest (1948)
- A Connecticut Yankee in King Arthur's Court (1949) – White Haired Peddler (uncredited)
- The Doolins of Oklahoma (1949) – Minor Role (uncredited)
- Samson and Delilah (1949) – Beggar (uncredited)
- Belle of Old Mexico (1950) – Mr. Ambercrombie (uncredited) (final film role)

=== Director ===
- The Alibi
- All Man
- Apartment 29
- Arsene Lupin (1917)
- A Bachelor's Children
- Beating the Odds
- Beauty-Proof
- The Breaking Point (1921)
- The Broken Gate
- Children Not Wanted
- The Darkest Hour
- The Dawn of Freedom
- The Desired Woman
- The Enemy
- False Kisses (1921)
- Fighting Destiny
- The Gamblers
- A Game with Fate
- The Golden Gallows
- The Golden Goal (1918)
- The Green God (1918)
- The Grell Mystery (1917)
- The Hawk
- Her Own Free Will (1924)
- Her Right to Live
- Her Unwilling Husband (1920)
- The Hero of Submarine D-2
- Hoarded Assets (1918)
- In Honor's Web (1919)
- In the Balance
- The Island of Surprise
- The King of Diamonds
- The Love Doctor
- The Maelstrom
- The Man Who Won (1919)
- Milestones (1920)
- The Other Man
- Partners of the Night (1920)
- Phantom Fortunes
- A Prince in a Pawnshop
- The Redemption of Dave Darcey
- Rose of the South
- Shattered Dreams (1922)
- Silent Strength (1919)
- Soldiers of Chance
- The Stolen Treaty (1917)
- Tangled Lives (1918)
- Transgression
- When the Devil Drives (1922)
- A Wonderful Wife
