= The Golden Goal =

1918 film directed by Paul Scardon

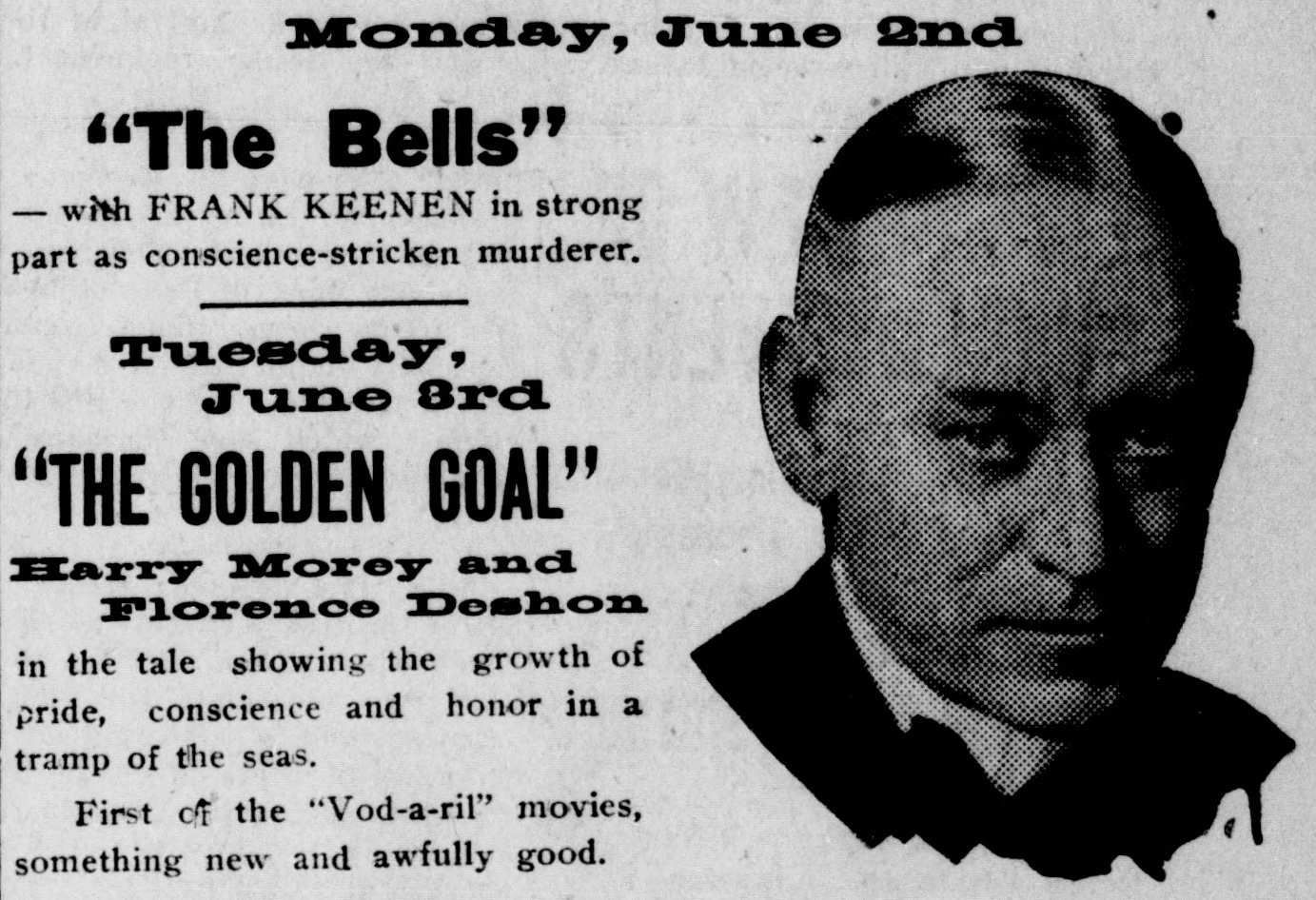
- Newspaper advertisement
- Directed by: Paul Scardon
- Written by: Garfield Thompson; Lawrence McCloskey
- Produced by: Albert E. Smith
- Starring: Harry T. Morey; Florence Deshon; Jean Paige
- Cinematography: Robert A. Stuart
- Production company: Vitagraph
- Distributed by: Greater Vitagraph, Inc.
- Release date: May 29, 1918 (US)
- Running time: 5 reels
- Country: United States
- Language: English

The Golden Goal is a 1918 American silent drama film directed by Paul Scardon, written by Garfield Thompson and Lawrence McCloskey. The film stars Harry T. Morey, Florence Deshon, and Jean Paige.

== Cast list ==
- Harry T. Morey as John Doran
- Florence Deshon as Beatrice Walton
- Jean Paige as Laura Brooks
- Arthur Donaldson as Mr. Walton
- Denton Vane as Richard Talbot
- Robert Gaillard
- Bernard Siegel
