= Bernard Siegel (actor) =

American actor

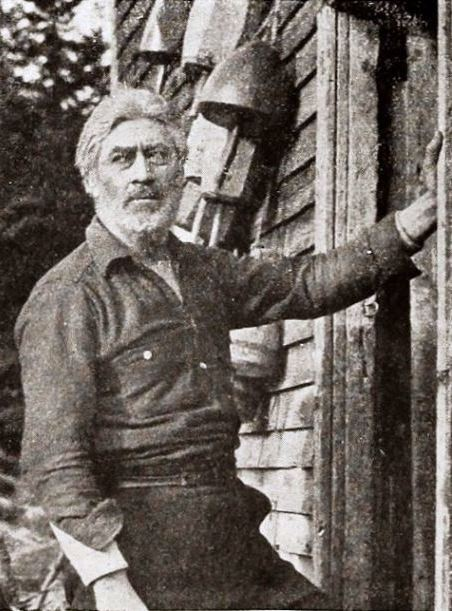
- Siegel in The Love Nest (1922)
- Born: April 19, 1868; Lemberg, Galicia, Austria-Hungary
- Died: July 9, 1940 (aged 72); Los Angeles, California, United States
- Occupation: Actor
- Years active: 1913–1939

Bernard Siegel (April 19, 1868 – July 9, 1940) was an Austro-Hungarian born American character actor, whose career spanned both the silent film era, as well as carrying over into the beginning of sound pictures. His career spanned over 25 years, during which time he performed in over 50 films.

== Life and career ==
Siegel was born in the city of Lemberg (today known as Lviv, Ukraine), in the province of Galicia in the Austria-Hungarian Empire on April 19, 1868. His film career began with a small featured role in the 1913 silent film, The Third Degree (which would be remade in 1919, and again in 1926, the latter film being the first film directed by Michael Curtiz). Over the next 26 years he would appear in almost 70 films, most of those films taking place during the silent era. He would only act in thirteen sound films.

In 1940 Siegel, age 72, died of a heart attack in Los Angeles.

=== Selected filmography ===
(Filmography based on the AFI database, with supplemental information from Media Bang)

Year	Title	Role	Notes
1913	The Third Degree	Dr. Bernstein	
1914	The Daughters of Men	Oscar Lackett	
1914	The Wolf	Baptiste Le Grand	
1914	Threads of Destiny	Isaac Gruenstein	
1914	The Fortune Hunter	Mr. Lee	
1915	The Valley of Lost Hope	Undetermined role	
1915	The Rights of Man: a Story of War's Red Blotch	Karl	
1915	The Great Ruby	Hans, a porter	
1916	Souls in Bondage	Mr. Brenner	
1917	The Maelstrom	Dago Sam	
1917	The Glory of Yolanda	Paul	
1917	Womanhood, the Glory of the Nation	Carl, the spy	
1917	The Message of the Mouse	Valet	
1917	Arsene Lupin	Charolais	
1917	The Grell Mystery	Ivan	
1917	The Stolen Treaty	Riddle	
1917	Within the Law	Tom Dacey	
1918	The Triumph of the Weak	Brown	
1918	Hoarded Assets		
1918	The Green God	Li Min	
1918	Everybody's Girl	Millinery shop proprietor	
1918	The Song of the Soul	Oelsen	
1918	The Woman Between Friends		
1918	All Man	Ryan	
1918	The Golden Goal		
1919	In Honor's Web	Norman Cobb	
1919	The Man Who Won	Seymour	
1919	The Cambric Mask	David Creed	
1919	Silent Strength	Tom Tripp	
1920	The Flaming Clue	Rabeet	
1920	Dead Men Tell No Tales	Braithwaite	
1920	The Birth of a Soul	Sheriff	
1921	The Heart of Maryland	Provost-Sergeant Blount	
1922	A Stage Romance	Mr. Sleeker	
1922	The Man Who Paid	Anton Barbier	
1922	The Madness of Love	Sim Calloway	
1922	The Love Nest	Sim Corwin	
1923	None So Blind	Saul Cohen	
1923	Sidewalks of New York		
1923	Where Is This West?	Indian servant	
1924	The Next Corner	The stranger	
1924	Emblems of Love		
1924	The 40th Door	Tew Fick Pasha	
1924	Against All Odds	Lewis	
1924	Romance Ranch	Felipe Varillo	
1925	The Spaniard	Manuel	
1925	Wild Horse Mesa	Toddy Nokin	
1925	The Phantom of the Opera	Joseph Buquet	
1925	The Crimson Runner	Alfred Schreber	
1925	The Vanishing American	Do Etin	
1926	Going Crooked		
1928	Laugh, Clown, Laugh	Simon	
1928	Stand and Deliver	Blind Operator	
1928	The Divine Sinner	Johan Ludwig	
1929	Sea Fury	Carpenter	
