= The Beloved Impostor =

1918 film by Joseph Gleason

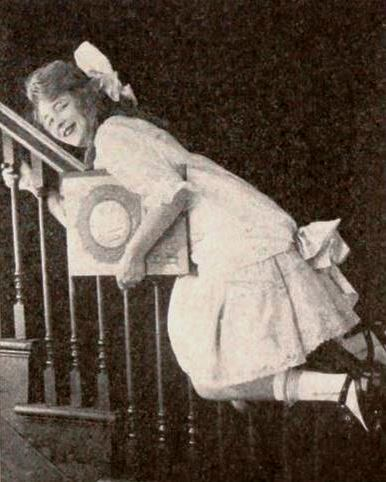
- Still of Gladys Leslie disguised as a twelve year old
- Directed by: Joseph Gleason
- Written by: A. Van Buren Powell (scenario)
- Story by: Elizabeth J. Mariani
- Starring: Gladys Leslie; Huntley Gordon; Denton Vane
- Production companies: Vitagraph Company of America; A Blue Ribbon Feature
- Distributed by: Greater Vitagraph
- Release date: December 16, 1918
- Running time: 5 reels
- Country: United States
- Languages: Silent film (English intertitles)

The Beloved Impostor is a 1918 American silent drama film directed by Joseph Gleason and starring Gladys Leslie, Huntley Gordon, and Denton Vane. The film was released by Greater Vitagraph on December 16, 1918.

The film marks the debut of Neil Hamilton.

== Cast ==
- Gladys Leslie as Betty
- Huntley Gordon as Dick Mentor
- Denton Vane as Hugh
- Mrs. Hurley as Aunt Jessie
- Frances Miller Grant as Mammy
- Gwen Williams as Gertrude
- Miriam Miles
- Neil Hamilton

== Preservation ==
It is unknown whether the film survives as none of copies were able to locate, likely presumed lost.
