= The Man Who Won (1919 film) =

1919 film directed by Paul Scardon

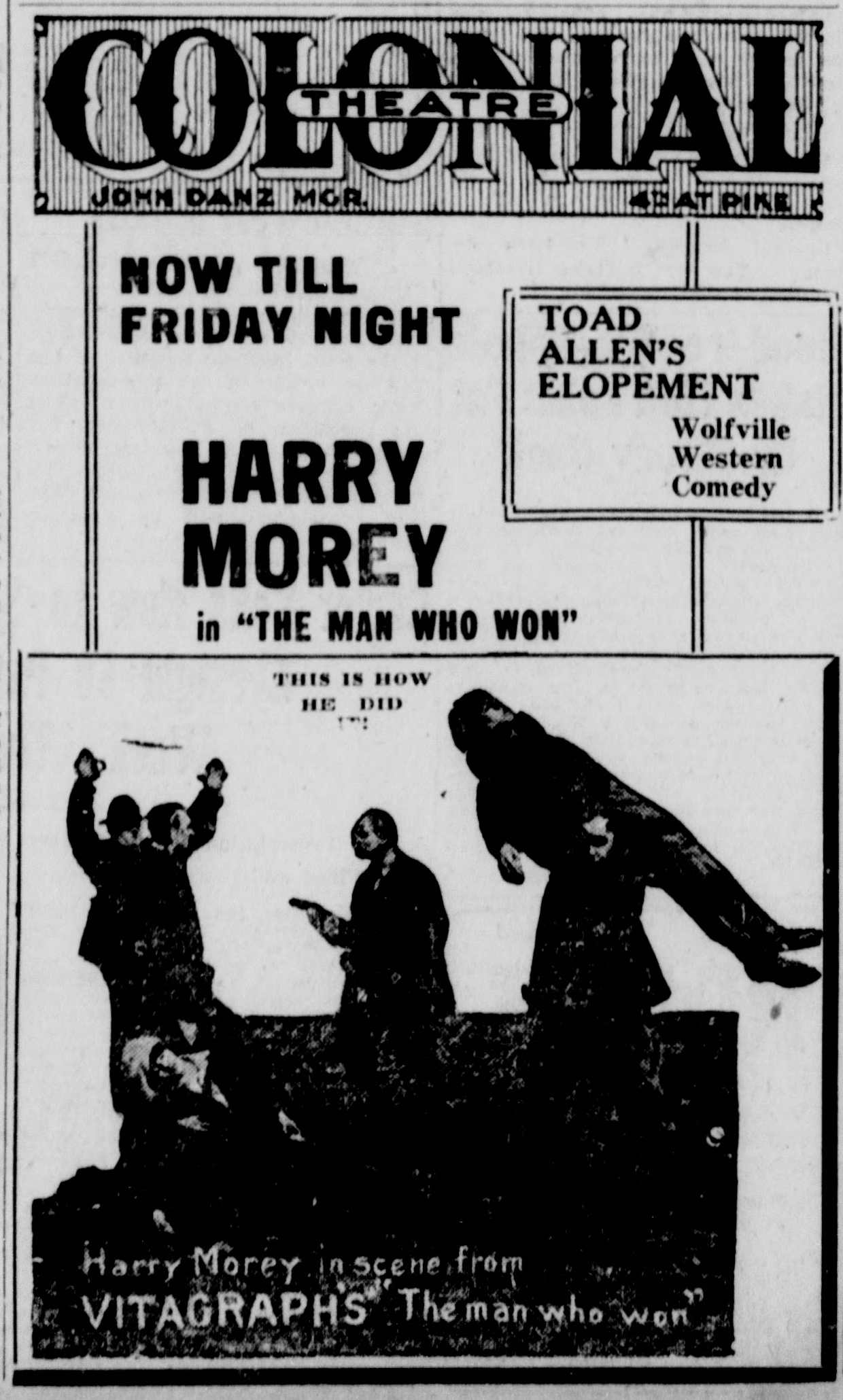
- Newspaper advertisement
- Directed by: Paul Scardon
- Written by: Edward J. Montagne
- Based on: the novel, The Man Who Won by Cyrus Townsend Brady
- Starring: Harry T. Morey; Maurice Costello; Betty Blythe
- Cinematography: Robert A. Stuart
- Production company: Vitagraph
- Release date: July 11, 1919 (US)
- Running time: 5 reels
- Country: United States
- Language: English

The Man Who Won is a 1919 American silent drama film directed by Paul Scardon and written by Edward J. Montagne. The film stars Harry T. Morey, Maurice Costello, and Betty Blythe.

== Cast list ==
- Harry T. Morey as Christopher Keene
- Maurice Costello as Henry Longfield
- Betty Blythe as Barbara Le Moyne
- Bernard Siegel as Seymour
- Robert Gaillard as Dempsey
- Denton Vane as Stevens
