= Betty Blythe =

American actress (1893–1972)

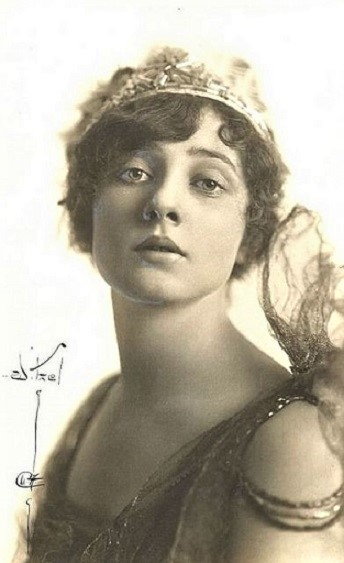
- Blythe, c. 1920
- Born: Elizabeth Blythe Slaughter; September 1, 1893; Los Angeles, California, U.S.
- Died: April 7, 1972 (aged 78); Los Angeles, California, U.S.
- Occupation: Actress
- Years active: 1916–1964
- Spouse: Paul Scardon (m. 1919; died 1954)

Betty Blythe (born Elizabeth Blythe Slaughter; September 1, 1893 – April 7, 1972) was an American actress best known for her dramatic roles in exotic silent films such as The Queen of Sheba (1921). She appeared in 63 silent films and 56 sound films over the course of her career.

== Early life and education ==
She was born Elizabeth Blythe Slaughter in Los Angeles, where she attended Westlake School for Girls and the University of Southern California. Betty had shortened her name to Betty Blythe when she and three other women posed for a photo shoot of the newest swim fashion for women, a bathing suit. Previously, women were expected to wear stockings with full dresses or skirts into the water.

== Career ==
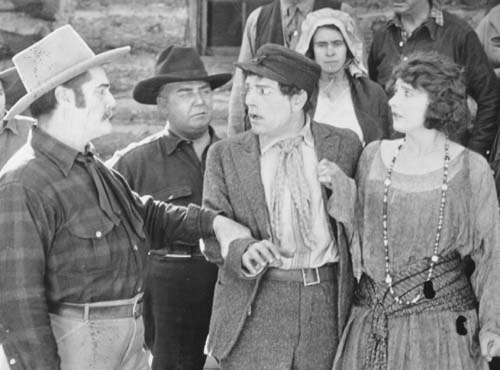
Still (left to right) of Melbourne MacDowell, Lon Chaney and Blythe in Nomads of the North, 1920

Blythe began her stage work in such theatrical pieces as So Long Letty and The Peacock Princess. She worked in vaudeville as the "California Nightingale" singing songs such as "Love Tales from Hoffman".

In 1915, she had an unbilled part in Bella Donna for Famous Players Film Company. After her first Vitagraph Studios role in the 1917 vehicle, she was given a leading role in the studio's 1918 film A Game with Fate.

As famous for her revealing costumes as for her dramatic skills, she became a star in such exotic films as The Queen of Sheba (1921) (in which she at times wore little above the waist except a string of beads), Chu-Chin-Chow (made in 1923; released by MGM in the US 1925) and She (1925). She was seen to good advantage in films like Nomads of the North (1920) with Lon Chaney and In Hollywood with Potash and Perlmutter (1924), produced by Samuel Goldwyn. Other roles were as an opera star, unbilled, in Garbo's The Mysterious Lady. She continued to work as a character actress. One of her later roles was a small, uncredited role in a crowd scene in 1964's My Fair Lady.

== Personal life ==
Blythe was married to the movie director Paul Scardon from 1919 until his death in 1954. She reportedly made $3.5 million when she sold a section of land that is now part of the Sunset Strip. She lost her fortune in the 1929 stock market crash.

She died of a heart attack in the Woodland Hills neighborhood of Los Angeles in 1972, aged 78. She is buried at Forest Lawn Memorial Park in Glendale, California.

== Legacy ==
For her contributions to the film industry, Betty Blythe has a motion pictures star on the Hollywood Walk of Fame located at 1708 Vine Street.

Her name lives on through the Betty Blythe Vintage Tearoom in West Kensington, London, England.

== Gallery ==
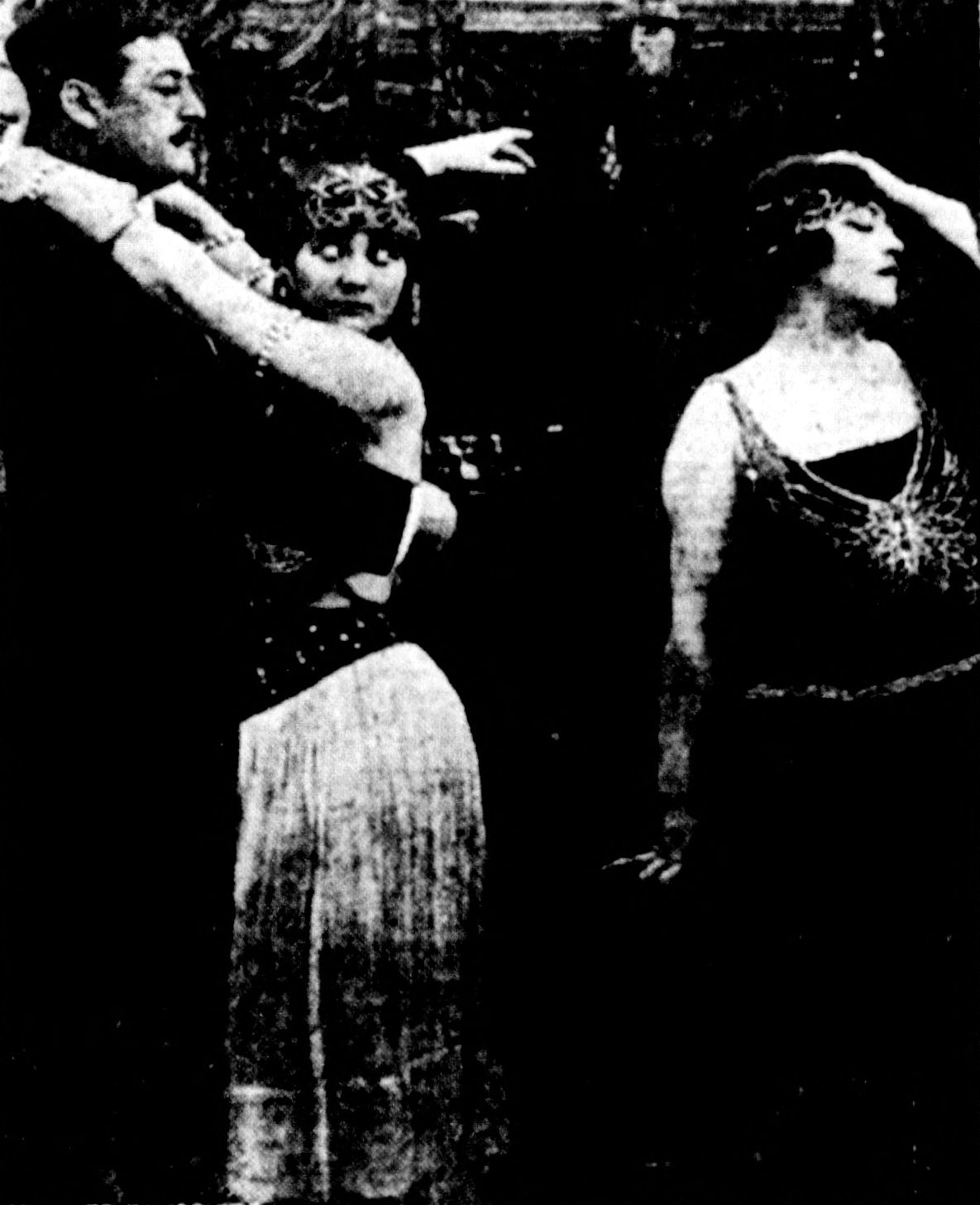
Bella Donna, L-R, L'Estrange, Blythe, Frederick

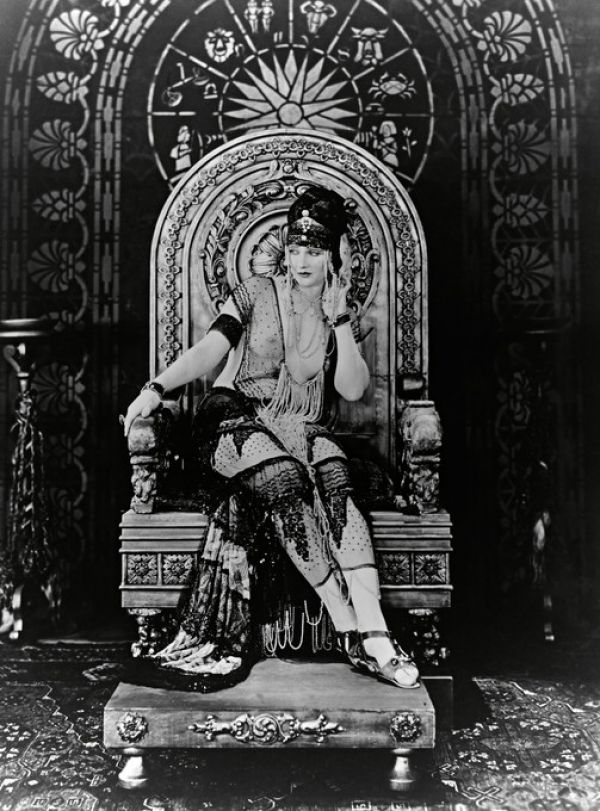
Queen of Sheba

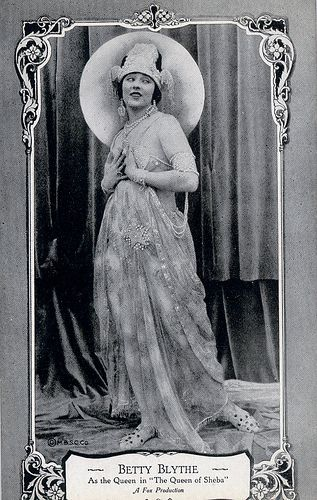
Queen of Sheba poster

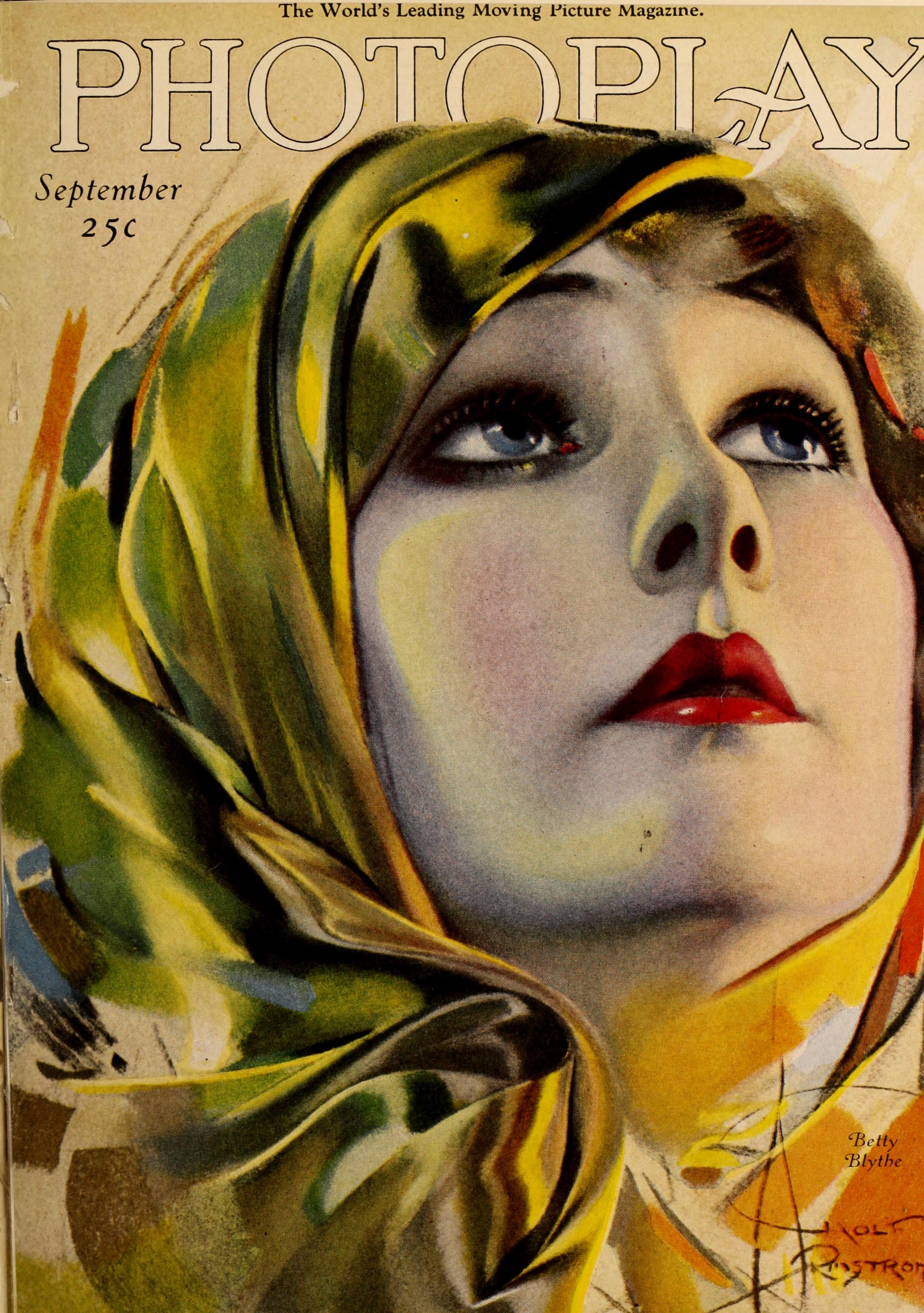
Photoplay cover

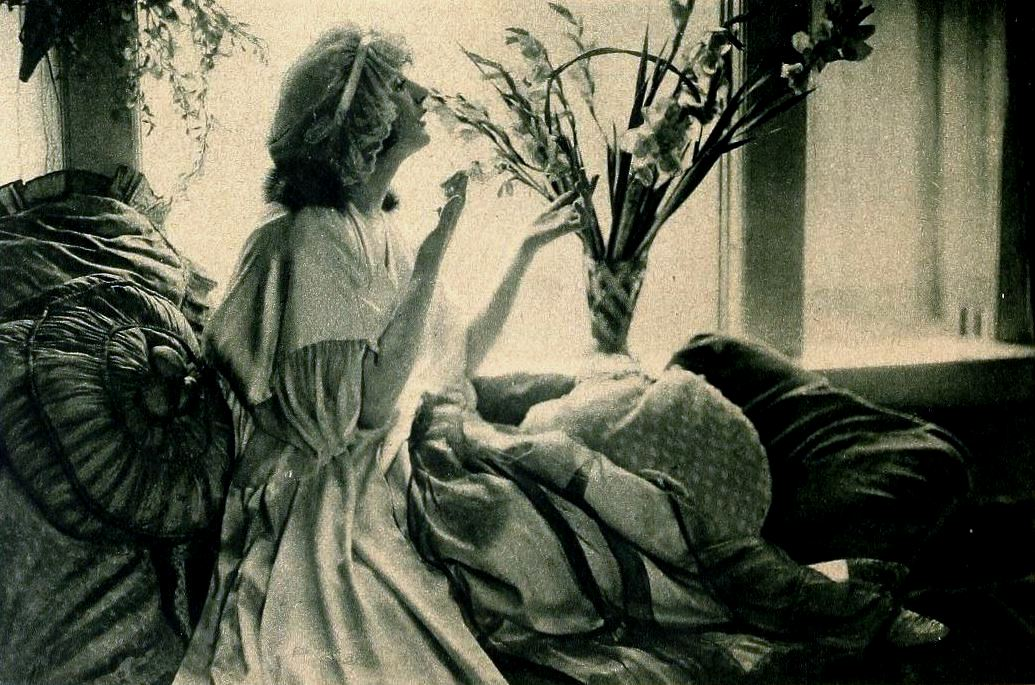
Shadowland

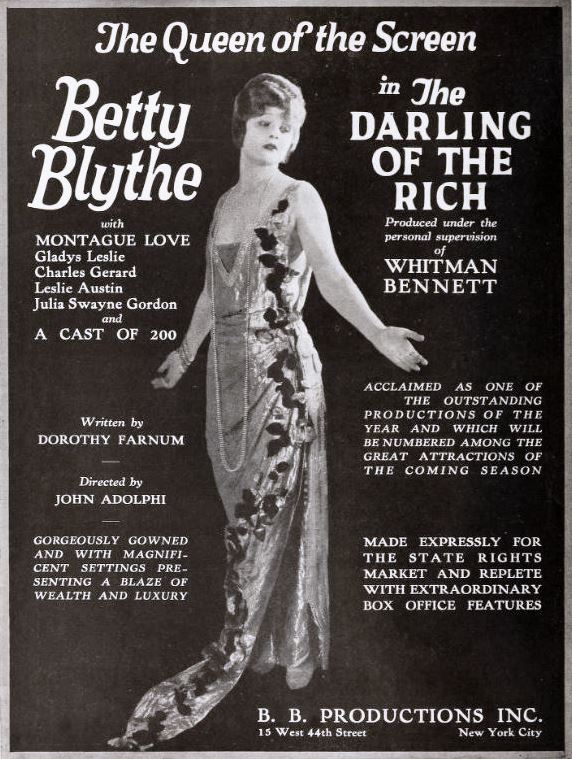
Darling of the Rich advertisement

== Filmography ==
Film credits of Betty Blythe
Year	Title	Role	Studio/notes	Ref(s)
1915	Bella Donna	Dancer (uncredited)	Famous Players Film Company	
1917	His Own People	Lady Mary Thorne	Vitagraph Studios	
1918	A Game With Fate	Elaine Huntington	Vitagraph	
1918	A Mother's Sin	Lady Fitzpatrick	Vitagraph	
1918	Over the Top	Madame Arnot	Vitagraph	
1918	The Little Runaway	Eileen Murtagh	Vitagraph	
1918	The Green God	Muriel Temple	Vitagraph	
1918	The King of Diamonds	Lucille Bennett	Vitagraph	
1918	Tangled Lives	Hilda Howland	Vitagraph	
1918	The Business of Life	Elena Clydesdale	Vitagraph	
1918	All Man	Belle Foliot	Vitagraph	
1918	Hoarded Assets	Claire Dawson	Vitagraph	
1918	Miss Ambition	Edith Webster	Vitagraph	
1919	The Undercurrent	Mariska	Select Pictures	
1919	Silent Strength	Ruth Madison	Vitagraph	
1919	Beauty-Proof	Carol Thorpe	Vitagraph	
1919	Beating the Odds	Hebe Norse	Vitagraph	
1919	Fighting Destiny	Caryl Rundlege	Vitagraph	
1919	The Man Who Won	Barbara Le Moyne	Vitagraph	
1919	Dust of Desire	Corrinne Torrence	Vitagraph	
1920	Occasionally Yours	Bunny Winston	L. J. Gasnier Productions	
1920	The Third Generation	Helen Van Dusen	Brentwood Film Corporation	
1920	The Silver Horde	Mildred Wayland	Eminent Authors Pictures, Inc.	
1920	Burnt Wings	Helen	Universal Films	
1920	Nomads of the North	Nanette Roland	James Oliver Curwood Productions Inc.	
1921	The Truant Husband	Vera Delauney	Rockett Film Corp.	
1921	Just Outside the Door	Gloria Wheaton	Weber Productions	
1921	The Queen of Sheba	The Queen of Sheba	Fox Film	
1921	Mother o' Mine	Fan Baxter	Thomas H. Ince Productions	
1921	Charge It	Millie Garreth	Equity Pictures	
1922	The Darling of the Rich	Cast member	B.B. Productions	
1922	His Wife's Husband	Olympia Brewster	Pyramid Pictures	
1922	How Women Love	Rosa Roma	B.B. Productions	
1922	Fair Lady	Countess Margherita	Bennett Pictures Corp.	
1923	Chu-Chin-Chow	Zahrat	MGM	
1923	The Truth About Wives	Helen Frazer	B. B. Productions	
1923	Sinner or Saint	Mademoiselle Iris	B. B. Productions	
1923	The Darling of the Rich	Charmion Winship	B. B. Productions	
1924	Southern Love	Dolores	Graham-Wilcox Productions	
1924	The Breath of Scandal	Sybil Russell	B. P. Schulberg Productions	
1924	The Spitfire	Jean Bronson	Murray W. Garsson Productions	
1924	The Recoil	Norma Selbee	Goldwyn Pictures	
1924	The Folly of Vanity	Mrs. Ridgeway	Fox Film	
1924	In Hollywood with Potash and Perlmutter	Rita Sismondi	Goldwyn	
1925	Speed	Mary Whipple	Banner Productions	
1925	She	Ayesha	Reciprocity Films	
1925	Percy	Lolita	Thomas H. Ince Productions	
1926	Mother's Boy	Cast member		
1926	Le Puits de Jacob	Cast member		
1927	Snowbound	Julia Barry	Tiffany-Stahl Productions	
1927	Eager Lips	Paula	Chadwick Pictures	
1927	The Girl from Gay Paree	Mademoiselle Fanchon	Tiffany-Stahl Productions	
1927	A Million Bid	Mrs. Gordon	Warner Bros.	
1928	Domestic Troubles	Cast member		
1928	Sisters of Eve	Mrs. Wenham Gardner	Trem Carr	
1928	Glorious Betsy	Princess Fredericka	Warner Bros.	
1928	Into No Man's Land	The Countess	Excellent Pictures Corp.	
1928	The Mysterious Lady	[?]	MGM	
1931	Stars of Yesterday	Archive footage	Vitaphone	
1932	Tom Brown of Culver	Dolores Delight	Universal	
1932	Lena Rivers	Mrs. Mathilda Nichols	Tiffany Productions	
1932	Back Street	[?]	Universal	
1933	Before Midnight	Mavis Fry	Columbia	
1933	Pilgrimage	Janet Prescot	Fox Film	
1933	Only Yesterday	Mrs. Vincent	Universal	
1934	Two Heads on a Pillow	Mrs. Walker	Liberty Pictures	
1934	The Scarlet Letter	Innkeeper	Larry Darmour Productions	
1934	A Girl of the Limberlost	Mrs. Parker, "The Bird Woman"	Monogram Pictures	
1934	Money Means Nothing	Mrs. Ferris	Monogram Pictures	
1934	Night Alarm	Elizabeth Van Dusen	Larry Darmour Productions	
1934	Badge of Honor	Mrs. Van Alstyne	Mayfair Pictures	
1934	Ever Since Eve	Mrs. Vandegrift	Fox Film	
1934	I've Been Around	[?]	Universal Pictures	
1935	Anna Karenina	[?]	MGM	
1935	The Spanish Cape Mystery	Mrs. Godfrey	Liberty Pictures	
1935	Cheers of the Crowd	Lil Langdon Walton	Monogram Pictures	
1935	The Fighting Lady	Mrs. Hanford	Fanchon Royer Pictures	
1935	The Perfect Clue	Ursula Chesebrough	Larry Darmour Productions	
1935	Western Courage	Mrs. Hanley	Columbia Pictures; Larry Darmour Productions	
1936	It's Up to You	Martha	Raphael G. Wolff, Inc.	
1936	Murder at Glen Athol	Ann Randel	Invincible Pictures	
1936	Rainbow on the River	Flower buyer	Principal Productions, Inc.	
1936	Yours for the Asking	Society woman	Paramount	
1936	The Gorgeous Hussy	Mrs. Wainwright	MGM	
1937	Conquest	Princess Mirska (uncredited)	MGM	
1937	Espionage	Passenger	MGM	
1937	Topper	Mrs. Goodrich (uncredited)		
1938	Hold That Kiss	[?]	MGM	
1938	Gangster's Boy	Mrs. Davis	Monogram Pictures	
1938	Romance of the Limberlost	Mrs. Parker	Monogram Pictures	
1938	Delinquent Parents	Mrs. Wharton	Progressive Pictures	
1938	Man-Proof	Country club woman	MGM	
1938	Little Tough Guys in Society	[?]	Universal Studios	
1939	The Women	Mrs. South (uncredited)	MGM	
1940	Earl of Puddlestone	Millicent Potter-Potter	Republic Pictures	
1940	Misbehaving Husbands	Effie Butler	Producers Releasing Corporation	
1941	Our Wife	(unknown)	Columbia Pictures	
1941	Tuxedo Junction	Miss Hornblower	Republic Pictures	
1941	Honky Tonk	Mrs. Wilson	MGM	
1941	Federal Fugitives	Marcia	Producers Releasing Corporation	
1941	Top Sergeant Mulligan	Mrs. Lewis	Monogram Productions	
1941	The Miracle Kid	Madam Gloria	John T. Coyle Productions	
1942	Two Yanks in Trinidad	[?]	Columbia Pictures	
1942	Dawn on the Great Divide	Mrs. Elmira Corkle	Monogram Productions	
1942	Freckles Comes Home	Mrs. Potter	Monogram Productions	
1942	House of Errors	Mrs. Martha Randall	Producers Releasing Corporation	
1942	Yokel Boy	Reporter	Republic Pictures	
1943	Presenting Lily Mars	Dowager	MGM	
1943	Mr. Muggs Steps Out	Margaret Morgan	Monogram Pictures	
1943	Sarong Girl	Miss Ellsworth	Monogram Productions	
1943	Bar 20	Mrs. Stevens	Harry Sherman Productions	
1943	Spotlight Scandals	Mrs. Baker	Banner Productions	
1943	Girls in Chains	Mrs. Grey	Atlantis Picture Corporation	
1944	The Chinese Cat	Mrs. Manning	Monogram Pictures	
1944	Where Are Your Children?	Mrs. Cheston	Monogram Pictures	
1945	Her Highness and the Bellboy	Diplomat's Wife (uncredited)	MGM	
1945	Abbott and Costello in Hollywood	Mrs. Murdock	MGM	
1945	Docks of New York	Mrs. Darcy	Monogram Pictures	
1945	Love, Honor and Goodbye	Wife	Republic Pictures	
1945	They Were Expendable	Officer's Wife (uncredited)	MGM	
1945	Adventure	Mrs. Buckley (uncredited)	MGM	
1946	Undercurrent	Saleslady (uncredited)	MGM	
1946	The Undercover Woman	Cissy Van Horn	Republic Pictures	
1946	A Fig Leaf for Eve	Lavinia Sardham	Carey Westen Corp	
1946	Joe Palooka, Champ	Mrs. Stafford	Monogram Pictures	
1946	The Hoodlum Saint	[?]	MGM	
1946	The Kid from Brooklyn	Mrs. LeMoyne's friend (uncredited)	Samuel Goldwyn Productions	
1946	The Postman Always Rings Twice	Customer (uncredited)	MGM	
1947	Jiggs and Maggie in Society	Mrs. Vacuum	Monogram Productions	
1947	Song of Love	Lady with Opera Glasses (uncredited)	MGM	
1947	The Secret Life of Walter Mitty	Floor Manager (uncredited)	Samuel Goldwyn Productions	
1948	Cass Timberlane	Nurse (uncredited)	MGM	
1948	Letter from an Unknown Woman	Frau Kohner (uncredited)	Republic Pictures	
1948	Madonna of the Desert	Mrs. Brown	Republic Pictures	
1948	Luxury Liner	Miss Fenmoor	MGM	
1949	The Barkleys of Broadway	Guest in lobby	MGM	
1949	Jiggs and Maggie in Jackpot Jitters	Mrs. Van Belden	Monogram Productions	
1950	Jiggs and Maggie Out West	Society Woman (uncredited)	Monogram Productions	
1951	Hollywood Story	Self	Universal Pictures	
1955	The Lonesome Trail	Mrs. Wells	L & B Productions	
1956	Lust for Life	Dowager (uncredited)	MGM	
1957	The Helen Morgan Story	Party Guest (uncredited)	Warner Bros.	
1964	My Fair Lady	Lady at Ball (uncredited)	Warner Bros.	
Television
Year	Title	Role	Network/notes	Ref(s)
1952	Racket Squad	Mrs. Burton	1 episode, CBS	
1958	The Lineup	Mrs. DeSues	1 episode, CBS	
