= The Son of Wallingford =

1921 film

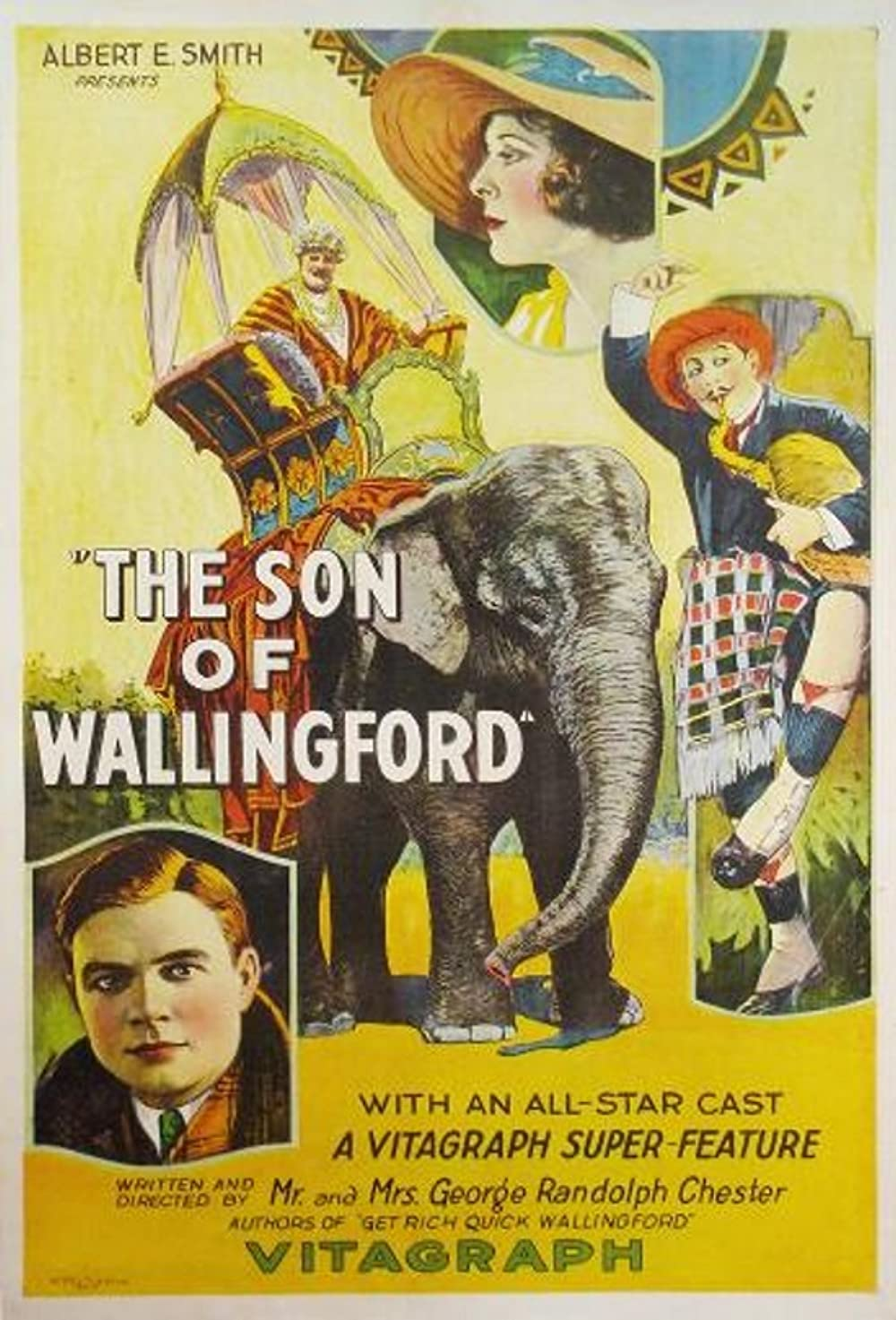
- Directed by: George Randolph Chester; Lillian Josephine Chester
- Written by: George Randolph Chester; Lillian Josephine Chester
- Starring: Wilfrid North; Tom Gallery; Antrim Short
- Cinematography: W. Steve Smith Jr.
- Production company: Vitagraph Company of America
- Distributed by: Vitagraph Company of America
- Release date: October 9, 1921
- Running time: 80 minutes
- Country: United States
- Languages: Silent; English intertitles

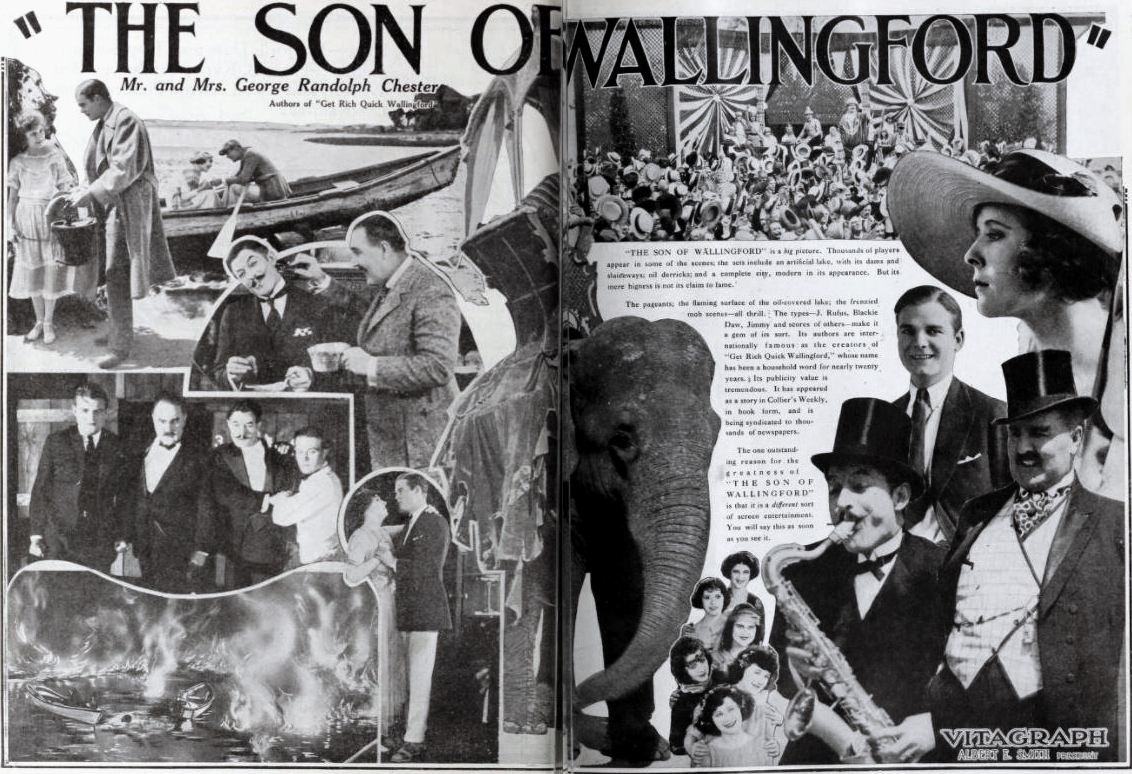
Advertisement for the film

The Son of Wallingford is a 1921 American silent comedy drama film directed by George Randolph Chester and Lillian Josephine Chester and starring Wilfrid North, Tom Gallery and Antrim Short. It is based on George Chester's novel The Son of Wallingford about a confidence trickster, itself inspired by his Cosmopolitan articles and an earlier hit play Get-Rich-Quick Wallingford. It was shot at Vitagraph's Flatbush Studios in Brooklyn. It was released by Vitagraph a couple of months before a Paramount Pictures version of Get-Rich-Quick Wallingford.

== Cast ==
- Wilfrid North as J. Rufus Wallingford
- Tom Gallery as Jimmy Wallkingford
- George Webb as Blackie Daw
- Antrim Short as 'Toad' Edward Jessup
- Van Dyke Brooke as Henry Beegoode
- Sidney D'Albrook as Bertram Beegoode
- Andrew Arbuckle as Talbot Curtis
- Bobbie Mack as O.O. Jones
- Walter Rodgers as 'Petrograd' Pete
- Priscilla Bonner as Mary Curtis
- Florence Hart as Mrs. Fannie Wallingford
- Lila Leslie as Bonnie Daw
- Margaret Cullington as Coline Beegoode

== Preservation ==
The film is lost.

== Bibliography ==
- Connelly, Robert B. The Silents: Silent Feature Films, 1910-36, Volume 40, Issue 2. December Press, 1998.
- Munden, Kenneth White. The American Film Institute Catalog of Motion Pictures Produced in the United States, Part 1. University of California Press, 1997.
