= The Scarlet Car =

The Scarlet Car may refer to:

- The Scarlet Car, a 1906 novel by Richard Harding Davis
- The Scarlet Car (1917 film), an American silent drama film, based on the novel
- The Scarlet Car (1923 film), an American silent drama film, based on the novel
