= The Flaming Hour =

1922 film directed by Edward Sedgwick

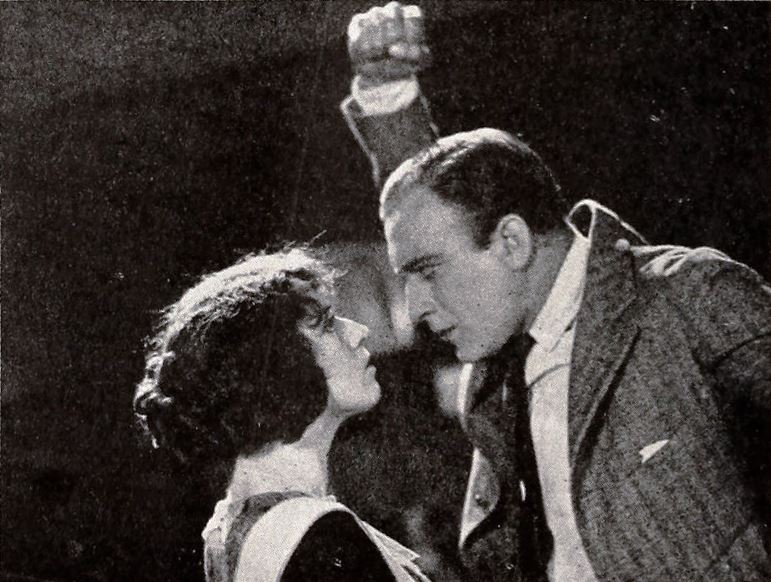
- Still with Ferguson and Mayo
- Directed by: Edward Sedgwick
- Screenplay by: George Randolph Chester
- Story by: Lillian Josephine Chester
- Starring: Frank Mayo; Helen Ferguson; Melbourne MacDowell; Charles Clary; Albert MacQuarrie; Tom Kennedy
- Cinematography: Benjamin H. Kline
- Production company: Universal Film Manufacturing Company
- Distributed by: Universal Film Manufacturing Company
- Release date: December 12, 1922
- Running time: 50 minutes
- Country: United States
- Language: Silent (English intertitles)

The Flaming Hour is a 1922 American drama film directed by Edward Sedgwick and written by George Randolph Chester. The film stars Frank Mayo, Helen Ferguson, Melbourne MacDowell, Charles Clary, Albert MacQuarrie and Tom Kennedy. The film was released on December 12, 1922, by Universal Film Manufacturing Company.

The film is a member of the Universal-produced and Carl Laemmle-selected "The Laemmle Nine", which also includes A Dangerous Game, The Ghost Patrol, Kindled Courage, The Scarlet Car, The Power of a Lie, The First Degree, The Love Letter, and The Gentleman From America.

== Plot ==
As described in a film magazine, the black powder and fireworks plant of Danby and Son is under the management of Bruce Henderson (Mayo). He loves Lucille (Ferguson), daughter of John Danby (MacDowell). Sales manager Richard Mower (Clary) is his rival for Lucille's affections. Bruce and the elder Danby quarrel, and Bruce is discharged, but Lucille stays faithful to him and they are married. Richard takes Bruce's place, but Danby is unaware that the promoted sales manager is stealing from him. The peace of Bruce's wedded life vanishes when Richard makes a call on Lucille. Bruce flares into a rage and makes such an exhibition of himself that his wife leaves him, returning to her father. The deserted husband goes fast downhill, but is still anxious to protect the Danby's from Richard's crooked work in the plant. Bruce, disguised, gets a job as a laborer in the plant and secures final evidence of Richard's guilt. Danby and his daughter enter the plant and witness a robbery executed by Richard and a confederate. Richard locks his employer and Lucille in a vault. Encountering Bruce outside, he fires a shot but misses him. The bullet strikes some fireworks and the plant explodes in sections. Bruce struggles desperately through the furnace of projectiles and exploding dynamite and rescues his wife and her father.

== Cast ==
- Frank Mayo as Bruce Henderson
- Helen Ferguson as Lucille Danby
- Melbourne MacDowell as John Danby
- Charles Clary as Richard Mower
- Albert MacQuarrie as Jones
- Tom Kennedy as Ben
