= The First Degree =

1923 silent film

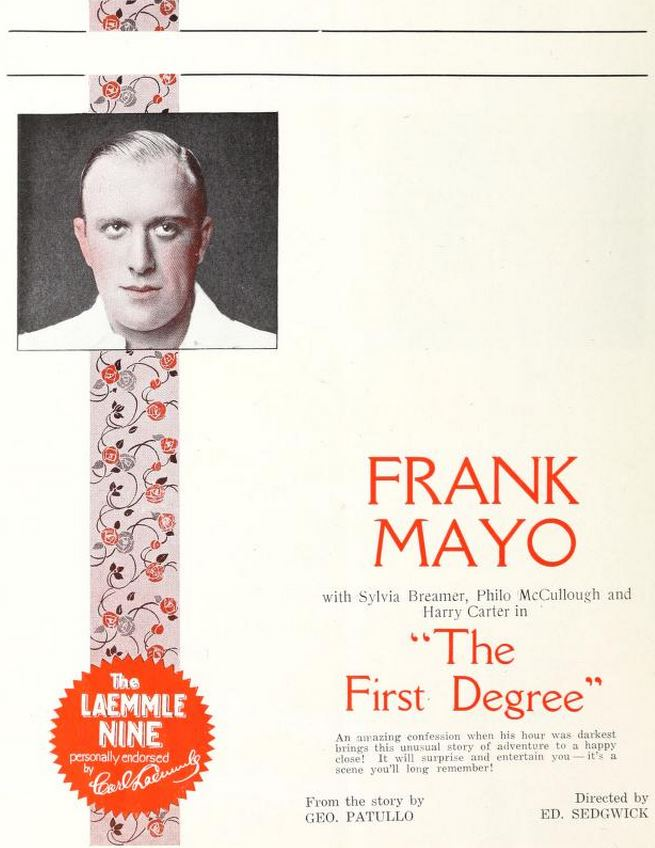
- Ad for The First Degree on page 30 of the December 2, 1922 Universal Weekly
- Directed by: Edward Sedgwick
- Screenplay by: George Randolph Chester; Lillian Josephine Chester
- Based on: The Summons; 1914 story in Saturday Evening Post by George Pattullo
- Starring: Frank Mayo; Sylvia Breamer; Philo McCullough
- Cinematography: Benjamin H. Kline
- Production company: Universal Pictures
- Release date: February 5, 1923
- Running time: 5 reels 50 minutes
- Country: United States
- Language: English intertitles

The First Degree is a silent film from 1923 directed by Edward Sedgwick. The film is a rural melodrama starring Frank Mayo, Sylvia Breamer, and Philo McCullough. A Universal Pictures production, it is one of the Carl Laemmle-endorsed “The Laemmle Nine,” nine films released from Christmas 1922 to February 19, 1923. The screenplay by George Randolph Chester is based on the short story “The Summons” by George Pattullo (published in The Saturday Evening Post in 1914). The cinematography is by Benjamin H. Kline.

Long thought to be a lost film, a complete, partially-tinted 35mm domestic distribution print of the film was discovered at Chicago Film Archives in June 2020 in the Charles E. Krosse Collection, a collection of mostly agricultural and sponsored films produced and distributed by C.L. Venard Productions of Peoria, Illinois. CFA has since digitally preserved the film.

== Plot ==
Sam Bass receives a call from the grand jury of Lincoln County. He is wanted to give testimony in a case involving the theft of his sheep, but before he learns this, he makes a confession regarding the murder of his half-brother Will the previous night. The jury learns the myriad ways his brother has wronged him over the last several years, motivated out of a mutual affection for a woman named Mary. Through flashback, Sam tells the room of how Will had him sent to jail for a year for a bank robbery he did not commit. While in jail, Sam studied law, and he starts life afresh when released. Sam runs for county prosecutor, and all is going well with him until Will arrives, threatening blackmail to exposes his past, which forces Sam to again leave town. Sam gets another start, and he is successful as a sheep farmer in a rural town when Will again appears and blackmails him. A fight takes place, and Sam assumes that he has killed his brother in the scuffle. As he finishes his testimony before the grand jury, much to the surprise of the members, sheriff brings the prisoner in the sheep-stealing case, who is Will.

== Cast ==
- Frank Mayo as Sam Bass
- Sylvia Breamer as Mary
- Philo McCullough as Will Bass
- George A. Williams as Sheriff
- Harry Carter as District Attorney

== See also ==
- List of rediscovered films
