= Dead Men Tell No Tales (1920 film) =

1920 film

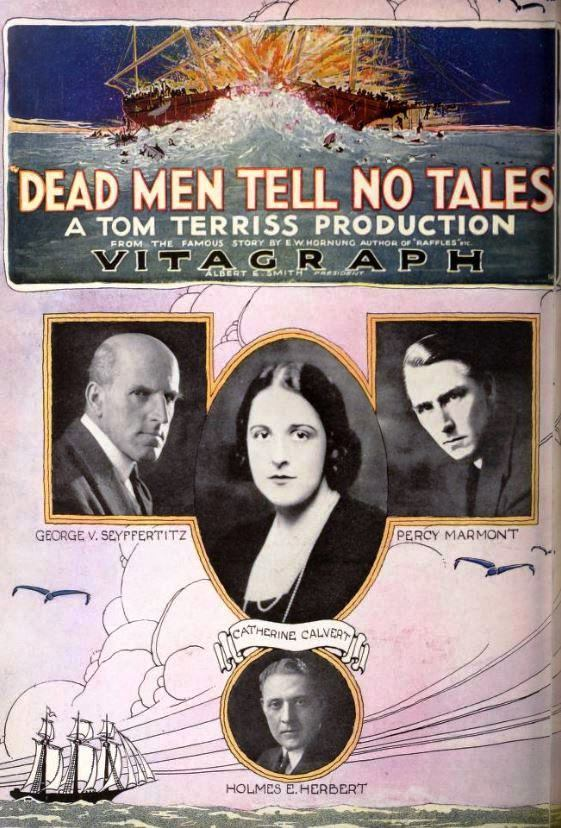
- Advertisement
- Directed by: Tom Terriss
- Written by: George Randolph Chester; Lillian Christy Chester
- Based on: Dead Men Tell No Tales by E. W. Hornung
- Produced by: Albert E. Smith
- Starring: Catherine Calvert; Percy Marmont
- Cinematography: Ernest Haller
- Edited by: Lillian Randolph Chester; George Randolph Chester
- Production company: Vitagraph Company of America
- Distributed by: Vitagraph Company of America
- Release date: November 1920
- Running time: 70 minutes
- Country: United States
- Language: Silent (English intertitles)

Dead Men Tell No Tales is a 1920 American silent adventure film directed by Tom Terriss and starring Catherine Calvert. It was produced by Terriss and the Vitagraph Company of America with distribution by Vitagraph.

== Cast ==
- Catherine Calvert as Eva Dennison
- Percy Marmont as George Stevenson Cole
- Holmes Herbert as Squire John Rattray
- Gustav von Seyffertitz as Señor Joaquin Santos
- Walter James as José
- Roy Applegate as Capt. Harris
- India Wakara as Jane Braithwaite
- Bernard Siegel as Braithwaite

== Preservation ==
With no prints of Dead Men Tell No Tales located in any film archives, it is a lost film.
