= Get-Rich-Quick Wallingford =

Fictional person

Get-Rich-Quick Wallingford is a fictional con artist created by writer George Randolph Chester for a series of stories that first appeared in Cosmopolitan magazine. A book titled Get-Rich-Quick Wallingford: A Cheerful Account of the Rise and Fall of an American Business Buccaneer was published in 1907. J. Rufus Wallingford was also the hero of the following productions:

- Get-Rich-Quick Wallingford, a 1910 Broadway play written by George M. Cohan, with music by Cohan
- The New Adventures of J. Rufus Wallingford, a 1915–1916 film serial produced by the Wharton Studio
- Get-Rich-Quick Wallingford (1916 film), directed by and starring Fred Niblo
- Get-Rich-Quick Wallingford (1921 film), directed by Frank Borzage
- New Adventures of Get Rich Quick Wallingford (1931), starring William Haines as Wallingford and Jimmy Durante as his pickpocket friend
