= The Prodigal Judge =

1911 novel by Vaughan Kester

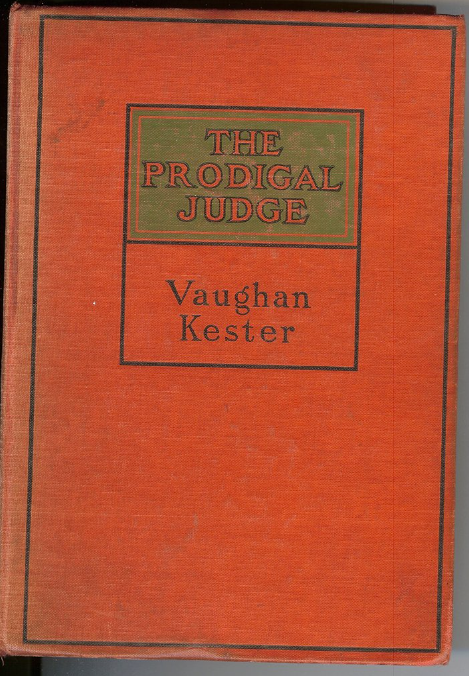
- Author: Vaughan Kester
- Illustrator: M. Leone Bracker
- Language: English
- Publisher: Bobbs-Merrill Company
- Publication date: March 11, 1911
- Publication place: United States
- Media type: Print (hardcover) (448 p.)

The Prodigal Judge is a novel written by American novelist Vaughan Kester and published in 1911.

Kester wrote the novel while living at Gunston Hall in Virginia. A best-seller, it was the second-best selling fiction book in the United States in 1911. Kester died in July 1911, but not before enjoying the knowledge his book had reached the top of the bestseller lists.

To promote the book, publisher Bobbs-Merrill Company held a "book review contest", with prizes of $250, $150, and $100 for the first through third best reviews published in the first month of the book's release, judged by a panel consisting of Yale University professor William Lyon Phelps, magazine editor John Sanborn Phillips, and writer William Allen White. Third place went to H. L. Mencken.

== Adaptations ==
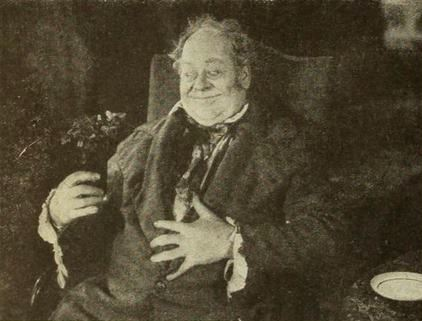
Macklyn Arbuckle in 1922 film version.

It debuted at the Bronx Opera House in December 1913 with George Fawcett playing the judge.

It was also made into a silent film of the same title directed by Edward José, starring Jean Paige and Macklyn Arbuckle (as the judge), released in 1922.
