= The Prodigal Judge (film) =

1922 silent film

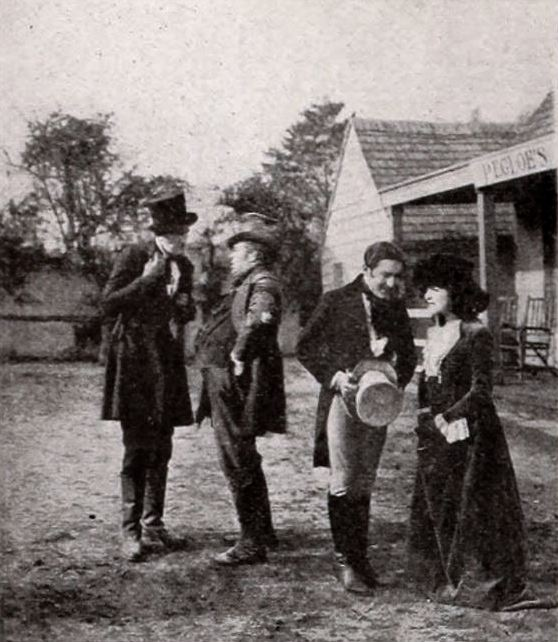
- Directed by: Edward José
- Written by: John Lynch; Edward José
- Based on: The Prodigal Judge by Vaughn Kester
- Produced by: Albert E. Smith
- Starring: Jean Paige; Macklyn Arbuckle; Ernest Torrence
- Cinematography: Charles J. Davis; Joseph Shelderfer
- Production company: Vitagraph Company of America
- Distributed by: Vitagraph Company of America
- Release date: February 19, 1922
- Running time: 80 minutes
- Country: United States
- Languages: Silent; English intertitles

The Prodigal Judge is a 1922 American silent historical drama film directed by Edward José and starring Jean Paige, Macklyn Arbuckle and Ernest Torrence. It is based on the 1911 novel of the same title by Vaughn Kester.

== Cast ==
- Jean Paige as Betty Malroy
- Macklyn Arbuckle as Judge Slocum Price
- Ernest Torrence as Solomon Mahaffy
- Earle Foxe as Bruce Carrington
- Arthur Edmund Carewe as Col. Fentress
- Horace Braham as Charles Norton
- Charles Kent as Gen. Quintard
- Charles Eaton as Hannibal
- Robert Milasch as Bob Yancy
- George Bancroft as Cavendish
- Peggy Shanor as Bess Hicks
- Lillian Van Arsdale as Mrs. Cavendish
- Mary Curran as Mrs. Hicks

== Bibliography ==
- Donald W. McCaffrey & Christopher P. Jacobs. Guide to the Silent Years of American Cinema. Greenwood Publishing, 1999.
