= Chasing the Moon =

Chasing the Moon may refer to:

- Chasing the Moon (1922 film), a lost silent drama film
- Chasing the Moon (TV series), a 2019 documentary
