= The Enemy (1916 film) =

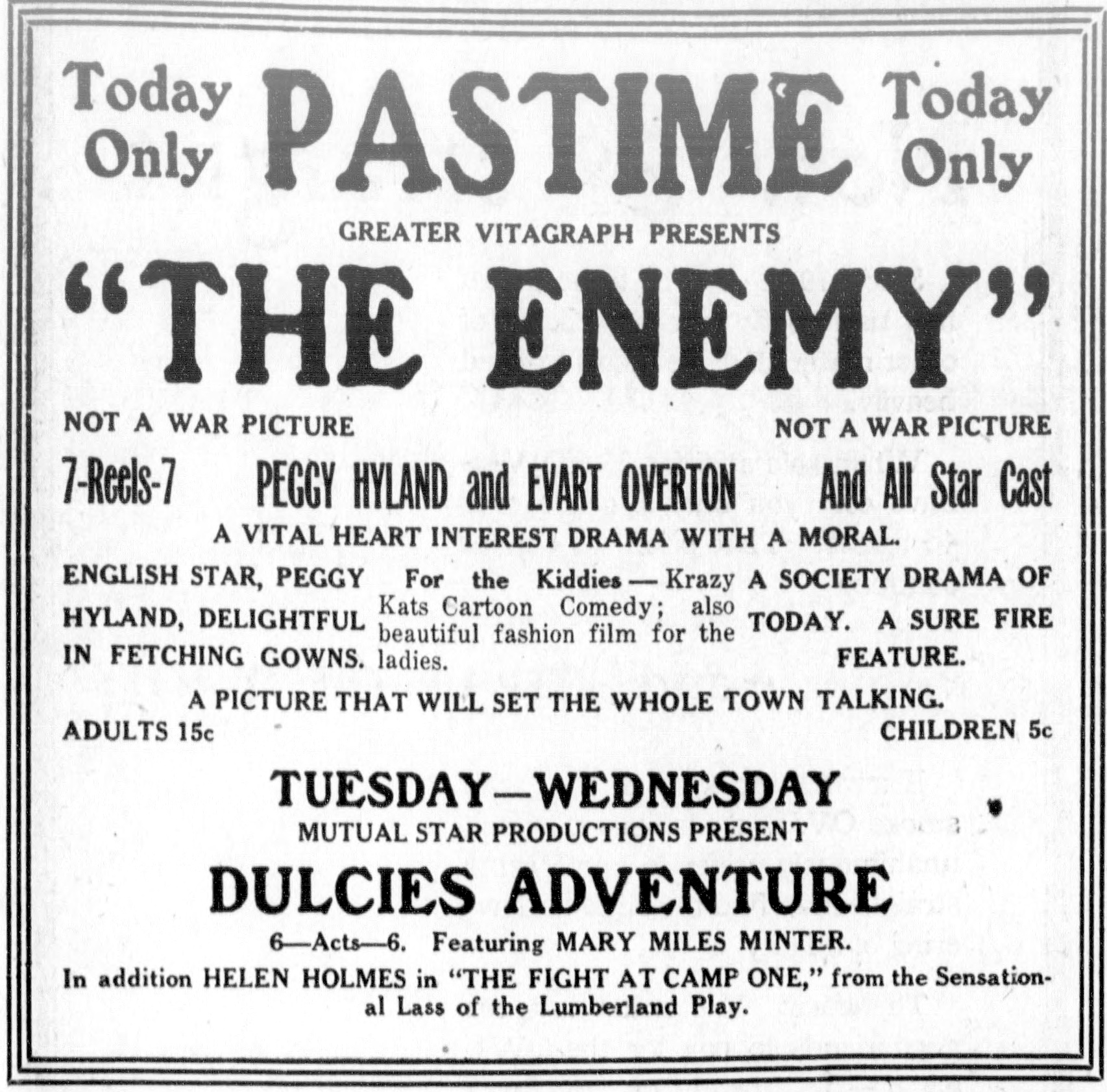
- Newspaper advertisement
- Directed by: Paul Scardon
- Written by: Garfield Thompson
- Based on: a novel by George Randolph Chester and Lillian Chester c.1915
- Produced by: Vitagraph Company of America
- Starring: Charles Kent; Julia Swayne Gordon
- Cinematography: Robert A. Stuart
- Distributed by: V-L-S-E (Greater Vitagraph) Blue Ribbon
- Release date: December 11, 1916
- Running time: 7 reels
- Country: USA
- Language: Silent...English titles

The Enemy is a lost 1916 silent film drama directed by Paul Scardon and starring Charles Kent, Julia Swayne Gordon, Peggy Hyland.

== Cast ==
- Charles Kent – Harrison Stuart
- Julia Swayne Gordon – Mrs. Stuart
- Peggy Hyland – Tavy, the daughter
- Evart Overton – Billy Lane
- Billie Billings – Geraldine
- James Morrison – Tommy Tinkle
- Edward Elkas – Jerry
- Charles Wellesley – B. B. Bennings
