= Kindled Courage =

1923 films

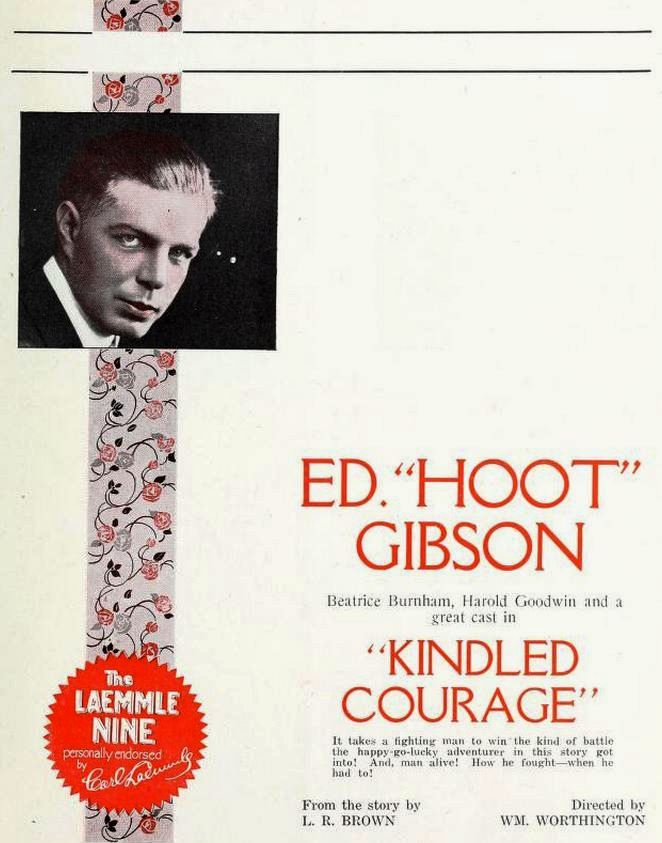
- Ad for film
- Directed by: William Worthington
- Written by: Raymond L. Schrock (scenario)
- Story by: Leete Renick Brown
- Starring: Hoot Gibson
- Cinematography: Virgil Miller
- Release date: January 8, 1923
- Running time: 50 minutes
- Country: United States
- Languages: Silent; English intertitles

Kindled Courage is a 1923 American silent Western film directed by William Worthington and featuring Hoot Gibson. It is not known whether the film currently survives, and it may be a lost film.

The film is a member of the Universal-produced and Carl Laemmle-selected "The Laemmle Nine", which also includes A Dangerous Game, The Flaming Hour, The Ghost Patrol, The Scarlet Car, The Power of a Lie, The First Degree, The Love Letter, and The Gentleman From America.

== Plot ==
As described in a film magazine, after constantly being taunted as being a coward by his friends, Andy Walker (Gibson) decides to skip out for parts unknown. On the next train he hops a freight car in which are two desperadoes. Just as Andy enters the car, the train's brakeman enters and in a gunfight kills both bandits but is badly wounded himself. Terrified, Andy sits in a corner of the car until the train arrives at its next stop, where a posse boards the train and the Sheriff (Russell) hails Andy as a hero. He is appointed Chief Deputy and sent out to hunt Overland Pete (Hart) and his gang. As he is about to leave, Betty Paxton (Burnham), the sister of one of the bandits, arrives seeking her brother. The Sheriff has Andy take her along as a decoy for the gang. On the road Andy falls in love with her. They stumble upon the gang and Andy, through fool luck, kills them off. He goes home a real hero with Betty as his bride.

== Cast ==
- Hoot Gibson as Andy Walker
- Beatrice Burnham as Betty Paxton
- Harold Goodwin as Hugh Paxton
- Harry Tenbrook as Sid Garrett
- J. Gordon Russell as Sheriff (credited as James Gordon Russell)
- Russ Powell as Marshal (credited as J. Russell Powell)

== See also ==
- Hoot Gibson filmography
