= The Message of the Mouse =

1917 film directed by J. Stuart Blackton

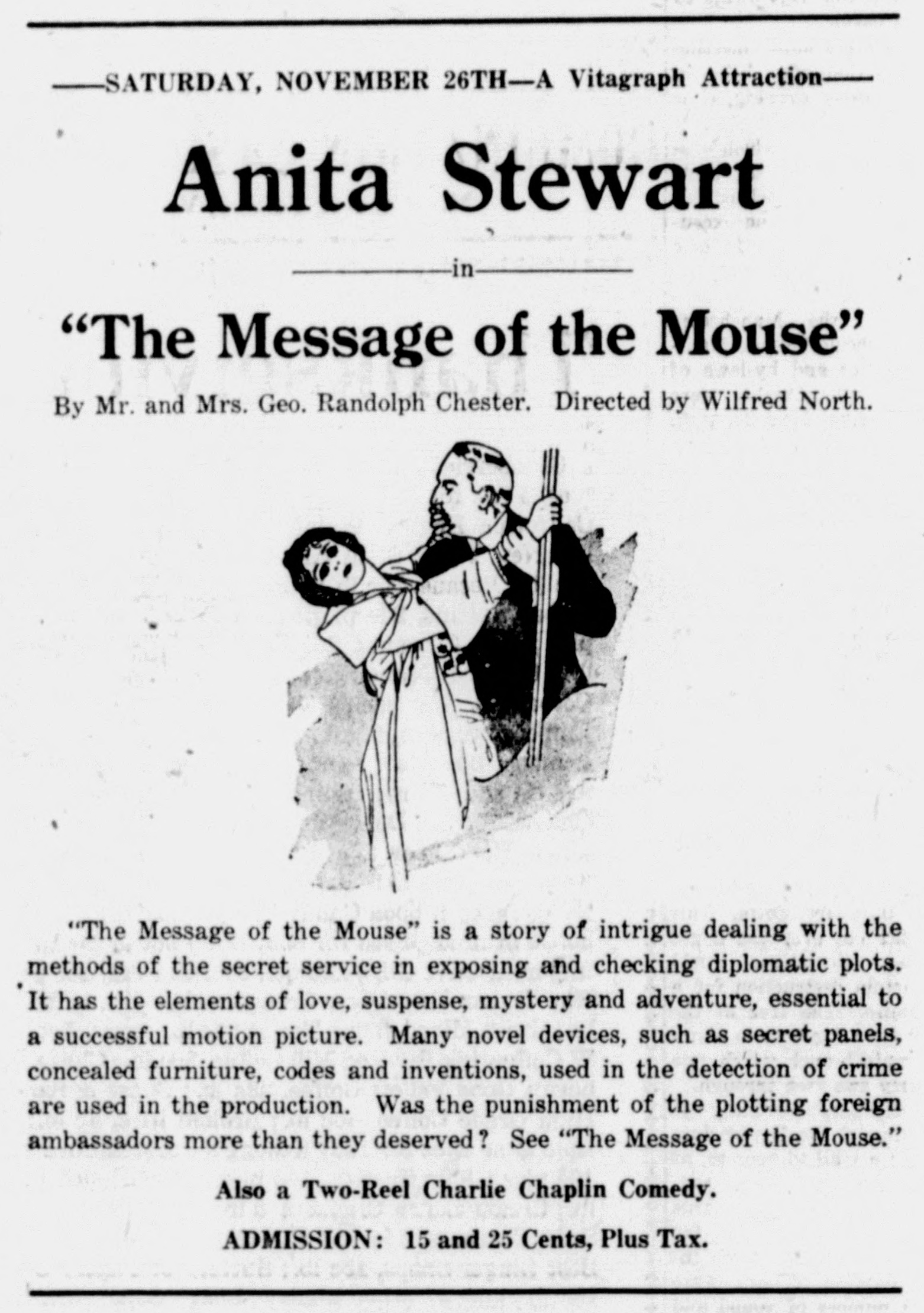
- Newspaper advertisement
- Directed by: J. Stuart Blackton
- Written by: Edward J. Montagne; George Randolph Chester; Lillian Chester
- Starring: Anita Stewart; Julia Swayne Gordon; Rudolph Cameron
- Production company: Vitagraph
- Distributed by: V-L-S-E, Inc.
- Release date: July 9, 1917 (US)
- Running time: 5 reels
- Country: United States
- Language: English

The Message of the Mouse is a 1917 American silent drama film directed by J. Stuart Blackton, written by Edward J. Montagne, George Randolph Chester, and Lillian Chester. The film stars Anita Stewart, Julia Swayne Gordon, and Rudolph Cameron.

== Cast list ==
- Anita Stewart as Wynn Winthrop
- Julia Swayne Gordon as Marcia Elmore
- Rudolph Cameron as Paul Adams
- L. Rogers Lytton as Hallam Varrie
- Franklin Hanna as Henry Winthrop
- Robert Gaillard as Daniel Concord
- Bernard Seigel as Valet
