= The Birth of a Soul =

1920 film directed by Edwin L. Hollywood

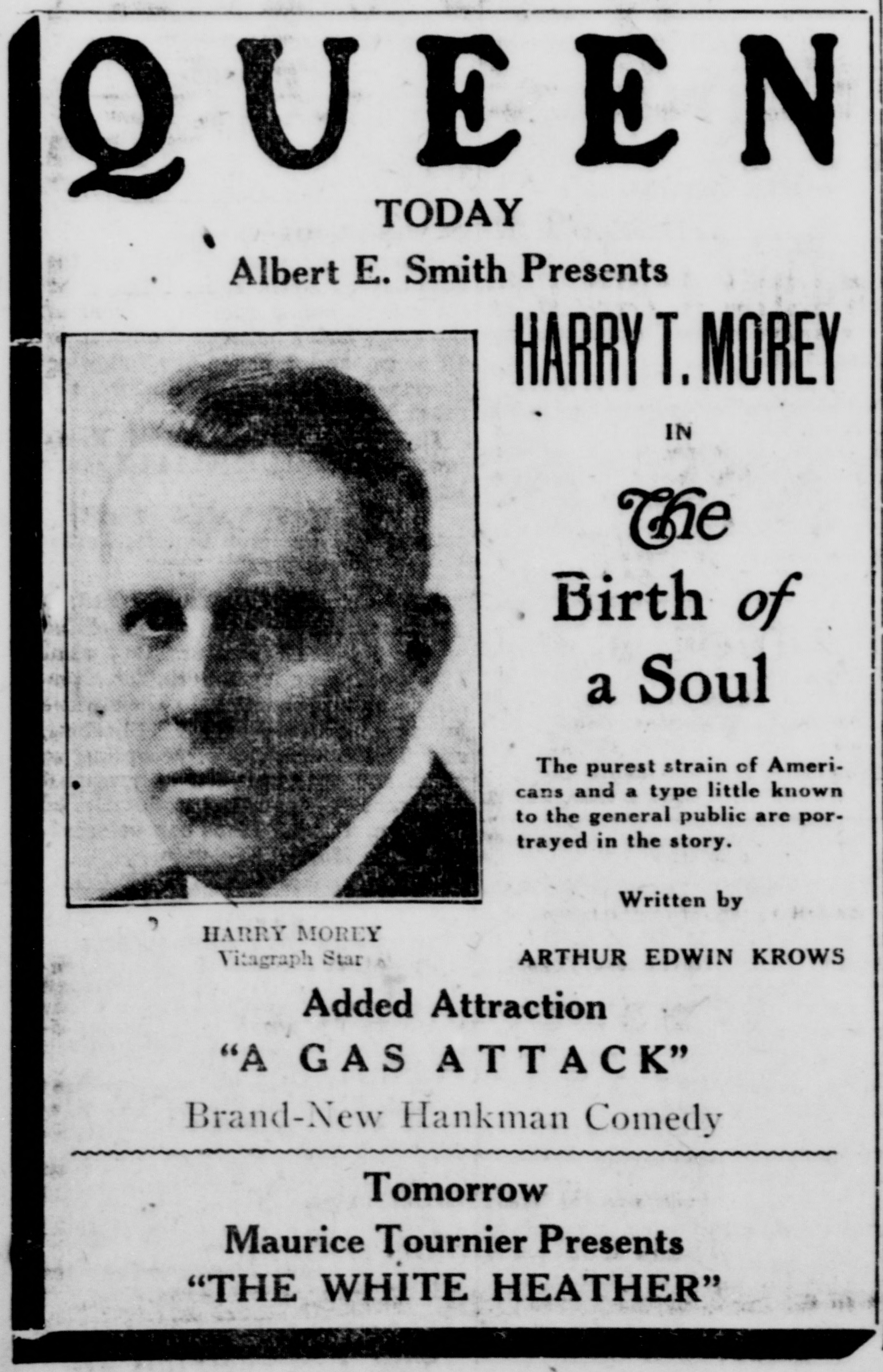
- Contemporary newspaper advertisement
- Directed by: Edwin L. Hollywood
- Written by: Arthur Edwin Krows
- Starring: Harry T. Morey; Jean Paige; Charles Eldridge
- Cinematography: Robert Stuart
- Edited by: George Randolph Chester; Lillian Josephine Chester
- Production company: Vitagraph
- Release date: January 1920 (US)
- Running time: 5 reels
- Country: United States
- Language: English

The Birth of a Soul is a 1920 American silent drama film directed by Edwin L. Hollywood and written by Arthur Edwin Krows. The film stars Harry T. Morey, Jean Paige, and Charles Eldridge.

== Plot ==
Charles Drayton, an attorney from New York City, is in the mountains of the southeastern United States, visiting his relatives. While there, he meets and falls in love with Dorothy Barlow. The Drayton and the Barlow families have a long history of a feud, however it has been dormant for several years. While he is there, Charles' uncle George has an argument with Dorothy's grandfather. The two men fight, resulting in George killing the other man. Dorothy has another suitor, Philip Grey, who is virtually a double of Charles. Philip uses the opportunity of the murder to finger Charles as the murderer, in order to remove the competition. The local sheriff deputizes members of the slain man's family to pursue Charles. He is captured and sentenced to death. However, when Philip finds out that Charles and Dorothy have been secretly married, he exchanges places with Charles, and goes to his death on the gallows.

== Cast ==
- Harry T. Morey as Philip Grey/Charles Drayton
- Jean Paige as Dorothy Barlow
- Charles Eldridge as Lem Barlow
- George Cooper as Joe Barlow
- Charles Kent as Hap Barlow
- Walter P. Lewis as George Drayton
- Robert Gaillard as Parson
- Bernard Siegel as the Sheriff

== Production ==
The film was shot in the mountains of North Carolina.

== Reception ==
The Asbury Park Press called the film a "remarkable story" and compared the film's climactic scene with that from A Tale of Two Cities. The Fort Worth Record-Telegram also gave the film a good review, stating it had "elements of a good story, mistaken identity, family feud, love that is willing to sacrifice the being for the good of another and a man who makes good by doing a noble thing." And that the film "has these elements blended and interwoven in the proper proportions to present a fabric that will stand the test of strength and consistency." The complimented the acting of both Harry Morey and Jean Paige, stating that Morey's performance in a difficult role "stamps him as an artist of more than usual merit." The Atlantic City Gazette-Review gave the film a glowing review, calling it "a gripping feature", which was a "powerful dramatic tale of a strong man who deliberately sacrifices all in order to save the life of a rival for the love of a pretty girl."
