= Black Beauty (1921 film) =

1921 film

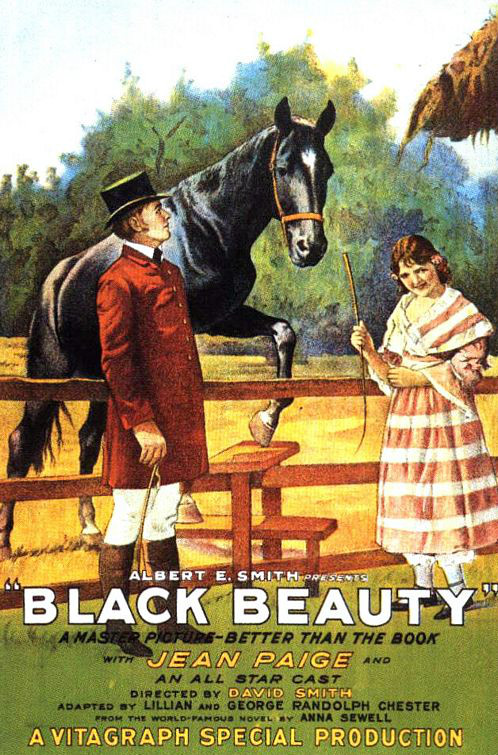
- Film poster
- Directed by: David Smith
- Screenplay by: George Randolph Chester; William B. Courtney; Lillian Chester
- Based on: the novel by Anna Sewell
- Produced by: Albert E. Smith
- Starring: Jean Paige; James Morrison; George Webb
- Cinematography: Reginald Lyons
- Production company: Vitagraph Company of America
- Distributed by: Vitagraph Company of America
- Release date: January 1921 (U.S.)
- Running time: 70 minutes; 7 reels
- Country: United States
- Language: Silent (English intertitles)

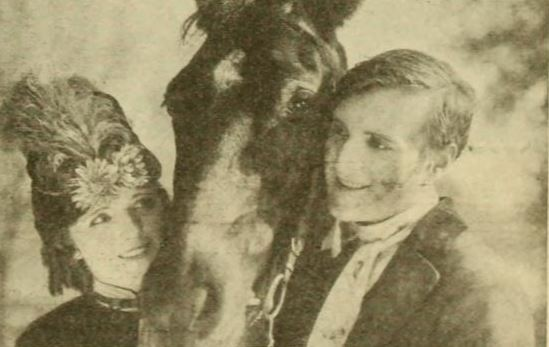
Still with Paige and Morrison from Photoplay magazine

Black Beauty is a 1921 American silent drama film version of Anna Sewell's 1877 novel of the same name. Black Beauty is an autobiography of a horse, who tells the story of his life and of the people surrounding it. This film exists in an incomplete state with three of seven reels preserved at the Library of Congress.

A competing/rival independent film of the same story was also released in early 1921 starring Claire Adams and Pat O'Malley. It was produced by Eskay Harris Feature Film Company.

== Plot ==
As summarized in a film publication, a human love story was added to the horse story, which includes a fox hunt and race. At a house party given by Squire Gordon, his daughter Jessie and Harry Blomefield are playing games with the children, although they have reached the age where Harry realizes that he loves her.

Among the guests is Jack Beckett, who lives by his wits and has gained entree as a favorite of the haughty Lady Wynsaring. Squire Gordon gives Lord Wynwaring £800 for his wife's charity, which Jack steals from the Wynwaring room. During a fox hunt the next morning, Jessie's brother George is killed in a fall from his horse. Jack puts the stolen money in the pocket of the dead man and tells Jessie that her brother was a thief. To prevent him from telling her mother, Jessie agrees to marry Jack when she comes of age.

Jessie meanwhile realizes that she loves Harry, who cannot understand her wish to marry Jack. Several years pass and Harry tries to elope with Jessie, but is foiled. After a race sequence, Black Beauty carries Harry to victory and to Jessie, foiling the plans of the villain Jack.

== Cast ==
- Jean Paige as Jessie Gordon
- James Morrison as Harry Blomefield
- George Webb as Jack Beckett
- Bobby Mack as Derby Ghost
- John Steppling as Squire Gordon
- Leslie T. Peacocke as Lord Wynwaring
- Adele Farrington as Lady Wynsaring
- Chick Morrison as John Manly
- Mollie McConnell as Mrs. Gordon (*posthumous release for Mollie, she died in 1920)
- Colin Kenny as George Gordon
- Georgia French as Flora Gordon
- Robert Bolder as Vicar Blomefield
- Margaret Mann as Mrs. Blomefield
- George C. Pearce as Farmer Grey
- James Connelly as Fat Bailiff
- Robert Milasch as Lean Bailiff
- James Donnelly

== Production ==
For its 1929 re-release, the film was cut to 35 minutes.

The 2026 reconstruction of Black Beauty released by Harpodeon, which combines the surviving parts of the original release with its 1929 abridgment, runs approximately 72 minutes.

== See also ==
- List of films about horses
