= Doughboys (film) =

1930 film by Edward Sedgwick

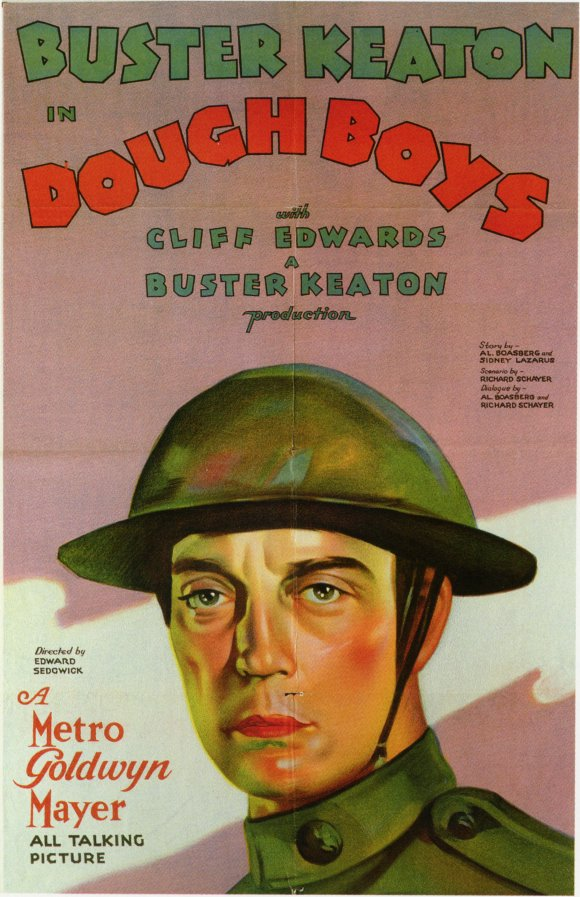
- Directed by: Edward Sedgwick
- Written by: Al Boasberg; Richard Schayer; Sidney Lazarus
- Starring: Buster Keaton; Sally Eilers; Cliff Edwards; Edward Brophy
- Cinematography: Leonard Smith
- Edited by: William LeVanway
- Music by: William Axt
- Production company: Metro-Goldwyn-Mayer
- Distributed by: Metro-Goldwyn-Mayer
- Release date: August 30, 1930
- Running time: 79 minutes
- Country: United States
- Language: English

Doughboys is a 1930 American Pre-Code comedy film starring Buster Keaton. It was Keaton's second starring talkie vehicle and has been called Keaton's "most successful sound Picture." A Spanish-language version was also made under the title, De Frente, Marchen (which is considered lost).

== Plot ==
Doughboys (1930)

Elmer, a member of the idle rich, is smitten by working girl Mary, who will have nothing to do with him. When Elmer's chauffeur gets caught up in an army recruitment drive and quits, Elmer goes to an employment agency to find a new driver and accidentally enlists in the army. Elmer learns that Mary is on the base to entertain the troops and learns that his drill sergeant, Brophy, is also interested in Mary.

== Cast ==
- Buster Keaton as Elmer
- Sally Eilers as Mary
- Cliff Edwards as Nescopeck
- Edward Brophy as Sgt. Brophy
- Victor Potel as Svendenburg
- Arnold Korff as Gustav
- Frank Mayo as Captain Scott
- Pitzy Katz as Abie Cohn
- William Steele as Lieutenant Randolph
- Edward Sedgwick as Guggleheimer the Camp Cook (uncredited)
- Bert Roach as chubby soldier (uncredited)

== Reception ==
Keaton had creative input in Doughboys, which was partly inspired by his own experience in World War I. Although the writers kept inserting puns and verbal jokes into the script, Keaton insisted that his dialogue, at least, be less "jokey." Keaton felt that Doughboys was the best of the films he made for MGM.
