= Julia Swayne Gordon =

American actress

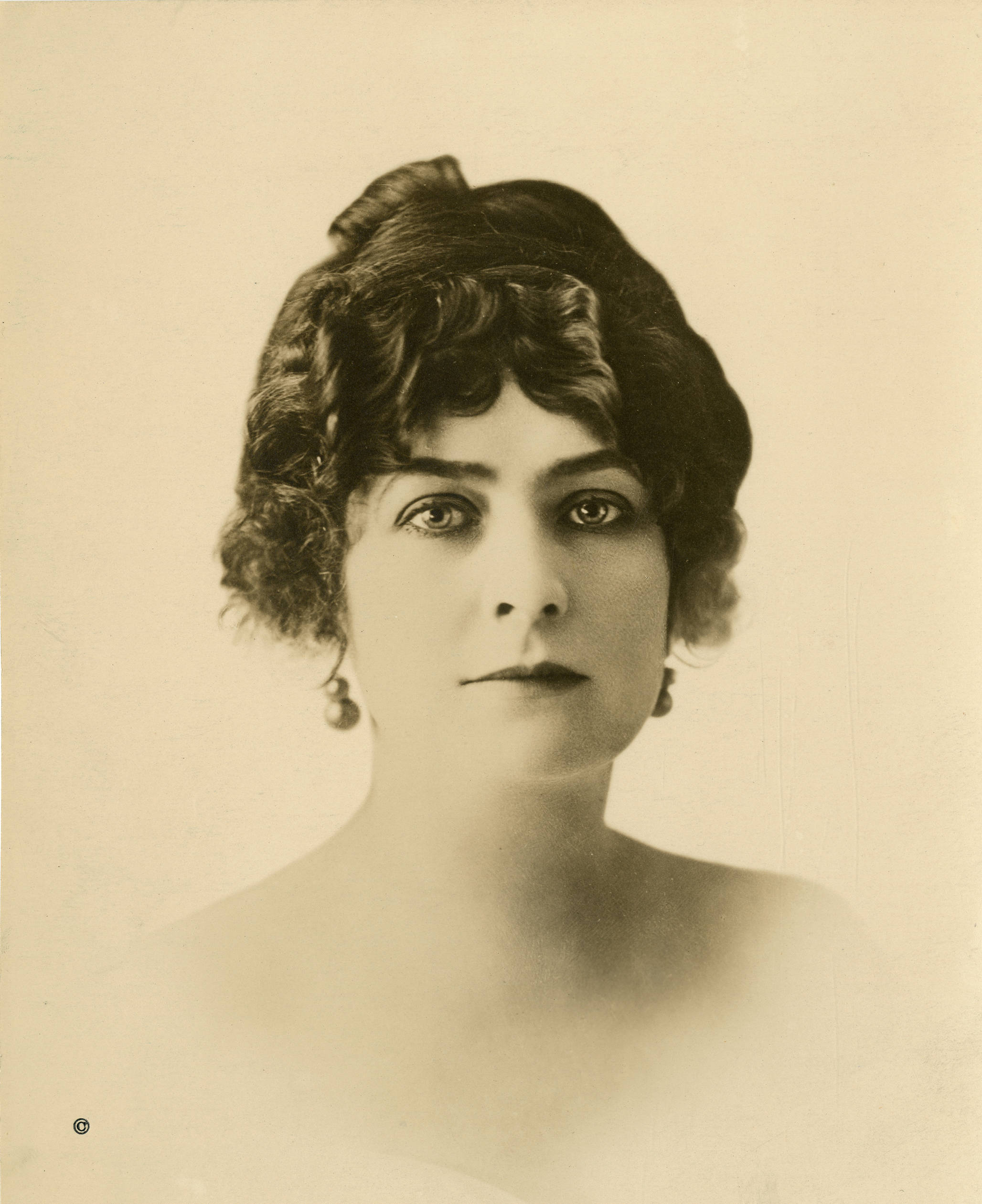
- Gordon in 1923
- Born: Sarah Victoria Smith; October 29, 1878; Columbus, Ohio, U.S.
- Died: May 28, 1933 (aged 54); Hollywood, Los Angeles, California, U.S.
- Resting place: Green Lawn Cemetery
- Occupation: Actress
- Years active: 1903–1933
- Spouse: Hugh T. Swayne

Julia Swayne Gordon (born Sarah Victoria Smith; October 29, 1878 – May 28, 1933) was an American actress who appeared in at least 228 films between 1908 and 1933.

== Early years ==
Gordon was born in Columbus, Ohio to Louis and Anna Smith and was educated there. She went to Denver to study dramatics under Jessie Bonstelle.

== Career ==
Gordon moved to New York and acted in stock theater, performing with Henrietta Crosman and James A. Herne.

Gordon's work in film began in 1905 with the Edison Company, and in 1908 she moved to Vitagraph Studios. In 1911 she starred in Vitagraph's screen portrayal of the Lady Godiva legend. Perhaps her most memorable performance, however, is as Richard Arlen's mother in the World War I silent film Wings (1927), which won the first Academy Award for Best Picture. In a highly dramatic scene in that acclaimed production, Gordon bids farewell to Arlen as he departs for combat flight training in France, tearfully packing him off with his favorite childhood toy.

== Personal life and death ==
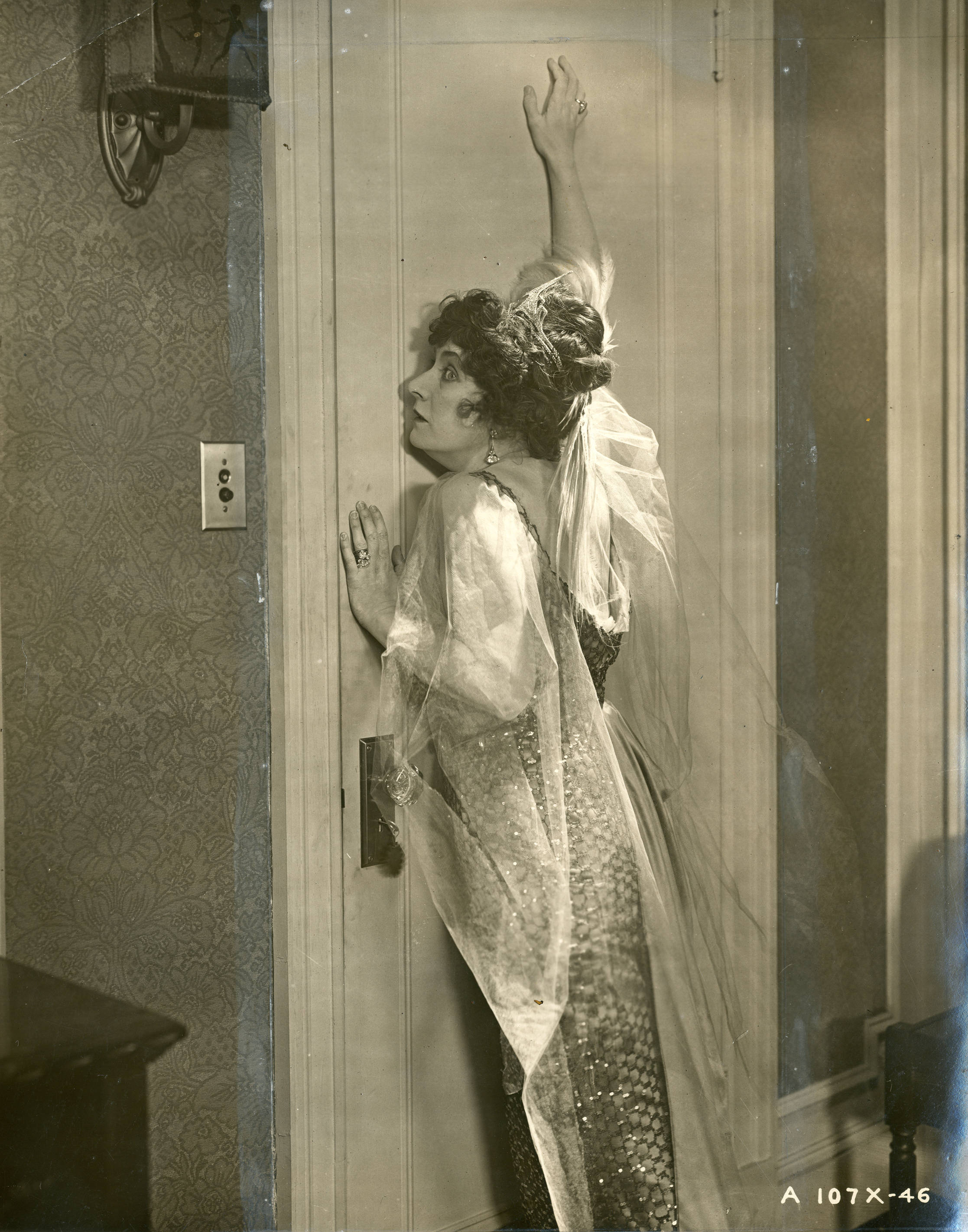
Gordon performing in 1922.

Gordon was married to Hugh T. Swayne.

Gordon continued to act until her death. On May 28, 1933, she died of cancer at her Hollywood home, aged 54. Her ashes are buried at Green Lawn Cemetery in Columbus, Ohio.

== Partial filmography ==
- A Midsummer Night's Dream (1909)*short
- Twelfth Night (1910*short
- Uncle Tom's Cabin (1910)*short
- A Tale of Two Cities (1911)*short
- Lady Godiva (1911)*short
- Captain Jenks' Dilemma (1912)*short
- Playmates (1912)
- Beau Brummel (1913)*short
- Red and White Roses (1913)*short
- The Lion's Bride (1913)*short
- The Battle Cry of Peace (1915)
- My Lady's Slipper (1916)
- The Suspect (1916)
- The Enemy (1916)
- Her Right to Live (1917)
- Arsene Lupin (1917)
- The Maelstrom (1917)
- The Message of the Mouse (1917)
- Love Watches (1918)
- Over the Top (1918)
- Two Women (1919)
- Greater Than Fame (1920)
- Lifting Shadows (1920)
- A Child for Sale (1920)
- For Love or Money (1920)
- The Silver Lining (1921)
- The Passionate Pilgrim (1921)
- Behind Masks (1921)
- Burn 'Em Up Barnes (1921)
- Why Girls Leave Home (1921)
- Handcuffs or Kisses (1921)
- How Women Love (1922)
- When the Desert Calls (1922)
- My Old Kentucky Home (1922)
- Till We Meet Again (1922)
- What's Wrong With the Women? (1922)
- Women Men Marry (1922)
- The Darling of the Rich (1922)
- The Tie That Binds (1923)
- Scaramouche (1923)
- Dark Secrets (1923)
- The Wheel (1925)
- Lights of Old Broadway (1925)
- The Far Cry (1926)
- Early to Wed (1926)
- Bride of the Storm (1926)
- Diplomacy (1926)
- It (1927)
- Wings (1927)
- Children of Divorce (1927)
- The Smart Set (1928)
- Three Weekends (1928)
- Hearts of Men (1928)
- Road House (1928)
- The Younger Generation (1929)
- The Eternal Woman (1929)
- Gold Diggers of Broadway (1929)
- Is Everybody Happy? (1929)
- Today (1930)
- Primrose Path (1931)
- The Common Law (1931)
- The Drums of Jeopardy (1931)
- Misbehaving Ladies (1931)
- Secrets of the French Police (1932)
