= The Winchester Woman =

1919 film by Wesley Ruggles

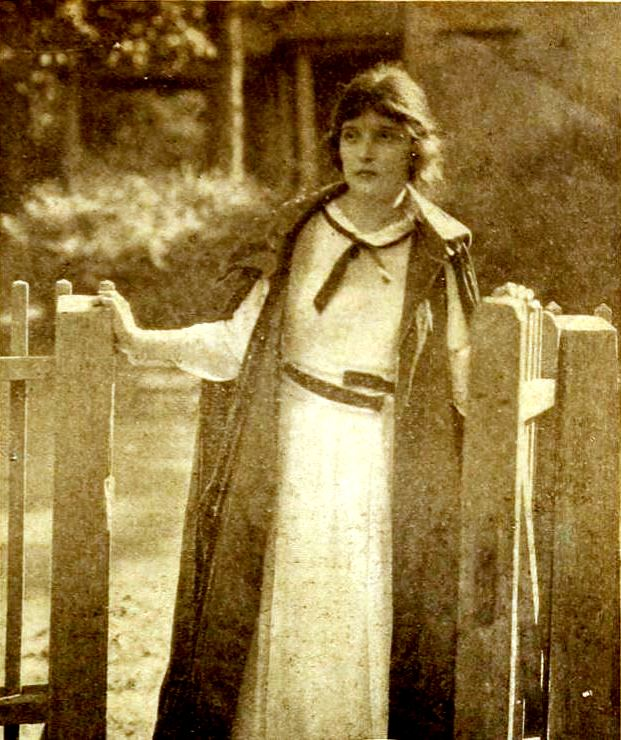
- Still with Alice Joyce
- Directed by: Wesley Ruggles
- Written by: Horace Hazeltine; Arthur E. Krows
- Starring: Alice Joyce; Percy Marmont; Robert Middlemass
- Cinematography: Joseph Shelderfer
- Production company: Vitagraph Company of America
- Distributed by: Vitagraph Company of America
- Release date: September 1919
- Running time: 5 reels
- Country: United States
- Language: Silent (English intertitles)

The Winchester Woman is a 1919 American silent crime film directed by Wesley Ruggles and starring Alice Joyce, Percy Marmont, and Robert Middlemass.

== Cast ==
- Alice Joyce as Agatha Winchester
- Percy Marmont as David Brinton
- Robert Middlemass as Alan Woodward
- Jean Armour as Alma Fielder
- Lucy Fox as Julia Brinton
- Joseph Burke as Simon Scudder

== Bibliography ==
- Donald W. McCaffrey & Christopher P. Jacobs. Guide to the Silent Years of American Cinema. Greenwood Publishing, 1999. ISBN 0-313-30345-2
