= Edward Sedgwick =

American film director and screenwriter

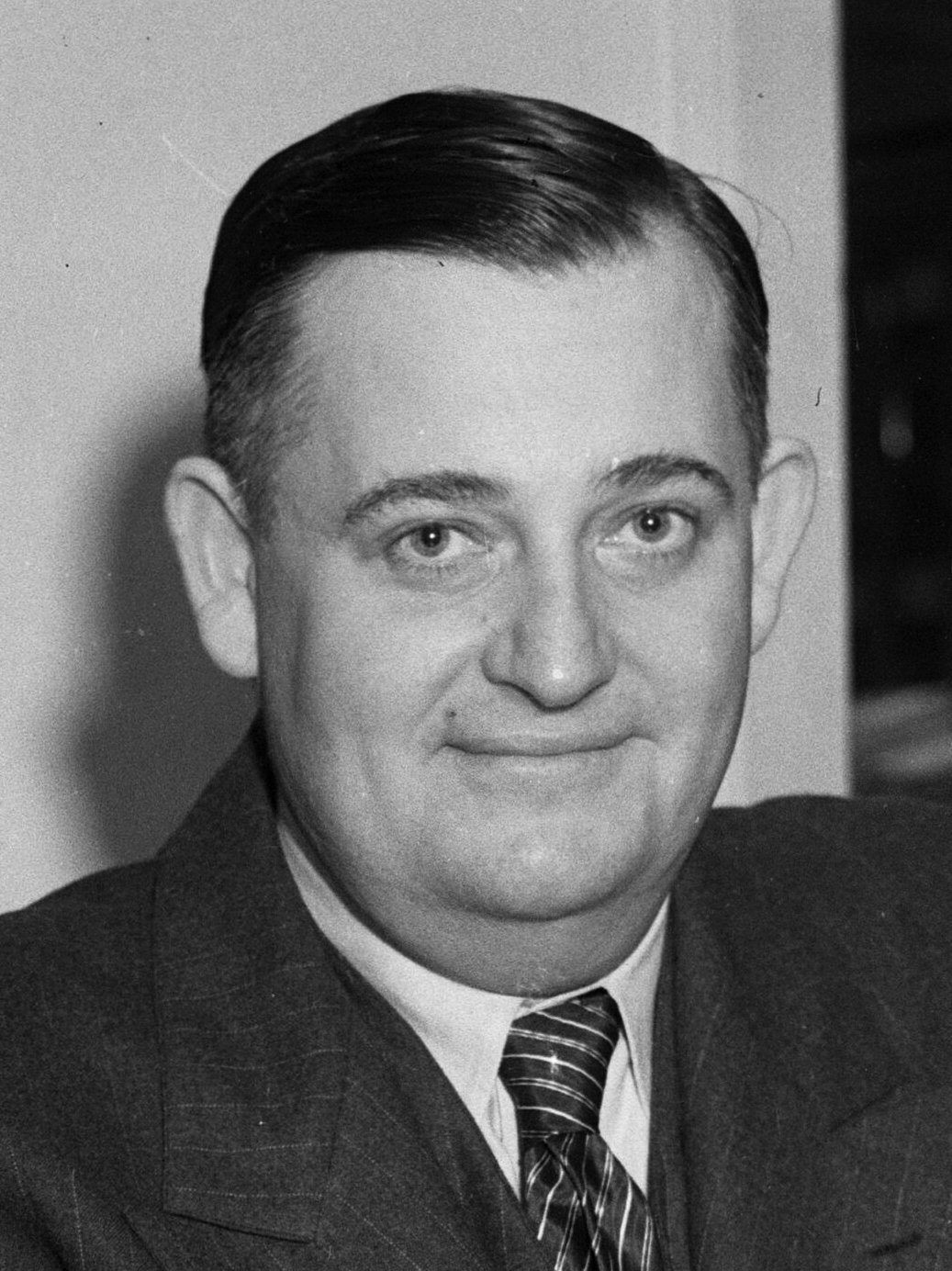
- Sedgwick in 1933
- Born: November 7, 1889; Galveston, Texas, U.S.
- Died: May 7, 1953 (aged 63); North Hollywood, California, U.S.
- Resting place: Holy Cross Cemetery, Culver City
- Other names: Edgar Sedgwick; Ed Segwick
- Education: St. Mary's University of Galveston; Peacock Military Academy
- Occupations: Film director; screenwriter; actor; film producer
- Years active: 1915–1953
- Known for: Chasing the Moon; The Flaming Frontier; Broadway or Bust; Riding on Air; I Love Lucy
- Spouse: Ebba Havez
- Relatives: Eileen Sedgwick (sister); Josie Sedgwick (sister)

Edward Martin Sedgwick (November 7, 1889 – May 7, 1953) was an American film director, writer, actor and producer.

== Early life ==
Edward Martin Sedgwick was born in Galveston, Texas, the son of Edward Sedgwick Sr. and Josephine Walker, both stage actors. At the age of four, young Edward Sedgwick joined his show business family in what was then the Sedgwick Comedy Company, a vaudeville act, doing a "singing speciality". He played child parts and did vaudeville acts until he was seven, when he was given his first comedy part, that of an Irish immigrant, in a comedy written by his father called Just Over.

During this time, he was only on stage during the summer months. In winter his father took him back to Galveston for sent school. He graduated from St. Mary's University of Galveston, and was then sent to the Peacock Military Academy in San Antonio, from which he graduated with the rank of first lieutenant. After graduation, he seriously contemplated a military life but the lure of the stage proved stronger and so he rejoined his father's company, now known as "The Five Sedgwicks." The troupe consisted of his parents, himself and his two sisters. Forced to close the act due to his father's illness, Sedgwick went into musical comedy and soon had a company of his own, known as "The Cabaret Girls," produced, directed and managed by himself. The company was very successful, and it was only after repeated offers from Romaine Fielding that he was induced, at the end of his third successful season, to disband his company and become a film-actor.

The two other family members were Edward's twin sisters Eileen and Josie, who both later pursued successful silent-movie acting careers. Sedgwick broke into films as a comedian in 1915, frequently cast as a zany baseball player. He then became a serial director six years later in 1921, and moved on to the Tom Mix western unit. Sedgwick's love of baseball came in handy for the ballpark sequences of Mix's Stepping Out, Buck Jones’ Hit and Run, William Haines’ Slide, Kelly, Slide, Buster Keaton’s The Cameraman, and Robert Young’s Death on the Diamond.

== Career ==
Sedgwick signed with MGM in 1926. When Buster Keaton joined the company in 1928, Sedgwick found a kindred spirit and a fellow baseball enthusiast. Sedgwick (known informally as "Ed" or "Junior") directed all but one of Keaton's MGM features: The Cameraman, Spite Marriage, Free and Easy, Doughboys (in which Sedgwick appears on screen as a dumb soldier), Parlor, Bedroom and Bath, Speak Easily, and What! No Beer?. In 1936 Sedgwick briefly became a producer-director at Hal Roach Studios. There, he made Mr. Cinderella and Pick a Star, both starring Jack Haley; Pick a Star featured a guest appearance by Laurel and Hardy. Between 1938 and 1940 Sedgwick directed Joe E. Brown (another baseball buddy) in five comedy features.

Sedgwick proved himself as a capable director of offbeat subjects (including a few murder mysteries). This earned him an assignment to direct Eyes in the Night (1942), which featured the novel characterization of a genial private detective who is blind. Producer Jack Chertok, judging Sedgwick's approach too breezy, replaced Sedgwick with promising short-subject director Fred Zinnemann. Sedgwick was reassigned to a more suitable project, the Laurel and Hardy comedy Air Raid Wardens. It was his last assignment for three years, but he remained on the MGM payroll, sharing an office with the almost-as-idle Buster Keaton.

Lucille Ball, under contract to MGM, spent much of her free time with Sedgwick and Keaton. When the studio remade its 1936 hit Libeled Lady (as Easy to Wed, 1946), Ball was one of the stars, and she recruited Sedgwick and Keaton to stage a physical-comedy sequence involving duck hunting.

Sedgwick next worked on the Red Skelton comedy A Southern Yankee (1948). Two sources differ on Sedgwick's participation. Author Michael Zmuda wrote that S. Sylvan Simon directed the film in its entirety, despite Sedgwick's screen credit. Another source, Keaton biographer James Curtis, says that Simon had indeed filmed A Southern Yankee in its entirety, but it previewed so poorly that producer Paul Jones asked Buster Keaton and Edward Sedgwick to add new gags, and writer Nat Perrin to insert their material into a revised script. Between them they fashioned 40 pages of sight gags, including a horse-and-buggy chase and a Civil War skirmish (which Red Skelton halts by carrying both Union and Confederate flags). Sedgwick directed the retakes, which saved the film, and received sole credit as director.

In September 1950 Sedgwick and Keaton worked on the Red Skelton comedy Excuse My Dust (released 1951), assisting director Roy Rowland. It was their final project for MGM; dozens of longtime employees, including Sedgwick and Keaton, were released by the studio as an economy measure in 1950. Sedgwick's final released film was Universal's Ma and Pa Kettle Back on the Farm (filmed 1952, released 1953), featuring a Keatonesque railroad chase.

== New opportunity ==
In 1952 Lucille Ball and Desi Arnaz, then enjoying enormous popularity in their I Love Lucy television series, pursued the idea of compiling a few first-season episodes into a full-length feature film. Ball asked her old friend Ed Sedgwick to direct new scenes connecting the footage already prepared for television. Sedgwick was careful to make the new scenes match the old ones and turned in an efficient job. Ball and Arnaz named him a senior officer in their new Lucille Ball-Desi Arnaz Film Company.

The completed feature was previewed successfully in a Bakersfield, California theater. Ball and Arnaz were set to release the film through United Artists until MGM intervened—the studio had already signed Ball and Arnaz for a new feature film, and didn't want the I Love Lucy film to blunt the MGM film's potential appeal. Ball and Arnaz reluctantly shelved their own film, and Edward Sedgwick's final picture went unreleased. Decades later it was rediscovered, and released to home video in 2010 under the title I Love Lucy: The Movie.

== Death ==
On May 7, 1953, Sedgwick died of a heart attack at his home in North Hollywood, Los Angeles, at the age of 63. He is buried in Holy Cross Cemetery in Culver City.

== Rediscovered film ==
Sedgwick's 1923 silent film The First Degree was long thought to have been a lost film until a complete copy was discovered at the Chicago Film Archives. Chicago Film Archives has preserved and digitally transferred the film.

== Filmography ==
- The Haunted Pajamas (1917)
- Fantômas (1920)
- Live Wires (1921)
- The Rough Diamond (1921)
- Bar Nothing (1921)
- Boomerang Justice (1922)
- The Bearcat (1922)
- The Flaming Hour (1922)
- Chasing the Moon (1922)
- Do and Dare (1922)
- Out of Luck (1923)
- Romance Land (1923)
- Single Handed (1923)
- The Gentleman from America (1923)
- Dead Game (1923)
- Shootin' for Love (1923)
- The First Degree (1923)
- Blinky (1923)
- The Ramblin' Kid (1923)
- The Thrill Chaser (1923)
- Hook and Ladder (1924)
- Ride for Your Life (1924)
- 40-Horse Hawkins (1924)
- Broadway or Bust (1924)
- The Sawdust Trail (1924)
- Hit and Run (1924)
- The Ridin' Kid from Powder River (1924)
- The Hurricane Kid (1925)
- The Saddle Hawk (1925)
- Let 'er Buck (1925)
- Lorraine of the Lions (1925)
- The Phantom of the Opera (1925)
- Two-Fisted Jones (1925)
- The Runaway Express (1926)
- Tin Hats (1926)
- The Flaming Frontier (1926)
- Under Western Skies (1926)
- There You Are! (1926)
- Slide, Kelly, Slide (1927)
- The Bugle Call (1927)
- Spring Fever (1927)
- West Point (1927)
- Circus Rookies (1928)
- The Cameraman (1928)
- Spite Marriage (1929)
- Free and Easy (1930)
- Estrellados (1930)
- Doughboys (1930)
- Remote Control (1930)
- Parlor, Bedroom and Bath (1931)
- Maker of Men (1931)
- A Dangerous Affair (1931)
- The Big Shot (1931)
- The Passionate Plumber (1932)
- Speak Easily (1932)
- What! No Beer? (1933)
- Horse Play (1933)
- Saturday's Millions (1933)
- The Poor Rich (1934)
- I'll Tell the World (1934)
- Death on the Diamond (1934)
- Here Comes the Groom (1934)
- Father Brown, Detective (1934)
- Murder in the Fleet (1935)
- The Virginia Judge (1935)
- Mr. Cinderella (1936)
- Pick a Star (1937)
- Riding on Air (1937)
- Fit for a King (1937)
- The Gladiator (1938)
- Burn 'Em Up O'Connor (1939)
- Beware Spooks! (1939)
- So You Won't Talk (1940)
- Air Raid Wardens (1943)
- Easy to Wed (1946)
- A Southern Yankee (1948)
- Excuse My Dust (1951)
- Ma and Pa Kettle Back on the Farm (1951)
- I Love Lucy (1953)
