= Slide, Kelly, Slide =

1927 film directed by Edward Sedgwick

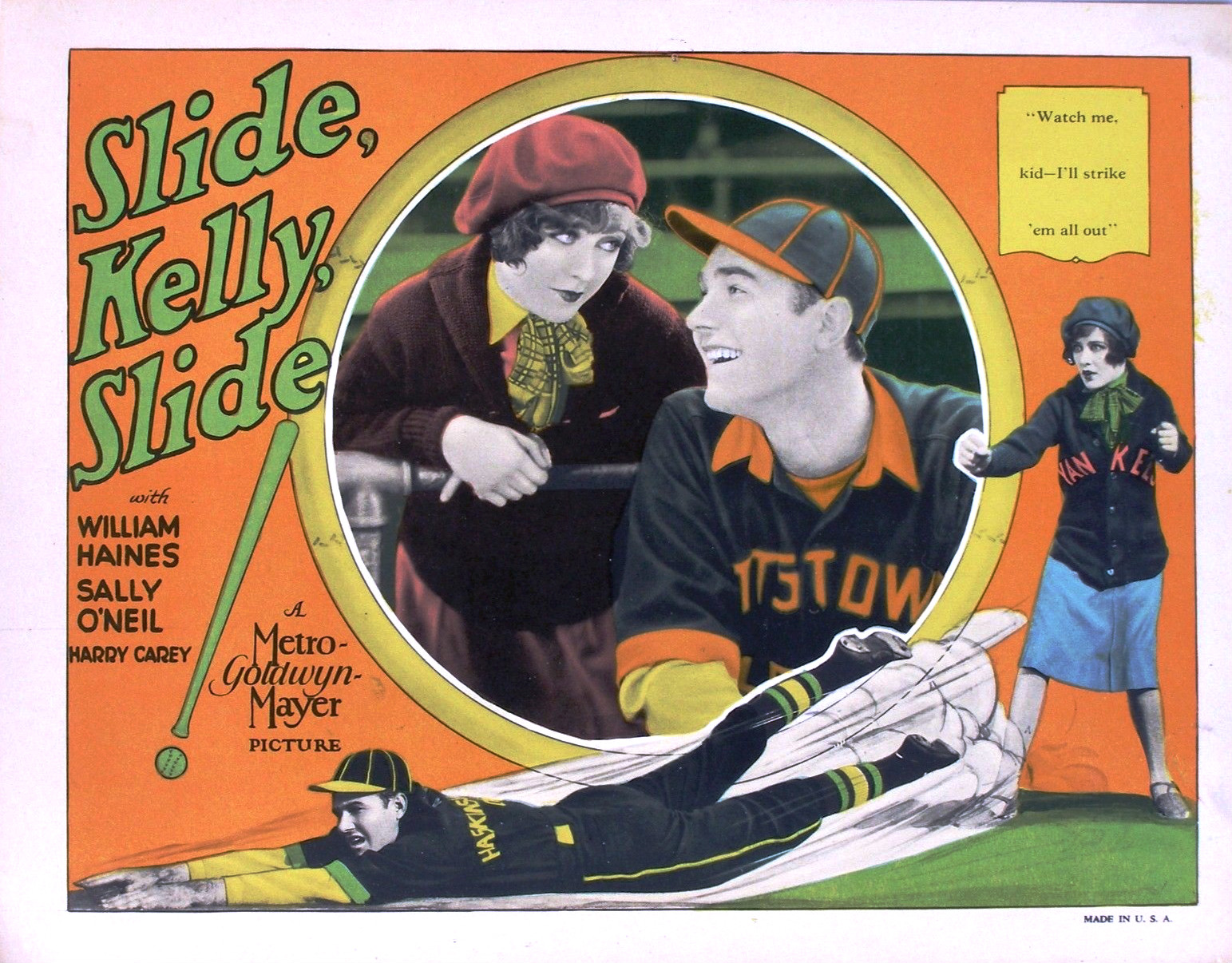
- Lobby card
- Directed by: Edward Sedgwick
- Written by: Joseph Farnham; A. P. Younger
- Starring: William Haines; Sally O'Neil; Harry Carey
- Cinematography: Henry Sharp
- Edited by: Frank Sullivan
- Distributed by: Metro-Goldwyn-Mayer
- Release date: March 12, 1927
- Running time: 80 minutes
- Country: United States
- Language: Silent (English intertitles)

Slide, Kelly, Slide is a 1927 American comedy film, released by Metro-Goldwyn-Mayer, directed by Edward Sedgwick, and starring William Haines, Sally O'Neil, and Harry Carey. A print exists.

== Cast ==
- William Haines as Jim Kelly (fictionalized version of Mike "King" Kelly)
- Sally O'Neil as Mary Munson
- Harry Carey as Tom Munson
- Frank Coghlan Jr. as Mickey Martin (as Junior Coghlan)
- Warner Richmond as CliffMacklin
- Paul Kelly as Fresbie
- Karl Dane as Swede Hansen
- Guinn "Big Boy" Williams as McLean (as Guinn Williams)
- Mike Donlin as himself
- Irish Meusel as himself
- Bob Meusel as himself
- Tony Lazzeri as himself
- Johnny Mack Brown as himself
- Lew Fonseca as himself (unconfirmed)

== Crew ==
- David Townsend – Set Designer

== See also ==
- Harry Carey filmography
- List of baseball films
