= The Ghost Patrol =

1923 silent film by Nat Ross

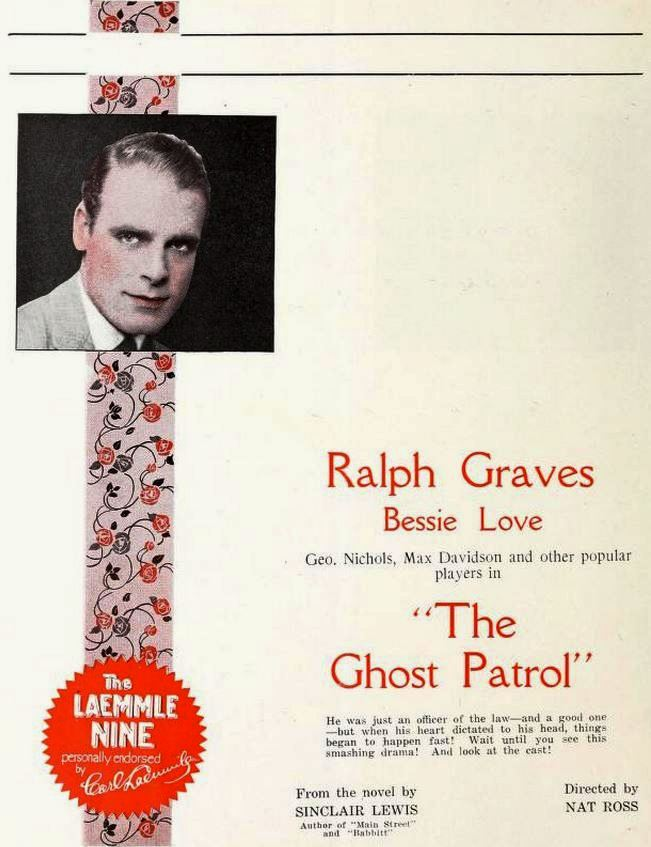
- Magazine advertisement
- Directed by: Nat Ross
- Written by: Raymond L. Schrock (scenario)
- Based on: "The Ghost Patrol" (story) by Sinclair Lewis
- Produced by: Carl Laemmle
- Starring: Ralph Graves; Bessie Love
- Cinematography: Ben F. Reynolds
- Production company: Universal Pictures
- Distributed by: Universal Pictures
- Release date: January 21, 1923 (U.S.)
- Running time: 5 reels; 4,228 feet
- Country: United States
- Language: Silent (English intertitles)

The Ghost Patrol is a 1923 American silent romantic melodrama film directed by Nat Ross from a short story by Sinclair Lewis, produced and distributed by Universal Pictures. It starred Ralph Graves and Bessie Love and is now considered lost.

The film is a member of the Universal-produced and Carl Laemmle-selected "The Laemmle Nine", which also includes A Dangerous Game, The Flaming Hour, Kindled Courage, The Scarlet Car, The Power of a Lie, The First Degree, The Love Letter, and The Gentleman from America.

== Plot ==
In the neighborhood of "Little Hell", Terry Rafferty, a reformed thief, has fallen in love with Effie Kugler and is seeking her hand in marriage. Effie's father refuses, which prompts Terry to get drunk and assault a politician. Terry is sent to prison.

Don Dorgan's 30-year career as a police officer ends when the new commissioner decides that he is too old. Don realizes that the neighborhood still needs him, and wears his old uniform, becoming "The Ghost Patrol".

After serving his sentence, Terry is released from prison, and Don brings him to Effie, reuniting the couple. When the commissioner learns of the good that Don has been bringing to the neighborhood, he rehires him and promotes him.

== Cast ==
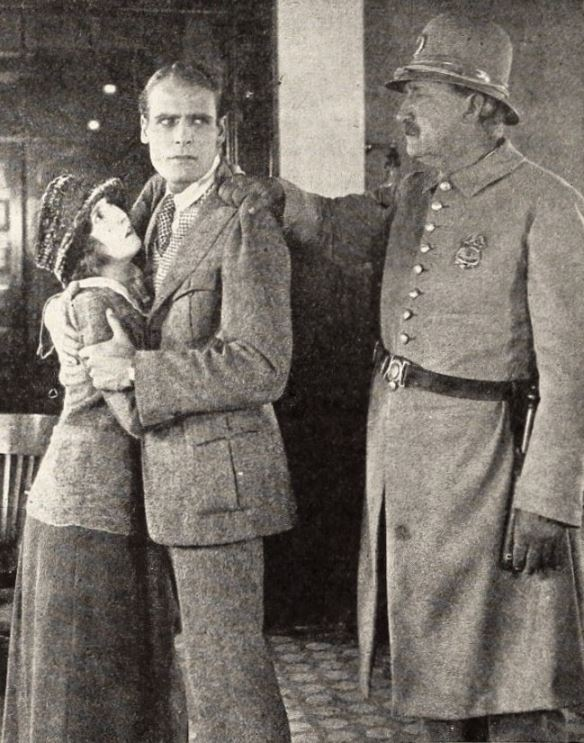
Effie (Love) and Terry (Graves) are interrupted by Don (Nichols)

- Ralph Graves as Terry Rafferty
- Bessie Love as Effie Kugler
- George Nichols as Donald "Don" Patrick Dorgan
- George B. Williams as Rudolph Kugler
- Max Davidson as Raspushkin
- Wade Boteler as Michael McManus
- Melbourne MacDowell as Commissioner Manning
- Lydia Yeamans Titus
- George Cooper
- Jack Carlyle
- Dan Crimmins
- Danny Hoy
- Gordon Sackville
- John Cossar
- Belle Johnson

== Production ==
Edith Roberts had originally been cast as the female lead.

== Release and reception ==
The film had its Los Angeles premiere at the Million Dollar Theater. Some theaters showed it with the short Dad's Boy, while others showed it the Baby Peggy short Sweetie.

Overall, the film received positive reviews. Bessie Love's performance was well-received, while Ralph Graves was deemed as miscast.
