= Captain Blood (1924 film) =

1924 film

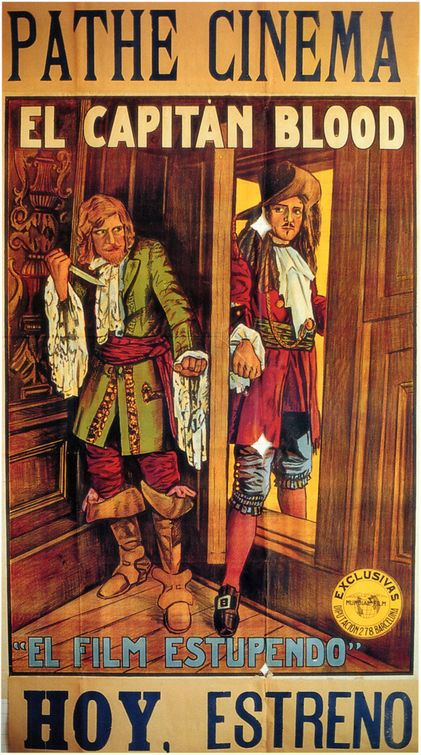
- Spanish-language poster
- Directed by: David Smith
- Written by: Jay Pilcher; C. Gardner Sullivan
- Based on: Captain Blood, His Odyssey; 1922 novel by Rafael Sabatini
- Produced by: Albert E. Smith
- Starring: J. Warren Kerrigan; Jean Paige
- Cinematography: Steve Smith Jr.
- Edited by: Albert Jordan
- Production company: Vitagraph Company of America
- Distributed by: Vitagraph Company of America
- Release date: September 21, 1924
- Running time: 110 minutes; 11 reels (10,680 feet)
- Country: United States
- Language: Silent (English intertitles)

An upload of the film

Captain Blood is a 1924 American silent adventure film based on the 1922 novel Captain Blood, His Odyssey by Rafael Sabatini. Produced and distributed by the Vitagraph Company of America, the film is directed by David Smith, brother of Vitagraph founder Albert E. Smith. Early silent film hero J. Warren Kerrigan stars along with resident Vitagraph leading actress Jean Paige, who was also married to Albert E. Smith.

== Cast ==
- J. Warren Kerrigan as Captain Peter Blood
- Jean Paige as Arabella Bishop
- Charlotte Merriam as Mary Traill
- James W. Morrison as Jeremy Pitt
- Allan Forrest as Lord Julian Wade
- Bertram Grassby as Don Diego
- Otis Harlan as Corliss
- Jack Curtis as Wolverstone
- Wilfrid North as Colonel Bishop
- Otto Matieson as Lord Jeffreys
- Robert Bolder as Admiral van der Kuylen
- Templar Saxe as Governor Steed
- Henry A. Barrows as Lord Willoughby
- Boyd Irwin as Levasseur
- Henry Hebert as Captain Hobart
- Miles McCarthy as Capt. Caverly
- Frank Whitson as Baron de Rivarol
- Helen Howard as Mistress Baynes
- Tom McGuire as Farmer Baynes
- Robert Milasch as Kent
- William Eugene as Don Esteban
- George B. Williams as Maj. Mallard
- Omar Whitehead as Don Miguel
- Muriel Paull as Mademoiselle d'Ogeron
- George J. Lewis as Henri d'Ogeron
- Julie Bishop as Little Girl

== Preservation status ==
A print restored by the Library of Congress was shown at the Pordenone Silent Film Festival in 2018.

== Remake ==
In 1925, Warner Brothers was on the verge of taking over the historic Vitagraph Company. When Warners decided to remake Captain Blood in 1935 with Errol Flynn, they would have owned the screen rights to the Sabatini novel which came as part of the Vitagraph buyout.
