= Two Women (1919 film) =

1919 film

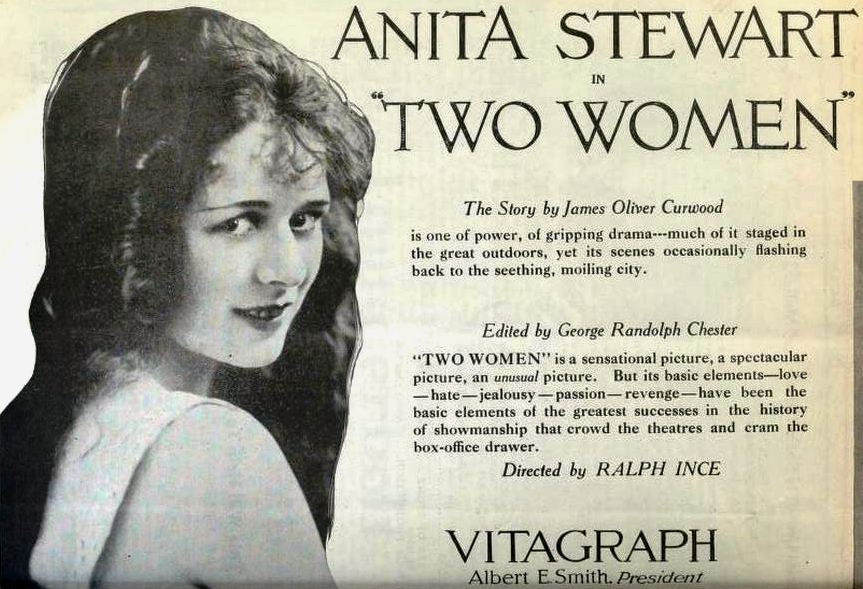
- Directed by: Ralph Ince
- Written by: James Oliver Curwood
- Produced by: Albert E. Smith
- Starring: Anita Stewart; Earle Williams; Julia Swayne Gordon
- Edited by: George Randolph Chester; Lillian Josephine Chester
- Production company: Vitagraph Company of America
- Distributed by: Vitagraph Company of America
- Release date: January 28, 1919
- Running time: 50 minutes
- Country: United States
- Languages: Silent; English intertitles

Two Women is a 1919 American silent drama film directed by Ralph Ince and starring Anita Stewart, Earle Williams and Julia Swayne Gordon.

== Cast ==
- Anita Stewart as Enid Arden
- Earle Williams as John Leighton
- Julia Swayne Gordon as Emily Leighton
- Harry Northrup as W.G. Griggs

== Preservation ==
With no holdings located in archives, Two Women is considered a lost film.

== Bibliography ==
- Connelly, Robert B. The Silents: Silent Feature Films, 1910-36, Volume 40, Issue 2. December Press, 1998.
