= Till We Meet Again (1922 film) =

1922 film directed by Christy Cabanne

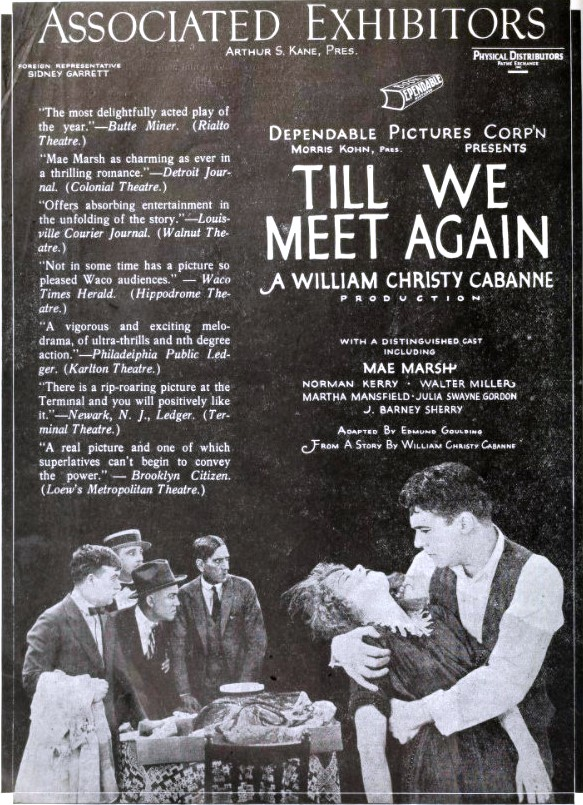
- Trade advertisement
- Directed by: Christy Cabanne
- Written by: Edmund Goulding; Christy Cabanne
- Starring: Julia Swayne Gordon; Mae Marsh; J. Barney Sherry
- Cinematography: William Tuers; Philip Armond
- Production company: Dependable Pictures
- Distributed by: Associated Exhibitors
- Release date: October 15, 1922 (US)
- Running time: 6 reels
- Country: United States
- Language: Silent (English intertitles)

Till We Meet Again is a lost 1922 American silent melodrama film directed by Christy Cabanne and starring Julia Swayne Gordon, Mae Marsh, and J. Barney Sherry. It was released on October 15, 1922.

== Cast list ==
- Julia Swayne Gordon as Mrs. Whitney Carter
- Mae Marsh as Marion Bates
- J. Barney Sherry as Arthur Montrose
- Walter Miller as Jim Brennan
- Norman Kerry as Robert Carter
- Martha Mansfield as Henrietta Carter
- Tammany Young as Sam McGuire
- Danny Hayes as Pete Morrison
- Dick Lee as Clarence De Vere
- Cyril Chadwick as One of the gang

== Preservation ==
With no holdings located in archives, Till We Meet Again is considered a lost film.
