= Arthur Edwin Krows =

American screenwriter (1892–1958)

Arthur Edwin Krows (1892–1958) was screenwriter, journalist, editor, author, and film director in the United States. He wrote a book on producing plays and articles about educational films. He illustrated one of his books.

He was born in New York City to Edwin Krows, a sales manager, and Lavinia Myers Krows. He married Marion Soeloman of Yonkers in 1914. His second wife was Catherine Peterka. He had a son.

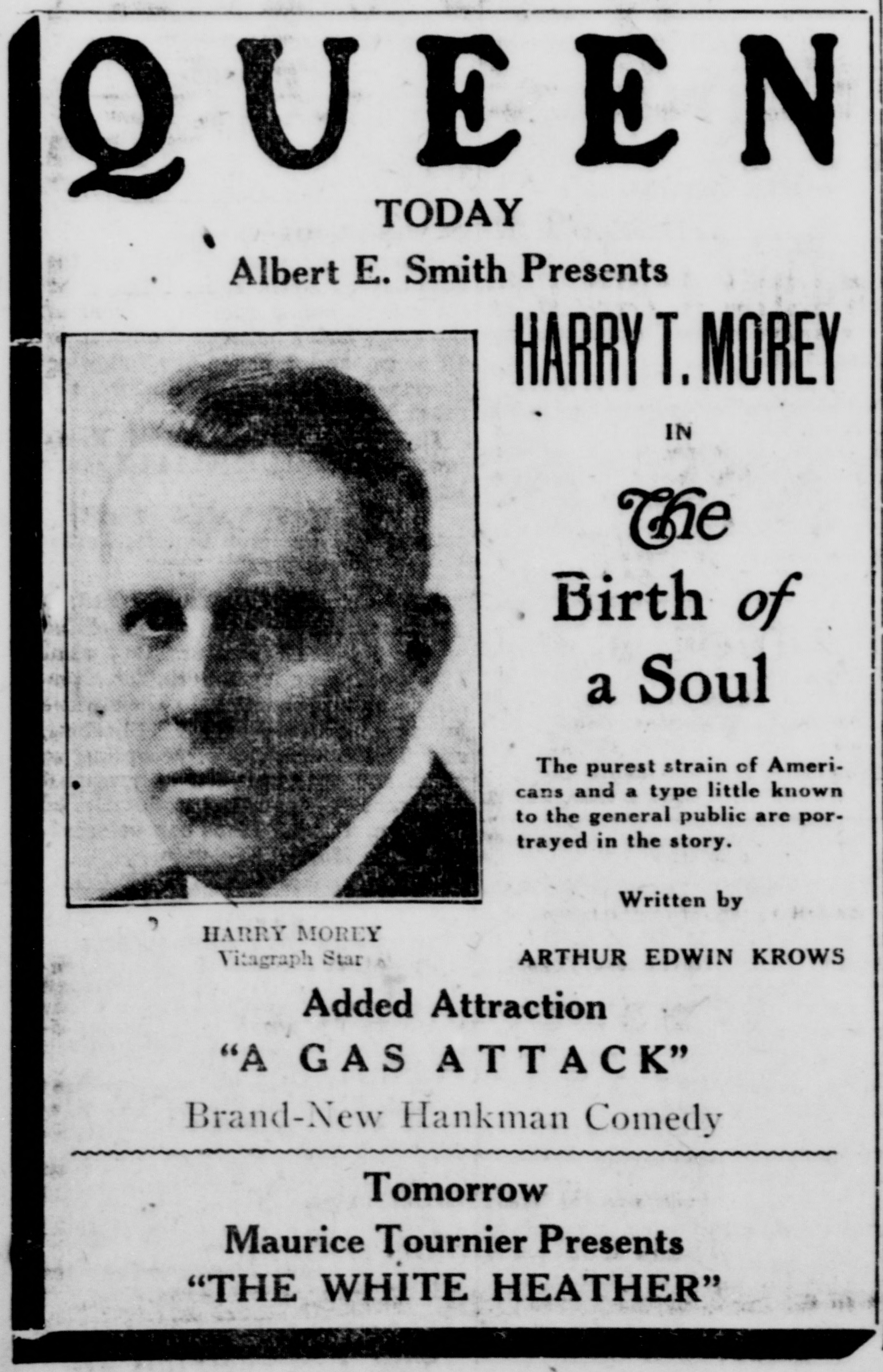
Advertisement for The Birth of a Soul

He directed films about social service. He edited several magazines. In 1927 made films surveying industrial museums in Europe with Charles T Gwynne, trustee of the planned Museum of Peaceful Arts in New York City (later renamed New York Museum of Science and Industry) as well as a leader of New York City's chamber of commerce, and cameraman Walter T. Pritchard. There were plans to build an industrial museum in New York City at the time. He wrote plays.

He wrote an article titled "Literature and the Motion Picture". He also wrote an article titled "Motion Pictures - Not for Theaters" for Educational Screen magazine. The article “Sound and Speech in Silent Pictures” (JSMPE, April 1931 pages 427–436) is a reprint of a chapter of his book.

His 1930 book The Talkies is included on the Library of Congress' bibliography of wax cylinder audio recordings. He worked for the Office of War Information during World War II.

He wrote that in order to appeal to the broadest possible audience, film businesses made films that could be enjoyed by people of lesser intellect.

He spoke on radio station WAAT. Theodore Roosevelt wrote back to him thanking him for his courtesy but noting Roosevelt could not attend the event to which he was invited.

He died in Yonkers aged 65.

== Writings ==
- Play Production in America (1916)
- Playwriting for Profit (1928)
- Equipment for stage production; a manual of scene building D. Appleton & Company (1928), illustrations by Krows
- The Talkies (1930) Henry Holt And Company, New York

=== Plays ===
- A Word in Private

== Filmography ==
- The Winchester Woman (1919)
- The Birth of a Soul (1920)
- Christopher Columbus (1923), part of the Chronicles of America series produced by Yale University Press
- Museums of the New Age (1927), full title Museums of the New Age: A Study of World Progress in Industrial Education, a rediscovered film for which a score was written
