= Hit and Run (1924 film) =

1924 film directed by Edward Sedgwick

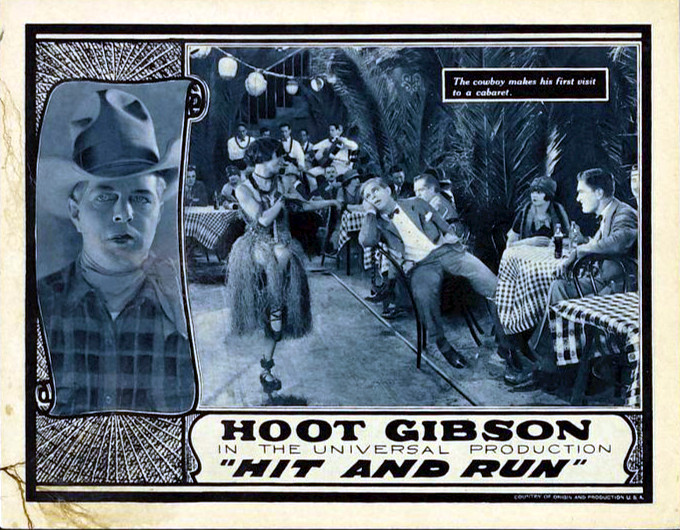
- Lobby card
- Directed by: Edward Sedgwick
- Written by: Edward Sedgwick; Raymond L. Schrock
- Based on: a story by Edward Sedgwick and Raymond L. Schrock
- Produced by: Carl Laemmle
- Cinematography: Virgil Miller
- Distributed by: Universal Pictures
- Release date: August 10, 1924
- Running time: 6 reels
- Country: United States
- Language: Silent (English intertitles)

Hit and Run is a 1924 silent American comedy drama film directed by Edward Sedgwick and starring western star Hoot Gibson as a member of a baseball team. It was produced and distributed by Universal Pictures.

== Plot ==
As described in a film magazine, they called him "Swat" Anderson (Gibson) where the cactus made life tough for outfielders and where the man who caught Swat's hits rode a bucking bronco. "Red" McCarthy (Donlin), a baseball scout for Joe Burn's (Jennings) club, got sore at Burns while riding on a transcontinental limited and jumped of at a watering hole with his daughter, Joan (Harlan). Nothing there but the water tank and God's scenery — until a bunch of cowboys gathered in the limitless desert and started to play baseball. Then "Red" McCarthy got the surprise of his big league life — he saw an untrained cowboy hit a ball so hard that it took a man on a horse to find it after a hard ride. McCarthy, true to type, signed the prodigy up on the spot, and Swat was off to another world. He was taken to Burns at the Southern training quarters. There he was laughed at and ridiculed for his inability to catch a ball, until he picked up a bat. The minute wood touched horse-hide he was the idol of the club. But George Collins (Ring), secretary of the club, saw no good in him, because the newcomer attracted Joan McCarthy, with whom Collins liked to think of himself as the best attraction. Consequently, he made life miserable for the green wonder, and when the big game was about to come off, with Swat as the mainstay of the club, Collins laid his plans carefully to put Swat out of commission, thus ruining Swat's chances with the girl and at the same time helping his own chances a little by some side betting on the game. But the best laid plans of mice and men gang aft astray, and the ninth inning of the great game finds a surprise for both sides and much of it has to do with the lady in the case.

== Cast ==
- Hoot Gibson as "Swat" Anderson
- Marion Harlan as Joan McCarthy
- Cyril Ring as George Collins
- Harold Goodwin as Tex Adams
- De Witt Jennings as Joe Burns
- Mike Donlin as Red McCarthy
- William A. Steele as The Gopher
- Hank Bell as Cafe Customer (uncredited)
- Wade Boteler as Gambler (uncredited)
- Frank Hagney as Tough Guy (uncredited)
- LeRoy Mason as Spectator (uncredited)
- Arthur Millett as Detective (uncredited)

== Preservation status ==
A print of Hit and Run is preserved in the George Eastman Museum.

== See also ==
- Hoot Gibson filmography
