= Jean Paige =

American actress (1895–1990)

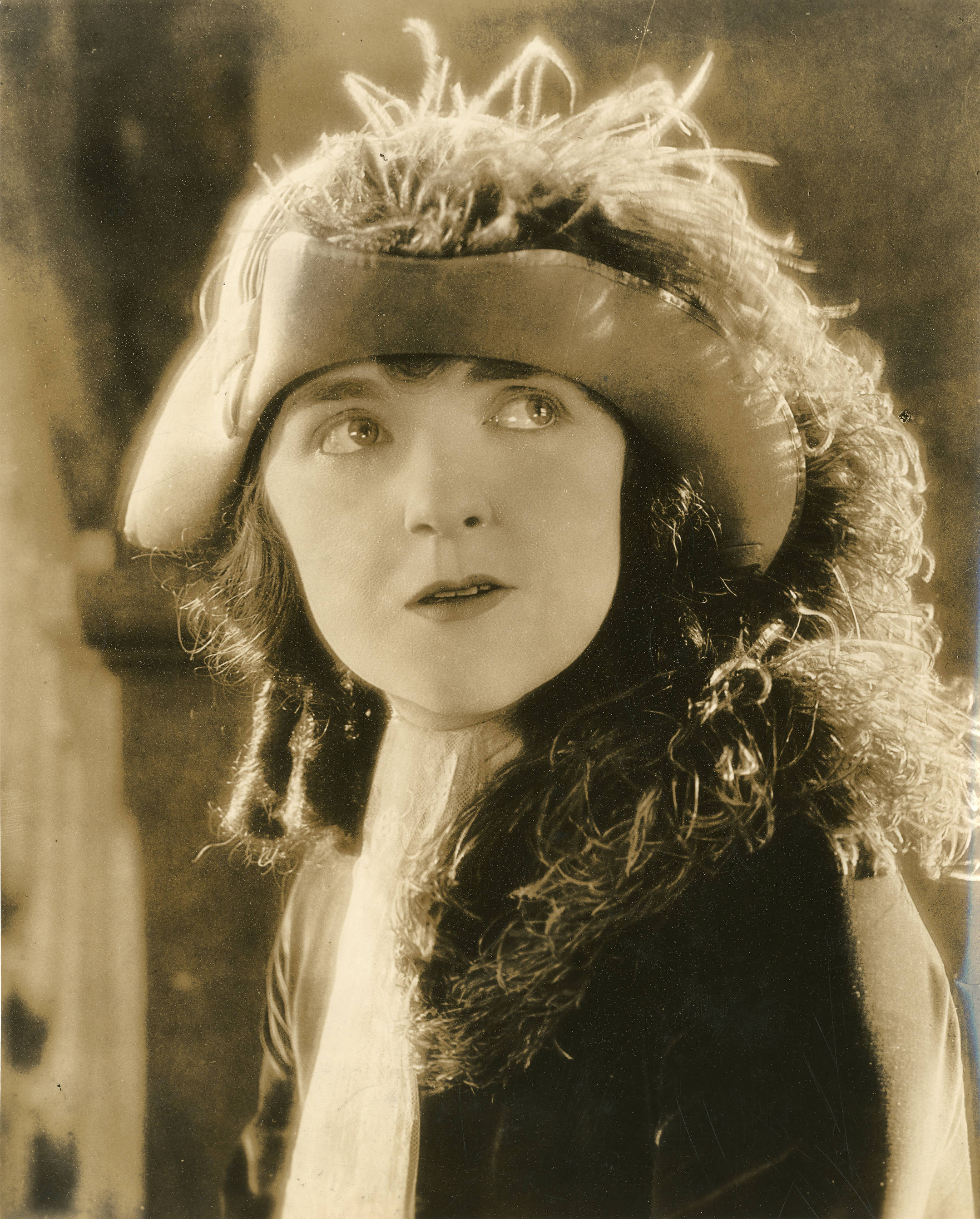
- Paige in 1924
- Born: Lucille Beatrice O'Hair; July 3, 1895; Paris, Illinois, U.S.
- Died: December 15, 1990 (aged 95); Los Angeles, California, U.S.
- Occupation: Actress
- Years active: 1917–1924
- Spouse: Albert E. Smith (m. 1920; died 1958)

Jean Paige (born Lucille Beatrice O'Hair, July 3, 1895 – December 15, 1990) was an American film actress of the silent era.

== Early years ==
Although Paige's mother wanted her to become a missionary, her father prevented her from doing so. Paige developed acting skills through private lessons and classes at Kings School of Oratory, Elocution and Dramatic Culture in Pittsburg. On July 25, 1917, she traveled to New York with an aunt to take a Vitagraph screen test that had been set up by a family friend. She performed well enough to be cast in two-reel O.Henry features.

== Career ==
Paige made 21 films in a career that began in 1917 and concluded in 1924. Her films include Blind Man's Holiday (1917), The Darkest Hour (1919), The Birth of a Soul (1920), Black Beauty (1921), The Prodigal Judge (1922), Captain Blood (1924), and Daring Hearts (1919). She came to prominence in the Vitagraph film Too Many Crooks (1919). As Charlotte Brown, she made a star part out of a bit part. Paige never appeared on stage and had no experience in movies prior to becoming a Vitagraph leading woman. Her role in Too Many Crooks led Vitagraph president Albert E. Smith to elevate her position at the film studio. She married Smith in December 1920.

== Death ==
She died in Los Angeles, California in 1990.

== Selected filmography ==
- The Count and the Wedding Guest (1918)
- Schools and Schools (1918)
- Tangled Lives (1918)
- Hoarded Assets (1918)
- The Golden Goal (1918)
- The Fortune Hunter (1920)
- The Birth of a Soul (1920)
- Black Beauty (1921)
- The Prodigal Judge (1922)
