= Vaughan Kester =

American journalist

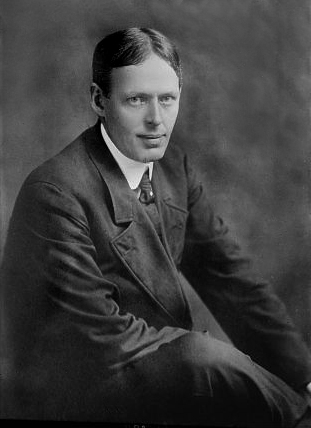
- Kester, ca. 1900
- Born: September 12, 1869; New Brunswick, New Jersey
- Died: July 4, 1911 (aged 41); Gunston Hall, Fairfax County, Virginia
- Occupation: Novelist
- Spouse: Jessie Jennings Kester
- Parent(s): Franklin Cooley Kester and Harriet Watkins Kester (cofounder of Cleveland School of Art, died 1926)

Vaughan or Vaughn Kester (September 12, 1869 – July 4, 1911) was an American novelist and journalist.

He was the elder brother of dramatist and author Paul Kester (1870–1933).

His style and topics were influenced by his travels through western and southern U.S., and by his mother's cousin William Dean Howells. His novel The Manager of the B & A was made into a film in 1916 directed by J.P. McGowan, with Leo Maloney and Helen Holmes, reissued in 1921 as The Man from Medicine Hat. He married Jessie B. Jennings from Mount Vernon, Ohio on August 31, 1898. They had no children.

In 1902, with his brother, he purchased and renovated Woodlawn Plantation. From 1907, he lived at Gunston Hall, where he wrote The Prodigal Judge, and where he died. A memorial in his honor was placed by his mother in Pohick Church, which had at one time been the parish church of Gunston Hall.

== Published works ==
- The Manager of the B & A (1901)
- The Fortunes of the Landrays (1905)
- John 0' Jamestown (1907)
- The Prodigal Judge (1911) (second best-selling book in the United States for 1911)
- The Just and the Unjust (1912) (seventh best-selling book in the United States for 1912)
- The Hand of the Mighty (published 1913)
- The Cousin of the King (play, with his brother Paul)
