= Chasing the Moon (1922 film) =

1922 film by Edward Sedgwick

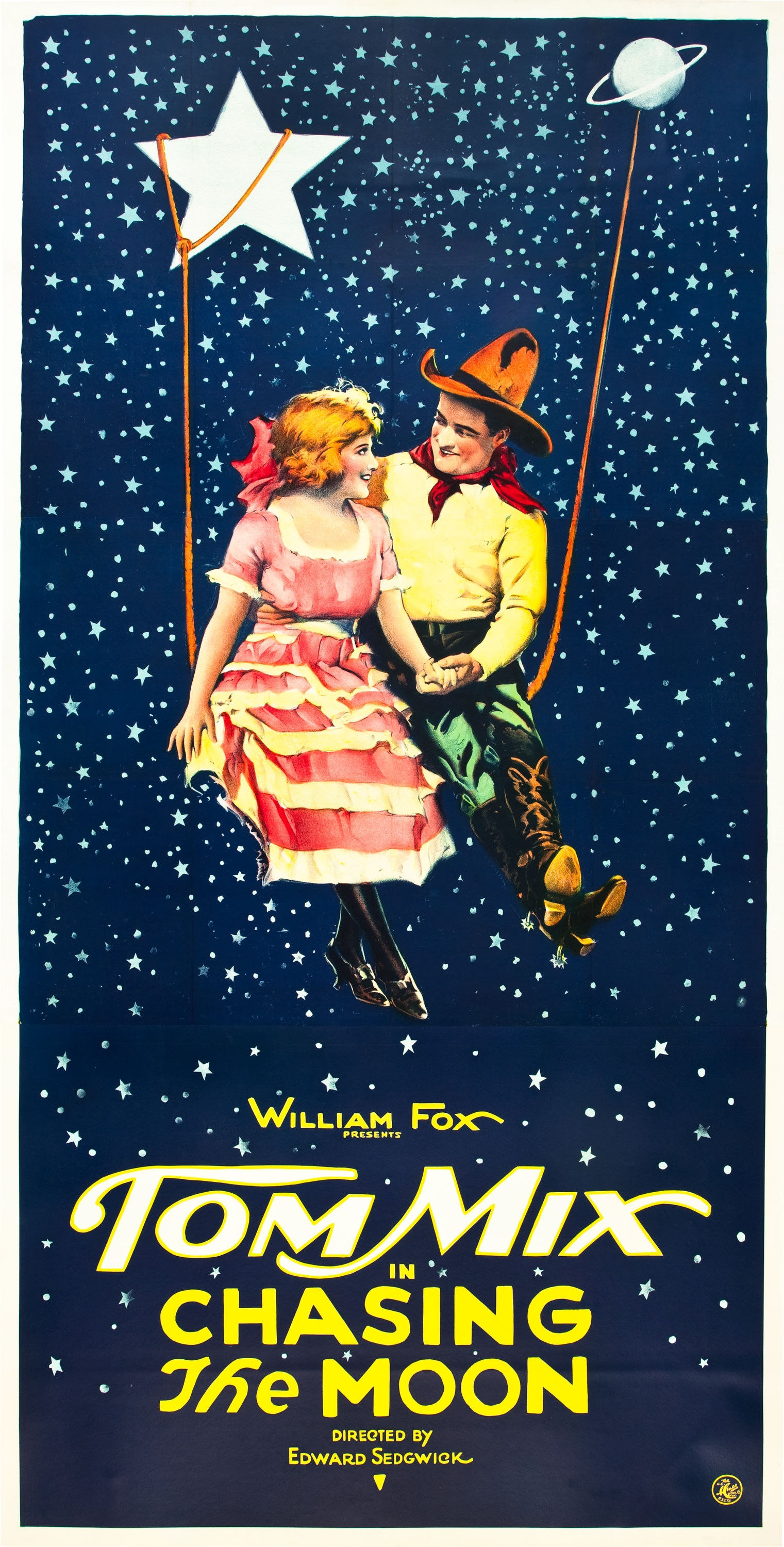
- Poster
- Directed by: Edward Sedgwick
- Written by: Edward Sedgwick
- Story by: Tom Mix
- Produced by: William Fox
- Starring: Tom Mix; Eva Novak
- Cinematography: Benjamin H. Kline
- Edited by: Ralph Spence
- Distributed by: Fox Film Corporation
- Release date: February 26, 1922
- Running time: 5 reels
- Country: United States
- Language: Silent (English intertitles)

Chasing the Moon is a lost 1922 American silent drama film directed by Edward Sedgwick and starring Tom Mix. It was produced and released by the Fox Film Corporation.

== Plot ==
As described in a film magazine, Dwight Locke (Mix), the sweetheart of Jane Norworth (Novak), is a pampered son of wealth with so many automobiles, houses, and clothes that he does not know what to do with himself. His hand is accidentally scratched and becomes infected with a deadly poison invented by Milton Norworth (Buckley), who is Jane's brother. A professor with the only antidote for the poison is en route to Russia, so Dwight rushes to intercept him. An attempt is made to kidnap Dwight and hold him for ransom, but he escapes by jumping off a moving train and unmounting a Russian on a passing horse and riding away. In the meantime Jane learns that the poison was in fact harmless, but that the antidote if taken would kill him. She goes to Russia and then follows him to Spain as Dwight attempts to catch up with the professor. When he reaches the professor, Dwight finds him too deaf to understand him. Jane arrives in time to stop Dwight from taking the antidote.

== Cast ==
- Tom Mix as Dwight Locke
- Eva Novak as Jane Norworth
- William Buckley as Milton Norworth
- Sid Jordan as Velvet Joe
- Elsie Danbric as Princess Sonia
- Wynn Mace as Prince Albert

== Production ==
A film magazine stated that several of the action scenes involving Dwight Locke in Chasing the Moon were from other Tom Mix films, including at least one scene lifted from Sky High (1922).
