= The Scarlet Car (1923 film) =

1923 film by Stuart Paton

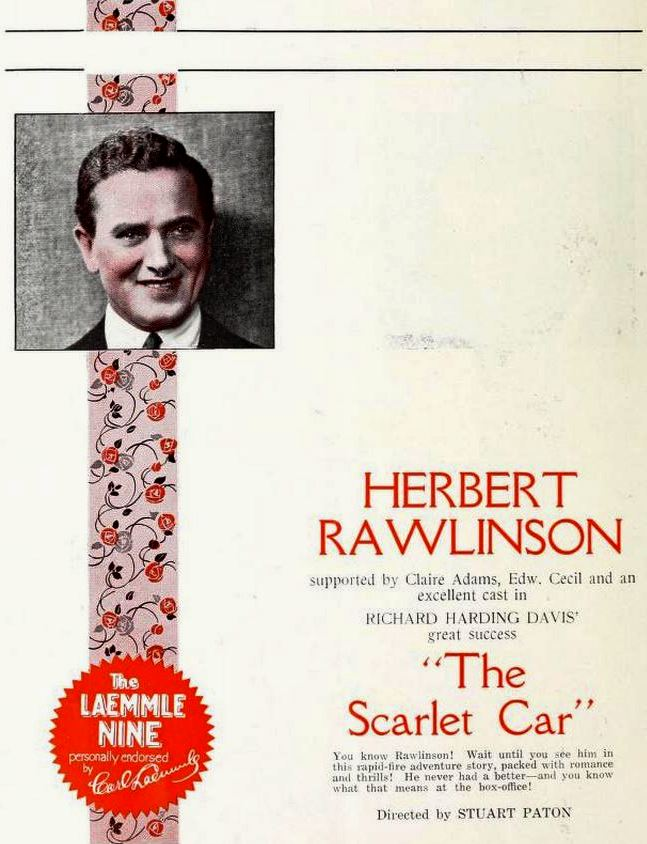
- Trade advertisement
- Directed by: Stuart Paton
- Written by: George Randolph Chester
- Based on: "Adventures of the Scarlet Car" by Richard Harding Davis
- Produced by: Carl Laemmle
- Starring: Herbert Rawlinson; Claire Adams; Edward Cecil
- Cinematography: Virgil Miller
- Production company: Universal Pictures
- Distributed by: Universal Pictures
- Release date: January 15, 1923
- Running time: 5 reels
- Country: United States
- Language: Silent (English intertitles)

The Scarlet Car is a lost 1923 American silent drama film directed by Stuart Paton and starring Herbert Rawlinson, Claire Adams, and Edward Cecil. It is based on a novel by Richard Harding Davis, which had previously been turned into a 1917 Lon Chaney film of the same title.

The film is a member of the Universal-produced and Carl Laemmle-selected "The Laemmle Nine", which also includes A Dangerous Game, The Flaming Hour, The Ghost Patrol, Kindled Courage, The Power of a Lie, The First Degree, The Love Letter, and The Gentleman From America.

== Plot ==
As described in a film magazine, Billy (Rawlinson) is fired after being arrested for speeding thirty times in thirty days, and is shipped home to his father Jim Winthrop (Tom McGuire). His father has backed Ernest Peabody (Cecil) for mayor. Ernest has betrayed Violet Gaynor (Johnson), Jim's secretary. Beatrice Forbes (Adams), whom Billy likes and would like Billy if she only knew it, has fallen for Ernest's grandiloquent line of bunk and promised to marry him. Violet has learned that Ernest has double-crossed Jim in politics about the time her father Jerry Gaynor (Robbins) has discovered her condition (pregnancy) and, believing Billy guilty of being the father, attempts to blackmail him and "queers" his relationship with Beatrice. Mitt Deagon (O'Brien), who loves Violet, also discovers her secret and attempts to expose Ernest, but is prevented by Billy, who is completely unaware of the facts. While campaigning, Ernest's car strikes Violet's father and, believing the man is dead, Ernest flees in a cowardly fashion. The election of Ernest Peabody seems certain and he announces his engagement to Beatrice. When Violet reads this, she does what any woman betrayed in love would do, and in a climax of fast events clears up the triangle. When Billy understands the character of Ernest, he decides to see to it that Ernest is neither elected mayor nor married to Beatrice.

== Cast ==
- Herbert Rawlinson as Billy Winthrop
- Claire Adams as Beatrice Forbes
- Edward Cecil as Ernest Peabody
- Norris Johnson as Violet Gaynor
- Tom McGuire as Jim Winthrop
- Marc B. Robbins as Jerry Gaynor
- Tom O'Brien as Mitt Deagon

== Bibliography ==
- Palmer, Scott. British Film Actors' Credits, 1895 - 1987. McFarland, 1988.
