= The Scarlet Car (1917 film) =

1917 film

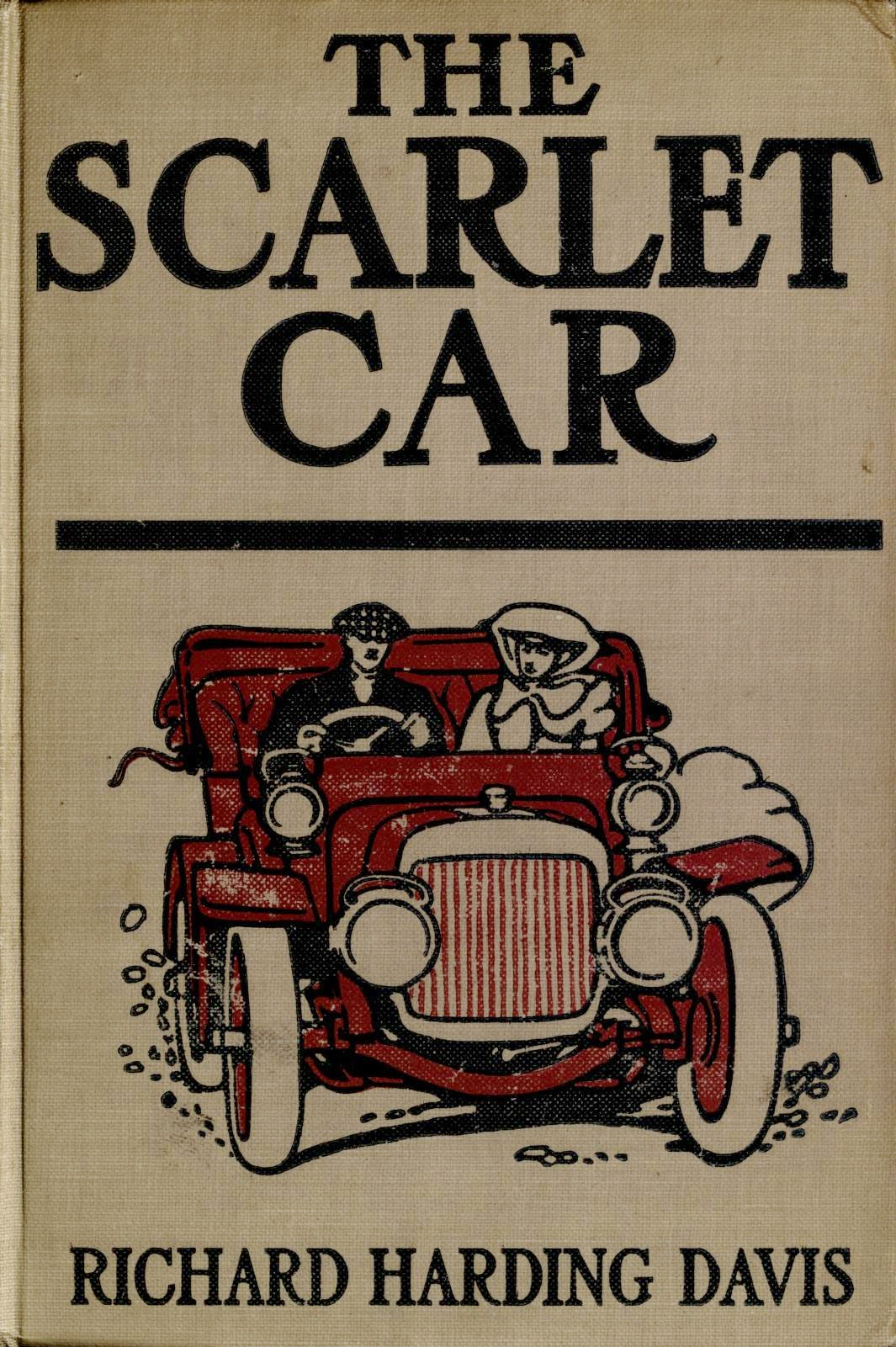
- The novel The Scarlet Car (1907) upon which the film was based
- Directed by: Joe De Grasse
- Written by: William Parker
- Based on: The Scarlet Car by Richard Harding Davis
- Produced by: Bluebird Photoplays
- Starring: Lon Chaney; Franklyn Farnum
- Cinematography: King D. Gray
- Distributed by: Universal Pictures
- Release date: December 24, 1917
- Running time: 50 minutes
- Country: United States
- Language: Silent (English intertitles)

The Scarlet Car is a 1917 American silent drama film directed by Joe De Grasse and featuring Lon Chaney, Edith Johnson, and Franklyn Farnum. The film was written by William Parker, based upon the novel The Scarlet Car by Richard Harding Davis, which also served as the basis of a 1923 Universal film of the same name. A print of the 1917 film exists at the Library of Congress, and the movie is available on DVD. Clips from the film were used in the 1995 documentary Lon Chaney: Behind the Mask. A still exists showing Lon Chaney in his own make-up as the protagonist "Paul Revere Forbes".

Like many American films of the time, The Scarlet Car was subject to cuts by city and state film censorship boards. The Chicago Board of Censors required a cut of slugging the man, the shortening of the fight scene in the lobby, and to flash the mob scene at the beginning of a reel.

== Plot ==
The film

Paul Revere Forbes, a descendant of the original Paul Revere, is a teller at Cyrus Peabody's bank. He discovers that Cyrus and his son, Ernest, have embezzled $35,000 of the bank's money, and lost the entire sum on a bad investment. When Forbes threatens to expose them, Peabody knocks him unconscious and, thinking he is dead, Henry Davidson, a third party to the crime, takes Forbes' body for a ride in his scarlet car. Forbes' daughter Beatrice is taken in by Ernest Peabody who is engaged to marry her.

Billy Winthrop, a young wastrel, is once again bailed out of jail by his father Samuel. Having spent the money on his son's bail, Samuel Winthrop no longer has the money for his payment to Peabody's bank. Billy decides to make good on some of his fathers debts by collecting from his dad's old debtors, and in a short time, Billy has his father's business running better than ever.

Soon after, the scarlet car is found wrecked out in the countryside with Henry Davidson's corpse in it. Billy convinces Beatrice to leave Ernest Peabody and marry him instead. They elope in a pouring rainstorm, but Ernest follows them out into the country and a fight ensues. Beatrice wanders off in the rain where she comes across an old cabin. She is shocked to find her father is still alive and living in the cabin, but his mind has snapped and he thinks he is actually Paul Revere. Forbes relates that Davidson wrecked the car as he was en route to dispose of Forbe's body that afternoon, and Forbes left the accident scene in a daze and wandered off to the old cabin. Forbes still has a page torn from the bank's ledger which would convict Peabody and his son, but in his confused state of mind, Forbes refuses to surrender it to either his daughter or to Billy. (He claims he will only surrender it to General George Washington himself.)

Meanwhile, Ernest has told the townspeople that Billy has abducted Beatrice and they all head out in a mob to tar and feather him. Meanwhile, Beatrice searches for a doctor to help her father. Just as Billy is captured by the mob, a man rides by and Beatrice asks him to approach Forbes and say to him "The general wants the important document." Forbes, thinking the British are attacking, hands over the hidden ledger page and the townspeople tar and feather Mr. Peabody and his son instead. Forbes' mind begins to return to normal, and Billy and Beatrice are married.

== Cast ==
- Franklyn Farnum as Billy Winthrop
- Edith Johnson as Beatrice Forbes
- Lon Chaney as Paul Revere Forbes
- Sam De Grasse as Ernest Peabody
- Al W. Filson as Samuel Winthrop
- Howard Crampton as Cyrus Peabody
- William Lloyd as Jim Pettit
- Allan Cavan as Mob member (uncredited)
- Jack Filson as Phil Hastings (uncredited)
- Nelson McDowell as Townsman (uncredited)
- Lon Poff as Constable (uncredited)
- Harry Tenbrook as Scrapper (uncredited)
- William J. Humphrey as Member of Directors Meeting (uncredited)
- Lule Warrenton as Mrs. Peabody (uncredited)

== Reception ==
"THE SCARLET CAR presents a melodrama of considerable interest. The various incidents which lead up to the accusation of Billy with the stealing of the bank funds present an unusual array of complications calculated to rouse the interest at the start and maintain it to an admirable degree throughout the five reels. The manner in which Billy clears himself is unusual and leads up to a climax of the true melodramatic type." ---Motion Picture News

"There is a flavor of novelty in the situations and patrons cannot complain that it is just like others they have seen...Al Filson, Howard Crampton and Lon Chaney play their roles skillfully." ---Motography

"Lon Chaney makes a strong character study of the cashier." ---Moving Picture World

"A tiresome feature, made especially so through the ravings of the demented cashier (Chaney)." ---Variety
