= New Adventures of Get Rich Quick Wallingford =

1931 film

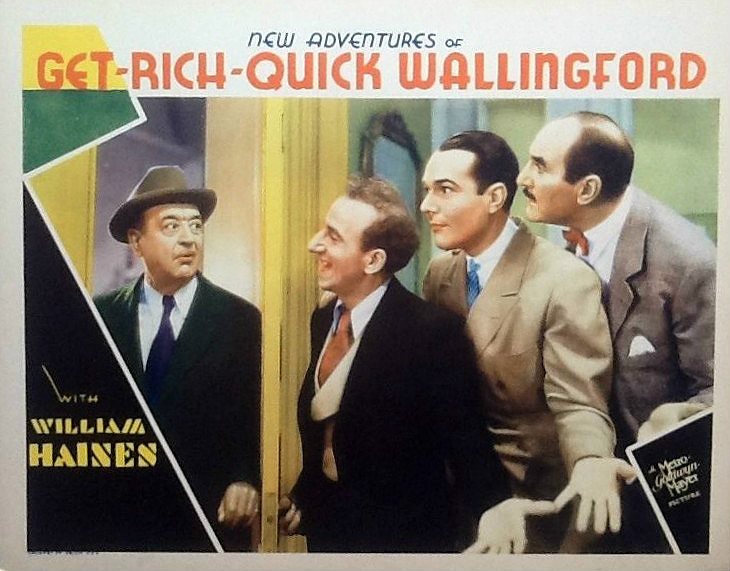
- Lobby card
- Directed by: Sam Wood
- Written by: Charles MacArthur (adaptation)
- Based on: "The Wallingford Stories" by George Randolph Chester
- Produced by: Harry Rapf
- Starring: William Haines; Jimmy Durante
- Cinematography: Oliver T. Marsh
- Edited by: Frank Sullivan
- Production company: Metro-Goldwyn-Mayer
- Distributed by: Metro-Goldwyn-Mayer
- Release date: October 3, 1931
- Running time: 87-96 minutes
- Country: United States
- Language: English

New Adventures of Get Rich Quick Wallingford is a 1931 American pre-Code crime / romantic comedy film directed by Sam Wood and starring William Haines as a con artist and Jimmy Durante as his pickpocket buddy. The film is based on a series of stories by George Randolph Chester published in Cosmopolitan.

== Cast ==
- William Haines as Jimmy Wallingford
- Jimmy Durante as Clarence 'Schnozzle'
- Ernest Torrence as Blackie Daw
- Leila Hyams as Dorothy Layton
- Guy Kibbee as Police Sergeant McGonigal
- Hale Hamilton as Charles Harper
- Robert McWade as Horace Tuttle
- Clara Blandick as Mrs Maggie Layton
- Walter Walker as Frank Layton
- Alfred Allen as Ship's Captain (uncredited)
- Henry Armetta as Henry, a Barber (uncredited)
- Lucy Beaumont as Mrs. Dalrymple, a Cleaning Lady (uncredited)
- Robert Bolder as Minor Role (uncredited)
- Sidney Bracey as Joe the Waiter (uncredited)
- Allan Cavan as Hotel Cashier (uncredited)
- Sydney Jarvis as Chief of Police Morgan (uncredited)
- Tom Kennedy as Truck Driver (uncredited)
- Edwin Maxwell as Adam Carver the Hotel Manager (uncredited)
- Charles R. Moore as Bootblack (uncredited)
- William H. O'Brien as Private Dining Room Waiter (uncredited)
- Joe Sawyer as Willis the Newspaper Reporter (uncredited)
- Rolfe Sedan as Barber (uncredited)
- Phillips Smalley as Stockholder (uncredited)

== Reception ==
Mordaunt Hall wrote in The New York Times that "the film affords many a good laugh and most of the ideas are developed quite neatly" and that Haines' performance was "emphatically satisfactory."
