= Lillian Josephine Chester =

American writer and filmmaker

Lillian Chester
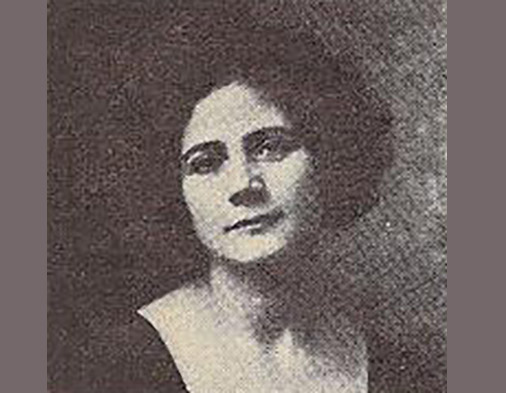
- Lillian Chester
- Born: Lillian Josephine Hauser; 29 September 1887; Cincinnati, Ohio, U.S.
- Died: 7 June 1961; Pinellas, Florida, U.S.
- Years active: 1914–1924
- Spouse: George Randolph Chester (m.1911–1924; his death)

Lillian Josephine Chester (September 29, 1887 – June 7, 1961) was an American writer and filmmaker. Chester wrote under many different variations of her name including Lillian Randolph Chester, Mrs. George Randolph Chester, and Lillian Chester. She published her first book in 1914. The Ball of Fire was a co-authored book with her husband. She worked alone and alongside her husband, George Randolph Chester, from 1914 until his death in 1924. She wrote hundreds of short stories and numerous stage plays.

== Personal life ==
Lillian Chester was born in Cincinnati where she also met her husband, George. When Lillian Chester met George, she was a widow going by the name Lillian Josephine Hauser DeRimo. George was still married to his wife Elizabeth Chester. Elizabeth, Lillian, and George moved to New York around the same time. Elizabeth divorced George in 1911, using the evidence that he was living at Gainsborough Studios in London with Lillian. Elizabeth filed for divorce and George and Lillian married while they were in Europe after hearing that the divorce was finalized. However, Elizabeth had only been granted an interlocutory decree, which made the divorce not final and therefore made his subsequent marriage to Lillian controversial.

A friend of Elizabeth quotes George as saying "You [Elizabeth] are perfect in every respect, except one. This woman [Lillian] surpasses you in beauty. I must have that. My nature demands it - my soul cries out for it." George and Lillian delayed their return to New York after finding out about the failed divorce. George briefly ran away, fearing charges of bigamy. However, on December 2, 1911, Justice Guy finalized the divorce between Elizabeth and George. Lillian and Elizabeth were friends before the divorce proceedings, despite the ten year age gap. George had two sons, Robert F. and George R. Jr., from his marriage with Elizabeth. Elizabeth was granted custody of both children. Lillian and George did not have any children. Upon George's death, he left everything he owned to Lillian. George Chester died of a heart attack on 26 February 1924 in New York City. After George's death, Lillian retired after the death of her husband. She died at the age of 71 in Pinellas, Florida on June 7, 1961. She is buried in Cincinnati next to her husband, George.

== Filmography ==
Lillian worked on most of her projects with her husband, George Chester. Lillian both wrote and edited stories and movies. She wrote hundreds of short stories and many stage plays. Lillian and George only directed one motion picture: The Son of Wallingford (1921). This film has been lost; however, reviews from when it came out indicate that it was about a con man. After the film came out one critic said, "Mr. Chester is an author, not a director. He furnishes excellent material, but he does not know how to project it onto the screen." Though Lillian is credited with the motion picture, she is mentioned in none of the reviews. Among the pieces she worked on were:

- The Wreck (1913)
- Runaway June (1915)
- The Enemy (1916)
- The Message of the Mouse (1917)
- Clover's Rebellion (1917)
- The Wild Strain (1918)
- Shadows of the Past (1919)
- The Painted World (1919)
- The Vengeance of Durand (1919)
- Two Women (1919)
- The Tower of Jewels (1920)
- Slaves of Pride (1920)
- The Birth of a Soul (1920)
- Trumpet Island (1920)
- Dead Men Tell No Tales (1920)
- Black Beauty (1921) *Incomplete, three reels missing
- The Son of Wallingford (1921)
- The Flaming Hour (1922)
- Scarlet Car (1923)
