= Get-Rich-Quick Wallingford (1921 film) =

1921 film

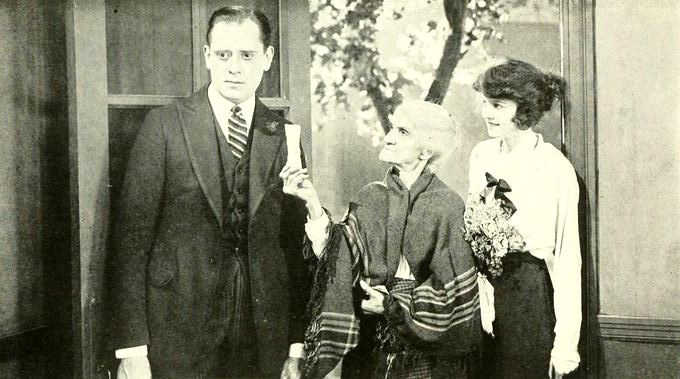
- Still with Sam Hardy and Doris Kenyon
- Directed by: Frank Borzage
- Written by: Luther Reed
- Based on: Get-Rich-Quick Wallingford (novel) by George Randolph Chester play adaptation by George M. Cohan
- Starring: Sam Hardy; Doris Kenyon
- Cinematography: Chester A. Lyons
- Distributed by: Paramount Pictures
- Release date: December 4, 1921
- Running time: 70 minutes; 7 reels
- Country: United States
- Language: Silent (English intertitles)

Get-Rich-Quick Wallingford is a lost 1921 American silent comedy film directed by Frank Borzage. The film's script was adapted by writer Luther Reed from the 1910 Broadway play by George M. Cohan, which in turn was adapted from the novel Get-Rich-Quick Wallingford by George Randolph Chester. Produced by Cosmopolitan Productions and distributed by Paramount Pictures Corporation, the film was released in seven reels on December 4, 1921.

Get-Rich-Quick Wallingford was the film being shown at the Knickerbocker Theatre in Washington when that building collapsed, killing 98 people and injuring 133.

== Plot ==
'Blackie' Daw arrives in the town of Battlesburg, Iowa. He has little money, but makes it known that J. Rufus Wallingford, a wealthy businessman, will be arriving in town soon and is interested in finding good investments. When Wallingford arrives, he and the townspeople hatch a scheme to build a factory, but they cannot decide what the factory should produce. Wallingford suggests carpet tacks, which he insists will interest other investors, and the townspeople agree. As time goes on, the company's stockholders begin to doubt Wallingford, who is, in fact, a con man. He is able to assuage their doubts. The establishment of the factory begins a real estate boom, and Wallingford and Daw are planning to skip town with the money they have made. But just before they do, a wealthy financier buys out Wallingford's interest and the factory makes a large sale of carpet tacks. As a result, Wallingford and Daw become wealthy by honest means. They both find women to marry, Wallingford to his stenographer Fannie Jasper and Daw to Dorothy Wells, daughter of a prominent town resident.

== Cast ==
- Sam Hardy as J. Rufus Wallingford
- Norman Kerry as 'Blackie' Daw
- Doris Kenyon as Fannie Jasper
- Diana Allen as Gertrude Dempsey
- Edgar Nelson as Eddie Lamb
- Billie Dove as Dorothy Wells
- Mac Barnes as Andrea Dempsey
- William T. Hayes as G.W. Battles
- Horace James as Timothy Battles
- John Woodford as Mr. Wells
- Mrs. Charles Willard as Mrs. Dempsey
- Eugene Keith as Harkins
- William Carr as Quigg
- William Robyns as Abe Gunther
- Theodore Westman Jr. as the bellboy
- Patterson Dial as Bessie
- Jerry Sinclair as Judge Hampton
