= George Randolph Chester =

American writer

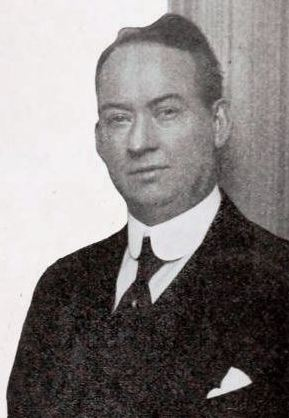
- Chester in 1921
- Born: January 27, 1869; Cincinnati, Ohio, US
- Died: February 26, 1924 (aged 55); New York City, US
- Occupations: Filmmaker, writer
- Spouse(s): Elizabeth Chester (1895–1911); Lillian Josephine Chester (1911–1924)

George Randolph Chester (January 27, 1869 – February 26, 1924) was an American writer and screenwriter, film editor, and director.

== Biography ==
Chester was born in Cincinnati, Ohio, on January 27, 1869. He was the author of such popular works such as Get-Rich-Quick Wallingford and Five Thousand an Hour: How Johnny Gamble Won the Heiress that were made into silent films within his lifetime. His success in selling stories to The Saturday Evening Post and leaving his position with the Cincinnati Enquirer and moving to New York City to write fiction was the impetus for James Hendryx to buy a typewriter and try his hand at writing fiction. Chester's first wife, Elizabeth Chester (whom he had married in Davenport, Iowa in July, 1895), divorced George in 1911, using the evidence that he was living at Gainsborough Studios in London with Lillian Josephine Chester. Elizabeth filed for divorce, and George and Lillian married while they were in Europe after hearing that the divorce was finalized. However, Elizabeth had only been granted an interlocutory decree, which made the divorce not final and therefore made his subsequent marriage to Lillian controversial. George and Lillian worked on several stories and plays together. George and Lillian only directed one film together, The Son of Wallingford (1921), which has been lost.

Writing as 'Felix Fiddle' Chester wrote the feature "Tales of the Jungle Imps" for the Cincinnati Enquirer. Originally published in 1903, it told fables as to how different animals acquired their various physical traits. These tales were illustrated by Winsor McCay.

Chester died on February 26, 1924, of a heart attack in his New York City home.

== Partial List of Written Works ==
- Get-Rich-Quick Wallingford (1908)
- The Cash Intrigue (1909)
- The Early Bird (1910)
- Young Wallingford (1910)
- Wallingford and Blackie Daw (1911)
- The Jingo (1912)
- Wallingford in His Prime (1913)
- A Tale of Red Roses (1914)

== Partial filmography ==
- The Making of Bobby Burnit (1914)
- Runaway June (1915)
- Get-Rich-Quick Wallingford (1916)
- The Message of the Mouse (1917)
- Twenty-One (1918)
- Five Thousand an Hour (1918)
- The Climbers (1919)
- The Vengeance of Durand (1919)
- Two Women (1919)
- The Tower of Jewels (1919)
- Slaves of Pride (1920)
- Trumpet Island (1920)
- The Birth of a Soul (1920)
- Black Beauty (1921)
- Get-Rich-Quick Wallingford (1921)
- The Son of Wallingford (1921)
- Top o' the Morning (1922)
- The Lavender Bath Lady (1922)
- The Scarlet Car (1923)
- Fools of Fashion (1926)
- The Head of the Family (1928)
- New Adventures of Get Rich Quick Wallingford (1931)
