= Anne Cornwall =

American actress (1897–1980)

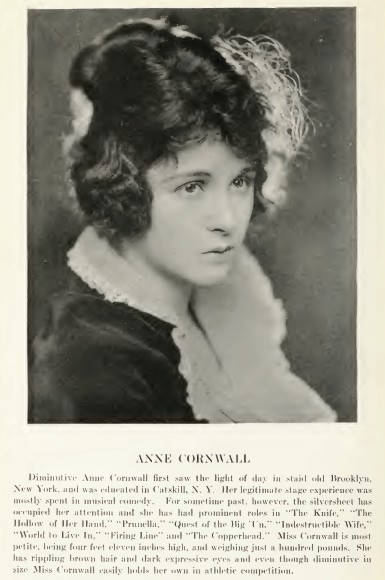
- Cornwall c. 1920
- Born: January 17, 1897; Brooklyn, New York, U.S.
- Died: March 2, 1980 (aged 83); Van Nuys, Los Angeles, California, U.S.
- Resting place: Glen Haven & Sholom Memorial Park; Sylmar, Los Angeles, California, U.S.
- Occupation: Actress
- Years active: 1916-1960
- Spouse(s): Charles Maigne (m. 1921-1929, his death); Ellis Wing Taylor (m. 1931-1938, divorce)
- Children: 1

Anne Cornwall (born Anna Mary Reardon; January 17, 1897 – March 2, 1980) was an American dancer, singer, and actress whose career on stage and in motion pictures spanned over four decades, from her early work as a "chorus girl" in musical theatre in New York City in 1916 to her screen performances in starring roles, as supporting characters, and in bit parts from 1918 to 1960. Cornwall's credited and uncredited film appearances total no less than 72 productions, the great majority being released prior to 1930. A few examples of her work in silent dramas are The Firing Line (1919), The Girl in the Rain (1920), and The Wrongdoers (1925). Cornwall was equally successful in comedies. Starring in a series of popular "Christie Comedies" in the mid-1920s, she was recognized in film-industry publications at the time as "One of the leading comediennes of two-reel comedies". That reputation led to her later being cast as Buster Keaton's girlfriend in the feature College (1927) and with Laurel and Hardy in their Hal Roach short Men O' War (1929).

== Early life ==
Anna Reardon was born in Brooklyn, New York, in 1897, the only child of Eleanor (née Thomson) from Scotland and John Reardon, a native of Pennsylvania. Three years after Anna's birth, the United States census of 1900 documents that only her mother and she were living together as boarders in the home of Emma A. Webb on Lexington Avenue in Brooklyn. In that same federal census, Eleanor identifies herself as still married but that her husband's whereabouts are noted as "Unknown". Eleanor by 1905 had departed Brooklyn with eight-year-old Anna and relocated 130 miles north to Catskill, New York, where they resided again as boarders in the household of the James Becker family at 68 Williams Street. There Eleanor worked as the Beckers' "servant", likely in exchange for reduced boarding costs. Soon, however, the Reardons' living arrangements changed when in 1906 Eleanor married Alfred Hand Cornwall, a longtime resident of Catskill and a plumber by trade.

Additional details about Anna's later childhood and teenage years growing up in Catskill can be gleaned from references to her in period film-industry publications and newspapers. With regard to her formal schooling, the 1921 edition of the Motion Picture Studio Directory and Trade Annual states only that she was educated in "Catskill, N.Y." That information is confirmed by a 1916 notice in Catskill's newspaper, The Examiner, which includes "Anna Cornwall" in the local high school's graduation roster of 28 students.

== Stage experience ==
Some insight into Cornwall's stage career prior to her transition to motion pictures is provided in comments about her found in trade magazines published between 1918 and 1921. According to those sources, Anna—later "Anne"—had "learned toe dancing" in Catskill before venturing to New York City at the age of 19 to try auditioning for musical theatre. Universal Pictures' company magazine The Moving Picture Weekly in its July 26, 1920 issue also identifies the specific Broadway theatre where she made her "first public appearance on the stage", in the small Princess Theatre on West 39th Street in Manhattan. The Weekly in that same issue states that Cornwall initially danced and sang in the chorus line at the Princess, in "those exquisite musical comedies for which that playhouse is famous", adding "it was not long before she was leading a number and doing a sole dance." Providing some additional information about Cornwall's pre-film career, the New York monthly Motion Picture Classic in its October 1920 issue summarizes her two seasons performing in musical theatre on Broadway and touches on what motivated her to move from stage to screen:

All her life she's wanted to be an a[c]tress. Finally the desire got so burning that she couldn't stand it any longer. She simply announced that she was going to try her luck in the chorus, got herself a job and learnt to dance. Her first season [1916-1917] was in the New York ensemble. Next season saw her doing a small singing and dancing bit in another musical comedy, Oh, Look! in which the Dolly Sisters and Harry Fox were featured. And then one day she surprised her sisters in the chorus by announcing her intention of "breaking into" pictures. She went to the World studios in the East and was cast in a very small part with Alice Brady. After that she went back to her show, danced some more, and got a call to be in another picture with Miss Brady.

== Film ==
The earliest references to "Anne Cornwall" in film-industry publications date from January 1918. Some of those references can be found in the widely read Chicago-based film journal Motography and its New York counterpart Motion Picture News. The January 5 issue of Motography includes her name in an announcement that Select Pictures was developing a new film starring Alice Brady, one based on the 1917 Broadway play The Knife. Motion Picture News also mentions Cornwall among the production's supporting players, and in an update on January 12 reports that the cast, including the fledgling actress, was already filming The Knife's interior scenes at Select's 56th Street Studio in Manhattan.

The remainder of 1918 and 1919 brought more screen roles to Cornwall, two of which were in additional films starring Alice Brady, In the Hollow of Her Hand (1918) and The Indestructible Wife (1919). Anne also garnered more industry attention and public notice for her appearance in an uncredited but "prominent" role in the romantic fantasy film Prunella (1918), as the bride in The World To Live In (1919), and as Cecile in The Firing Line (1919). Another part she played at that time was a "fisherwoman" in Quest of the Big 'Un, a one-reel "scenic comedy" released by Educational Pictures in August 1918 on the various techniques and skills required to fish successfully in rivers and creeks. Shot on location in Catskill, New York, and directed by Cornwall's future husband Charles Maigne, the actress portrayed a "charming young lady" and demonstrated on screen her real-life expertise in fly-fishing for trout, a sport Anne had enjoyed since her youth and growing up in Catskill.

Following Cornwall's initial work in short films and features, she began receiving more substantial roles. The next decade proved to be the most active and successful period of her motion-picture career as she worked for a variety of studios. In addition to Select Pictures and Universal, she would be cast in productions by Artcraft Pictures, First National, Warner Bros., RKO, Fox, Christie Film Company, Educational Pictures, Paramount, United Artists, Gotham Pictures, Hal Roach Studios, Pathé, and by several small film companies represented by Associated Exhibitors.

=== The Girl in the Rain ===
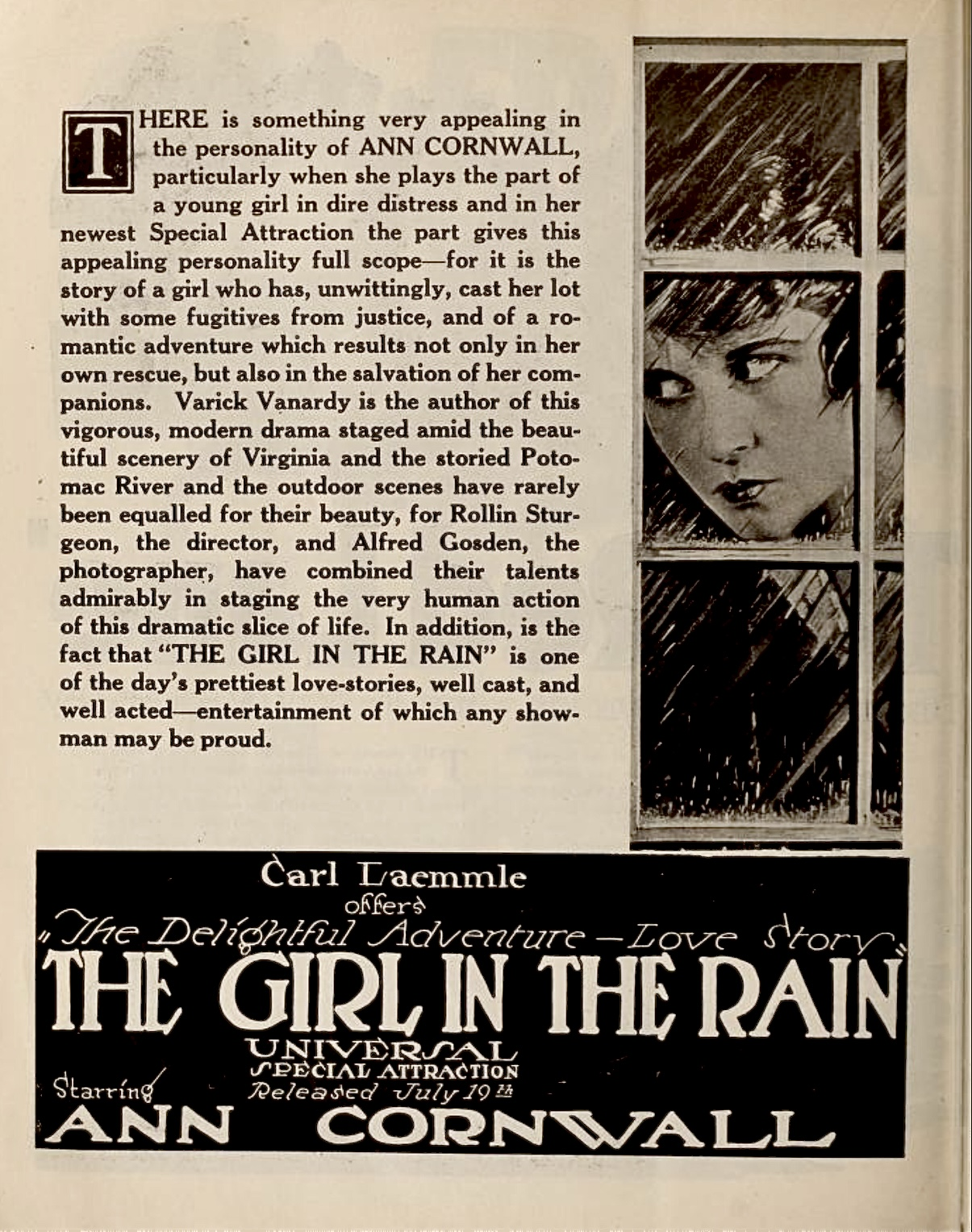
Universal ad for The Girl in the Rain with "Anne" misspelled, 1920

Cornwall in 1920 received additional positive reviews as a "weepy" supporting character in The Copperhead starring Lionel Barrymore. The director of that production was once again Charles Maigne, whom Cornwall would marry the next year. After that project with Paramount, she was cast in her first leading role in Universal's melodrama The Path She Chose (1920), a story about a plucky "handicapped lass". The Moving Picture World in its review of her performance wrote, "Anne Cornwall has an intelligent conception of the part she plays and is exceptionally well cast in the role of a young woman reared in a home of unsound principles who struck out for herself." But in the opinion of Motion Picture Classic, it was the actress's casting in two other films in 1920 that significantly elevated her status with studio executives and reviewers, as well her popularity with theatergoers. One was the previously mentioned film The Copperhead; the other was The Girl in the Rain in which Cornwall co-starred with Lloyd Bacon:

Almost everything Anne has ever done on the screen has been with her [Alice Brady]—until she played the ingenue role in "The Copperhead" with Lionel Barrymore. That role, of course, established her. The Universal people saw her work and decided to "import" her to their West Coast studios. And there she was, working in one of those downtrodden-factory-girl parts in a story called "The Girl in the Rain"….

For her portrayal of Judith in The Girl in the Rain, Cornwall received even more coverage in trade journals and newspapers. She next played the title character in La La Lucille. That elaborate five-reeler, released in July 1920, had a storyline based on another Broadway musical comedy with the same title. Unfortunately, today no copies of either La La Lucille or The Girl in the Rain have been found. Both motion pictures are therefore classified as "lost" by the Library of Congress.

=== 1921 to 1931 ===
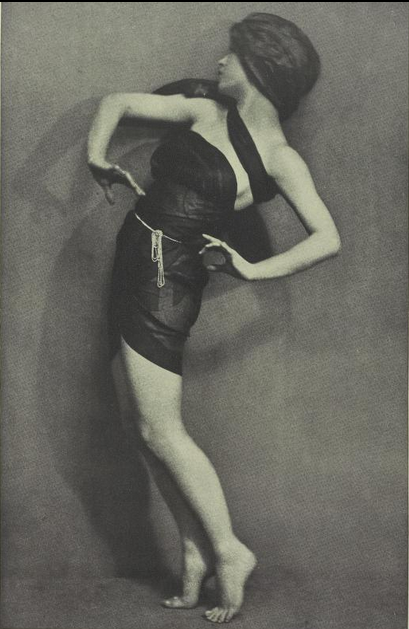
"Portrait study" of Cornwall by Nickolas Muray, published in Shadowland, 1921

Cornwall took a year-long break from working in films after marrying Charles Maigne in February 1921. Her available filmographies confirm that hiatus from acting, showing no known 1921 releases in which she performed. Early in this pause in her career, perhaps to help maintain her profile in the industry, Cornwall posed for a full-body portrait by renowned Hungarian-born photographer Nickolas Muray. Muray's image depicts the "pretty motion picture favorite" tightly wrapped in sheer fabric. The photograph—one quite risqué for its time—is featured in the May 1921 issue of Shadowland, a high-end New York monthly dedicated to showcasing people working in theatre, film, and the fine arts.

The 1924 edition of Stars of the Photoplay states that Cornwall's absence from acting was longer than one year, noting then that "She has been away from the screen for several years, but is steadily winning her way back into the hearts of the fans." Contrary to that publication's statement, the actress definitely returned to work on movie sets by early 1922, not "several years" later. She played Betty Alden, a major supporting character in First National's romantic drama The Seventh Day, which premiered on February 6 that year. She was also cast in at least two additional Paramount films in 1922, playing the "invalid sister" in support of Gloria Swanson in Her Gilded Cage, released in April, and as Lady Jane Carr in To Have and to Hold, released in October.

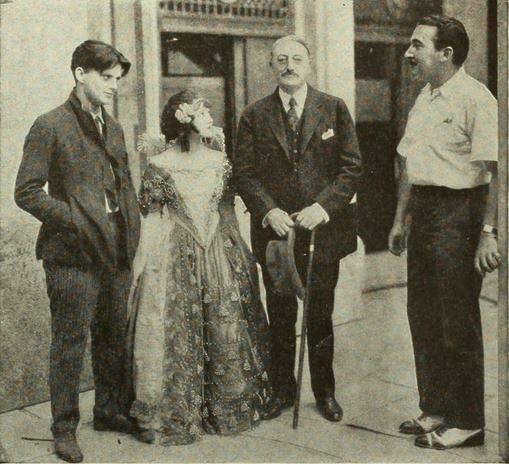
In late-Elizabethan costume, Cornwall chats with visitors to the set of Have and to Hold, 1922

==== "One of the leading comediennes of two-reel comedies" ====
Between 1923 and 1931, Cornwall continued to secure starring roles and important secondary parts in assorted genres such as crime dramas, action-packed Westerns, and slapstick comedies. She was cast in at least 32 more "photoplays" during this period. In 1925 she worked once more with Lionel Barrymore, although this time as his co-star in the crime drama The Wrongdoers. She performed again too as Universal's "dainty piece of femininity" and romantic lead opposite cowboy star Hoot Gibson in The Flaming Frontier (1926). Cornwall also starred in at least nine "Christie Comedy" shorts, establishing herself by the mid-1920s as "One of the leading comediennes of two-reel comedies". Christie Film Company in its press sheets for her 1926 short Cool Off! declares, "Miss Cornwall…proves that she can bring as many laughs as her male brother players who have so long practically monopolized screen comedies."

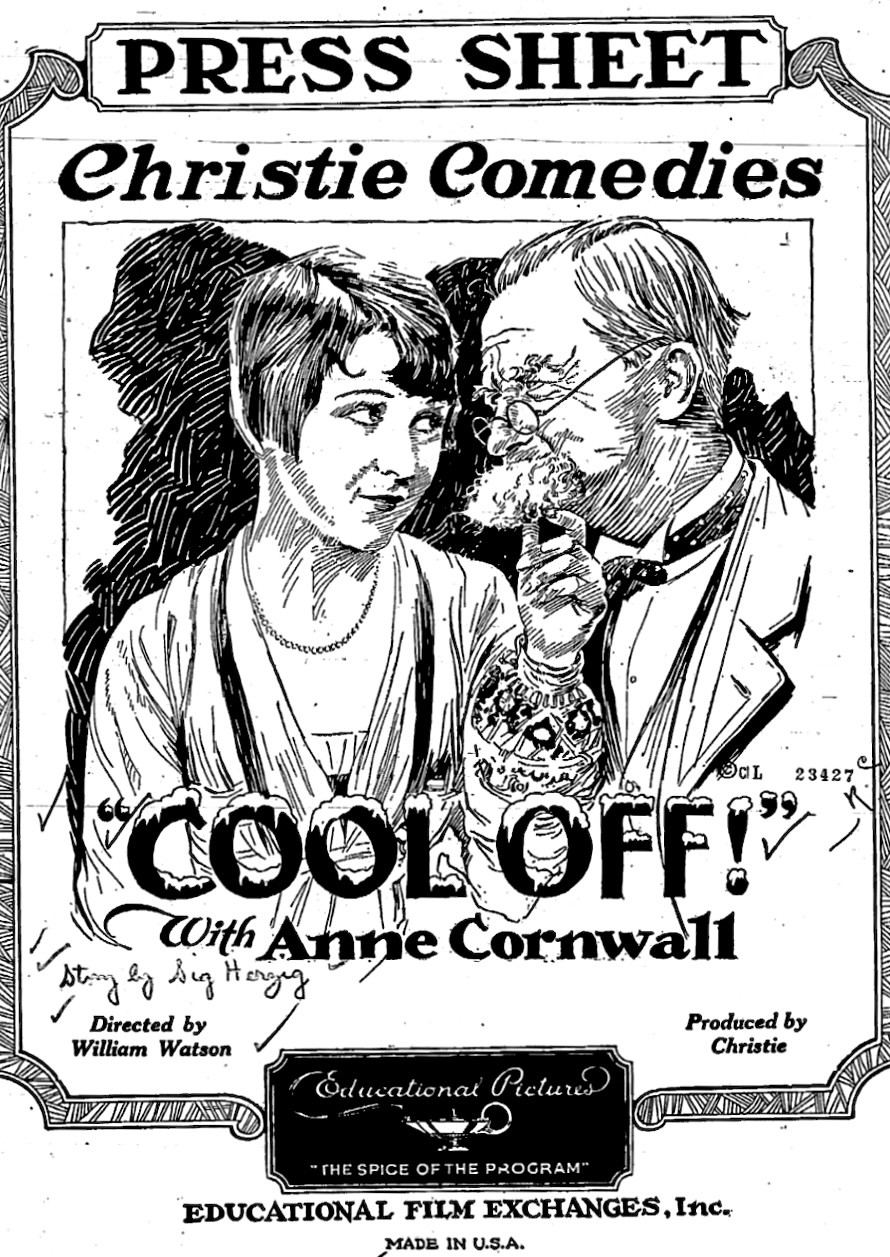
Promotion for Cool Off! (1926) co-starring Cornwall and Jack Duffy

A few other titles of Cornwall's Christie shorts are Bright Lights (1924), available for viewing on the streaming service YouTube; French Pastry (1925); and Chicken Feathers (1927), which is a release that film historian James Roots includes as an entry in his 2017 book 100 Essential Silent Film Comedies. Her considerable experience working for Christie led to Cornwall being cast in other productions with top talents in Hollywood comedies. She subsequently played Buster Keaton's girlfriend in the feature College (1927) and one of Laurel and Hardy's chance encounters in the short Men O' War (1929), the latter being the actress's first confirmed performance in a sound film.

Three other early pre-Code "talkies" in which Cornwall performed are Warner's eight-minute "bedroom farce" The Baby Bandit (1930), First National's crime drama The Widow from Chicago (1930), and RKO's High Stakes (1931) in which she is credited in reviews playing Karen Morley, a central supporting character caught up in a love triangle. Cornwall during this time was also returning periodically to perform on stage. One example was in March 1929, when The Washington Times in D.C. reported in its Hollywood updates that "the petite ficker-ite" was performing as "the heroine" in a rendition of the 1923 play Broadway at the Vine Street Theatre in Los Angeles, along with fellow cast members Franklin Pangborn, James Crane, and Isabel Withers. Another example occurred the following year. The entertainment newspaper Variety announced in its January 29, 1930 issue that Cornwall had recently made her debut at the Dufwin Theatre in Oakland, California, starring in another revival of a 1923 Broadway production, Give and Take.

==== "57 Inches of Talent" ====
"Of all the small-sized actresses in Hollywood", observed the fan magazine Photoplay in 1925, "Anne Cornwall is about the tiniest." Such comments about the screen performer's size are made frequently in period publications. The actress was indeed unusually short in height for an adult, a physical characteristic that proved to be an advantage for her over the years in obtaining roles playing little sisters, precocious teens, "'half pint'" heroines, and 95-pound (43 kg) "baby Venus de Milo's".

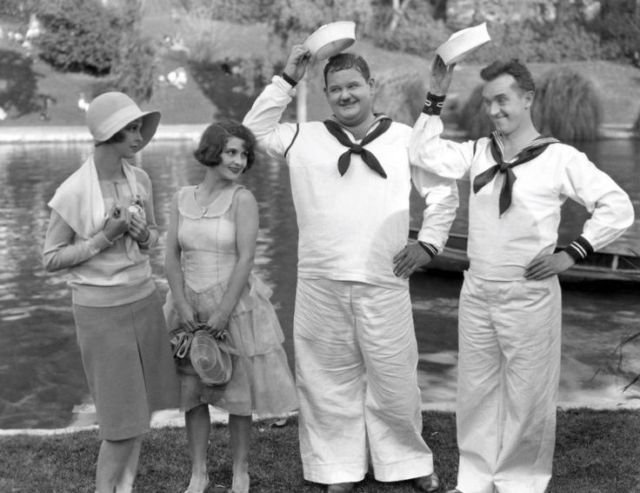
The "tiny" Cornwall (second from left) in Laurel and Hardy's Men O' War (1929)

Cornwall's reported height varied from source to source over the years, ranging from one inch to three inches under five feet. The Moving Picture Weekly in its July 10, 1920 edition lists her as a mere 4 feet, 9 inches (145 cm) and labels the 23-year-old as "57 Inches of Talent". The Weekly in that same issue also recounts how Cornwall herself often joked about her height and even demonstrated how easily she could pass herself off as a child in public:

Anne is so tiny that on a recent trip from Los Angeles to San Francisco, she wagered a friend she could ride for half fare. Curling her feet under her on the chair and letting down her dark-brown curls, she handed the conductor a child's ticket, and it was punched without a word. After she had collected the amount of the wager…she explained the matter to the conductor and paid him the balance of the fare.

Later, in 1926, Picture-Play Magazine compared the respective heights of 16 leading actresses who were deemed among the shortest performers in American cinema at the time. The monthly publication judged Cornwall once again to be the "Tiniest Girl in Pictures", although by Picture-Play's measuring tape she stood 4 feet, 10.5 inches (148.6 cm).

==== WAMPAS Baby Star ====
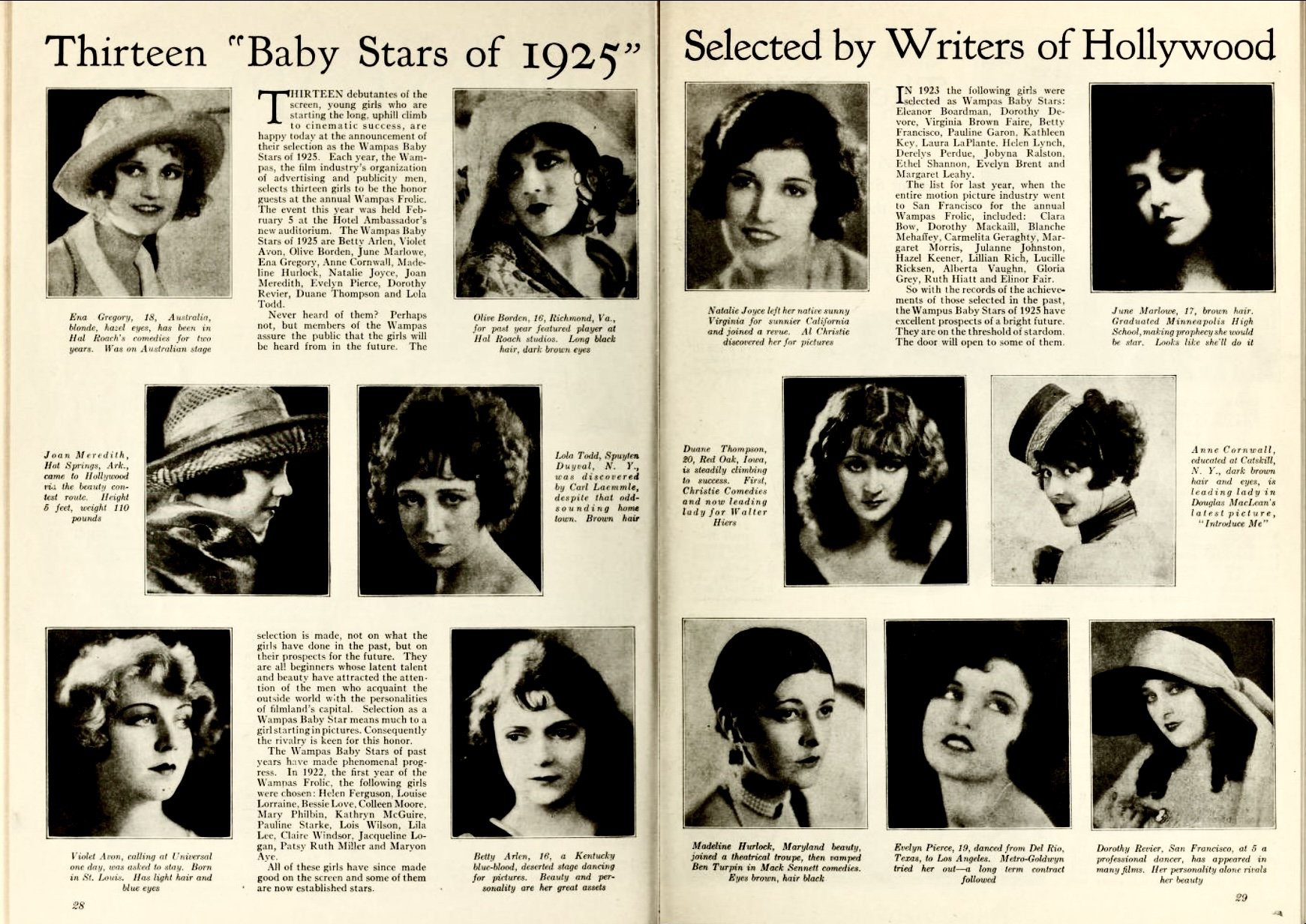
Cornwall (middle row, far right) with other "Baby Stars", Photoplay, March 1925

In 1925 Cornwall was chosen by the Western Association of Motion Picture Advertisers (WAMPAS) as one of its "Baby Stars" in the American film industry. The annual honor, established three years earlier, involved the selection of 13 young actresses (15 in 1932) who WAMPAS believed showed great potential for stardom in their "long, uphill climb [to] cinematic success". In addition to Cornwall, the other actresses chosen as the Baby Stars of 1925 were Betty Arlen, Violet Avon, Olive Borden, June Marlowe, Ena Gregory, Madeline Hurlock, Natalie Joyce, Joan Meredith, Evelyn Pierce, Dorothy Revier, Duane Thompson, and Lola Todd. The "WAMPAS Frolic", the official ceremony to award Anne and the other 1925 inductees with "certificates of merit", was held February 5, 1925 in the auditorium of the Ambassador Hotel in Los Angeles.

=== 1932-1960 ===
Either due to Cornwall's personal choices after her second marriage in 1931 or in response to decisions made by studio casting directors, she once again stepped back from acting, although much farther back this time than in 1921. She appeared only occasionally on the screen over the next three decades. Not only did the number of her film appearances drop dramatically after 1931 but so did the quality of her roles, devolving over time to very minor uncredited parts in assorted productions. Her available filmographies and news items in trade publications show that from 1932 until 1960, she was cast in only two dozen productions in 28 years. Her next part in a motion picture after 1931 was not until 1937, the same year she separated from her second husband, Ellis Taylor. That year she played an uncredited alternate juror in Paramount's screwball comedy True Confession. The timing of Cornwall's return to a film set suggests that she may have needed a bit of extra income at the time to support herself and the son she had five years earlier with Taylor. Possibly, too, her reappearance in a film project was a means for her to reconnect with personnel she knew in the industry. Whatever the reasons, she returned again in 1938 and 1939 for uncredited parts in two very popular movies, as Miss Jones, a secretary, in You Can't Take It with You and as a reporter in Mr. Smith Goes to Washington. Then, through the 1940s and 1950s, Cornwall continued to appear intermittently in theatrical releases.

Some of Cornwall's returns to the screen mentioned in film magazines in those decades have not been included in current online and printed filmographies of her work. They include The Great John L (1945), Whistle Stop (1946), and The Woman in White (1948). Later, according to the American Film Institute catalog, Anne Cornwall was among a large number of actors cast as extras or in bit parts, once again uncredited, in the 1960 science-fiction comedy Visit to a Small Planet starring Jerry Lewis.

== Personal life ==
Cornwall pursued a variety of hobbies when not working on films and later in semi-retirement. A sports enthusiast, the actress quickly gained a reputation early in her Hollywood career for her skills and determined attitude to excel in any recreational contest. In her biographical profile published in Who's Who on the Screen in 1920, the studio reference notes, "…even though diminutive in size Miss Cornwall easily holds her own in athletic competition". Fishing and hunting, though, were her favorite leisure activities ever since childhood and residing in upstate New York in a town adjacent to the Hudson River and near Catskill Creek, a 46-mile-long tributary of the Hudson teeming with trout and surrounded by forests full of wild game. In an interview with Picture-Play Magazine for its January 1921 issue, Cornwall describes to a reporter her recent fishing excursions as well as her first experience hunting with a shotgun:

The [film] company worked Sunday, but I went fishing at Big Bear. Caught one trout. But the Sunday before, at Catalina, I got seven barracuda, a lot of mackerel, and one shark.…But what I like is trout fishing. Dry fly and two-and-a-half ounce rod. You have to go after them. None of this dangling the bait and waiting for a flabby old fish to nab it…. I like hunting. I remember my first gun. It was a regular doublebarreled shotgun, and it looked as big as a cannon to me. I shot a squirrel, and the gun made so much noise I thought it was broken. While I was looking at the gun I lost track of the squirrel. Or maybe I blew it to pieces.

=== Other activities ===
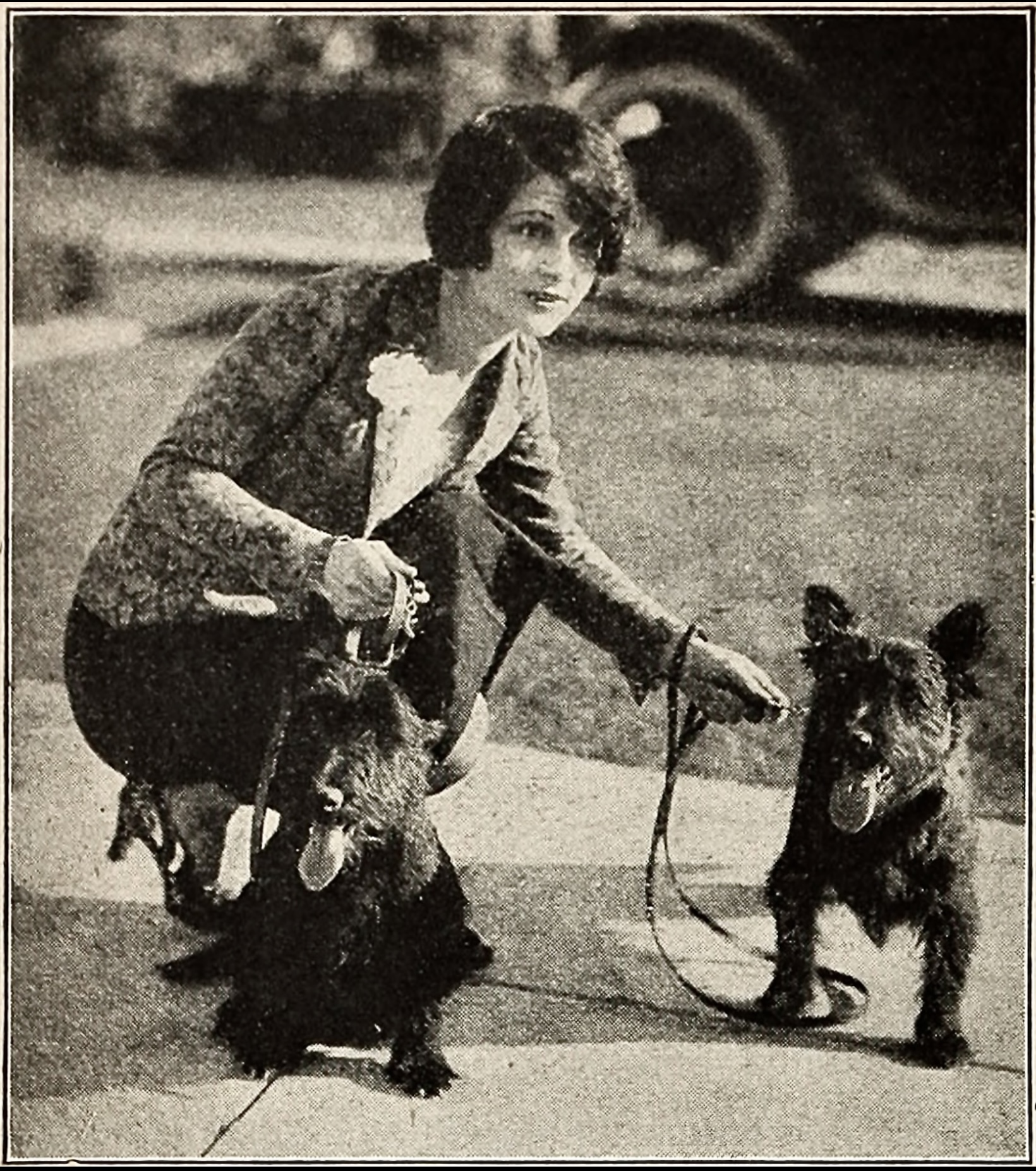
Cornwall with two of her Scottish Terriers, May 1926

Cornwall for years was involved in entering her beloved Scottish Terrier "Scotties" in local and regional dog shows. Photoplay in 1924 reported on her participation in one such event:

THE motion picture industry was well represented in the recent California dog show held in Hollywood.…Al Christie, producer of the Christie comedies, also came away with a number of blue ribbons tucked under his arm. Enid Bennett showed her beautiful Chow, "Buddha," in the puppy class and captured honors, as did Anne Cornwall (Mrs. Charles Maigne) with her Scottish terrier.

Cornwall was active too during the final decades of her life publicly promoting the Screen Actors Guild (SAG), a labor union originally founded in 1933 to represent collectively the interests of performers in the film industry, foremost in improving and standardizing their pay and working conditions. In the 1950s, she also donated an appreciable amount of her personal time helping to administer the Guild by serving on its board of directors alongside fellow actors such as William Holden, Louise Beavers, Van Heflin, Audrey Totter, Walter Pidgeon, Agnes Moorehead, and Tyrone Power.

=== Marriages ===
Cornwall married twice, the first time to writer/director Charles Maigne in Babylon, New York, on February 12, 1921. By 1929 their relationship had declined to the point that film-industry publications reported in August that the couple had been living apart for nearly a year. Then, on November 28, 1929, just before "their divorce suit was about to be settled in court", 50-year-old Charles died at Letterman Army Hospital in San Francisco from a final "breakdown" in his health after contracting pneumonia.

In September 1931, almost two years after Maigne's death, Anne married Ellis Wing Taylor Sr, a prominent architect in Los Angeles and a renowned yachtsman. By 1937 Anne and Ellis had separated, with "the former actress" filing "for separate maintenance" to help support herself and their only child, Peter Tracy Taylor. Following her divorce from Ellis, Cornwall continued to use his surname, at least in her personal life, until 1940, when the federal census that year confirms that "Anne C. Taylor" was officially divorced. The 1940 census also documents that the couple's seven-year-old son remained with her in Los Angeles. The next census, in 1950, lists Anne as head of household and that she had reverted to using "Cornwall" personally as well as professionally. It also shows her employment status still as "Acting" at "Movie Studio".

== Death ==
In February 1980, 83-year-old Cornwall was still residing with her son Peter in North Hollywood. Soon, though, her declining health due to arteriosclerosis required her admission to Beverly Manor Convalescent Hospital in Van Nuys, California, where she died of "circulatory failure" on March 2.

== Partial filmography ==
- The Knife (1918) (uncredited)
- Prunella (1918) - (uncredited)
- In the Hollow of Her Hand (1918) - (uncredited)
- Quest of the Big 'Un (1918) - "Fisherwoman”
- The Indestructible Wife (1919) - Toots Brooks
- The World to Live In (1919) - Bride
- The Firing Line (1919) - Cecile Cardross
- The Copperhead (1920) - Madeline
- The Path She Chose (1920) - Virginia (starring)
- Everything but the Truth (1920) - Annabelle Elton
- The Girl in the Rain (1920) - Judith (co-starring)
- La La Lucille (1920) - Lucille Smith
- The Seventh Day (1922) - Betty Alden
- Her Gilded Cage (1922) - Jacqueline Ornoff
- To Have and to Hold (1922) - Lady Jane Carr
- Only 38 (1923) - Mary Hedley
- Dulcy (1923) - Angela Forbes
- The Gold Diggers (1923) - Violet Dayne
- Arizona Express (1924) - Florence Brown
- 40-Horse Hawkins (1924) - Mary Darling
- The Roughneck (1924) - Zelle
- Bright Lights (1924) - "Ann" (co-starring with Jack Duffy)
- Introduce Me (1925) - Betty Perry
- The Rainbow Trail (1925) - Fay Larkin
- The Wrongdoers (1925) - Helen Warren
- French Pastry (1925) - Celeste (co-starring)
- Keep Smiling (1925) - Rose Ryan
- The Splendid Crime (1925) - Beth Van Dyke
- Cool Off! (1926) – Anne (starring)
- Under Western Skies (1926) - Ella Parkhurst
- The Flaming Frontier (1926) - Betty Stanwood
- Racing Blood (1926) - Muriel Sterlinng
- Hold Still (1926) - Photojournalist (starring)
- Eyes of the Totem (1927) - Betty Hardy
- The Heart of the Yukon (1927) - Anita Wayne (co-starring)
- Chicken Feathers (1927)- Anne Kale (co-starring with Jack Duffy)
- Scared Pink (1927) - The Girl (co-starring)
- College (1927) - Mary Haynes
- Loves Young Scream (1928) - The Girl
- Fighting Fannie (1928) - Anne
- Half-Back Hannah (1928) - Anne
- Men O' War (1929, Short) - Brunette
- The Baby Bandit (1930) – (co-starred with Bobby Watson)
- The Widow from Chicago (1930) - Mazie (uncredited)
- True Confession (1937) - Alternate Juror (uncredited)
- You Can't Take It with You (1938) - Miss Jones - Blakely's Secretary (uncredited)
- Mr. Smith Goes To Washington (1939) - Senate Reporter (uncredited)
- Triple Justice (1940) - Wedding Guest (uncredited)
- The Climax (1944) - Minor Role (uncredited)
- The Great John L (1945) - (uncredited)
- The Southerner (1945) - Townswoman (uncredited)
- Don't Gamble with Strangers (1946) - Servant (uncredited)
- Whistle Stop (1946) (uncredited)
- Below the Deadline (1946) - Minor Role (uncredited)
- They Won't Believe Me (1947) - Screaming Woman in Courtroom (uncredited)
- The Woman in White (1948) (uncredited)
- Isn't It Romantic? (1948) - Townswoman (uncredited)
- Knock on Any Door (1949) - Woman (uncredited)
- The Miracle of Our Lady of Fatima (1952) - Lucia (uncredited)
- Destry (1954) - Townswoman (uncredited)
- Untamed (1955) - Pioneer Woman (uncredited)
- The Search for Bridey Murphy (1956) - Mother (uncredited)
- The Buster Keaton Story (1957) - Mrs. Jennings (uncredited)
- The Wild and the Innocent (1959) - Bit Role (uncredited)
- Visit to a Small Planet (1960) - Bit Role (uncredited, final film role)
