= Racing Blood =

Racing Blood refers to the following films:

- Racing Blood (1926 film), an American silent film
- Racing Blood (1936 film), an American film
- Racing Blood (1954 film), an American film
