= The Heart of the Yukon =

1927 film

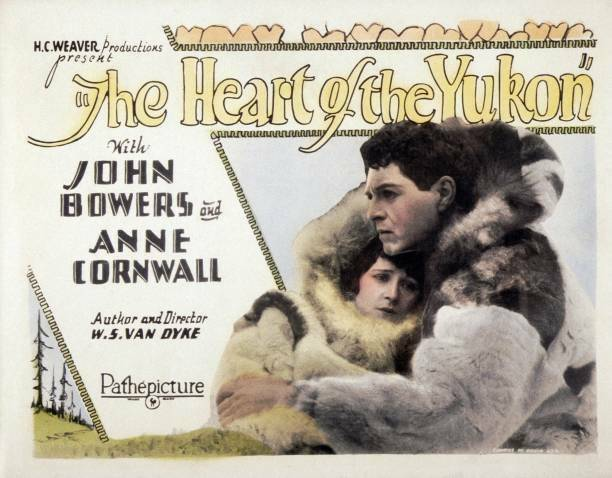
- Directed by: W.S. Van Dyke
- Written by: Everett C. Maxwell; W.S. Van Dyke
- Produced by: H.C. Weaver
- Starring: John Bowers; Anne Cornwall; Edward Hearn
- Cinematography: Abe Scholtz; David Smith
- Production company: H.C. Weaver Productions
- Distributed by: Pathé Exchange
- Release date: May 29, 1927
- Running time: 7 reels
- Country: United States
- Languages: Silent; English intertitles

The Heart of the Yukon is a 1927 American silent adventure film directed by W.S. Van Dyke and starring John Bowers, Anne Cornwall and Edward Hearn.

== Cast ==
- John Bowers as Jim Winston
- Anne Cornwall as Anita Wayne
- Edward Hearn as Jack Waite
- Frank Campeau as Old Skin Full
- Russell Simpson as 'Cash' Cynon
- George Jeske as Bartender

== Bibliography ==
- Munden, Kenneth White. The American Film Institute Catalog of Motion Pictures Produced in the United States, Part 1. University of California Press, 1997.
