= Keep Smiling (1925 film) =

1925 film

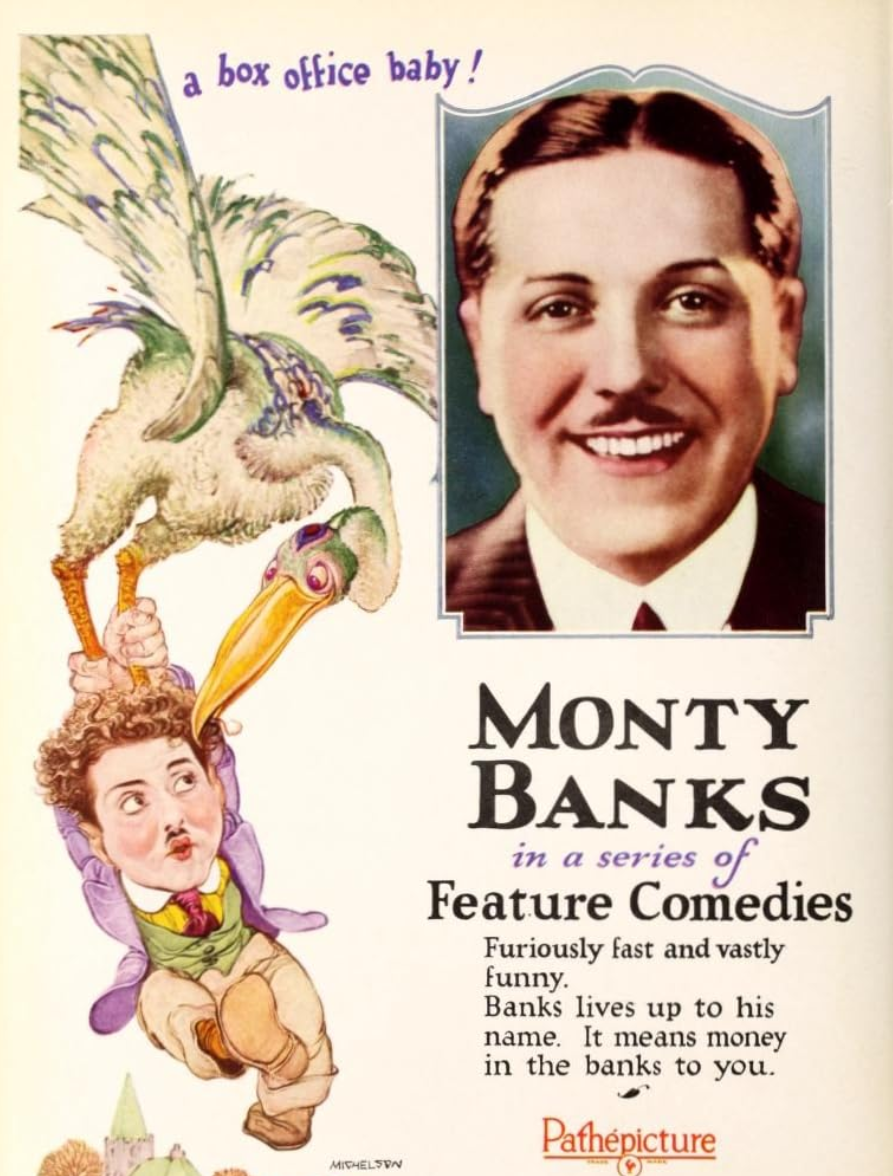
- Directed by: Albert Austin; Gilbert Pratt
- Written by: Monty Banks; Clyde Bruckman; Herman C. Raymaker
- Produced by: Monty Banks
- Starring: Monty Banks; Robert Edeson; Anne Cornwall
- Cinematography: James Diamond; Lee Garmes; Barney McGill
- Edited by: Claude Berkeley
- Production company: Monty Banks Productions
- Distributed by: Associated Exhibitors; Ideal Films (UK)
- Release date: September 6, 1925
- Running time: 60 minutes
- Country: United States
- Language: Silent (English intertitles)

Keep Smiling is a 1925 American silent comedy film directed by Albert Austin and Gilbert Pratt. It stars Monty Banks (real name Mario Bianchi) and Glen Cavender. The film was originally titled "Water Shy".

The story features a boy with a fear of water who invents a life preserver that inflates when it comes in contact with water. Promoting his invention, he becomes involved with a wild speedboat race, a crooked mechanic, and the darling daughter of a boating magnate.

== Plot ==
As described in a film magazine reviews, the Boy (Monty Banks), a yokel of the fishing village, has grown up in fear of the water because his father had been lost at sea. He has invented a lifesaving device which he wishes to submit to James P. Ryan, a wealthy shipping magnate. He has a letter of introduction to Ryan which gets mixed up with a letter introducing Bordanni, a famed motor boat racer who is to handle Ryan’s entry in the race classic the following day. The Boy is rushed into a party in full swing (after being supplied with clothes which all fit except for the shoes). Ryan’s daughter Rose (Anne Cornwall), whose life he has once saved, is overjoyed to find that her one-time rescuer is the famous Bordanni and expresses the hope that he will win the race. Of course, in spite of all setbacks, lack of knowledge, and adverse circumstances, he wins a most breath-taking and riotous race — houses, boats, bridges, docks, etc., were just like thin air to him. His boat is demolished, but he is saved because of his lifesaving device.

== Cast ==
- Monty Banks as The Boy
- Robert Edeson as James P. Ryan
- Anne Cornwall as Rose Ryan
- Stanhope Wheatcroft as Gerald Deane
- Glen Cavender as Doublecrosser
- Donald Morelli as Bordanni
- Syd Crossley as Ryan's Butler
- Ruth Holly as Ryan's Secretary
- Martha Franklin as The Mother
- Jack Huff as The Child

== Preservation ==
A print of Keep Smiling was preserved in the Russian archive Gosfilmofond and presented to the Library of Congress in 2010.
