= The Indestructible Wife =

1919 silent film

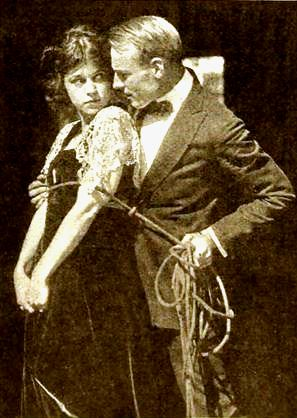
- Directed by: Charles Maigne
- Written by: Fanny Hatton (play); Frederic Hatton (play); Charles Maigne
- Starring: Alice Brady; Percy Marmont; Anne Cornwall
- Cinematography: Leo Rossi
- Production company: Select Pictures
- Distributed by: Select Pictures
- Release date: January 26, 1919
- Running time: 50 minutes
- Country: United States
- Languages: Silent; English intertitles

The Indestructible Wife is a 1919 American silent romantic comedy film directed by Charles Maigne and starring Alice Brady, Percy Marmont and Anne Cornwall.

== Cast ==
- Alice Brady as Charlotte Ordway
- Anne Cornwall as Toots Brooks
- Percy Marmont as Schuyler Horne
- Saxon Kling as Jim Ordway
- Sue Balfour as Mother
- George Backus as Father
- Roy Adams as Brandy
- William A. Williams as Peter Brooks
- Leonore Hughes as Julia Cleves
- Thomas Donnelly as Butler

== Bibliography ==
- Goble, Alan. The Complete Index to Literary Sources in Film. Walter de Gruyter, 1999.
