= The Roughneck =

Lost 1924 film by Jack Conway

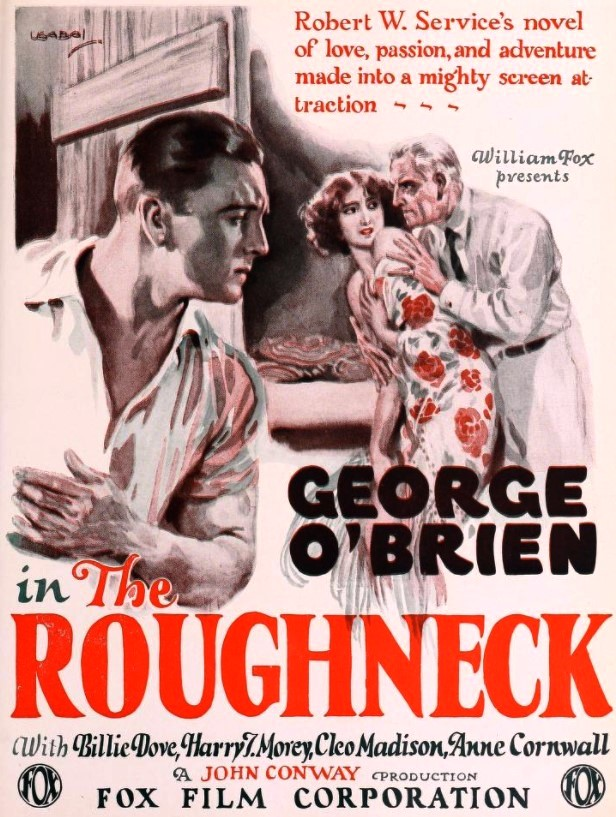
- Advertisement
- Directed by: Jack Conway
- Screenplay by: Charles Kenyon
- Based on: The Roughneck by Robert W. Service
- Starring: George O'Brien; Billie Dove; Harry T. Morey; Cleo Madison; Charles Sellon; Anne Cornwall
- Cinematography: George Schneiderman
- Production company: Fox Film Corporation
- Distributed by: Fox Film Corporation
- Release date: November 30, 1924
- Running time: 80 minutes
- Country: United States
- Language: Silent (English intertitles)

The Roughneck is a lost 1924 American silent romantic adventure film directed by Jack Conway and written by Charles Kenyon. It is based on the 1923 novel The Roughneck by Robert W. Service. The film stars George O'Brien, Billie Dove, Harry T. Morey, Cleo Madison, Charles Sellon, and Anne Cornwall. The film was released on November 30, 1924, by Fox Film Corporation.

== Plot ==
As described in a review in a film magazine, Mad McCara, a sea captain, on the promise of marriage lures the widow Delaney aboard his ship. A collision in the harbor gives him the chance to tell her that her son Jerry was drowned, though he sent him ashore.

Years pass. McCara has tired of Mrs. Delaney, who has found shelter with the natives on the tropical isle of Taohing. Jerry, grown to manhood, conquers his adversary in a prize fight and, believing him dead, escapes by hiding on a ship bound for Taohing. He is discovered and Felicity, a woman going to the tropics to paint pictures, becomes interested in him. To escape from being sent back home, he starts to swim ashore. Zelle, a young native woman, rescues him from a shark. McCara, now prosperous and using an assumed name, seeks to win Felicity, but she declares her love for Jerry. To save her from his disgrace, he pretends he does not love her. Felicity seeks shelter in McCara's home from the rain.

To convince Jerry of Felicity's peril, his mother discloses her identity. Jerry arrives in time to save Felicity and avenge his mother. Returning home with his mother and Felicity to take his medicine, he learns that the man he thought he killed in the prize fight is still alive.

== Cast ==
- George O'Brien as Jerry Delaney
- Billie Dove as Felicity Arden
- Harry T. Morey as Mad McCara
- Cleo Madison as Anne Delaney
- Charles Sellon as Sam Melden
- Anne Cornwall as Zelle
- Harvey Clark as Fight Manager
- Marion Aye as Marrat's Girl
- Edna Eichor as Zamina
- Buddy Smith as Jerry Delaney (at age 3)
- Carmencita Johnson as Baby
- Cammilla Johnson as Little girl (uncredited)
- Seessel Anne Johnson as Girl (uncredited)
- Jack Parker as Child (uncredited)

== Preservation ==
With no copies of The Roughneck located in any film archives, it is a lost film.

== See also ==
- 1937 Fox vault fire
