= Oliver Twist, Jr. =

1921 film

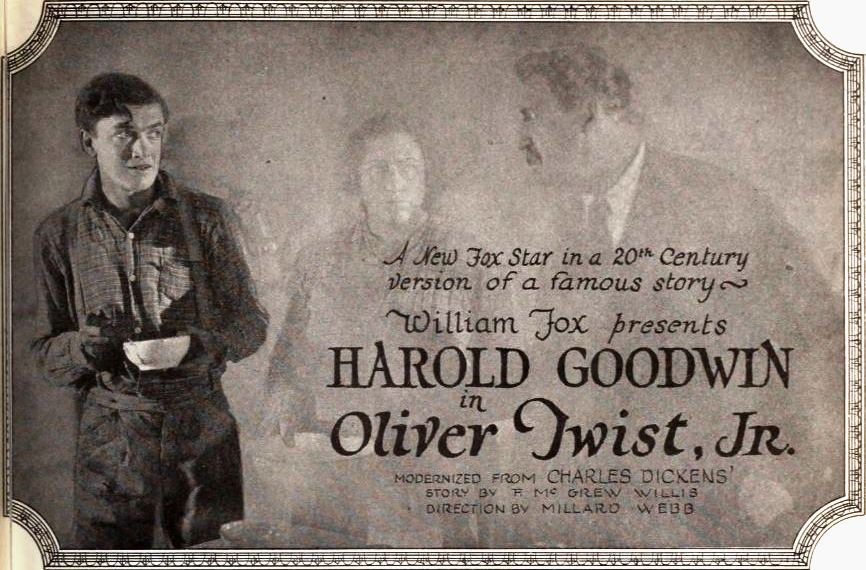
- Advertisement for Oliver Twist, Jr. on page 5 of the Exhibitors Herald (March 12, 1921).
- Directed by: Millard Webb
- Story by: F. McGrew Willis
- Based on: Oliver Twist; 1837 novel by Charles Dickens
- Produced by: William Fox
- Starring: Harold Goodwin; Lillian Hall; George Nichols; Harold Esboldt; Scott McKee; Clarence Wilson; G. Raymond Nye
- Cinematography: William C. Foster
- Production company: Fox Film Corporation
- Distributed by: Fox Film Corporation
- Release date: March 13, 1921
- Running time: 50 minutes
- Country: United States
- Language: Silent film with English intertitles

Oliver Twist, Jr. is a 1921 American silent drama film directed by Millard Webb and starring Harold Goodwin, Lillian Hall, George Nichols, Harold Esboldt, Scott McKee, Clarence Wilson, and G. Raymond Nye. It is based on the 1838 novel Oliver Twist by Charles Dickens. The film was released by Fox Film Corporation on March 13, 1921.

== Plot ==
An orphan named Oliver Twist, Jr. meets a pickpocket on the streets of London. From there, he joins a group of thieves who are trained to steal for their master.

== Cast ==
- Harold Goodwin as Oliver Twist, Jr.
- Lillian Hall as Ruth Norris
- George Nichols as Schoolmaster
- Harold Esboldt as Dick
- Scott McKee as Artful Dodger
- Clarence Wilson as Fagin
- G. Raymond Nye as Bill Sykes
- Hayward Mack as Monks
- Pearl Lowe as Mrs. Morris
- George Clair as James Harrison
- Fred Kirby as Judson
- Irene Hunt as Nancy

== Preservation ==
A copy of Oliver Twist, Jr. exists in Cinemateket Svenska Filminstitutet, Stockholm.
