= In the Hollow of Her Hand =

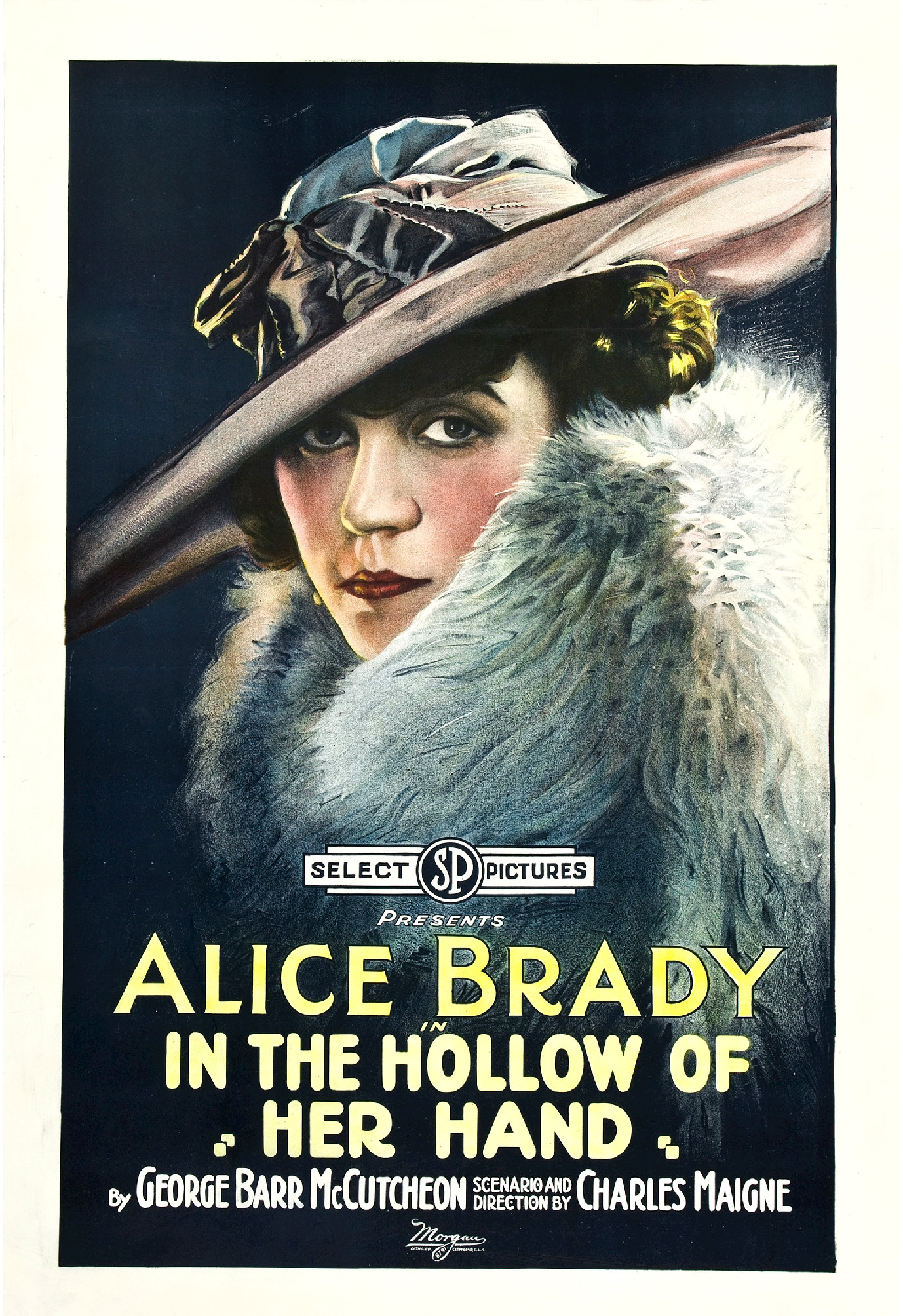
- Film poster
- Directed by: Charles Maigne
- Written by: Charles Maigne
- Based on: In the Hollow of Her Hand by George Barr McCutcheon
- Produced by: Select Pictures
- Starring: Alice Brady
- Cinematography: Leo Rossi
- Distributed by: Select Pictures
- Release date: December 1918
- Running time: 5 reels
- Country: United States
- Language: Silent (English intertitles)

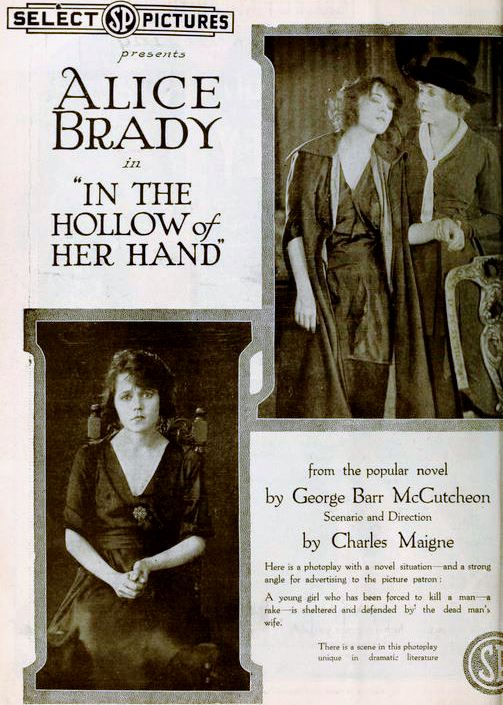
contemporary advert

In the Hollow of Her Hand is a lost 1918 American silent mystery drama film directed by Charles Maigne and starring Alice Brady. It was produced and distributed by the Select Pictures Corporation.

== Cast ==
- Alice Brady as Hetty Castleton
- Myrtle Stedman as Sara Wrandall
- Louise Clark as Mrs. Wrandell
- A.J. Herbert as Leslie Wrandell
- Harold Entwistle as Mr. Wrandell Sr.
- Percy Marmont as Brandon Booth
