= The Copperhead =

1920 film by Charles Maigne

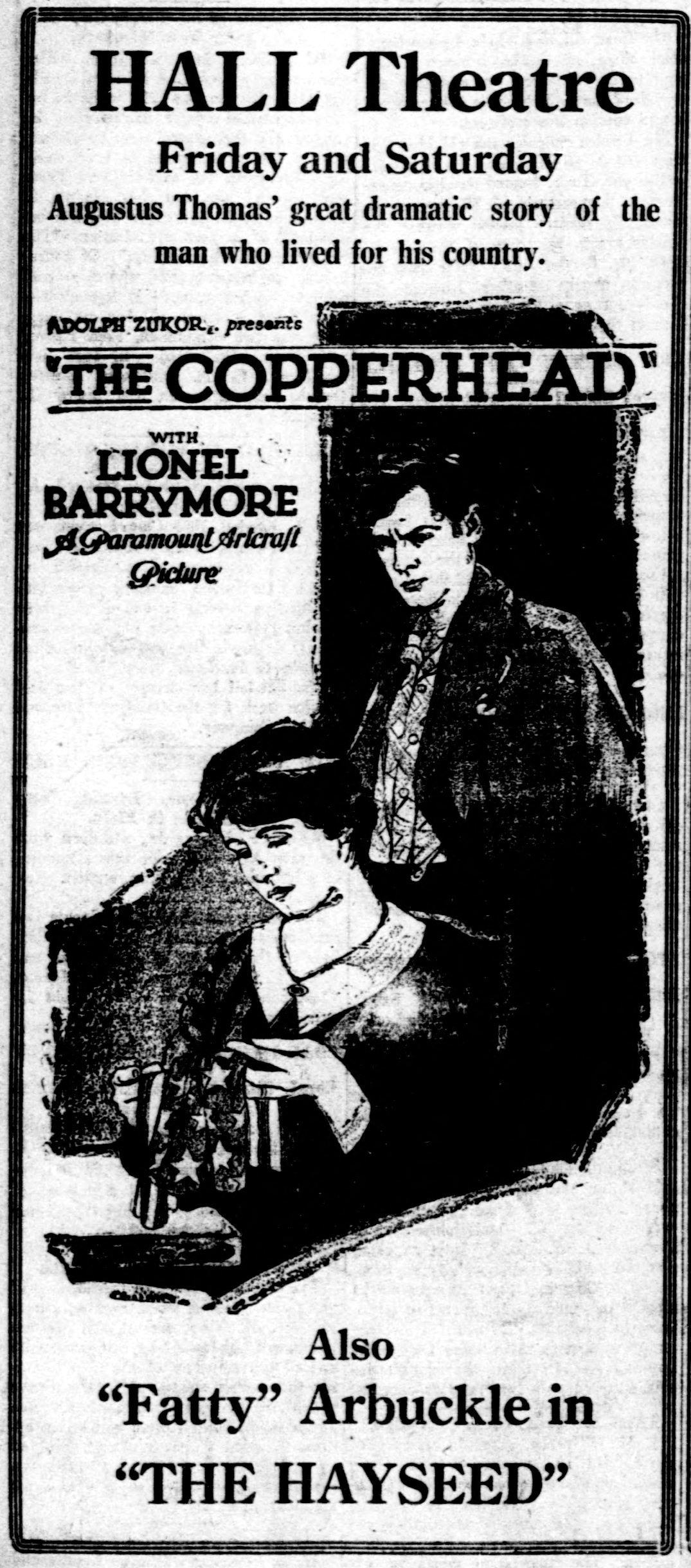
- Newspaper advertisement
- Directed by: Charles Maigne
- Written by: Augustus Thomas (play); Charles Maigne (scenario)
- Based on: The Glory of His Country by Frederick Landis
- Produced by: Adolph Zukor; Jesse Lasky
- Starring: Lionel Barrymore; Doris Rankin
- Cinematography: Faxon M. Dean
- Distributed by: Paramount Pictures
- Release date: January 25, 1920
- Running time: 7 reels; 6,351 feet
- Country: United States
- Language: Silent (English intertitles)

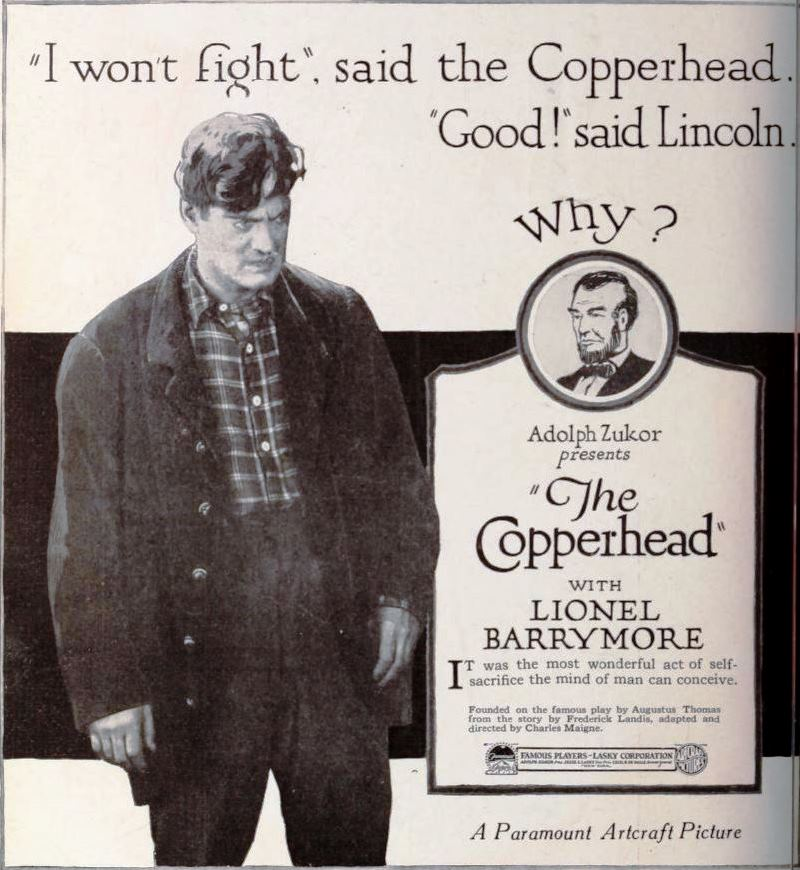
1920 print advertisement for film

The Copperhead is a 1920 American silent historical drama film based on a novel by Frederick Landis and the 1918 play by Augustus Thomas adapted from it. The star of this film is Lionel Barrymore who won acclaim in the play version on Broadway, and who appeared in the play and this film with his first wife Doris Rankin. A print of this film has been screened in recent years.

== Plot ==
At the beginning of the American Civil War Milt Shanks, who owns a farm in Illinois, is asked by President Abraham Lincoln to join the Copperheads, a clandestine quasi-political organization whose sentiments lie with the South. His family and friends unknowing of his mission call him a traitor.

His son later dies in a Civil War battle and his wife dies of heartbreak over the son's death. Shanks spends decades keeping silent about his involvement with the Copperheads until his granddaughter prepares to marry and he's forced to come clean about being involved in a secret Civil War Mission. With this understanding friends and family forgive him.

== Cast ==
- Lionel Barrymore as Milt Shanks
- William P. Carleton as Lt. Tom Hardy
- Francis Joyner as Newt Gillespie (billed as Frank Joyner)
- Richard Carlyle as Lem Tollard
- Arthur Rankin as Joey
- Leslie Stowe as Brother Andrew
- Nicholas Schroell as Abraham Lincoln
- William David as Tom Hardy
- Harry Bartlett as Dr. James
- Jack Ridgeway as Theodore Roosevelt
- Mayor N.M. Cartmell as Captain Mercer
- Doris Rankin as Mrs. Shanks
- Carolyn Lee as Grandma Perley
- Anne Cornwall as Madeline
- Francis Haldorn as Elsie

== Preservation ==
The film survives. It is available on DVD from at least one online source.

== See also ==
- List of films and television shows about the American Civil War
- Lionel Barrymore filmography
