= The Arizona Express =

1924 film

Arizona Express
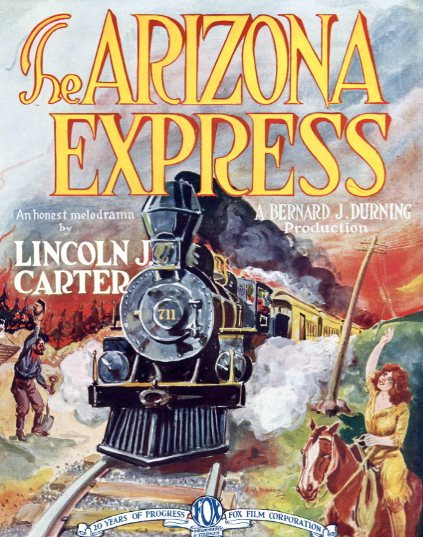
- Advertisement
- Directed by: Tom Buckingham
- Written by: Lincoln J. Carter; Frederick J. Jackson
- Starring: Pauline Starke; Evelyn Brent
- Cinematography: Blake Wagner
- Distributed by: Fox Film Corp.
- Release date: March 23, 1924
- Running time: 82 minutes (7 reels)
- Country: United States
- Language: Silent (English intertitles)

The Arizona Express is a 1924 American silent crime drama film directed by Tom Buckingham and starring Pauline Starke and Evelyn Brent.

== Plot ==
The Arizona Express (1924)

As described in a film magazine review, David Keith, although engaged to a young woman of the town, comes to love Lola Nichols, a cabaret dancer who pretends to love him in order to obtain information on the layout of a bank that she and her gang intend to rob. When Keith's uncle discovers the plan, he is killed by one of the woman's confederates. Keith is accused of the murder and sent to prison. Just a few minutes before he is set to be executed, he is pardoned by the governor through the efforts of his sister Katherine and her sweetheart Steve, who have secured evidence that establishes his innocence.

== Cast ==
- Pauline Starke as Katherine Keith
- Evelyn Brent as Lola Nichols
- Anne Cornwall as Florence Brown
- Harold Goodwin as David Keith
- David Butler as Steve Butler
- Francis McDonald as Victor Johnson
- Frank Beal as Judge Ashton
- William Humphrey as Henry MacFarlane
- Otto Hoffman as Desk Clerk (uncredited)
- Bud Jamison as Thug Driver (uncredited)
- Sherwood Mertz (Undetermined Secondary Role, uncredited)

== Preservation ==
Prints of The Arizona Express survive in the Museum of Modern Art.

== Bibliography ==
- Solomon, Aubrey. The Fox Film Corporation, 1915-1935: A History and Filmography. McFarland, 2011. ISBN 978-0-7864-6286-5
