= The Seventh Day (1922 film) =

1922 film by Henry King

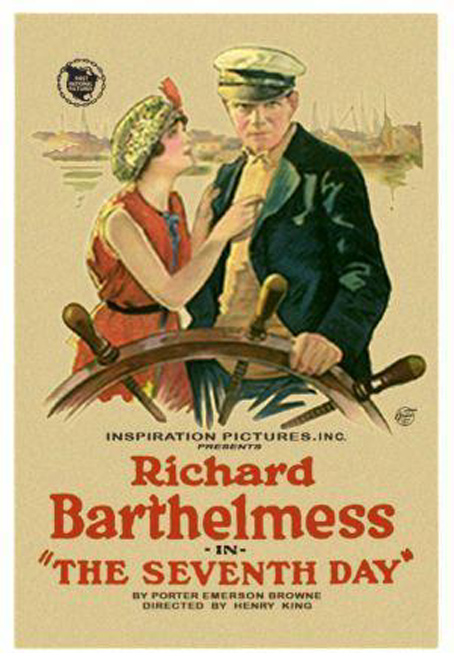
- Directed by: Henry King
- Written by: Porter Emerson Browne; Edmund Goulding
- Produced by: Henry King
- Starring: Richard Barthelmess; Louise Huff; Frank Losee; Anne Cornwall
- Cinematography: Henry Cronjager
- Edited by: Duncan Mansfield
- Production company: First National Pictures
- Distributed by: First National Pictures
- Release date: February 6, 1922
- Running time: 60 minutes
- Country: United States
- Language: Silent (English intertitles)

The Seventh Day is a 1922 American silent drama film directed by Henry King and starring Richard Barthelmess, Louise Huff, Frank Losee and Anne Cornwall. A group of high society New Yorkers on a yachting vacation put into a small New England fishing village for repairs. While there they strike up relationships with locals that threaten the harmony of their party.

Location shooting took place at New Harbor in Maine.

== Plot ==
As described in a film magazine, John Alden Jr. returns to the small fishing village where he had grownup with his two old uncles, a spinster aunt, and his sister Betty. The old men tell him that they are going "into dry dock" and that he is to take command of the fishing boat the next time it leaves. That same day a yacht with a gay party of irresponsible young people aboard limps into the village harbor with bad pumps. John is at once attracted by the pretty Patricia Vane while his sister is not averse to the admiration of Reggie Van Zandt. Patricia wickedly entices the young rustic, but finds that she is playing with fire as her heart goes out to John while she is engaged to Reggie. Sunday, the seventh day, finds the merry crowd aboard the yacht playing "put and take" while John, Betty, their elderly relatives, and the "hired girl" are getting ready for church. Patricia and one of the crowd from the yacht go ashore to get some supplies and she is enticed to go to church, which is a novel experience for her. John takes her back in a row boat. Later, he calls on her in a motorboat and tells her that he loves her. It is then that he learns that she is engaged to Reggie. Disillusioned and hurt, he is told by Donald Peabody that Reggie has taken Betty aboard the yacht. John goes for his sister, knocking down Reggie when he objects. Reggie and Patricia decide to end their engagement, and Reggie manfully telling Betty of his love for her. At the end of the film Patricia is going to John.

== Cast ==
- Richard Barthelmess as John Alden Jr
- Louise Huff as Patricia Vane
- Frank Losee as Uncle Jim Alden
- Leslie Stowe as Uncle Ned
- Tammany Young as Donald Peabody
- George Stewart as Reggie Van Zandt
- Alfred Schmid as Monty Pell
- Grace Barton as Aunt Abigail
- Anne Cornwall as Betty Alden
- Patterson Dial as Katinka
- Teddie Gerard as 'Billie' Blair

== Bibliography ==
- Matthew Kennedy. Edmund Goulding's Dark Victory: Hollywood's Genius Bad Boy. Terrace Books, 2004.
