= The Flaming Frontier =

1926 film directed by Edward Sedgwick

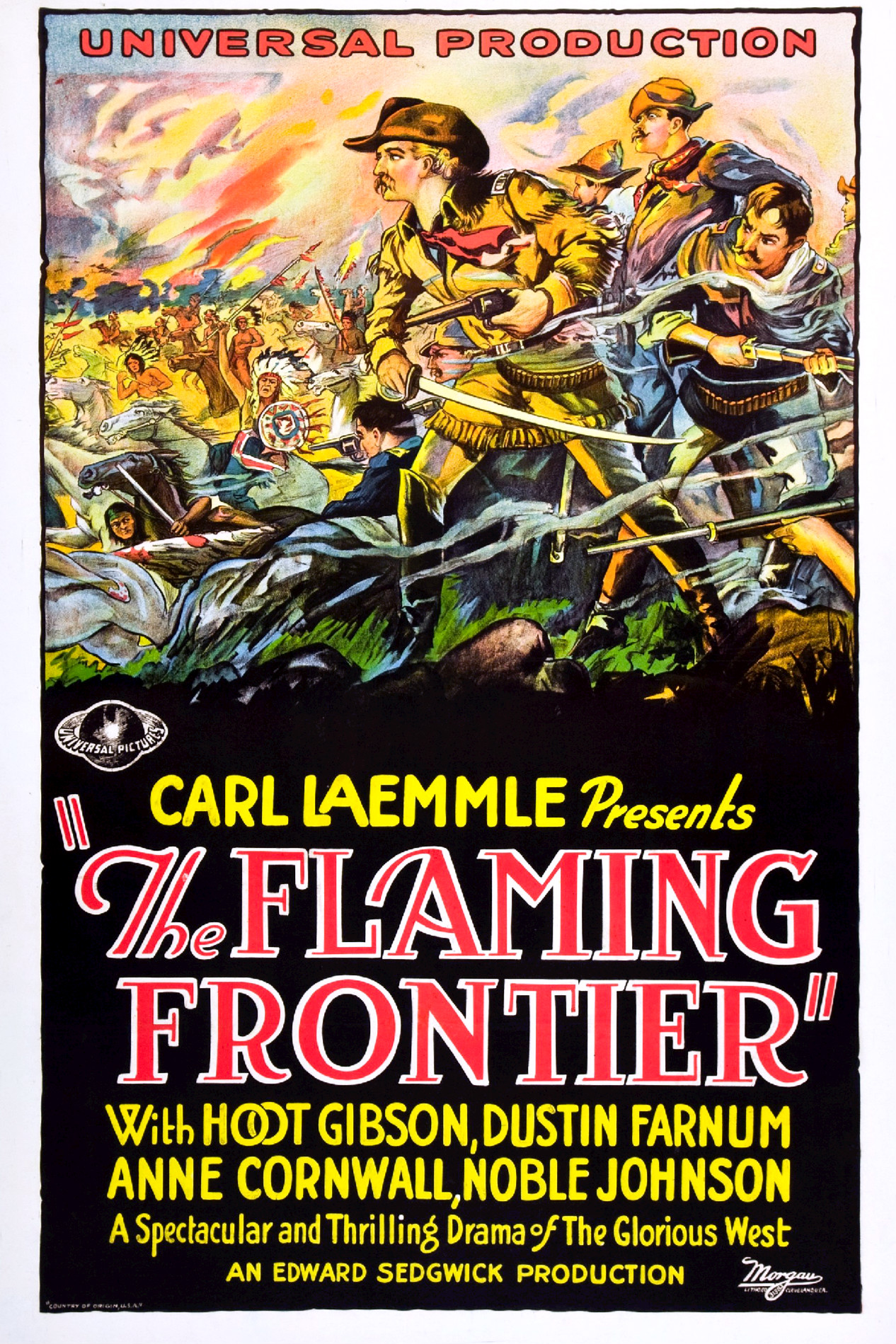
- Film poster
- Directed by: Edward Sedgwick
- Written by: Edward J. Montagne; Charles Kenyon; Raymond L. Schrock; Edward Sedgwick
- Produced by: Carl Laemmle
- Starring: Hoot Gibson
- Cinematography: Virgil Miller
- Distributed by: Universal Pictures
- Release date: September 12, 1926
- Running time: 9 reels
- Country: United States
- Language: Silent (English intertitles)

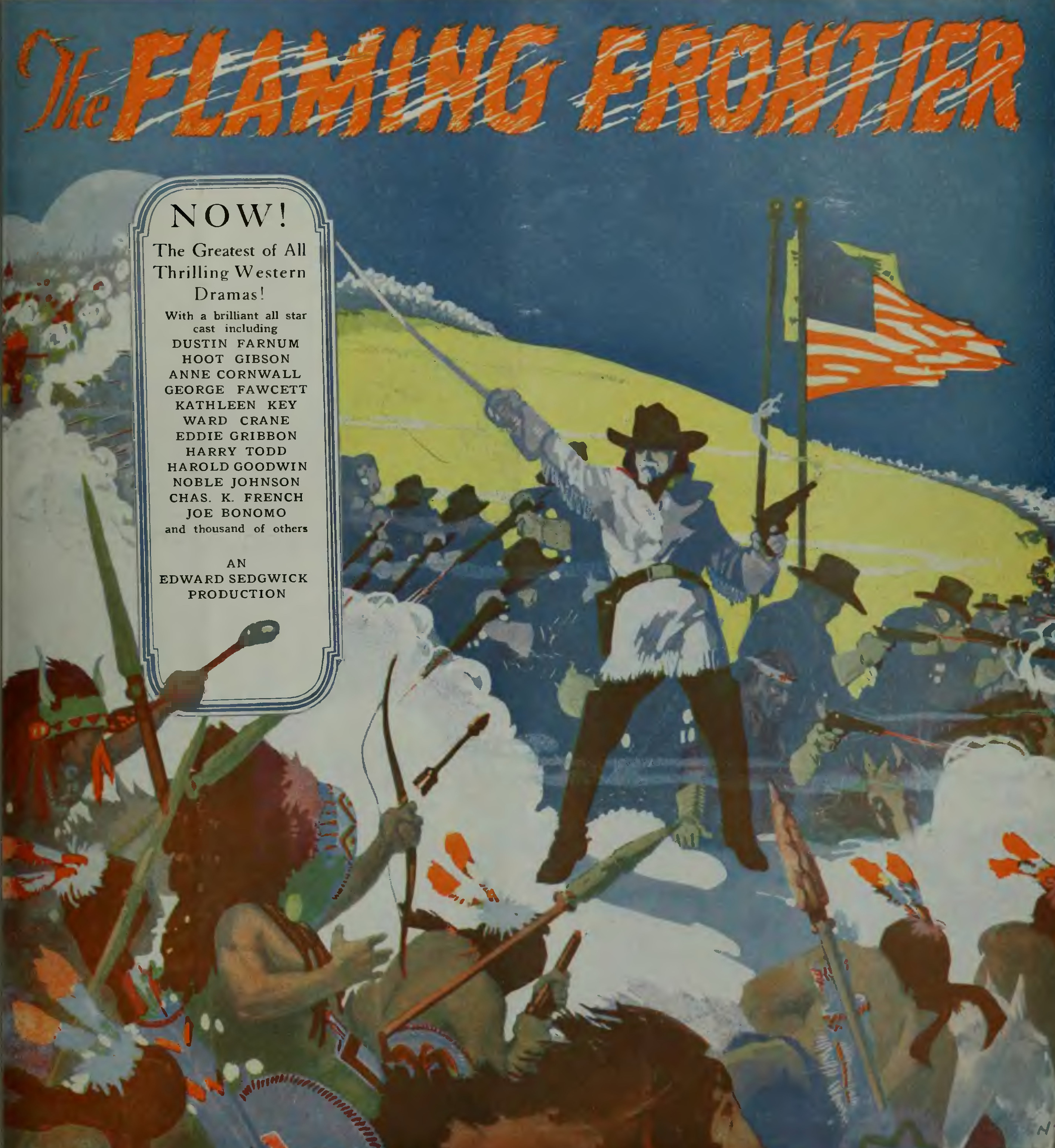
The Flaming Frontier ad in The Film Daily, 1926

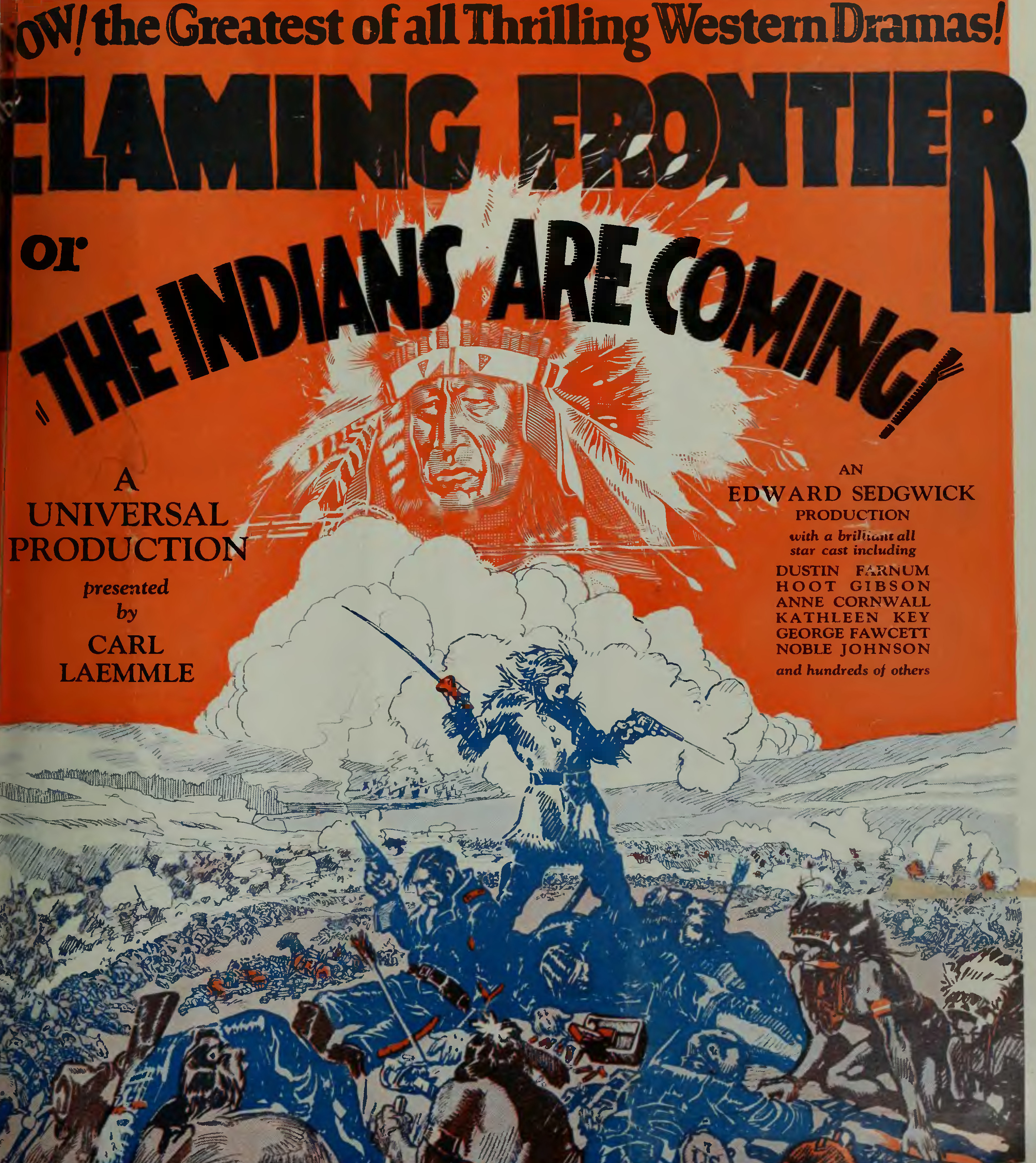
1926 ad

The Flaming Frontier is a 1926 American silent Western film directed by Edward Sedgwick and starring Hoot Gibson. It was produced and distributed by Universal Pictures.

== Plot ==
As described in a film magazine review, General Custer, who is trying to bring peace in the West of 1876, is aided by Senator Stanwood. Plotters have the son of the Senator involved with a young woman in order to have the Senator removed as an obstacle. Bob Langdon, young cadet at West Point and a friend of the Senator, takes the blame, is expelled, and joins Custer's army. The army, misled as to the size of the Indian force, attacks them and the troops are slaughtered in Battle of the Little Bighorn. Bob, however, survives as he had been sent to obtain reinforcements.

== Cast ==
- Hoot Gibson as Bob Langdon
- Anne Cornwall as Betty Stanwood
- Dustin Farnum as General Custer
- Ward Crane as Sam Belden
- Kathleen Key as Lucretia
- Eddie Gribbon as Jonesy
- Harry Todd as California Joe
- Harold Goodwin as Lawrence Stanwood
- George Fawcett as Senator Stanwood
- Noble Johnson as Sitting Bull
- Charles K. French as Senator Hargess
- William Steele as Penfield
- Walter Rodgers as President Grant
- Ed Wilson as Grant's Secretary
- Joe Bonomo as Rain in the Face

== Preservation ==
The film survives in an incomplete and / or abridged form. Footage involving a raid on a wagon train was used as stock footage in the serial The Indians Are Coming (1930).
