= Harold Goodwin (American actor) =

American actor

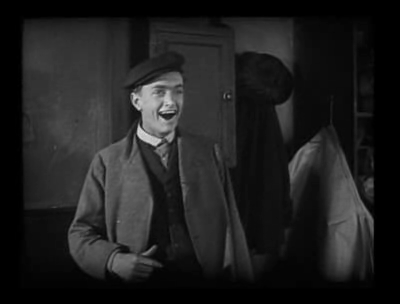
- Still of Goodwin from Suds (1920)
- Born: December 1, 1902; Peoria, Illinois
- Died: July 12, 1987 (aged 84); Woodland Hills, California
- Years active: 1915–1973

Harold Goodwin (December 1, 1902 – July 12, 1987) was an American actor who performed in over 225 films.

== Biography ==
Goodwin began his film career at age 12.

Goodwin's first starring role came in Oliver Twist, Jr. (1921). He also appeared as Jeff Brown in the 1927 Buster Keaton comedy College. It was an athletic role the 6-foot-2 Goodwin got after a perfunctory interview with Keaton. "He says, 'Do you play ball?' I said, 'Yeah. I used to play at school,' He says, 'You'll do.' "

He followed up with a role in another Keaton film The Cameraman in 1928, opposite Keaton and actress Marceline Day. Goodwin worked steadily through the silent film era and transitioned into the talkie era as a character actor, often as a "tough guy" because of his athletic stature. He was seen in the role of Detering in the 1930 Lewis Milestone-directed World War I drama All Quiet on the Western Front. His subsequent film roles were mostly small and uncredited.

In his later years Goodwin mainly acted in the Western film genre and often worked as a stuntman for film studios. In the 1960s, he made many guest appearances on the NBC television series Daniel Boone, starring Fess Parker and Ed Ames. Goodwin made his last film appearance in the low-budget horror film The Boy Who Cried Werewolf (1973) before retiring from the film industry and eventually working in real estate. In fact, as a longtime friend and frequent collaborator of Buster Keaton’s, Goodwin was the agent who found and sold Keaton his final, cherished home in the same Woodland Hills area where they both resided.

== Selected filmography ==
- The Ever Living Isles (1915, Short) – Wesley Hafley
- Old Heidelberg (1915) – Prince Karl, Age 12
- Little Miss Nobody (1916)
- The Sawdust Ring (1917) – Peter Weldon
- The Silent Man (1917) – David Bryce
- The Yellow Dog (1918)
- Set Free (1918) – Ronald Blair
- The Winning Girl (1919) – Jack Milligan
- Puppy Love (1919) – James Gordon Oliver
- Heart o' the Hills (1919) – Young Jason Honeycutt
- Suds (1920) – Benjamin Pillsbury Jones
- The Family Honor (1920) – The Grocer Boy
- Overland Red (1920) – Collie
- You Never Can Tell (1920) – Jimmy Flannery
- Sweet Lavender (1920) – Clem Hale
- Oliver Twist, Jr. (1921) – Oliver Twist Jr.
- Hearts of Youth (1921) – Ishmael Worth
- Lovetime (1921) – Pierre Lavone
- The Rosary (1922) – Skeeters Martin
- Tracked to Earth (1922) – Dick Jones
- Man to Man (1922) – Slim Barbee
- The Bearcat (1922) – Peter May
- Seeing's Believing (1922) – Hack Webster
- Kissed (1922) – Jim Kernochan
- The Bootlegger's Daughter (1922) – Violinist
- The Flirt (1922) – Jimmy Madison
- Kindled Courage (1923) – Hugh Paxton
- Alice Adams (1923) – Walter Adorns
- Burning Words (1923) – Ross Darby
- Broadway Gold (1923) – Page Poole
- The Ramblin' Kid (1923) – Skinny Rawlins
- The Wanters (1923) – Chauffeur
- Gentle Julia (1923) – Noble Dill
- Arizona Express (1924) – David Keith
- Hit and Run (1924) – Tex Adams
- That French Lady (1924) – Charlie Abbey
- Madonna of the Streets (1924) – Walter Bowman
- In Love with Love (1924) – Robert Metcalf
- Riders of the Purple Sage (1925) – Bern Venters
- The Talker (1925) – Lonnie Whinston
- The Midshipman (1925) – Tex
- Secret Orders (1926) – Eddie Delano
- The Flaming Frontier (1926) – Lawrence Stanwood
- The Honeymoon Express (1926) – Lance
- The Better 'Ole (1926) – Bert Chester – British Secret Service
- When a Dog Loves (1927) – James Alston
- Tarzan and the Golden Lion (1927) – Jack Bradley
- Snowbound (1927) – Joe Baird
- College (1927) – A Rival
- The Cheer Leader (1928) – Richard Crosby
- Her Summer Hero (1928) – Herb Darrow
- The Cameraman (1928) – Stagg
- The Divine Lady (1929) – Coach Driver who Kisses Emma (uncredited)
- Flight (1929) – Steve Roberts
- All Quiet on the Western Front (1930) – Detering
- The Widow from Chicago (1930) – Jimmy Henderson
- Dirigible (1930) – Hansen
- The Lawyer's Secret (1931) – 'Madame X'
- Pleasure (1931) – Lloyd
- Graft (1931) – 'Speed' Hansen
- Bad Company (1931) – Conway – Gangster (uncredited)
- Symphony of Six Million (1932) – Intern at Hospital (uncredited)
- Sky Bride (1932) – Wild Bill Adams
- Movie Crazy (1932) – Miller
- Hat Check Girl (1932) – Walter Marsh (uncredited)
- Hallelujah, I'm a Bum (1933) – Len (uncredited)
- Broadway Bad (1933) – A Reporter (uncredited)
- The Story of Temple Drake (1933) – Second Jellybean / Rejected Suitor (uncredited)
- The Girl in 419 (1933) – Doctor (uncredited)
- Strawberry Roan (1933) – Bart Hawkins
- Lone Cowboy (1933) – Hotel Clerk (uncredited)
- Smoking Guns (1934) – Hank Stone
- She Was a Lady (1934) – Yank
- Wagon Wheels (1934) – Nancy's Brother (uncredited)
- Romance in Manhattan (1935) – Doctor at Police Station (uncredited)
- Western Frontier (1935) – Morgan – Replaced by Beaumon
- The Crusades (1935) – Wounded Soldier (uncredited)
- Condemned to Live (1935) – Villager (uncredited)
- It's Up to You (1936) – Salesman
- The Dark Hour (1936) – Peter Blake
- Robin Hood of El Dorado (1936) – Slocum (uncredited)
- Roaming Lady (1936) – Reid's Pilot
- Counterfeit (1936) – Busch (uncredited)
- Theodora Goes Wild (1936) – Photographer at Governor's Reception (uncredited)
- Outcast (1937) – Party Guest (uncredited)
- A Fight to the Finish (1937) – Henry
- It Happened in Hollywood (1937) – Buck
- Love Takes Flight (1937) – Skipper (uncredited)
- Breakfast for Two (1937) – Joe – Blair's Chauffeur (uncredited)
- She Married an Artist (1937) – Reporter (uncredited)
- City Girl (1938) – Chaney's Aide (uncredited)
- Change of Heart (1938) – Caddy Master (uncredited)
- Happy Landing (1938) – Newspaper Reporter (uncredited)
- Start Cheering (1938) – Assistant Director (uncredited)
- Island in the Sky (1938) – Swede – Doyle's Henchman (uncredited)
- Kentucky Moonshine (1938) – Reporter (uncredited)
- Alexander's Ragtime Band (1938) – Military Policeman at Army Show (uncredited)
- One Wild Night (1938) – Newspaper Reporter (uncredited)
- Speed to Burn (1938) – Mug (uncredited)
- Always Goodbye (1938) – Chauffeur (uncredited)
- Sky Giant (1938) – Thompson's Partner (uncredited)
- Keep Smiling (1938) – Taxi Driver (uncredited)
- My Lucky Star (1938) – Cameraman
- Hold That Co-ed (1938) – News Photographer (uncredited)
- Just Around the Corner (1938) – Reporter (uncredited)
- Sharpshooters (1938) – Steward (uncredited)
- Road Demon (1938) – Louie – a Trucker (uncredited)
- While New York Sleeps (1938) – Harold – Reporter (uncredited)
- Jesse James (1939) – Bill
- Mr. Moto's Last Warning (1939) – Nightclub Bouncer / Seaman (uncredited)
- Mr. Moto in Danger Island (1939) – Ship Dispatch Officer (uncredited)
- Union Pacific (1939) – Calvin
- Boy Friend (1939) – Matchie Riggs
- Young Mr. Lincoln (1939) – Jeremiah Carter (uncredited)
- The Jones Family in Hollywood (1939)
- Second Fiddle (1939) – Pool Party Photographer (uncredited)
- News Is Made at Night (1939) – Simms (uncredited)
- Charlie Chan at Treasure Island (1939) – Airplane Steward (uncredited)
- Here I Am a Stranger (1939) – Chauffeur (uncredited)
- Hollywood Cavalcade (1939) – Prop Boy (uncredited)
- Pack Up Your Troubles (1939) – American Aviator (uncredited)
- Too Busy to Work (1939) – Raymond
- The Cisco Kid and the Lady (1939) – Barfly (uncredited)
- City of Chance (1940) – Dealer (uncredited)
- The Blue Bird (1940) – Hickory (uncredited)
- High School (1940) – Gangster (uncredited)
- Charlie Chan in Panama (1940) – Military Police Corporal (uncredited)
- Viva Cisco Kid (1940) – Hank Gunther
- Free, Blonde and 21 (1940) – Minor Role (uncredited)
- Shooting High (1940) – 3rd Crook (uncredited)
- Charlie Chan at the Wax Museum (1940) – Edwards
- Ragtime Cowboy Joe (1940) – Cattle Buyer Duncan
- Texas Rangers Ride Again (1940) – Ranger Comstock
- Michael Shayne, Private Detective (1940) – Reporter (uncredited)
- Buck Privates (1941) – Sergeant Leading Recruits Through Train Station (uncredited)
- Sleepers West (1941) – Railroad Detective (uncredited)
- The Cowboy and the Blonde (1941) – Cameraman (uncredited)
- Forced Landing (1941) – Petchnikoff
- Accent on Love (1941) – Policeman (uncredited)
- Tanks a Million (1941) – Lt. Caldwell
- You'll Never Get Rich (1941) – Capt. Nolan (uncredited)
- Great Guns (1941) – Army Captain (uncredited)
- International Lady (1941) – Decoder on Piano (uncredited)
- Cadet Girl (1941) – Sergeant (uncredited)
- Hay Foot (1942) – Lieutenant Caldwell
- Brooklyn Orchid (1942) – Taxi Dispatcher (uncredited)
- Quiet Please, Murder (1942) – Stover (uncredited)
- He Hired the Boss (1943) – Hank (uncredited)
- She Gets Her Man (1945) – Winning Companion (uncredited)
- Salome Where She Danced (1945) – San Francisco Sheriff (uncredited)
- That Night with You (1945) – Robertson – Party Guest (uncredited)
- Frontier Gal (1945) – Deputy (uncredited)
- The Scarlet Horseman (1946, Serial) – Idaho Jones
- The Runaround (1946) – Detective Lund (uncredited)
- Lover Come Back (1946) – Reporter at Party (uncredited)
- Don't Gamble with Strangers (1946) – John Sanders
- Slave Girl (1947) – Captive Sailor (uncredited)
- Ride the Pink Horse (1947) – Red
- Here Comes Trouble (1948) – Reporter with Cigars (uncredited)
- The Bold Frontiersman (1948) – Poker Player #1
- Carson City Raiders (1948) – Dave Starky
- River Lady (1948) – Larson (uncredited)
- Kiss the Blood Off My Hands (1948) – Whipper (uncredited)
- Family Honeymoon (1948) – Guide (uncredited)
- Bad Boy (1949) – Gambler (uncredited)
- The Lady Gambles (1949) – Westerner (uncredited)
- Law of the Golden West (1949) – Northerner in bar
- The Wyoming Bandit (1949) – Sheriff
- Tokyo Joe (1949) – Maj. J.F.X. Loomis (uncredited)
- Radar Patrol vs. Spy King (1949, Serial) – Miller, Power Station Mgr. [Ch. 7]
- Woman in Hiding (1950) – State Trooper (uncredited)
- The Great Rupert (1950) – Callahan – FBI Man
- The Kid from Texas (1950) – Matt Curtis
- The Vanishing Westerner (1950) – Howard Glumm
- I Was a Shoplifter (1950) – San Diego Sheriff (uncredited)
- The Invisible Monster (1950, Serial) – Kirk – Body-Shop Henchman [Ch.11] (uncredited)
- Desperadoes of the West (1950, Serial) – Sheriff (uncredited)
- Wyoming Mail (1950) – Cowboy (uncredited)
- The Misadventures of Buster Keaton (1950) – (uncredited)
- Abbott and Costello Meet the Invisible Man (1951) – Bartender (uncredited)
- The Last Outpost (1951) – Union Sergeant (uncredited)
- Ma and Pa Kettle Back on the Farm (1951) – Train Conductor (uncredited)
- Comin' Round the Mountain (1951) – Mountaineer
- Cattle Drive (1951) – Waiter (uncredited)
- Double Dynamite (1951) – Police Lieutenant (uncredited)
- Here Come the Nelsons (1952) – Minor Role (uncredited)
- The Blazing Forest (1952) – Mac, Injured Lumberjack (uncredited)
- The Redhead from Wyoming (1953) – Chet's Henchman (uncredited)
- Abbott and Costello Go to Mars (1953) – Dr. Coleman (uncredited)
- Ma and Pa Kettle on Vacation (1953) – U.S. Agent Harriman (uncredited)
- Calamity Jane (1953) – Poker Player (uncredited)
- Ride Clear of Diablo (1954) – Bartender (uncredited)
- Black Horse Canyon (1954) – Cowhand (uncredited)
- Black Tuesday (1954) – Fire Commissioner (uncredited)
- Abbott and Costello Meet the Keystone Kops (1955) – Cameraman
- Ma and Pa Kettle at Waikiki (1955) – Dr. Barnes (uncredited)
- Walk the Proud Land (1956) – Telegrapher (uncredited)
- Showdown at Abilene (1956) – Cattleman (uncredited)
- Joe Butterfly (1957) – Colonel Hopper
- Night Passage (1957) – Pick Gannon
- Step Down to Terror (1958) – Man with Dog (uncredited)
- No Name on the Bullet (1959) – Wilson – Bank Clerk (uncredited)
- It Started with a Kiss (1959) – Guard (uncredited)
- The Leech Woman (1960) – Detective Joe (uncredited)
- Portrait in Black (1960) – Patrolman (uncredited)
- Spartacus (1960) – Slave (uncredited)
- Go Naked in the World (1961) – George – the Bartender (uncredited)
- Experiment in Terror (1962) – Truck Driver (uncredited)
- Move Over, Darling (1963) – Bailiff (uncredited)
- The Brass Bottle (1964) – Van Driver (uncredited)
- Shock Treatment (1964) – Library Clerk (uncredited)
- The Comedy Man (1964) – Art Baldwin (uncredited)
- Morituri (1965) – Merchant Marine (uncredited)
- The Boy Who Cried Werewolf (1973) – Mr. Duncan (final film role)

== Bibliography ==
- John Holmstrom, The Moving Picture Boy: An International Encyclopaedia from 1895 to 1995, Norwich, Michael Russell, 1996, p. 20.
- Curtis, James (2022). Buster Keaton: A Filmmaker's Life (1st ed.). New York: Alfred A. Knopf. ISBN 9780385354219.
