= The Widow from Chicago =

1930 film

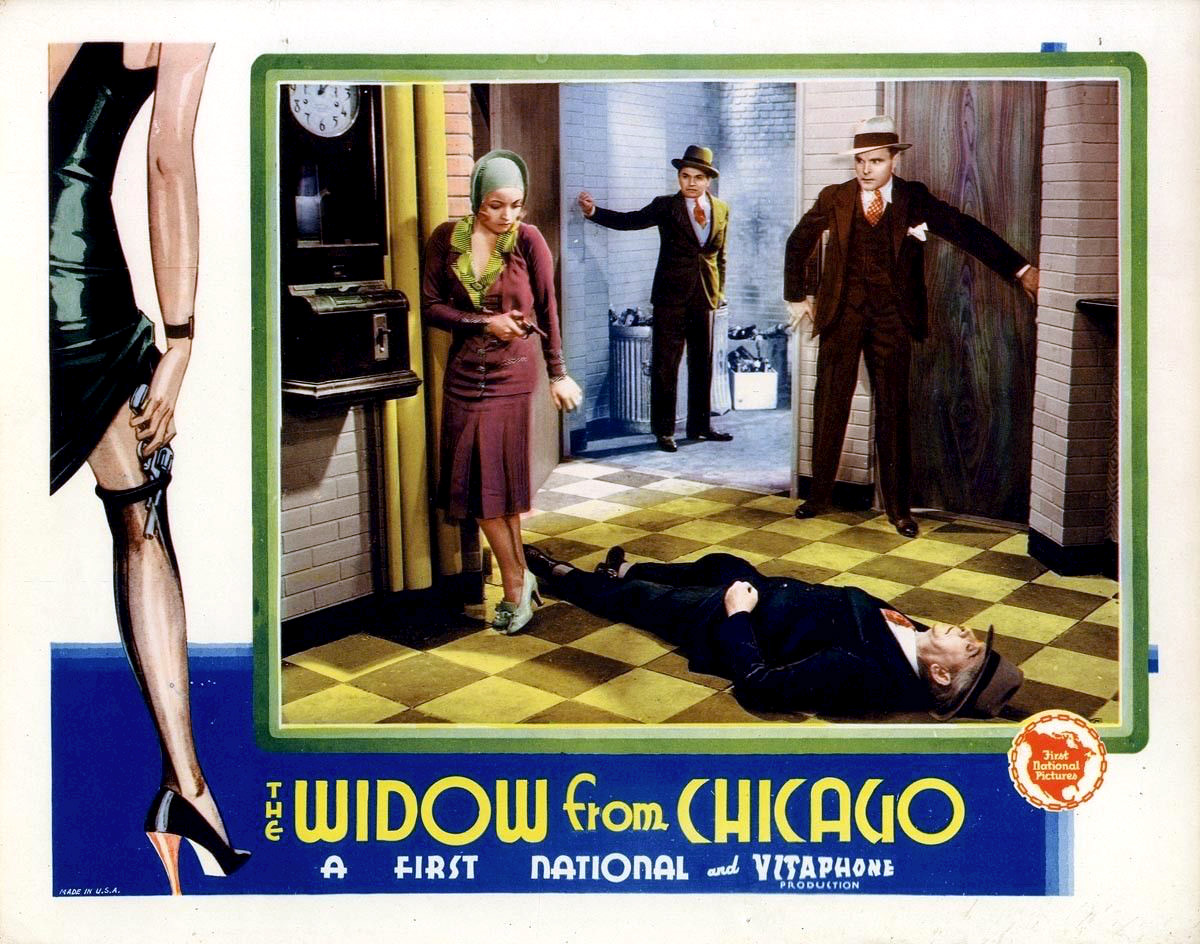
- Theatrical poster
- Directed by: Edward F. Cline
- Written by: Earl Baldwin
- Starring: Alice White; Edward G. Robinson; Neil Hamilton; Frank McHugh
- Cinematography: Sol Polito
- Edited by: Edward Schroeder
- Music by: Leo F. Forbstein; Erno Rapee
- Distributed by: First National Pictures
- Release date: November 23, 1930 (U.S.)
- Running time: 64 minutes
- Country: United States
- Language: English

The Widow from Chicago is a 1930 American pre-Code crime drama film directed by Edward F. Cline and starring Alice White, Edward G. Robinson, Neil Hamilton, and Frank McHugh. It was released by First National Pictures, a subsidiary of Warner Bros. Pictures. Planned as a full-scale musical, the songs were cut from the film before release due to the public's aversion for musicals.

== Plot ==
Two detectives, Finnegan and Jimmy, board a train in pursuit of a gangster, “Swifty” Dorgan. Swifty is traveling to New York to work for Dominic, a notorious gangster who owns a nightclub. Swifty jumps off the train near a bridge crossing and since no trace of him can be found the police believe him to be dead. Jimmy assumes Swifty's identity and joins Dominic's gang but is quickly discovered to be an imposter and shot dead. Determined to find out who killed her brother, Polly poses as Swifty's widow and attempts to get a job at Dominic's nightclub. Swifty eventually shows up and Polly is almost exposed as an imposter. Swifty, however, is eventually persuaded by Polly and he promises not to tell Dominic the truth. Polly and Swifty fall in love. During a hold-up, Polly protects Swifty by shooting at a cop in the back. Swifty begins to think of reforming due to Polly's influence. Polly eventually gets Dominic to confess that he shot her brother by pretending to be interested in him. She leaves the phone off the hook while the police listen in on his confession. When the police show up, Dominic realizes what Polly has done and uses her as a shield against the police but Swifty manages to save her and Dominic is forced to surrender to the police.

== Cast ==
- Alice White as Polly
- Edward G. Robinson as Dominic
- Neil Hamilton as 'Swifty' Dorgan
- Frank McHugh as Slug
- Lee Shumway as Johnston
- Brooks Benedict as Mullins
- John Elliott as Lieutenant Finnegan
- E.H. Calvert as Davis
- Betty Francisco as Helen
- Harold Goodwin as Oscar
- Anne Cornwall as Mazie (no screen credit)

== Preservation ==
A 62-minute version of the film survives and has been broadcast on television and cable. Due to the public's backlash against musicals late in 1930, all of the musical numbers were cut from the film to make it more marketable. These cuts accounts for the short length of the film. The film was advertised as a gangster picture, a genre which had become very popular with the public. The complete musical film was released intact in countries outside the United States where a backlash against musicals never occurred. It is unknown whether a copy of this full version still exists.

== Preservation status ==
A print is preserved in the Library of Congress collection Packard Campus for Audio-Visual Conservation.
