= College (1927 film) =

1927 film

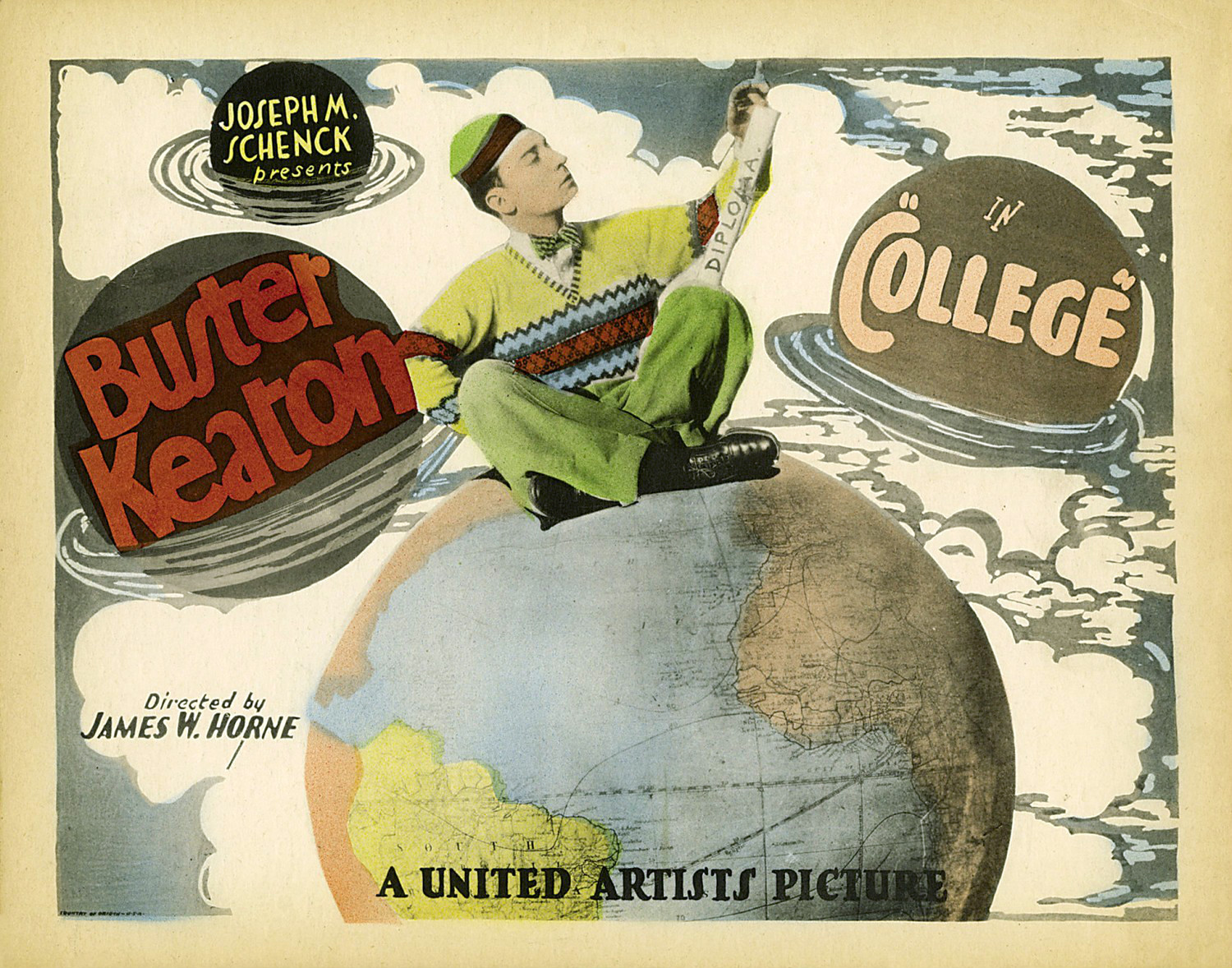
- Theatrical release poster
- Directed by: James W. Horne; Buster Keaton
- Written by: Bryan Foy; Carl Harbaugh
- Produced by: Joseph M. Schenck
- Starring: Buster Keaton; Anne Cornwall; Harold Goodwin
- Cinematography: Bert Haines; Dev Jennings
- Edited by: Sherman Kell
- Distributed by: United Artists
- Release date: September 27, 1927
- Running time: 67 minutes
- Country: United States
- Language: English

College is a 1927 comedy-drama silent film directed by James W. Horne and Buster Keaton, and starring Keaton, Anne Cornwall, and Harold Goodwin.

== Plot ==
College

In Southern California, Ronald graduates high school as its "most brilliant scholar." At his graduation, Ronald speaks on "the Curse of the Athlete," arguing that books are more important than athletics. His speech offends most of the student body, especially the popular athlete Jeff, and causes Ronald's sweetheart Mary to reject him.

Ronald decides to follow Mary to Clayton, which the dean describes as an "athlete-infested college." Hoping to impress Mary, Ronald tries out for the baseball and track and field teams, but proves to be totally inept. At the same time, he attempts to work as a soda jerk and as a waiter in blackface while trying to keep these jobs a secret from Mary, who has started dating Jeff.

Eventually the dean asks Ronald why his grades are suffering. After Ronald explains the situation, the dean empathizes with him and orders the rowing coach to make Ronald the coxswain in the upcoming competition. The coach tries to sabotage Ronald by slipping him a sleeping potion so he cannot compete, but the potion is accidentally consumed by the team's other coxswain instead. Despite Ronald capsizing the boat, pulling the rudder off mid-race, and causing collisions with other boats, the Clayton team wins the race anyway.

Meanwhile, Mary starts to appreciate Ronald’s futile efforts to impress her. However, on the day of the boat race, Jeff gets kicked out of college and takes her hostage in her room, locking them in together in an effort to get her expelled so she will marry him. In the end, she manages to contact Ronald by telephone, who in a sudden show of athleticism sprints to her dormitory, pole vaults into her window, and fights off Jeff by throwing household objects at him and demonstrating skills in javelin, shot put, and tackle football. Mary agrees to marry Ronald and they live the rest of their lives together, ending with a shot of side-by-side gravestones.

== Cast ==
- Buster Keaton as Ronald
- Anne Cornwall as Mary Haynes
- Harold Goodwin as Jeff
- Flora Bramley as Mary's Friend
- Snitz Edwards as Dean Edwards
- Florence Turner as Ronald's Mother
- Carl Harbaugh as Crew Coach
- Sam Crawford as Baseball Coach
- Madame Sul-Te-Wan as Head Cook

== See also ==
- Buster Keaton filmography
- List of films about the sport of athletics
