= The Rainbow Trail (1925 film) =

1925 American silent Western film

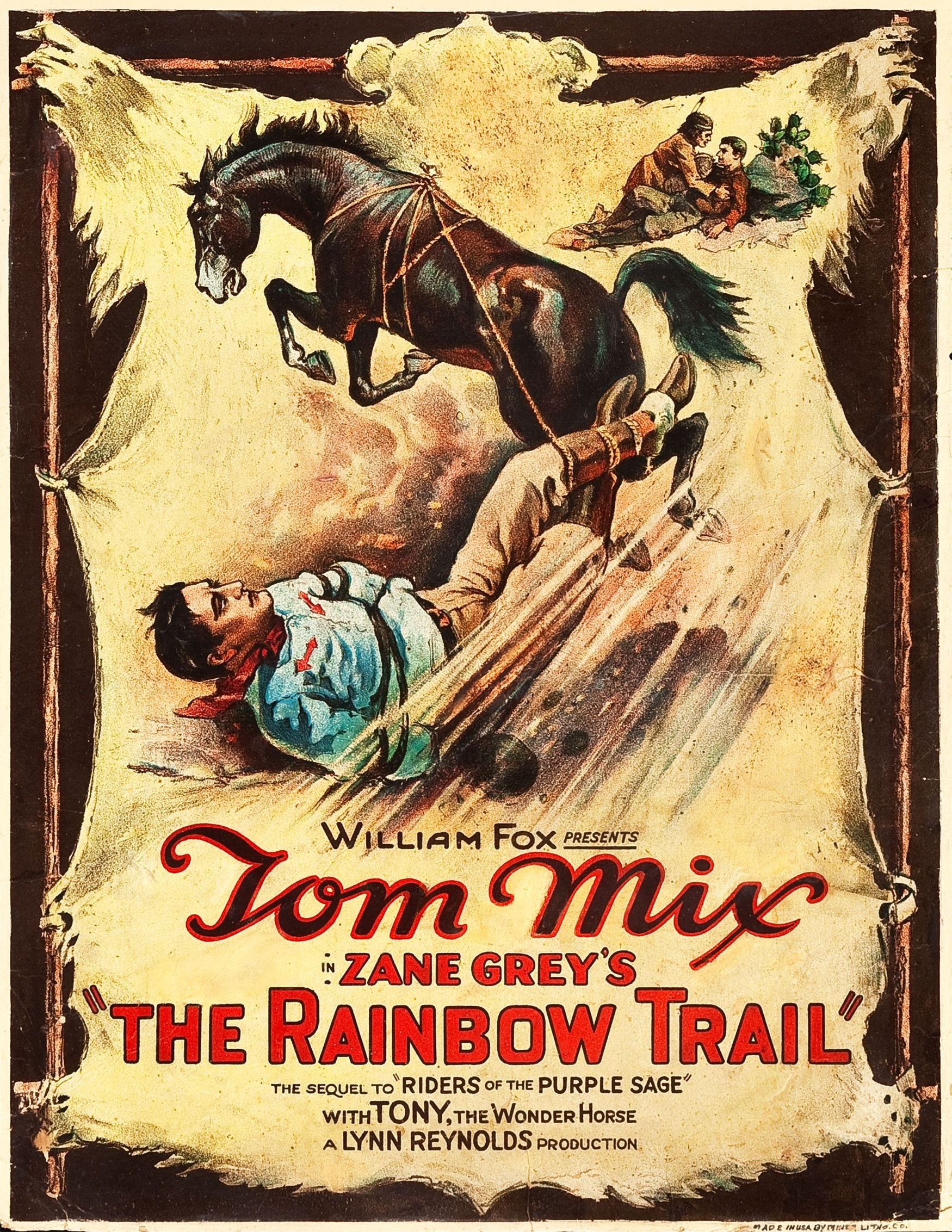
- Directed by: Lynn Reynolds
- Screenplay by: Lynn Reynolds
- Based on: The Rainbow Trail by Zane Grey
- Starring: Tom Mix; Anne Cornwall; George Bancroft; Lucien Littlefield; Mark Hamilton; Vivien Oakland
- Cinematography: Daniel B. Clark
- Production company: Fox Film Corporation
- Distributed by: Fox Film Corporation
- Release date: May 24, 1925
- Running time: 60 minutes
- Country: United States
- Languages: Silent; English intertitles

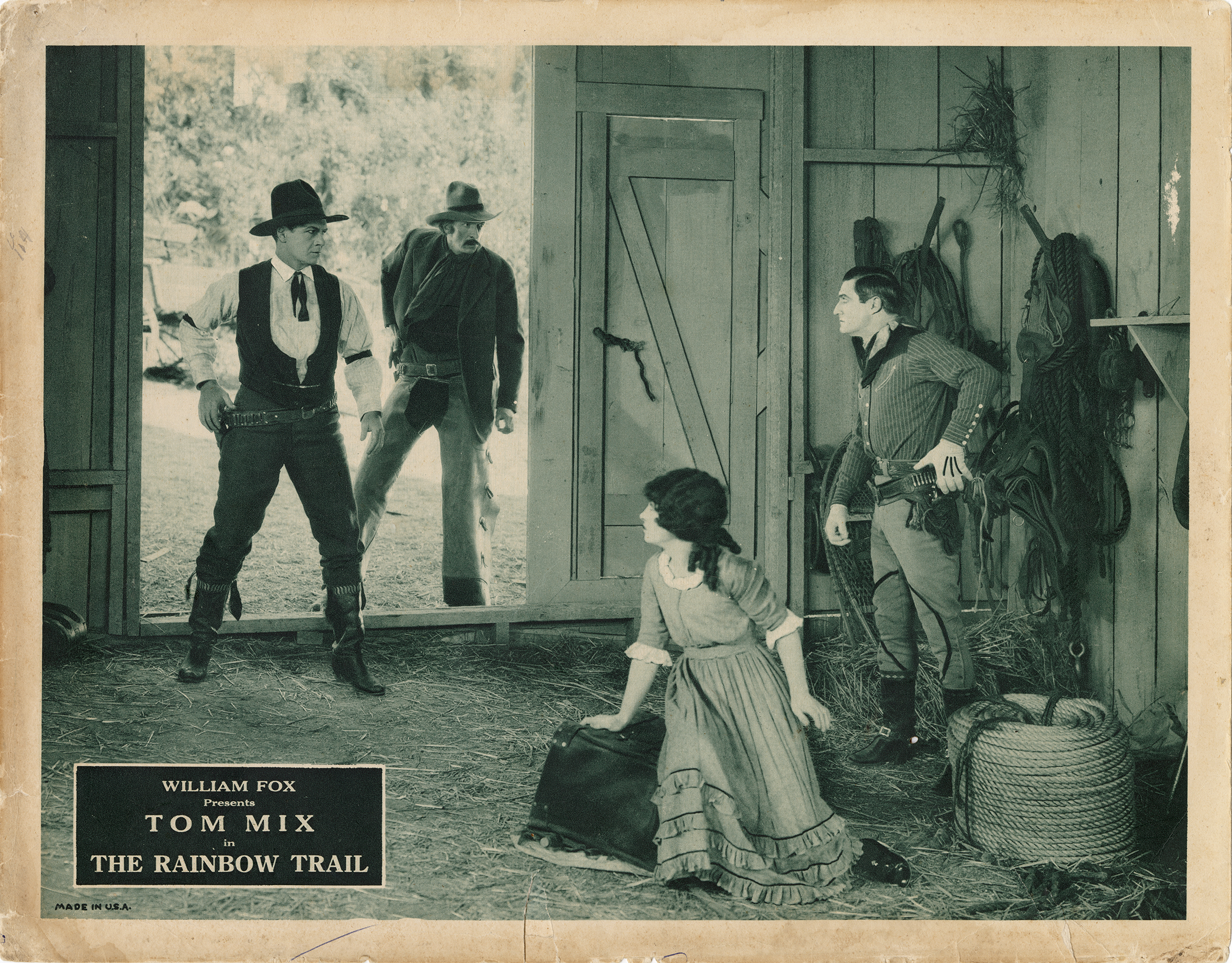
Lobby card

The Rainbow Trail is a 1925 American silent Western film written and directed by Lynn Reynolds. It is based on the 1915 novel The Rainbow Trail by Zane Grey. The film stars Tom Mix, Anne Cornwall, George Bancroft, Lucien Littlefield, Mark Hamilton, and Vivien Oakland. The film was released on May 24, 1925, by Fox Film Corporation.

== Plot ==
As described in a film magazine review, John Shefford has to enter a lawless settlement in order to reach the deep valley imprisoning his uncle and companions. Fighting against heavy odds, he rescues a young woman to save her from a forced marriage.

== Cast ==
- Tom Mix as John Shefford
- Anne Cornwall as Fay Larkin
- George Bancroft as Jake Willets
- Lucien Littlefield as Joe Lake
- Mark Hamilton as Beasley Willets
- Vivien Oakland as Bessie Erne
- Thomas Delmar as Venters
- Fred DeSilva as Shadd
- Steve Clements as Nas Ta Bega
- Doc Roberts as Lassiter
- Carol Holloway as Jane
- Diana Miller as Anne

== Preservation ==
A 35mm print of the film is held by George Eastman House.
