= Under Western Skies (1926 film) =

1926 film directed by Edward Sedgwick

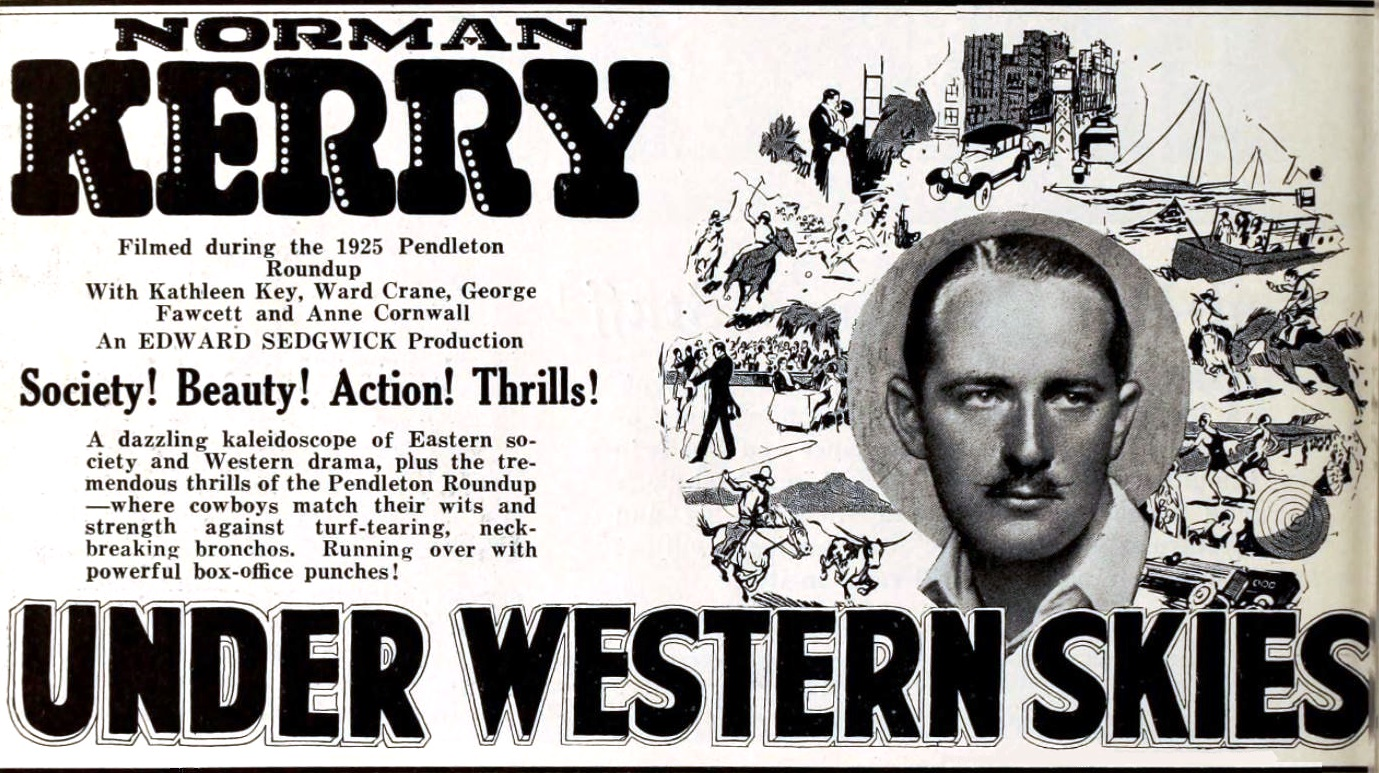
- Advertisement
- Directed by: Edward Sedgwick
- Written by: Edward Sedgwick; Charles E. Whittaker
- Produced by: Carl Laemmle
- Starring: Norman Kerry; Anne Cornwall; Ward Crane
- Cinematography: Virgil Miller
- Production company: Universal Pictures
- Distributed by: Universal Pictures
- Release date: February 7, 1926
- Running time: 70 minutes
- Country: United States
- Languages: Silent; English intertitles

Under Western Skies is a 1926 American silent Western film directed by Edward Sedgwick and starring Norman Kerry, Anne Cornwall, and Ward Crane.

== Plot ==
As described in a film magazine review, Bob Erskine, son of the New York Banker James Erskine, gets acquainted with Sam Parkhurst, an Oregon rancher, and falls in love with his daughter Ella. Later at Pendleton, Oregon, Bob works as a harvest-hand for Sam. A crop failure threatens the area farmers because the eastern bankers, headed by James Erskine, will not advance any of the farmers money. Bob bargains with his father. The father agrees to advance the money to the farmers if Bob wins the steeplechase in the Pendleton rodeo. Bob rides, wins the race, and the effection of Ella.

== Cast ==
- Norman Kerry as Robert Erskine
- Anne Cornwall as Ella Parkhurst
- Ward Crane as Otto Stern
- George Fawcett as James Erskine
- Kathleen Key as Milly Lewis
- Eddie Gribbon as Reed
- Harry Todd as Payne
- Charles K. French as Sam Parkhurst
- William Steele as Fleming
- John S. Peters as Count Andriani
- Artie Ortego as Indian cook

== Production ==
The film uses footage taken for several events taken at the 1925 Pendleton Round-Up in Pendleton, Oregon.

== Preservation ==
With no prints of Under Western Skies located in any film archives, it is a lost film.

== Bibliography ==
- Langman, Larry (1992). A Guide to Silent Westerns. Westport, Connecticut: Greenwood Publishing Group. ISBN 0-313-27858-X.
- Munden, Kenneth White (1997). The American Film Institute Catalog of Motion Pictures Produced in the United States, Part 1. University of California Press. ISBN 0-520-20969-9
