= The Firing Line =

1919 film by Charles Maigne

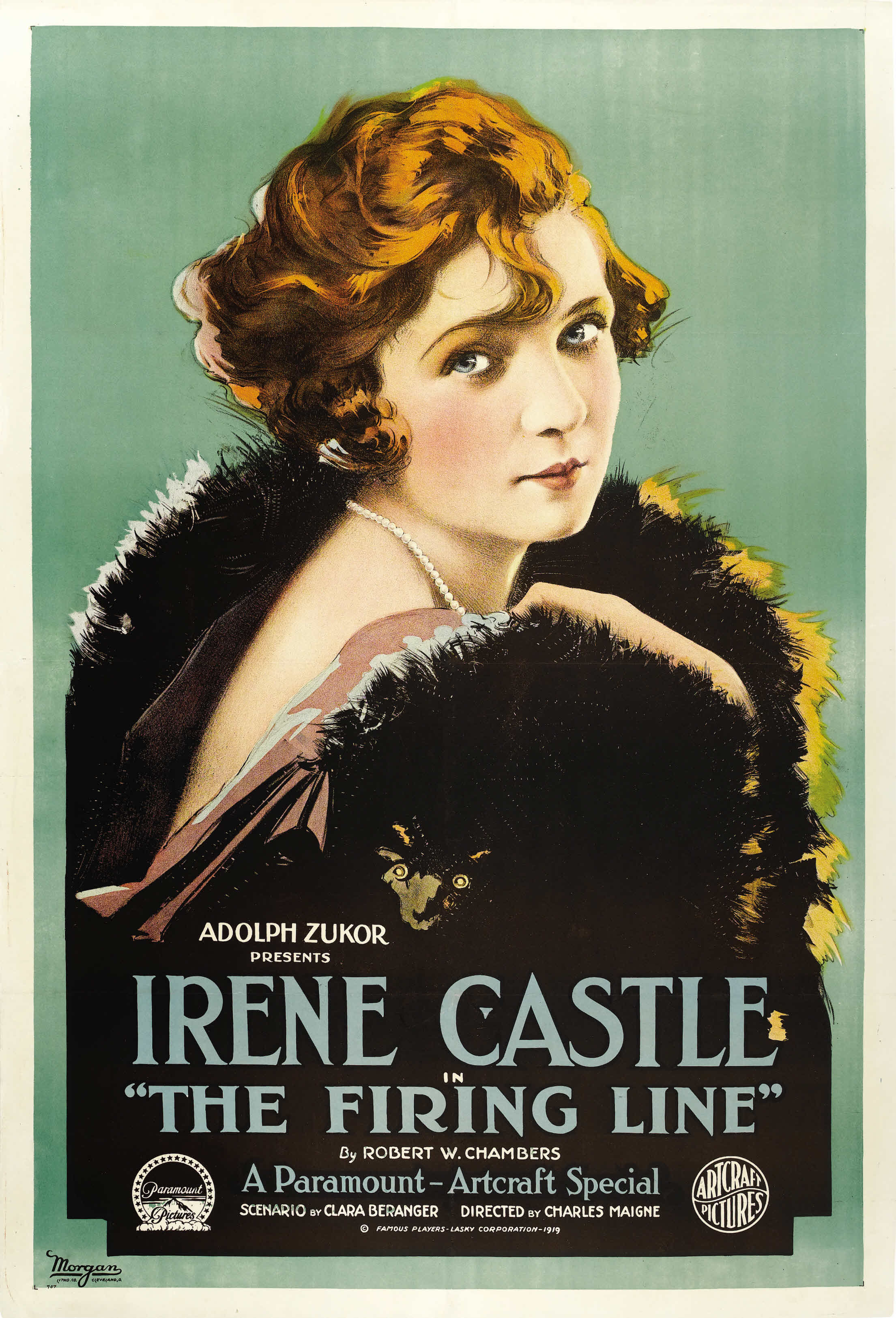
- Lobby poster
- Directed by: Charles Maigne; Robert Schable
- Written by: Clara Beranger
- Based on: The Firing Line by Robert W. Chambers
- Produced by: Adolph Zukor; Jesse Lasky
- Starring: Irene Castle
- Cinematography: Al Liguori
- Distributed by: Paramount Pictures / Artcraft
- Release date: July 6, 1919
- Running time: 6 reels
- Country: United States
- Language: Silent (English intertitles)

The Firing Line is a 1919 American silent drama film directed by Charles Maigne and starring Irene Castle. It was based on the 1908 novel by Robert W. Chambers and produced by Famous Players–Lasky. Paramount Pictures distributed the film.

== Cast ==
- Irene Castle as Sheila Cardross
- Isabel West as Mrs. Cardross
- May Kitson as Constance Paliser
- Anne Cornwall as Cecile Cardross
- Gladys Coburn as Jessie Bradley
- Vernon Steele as John Garrett "Garry" Hamil III (credited as R. Vernon Steele)
- David Powell as Louis Malcourt
- J. H. Gilmore as Neville Cardross
- Frank Losee as James Wayward
- Rudolph de Cordova as One of the Faithful Three
- Charles Craig as One of Faithful Three
- Philip S. Rice as One of Faithful Three
- Robert Schable as William Portlaw
- Jane Warrington as Virginia Suydam
- Shaw Lovett as Gary Cardross

== Reception ==
Variety's review was mostly negative, criticizing the lackluster story for missing "complete effect" and stated that "The pity is that this feature is not better."

== Preservation ==
With no prints of The Firing Line located in any film archives, it is considered a lost film.
