= Prunella (film) =

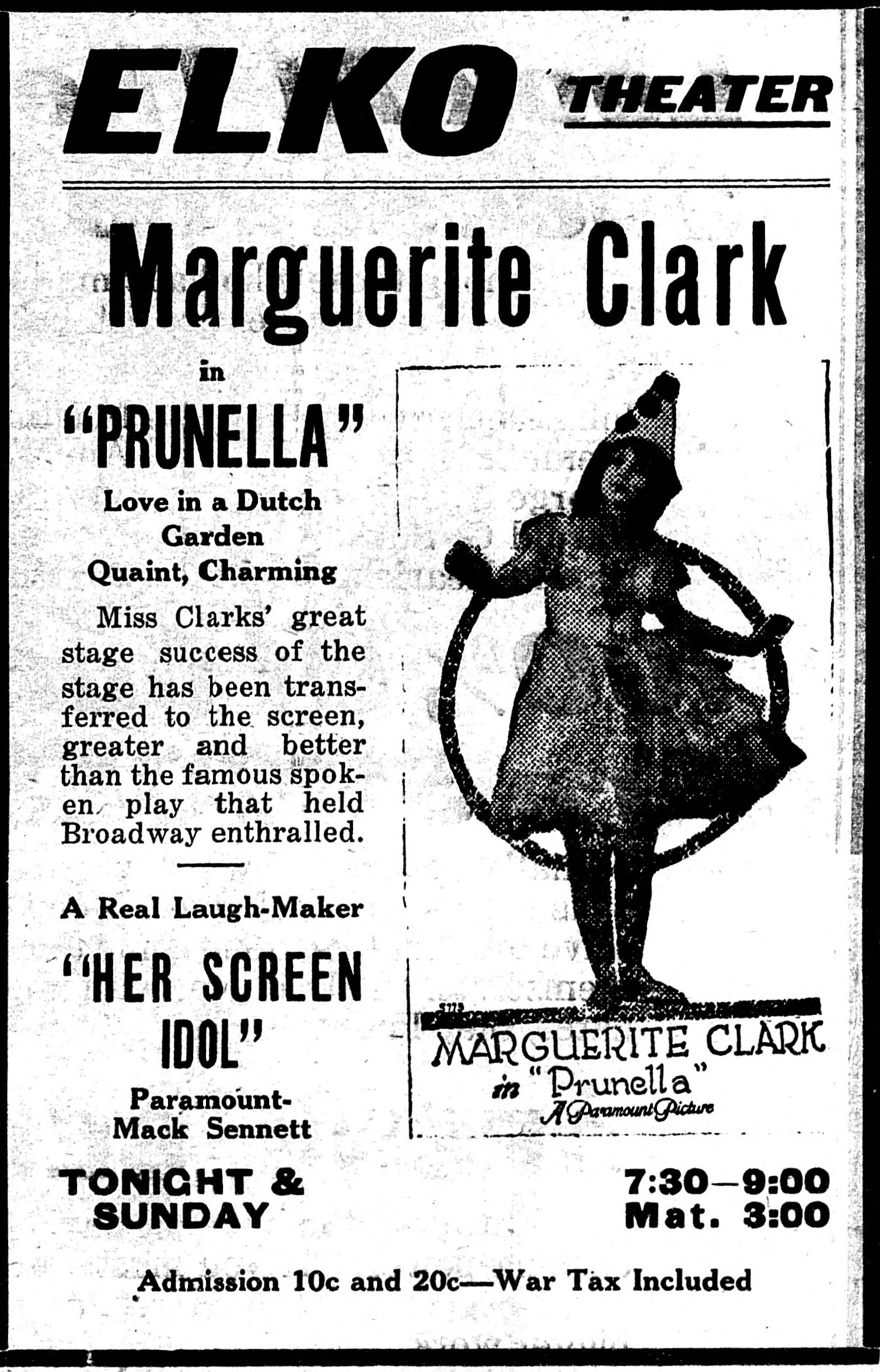
- Newspaper advertisement
- Directed by: Maurice Tourneur
- Written by: Charles Maigne
- Based on: Prunella, or, Love in a Dutch Garden by Granville Barker and Laurence Housman
- Produced by: Adolph Zukor; Jesse Lasky
- Starring: Marguerite Clark
- Cinematography: John van den Broek
- Distributed by: Famous Players–Lasky
- Release date: June 2, 1918
- Running time: 50 minutes
- Country: United States
- Language: Silent (English intertitles)

Prunella is a 1918 American silent romantic fantasy film directed by Maurice Tourneur. The film is based on the 1906 play Prunella, or, Love in a Dutch Garden by Laurence Housman and Harley Granville-Barker, and stars Marguerite Clark in the title role. Clark also starred in the 1913 Winthrop Ames produced Broadway stage production on which the film is based. The majority of the film is considered lost, with only fragments still in existence.

== Plot ==
As described in a film magazine, Prunella, who lives in a garden with her three aunts Prim, Prude and Privacy, is carefully guarded from the outside world until the day a troupe of travelling players comes to town. Pierrot, the leader, creeps into the garden and captivates Prunella's heart. She runs off with him and becomes his Pierrette. For two years they wander from country to country. Pierrot tires of his marriage vows and runs away. He finds what a miserable thing life is without her, and he returns to the Dutch gardens and finds her, is forgiven, and they live on, presumably in blissful happiness.

== Cast ==
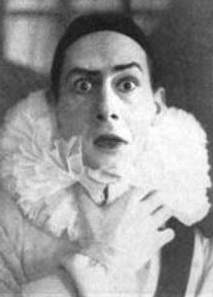
Jules Raucourt as Pierrot

- Marguerite Clark as Prunella
- Isabel Berwin as Prim
- Nora Cecil as Privacy
- William J. Gross as The Gardener
- Marcia Harris as Prude
- Charles Hartley as The Gardener
- Arthur Kennedy as The Gardener's Boy
- Henry Leoni as Scaramel
- Jules Raucourt as Pierrot
- A. Voorhees Wood as The Gardener

== Critical appraisal ==
Film biographer Paul O'Dell in his Griffith and the Rise of Hollywood (1970) commenting on Prunella:

According to literary critic Edward Wagenknecht, Marguerite Clark's best picture was probably Prunella, directed in 1918 by Maurice Tourneur. From the stills available the film looks fascinating, and one cannot agree more with Wagenknecht than there is "no motion picture at present unavailable to students of cinema which would be more important to recover."

Screenwriter DeWitt Bodeen, also commenting on the still photographs from this lost film, reports that "Marguerite Clark's screen image was a compound of whimsicality and frail beauty."

== Sources ==
- O'Dell, Paul (1970). Griffith and the Rise of Hollywood (1970 ed.). New York: A. S. Barnes & Co. p. 163. ISBN 0-498-07718-7.
