= Racing Blood (1926 film) =

1926 film

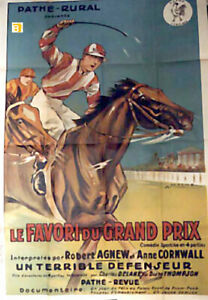
- French poster
- Directed by: Frank Richardson
- Written by: James Bell Smith
- Produced by: Renaud Hoffman; Samuel Sax; Glenn Belt
- Starring: Robert Agnew; Anne Cornwall; John Elliott
- Cinematography: Ray June
- Production company: Gotham Pictures
- Distributed by: Lumas Film Corporation; Stoll Pictures (UK)
- Release date: August 13, 1926
- Running time: 60 minutes
- Country: United States
- Languages: Silent; English intertitles

Racing Blood is a 1926 American silent sports drama film directed by Frank Richardson and starring Robert Agnew, Anne Cornwall and John Elliott.

== Synopsis ==
College student James Fleming discovers that his uncle has gambled away his inheritance on a horse race and then killed himself. Worse it was at the hands of the man whose daughter James is in love with. He goes to work as a journalist and loses touch with her. He acquires a horse, unknowingly the very animal whose victory led to his uncle's downfall. He plans to race it in a steeplechase, but when he is unable to qualify his former girlfriend takes over and rides it to victory before they reconcile.

== Cast ==
- Robert Agnew as James Fleminng
- Anne Cornwall as Muriel Sterlinng
- John Elliott as John Sterling
- Clarence Geldert as Harris Fleming
- Charles Sellon as 'Doc' Morton
- Robert Hale as Jockey Joe Brooks

== Bibliography ==
- Connelly, Robert B. The Silents: Silent Feature Films, 1910–36, Volume 40, Issue 2. December Press, 1998.
- Munden, Kenneth White. The American Film Institute Catalog of Motion Pictures Produced in the United States, Part 1. University of California Press, 1997.
