= Charles Maigne =

American screenwriter (1879–1929)

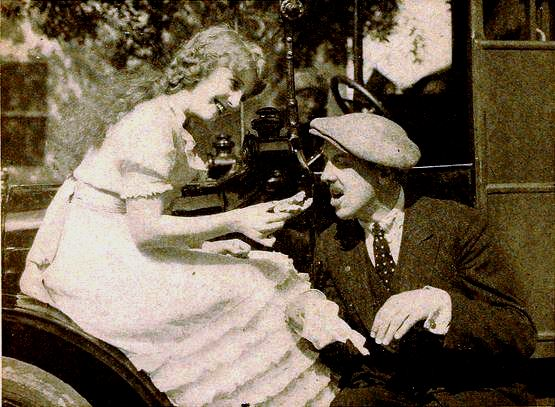
- Actress Mary Miles Minter sharing a hot dog with her director Charles Maigne 1920
- Born: November 11, 1879; Richmond, Virginia, USA
- Died: November 28, 1929 (aged 50); San Francisco, California, USA
- Other name: Charles M. Maigne
- Occupations: Screenwriter, film director
- Years active: 1916-1928

Charles Minnigerode Maigne (November 11, 1879 – November 28, 1929) was an American screenwriter and film director of the silent era. He wrote for 32 films between 1916 and 1928. He also directed 18 films between 1918 and 1923. He was born in Richmond, Virginia and died in San Francisco, California.

== Partial filmography ==
- The Brand of Cowardice (1916) (writer)
- Barbary Sheep (1917) (writer)
- The Rise of Jennie Cushing (1917) (writer)
- Prunella (1918) (writer)
- A Doll's House (1918) (writer)
- Rose of the World (1918)
- The Song of Songs (1918) (writer)
- The Firing Line (1919) (director)
- Redhead (1919) (director)
- The Indestructible Wife (1919) (director)
- The Copperhead (1920) (director)
- The Fighting Chance (1920) (director)
- A Cumberland Romance (1920) (director, writer)
- The Kentuckians (1921) (director)
- Hush Money (1921) (director)
- Received Payment (1922) (director)
- The Cowboy and the Lady (1922) (director)
- Drums of Fate (1923) (director)
- The Silent Partner (1923)
- The Isle of Lost Ships (1923) (writer)
- The Trail of the Lonesome Pine (1923) (director)
- War Paint (1926)
- Lovey Mary (1926) (writer)
