= Clare West (costume designer) =

American fashion designer

- Born: Clara Belle Smith; May 10, 1879; Missouri, U.S.
- Died: March 13, 1961 (aged 81); Ontario, California, U.S.
- Occupation: Costume designer
- Spouses: Otis Oscar Hunley (m. 1898; div. 1902); Marshall Elmer Carriere (m. 1903; div. 1912); Paul P. Perry (m. 1920; div. 1922)

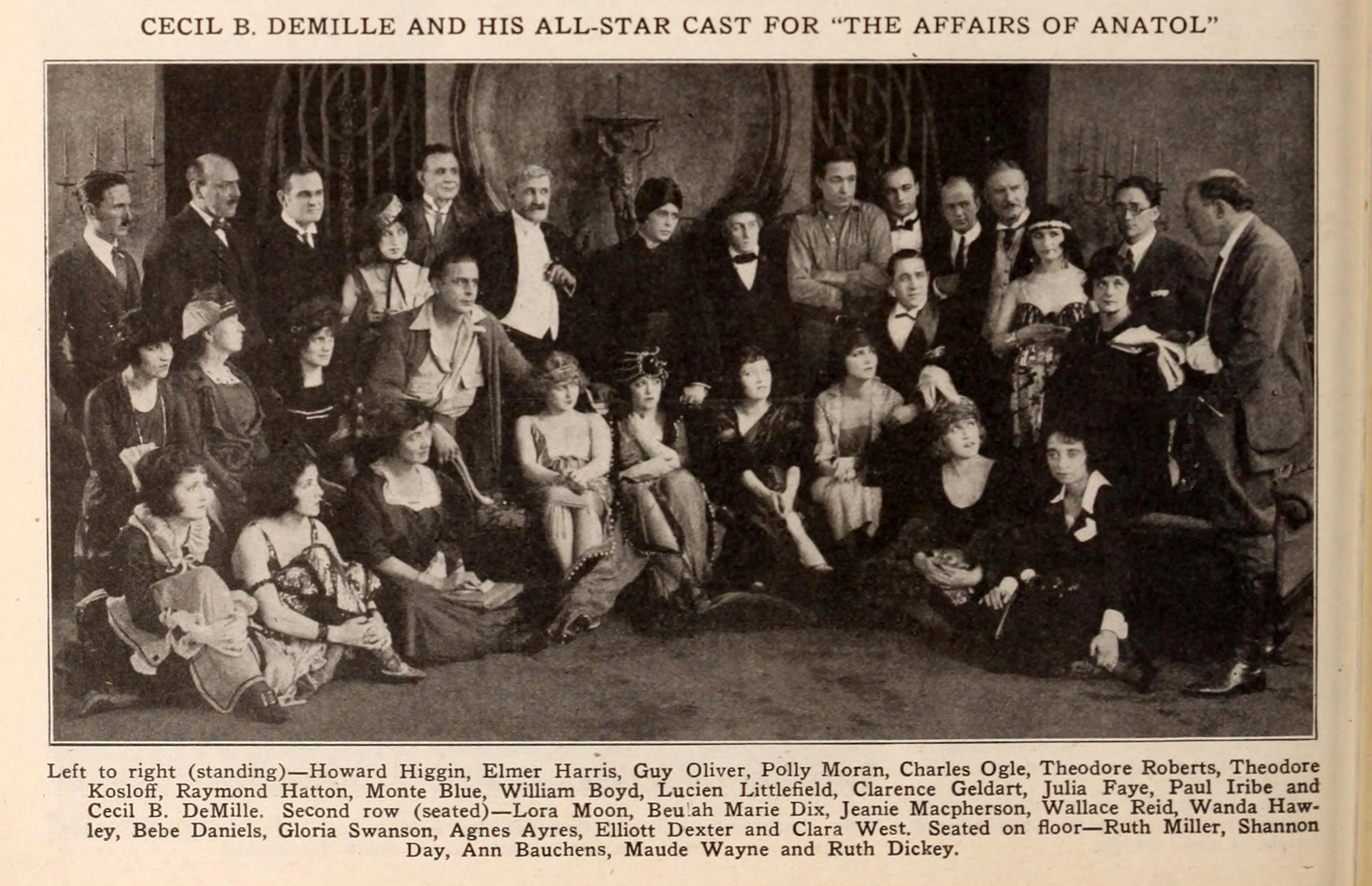
West in second row, seated, at far right

Clare West born Clara Belle Smith (May 10, 1889 in Missouri - died August 1, 1980 Ontario, California with some sources stating she was born 30 January 1879 and dying 13 March 1961) was one of the first costume designers in Hollywood. She did notable work in the films of D. W. Griffith and Cecil B. DeMille. Recognising the importance of film costume in haute couture, some regard her as a predecessor in the American Look.

== Career ==
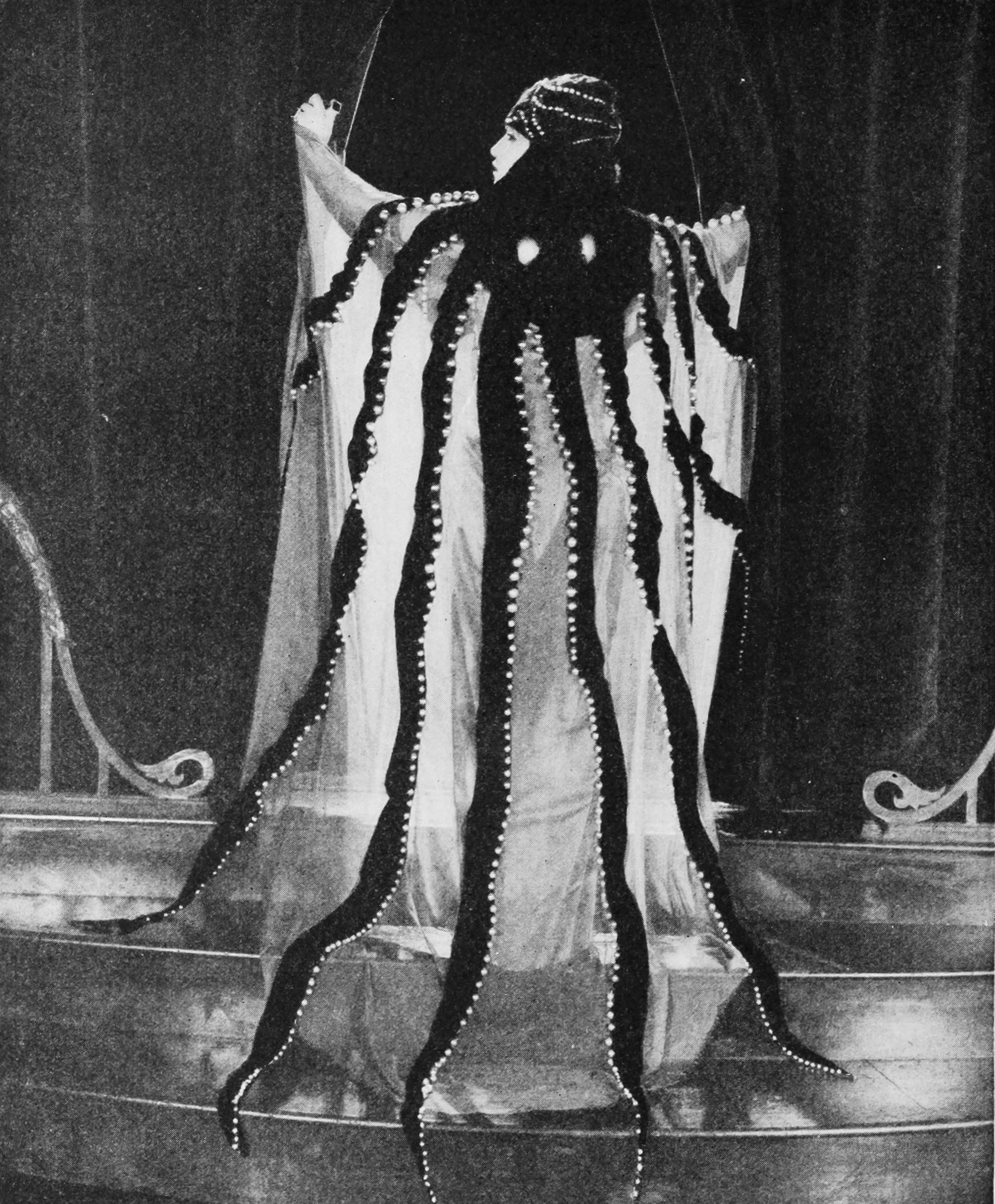
"Octopus gown" designed by West and worn by Bebe Daniels in The Affairs of Anatol (1921)

West began her career spending two years designing costumes for Intolerance (released 1916) in collaboration with French designer Paul Iribe. The Babylonian costumes of the film were believed to have inspired fashion trends with an April 1917 Photoplay article entitled "Back to Babylon for New Fashions". West's impressive work led her to be given the title of "Studio Designer" at Triangle Film Corporation. Intolerance was believed to be the first Hollywood film to feature costumes designed for every cast member, including extras.

West then worked on her second D. W. Griffith production, The Birth of a Nation (1915). The designs produced for the Ku Klux Klan by the film's costume designers proved influential, inspiring the current dress of the KKK. It remains unclear whether that legacy belongs to Clare West, one of her colleagues, or Griffth himself.

West went into a ten-film collaboration with Cecil B. DeMille where the producer/director stated "I want clothes that will make people gasp when they see them...don't design anything anybody could possibly buy in a store"

In 1923, West was contracted to Norma Talmadge and Constance Talmadge who played the "Mountain Girl" in Intolerance.

West's final film was DeMille's The Road to Yesterday (1925).

== Post Hollywood ==
West opened a dress salon in Los Angeles in 1925 which did not remain open for long. A 1930 census listed her as a department store dress designer and living in a boarding house. A 1940 census listed her as a designer for Patricia Perkins Inc.

== Personal life ==
West married Otis Oscar Hunley on August 24, 1898, had one child Maxwell Otis Hunley, then divorced in 1902. In 1903, West married Marshall Elmer Carriere, had three sons and divorced around 1912. Despite studio hype of her having studied fashion in New York and Paris, there is no evidence of formal studies in either location, though DeMille sent her to Paris to research and purchase materials for his The Ten Commandments (1923). In 1920, she married cinematographer Paul P. Perry but were divorced in 1922. She never married again.

She died of a heart attack.

West was inducted into the Costume Designers Guild Hall of Fame in 2003.

== Filmography ==
- The Birth of a Nation (1915)
- Little Meena's Romance (1916)
- Intolerance: Love's Struggle Throughout the Ages (1916)
- Dust of Desire (1919)
- Male and Female (1919)
- Why Change Your Wife? (1920)
- Something to Think About (1920)
- Forbidden Fruit (1921)
- The Affairs of Anatol (1921)
- Saturday Night (1922)
- Manslaughter (1922)
- Bella Donna (1923)
- Ashes of Vengeance (1923)
- Hollywood (1923) - makes cameo appearance in the film
- Adam's Rib (1923)
- The Ten Commandments (1923)
- The Song of Love (1923)
- For Sale (1924)
- Flirting with Love (1924)
- The Navigator (1924)
- In Every Woman's Life (1924)
- Secrets (1924)
- The Goldfish (1924)
- Sherlock Jr. (1924)
- The Golden Bed (1925)
- The Lady (1925)
- The Road to Yesterday (1925)
