= Thin Ice (1919 film) =

1919 film by Thomas R. Mills

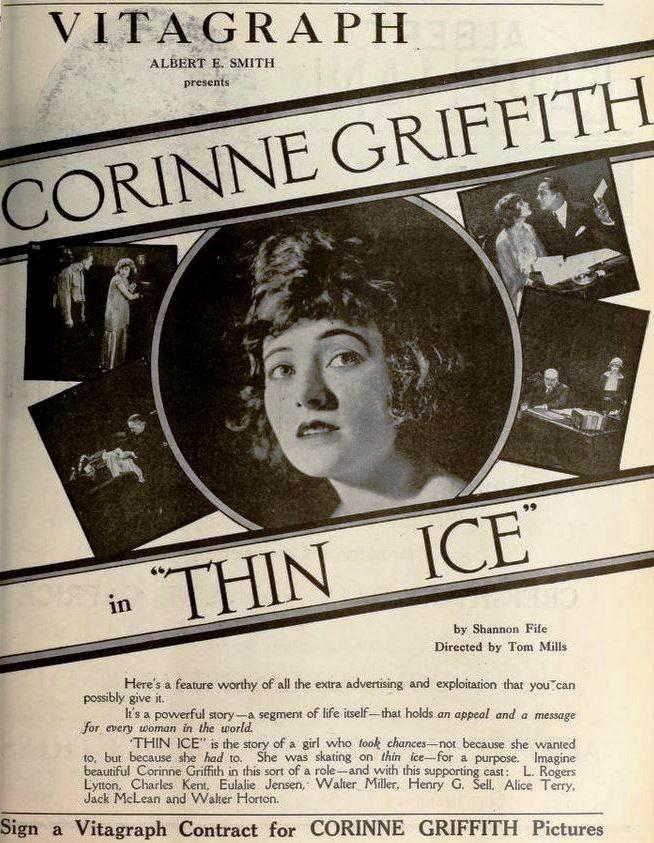
- advertisement
- Directed by: Thomas R. Mills
- Written by: Shannon Fife (story); G. Marion Burton (scenario)
- Produced by: Vitagraph Company of America
- Starring: Corinne Griffith
- Cinematography: Tom Malloy
- Distributed by: Vitagraph Company of America
- Release date: May 26, 1919
- Running time: 5 reels
- Country: United States
- Language: Silent (English intertitles)

Thin Ice is a 1919 American silent drama film directed by Thomas R. Mills and starring Corinne Griffith. It was produced and distributed through the Vitagraph Company of America.

This film is preserved at the Bois d'Arcy Archive in Paris, France.

== Plot ==
As described in a film magazine, Ned Winton is employed in the office of Benjamin Graves, a crooked dealer in mining company stocks, and speculates using the firm's funds. Alice, his sister, prevents his arrest by signing a note for the amount stolen and puts up as collateral the mining firm stock sold to her father by Graves. Alice marries an author of note. Graves then manipulates the stock and ruins the mining company used as collateral, and notifies Alice that the stock is worthless and that she must put up new security. She goes to see him only to find that he has concocted evidence which would convince her husband that she has been his mistress, and Graves insists that she gratify his desires. She escapes and returns home, planning on robbing her husband's safe to pay the debt. Ned has been taken in by her husband to test a theory regarding the reformation of criminals. When he hears Alice's story, he threatens the life of Graves and goes to his home. Alice also goes there and arrives first, and is accused of the murder of Graves. A dramatic ending involving Grave's mistress brings about a happy ending.

== Cast ==
- Corinne Griffith as Alice Winton
- Charles Kent as George Winton
- Jack McLean as Ned Winton
- L. Rogers Lytton as Benjamin Graves
- Walter Horton as Paul Rooks
- Eulalie Jensen as Rose La Vere
- Henry G. Sell as Robert Burton
- Walter Miller as Jeffrey Miller
- Alice Terry as Jocelyn Miller
