= Thomas R. Mills =

British actor (1878–1953)

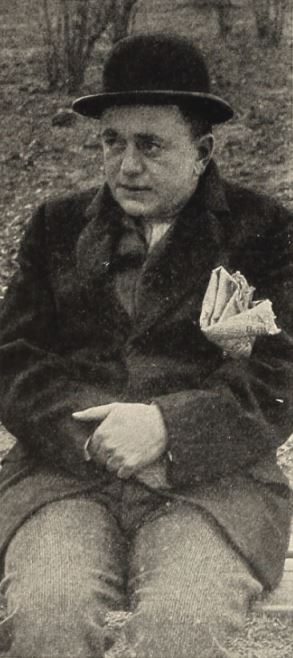
- Mills in The Cop and the Anthem (1917)
- Born: June 28, 1878; Headcorn, Kent, England
- Died: November 29, 1953 (aged 75); Woodland Hills, California
- Occupations: Actor, Director
- Known for: Silent films
- Notable work: The Crown Prince's Double, The Great Impersonation, It's Love I'm After

Thomas R. Mills (1878-1953), billed as Tom Mills, was an actor and director of silent films. He was a theater actor until he joined Vitagraph to make films.

He was born in Headcorn, Kent, England.

== Filmography ==
=== Actor ===
- The Making Over of Geoffrey Manning (1915)
- The Man Who Couldn't Beat God (1915)
- The Hero of Submarine D-2 (1916)
- The Crown Prince's Double (1916)
- Whom the Gods Destroy (1916)
- Indiscretion (1917)
- A Man's Mate (1924)
- The Star Dust Trail (1924)
- The Guilty One (1924)
- The Arizona Romeo (1924)
- The Wolf Man (1924)
- The Kiss Barrier (1925)
- Tides of Passion (1925)
- The Gilded Highway (1926)
- The Great Impersonation (1935)
- It's Love I'm After (1937)

=== Director ===
- The Duplicity of Hargraves (1917), film adaptation
- A Night in New Arabia (1917)
- The Girl in His House (1918)
- Thin Ice (1919)
- The Unknown Quantity (1919)
- A Girl at Bay (1919)
- Duds (1920)
- The Invisible Divorce (1920), co-directed
