= Out with the Tide =

1928 film

- Directed by: Charles Hutchison
- Written by: John C. Brownell; G. Marion Burton; Paul Perez; Elaine Towne
- Starring: Dorothy Dwan; Cullen Landis; Crauford Kent
- Cinematography: Paul Perez
- Edited by: Leon Shamroy
- Production company: Peerless Pictures
- Release date: June 22, 1928
- Running time: 6 reels
- Country: United States
- Languages: Silent; English intertitles

Out with the Tide is a 1928 American silent drama film directed by Charles Hutchison and starring Dorothy Dwan, Cullen Landis and Crauford Kent.

== Cast ==
- Dorothy Dwan as Joan Renshaw
- Cullen Landis as John Templeton
- Crauford Kent as Ralph Kennedy
- Mitchell Lewis as Captain Lund
- Ernest Hilliard as Snake Doyle
- Sôjin Kamiyama as Chee Chee
- Jimmy Aubrey as Jimmy
- Arthur Thalasso as Clancey

== Bibliography ==
- Munden, Kenneth White. The American Film Institute Catalog of Motion Pictures Produced in the United States, Part 1. University of California Press, 1997.
