= Greater Than Fame =

1920 film by Alan Crosland

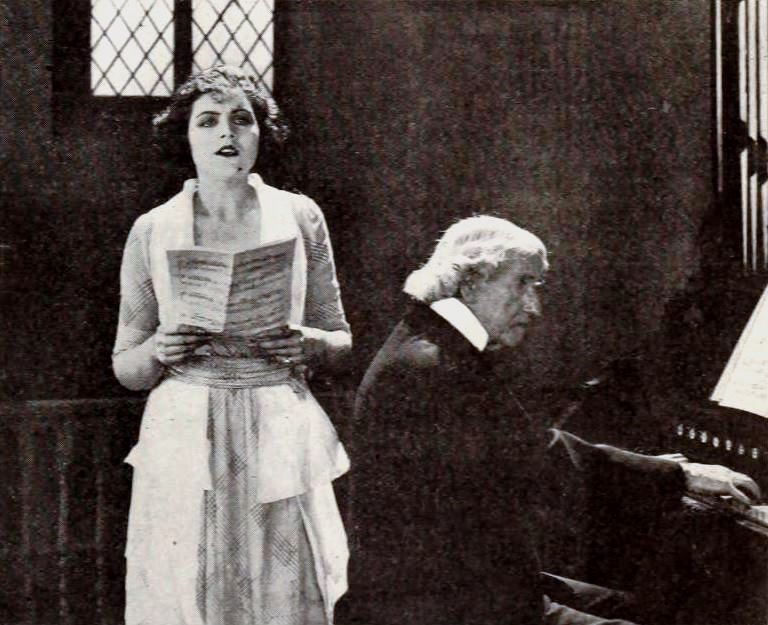
- Still
- Directed by: Alan Crosland
- Written by: S. Jay Kaufman (story); Katherine S. Reed (scenario)
- Produced by: Selznick Pictures
- Starring: Elaine Hammerstein; Walter McGrail
- Cinematography: Jules Cronjager
- Edited by: Cyril Gardner
- Distributed by: Selznick Pictures
- Release date: January 1920
- Running time: 5 reels
- Country: United States
- Language: Silent (English intertitles)

Greater Than Fame is a 1920 American silent drama film produced and distributed by Selznick Pictures. It was directed by Alan Crosland and stars Elaine Hammerstein. It is not known whether the film currently survives.

== Plot ==
As described in a film magazine, Margaret Brooke (Hammerstein), a young small town woman, is given an allowance of twenty dollars a week to go to the city to have her voice trained. She falls in with an elderly musician, who cares for her, and a young composer, with whom she falls in love. The Warings, wealthy and sophisticated, take an interest in Margaret, Mrs. Waring (Gordon) inviting her into their home so that she may see a gathering of successful artists and learn their shortcomings, while Philip Waring (Tooker), unprincipled, seeking to bring about her downfall. Margaret accepts, innocently, the apartment Mr. Waring secures for her. Her sweetheart sees Mr. Waring come to her apartment and misunderstands. She then goes to the home of the master of the Cosmopolitan Opera House, and he also makes undesirable advances. Returning to the home of the man she loves, she vindicates herself and the two begin their fight for fame together.

== Cast ==
- Elaine Hammerstein as Margaret Brooke
- Walter McGrail as Jack Martin
- William H. Tooker as Philip Waring (credited as W.H. Tooker)
- Julia Swayne Gordon as Mrs. Waring
- Albert Roccardi as Professor Guerdet
- Cora Williams as Mrs. Guerdet
- Johnnie Walker as Clarence (credited as John Walker)
- Arthur Donaldson as Saxer
- Florida Kingsley as Aunt Prudence (credited as Flora Kingsley)
- Eugenie Woodward as Aunt Mercy
- James A. Furey as Organist (credited as J. Furey)

== Production ==
Director Alan Crosland hired internationally recognized dancer Mlle. Desiree Lubovska to appear in an upscale party sequence. Lubovska appears as a specialty dancer.

The working title of the film was Love or Fame?
