= Sacred Silence (1919 film) =

1919 film by Harry F. Millarde

- Directed by: Harry F. Millarde
- Distributed by: Fox Film
- Release date: 1919
- Country: United States
- Language: Silent...(English titles)

Sacred Silence is a 1919 American silent drama film directed by Harry F. Millarde and starring William Russell and Agnes Ayres.

== Cast ==
- William Russell
- Agnes Ayres
- George MacQuarrie
- James Morrison - Lt. Ralph Harrison
- Tom Brooke
- Mabel Julienne Scott

== Preservation ==
The film is currently lost.
