= G. Marion Burton =

American screenwriter

- Born: Gertrude Marion L. Hopkins; June 8, 1875; Stillwater, Minnesota, USA
- Died: January 3, 1952; New York, New York, USA
- Education: Emerson College
- Occupation(s): Screenwriter, reporter
- Spouse: Henry Bergen

Gertrude Marion Burton (née Hopkins June 8, 1875 – January 3, 1952), also known by her married name, Gertrude Bergen, was an American screenwriter, reporter, and playwright active during Hollywood's silent era.

== Biography ==
Burton was born into an affluent family in Stillwater, Minnesota, and raised primarily in San Francisco. She was the only child of Jesse Pease Hopkins and Ella Clewell. She was educated at the Irving Institute in San Francisco, and eventually graduated from Emerson College in Boston.

As a writer, her work appeared in publications like Parisienne, Collier's Smart Set, Town and Country, and Vanity Fair, and she also wrote a number of screenplays for director E.H. Griffith. Her weekly column called "Broadway Silhouettes" ran in several newspapers.

She married Henry Hannah Bergen in 1899 in Brooklyn, New York. The pair resided at the Grand Hotel in Manhattan.

== Selected filmography ==
- Out with the Tide (1928)
- Golden Shackles (1928)
- Burnt Fingers (1927)
- Another Scandal (1924)
- Untamed Youth (1924)
- The Custard Cup (1923)
- The Face on the Bar-Room Floor (1923)
- The Woman Game (1920)
- Thin Ice (1919)
- The Unknown Quantity (1919)
- Miss Dulcie from Dixie (1919)
- The Wishing Ring Man (1919)
