= Katherine S. Reed =

American screenwriter and playwright

- Born: July 1, 1881; Washington, Pennsylvania, USA
- Died: July 1, 1922 (aged 41); Long Island, New York, USA
- Education: Bryn Mawr College
- Occupations: Screenwriter, suffragist, journalist

Katherine Speer Reed (July 1, 1881 – July 1, 1922) was an American screenwriter and playwright active during Hollywood's silent era. She was also a journalist active in the women's suffrage movement.

== Biography ==
Katherine was born in Washington, Pennsylvania, to Presbyterian minister William Reed and his wife, Margaret McKnight.

By the early 1910s, she was employed as a journalist and was active in the fight to get women the right to vote. She traveled the country organizing conventions, publishing stories, and serving as executive secretary of the Pennsylvania Women's Suffrage Association.

During the late 1910s and early 1920s, she wrote more than two dozen scenarios for early silent pictures produced for the Vitagraph and Selznick companies. Titles included Lorna Doone, Greater Than Fame, and Let's Elope.

She died on July 1, 1922, at her brother's home on Long Island, after an illness of about a year.

== Selected filmography ==
- Lorna Doone (1922)
- Who Am I? (1921)
- The Palace of Darkened Windows (1920)
- The Invisible Divorce (1920)
- Blind Youth (1920)
- Greater Than Fame (1920)
- Just a Wife (1920)
- Nothing But the Truth (1920)
- The Bramble Bush (1919)
- A Girl at Bay (1919)
- Let's Elope (1919)
- The Enchanted Barn (1919)
- The Girl in His House (1918)
- The Enchanted Profile (1918) (short)
- The Business of Life (1918)
- Schools and Schools (1918)
- Seeking an Oversoul (1918) (short)
- The Skylight Room (1917)
- The Renaissance at Charleroi (1917)
- The Indian Summer of Dry Valley Johnson (1917)
- Blind Man's Holiday (1917)
- Bobby's Bravery (1917) (short)
- The Guilty Party (1917) (short)
- No Story (1917)
- The Gold That Glittered (1917) (short)
- A Service of Love (1917) (short)
- The Gift of the Magi (1917) (short)
