= A Girl at Bay =

1919 film by Tom Mills

- Directed by: Tom Mills
- Written by: Katherine S. Reed
- Produced by: Vitagraph Company of America
- Starring: Corinne Griffith
- Cinematography: Tom Malloy
- Distributed by: Vitagraph Company of America
- Release date: June 28, 1919
- Running time: 5 reels
- Country: USA
- Language: Silent..English titles

A Girl at Bay is a lost 1919 silent film drama directed by Tom Mills and starring Corinne Griffith. It was produced and distributed by the Vitagraph Company of America. Katherine S. Reed wrote the screenplay.

== Cast ==
- Corinne Griffith -
- Walter Miller - Bruce Craigin
- Harry Davenport - Frank Galt
- Denton Vane - Thomas Gray
- Walter Horton - Detective Hooker
