= A Man's Mate =

1924 film

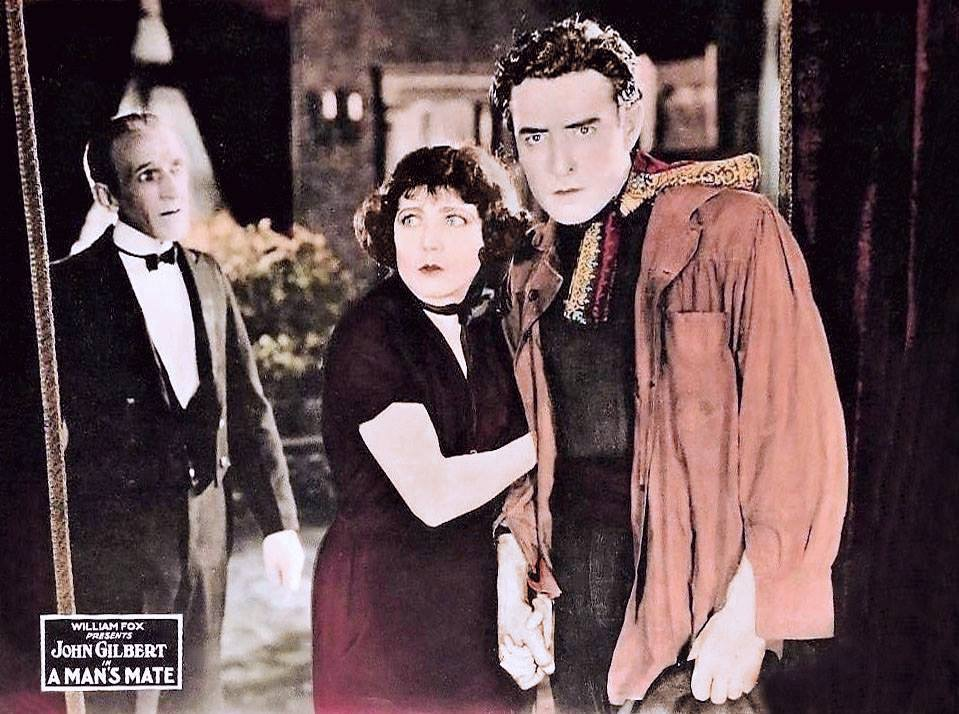
- Directed by: Edmund Mortimer
- Screenplay by: Charles Kenyon
- Starring: John Gilbert; Renée Adorée; Noble Johnson; Wilfrid North; Thomas R. Mills; James Neill
- Cinematography: G.O. Post
- Production company: Fox Film Corporation
- Distributed by: Fox Film Corporation
- Release date: March 16, 1924
- Running time: 60 minutes
- Country: United States
- Language: Silent (English intertitles)

A Man's Mate is a 1924 American silent drama film directed by Edmund Mortimer and written by Charles Kenyon. The film stars John Gilbert, Renée Adorée, Noble Johnson, Wilfrid North, Thomas R. Mills, and James Neill. The film was released on March 16, 1924, by Fox Film Corporation.

== Plot ==
As described in a film magazine review, Paul Bonard's wealthy father is opposed to his son's choice of an artist's career. Two Apaches, the Lion and Lynx, quarrel over the Wildcat, a female member of their Paris gang. The Lynx flees, meets Paul, stuns him, and changes clothes with him. Paul is brought to the Apache den, where he conquers the Lion in a desperate fight. Paul has lost his memory and falls in love with the Wildcat. He paints a picture of her. She discovers his identity, he goes home, submits to an operation, and recovers his memory. Later he seeks out and marries the Wildcat.

== Cast ==
- John Gilbert as Paul Bonard
- Renée Adorée as Wildcat
- Noble Johnson as Lion
- Wilfrid North as Monsieur Bonard
- Thomas R. Mills as Father Pierre
- James Neill as Veraign
- Jack Giddings as Lynx
- Patterson Dial as Sybil

== Preservation ==
With no prints of A Man's Mate located in any film archives, it is considered a lost film.
