= Bye, Bye, Buddy =

- Directed by: Frank S. Mattison
- Written by: Barry Barringer; Arthur Hotaling; Frank S. Mattison
- Starring: Agnes Ayres; Ben F. Wilson
- Cinematography: Robert E. Cline
- Edited by: Minnie Steppler
- Production company: Hercules Film Productions
- Distributed by: Trinity Pictures
- Release date: March 25, 1929
- Running time: 63 minutes
- Country: United States
- Language: English

Bye, Bye, Buddy is a 1929 American drama film directed by Frank S. Mattison and starring Agnes Ayres and Ben F. Wilson.

== Synopsis ==
In New York City's east side in 1907, Glad O'Brien is the mother of a young child, Buddy, and wife to a gangster, Dandy. When her husband is accused of a crime, the beat officer, who was once her suitor, allows the couple a fifteen-minute window to escape. Years pass, during which time she enlists her child in military school, and the characters meet each other again during World War I.

== Cast ==
- Agnes Ayres as Glad O'Brien
- Robert 'Buddy' Shaw as Buddy O'Brien
- Fred Shanley as Dandy O'Brien
- Ben F. Wilson as Maj. Horton
- John Orlando as Johnny Cohen
- David Henderson as Marty Monihan
- Hall Cline as Attorney

== Production ==
Bye, Bye, Buddy is adapted from original material written by Ben Hirschfield, an unspecified group of early talking pictures, and the Ackerman and Harris vaudeville program featured at Hippodrome theater. Parts of the film were shot on location in France and Belgium.

== Reception ==
The News of Cumberland County called it "remarkably well done, with a very clever story, splendid direction and backgrounds, the war scenes being especially effective." The publication stated that the film's plot "is built upon mother love that outshines the hatred of war, a picture that will linger long in your memory." The Pottsville Republican called it "a story of scenes and words that will grip the heart of the hardest individual."

== Bibliography ==
- Langman, Larry. A Guide to American Screenwriters: The Sound Era. Garland Publish, 1984.
