= The Unknown Quantity (film) =

1919 American silent directed by Thomas R. Mills

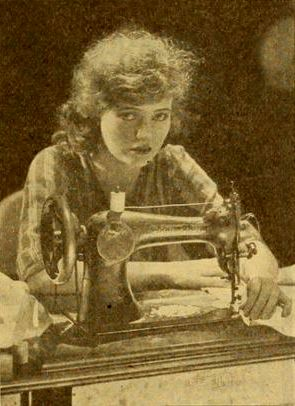
- Still from the American drama film The Unknown Quantity (1919) with Corinne Griffith with a sewing machine
- Directed by: Thomas R. Mills
- Written by: G. Marion Burton (scenario)
- Based on: The Unknown Quantity, a short story by O. Henry
- Starring: Corinne Griffith
- Cinematography: Tom Malloy
- Distributed by: Vitagraph Company of America
- Release date: April 14, 1919 (United States)
- Running time: 50 minutes
- Country: United States
- Language: Silent (English intertitles)

The Unknown Quantity is a lost 1919 American silent directed by Thomas R. Mills produced and distributed by the Vitagraph Company of America. It is based on the 1910 short story of the same name by O. Henry.

== Plot ==
A profiteer's son falls in love with one of his father's victims and secures the acquittal of her brother who was falsely accused of murder.

== Cast ==
- Corinne Griffith as Mary Boyne
- Huntley Gordon as Dan Kinsolving
- Harry Davenport as Septimus Kinsolving
- Jack Ridgeway as Thomas Boyne
- Frederick Buckley as Peter Kenwitz
- Jack McLean as Sammy Boyne
