= The Ten Commandments (1923 film) =

1923 film by Cecil B. DeMille

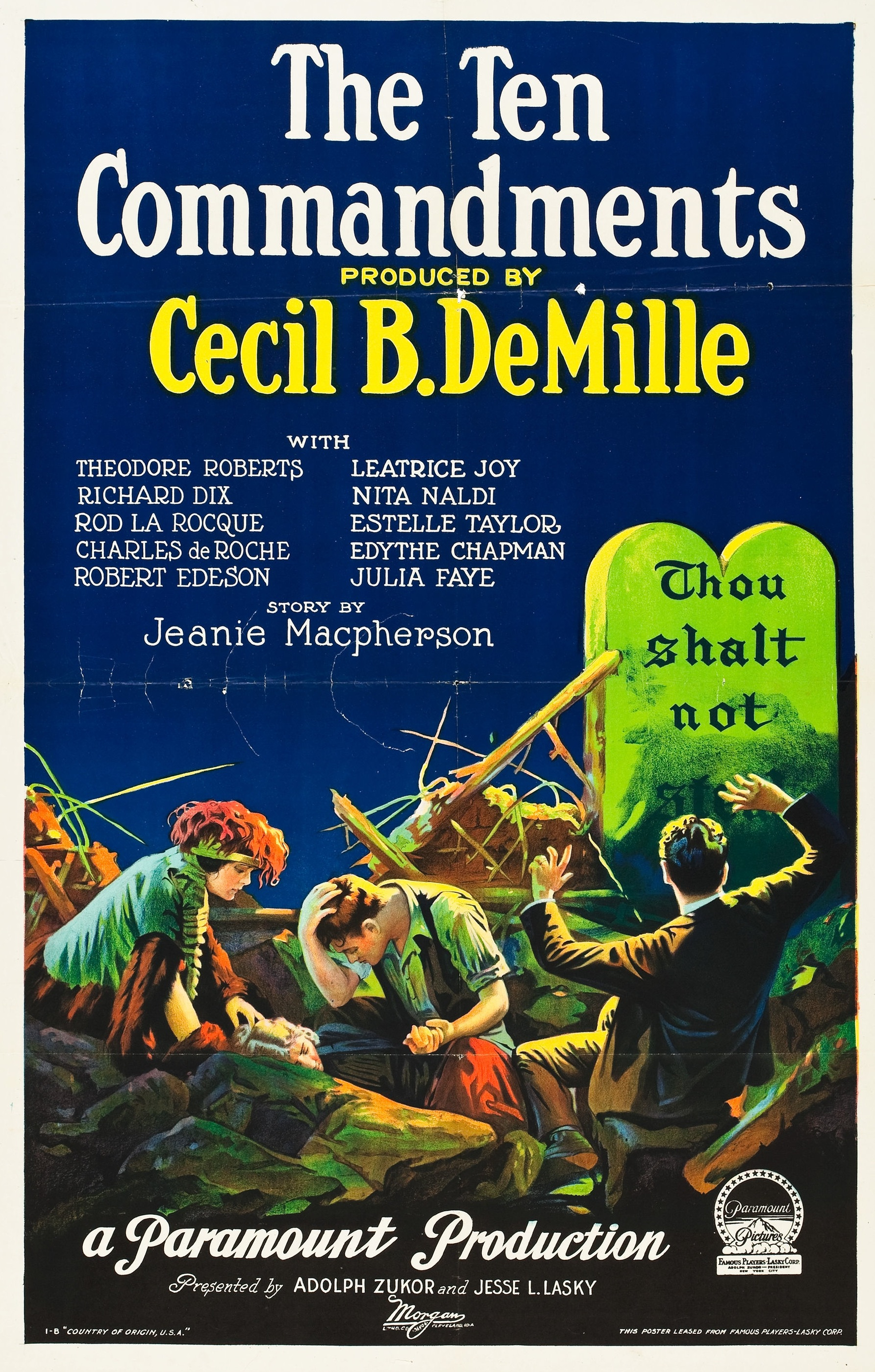
- Theatrical release poster
- Directed by: Cecil B. DeMille
- Story by: Jeanie MacPherson
- Produced by: Cecil B. DeMille
- Starring: Theodore Roberts; Charles De Roche; Estelle Taylor; Julia Faye; Richard Dix; Rod La Rocque; Leatrice Joy; Nita Naldi
- Cinematography: Bert Glennon; Peverel Marley; Archibald Stout; J. F. Westerberg
- Edited by: Anne Bauchens
- Color process: Technicolor
- Production company: Famous Players–Lasky Corporation
- Distributed by: Paramount Pictures
- Release dates: December 4, 1923 (Los Angeles premiere); December 21, 1923 (New York City premiere)
- Running time: 136 minutes
- Country: United States
- Languages: Silent; English intertitles
- Budget: $1.5 million
- Box office: $4.2 million

The Ten Commandments is a 1923 American silent religious epic film produced and directed by Cecil B. DeMille. Written by Jeanie MacPherson, the film is divided into two parts: a prologue recreating the biblical story of the Exodus and a modern story concerning two brothers and their respective views of the Ten Commandments.

Lauded for its "immense and stupendous" scenes, use of Technicolor process 2, and parting of the Red Sea sequence, the expensive film proved to be a box-office hit upon release. It grossed $4.2 million on a $1.5 million budget. It is the first in DeMille's biblical trilogy, followed by The King of Kings (1927) and The Sign of the Cross (1932). DeMille later directed a sound remake of the film in 1956, which focuses solely on the Exodus scenes.

The Ten Commandments is one of many works from 1923 that entered the public domain in the United States in 2019.

== Plot ==
The Ten Commandments

The film has two parts: the Prologue, the epic tale of Moses; and the Story, in a modern setting and involving living by the Ten Commandments.

=== The prologue ===
The opening statement explains that modern society mocked Judeo-Christian morality until it witnessed the horrors of World War I; it then beseeches the viewer to return to the Commandments, calling them "the fundamental principles without which mankind cannot live together. They are not laws—they are the LAW." From there, the Book of Exodus is recounted, starting just after the ninth plague.

After their flight from Egypt, and the Crossing of the Red Sea, Moses climbs Mount Sinai and witnesses the Commandments given as writing in the sky, which he then carves into Tablets of Stone. When he returns, he finds that the Israelites have fallen into debauchery and built a golden calf to worship. Furiously, he smashes the Commandments, deeming the Israelites unworthy. Dathan and Miriam seduce each other, to the horror of both, that she has hideous sores covering her hands and is unclean, prompting her to beg Moses to be cleansed. Moses calls on God's power and lightning destroys the calf.

=== The story ===
Two brothers, John and Dan McTavish, live with their mother, Martha McTavish, a believer in Biblical inerrancy. The two brothers make opposite decisions; John follows his mother's teaching of the Commandments, becoming a carpenter living on meager earnings, and Dan, an avowed atheist who is convinced that the Commandments offer him nothing, vows to break every one of them and rise to the top.

Martha evicts Dan from her house. He stops at a lunch wagon. There, Mary Leigh, an impoverished but beautiful young woman, steals a bite of Dan's sandwich, triggering a madcap chase after her. She seeks refuge in the McTavish house, where John convinces his mother to take Mary in for the night. John also convinces Dan to set aside his grievance and stay; he introduces Dan to Mary. Dan quickly wins Mary over with his freewheeling ways. Martha's strict observance of the Sabbath causes friction when Dan and Mary dance on Sunday, and, although John tries to convince his mother to show grace, Dan and Mary decide that it is time to run off together.

Three years later, Dan has become a corrupt contractor. He earns a contract to build a massive cathedral and decides to cut the amount of cement in the concrete to dangerously low levels, pocketing the money saved and becoming very rich. He puts John, still a bachelor, in charge of construction, hoping to use him to provide his mother with the gifts that she refuses to accept from Dan. Dan cheats on Mary with Sally Lung, a Eurasian adulteress. One day, Martha visits John at his work site; a wall collapses on her. Fatally injured, with her last words, she tells Dan that she spent too much time trying to teach fear, not love, of God.

Now out of money, Dan learns that a muckraker tabloid threatens to expose his operation. His business partner recommends a $25,000 bribe to stop publication, but lacking the funds, Dan instead attempts suicide—his partner stops him, solely because he refuses to take the fall alone, and demands the money. He goes to Sally's apartment to take back the expensive pearls he gave her, but Sally refuses, revealing that she smuggled herself into the country from Molokai through a contraband jute shipment and is thus infected with leprosy, likely infecting Dan as well. In a rage, he kills Sally and attempts to flee to Mexico on a motorboat (Defiance), but rough weather sends him off course, and he crashes into a rocky island. His dead body is among the wreckage. Mary, fearing herself also infected, stops by John's office to say goodbye, but John insists on taking her in. As he reads to Mary the New Testament story of Jesus healing the lepers (re-enacted on screen, with Jesus shown only from behind), a light shows Mary's hands not to be scarred at all, and that her perceived scars had disappeared in the light.

Throughout the film, the visual motif of the commandments' tablets appears in the intertitles, with a particular commandment appearing on them when relevant to the story.

== Cast ==
Prologue

- Theodore Roberts as Moses, The Lawgiver
- Charles De Roche as Rameses, The Magnificent
- Estelle Taylor as Miriam, The Sister of Moses
- Julia Faye as The Wife of Pharaoh
- Pat Moore (billed as Terrence Moore) as The Son of Pharaoh
- James Neill as Aaron, Brother of Moses
- Lawson Butt as Dathan, The Discontented
- Clarence Burton as The Taskmaster
- Noble Johnson as The Bronze Man

Story

- Edythe Chapman as Mrs. Martha McTavish
- Richard Dix as John McTavish, her son
- Rod La Rocque as Dan McTavish, her son
- Leatrice Joy as Mary Leigh
- Nita Naldi as Sally Lung, a Eurasian
- Robert Edeson as Redding, an Inspector
- Charles Ogle as The Doctor
- Agnes Ayres as The Outcast

== Production ==
=== Development ===
In 1922, while he was still filming Adam's Rib, Cecil B. DeMille decided to let the public choose the subject of his next production. He did this because he made his films "for people rather than for critics". Instructed by DeMille, his publicist Barrett Kiesling arranged a contest with The Los Angeles Times in which the person who submitted the best idea for a film would receive $1,000, with prizes for runners-up totaling another $1,000. Because this was the first time a filmmaker asked the public for ideas, other newspapers published stories about the contest and thousands of letters eventually came in from many parts of the world. DeMille found that a number of contestants had submitted ideas for a religious theme, and there was one that he kept thinking about due to its "subject matter and power of expression". The first prize went to a lubricant manufacturer named F. C. Nelson of Lansing, Michigan; the first line of his one-page letter read, "You cannot break the Ten Commandments—they will break you." Seven other contestants had also suggested the Ten Commandments, so DeMille awarded $1,000 to each of the eight persons who inspired him to make The Ten Commandments. (Note: The other winners were Marie Michael of Providence, Rhode Island; Mrs. Peter Rasmussen of Long Beach, California; H. J. Bradt of Los Angeles; Mrs. Emily Hulse of Los Angeles; E. H. Peck of Hesperia, California; Mrs. Ottillie Beckett of Los Angeles; and F. E. Lynch of Los Angeles.) In his autobiography, DeMille remembered, "Here was an idea, bigger than any I had attempted to put on the screen. Here was a theme that stirred and challenged in me the heritage of being Henry DeMille's son; a theme that brightened memories of his reading the Bible aloud to us and teaching his sons that the laws of God are not mere laws, but are the Law."

In November 1922, Famous Players–Lasky executive Jesse Lasky wired DeMille that he had "succeeded [in] arousing considerable enthusiasm in [the] minds of Zukor and Kent over [the] Commandments idea". The following month, DeMille was already planning to spend $1 million and begin production around April 1, 1923. A "grapevine rumor" in Hollywood said that DeMille would not only direct the film but also act in it, along with Pola Negri and all of the other Paramount stars. By early January 1923, DeMille had sent costume designer Clare West to Paris to do research for the film.

=== Writing ===
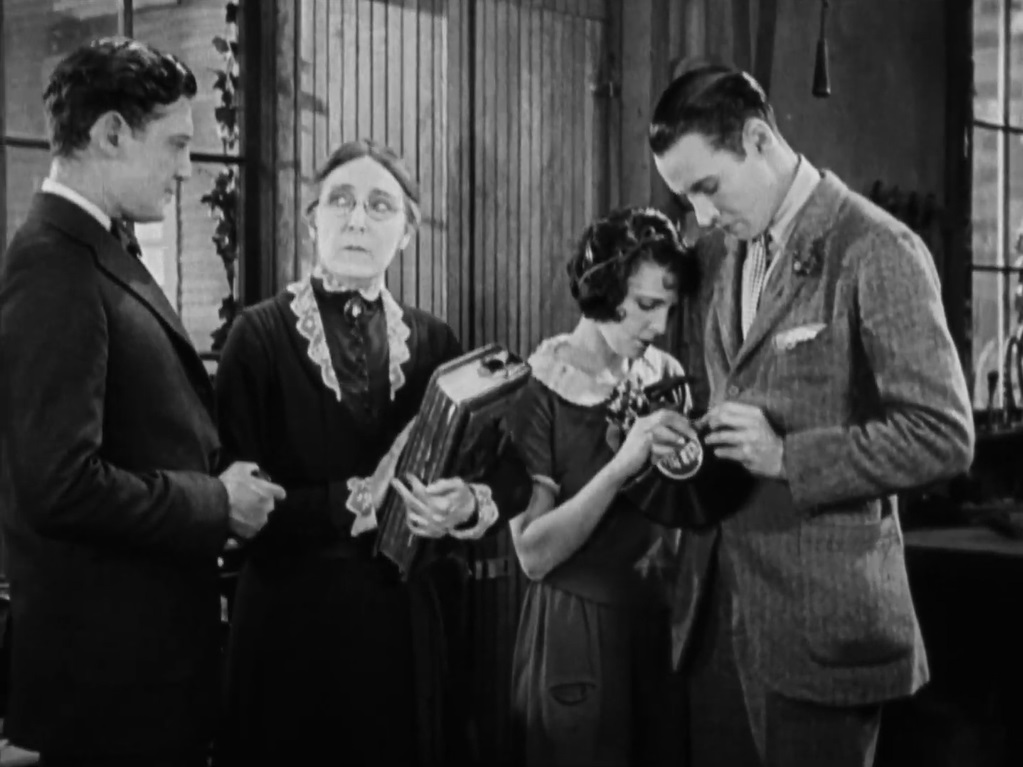
The four main characters of the modern story (from left to right): John McTavish, a carpenter; his mother, Mrs. Martha McTavish; his sister-in-law, Mary Leigh; and his brother, Dan McTavish

Jeanie MacPherson started working on the screenplay in November 1922. She first thought to "interpret the Commandments in episodic form". DeMille also considered hiring a different writer for each episode but ultimately opted to film only one story written by MacPherson. He explained, "Few, if any, episodic pictures have ever succeeded: the audience's instinct is, rightly, for dramatic unity of construction." They eventually decided on an unusual two-part screenplay: a biblical prologue and a modern story demonstrating the consequences of breaking the Ten Commandments. In a treatment for the film, MacPherson described the four main characters of the modern story:

There are four people in the modern story of The Ten Commandments, and they view these Commandments in four different ways. There is Mrs. McTavish, the mother, who keeps the Commandments the wrong way. She is narrow. She is bigoted. She is bound with ritual. She is a representative of orthodoxy, yet withal she is a fine, clean, strong woman just like dozens we all know.

There is a girl, Mary Leigh, who doesn't bother about the Ten Commandments at all. She is a good kid, but she has spent so much time working that she hasn't learned the Ten Commandments...

Dan McTavish knows the Ten Commandments, but defies them.

John McTavish is a garden variety of human being, which believes the Ten Commandments as unchanging, immutable laws of the universe. He is not a sissy or a goody-goody, he is a regular fellow, an ideal type of man of high and steadfast principles, who believes the Commandments are as practicable in 1923 as they were in the time of Moses.

=== Filming ===
Production on the film started on May 21, 1923, and ended on August 16, 1923.

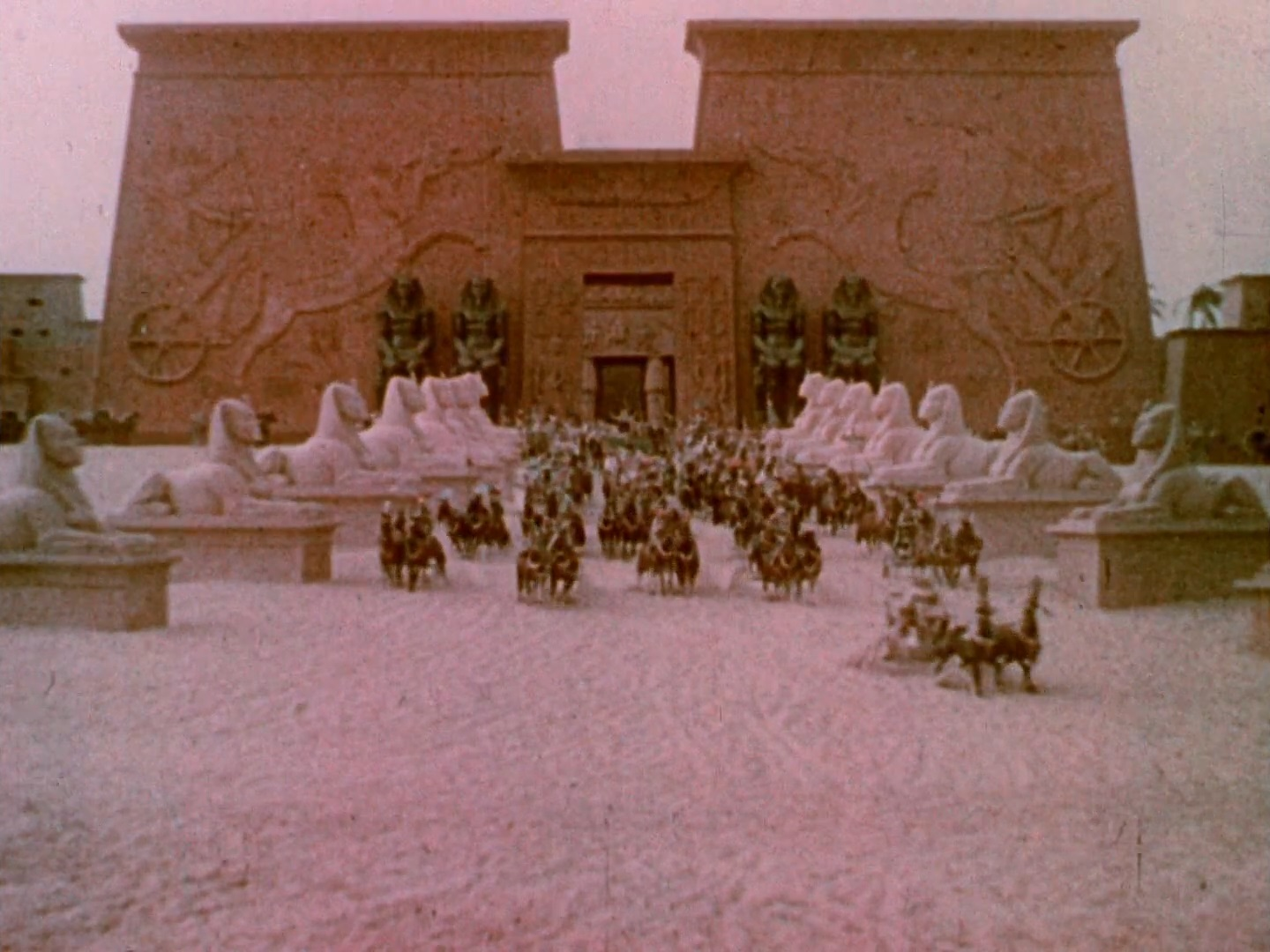
The Gates of Rameses in one of the film's Technicolor sequences

The Exodus scenes were filmed at the Guadalupe-Nipomo Dunes in northern Santa Barbara County. The film location was originally chosen because its immense sand dunes provided a superficial resemblance to the Egyptian desert. The set was said to be "the largest exterior set ever built" and two or three times larger than the castle in Douglas Fairbanks in Robin Hood. Rumor had it that after the filming was complete, the massive sets – which included four 35-foot-tall (11 m) Pharaoh statues, 21 sphinxes, and gates reaching a height of 110 feet, which were built by a small army of 1,600 workers – were dynamited and buried in the sand. Instead, the wind, rain and sand at the Guadalupe-Nipomo Dunes likely collapsed and buried a large part of the set under the ever-shifting dunes. The statues and sphinxes are in roughly the same place they were during filming. In 2012, archaeologists uncovered the head of one of the prop sphinxes; a 2014 recovery effort showed the body of that sphinx to have deteriorated significantly, but a second better-preserved sphinx was discovered and excavated. The effort to locate and excavate the set was the subject of a 2016 documentary, The Lost City of Cecil B. DeMille.

The parting of the Red Sea scene was shot in Seal Beach, California. The visual effect of keeping the walls of water apart while the Israelites walked through was accomplished with a slab of Jell-O that was sliced in two and filmed close up as it jiggled. This shot was then combined with live-action footage of Israelites walking into the distance to create the illusion.

Portions of the modern story were filmed in San Francisco, with the cathedral building sequence filmed at the then under construction Sts. Peter and Paul Church on Filbert Street and the adjoining Washington Square.

== Release ==
Distributed by Paramount Pictures, The Ten Commandments premiered at Grauman's Egyptian Theatre (in Hollywood) on December 4, 1923.

=== Critical response ===
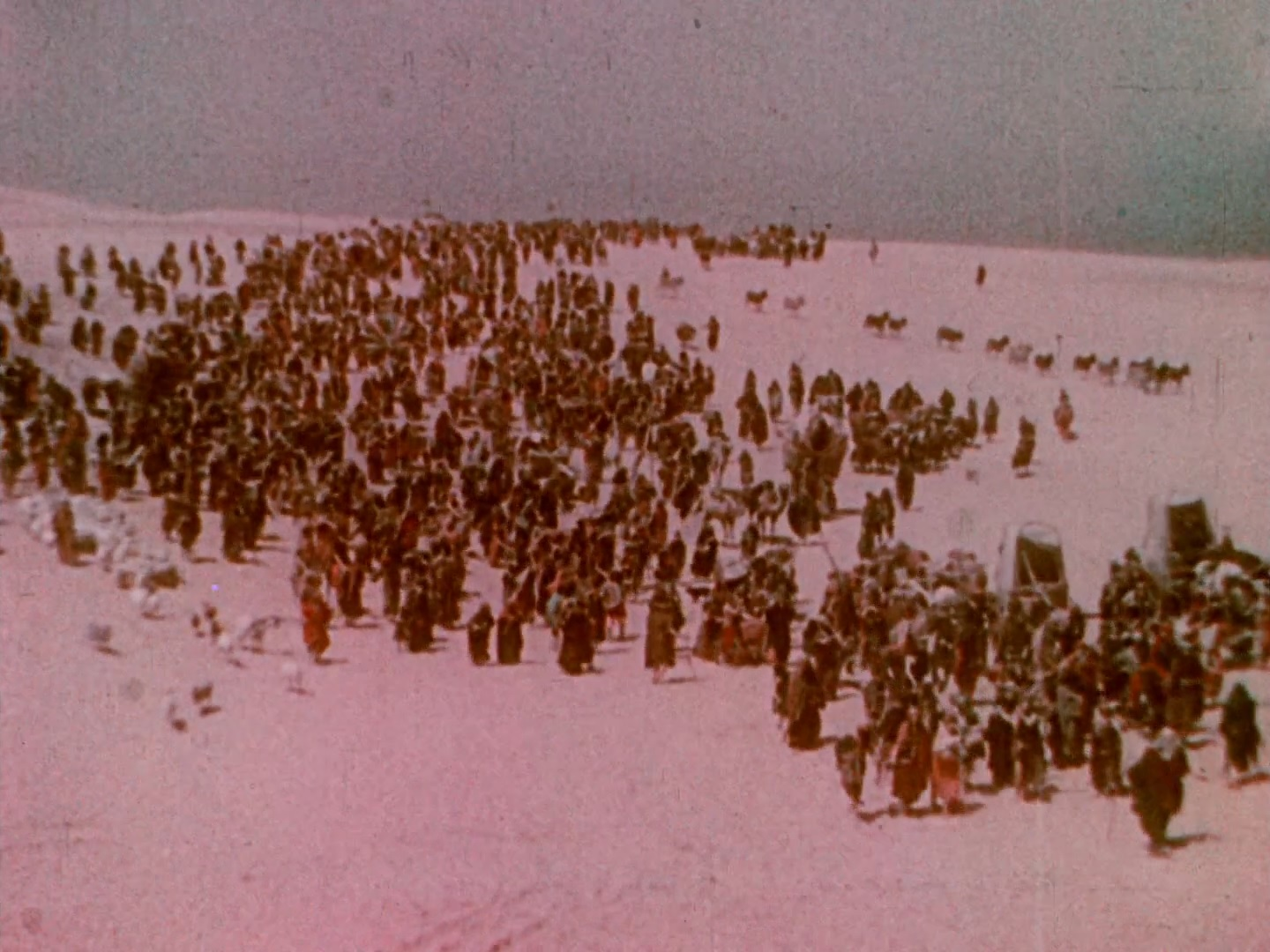
Moses leading the Israelites out of Egypt in one of the film's Technicolor sequences

On its release, critics praised The Ten Commandments overall; however, the part of the film set in modern times received mixed reviews. Variety, for example, declared the opening scenes alone worth the admission price, but found the remainder of the film disappointing by comparison: "The opening Biblical scenes of The Ten Commandments are irresistible in their assembly, breadth, color and direction [...] They are immense and stupendous, so big the modern tale after that seems puny."

According to the review aggregator website Rotten Tomatoes, 86% of critics have given the film a positive review based on 7 reviews, with an average rating of 6.7/10.

=== Box office ===
The Ten Commandments became the highest-grossing film of 1923. The film's box-office returns held the Paramount revenue record for 25 years until it was broken by other DeMille films. The film competed at the box office with Fox's The Shepherd King, and won out overall.

=== Ban in China ===
The movie was banned in the 1930s in China under a category of "superstitious films" due to its religious subject matter involving gods and deities.

== Awards ==
- In 1950, Cecil B. DeMille's The Ten Commandments was named one of the ten "best directorial achievements of the last half-century" in a Screen Directors Guild poll of film critics

== Remake ==
DeMille directed a second, expanded version of the biblical story in 1956. For the later version, DeMille dropped the modern-day storyline in favor of profiling more of Moses' early life. Julia Faye (who played Rameses' wife) and Edna Mae Cooper, two cast members of the 1923 version, also appeared in the 1956 version in the roles of Moses' sister-in-law Elisheba and a lady of the pharaoh's court, respectively. Peverell Marley worked as a cameraman on both versions.

In 2006, the 1923 film was released on DVD as an extra feature on the 50th Anniversary DVD release of the 1956 film. In the DVD commentary with Katherine Orrison included with the 1923 film, she states that DeMille refilmed several sequences nearly shot-for-shot for the new version, and also had set pieces constructed for the later film that were near-duplicates of what he had used in 1923. On March 29, 2011, Paramount released a new Blu-ray Disc with the 6-disc box set.

== See also ==
- List of early color feature films
- List of films featuring slavery
- False protagonist
- The House That Shadows Built, 1931 promotional film by Paramount
- Sands of Oblivion, Sci-Fi Channel movie centered around a haunted artifact from the 1923 film

== Bibliography ==
- DeMille, Cecil B. (1959). The Autobiography of Cecil B. DeMille. Prentice Hall. LCCN 59-15367.
