= Patterson Dial =

American actress

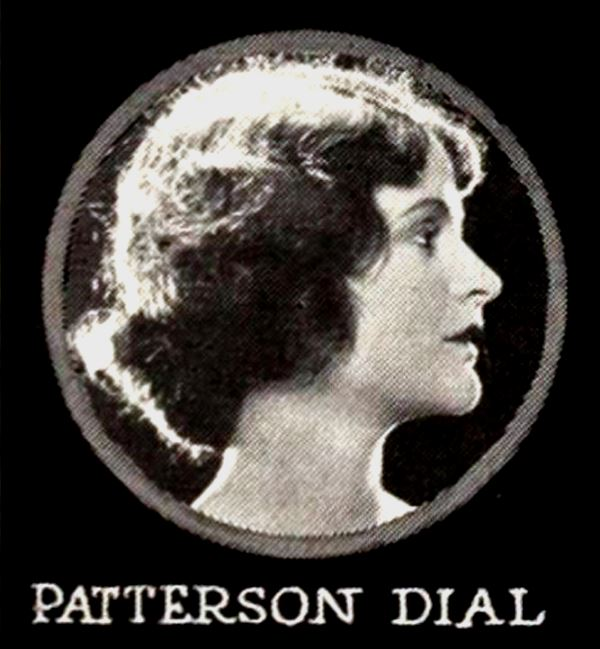
- From a 1923 film advertisement
- Born: Elizabeth Patterson Dial; May 19, 1902; Madison, Florida
- Died: March 23, 1945 (aged 42); Los Angeles, California

Elizabeth Patterson Dial (May 19, 1902 – March 23, 1945) was a writer and silent film actress of the 1920s. Later she married novelist Rupert Hughes. She was born Elizabeth Patterson Dial in Madison, Florida.

== Screen actress ==
Dial appeared in fourteen motion pictures, beginning with Gloria's Romance in 1916. The other films in which she appeared were in the three-year period from 1921 to 1924 and they included Get-Rich-Quick Wallingford (1921), Sonny (1922), Reno (1923), A Man's Mate (1924), and Married Flirts (1924).

== Married to esteemed author ==
The actress became Mrs. Rupert Hughes on January 1, 1925. The famous author and Miss Dial were wed in Los Angeles, California and took their honeymoon in New York, New York. Patterson was a well-known writer herself, under her maiden name. With Hughes, the husband and wife became noted in literary circles and formed a writing team. Hughes called her his right arm, saying she assisted him with his work and carried out her own. She experienced intense depressions. During these times Patterson became morose because she felt her writing was not up to the goal she had set for herself. Her moodiness about her work usually lifted and she felt better.

== Death ==
Patterson Dial died after taking a prescription barbiturate at the age of 42 in 1945. The circumstances were mysterious and the police could not determine whether it was an accident or suicide, as she also suffered from a heart condition. Mrs. Hughes was found unconscious in her bed at home, 4751 Los Feliz Boulevard, Los Angeles, by a maid. She died en route to a hospital in an ambulance sent by Hollywood Receiving Hospital. The Hughes had no children.

== Filmography ==
- Gloria's Romance (1916)
- Get-Rich-Quick Wallingford (1921)
- Tol'able David (1921)
- The Seventh Day (1922)
- Sonny (1922)
- Fury (1923)
- Souls for Sale (1923)
- The Silent Partner (1923)
- Reno (1923)
- A Lady of Quality (1924)
- Happiness (1924)
- A Man's Mate (1924)
- Secrets (1924)
- Married Flirts (1924)

== Sources ==
- The Los Angeles Times, "Sleeping Pills End Life of Rupert Hughes' Wife", March 24, 1945, Page A1.
- The New York Times, "Mrs Hughes Dies; Wife Of Novelist", March 24, 1945, Page 32.
- Ogden, Utah Standard-Examiner, "Rupert Hughes and Bride", January 1, 1925, Page 2.
