= The Donovan Affair =

1929 film by Frank Capra

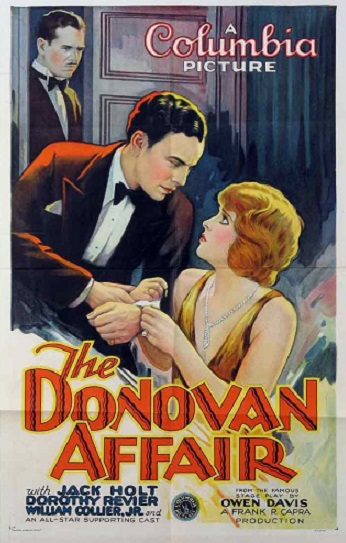
- Theatrical release poster
- Directed by: Frank Capra
- Screenplay by: Howard J. Green; Dorothy Howell
- Based on: The Donovan Affair by Owen Davis
- Produced by: Harry Cohn
- Starring: Jack Holt; Dorothy Revier; William Collier Jr.
- Cinematography: Ted Tetzlaff
- Edited by: Arthur Roberts
- Production company: Columbia Pictures
- Distributed by: Columbia Pictures
- Release date: April 11, 1929
- Running time: 83 minutes
- Country: United States
- Language: English

The Donovan Affair is a 1929 American pre-Code comedic murder-mystery film directed by Frank Capra. It was produced by Harry Cohn for Columbia Pictures and is based upon the play of the same name by Owen Davis. Its original soundtrack, recorded on soundtrack discs, has been lost, although it has been recreated for live performances.

== Plot ==
The Donovan Affair (1929; no audio)

Jack Donovan is a gambler, womanizer, and con man whose luck has run out. Losing heavily at the track, he owes large sums to a clique of gamblers who have grown impatient with his refusal to pay. They decide he must be eliminated, assigning the job to Porter, a smooth but dangerous associate.

Donovan's personal life is no less tangled. At the Craigmoor estate of retired sea captain Peter Rankin, Donovan is conducting an affair with the Captain's young second wife, Lydia Rankin, an ex-actress who married for comfort rather than love. Donovan is also ending a relationship with Mary Mills, one of Craigmoor's maids, who still loves him but now harbors resentment.

When Donovan tries to extort money from Lydia to keep her husband from learning of their affair, she refuses. Their confrontation makes her another potential enemy.

Jean Rankin, Captain Rankin's daughter from his first marriage, is in love with David Cornish, a solid young man with a jealous streak. Cornish has come to believe Donovan is visiting Jean. Lydia cannot tell him the truth—that she is the one Donovan meets—without risking a scandal that would wound her husband.

One night, Cornish sees Lydia, cloaked in Jean's wrap, rendezvous with Donovan. Mistaking her for Jean, he follows Donovan, beats him, and threatens to kill him if he ever comes near “Jean” again.

On the night of Captain Rankin's birthday dinner, the Captain—his suspicions about Donovan and his wife now strong—slips a revolver into his pocket before greeting guests. Among the arrivals are Porter, Cornish, Jean, Lydia, and various friends. Nelson, the quiet but observant butler, oversees the serving.

During dinner, Donovan amuses the company with the story of his peculiar cat's-eye ring, said to hypnotize women and glow in the dark. Skepticism runs around the table. Donovan invites a demonstration, and on Rankin's order, Nelson extinguishes the lights. The greenish glow of the ring draws exclamations—then a shadow blocks it. A groan, a crash of cutlery, and a body slump in the dark.

When the lights come on, Donovan is dead—slumped in his chair, a carving knife buried between his shoulders. Dr. Lindsey, a guest, pronounces him dead.

Inspector Killian and his assistant Carney arrive. In the babble of overlapping accusations, Killian calls for order and searches the guests. A revolver is found on Porter. Recognizing Porter's criminal past, Killian suspects him of the killing. Porter denies it but says he can point to the murderer.

Killian demands the cat's-eye ring, but it is missing—until, to his surprise, it turns up in his own pocket. Porter remarks on the extraordinary brightness of the ring in darkness. Killian is skeptical, and to test it, orders the lights turned out again while Porter begins his revelation.

In the dark, Porter resumes his account. Mid-sentence, he gasps and falls silent. The lights snap on—Porter is dead, stabbed with the same carving knife. The ring has once again disappeared. Killian's fury grows: two murders under his very nose.

A policeman returns from Donovan's apartment with fragments of a letter in a woman's hand. Killian orders Nelson to piece them together, but Nelson discreetly palms some scraps. Killian then has all the women write sample lines for comparison; Nelson switches one slip to prevent a match.

Outside, Dobbs, the wooden-legged gardener, is caught snooping. On him is found the cat's-eye ring. Dobbs swears it is his and had been stolen long ago. His alibi is accepted when Killian notes that no marks of a wooden leg appear near the victims’ chairs on the thick carpet—Dobbs could not have approached without leaving tracks.

Killian notices Jean burning a blood spot from Cornish's cuff with a cigarette. Confronted, Cornish says that in the first blackout, someone brushed against him, leaving the blood. He admits he disliked Donovan enough to kill him but insists someone else acted first. Feeling the pressure, he offers to reenact events to show how the murders were committed.

Cornish requests that everyone sit as before, with the lights extinguished. Killian positions himself beside him for protection.

In the dark, Cornish begins—but is suddenly interrupted by a scuffle. Lights flash on to reveal Killian grappling with Nelson, the butler, carving knife in his gloved hand.

Under interrogation, Nelson confesses. He had killed Donovan out of jealousy, believing Donovan was taking Mary Mills from him. Porter was slain because Nelson feared he was about to name him as the murderer. Nelson's quiet, deferential demeanor had masked his violent obsession.

== Cast ==
- Jack Holt as Inspector Killian
- Dorothy Revier as Jean Rankin
- William Collier Jr. as Cornish
- Agnes Ayres as Lydia Rankin
- John Roche as Jack Donovan
- Fred Kelsey as Carney
- Hank Mann as Dr. Lindsey
- Wheeler Oakman as Porter
- Virginia Brown Faire as Mary Mills
- Alphonse Ethier as Captain Peter Rankin
- Edward Hearn as Nelson
- Ethel Wales as Mrs. Lindsey
- John Wallace as Dobbs
- Allan Cavan as Gambler (uncredited)
- Sherry Hall as Gambler (uncredited)

== See also ==
- List of early sound feature films (1926–1929)
