= Lorna Doone (1922 film) =

1922 film by Maurice Tourneur

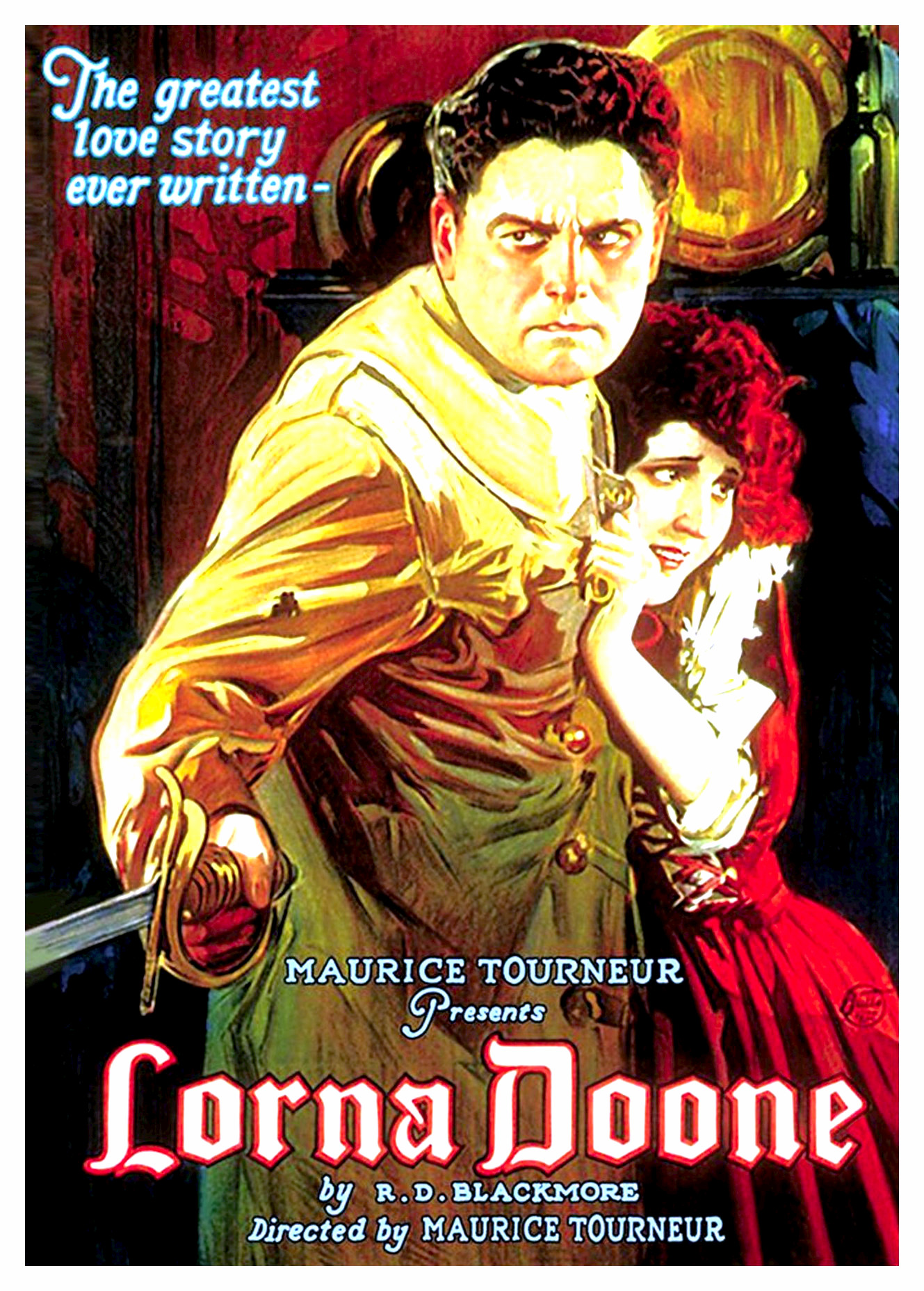
- Theatrical release poster
- Directed by: Maurice Tourneur
- Written by: Katherine S. Reed; Cecil G. Mumford; Maurice Tourneur; Wyndham Gittens
- Based on: Lorna Doone by Richard Doddridge Blackmore
- Produced by: Maurice Tourneur; Thomas H. Ince
- Starring: Madge Bellamy; John Bowers; Frank Keenan; Jack McDonald
- Cinematography: Henry Sharp
- Music by: Mari Iijima (2001 remaster)
- Distributed by: Associated First National Pictures
- Release dates: October 1, 1922 (Cleveland); December 3, 1922 (New York City)
- Running time: 7 reels
- Country: United States
- Language: Silent (English intertitles)

Lorna Doone (1922)

Lorna Doone is a 1922 American silent drama film based upon Richard Doddridge Blackmore's 1869 novel of the same name. Directed by French director Maurice Tourneur in the United States, the film starred Madge Bellamy and John Bowers.

This is one of many film adaptations of the novel. It was filmed twice before in 1912 in England for Clarendon, and in 1915 for the American Biograph Company. Other later adaptations include films in 1934 and 1951, and television movies in 1990 and 2001.

== Cast ==
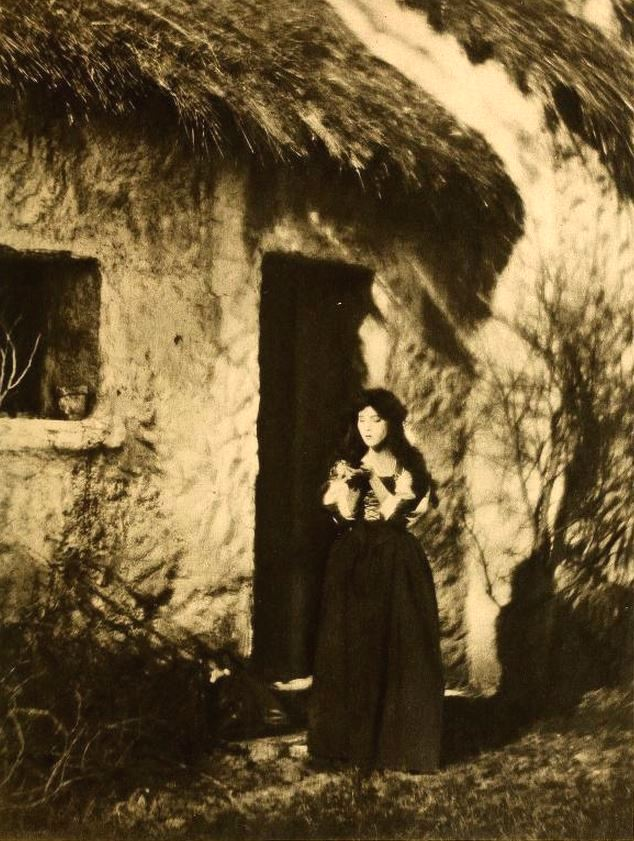
Madge Bellamy as Lorna Doone, a role which, according to Allmovie, "helped bring her stardom."

- Madge Bellamy as Lorna Doone
- Mae Giraci as Lorna as a Child (credited as Mae Giracci)
- John Bowers as John Ridd
- Charles Hatton as John as a Child
- Frank Keenan as Sir Ensor Doone
- Jack McDonald as Counsellor Doone (credited as Jack MacDonald)
- Donald McDonald as Carver Doone
- Norris Johnson as Ruth, John's Cousin
- Gertrude Astor as Countess of Brandir (uncredited)
- James Robert Chandler as Frye (uncredited)
- Irene De Voss as Lorna's Mother (uncredited)
- Joan Standing as Gwenny Carfax (uncredited)

== Restoration ==
In 2001 a digital restoration of the film was financed by Georgia cinephile Jesse Sharp and released on DVD by Kino International. Japanese singer/songwriter Mari Iijima composed an all-new musical score for the film.

== Critical reception ==
In a contemporary review, Variety wrote, "Madge Bellamy has just the right wistful quality of beauty for Lorna...the histrionic honors, however, go to that best of character portrait makers, Frank Keenan, as Sir Ensor Doone...The scenic features of the picture have been splendidly managed. The stagecoach inn might have been lifted from an authentic print of the times. The spirited passage of the coach robbery on the seashore is a smashing bit of pictorial emphasis and the action in the robber's village is scenically impressive."
