= Shannon Day =

American actress

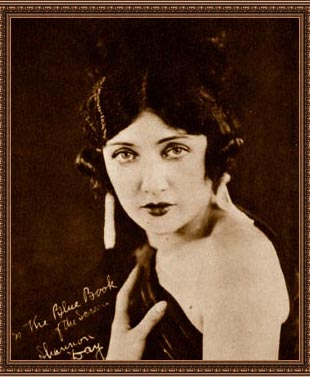
- The Blue Book of the Screen, 1923
- Born: Sylvia Day; August 5, 1896; Austro-Hungarian Empire
- Died: February 24, 1977 (aged 80); New York City, New York, U.S.
- Education: Art Students League of New York
- Occupation: Actress
- Years active: 1913–1933

Shannon Day (born Sylvia Day; August 5, 1896 – February 24, 1977) was an American silent film actress who appeared in supporting parts in numerous productions.

Day was born on August 5, 1896, in the Austro-Hungarian Empire. Her education was in New York City's public schools and in the Art Students League there.

Day began performing on stage when she was a child. Billed as Sylvia Day, she appeared on Broadway in Ziegfeld Nine O'Clock Review (1919). Her film debut came in 1921 in Cecil B. DeMille's Forbidden Fruit.

When Day left acting in films, she began teaching drama in Manhattan. She died on February 24, 1977, in New York, aged 80.

== Partial filmography ==
- Forbidden Fruit (1921)
- Man, Woman & Marriage (1921)
- The Affairs of Anatol (1921)
- After the Show (1921)
- The Woman He Married (1922)
- One Clear Call (1922)
- Captain Fly-by-Night (1922)
- North of the Rio Grande (1922)
- The Ordeal (1922)
- Fools First (1922)
- His Back Against the Wall (1922)
- Marriage Morals (1923)
- Manslaughter (1922)
- The Marriage Market (1923)
- All the Brothers Were Valiant (1923)
- The Star Dust Trail (1924)
- So This Is Marriage (1924)
- The Girl on the Stairs (1925)
- Silent Pal (1925)
- The Vanishing American (1925)
- Breed of the Sea (1926)
- The Gypsy Romance (1926)
- The Barrier (1926)
- Stranded (1927)
- Worldly Goods (1930)
- Big Town (1932)
- Hotel Variety (1933)
- Tramp, Tramp, Tramp (1942)
