= Bought and Paid For =

1922 film by William C. deMille

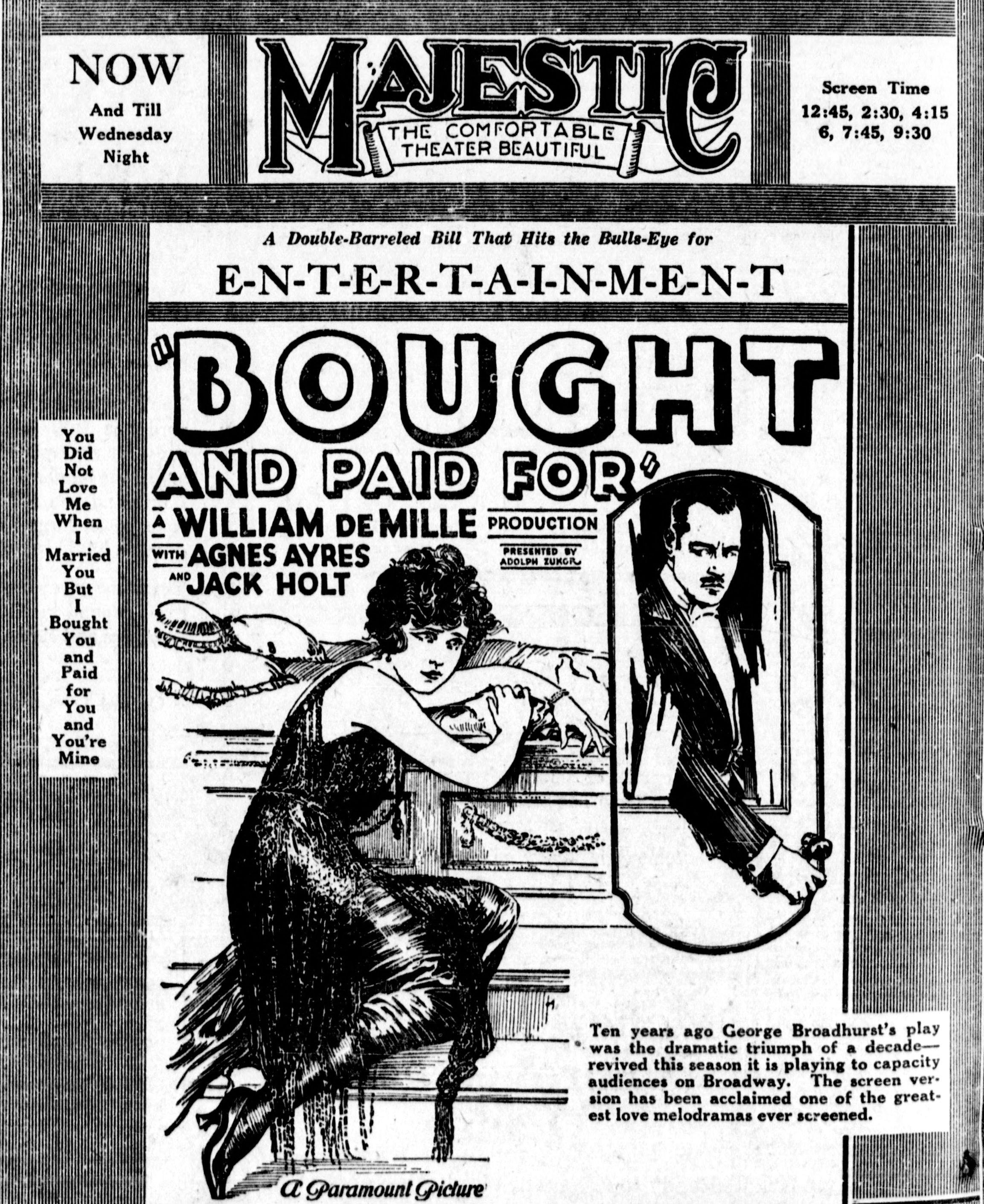
- Newspaper advertisement
- Directed by: William C. deMille
- Screenplay by: Clara Beranger
- Based on: Bought and Paid For by George Broadhurst
- Produced by: Adolph Zukor; Jesse Lasky
- Starring: Agnes Ayres
- Cinematography: L. Guy Wilky
- Distributed by: Paramount Pictures
- Release date: May 12, 1922
- Running time: 6 reels
- Country: United States
- Language: Silent (English intertitles)

Bought and Paid For is a 1922 American silent drama film produced by Famous Players–Lasky and distributed by Paramount Pictures. It was directed by William C. deMille and starred Agnes Ayres. It is based on a play by George Broadhurst performed on Broadway in 1911 with Julia Dean and revived 1921 respectively. The play was filmed before in 1916 by the World Film Company with Alice Brady in the lead role.

== Plot ==
As described in a film magazine, self-made millionaire Robert Stafford finds to his own surprise that he is falling in love with a young woman working at a hotel switchboard. Virginia Blaine is flattered by his attentions and when she consents to marry him, she is not in love with him. Her sister Fanny, who is engaged to James Gilley, is eager for Virginia to consent as it means comfort and luxury for all. Robert is patient with his wife and she at length learns to love him. Two years pass and there is but one cloud to her happiness, and that is Robert's drinking. When intoxicated he forgets the consideration due his wife. On a night when her sister Fanny and James have been to the opera with Virginia, Robert comes home intoxicated and, when his wife repulses him, he breaks in her door. Ashamed and repentant the next day, he tries to make amends by presenting a diamond bracelet to his wife. She refuses it, reminding him that during the previous night he said that she was his, "bought and paid for." She tells him that she is going to leave unless he promises never to drink again, but he refuses to make such a promise. When she leaves, he says that he will come when she sends for him, but she says that she will never do that and that he must come to her. James loses his $200 a week position and Virginia has to go to work. James takes things into his own hands and telephones Robert saying that Virginia wants him. Robert, lonely and eager for reconciliation, flies to Virginia. While the truth about James' call comes out, Robert tells Virginia that he has given up drink, bringing about an understanding between them. James also gets his position back.

== Cast ==
- Agnes Ayres as Virginia Blaine
- Jack Holt as Robert Stafford
- Walter Hiers as James Gilley
- Leigh Wyant as Fanny Blaine
- George Kuwa as Oku
- Bernice Frank as Maid
- Ethel Wales as Telegraph Girl

== Preservation ==
With no prints of Bought and Paid For located in any film archives, it is considered a lost film.
