= Burnt Fingers =

1927 film

- Directed by: Maurice S. Campbell
- Written by: G. Marion Burton; Maurice Campbell
- Produced by: J.C. Barnstyn
- Starring: Eileen Percy; Ivan Doline; Edna Murphy
- Cinematography: Harry Stradling Sr.
- Production company: J.C. Barnstyn Productions
- Distributed by: Pathé Exchange
- Release date: February 20, 1927
- Running time: 60 minutes
- Country: United States
- Languages: Silent; English intertitles

Burnt Fingers is a 1927 American mystery film directed by Maurice S. Campbell and starring Eileen Percy, Ivan Doline and Edna Murphy.

A young woman working as a dancer at a nightclub goes to confront a man who is blackmailing her friend with incriminating letters. When he is killed, she comes under suspicion of murder. However it turns out that he was a foreign spy, and she had nothing to do with his slaying.

== Cast ==
- Eileen Percy as Anne Cabell
- Ivan Doline as Stockmar
- Edna Murphy as Vera
- Wilfred Lucas as Lord Cumberly
- George O'Hara as Dick
- Jane Jennings as Mrs. Cabell
- J. Moy Bennett as Mr. Cabell

== Bibliography ==
- Ken Wlaschin. Silent Mystery and Detective Movies: A Comprehensive Filmography. McFarland, 2009.
