= The Invisible Divorce =

1920 film

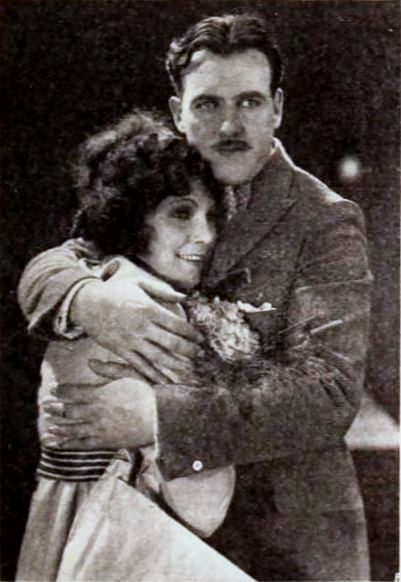
- Still with Leatrice Joy and Walter McGrail
- Directed by: Nat G. Deverich; Thomas R. Mills
- Written by: Katherine S. Reed (scenario)
- Story by: Leila Burton Wells
- Starring: Leatrice Joy
- Cinematography: Max Dupont
- Edited by: Laurence T. Creutz
- Production company: National Picture Theatres
- Distributed by: Select Pictures
- Release date: July 1920
- Running time: six reels
- Country: United States
- Language: Silent (English intertitles)

The Invisible Divorce is a 1920 American silent drama film released by Select Pictures and starring Leatrice Joy. It is not known whether the film currently survives.

== Cast ==
- Leatrice Joy as Pidgie Ryder
- Walter McGrail as Jimmy Ryder
- Walter Miller as John Barry
- Grace Darmond as Claire Kane Barry
- Tom Bates as Pete Carr
