= The Star Dust Trail =

1924 film directed by Edmund Mortimer

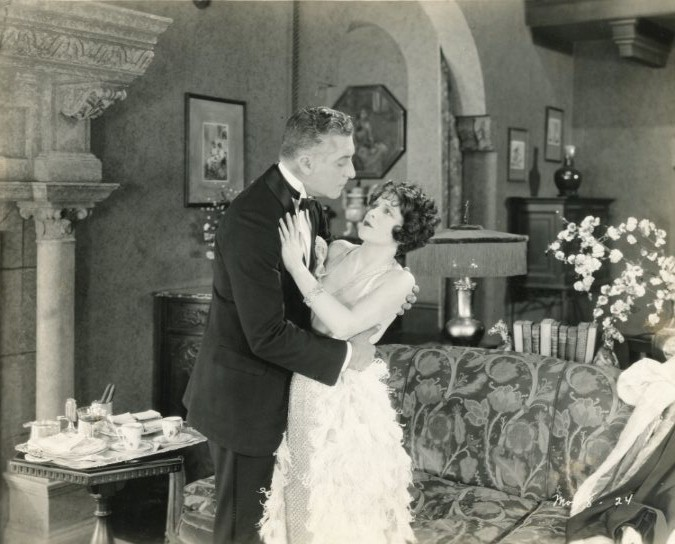
- Directed by: Edmund Mortimer
- Written by: Fanny Hatton; Frederic Hatton; Dorothy Yost
- Produced by: William Fox
- Starring: Shirley Mason; Bryant Washburn; Thomas R. Mills
- Cinematography: Joseph A. Valentine
- Production company: Fox Film
- Distributed by: Fox Film
- Release date: December 28, 1924
- Running time: 50 minutes
- Country: United States
- Languages: Silent; English intertitles

The Star Dust Trail is a 1924 American silent drama film directed by Edmund Mortimer and starring Shirley Mason, Bryant Washburn and Thomas R. Mills. It was produced on a budget of $40,000, but its worldwide box office was disappointing leading to a loss of $17,000 for the studio.

== Cast ==
- Shirley Mason as Sylvia Joy
- Bryant Washburn as John Warding
- Thomas R. Mills as Horace Gibbs
- Richard Tucker as John Benton
- Merta Sterling as The Maid
- Shannon Day as Nan Hartley
- Marion Aye as Girl

== Bibliography ==
- Solomon, Aubrey. The Fox Film Corporation, 1915-1935: A History and Filmography. McFarland, 2011.
