= The Guilty One =

1924 film by Joseph Henabery

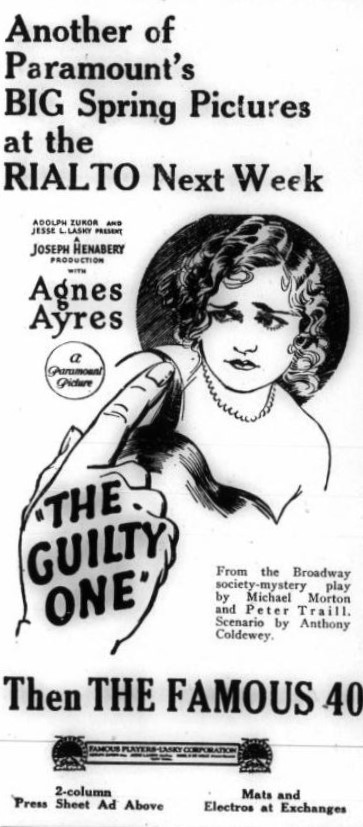
- Advertisement
- Directed by: Joseph Henabery
- Screenplay by: Anthony Coldeway
- Produced by: Adolph Zukor
- Starring: Agnes Ayres; Edmund Burns; Stanley Taylor; Crauford Kent; Cyril Ring; Thomas R. Mills
- Cinematography: Faxon M. Dean
- Production company: Famous Players–Lasky Corporation
- Distributed by: Paramount Pictures
- Release date: June 8, 1924
- Running time: 60 minutes
- Country: United States
- Language: Silent (English intertitles)

The Guilty One is a 1924 American silent mystery film directed by Joseph Henabery and written by Anthony Coldeway. The film stars Agnes Ayres, Edmund Burns, Stanley Taylor, Crauford Kent, Cyril Ring, and Thomas R. Mills. The film was released on June 8, 1924, by Paramount Pictures.

== Cast ==
- Agnes Ayres as Irene Short
- Edmund Burns as Donald Short
- Stanley Taylor as Philip Dupre
- Crauford Kent as Seaton Davies
- Cyril Ring as H. Beverly Graves
- Thomas R. Mills as Sam Maynard
- Catherine Wallace as Bess Maynard
- George Siegmann as Captain
- Clarence Burton as Detective
- Dorothea Wolbert as Anne

== Preservation ==
With no copies of The Guilty One located in any film archives, it is a lost film.
