= Agnes Ayres =

American actress (1892–1940)

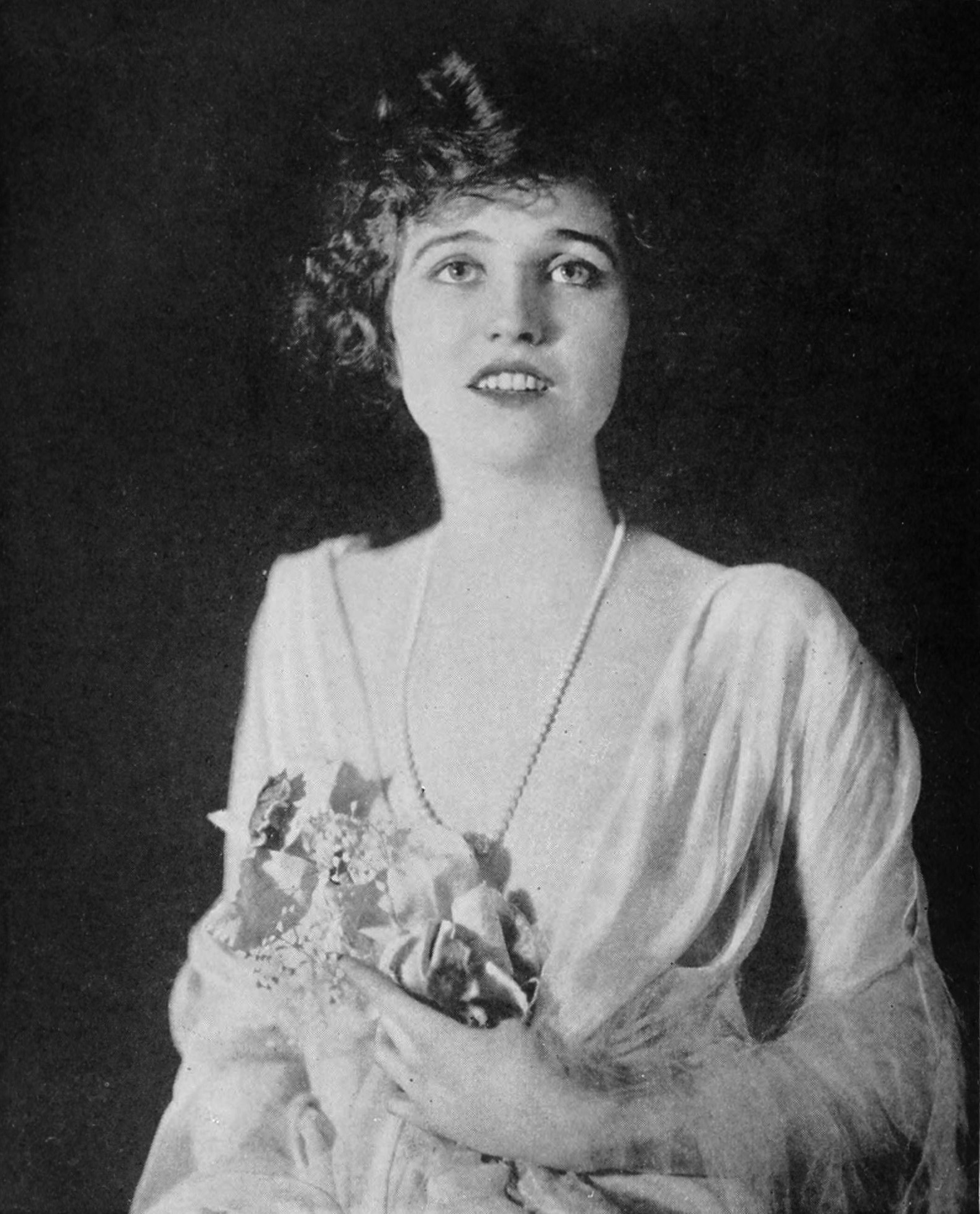
- Ayres, c. 1920
- Born: Agnes Henkel; April 4, 1892; Carbondale, Illinois, U.S.
- Died: December 25, 1940 (aged 48); Los Angeles, California, U.S.
- Resting place: Hollywood Forever Cemetery
- Other names: Agnes Eyre; Agnes Rendleman
- Occupation: Actress
- Years active: 1914–1929, 1936–1937
- Spouses: Frank Schuker (m. 1918; div. 1921) S. Manuel Reachi (m. 1924; div. 1927)
- Children: 1

Agnes Ayres (born Agnes Henkel; April 4, 1892 – December 25, 1940) was an American actress who rose to fame during the period of silent films. She was known for her role as Lady Diana Mayo in The Sheik opposite Rudolph Valentino.

== Career ==
Ayres began her career in 1914 when she was noticed by an Essanay Studios staff director and cast as an extra in a crowd scene. After moving to Manhattan with her mother to pursue a career in acting, Ayres was spotted by actress Alice Joyce. Joyce noticed the physical resemblance the two shared which eventually led to Ayres being cast in Richard the Brazen (1917), as Joyce's character's sister. Ayres' career began to gain momentum when Paramount Pictures founder Jesse Lasky began to take an interest in her. Lasky gave her a starring role in the drama Held by the Enemy (1920), and he lobbied for parts for her in several productions by Cecil B. DeMille. During this period Ayres began a romance with Lasky.

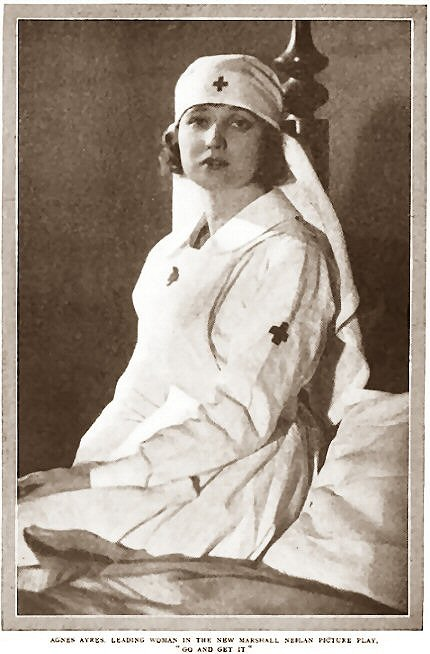
Agnes Ayres as Helen Allen in the 1920 film Go and Get It - Munsey's Magazine, 1920

In 1921, Ayres shot to stardom when she was cast as Lady Diana Mayo, an English heiress, with "Latin lover" Rudolph Valentino in The Sheik. Ayres later reprised her role as Lady Diana in the 1926 sequel The Son of the Sheik. Following the release of The Sheik, she had major roles in many other films, including The Affairs of Anatol (1921) starring Wallace Reid, Forbidden Fruit (1921), and Cecil B. DeMille's The Ten Commandments (1923).

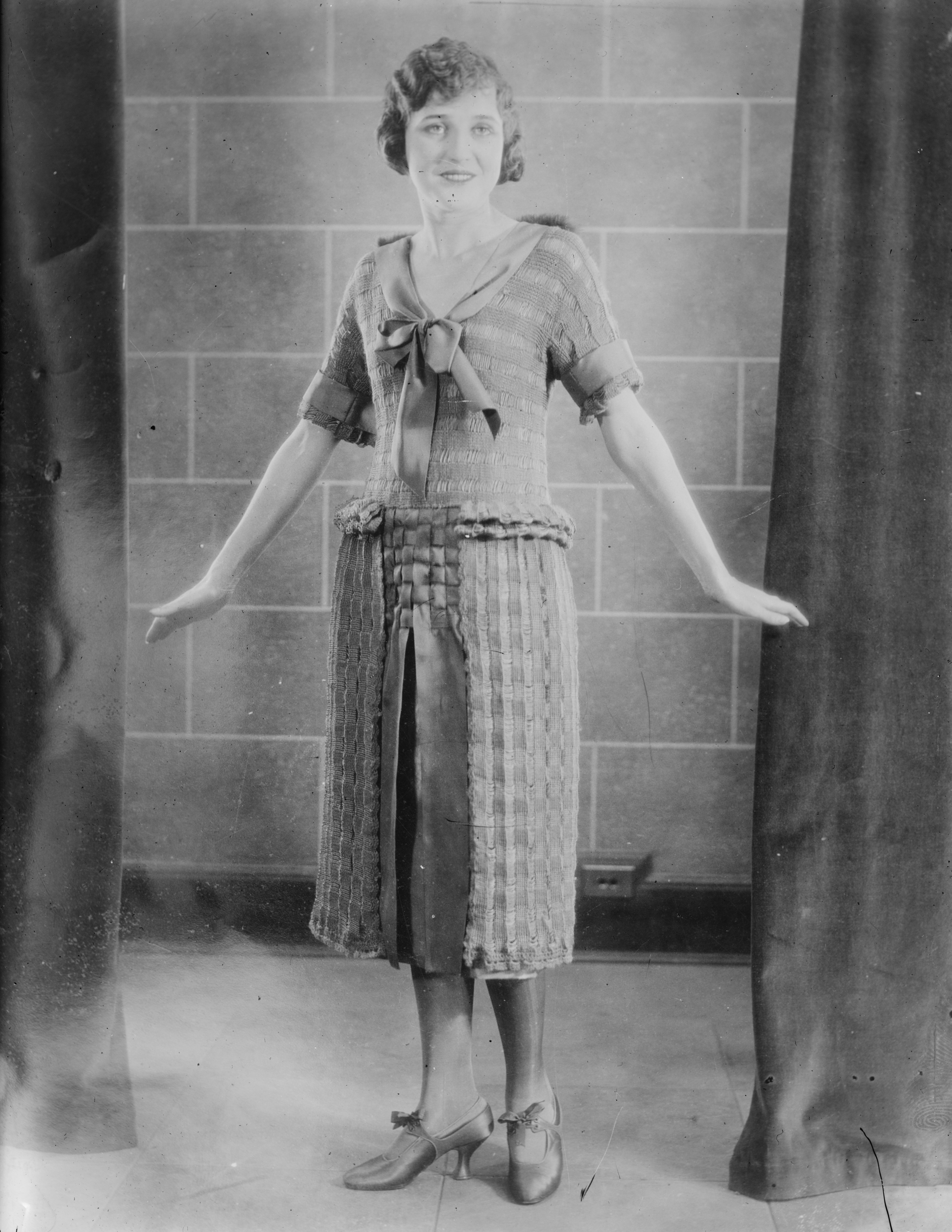
Ayres, c. 1921

By 1923, Ayres' career began to wane following the end of her relationship with Jesse Lasky. She married Mexican diplomat S. Manuel Reachi in 1924. The couple had a daughter, then divorced in 1927.

Ayres lost her fortune and real estate holdings in the Wall Street Crash of 1929. That same year, she also appeared in her last major role in The Donovan Affair, starring Jack Holt. To earn money, she left acting and played the vaudeville circuit. She returned to acting in 1936, confident that she could make a comeback — but, unable to secure starring roles, and somewhat overweight, Ayres appeared in mostly uncredited parts and finally retired from acting in 1937.

== Later years and death ==
After her retirement, Ayres became despondent and was eventually committed to a sanatorium. In 1939, she also lost custody of her daughter, Maria Ayres, to Reachi.

She died from a cerebral hemorrhage on December 25, 1940, at her home in Hollywood, California at the age of 48; she had been ill for several weeks. She is interred at Hollywood Forever Cemetery. In 1960, Ayres was inducted into the Hollywood Walk of Fame with a motion pictures star at 6504 Hollywood Boulevard for her contributions to the film industry.

Her daughter Maria Reachi had a small part in the movie East Side, West Side (1949).

== Selected filmography ==
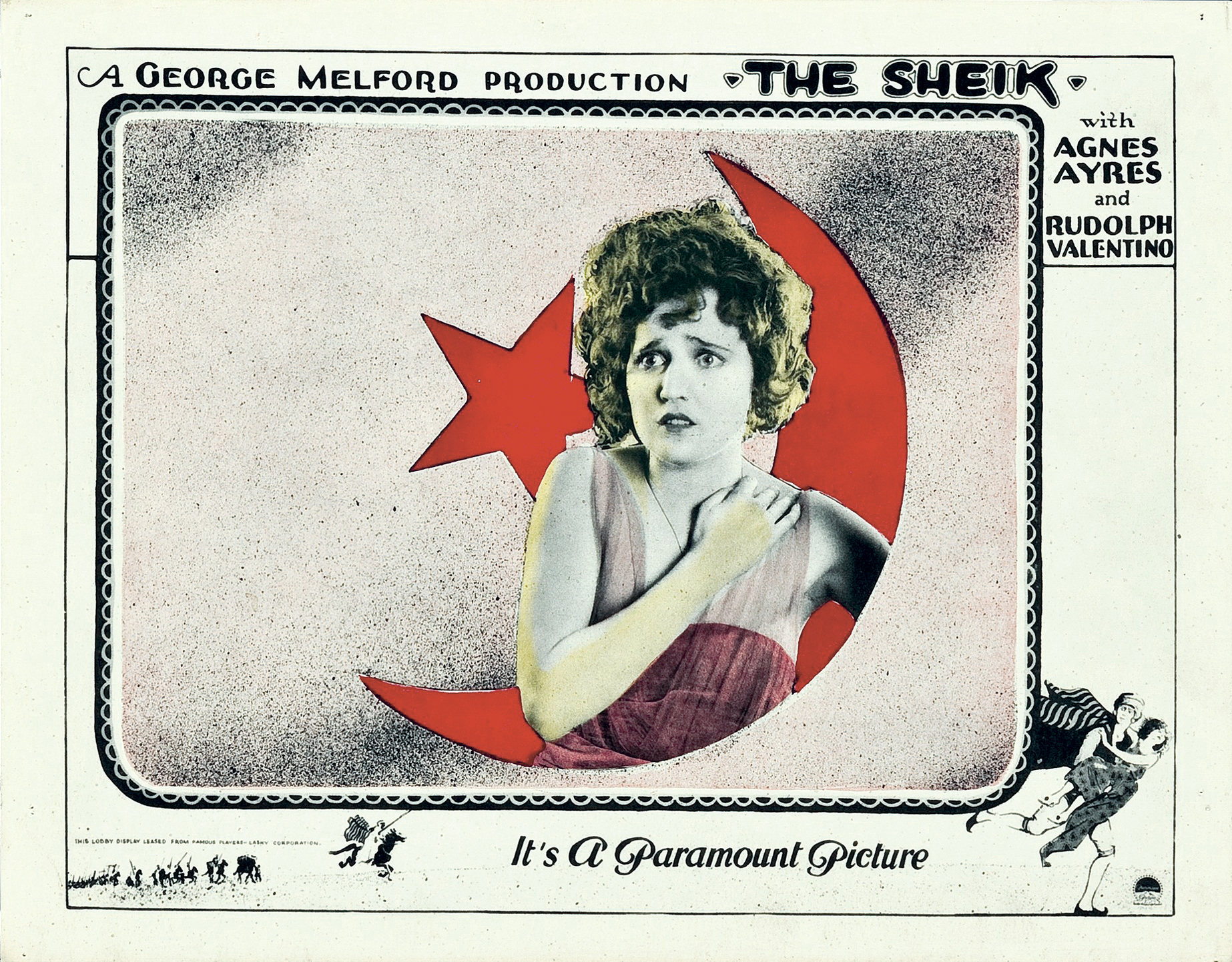
Ayres on a lobby card for The Sheik

Year	Title	Role	Notes
1914	The Masked Wrestler		Uncredited
1915	His New Job	Extra, Secretary	Alternative title: Charlie's New Job
1917	Motherhood	The Mother	Credited as Agnes Eyre; Lost film
1917	The Debt	Countess Ann	Credited as Agnes Eyre; Lost film
1917	Mrs. Balfame	Alys Crumley	Credited as Agnes Eyre
1917	Hedda Gabler		Credited as Agnes Eyre
1917	The Mirror	undetermined	Credited as Agnes Eyre; Lost film
1917	The Dazzling Miss Davison	Lillian, Miss Davison's sister	Credited as Agnes Eyre; Lost film
1917	The Defeat of the City	Alicia Van Der Pool	Credited as Agnes Eyre
1917	The Bottom of the Well	Alice Buckingham	Lost film
1918	The Purple Dress	Maida	*short
1918	The Enchanted Profile	Ida Bates	
1918	Sisters of the Golden Circle	Mrs. James Williams	
1918	One Thousand Dollars	Margarett Hayden	
1919	The Girl Problem	Helen Reeves	
1919	A Stitch in Time	Lela Trevor	
1919	In Honor's Web	Carson	Lost film
1919	Sacred Silence		Lost film
1919	The Gamblers	Isabel Merson	
1920	A Modern Salome	Helen Torrence	Lost film
1920	The Inner Voice	Barbara	Survives; Library of Congress, Cineteca Nazionale
1920	Go and Get It	Helen Allen	Survives; Cineteca Nazionale
1920	Held by the Enemy	Rachel Hayne	Lost film
1921	The Love Special	Laura Gage	Survives
1921	Forbidden Fruit	Mary Maddock	Survives
1921	Too Much Speed	Virginia MacMurran	Unknown/presumably Lost
1921	Cappy Ricks	Florrie Ricks	Incomplete film
1921	The Affairs of Anatol	Annie Elliott	Survives
1921	The Sheik	Lady Diana Mayo	Survives
1922	The Lane That Had No Turning	Madelinette	Lost film
1922	Bought and Paid For	Virginia Blaine	Lost film
1922	The Ordeal	Sybil Bruce	Lost film
1922	A Daughter of Luxury	Mary Fenton	Lost film
1922	Clarence	Violet Pinney	Lost film
1923	The Heart Raider	Muriel Gray (a speed girl)	
1923	Racing Hearts	Virginia Kent	Lost film
1923	The Ten Commandments	The Outcast	Survives
1923	The Marriage Maker	Alexandra Vancy	Lost film
1923	Don't Call It Love	Alice Meldrum	Lost film
1923	Hollywood	Herself (cameo)	Lost film
1924	When a Girl Loves	Sasha Boroff	Survives
1924	Bluff	Betty Hallowell	Survives
1924	The Guilty One	Irene Short	Lost
1924	Detained		Short film Survives
1924	The Story Without a Name	Mary Walsworth	Lost film
1925	Tomorrow's Love	Judith Stanley	Lost film
1925	Her Market Value	Nancy Dumont	Survives
1925	The Awful Truth	Lucy Satterlee	Survives
1925	Morals for Men	Bessie Hayes	Survives
1926	The Son of the Sheik	Lady Diana	Survives
1927	Eve's Love Letters	The Wife	Survives; *short
1928	Into the Night	Billie Mardon	Lost film
1929	The Donovan Affair	Lydia Rankin	? Survives
1929	Bye, Bye, Buddy	Glad O'Brien	Lost film
1936	Small Town Girl	Catherine	Uncredited
1937	Maid of Salem	Bit Part	Uncredited
1937	Midnight Taxi	Society woman	Uncredited
1937	Souls at Sea	Bit Role	Uncredited
1937	Morning Judge	Mrs. Kennedy	
