= The Ordeal (film) =

1922 film by Paul Powell

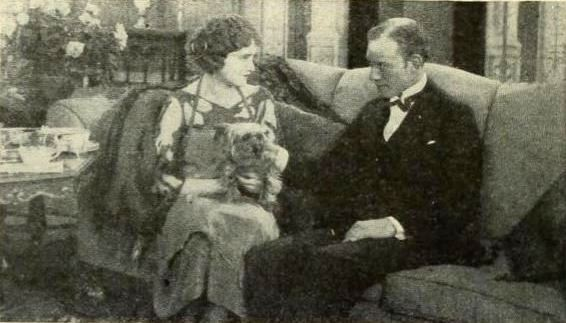
- Still with Agnes Ayres and Conrad Nagel
- Directed by: Paul Powell
- Screenplay by: Beulah Marie Dix; W. Somerset Maugham
- Produced by: Adolph Zukor
- Starring: Clarence Burton; Agnes Ayres; Conrad Nagel; Edna Murphy; Anne Schaefer; Gino Corrado; Adele Farrington
- Cinematography: Harry Perry
- Production company: Famous Players–Lasky Corporation
- Distributed by: Paramount Pictures
- Release date: May 21, 1922
- Running time: 50 minutes
- Country: United States
- Language: Silent (English intertitles)

The Ordeal is a lost 1922 American silent drama film directed by Paul Powell and written by Beulah Marie Dix and W. Somerset Maugham. The film stars Clarence Burton, Agnes Ayres, Conrad Nagel, Edna Murphy, Anne Schaefer, Gino Corrado, and Adele Farrington. The film was released on May 21, 1922, by Paramount Pictures.

== Plot ==
As described in a film magazine, Sybil Bruce agreed to a marriage with her older drunken and abusive husband George Bruce to provide for her invalid sister and young brother. The husband's physician Dr. Robert Acton is regarded as a rival and is not permitted in the house. A will is drafted that stipulates that the wife will forfeit her claim to the husband's wealth if she remarries after his death. When the husband dies, Sybil believes that in failing to provide him his medicine, she had murdered him. The money she inherits allows her to pay for an operation that restores her sister's health. But her sister becomes headstrong and wasteful, and her younger brother follows the same path. Dr. Robert Acton returns, but the sister and brother prevent the natural marriage. There is a big scene at a roadhouse where an aged, former family nurse saves Sybil and tells her that she poisoned the deceased husband. There follows a happy ending with Sybil and the doctor.

== Cast ==
- Agnes Ayres as Sybil Bruce
- Clarence Burton as George Bruce
- Conrad Nagel as Dr. Robert Acton
- Edna Murphy as Helen Brayshaw
- Anne Schaefer as Minnie
- Gino Corrado as Gene
- Adele Farrington as Madame St. Levis
- Edward Martindel as Sir Francis Maynard
- Shannon Day as Kitty
- Claire Du Brey as Elise
- A. Edward Sutherland as Victim
