= Racing Hearts =

1923 film by Paul Powell

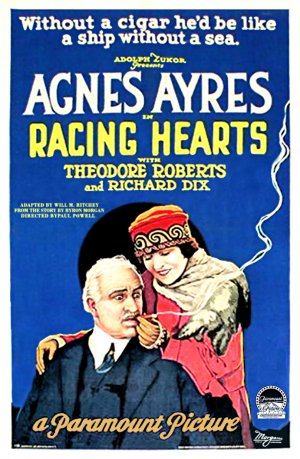
- Theatrical release poster
- Directed by: Paul Powell
- Screenplay by: Byron Morgan; Will M. Ritchey
- Produced by: Jesse L. Lasky; Adolph Zukor
- Starring: Agnes Ayres; Richard Dix; Theodore Roberts; Robert Cain; Warren Rogers; J. Farrell MacDonald; Ed Brady
- Cinematography: Bert Baldridge
- Production company: Famous Players–Lasky Corporation
- Distributed by: Paramount Pictures
- Release date: July 15, 1923
- Running time: 60 minutes
- Country: United States
- Language: Silent (English intertitles)

Racing Hearts is a 1923 American silent comedy drama film directed by Paul Powell and written by Byron Morgan and Will M. Ritchey. The film stars Agnes Ayres, Richard Dix, Theodore Roberts, Robert Cain, Warren Rogers, J. Farrell MacDonald, and Ed Brady. The film was released on July 15, 1923, by Paramount Pictures.

== Plot ==
As described in a film magazine review, Virginia Kent believes that her father's automobile business needs publicity to save it from ruin. She tricks him into consenting to have a special car made for the race. She meets Robby Smith, the son of the owner of a rival business, and a love affair develops between the two. The selected driver of the car, Fred Claxton, has been bribed by the rival concern, and just before the race is set to begin tries to quit. Virginia takes his place and drives the car to victory with the assistance of Robby, who drives one of his father's cars.

== Cast ==
- Agnes Ayres as Virginia Kent
- Richard Dix as Robby Smith
- Theodore Roberts as John Kent
- Robert Cain as Fred Claxton
- Warren Rogers as Jimmy Britt
- J. Farrell MacDonald as Silas Martin
- Ed Brady as Pete Delaney (credited as Edwin J. Brady)
- Fred J. Butler as Burton Smith
- Robert Brower as Horatio Whipple
- Kalla Pasha as Mechanic
- James A. Murphy as Racing Driver
- Johnny Wonderlich as Racing Driver
- Eddie Hefferman as Racing Driver

== Preservation ==
With no prints of Racing Hearts located in any film archives, it is a lost film.
