= Fury (1923 film) =

1923 film by Henry King

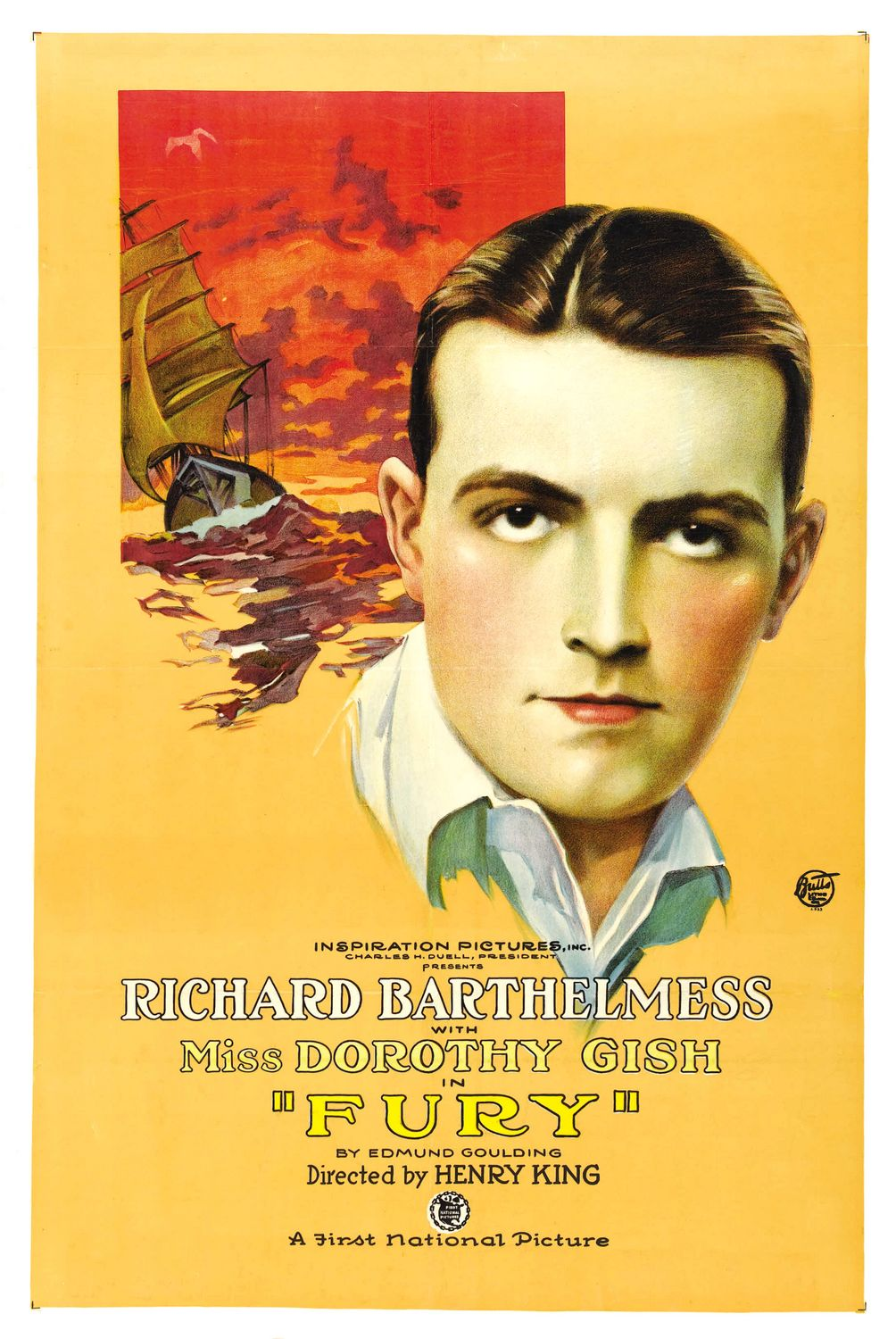
- 1923 lobby poster
- Directed by: Henry King
- Written by: Edmund Goulding (original story and scenario)
- Produced by: Richard Barthelmess (Inspiration Pictures)
- Starring: Richard Barthelmess; Dorothy Gish; Tyrone Power
- Cinematography: Roy Overbaugh
- Edited by: W. Duncan Mansfield
- Distributed by: Associated First National (*later First National)
- Release date: January 1, 1923
- Running time: 9 reels; 8,709 feet
- Country: United States
- Language: Silent (English intertitles)

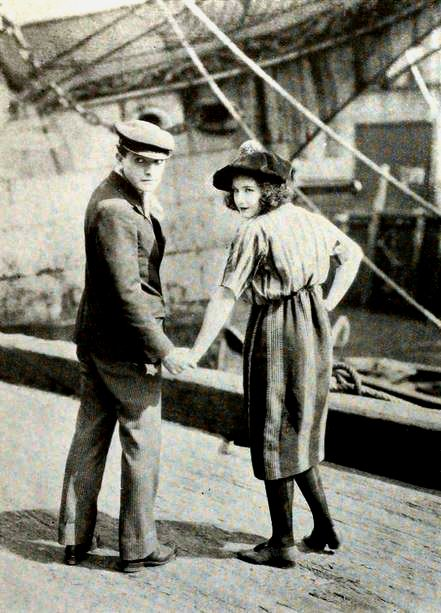
'Dick' Barthelmess and 'Dottie' Gish.

Fury is a 1923 American silent drama adventure film produced by and starring Richard Barthelmess. It was directed by Henry King and released through First National Pictures which was then called Associated First National.

The synopsis of this film has a strange foreboding character concerning actor Tyrone Power, whose character Captain Leyton dies of heart attack, leaving his son, called 'Boy' played by Barthelmess, to carry on. In real life actor Power would die of a heart attack in 1931 in the arms of his own son Tyrone Power, the later film star.

== Plot ==
As described in a film magazine, Boy Leyton is second mate on board the Lady Spray, the ship on which his father is Captain Leyton. Boy is often chided by his father for his effeminacy and more often beaten. While in port Boy proposes to Minnie and suggests that she go to Glasgow to meet him there to be married. The ship sails and the Captain learns of his son's intention to marry. He calls him in and tells him about his mother, who deserted him, and tries to turn him away from all women, but Boy refuses to listen. The Captain is suddenly taken ill, but before he dies he makes Boy promise that he will not marry until he has found the man who wronged his mother. The Captain is buried at sea and the ship continues on its course. Upon reaching Glasgow Boy tells Minnie what happened. While at the bar, he meets an old woman who comes in begging. During the conversation he discovers that she is his mother, and he forces her to tell him who her betrayer was. Boy learns that it was the first mate from his father's ship who is now its captain. He finds the man and, though greatly outweighed, he finally succeeds in knocking him down. The stunned man falls from the ship into the sea and disappears. When the ship goes back into port, Boy and Minnie are married.

== Cast ==
- Richard Barthelmess as Boy Leyton
- Tyrone Power Sr. as Captain Leyton
- Pat Hartigan as Morgan
- Barry Macollum as Looney Luke
- Dorothy Gish as Minnie
- Jessie Arnold as Boy's Mother
- Harry Blakemore as Mr. Hop
- Adolph Milar as Yuka
- Ivan Linow as Zece
- Emily Fitzroy as Matilda Brent
- Lucia Backus Seger as Mrs. Ross
- Patterson Dial as Looney Luke's Girl

== Preservation ==
It is not known whether Fury currently survives, suggesting that it is a lost film.
