= Forbidden Fruit (1921 film) =

1921 film

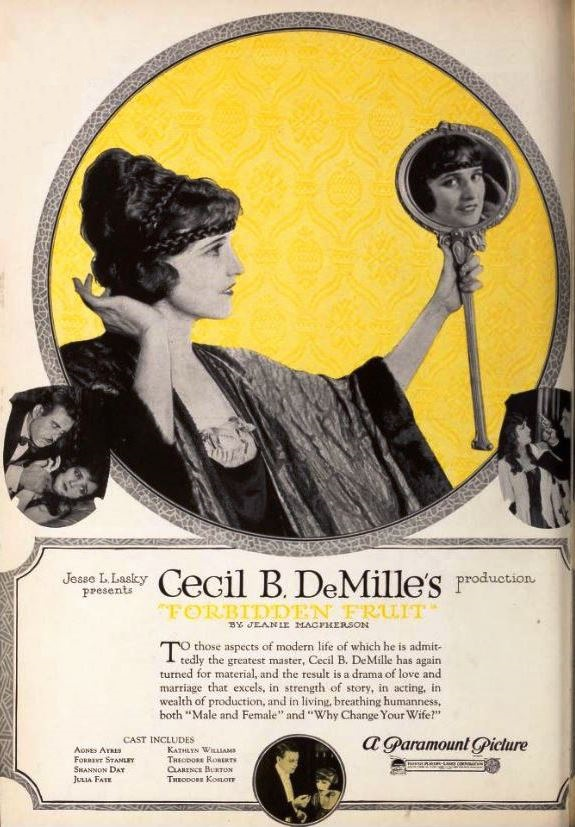
- Advertisement for the film from a 1921 issue of Exhibitors Herald
- Directed by: Cecil B. DeMille
- Screenplay by: Jeanie MacPherson
- Based on: "The Golden Chance" by Cecil B. DeMille and Jeanie MacPherson
- Produced by: Cecil B. DeMille
- Starring: Agnes Ayres; Clarence Burton; Theodore Roberts; Kathlyn Williams
- Cinematography: Alvin Wyckoff; Karl Struss
- Edited by: Anne Bauchens
- Music by: Hugo Riesenfeld
- Production company: Famous Players–Lasky
- Distributed by: Paramount Pictures
- Release date: January 23, 1921
- Running time: 87 minutes
- Country: United States
- Language: Silent (English intertitles)

Forbidden Fruit

Forbidden Fruit is a 1921 American silent drama film directed by Cecil B. DeMille, and starring Agnes Ayres, Forrest Stanley, Clarence Burton, and Kathlyn Williams. It is a remake of the 1915 film The Golden Chance, which was also directed by DeMille. It was used handschiegl Color Insert Used To Intro, Credits, And Outro.

== Plot ==
Mrs. Mallory persuades Mary Maddock, her unhappily married seamstress, to take the place of an absent guest at her dinner party so that her husband can complete a business deal with Nelson Rogers rather than make his trip out West. Gorgeously gowned and very beautiful, Mary wins the heart of Nelson at the party, who asks her to marry him. Mary realizes what she is missing and remains faithful to her abusive and idle husband Steve Maddock, whom she supports. After a final insult from him (throwing a shoe at her bird that knocks the cage out a window to its death), she remains with the Mallorys, who need her for a weekend with Nelson. During that night she is awakened to find a burglar, her husband, stealing Mrs. Mallory's jewels. Steve escapes but Mary tells the Mallorys that the thief was her husband. She refuses the Mallorys' suggestion to divorce Steve who then attempts to blackmail Nelson for $10,000, which he plans to divide with a crooked partner (the butler of the Mallorys). In a fight over the money, the partner kills Steve, leaving Mary free to marry Nelson.

== Cast ==
- Agnes Ayres as Mary Maddock
- Clarence Burton as Steve Maddock
- Theodore Roberts as James Harrington Mallory
- Kathlyn Williams as Mrs. Mallory
- Forrest Stanley as Nelson Rogers
- Theodore Kosloff as Pietro Giuseppe
- Shannon Day as Nadia Craig
- Bertram Johns as John Craig
- Julia Faye as Maid
- William Boyd (uncredited)

== Preservation ==
Prints of Forbidden Fruit are held by:

- George Eastman Museum,
- Library of Congress, on 35 mm film,
- Museum Of Modern Art,
- UCLA Film and Television Archive, and
- Gosfilmofond.
