= The Affairs of Anatol =

1921 film by Cecil B. DeMille

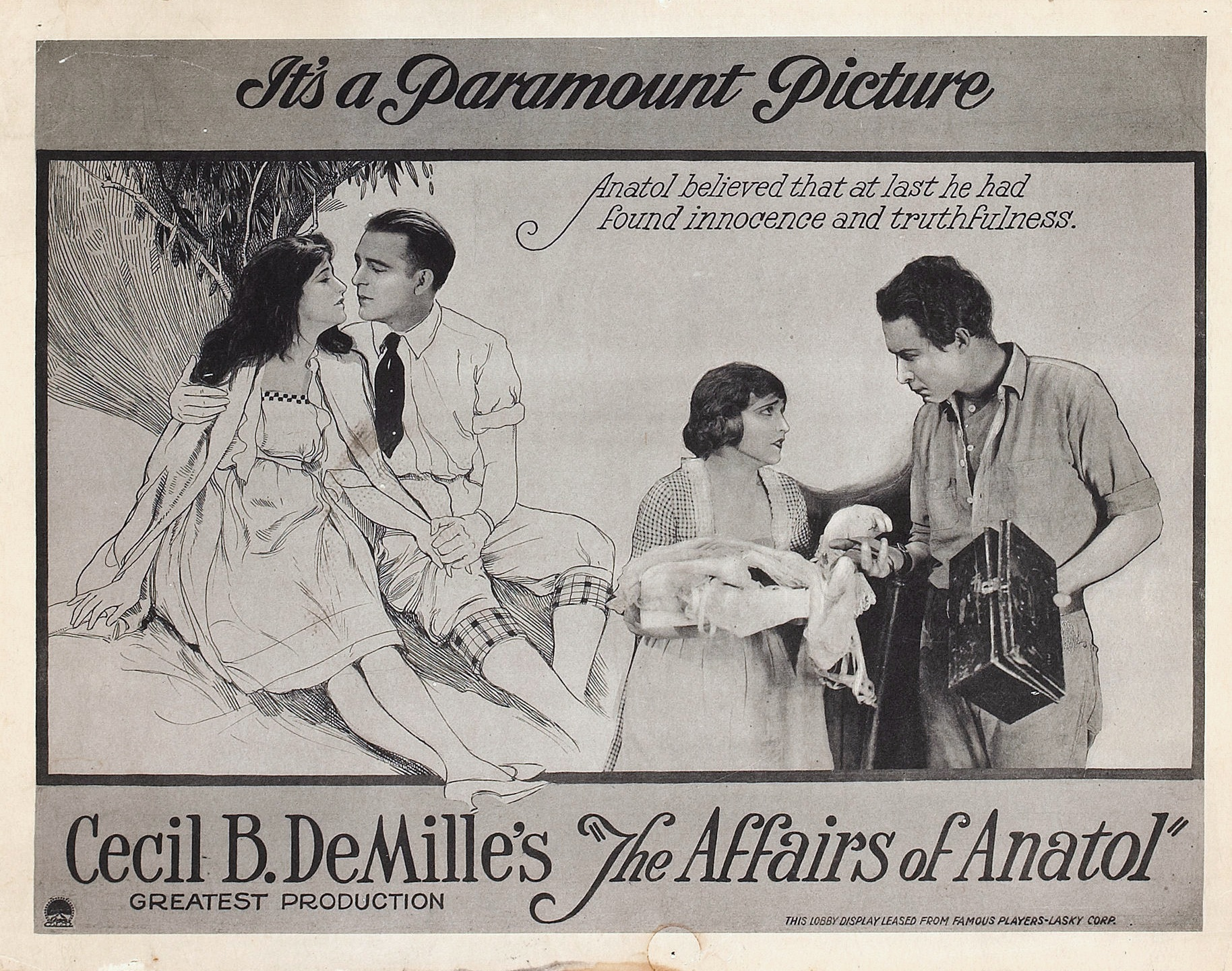
- Lobby card
- Directed by: Cecil B. DeMille (uncredited)
- Written by: Jeanie Macpherson
- Based on: Anatol (1893 play) by Arthur Schnitzler
- Produced by: Cecil B. DeMille; Jesse L. Lasky
- Starring: Wallace Reid; Gloria Swanson; Elliott Dexter
- Cinematography: Karl Struss; Alvin Wyckoff
- Edited by: Anne Bauchens
- Music by: Brian Benison (2000 DVD Release)
- Production company: Famous Players–Lasky
- Distributed by: Paramount Pictures
- Release date: September 21, 1921
- Running time: 117 minutes
- Country: United States
- Language: Silent (English intertitles)
- Budget: $176,508
- Box office: $1.2 million

The Affairs of Anatol

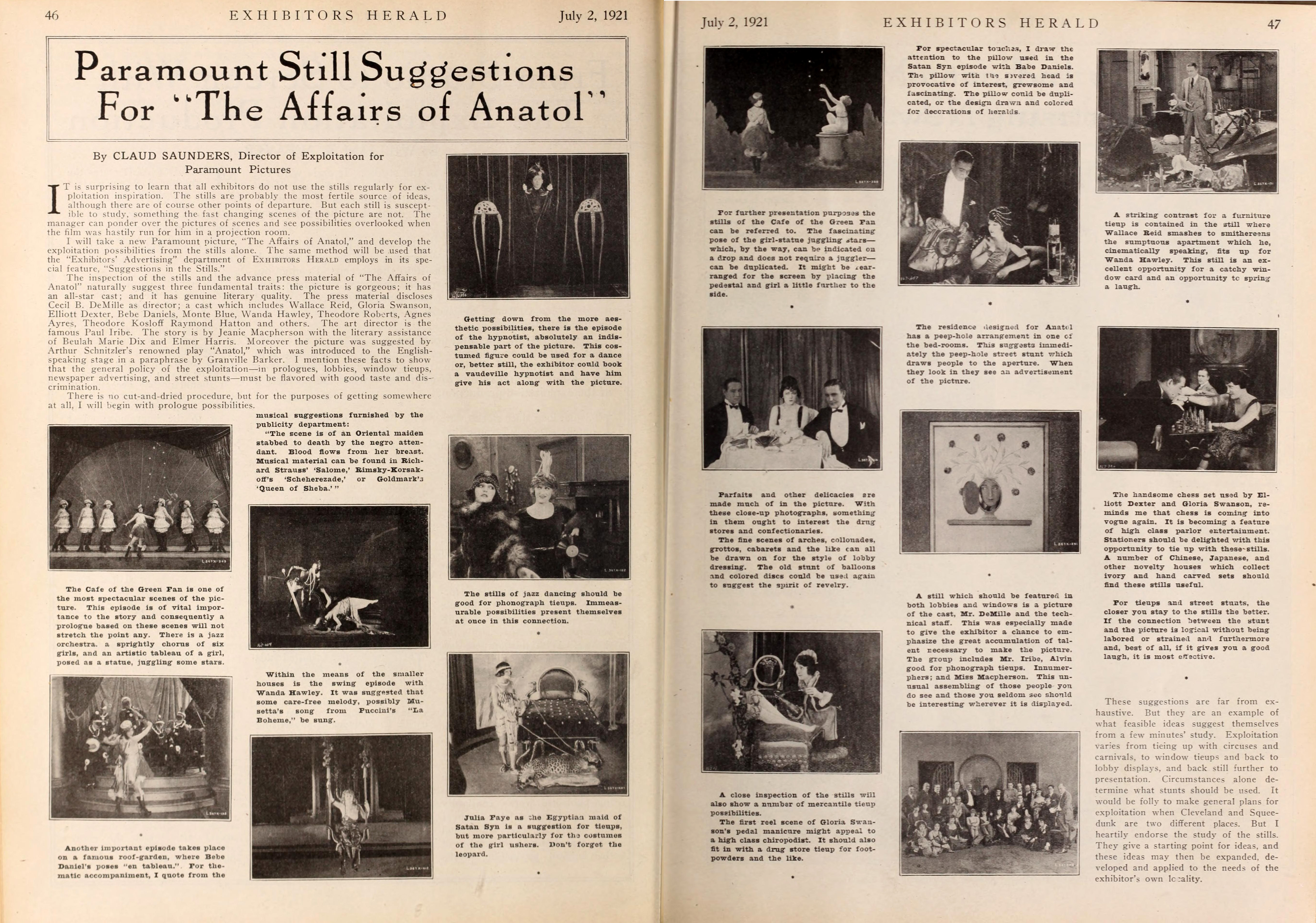
Films stills and suggestions of advertising use

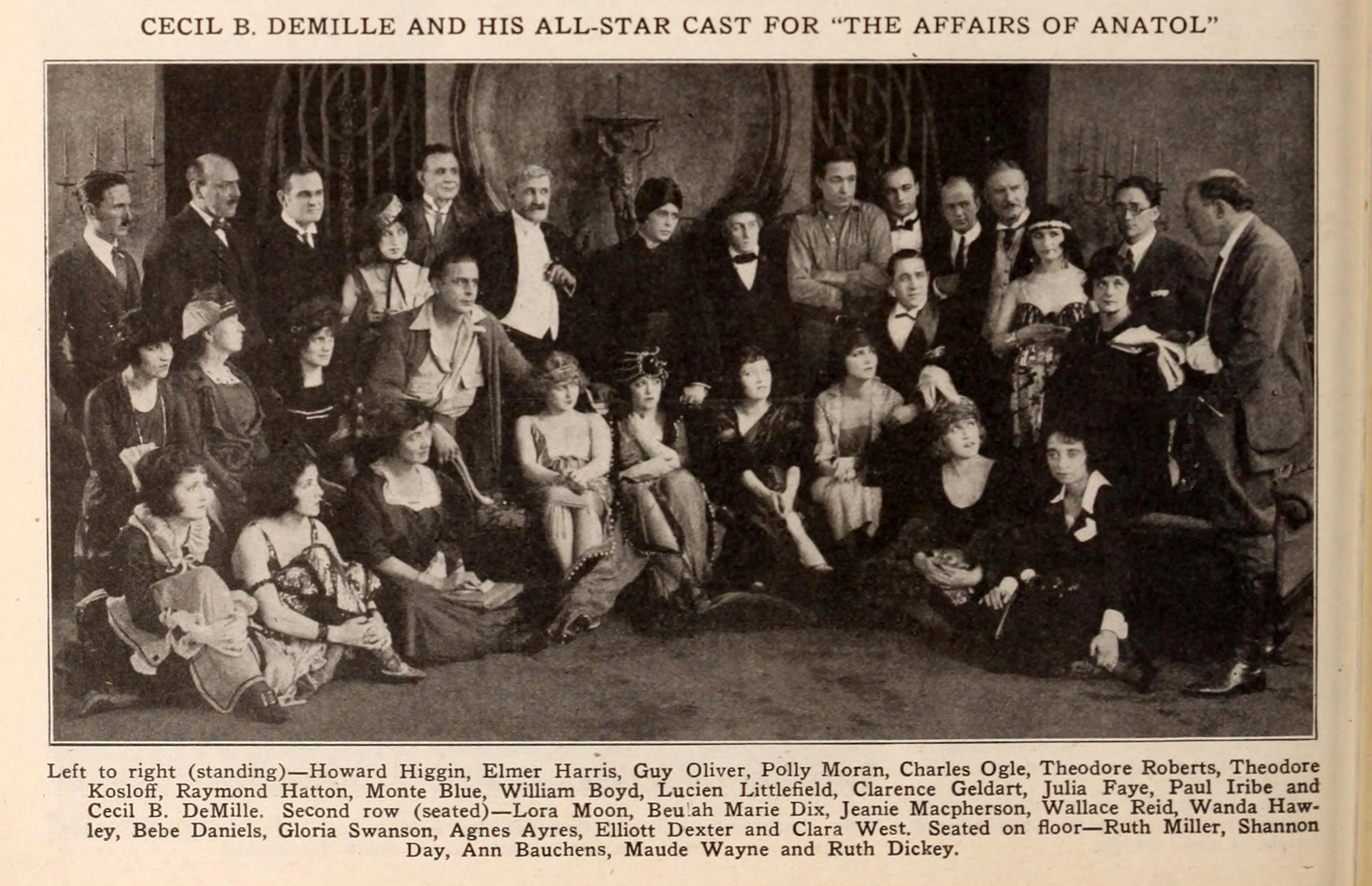
The film's cast

The Affairs of Anatol is a 1921 American silent comedy-drama film directed by Cecil B. DeMille, starring Wallace Reid and Gloria Swanson. The film is based on the 1893 play Anatol by Arthur Schnitzler. It was adapted by Jeanie MacPherson for the screen with assistance from Beulah Marie Dix and Elmer Harris. Art direction for the film was done by Paul Iribe. Handschiegl Color Sequence From Intro, Credit Or Dialogues, And Outro While Their Scenes Is only from black and white.

== Plot ==
Socialite Anatol Spencer, finding his relationship with his wife Vivian lackluster, goes in search of excitement.

After bumping into old flame Emilie Dixon at a nightclub, Anatol promises to "rescue" her from her soulless city lifestyle, which lecherous theatrical backer Gordon Bronson has enabled. Anatol convinces Emilie to discard the jewelry that Bronson has given her, but refuses to give up his wife in turn. Emilie invites Bronson and others to a party at the apartment. When Anatol finds out, he trashes the room and leaves Emilie to her fate: marriage to Bronson. With the affair over, Anatol tells Vivian to promise to stop him the next time he attempts to "rescue" a woman.

Some time later, Anatol and Vivian throw a party, with Hindu hypnotist Nazzer Singh acting as entertainment. Singh hypnotizes Vivian into believing that she is wading through a stream, and she begins undressing. Disgusted with the hypocrisies of high society (which has shown itself to not be much better than Emilie and Bronson's world), Anatol decides to move with his wife to the countryside.

Meanwhile, farmer Abner Elliott discovers that his wife Annie has purchased a dress using money stolen from his lockbox of church funds. He rebuffs her and sends her away, resolving to take the blame for the theft. Repenting, Annie throws herself off of a bridge into a river just as Anatol and Vivian are rowing past in a boat. The two quickly bring her to shore and, after realizing that they cannot wake her up, Vivian takes their car to find a local doctor. Anatol finds that Annie is awake and she manipulates him into letting her take his wallet. When Vivian returns with the doctor, Annie is kissing Anatol, not knowing that he is married. As Annie leaves to make amends with her husband (lying about how she obtained the money), Anatol, now disillusioned with the country life as well, asks the doctor where he can find "honesty and loyalty". The doctor responds that those qualities, like charity, "start at home".

Anatol and Vivian return to the city, where Vivian plans to leave her husband for his perceived infidelity. The two separately go out to enjoy the nightlife and forgot their troubles. Anatol meets Satan Synne, an infamously devilish performer. He offers to go home with her, but she only accepts after receiving a telephone call from a Dr. Johnston. At Synne's apartment, she offers Anatol a drink that impairs judgment and asks him for three thousand dollars. After she faints upon receiving another call from Dr. Johnston, it is revealed that Synne's immoral lifestyle is only a means to gather money to pay for expensive surgeries for her husband, a dying World War I veteran. Anatol gives her the three thousand dollars and leaves as she falls to her knees in prayer.

Anatol returns home, finding that Vivian is still out on the town. She eventually returns with his best friend Max Runyon, whom she has been spending more time with while her husband is busy. When Max is evasive about whether she has been unfaithful, Anatol convinces Singh (who is leaving the United States) to hypnotize Vivian into truthfully answering the question of whether she has been. Ultimately, Anatol decides that he trusts his wife too much to accuse her of cheating and breaks the trance. The two happily embrace and kiss.

== Cast ==
- Wallace Reid as Anatol DeWitt Spencer
- Gloria Swanson as Vivian Spencer
- Wanda Hawley as Emilie Dixon
- Theodore Roberts as Gordon Bronson
- Elliott Dexter as Max Runyon
- Theodore Kosloff as Mr. Nazzer Singh
- Agnes Ayres as Annie Elliott
- Monte Blue as Abner Elliott
- Bebe Daniels as Satan Synne

=== Uncredited ===
- Alma Bennett as Chorus Girl
- William Boyd as Guest
- Shannon Day as Chorus Girl
- Julia Faye as Tibra
- Elinor Glyn as Bridge Player
- Winter Hall as Dr. Johnston
- Raymond Hatton as Great Blatsky (Violin Teacher)
- Fred Huntley as Stage Manager
- Lucien Littlefield as Spencer's Valet
- Zelma Maja as Nurse
- Ruth Miller as Marie, the Spencers' Maid
- Polly Moran as Orchestra Leader
- Charles Stanton Ogle as Dr. Bowles
- Guy Oliver as the Spencers' Butler

== Background ==
The screenplay was based on a one-act play called Anatol written by Arthur Schnitzler in 1893 and translated into English by Harley Granville-Barker. The play opened in New York City on October 14, 1912, with John Barrymore in the title role, and ran for 72 performances.

== Preservation ==
Complete prints of The Affairs of Anatol are held by:

- Cinematheque Royale de Belgique,
- Munich Film Archive,
- Filmoteka Narodowa in Warsaw,
- George Eastman Museum, on 35 mm film,
- Library of Congress, on 35 mm, 16 mm and video,
- UCLA Film and Television Archive, on 35 and 16 mm, and
- Gosfilmofond.

Film Preservation Associates copyrighted a version of the film in 1999 with a musical score composed and performed by Brian Benison. The film was later produced for VHS by David Shepard of FPA with a runtime of 117 minutes, and subsequently issued as a DVD.

Sam Wood apparently created Don't Tell Everything (1921), also starring Swanson, Reid, and Dexter, in part using outtakes left over from The Affairs of Anatol.

== See also ==
- Wallace Reid filmography
