= List of Vitagraph Studios films =

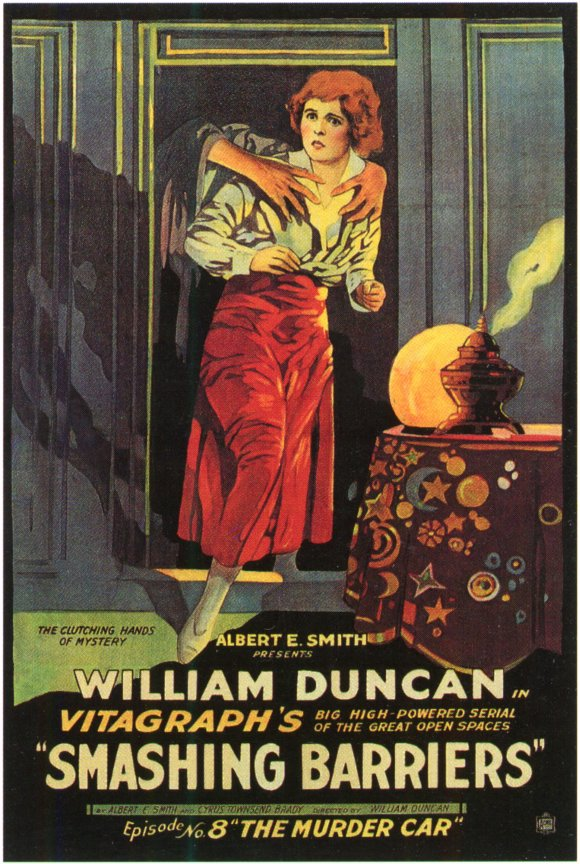
Smashing Barriers (1919)

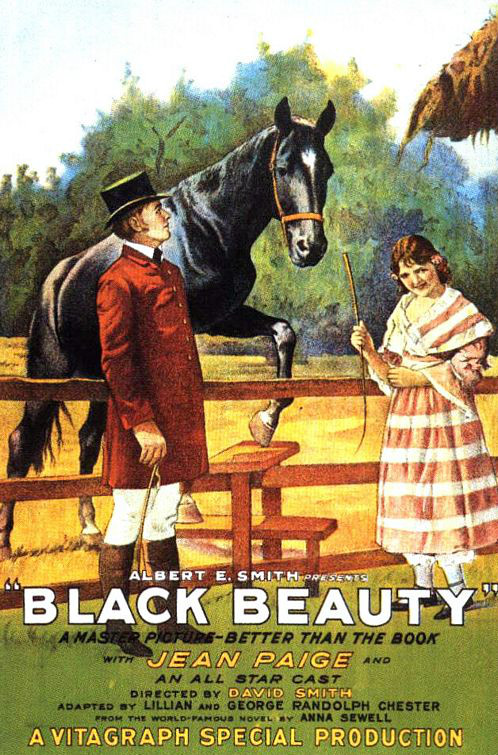
Black Beauty (1921)

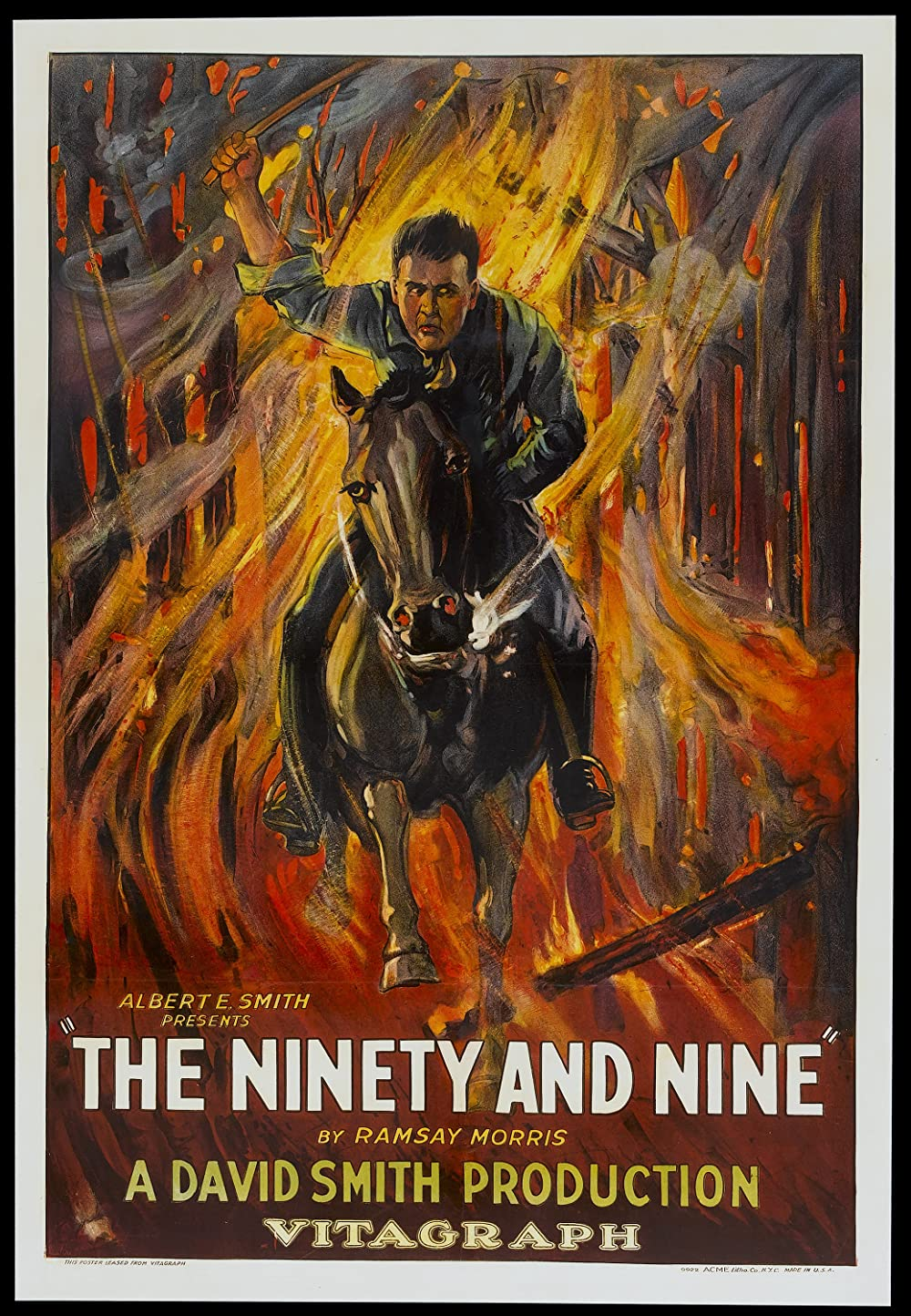
The Ninety and Nine (1922)

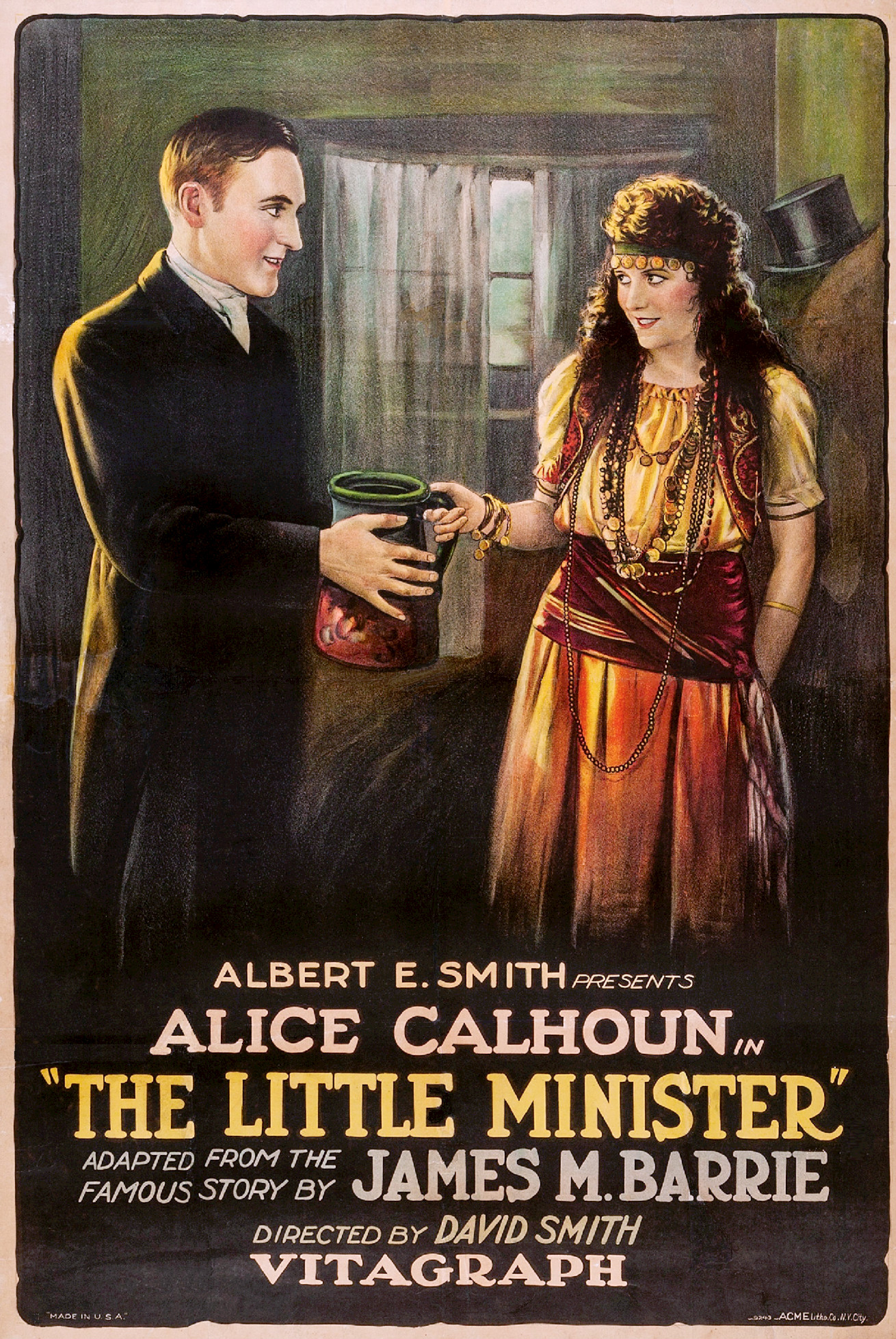
The Little Minister (1922)

List of feature films produced by Vitagraph Studios from 1910 until 1925, when it was absorbed into Warner Bros. The company also produced numerous short films during the era.

== 1910s ==
Title	Release date	Director	Notes
A Tale of Two Cities	February 21–25, 1911	William J. Humphrey	
Vanity Fair	December 19, 1911	Charles Kent	
Some Good in All	December 25, 1911	Maurice Costello, Robert Gaillard	
The Adventure of the Italian Model	1912	Dir. Van Dyke Brooke, Maurice Costello (as Lambert Chase). Original script: Bertram Brooker	fragment
The Adventure of a Thumb Print	1912	Dir. Van Dyke Brooke, Maurice Costello (as Lambert Chase). Original script: Bertram Brooker	
The Pickwick Papers	1913	Laurence Trimble	
The Mystery of the Seven Jewels	1913	Dir. Van Dyke Brooke, Maurice Costello (as Lambert Chase). Original script: Bertram Brooker	
A Million Bid	February 7, 1914	Ralph Ince	lost
The Christian	March 16, 1914	Frederick A. Thomson	lost
Mr. Barnes of New York	May 1, 1914	Maurice Costello, Robert Gaillard	lost
My Official Wife	July 13, 1914	James Young	lost
A Florida Enchantment	August 10, 1914	Sidney Drew	extant
The Painted World	August 10, 1914	Ralph Ince	lost
The Strange Story of Sylvia Gray	October 26, 1914	Charles L. Gaskill	lost
Too Many Husbands	September 28, 1914	Sidney Drew	
The Little Angel of Canyon Creek	November 9, 1914	Rollin S. Sturgeon	lost
The Sins of the Mothers	December 27, 1914	Ralph Ince	lost
Mother's Roses	January 3, 1915	Theodore Marston	lost
Hearts and the Highway	January 17, 1915	Wilfrid North	lost
The Island of Regeneration	January 31, 1915	Harry Davenport	lost
The Wheels of Justice	February 14, 1915	Theodore Marston	lost
The Juggernaut	March 7, 1915	Ralph Ince	incomplete, 2 reels of 5
The Chalice of Courage	May 2, 1915	Rollin S. Sturgeon	lost
The Goddess	May 9, 1915	Ralph Ince	lost
The Battle Cry of Peace	August 6, 1915	J. Stuart Blackton, Wilfrid North	fragment
Mortmain	September 6, 1915	Theodore Marston	lost
Playing Dead	September 20, 1915	Sidney Drew	extant
The Dust of Egypt	October 4, 1915	George D. Baker	lost
The Man Who Couldn't Beat God	October 18, 1915	Maurice Costello, Robert Gaillard	lost
The Turn of the Road	November 1, 1915	Tefft Johnson	lost
Anselo Lee	November 6, 1915	Harry Handworth	
The Heights of Hazard	November 15, 1915	Harry Lambart	lost
The Cave Man	November 29, 1915	Theodore Marston	lost
A Price for Folly	December 15, 1915	George D. Baker	lost
Who Killed Joe Merrion?	December 19, 1915	Tefft Johnson	lost
On Her Wedding Night	December 20, 1915	George D. Baker	lost
The Crown Prince's Double	December 26, 1915	Van Dyke Brooke	lost
The Making Over of Geoffrey Manning	December 27, 1915	Harry Davenport	lost
Green Stockings	January 2, 1916	Wilfrid North	lost
Thou Art the Man	January 3, 1916	S. Rankin Drew	lost
My Lady's Slipper	January 10, 1916	Ralph Ince	lost
The Island of Surprise	January 16, 1916	Paul Scardon	lost
Britton of the Seventh	January 24, 1916	Lionel Belmore	lost
The Surprises of an Empty Hotel	February 7, 1916	Theodore Marston	lost
The Writing on the Wall	February 14, 1916	Tefft Johnson	lost
Kennedy Square	February 21, 1916	S. Rankin Drew	lost
For a Woman's Fair Name	February 28, 1916	Harry Davenport	extant
The Hunted Woman	March 6, 1916	S. Rankin Drew	lost
Mrs. Dane's Danger	March 6, 1916	Wilfrid North	lost
The Hero of Submarine D-2	March 13, 1916	Paul Scardon	lost
The Two Edged Sword	March 20, 1916	George D. Baker	lost
The Supreme Temptation	March 27, 1916	Harry Davenport	lost
The Vital Question	April 3, 1916	S. Rankin Drew	lost
Salvation Joan	April 9, 1916	Wilfrid North	lost
Artie, the Millionaire Kid	April 17, 1916	Harry Handworth	lost
God's Country and the Woman	April 24, 1916	Rollin S. Sturgeon	lost
The Law Decides	May 1, 1916	William P.S. Earle	lost
The Ordeal of Elizabeth	May 15, 1916	Wilfrid North	lost
The Suspect	May 22, 1916	S. Rankin Drew	lost
Lights of New York	May 29, 1916	Van Dyke Brooke	lost
The Destroyers	June 5, 1916	Ralph Ince	lost
The Redemption of Dave Darcey	June 12, 1916	Paul Scardon	lost
The Shop Girl	June 19, 1916	George D. Baker	lost
The Man Behind the Curtain	June 19, 1916	Cortland Van Deusen	lost
The Conflict	July 3, 1916	Ralph Ince	lost
Fathers of Men	July 10, 1916	William J. Humphrey	lost
The Tarantula	July 17, 1916	George D. Baker	lost
The Daring of Diana	July 24, 1916	S. Rankin Drew	lost
Hesper of the Mountains	July 31, 1916	Wilfrid North	lost
The Alibi	August 7, 1916	Paul Scardon	lost
The Dawn of Freedom	August 14, 1916	Theodore Marston, Paul Scardon	lost
The Footlights of Fate	August 21, 1916	William J. Humphrey	lost
The Kid	August 28, 1916	Wilfrid North	lost
His Wife's Good Name	September 4, 1916	Ralph Ince	lost
Phantom Fortunes	September 11, 1916	Paul Scardon	lost
The Combat	September 18, 1916	Ralph Ince	lost
The Chattel	September 24, 1916	Frederick A. Thomson	lost
Through the Wall	October 2, 1916	Rollin S. Sturgeon	lost
The Firm of Girdlestone	October 9, 1916	Harold M. Shaw	Made in Britain
A Prince in a Pawnshop	October 16, 1916	Paul Scardon	lost
The Blue Envelope Mystery	October 23, 1916	Wilfrid North	lost
The Last Man	October 30, 1916	William Wolbert	lost
The Devil's Prize	November 6, 1916	Marguerite Bertsch	lost
The Price of Fame	November 13, 1916	Charles Brabin	lost
The Dollar and the Law	November 20, 1916	Wilfrid North	lost
An Enemy to the King	November 26, 1916	Frederick A. Thomson	lost
Rose of the South	December 4, 1916	Paul Scardon	lost
The Enemy	December 11, 1916	Paul Scardon	lost
Whom the Gods Destroy	December 18, 1916	J. Stuart Blackton, Herbert Brenon	lost
The Ninety and Nine	December 25, 1916	Ralph Ince	lost
The Girl Philippa	December 31, 1916	S. Rankin Drew	lost
The Man of Mystery	January 8, 1917	Frederick A. Thomson	lost
Indiscretion	January 15, 1917	Wilfrid North	lost
The Glory of Yolanda	January 20, 1917	Marguerite Bertsch	lost
Her Right to Live	January 22, 1917	Paul Scardon	lost
The Courage of Silence	January 28, 1917	William P.S. Earle	lost
Money Magic	February 5, 1917	William Wolbert	lost
Kitty MacKay	February 19, 1917	Wilfrid North	lost
Intrigue	February 26, 1917	John S. Robertson	lost
The Money Mill	March 5, 1917	John S. Robertson	lost
Arsene Lupin	March 12, 1917	Paul Scardon	lost
Aladdin from Broadway	March 19, 1917	William Wolbert	lost
The More Excellent Way	March 26, 1917	Perry N. Vekroff	lost
Womanhood, the Glory of the Nation	April 1, 1917	J. Stuart Blackton, William P.S. Earle	lost
Babette	April 2, 1917	Charles Brabin	lost
Apartment 29	April 9, 1917	Paul Scardon	lost
Sally in a Hurry	April 16, 1917	Wilfrid North	lost
The Hawk	April 23, 1917	Paul Scardon	lost
Within the Law	April 29, 1917	William P.S. Earle	lost
Her Secret	April 30, 1917	Perry N. Vekroff	lost
Captain of the Gray Horse Troop	May 7, 1917	William Wolbert	lost
The Sixteenth Wife	May 14, 1917	Charles Brabin	extant
Clover's Rebellion	May 21, 1917	Wilfrid North	lost
The Soul Master	May 28, 1917	Marguerite Bertsch	lost
The Magnificent Meddler	June 4, 1917	William Wolbert	lost
The Question	June 11, 1917	Perry N. Vekroff	lost
The Maelstrom	June 18, 1917	Paul Scardon	extant
A Son of the Hills	June 25, 1917	Harry Davenport	lost
The Message of the Mouse	July 2, 1917	J. Stuart Blackton	lost
The Stolen Treaty	July 16, 1917	Paul Scardon	lost
Richard the Brazen	July 23, 1917	Perry N. Vekroff	lost
By Right of Possession	July 30, 1917	William Wolbert	lost
Mary Jane's Pa	August 13, 1917	Charles Brabin, William P.S. Earle	lost
Transgression	August 20, 1917	Paul Scardon	lost
Soldiers of Chance	September 3, 1917	Paul Scardon	lost
An Alabaster Box	September 10, 1917	Chester Withey	lost
For France	September 17, 1917	Wesley Ruggles	lost
Sunlight's Last Raid	September 24, 1917	William Wolbert	lost
The Princess of Park Row	October 1, 1917	Ashley Miller	lost
The Love Doctor	October 8, 1917	Paul Scardon	lost
Dead Shot Baker	October 15, 1917	William Duncan	lost
The Bottom of the Well	October 22, 1917	John S. Robertson	lost
The Flaming Omen	October 29, 1917	William Wolbert	lost
The Fettered Woman	November 5, 1917	Tom Terriss	lost
The Renaissance at Charleroi	November 10, 1917	Thomas R. Mills	lost
I Will Repay	November 12, 1917	William P.S. Earle	lost
The Grell Mystery	November 19, 1917	Paul Scardon	lost
The Skylight Room	November 24, 1917	Martin Justice	lost
Who Goes There?	November 26, 1917	William P.S. Earle	lost
The Tenderfoot	December 3, 1917	William Duncan	lost
The Marriage Speculation	December 10, 1917	Ashley Miller	lost
In the Balance	December 17, 1917	Paul Scardon	lost
When Men Are Tempted	December 24, 1917	William Wolbert	lost
His Own People	December 31, 1917	William P.S. Earle	lost
The Blind Adventure	January 7, 1918	Wesley Ruggles	lost
The Wild Strain	January 14, 1918	William Wolbert	lost
The Menace	January 21, 1918	John S. Robertson	lost
A Mother's Sin	January 28, 1918	Thomas R. Mills	lost
The Other Man	February 4, 1918	Paul Scardon	lost
The Woman Between Friends	February 11, 1918	Tom Terriss	lost
The Wooing of Princess Pat	February 18, 1918	William P.S. Earle	lost
Cavanaugh of the Forest Rangers	February 25, 1918	William Wolbert	lost
The Song of the Soul	March 4, 1918	Tom Terriss	lost
The Desired Woman	March 11, 1918	Paul Scardon	lost
An American Live Wire	March 18, 1918	Thomas R. Mills	lost
The Home Trail	March 25, 1918	William Wolbert	lost
Over the Top	March 31, 1918	Wilfrid North	lost
A Bachelor's Children	April 2, 1918	Paul Scardon	lost
Little Miss No-Account	April 13, 1918	William P.S. Earle	lost
The Girl from Beyond	April 15, 1918	William Wolbert	lost
The Business of Life	April 18, 1918	Tom Terriss	lost
The Seal of Silence	April 29, 1918	Thomas R. Mills	lost
The Little Runaway	May 6, 1918	William P.S. Earle	lost
The Triumph of the Weak	May 13, 1918	Tom Terriss	lost
The Golden Goal	May 29, 1918	Paul Scardon	lost
A Game with Fate	June 3, 1918	Paul Scardon	lost
Find the Woman	June 10, 1918	Tom Terriss	lost
The Soap Girl	June 17, 1918	Martin Justice	lost
The Girl in His House	June 24, 1918	Thomas R. Mills	lost
Tangled Lives	July 1, 1918	Paul Scardon	lost
One Thousand Dollars	July 8, 1918	Kenneth S. Webb	lost
To the Highest Bidder	July 13, 1918	Tom Terriss	lost
Love Watches	July 15, 1918	Henry Houry	lost
A Gentleman's Agreement	July 28, 1918	David Smith	lost
All Man	August 5, 1918	Paul Scardon	lost
Wild Primrose	August 12, 1918	Frederick A. Thomson	lost
The Changing Woman	August 19, 1918	David Smith	lost
The Clutch of Circumstance	August 26, 1918	Henry Houry	lost
The Green God	September 2, 1918	Paul Scardon	lost
A Nymph of the Foothills	September 9, 1918	Frederick A. Thomson	lost
By the World Forgot	September 16, 1918	David Smith	lost
Everybody's Girl	September 21, 1918	Tom Terriss	lost
The Girl of Today	September 23, 1918	John S. Robertson	lost
A Diplomatic Mission	September 30, 1918	Jack Conway	lost
The Mating	October 7, 1918	Frederick A. Thomson	lost
The King of Diamonds	October 14, 1918	Paul Scardon	lost
The Dawn of Understanding	November 23, 1918	David Smith	lost
Miss Ambition	November 25, 1918	Henry Houry	lost
The Man Who Wouldn't Tell	December 9, 1918	James Young	lost
The Beloved Impostor	December 16, 1918	Joseph Gleason	lost
Hoarded Assets	December 23, 1918	Paul Scardon	lost
The Common Cause	January 5, 1919	J. Stuart Blackton	lost
The Adventure Shop	January 6, 1919	Kenneth S. Webb	lost
The Captain's Captain	January 6, 1919	Tom Terriss	lost
The Enchanted Barn	January 27, 1919	David Smith	lost
The Highest Trump	February 3, 1919	James Young	lost
Fortune's Child	February 10, 1919	Joseph Gleason	lost
The Lion and the Mouse	February 16, 1919	Tom Terriss	lost
Silent Strength	February 17, 1919	Paul Scardon	lost
The Girl Problem	March 3, 1919	Kenneth S. Webb	lost
The Wishing Ring Man	March 10, 1919	David Smith	lost
A Gentleman of Quality	March 17, 1919	James Young	lost
Miss Dulcie from Dixie	March 24, 1919	Joseph Gleason	lost
Fighting Destiny	March 31, 1919	Paul Scardon	lost
The Cambric Mask	April 7, 1919	Tom Terriss	lost
The Unknown Quantity	April 14, 1919	Thomas R. Mills	lost
A Yankee Princess	April 21, 1919	David Smith	lost
The Usurper	April 28, 1919	James Young	lost
Two Women	April 28, 1919	Ralph Ince	lost
A Stitch in Time	May 5, 1919	Ralph Ince	lost
Beating the Odds	May 12, 1919	Paul Scardon	lost
The Third Degree	May 19, 1919	Tom Terriss	lost
Thin Ice	May 26, 1919	Thomas R. Mills	extant
The Little Boss	June 2, 1919	David Smith	lost
A Rogue's Romance	June 9, 1919	James Young	lost
Too Many Crooks	June 16, 1919	Ralph Ince	lost
The Painted World	June 16, 1919	Ralph Ince	lost
Beauty-Proof	June 23, 1919	Paul Scardon	extant
A Girl at Bay	June 28, 1919	Thomas R. Mills	lost
The Spark Divine	June 30, 1919	Tom Terriss	lost
Cupid Forecloses	July 12, 1919	David Smith	extant
Hornet's Nest	July 12, 1919	James Young	lost
The Man Who Won	July 14, 1919	Paul Scardon	lost
Shadows of the Past	July 26, 1919	Ralph Ince	lost
The Bramble Bush	August 15, 1919	Tom Terriss	lost
The Wolf	August 15, 1919	James Young	lost
The Girl-Woman	August 25, 1919	Thomas R. Mills	lost
Daring Hearts	August 28, 1919	Henry Houry	lost
In Honor's Web	September 6, 1919	Paul Scardon	lost
The Gamblers	September 11, 1919	Paul Scardon	lost
Over the Garden Wall	September 21, 1919	David Smith	lost
The Black Gate	October 3, 1919	Theodore Marston	lost
The Gray Towers Mystery	October 25, 1919	John W. Noble	lost
The Climbers	November 8, 1919	Tom Terriss	extant
The Mind-the-Paint Girl	November 10, 1919	Wilfrid North	lost
The Vengeance of Durand	November 15, 1919	Tom Terriss	lost
The Winchester Woman	November 16, 1919	Wesley Ruggles	lost
A Fighting Colleen	November 22, 1919	David Smith	lost
The Golden Shower	November 30, 1919	John W. Noble	lost
The Darkest Hour	December 1, 1919	Paul Scardon	lost
When a Man Loves	December 5, 1919	Chester Bennett	

== 1920s ==
Title	Release date	Director	Notes
The Church With An Overshot Wheel	1920	Joseph Byron Totten, based on a story by O Henry	extant
Slaves of Pride	January 19, 1920	George Terwilliger	extant
Pegeen	January 1920	David Smith	lost
Human Collateral	January 1920	Lawrence C. Windom	lost
The Invisible Hand	January 1920	William Bowman	lost
The Birth of a Soul	January 1920	Edwin L. Hollywood	lost
Deadline at Eleven	February 11, 1920	George Fawcett	lost
The Sporting Duchess	February 29, 1920	George Terwilliger	lost
The Fortune Hunter	February 1920	Tom Terriss	lost
The Flaming Clue	March 22, 1920	Edwin L. Hollywood	lost
Captain Swift	April 1920	Tom Terriss, Chester Bennett	lost
The Courage of Marge O'Doone	May 30, 1920	David Smith	lost
Dollars and the Woman	May 31, 1920	George Terwilliger	lost
The Garter Girl	May 1920	Edward H. Griffith	lost
A Master Stroke	June 1920	Chester Bennett	lost
The Midnight Bride	June 1920	William J. Humphrey	lost
The Sea Rider	June 1920	Edwin L. Hollywood	lost
Babs	July 5, 1920	Edward H. Griffith	lost
The Gauntlet	July 23, 1920	Edwin L. Hollywood	lost
The Whisper Market	September 13, 1920	George L. Sargent	lost
Hidden Dangers	September 1920	William Bertram	lost
Trumpet Island	September 1920	Tom Terriss	extant
The Prey	September 1920	George L. Sargent	lost
The Purple Cipher	October 11, 1920	Chester Bennett	lost
The Broadway Bubble	October 1920	George L. Sargent	lost
Dead Men Tell No Tales	November 1920	Tom Terriss	lost
The Vice of Fools	November 1920	Edward H. Griffith	lost
The Tower of Jewels	December 1920	Tom Terriss	lost
The Romance Promoters	December 1920	Chester Bennett	lost
Three Sevens	January 10, 1921	Chester Bennett	incomplete
Black Beauty	January 1921	David Smith	incomplete, reels 3,4 & 7 from Killiam
Cousin Kate	January 1921	Lucille McVey	lost
Diamonds Adrift	January 1921	Chester Bennett	fragment
It Isn't Being Done This Season	January 1921	George L. Sargent	lost
Princess Jones	January 1921	Gustav von Seyffertitz	lost
The Charming Deceiver	March 1921	George L. Sargent	lost
Her Lord and Master	March 1921	Edward José	lost
What's Your Reputation Worth?	March 1921	Webster Campbell	lost
It Can Be Done	March 1921	David Smith	lost
The Heart of Maryland	May 1921	Tom Terriss	lost
The Scarab Ring	June 1921	Edward José	lost
The Silver Car	June 1921	David Smith	lost
Closed Doors	July 1921	Gustav von Seyffertitz	lost
Peggy Puts It Over	August 1921	Gustav von Seyffertitz	lost
Where Men Are Men	September 1, 1921	William Duncan	lost
The Inner Chamber	September 11, 1921	Edward José	lost
Moral Fibre	September 18, 1921	Webster Campbell	lost
Breaking Through	September 25, 1921	Robert Ensminger	lost
The Secret of the Hills	September 25, 1921	Chester Bennett	lost
The Matrimonial Web	October 2, 1921	Edward José	lost
Bring Him In	October 16, 1921	Robert Ensminger	extant
The Son of Wallingford	October 30, 1921	George Randolph Chester, Lillian Josephine Chester	lost
Steelheart	November 6, 1921	William Duncan	lost
The Single Track	November 13, 1921	Webster Campbell	lost
Rainbow	November 20, 1921	Edward José	lost
A Guilty Conscience	November 27, 1921	David Smith	lost
The Flower of the North	December 4, 1921	David Smith	extant
Lucky Carson	December 18, 1921	Wilfrid North	lost
No Defense	December 25, 1921	William Duncan	lost
Received Payment	January 8, 1922	Charles Maigne	lost
The Little Minister	January 22, 1922	David Smith	lost
The Prodigal Judge	February 19, 1922	Edward José	lost
Island Wives	March 12, 1922	Webster Campbell	lost
The Man from Downing Street	April 2, 1922	Edward José	lost
Too Much Business	April 9, 1922	Jess Robbins	lost
The Silent Vow	April 16, 1922	William Duncan	lost
The Angel of Crooked Street	April 23, 1922	David Smith	lost
A Virgin's Sacrifice	May 21, 1922	Webster Campbell	extant
Restless Souls	May 28, 1922	Robert Ensminger	lost
The Girl in His Room	June 4, 1922	Edward José	lost
Divorce Coupons	July 2, 1922	Webster Campbell	lost
The Purple Riders	July 3, 1922	William Bertram	lost
The Ladder Jinx	August 20, 1922	Jess Robbins	lost
My Wild Irish Rose	August 30, 1922	David Smith	lost
The Light in the Dark	September 3, 1922	Clarence Brown	incomplete
A Girl's Desire	September 19, 1922	David Smith	lost
When Danger Smiles	October 3, 1922	William Duncan	incomplete
The Fighting Guide	October 15, 1922	William Duncan	lost
Fortune's Mask	October 22, 1922	Robert Ensminger	lost
Little Wildcat	November 12, 1922	David Smith	lost
You Never Know	December 10, 1922	Robert Ensminger	lost
The Ninety and Nine	December 17, 1922	David Smith	extant
A Front Page Story	December 25, 1922	Jess Robbins	lost
One Stolen Night	January 29, 1923	Robert Ensminger	incomplete
Playing It Wild	April 19, 1923	William Duncan	lost
Masters of Men	May 14, 1923	David Smith	extant
The Man Next Door	May 28, 1923	Victor Schertzinger	incomplete
Loyal Lives	July 26, 1923	Charles Giblyn	incomplete
The Midnight Alarm	August 19, 1923	David Smith	extant
On the Banks of the Wabash	October 22, 1923	J. Stuart Blackton	incomplete
The Leavenworth Case	November 4, 1923	Charles Giblyn	lost
Pioneer Trails	November 11, 1923	David Smith	extant
The Man from Brodney's	December 16, 1923	David Smith	incomplete
The Love Bandit	January 6, 1924	Dell Henderson	incomplete
Let Not Man Put Asunder	January 10, 1924	J. Stuart Blackton	lost
My Man	February 10, 1924	David Smith	lost
Virtuous Liars	March 30, 1924	Whitman Bennett	extant
Borrowed Husbands	April 13, 1924	David Smith	lost
Between Friends	May 11, 1924	J. Stuart Blackton	lost
One Law for the Woman	May 25, 1924	Dell Henderson	incomplete
Code of the Wilderness	June 30, 1924	David Smith	extant
Behold This Woman	August 3, 1924	J. Stuart Blackton	incomplete
Captain Blood	September 8, 1924	David Smith	extant
The Clean Heart	September 15, 1924	J. Stuart Blackton	incomplete
The Beloved Brute	November 9, 1924	J. Stuart Blackton	incomplete
Greater Than Marriage	November 16, 1924	Victor Halperin	incomplete
Two Shall Be Born	December 7, 1924	Whitman Bennett	lost
Fear-Bound	January 18, 1925	William Nigh	lost
The Redeeming Sin	January 25, 1925	J. Stuart Blackton	lost
Pampered Youth	February 1, 1925	David Smith	incomplete
The Empty Saddle	March 28, 1925	Harry S. Webb	extant
School for Wives	April 5, 1925	Victor Halperin	lost
Baree, Son of Kazan	April 19, 1925	David Smith	lost
Tides of Passion	April 19, 1925	J. Stuart Blackton	incomplete
Wildfire	June 7, 1925	T. Hayes Hunter	extant
Steele of the Royal Mounted	June 15, 1925	David Smith	incomplete
The Happy Warrior	July 5, 1925	J. Stuart Blackton	incomplete
West of Arizona	July 11, 1925	Tom Gibson	lost
Ranger of the Big Pines	July 26, 1925	W.S. Van Dyke	incomplete
The Love Hour	August 30, 1925	Herman C. Raymaker	lost
The Unknown Lover	October 30, 1925	Victor Halperin	lost
Her Second Chance	March 28, 1926	Lambert Hillyer	lost, Released following Warner Bros. takeover

== Bibliography ==
- Dewey, Donald. Buccaneer: James Stuart Blackton and the Birth of American Movies. Rowman & Littlefield, 2016.
- Munden, Kenneth White. The American Film Institute Catalog of Motion Pictures Produced in the United States, Part 1. University of California Press, 1997.
- Slide, Anthony. The New Historical Dictionary of the American Film Industry. Routledge, 2014.
- Encyclopedia of Early Cinema, ed. Richard Abel (London: Routledge, 2005), 679; and Adam Lauder, “It’s Alive!: Bertram Brooker and Vitalism,” in The Logic of Nature, the Romance of Space: Elements of Canadian Modernist Painting, ed. Cassandra Getty (Windsor, ON; Oshawa, ON: Art Gallery of Windsor; The Robert McLaughlin Gallery, 2010), 104n93.
