= Single track =

Single track may refer to:

- Road, track or railway only wide enough for one vehicle at a time. See:
  - Single-track railway
  - Single-track road
  - Singletrack (mountain biking)
  - Trail
- Single-track vehicles, such as:
  - Bicycles
  - Motorcycles
  - Monoskies
- Single (music) - a single piece of music released by an artist
- The Single Track, a 1921 American film directed by Webster Campbell
