= The Pace That Thrills =

The Pace That Thrills may refer to:

- The Pace That Thrills (1925 film), American silent film
- The Pace That Thrills (1952 film), American film
