= The Triumph of the Weak =

- Directed by: Tom Terriss
- Written by: Garfield Thompson
- Based on: My Man by Edith Ellis and Forrest Halsey
- Starring: Alice Joyce; Walter McGrail; Eulalie Jensen
- Cinematography: Joseph Shelderfer
- Distributed by: Vitagraph Company of America
- Release date: May 13, 1918
- Running time: 5 reels (approx. 50 minutes)
- Country: United States
- Language: Silent (English intertitles)

The Triumph of the Weak is a 1918 Vitagraph American drama film that was directed by Tom Terriss, written by Garfield Thompson based upon a play by Edith Ellis and Forrest Halsey, and starring Alice Joyce. It is the story of a woman who steals to provide food for her child and the consequence which follow her act, the narrow escapes she has of the many pitfalls, in her efforts to live in the straight and narrow path. This film appears to be lost.

== Plot ==
Frank Merrill, a Great Lakes pilot, loses his life in a storm and his wife, Edith, to support her child leaves for the city where she steals and is imprisoned. Three years later, upon her release, she takes her child from the state orphanage and goes to another city where she secures employment in a department store. She marries the superintendent, Jim Roberts. Mabel, who served time with Edith, is freed and arranges with Mickey Bill to enlist the aid of Edith in a robbery under threat of exposure. The burglary is committed, and, when Mabel is trapped, Edith, fearing a revelation of her past, says that she is responsible. In a trap laid by Detective Jordan to get Mabel the truth comes out and Edith's past is laid bare to her husband. He forgives her and the thieves are rounded up.

== Cast ==
- Alice Joyce as Edith Merrill
- Walter McGrail as Jim Roberts
- Templar Saxe as Robert Jordan
- Eulalie Jensen as Diamond Mabel
- Adele DeGarde as Lizee
- William Carr as Teddy (credited as Billy Carr)
- Bernard Siegel as Brown
