= Drawing the Line (film) =

1915 film

- Directed by: B. Reeves Eason
- Written by: Joseph F. Poland
- Starring: Lillian Buckingham
- Distributed by: Mutual Film
- Release date: August 23, 1915
- Country: United States
- Language: Silent (English intertitles)

Drawing the Line is a 1915 American short film directed by B. Reeves Eason and starring Vivian Rich.

== Cast ==
- Lillian Buckingham
- Webster Campbell
- Louise Lester
- Vivian Rich
- Walter Spencer
