= Mortmain (film) =

1915 American mystery drama film

Mortmain is a five-part 1915 Vitagraph mystery drama film, directed by Theodore Marston. Reviewer Lynde Denig said it was a mystery drama with a scientific background that "comes pretty close to being a model of motion picture craftsmanship." The film was adapted from a story by Arthur Train. The New York Clipper called it remindful of the stories of Edgar Allan Poe. It stars Robert Edeson. Marguerite Bertsch wrote the screenplay. The story involves the grafting of one man's hand to replace a man's who had his crushed. The consequences are haunting. The film is presumed lost.

It was advertised as a "Medical Mystery". An image used in advertising material features a creepy black and white hand with the word "MORT" but on it. Censors blocked the film from being shown in Philadelphia and Chicago.

== Cast ==
- Robert Edeson as Mortmain
- Donald Hall as Gordon Russell
- Edward Elkas as Flaggs
- Joseph Weber as Flynt
- Muriel Ostriche as Bella Forsythe
- Karin Norman as Miss Fickles
- James Morrison as Tom Forsythe
- J. Herbert Frank as Doctor Pennison Crisp
- Gladden James as Scalscope
- Roland Osborne as Mortmain’s butler
- Helen Pillsbury as a society lady

== See also ==
- Mortmain
- List of Vitagraph Studios films
