= The Social Lion =

1930 film

- Theatrical release poster
- Directed by: A. Edward Sutherland
- Screenplay by: Octavus Roy Cohen; Joseph L. Mankiewicz; Agnes Brand Leahy
- Starring: Jack Oakie; Mary Brian; Richard "Skeets" Gallagher; Olive Borden; Charles Sellon; Cyril Ring; E. H. Calvert
- Cinematography: Allen G. Siegler
- Edited by: Otho Lovering
- Music by: Howard Jackson
- Production company: Paramount Pictures
- Distributed by: Paramount Pictures
- Release date: June 21, 1930
- Running time: 72 minutes
- Country: United States
- Language: English

The Social Lion is a 1930 American Pre-Code comedy film directed by A. Edward Sutherland and written by Octavus Roy Cohen, Joseph L. Mankiewicz and Agnes Brand Leahy, and starring Jack Oakie, Mary Brian, Richard "Skeets" Gallagher, Olive Borden, Charles Sellon, Cyril Ring and E. H. Calvert. It was released on June 21, 1930, by Paramount Pictures.

== Plot ==
Marco Perkins is a garage mechanic and a would-be-prizefighter who gets a place on the ritzy country club's polo team because he is the town's most proficient mallet-wielder, having learned to play polo while serving in the U.S. army. His hobnobbing with the town-elite and social upper-crust at the polo-matches gives him an inflated idea of his social position, and he decides he is moving on up. He breaks off with his girl-friend, true-blue Cynthia Brown, and hits on débutante Gloria Staunton, who appears to have an interest in being hit upon. Gloria's interest lies mostly in showing Marco that hired-hands who can play polo still aren't to the manor born.

== Cast ==
- Jack Oakie as Marco Perkins
- Mary Brian as Cynthia Brown
- Richard "Skeets" Gallagher as Chick Hathaway
- Olive Borden as Gloria Staunton
- Charles Sellon as Jim Perkins
- Cyril Ring as Ralph Williams
- E. H. Calvert as Henderson
- James Gibson as Howard
- Henry Roquemore as Smith
- William Bechtel as Schultz
- Richard Henry Cummings as McGinnis
