= Cyril Ring =

American actor (1892–1967)

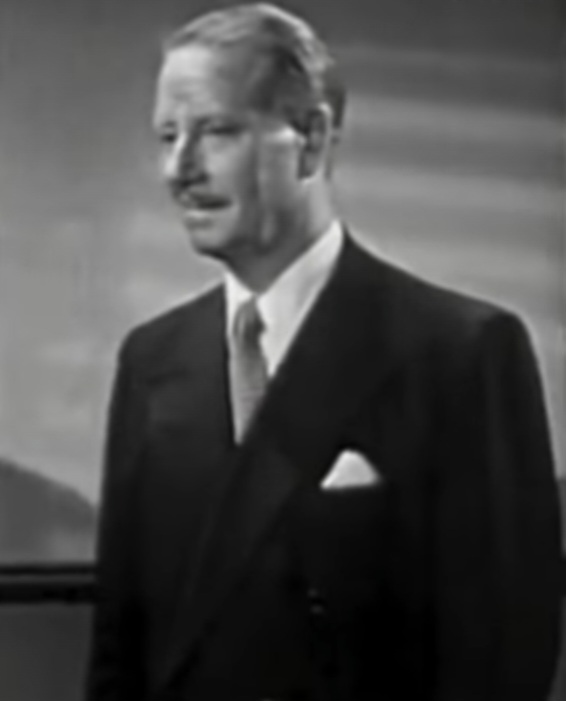
- Ring in Hollywood and Vine (1945)
- Born: December 5, 1892; Boston, Massachusetts, U.S.
- Died: July 17, 1967 (aged 74); Hollywood, California, U.S.
- Occupation: Actor
- Years active: 1915–1951
- Spouse: Charlotte Greenwood (m. 1915; div. 1922)
- Relatives: Blanche Ring (sister); A. Edward Sutherland (nephew)

Cyril Ring (December 5, 1892 – July 17, 1967) was an American actor. By the time of his final performance in 1951, he had appeared in more than 350 films, nearly all of them in small and/or uncredited bit parts.

Ring is probably best known today for his featured role as Harvey Yates, a swindler and accomplice to fellow swindler Penelope, played by Kay Francis in the Marx Brothers' first film The Cocoanuts (1929). He also appeared in uncredited small parts in two other Marx films, Monkey Business (1931) and A Day at the Races (1937).

== Early life ==
Born in Boston, Massachusetts, Ring began his stage career as a young man, following his older sister Blanche Ring into show business. In 1915 he married comedienne and dancer Charlotte Greenwood. During their marriage Ring acted as her personal manager; they divorced in 1922. Although a studio biography states that Ring entered motion pictures in 1917, his wedding announcement of 1915 identifies him as already working in this field. He also appeared in many hit plays including The Yankee Girl, So Long Letty, Linger Longer, and Madam Sherry. Ring's nephew was prominent film director Eddie Sutherland.

== Career ==
By 1929 Ring had been with Paramount Pictures for several years as a member of its stock company, and with the new talking pictures requiring stage-trained actors who could deliver dialogue persuasively, Ring was a qualified candidate for the villainous role in The Cocoanuts. It turned out to be Ring's best-remembered screen role. In the New York Times review on May 25, 1929, Mordaunt Hall singled Ring out for criticism: "Cyril Ring, in an amateurish fashion, does the honors as the conspiring Mr. Yates, whose great hope in this adventure is to cash in on Mrs. Potter's gems. Mr. Ring, who has impersonated regiments of villains on the silent screen, here plays his part as though everybody but his determined female partner were both sightless and deaf."

Marx Brothers historian Matthew Coniam observes, "It seems to me he makes a perfectly good job of villainous Harvey Yates in The Cocoanuts. But for some reason he got the most terrible reviews, and his career didn't so much decline as nosedive almost immediately afterwards."

== Successful bit player ==
The Cocoanuts didn't lead to further major roles, but Ring's well-tailored and businesslike appearance guaranteed him steady work in motion pictures. He began freelancing at most of the Hollywood studios, playing any number of incidental characters. His nephew Eddie Sutherland cast him in Sutherland's pictures (like International House with W. C. Fields).

Ring is usually seen as a desk clerk or reporter, but can also be spotted in restaurant or theater scenes (either as a staff member or a patron), or just as a recognizable face in the crowd (as in Laurel and Hardy's Block-Heads, where a crowded elevator opens to reveal Ring standing quietly and pleasantly in the front row). Many directors often sent out casting calls for big crowd scenes, and Ring could be depended upon to report for duty. In the 1937 film Nothing Sacred, for example, director William A. Wellman needed 18 bit players and 193 extras for a banquet scene; and Ring answered the call. One of his few leads was in a Gertrude Niesen musical short filmed for coin-operated jukeboxes in 1940, co-produced by singer Rudy Vallee and businessman William Kemble; Niesen sings the current hit "Jim" longingly while Ring (as Jim) gleefully enjoys the company of every girl but Niesen.

Ring was extraordinarily prolific, with 33 documented appearances in 1937 alone, and 36 more in 1939. He worked steadily through 1945. After World War II most studios decided to make fewer lower-budget pictures, leaving Ring with fewer assignments, but he continued to work in pictures until 1951.

== Death ==
Ring died on July 17, 1967, in Hollywood, California, at age 74.

== Selected filmography ==
- The Conquest of Canaan (1921) as Gene Louden
- Divorce Coupons (1922) as Conrad Fontaine
- Back Home and Broke (1922) as Eustace Grimley
- The Ne'er-Do-Well (1923)
- The Exciters (1923) as Roger Patton
- Homeward Bound (1923) as Rufus Brent Jr.
- Pied Piper Malone (1924) as Charles Crosby Jr.
- The Breaking Point (1924) as Louis Bassett
- The Guilty One (1924) as H. Beverly Graves
- Hit and Run (1924) as George Collins
- In Hollywood with Potash and Perlmutter (1924) as Partington
- Tongues of Flame (1924) as Clayton
- Mismates (1926) as Helwig
- News Parade (1928) as Prince Oscar
- The Cocoanuts (1929) as Yates
- The Social Lion (1930) as Ralph Williams
- Top Speed (1930) as Vincent Colgate (uncredited)
- Millie (1931) as Bailey (uncredited)
- Don't Bet on Women (1931) as Jeanne's Dancing Partner (uncredited)
- Bad Sister (1931) as Doctor (uncredited)
- Monkey Business (1931) as Party Guest (uncredited)
- Union Depot (1932) as Track 4 Ticket Taker (uncredited)
- Sky Devils (1932) as Military Policeman (uncredited)
- Business and Pleasure (1932) as Arthur Jones
- Disorderly Conduct (1932) as Nightclub Patron (uncredited)
- It's Tough to Be Famous (1932) as Reporter from the Star (uncredited)
- The Dark Horse (1932) as Airport Clerk (uncredited)
- The Purchase Price (1932) as Second Man Joan Sings To (uncredited)
- Madison Square Garden (1932) as Sports Reporter (uncredited)
- Secrets of the French Police (1932) as Minor Role (uncredited)
- The Half-Naked Truth (1932) as Phelps (uncredited)
- Two Lips and Juleps (1932)
- Murders in the Zoo (1933) as Banquet Guest (uncredited)
- Emergency Call (1933) as Dr. Lenehan (uncredited)
- International House (1933) as Mr. Brown as Assistant Hotel Manager (uncredited)
- A Shriek in the Night (1933) as Eddie, Morgue Attendant (uncredited)
- Neighbors' Wives (1933) as Bill Cooper
- Too Much Harmony (1933) as Stage Manager (uncredited)
- Tillie and Gus (1933) as Poker Player (uncredited)
- Meet the Baron (1933) as Mayor's 'Yes' Man (uncredited)
- Dark Hazard (1934) as Man at Third Roulette Table (uncredited)
- No More Bridge! (1934, Short)
- Sisters Under the Skin (1934) as Bored Man
- The Most Precious Thing in Life (1934) as Motel Clerk (uncredited)
- Hollywood Hoodlum (1934) as Duke as Tony's Assistant
- Call It Luck (1934) as Man at Window (uncredited)
- Behold My Wife! (1934) as Society Man at Party (uncredited)
- The Gilded Lily (1935) as Headwaiter (uncredited)
- Goin' to Town (1935) as Stage Manager (uncredited)
- Black Sheep (1935) as Passenger (uncredited)
- Hooray for Love (1935) as Second Radio Official Firing Doug (uncredited)
- Love Me Forever (1935) as Auction Spectator (uncredited)
- The Murder Man (1935) as Man at Defense Table (uncredited)
- Don't Bet on Blondes (1935) as Man with $30,000 Bettor (uncredited)
- Shanghai (1935) as Reporter from 'Free Press' (uncredited)
- Dante's Inferno (1935) as Drunk in Cabin (uncredited)
- Page Miss Glory (1935) as Reporter (uncredited)
- Diamond Jim (1935) as Fireman (uncredited)
- Navy Wife (1935) as Ship Passenger (uncredited)
- Two-Fisted (1935) as Companion to Briggs (uncredited)
- It's in the Air (1935) as Drake's Assistant (uncredited)
- Rendezvous (1935) as Orderly (uncredited)
- The Payoff (1935) as Reporter (uncredited)
- Music Is Magic (1935) as Cafe Patron (uncredited)
- Thanks a Million (1935) as Audience Member (uncredited)
- The Man Who Broke the Bank at Monte Carlo (1935) as Casino Bar Patron (uncredited)
- Man of Iron (1935) as Golfer (uncredited)
- The Bride Comes Home (1935) as Party Guest (uncredited)
- Dangerous (1935) as Rehearsal Observer (uncredited)
- Hitch Hike Lady (1935) as Information Clerk (uncredited)
- King of Burlesque (1936) as Auctioneer's Assistant (uncredited)
- Song and Dance Man (1936) as Hotel Clerk (uncredited)
- Everybody's Old Man (1936) as Salesman (uncredited)
- Colleen (1936) as Client with Ames Company Official (uncredited)
- The Great Ziegfeld (1936) as Reporter (uncredited)
- The First Baby (1936) as Wedding Guest (uncredited)
- Gentle Julia (1936) as Neighbor at Dance (uncredited)
- Palm Springs (1936) as Reception Clerk (uncredited)
- The Border Patrolman (1936) as Ed Hendricks (uncredited)
- A Son Comes Home (1936) as Reporter (uncredited)
- Charlie Chan at the Race Track (1936) as Race Track Patron (uncredited)
- The Man Who Lived Twice (1936) as Heifetz Concert Attendee (uncredited)
- Wedding Present (1936) as Reporter (uncredited)
- 15 Maiden Lane (1936) as Party Guest (uncredited)
- Pigskin Parade (1936) as Professor at Meeting (uncredited)
- Polo Joe (1936) as Spectator (uncredited)
- Go West, Young Man (1936) as Reporter (uncredited)
- Love on the Run (1936) as Wally as a Reporter (uncredited)
- More Than a Secretary (1936) as Department Head (uncredited)
- College Holiday (1936) as Customer (uncredited)
- After the Thin Man (1936) as Reporter (uncredited)
- God's Country and the Woman (1937) as Passerby (uncredited)
- Criminal Lawyer (1937) as Extra at Larkin's Nightclub (uncredited)
- Time Out for Romance (1937) as Reporter (uncredited)
- When You're in Love (1937) as Man Outside Dressing Room (uncredited)
- A Doctor's Diary (1937) as Dr. Merrick (uncredited)
- When's Your Birthday? (1937) as Charity Bazarr Extra (uncredited)
- A Family Affair (1937) as Convention Delegate on Platform (uncredited)
- Swing High, Swing Low (1937) as Visitor Leaving Ship (uncredited)
- Nobody's Baby (1937) as Nightclub Patron (uncredited)
- Make Way for Tomorrow (1937) as Guest in Vogard Hotel Lobby (uncredited)
- Melody for Two (1937) as Nightclub Table Extra (uncredited)
- There Goes My Girl (1937) as Wedding Guest (uncredited)
- It May Happen to You (1937, Short) as Intern (uncredited)
- A Day at the Races (1937) as Racetrack Spectator (uncredited)
- Married Before Breakfast (1937) as Nightclub Patron (uncredited)
- Slim (1937) as Extra Dancing in Nightclub (uncredited)
- Wake Up and Live (1937) as Radio Man in Control Booth (uncredited)
- Topper (1937) as Nightclub Patron (uncredited)
- That Certain Woman (1937) as Hotel Lobby Extra (uncredited)
- The Life of the Party (1937) as Night Club Extra (uncredited)
- One Hundred Men and a Girl (1937) as Concert Attendee (uncredited)
- It Happened in Hollywood (1937) as Rudy as Cameraman (uncredited)
- The Women Men Marry (1937) as Doorman (uncredited)
- Charlie Chan on Broadway (1937) as Candid Camera Fan at Hottentot Club (uncredited)
- There Goes the Groom (1937) as Class Reunion Greeter (uncredited)
- Fight for Your Lady (1937) as Wrestling Spectator (uncredited)
- 52nd Street (1937) as Nightclub Patron (uncredited)
- Navy Blue and Gold (1937) as Naval Officer at Football Game (uncredited)
- Blossoms on Broadway (1937) as Reporter (uncredited)
- Nothing Sacred (1937) as Pilot (uncredited)
- She Married an Artist (1937) as Reporter (uncredited)
- Wells Fargo (1937) as Minor Role (uncredited)
- The Last Gangster (1937)
- City Girl (1938) as Cigar Stand Proprietor (uncredited)
- Love Is a Headache (1938) as Reporter (uncredited)
- Little Miss Roughneck (1938) as Ward (uncredited)
- Dangerous to Know (1938) as Guest at Party (uncredited)
- The First Hundred Years (1938) as Night Club Patron (uncredited)
- King of the Newsboys (1938) as Businessman (uncredited)
- Goodbye Broadway (1938) as Minor Role (uncredited)
- Test Pilot (1938) as N.A.A. Official (uncredited)
- Joy of Living (1938) as Man in Margaret's Dressing Room (uncredited)
- Hold That Kiss (1938) as Dog Show Attendee (uncredited)
- Holiday (1938) as Churchgoer (uncredited)
- One Wild Night (1938) as Bank Employee (uncredited)
- Always Goodbye (1938) as Fashion Show Patron (uncredited)
- The Crowd Roars (1938) as Ringsider (uncredited)
- Block-Heads (1938) as Elevator Passenger (uncredited)
- I Am the Law (1938) as Photographer (uncredited)
- Three Loves Has Nancy (1938) as Man at Party (uncredited)
- Too Hot to Handle (1938) as Cameraman (uncredited)
- Hold That Co-ed (1938) as Radio Reporter on Football Field (uncredited)
- The Spider's Web (1938) as Henry Blake (uncredited)
- Young Dr. Kildare (1938) as Intern (uncredited)
- Sharpshooters (1938) as Newsman (uncredited)
- The Shining Hour (1938) as Candid Cameraman (uncredited)
- Up the River (1938) as Well-Wisher (uncredited)
- Gambling Ship (1938) as Croupier (uncredited)
- Sweethearts (1938) as Waiter (uncredited)
- Kentucky (1938) as Dancer (uncredited)
- Trade Winds (1938) as Party Guest (uncredited)
- Disbarred (1939) as Jury Foreman (uncredited)
- They Made Me a Criminal (1939) as First Fight Ringsider (uncredited)
- North of Shanghai (1939) as Minor Role (uncredited)
- Made for Each Other (1939) as Office Worker (uncredited)
- Let Freedom Ring (1939) as Rancher (uncredited)
- Society Smugglers (1939) as Party Guest (uncredited)
- Mystery Plane (1939) as Henchman (uncredited)
- King of Chinatown (1939) as Fight Spectator (uncredited)
- The Adventures of Jane Arden (1939) as Man Buying Newspaper (uncredited)
- First Offenders (1939) as Reporter (uncredited)
- Zenobia (1939) as Townsman (uncredited)
- Union Pacific (1939) as Surveyor (uncredited)
- The Rookie Cop (1939) as Second Glove Salesman (uncredited)
- Man of Conquest (1939) as Ball Attendee (uncredited)
- Lucky Night (1939) as Bus Passenger (uncredited)
- Rose of Washington Square (1939) as Master of Ceremonies at Cast Party (uncredited)
- Mandrake the Magician (1939, Serial) as Magic Mart Henchman (uncredited)
- Invitation to Happiness (1939) as Reporter at Fight (uncredited)
- It Could Happen to You (1939) as Reporter (uncredited)
- Good Girls Go to Paris (1939) as Wedding Guest (uncredited)
- Second Fiddle (1939) as Florist (uncredited)
- Mr. Moto Takes a Vacation (1939) as Museum Exhibit Attendee (uncredited)
- Winter Carnival (1939) as Reporter at Terminal (uncredited)
- Miracles for Sale (1939) as Numbers' Man (uncredited)
- Our Leading Citizen (1939) as Delegate (uncredited)
- Golden Boy (1939) as Extra in Moody's New Office (uncredited)
- Blackmail (1939) as Ramey's Butler (uncredited)
- Babes in Arms (1939) as Vaudevilian Celebrant (uncredited)
- Espionage Agent (1939) as Spectator at Dart Throwing (uncredited)
- Hollywood Cavalcade (1939) as First Row Extra in Theater Audience (uncredited)
- The Roaring Twenties (1939) as Charlie (uncredited)
- Day-Time Wife (1939) as Nightclub Patron (uncredited)
- Private Detective (1939) as Man Buying Newspaper (uncredited)
- Remember? (1939) as Party Guest (uncredited)
- Slightly Honorable (1939) as Nightclub Patron (uncredited)
- The Light That Failed (1939) as War Correspondent (uncredited)
- Mexican Spitfire (1940) as Man at Bachelor Party (uncredited)
- The Man Who Wouldn't Talk (1940) as Reporter (uncredited)
- I Take This Woman (1940) as Night Club Extra (uncredited)
- Broadway Melody of 1940 (1940) as Show Backer at Rehearsal / Nightclub Headwaiter (uncredited)
- The House Across the Bay (1940) as Dancer (uncredited)
- Road to Singapore (1940) as Ship's Officer (uncredited)
- Johnny Apollo (1940) as Cashier (uncredited)
- The Man with Nine Lives (1940) as Doctor Spectator (uncredited)
- Two Girls on Broadway (1940) as Bartell's Second Assistant (uncredited)
- Irene (1940) as Charity Ball Guest (uncredited)
- My Favorite Wife (1940) as Nick's Lawyer (uncredited)
- Beyond Tomorrow (1940) as Man Reporting No Hope for Crash Victims (uncredited)
- Edison, the Man (1940) as Reporter (uncredited)
- Those Were the Days! (1940) as Mr. Sanford (uncredited)
- Girl in 313 (1940) as Bartender (uncredited)
- Sailor's Lady (1940) as Lieutenant Commander—Arizona (uncredited)
- Sporting Blood (1940) as Man at Race Track (uncredited)
- My Love Came Back (1940) as Party Guest (uncredited)
- Girls of the Road (1940) as Pickup Man at Bus Depot (uncredited)
- The Boys from Syracuse (1940) as Guard
- Pier 13 (1940) as Engagement Party Guest (uncredited)
- The Golden Fleecing (1940) as Cameraman (uncredited)
- Rhythm on the River (1940) as Party Guest (uncredited)
- The Leather Pushers (1940) as Ringsider (uncredited)
- Hired Wife (1940) as Office Worker (uncredited)
- No Time for Comedy (1940) as Backstage Man (uncredited)
- The Bride Wore Crutches (1940) as Gas Station Attendant (uncredited)
- Sky Murder (1940) as Party Guest (uncredited)
- Dulcy (1940) as Silent Reporter (uncredited)
- Third Finger, Left Hand (1940) as Man at Railroad Station (uncredited)
- The Great Dictator (1940) as Officer Extra (uncredited)
- North West Mounted Police (1940) as Mountie (uncredited)
- Christmas in July (1940) as Coworker (uncredited)
- One Night in the Tropics (1940) as Club Roscoe Maitre d' (uncredited)
- Life with Henry (1940) as Theatre Patron (uncredited)
- Little Nellie Kelly (1940) as Man Bumped by Dennis (uncredited)
- Charter Pilot (1940) as Radio Operator 'Sparks' (uncredited)
- No, No, Nanette (1940) as Desk Clerk (uncredited)
- Michael Shayne, Private Detective (1940) as Reporter (uncredited)
- Honeymoon for Three (1941) as Hotel Restaurant Patron (uncredited)
- The Wild Man of Borneo (1941) as Passerby in Atlas Building (uncredited)
- Ride, Kelly, Ride (1941) as Photographer (uncredited)
- The Lady Eve (1941) as Husband on Ship (uncredited)
- A Girl, a Guy, and a Gob (1941) as Hustler (uncredited)
- The Lone Wolf Takes a Chance (1941) as Hotel Manager (uncredited)
- Meet John Doe (1941) as Radio Technician (uncredited)
- Las Vegas Nights (1941) as Club Nevada Patron (uncredited)
- The Man Who Lost Himself (1941) as Relative (uncredited)
- The Great Lie (1941) as Harry Anderson (uncredited)
- Citizen Kane (1941) as Newspaperman at Trenton Town Hall (uncredited)
- For Beauty's Sake (1941) as Hotel Desk Clerk (uncredited)
- Blondie in Society (1941) as Salesman (uncredited)
- San Antonio Rose (1941) as Man at Bar (uncredited)
- Accent on Love (1941) as Court Clerk (uncredited)
- Ringside Maisie (1941) as Reporter (uncredited)
- Kiss the Boys Goodbye (1941) as Reporter at Party (uncredited)
- Our Wife (1941) as Shipboard Passenger (uncredited)
- Here Comes Mr. Jordan (1941) as Board Member (uncredited)
- Ice-Capades (1941) as Photographer (uncredited)
- Lady Be Good (1941) as Party Guest (uncredited)
- Harmon of Michigan (1941) as Carter (uncredited)
- You'll Never Get Rich (1941) as Passerby on Street (uncredited)
- The Stork Pays Off (1941) as Father (uncredited)
- Great Guns (1941) as Canteen Clerk (uncredited)
- Three Girls About Town (1941) as Extra at Labor Meeting (uncredited)
- Public Enemies (1941) as Reporter
- Birth of the Blues (1941) as Cafe Patron (uncredited)
- I Wake Up Screaming (1941) as Reporter
- New York Town (1941) as Spectator (uncredited)
- Blues in the Night (1941) as Gambler at Dice Table (uncredited)
- Keep 'Em Flying (1941) as Nightclub Extra (uncredited)
- I Killed That Man (1941) as Reporter (uncredited)
- Marry the Boss's Daughter (1941) as vice-president (uncredited)
- Two-Faced Woman (1941) as Dancer (uncredited)
- Sullivan's Travels (1941) as Reporter (uncredited)
- Glamour Boy (1941) as Nightclub Patron (uncredited)
- Steel Against the Sky (1941) as Harry (scenes deleted)
- Louisiana Purchase (1941) as Senator (uncredited)
- Lady for a Night (1942) as King's Club Patron (uncredited)
- Blue, White and Perfect (1942) as Court Clerk (uncredited)
- All Through the Night (1942) as Reporter (uncredited)
- Call Out the Marines (1942) as Man at Racetrack (uncredited)
- Brooklyn Orchid (1942) as Party Guest (uncredited)
- Woman of the Year (1942) as Mr. Harding's Chauffeur (uncredited)
- Sleepytime Gal (1942) as Clerk (uncredited)
- Sing Your Worries Away (1942) as Bartender (uncredited)
- Yokel Boy (1942) as Reporter (uncredited)
- Secret Agent of Japan (1942) as American Businessman (uncredited)
- Saboteur (1942) as Party Guest (uncredited)
- Fingers at the Window (1942) as Psychiatrist at Lecture (uncredited)
- Hello, Annapolis (1942) as Reporter (uncredited)
- Home in Wyomin' (1942) as Monitor Man (uncredited)
- My Gal Sal (1942) as Loud Customer's Friend (uncredited)
- Take a Letter, Darling (1942) as Job Applicant / Nightclub Patron (uncredited)
- Dr. Broadway (1942) as Diner (uncredited)
- This Gun for Hire (1942) as Neptune Club Waiter (uncredited)
- Meet the Stewarts (1942) as Country Club Guest (uncredited)
- My Favorite Spy (1942) as Nightclub Patron (uncredited)
- It Happened in Flatbush (1942) as Reporter (uncredited)
- Maisie Gets Her Man (1942) as Dance Floor Extra (uncredited)
- The Magnificent Dope (1942) as Street Extra (uncredited)
- The Pride of the Yankees (1942) as Photographer (uncredited)
- Joan of Ozark (1942) as Reporter (uncredited)
- Priorities on Parade (1942) as Booking Agent (uncredited)
- Holiday Inn (1942) as Man in Montage (uncredited)
- Tales of Manhattan (1942) as Assistant Tailor (Boyer sequence) (uncredited)
- Sabotage Squad (1942) as Jefferson (uncredited)
- Across the Pacific (1942) as Canadian Officer (uncredited)
- The Glass Key (1942) as Campaign Headquarters Waiter (uncredited)
- Lucky Legs (1942) as Yacht Salesman (uncredited)
- Army Surgeon (1942) as Maj. Peterson (uncredited)
- The Navy Comes Through (1942) as Mr. Reynolds (uncredited)
- I Married a Witch (1942) as Country Club Extra (uncredited)
- Boston Blackie Goes Hollywood (1942) as Hotel Manager (uncredited)
- That Other Woman (1942) as Angry Businessman (uncredited)
- Silver Queen (1942) as Gambler (uncredited)
- Life Begins at Eight-Thirty (1942) as Box Office Man (uncredited)
- A Night to Remember (1942) as Restaurant Patron (uncredited)
- Pittsburgh (1942) as Mr. Wilcox (uncredited)
- The Traitor Within (1942) as Henchman (uncredited)
- Ice-Capades Revue (1942) as Creditor (uncredited)
- Over My Dead Body (1942) as Court Clerk
- The McGuerins from Brooklyn (1942) as Man at Roulette Table (uncredited)
- Happy Go Lucky (1943) as Nightclub Patron / Carnival Participant (uncredited)
- Margin for Error (1943) as Drugstore Clerk (uncredited)
- Immortal Sergeant (1943) as Man at Train Depot as Soldiers Depart (uncredited)
- The Hard Way (1943) as Nightclub Patron (uncredited)
- You Can't Beat the Law (1943) as Convict (uncredited)
- Reveille with Beverly (1943) as Radio Technician (uncredited)
- The Meanest Man in the World (1943) as Client (uncredited)
- The Amazing Mrs. Holliday (1943) as Party Guest (uncredited)
- Two Weeks to Live (1943) as Airplane Pilot (uncredited)
- Dixie Dugan (1943) (uncredited)
- Slightly Dangerous (1943) as Man Outside Newspaper Office (uncredited)
- She Has What It Takes (1943) as Photographer (uncredited)
- Good Morning, Judge (1943) as Elizabeth's Escort (uncredited)
- A Stranger in Town (1943) as Newspaper Reporter (uncredited)
- Bombardier (1943) as Capt. Randall (uncredited)
- Du Barry Was a Lady (1943) as Man Watching Radio Interview (uncredited)
- Mr. Lucky (1943) as Gambler (uncredited)
- The Constant Nymph (1943) as Party Guest (uncredited)
- Dixie (1943) as Fireman (uncredited)
- Batman (1943, Serial) as Restaurant Patron (uncredited)
- Hers to Hold (1943) as Photographer (uncredited)
- The Falcon in Danger (1943) as Man at Airport (uncredited)
- Let's Face It (1943) as Headwaiter (uncredited)
- The Fallen Sparrow (1943) as Henry as Headwaiter (uncredited)
- The Seventh Victim (1943) as Devil Worshipper (uncredited)
- Holy Matrimony (1943) as Mourner / Spectator at Westminster Abbey (uncredited)
- Melody Parade (1943) as Adams
- So This Is Washington (1943) as Second Hotel Desk Clerk (uncredited)
- The Adventures of a Rookie (1943) as Army Major with Dispatches (uncredited)
- The Kansan (1943) as Court Clerk (uncredited)
- Sweet Rosie O'Grady (1943) as Photographer (uncredited)
- The Unknown Guest (1943) as Pool Hall Proprietor (uncredited)
- The Iron Major (1943) as Ross (uncredited)
- Gildersleeve on Broadway (1943) as Nightclub Patron (uncredited)
- Swing Fever (1943) as Man Entering Club (uncredited)
- Mystery of the 13th Guest (1943) as John Barksdale as Lawyer
- Government Girl (1943) as Naval Lieutenant Commander (uncredited)
- The Mad Ghoul (1943) as Man in Audience (uncredited)
- The Dancing Masters (1943) as Bus Passenger (uncredited)
- Campus Rhythm (1943) as Trigonometry Teacher (uncredited)
- Where Are Your Children? (1943) as Juvenile Court Officer (uncredited)
- The Texas Kid (1943) as Tim Atwood
- There's Something About a Soldier (1943) as Officer at Graduation (uncredited)
- How to Operate Behind Enemy Lines (1943) as Enemy Agent X (uncredited)
- Night Club Patron (uncredited)
- Higher and Higher (1943) as Night Club Patron (uncredited)
- Henry Aldrich, Boy Scout (1944) as Scoring Official (uncredited)
- Timber Queen (1944) as Nightclub Patron (uncredited)
- The Fighting Seabees (1944) as Dance Extra (uncredited)
- Phantom Lady (1944) as Barfly with Racing Form (uncredited)
- Shine on Harvest Moon (1944) as Harmon, Mr. Harvey's Associate (uncredited)
- My Best Gal (1944) (uncredited)
- Hot Rhythm (1944) as Jackson
- And the Angels Sing (1944) as Casino Patron (uncredited)
- Follow the Boys (1944) as Laughtonpher (uncredited)
- The Story of Dr. Wassell (1944) as Dr. Holmes' Board Member (uncredited)
- Once Upon a Time (1944) as Man (uncredited)
- Mr. Skeffington (1944) as Perry Lanks (uncredited)
- Ladies of Washington (1944) as Crane's Secretary (uncredited)
- Ghost Catchers (1944) as Man in Tuxedo (uncredited)
- Christmas Holiday (1944) as Jury Member (uncredited)
- Secret Command (1944) as Parrish (uncredited)
- In Society (1944) as Sir Walter Raleigh at Party (uncredited)
- The Merry Monahans (1944) as Poker Player (uncredited)
- Laura (1944) as Party Guest (uncredited)
- Here Come the Waves (1944) as Lieutenant Colonel (uncredited)
- The Affairs of Susan (1945) as Mr. Hughes (uncredited)
- The Man in Half Moon Street (1945) as O'Hara—Plainclothesman (uncredited)
- Roughly Speaking (1945) as Lawyer (uncredited)
- Frisco Sal (1945) as Sightseer (uncredited)
- See My Lawyer (1945) as Man in the Mud Gag (uncredited)
- I'll Remember April (1945) as Advertising Executive (uncredited)
- Identity Unknown (1945) as Mr. Bartlett (uncredited)
- Having Wonderful Crime (1945) as Hotel Clerk (uncredited)
- Hollywood and Vine (1945) as Richard Hudson, Attorney (uncredited)
- The Bullfighters (1945) as Cafe Customer (uncredited)
- Where Do We Go from Here? (1945) as Capt. Williams (uncredited)
- Blonde Ransom (1945) as Patron (uncredited)
- The Naughty Nineties (1945) as Man in Water Gag (uncredited)
- On Stage Everybody (1945) as Onlooker (uncredited)
- The Cheaters (1945) as Steve, Private Detective (uncredited)
- Incendiary Blonde (1945) as New Year's Eve Patron (uncredited)
- Lady on a Train (1945) as Circus Club Ringmaster (uncredited)
- Swingin' on a Rainbow (1945) (uncredited)
- Beware of Redheads (1945, Short) as Ed Brooks
- Duffy's Tavern (1945) as Gaffer (uncredited)
- Senorita from the West (1945) as Bystander (uncredited)
- Diamond Horseshoe (1945)
- Girl on the Spot (1946) as Hobart (uncredited)
- Miss Susie Slagle's (1946) as Instrument Man (uncredited)
- The Strange Love of Martha Ivers (1946) as Nightclub Extra (uncredited)
- Our Hearts Were Growing Up (1946) as Hotel Desk Clerk (uncredited)
- Night and Day (1946) as Husband Outside Theatre (uncredited)
- Two Years Before the Mast (1946) as Ship Owner (uncredited)
- Nobody Lives Forever (1946) as Blonde's Escort (uncredited)
- Hollywood Barn Dance (1947) as Theatre Manager
- The Fabulous Joe (1947) as Bill (uncredited)
- Magic Town (1947) as Newspaper Man (uncredited)
- Nighmare Alley (1947) as Roustabout at Final Carnival (uncredited)
- Body and Soul (1947) as Victor as Butler (uncredited)
- The Flame (1947) as Mr. Moffett (uncredited)
- Return of the Bad Men (1948) as Ardmore Bank Clerk (uncredited)
- Hollow Triumph (1948) as Harry (uncredited)
- An Innocent Affair (1948) as Rocket Roof Maitre d' (uncredited)
- Tulsa (1949) as Dice Table Croupier (uncredited)
- Red, Hot and Blue (1949) as Reporter (uncredited)
- Iron Man (1951) as Headwaiter (uncredited) (final film role)
