= The Painted World (film) =

- Directed by: Ralph Ince
- Written by: Marguerite Bertsch; Jacques Futrelle
- Starring: Julia Swayne Gordon; Anita Stewart; Janice Cummings
- Production company: Vitagraph Company of America
- Distributed by: General Film Company
- Release dates: August 10, 1914 (New York City); September 26, 1914 (U.S.)
- Running time: 50 minutes
- Country: United States
- Languages: Silent film (English intertitles)

The Painted World is a 1914 American silent drama film directed by Ralph Ince and released by Vitagraph Studios.

== Plot ==
A successful vaudeville star, Eloise Murree, has a young daughter who she wants to protect from her unsavory profession and her dissolute father. She sends her Yvette to an upscale boarding school, where she is given the impression that her mother is a respectable, wealthy widow, who is constantly traveling. Occasionally, she is allowed home where she is suffocated by her mother's attentions. During one of these dreadful visits, Yvette encounters her father under conditions so strange, she is convinced by her mother that they were dreams, and that her mother's eye injury came from a fall. When Yvette completes her schooling, she returns home.

Late one night, after Eloise leaves the house, her drunken paramour informs Yvette that her mother is not a wealthy widow, but an actress. Not believing what she has heard, she dashes off to the theater, where she sees her scantily-clad mother posing for the audience. Eloise returns home to an empty house and Mr. Murree missing. Yvette's inherited traits come to the surface, and she falls prey easily to a manager introduced by her father. Intoxicated, Yvette enters the house and exchanges verbal blows with her mother and father, where Eloise, has realized that her daughter has followed in her footsteps. Wanting to save Yvette's soul, she stabs her daughter and then herself, leaving evidence that places guilt in the hands of Mr. Murree, who was the cause of all their sorrow.

== Cast ==
- Julia Swayne Gordon as Eloise Murree
- Anita Stewart as Yvette Murree
- Janice Cummings as Maid
- Harry Northrup as Murree
- R.A. Roberts as Manager

== Reception ==
The New York Clipper review was largely negative, praising the acting but criticizing for "it rather expounds the rural town's gossip narrow and bigoted view of stage folks."

Variety came to the same conclusion, lauding Julia Swayne Gordon's excellent performance in particular but similarly disappointed by the story "It is a pity that such good work should have been wasted on such a bad picture story."

== Censorship ==
The Chicago Board of Censors rejected the film in its entirety, refusing to grant a permit. The reasons given were of the degradation of the women, scenes of drunkenness, and women posing in the semi-nude.
