= The Adventure of the Italian Model =

1912 American silent film

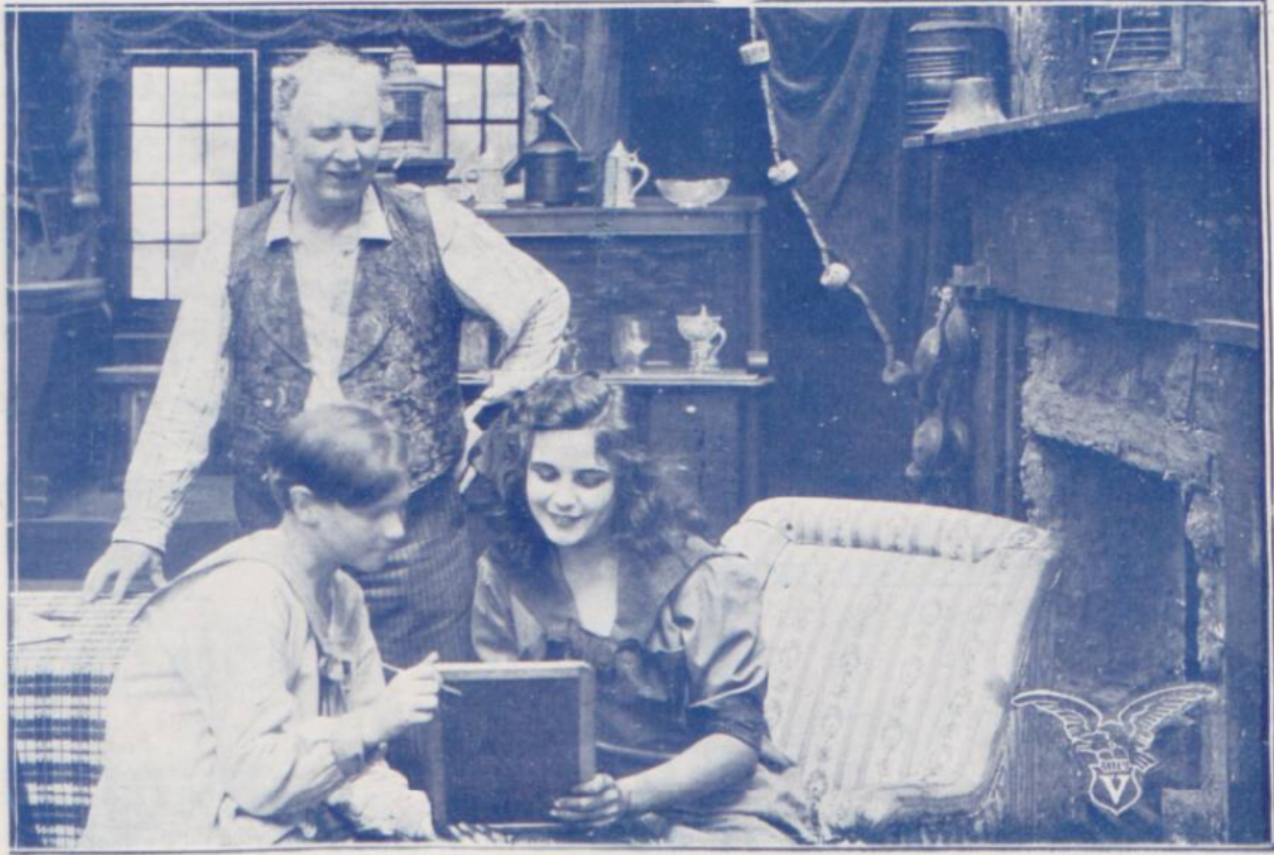
- Scene from the film.
- Directed by: Van Dyke Brooke
- Written by: Bertram Brooker
- Starring: Maurice Costello; Leah Baird; Rose Tapley; George Cooper
- Production company: Vitagraph Company of America
- Distributed by: General Film Company
- Release date: September 21, 1912
- Running time: 1 reel
- Country: United States
- Language: English intertitles

The Adventure of the Italian Model is a 1912 American silent drama short film, directed by Van Dyke Brooke, written by Bertram Brooker and produced by Vitagraph Studios. An incomplete copy of the film survives in the EYE Film Institute Netherlands archive.

== Plot ==
A young artist, Aubrey, invites his beautiful model for a glass of wine after work, but her jealous lover, Luigi, spies her through the window and pours poison into one of the glasses. Aubrey then unknowingly hands his model the poisoned wine, which she drinks and falls ill. A doctor is called and takes her home, but the artist is arrested despite asserting his innocence. The detective, Lambert Chase, is called to work on the case and learns that the model has a lover who visited her frequently, and so disguises himself as a woman. In his disguise, he investigates the model's house, where he sees Luigi stalking about the house. Luigi follows Chase, hoping to gain information about his lovers state, when Chase makes his status known and Luigi flees. He runs to the pier and throws himself into the water with Chase not far behind, who captures him after a great struggle. At the police station, he is taken to a specially arranged room. A table is placed in front of a window with heavy drapes, recreating the scene of the crime, where Luigi is cross-examined. He denies all knowledge until the curtain is thrown aside and a hand reaches out to put poison into one of the glasses on the table, where the suspect is so shocked, he readily admits to the poisoning.

== Cast ==
- Maurice Costello as Lambert Chase - the Detective
- James Morrison as Aubrey
- Leah Baird as the Model
- Rose Tapley as the Model's Mother
- George Cooper as Luigi - the Model's Rejected Suitor

== Reception ==
Moving Picture World's review was positive and praised the story as "deeply intelligent."
