= Divorce Coupons =

1922 film

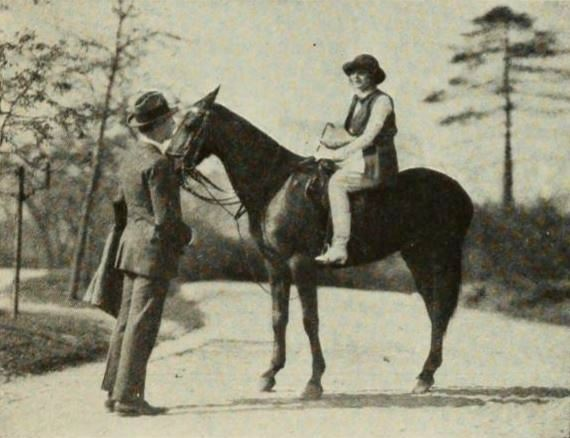
- Directed by: Webster Campbell
- Written by: William B. Courtney
- Produced by: Albert E. Smith
- Starring: Corinne Griffith; Holmes Herbert; Cyril Ring
- Cinematography: Joseph Shelderfer
- Production company: Vitagraph Company of America
- Distributed by: Vitagraph Company of America
- Release date: July 2, 1922
- Running time: 60 minutes
- Country: United States
- Languages: Silent; English intertitles

Divorce Coupons is a 1922 American silent drama film directed by Webster Campbell and starring Corinne Griffith, Holmes Herbert and Cyril Ring.

== Cast ==
- Corinne Griffith as Linda Catherton
- Holmes Herbert as Roland Bland
- Mona Lisa as Ishtar Lane
- Diana Allen as Teddy Beaudine
- Cyril Ring as Conrad Fontaine
- Vincent Coleman as Buddy

== Bibliography ==
- Munden, Kenneth White. The American Film Institute Catalog of Motion Pictures Produced in the United States, Part 1. University of California Press, 1997.
