= The Vengeance of Durand =

1919 silent film

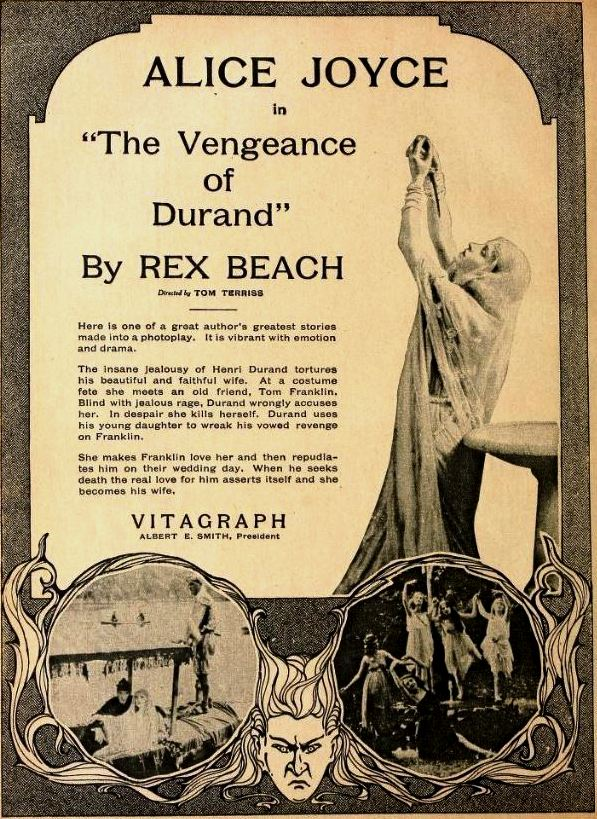
- Directed by: Tom Terriss
- Written by: Rex Beach (novel); George Randolph Chester; Lillian Christy Chester
- Produced by: Albert E. Smith
- Starring: Alice Joyce; Gustav von Seyffertitz; Percy Marmont
- Cinematography: Joseph Shelderfer
- Production company: Vitagraph Company of America
- Distributed by: Vitagraph Company of America
- Release date: November 5, 1919
- Running time: 70 minutes
- Country: United States
- Languages: Silent; English intertitles

The Vengeance of Durand is a 1919 American silent drama film directed by Tom Terriss and starring Alice Joyce, Gustav von Seyffertitz and Percy Marmont. It was a remake of an earlier short film of the same title made by Vitagraph Studios.

== Cast ==
- Alice Joyce as Marion Durand / Beatrice Durand
- Gustav von Seyffertitz as Henri Durand
- Percy Marmont as Tom Franklin
- William Bechtel as Armand La Farge
- Eugene Strong as Captain St. Croix Trouvier
- H.H. Pattee as Theophile
- Mark Smith as 'Tubby' Livingston

== Bibliography ==
- Phillips, Alastair & Vincendeau, Ginette. Journeys of Desire: European Actors in Hollywood. British Film Institute, 2006.
