= The Lion and the Mouse (1919 film) =

1919 film by Tom Terriss

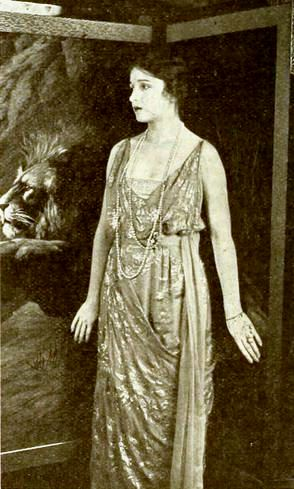
- Still with Alice Joyce
- Directed by: Tom Terriss
- Written by: Charles Klein (play); Edward J. Montagne (scenario)
- Produced by: Vitagraph Company of America; Albert E. Smith
- Starring: Alice Joyce
- Cinematography: Joseph Shelderfer
- Distributed by: Vitagraph Company of America
- Release date: February 16, 1919
- Running time: 60 minutes; 6 reels
- Country: United States
- Language: Silent (English intertitles)

The Lion and the Mouse is a lost 1919 American silent drama film produced and released by the Vitagraph Company of America. It was directed by Tom Terriss and based on the famous Charles Klein play. Alice Joyce starred in the film.

Previously filmed in 1914, the story was later remade at the dawn of sound in 1928 by Vitagraph's purchaser Warner Brothers as The Lion and the Mouse with Lionel Barrymore.

== Plot ==
As described in a film magazine, John Burkett Ryder, "the richest man in the world," seeks to discredit a judicial decision which works against his financial interests by discrediting its author, Judge Rossmore, and has impeachment charges initiated against the judge in Congress. Shirley Rossmore, the judge's daughter, learns of her father's trouble and returns from Paris, where she has won success as an author. She is loved by Jefferson Ryder, son of the magnet. Determined to force the millionaire's hand, she publishes The American Octopus under a pseudonym with a main character based upon Burkett. He is attracted by the book and brings its author Shirley, whom he knows as Sarah Green, into his home to write his biography. She uses this opportunity as the chance to obtain two letters that will clear her father's name. Jefferson aids her in obtaining the documents, but is discovered and denounced as a thief. Shirley cannot allow the man she loves so branded, so she reveals her identity. The millionaire "lion" had already been won over by the charm of the "mouse," so there is a happy resolution.

== Cast ==
- Alice Joyce – Shirley Rossmore
- Conrad Nagel – Jefferson Ryder
- Anders Randolf – John Burkett Ryder
- Henry Hallam – Judge Rossmore
- William T. Carleton – Sen. Roberts (*as W. T. Carlton)
- Mona Kingsley – Kate Roberts
- Jane Jennings – Mrs. Ryder
- W. H. Burton – Judge Scott
- Templar Saxe – Fitzroy Bagley (*as Templer Saxe)
- Mary Carr – Eudoxia
