= Human Collateral =

1920 film

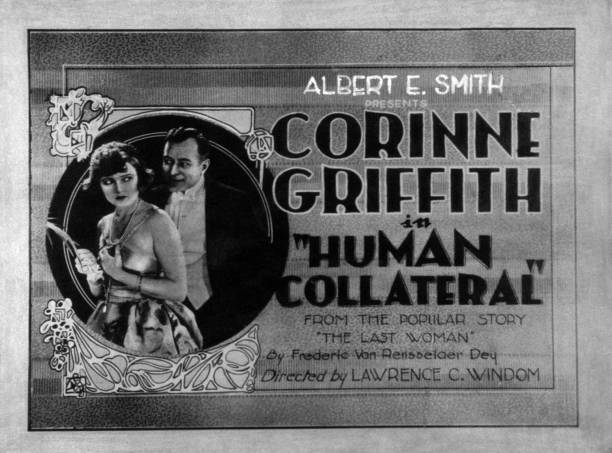
- Directed by: Lawrence C. Windom
- Written by: Sam Taylor
- Based on: The Last Woman by Frederic Van Rensselaer Dey
- Produced by: Albert E. Smith
- Starring: Corinne Griffith; Webster Campbell; Maurice Costello
- Production company: Vitagraph Company of America
- Distributed by: Vitagraph Company of America
- Release date: January 13, 1920
- Running time: 50 minutes
- Country: United States
- Languages: Silent; English intertitles

Human Collateral is a 1920 American silent drama film directed by Lawrence C. Windom and starring Corinne Griffith, Webster Campbell and Maurice Costello. It is now considered to be a lost film.

== Cast ==
- Corinne Griffith as Patricia Langdon
- Webster Campbell as Roderick Duncan
- Maurice Costello as Richard Morton
- William T. Carleton as Stephen Langdon
- Charles Kent as Malcolm Melvin
- Alice Calhoun as Beatrice Bruswick

== Bibliography ==
- Connelly, Robert B. The Silents: Silent Feature Films, 1910-36, Volume 40, Issue 2. December Press, 1998.
- Munden, Kenneth White. The American Film Institute Catalog of Motion Pictures Produced in the United States, Part 1. University of California Press, 1997.
