= The Sea Rider =

1920 film

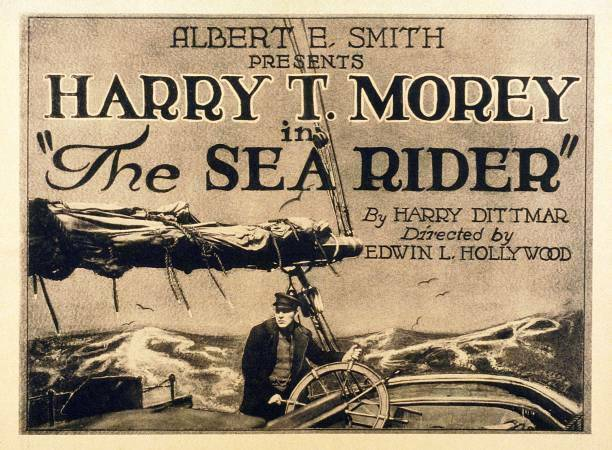
- Directed by: Edwin L. Hollywood
- Written by: Harry Dittmar; Fred Schaefer
- Starring: Harry T. Morey; Webster Campbell; Alice Calhoun
- Cinematography: William McCoy
- Production company: Vitagraph Company of America
- Distributed by: Vitagraph Company of America
- Release date: June 1920
- Running time: 50 minutes
- Country: United States
- Language: Silent (English intertitles)

The Sea Rider is a 1920 American silent drama film directed by Edwin L. Hollywood and starring Harry T. Morey, Webster Campbell, and Alice Calhoun.

== Cast ==
- Harry T. Morey as Stephen Hardy
- Webster Campbell as Tom Hardy
- Van Dyke Brooke as Captain Halcomb
- Alice Calhoun as Bess Halcomb
- Louiszita Valentine as The Girl
- Frank Norcross as Squire Toler

== Bibliography ==
- Connelly, Robert B. The Silents: Silent Feature Films, 1910-36, Volume 40, Issue 2. December Press, 1998.
- McCaffrey, Donald W. & Jacobs, Christopher P. Guide to the Silent Years of American Cinema. Greenwood Publishing, 1999. ISBN 0-313-30345-2
- Munden, Kenneth White. The American Film Institute Catalog of Motion Pictures Produced in the United States, Part 1. University of California Press, 1997.
