= The Fettered Woman =

1917 film by Tom Terriss

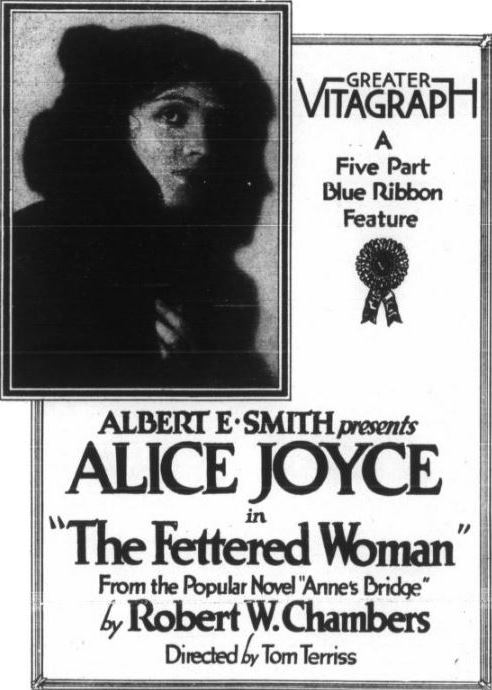
- Directed by: Tom Terriss
- Written by: Garfield Thompson
- Based on: Anne's Bridge by Robert W. Chambers
- Starring: Alice Joyce; Webster Campbell; Donald MacBride
- Cinematography: Joseph Shelderfer
- Production company: Vitagraph Company of America
- Distributed by: V-L-S-E
- Release date: November 5, 1917
- Running time: 5 reels
- Country: United States
- Language: Silent (English intertitles)

The Fettered Woman is a 1917 American silent drama film directed by Tom Terriss and starring Alice Joyce, Webster Campbell, and Donald MacBride. It was adapted for the screen by Garfield Thompson from the 1914 novel Anne's Bridge by Robert W. Chambers.

== Cast ==
- Alice Joyce as Angelina Allende
- Webster Campbell as James Deane
- Donald MacBride as Jack Wolver
- Lionel Grey as Tobe
- Templar Saxe as Adolph Bink

== Production ==
The film was one of four produced by Vitagraph as part of their "Best Authors" series. The other films were Dead Shot Baker, The Bottom of the Well, and I Will Repay (1917).

== Preservation ==
The Fettered Woman is currently presumed lost. In February of 2021, the film was cited by the National Film Preservation Board on their Lost U.S. Silent Feature Films list.

== Bibliography ==
- Donald W. McCaffrey & Christopher P. Jacobs. Guide to the Silent Years of American Cinema. Greenwood Publishing, 1999. ISBN 0-313-30345-2
