= The Pace That Thrills (1925 film) =

1925 American silent drama film

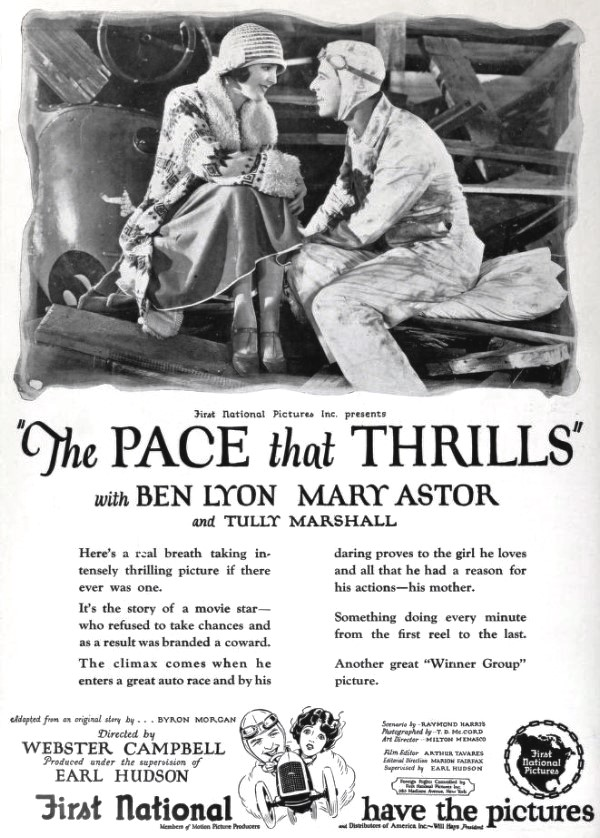
- Advertisement
- Directed by: Webster Campbell
- Written by: John W. Krafft (titles)
- Story by: Byron Morgan
- Starring: Ben Lyon; Mary Astor; Charles Byer
- Cinematography: Ted D. McCord
- Edited by: John W. Krafft
- Production company: First National Pictures
- Distributed by: First National Pictures
- Release date: October 18, 1925
- Running time: 76 minutes
- Country: United States
- Language: Silent (English intertitles)

The Pace That Thrills is a 1925 American silent drama film directed by Webster Campbell and starring Ben Lyon, Mary Astor, and Charles Byer. It was released by First National.

== Plot ==
As described in a film magazine review, a motion picture actor, whose mother is in prison for the murder of her drunken husband, refuses to take chances with his life on the lot and is considered a coward. He dare not risk accident and the consequent curtailment of his earning power because he needs money to secure his mother’s pardon. He is secretly in love with his producer’s daughter, but she too thinks him cowardly. However, he proves himself in a quick succession of events, and frees his mother and wins the affections of the young woman.

== Cast ==
- Ben Lyon as Danny Wade
- Mary Astor as Doris
- Charles Byer as Duke
- Tully Marshall as Hezekiah Sims
- Wheeler Oakman as Director
- Thomas Holding as John Van Loren
- Evelyn Walsh Hall as Mrs. Van Loren
- Warner Richmond as Jack Van Loren
- Fritzi Brunette as Paula
- Paul Ellis as Toreador

== Preservation ==
With no prints of The Pace That Thrills located in any film archives, it is a lost film.

== Bibliography ==
- Lowe, Denise. An Encyclopedic Dictionary of Women in Early American Films: 1895-1930. Routledge, 2014.
