= What's Your Reputation Worth? =

1921 film by Webster Campbell

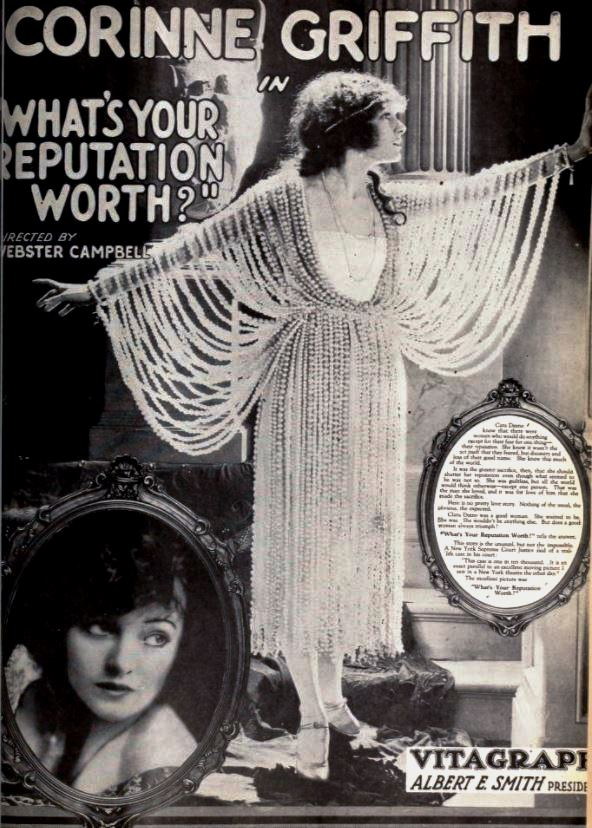
- Directed by: Webster Campbell
- Written by: Heliodore Tenno; C. Graham Baker; Harry Dittmar
- Produced by: Albert E. Smith
- Starring: Corinne Griffith; Percy Marmont; Leslie Roycroft
- Cinematography: Arthur Ross
- Production company: Vitagraph Company of America
- Distributed by: Vitagraph Company of America
- Release date: March 1921
- Running time: 60 minutes
- Country: United States
- Language: Silent (English intertitles)

What's Your Reputation Worth? is a lost 1921 American silent drama film directed by Webster Campbell and starring Corinne Griffith, Percy Marmont, and Leslie Roycroft.

== Cast ==
- Corinne Griffith as Cara Deene
- Percy Marmont as Anthony Blake
- Leslie Roycroft as Wallace Trant
- George Howard as Kent Jerrold
- Robert Gaillard as Mr. Pettus
- Jane Jennings as Mrs. Pettus
- Louise Prussing as Mrs. Blake

== Bibliography ==
- Munden, Kenneth White. The American Film Institute Catalog of Motion Pictures Produced in the United States, Part 1. University of California Press, 1997.
