= The Glory of Yolanda =

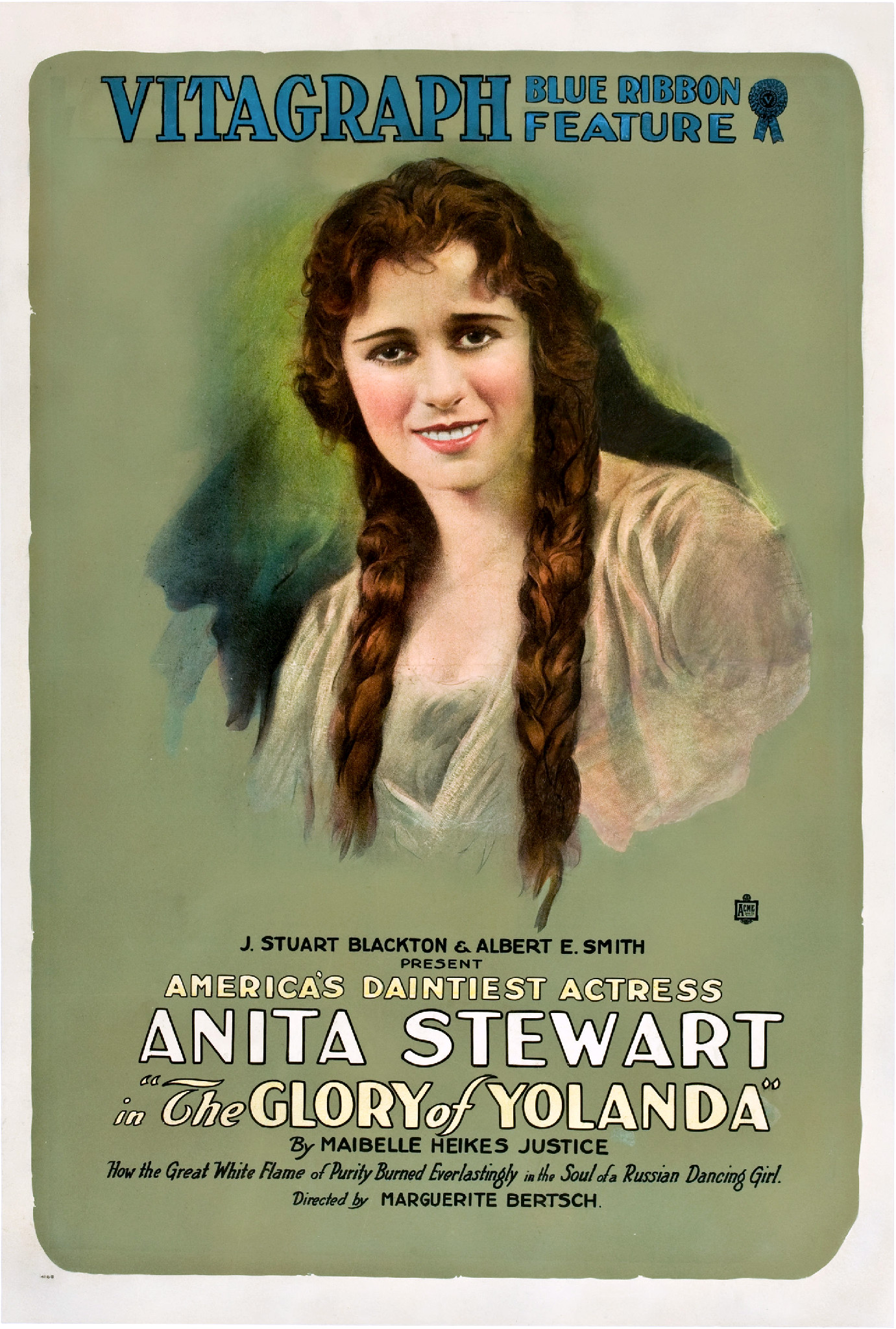
- Film poster
- Directed by: Marguerite Bertsch
- Written by: Maibelle Heikes Justice
- Produced by: Vitagraph Company of America (Blue Ribbon brand)
- Starring: Anita Stewart
- Cinematography: Fred Held
- Distributed by: V-L-S-E, Incorporated
- Release date: January 20, 1917
- Running time: 5 reels
- Country: United States
- Language: Silent (English intertitles)

The Glory of Yolanda is a 1917 American silent romantic drama film directed by Marguerite Bertsch and starring Anita Stewart. It was produced by the Vitagraph Company of America and distributed by V-L-S-E, a releasing company whose name is composed of the initials of Vitagraph, Lubin, Selig and Essanay.

== Cast ==
- Anita Stewart as Yolanda
- John Ardizoni as Grand Duke Boris
- Denton Vane as Prince Drolinski
- Evart Overton as Alexander
- Mr. Turin as Serge
- Bernard Siegel as Paul
- Madam Roimonda as Olga

== Preservation ==
With no prints of The Glory of Yolanda located in any film archives, it is a lost film.
