= It Isn't Being Done This Season =

1921 film

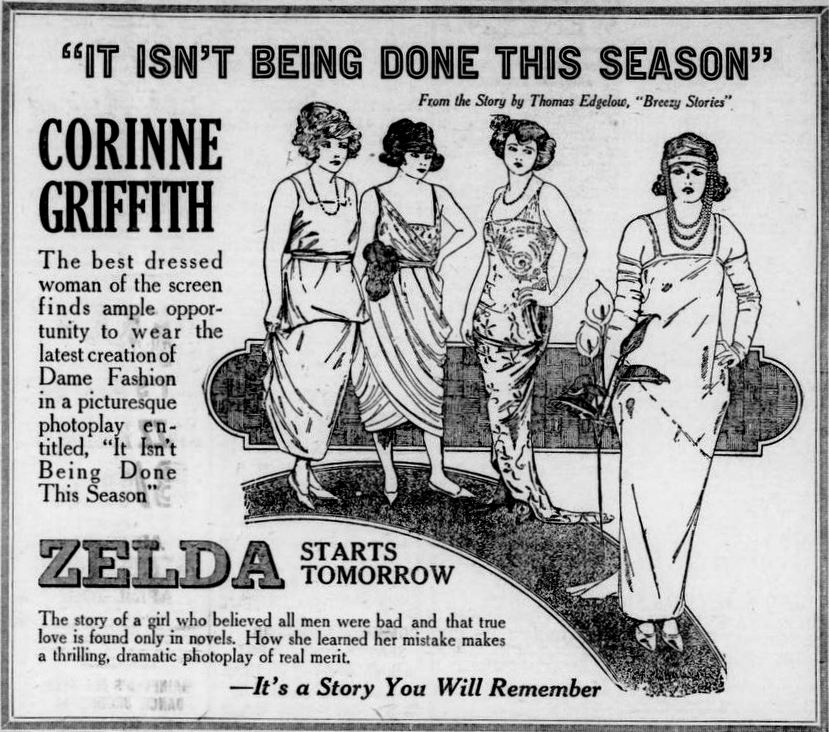
- Directed by: George L. Sargent
- Written by: C. Graham Baker; Harry Dittmar
- Starring: Corinne Griffith; Catherine Calvert; Harry C. Browne
- Cinematography: Arthur Ross
- Production company: Vitagraph Company of America
- Distributed by: Vitagraph Company of America
- Release date: January 1921
- Running time: 50 minutes
- Country: United States
- Languages: Silent; English intertitles

It Isn't Being Done This Season is a 1921 American silent drama film directed by George L. Sargent and starring Corinne Griffith, Sally Crute and Webster Campbell.

== Plot ==
Following her mother's advice to marry for money, Marcia turns down Oliver the man she loves to marry the wealthy George Hunt and accompanies him to Turkey on a business trip.

== Cast ==
- Corinne Griffith as Marcia Ventnor
- Sally Crute as Isabelle Ventnor
- Webster Campbell as Oliver Lawton
- John Charles as Afeif Bey
- Charles Wellesley as George Hunt

== Bibliography ==
- Connelly, Robert B. The Silents: Silent Feature Films, 1910-36, Volume 40, Issue 2. December Press, 1998.
- Munden, Kenneth White. The American Film Institute Catalog of Motion Pictures Produced in the United States, Part 1. University of California Press, 1997.
