= The Fortune Hunter (1920 film) =

1920 film

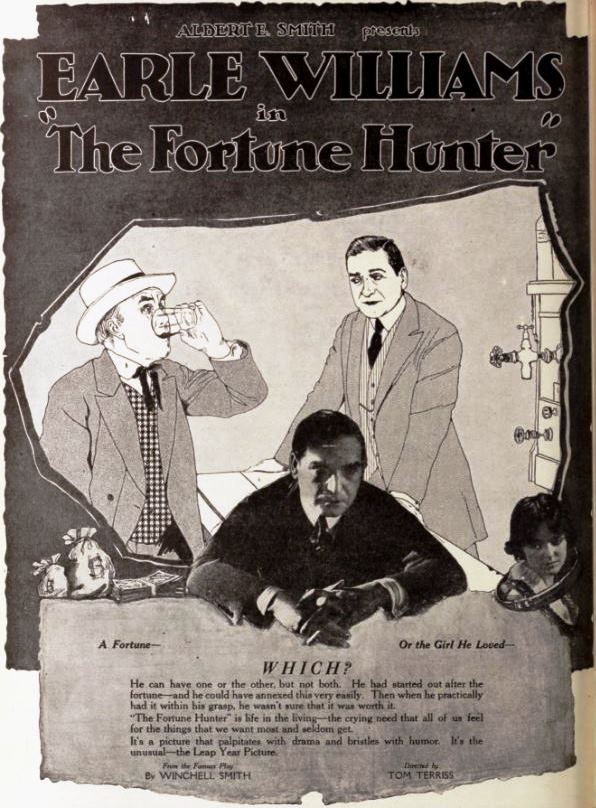
- advertisement
- Directed by: Tom Terriss
- Written by: Graham Baker; Don Bartlett(titles)
- Based on: play The Fortune Hunter by Winchell Smith c.1909
- Produced by: Vitagraph Company of America
- Starring: Earle Williams; Jean Paige
- Cinematography: Tom Malloy
- Edited by: Don Bartlett
- Distributed by: Vitagraph Company of America
- Release date: February 1920
- Running time: 7 reels
- Country: USA
- Language: Silent...English titles

The Fortune Hunter is a lost 1920 silent film comedy directed by Tom Terriss. It is based on a 1909 stage play by Winchell Smith. It stars Earle Williams and Jean Paige and was produced by the Vitagraph Company of America.

== Cast ==
- Earle Williams – Nathaniel Dunham
- Jean Paige – Betty Graham
- Van Dyke Brooke – Sam Graham
- Nancy Lee – Josie Lockwood
- William Holden – Banker Lockwood
- Charles Trowbridge – Harry Kellogg
- Frank Norcross – Sheriff Pete Willing
- Billy Hoover – Tracey
- Louise Lee – Angie
- Earl Metcalfe – Roland Barnett
