= The Woman Between Friends =

1918 drama film by Tom Terriss,

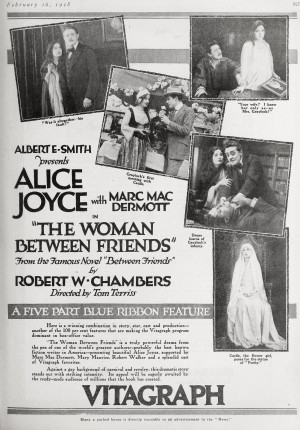
- Directed by: Tom Terriss
- Written by: Tom Terriss
- Based on: Between Friends by Robert W. Chambers
- Produced by: Albert E. Smith
- Starring: Alice Joyce; Marc McDermott; Robert Walker
- Cinematography: Joe Shelderfer
- Production company: Vitagraph
- Distributed by: Greater Vitagraph, Inc.
- Release date: February 11, 1918 (US)
- Running time: 5 reels
- Country: United States
- Language: Silent (English intertitles)

The Woman Between Friends is a 1918 American silent drama film written and directed by Tom Terriss that was based on the novel Between Friends by Robert W. Chambers. The film stars Alice Joyce, Marc McDermott, and Robert Walker. It was remade in 1924 as Between Friends.

== Cast ==
- Alice Joyce as Cecelie
- Marc McDermott as John Drene
- Robert Walker as Jack Graylock
- Edith Speare as Mrs. John Drene
- Katherine Lewis as Cecelie's sister
- Mary Maurice
- A. B. Conkwright
- Bernard Seigel

== Production ==
During filming, Walker accidentally shot at himself but was not injured.
