= The Captain's Captain =

1919 film by Tom Terriss

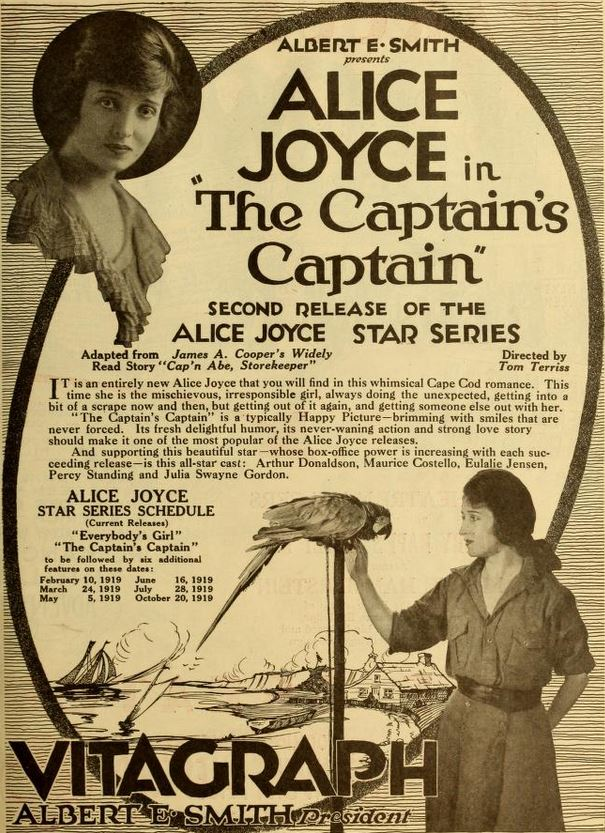
- Advertisement
- Directed by: Tom Terriss
- Written by: Tom Terriss (scenario); A. Van Buren Powell (scenario)
- Based on: Cap'n Abe Storekeeper, a Story of Cape Cod by James A. Cooper
- Produced by: Vitagraph Company of America
- Starring: Alice Joyce
- Cinematography: Joe Shelderfer
- Distributed by: Greater Vitagraph
- Release date: January 6, 1919
- Running time: 5 reels
- Country: USA
- Language: Silent..English intertitles

The Captain's Captain is a lost 1919 silent film comedy drama directed by Tom Terriss and starring Alice Joyce. It is based on a novel by James A. Cooper. It was produced and released by Vitagraph Company of America.

== Cast ==
- Alice Joyce – Louise Greyling
- Arthur Donaldson – Cap'n Abe/Am'zon
- Percy Standing – Cap'n Joab
- Julia Swayne Gordon – Aun Euphemia
- Eulalie Jensen – Betty Gallup
- Maurice Costello – Lawford Tapp
