= The Tower of Jewels =

1919 film

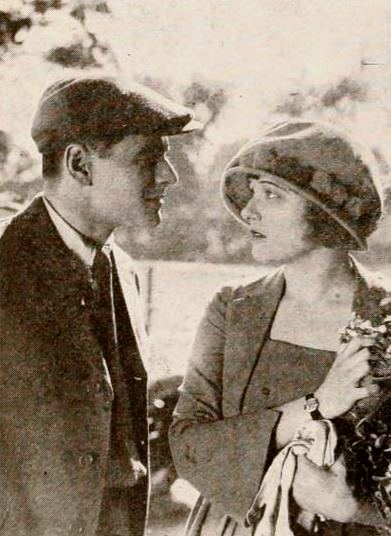
- Directed by: Tom Terriss
- Written by: Lucien Hubbard
- Starring: Corinne Griffith; Maurice Costello; Estelle Taylor
- Cinematography: Tom Malloy
- Edited by: George Randolph Chester; Lillian Christy Chester
- Production company: Vitagraph Company of America
- Distributed by: Vitagraph Company of America
- Release date: December 1919
- Running time: 50 minutes
- Country: United States
- Languages: Silent; English intertitles

The Tower of Jewels is a 1919 American silent crime film directed by Tom Terriss and starring Corinne Griffith, Maurice Costello and Estelle Taylor.

== Cast ==
- Corinne Griffith as Emily Cottrell
- Webster Campbell as Wayne Parrish
- Henry Stephenson as David Parrish
- Maurice Costello as Fraser Grimstead
- Charles Halton as Jimmy the Rat
- Estelle Taylor as Adele Warren
- Edward Elkas as Bornheim
- Charles Craig as Drew

== Bibliography ==
- Connelly, Robert B. The Silents: Silent Feature Films, 1910-36, Volume 40, Issue 2. December Press, 1998.
