= Moral Fibre =

1921 American silent film

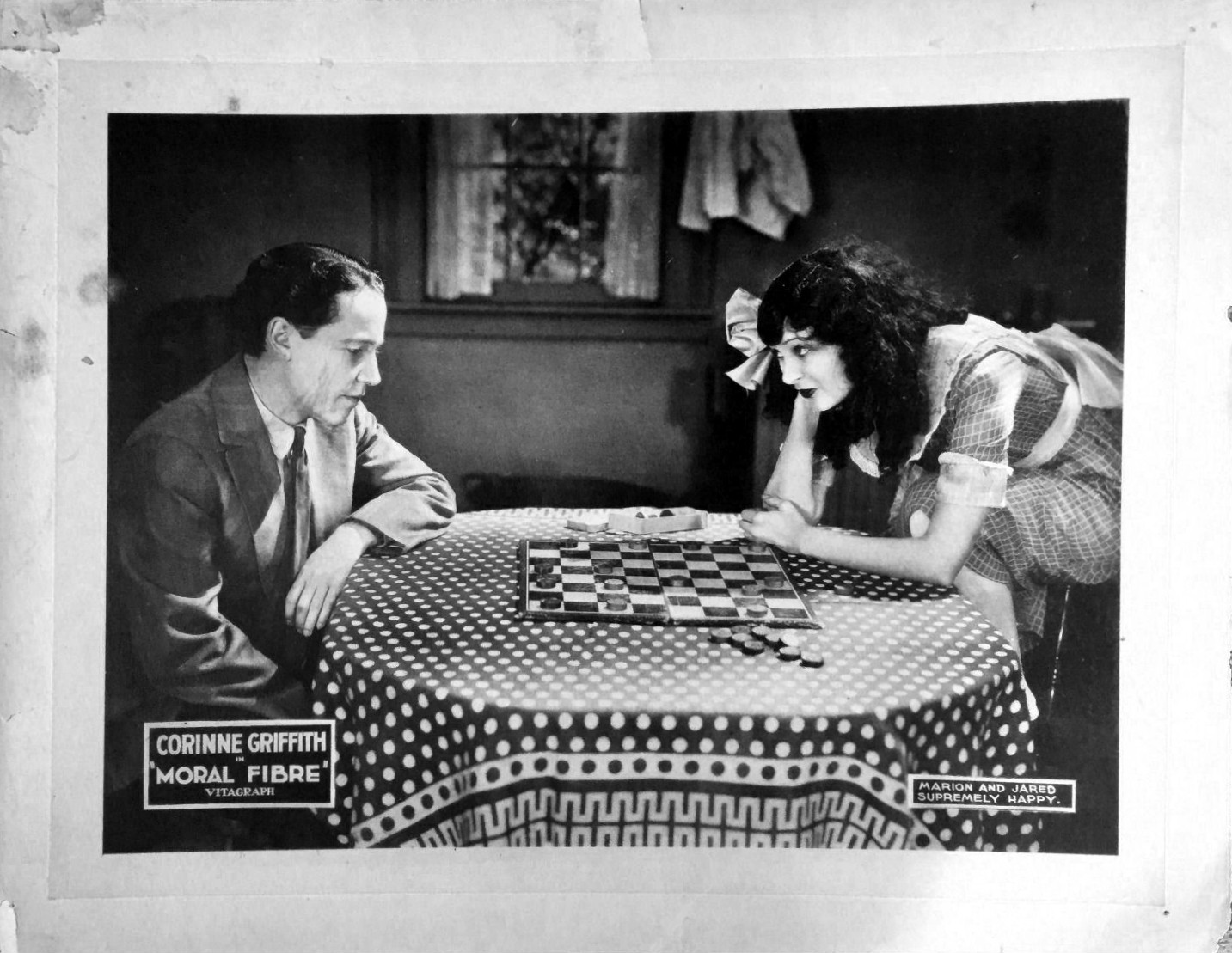
- Directed by: Webster Campbell
- Written by: William B. Courtney; William Harrison Goadby
- Starring: Corinne Griffith; Catherine Calvert; Harry C. Browne
- Production company: Vitagraph Company of America
- Distributed by: Vitagraph Company of America
- Release date: September 18, 1921
- Running time: 60 minutes
- Country: United States
- Languages: Silent; English intertitles

Moral Fibre is a 1921 American silent drama film directed by Webster Campbell and starring Corinne Griffith, Catherine Calvert and Harry C. Browne.

== Cast ==
- Corinne Griffith as Marion Wolcott
- Catherine Calvert as Grace Elmore
- William Parke Jr. as Jared Wolcott
- Harry C. Browne as George Elmore
- Joe King as John Corliss
- Alice Concord as Nancy Bartley

== Bibliography ==
- Connelly, Robert B. The Silents: Silent Feature Films, 1910–36, Volume 40, Issue 2. December Press, 1998.
- Munden, Kenneth White. The American Film Institute Catalog of Motion Pictures Produced in the United States, Part 1. University of California Press, 1997.
