= Webster Campbell =

American actor

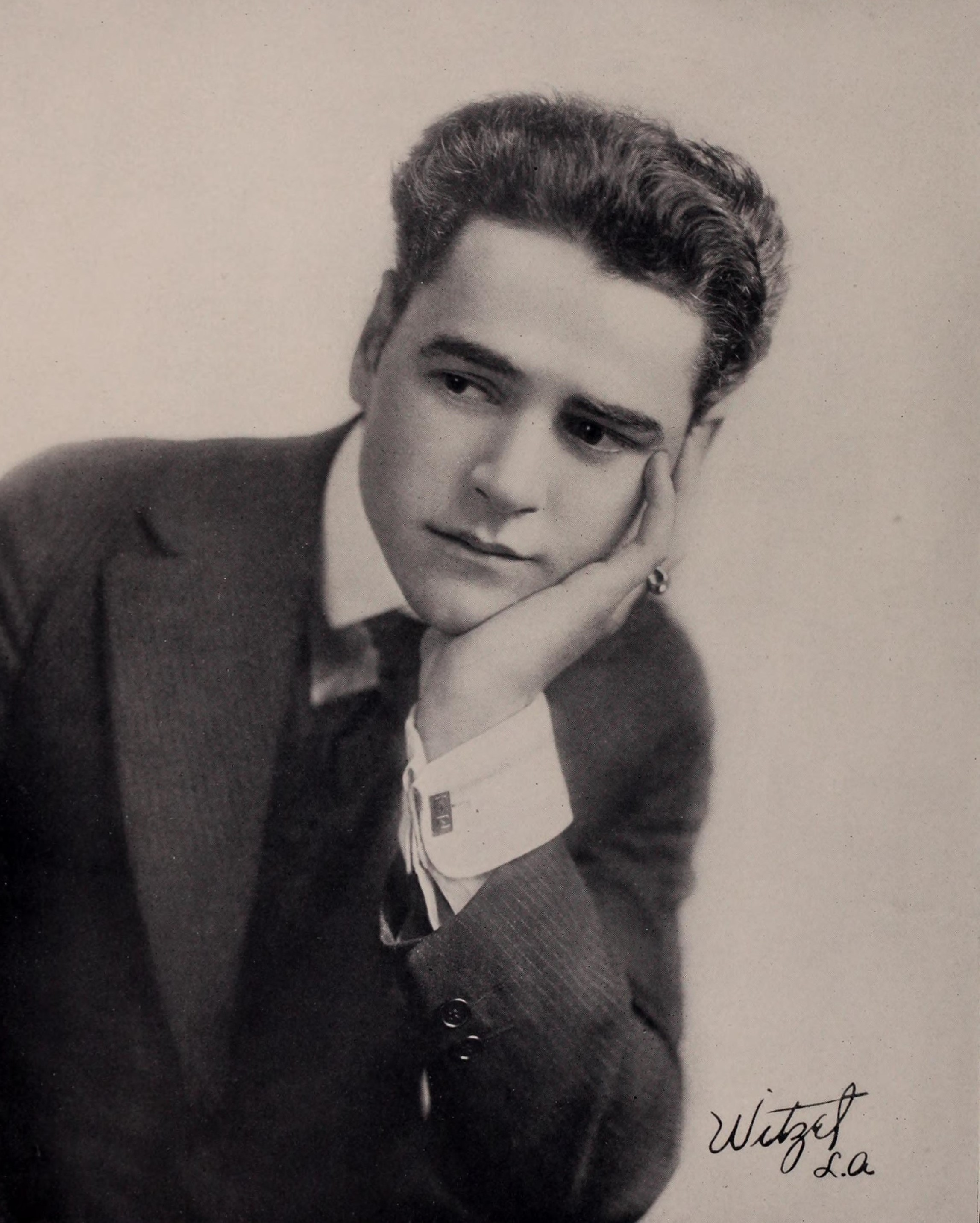
- Campbell in 1915
- Born: William Webster Campbell; January 25, 1893; Kansas City, Kansas, U.S.
- Died: August 28, 1972 (aged 79); US
- Occupations: Actor, director, screenwriter
- Years active: 1913–1930
- Spouses: Corinne Griffith (m. 1920; div. 1923): Beatrice Campbell (m. 1959–72; his death)

Webster Campbell (January 25, 1893 – August 28, 1972) was an American silent film actor, director, and screenwriter. He began screenwriting in 1913 and became an actor in 1915. He became primarily a director in 1921. By 1936, he retired and wrote short stories.

== Partial filmography ==
- Drawing the Line (1915)
- The Evil Eye (1917)
- The Fettered Woman (1917)
- The Tower of Jewels (1919)
- Babs (1920)
- Human Collateral (1920)
- The Sea Rider (1920)
- The Pleasure Seekers (1920)
- What's Your Reputation Worth? (1921)
- It Isn't Being Done This Season (1921)
- Moral Fibre (1921)
- Divorce Coupons (1922)
- The Single Track (1921) (director)
- Island Wives (1922) (director)
- The Pace That Thrills (1925) (director)
- The Love Racket (1929)
- In the Next Room (1930)
