= Island Wives =

1922 film by Webster Campbell

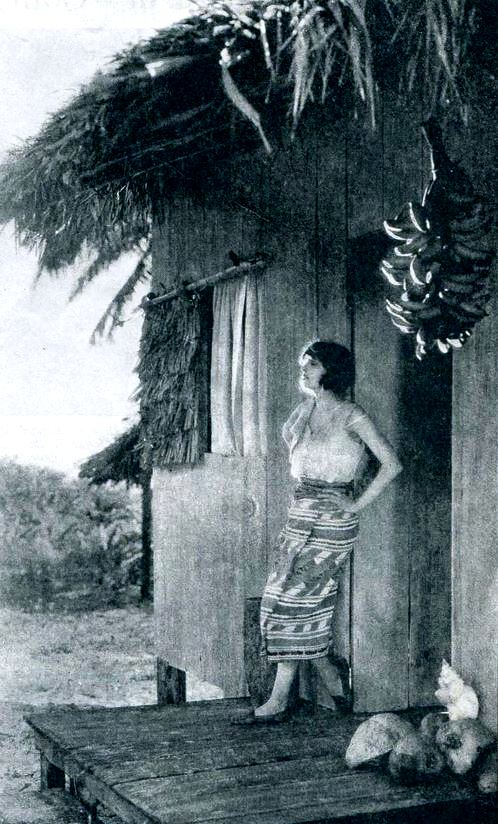
- Corinne Griffith
- Directed by: Webster Campbell
- Written by: William B. Courtney
- Story by: Bob Dexter
- Produced by: Vitagraph Company of America
- Starring: Corinne Griffith
- Cinematography: Arthur Ross
- Distributed by: Vitagraph Company of America
- Release date: March 12, 1922
- Running time: 5 reels; 4,994 feet
- Country: United States
- Language: Silent (English intertitles)

Island Wives is a lost 1922 American silent adventure drama film directed by Webster Campbell and starring Corinne Griffith. The Vitagraph Company of America produced and distributed. Some of the film was shot in Florida.

The famous writer John Galsworthy played a role in this film.

== Plot ==
As described in a film magazine, Elsa (Griffith) and Jimmy Melton (Trowbridge) live on the isle of Tahiti where Jimmy is the assistant manager of a trading station. Elsa longs for the cool of the North where she can wear fine clothes and associate with her people. Her husband goes to a distant island where he is overtaken by a terrific storm. Elsa, terrified, goes down to the beach where she is overcome by exhaustion. She is picked up by Hitchens (Fellowes), the owner of a passing yacht. Thinking her husband is dead after using Hitchens' radio, she later marries Hitchens. In San Francisco, she learns that Hitchens has other affairs and threatens to divorce him. He then tells her that their marriage is not legal as they were married by the captain while within the three-mile limit of land. Hitchens plans another trip to Tahiti and Elsa accompanies him. On the island she meets Jimmy, who survived the storm's fury. He accepts Elsa's explanation and follows Hitchens, who jumps into the sea and is killed by a shark. Elsa and Jimmy are happily reunited when Jimmy is transferred to Sydney, where Elsa will no longer be an island wife.

== Cast ==
- Corinne Griffith as Elsa Melton
- Charles Trowbridge as Jimmy
- Rockliffe Fellowes as Hitchens
- Ivan Christy as McMasters
- Edna Hibbard as Piala
- Norman Rankow as Bibo
- Peggy Parr as McMasters' Native Wife
- J. Barney Sherry as Yacht Captain
- John Galsworthy as Lester
- Mrs. Trowbridge as Mrs. Lester
