= Tom Terriss =

British actor and screenwriter (1872–1964)

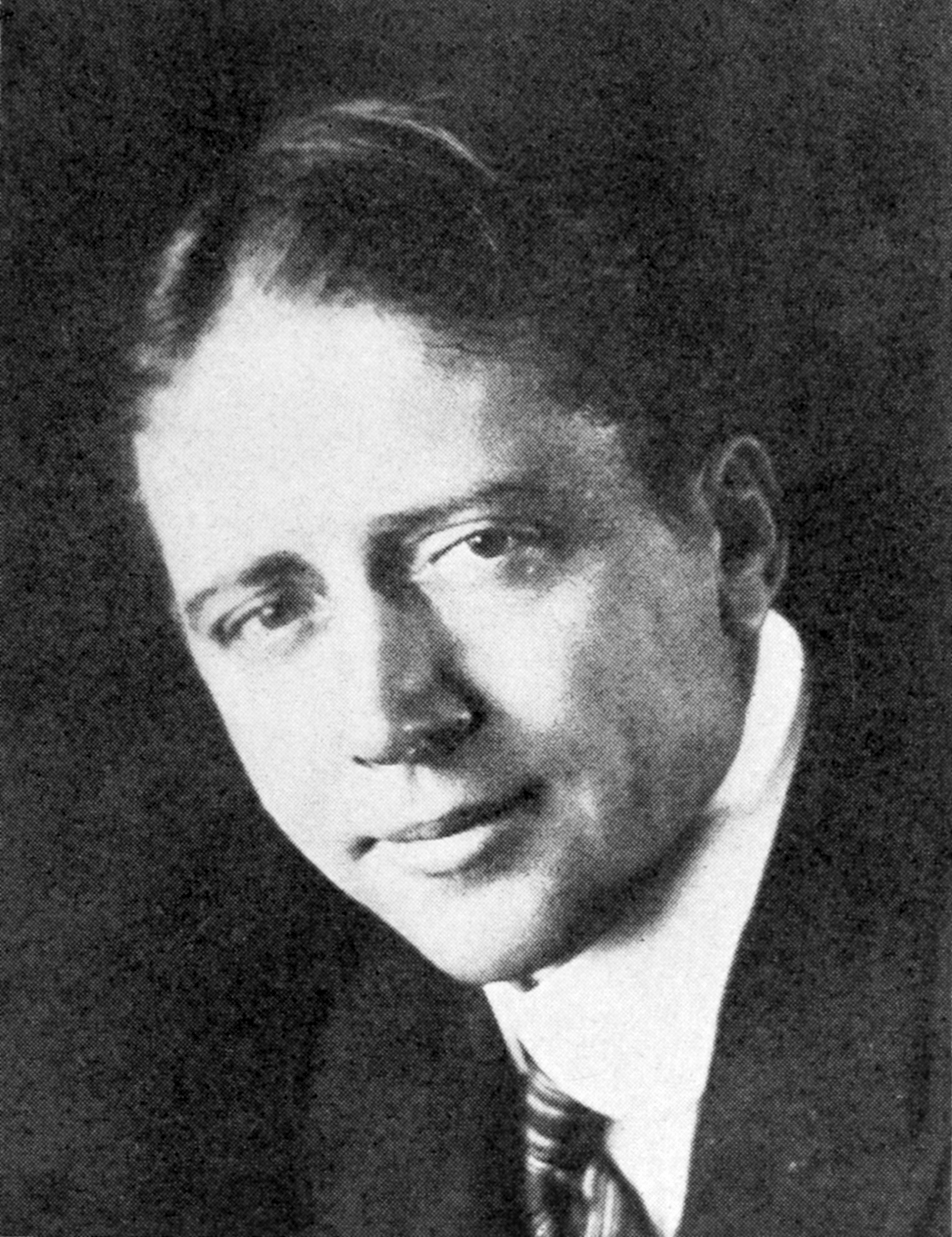
Tom Terriss (1921)

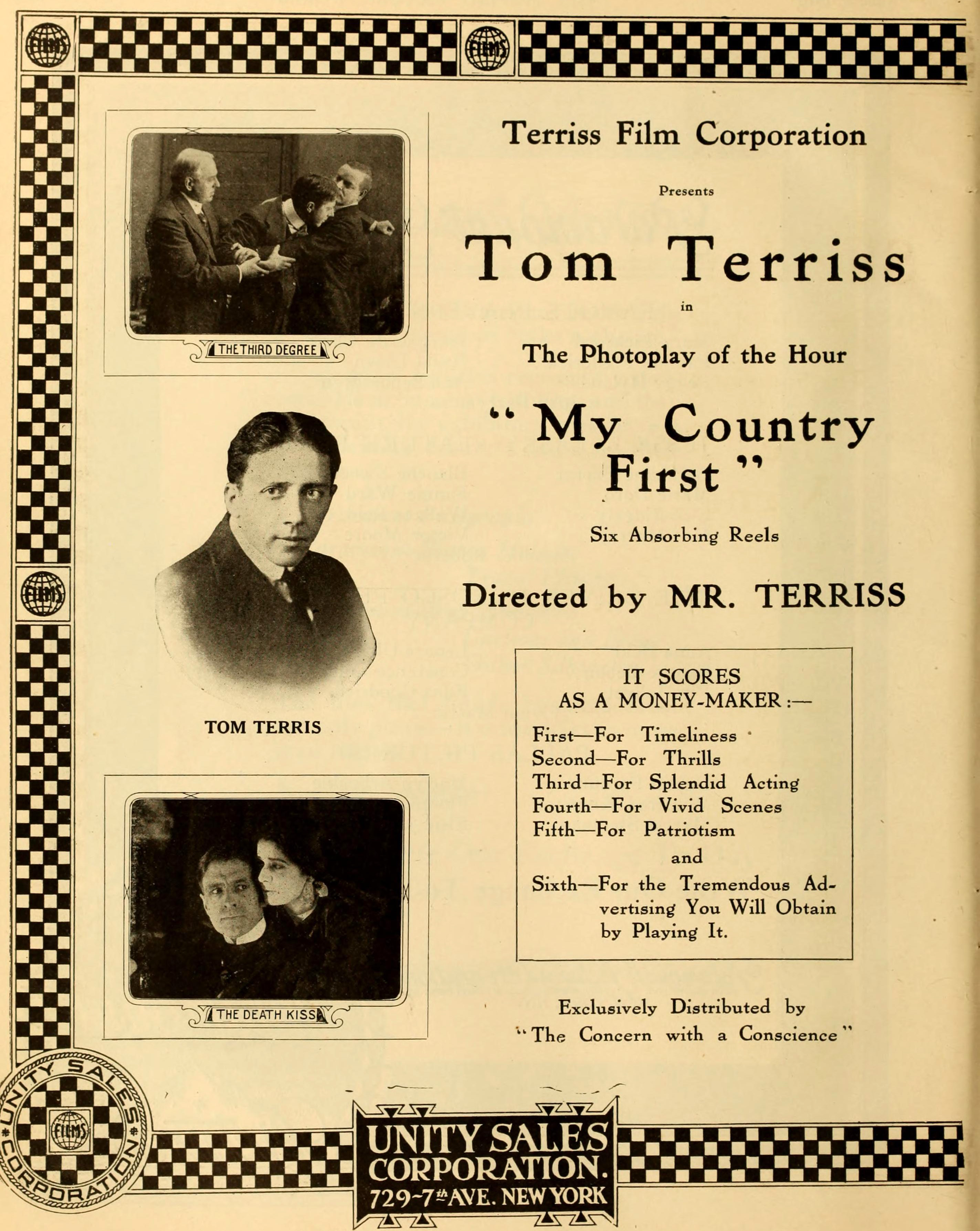
My Country First (1916)

Thomas Herbert F. Lewin (28 September 1872 – 8 February 1964), known professionally as Tom Terriss, was a British actor, screenwriter, and film director. After trying various occupations, he became an actor playing a variety of roles, beginning in 1890, in plays, pantomime and Edwardian musical comedy. After the First World War, he left the stage and pursued a decade-long film career. He was the brother of the musical comedy star Ellaline Terriss and son of leading man actor William Terriss.

== Life and career ==
Terriss was born in Barnes, London, son of the actor William Terriss and his wife Isabel (née Lewis). He was educated at Christ's Hospital, and being, in his own words, "like his father before him … of roving disposition", he tried several occupations before becoming an actor. He was an apprentice at sea, a sheep farmer in Australia, a miner in Colorado, and a clerk on the London Stock Exchange. His sister, Ellaline Terriss, became one of the most famous musical theatre stars of the day.

He made his first appearance on the professional stage at the Globe Theatre in March 1890, as Osric in Hamlet with F.R. Benson's company. In May of the same year he began a three-year association with the Theatre Royal, Drury Lane, playing first in Paul Kauvar and then A Million of Money, The Prodigal Daughter (1892), and three pantomimes.

Over the next decade he played in a range of productions from musical comedies such as The Shop Girl to melodrama including The Colleen Bawn. In 1902 he went to the US, where he remained for four years, appearing in musical comedies under the managements of Charles Frohman and others. He returned to the West End stage in 1906, taking over the role of Mr Beverley in The Beauty of Bath in which his sister Ellaline starred in the title role.

During 1909 Terriss toured in the US and the UK in The Vampire, and in 1910–11 he made another American tour in Scrooge. During 1913–15 he played in Britain in three Dickens adaptations: A Christmas Carol, A Tale of Two Cities, and Nicholas Nickleby. After that he abandoned the stage for a film career, becoming a director for Vitagraph Pictures.

== Filmography ==
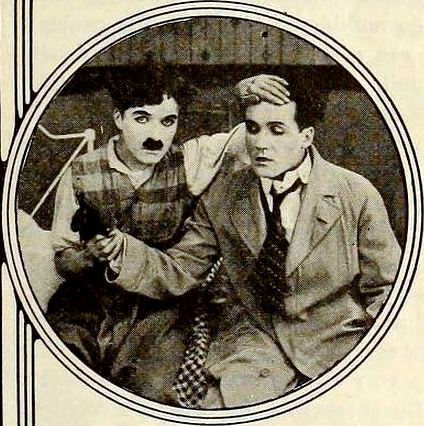
Charlie Chaplin and Tom Terris in Sunnyside (1919)

- The Mystery of Edwin Drood (1914)
- The Fettered Woman (1917)
- The Song of the Soul (1918)
- Everybody's Girl (1918)
- The Woman Between Friends (1918)
- The Captain's Captain (1919)
- The Lion and the Mouse (1919)
- The Cambric Mask (1919)
- The Third Degree (1919)
- The Spark Divine (1919)
- The Tower of Jewels (1919)
- The Vengeance of Durand (1919)
- Sunnyside (1919) (actor, uncredited)
- The Climbers (1919)
- Captain Swift (1920)
- Dead Men Tell No Tales (1920)
- The Fortune Hunter (1920)
- Trumpet Island (1920)
- The Heart of Maryland (1921)
- Boomerang Bill (1922)
- The Challenge (1922)
- Find the Woman (1922)
- The Harbour Lights (1923)
- Fires of Fate (1923)
- The Bandolero (1924)
- The Desert Sheik (1924)
- His Buddy's Wife (1925)
- The Romance of a Million Dollars (1926)
- Temptations of a Shop Girl (1927)
- The Girl from Rio (1927)
- Beyond London Lights (1928)
- Clothes Make the Woman (1928)
- The Naughty Duchess (1928)
- A Princess of Destiny (1929)
- Circumstantial Evidence (1935)
