= Marguerite Bertsch =

American screenwriter and film director (1889–1967)

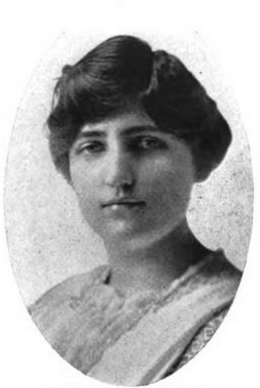
- Marguerite Bertsch, from a 1914 publication
- Born: December 14, 1889; New York City, US
- Died: 1967 (aged 77)
- Occupations: Screenwriter and director

Marguerite Bertsch (December 14, 1889 – 1967) was an American screenwriter and film director who worked in the early days of film. Her 1917 text How to Write for Moving Pictures: A Manual of Instruction and Information reflected and influenced the screenwriters of the era. In the early days of film it was not uncommon for "scenario writers" to be women and she was among those who, beginning in 1916, also directed films. However, she would later be called one of the "forgotten women" of silent film as the non-acting women of early film largely became obscure. Prints of two films that Bertsch had worked on as a screenwriter were rediscovered in the Netherlands, at the Nederlands Filmmuseum. These newly discovered films, The Diver and The Troublesome Step-Daughter, and the 1914 film A Florida Enchantment, are currently the only films from Bertsch's career that have been recovered. The rest are presumed to be lost.

== Career ==
Bertsch began her film career with Vitagraph in 1913, starting as a scenario writer. In 1916, she became the head of the screenwriting department, and began working as a director for the company. Her first directorial output was the 1916 film The Law Decides, which she directed with William P.S. Earle. Several months later, she directed her first solo feature, The Devil's Prize. This was considered to be an unusual film for a woman director and writer, as it was a "tangled tale of illegitimate pregnancy, abandonment, and murder. She also may have worked as an editor and screenwriter for the Famous Players Film Company, but the dates for this work are unknown.

For reasons that are unknown, Bertsch stopped working for the Vitagraph company in 1918, when she was considered to be at the height of her career. There is no record of any film work by her after this point.

== Early life ==
Bertsch was born in New York City, and was educated at Columbia University. She worked as a playwright and a public school teacher before beginning her career as a screenwriter with Vitagraph Studios in 1913.

Very little is known about Bertsch's life outside of her career, but it has been suggested that she was a supporter of the Social Reform movement. In How To Write For Moving Pictures, she argued against writing "anything that might stir up in [the audience] vulgar feelings or sexual thoughts." The film historian Siobhan B. Somerville has argued that Vitagraph's adaptation of the novel A Florida Enchantment, for which Bertsch was the lead screenwriter, reflects this ideology. A number of overtly sexual scenes from the book were cut, as well as scenes dealing with racial issues. This may also be due to the Vitagraph's interest in making "respectable" films. The historian R. Bruce Basell further argues that Bertsch's screenplay for the film shows an opposition to the women's emancipation movement, as it suggests that there will be societal chaos if emancipation is achieved.

There is very little public information about her life between 1918, when she left Vitagraph, and 1967, when she is believed to have died. Census records from the states of New York and New Jersey suggest that between 1930 and 1941, she was living with various family members and may have been working as a freelance writer.

== Screenplay ==
- Mortmain (1915)

=== Writing and Directing ===
- The Law Decides (1916)
- The Devil's Prize (1916)
- The Glory of Yolanda (1917), written by Maibelle Heikes Justice
- The Soul Master (1917)
