= The Single Track =

1921 film

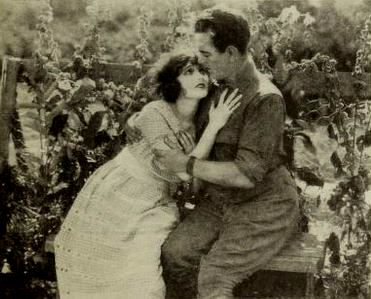
- Still of scene with Corinne Griffith and Richard Travers
- Directed by: Webster Campbell
- Written by: Isabelle Ostrander (as Douglas Grant) (story); C. Graham Baker (scenario); Harry Ditmar (scenario)
- Produced by: Vitagraph Company of America
- Starring: Corinne Griffith
- Cinematography: Charles Davis
- Distributed by: Vitagraph Company of America
- Release date: November 13, 1921
- Running time: 5 reels
- Country: United States
- Language: Silent (English intertitles)

The Single Track is a lost 1921 American silent melodrama film directed by Webster Campbell and starring Corinne Griffith. The film is based upon a story by Isabelle Ostrander writing under the pseudonym Douglas Grant. The film was produced and distributed by Vitagraph.

== Plot ==
As described in a film magazine, when New York City society belle Janette Gildersleeve (Griffith) is informed by her uncle Andrew Geddes (Kent) that her property in Alaska is threatened unless a railroad line is built to other holdings, she promptly closes her town house and, under an assumed name, takes a job as a clerk at the North Star Mining Company's store at Katalak, Alaska. There she encounters civil engineer Barney Hoyt (Travers) who is in charge of building the single track line. Jim Mallison (Betz) attempts to force his attentions on Janette and Barney saves her from further annoyance. The opposition company owning the mine at Unatik attempts to destroy the tracks and a bridge on the day the right-of-way is to expire by floating a raft with dynamite against the bridge. Janette and the family butler, who is posing as her father, destroy the raft and save the bridge. They also rescue Barney who was engaged in a hand-to-hand encounter with Mallison on the trestle.

== Cast ==
- Corinne Griffith as Janette Gildersleeve
- Richard Travers as Barney Hoyt
- Charles Kent as Andrew Geddes
- Sidney Herbert as Peddar
- Jessie Stevens as Man Heaney
- Edward Norton as Roland Winfield
- Matthew Betz as Jim Mallison (credited as Matthew Betts)
- Fuller Mellish as Jud Pettinger
