= John Halifax =

John Halifax may refer to:

- John Halifax, Gentleman, a novel by Dinah Craik, first published in 1856
- John Halifax, Gentleman (TV series), a British drama television series based on the novel
- John Halifax (film), a 1938 British drama film based on the novel
- Johannes de Sacrobosco, also known as John Halifax
