= Man and His Kingdom =

Man and His Kingdom may refer to:

- The Man and His Kingdom, a novel by A.E.W. Mason
- Man and His Kingdom (film), a 1922 film directed by Maurice Elvey, based on the novel
