= John Halifax, Gentleman (1915 film) =

- Directed by: George Pearson
- Written by: Dinah Craik (novel); James L. Pollitt
- Produced by: G. B. Samuelson
- Starring: Fred Paul; Peggy Hyland; Harry Paulo; Lafayette Ranney
- Production company: G.B. Samuelson Productions
- Distributed by: Moss Films
- Release date: 6 September 1915
- Country: United Kingdom
- Languages: Silent; English intertitles

John Halifax, Gentleman is a 1915 British silent drama film directed by George Pearson and starring Fred Paul, Peggy Hyland and Harry Paulo. It is an adaptation of the 1856 novel John Halifax, Gentleman by Dinah Craik.

== Cast ==
- Fred Paul as John Halifax
- Peggy Hyland as Ursula March
- Harry Paulo as Abel Fletcher
- Lafayette Ranney as Phineas Fletcher
- Charles Bennett as John as a Child
- Edna Maude as Ursula as a Child
- Queenie Smith
- Bertram Burleigh

== Bibliography ==
- Low, Rachael. The History of the British Film 1914-1918. Routledge, 2005.
