= Other Men's Daughters =

Other Men's Daughters may refer to:

- Other Men's Daughters (1918 film), an American silent drama film
- Other Men's Daughters (1923 film), an American silent drama film
- Other Men's Daughters (novel), a 1973 novel by Richard G. Stern
