= The Little Lame Prince and his Travelling Cloak =

1875 children's novel by Dinah Craik

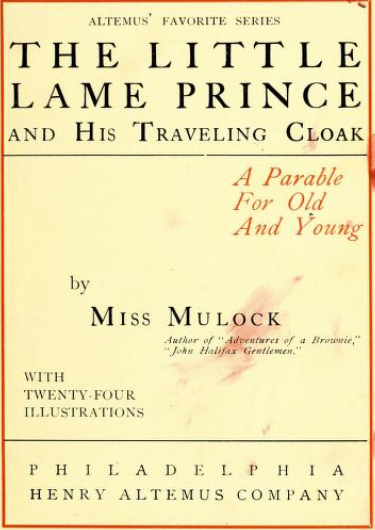
- Title page for The Little Lame Prince and his Travelling Cloak (1900 edition)
- Author: Dinah Maria Mulock Craik (as Miss Mulock)
- Illustrator: F. McL. Ralston in 1st edition; Dorothy Todd in later edition
- Language: English
- Genre: children's fiction
- Published: 1875 Daldy Isbister and Co. London
- Publication place: UK
- Media type: Print
- Pages: 169 in 1st edition

The Little Lame Prince and his Travelling Cloak (often published under its shorter title The Little Lame Prince) is a story for children written by Dinah Maria Mulock Craik and first published in 1875. In the story, the young Prince Dolor, whose legs are paralysed due to a childhood trauma, is exiled to a tower in a wasteland. As he grows older, a fairy godmother provides a magical travelling cloak so he can see, but not touch, the world. He uses this cloak to go on various adventures and develops great wisdom and empathy in the process. Finally, he becomes a wise and compassionate ruler of his own land.

The author's style was to stimulate positive feelings in her young readers so that they would be motivated to adopt socially correct actions in whatever circumstances they encountered. She shows how imagination (mediated by the cloak) can lead to empathy and enlightened morality. However, some critics have found a deeper theme in this story, relating to the restricted lives of respectable middle-class British Victorian women that enforced helplessness.

== Plot ==
On the day of Prince Dolor's baptism, there was a great procession. His well-to-do nurse was fiddling with her dress while holding the Prince, causing her to drop him, damaging his spine. The baby grew pale and seemed a little ill, but not enough to cause concern, and the nurse told no one that she had dropped him. A fairy godmother appears to the Nurse and reveals she knows what happened. She also reveals that the queen, Dolorez, has just died, lying alone in her chambers. She christens the boy "Dolor" to honor the queen, who she claimed was a close friend.

Dolor's legs never grow strong. He cannot walk; he can only crawl with his arms. The king worries for his son, but he is still grieving for the queen, and eventually dies. The large Regent family moves into the castle and the Prince's Uncle rules the kingdom as the new king. Things are good throughout the land, but Prince Dolor is ignored. One day, the king announces that Dolor has died and a funeral is held.

In reality, the King has commanded an African or Arab knight, who is deaf and mute, and a nurse to take Dolor away to live in Hopeless Tower in the middle of a wasteland. The tower is tall and inescapable to Dolor and his nurse, and the only way in is by a foldable ladder that the knight provides. He brings Dolor many books, toys, maps, and food for the nurse to prepare. The Black Knight visits once a month. The Prince likes to be quiet and look out the window at the lonely plains, doing his lessons and schoolwork usually without complaining, as he loves books. He slowly learns of the kingdom of Nomansland, which he does not know is his own kingdom, as the nurse is forbidden under threat of death to tell him anything about himself. Dolor feels that to read of things and never see them is sad. In loneliness, he wishes that he could fly, see the world, and feel someone's kindness.

His godmother then appeared, saying that he had finally wished for her. She offers to grant his wishes, but she can't bring him a playmate, so instead gives him a tattered, green, poncho-like traveling cloak. She then disappears, leaving him to wonder about the purpose of such a shabby cloak.

For many days, he almost forgot about his godmother, until he fell ill. Upon her visit, they discuss his crippled state, and she teaches him how to use the magical traveling cloak. When he said the magic words, it grew bigger, and he used it to fly out of the tower's skylight. As he had never been outside, flying around the tower was wonderful, but he saw only dreary plains, the stars and moon. Growing cold and frightened as the cloak took him faster and faster away from the tower, he calls out for his fairy godmother to remind him of the magic words to bring him home. A voice tells him the words and he returns safely. He puts the cloak away and it shrinks and bundles itself up. The nurse didn't know he was gone, but is cross with him for leaving the skylight open and allowing the freezing air in. Dolor went to sleep in excited anticipation of flying again tomorrow.

The next day, he did his lessons and schoolwork quickly and went out on the cloak again. He saw a waterfall, all kinds of flowers and trees and grass, birds and small animals. He wished he could see better, and his godmother sent him a pair of spectacles that could discern details even from great heights.

He plays with his toys the next day and thinks about his toy horse and wishes he had a real horse. That night when he went out, he brought with him some food and water and a coat and he flew for a long time. He fell asleep while flying. When he awoke he was no longer in the wasteland. He was in the countryside. He saw rivers and hills, animals, trees, and even a waterfall. He wished he could hear everything better and his godmother sent him some silver ears that fit over his own. He wondered if he would see any people. He wished so much to have a little boy to play with. His flying cloak dipped lower and brought him closer to see a boy running in the field with his horse. As he watched, the little prince cried because he knew that he himself would never be able to run that way. Then a lark flew into his lap and he was happy again because this was such a strange and wonderful thing.

He wondered about his mother and father. He wondered what happened to them. The lark stayed with him and lived right outside his skylight. He decided after seeing the running boy that he didn't want to fly around any more because it made him sad. A few months later he wondered if he will ever be the king as princes are supposed to. His nurse wrote on a paper "You ARE a king” and she finally wrote out his whole history for him. She was afraid to speak in case a spy heard her break the rule about not telling him.

That night he used the cloak and asked it to show him not what he wanted to see but “what I SHOULD see.” The flying cloak took him to see the big city of Nomansland. A magpie came to fly next to him and spoke to him with a strangely familiar voice. The magpie shows him the palace – the biggest building he ever saw and showed him the regent King, his uncle – who had just died and was lying there looking like a wax figure. The bird showed him that the town was beginning to revolt. There was a revolution going on. He saw terrible fighting in the streets. He didn't want to see any more and he went home to his tower to sleep. When he woke up re realised his nurse was gone. He sees hoof prints outside his tower. He realises that the Black Knight came and got the nurse and took her away. He is alone in the tower for many days.

He almost runs out of food and is very sad and lonely when one morning he hears a trumpet. A huge parade of people from the city had come to his tower. They were singing and celebrating for they had heard that he was alive. The nurse and the Black Knight rode to the city to tell them about Prince Dolor. He was crowned the new king. He rules the city for many years. When he gets old, he tells the people of the kingdom that he will leave and never come back. He gets on his cloak (which no one ever saw before) and flies away.

== Publication history ==
The novel was first published in 1875 in the UK by Daldy Isbister and Co., 56 Ludgate Hill, London. Printed by Virtue and Co., City Road, London. The first edition had a frontis piece and 23 engraved illustrations and was a hardback bound in green cloth, decorated in gilt and black with illustrations on the front and spine. All edges were gilded. Its publication followed Craik's popular novel John Halifax, Gentleman and this was stated on the cover. It has remained in publication since, with multiple editions.

== Criticism ==
"I do not wholly approve Miss Mulloch's famous story of the 'Little Lame Prince,'" wrote L. Frank Baum in his essay, "Modern Fairy Tales," "for although it is charmingly written it is too pitiful in sentiment. Doubtless many crippled children have derived a degree of comfort from the adventures of the little lame prince and his magic cloak; but a normal child should not be harassed with pitiful subjects, and even the maimed ones prefer to idolize the well and strong."

== Explanation of the novel's title ==
The full title of the first edition is The Little Lame Prince and His Travelling Cloak – A Parable for Young and Old.
