= Fred LeRoy Granville =

Cinematographer and director

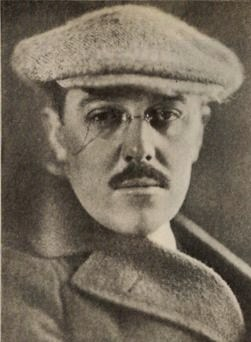
- Fred LeRoy Granville in 1920
- Born: 8 May 1896; Warrnambool, Victoria, Australia
- Died: 14 November 1932 (aged 46)
- Occupations: Cinematographer, Director
- Title: A.S.C. Founding Member
- Spouses: Mary J. (Mayme) Paynter; Peggy Hyland (divorced)
- Children: 2

Fred LeRoy Granville was born in Warrnambool, Victoria, Australia, in 1896, and educated in New Zealand. The 1 February 1922, issue of American Cinematographer stated that he was "a bloody Britisher by birth" and "first saw the light at Worton Hall, Isleworth, Middlesex, England." Granville became interested in photography as a boy. His first experience with cinematography came in 1913 under the guidance of James Crosby at the Selig Polyscope studio in Edendale, near downtown Los Angeles. Granville photographed the documentary Rescue of the Stefansson Expedition (1914) and a number of features and serials for Universal, including Liberty, A Daughter of the USA (1916) and The Heart of Humanity (1918). He also shot several of cowboy actor Tom Mix's early Fox features. The last two films he directed were produced in France.

While married to Mary J., he had two sons, George E., born about 1908 and Roy F., born about 1911.

In 1920, Granville went to England, where he worked as a cinematographer and director into the mid-1920s. Here he met and married the actress Peggy Hyland in 1923. The marriage was later dissolved. He died in London on 14 November 1932, from complications related to Bright's disease.

== Selected filmography ==
- Liberty, A Daughter of the USA (1916)
- Money Madness (1917)
- The Bride's Awakening (1918)
- The Heart of Humanity (1918)
- Her Body in Bond (1918)
- Rough Riding Romance (1919)
- The Coming of the Law (1919)
- The Honeypot (1920)
- The Price of Silence (1920) a.k.a. At the Mercy of Tiberius
- Once to Every Woman (1920 film)
- Love Maggy (1921)
- The Smart Sex (1921)
- The Shark Master (1921)
- The Fighting Lover (1921)
- Shifting Sands (1922)
- The Beloved Vagabond (1923)
- The Sins Ye Do (1924)
- Forbidden Cargoes (1926)
- Lady Harrington (1926)
