= The Teeth of the Tiger (film) =

1919 film by Chester Withey

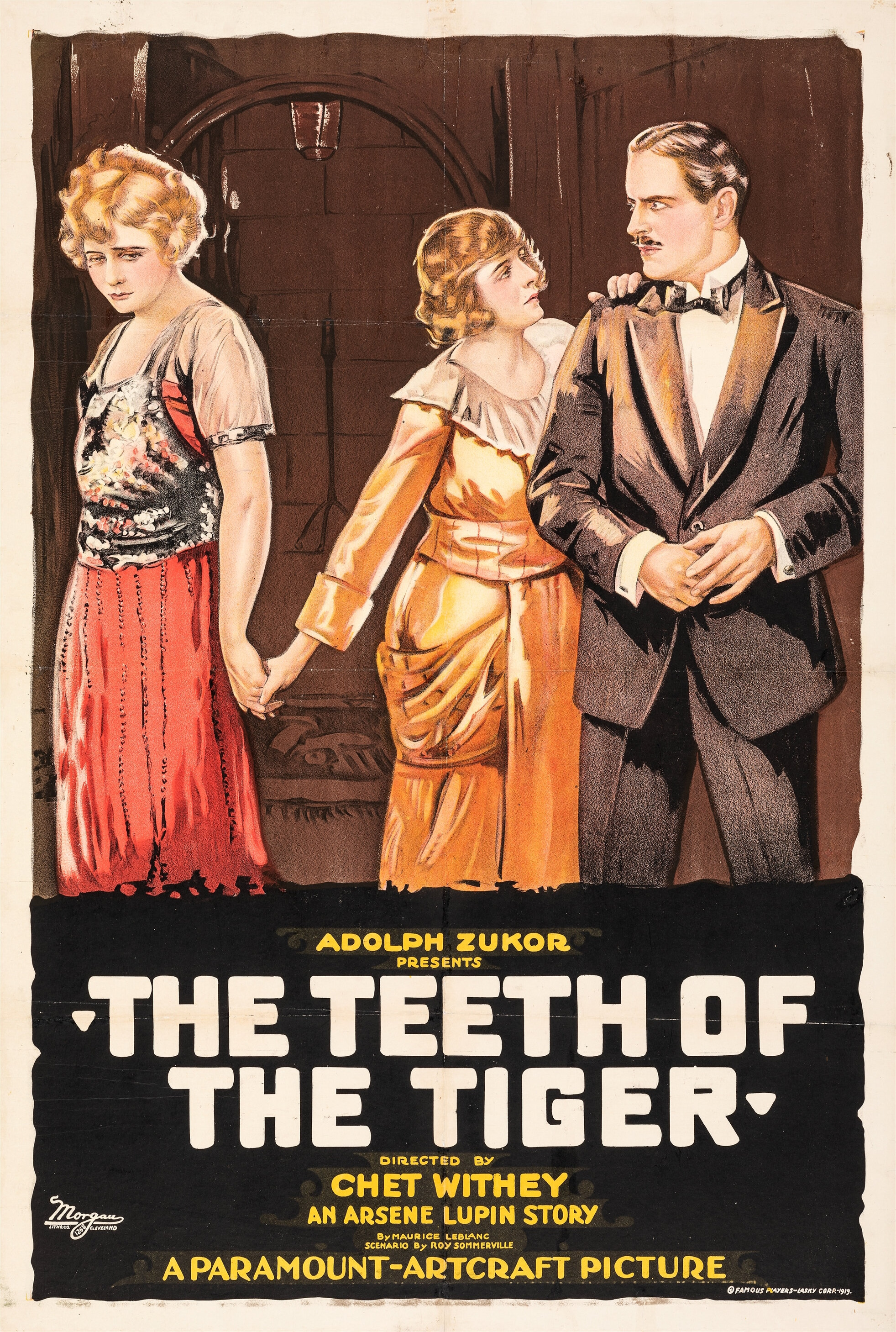
- Theatrical release poster
- Directed by: Chester Withey
- Screenplay by: Roy Somerville
- Based on: The Teeth of the Tiger by Maurice Leblanc
- Produced by: Adolph Zukor
- Starring: David Powell; Marguerite Courtot; Templar Saxe; Myrtle Stedman; Joseph Herbert; Charles L. MacDonald; Riley Hatch
- Cinematography: Al Liguori
- Production company: Famous Players–Lasky Corporation
- Distributed by: Paramount Pictures
- Release date: November 2, 1919
- Running time: 60 minutes
- Country: United States
- Language: Silent (English intertitles)

The Teeth of the Tiger is a 1919 American silent comedy film directed by Chester Withey and written by Roy Somerville based upon a novel of the same name by Maurice Leblanc. The film stars David Powell, Marguerite Courtot, Templar Saxe, Myrtle Stedman, Joseph Herbert, Charles L. MacDonald, and Riley Hatch. The film was released on November 2, 1919, by Paramount Pictures.

== Plot ==
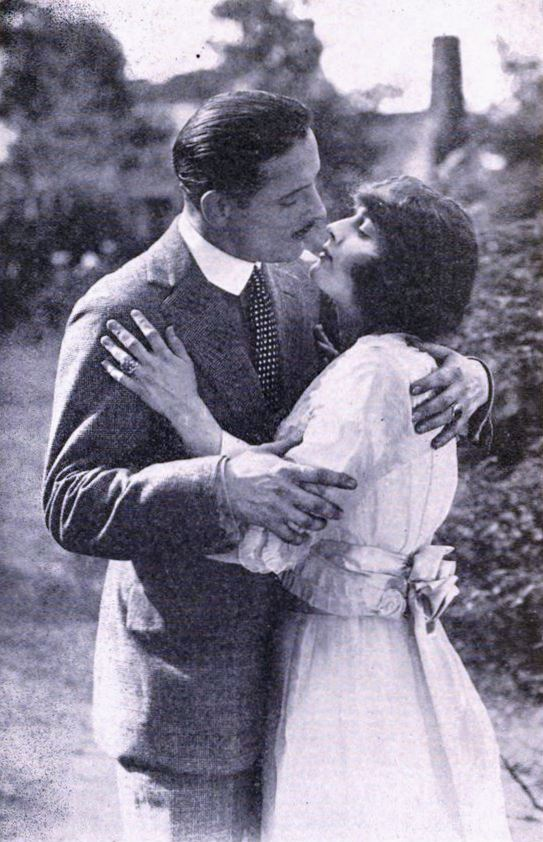
Still with David Powell and Marguerite Courtot

Living quietly under the assumed name Paul Sernine, reformed gentleman crook Arsene Lupin is summoned to protect his invalid, wealthy friend Henry Forbes. Despite the watchfulness of Paul and Alexandre Mazeroux, a fellow criminal turned detective, Forbes is murdered. French detective Jabot and the New York detective force have many suspects including Paul, Marie Forbes, the dead man's widow who is suspected on the basis of an apple found with an imprint of her teeth on it, Gordon Savage, her lover, and Florence Chandler, Forbes' secretary and beneficiary under his will. After a series of traps, false arrests, chases through secret passageways, and an escape from handcuffs, Paul deduces that the true criminal is Doctor Varney, who cared for Forbes. Paul prevents Varney from blowing up the house, and at the same time wins the affections of Florence.

== Cast ==
- David Powell as Paul Sernine / Arsène Lupin
- Marguerite Courtot as Florence Chandler
- Templar Saxe as Antoine Jabot
- Myrtle Stedman as Marie Forbes
- Joseph Herbert as Henry Forbes
- Charles L. MacDonald as Chief Harvey Williams
- Riley Hatch as Alexandre Mazeroux
- Charles K. Gerrard as Gordon Savage
- Frederick Burton as Doctor Varney

== Production ==
Anna Lehr was to play the role of Florence Chandler but was replaced by Courtot during production after she became ill.

== Preservation ==
It is unknown whether the film survives as none of copies were able to locate, likely presumed lost.
