= Marguerite Florence Laura Jarvis =

British writer, screenwriter, and actress (1886–1964)

- Born: Marguerite Florence Laura Jarvis; 7 October 1886; Hinzada, Burma, British India
- Died: 10 March 1964 (aged 77); Sheffield, Yorkshire, England
- Other names: Countess Barcynska; Barcynska Hélène; Marguerite Florence Barclay; Mrs. Armiger Barczinsky; Caradoc Evans Marguerite; Marguerite Evans; Marguerite Jervis; Armiger Barclay; Marguerite Barclay; Oliver Sandys
- Occupations: Author, screenwriter, actress
- Years active: 1911–64
- Known for: The Pleasure Garden, The Miracle Stone of Wales (1957)
- Spouse(s): Armiger Barczinsky; Caradoc Evans (1933–1945, his death)
- Children: 1

Marguerite Florence Laura Jarvis, also known under the pseudonym of Oliver Sandys (7 October 1886 – 10 March 1964) was a British writer, screenwriter, and actress. She used several other names and aliases, such as Countess Barcynska, Hélène Barcynska, Marguerite Florence Barclay, Mrs. Armiger Barczinsky, Caradoc Evans Marguerite, Marguerite Evans, Armiger Barclay, and Marguerite Barclay.

== Biography ==
Daughter of an officer of the Indian Medical Corps, Marguerite was born in Henzada, Burma, then part of British India. She was educated and trained as an actress in England.

She married in 1911 the Polish-born journalist Armiger Barczinsky, also known as Barclay (1861?-1930), who greatly encouraged her to write, and had a son, Nicholas Barczinsky-Sandys (born 1916). It was following the birth and the success of her stage novel, The Honeypot, published in 1916, that she separated from Barczinsky-Barclay, by whose death she was widowed in 1930. In 1929 she met the Welsh writer Caradoc Evans (1878–1945) in London, and married him on 22 March 1933, a union that lasted until his death in 1945. Living together in Aberystwyth from their marriage, then at Ruislip, Middlesex from 1937, Marguerite and Caradoc were involved in theatrical ventures, both in Wales and England.

After the outbreak of the Second World War in 1939, they returned to Aberystwyth, and eventually settled in 1940 in New Cross, Cardiganshire, about five miles from Aberystwyth, where Caradoc remained with his son until 1945. In the 1940s, Marguerite wrote two autobiographical works, published by the publisher Hurst and Blackett. The first, Full and Frank: the Private Life of the Woman Novelist (1941), is a presentation of the author's life to the public. The second is a biography of Caradoc. The house they lived in, "Brynawelon" had spectacular views of Plynlimon, which may have inspired her book The Miracle Stone of Wales (1957). Caradoc Evans is buried in the New Cross Horeb chapel cemetery.

After the death of Caradoc, Marguerite returned to London briefly, and then went to Penrhyn-coch, then to Panteidal Lodge, with Captain Hewitt, which she describes in her book The Miracle Stone of Wales. In the 1950s she came to live at "The Ancient House" in Little Stretton, Shropshire and used nearby Church Stretton as the setting for one of her later novels, Quaint Place (1952). By that decade the market for her kind of fiction had collapsed and she was surviving on a pension for literary services.

On 10 March 1964 Marguerite died of heart failure in Shrewsbury Hospital. She was buried in her second husband's grave at New Cross Horeb chapel cemetery.

== Literary career ==
Marguerite was a prolific author during the twentieth century, and achieved success before and after the First World War. Her autobiography, published in 1941, lists 38 novels which she wrote as Oliver Sandys, including six films, and 21 she wrote as Countess Barcynska, five of them also filmed. The total number of her works exceed 130, between 1911 and 1946, but libraries do not have all the catalogued works. She had also published short stories, memoirs (one on mysticism and faith healing), and a biography of her second husband, Caradoc Evans.

The summer of 1911 marks the date of the first novel by Marguerite, signed as Oliver Sandys, The Woman in the Firelight, concluded a few weeks after the wedding. Her first successful novel, however, was The Honeypot (1916), inspired by her experiences as an actress; it was adapted to film in 1920. Nine more of her novels were adapted to film between 1922 and 1933, notably The Pleasure Garden (1925), debut film of director Alfred Hitchcock. In the mid-1920s, she was considered a best-seller, earning £1,000 a year for book sales and movie rights.

In May 1928, as Oliver Sandys, she published another novel, Vista, the Dancer dedicated to Kitty Cunningham, "for their loyalty and devotion."

In 1957, Marguerite wrote a small book under the pseudonym Oliver Sandys, titled The Miracle Stone of Wales. The publisher, Rider & Son, was a pioneer in publishing matters of the occult. According to Marguerite Evans, she had been given a stone by a Dyn Hysbys (cunning folk) called "Old Griff", who lived in Plynlimon.

In early July 1964 her posthumous novel, as Oliver Sandys, Madame Adastra published, set largely in the world of hospitals and nursing.

== Partial list of works ==
=== Literary ===
- Letters from Fleet Street (1910) (novel) (Marguerite Barclay)
- The Woman in the Firelight (1911)
- The Honeypot (1916) (novel) (Countess Barcynska)
- Rose o' the Sea (1920) (novel) (Countess Barcynska)
- The Green Caravan (1922) (novel)
- The Pleasure Garden (1923) (novel) (Oliver Sandys)
- Vista, the Dancer (1928) (Oliver Sandys)
- Mops (1928)
- Spangles (1934) (novel) (Oliver Sandys)
- Unbroken Thread (1946)
- Quaint Place (1952)
- Suffer to Sing (1955)
- Miss Venus of Aberdovey (1956) (novel) (Countess Barcynska)
- The Miracle Stone of Wales (1957) (Oliver Sandys)
- Madame Adastra (1964) - posthumous (Oliver Sandys)
- Tesha (short story) (Countess Barcynska)
- Chappy - That's All (novel)
- Shine My Wings

=== Stories adapted for cinema ===
- The Honeypot (1920)
- Love Maggy (1921) (novel) (Countess Barcynska)
- The Green Caravan (1922)
- Rose o' the Sea (1922)
- Chappy—That's All (1924)
- We Women (1925) (novel) (Countess Barcynska)
- The Pleasure Garden (1925), adapted by Alfred Hitchcock
- Blinkeyes (1926) (screenplay)
- Tesha (1928), adaptation of Tesha
- Born Lucky (1933), adaptation of Mops

=== Performance ===
- Stage Struck (1925) (Hilda Wagner)
