= Chester Withey =

American film director

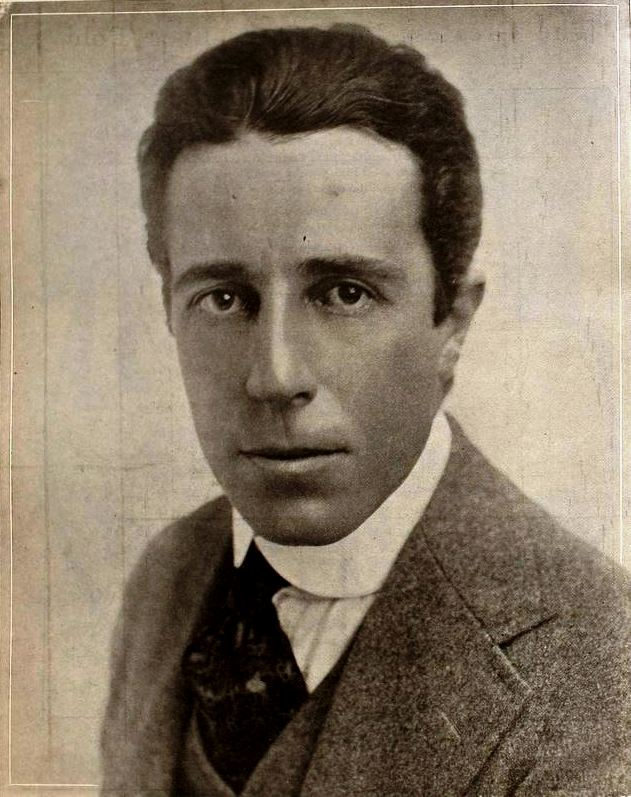
- Withey in 1920
- Born: November 8, 1887; Park City, Utah
- Died: October 6, 1939 (aged 51); California
- Occupation(s): Actor, film director and screenwriter
- Years active: 1913–1928
- Parents: Chester Henry Withey (father); Mary E. Kelso (mother)

Chester "Chet" Withey (8 November 1887, Park City, Utah – 6 October 1939, California) was an American silent film actor, director, and screenwriter. He participated in the production in total of some 100 films.

Born in Park City, Utah, the son of Chester Henry Withey and Mary E. Kelso, Withey started his career in silent film as an actor in 1913. He starred in films such as the 1916 film The Wharf Rat. He married Virginia Philley, a screenwriter, who also did some acting.

However, by 1916, he had already directed several films and decided to concentrate on work behind the camera. Withey was also accredited with writing for 15 films.

He retired from film directing in 1928 and died 6 October 1939.

== Partial filmography ==
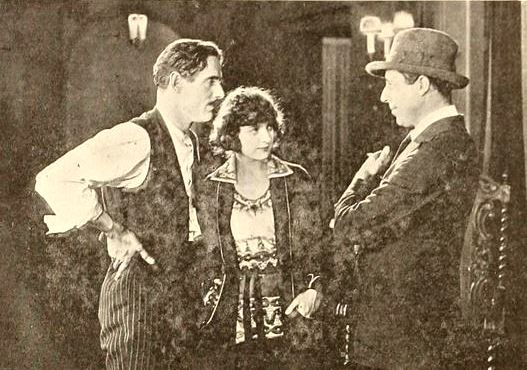
Director Chester "Chet" Whitney discussing a scene with David Powell and Marguerite Courtot for The Teeth of the Tiger (1919)

Films in which Withey had an acting, writing or directing role include:

- The Flirt and the Bandit (1913)
- The Geisha (1914)
- The Oubliette (1914)
- The Higher Law (1914)
- The Devil's Needle (1916 - directed)
- Sunshine Dad (1916 - actor, story and scenario)
- The Old Folks at Home (1916)
- The Wharf Rat (1916)
- An Alabaster Box (1917)
- A Woman's Awakening (1917)
- The Bad Boy (1917 - directed)
- Madame Bo-Peep (1917 - directed)
- Nearly Married (1917 - directed)
- On the Quiet (1918 - directed)
- In Pursuit of Polly (1918 - directed)
- Maggie Pepper (1919 - directed)
- The New Moon (1919 - directed)
- The Teeth of the Tiger (1919 - directed)
- She Loves and Lies (1920 - directed)
- Romance (1920 - directed)
- Wedding Bells (1921 - directed)
- Coincidence (1921 - directed)
- Lessons in Love (1921 - directed)
- Outcast (1922)
- Domestic Relations (1922)
- Heroes and Husbands (1922)
- Richard the Lion-Hearted (1923 - directed)
- A Cafe in Cairo (1924) - (directed)
- Her Honor, the Governor (1926 - directed)
- Going the Limit (1926 - directed)
- The Jade Cup (1926 - co-writer)
- The Impostor (1926 - directed)
- Queen o'Diamonds (1926 - directed)
- The Bushranger (1928 - directed)
