= The Pleasure Garden (1925 film) =

1926 film by Alfred Hitchcock

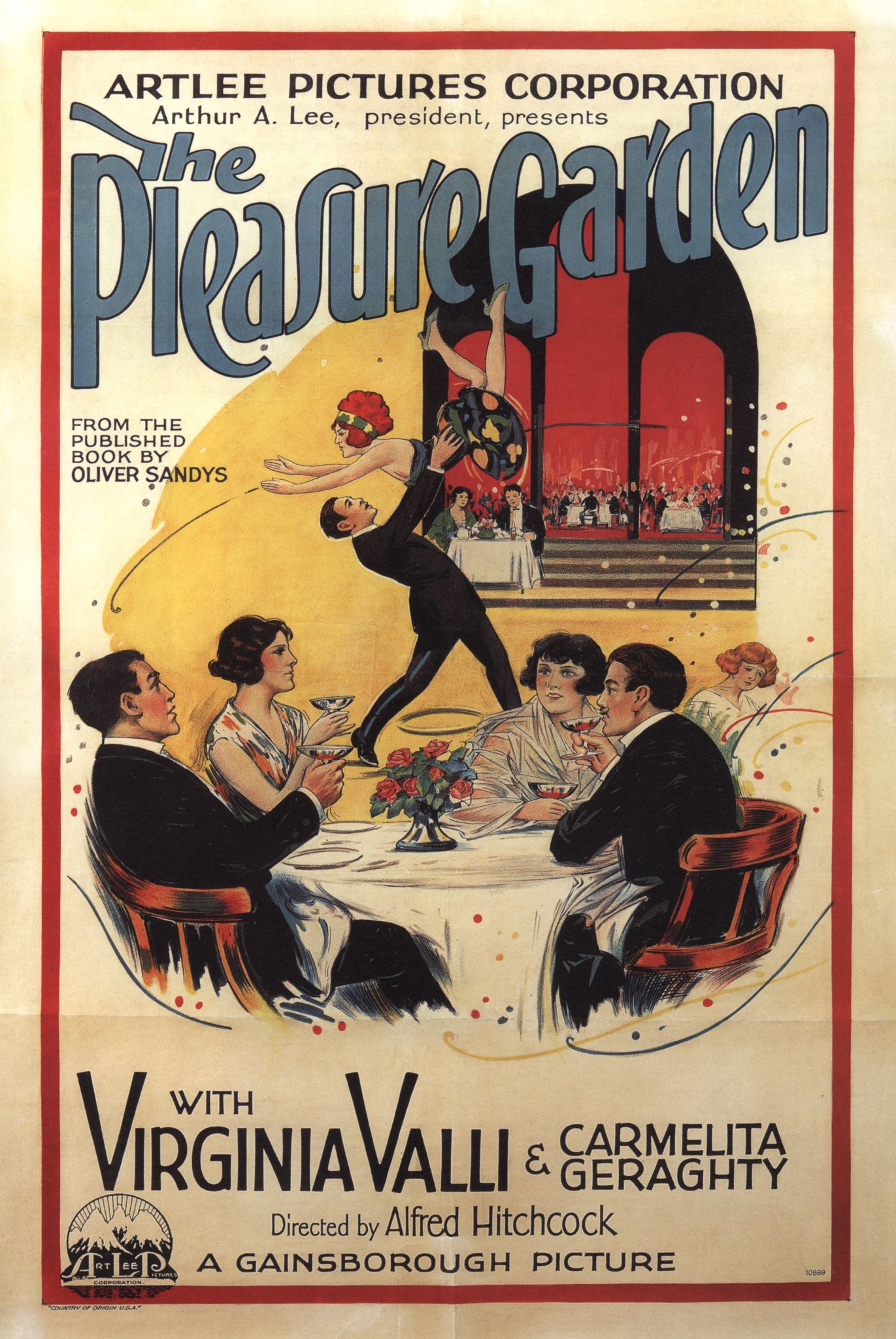
- American theatrical release poster
- Directed by: Alfred Hitchcock
- Screenplay by: Eliot Stannard
- Based on: The Pleasure Garden by Oliver Sandys
- Produced by: Michael Balcon; Erich Pommer
- Starring: Virginia Valli; Carmelita Geraghty
- Cinematography: Gaetano di Ventimiglia
- Music by: Lee Erwin
- Production companies: Bavaria Film; Gainsborough Pictures
- Distributed by: Woolf & Freedman Film Service (UK)
- Release dates: 8 January 1926 (Berlin); 12 April 1926 (UK)
- Running time: 90 minutes (2012 restoration)
- Countries: United Kingdom; Germany
- Language: Silent (English intertitles)

The Pleasure Garden is a 1926 silent drama film directed by Alfred Hitchcock in his feature film directorial debut. Based on the 1923 novel by Oliver Sandys, The Pleasure Garden is about two chorus girls, played by Virginia Valli and Carmelita Geraghty, at the Pleasure Garden Theatre in London and their troubled relationships. An international co-production of the United Kingdom and Germany, the film premiered in Berlin on 8 January 1926 (as Irrgarten der Leidenschaft).

== Plot ==
Jill, a young dancer, arrives in London with a letter of introduction to Mr. Hamilton, proprietor of the Pleasure Garden Theatre. The letter and all her money are stolen from her handbag as she waits to see him. Patsy, a chorus girl at the Pleasure Garden, sees her difficulty and offers to take her to her own lodgings and to try to get her a job. Next morning Jill is successful in getting a part in the show. Her fiancé, Hugh, arrives with a colleague called Levet. Hugh and Patsy become very close while Jill is being pursued by a number of rich men, eventually breaking up with Hugh in order to begin a relationship with the wealthy Prince Ivan. Not long after this, Hugh is sent to Africa by his company.

Jill moves out of the lodgings she shares with Patsy and becomes more involved with the Prince. As she becomes more successful and used to the rich and famous lifestyle she also becomes more dismissive of Patsy, shunning her and eventually seeing her as a commoner. As Patsy laments the loss of her friend, she is comforted by Levet who convinces her to enter into marriage with him. The couple honeymoon in Italy before he leaves to join Hugh in Africa. After some time Patsy finally receives a letter from her husband in which he says he has been sick for weeks. Patsy is determined to go to take care of him and asks Jill to lend her the fare. Jill refuses as she is preparing for her marriage to the Prince and has no money to spare. Patsy is able to borrow the fare from her landlords Mr and Mrs Sidey. When she arrives at her husband's bungalow, she finds that he is having an affair with a local woman and leaves. Levet tries to drive the woman away but when she refuses to leave him, follows her into the sea and drowns her.

Meanwhile, Patsy has found that Hugh really is very ill with a fever and stays to take care of him. Hugh has since discovered from a newspaper that Jill is to marry the Prince and he and Patsy soon realize that they love each other. Levet finds them together and accuses Hugh of making advances to his wife. Patsy agrees to follow Levet back to his bungalow in order to save Hugh. During the night, Levet is stricken with guilt and paranoia over the murder of his mistress and begins seeing ghostly visions of her. Levet becomes convinced that the ghost of his mistress will not stop haunting him until he murders Patsy too. Levet corners Patsy with a sword but he is shot dead before he can kill her. Hugh and Patsy find consolation with each other and return to London.

== Cast ==
- Virginia Valli as Patsy Brand
- Carmelita Geraghty as Jill Cheyne
- Miles Mander as Levet
- John Stuart as Hugh Fielding
- Ferdinand Martini as Mr. Sidey
- Florence Helminger as Mrs. Sidey
- Georg H. Schnell as Oscar Hamilton
- Karl Falkenberg as Prince Ivan
- Elizabeth Pappritz as Native Girl (uncredited)
- Louis Brody as Plantation Manager (uncredited)

== Production ==
Hitchcock described the casting process thus:

Michael Balcon, who had conceived the idea of "importing" American stars long before anybody else, had engaged Virginia Valli for the leading role. She was at the height of her career then – glamorous, famous, and very popular. That she was coming to Europe to make a picture at all was something of an event.

Producer Michael Balcon allowed Hitchcock to direct the film when Graham Cutts, a jealous executive at Gainsborough Pictures, refused to let Hitchcock work on The Rat. The film was shot in 1925 in Italy (Alassio, Genoa, and Lake Como) and Germany. Many misfortunes befell the cast and crew. When Gaetano Ventimiglia, the film's cinematographer, failed to declare the film stock to Italian customs officials, the team had to pay fines and buy new film, seriously depleting their budget.

== Release ==
C. M. Woolf, the head of the Gainsborough film distribution company, found The Pleasure Garden to be insufficiently commercial and too "European" to be released, which led to the film not being shown in England initially. The Pleasure Garden premiered on 8 January 1926 in Berlin, Germany. After it was shown briefly in London in April 1926, The Pleasure Garden was not officially released in the UK until January 1927, just before Hitchcock's third film, The Lodger: A Story of the London Fog, became a hit in February 1927.

== Reception ==
A review in an American film magazine called The Pleasure Garden a "sex picture wholely unsuitable for the exhibitor who aims to show good clean entertainment" with "many highly objectionable scenes", making it "not a picture to entertain American audiences".

== Preservation status and home media ==
In June 2012, The Pleasure Garden and eight other silent Hitchcock films were restored by the British Film Institute. As a result, 20 minutes of missing footage was added to this film, including "the atmospheric color tinting of the period". A new score was commissioned for the restoration by young British composer Daniel Patrick Cohen and it has been performed live with the film many times around the world. Due to a lack of funds to properly record the score, it has not been released on home video. Australian label Imprint announced the film's Blu-ray release within The Hitchcock Nine collector set, accompanied with a new piano score by Neil Brand and an alternative organ score by Lee Erwin, released in September 2025.

The only official DVD release contains a poor quality edited version of the film by US collector Raymond Rohauer. In 2021, The Pleasure Garden became the first Hitchcock film to enter the public domain in the United States.

== Significance ==
According to critic Dave Kehr, The Pleasure Garden's opening scene stands like a virtual "clip reel of Hitchcock motifs to come". The first shot captures chorus girls descending a spiral staircase (see Vertigo); a man uses opera glasses to better appreciate a blonde chorus dancer (see Rear Window); and the same blonde, who at first appears erotically remote, later emerges as down-to-earth and approachable (see Family Plot).
