= The Highbinders (1926 film) =

1926 film

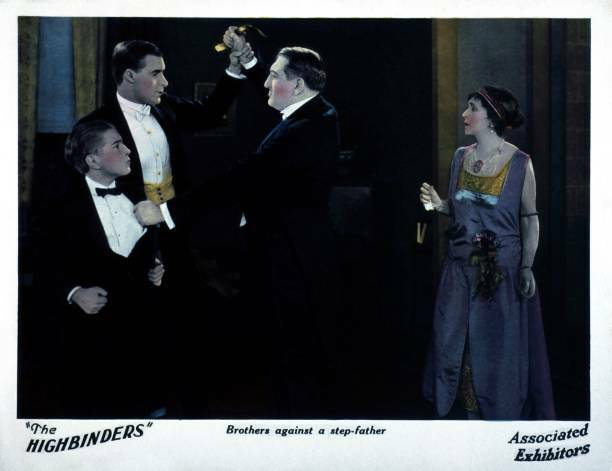
- Directed by: George Terwilliger
- Written by: Calder Johnstone; William T. Tilden
- Starring: Marjorie Daw; Ben Alexander; George Hackathorne
- Cinematography: Walter Blakeley
- Production company: Worthy Pictures
- Distributed by: Associated Exhibitors
- Release date: March 21, 1926
- Running time: 50 minutes
- Country: United States
- Language: Silent (English intertitles)

The Highbinders is a 1926 American silent drama film directed by George Terwilliger and starring Marjorie Daw, Ben Alexander, and George Hackathorne.

== Cast ==
- William T. Tilden as David Marshall
- Marjorie Daw as Hope Masterson
- Ben Alexander as Roy Marshall
- George Hackathorne as Humpty Dugan
- Edmund Breese as Mike Harrigan
- Walter Long as Bill Dorgan
- George F. Marion as Wadsworth Ladd
- Effie Shannon as Mrs. James Cortright
- Hugh Thompson as Arnold Blair
- Tammany Young as Stump Rogers
- Hattie Delaro as Mrs. Briggs
- Kathleen Martyn as Alice Van Slake

== Bibliography ==
- Munden, Kenneth White. The American Film Institute Catalog of Motion Pictures Produced in the United States, Part 1. University of California Press, 1997.
