= Valia Venitshaya =

British actress (1899–1993)

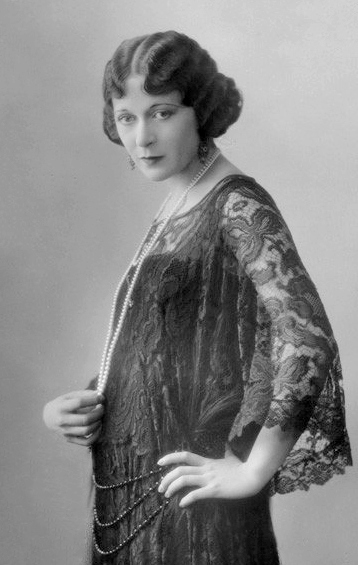
Valia in 1921

Valia Venitshaya (19 December 1899 in Whitechapel, London, England 26 June 1993 in San Jose, California) was a British actress of the silent era.

== Selected filmography ==
- Man and His Kingdom (1922)
- Little Brother of God (1922)
- The Green Caravan (1922)
- The Passionate Friends (1922)
- The Audacious Mr. Squire (1923)
- In the Blood (1923)
- Shifting Sands (1923)
- The Woman Who Obeyed (1923)
- The Starlit Garden (1923)
- A Gamble with Hearts (1923)
- Sally Bishop (1924)
- The Great Prince Shan (1924)
