= The Sixteenth Wife =

1917 film by Charles Brabin

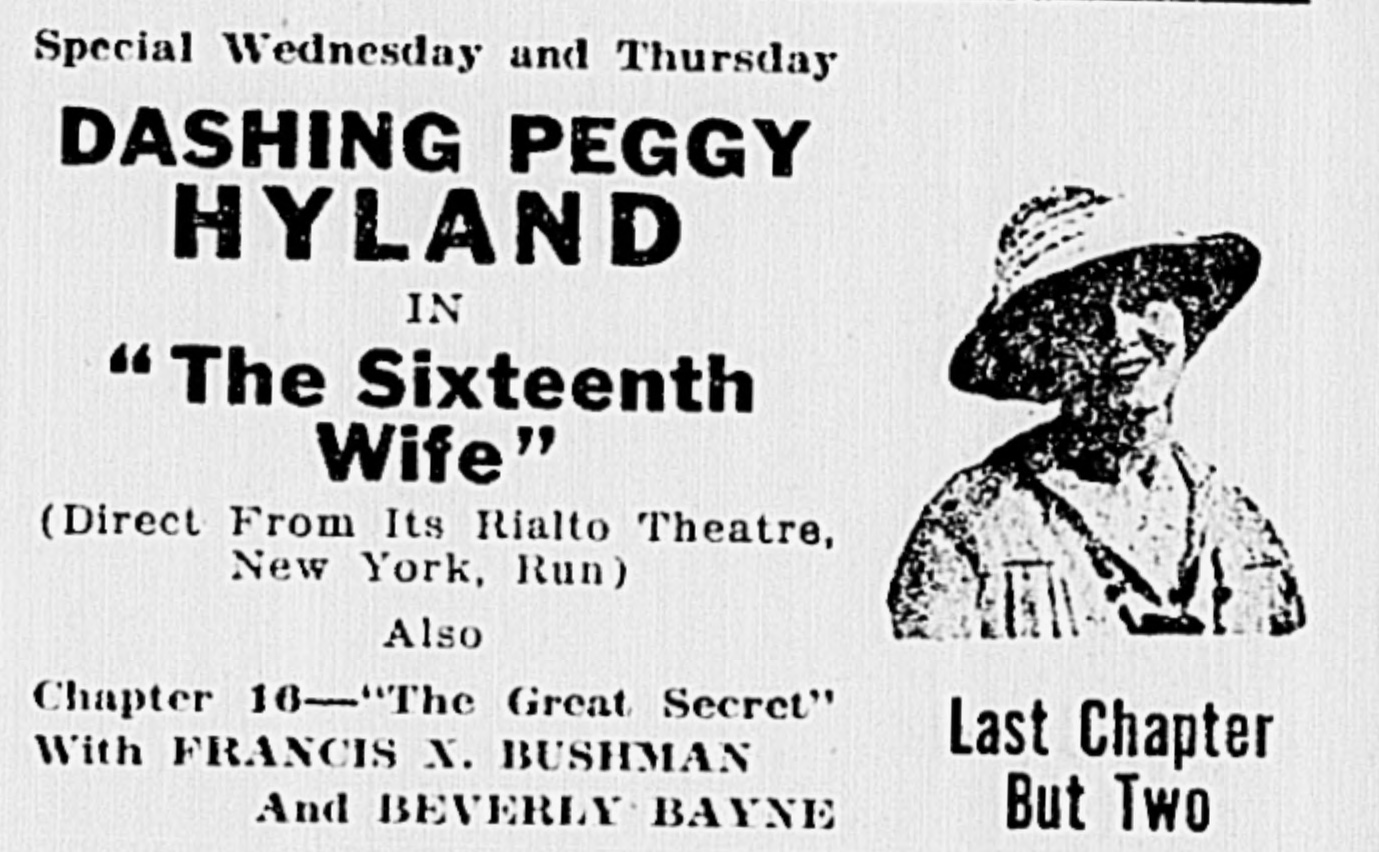
- Contemporary newspaper
- Directed by: Charles Brabin
- Written by: Molly Elliot Seawell; A. Van Buren Powell
- Starring: Peggy Hyland; Marc McDermott; George J. Forth
- Cinematography: Clark R. Nickerson
- Production company: Vitagraph Company of America
- Distributed by: V-L-S-E
- Release date: May 14, 1917
- Running time: 50 minutes
- Country: United States
- Languages: Silent; English intertitles

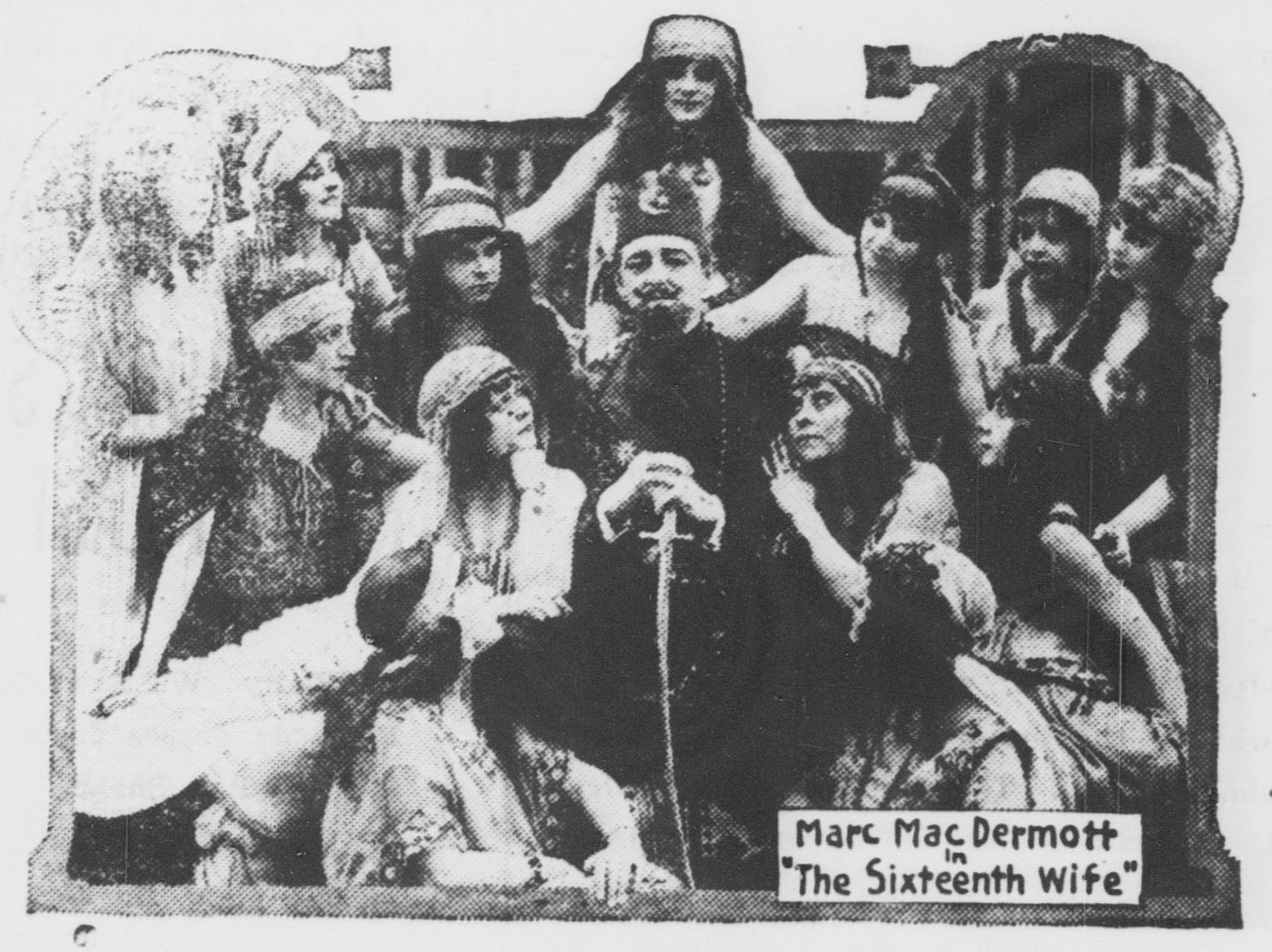
Film scene

The Sixteenth Wife is a 1917 American silent comedy-drama film directed by Charles Brabin and starring Peggy Hyland, Marc McDermott and George J. Forth.

== Cast ==
- Peggy Hyland as Olette
- Marc McDermott as Kadir El Raschid
- George J. Forth as Jimmy Warburton
- Templar Saxe as Hackel

== Censorship ==
Before The Sixteenth Wife could be exhibited in Kansas, the Kansas Board of Review required the removal of a smoking scene at the end of reel 3.

== Bibliography ==
- David Quinlan. Quinlan's Film Directors. Batsford, 1999.
