= The Honeypot (film) =

1920 film

- Directed by: Fred LeRoy Granville
- Written by: Oliver Sandys (novel)
- Starring: Peggy Hyland; Campbell Gullan; James Lindsay
- Production company: G.B. Samuelson Productions
- Distributed by: Granger
- Release date: 30 October 1920
- Country: United Kingdom
- Languages: Silent; English intertitles

The Honeypot is a 1920 British silent romance film directed by Fred LeRoy Granville and starring Peggy Hyland, Campbell Gullan and James Lindsay. It was made at Isleworth Studios. A sequel Love Maggy was released the following year.

== Cast ==
- Peggy Hyland as Maggie Delamere
- Campbell Gullan as Lord Chalfont
- James Lindsay as Fred Woolff
- Lillian Hall-Davis as Alexandra Hersey
- Alfred Drayton as De Preyne
- Maidie Hope as Lady Susan
- Grace Lane as Mrs. Lambert
- Lillian La Verne as Mrs. Bell

== Bibliography ==
- Low, Rachael. The History of the British Film 1918-1929. George Allen & Unwin, 1971.
