= Templar Saxe =

British opera singer (1865–1935)

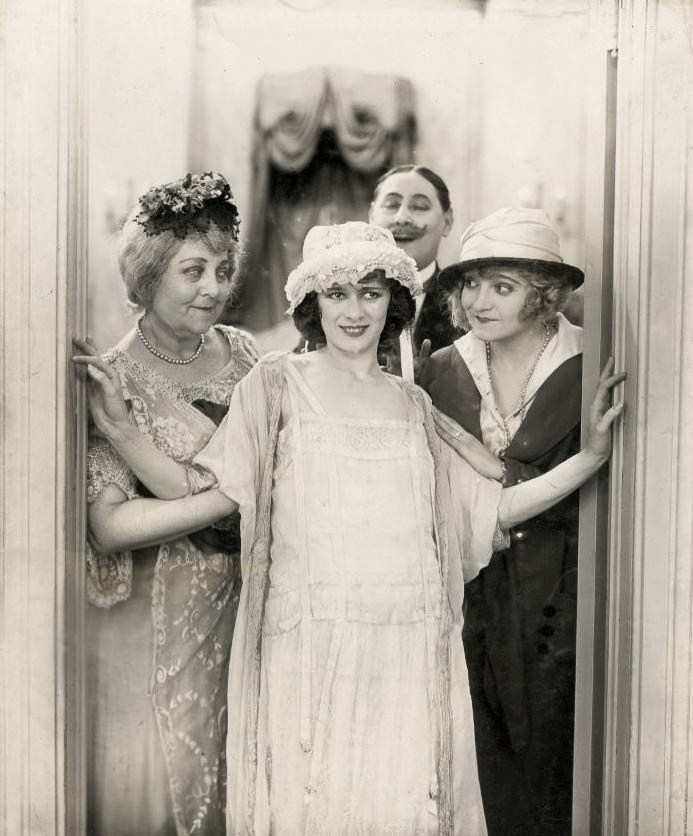
- Saxe in rear with actresses (from left) Hattie Delaro, Anita Stewart, and Gladys Valerie in The Mind the Paint Girl (1919)
- Born: Templer William Edward Edevein; August 22, 1865; Redhill, Surrey, England
- Died: April 17, 1935 (*some sources March 23, 1935); Cincinnati, Ohio
- Other name: Templer Saxe
- Occupations: Actor, Opera Singer
- Years active: 1888–1928

Templar Saxe (born Templer William Edward Edevein; August 22, 1865 – April 17, 1935) was a British-born stage actor, opera singer and silent film actor. In films, he usually was a character actor as his singing voice could not be used in silent films. He was born in Redhill, Surrey, England and died in Cincinnati, Ohio.

== Life and career ==
Templar Saxe was the son of Lady de Capel Broke and Eaton Edeveain, a prominent London barrister and journalist. He originally planned to join the diplomatic service, but chose performing instead.

=== Theatre ===
In 1901, he starred in Alfred E. Aarons' production of The Ladies' Paradise at the Metropolitan Opera House in New York City. In 1905, he starred in the Broadway production of The Earl and the Girl at the Casino Theatre, and was praised by The New York Times for his singing.

=== Film ===
In 1919, he starred in The Teeth of the Tiger. In 1927, he starred in When a Man Loves.

== Selected filmography ==
- Beauty Unadorned (1913)
- A Lily in Bohemia (1915)
- The Starring of Flora Finchurch (1915)
- Myrtle the Manicurist (1916)
- The Tarantula (1916)
- Intrigue (1917)
- The Sixteenth Wife (1917)
- Mary Jane's Pa (1917)
- The Fettered Woman (1917)
- Babette (1917)
- Womanhood, the Glory of the Nation (1917)
- The Triumph of the Weak (1918)
- Miss Ambition (1918)
- The Lion and the Mouse (1919)
- The Teeth of the Tiger (1919)
- Human Desire (1919)
- The Mind the Paint Girl (1919)
- The Dangerous Paradise (1920)
- Slaves of Pride (1920)
- Whispers (1920)
- Two Weeks (1920)
- Bucking the Tiger (1921)
- How Women Love (1922)
- What Fools Men Are (1922)
- In Search of a Thrill (1923)
- Sidewalks of New York (1923)
- Beau Brummel (1924)
- Captain Blood (1924)
- Her Night of Romance (1924)
- Gerald Cranston's Lady (1924)
- What Price Beauty? (1925)
- The Primrose Path (1925)
- Time, the Comedian (1925)
- The Dancers (1925)
- The White Black Sheep (1926)
- When a Man Loves (1927)
- The Girl from Gay Paree (1927)
- For Ladies Only (1927)
- Beyond London Lights (1928)
