= Two Weeks (1920 film) =

1920 film by Sidney Franklin

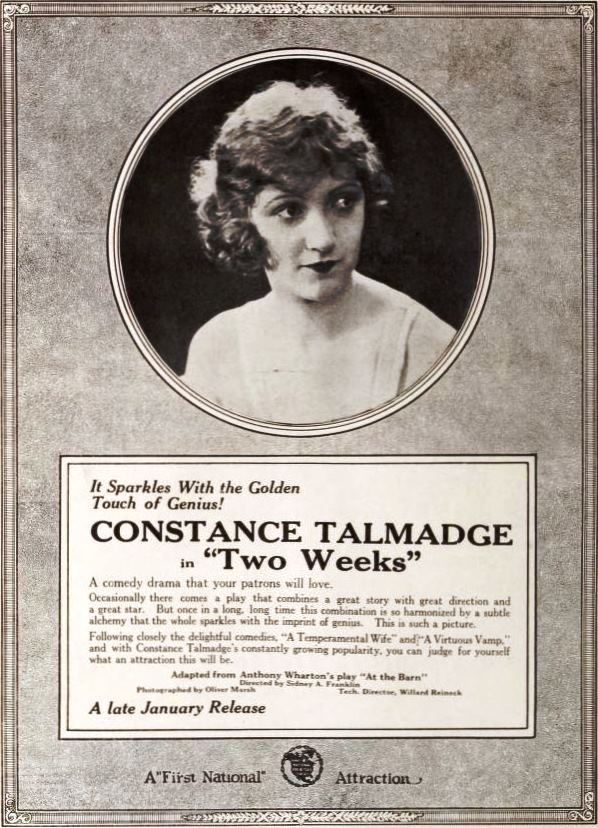
- Directed by: Sidney Franklin
- Written by: Anita Loos
- Based on: play At the Barn by Anthony Wharton
- Produced by: Joseph M. Schenck
- Starring: Constance Talmadge; Conway Tearle
- Cinematography: Oliver T. Marsh
- Distributed by: First National Exhibitors
- Release date: January 25, 1920
- Running time: 60 minutes
- Country: United States
- Languages: Silent film English intertitles

Two Weeks is a 1920 American silent film production and directed by Sidney Franklin. It starred Constance Talmadge and was produced by her brother-in-law Joseph M. Schenck. It was distributed through First National Exhibitors.

== Cast ==
- Constance Talmadge -
- Conway Tearle -
- Reginald Mason
- George Fawcett
- Templar Saxe
- William Frederic
- Tom Cameron

== Preservation status ==
The film is preserved in the Library of Congress collection and UCLA Film & Television Archive.
