= Forbidden Cargoes =

1926 film

- Directed by: Fred LeRoy Granville
- Written by: Mary Murillo, Douglas Stuart
- Produced by: Fred LeRoy Granville
- Starring: Peggy Hyland; Clifford McLaglen; James Lindsay; Daisy Campbell
- Production company: Granville
- Release date: January 11, 1926 (United Kingdom)
- Country: United Kingdom
- Languages: Silent; English intertitles

Forbidden Cargoes is a 1926 British silent adventure film directed by Fred LeRoy Granville and starring Peggy Hyland, Clifford McLaglen and James Lindsay.

== Cast ==
- Peggy Hyland as Violet
- Clifford McLaglen as John Tredennis
- James Lindsay as Sir Charles
- Guy Tilden Wright as Philip Sutton
- Bob Vallis as Black Mike
- J. Edwards Barker as Trefusis
- Daisy Campbell as Lady Tredennis
