= John Halifax, Gentleman (TV series) =

1974 British TV drama series

- Genre: Drama
- Based on: John Halifax, Gentleman by Dinah Craik
- Country of origin: United Kingdom
- Original language: English
- No. of episodes: 5

Original release
- Network: BBC One
- Release: 20 January – 17 February 1974

John Halifax, Gentleman is a British drama television series produced by John McRae that was originally broadcast by the BBC in five episodes in 1974. It was an adaptation of the novel John Halifax, Gentleman by Dinah Craik, who was credited as Mrs Craik.

Dramatised by Jack Ronder and directed by Tristan DeVere Cole, it was screened in the Sunday teatime slot on BBC One, which usually showed adaptations of classic novels. The script editor was Alistair Bell, Christine Ruscoe was the designer and Ursula Reid was in charge of costumes.

== Main cast ==
- Robert Coleby – John Halifax
- Gwen Taylor – Ursula March
- Tony Calvin – Phineas Fletcher

== With ==
- Daphne Heard - Jael
