= The Other Woman (1918 film) =

1918 film

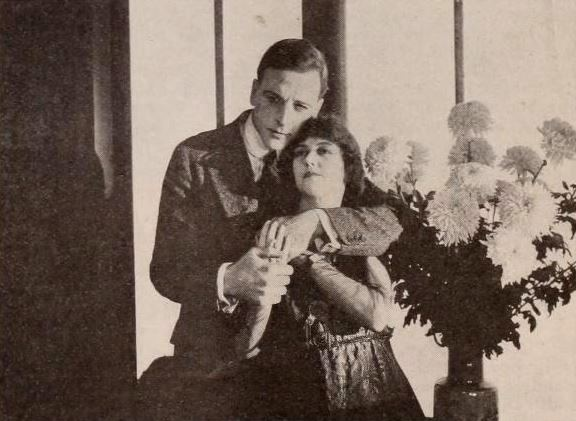
- Still with Sills and Hyland
- Directed by: Albert Parker
- Written by: Philip Bartholomae
- Based on: The Other Woman by Frederic Arnold Kummer
- Starring: Peggy Hyland; Milton Sills; Anna Lehr
- Production company: Astra Film
- Distributed by: Pathé Exchange
- Release date: February 3, 1918
- Running time: 50 minutes
- Country: United States
- Language: Silent (English intertitles)

The Other Woman is a 1918 American silent drama film directed by Albert Parker and starring Peggy Hyland, Milton Sills, and Anna Lehr. It is based upon the play of the same name by Frederic Arnold Kummer.

== Cast ==
- Peggy Hyland as Eleanor Gates
- Milton Sills as Mr. Harrington
- Anna Lehr as Mrs. Harrington
- William B. Davidson (Undetermined Role)

== Bibliography ==
- Connelly, Robert B. The Silents: Silent Feature Films, 1910-36, Volume 40, Issue 2. December Press, 1998.
