= Peggy Hyland =

British actress (1884–1973)

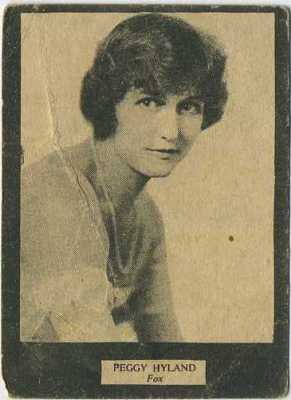
- c. 1920
- Born: Gladys Lucy Hutchinson; 11 June 1884; Harborne, Birmingham, Warwickshire, England
- Died: 19 September 1973 (aged 89); Tunbridge Wells, Kent, England
- Years active: 1914–1925
- Spouses: Owen Grant Evan-Thomas (m. 1914, divorced) Fred LeRoy Granville (m. 1923, divorced)

Peggy Hyland (born Gladys Lucy Hutchinson; 11 June 1884 – 19 September 1973) was an English silent film actress who after a brief period on the stage had a successful career as a silent film actress, appearing in at least 40 films in Great Britain and the United States between 1914 and 1925. In 1925 she returned to Britain after making her last film following which she lived a life of obscurity.

== Education ==
Peggy Hyland was born Gladys Lucy Hutchinson in 1884, the daughter of Dr. Cyril George Hutchinson and Ada Slack (née Marples). She had two sisters, Edith and Hilda, and a half sister, Ethel. She was educated in Britain and at convents in Europe. The first convent she attended was Seroule in Verviers, on the frontier of Belgium. It was the first town entered by the German Army in World War I.

== Film career ==
Hyland began acting after consulting a seer who foretold great success for the diminutive English girl. Once she played in support of Cyril Maude who is known for his Grumpy and The Basker. In 1914 she married Owen Grant Evan-Thomas (1861–1942), and on sailing to the United States in 1916 he was named as her next-of-kin. The marriage was later dissolved.

According to an interview in the magazine The Red Letter, the first film she appeared in was The Love of an Actress in 1914, in which she is thrown into the Thames. This was followed by John Halifax, Gentleman (1915), in which she played Ursula March. The same year, she appeared in Infelice, directed by L.C. MacBean and Fred Paul. In 1916, she portrayed Olette in The Sixteenth Wife and co-starred with E.H. Sothern in The Chattle. In 1917, she appeared in the drama Her Right to Live as the head of a brood of orphans destined for the poorhouse.

In The Merry-Go-Round (1919), Hyland plays Gypsy/Susie Alice Pomeroy. Newspapers of the era described the romance as one of the actress' best performances. In the Debt of Honour (1918) she sacrifices her good name to shield the reputation of a U.S. Senator who has taken her into his home as an orphan.

Hyland's film credits number forty. She remained active in films until 1925. Among her many appearances are roles in The Honeypot (1920), Faith (1920), Love Maggy (1921), Shifting Sands (1923), and Forbidden Cargoes (1925). Black Shadows was a 1920 Fox Film feature in which Peggy portrayed Marjorie Langdon. The production starred Allan Roscoe and was directed by Howard M. Mitchell.

== Later life ==
Hyland married Universal film producer Fred LeRoy Granville in Marylebone in London in March 1923. They later divorced. Her last film was released in 1925, when she also sailed to Liverpool, having previously resided in the United States. In 1948, she was living at 32 Paddington Street in London.

Hyland died on 19 September 1973 in Tunbridge Wells in Kent and was cremated there on 26 September 1973.

== Gallery ==
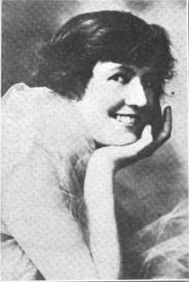
Peggy Hyland (1916)

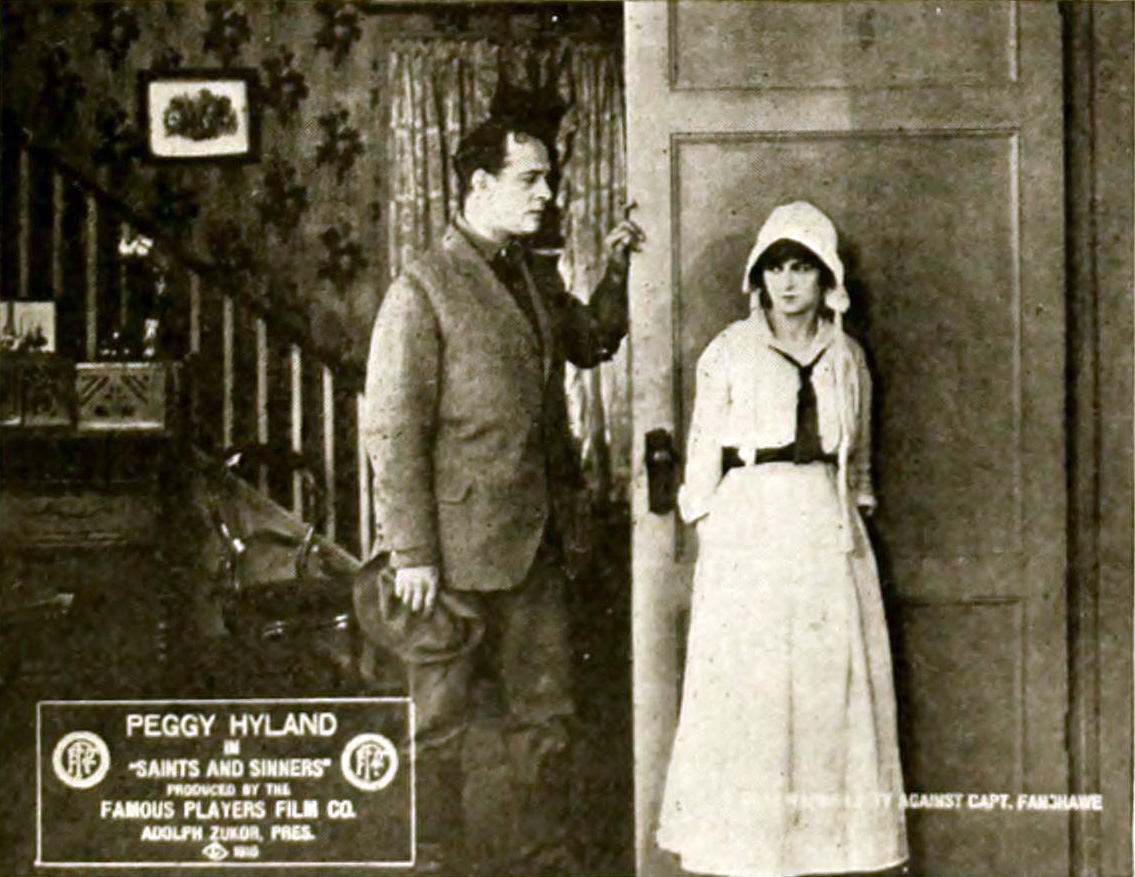
Saints and Sinners (1916)

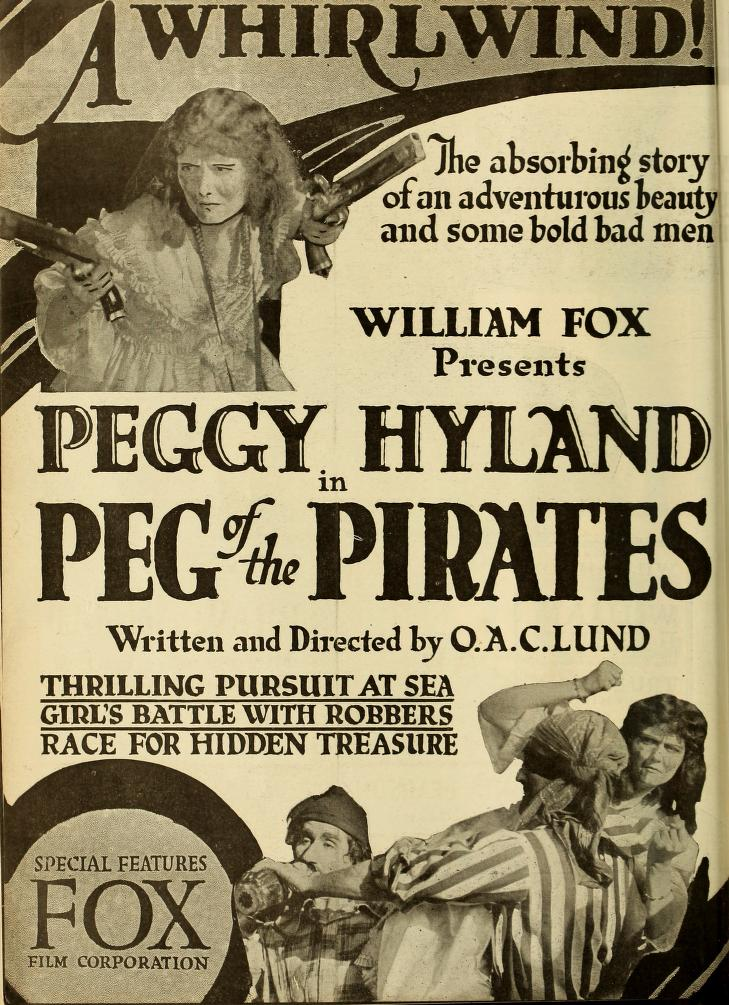
Peg of the Pirates (1918)

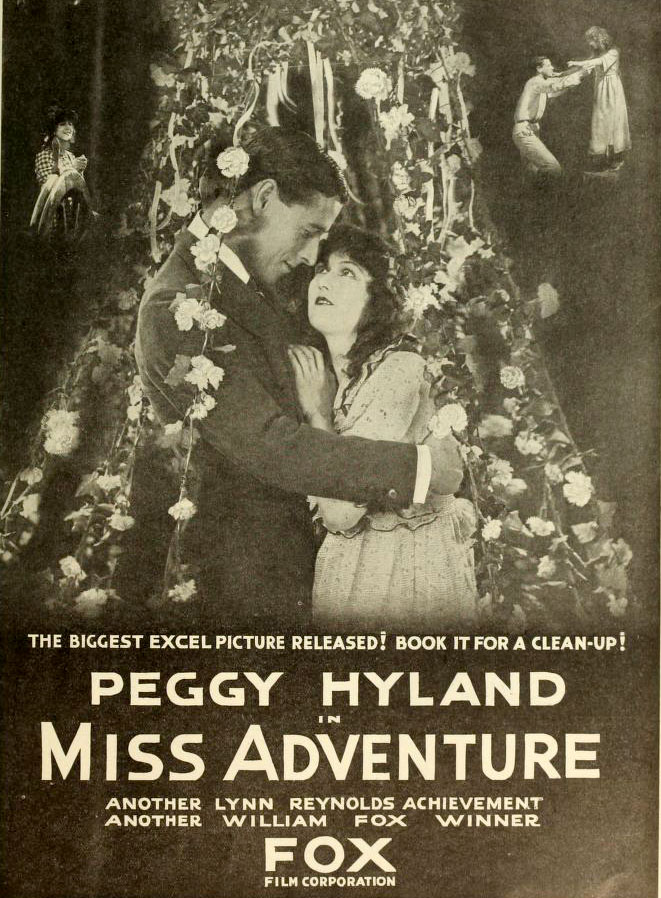
Miss Adventure (1919)

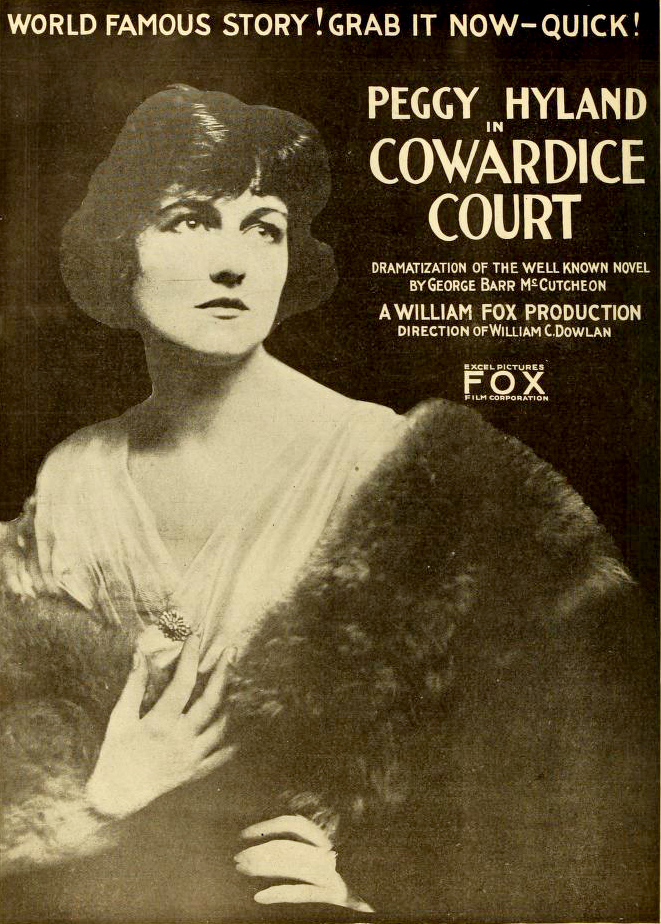
Cowardice Court (1919)

== Select filmography ==
- In the Ranks (1914)
- Infelice (1915)
- Caste (1915)
- John Halifax, Gentleman (1915)
- Sally Bishop (1916)
- A Pair of Spectacles (1916)
- Saints and Sinners (1916)
- The Chattel (1916)
- The Enemy (1916)
- Her Right to Live (1917)
- Babette (1917)
- The Sixteenth Wife (1917)
- Womanhood, the Glory of the Nation (1917)
- Bonnie Annie Laurie (1918)
- The Other Woman (1918)
- Other Men's Daughters (1918)
- The Web of Chance (1919)
- The Honeypot (1920)
- Faith (1920)
- The Price of Silence (1920) directed by Fred Leroy Granville
- Love Maggy (1921)
- Mr. Pim Passes By (1921)
- Shifting Sands (1922)
- Forbidden Cargoes (1925)
