= The Green Caravan =

1922 film

- Directed by: Edwin J. Collins
- Written by: Oliver Sandys (novel); Edwin J. Collins
- Starring: Catherine Calvert; Gregory Scott; Valia
- Production company: Master Films
- Distributed by: Granger
- Release date: November 1922
- Running time: 50 minutes
- Country: United Kingdom
- Languages: Silent; English intertitles

The Green Caravan is a 1922 British silent drama film directed by Edwin J. Collins and starring Catherine Calvert, Gregory Scott and Valia.

== Cast ==
- Catherine Calvert as Gypsy
- Gregory Scott as Hugo Drummond
- Valia as Lillian Vesey
- Ivo Dawson as Lord Listane
- Wallace Bosco as Sir Simeon Marks
- Sunday Wilshin as Maisie Gay
- Harry Newman as Hiram J. Mutt

== Bibliography ==
- Low, Rachael. History of the British Film, 1918-1929. George Allen & Unwin, 1971.
