= The Woman Who Obeyed =

1923 film

- Directed by: Sidney Morgan
- Written by: Sidney Morgan; Alicia Ramsey
- Starring: Stewart Rome; Hilda Bayley; Peter Dear
- Cinematography: Stanley Mumford
- Production company: Astra-National
- Release date: September 1923
- Country: United Kingdom
- Languages: Silent film English intertitles

The Woman Who Obeyed is a 1923 British silent film directed by Sidney Morgan and starring Stewart Rome, Hilda Bayley, and Peter Dear.

== Premise ==
An overbearing husband separates his wife from her children but is reconciled to her after he has accidentally killed their son.

== Cast ==
- Hilda Bayley as Marion Dorchester
- Stewart Rome as Dorchester
- Henri de Vries as Captain Conway
- Valia as Mrs. Bruce Carrington
- Gerald Ames as Raymond Straithmore
- Ivo Dawson as Duke of Rexford
- Peter Dear as Bobbie Dorchester
- Nancy Price as Governess
