= The Audacious Mr. Squire =

1923 British film by Edwin Greenwood

- Directed by: Edwin Greenwood
- Written by: Eliot Stannard
- Based on: Squire the Audacious by Sydney Bowkett
- Produced by: Edward Godal
- Starring: Jack Buchanan; Valia; Dorinea Shirley
- Production company: British & Colonial Kinematograph Company
- Distributed by: British & Colonial Kinematograph Company
- Release date: October 1923
- Running time: 5,000 feet
- Country: United Kingdom
- Language: English

The Audacious Mr. Squire is a 1923 British silent comedy film directed by Edwin Greenwood and starring Jack Buchanan, Valia and Dorinea Shirley. The film was written by Eliot Stannard and produced by Edward Godal.

== Cast ==
- Jack Buchanan as Tom Squire
- Valia as Constance
- Dorinea Shirley as Bessie
- Russell Thorndike as Harry Smallwood
- Malcolm Tod as Edgar
- Sidney Paxton as John Howard
- Forbes Dawson as Pitt
- Fred Rains as Jupp

== Bibliography ==
- Low, Rachael. History of the British Film, 1918-1929. George Allen & Unwin, 1971.
