= She Loves and Lies =

1920 film by Chester Withey

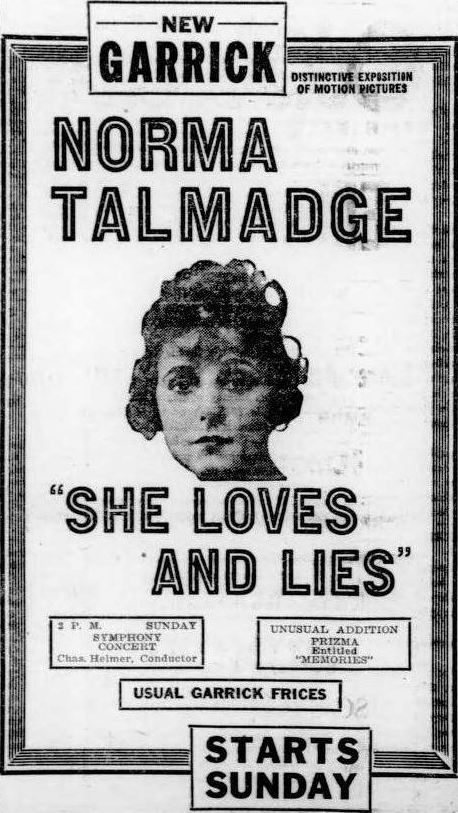
- Directed by: Chester Withey
- Written by: Grant Cooper; Chester Withey
- Based on: short story, She Loves and Lies, by Wilkie Collins writing in Romantic Tales c.1885
- Produced by: Joseph Schenck
- Starring: Norma Talmadge; Conway Tearle
- Cinematography: David Abel
- Production company: Norma Talmadge Film Corporation
- Distributed by: Select Pictures
- Release date: January 1920
- Running time: 72 minutes
- Country: United States
- Language: Silent (English intertitles)

She Loves and Lies is a 1920 American silent comedy drama film directed by Chester Withey and starring Norma Talmadge, Conway Tearle, and Octavia Broske.

An incomplete surviving print is preserved in the Library of Congress collection.

The film had the working title Two Women.

== Plot ==
As described in a film magazine, Marie Callender becomes engaged to a wealthy Lothario, but regrets it after Ernest Lismore, who is in financial difficulties, rescues her from a burning building. She breaks the engagement but is left the wealthy man's fortune. Learning of Ernest's predicament, she poses as an elderly woman and proposes that Ernest marry her to save himself from financial ruin. He agrees, and after their marriage Marie poses as a painter in the bohemian quarter of the city to see if Ernest will love her. After several difficulties Marie removes her wig and Ernest happily discovers that she is the painter who won his heart.

== Cast ==
- Norma Talmadge as Marie Callender / Marie Max / June Dayne
- Conway Tearle as Ernest Lismore
- Octavia Broske as Polly Poplar
- Phillips Tead as Bob Brummel
- Ida Darling as Carrie Chisholm
- John T. Dillon (minor role)
- Eva Gordon (minor role)
