= Walter Blakeley =

British cinematographer

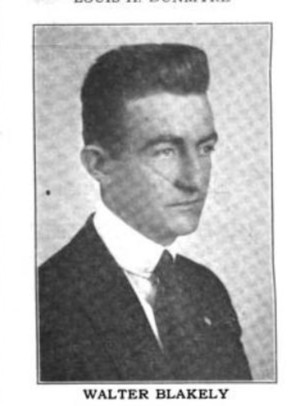
- 1917 portrait
- Born: 1894
- Died: 1941 (aged 46–47)
- Occupation: Cinematographer
- Years active: 1917–1936 (film)

Walter Blakeley (1894–1941) was a British cinematographer.

== Selected filmography ==
- The Lincoln Cycle (1917)
- Shifting Sands (1922)
- Married ? (1926)
- The Highbinders (1926)
- The First Born (1928)
- Stranglehold (1931)
- No Funny Business (1933)
- Irish Hearts (1934)
- Dick Turpin (1934)
- Street Song (1935)
- Tomorrow We Live (1936)

== Bibliography ==
- Low, Rachael. Filmmaking in 1930s Britain. George Allen & Unwin, 1985.
