= The New Moon (1919 film) =

1919 film by Chester Withey

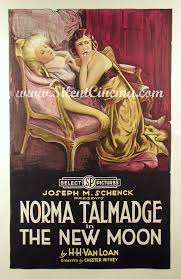
- Directed by: Chester Withey
- Written by: Chester Withey; H. H. Van Loan
- Produced by: Norma Talmadge
- Starring: Norma Talmadge
- Cinematography: David Abel
- Distributed by: Select Pictures
- Release date: May 11, 1919
- Running time: 72 minutes
- Country: USA
- Language: Silent..English intertitles

The New Moon is a 1919 American silent adventure drama film directed by Chester Withey and produced by and starring Norma Talmadge, with Pedro de Cordoba and Charles K. Gerrard.

== Plot ==
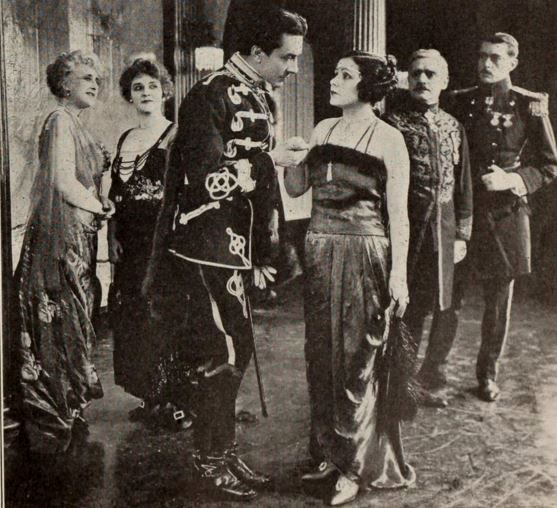
Still from the film published in the April 26, 1919 Exhibitors Herald

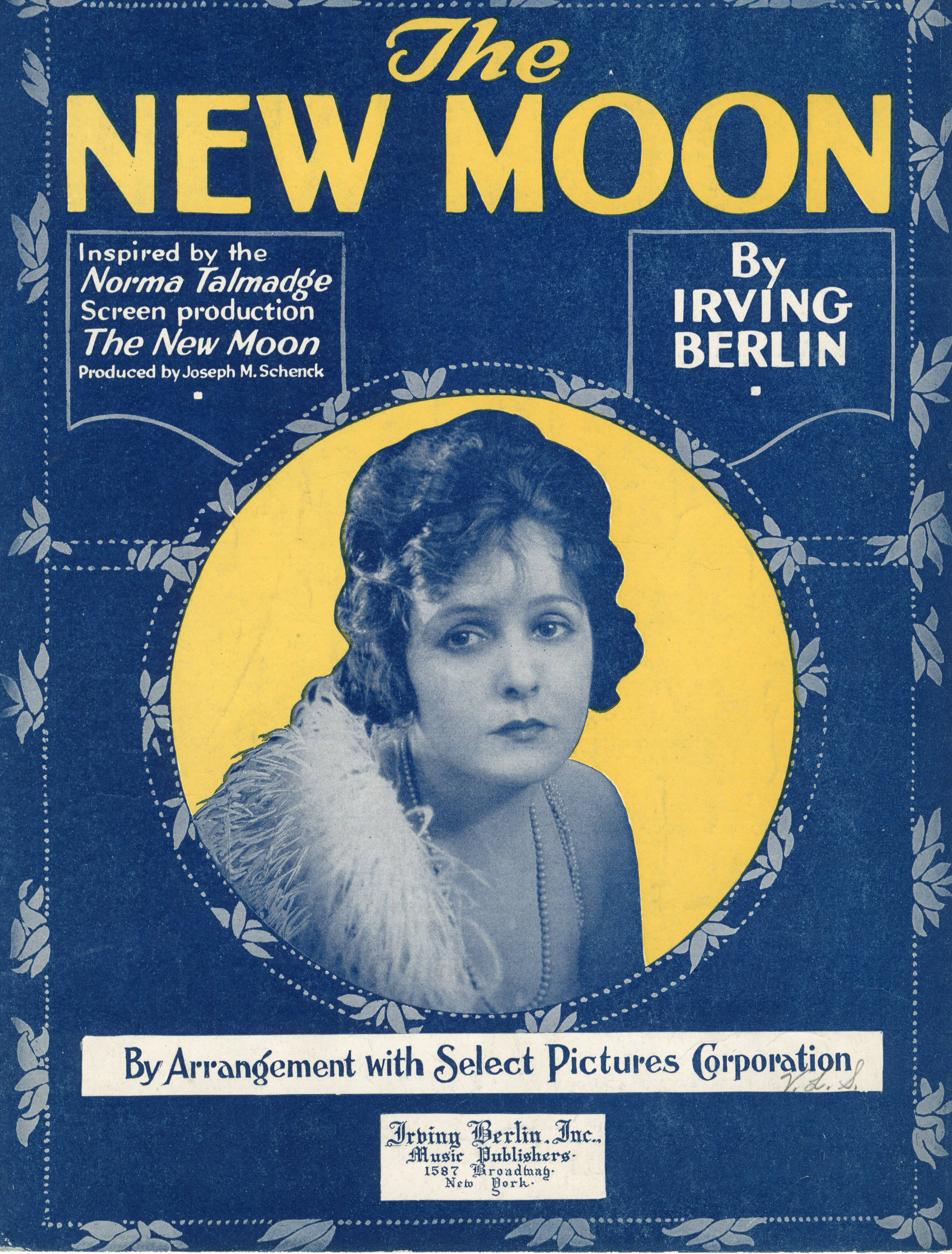
1919 sheet music cover for an Irving Berlin song inspired by the film

Princess Maria Pavlovna is at a grand ball in the palace of the Pavlovnas, given in honor of her engagement to Prince Michail Koloyar. Marie reveals a democratic side in her kind treatment of the peasants, and is beloved by them.

In the midst of the gaiety, a Bolshevik mob led by Orel Kosloff invades the palace to ruthlessly kill and plunder, leaving the palace in ruins. Kosloff is actually a tool of an uninvited guest, Theo Kameneff, who is only a pretend Red, being paid by a foreign government to ruin Russia. The Prince makes one gallant fight after another to save Marie, and finally succeeds in sending her away in a carriage, but loses track of her as he makes his own escape.

Disguising himself as a peasant courier, who is a Red, with access to military centers, he searches for her. Michail is caught and ordered to be shot, but he escapes. She, meanwhile, using her jewels, manages to purchase a grocery store in the village of Volsk, to provide a hideout. She creates the peasant identity of Sonia Sazonoff to run the store as its shopkeeper.

By accident, Marie is discovered by the unscrupulous Kameneff, who is now in love with her, though he is unknown to her. He issues a mandate that all females between 17 and 32 must register, and Marie does so under her assumed name, supposing it is for good work.

The women are undeceived when they find a second mandate makes them national property at the disposal of men. They appeal to Marie at a moment when Kameneff is within hearing. She says she will make an appeal to Kameneff.

Once she is alone with him, he reveals his identity and offers to revoke the order if she will live under his protection. With indomitable spirit, she denies him. Instead, she secretly helps women escape to the border. An orgy of brutality follows. Kosloff rapes potter Vasili Lazoff's daughter. Marie locks Kameneff's sister, Nadia Kameneff, in a room to keep her away from one of his lustful henchmen. He tries to break open the door with an ax, and Marie grabs a large whip and beats him. He throws the ax, missing her face by inches. He then wrestles her to the floor before being driven off by an ax-wielding Lazoff. Marie is caught aiding women to escape and becomes a candidate for execution. She is arrested and taken to Kameneff's headquarters. Lazoff becomes an instrument of vengeance and chokes the brutal Kosloff to death. Kameneff, meanwhile, has executed a group of women, including his own sister. Michail, despite being told that Marie is Kameneff's mistress, goes to her rescue, and reads her innocence in her eyes. Lazoff holds the pistol that Kameneff uses to commit suicide. Michail and Marie escape across the border, to enjoy new freedom and true happiness, though betrothed under the unlucky full moon (sic, confusing full moon with new moon; but, in the film, only a crescent moon is shown.) [Source: adapted and compiled from various sources at https://web.stanford.edu/~gdegroat/NT/oldreviews/nm.htm#variety, with additional information from Janiss Garza at https://www.allmovie.com/movie/v103825]

== Cast ==
- Norma Talmadge - Princess Marie Pavlovna
- Pedro de Cordoba - Prince Michail Koloyar
- Charles K. Gerrard - Theo Kameneff
- Stuart Holmes - Orel Kosloff
- Marc McDermott - Vasili Lazoff
- Ethel Kaye - Masha Lazoff
- Harry Sothern - Leo Pushkin
- Marguerite Clayton - Nadia Kameneff
- Mathilde Brundage -

== Preservation status ==
- The film is preserved incomplete (1 reel missing) in the Library of Congress Packard Campus for Audio-Visual Conservation collection.

== Gallery ==
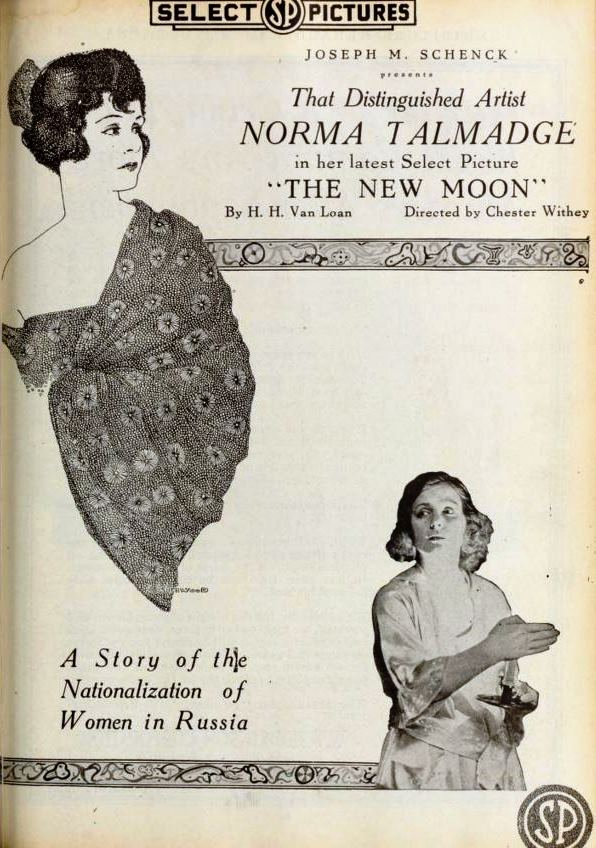
Advertisement for the film in a 1919 Exhibitors Herald.

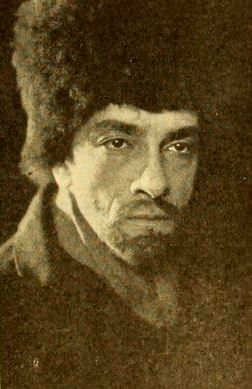
Pedro de Cordoba in character, pictured in a 1919 Moving Picture World.

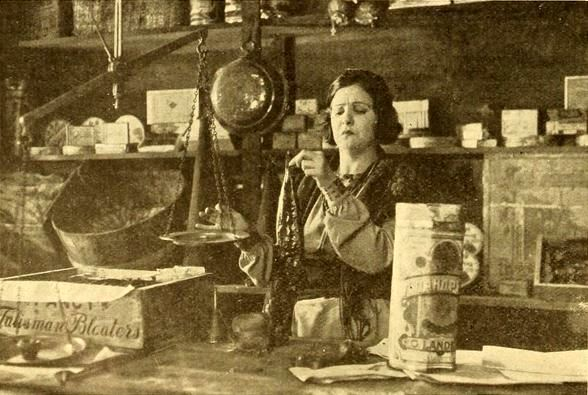
Still from the film.

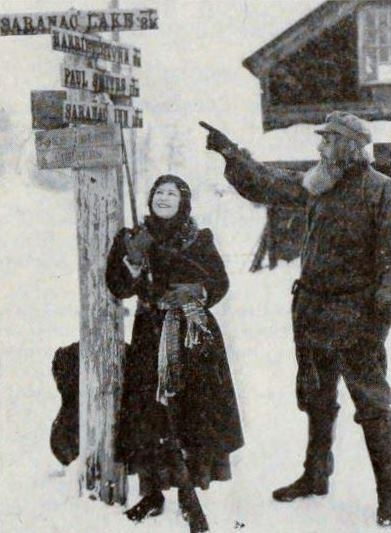
Still from the film published in a 1919 Exhibitor's Herald.

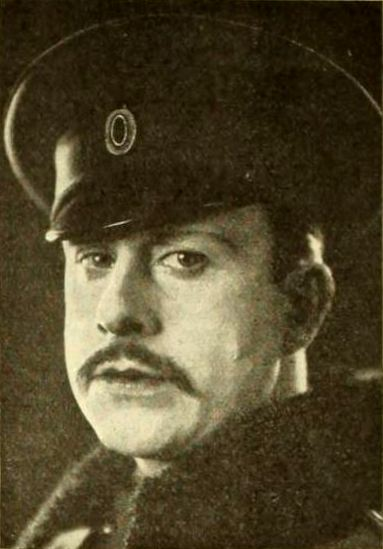
Stuart Holmes in character, published in a 1919 Moving Picture World.
