= The Old Folks at Home (film) =

1916 silent film by Chester Withey

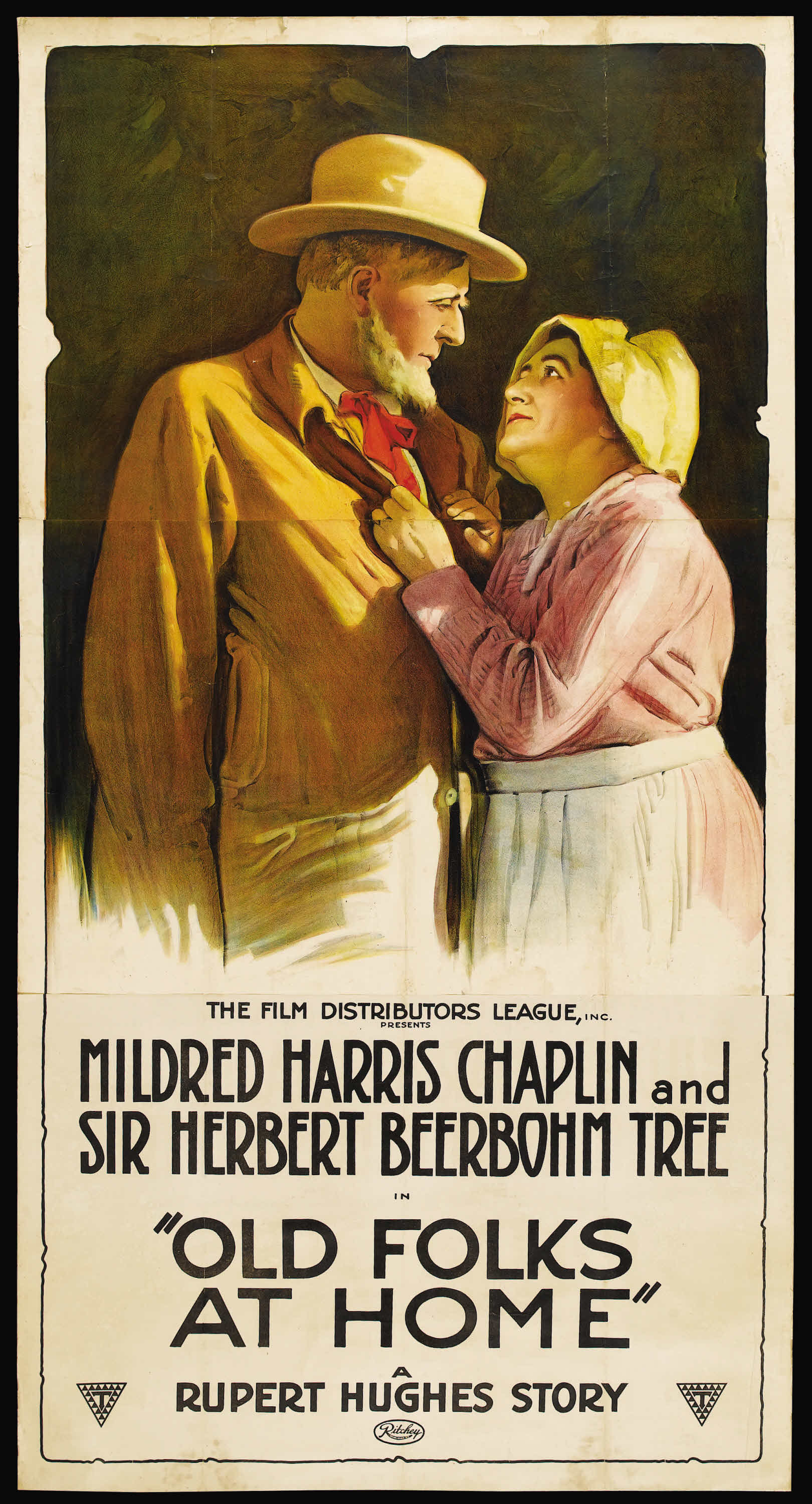
- Film poster
- Directed by: Chester Withey
- Written by: Chester Withey
- Story by: Rupert Hughes
- Production company: Fine Arts Film Company
- Distributed by: Triangle Distributing; Film Distributors League
- Release date: October 15, 1916 (U.S.)
- Country: United States

The Old Folks at Home is a 1916 American drama silent black and white film directed by Chester Withey. It is based on the story by Rupert Hughes.

== Cast ==
- Sir Herbert Beerbohm Tree as John Coburn
- Josephine Crowell as Mrs. Coburn
- Elmer Clifton as Steve Coburn
- Mildred Harris as Marjorie
- Lucille Young as Lucia Medina
- W.E. Lawrence as Stanley
- Spottiswoode Aitken as Judge
- Alfred Paget
- Wilbur Higby
- Charles Lee

== Preservation ==
The survival of this title is unclear. One source says it survives and another says it doesn't.
