= Octavia Broske =

American actress (1886–1967)

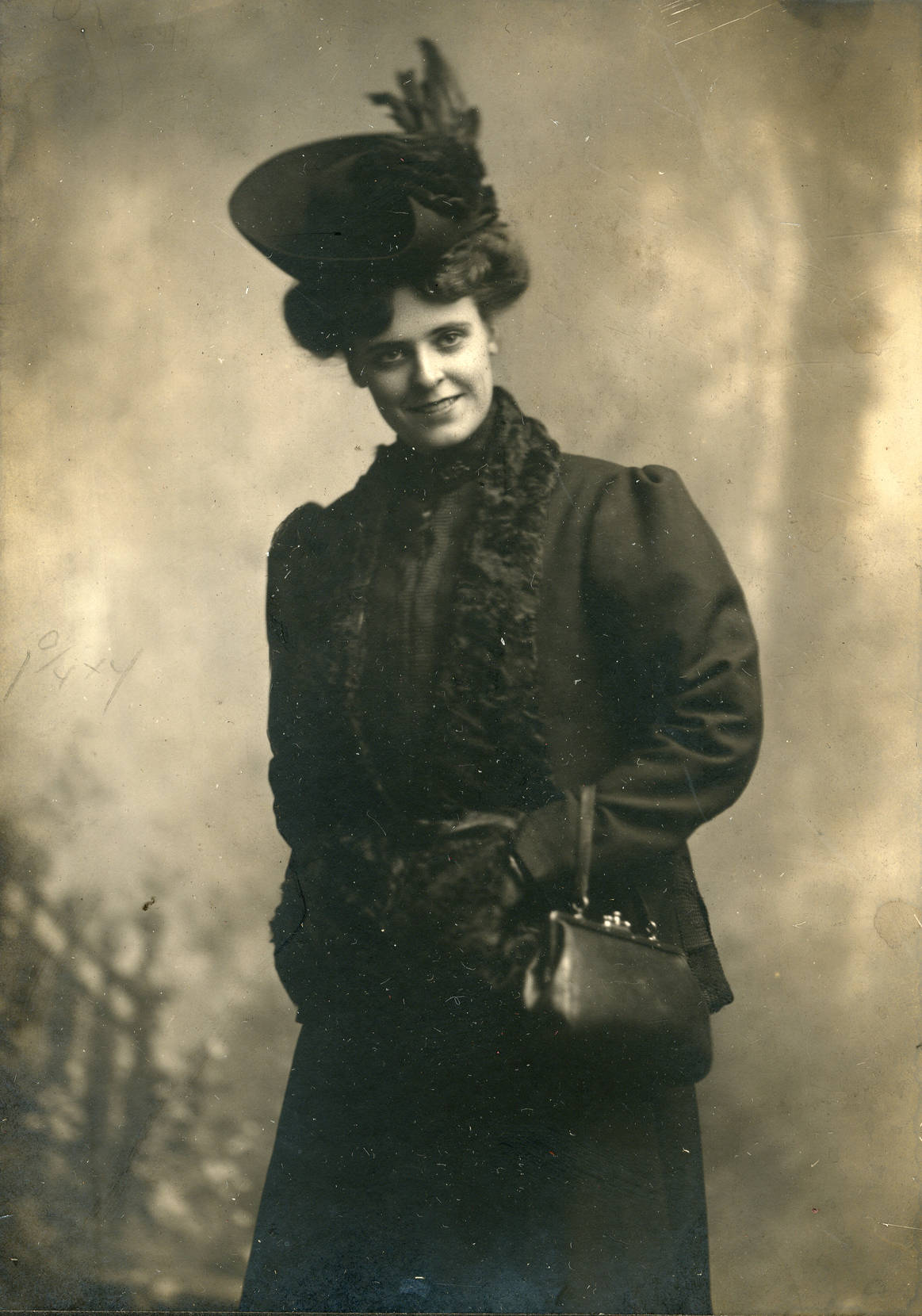
- Octavia Broske, from a 1905 photograph.
- Born: June 4, 1886
- Died: March 19, 1967 (aged 80); Los Angeles, California
- Other names: Octavia Burke, Octavia Bancroft (married names)
- Occupations: Actress, musical performer
- Spouse: George Bancroft

Octavia Broske (June 4, 1886 – March 19, 1967) was an American actress and musical performer.

== Career ==
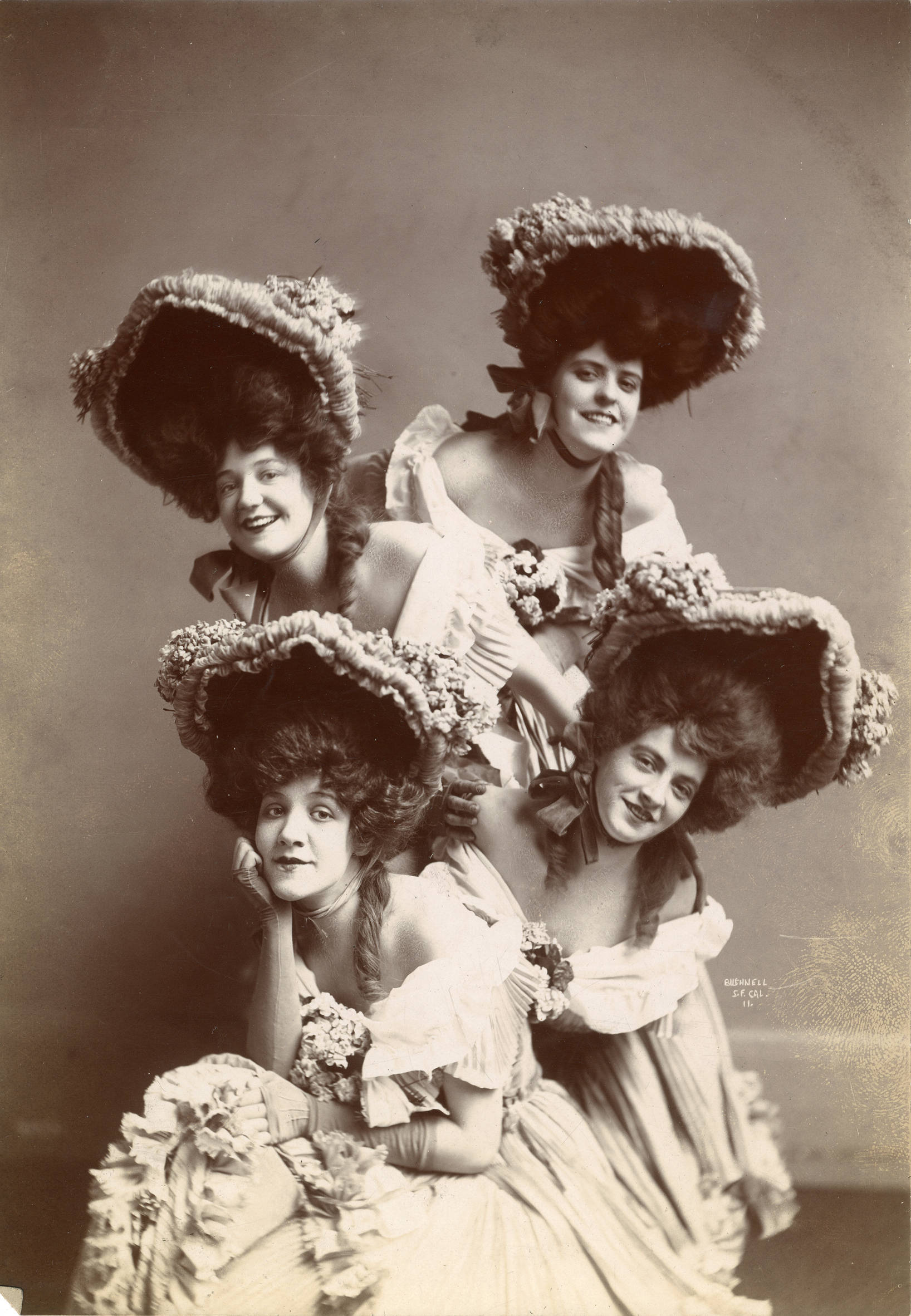
The four Boston Schoolma'ams in The Sultan of Sulu, which opened Jan. 29, 1905, at the Grand Opera House, Seattle. Includes Octavia Broske (upper right).

Broske's stage career began in San Francisco. Her Broadway roles included parts in The Jersey Lily (1903), Tillie's Nightmare (1910–1911), A La Broadway (1911), Oh! Oh! Delphine! (1912–1913), Madame Moselle (1914), Papa's Darling (1914–1915), and A Lonely Romeo (1919). Away from Broadway, Broske was seen in The Sultan of Sulu (1905–1906), A Waltz Dream (1909), Her Left Shoulder (1912), and Get Off My Carpet (1918). She and her second husband toured as a vaudeville act titled "International Stars of Song."

In 1916, Broske made a recording for Victor. She appeared in two silent films, She Loves and Lies (1920, also marketed as The Marriage Swindle) with Norma Talmadge, and The Great Adventure (1921), with Lionel Barrymore.

== Personal life ==
Broske married twice. She divorced her first husband, George C. Burke, in 1913. She married her second husband, actor George Bancroft, in 1916. They had a daughter, Georgette (1917–2002). In the 1930s, the legality of the Bancrofts' marriage was questioned in court, because it was unclear whether he had ever divorced his first wife, Edna Brothers Bancroft. Octavia Broske Bancroft was widowed in 1956, and died in 1967, aged 80 years, in Los Angeles.
