= Shifting Sands (1922 film) =

1922 silent film

- Directed by: Fred LeRoy Granville
- Starring: Peggy Hyland; Louis Willoughby; Valia
- Cinematography: Silvano Balboni; Walter Blakeley
- Production company: Luxor Pictures
- Distributed by: Hodkinson Pictures
- Release dates: November 30, 1922 (UK); November 11, 1923 (US)
- Running time: 60 minutes
- Country: United States
- Languages: Silent; English intertitles

Shifting Sands is a 1922 American silent drama film directed by Fred LeRoy Granville and starring Peggy Hyland, Louis Willoughby and Valia.

== Cast ==
- Peggy Hyland as Barbara Thayer
- Louis Willoughby as Dr. WillardLindsay
- Valia as Yvonne Lindsay
- Richard Atwood as Pierre Moreau
- Gibson Gowland as Samuel Thayer
- Tony Melford as Leroy Lindsay, age 4
- Douglas Webster as Leroy Linsay, age 14

== Bibliography ==
- Munden, Kenneth White. The American Film Institute Catalog of Motion Pictures Produced in the United States, Part 1. University of California Press, 1997.
