= Chappy—That's All =

1924 British film by Thomas Bentley

- Directed by: Thomas Bentley
- Written by: Oliver Sandys (novel); Eliot Stannard
- Starring: Joyce Dearsley; Gertrude McCoy; Lewis Gilbert
- Production company: Stoll Pictures
- Distributed by: Stoll Pictures
- Release date: July 1924
- Country: United Kingdom
- Language: English

Chappy—That's All is a 1924 British silent drama film directed by Thomas Bentley and starring Joyce Dearsley, Gertrude McCoy and Lewis Gilbert. It was based on a novel by Oliver Sandys. It was made at Stoll Pictures' Cricklewood Studios.

== Cast ==
- Joyce Dearsley as Chappy
- Gertrude McCoy as Bettina
- Lewis Gilbert as Piper
- Eva Westlake as Mrs. Cherry
- Edwin Greenwood as Slim Jim
- Francis Lister

== Bibliography ==
- Low, Rachael. History of the British Film, 1918-1929. George Allen & Unwin, 1971.
