= Babette (film) =

1917 American silent film

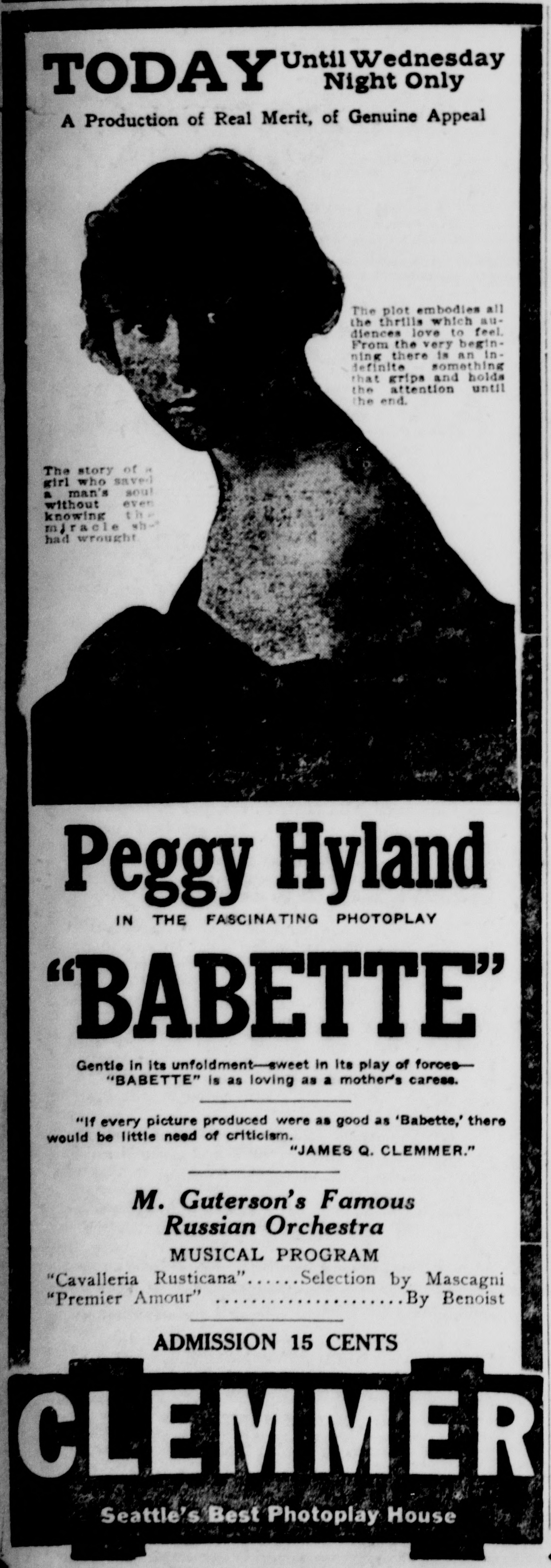
- Contemporary newspaper
- Directed by: Charles Brabin
- Written by: Frank Berkeley Smith (novel); A. Van Buren Powell
- Starring: Marc McDermott; Peggy Hyland; Templar Saxe
- Cinematography: Joseph Shelderfer
- Production company: Vitagraph Company of America
- Distributed by: Greater Vitagraph
- Release date: April 2, 1917
- Running time: 50 minutes
- Country: United States
- Languages: Silent; English intertitles

Babette is a 1917 American silent drama film directed by Charles Brabin and starring Marc McDermott, Peggy Hyland and Templar Saxe.

== Cast ==
- Marc McDermott as Raveau
- Peggy Hyland as Babette
- Templar Saxe as Pivot
- William R. Dunn as Guinard

== Preservation ==
With no holdings located in archives, Babette is considered a lost film.

== Bibliography ==
- Parish, James Robert & Pitts, Michael R. . Film Directors: A Guide to their American Films. Scarecrow Press, 1974.
