= Lessons in Love (1921 film) =

1921 film

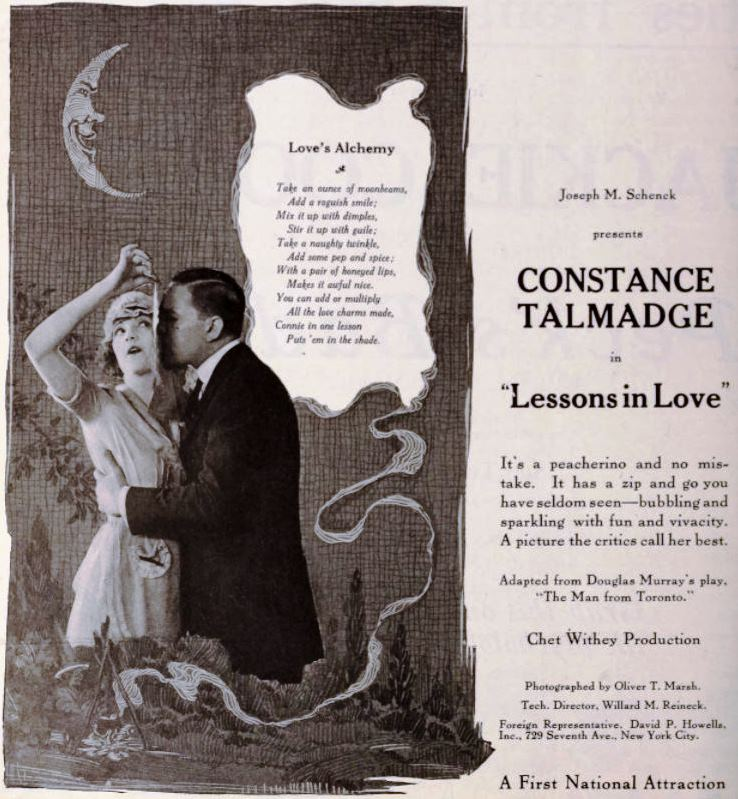
- Directed by: Chester Withey
- Written by: Grant Carpenter
- Starring: Constance Talmadge
- Distributed by: First National Pictures
- Release date: January 23, 1921
- Running time: 50 minutes
- Country: United States
- Language: Silent (English intertitles)

Lessons in Love is a 1921 American silent romantic comedy film directed by Chester Withey. A print exists in the film holdings of the Cohen Film Collection.

== Plot ==
Lessons in Love is "a fast-paced farce about an heiress who pretends to be the family maid in order to determine the true intentions of a potential suitor". The story was adapted from a Douglas Murray stage play, The Man from Toronto.

== Cast ==
- Constance Talmadge
- Flora Finch
- James Harrison
- George Fawcett
- Kenneth Harlan
- Florence Short
- Louise Lee
- Frank Webster

== History ==
Lessons in Love was well-reviewed in 1921, as "a corking-good comedy drama". It has been digitally restored and was screened at the Wexner Center for the Arts in Ohio in 2008, on a double bill with a Norma Talmadge film, The Sign on the Door (1921).
