= Love Maggy =

1921 film

- Directed by: Fred LeRoy Granville
- Written by: Oliver Sandys (novel); Colden Lore
- Starring: Peggy Hyland; Campbell Gullan; James Lindsay
- Production company: Screen Plays
- Distributed by: Granger
- Release date: January 1921
- Country: United Kingdom
- Languages: Silent; English intertitles

Love Maggy is a 1921 British silent drama film directed by Fred LeRoy Granville and starring Peggy Hyland, Campbell Gullan and James Lindsay. It was made at Isleworth Studios as a sequel to the 1920 film The Honeypot.

== Cast ==
- Peggy Hyland as Maggy Chalfont
- Campbell Gullan as Lord Chalfont
- James Lindsay as Fred Woolf
- Maudie Dunham as Joan
- Maidie Hope as Lady Susan
- Lillian Hall-Davis as Alexandra Hersey
- Alfred Drayton as De Preyne
- Fred Thatcher as Lord Lancing
- Mabel Terry-Lewis as Lady Shelford
- Alfred Wood as Mr. Simmons
- Saba Raleigh as Mrs. Simmons

== Bibliography ==
- Quinlan, David. The illustrated encyclopedia of movie character actors. Harmony Books, 1986.
