= Man and His Kingdom (film) =

1922 silent film by Maurice Elvey

- Directed by: Maurice Elvey
- Written by: E. Phillips Oppenheim (novel); Kinchen Wood
- Starring: Valia; Harvey Braban; Bertram Burleigh
- Production company: Stoll Pictures
- Distributed by: Stoll Pictures
- Release date: August 1922
- Country: United Kingdom
- Languages: Silent; English intertitles

Man and His Kingdom is a 1922 British silent adventure film directed by Maurice Elvey and starring Valia, Harvey Braban and Bertram Burleigh. It is an adaptation of The Man and His Kingdom, an 1899 novel by E. Phillips Oppenheim.

== Cast ==
- Valia as Lucia Rimarez
- Harvey Braban as Sagasta
- Bertram Burleigh as Eugene Rimarez
- Lewis Gilbert as President Rimarez
- Gladys Jennings as Ternissa Dennison
- M.A. Wetherell as Gregory Dane

== Bibliography ==
- Palmer, Scott. British Film Actors' Credits, 1895-1987. McFarland, 1988.
