= Other Men's Daughters (1918 film) =

1918 film

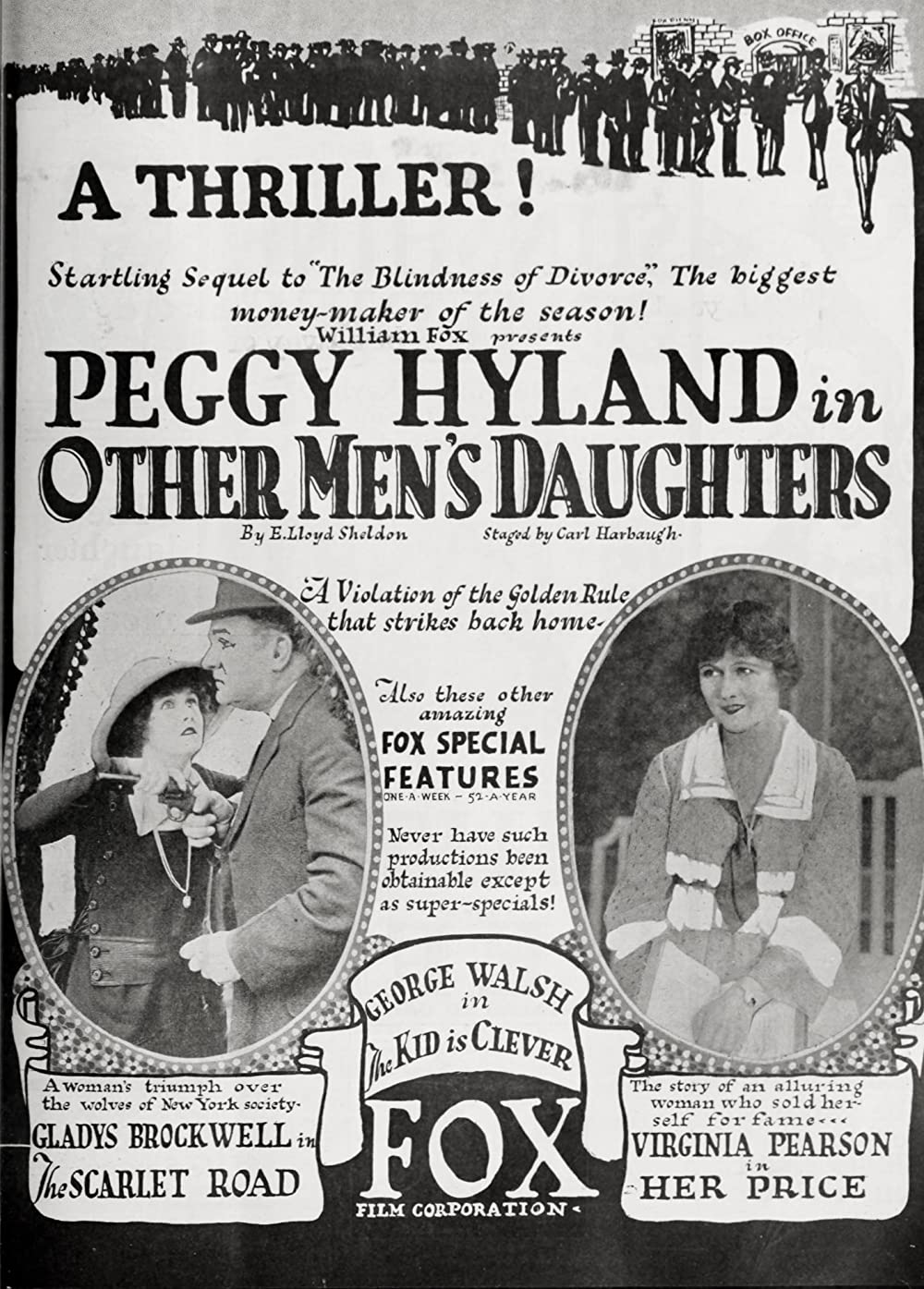
- Directed by: Carl Harbaugh
- Written by: E. Lloyd Sheldon
- Produced by: William Fox
- Starring: Peggy Hyland; Eric Mayne; Riley Hatch
- Cinematography: Benjamin Struckman
- Production company: Fox Film Corporation
- Distributed by: Fox Film Corporation
- Release date: July 7, 1918
- Running time: 50 minutes
- Country: United States
- Languages: Silent; English intertitles

Other Men's Daughters is a 1918 American silent drama film directed by Carl Harbaugh and starring Peggy Hyland, Eric Mayne and Riley Hatch.

== Cast ==
- Peggy Hyland as Shirley Reynolds
- Eric Mayne as Shirley's Father
- Elizabeth Garrison as Shirley's Mother
- Regina Quinn as Lola Wayne
- Riley Hatch as Lola's Father
- Frank Goldsmith as Trask
- Robert Middlemass as Richard Ormsby

== Bibliography ==
- Connelly, Robert B. The Silents: Silent Feature Films, 1910-36, Volume 40, Issue 2. December Press, 1998.
- Munden, Kenneth White. The American Film Institute Catalog of Motion Pictures Produced in the United States, Part 1. University of California Press, 1997.
- Solomon, Aubrey. The Fox Film Corporation, 1915-1935: A History and Filmography. McFarland, 2011.
