= The Man and His Kingdom =

1899 novel by E. Phillips Oppenheim

Man and His Kingdom
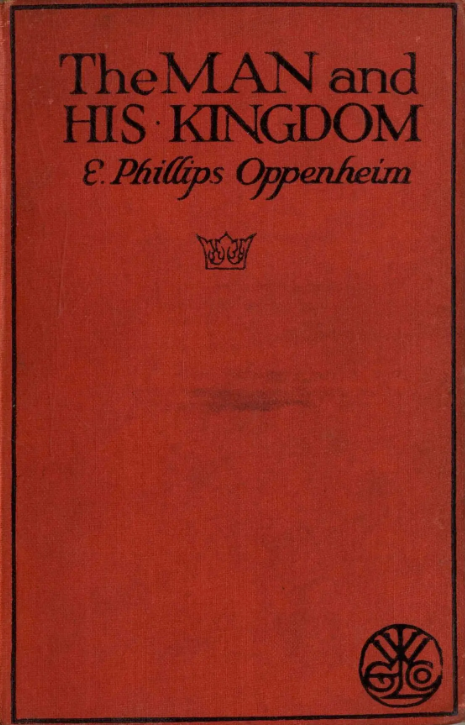
- Author: E. Phillips Oppenheim
- Language: English
- Genre: Adventure
- Publication date: 1899
- Publication place: United Kingdom
- Media type: Print

The Man and His Kingdom is an 1899 novel by the English novelist E. Phillips Oppenheim. It is an adventure novel set in South America.

== Film adaptation ==
In 1922 the novel was turned into a film Man and His Kingdom directed by Maurice Elvey.

== Bibliography ==
- Goble, Alan. The Complete Index to Literary Sources in Film. Walter de Gruyter, 1999.
