= Dinah Craik =

English novelist and poet (1826–1887)

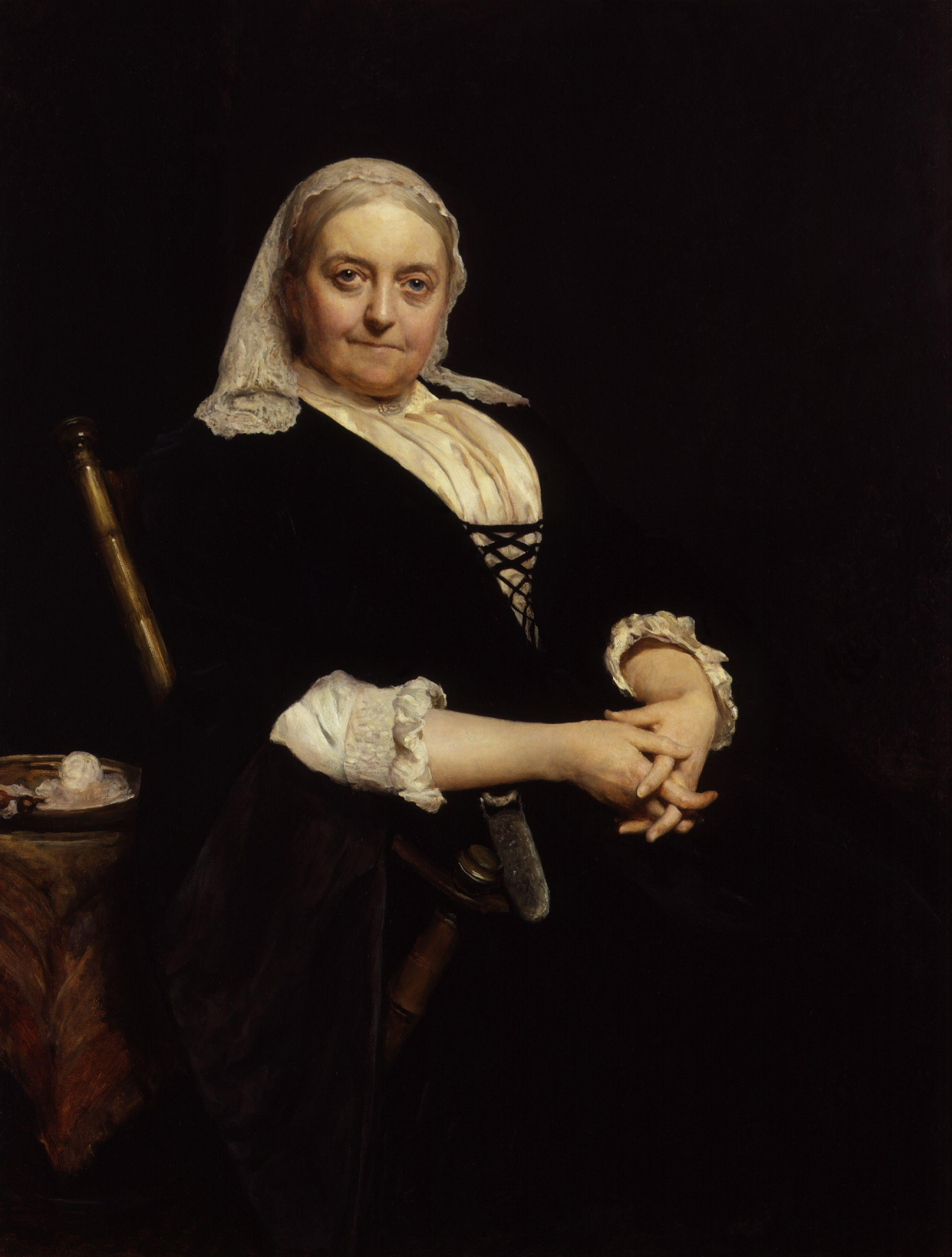
- 1887 portrait by Hubert von Herkomer
- Born: Dinah Maria Mulock; 20 April 1826; Stoke-on-Trent, Staffordshire, England
- Died: 12 October 1887 (aged 61); Shortlands, London, England
- Other names: Mrs. Craik, Miss Mulock
- Occupations: Novelist; poet
- Spouse: George Lillie Craik (m. 1865)
- Children: 1

Dinah Maria Craik (/kreɪk/; born Dinah Maria Mulock, often credited as Miss Mulock or Mrs. Craik; 20 April 1826 – 12 October 1887) was an English novelist and poet. She wrote the novel, John Halifax, Gentleman, which presents the mid-Victorian ideals of English middle-class life.

== Life ==
Mulock was born on 20 April 1826, at Stoke-upon-Trent to Dinah and Thomas Mulock and raised in Newcastle-under-Lyme, Staffordshire, where her father was minister of a small independent nonconformist congregation. Her childhood and early youth were affected by her father's mental health and his unsettled fortunes, but she gained a good education from various quarters and felt called to be a writer. In 1839 she was in London assisting her mother and studying design and languages. Her mother died in 1845 and her father lost interest in his children.

She was still in London in 1846, at the same time as two friends, Alexander Macmillan and Charles Edward Mudie. Introduced by Camilla Toulmin to Westland Marston, she rapidly made friends in London and found great encouragement for her stories for the young. In 1849 her emotional first novel, The Ogilvies, was published.

In 1865, she married George Lillie Craik, who soon became a partner with Alexander Macmillan in the publishers Macmillan & Company, and nephew of George Lillie Craik. They adopted a local foundling baby girl, Dorothy, in 1869.

At Shortlands, near Bromley, Kent, while preparing for Dorothy's wedding, Craik died of heart failure on 12 October 1887, aged 61. Her last words were said to have been: "Oh, if I could live four weeks longer! but no matter, no matter!" Her final book, An Unknown Country, appeared with Macmillan in 1887, the year of her death. Dorothy married Alexander Pilkington in 1887, but they divorced in 1911 and she later married Captain Richards of Macmine Castle. She and Alexander had a son, John Mulock Pilkington. He married Freda Roskelly and had a son and daughter with her.

== Works ==
Mulock's early success began with the novel Cola Monti (1849). In the same year she produced her first three-volume novel, The Ogilvies, to great success. It was followed in 1850 by Olive, then by The Head of the Family in 1851 and Agatha's Husband in 1852, in which the author used her recollections of East Dorset. Mulock published the fairy story Alice Learmont in 1852, and collected numerous short stories from periodicals under the title of Avillion and other Tales in 1853. A similar collection appeared in 1857 under the title Nothing New.

Well established in public favour as an author, Mulock took a cottage at Wildwood, North End, Hampstead and joined an extensive social circle. Her personal attractions were considerable at the time; people kindly ascribed to her simple cordiality, staunch friendliness and thorough goodness of heart. In 1857 she published the work by which she is mainly remembered, John Halifax, Gentleman, a presentation of the ideals of English middle-class life. Mulock's next important work, A Life for a Life (1859), made more money and was perhaps more widely read than John Halifax at the time. It was followed by Mistress and Maid (1863) and Christian's Mistake (1865), and by didactic works such as A Woman's Thoughts about Women and Sermons out of Church. Another collection, The Unkind Word and Other Stories, included a scathing criticism of Benjamin Heath Malkin for overworking his son Thomas, a child prodigy who died at the age of seven. Craik criticizes Malkin for acceding to Thomas's requests to be educated at an early age, believing it contributed to his death, but also admits that Malkin's other sons did well in life. Later Craik returned to more fanciful tales and achieved success with The Little Lame Prince (1874). In 1881 she published a collection of earlier poems entitled Poems of Thirty Years, New and Old; some, such as Philip my King were addressed to her godson Philip Bourke Marston. "Douglas, Douglas, Tender and True" achieved wide popularity.

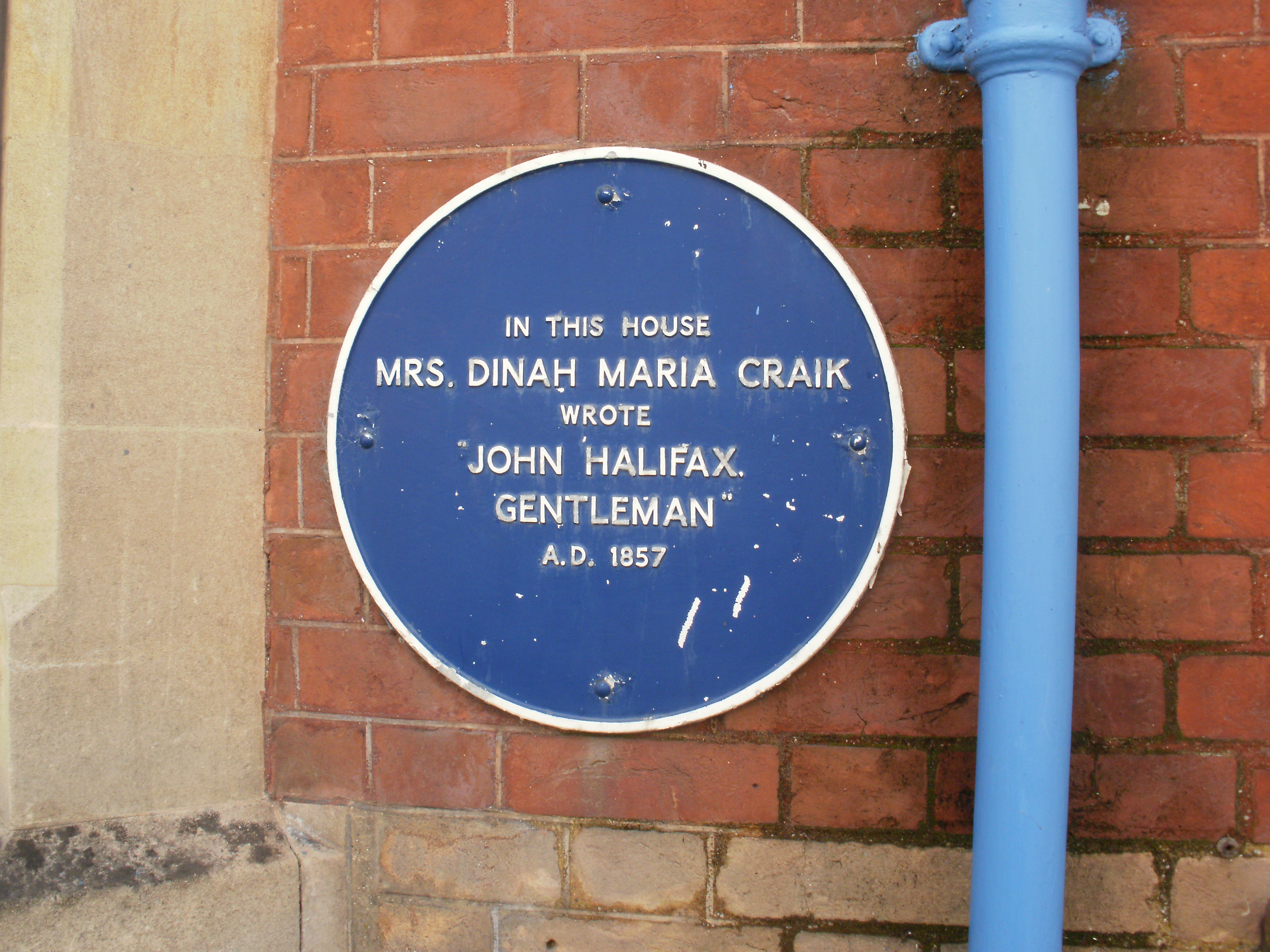
Blue plaque, North Street, Wareham, Dorset where Mrs. Craik wrote John Halifax Gentleman

== Reception ==
Richard Garnett holds that "the genuine passion that filled her early works of fiction had not unnaturally faded out of middle life," to be replaced by didacticism and an increase in self-awareness. Garnett judges Craik's poetry as "a woman's poems, tender, domestic, and sometimes enthusiastic, always genuine song, and the product of real feeling."

American composer Emily Bruce Roelofson used Craik's text for her song "O Heart, My Heart".

== Bibliography ==
A comprehensive bibliography appears in Dinah Mulock Craik by Sally Mitchell. This is reproduced more concisely in the Cambridge Bibliography of English Literature. Additional contributions to periodicals:

=== Tales and sketches ===
- "The Man in Green". 11 January 1846, in The Mirror Vol. 1, pp. 20–23
- "Beranger and his Poems". 1 August 1846, in The Mirror Vol. 1, pp. 79–80
- "The Poets of the People. I. Allan Ramsay". 15 August 1846, in The Mirror Vol. 1, pp. 109–11
- "The Poets of the People. II. Robert Burns". 19 September 1846, in The Mirror Vol. 1, pp. 189–90
- "The Emigrant's Wives. A Passage from Real Life". 26 September 1846, in The Mirror Vol. 1, pp. 203–08
- "The Story of Erminia". May 1847, in The New Monthly Belle Assemblée Vol. 26, pp. 284–86
- "Elspeth Sutherland (A Tale)". June 1847, in The New Monthly Belle Assemblée Vol. 26, pp. 327–32
- "Great and Little Heroines". September 1847, in The New Monthly Belle Assemblée Vol. 27, pp. 140–44
- "A Sketch of Domestic Life. (From the German of Heinrich Zebokke.)" 11, 18 and 25 September 1847, in Sharpe's London Magazine Vol. 4, pp. 315–17, 332–34 and 342–44
- "The Peace-Maker". February 1848, in The New Monthly Belle Assemblée Vol. 28, pp. 66–71
- "Poets of the People—Robert Bloomfield". March 1848, in The New Monthly Belle Assemblée Vol. 28, pp. 172–73
- "A Meditation for the Times". February 1855, in Hogg's Instructor Vol. 4, p. 129
- "Running Away. A Schoolmaster's Story". December 1868, in Our Young Folks Vol. 4, Boston, pp. 734–43
- "In the Happy Valley". July 1869, in Our Young Folks Vol. 5, Boston, pp. 444–49
- "Le Boeuf Gras". December 1869, in Our Young Folks Vol. 5, Boston, pp. 825–31
- "In Bolton Woods". January 1871, in Our Young Folks Vol. 7, Boston, pp. 42–48

The following all first appeared in periodicals before book form:

- "Little Lizzie and the Fairies"; "Sunny Hair's Dream"; "The Young Ship-Carver"; "Arndt's Night Underground" – in The Playmate. A Pleasant Companion for Spare Hours, 1847–48.
- "A Family in Love", as "A Family on the Wing", in Chambers's Journal, 3 May 1856
- "A Garden Party", in Good Cheer, Christmas 1867
- "His Little Mother", in The Graphic, 5–19 October 1878
- "Poor Prin. A True Story", in The Graphic, 11 October 1879
- "An Island of the Blest", in The Sunday Magazine, 1880
- "My Sister’s Grapes", in Harper’s Young People, New York, 14 December 1880, and in Life and Work, August 1881
- "A Ruined Palace", in The Sunday Magazine, 1881
- "How She Told a Lie", in The Sunday Magazine, 1881
- "A City at Play" and "The First Sunday at Lent" were incorporated in the book Fair France. Impressions of a Traveller, as Chapters 3 and 4 respectively.

=== Early poems ===
- "Song of the Hours". October 1841, in The Dublin University Magazine Vol. 18, pp. 442–443
- "Verses". 1844, in Friendship's Offering of Sentiment and Mirth, pp. 216–217
- "A March Song". April 1844, in The New Monthly Belle Assemblée Vol. 20, p. 245
- Songs for Stray Airs No. I. "The Mourner's Hope of Immortality (A Funeral Hymn)". April 1844, in The New Monthly Belle Assemblée Vol. 20, p. 245
- Songs for Stray Airs No. II. "The Shepherd's Wife". May 1844, in The New Monthly Belle Assemblée Vol. 20, p. 275
- Songs for Stray Airs No. III. "Carolans War-Cry". June 1844, in The New Monthly Belle Assemblée Vol. 20, p. 335
- "Forgive One Another." June 1844, in The New Monthly Belle Assemblée Vol. 20, p. 346
- Songs for Stray Airs No. IV. "A Barcarole". July 1844, in The New Monthly Belle Assemblée Vol. 21, p. 32
- "Good Seed". 5 July 1845, in Chambers's Edinburgh Journal New Series Vol. 4, p. 16
- Songs for Stray Airs No. V. "Caoinne Over an Irish Chieftain". August 1844, in The New Monthly Belle Assemblée Vol. 21, p. 76
- "The Country Sabbath". August 1844, in The New Monthly Belle Assemblée Vol. 21, p. 101
- Songs for Stray Airs No. VI. "A Fire-Side Song". September 1844, in The New Monthly Belle Assemblée Vol. 21, p. 168
- "The Six Maidens". January 1845, in The New Monthly Belle Assemblée Vol. 22, pp. 26–27
- "England's Welcome to American Genius". April 1845, in The New Monthly Belle Assemblée Vol. 21, p. 200
- "The Garden in the Churchyard". 20 September 1845, in Chambers's Edinburgh Journal New Series Vol. 4, p. 192
- "The Motherless Children". Addressed to the Infants left by Madame Leontine Genoude. (From the French of De Lamartine.) 18 October 1845, in Chambers's Edinburgh Journal New Series Vol. 4, p. 256
- "The Poet's Mission". 3 January 1846, in Chambers's Edinburgh Journal New Series Vol. 5, p. 16
- "Prayers for all Men". (From "Les Feuilles d'Automne" of Victor Hugo.) 31 January 1846, in Chambers's Edinburgh Journal New Series Vol. 5, p. 80
- "Hateful Spring!" (From the "Chansons" of Beranger.) 7 February 1846, in Chambers's Edinburgh Journal New Series Vol. 5, p. 96
- "The Maiden and the Rose". (From the French of Chateaubriand.) 7 March 1846, in Chambers's Edinburgh Journal New Series Vol. 5, p. 160
- "A Greek Allegory". 28 March 1846, in Chambers's Edinburgh Journal New Series Vol. 5, p. 208
- "The Troubadour and his Swallow". (From the French.) 11 April 1846, in Chambers's Edinburgh Journal New Series Vol. 5, p. 240
- "A Hymn". (From Lamartine's "Harmonies Poètiques.") 30 May 1846, in Chambers's Edinburgh Journal New Series Vol. 5, p. 352
- "The Water-Lily". 18 July 1846, in Chambers's Edinburgh Journal New Series Vol. 6, p. 48
- "A Mother's Resignation". 25 July 1846, in Chambers's Edinburgh Journal New Series Vol. 6, p. 64
- "The Chrysanthemum". 26 December 1846, in Chambers's Edinburgh Journal New Series Vol. 6, p. 416
- "Happiness". 30 January 1847, in Chambers's Edinburgh Journal New Series Vol. 7, p. 80
- "Robert Bruce Crowned by the Countess of Buchan". 13 February 1847, in Chambers's Edinburgh Journal New Series Vol. 7, p. 112
- "The Cry of the Earth". 22 May 1847, in Chambers's Edinburgh Journal New Series Vol. 7, p. 336
- "On the Portrait of Lady Rachel Russell". July 1847, in The New Monthly Belle Assemblée Vol. 27, frontispiece
- "An Answer". July 1847, in The New Monthly Belle Assemblée Vol. 27, p. 22
- "The Golden Rose". 10 July 1847, in Chambers's Edinburgh Journal New Series Vol. 8, p. 32
- "Growing Old Together". 21 August 1847, in Chambers's Edinburgh Journal New Series Vol. 8, p. 128
- "Memory". 30 October 1847, in Chambers's Edinburgh Journal New Series Vol. 8, p. 288
- "The Tax-Gatherers". (From the French of Béranger.) November 1847, in The New Monthly Belle Assemblée Vol. 27, p. 265
- "The Dream of the Orphan". 1847, in Orphanhood. Free-will offerings to the Fatherless, pp. 81–82
- "Dante's Meeting with Casello in Purgatory". (From "Il Purgatorio"—Canto II.) January 1848, in The New Monthly Belle Assemblée Vol. 28, pp. 25–26
- "The African Slave"; "The Greek Mother"; "The Battle of Langsyde"; and three other unknown poems. December 1848, in The Drawing-Room Table-Book. An Annual for Christmas and the New Year, pp. 13, 34 and 76
- "Militia Volunteers". March 1855, in Hogg's Instructor Vol. 4, p. 240
