= John Halifax, Gentleman =

1856 novel by Dinah Craik

- First editions
- Author: Dinah Craik
- Language: English
- Publisher: Hurst and Blackett
- Publication date: 1856
- Publication place: Great Britain
- Media type: Print

John Halifax, Gentleman is a novel by Dinah Craik, first published in 1856. Through hard work, the protagonist becomes a successful industrialist. The novel is set in the context of Britain's Industrial Revolution.

The book sold well in the 19th century. In the 20th century it was adapted for film and television.

== Location ==
Dinah Craik grew up in an industrial conurbation, the Potteries district of Staffordshire. However, the plot of the novel revolves around Tewkesbury in Gloucestershire, a town which she visited but never lived in. While Tewkesbury was not heavily industrialised, there are mills such as Abbey Mill, dated 1793, which supposedly features in the book along with other prominent buildings.

A memorial to Dinah Craik was erected in Tewkesbury Abbey.

A photographic postcard, probably from the early 20th century, depicts Dunkirk Mills, Inchbrook, near Nailsworth and Stroud, Gloucestershire, stating it was the "original Mills of 'John Halifax Gentleman'".

A discussion on a Stroud Fakebook [sic] page suggests that Enderley and the cottage were modelled on an area near Avening.

== Plot summary ==
The story is narrated by Phineas, a friend of the central character. John Halifax is an orphan, determined to make his way in the world through honest hard work. He is taken in by a tanner, Abel Fletcher, who is a Quaker, and thus meets Phineas, who is Abel's son. John eventually achieves success in business and love, and becomes a wealthy man.

== Editions ==
The novel was first published by Hurst and Blackett. It has been published in dozens of editions and translated into various languages.

An illustrated edition was published by J. M. Dent & Co. in 1898, with twelve colour plates by three artists: W. C. (Cubitt) Cooke. L. M. (Laura) Fisher and F. C. (Frederick Colin) Tilney.

== Adaptations ==
The novel has been adapted several times. A 1915 silent film John Halifax, Gentleman was directed by George Pearson. In 1938 a film version John Halifax was made.

The novel was adapted for BBC Radio 4 in 1970. In 1974 a BBC television series John Halifax, Gentleman was made starring Robert Coleby.

== In popular culture ==
The books appears to have been awarded frequently as a prize by Sunday Schools.

The book is mentioned in Agatha Christie's 1935 novel Why Didn't They Ask Evans?.

The book is mentioned in the first Elinor Brent-Dyer’s Chalet School series, “The School at the Chalet”, as being read three times consecutively by central character, Jo Bettany.

In the 1967-68 Granada TV series "Mr Rose", Charles Rose's manservant adopted the name "John Halifax" from the novel on his release from prison. It later emerges that he was previously Rose's sergeant when they were both police officers.
