= 1839 in music =

This article is about music-related events in 1839.

== Events ==
- March 21 – Felix Mendelssohn conducts the first known public performance of Franz Schubert's Symphony No. 9 in C Major ("The Great"; completed 1826), posthumously, in Leipzig.
- November 17 – Giuseppe Verdi's first opera, Oberto, Conte di San Bonifacio, opens at La Scala, Milan.

== Classical music ==
- Hector Berlioz – Romeo et Juliette
- Frédéric Chopin
  - Ballade No. 2
  - Scherzo No. 3
  - Piano Sonata No. 2
- Mikhail Glinka
  - La séparation
  - Polonaise
  - Valse-Fantasie
- Johann Nepomuk Hummel – 2 Preludes and Fugue for Organ (published posthumously)
- Joseph Lanner – Amazonen-Galopp; Malapou Galop
- Franz Liszt
  - Valse mélancolique, S.210
  - Angiolin dal biondo crin, S.269
  - Fantaisie sur des motifs favoris de l'opéra 'La sonnambula', S.393
- Felix Mendelssohn
  - 6 Gesänge, Op. 47
  - Piano Trio No. 1 in D Minor, Op. 49
  - "Liebe und Wein"
- Robert Schumann:
  - Arabesque in C, Op. 18
  - Blumenstück (Flower Piece) in D♭, Op. 19
  - Humoreske in B♭, Op. 20
  - 4 Nachtstücke (Night Pieces), Op. 23
  - Faschingsschwank aus Wien, Op. 26
  - 3 Romances, Op. 28 (B♭ minor, F♯, B)
- Louis Spohr – Concerto for Violin no 14 in A minor, Op. 110 "Sonst und Jetzt"

== Opera ==
- Alexander Dargomyzhsky – Esmeralda
- Gaetano Donizetti
  - L'Ange de Nisida
  - Il duca d'Alba (composed, premiered 1882)
- Giuseppe Lillo – Il conte di Chalais
- Giuseppe Verdi – Oberto, Conte di San Bonifacio

== Published popular music ==
- "Kathleen Mavourneen" w. Annie Barry Crawford m. Frederick William Nicholls Crouch

== Births ==
- January 1 – James Ryder Randall, popular songwriter
- January 9 – John Knowles Paine, composer and musicologist
- February 7 – Elie Miriam Delaborde, editor and pianist (died 1913)
- April 18 – Lotten Edholm, composer
- March 2 – Victoria Bundsen, alto
- March 10 – Dudley Buck, American composer and organist
- March 17 – Josef Rheinberger, composer (d. 1901)
- March 19 – Gustav Roguski, composer and teacher of Mieczysław Karłowicz
- March 21 – Modest Mussorgsky, composer (d. 1881)
- April 12 – Victorin de Joncières, composer and music critic (d. 1903)
- May 19 – Alice Mary Smith, composer (d. 1884)
- July 14 – Sydney Smith, English composer and pianist
- August 24 – Eduard Nápravník, composer (d. 1916)
- November 24 – James Warren York, businessman, musical instrument maker

== Deaths ==
- February 16 – Ludwig Berger, pianist, composer and music teacher (b. 1777)
- March 8 – Adolphe Nourrit, operatic tenor (b. 1802) (suicide)
- April 20 – Giuseppe Rossini, father of the composer Gioacchino Rossini
- May 3 – Ferdinando Paer, composer (b. 1771)
- June 8 – Aloysia Weber, operatic soprano (b. c. 1760)
- June 11 – Regina Strinasacchi, violinist (b. c. 1761)
- June 14 – Nicolas Mori, violinist, conductor and music publisher (b. 1796)
- June 15 – Hans Skramstad, pianist and composer (b. 1797)
- July 10 – Fernando Sor, guitarist and composer (b. 1778)
- September 21 – Gottfried Weber, music theorist (b. 1779)
- December 7 – Jan August Vitásek, composer (b. 1770)

== Awards ==
- Prix de Rome – Charles Gounod
