= Kathleen Mavourneen (1919 film) =

1919 film by Charles Brabin

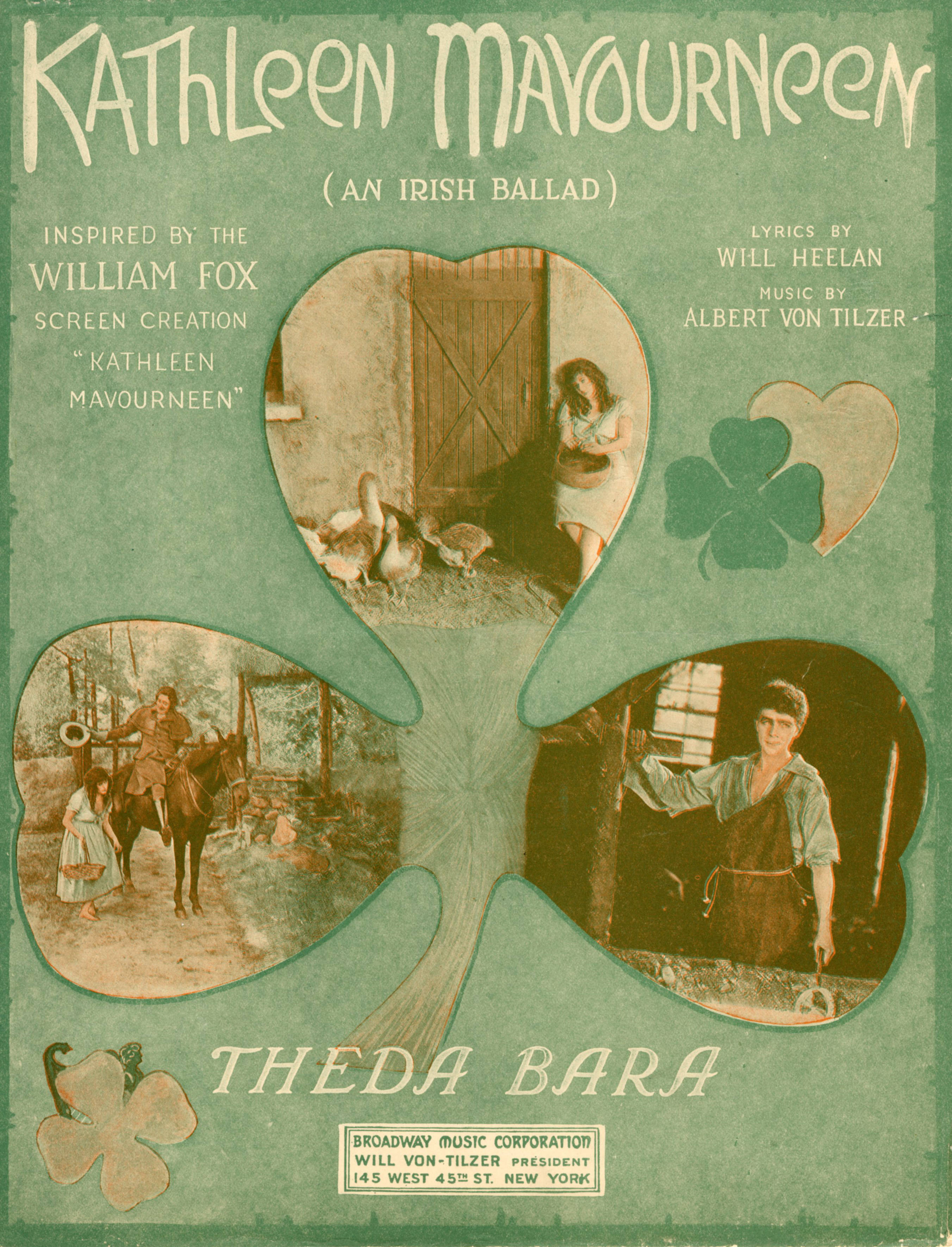
- sheet music cover
- Directed by: Charles J. Brabin
- Written by: Charles Brabin
- Based on: poem and song Kathleen Mavourneen by Annie Crawford and Frederick Williams Nichols Crouch, and play Kathleen Mavourneen by Dion Boucicault
- Produced by: William Fox
- Cinematography: Richard Maedler
- Distributed by: Fox Film Corporation
- Release date: August 19, 1919
- Running time: 60 minutes
- Country: United States
- Language: Silent (English intertitles)

Kathleen Mavourneen is a lost 1919 American silent drama film directed by Charles J. Brabin and starring his wife Theda Bara. It was produced and distributed by Fox Film Corporation. A much filmed story based on the poem, Kathleen Mavourneen, by Annie Crawford and play by Dion Boucicault.

== Plot ==
As described in a film magazine, Kathleen (Bara) and Terence (McKee), Irish peasants, plan their wedding in anticipation of a lifetime of happiness.

Their dreams are shattered by The Squire of Traise (McDermott), who is attracted to Kathleen's beauty, and she is placed into a forced marriage to him. A while later, The Squire meets Lady Clancarthy (Harris), who possesses vast estates and funds. The Squire of Traise is convinced that he can win Lady Clancarthy and her fortune if he were free of Kathleen.

The Squire of Traise lures Kathleen to a lonely spot in the woods and leaves her. After being deserted by her husband, she is set upon by bandits, and rescued only by the timely arrival of Terence, who kills one of her assailants.

In a twist, Terence is arrested, tried and found guilty. The mounting evidence supports the theory that he lured Kathleen into the woods for a foul purpose and then killed the man who came to her rescue. Terence ultimately pays the death penalty on the gallows — whereupon Kathleen wakes up to find it was all a dream, and preparations for the wedding to Terence follow.

== Cast ==
- Theda Bara as Kathleen Mavourneen
- Edward O'Connor as Kathleen's father
- Jennie Dickerson as Kathleen's mother
- Raymond McKee as Terence O'Moore
- Marc McDermott as The Squire of Traise
- Marcia Harris as Lady Clancarthy
- Henry Hallam as Sir John Clancarthy
- Harry Gripp as Denis O'Rourke
- Morgan Thorpe as Father O'Flynn

== See also ==
- 1937 Fox vault fire
