= The "Mind the Paint" Girl =

Sheet music cover with Billie Burke

The "Mind the Paint" Girl is a four-act play by Arthur Pinero, first published in 1912.

The play has a large cast of twenty eight named characters. The play was written to incorporate a song written by Jerome Kern. It premiered at the Duke of York's Theatre, London, in February 1912.

A film based on the play was made by director Wilfrid North in 1919, but it is considered lost.
