= Hattie Delaro =

American actress

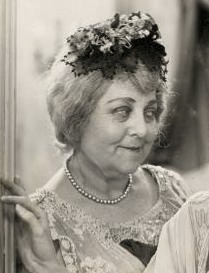
- publicity still from The-Mind-the-Paint Girl (1919)
- Born: 1861; Brooklyn, New York, U.S.
- Died: April 18, 1941 (age 80); New York, U.S.
- Occupation: Actress
- Years active: 1913–1926
- Spouse: William S. Barnes

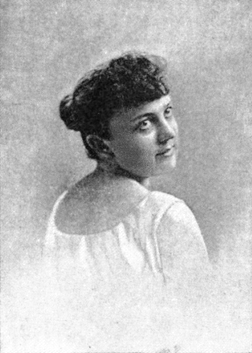
Hattie Delaro (1889)

Hattie Delaro (1861 – April 18, 1941) was an American actress. She had a career in theater, then became an actress in silent film in the 1910s and 1920s.

Delaro was born in Brooklyn.

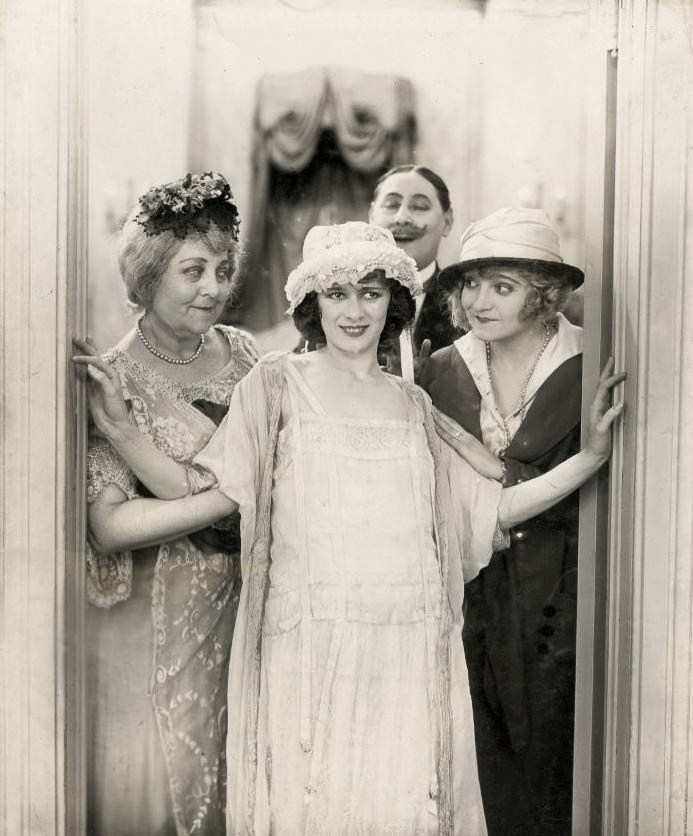
Templar Saxe (rear) with left to right: Hattie Delaro, Anita Stewart and Gladys Valerie. The Mind the Paint Girl (1919)

Delaro debuted on stage in 1881 at Brooklyn's Grand Opera House "in a repertory of comic operas". She portrayed Melissa in the first authorized New York production of Gilbert and Sullivan's Princess Ida in 1884 and an 1885 production of The Mikado at Hollis Street Theatre in Boston, Massachusetts. In 1888, she was in the production The Queen's Mate. Her other Broadway credits included The Pearl of Pekin (1889), Mam'selle 'Awkins (1900), and Babes in Toyland (1903).

She began her film career in 1913 short film Love in an Apartment Hotel.

Delaro was married to attorney William S. Barnes. She died on April 18, 1941, in New York at age 80.

== Filmography ==
- Love in an Apartment Hotel (short film, 1913)
- For Better or for Worse (short film, 1913)
- The Hoodoo Pearls (short film, 1913)
- The Van Nostrand Tiara (short film, 1913) as Mrs. Van Nostrand (credited as Hattie Barnes)
- The Master of the Strong (short film, 1914) as Mrs. Shelby
- Men and Women (short film, 1914) as Will and Dora's Mother
- Uncle Tom's Cabin (1914)
- The Pit (1914) as Mrs. Cressler
- The Reward (short film, 1915)
- Lillian's Husbands (short film, 1915, credited as Hattie De Laro)
- For the Honor of the Crew (short film, 1915) as Viola's Mother
- The Heights of Hazard (1915) Mrs. Martindale (as credited Hattie de Lara)
- The Little Lady Across the Way (short film, 1915) as Jane's Aunt
- Almost a Papa (short film, 1915) as Mother
- Kennedy Square (1916) as Mrs. Rutter
- Gold and the Woman (1916) as Nurse
- The Eternal Sappho (1916) as Mrs. Marvin, Sr.
- The Scarlet Runner (1916) (credited as Hattie De Laro)
- The Awakening of Helena Richie (1916) as Mrs. King
- He Never Touched Me (short film, 1917) as The Wife's Strong-Jawed Mother
- Sloth (1917) as Sally's Mother
- A Night in New Arabia (1917) as Henrietta
- The Seven Deadly Sins (1917) as Sally's Mother (Sloth)
- Marriage (1918) as Mrs. Van Alstyne (credited as Hattie Delaro Barnes)
- False Gods (1919) as Mrs. Burden
- The Mind-the-Paint Girl (1919) as Mrs. Upjohn
- Human Desire (1919) as Miss March
- April Folly (1920) as Mrs. Stanislaw
- You Find It Everywhere (1921) as Mrs. Simpson
- Cardigan (1922) as Lady Shelton
- The Ragged Edge (1923) as Mrs. Dalby
- Janice Meredith (1924) as Mrs. Meredith
- The Highbinders (1926) as Mrs. Briggs
