= Freedom of the Press (film) =

1928 American silent mystery film

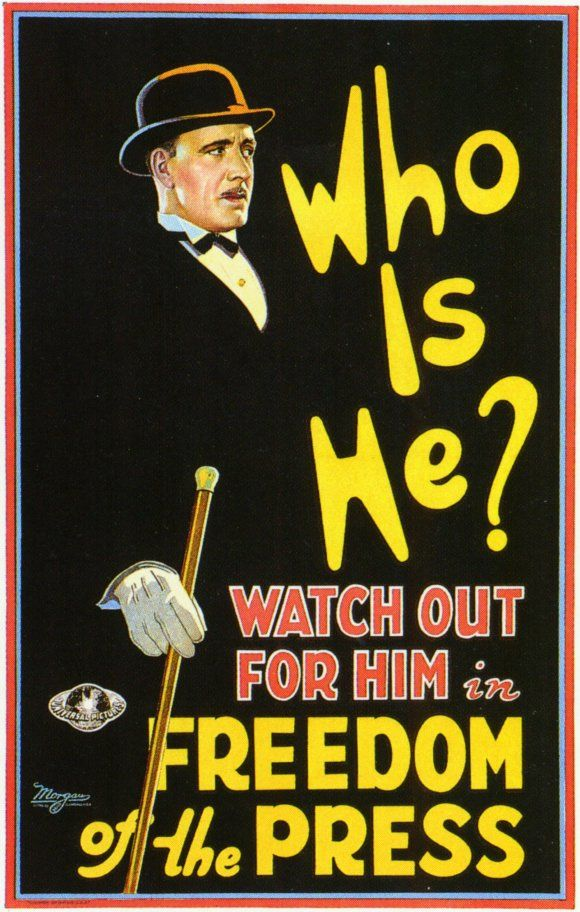
- Directed by: George Melford
- Written by: J. Grubb Alexander; Walter Anthony (intertitles); Curtis Benton; J.G. Hawks
- Story by: Peter B. Kyne
- Produced by: Carl Laemmle
- Starring: Lewis Stone; Marceline Day; Malcolm McGregor
- Cinematography: Ben F. Reynolds
- Edited by: George McGuire
- Production company: Universal Pictures
- Distributed by: Universal Pictures
- Release date: October 28, 1928
- Running time: 7 reels
- Country: United States
- Language: Silent (English intertitles)

Freedom of the Press is a 1928 American silent mystery film directed by George Melford and starring Lewis Stone, Marceline Day, and Malcolm McGregor.

== Plot ==
When a newspaper owner is murdered, his son takes over his crusade against a corrupt politician with criminal associations.

== Cast ==
- Lewis Stone as Daniel Steele
- Marceline Day as June Westcott
- Malcolm McGregor as Bill Ballard
- Henry B. Walthall as John Ballard
- Robert Emmett O'Connor as Boss Maloney
- Tom Ricketts as Wicks
- Hayden Stevenson as Callahan
- Robert Ellis as Cyrus Hazlett
- Boris Baronoff as Criminal
- Morgan Thorpe as Organist
- Evelyn Selbie as Italian Mother
- Bernard Siegel as Italian Father
- Wilson Benge as Butler

== Production ==
The plot of the Peter B. Kyne story and the film are based upon the murder of Don Mellett, a newspaper editor who crusaded against corruption in Canton, Ohio. An early version of the film had a private screening at the Capitol Theatre in Atlanta, Georgia, on April 15, 1928, in connection with an Associated Press convention.

== Preservation ==
A print of Freedom of the Press is listed in the collection of Cineteca Nazionale in Rome.

== Bibliography ==
- Munden, Kenneth White. The American Film Institute Catalog of Motion Pictures Produced in the United States, Part 1. University of California Press, 1997.
