= Salvation Joan =

- Directed by: Wilfrid North
- Written by: Marguerite Bertsch
- Produced by: Vitagraph Company of America
- Starring: Edna May
- Cinematography: Thomas F. Malloy
- Distributed by: V-L-S-E Inc. (Blue Ribbon)
- Release date: April 10, 1916
- Running time: 7 reels
- Country: USA
- Language: Silent..English titles

Salvation Joan is a lost 1916 silent film directed by Wilfrid North and starring Edna May. It was produced by the Vitagraph Company of America and released by V-L-S-E(Vitagraph, Lubin, Selig, Essanay). Though an original screen story, it bears a close resemblance to Edward Sheldon's Salvation Nell which was filmed several times.

== Cast ==
- Edna May - Joan Crawford
- Harry T. Morey - Bill, alias of John Hilton)
- Dorothy Kelly - Madeline Ellison
- Donald Hall - Robert Ellison
- Bobby Connelly - Bobby Ellison
- L. Rogers Lytton - Philip Ralston
- Eulalie Jensen
- Belle Bruce
