= The House of the Tolling Bell =

1920 film directed by J. Stuart Blackton

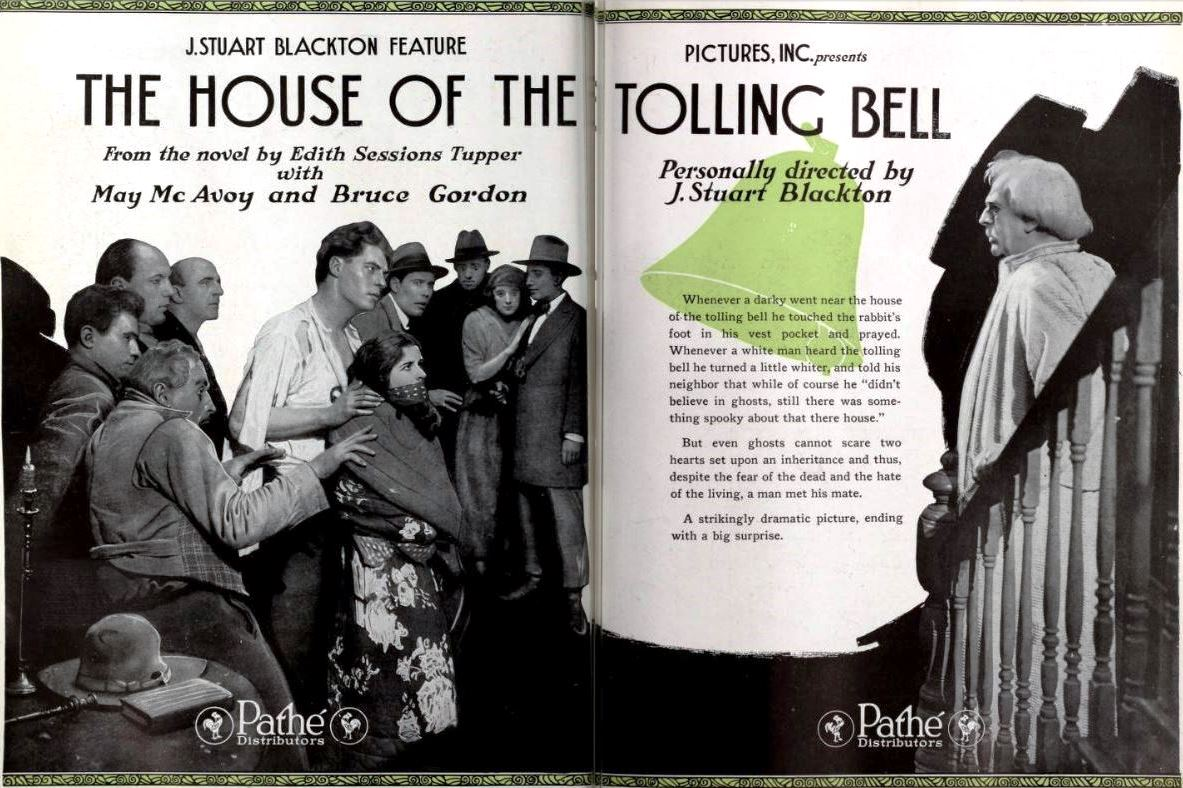
- Advertisement
- Directed by: J. Stuart Blackton
- Written by: Edith Sessions Tupper (novel)
- Produced by: J. Stuart Blackton
- Starring: May McAvoy; Bruce Gordon; Morgan Thorpe
- Cinematography: William S. Adams
- Production company: J. Stuart Blackton Feature Pictures
- Distributed by: Pathé Exchange
- Release date: September 5, 1920
- Running time: 6 reels
- Country: United States
- Language: Silent (English intertitles)

The House of the Tolling Bell is a 1920 American silent mystery film directed by J. Stuart Blackton and starring May McAvoy, Bruce Gordon, and Morgan Thorpe. It is based on a novel written by Edith Sessions Tupper.

== Cast ==
- May McAvoy as Lucy Atheron
- Bruce Gordon as Richard Steele
- Morgan Thorpe as Anthony Cole
- Edward Elkas as Innkeeper Ducros
- Eulalie Jensen as Lola
- William R. Dunn as Jules La Rocque
- Edna Young as Aunt Stella
- William Jenkins as Old George

== Bibliography ==
- Goble, Alan. The Complete Index to Literary Sources in Film. Walter de Gruyter, 1999.
