= The Mind the Paint Girl (film) =

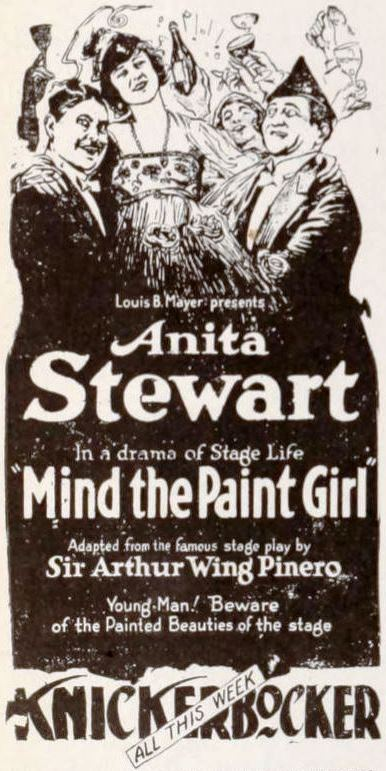
- Newspaper advertisement
- Directed by: Wilfrid North
- Based on: The "Mind the Paint" Girl by Arthur Wing Pinero
- Produced by: Anita Stewart Productions; Vitagraph Company of America; Albert E. Smith
- Starring: Anita Stewart
- Cinematography: John W. Brown
- Distributed by: First National Exhibitors
- Release date: November 10, 1919
- Running time: 60 minutes
- Country: United States
- Language: Silent (English intertitles)

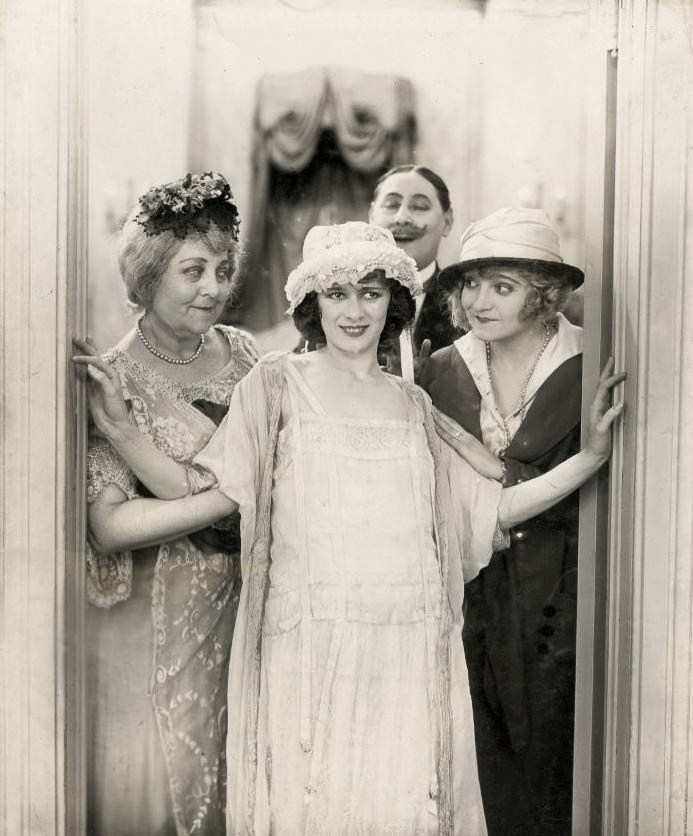
a scene with left to right: Hattie Delaro, Anita Stewart, Templar Saxe and Gladys Valerie

The Mind the Paint Girl is a 1919 American silent romantic drama film directed by Wilfrid North based upon the play of the same name by Arthur Wing Pinero and starring Anita Stewart. Stewart produced along with the Vitagraph Company and released through First National Exhibitors.

== Cast ==
- Anita Stewart as Lily Upjohn / Lily Parradell
- Conway Tearle as Capt. Nicholas Jeyes
- Vernon Steele as Lord Francombe (credited as Victor Steele)
- Templar Saxe as Lal Roper
- Arthur Donaldson as Vincent Bland
- Robert Lee Keeling as Col. The Hon. Arthur Stidulph
- Virginia Norden as Mrs. Arthur Stidulph
- Hattie Delaro as Mrs. Upjohn
- George Stewart as Bob
- Gladys Valerie as Jimmie Birch

== Preservation ==
With no listings of The Mind the Paint Girl in any film archives, it is considered to be a lost film.
