= Camille D'Arville =

Opera singer and vaudevillean (1863–1932)

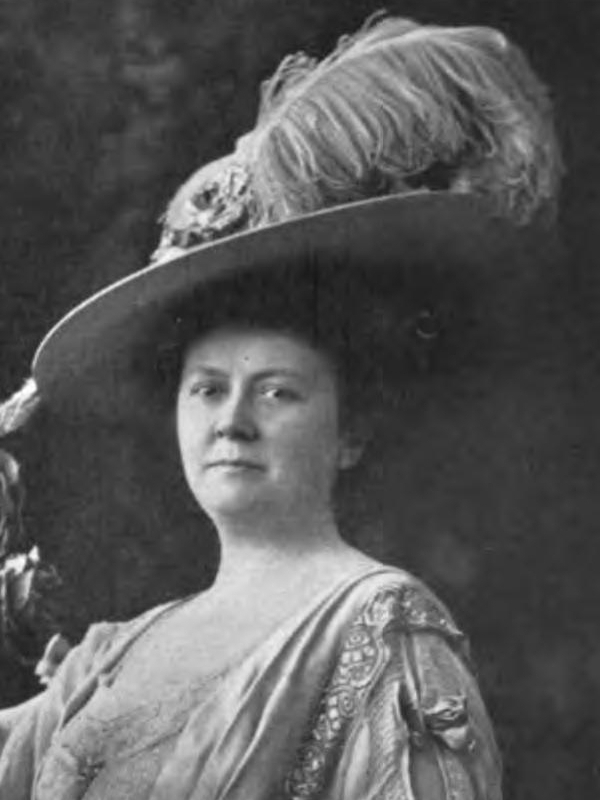
Camille D'Arville, detail from a 1909 publication.

Camille D'Arville (June 21, 1863 – September 9, 1932), born Cornelia "Neeltye" Dykstra, was a Dutch-born light opera singer and a vaudeville performer. She was a member of The Bostonians. (Her surname is also found as Darville, d'Arville, and D'arville.)

== Early life ==
Neeltye Dykstra was from the province of Overijssel the daughter of Cornelius Dykstra, a merchant. At the age of 12 she began her voice training in Amsterdam. There she made her concert debut at age 14, and pursued further training in Vienna. She changed her name to Camille D'Arville soon after her opera debut in London.

== Career ==
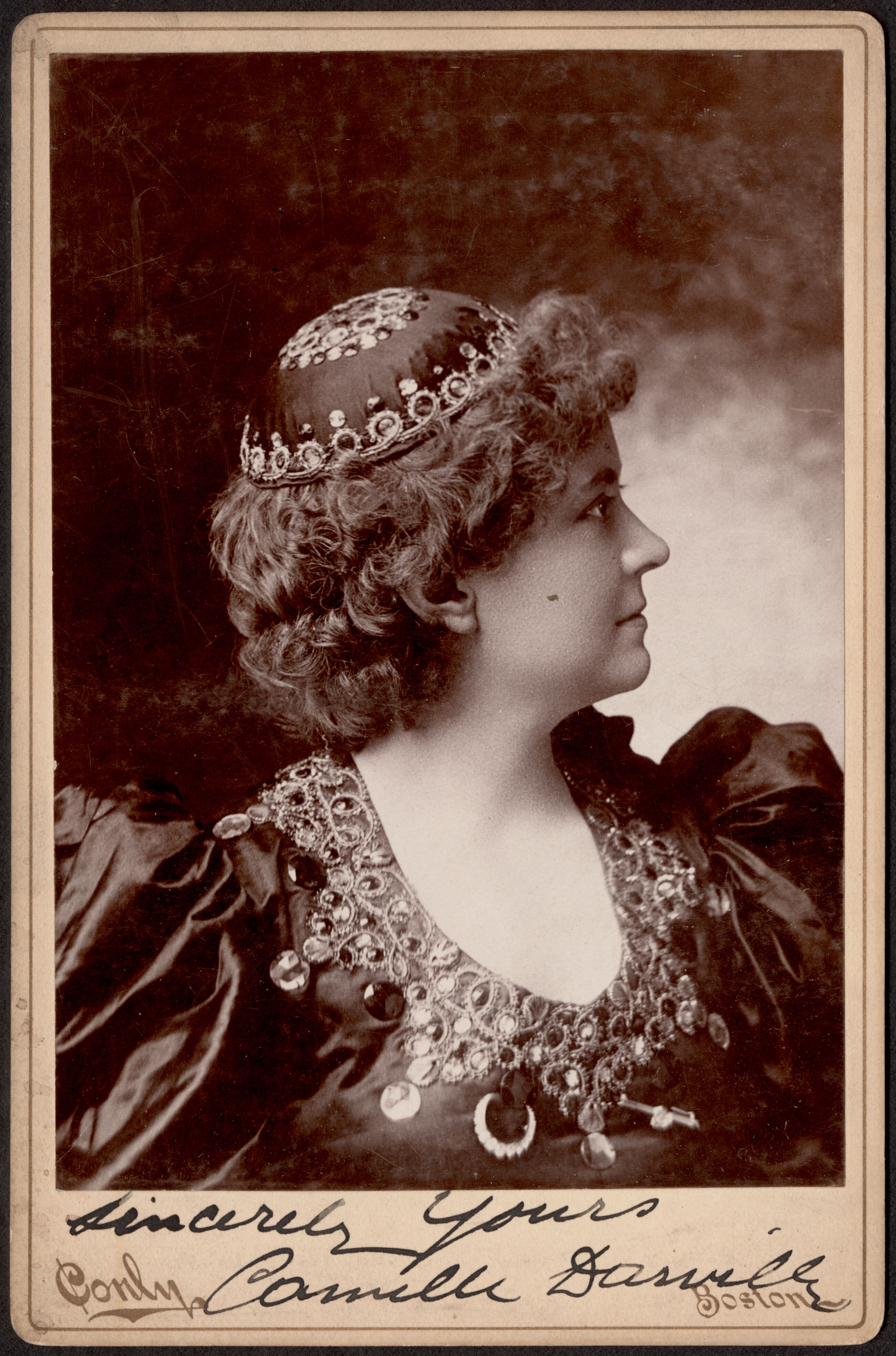
Sincerely yours Camille D'Arville, 1893; from the Philip Hale Collection of the Boston Public Library

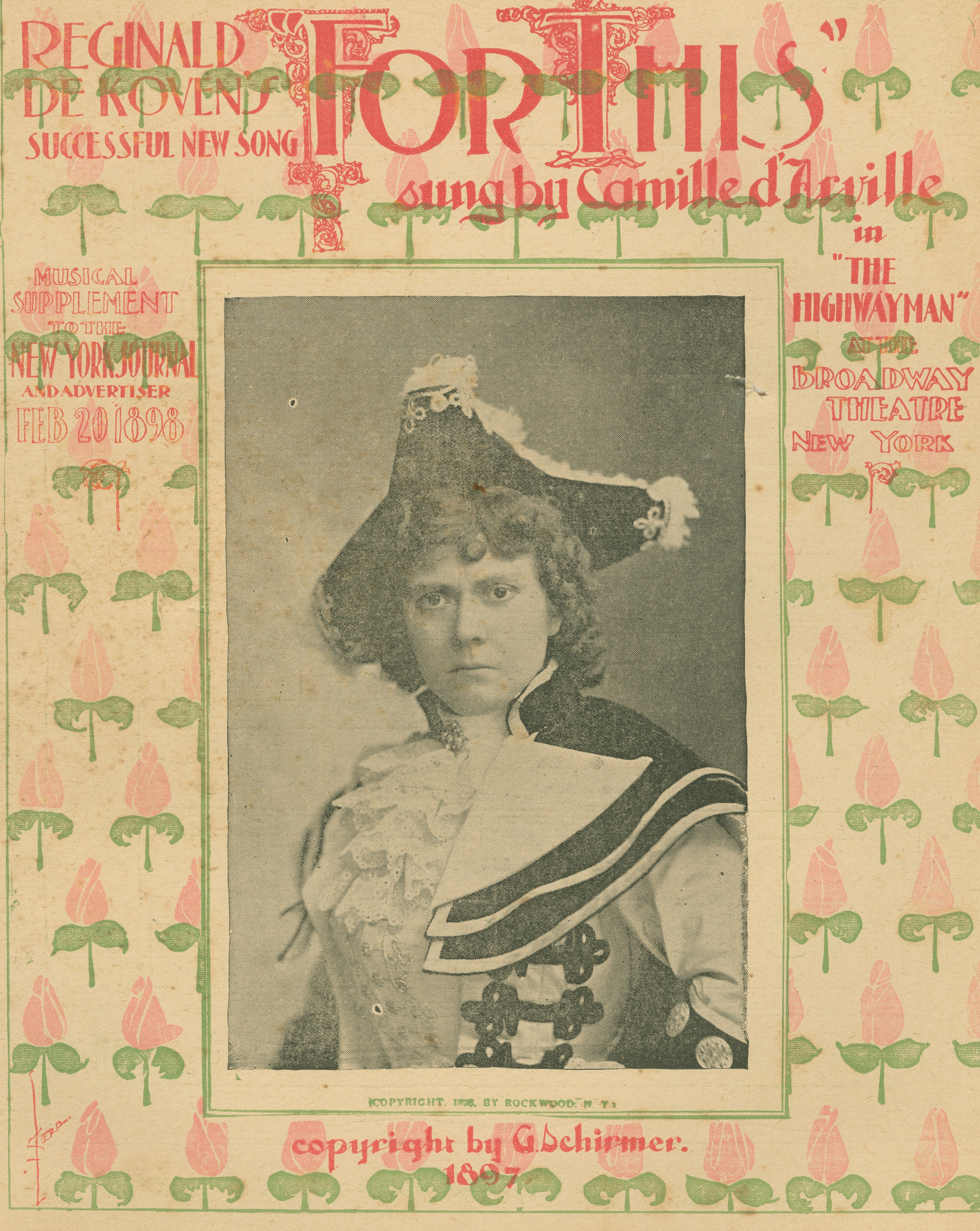
Sheet music featuring Camille D'Arville in cavalier costume, from the New York Public Library

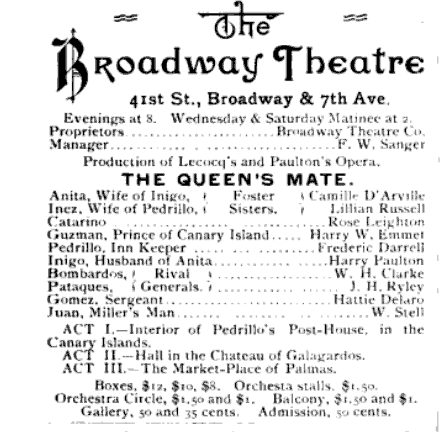
The Queens Mate, Broadway Theatre, The Theatre (1888), showing Camille D'Arville in the cast as the sister of Lillian Russell

In London D'Arville was associated with the Gaiety Theatre; she appeared in the shows La Vie, Chilperic, Rip Van Winkle, Falka, Mynheer Jan, Carina, and Cymbria, among others. She moved to the United States in 1888. Her stage appearances included roles in The Queen's Mate (1888), Venus (1893), Oscar Hammerstein I's Santa Maria (1896), The Belle of London Town (1907), A Daughter of the Revolution, The Bohemian Girl, Robin Hood, Madeleine, The Highwayman, and The Mascotte. She was associated with the Bostonians light opera company for some of these shows. She was known for "cavalier" parts, in which female characters were disguised in masculine hat, tunic, boots, and tights for part of the show."She wears a military costume which is charmingly becoming to her, also a short curly blond wig," one reviewer noted. In 1894, she headed the Camille D'Arville Light Opera Company. She retired from the stage after 1908, though she had announced an intention to retire after her second marriage as early as 1900, writing "I believe that any other woman who pursues a profession after her marriage makes a miserable failure of it."

Later in life, she worked behind the scenes with the Reginald Travers Company, as a financial patron and artistic advisor. She also purchased a large prune ranch near Los Gatos, California, in 1913. During World War I she was president of Stage Women's War Relief branch in San Francisco. She was also president of the San Francisco Light Opera Company.

== Personal life ==
Camille D'Arville married twice. Her first husband was Andrew Wilson Lyons, an acrobat. They married in 1879 and divorced in 1899. She married businessman Ernest Willard Crellin and lived in San Francisco, California in her later life. She died in 1932, aged 69 years, in San Francisco. She was survived by Crellin, by her son Louis Lyons Wilson, and by her sister Lena Dykstra.
