= Morgan Thorpe =

Morgan Thorpe was an actor in theater and film in the United States. He portrayed Favius in The Sign of the Cross and Anthony Cole in The House of the Tolling Bell.

Thorpe was in the theatrical production Cymbeline in 1906 as the "Frenchman".

He portrayed Clayton Walpole in the 1920 film Respectable by Proxy.

== Filmography ==
- The Last of the Hargrove (1914), short film
- Sign of the Cross (1914)
- The Better Man (1914)
- The Wolf of Debt (1915)
- A Tribute to Mother (1915), short film
- In the Name of the Law (1916)
- Daughter of Maryland (1917)
- The Last Sentence (1917)
- Kathleen Mavourneen (1919)
- The Great Romance
- The House of the Tolling Bell (1920)
- Respectable by Proxy (1920)
- The Rich Slave (1921)
- The Pilgrims (1924)
- Freedom of the Press (1928)
