= Edith Sessions Tupper =

American writer (1855–1927)

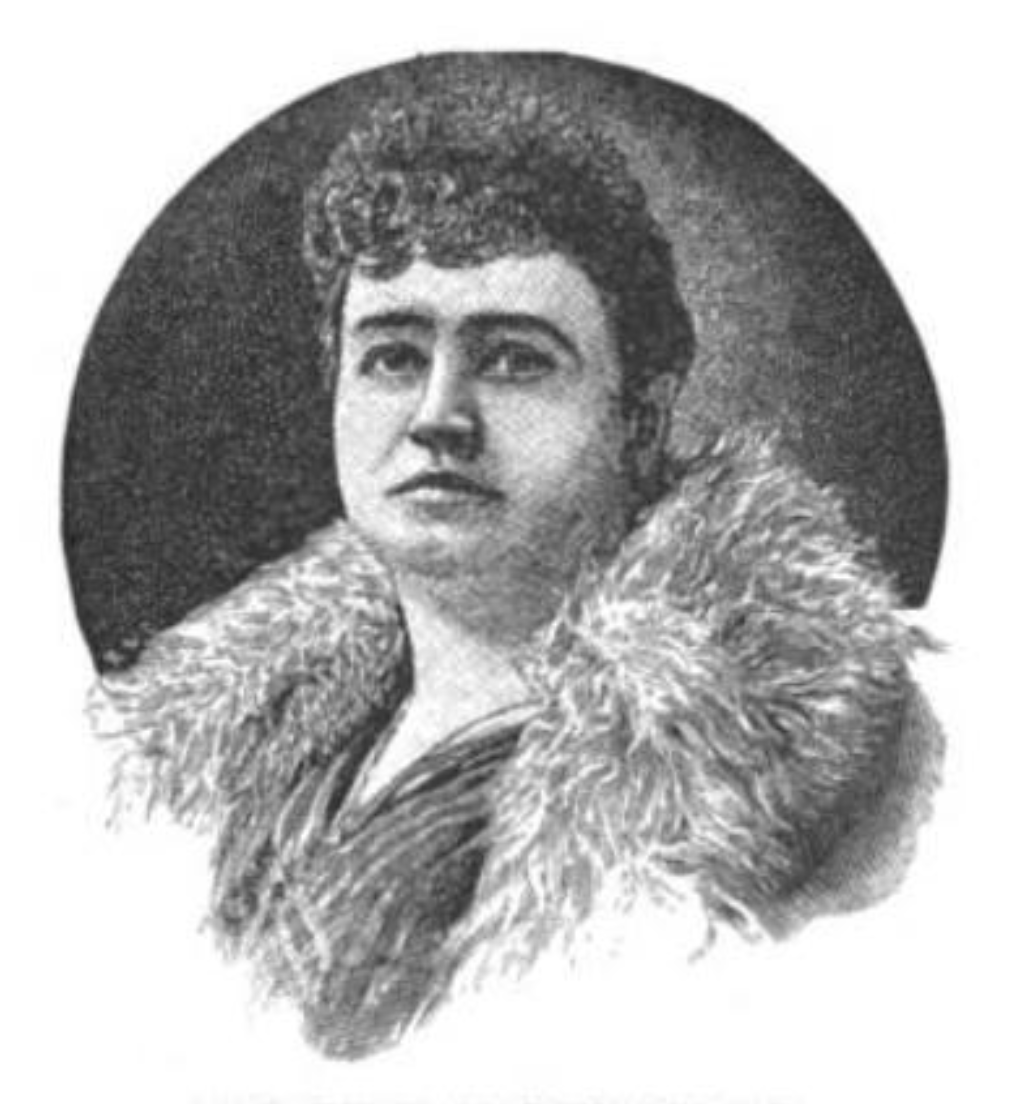
- Born: September 29, 1855; Panama
- Died: August 3, 1927 (aged 71); Fredonia
- Alma mater: Vassar College
- Parent(s): Walter L. Sessions

Edith Katharine Sessions Tupper (September 29, 1855 – August 3, 1927) was an American journalist, novelist, playwright, short story writer, and screenwriter.

Edith Katharine Sessions was born on September 29, 1855 in Panama, New York. She was the daughter of US Representative Walter L. Sessions. She married Horace E. Tupper, a railroad agent.

Her novels include the mysteries By a Hair's Breadth (1889) and By Whose Hand? (1889) and the historical novel Hearts Triumphant (1906), set in early 19th century Manhattan and featuring Aaron Burr.

Her play The Road to Arcady, a four act comedy, premiered at the Berkeley Theatre on November 25, 1912. It was adapted into film as the movie For Love of Money (1920) Two of her other works were adapted also for film: the haunted house movie The House of the Tolling Bell (1920) was based on her novel, possibly unpublished, by the same name, and Wilful Youth (1927) was based on her story "Whispering Pines". She was the screenwriter for a fifteen part serial, The Perils of Our Girl Reporters (1916).

Edith Sessions Tupper died on 3 August 1927 in Fredonia, New York.

== Filmography ==
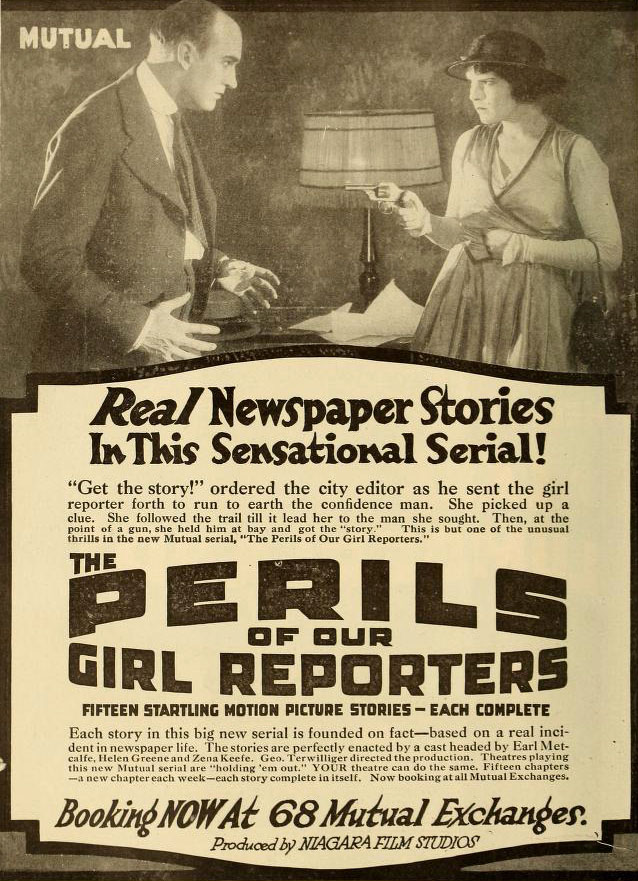
Perils of our Girl Reporters (1916)

=== Screenwriter ===
- The Perils of Our Girl Reporters (serial), Mutual Film, 1916
  1. The Jade Necklace
  2. The Black Door
  3. Ace High
  4. The White Trail
  5. Many a Slip
  6. The Long Lane
  7. The Smite of Conscience
  8. Birds of Prey
  9. Misjudged
  10. Taking Chances
  11. The Counterfeiters
  12. The Meeting
  13. Outwitted
  14. The Schemers
  15. Kidnapped

== Bibliography ==
- By a Hair's Breadth (1889)
- By Whose Hand? (1889)
- Hearts Triumphant (1906)
- The Stuff of Dreams (1908)
