= The Better Man (1914 film) =

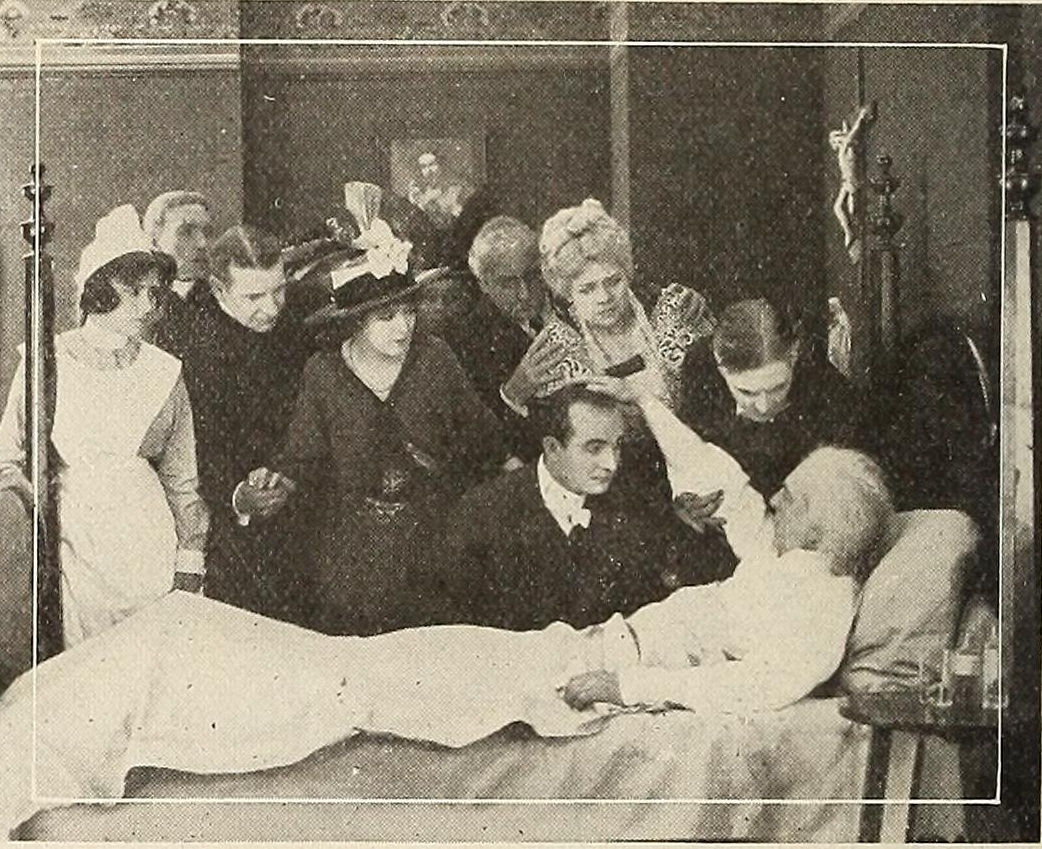
- Morgan Thorpe as the Bishop
- Directed by: William Powers
- Based on: a novel The Better Man by Cyrus Townsend Brady
- Produced by: Adolph Zukor
- Starring: William Courtleigh Jr. Arthur Hoops
- Production company: Famous Players Film Company
- Distributed by: State Rights
- Release date: August 10, 1914
- Running time: 4 reels
- Country: United States
- Language: Silent with English titles

The Better Man is a lost 1914 American silent drama film directed by William Powers and produced by Adolph Zukor. It was produced by the Famous Players Film Company and distributed on a State Rights basis.

== Plot ==
According to a film magazine, "The story is of two clergymen, one, the pompous and dignified rector of a millionaires' church whose life is society. The other, Mark Stebbing is a most conscientious worker among the poorer classes. The men are ready to enter upon their ministerial duties about the same time. There are two vacancies, Stebbing selecting the small parish in the slums while his friend, Barmore, is made rector of St. Hilda's, the church of the wealthy. The two are in love with the same girl, daughter of General Wharton, a multimillionaire traction king. The girl is a social worker herself, and wants to help Stebbing with his little church. She sends him a check for $5,000, which he declines, as some of the men of his parish are in the employ of her father, who refuses to give them a raise in salary and on which account they are forced to strike. He tries to secure the money demanded by the men, but is unsuccessful in his mission.

The love affair grows exciting. On one occasion the minister from the slums while visiting the young woman at her home feels he has won her and in a sudden fit of passion, takes her in his arms, smothering her with kisses. She is greatly enraged and calls in the other minister, who happens to be in the next room. She tells him of the actions of the other and he strikes a deadly blow at him, saying at the same time the girl is to be his wife, which she also admits. The strike at the plant of the General goes from bad to worse. It is at last decided to call out the militia to aid the strike breakers in running the cars. The Bishop of the Diocese (in which the two churches are located) dies. The young ministers find that they are rival candidates for the vacancy. The "wealthy" minister is backed by millions, while his less fortunate brother finds his friends are not very influential. The convention is held to elect the new bishop, and the honor of nominating Barmore is given to General Wharton. A parishioner of Stebbing makes his appearance at the convention and nominated the man who had done so much for the poor. Stebbing tells the assembly he will withdraw his nomination if General Wharton gives in to the demands of his employees.

The strike breakers hired to man the cars are repulsed by the strikers and a company of Infantry is called out to stop the trouble. Some toughs among the breakers, having received a beating by the strikers, decide to burn the cars and blame it on the other men. They set fire to an oil house and are about to escape when they find the Generals daughter and throw her into the burning building. A man who sees it rushes to the assembly and tells what has happened. Stebbing, who is there, runs to the burning building and carries out the girl, as the house is blown to atoms. He is frightfully burned and taken to the girl's house. Here he receives her consent to be his wife, as she terms him the better man. The other minister becomes Bishop. His opponent does not feel capable of filling the post, his work is among the poor and lowly."

== Cast ==
- William Courtleigh Jr. - Reverend Mark Stebbing
- Arthur Hoops - Reverend Lionel Barmore
- Alice Claire Elliott - Margaret Wharton
- Robert Broderick - Henry Wharton
- William R. Randall - Penrod
- Jack Henry - Clancy
- D. Hogan - Spike
- Morgan Thorpe - Bishop
- Albert S. Howson - Wharton's Secretary

== Reception ==
Motography gave the film a positive review, praising the performers for their excellence, saying "one could hardly wish for a more capable or well selected cast."

Motion Picture News reviewer J. Burroughs Noell gave the film a positive review, finding the cast to be excellent and the story to be "a daring and earnest protest against conditions as they are found in many of our churches."

Moving Picture World reviewer George Blaisdell gave the film a glowing review, praising Morgan Thorpe for his "splendid" performance as the Bishop and "great care" was taken in designing the interiors.
