= The Making Over of Geoffrey Manning =

1915 film by Harry Davenport

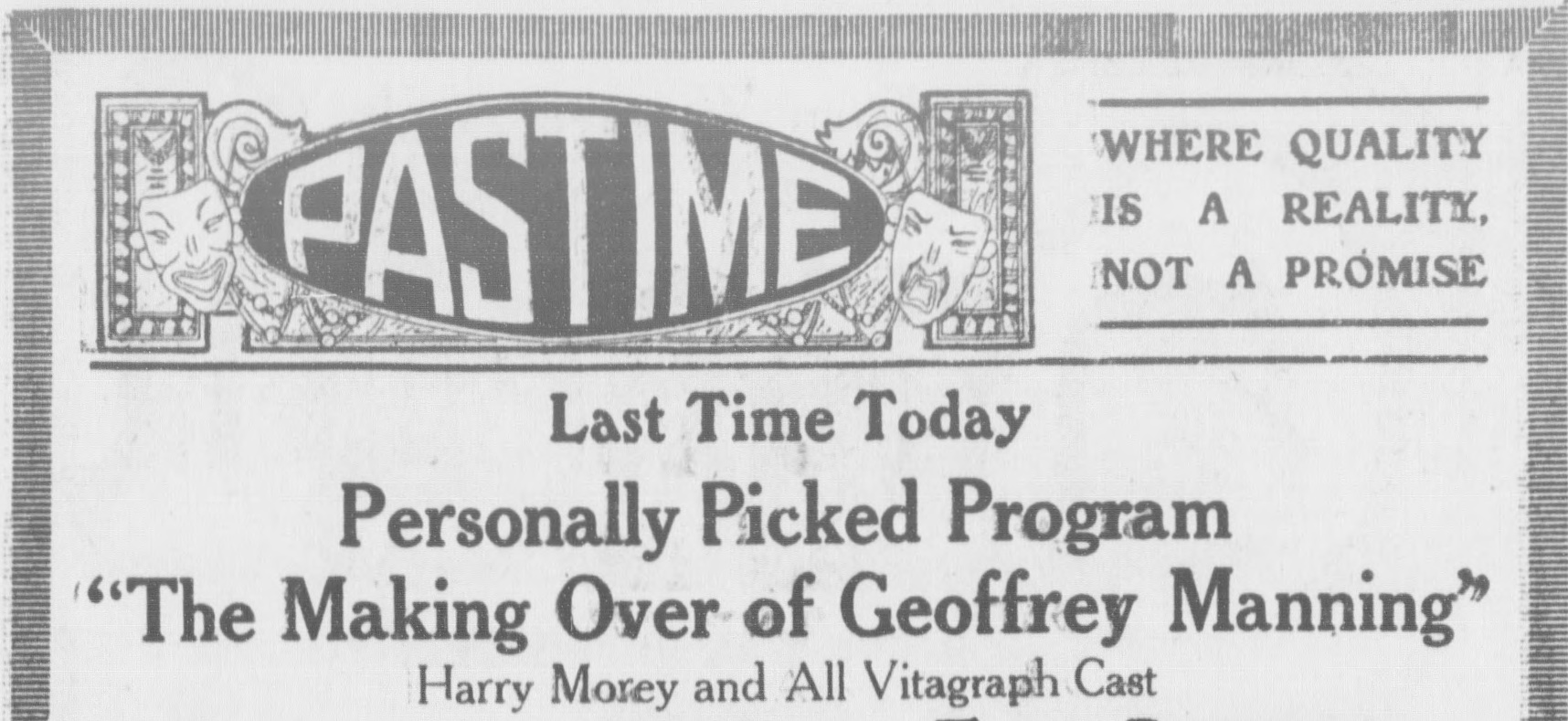
- Newspaper advertisement
- Directed by: Harry Davenport
- Written by: Charles T. Dazey (scenario); William Addison Lathrop (scenario)
- Story by: Everett McNeil
- Starring: Harry T. Morey; L. Rogers Lytton; Belle Bruce; Ned Finley; Logan Paul
- Production companies: Vitagraph Company of America; A Broadway Star Feature
- Distributed by: V-L-S-E
- Release date: December 27, 1915
- Running time: 4 reels
- Country: United States
- Languages: Silent film (English intertitles)

The Making Over of Geoffrey Manning is a 1915 American silent drama film directed by William P. S. Earle and starring Harry T. Morey, L. Rogers Lytton, Belle Bruce, Ned Finley, and Logan Paul. The film was released by V-L-S-E on December 27, 1915.

== Plot ==
A rich young man realizes he is not good at business, so he pretends to leave his home on a trip for fun. Instead he takes on work as a laborer, and through that faces a lot of hardship.

== Cast ==
- Harry T. Morey as Geoffrey Manning (as Harry Morey)
- L. Rogers Lytton as Geoffrey's Father
- Belle Bruce as Harmony Laurie
- Ned Finley as Foreman
- Logan Paul as Hennessey
- Kate Davenport as Maime
- Jack Brawn as Secretary
- Marion Henry as Margaret
- Eulalie Jensen as Mother
- Thomas R. Mills as Hogarty (as Thom Mills)
- Katherine Franek (uncredited)

== Preservation ==
The film is now considered lost.
