= L. Rogers Lytton =

American actor

Legare Rogers Lytton
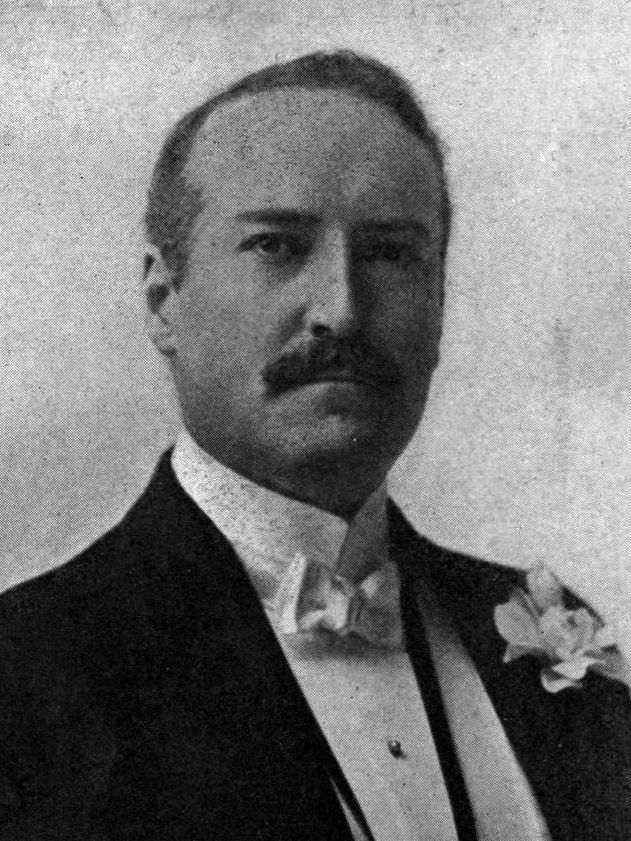
- Lytton in 1921
- Born: Oscar Legare Rogers; April 9, 1867; New Orleans, Louisiana, US
- Died: August 14, 1924 (aged 57); New York City, US
- Education: Columbia University
- Occupations: Actor, architect
- Years active: 1912–1924

Legare Rogers Lytton (born Oscar Legare Rogers; April 9, 1867 – August 14, 1924) was an American film actor of the silent era and an architect. He appeared in more than 90 films between 1912 and 1924. Prior to entering films he had a substantial stage career behind him.

Lytton was born in New Orleans, Louisiana, and graduated from Columbia University in 1889. After graduation, he worked several years for architect Stanford White. Leaving architecture, he went to Dobbs Ferry, New York, as head of a boys' school before he became an actor.

On Broadway, Rogers appeared in Service (1918), The Strugglers (1911), The Clouds (1911), Madame X (1910), Lincoln (1909), The Galloper (1906), The Sorceress (1904), Love's Pilgrimage (1904), and The Proud Prince (1903). When he turned to films, he acted for Vitagraph Studios.

On August 14, 1924, Lytton died in Bellevue Hospital in New York City.

Lytton's papers are housed at the New York Public Library.

== Selected filmography ==
- Mills of the Gods (1912)
- Red and White Roses (1913)
- Jerry's Mother-In-Law (1913)
- Beauty Unadorned (1913)
- My Official Wife (1914)
- Hearts and the Highway (1915)
- The Battle Cry of Peace (1915)
- The Making Over of Geoffrey Manning (1915)
- Mrs. Dane's Danger (1916)
- The Hero of Submarine D-2 (1916)
- Salvation Joan (1916)
- The Tarantula (1916)
- The Price of Fame (1916)
- The Scarlet Runner (1916)
- The On-the-Square Girl (1917)
- Panthea (1917)
- The Message of the Mouse (1917)
- The Burden of Proof (1918)
- Lest We Forget (1918)
- The Forbidden City (1918)
- The Belle of New York (1919)
- The Third Degree (1919)
- Thin Ice (1919)
- A Regular Girl (1919)
- For Love or Money (1920)
- The Prey (1920)
- His Brother's Keeper (1921)
- Silver Wings (1922)
- Who Are My Parents? (1922)
- Zaza (1923)
- A Sainted Devil (1924)
