= Cora Pearl =

English courtesan (1836–1886)

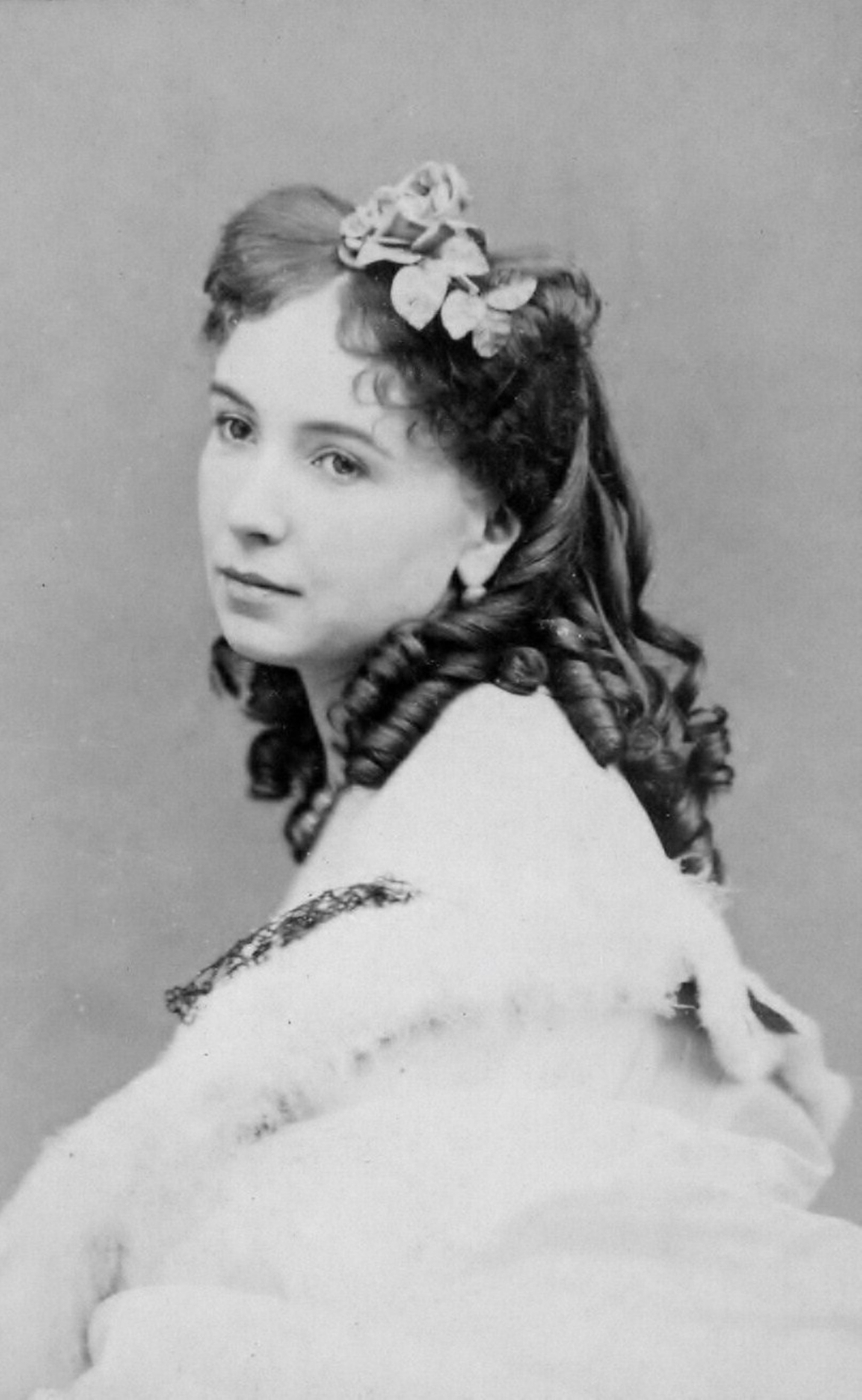
- Pearl c. 1860
- Born: Eliza Emma Crouch; December 1836; Plymouth, England
- Died: July 8, 1886 (aged 49); Paris, France
- Occupation: Courtesan
- Parents: Frederick Crouch; Lydia Pearson

Cora Pearl (born Eliza Emma Crouch; December 1836 – 8 July 1886) was an English courtesan or cocotte of the French demimonde who became well known during the period of the Second French Empire.

== Early life ==
Eliza Emma Crouch was born in Plymouth in December 1836, just a few months before the introduction of civil registration in England and Wales. She was baptised at St Andrew's Church, Plymouth together with her younger sister Hannah Lydia (born 30 November 1837) on 27 December 1837. Her subsequent use of her sister Louisa's birth certificate in her 1886 Mémoires, amended to appear as if it were her own, led to over a century of confusion over her date of birth. The exact date of her birth in December is still unknown.

Her father was the cellist and composer Frederick Nicholls Crouch, who married her mother, the contralto Lydia (née Pearson), at St Paul's Church, Covent Garden in 1832. By April 1841, Crouch had returned to London, leaving his wife and daughters in Plymouth. In 1843, he went through a Roman Catholic marriage ceremony with Elizabeth 'Bessie' George and had two more children. He left for the United States in 1849, leaving both wives and families behind. With several young children to care for, Crouch's mother Lydia brought Richard William Littley into the household, who was to be considered a "stepfather" by her children. With Littley, Lydia had two more children: Fanny (1847), and Henry (1849), Crouch's half-siblings.

Crouch was sent to a convent boarding school in Boulogne, where she learned to speak French. In 1850, she returned to live in London with her paternal grandmother, Anna Maria Watts (née Nicholls). On Sundays, a servant took her to church, and left her there; but on one occasion, in 1851, failed to collect her. Crouch, then fifteen years old, accepted the advances of an older man who approached her on the street, allowing him to take her to a drinking den, where he bought her cakes to eat and alcohol to drink, ultimately leading to the man raping Crouch, a virgin at that time.

Upon awakening, Crouch found the man had left her a five-pound note, more money than she had ever seen. Crouch later said the encounter left her with "an instinctive horror of men". After her sexual assault, Crouch did not return to her grandmother's home or that of her mother, but rented a room for herself in Covent Garden.

=== Life in London ===
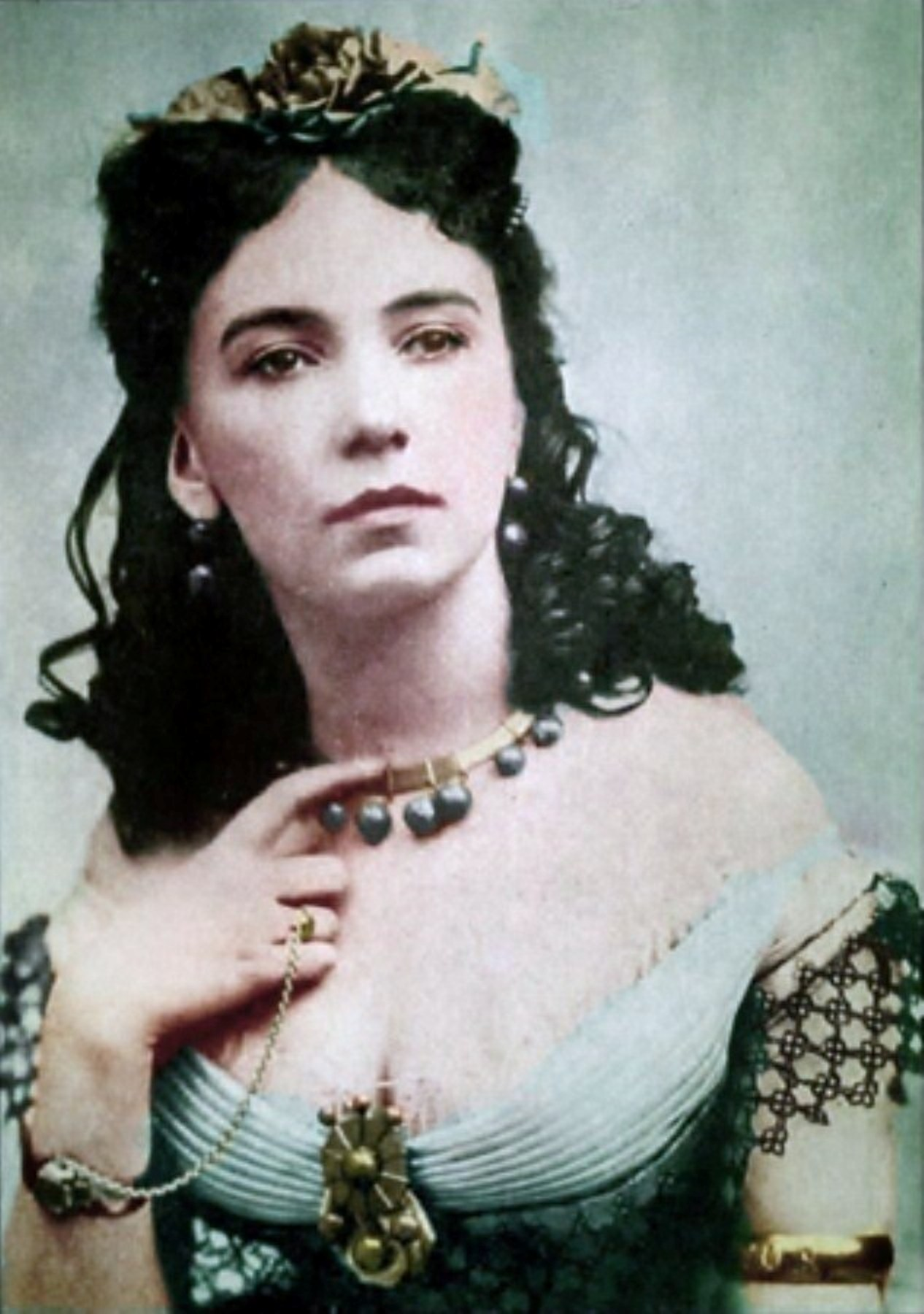
Cora Pearl (colorized picture) 1860

On her own in London, Crouch made the acquaintance of Robert Bignell, proprietor of a notorious pleasure establishment, the Argyll Rooms. Providing the combination of a bar, a dance hall and women available for hire, the establishment provided private alcoves and rooms where couples could retire for sexual activity. Crouch soon vacated her single room and moved into a suite at the Argyll Rooms, becoming Bignell's mistress.

Studying the life around her, Crouch realised that the life of the common prostitute was a tragic one, with the best result being that a woman could end up "poor and degraded", and the worst being a future that held "disease and death". Crouch resolved to practise the trade with higher expectations, with the goal of becoming the kept woman of select dedicated lovers with the financial means to keep her in luxury.

Crouch's involvement with Bignell lasted for some time, with the two travelling to Paris, posing as a married couple. Crouch became so enamoured with the city of Paris that she insisted that Bignell return to London without her, determined to remain in the French capital. It was at this time that Crouch took on the name Cora Pearl, a pseudonym chosen to resonate with the new identity and future she hoped to craft for herself in Paris.

== Life as a courtesan ==
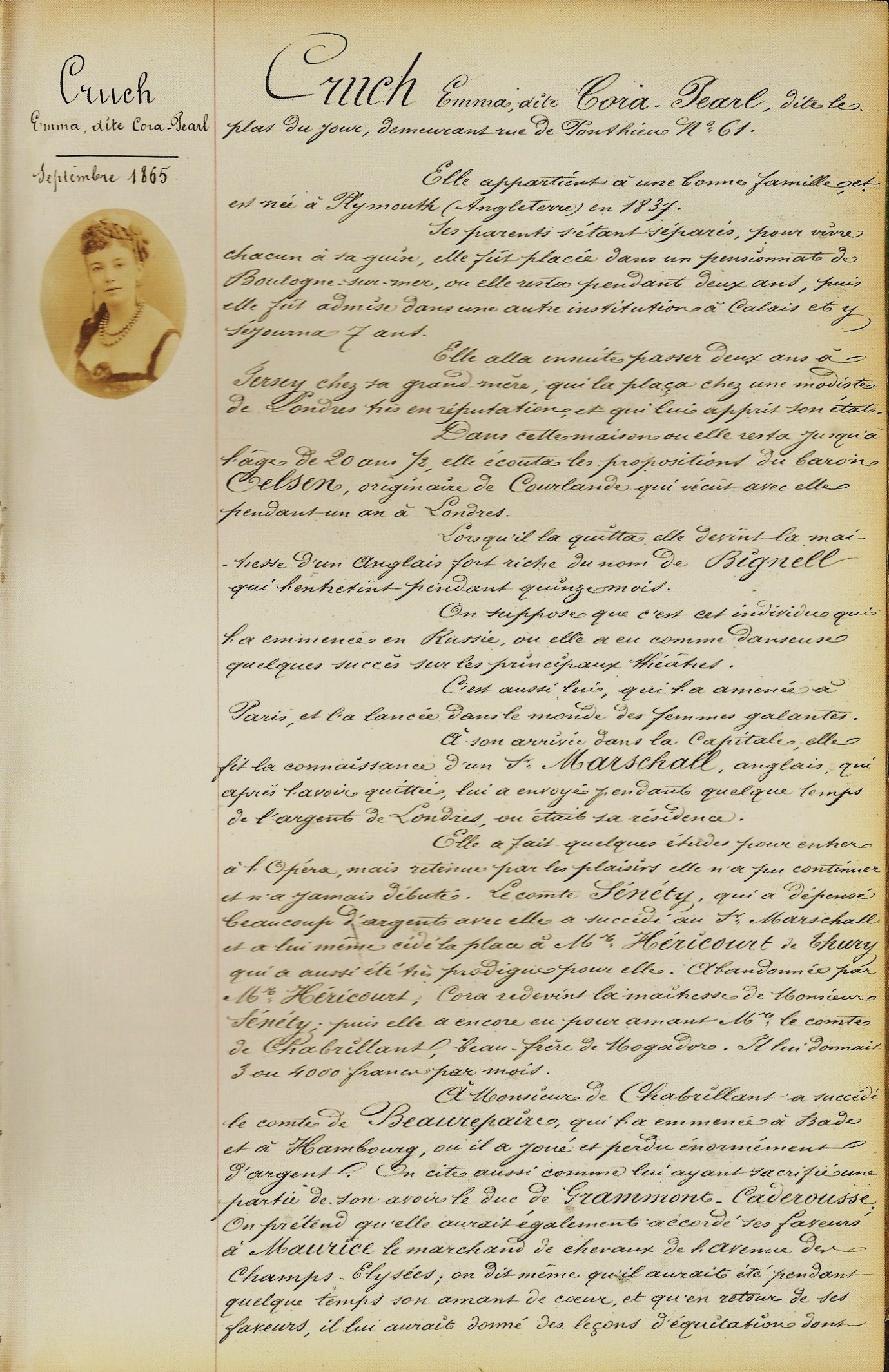
Cora Pearl's police file, 1865. The photographer is André-Adolphe-Eugène Disdéri.

Again on her own in a major metropolis, Pearl began working and selling sex under her new pseudonym, making a connection with a procurer known as Monsieur Roubisse, who set Pearl up in more suitable quarters, taught her the business rudiments of her new trade, and tutored her in refining and broadening her repertoire of professional skills. She worked for him for six years.

Her first lover of distinction was Victor Masséna, age 25, fifth Duke du Rivoli, and later fifth Prince of Essling. Masséna set Pearl up in opulence, giving her money, jewels, servants, and a private chef. He provided her with funds for gambling when she visited the casinos and racecourse in the fashionable resort of Baden, Germany, and bought her the first horse Pearl ever owned. During this time, Pearl became an accomplished horsewoman; it was said "she rode like an Amazon" and "was kinder to her horses than her lovers". Her liaison with Masséna lasted five years. While cultivating Masséna, she simultaneously was sharing her favours with Prince Achille Murat.

By 1860, Pearl was one of the more celebrated courtesans in Paris. She was the mistress of notable aristocrats, the Prince of Orange, heir to the throne of the Netherlands, Ludovic, Duc de Grammont-Caderousse, and more significantly Charles Duc de Morny, who was the half-brother of the Emperor Napoleon III. The Emperor's brother generously contributed to the life Pearl demanded.

In 1864, Pearl rented a château at Olivet in the region of the Loiret. Known as the Château de Beauséjour ("beautiful sojourn"). The château was a luxurious and expensively decorated residence with stained glass windows and immaculately maintained interiors and grounds. The château was conceived for gala entertainments, and there were rarely fewer than 15 guests at the dinner table, with the chef instructed to spare no cost on the expenditure for food. Pearl's boudoir in the château had a custom-made bronze bath monogrammed with her initials intertwined in gold.

Pearl was known for devising entertainments of unexpected and outrageous theatricality. On one such evening, she dared the group assembled around the dinner table "to cut into the next dish" about to be served. The meal's next course was Pearl herself, presented lying naked on a huge silver platter, garnished with parsley, and carried in by four large men.

Her most dedicated benefactor and enduring admirer was Joseph Charles Paul Bonaparte, the emperor's cousin. She met the prince in 1868 when he was age 42, and their liaison lasted nine years, the longest relationship in Pearl's career. He bought her several homes, one a veritable palace, known as "les Petites Tuileries".

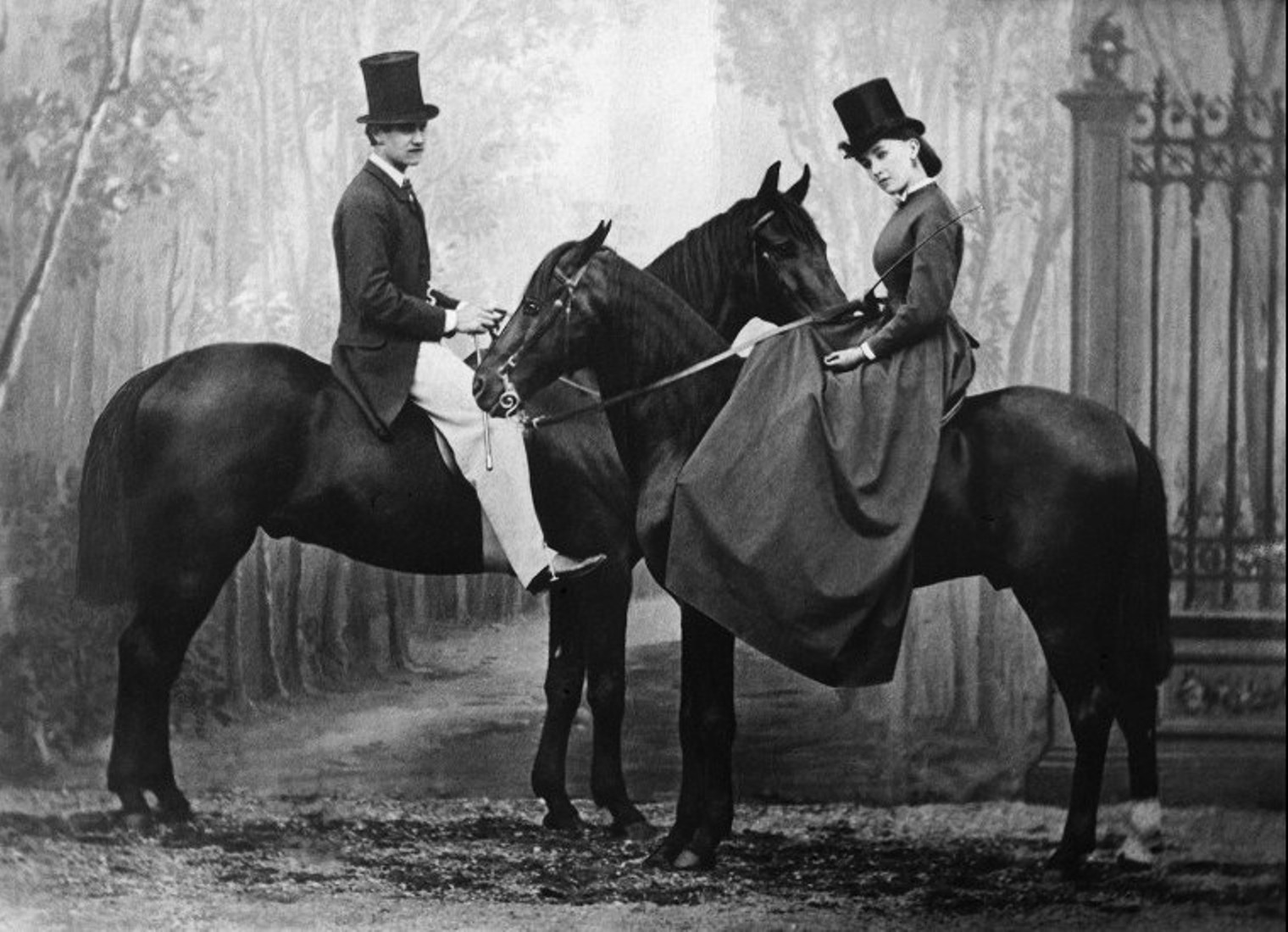
Cora Pearl, aged 29, and Prince Achille Murat (1865), photograph by Louis-Jean Delton.

In 1860, Pearl made an appearance at a masquerade ball attended by the elite of Parisian society. She caused a sensation in appearing as a scantily costumed Eve, whose degree of nudity diverged little from the biblical original. Invariably enthusiastic about exhibiting her physical charms to an audience, she took the role of a singing Cupid in the Jacques Offenbach operetta Orphée aux Enfers, (Orpheus in the Underworld) performed at the Théâtre des Bouffes-Parisiens in 1867. It was written that "Cora Pearl made an appearance half-naked on the stage. That evening the Jockey Club in its entirety, graced the theatre. All the names...of French nobility were there...It was a success of a kind." The chronicle of the evening continued with "Apparently the beautiful Cora Pearl had already munched up a brochette ("skewer") of five or six historical fortunes with her pretty white teeth."

The highest point of Pearl's career as courtesan were the years 1865 to 1870. In his biography The Pearl from Plymouth (1950), W. H. Holden wrote that there was evidence that Pearl regularly sent money to both her mother in England and father in America. For Pearl, money was for spending, for accumulating the luxuries of life, and buying her way to a coveted perch in the upper echelons of society. Her jewel collection alone was valued at 1 million francs; at one point, she owned three homes, and her clothing was made for her by the renowned couturier Charles Frederick Worth. As her career prospered, the gifts from her suitors needed to be both costly and imaginative. She pitted her admirers against one another, raising the price for her favours as the games among competitors escalated. In her heyday, she was able to command as high a price as 10,000 francs for an evening's entertainment.

=== Celebrity ===
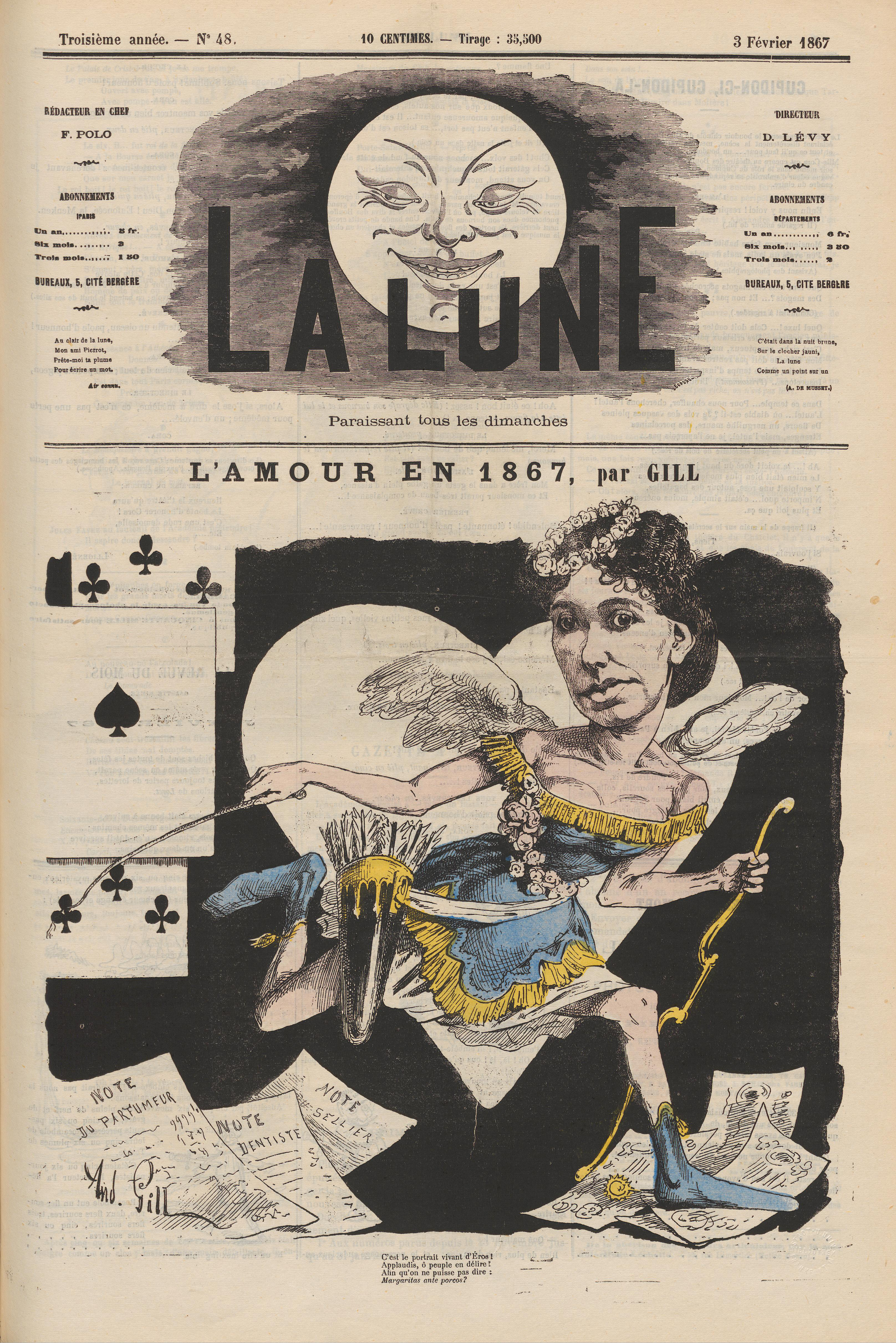
Caricature in La Lune by André Gill, 3 February 1867

Pearl was known for dressing creatively, with the intent to provoke either shock or awe. Théodore de Banville wrote of her affinity for dying her hair bold colours; she was once seen riding out in her carriage, her hair the colour of a lemon, dyed to match the carriage's yellow satin interior. In another instance, she appeared in a blue gown, her dog's coat dyed to match her wardrobe.

Pearl also used makeup in a manner heavier than most women of the time, using makeup to accentuate her eyes and eyelashes, and wearing face powder tinted with silver or pearls to give her skin a shimmering appearance. Jean-Philippe Worth, the son of the couturier Worth, pronounced her "shockingly overdone" in this aspect. In 1867, a drink came into vogue, inspired by Pearl, dubbed the "Tears of Cora Pearl". Alfred Delvau wrote a tribute to Pearl in Les Plaisirs de Paris in 1867, declaring that: "You are today, Madame, the renown, the preoccupation, the scandal and the toast of Paris. Everywhere they talk only of you."

== Decline ==
=== L'affaire Duval ===
At age 37, Pearl became involved in a relationship that resulted in the decline of her success and fortune. Pearl had become embroiled in a relationship with a wealthy young man, Alexandre Duval, 10 years her junior, whose obsession for her was so intense that he spent his entire fortune on sustaining his liaison with her, giving her jewels, fine horses, and money. It was reported that at one point, Duval gave her an exquisitely bound book, a 100-page volume where each page was bookmarked by a 1,000 franc bill. Pearl ultimately dismissed him, a finality that Duval could not accept.

On 19 December 1872, Duval went to her home, it is believed, with the intention of killing her. The gun he brought accidentally discharged, wounding him near fatally; initially near death, he eventually recovered, but the consequences of the event proved disastrous for Pearl's reputation. Publicized as l'affaire Duval, the scandal caused the authorities to order Pearl to leave the country, leading to her expulsion from Paris to first London and later Monaco and Nice. The contents of her Paris home were sold.

=== Financial difficulties ===
The Franco-Prussian War of 1870 brought at its end a new French Republic as well as cultural and political changes to French society. The era in which Pearl had achieved her greatest success was over, with the Third Republic seeing diminution of aristocratic privilege and a resurgence of conservative values. Pearl was no longer able to attract the titled men who had been her prime clients; in 1874, her long tenure as the mistress of Prince Napoleon ended at his request. He wrote her a touching, carefully worded letter of regret; he could no longer sustain the emotional and professional toll the relationship required of him.

Pearl retreated from the public eye during this period. Following the advice of Prince Napoleon, she carefully liquidated her superfluous assets, starting with her large rue de Chaillot mansion in 1873. The property was sold to fellow courtesan Blanche d’Antigny, and the profits from this sale and the accompanying furniture auction helped to fund Cora’s lifestyle for some years. In 1877 she sold off a significant collection of silver at Drouots.

Popular contemporary gossip suggested that Pearl had been forced to return to common prostitution and was, by 1883, living in a rented apartment above the shop of a coach builder on the avenue Champs-Elysées. In fact, she had moved into a more modest townhouse on the rue de Bassano, and retained ownership of her estate at Olivet until 1885. The estate, which included the Château de Beauséjour, was heavily mortgaged by that time, however.

Pearl's biographer, W. H. Holden, interviewed an acquaintance of hers in 1947, who asserted that numerous members of the Paris Jockey Club subscribed to a fund which was delivered to Pearl each month. He recalled meeting her in 1878 at the races, where she arrived in an open-top carriage and was "immediately surrounded by fashionable men ... though she was not pretty, she was very animated, there was much talking and laughing, and the men evidently enjoyed her company."

==== Memoirs ====
The Mémoires de Cora Pearl had been greatly anticipated when it became known that Pearl was writing her autobiography. Published in 1886 in Paris and subsequently in England in London, Pearl claimed to have sent relevant pages to her former lovers, offering to anonymise their names if they paid her. In the event, most names were altered, but the anonymised figures of many have since been identified.

In the early 1980s, William Blatchford claimed to have located the Memoirs of Cora Pearl, which he said had been published in 1890, after Pearl's death. Supposedly an earlier version of the book published in 1886, this volume purported to date back to an earlier date, perhaps even as early 1873. Decidedly more frank and sexually explicit than the 1886 memoirs, their idiomatic English – expressive of a provincial, unsophisticated use of the language – convinced many of the work's authenticity when the memoirs were published by Granada under the title Grand Horizontal, The Erotic Memoirs of a Passionate Lady. However, Blatchford turned out to be a pseudonym adopted by the real author of the 'memoirs', Derek Parker, a former chairman of the Society of Authors, who later admitted that he had hoaxed Granada.

== Death ==
Soon after the publication of her memoirs, Pearl became seriously ill with intestinal cancer. Her biographer Holden wrote: "The various accounts of Cora spending her last days in dire poverty in one squalid room are very much exaggerated". Pearl died on 8 July 1886, with obituary notices appearing in the London and Paris papers. She died in her rue de Bassano property, as verified by her death certificate, and amongst her eclectic finery. Her possessions were disposed of in a two-day sale in October 1886, the catalogue for which included fine and decorative art from major artisans, clothing, jewellery, and a substantial personal library.

Pearl was buried in Batignolles cemetery, (plot number 10, row 4), in a grave leased for five years. After those five years, what remained of her body was removed to an ossuary and the grave was reused.

== References in popular culture ==
- In 1887, Elizabeth Blackwell's "Purchase of Women: the Great Economic Blunder" named Cora Pearl as an example of the immoral influence of older sex workers on men of renown, claiming "our generation has witnessed the enslaving power of these tyrants of lust. They have dried up the generous enthusiasm of our youth, and destroyed those principles of trust, freedom, and sympathy which should guide our domestic and foreign policy."
- Cora Pearl appears in Otto Flake's novel Hortense oder die Rückkehr nach Baden-Baden (1933). When asked about her, Ivan Turgenev claims that "She is a Jewess from Moscow who married a ghetto tailor, then abandoned him, leaving her child behind." (ch.32)
- Cora Pearl appears in Robert Goddard's novel Painting the Darkness in connection with her relationship with Prince Napoléon Bonaparte.
- An extended anecdote about Cora Pearl appears in Robert Greene's The Art of Seduction, in the chapter called "The Natural."
- Cora Pearl appears in Alexander Chee's novel The Queen of the Night in act 2, chapter 6
- Cora Pearl was referenced in Cuttlefish That Loves Diving's book titled Lord of Mysteries 2: Circle of Inevitability as a courtesan named Perle.
- Cora Pearl is mentioned by name in Diamonds and Deadlines by Betsy Priolieu, with her blue dyed dog.
- Cora Pearl is mentioned in the song "Um Chagga Lagga" by Pixies.

== Sources ==
- Clarke, Joseph F (1977), Pseudonyms: The Names behind the Names, Thomas Nelson Publishers, ISBN 978-0-8407-6567-3
- Frayser, Suzanne G.; Whitby, Thomas J. (1995), Studies in Human Sexuality: A Selected Guide, Libraries Unlimited, ISBN 978-1-56308-131-6
- Hickman, Katie (2003), Courtesans: Money, Sex and Fame in the Nineteenth Century (First ed.), William Morrow & Company, ISBN 978-0-06-620955-5
- Holden, Wilfred Herbert (1950), The Pearl from Plymouth: Eliza Emma Crouch, alias Cora Pearl, with notes on some of her celebrated contemporaries, British Technical and General Press
- Pearl, Cora (1886), The Memoirs of Cora Pearl: The English Beauty of the French Empire, George Vickers
- Pearl, Cora (1983), Blatchford, William (ed.), Grand Horizontal: The Erotic Memoirs of a Passionate Lady, Stein and Day, ISBN 978-0-8128-2917-4; UK edition: The Memoirs of Cora Pearl: The Erotic Reminiscences of a Flamboyant 19th Century Courtesan (Granada, 1983) ISBN 978-0-246-11915-5
- Richardson, Joanna (1967), The courtesans: the demi-monde in nineteenth-century France, World Pub. Co.
- Rounding, Virginia (2004), Grandes Horizontales: The Lives and Legends of Four Nineteenth-Century Courtesans, Bloomsbury USA, ISBN 978-1-58234-450-8
- Tannahill, Reay (1992), Sex in History, Scarborough House, ISBN 978-0-8128-8540-8
