= The Wolf of Debt =

1915 film by Jack Harvey

- Directed by: Jack Harvey
- Written by: Hugh C. Weir (Scenario)
- Starring: William Garwood; Violet Mersereau; Fanny Hayes
- Distributed by: Universal Film Manufacturing Company
- Release date: October 1, 1915
- Running time: 4 reels (approximately 40 minutes)
- Country: United States
- Languages: Silent film English intertitles

The Wolf of Debt is a 1915 American silent drama film directed by Jack Harvey. The film stars William Garwood and Violet Mersereau and Fanny Hayes.

== Plot ==
Mrs Stanhope is a poor widow who pressures her daughter Helen to marry a wealthy broker named Anthony Stuart. Helen refuses. Soon after she meets millionaire Bruce Marsden at a golf course and they are immediately drawn to each other. Within a month they are engaged. Before the wedding Marsden transfers his Mesupa copper stock to Helen as a sign of trust.

The broker handling Marsden’s stocks mismanages the funds and loses everything. Despite this setback Helen chooses to marry Marsden even though he is no longer wealthy. Her mother is deeply upset and urges Stuart to win Helen away from her husband.

Stuart gives Marsden a job in his office and begins paying close attention to Helen but she firmly rejects him. When this fails Stuart sends Marsden out of town on business and invites Helen and her mother to a high society event. At her mother’s request, Helen buys an expensive dress and attends. Marsden returns earlier than expected and follows them. Growing suspicious he secretly watches Helen and Stuart as they leave together in Stuart’s car.

When the car breaks down Stuart takes Helen to a roadside café. Marsden arrives and angrily accuses his wife before quitting his job with Stuart and finding work elsewhere. Soon afterward Mesupa stock rises sharply due to a new ore discovery. Stuart begins buying heavily and is rumored to be trying to control the copper market.

When the stock reaches a high price Marsden uses his lawyer Roger Murdock to release his remaining shares into the market. The sudden sale drives the price down and financially destroys Stuart. Helen then explains everything to her husband and the misunderstanding is resolved. Marsden and Helen are reunited and their marriage is restored.

== Cast ==
- William Garwood as Bruce Marsden.
- Violet Mersereau as Helen Stanhope
- Fanny Hayes as Mrs. Stanhope
- Brinsley Shaw as Anthony Stuart
- Morgan Thorpe
