= For Love or Money (1920 film) =

1920 silent film

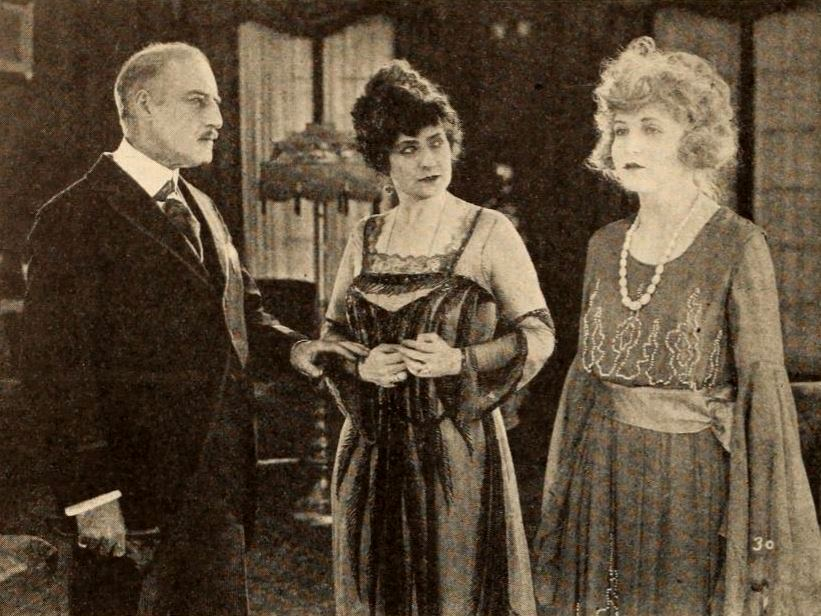
- Directed by: Burton L. King
- Written by: Edith Sessions Tupper
- Produced by: Burton L. King
- Starring: Virginia Lee; Harry Benham; L. Rogers Lytton
- Cinematography: Ernest Haller
- Production company: Burton King Productions
- Distributed by: Hallmark Pictures Corporation
- Release date: July 1920
- Running time: 60 minutes
- Country: United States
- Languages: Silent; English intertitles

For Love or Money is a 1920 American silent drama film directed by Burton L. King and starring Virginia Lee, Harry Benham and L. Rogers Lytton. J. W. Film Corp. acquired the film and re-released it in 1921 as The Road to Arcady.

== Cast ==
- Virginia Lee as Antoinette Gerard
- Harry Benham as John T. Hamilton
- L. Rogers Lytton as Benson Churchill
- Stephen Grattan as Oliver Gerard
- Julia Swayne Gordon as Helen Gerard
- Mildred Wayne as Sue Dennison
- Hugh Huntley as Bob Gerard

== Bibliography ==
- Munden, Kenneth White. The American Film Institute Catalog of Motion Pictures Produced in the United States, Part 1. University of California Press, 1997.
