= Respectable by Proxy =

1920 film

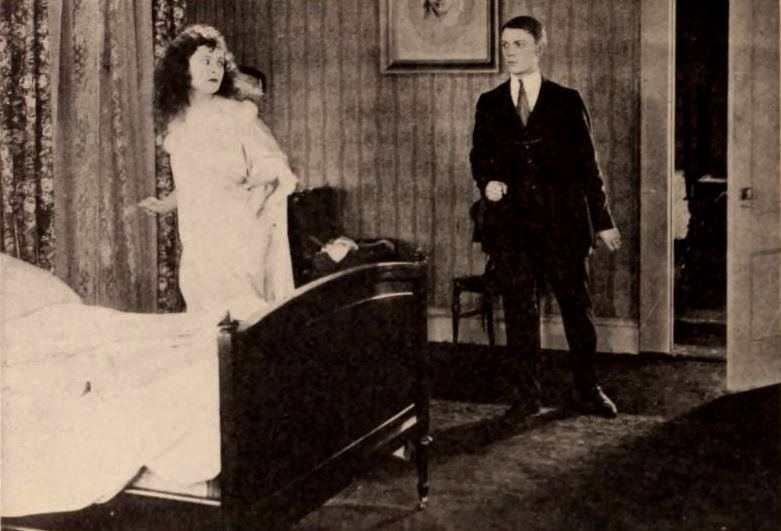
- Directed by: J. Stuart Blackton
- Written by: Florence Myott; Stanley Olmstead
- Produced by: J. Stuart Blackton
- Starring: Sylvia Breamer; Robert Gordon; William R. Dunn
- Cinematography: William S. Adams
- Production company: J. Stuart Blackton Feature Pictures
- Distributed by: Pathé Exchange
- Release date: February 15, 1920
- Country: United States
- Languages: Silent; English intertitles

Respectable by Proxy is a 1920 American silent drama film directed by J. Stuart Blackton and starring Sylvia Breamer, Robert Gordon and William R. Dunn.

== Plot ==
Rich Southerner John Stanley Hale meets flirtatious actress Elizabeth Roddard, she induces him to marry her, but after several days of quarreling, he flees to Russia. After John's vessel is sunk in mid-ocean and he is reported dead, Elizabeth convinces her destitute and ailing friend Betty Blair to pose as John's widow in order to inherit his fine home in Alabama. Betty complies and becomes indispensable to Mrs. Hale, who is despondent over her son's death and has become the victim of scheming relatives. One day, John returns, and discovering that Betty has protected his mother from his greedy relations, falls in love with her. Elizabeth then reveals that her marriage was never legal and that he is free to marry his "proxy wife."

== Cast ==
- Sylvia Breamer as Betty Blair
- Robert Gordon as John Stanley Hale
- William R. Dunn as Clinton Hale
- Bessie Stinson as Rita Middleton
- Eulalie Jensen as Elizabeth Roddard
- Margaret Barry as Madame Hale
- Morgan Thorpe as Clayton Walpole

== Bibliography ==
- Darby, William. Masters of Lens and Light: A Checklist of Major Cinematographers and Their Feature Films. Scarecrow Press, 1991.
