= The Queen's Mate =

1880 English comic opera

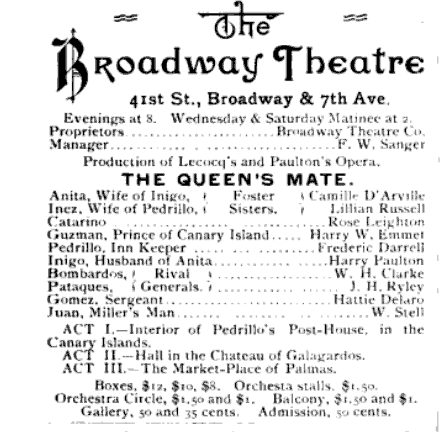
Opening night cast

The Queen's Mate is an 1888 comic opera in English adapted from the French La Princesse des Canaries by Charles Lecocq (or Pepita in London in 1888), with a libretto by Harry Paulton.

The play was first performed in San Francisco in January 1888, and successfully toured on its way east through April.

It had its New York City debut at the former Broadway Theatre on May 2, 1888, presented by the J.C. Duff Company. It ran through June 30 for 61 total performances, before returning after a summer break to play again from August 13 to September 8 (28 additional performances).

After closing in New York, it again went on the road, for 14 weeks, and played the month of October in Chicago.

== Original Broadway cast ==
- Anita by Camille D'Arville (her first appearance in America)
- Inez by Lillian Russell
- Catarina by Rose Leighton
- Guzman by Harry W. Emmett
- Pedrillo by Frederic Darrell
- Inigo by Harry Paulton
- Bombardos by W.H. Clark
- Pataques by J.H. Ryley
- Hans by Frederic Clifton
- Gomez by Hattie Delaro
- Juan by W. Stell

The scenery was created by H.E. Hoyt and Harley Merry.
