= Human Desire (1919 film) =

1919 film by Wilfrid North

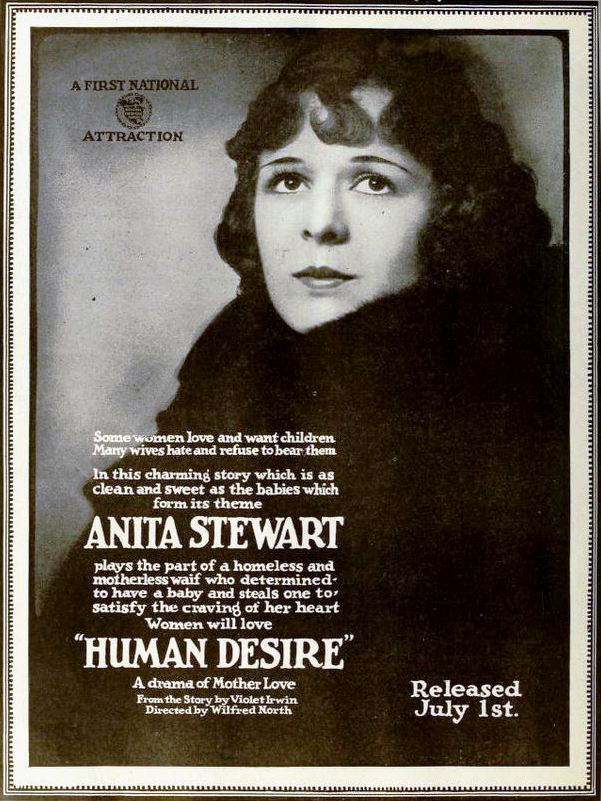
- Advertisement
- Directed by: Wilfrid North
- Based on: Human Desire; 1913 novel by Violet Irwin
- Produced by: Anita Stewart; Louis B. Mayer
- Starring: Anita Stewart
- Distributed by: Associated First National (later First National)
- Release date: November 1919
- Running time: 6 reels
- Country: United States
- Language: Silent (English intertitles)

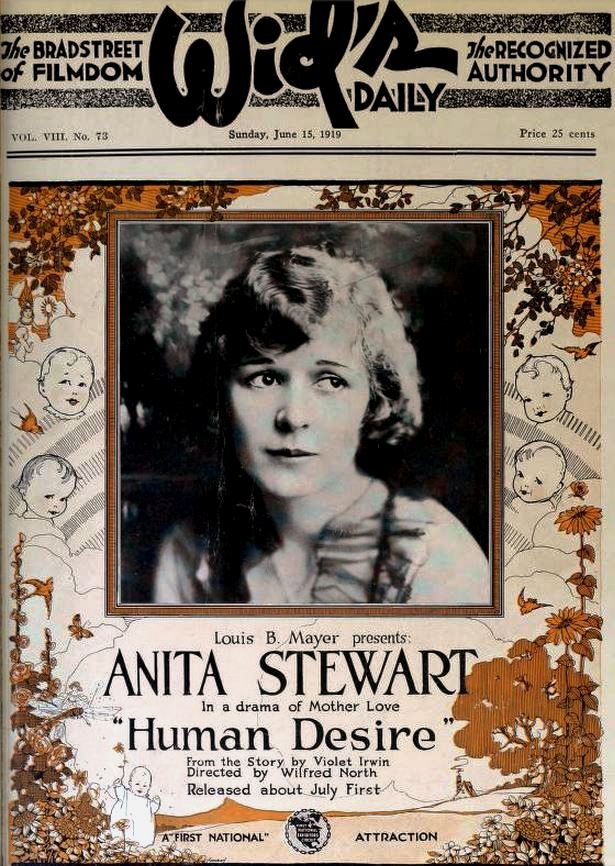
Wids advert

Human Desire is a 1919 American silent romantic drama film starring Anita Stewart who produced along with Louis B. Mayer. It was distributed by Associated First National.

A copy of Human Desire is preserved in the Library of Congress and the Academy Film Archive.

== Plot ==
As described in a film magazine, the orphan Bernice (Stewart) is raised almost to womanhood by the good sisters in an Italian convent. Worshiping a picture of the Madonna and Child, she is seized by a great desire to have a child she can call her own. Running away to America, where she has been told babies are plentiful, she is taken in by Robert Bruce, an artist whose wife has refused to divorce him, and poses for his projected masterpiece, a Madonna. Bernice falls in love with the baby borrowed for this posing and is filled with sorrow when the child is taken away. Robert, who has become sincerely but honorably in love with the girl, adopts a baby for her. His wife meets Bernice and the baby, believes the worst, and insults her. Bernice takes the child and leaves the house, becoming lost in the city and finally finding refuge in a hospital where the child dies. Robert learns from his wife the reason for Bernice's departure, locates the girl, and, after divorcing his wife, marries her.

== Cast ==
- Anita Stewart as Bernice
- Conway Tearle as Robert Bruce
- Vernon Steele as Jasper Norton
- Eulalie Jensen as Helen
- Naomi Childers as Marguerite Hunt
- Templar Saxe as Paul Stapleton
- Hattie Delaro as Miss March
