= Mrs. Dane's Danger =

1916 film by Wilfrid North

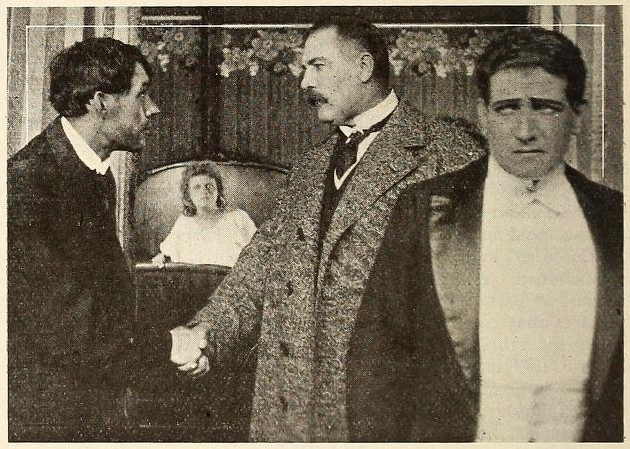
- Still from the film printed in Motion Picture News, January 15, 1916.
- Directed by: Wilfrid North
- Written by: Charles Gaskill
- Starring: Wilfrid North; Lillian Walker; Donald Hall; William Dunn; L. Rogers Lytton
- Production company: Vitagraph Company of America
- Distributed by: General Film Company
- Release date: March 6, 1916 (United States)
- Running time: 40 minutes
- Country: United States
- Language: English

Mrs. Dane's Danger is a 1916 American silent drama film directed by Wilfrid North. The film featured Lillian Walker, Wilfrid North, Donald Hall, William Dunn and L. Rogers Lytton in the lead roles.

Primarily shot at Vitagraph's studio in Flatbush, Brooklyn, the film also included location shooting at the Hotel Majestic in Manhattan and a panoramic sequence of Central Park.

== Cast ==
- Lillian Walker as Alice Dane
- Wilfrid North as David Dane
- Donald Hall as Rex Gordon
- William Dunn as Jasper Dicey
- L. Rogers Lytton as Simon Corey

== Preservation ==
Mrs. Dane's Danger is currently presumed lost. In February of 2021, the film was cited by the National Film Preservation Board on their Lost U.S. Silent Feature Films list.
