= Eulalie Jensen =

American actress (1884–1952)

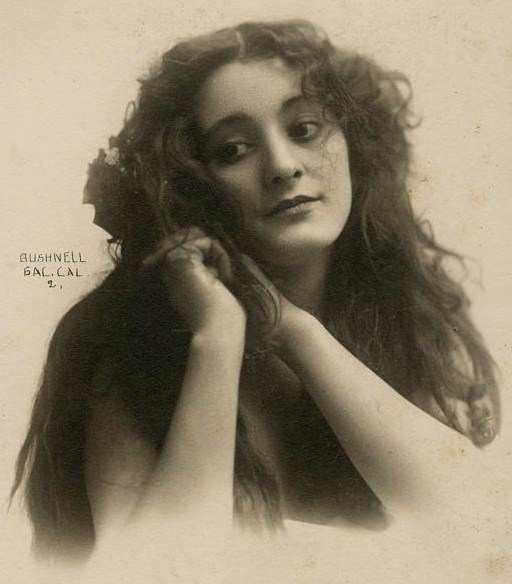
- Jensen in 1907
- Born: December 24, 1884; St. Louis, Missouri U.S.
- Died: October 7, 1952 (aged 67); Los Angeles, California U.S.
- Occupation: Actress

Eulalie Jensen (December 24, 1884 – October 7, 1952) was an American actress on the New York stage and in silent films.

== Biography ==
Born in St. Louis, Missouri, she was selected as one of six extra girls from the 200 applicants responding to a New York newspaper ad inserted by Sarah Bernhardt. The famed actress was making a visit to New York City. At this time, Miss Jensen was completely unknown, but this was the beginning of her film career. A number of years of stage experience enabled Jensen to become a fine emotional actress. Her stage engagements included a role in The Million at the 39th St. Theatre. This was a four-act farce by M. M. Ber and Guille Ward. The show was also featured in New Haven, Connecticut at the Hyperion Theatre. Both productions were in 1911.

In 1912, Jensen wired the managers of the Panama-Pacific Exposition of her candidacy for the model of the Spirit of the Golden Gate. The event was to be in San Francisco, California in 1915. She was selected as the model for the decorative design of the Louisiana Purchase Exposition in 1904. Jensen denied she was the most beautiful woman in America. She believed her features "adapted for decorative design".

Her film career began in 1914 with eight films. Among these were Eve's Daughter, Maria's Sacrifice, The Moonstones of Fez, My Official Wife, and Romantic Josie. Jensen made The Goddess (1915) at the old Vitagraph studio in New York, appeared in The Spark Divine (1919) and co-starred with Norma Talmadge in The Passion Flower (1921).

She became known for her vivid character portrayals. She played a Salvation Army worker and a bird woman among many others. The latter character was a prominent member of the cast of Freckles (1928). The film was adapted from the novel by Gene Stratton-Porter. Eulalie's film career continued into the sound medium with her final films, A Lost Lady (1934) and Society Doctor (1935).

== Death ==
Eulalie Jensen died in 1952 in Los Angeles, California, aged 67.

== Partial filmography ==
- St. Elmo (1914)
- My Official Wife (1914)
- C.O.D. (1914)
- The Making Over of Geoffrey Manning (1915)
- The Wheels of Justice (1915)
- Salvation Joan (1916)
- The Tarantula (1916)
- Mary Jane's Pa (1917)
- The Triumph of the Weak (1918)
- Tangled Lives (1918)
- Wild Primrose (1918)
- The Captain's Captain (1919)
- A Temperamental Wife (1919)
- Thin Ice (1919)
- The Spark Divine (1919)
- Human Desire (1919)
- The Cinema Murder (1919)
- The Whisper Market (1920)
- Man and His Woman (1920)
- Respectable by Proxy (1920)
- The House of the Tolling Bell (1920)
- The Passion Flower (1921)
- The Iron Trail (1921)
- Any Wife (1922)
- When Husbands Deceive (1922)
- Rags to Riches (1922)
- Deserted at the Altar (1922)
- Haunted Valley (1923)
- The Woman With Four Faces (1923)
- The Hunchback of Notre Dame (1923)
- Slave of Desire (1923)
- The Yankee Consul (1924)
- Being Respectable (1924)
- Wine of Youth (1924)
- Ranger of the Big Pines (1925)
- With This Ring (1925)
- Havoc (1925)
- The Scarlet Honeymoon (1925)
- The Thundering Herd (1925)
- The Circle (1925)
- Flower of Night (1925)
- The Happy Warrior (1925)
- The Sap (1926)
- Volcano! (1926)
- Fig Leaves (1926)
- Bachelor Brides (1926)
- Forever After (1926)
- A Kiss In A Taxi (1927)
- Fighting Love (1927)
- Baby Brother (1927)
- The Heart Thief (1927)
- Uncle Tom's Cabin (1927)
- Mother Machree (1928)
- The Little Shepherd of Kingdom Come (1928)
- She Goes to War (1929)
- Strong Boy (1929)
- The Eyes of the World (1930)
- Never the Twain Shall Meet (1931)
- Up Pops the Devil (1931)
- Confessions of a Co-Ed (1931)
- Union Depot (1932)
- Miss Pinkerton (1932)
- A Lost Lady (1934)
- Society Doctor (1935)
