= His Brother's Keeper (1921 film) =

1921 film

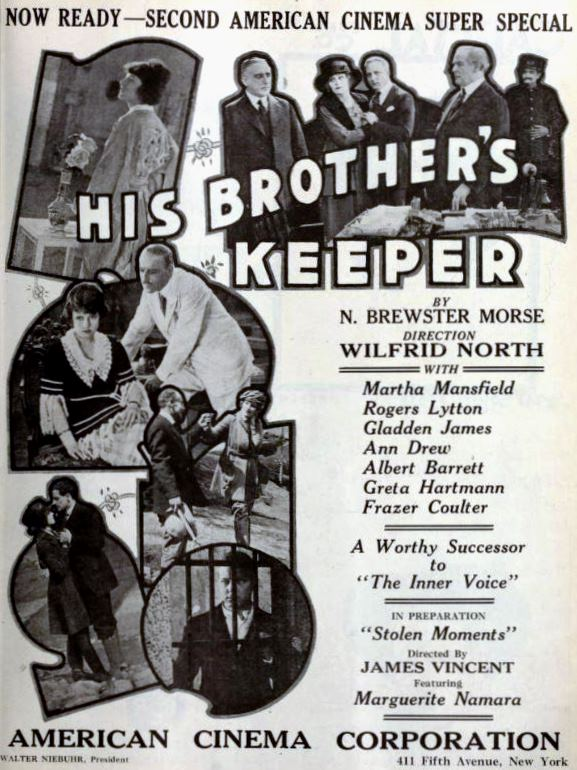
- Directed by: Wilfrid North
- Written by: Brewster Morse
- Starring: Albert L. Barrett; Martha Mansfield; L. Rogers Lytton
- Cinematography: William Crolly; Arthur T. Quinn
- Production company: American Cinema Corporation
- Distributed by: Pioneer Film Corporation
- Release date: February 14, 1921
- Running time: 60 minutes
- Country: United States
- Language: Silent (English intertitles)

His Brother's Keeper is a 1921 American silent crime film directed by Wilfrid North and starring Albert L. Barrett, Martha Mansfield and L. Rogers Lytton. It is now considered a lost film.

== Cast ==
- Albert L. Barrett as John Bonham
- Martha Mansfield as Helen Harding
- L. Rogers Lytton as Rex Radcliffe
- Frazer Coulter as William Harding
- Gretchen Hartman as Amalita Cordova
- Gladden James as Harvey Weer
- Anne Drew as Mrs. Harvey Weer

== Bibliography ==
- John T. Soister, Henry Nicolella & Steve Joyce. American Silent Horror, Science Fiction and Fantasy Feature Films, 1913-1929. McFarland, 2014.
