= Wilfrid North =

Silent film director, actor and writer

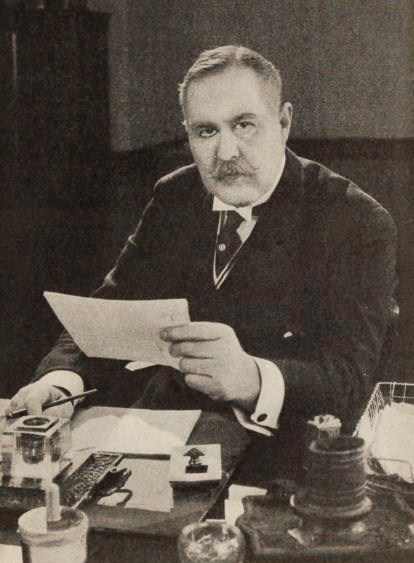
- From a 1920 trade directory
- Born: William Northcroft; 16 January 1863; London, England
- Died: 3 June 1935 (aged 72); Hollywood, United States
- Other names: Wilfred North
- Occupations: Film actor, director and writer

Wilfrid North (16 January 1863 – 3 June 1935), also spelled Wilfred North, was an Anglo-American film director, actor, and writer of the silent film era. He directed 102 films, including short films; acted in 43 films; and wrote the story for three films.

== Biography ==
Wilfrid North was born in London on 16 January 1863. A stage actor long before entering films, North had appeared on Broadway in 1899 with Mrs. Fiske and Maurice Barrymore in Becky Sharp and with Julia Marlowe in 1901 in When Knighthood was in Flower.

North joined Vitagraph Studios as a director in 1912. Vitagraph appointed him the director of films of its comedy star, John Bunny. North directed several films of the Bunny series like Bunny's Honeymoon, Bunny Versus Cutey, Bunny and the Bunny Hug, Bunny's Birthday Surprise, Bunny as a Reporter, Bunny's Dilemma and Bunny for the Cause, earning him popularity in the Vitagraph Studios, which led to his appointment as the supervising director of the company's studio in Brooklyn in 1917.

Actress Anita Stewart, who had started her acting career at Vitagraph and had acted in several films directed by her brother-in-law Ralph Ince, felt that the new director, North, was incompetent in his work, and went on strike during the production of two films. However, when Stewart had set up her own production company called Anita Stewart Productions, she acted in the 1919 film Human Desire, directed by North.

In September 1913 North was temporarily blinded as a result of a yacht-cannon that exploded prematurely during the principal photography of the film Miss Tomboy and Freckles. The incident happened at the Atlantic Yacht Club in Sea Gate, New York when the film crew was preparing for the filming of a yacht race. It was believed that spark from one of the actor's cigarettes had caused the explosion. North's face was badly burnt as he was pouring flour into the cannon. He recovered and returned to work on the film on 15 October.

Along with J. Stuart Blackton he directed Vitagraph's controversial 1915 war film The Battle Cry of Peace, based on the book Defenseless America by Hudson Maxim, which called on the United States to enter World War I against Germany.

In 1920 another film production studio, Select Pictures, signed him as director. North worked for Select Pictures for a short period of time but eventually returned to Vitagraph, which made him the company's production manager. Among the most famous of North's later films was His Brother's Keeper (filmed in 1920 but released in 1921), a crime horror film, now considered lost, starring Martha Mansfield and Albert Barrett in the lead roles. After the introduction of talkies, North started playing supporting roles in films, especially the characters of judges, which he played in Port of Dreams (1929), No More Children (1929), The Trial of Mary Dugan (1929), Girl Overboard (1929), Red-Headed Woman (1932), The Washington Masquerade (1932), Unashamed (1932), The Penguin Pool Murder (1932), and The Defense Rests (1934). His last film was Diamond Jim, in which he played a stockbroker.

North also acted in and directed various plays for theatre. He directed the 1917 stageplay Daybreak, written by Jane Cowl and Jane Murfin, and produced by Selwyn & Co. The play was staged in Harris Theatre from 14 August 1917 to October 1917.

== Personal life ==
North married actress Marian F. Gragg (1887–1945). He died on 3 June 1935 in Hollywood.

His 1931 film Corianton: A Story of Unholy Love was screened at the 13th LDS Film Festival in 2014.

== Selected filmography ==
=== Director ===
- Corianton: A Story of Unholy Love (1931)
- Mrs. Dane's Danger (1922)
- Lucky Carson (1921)
- The Mind the Paint Girl
- The Battle Cry of Peace
- Out of the Storm (1913)
- Millionaire for a Day
- His Brother's Keeper (1921)
- A Dream of Fair Women (1920)
- The Undercurrent (1919)
- Human Desire (1919)
- Over the Top (1918)
- Clover's Rebellion (1917)
- Sally in a Hurry
- Dimple's Baby
- Kitty MacKay
- Indiscretion (1917)
- The Dollar and the Law (1916)
- The Blue Envelope Mystery
- The Kid
- Hesper of the Mountains
- The Ordeal of Elizabeth
- Salvation Joan
- Green Stockings (1916)
- A 'Model' Wife (1915)
- The Shabbies
- Lillian's Husbands
- Dimples and the Ring
- The Honeymoon Pact
- The Silent W
- The Little Doll's Dressmaker
- Playing the Game
- Dimples, the Auto Salesman
- To Save Him for His Wife
- A Lily in Bohemia
- The Guttersnipe
- The Love Whip
- Lifting the Ban of Coventry
- The Capitulation of the Major
- Peggy of Fifth Avenue
- Breaking In
- Hearts and the Highway (1915)
- Arthur Truman's Ward (1914)
- The Methods of Margaret
- Miss Tomboy and Freckles
- In the Land of Arcadia
- A Costume Piece
- A Close Call
- The Lost Cord
- Lily of the Valley
- The New Stenographer
- The Winning Trick
- Bread Upon the Waters
- Lillian's Dilemma
- The Persistent Mr. Prince
- The Ladies' War
- The Accomplished Mrs. Thompson
- Eve's Daughter
- The Boys of the I.O.U.
- Cutey's Wife
- The Awakening of Barbara Dare
- Fanny's Melodrama
- The Chicken Inspector
- Love, Luck and Gasoline
- Art for a Heart
- The Speeder's Revenge
- Doctor Polly
- The Street Singers (1914)
- The Life Saver (1913)
- Matrimonial Manoeuvres
- The Mystery of the Silver Skull
- Bunny for the Cause
- Sauce for the Goose
- Fortune's Turn
- When Women Go on the Warpath; or, Why Jonesville Went Dry
- The Clown and the Prima Donna
- The Feudists
- The Intruder
- When Society Calls
- The Only Way
- Hubby's Toothache
- The Carpenter
- A Millinery Bomb
- Love's Quarantine
- One Good Joke Deserves Another
- Bunny's Dilemma
- His Tired Uncle
- His House in Order; or, The Widower's Quest
- Bunny as a Reporter
- Bunny's Birthday Surprise
- Bunny and the Bunny Hug
- Cupid's Hired Man
- Disciplining Daisy
- Bunny Versus Cutey
- The Stronger Sex
- Seeing Double
- The Fortune
- Bunny's Honeymoon (1913)
- On Her Wedding Day (1912)

=== Actor ===
- Mrs. Dane's Danger (1916) - David Dane
- The Son of Wallingford (1921) - J. Rufus Wallingford
- The Love Brand (1923) - Peter Collier
- The Huntress (1923) - John Gladding
- The Drivin' Fool (1923) - Howard Grayson
- A Man's Mate (1924) - Monsieur Bonard
- Captain Blood (1924) - Col. Bishop
- The Beloved Brute (1924) - Fat Milligan
- On Thin Ice (1925) - Harrison Breen
- The Happy Warrior (1925) - Mr. Letham
- Perils of the Rail (1925) - Pepper Martin
- Hell-Bent for Heaven (1926) - Matt Hunt - Sid's Father
- The Belle of Broadway (1926) - Major Anstruthers - an Old Beau
- Marriage License? (1926) - Judge (uncredited)
- Oh, What a Night! (1926) - Dean Simpson
- Tongues of Scandal (1927) - Mr. Collett
- Tracked by the Police (1927) - Tom Bradley
- The Bush Leaguer (1927) - Stokes
- The Fourflusher (1928) - Mr. Stone
- The Terrible People (1928, Serial) - Godley Long
- Captain Careless (1928) - John Forsythe
- The Trial of Mary Dugan (1929) - Judge Nash
- The Girl Who Wouldn't Wait (1929) - Warden
- No More Children (1929) - Judge Stanton
- Port of Dreams (1929) - Judge
- Street Girl (1929) - Man with Prince Nicholaus (uncredited)
- The Dude Wrangler (1930) - The 'Snorer'
- Beau Ideal (1931) -French Officer (uncredited)
- Private Lives (1931) - Sibyl's Wedding Escort (uncredited)
- Red-Headed Woman (1932) - Judge at Divorce Hearing (uncredited)
- The Widow in Scarlet (1932) - Pete's pal
- Unashamed (1932) - Judge Ambrose
- The Washington Masquerade (1932) - Judge Sampson (uncredited)
- Penguin Pool Murder (1932) - Judge
- Cavalcade (1933) - Man Talking to Colonel (uncredited)
- Gabriel Over the White House (1933) - General #1 (uncredited)
- The Defense Rests (1934) - Silent Judge (uncredited)
- The Man Who Reclaimed His Head (1934) - Minor Role (uncredited)
- Love Me Forever (1935) - Minor Role (uncredited)
- The Black Room (1935) - Member of the Court (uncredited)
- Diamond Jim (1935) - Stockbroker (uncredited) (final film role)

=== Writer ===
- Betty, the Boy and the Bird (1916)
- The Kid (1916)
- Corianton: A Story of Unholy Love (1931)
