= Sydney Smith (composer) =

English pianist and composer

Sydney Smith (14 July 1839 – 3 March 1889) was an English pianist and composer in Victorian England.

== Life ==
Born in Dorchester, Dorset, Smith grew up in a family of musicians. His father, Fredrick William Sydney Smith (married to Helen Boyton), was the head of a music school and often gave concerts with his two sons Sydney and Boyton. Smith studied piano in Leipzig with Ignaz Moscheles and Louis Plaidy, cello with Friedrich Grützmacher, and composition with Julius Rietz. He returned to England in 1858, settling the following year in London, where he married Annie Birch and remained until his death, highly regarded as a teacher and composer. He died due to an illness and spent all his wealth in an attempt to fix it. He composed or transcribed about 400 works for the piano. These were extremely popular in salons in England in the 19th century, particularly the early works. Many pieces were issued both as solo pieces and as piano duets.

== Music ==
Smith's earliest compositions are piano accompaniments to three concertina pieces by Richard Blagrove. Apart from these, he composed only for solo piano until the last years of his life, when he also wrote a small handful of songs.

Amongst his best known works are

- Tarantelle brillante, Op. 8
- La Harpe aeolienne, Op. 11
- Lily of the Valley, Op. 14
- Le Jet d'eau, Op. 17
- Gaîeté de coeur, Op. 24
- Chanson russe, Op. 31
- The Fairy Queen, Op. 42
- I Puritani, Op. 85

He wrote many other morceaux de salon for piano solo and made many arrangements from popular operas. In addition to the works published under his own name, he also published a number of piano works under the names Paul Beaumont and Victor Delacour.

== Legacy ==
Le Jet d'eau was used as the theme for The Foley Family, a drama serial about the comic lives of a Dublin family, which ran on Radio Éireann (the former name of the Irish national radio service) from 1952 to the late 1960s. It was written by David Hayes and starred George Green and Peg Monaghan.
