= Kathleen Mavourneen =

1837 song by Frederick Crouch

English and German songbook composed by F. N. Crouch, readable pdf

"Kathleen Mavourneen" is a song written in 1837, composed by Frederick Crouch with lyrics by a Mrs. Crawford, whose first name is variously cited as Annie, Julia, Louise Macartney, Louise Matilda Jane, or Marion. Crouch is also sometimes incorrectly cited as the author of the song's lyrics. It was popular during the American Civil War. "Mavourneen" is a term of endearment derived from the Irish Gaelic mo mhuirnín, meaning "my beloved".

The Irish soprano Catherine Hayes (1818–1861)—the first Irish woman to sing at La Scala in Milan—learned "Kathleen Mavourneen" while training in Dublin. It became her signature tune during concerts, and she sang it for Queen Victoria and over 500 royal guests during a performance at Buckingham Palace in June 1849. The song gained popularity with American audiences as a direct result of Hayes's international concert tours between 1851 and 1856.

"Kathleen Mavourneen" plays a prominent role in Michael Shaara's American Civil War historical novel The Killer Angels and its film adaptation Gettysburg. Confederate Brigadier General Lewis A. Armistead recalls a dinner at the marital home of his best friend—the now-Union Major General Winfield Scott Hancock—at the U.S. Army garrison in Los Angeles, California, in 1861 (at which time Armistead was a major and Hancock a captain), and that the song was sung there that night. This was the night before Armistead and several other Southern officers were to depart for the Confederacy, having resigned their U.S. Army commissions. Armistead and Confederate Brigadier General Richard B. Garnett—who was also present at the dinner—go on to be killed and Hancock to be severely wounded as Armistead's and Garnett's brigades assault the position defended by Hancock's II Corps on Cemetery Ridge in Gettysburg during Pickett's Charge. During Gettysburg, "Kathleen Mavourneen" is sung once by an Irish tenor at the Confederate camp and thereafter is used frequently as a theme in Randy Edelman's musical score for the film.

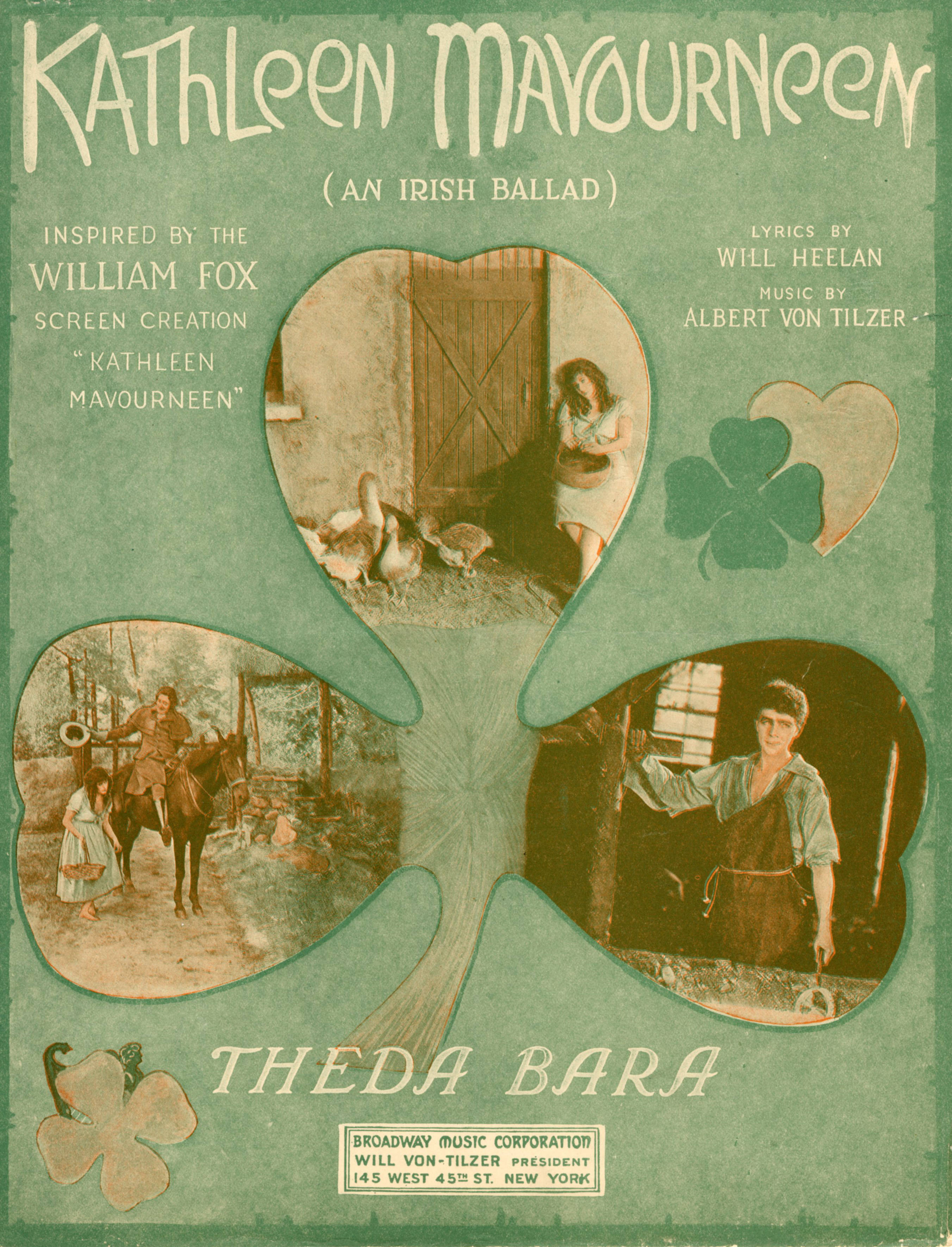
Sheet music cover inspired by the 1919 film

== Films ==
Several silent drama films were titled Kathleen Mavourneen. The first was produced in 1906, starring Kitty O'Neil, Walter Griswoll and H. L. Bascomb. Others were produced in 1911, 1913 and 1919, the last of these starring Theda Bara. At the release of the 1919 film, Irish and Catholic groups protested not only the depiction of Ireland but the use of a Jewish actress for the leading role. Fox Film Corporation pulled the film after several movie-theater riots and bomb threats. Two sound films with this title were produced, in 1930 and 1937.
