= Frederick Nicholls Crouch =

English composer and cellist

Frederick Crouch
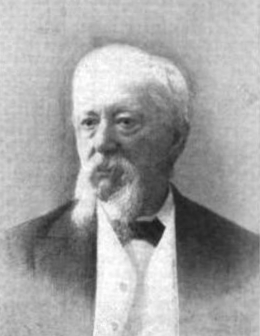
- Born: Frederick William Nicholls Crouch; 30 July 1808; Marylebone, London, United Kingdom
- Died: 18 August 1896 (aged 88); Portland, Maine, United States
- Burial place: Loudon Park Cemetery
- Occupations: Composer, cellist
- Children: 17, including Cora Pearl

Frederick William Nicholls Crouch (30 July 1808 – 18 August 1896) was an English composer and cellist.

== Early life and Civil War ==
Crouch was born in Marylebone in the city of Westminster, in London. He emigrated to the United States in 1841 and eventually settled in Richmond, Virginia. During the Civil War, Crouch took up arms for the Richmond Grays and the 1st Richmond Howitzers, Confederacy.

== Music career ==
Crouch was noted as a fine cellist, having played in the King's Theatre as well as St Paul's Cathedral in London, before relocating to the United States, but the majority of his compositions were not successful.

"Kathleen Mavourneen" for guitar songbook published in Baltimore by Samuel Carusi in 1845, readable pdf

English and German songbook for "Kathleen Mavourneen", readable pdf

His most famous song is "Kathleen Mavourneen". It inspired several films. Clara Mulholland wrote the novel Kathleen Mavourneen published in 1890. Marie Doran wrote the four act play Kathleen Mavourneen published in 1918. He set the poem Donna Dear a by the British poet Katherine Ashton Simpson to music.

During his years in the United States, Crouch composed two operas and unsuccessfully tried various musical undertakings (i.e., conducting, singing and teaching). Well traveled after the Civil War, Crouch eventually settled in Baltimore, Maryland.

He was married four times, and was the father of 17 children, including the famous French courtesan Cora Pearl.

He died on 18 August 1896 in Portland, Maine, and was buried on Confederate Hill in Baltimore's Loudon Park Cemetery.

=== Marriages and children ===
In 1832, he married the contralto Lydia Pearson in Plymouth.

1. Ciantha Jane Crouch (19 August 1833 – 1 March 1915), who married Henry Mawdsley, had five children, and moved to the United States.
2. William Crouch (18 October 1835 – ), died young
3. Eliza Emma Crouch (1 December 1836 – 8 July 1886), better known as Cora Pearl.
4. Hannah Lydia Crouch (30 November 1837 – ), died after 1851.
5. Charlotte Crouch (17 September 1839 – 1 April 1841), died young.
6. Louisa Elizabeth Crouch (23 February 1841 – 31 May 1918), married Paul Otto Shmaltz in Berlin, 1896.

He left his wife and children in April 1841, and moved back to London. In 1843, he went through a Roman Catholic marriage ceremony with Elizabeth 'Bessie' George. They had two sons.

In 1849, he left his second wife Bessie and moved to the United States where he married Jane A. Solomon. Together they had:

9. Walter Francis Crouch (1 May 1850 – 12 October 1923), married in 1879 to Maggie Stadtler. They had six children

10. Caroline "Carrie" Crouch (1867), a teacher, married in 1893 to William Brooks.

In 1870, he was married to Martha Elizabeth Vaughn (1845 – 1903). They had several children:

11. Jane Crouch (1 December 1870)

12. Junius Crouch (1 October 1871 – 3 February 1912)

13. Rose Crouch (20 September 1872 – 1930)

14. Blanche Crouch (3 June 1875 – 1900)

15. Ann Maria Crouch (4 February 1878 – 1910), married Charles Boston in 1897 and had a son.

16. Frederick William Crouch (31 March 1880 – 21 May 1950), married to Dorothy Sherry in 1907.

17. Thomas Crouch (31 March 1880 – 1 April 1880), died young.
