= Kenneth Casey =

American actor (1899–1965)

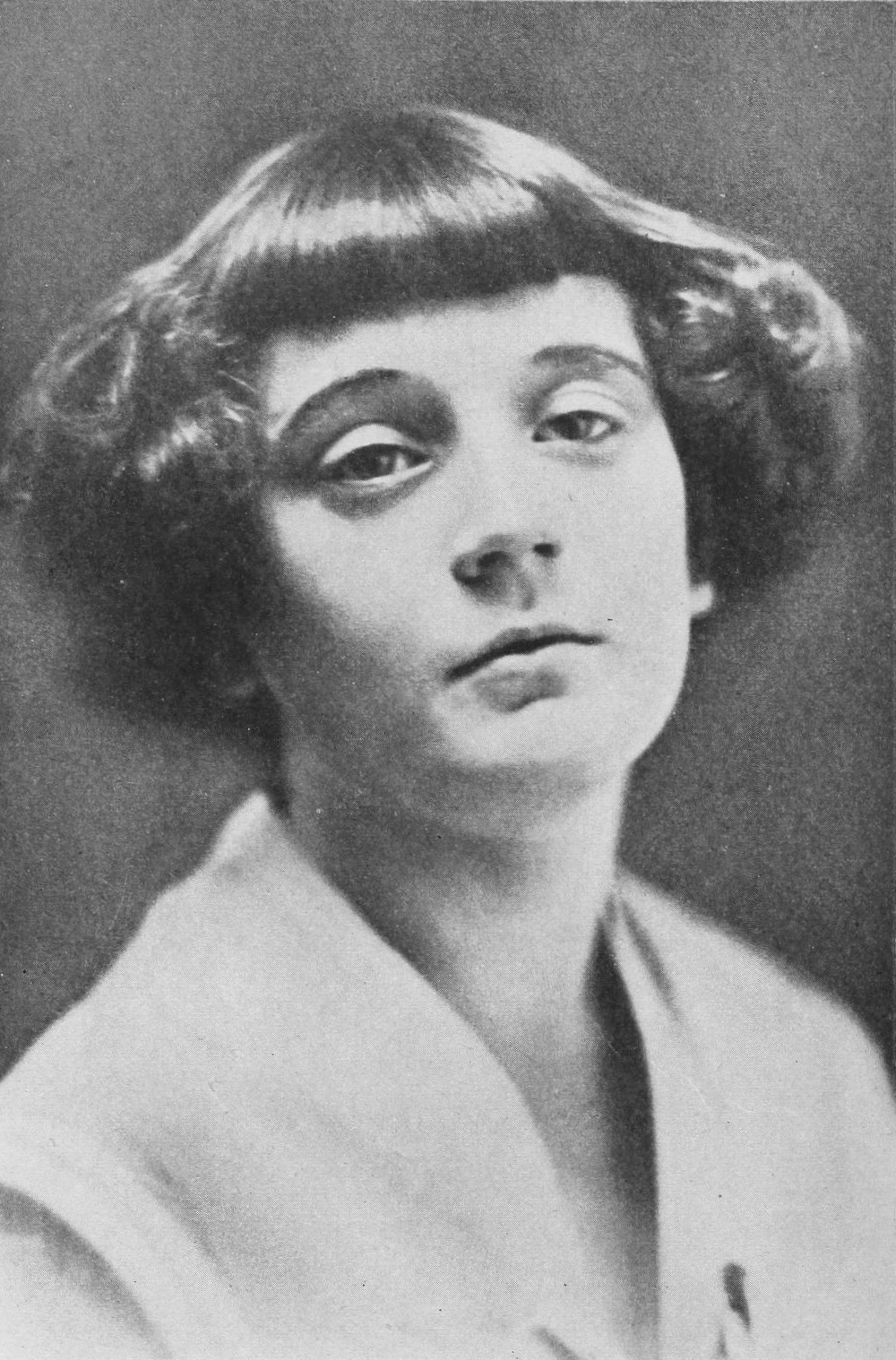
- Casey c. 1910
- Born: January 10, 1899; New York City, New York, U.S.
- Died: August 10, 1965 (aged 66); Cornwall, New York, U.S.
- Occupations: Child actor, composer, publisher, author

Kenneth Casey (January 10, 1899 – August 10, 1965) was an American composer, publisher, author, and child movie star in early silents.

== Biography ==
Born in New York City, Casey worked as a child actor in over thirty films for Vitagraph Studios between the years 1909 and 1913. He appeared with a young Moe Howard in the 1909 picture We Must Do Our Best. Howard later became famous as one of The Three Stooges.

As a songwriter, Casey is best remembered for writing the lyrics to "Sweet Georgia Brown", in 1925.

== Filmography ==
- We Must Do Our Best, directed by Van Dyke Brooke (1909)
- Mario's Swan Song (1910)
- Over the Garden Wall (1910)
- Chew Chew Land; or, The Adventures of Dolly and Jim (1910)
- Two Waifs and a Stray (1910)
- A Lunatic at Large (1910)
- Ransomed; or, A Prisoner of War (1910)
- The Children's Revolt (1910)
- Jean Goes Fishing (1910)
- Drumsticks (1910)
- A Tin-Type Romance (1910)
- The Misses Finch and Their Nephew Billy (1911)
- Consuming Love; or, St. Valentine's Day in Greenaway Land (1911)
- A Tale of Two Cities (1911)
- Mammy's Ghost (1911)
- A Little Lad in Dixie (1911)
- The Derelict Reporter (1911)
- Hungry Hearts; or, The Children of Social Favorites (1911)
- The Show Girl (1911)
- Barriers Burned Away (1911)
- The Clown's Best Performance (1911)
- The Long Skirt (1911)
- Cherry Blossoms (1911)
- The Child Crusoes (1911)
- Daddy's Boy and Mammy (1911)
- Wig Wag (1911)
- The Little Spy (1911)
- Captain Jenks' Dilemma (1912)
- How Tommy Saved His Father (1912)
- Father and Son (1912)
- Tom Tilling's Baby (1912)
- A Story of the Circus (1912)
- The Black Wall (1912)
- The Old Silver Watch (1912)
- The Man Under the Bed (1912)
- An Innocent Theft (1912)
- Fate's Awful Jest (1912)
- A Juvenile Love Affair (1912)
- Ingenuity (1912)
- Vultures and Doves (1912)
- Bumps (1912)
- The Higher Mercy, directed by William V. Ranous (1912)
- Three Girls and a Man, directed by Albert W. Hale (1912)
- The Eavesdropper, directed by James Young (1912)
- When Bobby Forgot, directed by Laurence Trimble (1913)
- Cutey and the Twins, directed by James Young (1913)
- The White Slave; or, The Octoroon, directed by James Young (1913)
- The Feudists, directed by Wilfrid North (1913)
- In the Shadow, directed by James Lackaye (1913)
- Heartease, directed by L. Rogers Lytton e James Young (1913)
- The Adventurer, directed by J. Gordon Edwards (1920)

== Bibliography ==
- John Holmstrom, The Moving Picture Boy: An International Encyclopaedia from 1895 to 1995, Norwich, Michael Russell, 1996, pp. 12–13.
