= Frances Miller =

American actress

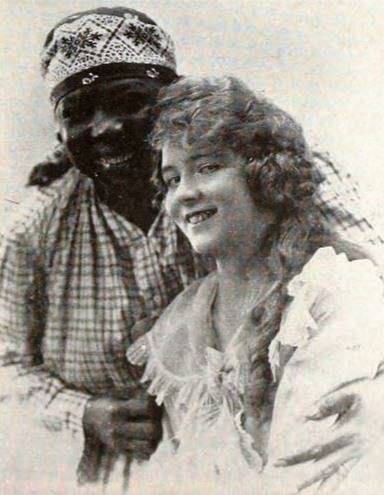
- Miller (left) with Gladys Leslie in The Mating (1918)
- Occupation: Actress
- Years active: 1911–1930
- Spouse: Larry Grant (m. 1918)

Frances Miller (sometimes credited as Frances Grant or Frances Miller Grant) was an American actress who worked extensively during Hollywood's silent era. Like many black actresses of her time, she was often cast in "mammy" roles.

== Biography ==
Miller may have been born in Kansas City, Missouri, and she later resided in Manhattan and Atlanta. She began appearing in films around 1911, although she may not have been credited for her earliest appearances. She seems to have retired by the early 1930s. She married Larry Grant in 1918, and had a son (who also appeared in films) named George Washington.

== Selected filmography ==
- Her Unborn Child (1930)
- The Dancer of Paris (1926)
- Scarlet Saint (1925)
- Gentle Julia (1923)
- The Leavenworth Case (1923)
- Sinner or Saint (1923)
- Counterfeit Love (1923)
- Sisters (1922)
- Cousin Kate (1921)
- Babs (1920)
- In Walked Mary (1920)
- Come Out of the Kitchen (1919)
- The Beloved Impostor (1918)
- The Mating (1918)
- Broken Ties (1918)
- Diamonds and Pearls (1917)
- Trouble Makers (1917)
- Adventures of Carol (1917)
- The Bondage of Fear (1917)
- The Tortured Heart (1916)
- The Warrens of Virginia (1915)
