= Frederick A. Thompson =

Frederick A. Thompson may refer to

- Frederick A. Thompson, the full name of the English playwright and librettist Fred Thompson
- Frederick A. Thompson, another spelling of the name of film director Frederick A. Thomson
