= I'm Going to Follow the Boys =

"I'm Going to Follow the Boys (Novelty Song)"
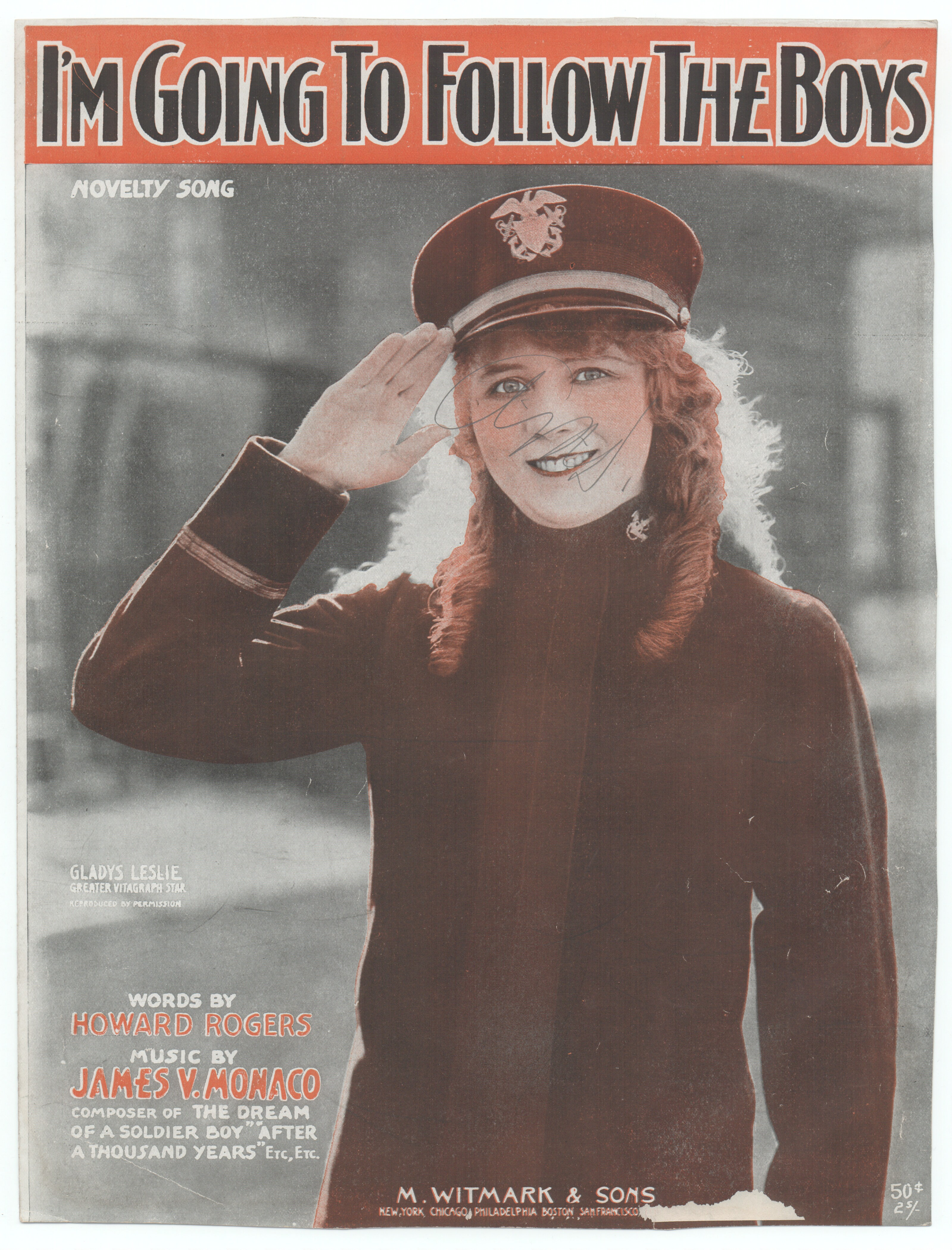
- Sheet music cover

Song
- Released: 1917
- Composer(s): James V. Monaco
- Lyricist(s): Howard Rogers

I'm Going to Follow the Boys (Novelty Song) is a World War I era song released in 1917. Howard Rogers wrote the lyrics and James V. Monaco composed the music. The song was published by M. Witmark & Sons in New York City.

On the cover of the sheet music, there is a photograph of American silent film actress, Gladys Leslie saluting, while dressed in uniform. She also performed the song.

The song is told from the first-person point of view of a woman who is used to being surrounded by boys. But because they're all fighting overseas in the war, she is lonely. To fix her problem, she comes up with a "great idea": to follow the boys to war. The chorus is as follows:

I'm going to follow the boys over there
Anywhere I don't care
I'm just dying for one little dance
But all my dancing partners are "Somewhere in France"
I've never nursed anyone I'll admit
But I'm strong to do my bit
And if one little kiss or more
Can help them win the war
Why I'm going to follow the boys!

The sheet music can be found at Pritzker Military Museum & Library.
