= The Dancer of Paris =

1926 lost film by Alfred Santell

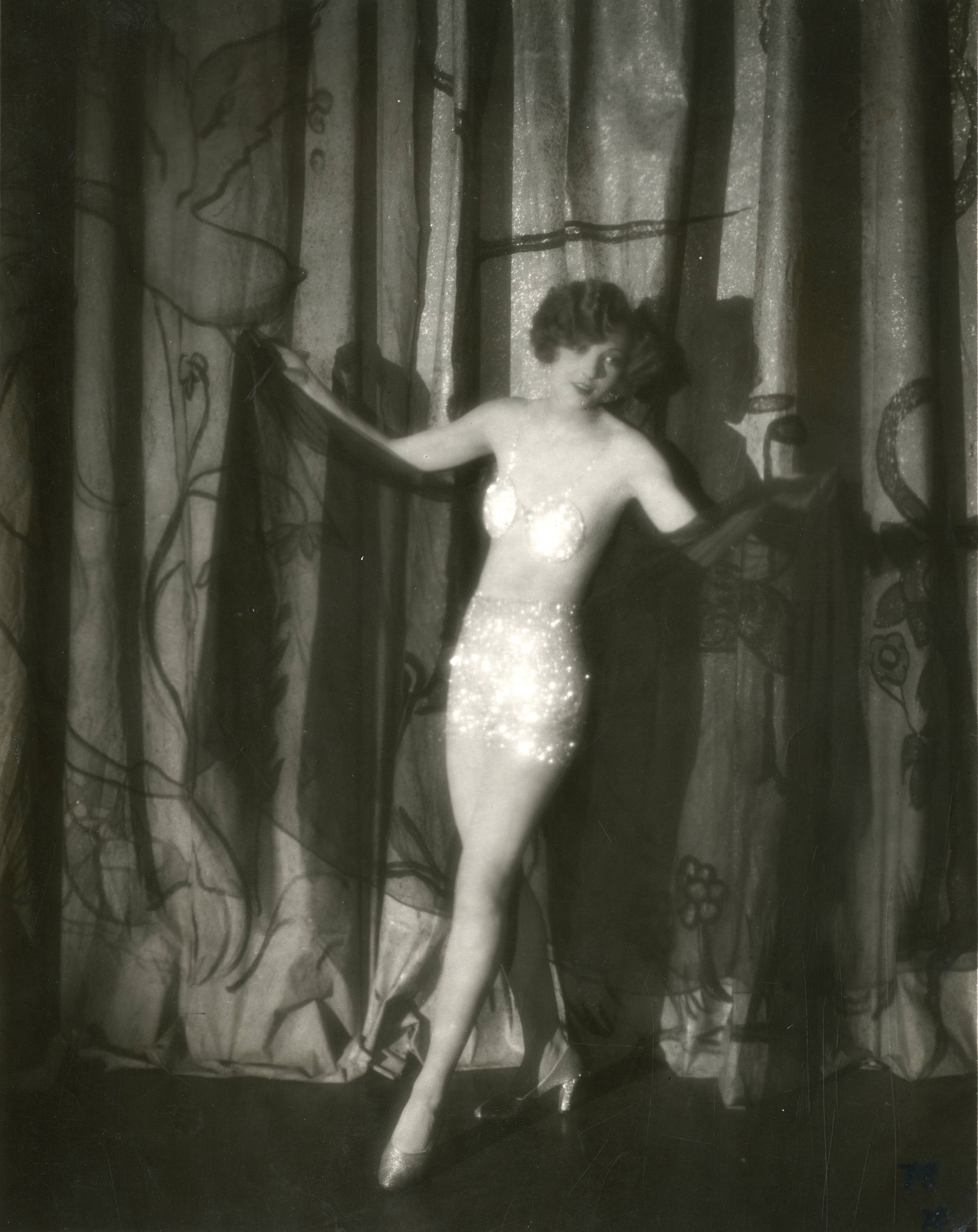
- Still with Mackaill
- Directed by: Alfred Santell
- Written by: Michael Arlen (story)
- Produced by: Robert Kane
- Starring: Dorothy Mackaill
- Cinematography: Ernest Haller
- Production company: First National Pictures
- Distributed by: First National Pictures
- Release date: February 28, 1926
- Running time: 70 minutes
- Country: United States
- Language: Silent (English intertitles)

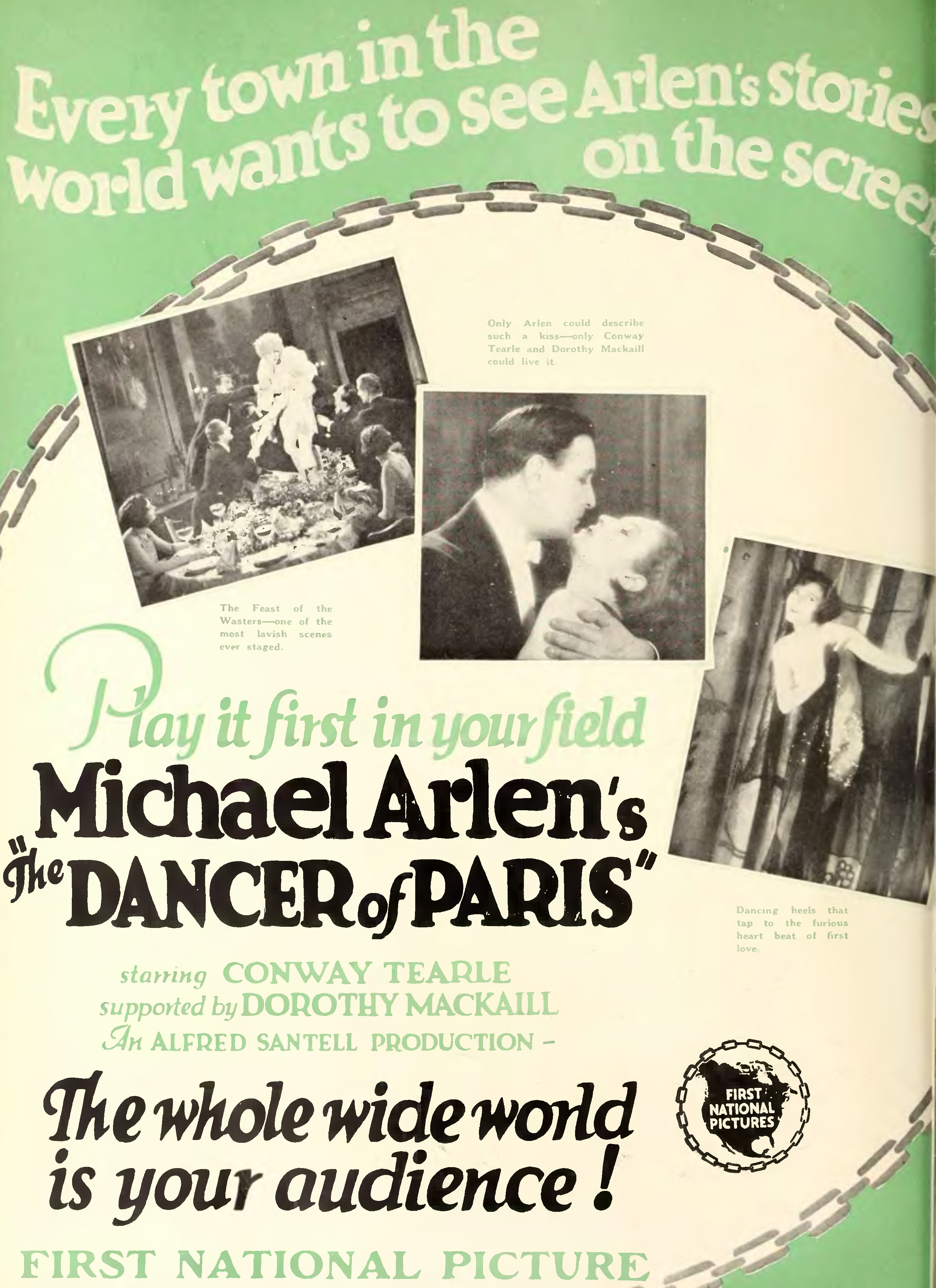
The Dancer of Paris ad in Motion Picture News, 1926

The Dancer of Paris is a lost 1926 American silent drama film produced and distributed by First National Pictures. It was directed by Alfred Santell and starred Dorothy Mackaill. A vintage movie trailer displaying short clips of the film still exists.

== Plot ==
As described in a film magazine review, Florida flapper Consuelo Cox accepts Sir Roy Martel's proposal, but then overhears him say that he does not really intend to marry her and discovers that his love for her is of the basest sort. She breaks her engagement and swears revenge, vowing to ruin him. Consuelo goes to Paris, becomes a professional dancer at the Boule Rouge, and obtains the apartment across from Sir Roy. At a bachelor party she performs at, the nude female statues suddenly come to life and join in the festivities. Consuelo falls in love with Noel Anson, a friend of her uncle's. Sir Roy, dying in his apartment, calls for her. She dances for him in a decidedly abbreviated costume until he passes, and then falls into the arms of Noel.

== Cast ==
- Conway Tearle as Noel Anson
- Dorothy Mackaill as Consuelo Cox
- Robert Cain as Sir Roy Martel
- Henry Vibart as Doctor Frank
- Paul Ellis as Cortez
- Frances Miller as Mammy (credited as Frances Miller Grant)

== Reception ==
Film reviews noted that Mackaill's dancer character was barely dressed at times, in one scene wearing just stones and beadwork and in the finale wearing only a loincloth, breastplate, and cloke, and then starting to remove this clothing. Because of this, like many American films of the time, The Dancer of Paris was subject to cuts by city and state film censorship boards. While the National Board of Review did not require any cuts, the film censor boards of Virginia required 6 cuts, Pennsylvania required 16 cuts, New York 5 cuts, Ohio 10 cuts, and Chicago 4 cuts. The reasons for the cuts varied; while Virginia cut scenes with nudity, Pennsylvania cut nude scenes and suggested drug use, cut or flashed suggestive scenes, and cut or reworded some intertitles. One intertitle changed by this state was from "You are obsessed by an insane desire to intrigue women—to make love to them—to hurt them," to the very different statement "You are obsessed by an insane desire to marry—when the state of your health positively forbids it."
