= Straight Is the Way (1921 film) =

1921 film

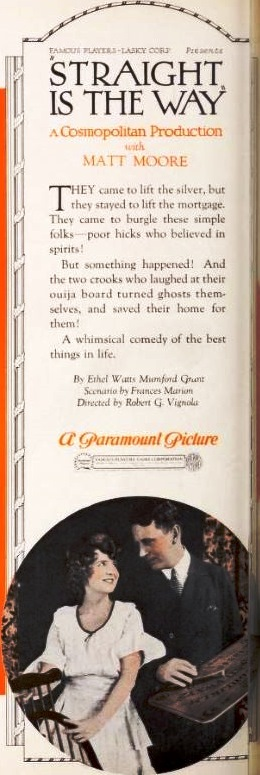
- Advertisement
- Directed by: Robert G. Vignola
- Screenplay by: Frances Marion; Ethel Watts Mumford
- Starring: Matt Moore; Mabel Bert; Gladys Leslie; George Parsons
- Cinematography: Al Liguori
- Production company: Cosmopolitan Productions
- Distributed by: Paramount Pictures
- Release date: March 6, 1921
- Running time: 50 minutes
- Country: United States
- Language: Silent (English intertitles)

Straight Is the Way is a surviving 1921 American silent comedy film directed by Robert G. Vignola, written by Frances Marion and Ethel Watts Mumford, and starring Matt Moore, Mabel Bert, Gladys Leslie, George Parsons, Henry Sedley, Van Dyke Brooke, and Emily Fitzroy. It was released on March 6, 1921, by Paramount Pictures.

The film depicts an aunt and niece in a treasure hunting expedition, in which their only guide are the supposed spirits of a Ouija board.

== Plot ==
An old woman and her niece, an orphan, consult a ouija board to locate a hidden treasure in order to save their mortgaged home.

== Cast ==
- Matt Moore as 'Cat' Carter
- Mabel Bert as Aunt Mehitabel
- Gladys Leslie as Dorcas
- George Parsons as 'Loot' Follett
- Henry Sedley as Jonathan Squoggs
- Van Dyke Brooke as Const. Whipple
- Emily Fitzroy as Mrs. Crabtree
- Peggy Parr as Bobby

== Preservation status ==
A copy of Straight Is the Way survives in the Library of Congress collection. Edward Lorusso produced a DVD of the film in 2021 with a music score by David Drazin.
