= Scarlet Saint =

1925 film

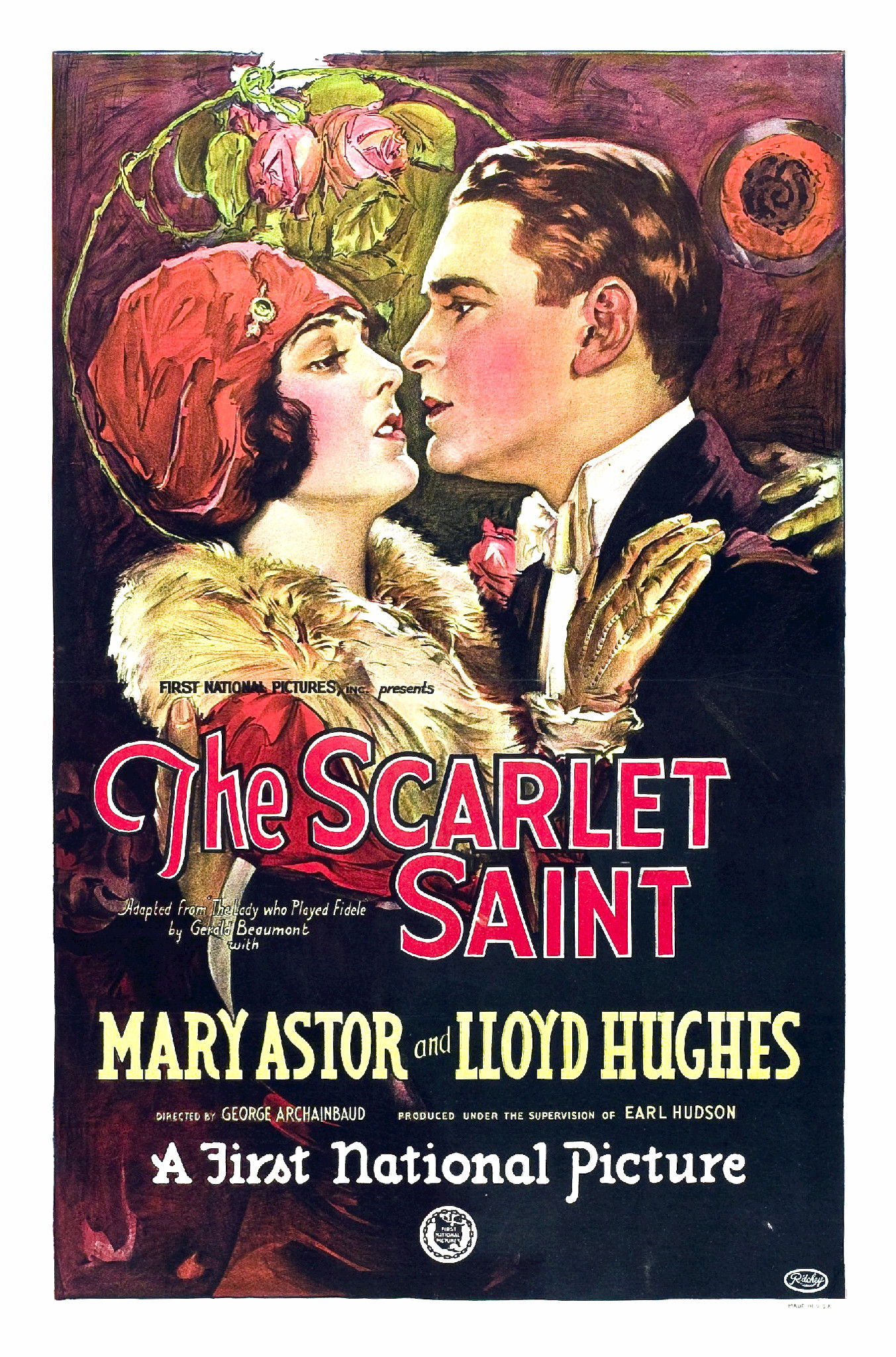
- Film poster
- Directed by: George Archainbaud
- Written by: Eugene Clifford; Jack Jungmeyer; John W. Krafft
- Produced by: Earl Hudson
- Starring: Mary Astor; Lloyd Hughes; Frank Morgan
- Cinematography: George J. Folsey
- Edited by: Arthur Tavares
- Production company: First National Pictures
- Distributed by: First National Pictures
- Release date: November 8, 1925
- Running time: 70 minutes
- Country: United States
- Language: Silent (English intertitles)

Scarlet Saint, also known as The Scarlet Sinner, is a 1925 American silent drama film directed by George Archainbaud and starring Mary Astor, Lloyd Hughes, and Frank Morgan.

The film's sets were designed by the art director Milton Menasco. It was adapted for the screen by Eugene Clifford and Jack Jungmeyer Jr. from the short story "The Lady Who Played Fidele" by Gerald Beaumont, which first appeared in Red Book in 1925.

== Plot ==
As described in a film magazine review, a young woman who as a girl was betrothed to an Austrian baron decides on the eve of the wedding that she cannot marry the titled man because she is in love with a young American. The baron tricks the other man into a duel and forces the woman into marriage to save the younger man from a long term in jail. After a long period of struggle to retain his wife, the baron at length releases her and wishes her happiness with the American.

== Cast ==
- Mary Astor as Fidele Tridon
- Lloyd Hughes as Philip Collett
- Frank Morgan as Baron Badeau
- Jed Prouty as Mr. Tridon
- John Raymond as Josef
- George Neville as The Trainer
- Frances Miller as Cynthia
- Wes Jenkins as Butler

== Preservation ==
Scarlet Saint is currently presumed lost. In February of 2021, the film was cited by the National Film Preservation Board on their Lost U.S. Silent Feature Films list.

== Bibliography ==
- Lowe, Denise. An Encyclopedic Dictionary of Women in Early American Films: 1895-1930. Routledge, 2014.
