= The Snitching Hour =

1922 film

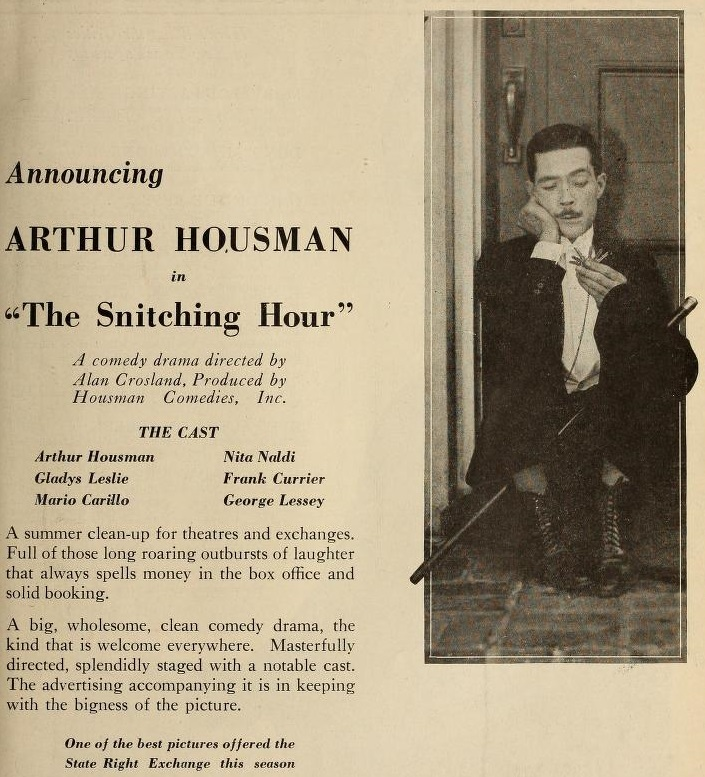
- Directed by: Alan Crosland
- Written by: Lewis Allen Browne; Joseph Farnham
- Produced by: Herbert L. Steiner
- Starring: Arthur Housman; Gladys Leslie; Nita Naldi
- Production company: Houseman Comedies
- Distributed by: Clark-Cornelius Corporation
- Release date: August 11, 1922
- Running time: 50 minutes
- Country: United States
- Language: Silent (English intertitles)

The Snitching Hour is a lost 1922 American silent comedy film directed by Alan Crosland and starring Arthur Housman, Gladys Leslie, and Nita Naldi.

== Cast ==
- Arthur Housman as Bunny
- Gladys Leslie as Lois Dickerson
- Frank Currier as Mr. Dickerson
- Nita Naldi as The 'Countess'
- George Lessey as Larry
- Mario Carillo

== Bibliography ==
- Monaco, James. The Encyclopedia of Film. Perigee Books, 1991.
