= An Amateur Orphan =

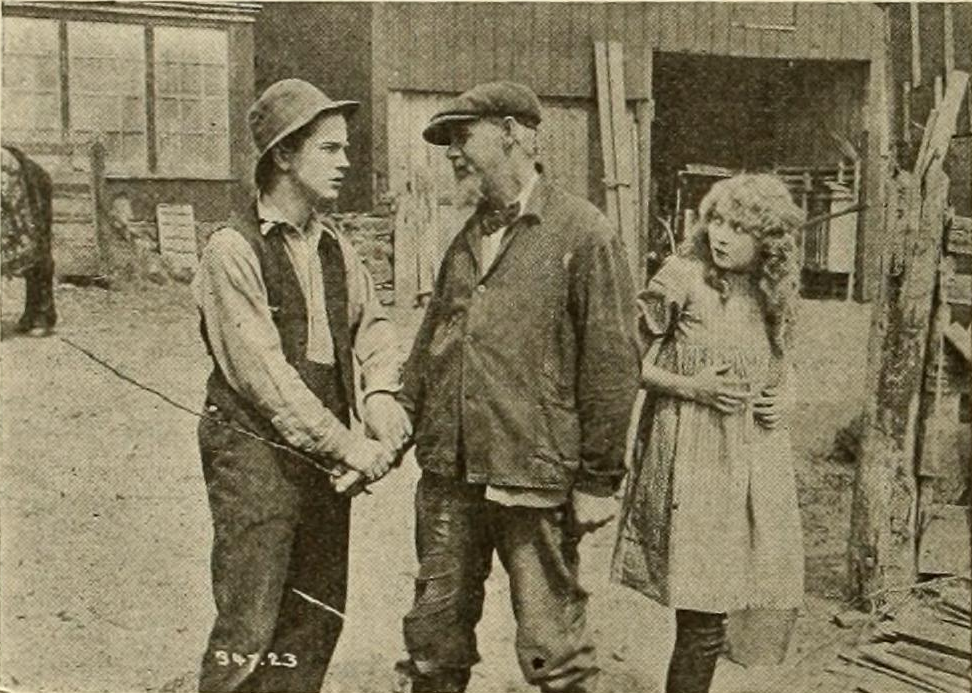
- Scene with Ray Hallor, Justus D. Barnes, and Gladys Leslie
- Directed by: Van Dyke Brooke
- Written by: Agnes Christine Johnston
- Produced by: Edwin Thanhouser
- Starring: Gladys Leslie
- Production company: Thanhouser Company
- Distributed by: Pathé Exchange
- Release date: June 3, 1917
- Running time: 5 reels
- Country: United States
- Languages: Silent film English intertitles

An Amateur Orphan is a 1917 American silent film starring Gladys Leslie. It was also the film debut for Chester Morris. Its survival status is currently unknown.

The screenplay was written by Agnes Christine Johnston specifically for Leslie. It was the first appearance of Leslie in a starring role after being dubbed the "girl with a million dollar style" for her performance in 1917's The Vicar of Wakefield.

== Plot ==
The review in Motography describes the plot:

Marcia Schuyler is a "poor little rich girl" who has everything but the companionship of other children. When her mother and father leave for Japan, Marcia begs her governess to allow her to exchange places with the latter's niece and to go to an orphan asylum instead of the finishing school selected by her parents. The governess, solicitous for her niece's welfare, agrees, and Marcia becomes an "amateur orphan".

After having a "lovely time" at the orphanage Marcia is adopted by a farmer's family. Into an atmosphere of gloom and misunderstanding Marcia brings her sunshiny spirit and straightens out many tangles. Then her parents return home unexpectedly and discover what has happened. Through an accident the record of Marcia's adoption is destroyed and her father offers a large reward for her discovery. Marcia's friend, Dave, the son of the family, thus wins a sufficient sum for an education.

Years later Dave has become a young business man. He loves Marcia and asks her to marry him. She promises to do so only if he will give up a city career and return to the farm so that at last she may have the sort of life she wishes.

== Cast ==
- Gladys Leslie as Marcia Schuyler
- Isabel Vernon as Quincy
- Thomas A. Curran as Marcia's father
- Jean Armour as Marcia's mother
- Chester Morris as Dick
- Ray Hallor as Dave Benton
- Justus D. Barnes as Dave's father
- Carey L. Hastings
- Grace DeCarlton
