= The Wonderful Thing =

1921 film by Herbert Brenon

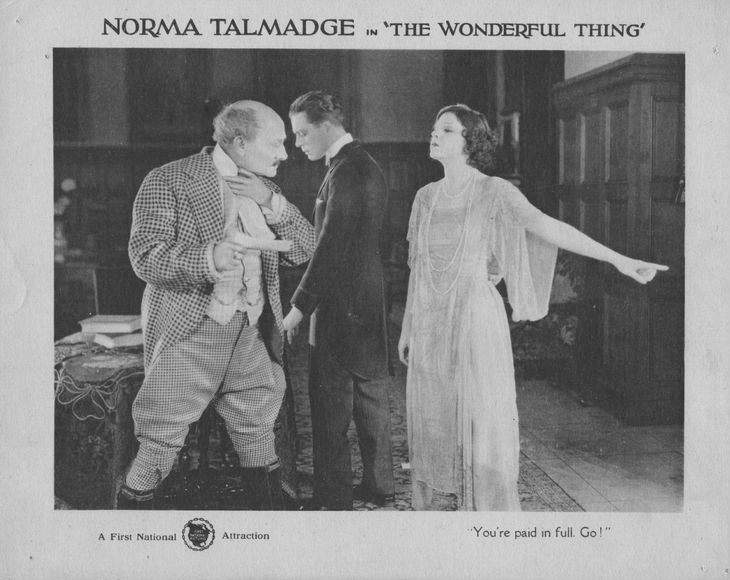
- Lobby card
- Directed by: Herbert Brenon
- Screenplay by: Clara Beranger; Herbert Brenon
- Based on: The Wonderful Thing by: Lillian Trimble Bradley; Forrest Halsey
- Starring: Norma Talmadge; Harrison Ford; Julia Hoyt; Howard Truesdale; Robert Agnew; Ethel Fleming
- Cinematography: J. Roy Hunt
- Production company: Norma Talmadge Film Corporation
- Distributed by: Associated First National Pictures
- Release date: November 7, 1921
- Running time: 70 minutes
- Country: United States
- Language: English

The Wonderful Thing is a 1921 American drama film directed by Herbert Brenon and written by Clara Beranger and Herbert Brenon. It is based on the 1920 play The Wonderful Thing by Lillian Trimble Bradley and Forrest Halsey. The film stars Norma Talmadge, Harrison Ford, Julia Hoyt, Howard Truesdale, Robert Agnew and Ethel Fleming. The film was released on November 7, 1921, by Associated First National Pictures.

== Cast ==
- Norma Talmadge as Jacqueline Laurentine Boggs
- Harrison Ford as Donald Mannerby
- Julia Hoyt as Catherine Mannerby
- Howard Truesdale as James Sheridan Boggs
- Robert Agnew as Laurence Mannerby
- Ethel Fleming as Dulcie Mannerby Fosdick
- Mabel Bert as Lady Sophia Alexandria Mannerby
- Fanny Burke as Angelica Mannerby
- Walter McEwen as 'Smooth Bill' Carser
- Charles Craig as General Lancaster

== Preservation ==
A complete print of The Wonderful Thing is held by the Library of Congress.

== See also ==
- The Wonderful Thing About Tiggers
