= J. Harrison Edwards =

Writer and film director active in the 1920s

J. Harrison Edwards was a writer and film director.

He established Franco-Canadian Industrial Film Company to produce "industrial" and educational films. In 1921 he was an organizer of Colored Feature Photoplay Inc.

His film Square Joe was filmed in Harlem with boxers Joe Jeanette and John Lester Johnson among the African American cast.

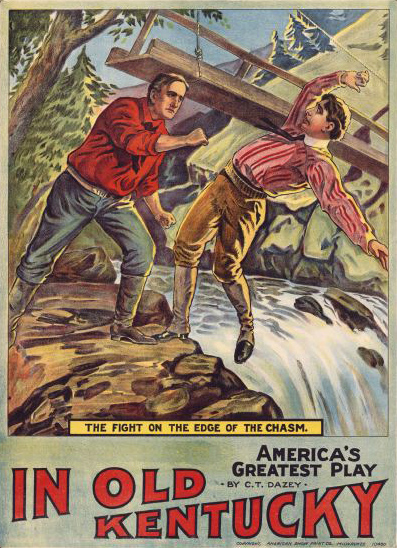
Color lithograph poster for "Charles Dazey's In Old Kentucky" (1893)

Charles T. Dazey, who authored In Old Kentucky, wrote the titles and was hired to "inject local color into the text" of the film The Fighting Kentuckians. A Sterling Feature Pictures release, its cast included Thornton Bastion, Irma Harrison, Myra Brooks, Tom Burroughs, Adele Kelly, Colen Chase, Pete Raymond, and May Wick.

== Filmography ==
- The Fighting Kentuckians (1920)
- Square Joe (1922)
- Love Wins
- Six Episodes of the Hidden Hand
- The Bride (1925), short film
- Playing the Ponies (1925) alt title?
