= We Must Do Our Best =

- Directed by: Van Dyke Brooke
- Starring: Kenneth Casey; Moe Howard
- Release date: 1909
- Country: United States
- Languages: Silent film English intertitles

We Must Do Our Best (1909) is an American black-and-white film which featured Kenneth Casey and the first ever appearance of Moe Howard from the Three Stooges (In the film he played the bully, known as Harry Horwitz). In the film, Harry smacks the main character in his lower extremity with a tennis racket and calls him an effeminate fruit loop.

== Cast ==
- Kenneth Casey
- Moe Howard - Bully (as Harry Moses Horwitz)
