= Edith Varian Cockcroft =

Edith Varian Cockcroft (February 6, 1881 – October 19, 1962) was a Brooklyn-born painter, designer, inventor and ceramist, who exhibited at venues including the Paris Salon, National Academy of Design and Art Institute of Chicago. She was known for portraits of nudes posed against vibrant fabric backdrops as well as landscape paintings, often depicting European seacoasts. She patented and exhibited silks and velvets, produced ceramic dinnerware and designed clothing and theater sets. Her artworks were lauded for "boldness of decorative pattern and fearless use of color" and for their "character and vigor." Among the customers for her garments were the performers Irene Castle and Jeanette MacDonald Edith typically signed her paintings and ceramics "E. Varian Cockcroft" or "Cockcroft," and it was reported in 1920 that her works "have such a strong masculine quality that she is generally thought to be a man." She was a member of the Société Nationale des Beaux Arts and the National Association of Women Painters and Sculptors, and she was a founding member of the New York Society of Women Artists.

== Biography ==
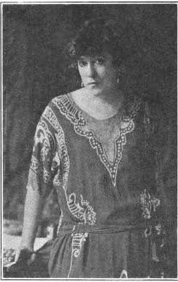
Edith Varian Cockcroft wearing one of her patented printed-silk blouses, published in The Woman's Journal, 1921

Her parents Robert Cockcroft (1847-1924) and Agnes E. Cockcroft (née Chase) (1846-1941), who lived at 202 Rodney Street in Brooklyn, were part of a prosperous family descended from early Dutch and Huguenot settlers in New York. Edith trained briefly with William Merritt Chase and started exhibiting by age 21. Early in her career, she sometimes called herself Edyth or Edythe. In the early 1900s, her parents moved to their 1890s country house at 703 Franklin Turnpike in Allendale, New Jersey By 1910, Edith had traveled and painted in France and England in the company of artists, including Andrew Dasburg, Florence Lucius (future wife of sculptor Jo Davidson) and W. Elmer Schofield and Murielle Schofield. Edith soon exhibited her canvases depicting Paris (Jardin du Luxembourg, Saint-Sulpice church), Brittany (Concarneau, Pont-Aven) and Cornwall (St. Ives, Newquay). She meanwhile had homes in Manhattan (her addresses over the years included 507 Madison Avenue, 21 MacDougal Alley and 2231 Broadway—alongside the Chase-founded arts academy later run by Frank Alvah Parsons). She married around 1914 to Charles Weyand (1867-1937), a mortgage broker in Allendale.

Starting around 1917, the couple ran Cockcroft Studios, a clothing and accessories workshop in Manhattan at 17 East 39th Street that generated about $50,000 a year in royalties. She had established it partly out of financial necessity; Charles's construction business had failed during World War I. Also known as Cockcroft Studio and Cockcroft Silk Co., it offered custom outfits called "personality gowns" as well as blouses, dresses, nightgowns, handbags, hats and parasols, in "illuminated fabrics", especially with batik on silk and velvet. The Prizma film company made a short color movie, "Gowns Venus Would Envy," about her batik techniques. In the 1920s, she and Charles patented dress and blouse fabric printing techniques under Patents 1,374,970A and 1,590,335A.

Her bestselling products were kits for making a "Cockcroft Illuminated Blouse," which cost about $7 each; the package contained a yard or so of printed silk (plus thread and trimmings), with dotted outlines for cutting out the neckline, sleeves and belt. The shirts were makeable in an hour or so, even by the "rankest amateur," according to the journalist Mildred Adams. The patterns were based on precedents such as ancient mosaics, sailors' tattoos, kimono, medieval tapestries, folk embroidery, Aztec reliefs and Egyptian tomb discoveries. They were marketed at department stores, including Filene's and B. Altman and Co., as a "silk sensation" that enabled women "to look artistic without looking freakish." Edith's blouses were worn by the performers Irene Castle, Jeanette MacDonald and Gladys Leslie, the composer Percy Grainger's mother Rose Grainger and the opera singer Jeanne Gordon.

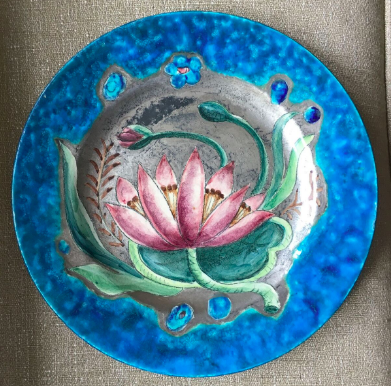
Typical dinner plate, circa 1940, by Edith Varian Cockcroft

By the 1930s, Edith and Charles had left the garment business and moved to their country home overlooking the Ramapo River in Sloatsburg, New York. Her pottery workshop there specialized in dinnerware with metallic glazes and foliage, floral, animal and Greek deity motifs. The New York Sun called her ceramics "modern and yet somehow romantic." In the 1950s, under the auspices of the artist DeWitt Peters, Edith introduced ceramics classes to the Centre d'Art in Haiti. She kept traveling and painting until shortly before her death, often working in watercolor, and depicting subjects including European hill towns, Haitian palm tree groves, Florida beaches and the Ramapo River’s banks. She died in Sloatsburg and is buried alongside her parents and her sister Fannie Carver (1869-1939) and brother-in-law Wallace Carver (1863-1921) at Valleau Cemetery in Ridgewood, New Jersey.

== Exhibitions ==
Before World War I, Edith exhibited paintings in Paris at the Salon d'Automne (1909-1911), the International Art Union (1909), Salon des Indépendants (1910) and the Société Nationale des Beaux-Arts (1909, 1911) and in London at the Anglo-American Exposition (1914). At the 1909 Salon, the collector Ivan Morozov acquired her view of Concarneau in snow (now at the Pushkin State Museum of Fine Arts in Moscow). In New York, she was a frequent exhibitor at the National Academy of Design (1908, 1910-1915), New York Water Color Club (1910, 1914-1916), National Association of Women Painters and Sculptors (1914-1916, 1926, 1928, 1930) and New York Society of Women Artists (1926–31, 1934, 1936). Her other New York venues included Folsom Galleries (1916), G.R.D. Studio (founded in memory of the artist Gladys Roosevelt Dick, a cousin of Theodore Roosevelt through her father John Ellis Roosevelt) (1929, 1930), Macbeth Gallery (1915), MacDowell Club (1915), Montross Gallery (1916), Reinhardt Galleries (1915), Salons of America (1925), Society of Independent Artists (1917) and Catherine Lorillard Wolfe Art Club (1915). The Pennsylvania Academy of the Fine Arts displayed her work in several annual exhibitions (1910, 1911, 1913-1915, 1930). Edith also showed paintings at Albright Art Gallery, Buffalo (1910), Art Institute of Chicago (1914), Baltimore Water Color Club (1910), Carnegie International (1909, 1927), Corcoran Gallery of Art (1914-1915, 1928), Detroit Institute of Arts (1928), Panama-Pacific International Exposition (1915), Philadelphia Water Color Club (1909, 1915), Rhode Island School of Design (1917), Rochester Memorial Art Gallery (1914), Rockland Center for the Arts (1961), St. Louis Art Museum (1910, 1914), Toledo Museum of Art (1928), Vassar College’s Taylor Hall (1928) and the Village Studio Guild in Ogunquit, Maine (1921). Critics and artists who lauded her paintings included Hamilton Easter Field and Forbes Watson. James Huneker described one of her St. Ives views as “fresh and interesting” and noted that her nudes “shocked the conservative.” Among the reviewers who mistook her for a man was Guy Pène du Bois, who described her as an artist of portraits showing “that the spirit of the new art had at least knocked at his studio door, even if not convincingly.”

Her textiles and ceramics were displayed at the Art Institute of Chicago (1921), Brooklyn Museum (1926, 1937) and Montross Gallery (1937). In the 1930s, she designed sets and interiors and displayed paintings, ceramics and textiles at the County Theatre arts complex in Suffern, New York. She was a friend of the agrarian philosopher Ralph Borsodi, and she occasionally worked on County Theatre sets with Borsodi.

== Legacy ==
Her paintings at museums include Concarneau en blanc at the Pushkin State Museum of Fine Arts in Moscow (inventory #3383) and The Circus is in Town (also known as The Circus Comes to Town and The Circus Comes to Provincetown) at the Hunter Museum of American Art in Chattanooga, Tennessee. Two of her head-shaped vases are at Naumkeag in Stockbridge, Massachusetts. A few private collectors have published their examples of her work The Grainger Museum in Melbourne, Australia, owns two batik silk blouses and a pleated skirt made by Edith (accession numbers 04.5018, 04.5052 and 04.5068) plus Rose Grainger’s receipts for the garments. Edith’s 20-page clothing catalog, “Cockcroft Studio Silks of Distinction,” is in the Lawrence B. Romaine Trade Catalog Collection at University of California, Santa Barbara, and digitized in Adam Matthew’s “Trade Catalogues and the American Home” database. Edith’s letters, and correspondence mentioning her, survive in archives at the Brooklyn Museum (1928 Carnegie International loan show) and at the Smithsonian’s Archives of American Art in records for the G.R.D. Studio, Carnegie Institute (series 1, box 36, file 33), Richard York Gallery (series 2, box 14, folder 70), Walter Elmer Schofield (reel 5043, 19 October 1909) and Andrew Dasburg and Grace Mott Johnson (series 1, box 1, folder 25, frames 4, 14 and 16, and series 2, box 7, folder 32, frame 54, and box 8, folder 31, frame 56). Edith’s philanthropist cousins, the sisters Mary Thurston Cockcroft and Elizabeth Varian Cockcroft, collected art and helped support Edith. The sisters’ gifts belong to the Brooklyn Museum (artworks by [Edward Hopper and Mary Cassatt, accession numbers 46.102 through .107; Etruscan scarabs, 46.156.2 through .4; Japanese and Chinese vases; Islamic ceramic jars, 42.109.1 to .3); Metropolitan Museum of Art (17th-century Italian lace, American silver vessels, 28.88.1a,b through 28.88.5); and the American Museum of Natural History (an 87-carat emerald, Persian Gulf and American pearls weighing 50 grains each, Egyptian amethysts, Chinese jade and rock crystal). Cockcroft family gifts of coins are at the American Numismatic Society (accession numbers mostly 1929.59.1 through .58), and their silver vessels, jewelry and textiles are at the Cooper Hewitt and the Museum of the City of New York.
