= Pearl of Love =

1925 film

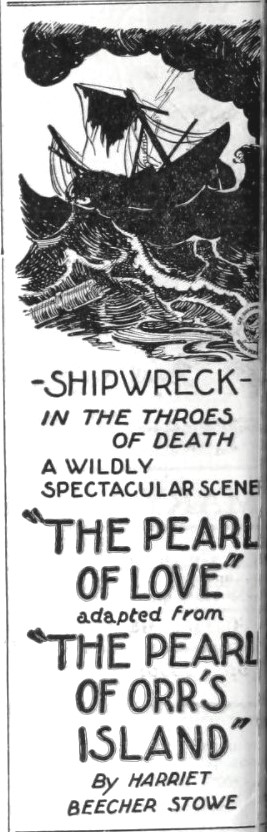
- Advertisement
- Directed by: Leon Danmun
- Based on: The Pearl of Orr’s Island, A Story of the Coast of Maine by Harriet Beecher Stowe
- Starring: Betty Balfour; Gladys Leslie; Burr McIntosh
- Production company: Paul W. Whitcomb Productions
- Distributed by: Lee-Bradford Corporation
- Release date: December 5, 1925
- Running time: 6 reels
- Country: United States
- Language: Silent (English intertitles)

Pearl of Love is a 1925 American silent drama film directed by Leon Danmun and starring Betty Balfour, Gladys Leslie, and Burr McIntosh. It is based upon a novel by Harriet Beecher Stowe.

== Plot ==
As described in a film magazine review, little Mara finds a boy and his mother lashed to a raft. Mara's grandfather adopts the boy, who later grows up and comes to love Mara and becomes a shipbuilder. When he turns to smuggling, he later is converted by his love of Mara to go straight.

== Cast ==
- Gladys Leslie as Mara
- Burr McIntosh as Captain Kittridge
- Russell Griffin as Sea Waif
- Effie Shannon as Mrs. Kittridge
- Raymond Lowney as Moses
- Charles Lane as Captain Pinnel
- Alice Chapin as Mrs. Pinnel
- Walter Gilbert as Ned Train
- Paul Winchell as Atkinson
- Aleta Dore as Sally Kittridge
- Joseph Selman as Mr. Adams
- Dorothy Allen

== Preservation ==
With no prints of Pearl of Love located in any film archives, it is a lost film.

== Bibliography ==
- Ken Wlaschin. The Silent Cinema in Song, 1896-1929: An Illustrated History and Catalog of Songs Inspired by the Movies and Stars, with a List of Recordings. McFarland & Company, 2009. ISBN 978-0-7864-3804-4
