= Broadway Broke =

1923 silent film

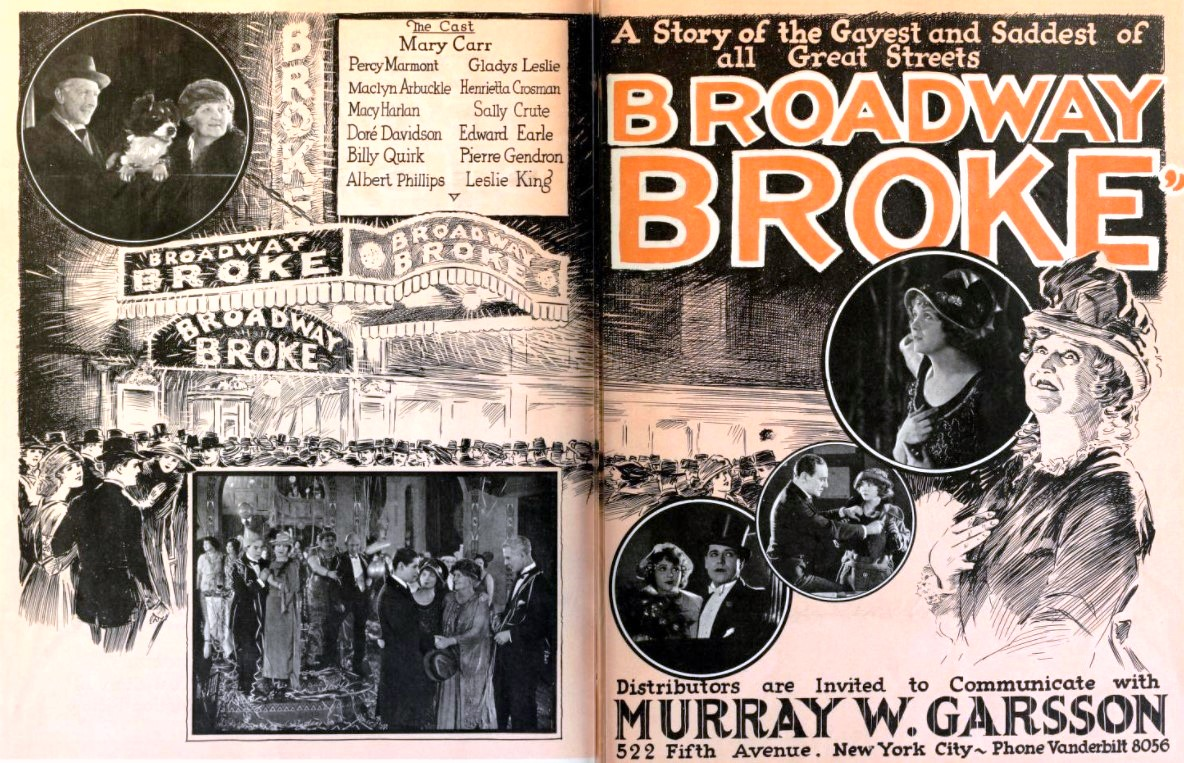
- Directed by: J. Searle Dawley
- Written by: John Lynch
- Based on: "Broadway Broke" by Earl Derr Biggers
- Produced by: Murray W. Garsson
- Starring: Mary Carr; Percy Marmont; Gladys Leslie
- Cinematography: Bert Dawley
- Production company: Murray W. Garsson Productions
- Distributed by: Selznick Distributing Corporation
- Release date: October 27, 1923
- Running time: 60 minutes
- Country: United States
- Language: Silent (English intertitles)

Broadway Broke is a 1923 American silent drama film directed by J. Searle Dawley and starring Mary Carr, Percy Marmont, and Gladys Leslie. A struggling former Broadway actress tries to restart her career by turning to playwriting.

== Cast ==
- Mary Carr as Nellie Wayne
- Percy Marmont as Tom Kerrigan
- Gladys Leslie as Mary Karger
- Dore Davidson as Lou Gormam
- Macklyn Arbuckle as P.T. Barnum
- Macey Harlam as Claude Benson
- Edward Earle as Charles Farrin
- Pierre Gendron as Jack Graham
- Billy Quirk as Joe Karger
- Henrietta Crosman as Madge Foster
- Sally Crute as Augusta Karger
- Leslie King as Mark Twain
- Albert Phillips as General Grant
- Frederick Burton as Augustin Daly

== Preservation ==
- No prints survive which makes this a lost film.

== Bibliography ==
- Munden, Kenneth White. The American Film Institute Catalog of Motion Pictures Produced in the United States, Part 1. University of California Press, 1997.
