= Miss Dulcie from Dixie =

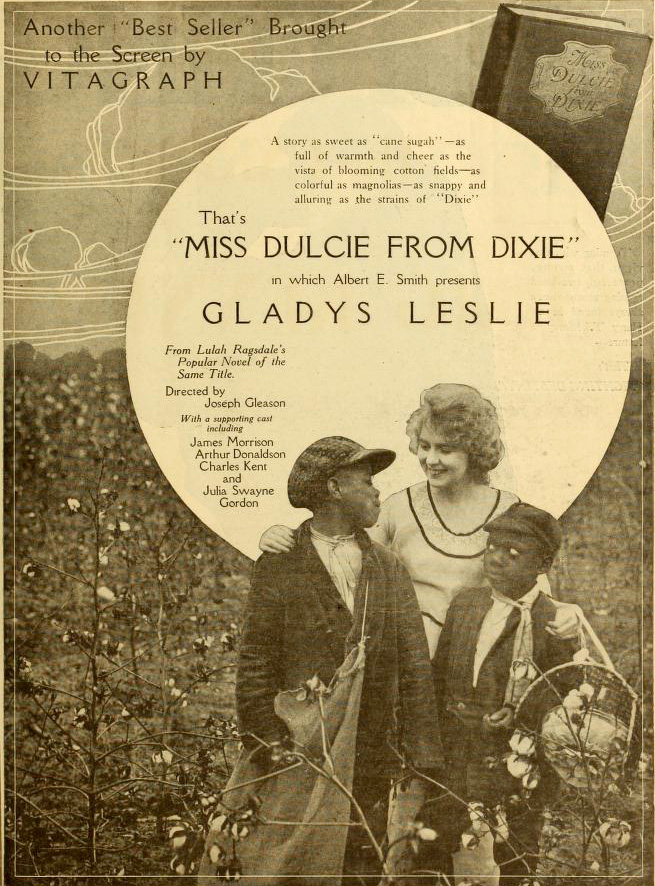
- Advertisement for Miss Dulcie from Dixie in the Moving Picture World April 1919 issue
- Directed by: Joseph Gleason
- Written by: G. Marion Burton
- Based on: Miss Dulcie from Dixie by Lulah Ragsdale
- Starring: Gladys Leslie; Charles Kent; Arthur Donaldson; Julia Swayne Gordon; James W. Morrison
- Cinematography: Jules Cronjager
- Production company: Vitagraph Company of America
- Distributed by: Vitagraph Company of America
- Release date: March 24, 1919
- Running time: 5 reels
- Country: United States
- Languages: Silent film (English intertitles)

Miss Dulcie from Dixie is a 1919 American silent drama film directed by Joseph Gleason and starring Gladys Leslie, Charles Kent, Arthur Donaldson, Julia Swayne Gordon, and James W. Morrison. It is based on the 1917 novel of the same name by Lulah Ragsdale. The film was released by Vitagraph Company of America on March 24, 1919.

== Cast ==
- Gladys Leslie as Dulcie Culpepper
- Charles Kent as Colonel Culpepper
- Arthur Donaldson as Uncle John
- Julia Swayne Gordon as Aunt John
- James W. Morrison as Orrin Castleton

== Preservation ==
The film is now considered lost.
