= A Helpful Sisterhood =

- Directed by: Van Dyke Brooke
- Written by: Margaree P. Dryden (story)
- Starring: Norma Talmadge, Mary Maurice and Marie Weirman
- Release date: March 31, 1914
- Country: United States
- Language: English

A Helpful Sisterhood is a 1914 American film directed by Van Dyke Brooke.

== Cast ==
- Norma Talmadge as Mary
- Mary Maurice as Grandmother
- Marie Weirman as Sophie
- Marie Tener as Louise
- Mary Anderson as Alice
- Leo Delaney as Detective
- Van Dyke Brooke as Mr. Vardon
- Arthur Cozine as John
- Cortland Van Deusen as Bert
- Ernest Cozzens
