= The Kentuckians =

1898 novel with two film adaptations

The Kentuckians is an 1898 novel by John Fox Jr. It was adapted into two films: first as The Fighting Kentuckians in 1920, then as The Kentuckians in 1921.

== Novel ==
Cover of The Kentuckians

The novel was written by John Fox Jr. and published in 1898. The story contrasts a mountain man and a wealthy flatlander competing for the same love interest. The book was reprinted as The Kentuckians, A Knight of the Cimberland. W. T. Smedley illustrated it.

It was Fox's first novel. Fox lived in Big Stone Gap and had a successful writing career.

== 1920 film ==
Sterling Feature Pictures adapted the novel as The Fighting Kentuckians in 1920. The film was directed by J. Harrison Edwards with Thornton Baston, Irma Harrison, Myra Brooks, Tom Burroughs, Adele Kelly, Colen Chase, Pete Raymond and May Wick. The author of In Old Kentucky, Charles T Dazey, helped write the titles. At least part of the film was reportedly shot on location with locals.

== 1921 film ==
The Kentuckians is a lost 1921 American silent drama film directed by Charles Maigne and written by Frank Tuttle based upon the novel of the same name by John Fox, Jr. The film stars Monte Blue, Wilfred Lytell, Diana Allen, Francis Joyner, J.H. Gilmour, John Miltern, and Thomas S. Brown. The film was released on February 20, 1921, by Paramount Pictures.

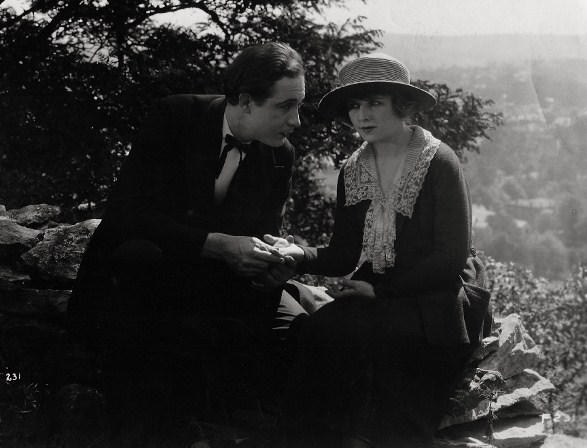
Monte Blue and Diana Allen in the 1921 film

=== Cast ===
- Monte Blue as Boone Stallard
- Wilfred Lytell as Randolph Marshall
- Diana Allen as Anne Bruce
- Francis Joyner as Mace Keaton
- J. H. Gilmour as Governor
- John Miltern as Colton
- Thomas S. Brown as Jake Stallard
- J. W. Johnston as Boone's Brother
- Russell Parker as Constable
- John Carr as Young Keaton
- Albert Hewitt as Young Stallard
- Eugenie Woodward as Ma Stallard
- Wes Jenkins as Uncle Cadmus
- Grace Reals as Mrs. Marshall
