= Wild Primrose =

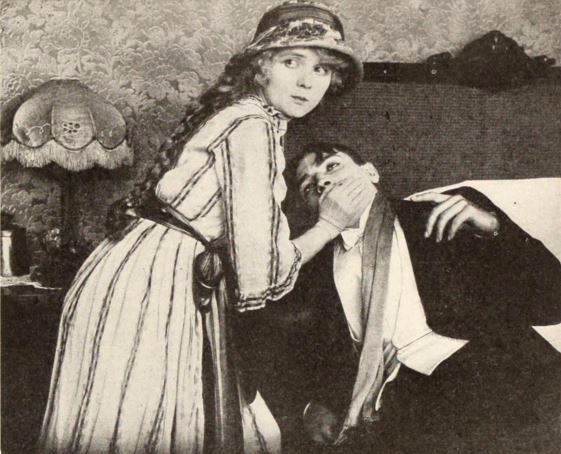
- A still of Wild Primrose with Gladys Leslie
- Directed by: Frederick A. Thomson
- Written by: Van Powell (scenario)
- Story by: Joseph F. Poland
- Starring: Gladys Leslie; Richard Barthelmess; Eulalie Jensen; Charles Kent; Claude Gillingwater
- Production company: Vitagraph Company of America
- Distributed by: V-L-S-E, Incorporated
- Release date: August 12, 1918
- Running time: 5 reels
- Country: United States
- Languages: Silent film (English intertitles)

Wild Primrose is a 1918 American silent drama film directed by Frederick A. Thomson and starring Gladys Leslie, Richard Barthelmess, Eulalie Jensen, Charles Kent, and Claude Gillingwater. The film was released by V-L-S-E, Incorporated on August 12, 1918.

== Cast ==
- Gladys Leslie as Primrose Standish
- Richard Barthelmess as Jack Wilton
- Eulalie Jensen as Marie
- Charles Kent as Williams
- Claude Gillingwater as Standish
- Ann Warrington as Emily
- Arthur Lewis as Griff
- Bigelow Cooper as Newton
- Gladys Valerie

== Preservation ==
The film is now considered lost.
