= The Locket; or When She Was Twenty =

- Directed by: Frederick A. Thomson
- Produced by: Vitagraph Studios
- Starring: John Bunny
- Distributed by: General Film Company
- Release date: February 22, 1913
- Running time: short
- Country: United States
- Languages: Silent; English titles

The Locket; or When She Was Twenty is a 1913 silent short comedy directed by Frederick A. Thomson and starring John Bunny and Flora Finch. It was produced by the Vitagraph Company.

== Cast ==
- John Bunny as Judge Jones
- Flora Finch as Mrs. Jones
- Leah Baird as Mrs. Jenkins
- Robert Gaillard as Mr. Jenkins
- Charles Eldridge as Father-in-Law
- Mary Maurice as Mother-in-Law

== Preservation ==
Prints survive in UCLA and Library of Congress.
