= Mabel Bert =

American actress (1862–1945)

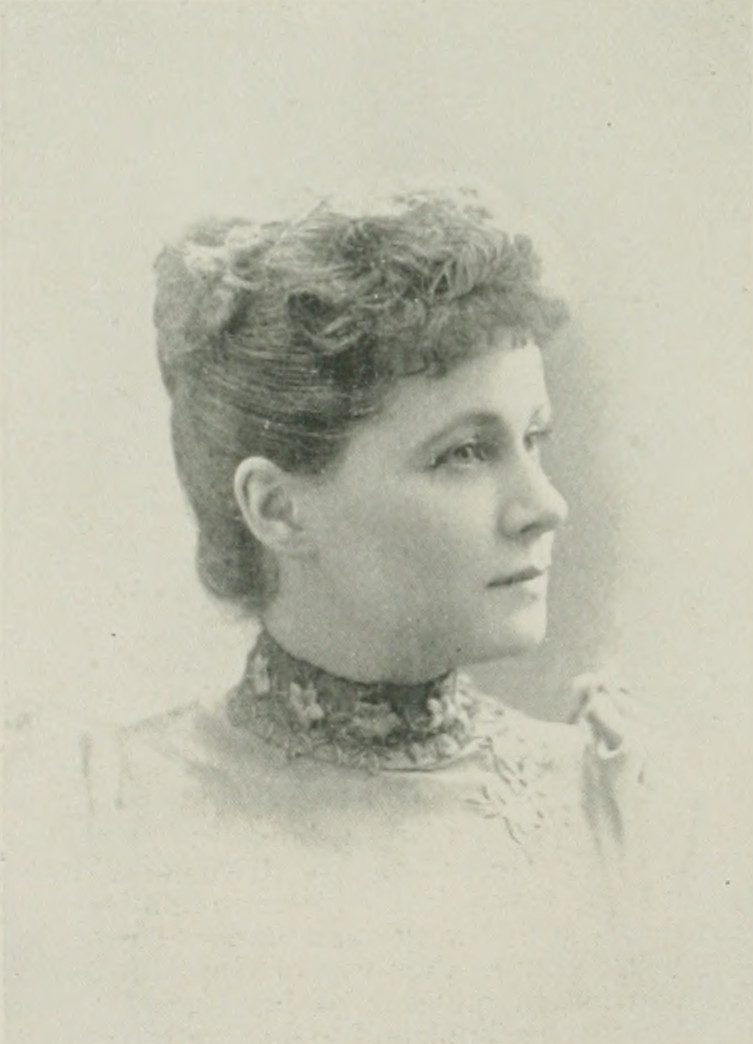
- Born: Mabel Scott; 1862; Australia
- Died: September 7, 1945 (aged 82–83)
- Occupation: Actress
- Spouses: Edward G. Bert; Forrest Robinson
- Partner: McKee Rankin
- Children: Doris Rankin

Mabel Bert (née Scott, 1862–1945) was an Australian-born American actress Mabel was an actress who was in stage productions including Straight Is the Way (1921), The Wonderful Thing (1921) and Blackbirds (1920).

== Early life ==
Bert was born in Australia in 1862. Her father was A.C. Scott whose family was very wealthy. They immigrated to the United States in 1865, settling in San Francisco, California to allow Mabel better schooling. She was educated in Mills Seminary in Oakland, California.

== Career ==
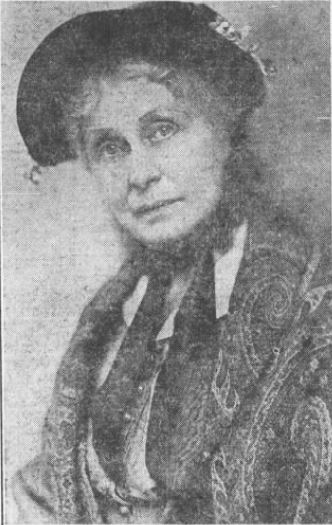
Mabel Bert in Turn to the right

She started as an actress by chance. She was behind the scenes with a friend during the performance of Oliver Twist and was asked at the last minute to replace a missing actress who had three lines.

At the beginning of her career, she played with various companies throughout California for two years and in 1886 joined a stock company in San Francisco for leading parts. For 14 months she took a new part every week, including Shakespeare's plays, old comedies, melodramas, society plays and burlesques. In 1887, she went east and joined one of Frohman Brothers' companies in Held by the Enemy. Since that time, Bert took leading parts in various plays and appeared in all of the important cities of the U.S. She played leads for the John A. Stevens Company at the old Grand Opera House, San Francisco.

== Personal life ==
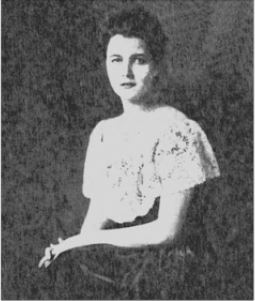
Doris Rankin

She left school when she was 17 years old, and on 25 May 1879, she married Edward G. Bert, theatrical manager working for his brother, Fred Bert, a pioneer theater man of Oakland. She made her debut on the stage in 1880.

In 1887, she began an affair with Arthur McKee Rankin and became pregnant. She gave birth to a baby girl, Doris Rankin, who later married Lionel Barrymore, Bert's costar in Arizona. In 1888 her husband filed for divorce on the ground of desertion. In 1892, Rankin's wife filed for divorce, but Rankin, a devoted Catholic, did not marry Bert. Rankin already had two daughters (Gladys and Phyllis) from his marriage to Kitty Blanchard.

On 28 July 1893, Bert married Forrest Robinson, who was an actor from Broadway and later starred in films of Mary Pickford. They met when performing together in The Lost Paradise.

After becoming a widow in 1924, she lived with her daughter in Denver in the 1930s.

== Works ==
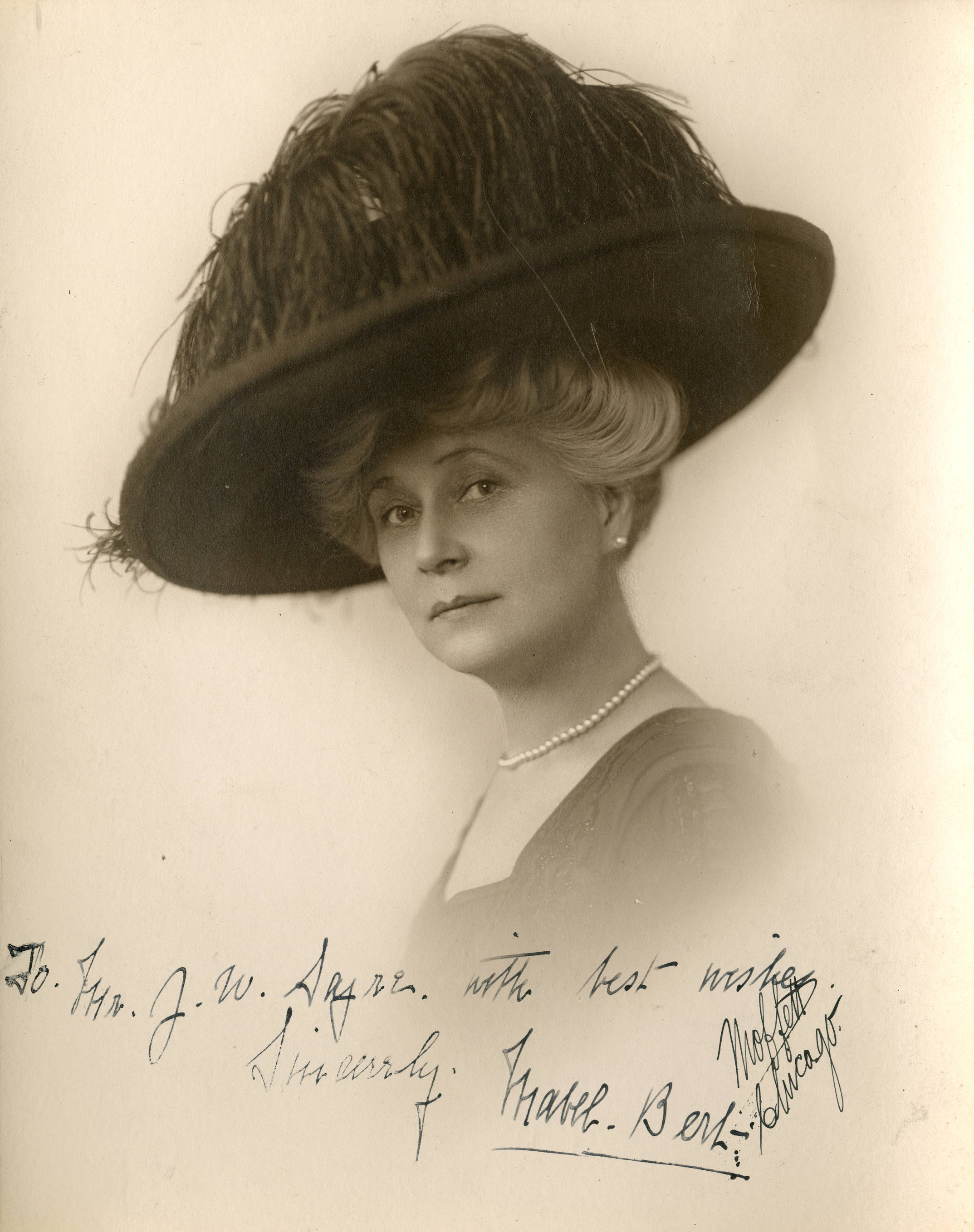
Mabel Bert, 1915, Daddy-Long-Legs

- Stage Play 1925: Accused as Mme. De Verron
- Movie 1921: The Wonderful Thing as Lady Sophia Alexandria Mannerby
- Movie 1921: Straight Is the Way as Aunt Mehitabel
- Movie 1920: Blackbirds
- Stage Play 1918: Turn to the Right
- Stage Play 1915: Daddy-Long-Legs
- Stage Play 1914: Young Wisdom as Mrs. Claffenden: "The girls' mother played splendidly by Mabel Bert."
- Stage Play 1912: The Senator Keeps House as Mrs Ida Flower: "Miss Mabel Bert played the part of Mrs. Ida Flower with great skill, delicacy and charm."
- Stege Play 1911: Sire as Mlle de Saint-Salbi: "One of the most sympathetic and charming character portrayals that has been seen on the Pittsburgh stage in a long time."
- Stage Play 1911: What the Doctor Ordered
- Stage Play 1910: The Faith Healer
- Stage Play 1909: Ragged Robin
- Stage Play 1906: The Crossing as Mrs. Temple: "The finished acting of Miss Mabel Bert saved it from exceeding tameness"
- Stage Play 1906: The Light Eternal
- Stage Play 1906: The Price of Money
- Broadway 1899-1900-1901-1903-1905: Ben Hur as Mother of Hur
- Stage Play 1899: Arizona as Estrella Bonham
- Stage Play 1898: The Master as Mrs. Thomas Faber: "Mabel Bert as the wife of the stern "Master" cannot well be too much praised for her earnest and natural performances."
- Stage Play 1896: The Liar as Elaine Rousseau
- Stage Play 1894: The Lost Paradise: "Among the actors and actresses who made up the stock company and the Bijou last summer, none were more genuinely appreciated than young Forrest Robinson and Mabel Bert."
- Stage Play 1892: Little Tippett
- Stage Play 1891: The Canuck as Angelique Bisquitte
- Stage Play 1890: The Fatal Card
- Stage Play 1890: Shenandoah
- Stage Play 1890: The Masqueraders
- Stage Play 1889: Hearts-Ease as Lady Neville
- Stage Play 1889: Undine
- Stage Play 1889: Hazel Kirk
- Stage Play 1889: Convict 1240
- Stage Play 1889: The Silver King
- Stage Play 1889: The Kantuck
- Stage Play 1888-1889: The Runaway Wife
- Stage Play 1888: The New Danites as Miss Dido
- Stage Play 1887: Allan Dare
- Stage Play 1887: Wife and Child as Lady Alice
- Stage Play 1886: 49 as Carrots
- Stage Play 1886: The Last Days of Pompeii
- Stage Play 1886: Under the Polar Star
- Stage Play 1886: Falsely Accused, or, The Deadwood Stage as Pix
- Stage Play 1886: The Two Orphans as Louise
- Stage Play 1886: The Golden Giant as Ethel Wayne and later as Bessie Fairfax
- Stage Play 1886: Everybody's Friend as Mrs Featherly
- Stage Play 1886: The Field of the Cloth of Gold
- Stage Play 1886: Rob Roy
- Stage Play 1886: Guy Mannering as Julia Mannering
- Stage Play 1886: Erin O'Chorra as Norah Delaney
- Stage Play 1886: Money as Clara Douglas
- Stage Play 1886: Second Sight
- Stage Play 1886: Hoodman Blind
- Stage Play 1886: Notre Dame as Esmeralda
- Stage Play 1886: The Danites as Widder and later as Billy Piper: "A young lady of great talent as an actress, and of extreme beauty"
- Stage Play 1885: A Wall Street Bandit
- Stage Play 1885: Macbeth as Lady Macduff and later as Lady Macbeth
- Stage Play 1885: Brought to Justice as Nell Forrest
- Stage Play 1882: Step by Step as Shop Girl
- Stage Play 1882: A Prisoner for Life (debut)
