= A Child for Sale =

1920 silent film directed by Ivan Abramson

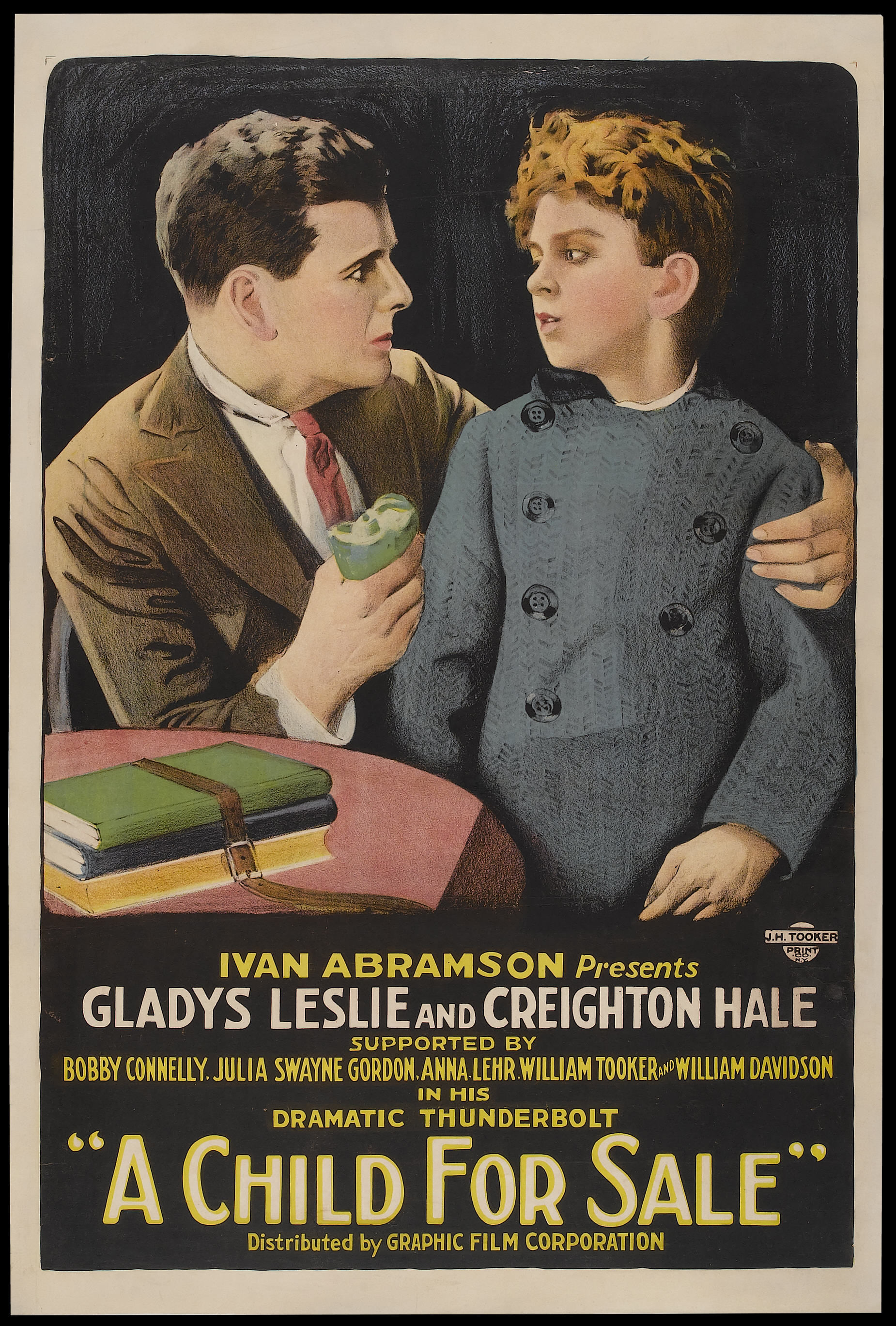
- Film poster
- Directed by: Ivan Abramson
- Written by: Ivan Abramson
- Produced by: Ivan Abramson
- Starring: Gladys Leslie; Creighton Hale
- Cinematography: Louis Dunmyre
- Production company: Graphic Films Corp.
- Distributed by: Graphic Films Corp.
- Release date: April 1920
- Running time: 6 reels (approximately 60 minutes)
- Country: United States
- Language: Silent (English intertitles)

A Child for Sale is a lost 1920 American silent drama film directed by Ivan Abramson, starring Gladys Leslie and Creighton Hale.

== Plot ==
Charles Stoddard (played by Hale) is a poor artist living with his wife and two children in Greenwich Village. Destitute after his wife dies, he is forced to sell one of his children for $1,000 to a childless rich woman. He soon comes to his senses however, and backs out of the deal. From there, the story takes a number of twists and turns involving Ruth Gardner (Leslie) (the wife of Dr. Gardner who treats Stoddard's child for illness) and Ruth's parents—whose father is also Stoddard's landlord and mother is later revealed to be Stoddard's long-lost mother from a prior marriage.

== Cast ==
- Gladys Leslie as Ruth Gardner
- Creighton Hale as Charles Stoddard
- Bobby Connelly as Walter Stoddard (Charles' son)
- Julia Swayne Gordon as Paula Harrison
- William H. Tooker as William Harrison
- Anna Lehr as Catherine Bell (Dr. Gardner's nurse)
- William B. Davidson as Dr. Gardner
- "Baby" Ruth Sullivan as Sylvia Stoddard (Charles' daughter)

== Publicity ==
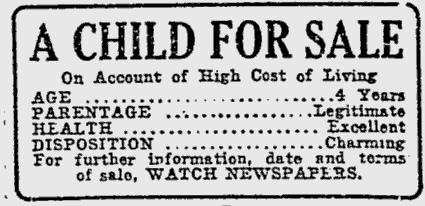
Advertisement in the Reading Eagle, October 29, 1920

The ad campaign for the film included a faux advertisement for selling a child.

== Reception ==
Critic Burns Mantle noted some shortcomings of the film in his review of the "melodramatic opus" in Photoplay, stating that "Ivan Abramson's idea of what constitutes a coherent and convincing dramatic story, taking this picture as a sample, offer many opportunities for the raucous hoot and the mirthful snort. ...His picture is an inartistic jumble of unrelated incidents to me ..." Other contemporary reviews were of a more non-specific and generally positive nature, such as the review by the New York Clipper which described the picture as "intensely interesting from start to finish."
