= A Nymph of the Foothills =

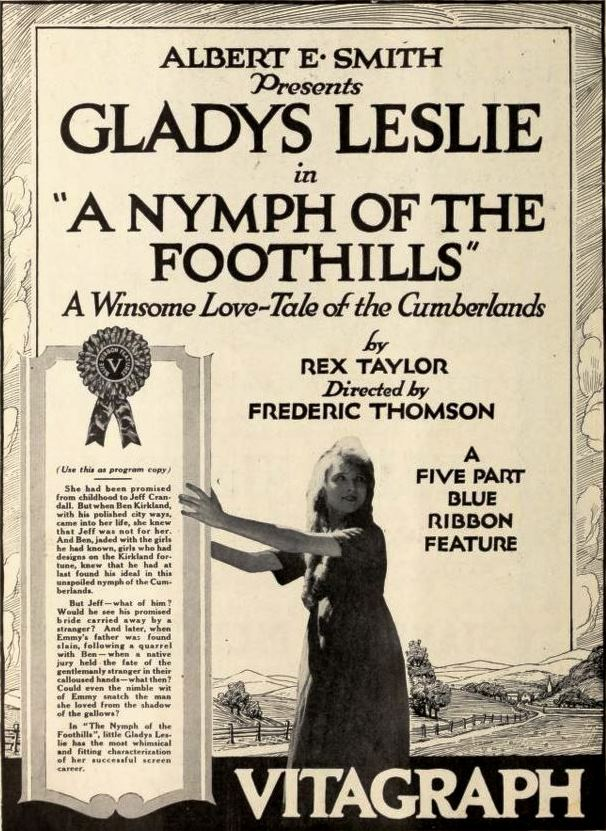
- Directed by: Frederick A. Thomson
- Written by: Rex Taylor; Garfield Thompson
- Produced by: Albert E. Smith
- Starring: Gladys Leslie; Alfred Kappeler; Walter Hiers
- Cinematography: Jules Cronjager
- Production company: Vitagraph Company of America
- Distributed by: Greater Vitagraph
- Release date: September 9, 1918
- Running time: 60 minutes
- Country: United States
- Languages: Silent; English intertitles

A Nymph of the Foothills is a 1918 American silent drama film directed by Frederick A. Thomson and starring Gladys Leslie, Alfred Kappeler and Walter Hiers.

== Cast ==
- Gladys Leslie as Emmy Chaney
- Alfred Kappeler as Ben Kirkland
- Walter Hiers as Tubby
- Charles A. Stevenson as Henry Kirkland
- Arnold Lucy as Old Man

== Bibliography ==
- Darby, William. Masters of Lens and Light: A Checklist of Major Cinematographers and Their Feature Films. Scarecrow Press, 1991.
