= Square Joe =

1922 film

Square Joe is a boxing-themed American drama film released in 1922. The silent film was directed by J. Harrison Edwards and starred boxer Joe Jeanette with fellow boxer John Lester Johnson co-starring. It was produced by Colored Feature Photoplay Co. and opened in Harlem at the Roosevelt.

The film is about an innocent man convicted of killing a policeman during a raid on a gambling operation and features a boxing match. The New York Age reported the film "thrills and holds the interest of spectators from beginning to end."

John Lester Johnson was in several more films afterwards. Jeanette later fought Jack Johnson, who also appeared in films. Their fight appears in the 1970 documentary film Jack Johnson. The film was also Fredi Washington's debut on the big screen.

== Cast ==
- Joe Jeanette
- John Lester Johnson
- Marion Moore
- Charles Fouchee
- Bob Slater
- Mrs. Fred Moore
- Fred Miller
- Bobby Fitzgerald
- Mrs. Eugene L. Moore
- Fredrica Washington
- Minnie Summer

== See also ==
- List of boxing films
