= The Goose Girl (1915 film) =

1915 film by Frederick A. Thomson

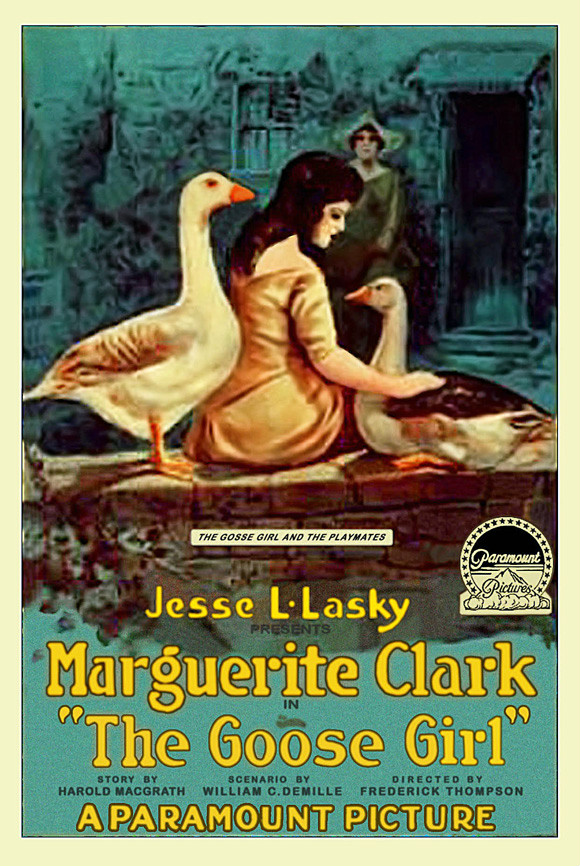
- Theatrical release one-sheet poster
- Directed by: Frederick A. Thomson
- Written by: William C. deMille (scenario)
- Based on: The Goose Girl by Harold McGrath
- Produced by: Jesse Lasky
- Starring: Marguerite Clark; Monroe Salisbury
- Cinematography: Percy Hilburn (French)
- Production company: Jesse L. Lasky Feature Play Company
- Distributed by: Paramount Pictures
- Release date: January 25, 1915
- Running time: 50 minutes
- Country: United States
- Languages: Silent; English intertitles

The Goose Girl is a 1915 American silent drama film directed by Frederick A. Thomson and distributed by Paramount Pictures. The film is based on the 1909 novel of the same name by Harold McGrath loosely based on the fairy tale of the same name, and it starred Marguerite Clark and Monroe Salisbury.

== Plot ==
Count Von Herbeck, an ambitious chancellor to the Grand Duke of Ehrenstein, secretly marries and has a daughter. At the urging of his dying wife, the count kidnaps the duke's infant daughter and substitutes his own in the castle so that she may live in the style of a great lady.

The real princess, abandoned by the gypsies who abducted her for the count, is raised by peasants and given the name "Goose Girl." The young King Frederick is betrothed to the impostor princess of Ehrenstein, whom he has never seen, but before the wedding takes place, he runs away and roams the countryside, where he encounters and falls in love with the Goose Girl.

After a series of adventures, during which Frederick decides to wed the false princess for the good of the country, the Goose Girl's true identity is revealed, and Frederick is delighted to learn that he is now betrothed to the girl of his heart.

== Cast ==
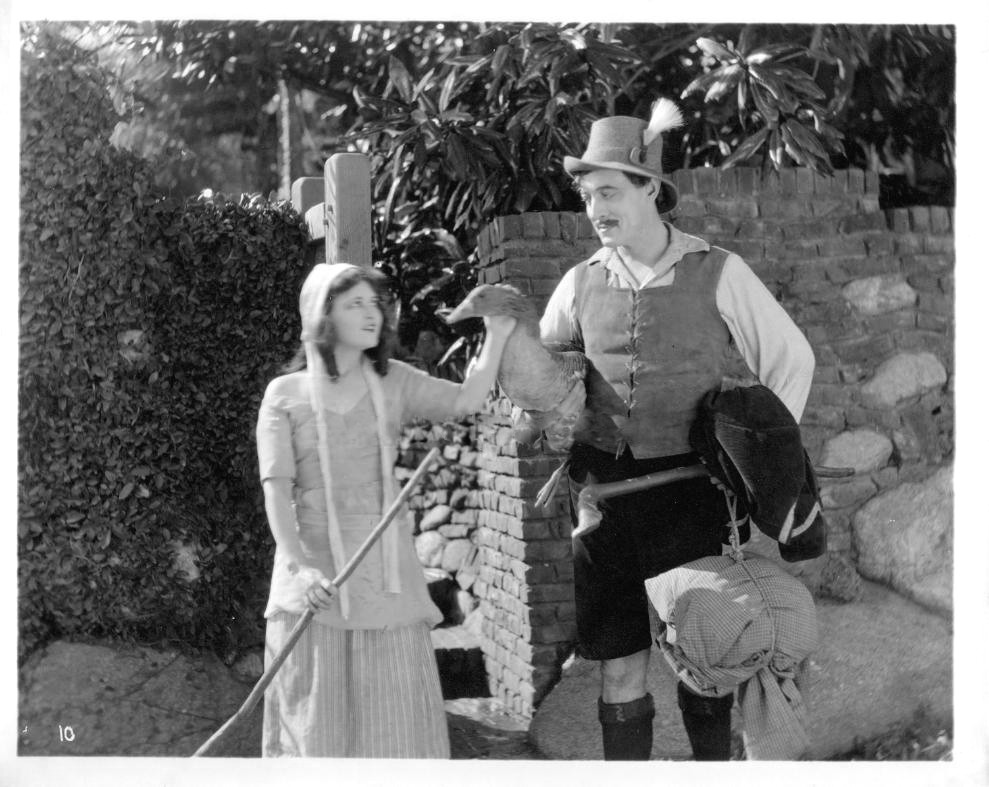
Marguerite Clark and Monroe Salisbury in The Goose Girl

- Marguerite Clark as Gretchen
- Monroe Salisbury as King Frederick
- Sydney Deane as Prince Regent of Jugendheit
- E. N. Dunbar as Grand Duke of Ehrenstein
- James Neill as Count Von Herbeck
- Lawrence Peyton as Von Wallenstein
- Page Peters as Carmichael (credited as P.E. Peters)
- H. B. Carpenter as Torpete The Gypsy
- Ernest Joy as Hans
- J. M. Casidy as Gottfried
- Miss Johnson as Princess Hildegarde
- Jane Darwell as Irma

== Preservation ==
As none of copies were able to locate, the film is presumed lost.

== See also ==
- List of lost films
