= Little Miss No-Account =

1918 film by William P. S. Earle

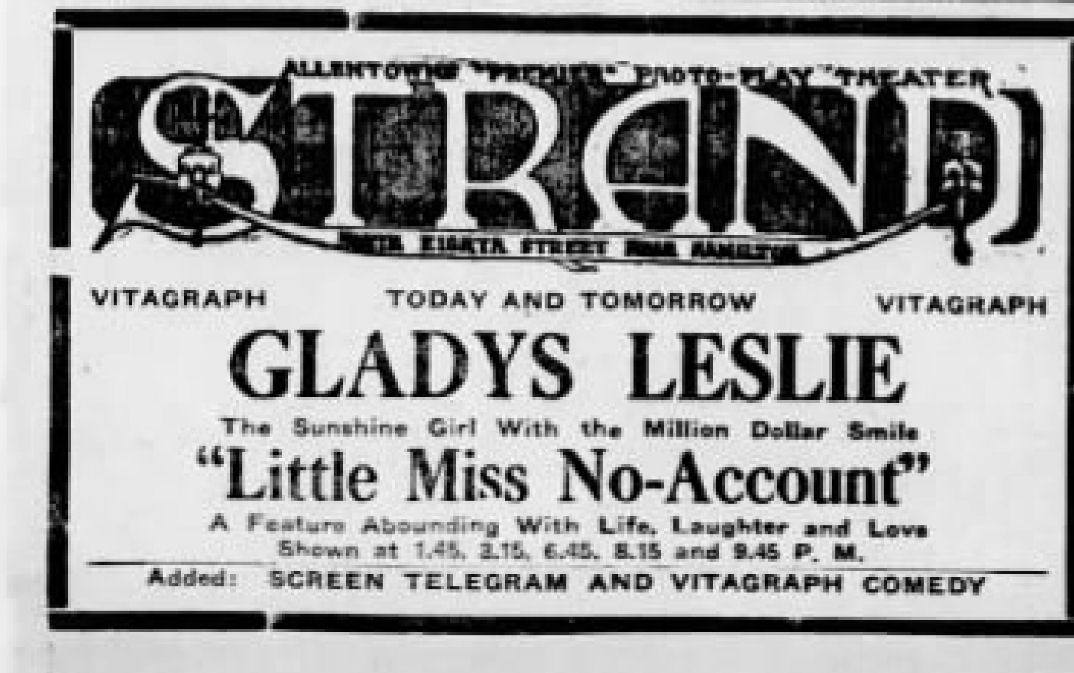
- Theater newspaper advertisement
- Directed by: William P. S. Earle
- Written by: A. Van Buren Powell (scenario)
- Based on: The Reflection of Scarlet by Edward P. Smaney
- Starring: Gladys Leslie; Frank O'Connor; William Calhoun; Eulalie Jensen; Wes Jenkins
- Cinematography: John W. Brown
- Production company: Vitagraph Company of America
- Distributed by: Vitagraph Company of America
- Release date: April 13, 1918
- Running time: 5 reels
- Country: United States
- Language: Silent (English intertitles)

Little Miss No-Account is a 1918 American silent comedy drama film directed by William P. S. Earle and starring Gladys Leslie, Frank O'Connor, William Calhoun, Eulalie Jensen, and Wes Jenkins. It is based on the story The Reflection of Scarlet by Edward P. Smaney. The film was released by Vitagraph Company of America on April 13, 1918.

== Cast ==
- Gladys Leslie as Patty Baring
- Frank O'Connor as Edwin Sayer
- William Calhoun as Josiah Wheeler
- Eulalie Jensen as Ann Wheeler-Ballinger
- Wes Jenkins as Stebbins (as West Jenkins)
- Richard Wangermann as Herman (as Richard Wangeman)
- Carlton S. King as Ned (as Carlton King)
- Stephen Carr as Bobby

== Preservation ==
With no prints of Little Miss No-Account located in any film archives, it is a lost film.
