= Babs (1920 film) =

1920 film by Edward H. Griffith

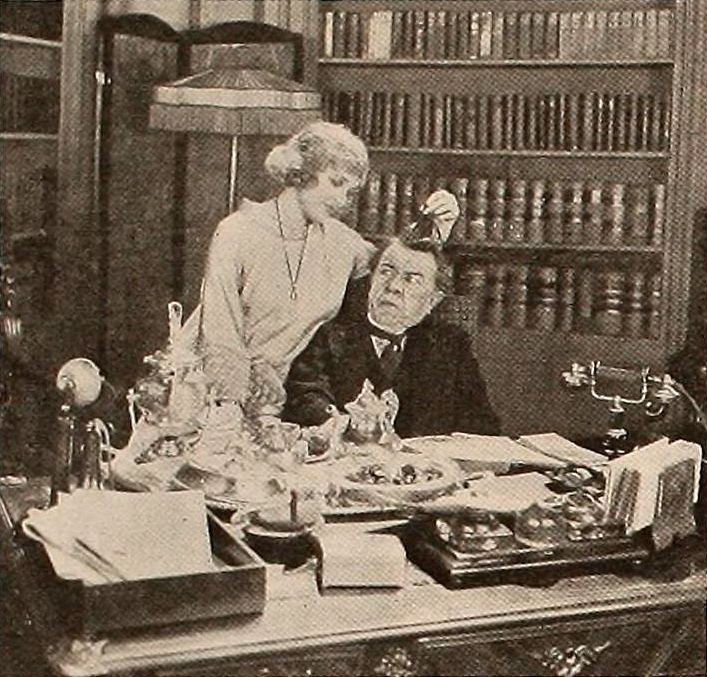
- Still with Corinne Griffith and George Fawcett
- Directed by: Edward H. Griffith
- Written by: Forrest Crissey (story); Lucien Hubbard (scenario)
- Produced by: Vitagraph Company of America; Corinne Griffith
- Starring: Corinne Griffith
- Cinematography: William McCoy
- Distributed by: Vitagraph Company of America
- Release date: July 5, 1920
- Running time: 5 reels
- Country: United States
- Language: Silent (English intertitles)

Babs is a lost 1920 American silent comedy film directed by Edward H. Griffith and starring Corinne Griffith. Griffith and the Vitagraph Company produced with Vitagraph distributing. The film was also called Bab's Candidate and had the working title Gumshoes 4-B.

== Cast ==
- Corinne Griffith as Barbara Marvin
- George Fawcett as Senator Merrill Treadwill Marvin
- Webster Campbell as David Darrow
- Charles S. Abbe as Henry Dawes (credited as Charles Abbe)
- William Holden as Ben Cogswell
- Roy Applegate as Jabez Prouty
- Blanche Davenport as Aunt Celia
- Harvey A. Fisher as Shackleton Hobbs
- Walter Horton as Eben Sprague
- Wes Jenkins as Old Eph
- Frances Miller as Mamie (credited as Frances Miller Grant)
