= Haldane of the Secret Service =

1923 film

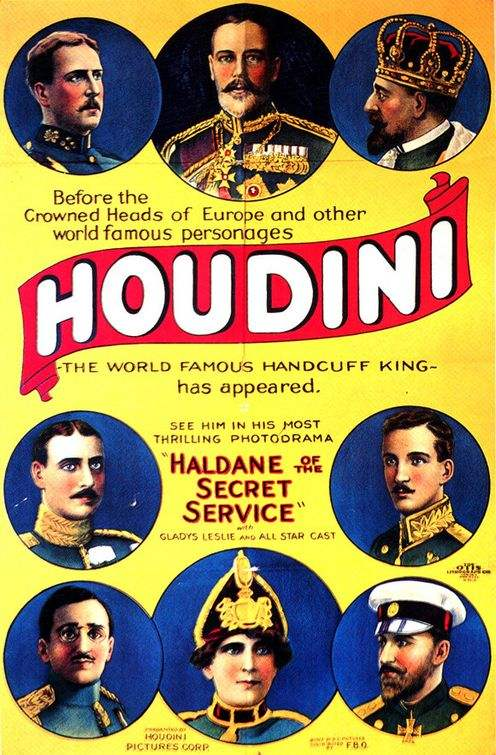
- Theatrical release poster
- Directed by: Harry Houdini
- Starring: Harry Houdini; Gladys Leslie; William J. Humphrey; Richard Carlyle; Edward Boulden; Jane Jennings; Charles Fang
- Cinematography: Irving B. Rubenstein; Frank Zucker
- Production company: Houdini Picture Corporation
- Distributed by: Film Booking Offices of America
- Release date: September 30, 1923
- Running time: 84 minutes
- Country: United States
- Language: Silent (English intertitles)

Haldane of the Secret Service

Haldane of the Secret Service is a 1923 American silent adventure film directed by Harry Houdini. The film stars Harry Houdini, Gladys Leslie, William J. Humphrey, Richard Carlyle, Edward Boulden, Jane Jennings, and Charles Fang. The film was released on September 30, 1923, by Film Booking Offices of America.

== Plot ==
"Heath Haldane (Houdini), son of a detective slain by a gang of counterfeiters, swears vengeance. He rescues a girl (Leslie) from the gang, but is thrown into river by them for dead, and escapes.

"He rounds them up after many adventures, brings about their arrest, and discovers the leader of the gang is father of girl whom he loves." -- Motion Picture News Booking Guide (April 1924)

== Cast ==
- Harry Houdini as Heath Haldane
- Gladys Leslie as Adele Ormsby
- William J. Humphrey as Edward Ormsby
- Richard Carlyle as Joe Ivors
- Edward Boulden as Raoul Usher
- Jane Jennings as Mrs. Clive Usher
- Charles Fang as Ah Ling
- Myrtle Morse as Andrea Drayton
- Irving Brooks as Bruce Drayton
