= The Reprieve: An Episode in the Life of Abraham Lincoln =

1908 film about Abraham Lincoln

- Directed by: Van Dyke Brooke
- Production company: Vitagraph Company of America
- Release date: 1908
- Country: United States
- Language: Silent

The Reprieve: An Episode in the Life of Abraham Lincoln was a 1908 film that included an unknown actor portraying US President Abraham Lincoln pardoning William Scott (The Sleeping Sentinel).

== See also ==
- Abraham Lincoln cultural depictions
