= It Happened to Adele =

1917 silent film

- Directed by: Van Dyke Brooke
- Written by: Agnes Christine Johnston
- Produced by: Edwin Thanhouser
- Starring: Gladys Leslie; Carey L. Hastings; Peggy Burke
- Production company: Thanhouser Film Corporation
- Distributed by: Pathé Exchange
- Release date: July 15, 1917
- Running time: 50 minutes
- Country: United States
- Languages: Silent; English intertitles

It Happened to Adele is a 1917 American silent drama film directed by Van Dyke Brooke and starring Gladys Leslie, Carey L. Hastings and Peggy Burke. Prints and/or fragments were found in the Dawson Film Find in 1978.

== Cast ==
- Gladys Leslie as Adele
- Carey L. Hastings as Adele's Mother
- Peggy Burke as Blanche
- Charles Emerson as Vincent Harvey
- Clarine Seymour as Mary
- Wayne Arey as John W. Horton
- Justus D. Barnes as Vincent's Uncle

== Bibliography ==
- Donald W. McCaffrey & Christopher P. Jacobs. Guide to the Silent Years of American Cinema. Greenwood Publishing, 1999.
