= Sisters (1922 film) =

1922 film

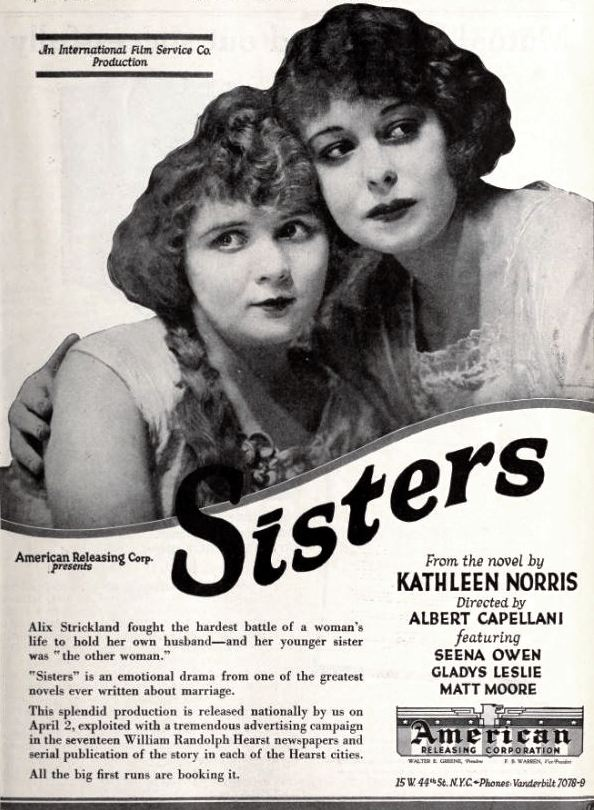
- Directed by: Albert Capellani
- Written by: E. Lloyd Sheldon
- Based on: Sisters; 1919 novel by Kathleen Norris
- Starring: Seena Owen; Gladys Leslie; Matt Moore
- Cinematography: Chester A. Lyons
- Production company: International Film Service
- Distributed by: American Releasing Corporation
- Release date: April 2, 1922
- Running time: 70 minutes
- Country: United States
- Languages: Silent; English intertitles

Sisters is a 1922 American silent drama film directed by Albert Capellani and starring Seena Owen, Gladys Leslie and Matt Moore.

== Cast ==
- Seena Owen as Alix Strickland
- Gladys Leslie as Cherry Strickland
- Mildred Arden as Anna Little
- Matt Moore as Peter Joyce
- Joe King as Martin Lloyd
- Tom Guise as Dr. Strickland
- Robert Schable as Justin Little
- Frances Miller as Cook
- Fred Miller as Butler

== Survival Status ==
A copy is preserved in the Marion Davies Collection at the Library of Congress. The film was restored for Blu-ray and DVD by Edward Lorusso in 2026.

== Bibliography ==
- Connelly, Robert B. The Silents: Silent Feature Films, 1910-36, Volume 40, Issue 2. December Press, 1998.
- Munden, Kenneth White. The American Film Institute Catalog of Motion Pictures Produced in the United States, Part 1. University of California Press, 1997.
