= Wes Jenkins =

American actor

- Born: John Wesley Jenkins; January 1859; Winchester, Virginia, USA
- Died: April 9, 1930 (aged 71); New York, New York, USA
- Occupation: Actor
- Spouse: Mattie Farrar

Wes Jenkins (1859-1930) was an American actor active during Hollywood's silent era. He appears in an untitled Biograph film from 1913 that has been dubbed Lime Kiln Field Day; held by MoMA, the seven-reel clip is thought to be the oldest surviving footage of black actors.

== Biography ==
Wes was born in Winchester, Virginia. He grew up primarily in Pittsburgh, and when he was 14, he dropped out of school to get a job to help his mother and siblings. In his teens, he discovered his talent for singing while performing in groups like the Oriole Quartet. (His brother Robert was also a talented singer.)

He got his start as a theater actor before making the transition to film around 1911. In his early days, he was part of a troupe called the Red Moon Company. He met his wife, Mattie Farrar, while performing in Whalen & Martell's production of The South Before the War; they married in 1898 in Bloomington, Illinois. Between 1911 and his death, he appeared in films for companies like Vitagraph, Cosmopolitan, Distinctive, Kenmar, Famous Players Lasky, Ralph Ince, David O. Selznick, William Fox, Biograph, and more. He died in 1930 in Brooklyn after an illness. He was survived by his wife, his adopted daughter, and his nephew.

== Selected filmography ==
- Scarlet Saint (1925)
- The Silent Command (1923)
- The Custard Nine (1921)
- The Kentuckians (1921)
- The Good-Bad Wife (1920)
- Babs (1920)
- His Father's Wife (1919)
- Little Miss No-Account (1918)
- The Beautiful Mrs. Reynolds (1918)
- A Natural Born Gambler (1916)
- Lime Kiln Club Field Day (1913)
