= Frederick A. Thomson =

American film director (1869–1925)

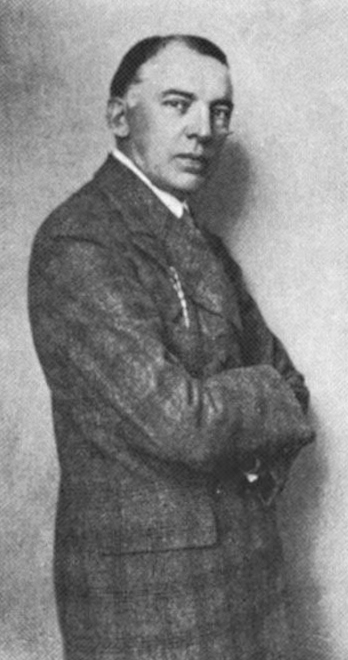
- Born: Frederick Andrew Thomson; August 7, 1869; Montreal, Quebec, Canada
- Died: January 22, 1925 (aged 55); West Hollywood, California, US
- Occupation: Film director

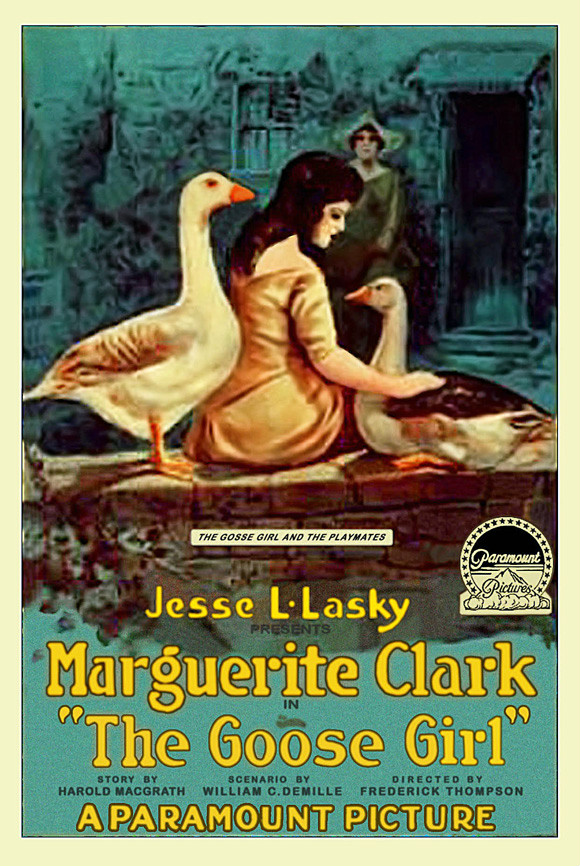
The Goose Girl poster

Frederick Andrew Thomson (1869–1925), sometimes spelled Thompson, was a Canadian-born director of silent films in the United States.

== Biography ==
Frederick Andrew Thomson was born in Montreal on August 7, 1869. He began his directing career in theater.

Thomson was credited by Helen Hayes for enabling her debut in Jean and the Calico Doll. She wrote in her 1968 memoir On Reflection that Thompson persuaded her mother to let her perform in the film for Vitagraph Studios, where he had begun working. The Brooklyn-based troupe traveled by ferry to Fort Lee, New Jersey, to film Jean and the Calico Doll with Maurice Costello and Florence Turner.

He died from heart disease at his home in West Hollywood on January 22, 1925.

== Selected filmography ==
- Freckles (1912)
- Doctor Bridget (1912)
- The Cross-Roads (1912)
- All for a Girl (1912)
- The Locket; or When She Was Twenty (1913)
- The Lion's Bride (1913)
- The Sign of the Cross (1914)
- The Christian (1914)
- The Redemption of David Corson (1914)
- The Spitfire, co-directed with Edwin S. Porter (1914)
- The Goose Girl (1915)
- The Country Boy (1915)
- The Wonderful Adventure (1915)
- Nearly a King (1916)
- An Enemy to the King (1916)
- The Feud Girl (1916)
- A Parisian Romance (1916)
- The Chattel (1916)
- The Saleslady (1916)
- The Danger Trail (1917)
- The Man of Mystery (1917)
- How Could You, Caroline? (1918)
- Wild Primrose (1918)
- A Nymph of the Foothills (1918)
- The Mating (1918)
- The Marriage Pit (1920)
- The Heart Line (1921)

=== Actor ===
- A Tailor-Made Man (1922), as Mr. Stanlaw

=== Screenwriter ===
- The Power of the Press (1928)
