= Van Dyke Brooke =

American actor, screenwriter and film director (1859-1921)

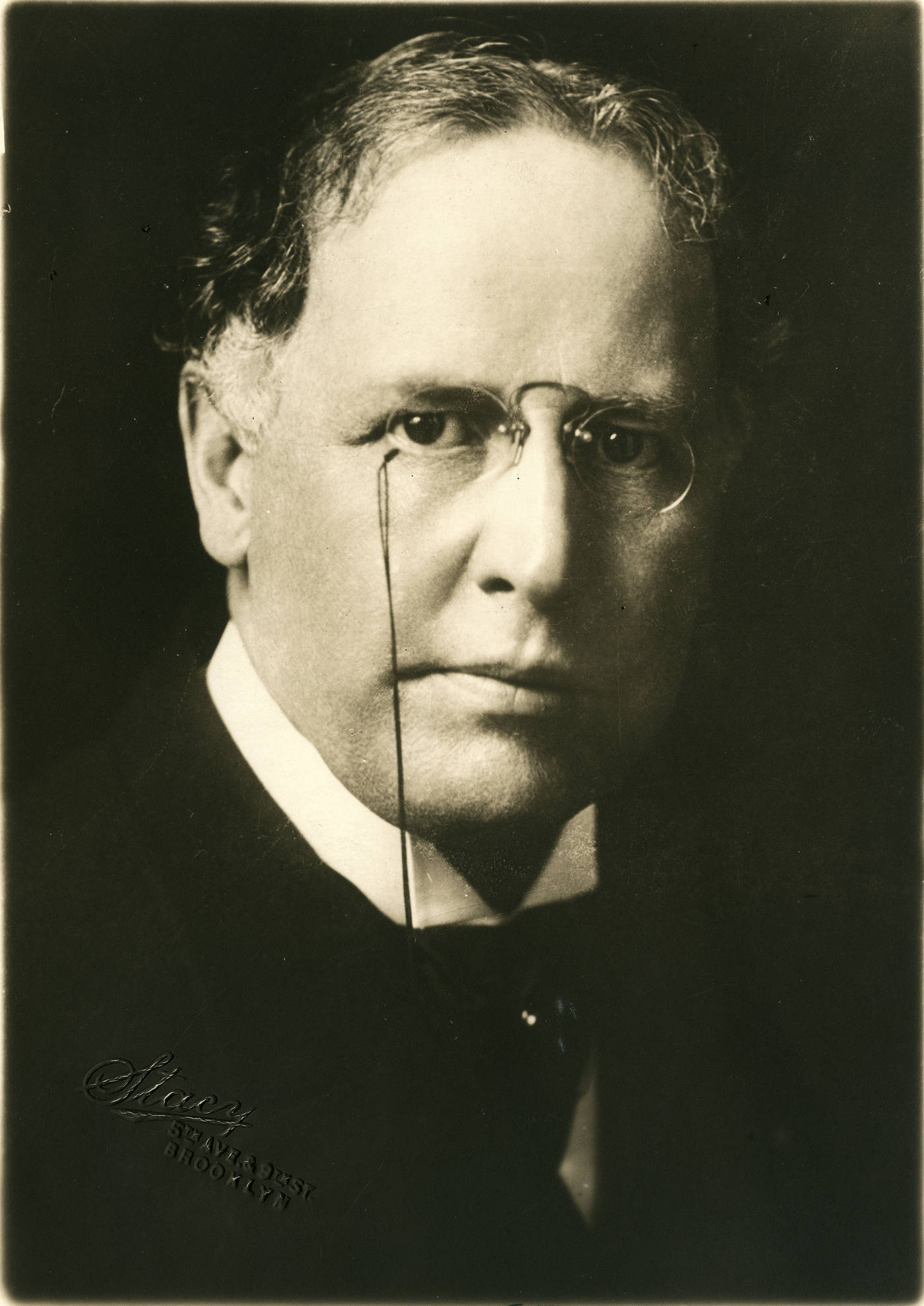
- Born: June 22, 1859; Detroit, Michigan, US
- Died: September 17, 1921 (aged 62); Saratoga Springs, New York, US

Van Dyke Brooke, né Stewart McKerrow (22 June 1859–17 September 1921) was an early American actor, screenwriter and film director, whose works include The Reprieve: An Episode in the Life of Abraham Lincoln (1908) and Lights of New York (1916). He worked as a stage actor for many years before going to work in the film industry in 1909. He became an actor, writer and director for Vitagraph where he found fame and financial reward almost from the outset. He wrote and directed many of the screenplays for the films in which he acted. He worked for the studio until 1916 when he was laid off with other ageing actors. He continued to work as an actor until his death in 1921.

He directed many films starring Norma Talmadge.

== Selected filmography ==
- The Reprieve: An Episode in the Life of Abraham Lincoln (1908) (director)
- We Must Do Our Best (1909)
- The Child Crusoes (1911)
- Some Good in All (1911) as Ben Hartley
- One Can't Always Tell (1913)
- The Doctor's Secret (1913)
- A Helpful Sisterhood (1914)
- Lights of New York (1916)
- An Amateur Orphan (1917) (director)
- It Happened to Adele (1917)
- The Fortune Hunter (1920)
- The Sea Rider (1920)
- What Women Want (1920)
- The Passionate Pilgrim (1921)
- Straight Is the Way (1921)
- A Midnight Bell (1921)
- The Son of Wallingford (1921)
