= Gladys Leslie =

American actress

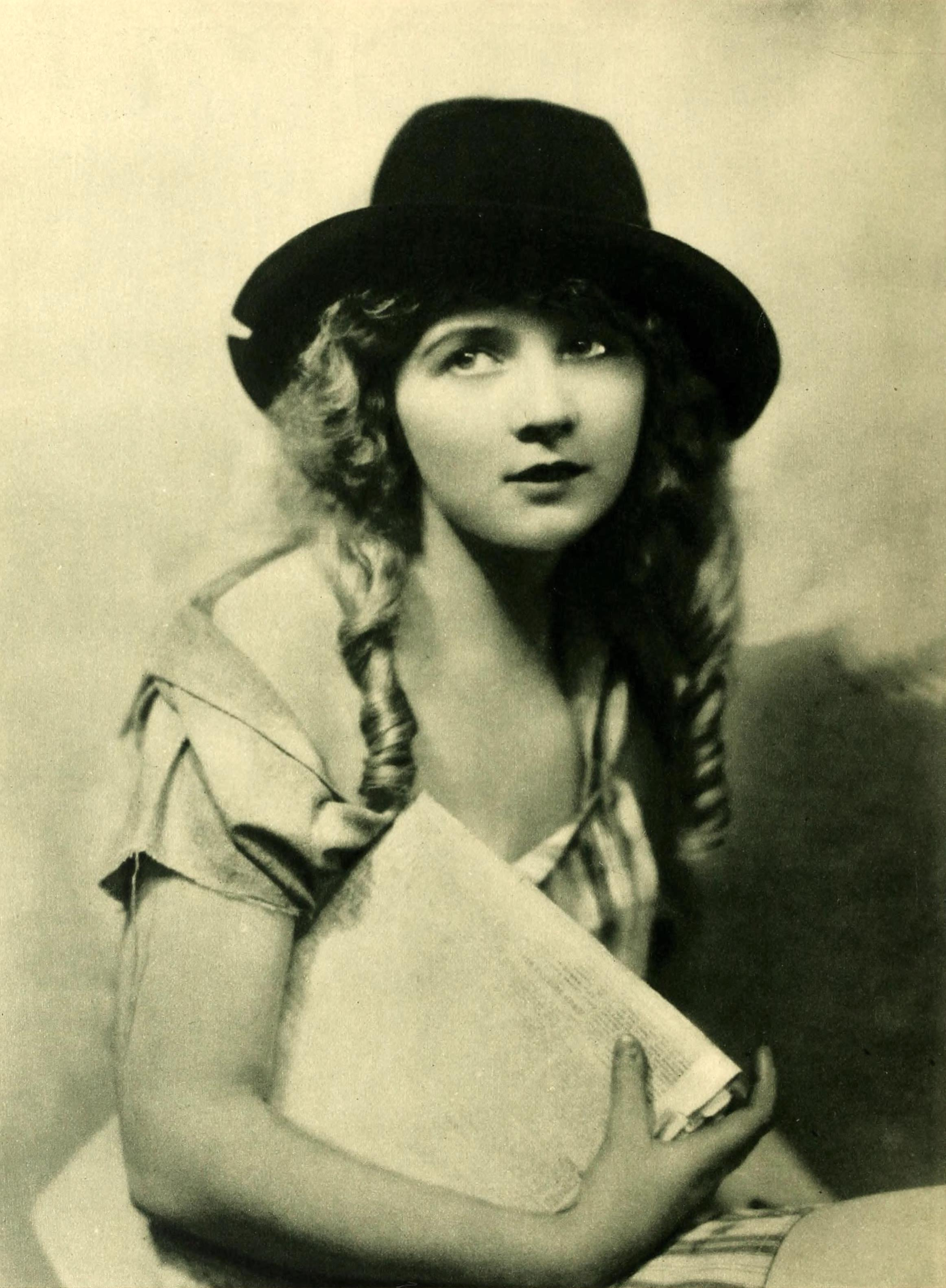
- Leslie in 1921
- Born: Gladys Leslie Moore; March 5, 1899; New York City, U.S.
- Died: October 2, 1976 (aged 77); Boynton Beach, Florida, U.S.
- Occupation: Actress
- Years active: 1915–1925

Gladys Leslie Moore (March 5, 1899 – October 2, 1976) was an American actress in silent film, active in the 1910s and 1920s. She had a number of starring roles from 1917 to the early 1920s and was one of the young female stars of her day.

== Film career ==
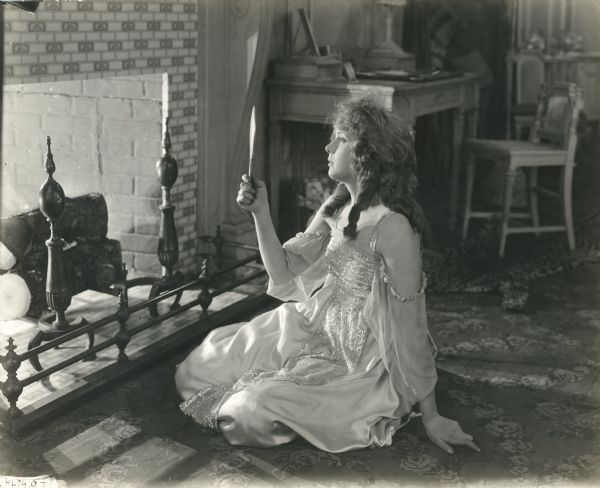
Still of Leslie in the Vitagraph release The Wooing of Princess Pat (1918)

Leslie began her movie career around 1915, acting in short films produced by the Edison Company. By 1917, she was making films with the Thanhouser Company in New Rochelle, New York, including The Vicar of Wakefield (1917). The New York Herald's review of that film dubbed her the "Girl With A Million Dollar Smile," and caused studio head Edwin Thanhouser to decide she was ready for leading roles. Soon she was starring in the lead role in 1917's An Amateur Orphan, but was quickly wooed over to Vitagraph Studios and starred in a number of Vitagraph releases in 1918 and 1919. Leslie and another young female Vitagraph star, Bessie Love, starred in numerous films in young girl-type roles that were popular at the time. Leslie's similar appearance to Mary Pickford was also often noted.

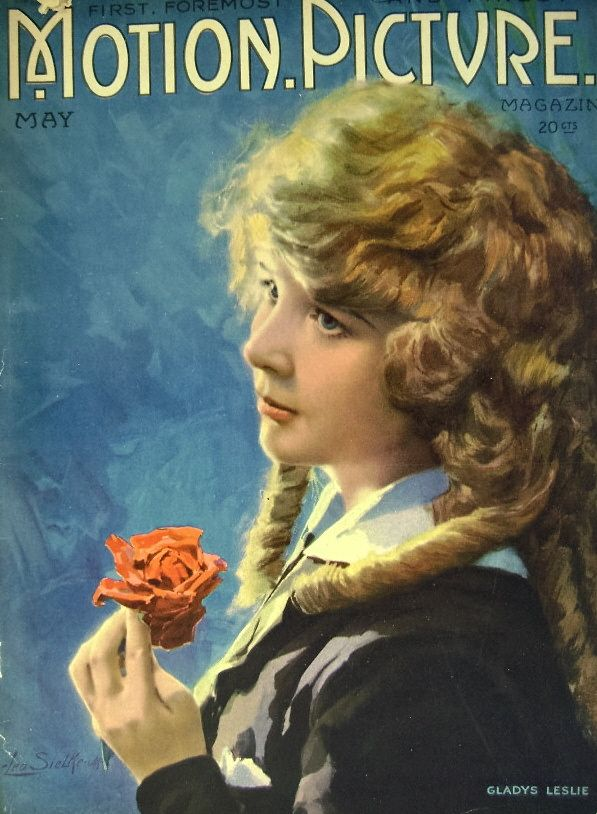
Motion Picture Magazine, 1919

Leslie's association with Vitagraph ended by 1920 and she continued to make films with a number of different studios. Her first non-Vitagraph picture in 1920 was A Child for Sale, directed by Ivan Abramson, where she played a starring role. And in 1923, she had the lead female role in Haldane of the Secret Service featuring Harry Houdini. Nevertheless, her share of starring roles started to decline, and her last appearance was in 1925. She had always claimed, however, that she would stop making films when her bank account "has mounted high enough."

== Personal life ==
Leslie was born in New York City on March 5, 1899, and she died in Boynton Beach, Florida, on October 2, 1976, at age 77.

Along with the new trend of actors doing product endorsements in the early 1920s, Leslie appeared in ads for Tokio Beauty Cream, which was claimed to have given her "magnetic personality." She also wore blouses by Edith Varian Cockcroft in clothing ads.

== Selected filmography ==
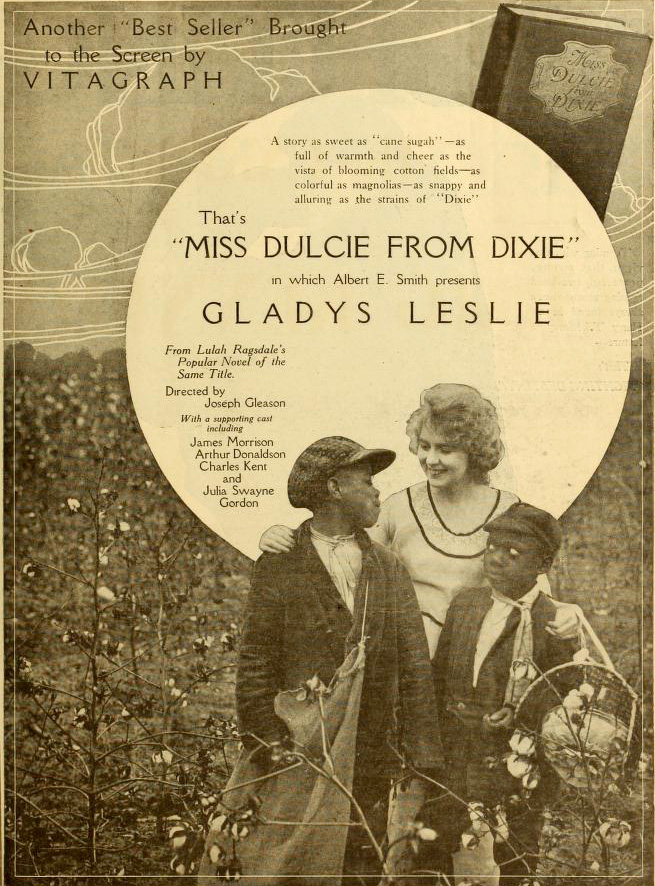
Miss Dulcie from Dixie (1919)

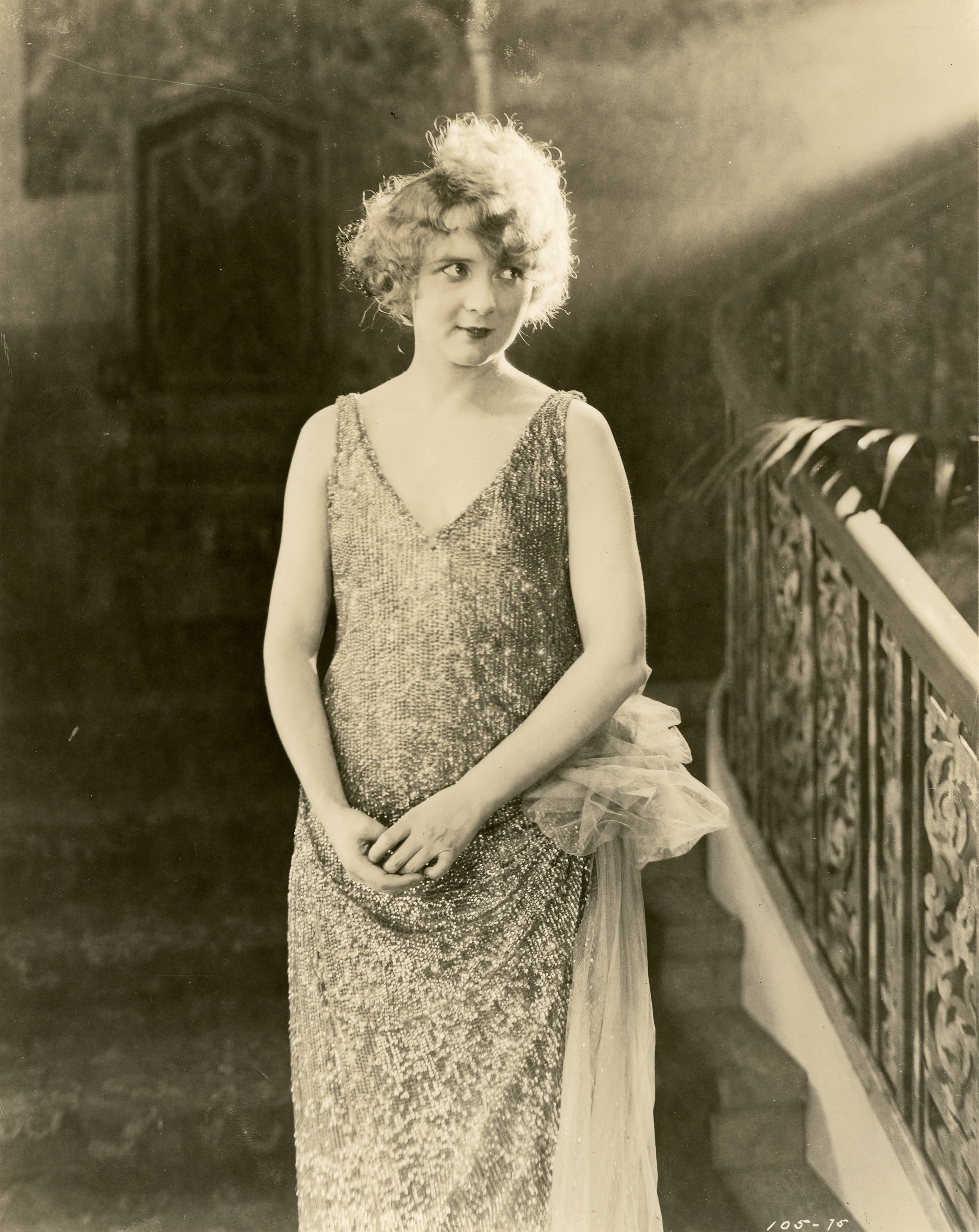
Gladys Leslie, 1921

- Ranson's Folly (1915)
- The Vicar of Wakefield as Sophia Primrose (Thanhouser, 1917) (starring Frederick Warde)
- An Amateur Orphan as Marcia Schuyler (Thanhouser, 1917)
- When Love Was Blind (1917)
- Her Beloved Enemy (1917)
- It Happened to Adele as Adele (Thanhouser, 1917)
- His Own People as Molly Conway (Vitagraph, 1917) (co-starring Harry T. Morey)
- The Wooing of Princess Pat as Princess Pat (Vitagraph, 1918)
- Little Miss No-Account as Patty Baring (Vitagraph, 1918)
- The Little Runaway as Ann Acushla (Vitagraph, 1918)
- The Soap Girl as Marjorie Sanford (Vitagraph, 1918)
- Wild Primrose as Primrose Standish (Vitagraph, 1918)
- A Nymph of the Foothills as Emma Chaney (Vitagraph, 1918)
- The Mating as Nancy Fanne (Vitagraph, 1918)
- The Beloved Impostor as Betty (Vitagraph, 1918)
- Fortune's Child (Vitagraph, 1919)
- Miss Dulcie from Dixie as Dulcie Culpepper (Vitagraph, 1919)
- A Stitch in Time as Phoebe Ann (Vitagraph, 1919, directed by Ralph Ince)
- The Adventure Shop (1919)
- Too Many Crooks as Boston Fanny (Vitagraph, 1919, directed by Ralph Ince)
- The Girl-Woman as Belinda (Vitagraph, 1919)
- The Gray Towers Mystery as June Wheeler (Vitagraph, 1919)
- A Child for Sale (Graphic Films, 1920)
- The Midnight Bride (Vitagraph, 1920)
- Straight is the Way (Cosmopolitan, 1921) (starring Matt Moore)
- Jim the Penman (1921) (starring Lionel Barrymore)
- God's Country and the Law (1921)
- Timothy's Quest (1922)
- The Darling of the Rich (1922)
- Sisters (1922)
- The Snitching Hour (1922)
- If Winter Comes (1923)
- Broadway Broke (1923)
- Man and Wife (1923) (with Maurice Costello)
- Haldane of the Secret Service (1923) (with Harry Houdini)
- Enemies of Youth (1925) (with Mahlon Hamilton)
- Pearl of Love (1925) (with Betty Balfour)
