= Parted Curtains =

1920 film

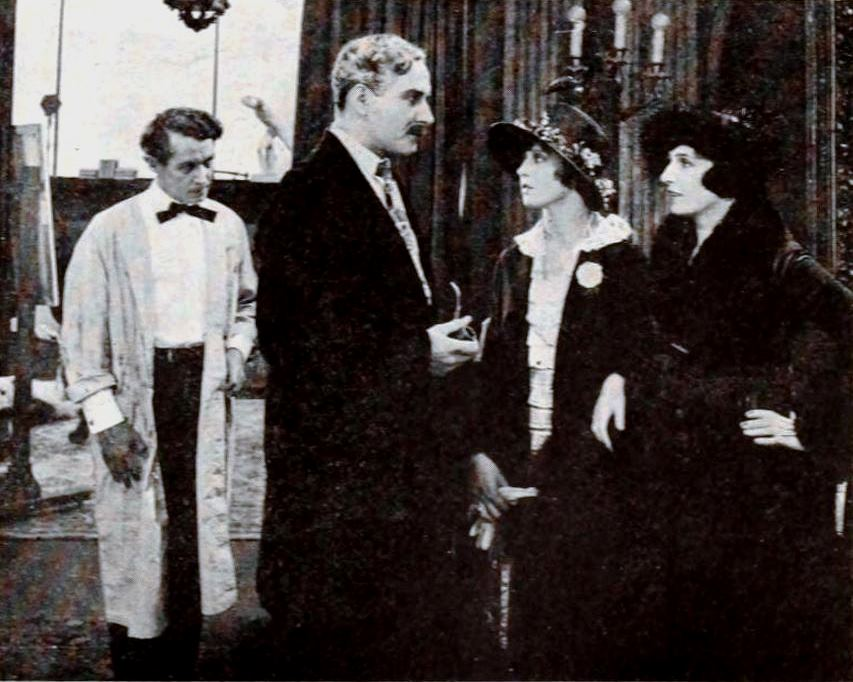
- Still with Henry B. Walthall, William Clifford, Margaret Landis, and Mary Alden
- Directed by: Bertram Bracken; James C. Bradford
- Screenplay by: Bertram Bracken; James C. Bradford
- Story by: Franklin Hall; Tom J. Hopkins
- Based on: Parted Curtains by Franklyn Hall
- Starring: Henry B. Walthall; Mary Alden; William Clifford; Edward Cecil; Margaret Landis; Mickey Moore
- Cinematography: Walter L. Griffin
- Production company: National Film Corporation of America
- Distributed by: State Rights; Warner Bros. Pictures
- Release date: April 2, 1920
- Running time: 60 minutes
- Country: United States
- Language: Silent (English intertitles)

Parted Curtains is a 1920 American silent crime-drama film written and directed by Bertram Bracken and James C. Bradford. The film stars Henry B. Walthall, Mary Alden, William Clifford, Edward Cecil, Margaret Landis, and Mickey Moore. The film was released on April 2, 1920.

== Cast ==
- Henry B. Walthall as Joe Jenkins
- Mary Alden as Mrs. Masters
- William Clifford as The Weasel
- Edward Cecil as Wheeler Masters
- Margaret Landis as Helen
- Mickey Moore as Bobby Masters
- Ann Davis
- Charles Wheelock
- Richard Morris
