= Her Man =

Her Man may refer to:

- "Her Man" (song), a 1990 song written by Kent Robbins
- Her Man (1924 film), a romantic western silent film
- Her Man (1930 film), an American pre-Code drama film
