= Elinor Field =

American actress (1902–1998)

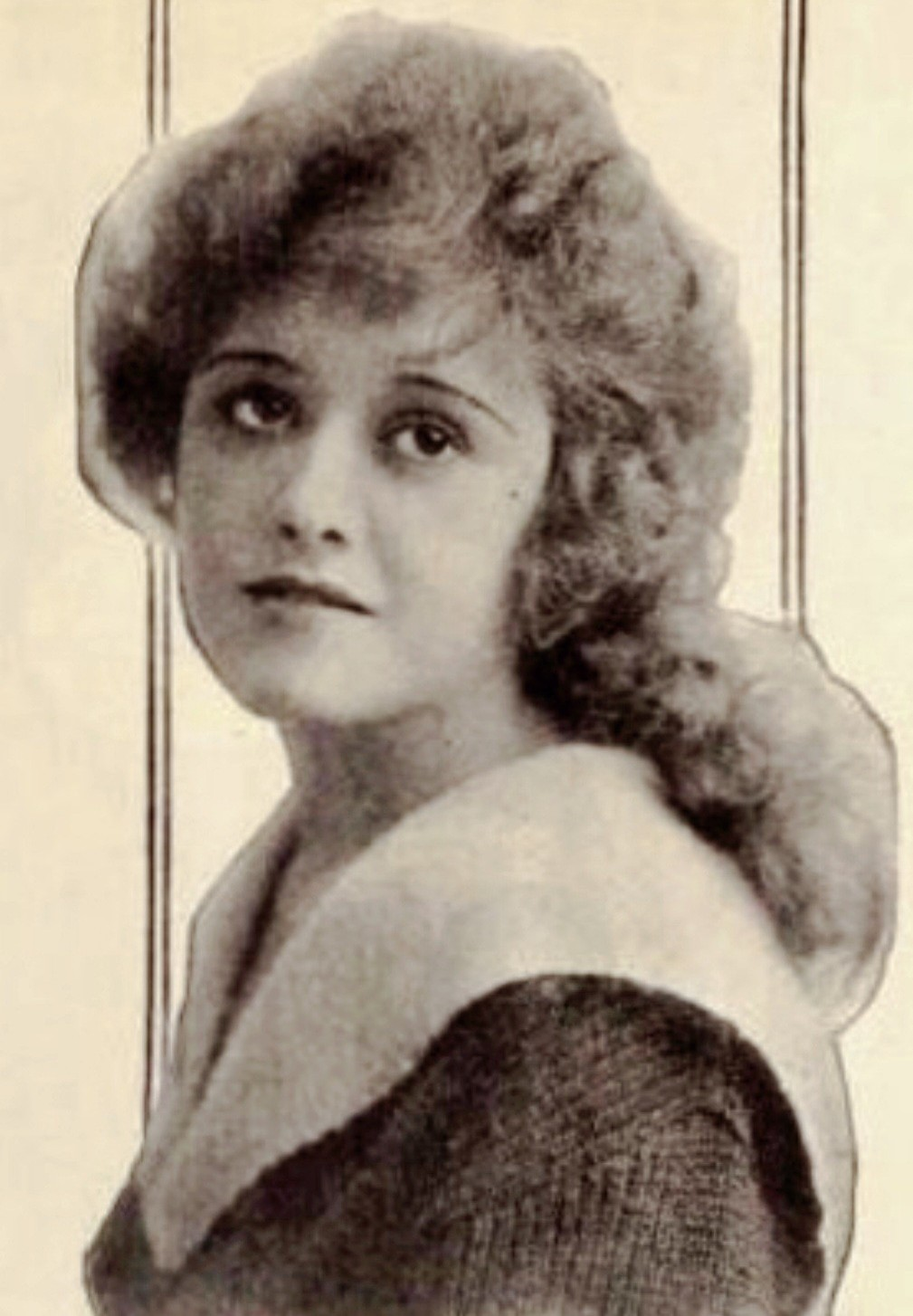
- Field in 1918
- Born: Eleanor Field; January 4, 1902; Plymouth, Pennsylvania, U.S.
- Died: February 24, 1998 (aged 96); Chestertown, Maryland, U.S.
- Occupation: Actress
- Years active: 1917–1934

Elinor Field (born Eleanor Field; January 4, 1902 – February 24, 1998) was an American film actress who was one of Mack Sennett's Sennett Bathing Beauties. She also starred in the 15-episode serial The Jungle Goddess (1922).

== Biography ==
Elinor Field was born on January 4, 1902, in Plymouth, Pennsylvania, USA, as Eleanor Field. She began acting straight out of high school. Although she appeared in more than thirty films, Field never became a major star. She died on February 24, 1998, in Chestertown, Maryland at the age of 96.

== Selected filmography ==
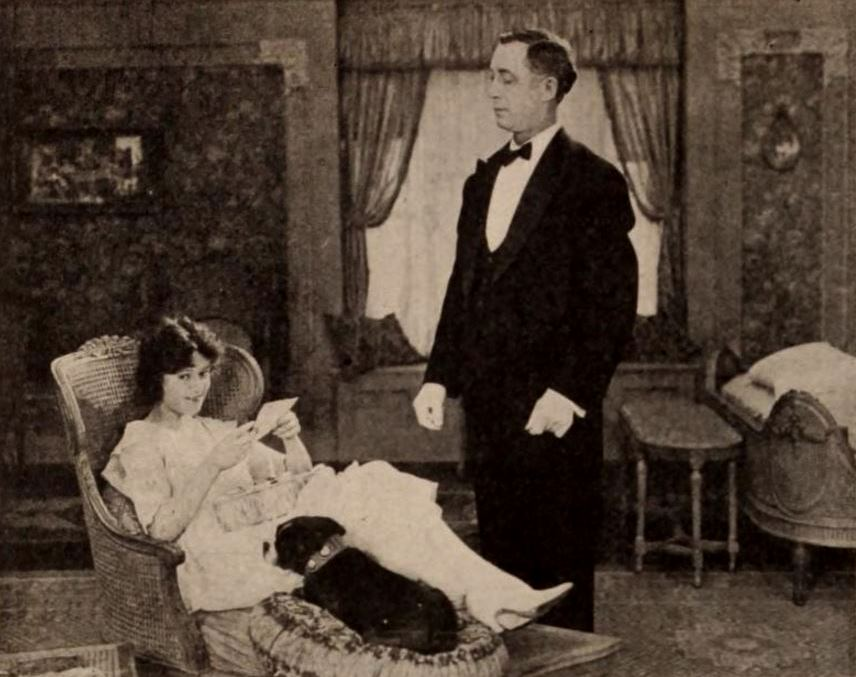
Field (left) in comedy film Hearts and Masks (1921).

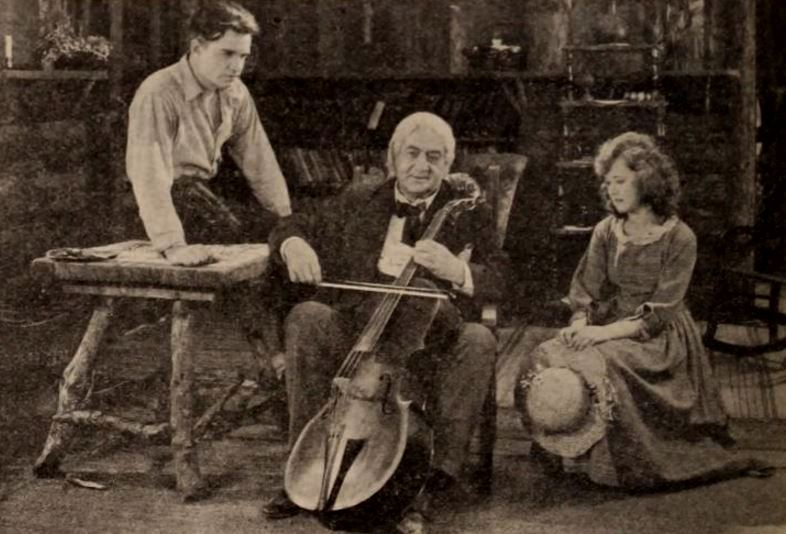
Still from the American drama film The Blue Moon (1920) with Pell Trenton, Herbert Standing, and Elinor Field.

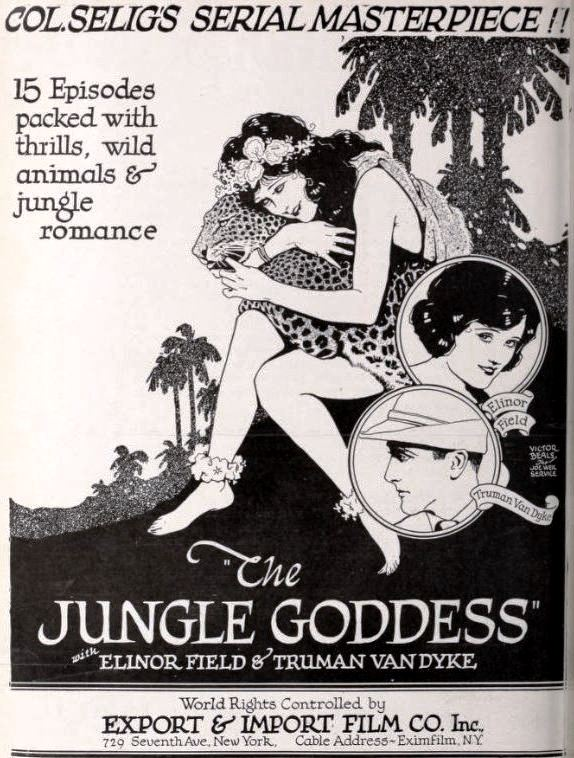
Advertisement for The Jungle Goddess (1922)

- The Pullman Bride (1917) as a Mack Sennett Bathing Beauty (uncredited)
- Are Waitresses Safe? (1917) uncredited
- How to be Happy Though Married (1919)
- The Blue Moon (1920)
- The Kentucky Colonel (1920)
- Once to Every Woman (1920) as Virginia Meredith
- Hearts and Masks (1921)
- Little Eva Ascends (1922)
- The Purple Riders (1922)
- The Leather Pushers (1922)
- The Jungle Goddess (1922), a 15-episode serial
- Don Quickshot of the Rio Grande (1923), starring role
- Blinky (1923) as Priscilla Islip
- Single Handed (1923) as Ruth Randolph
- The Red Warning (1923) as Louise Ainslee
