= Fred Whitman =

Fred Whitman may refer to:

- Fred Whitman (politician) (1896–1974) Canadian politician
- Fred Whitman (actor) (1887–1945) American actor
