= Rose of the Bowery =

1927 film

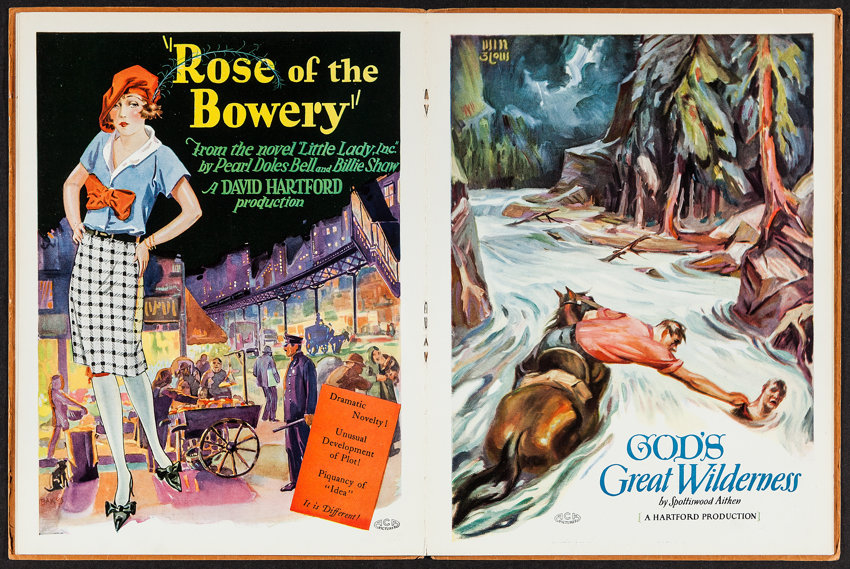
- Poster for the film alongside that of God's Great Wilderness (1927)
- Directed by: Bertram Bracken
- Written by: Walter L. Griffin; Bertram Bracken
- Produced by: David Hartford
- Starring: Edna Murphy; Crauford Kent; Mildred Harris
- Cinematography: Walter L. Griffin
- Production company: David Hartford Productions
- Distributed by: American Cinema Association
- Release date: May 15, 1927
- Running time: 60 minutes
- Country: United States
- Languages: Silent; English intertitles

Rose of the Bowery is a 1927 American silent crime film directed by Bertram Bracken and starring Edna Murphy, Crauford Kent and Mildred Harris.

== Synopsis ==
A baby is accidentally left the house of a criminal and grows up in New York City's Bowery neighborhood. Later wrongly dragged into a murder case she is revealed to be the daughter of the district attorney.

== Cast ==
- Edna Murphy as Rose
- Johnnie Walker
- Crauford Kent
- Mildred Harris

== Preservation ==
This film is now lost.

== Bibliography ==
- Connelly, Robert B. The Silents: Silent Feature Films, 1910-36, Volume 40, Issue 2. December Press, 1998.
- Munden, Kenneth White. The American Film Institute Catalog of Motion Pictures Produced in the United States, Part 1. University of California Press, 1997.
