= The Confession (1920 film) =

American silent drama film

- Directed by: Bertram Bracken
- Written by: Franklyn Hall; William H. Clifford
- Based on: The Confession; 1911 play by Hal Reid
- Starring: Henry B. Walthall
- Cinematography: Walter L. Griffin
- Production company: National Film Corporation of America
- Release date: 1920
- Running time: 77 minutes
- Country: United States
- Languages: Silent film; English intertitles

The Confession

The Confession is a 1920 American silent drama film directed by Bertram Bracken, based on the play of the same name by Hal Reid. The film stars Henry B. Walthall as Father Bartlett, a priest who refuses to reveal the identity of a killer after hearing his confession, even though Bartlett's brother Tom is on trial for the crime.

The film was re-released in 1927 under the title Confession.

== Cast ==
- Henry B. Walthall as Father Bartlett
- Francis McDonald as Tom Bartlett
- William Clifford as Joseph Dumont
- Margaret McWade as Mrs. Bartlett
- Margaret Landis as Rose Creighton
- Barney Furey as Jimmie Creighton

== Reception ==
Upon release, a reviewer for Kansas City, Missouri's The Independent wrote a positive review of the film, praising Walthall's performance and calling the film "the strongest dramatic picture that has come out of motion picture studios."

== Preservation ==
A copy of The Confession is held by Library and Archives Canada.
