= A Million to Burn =

1923 film

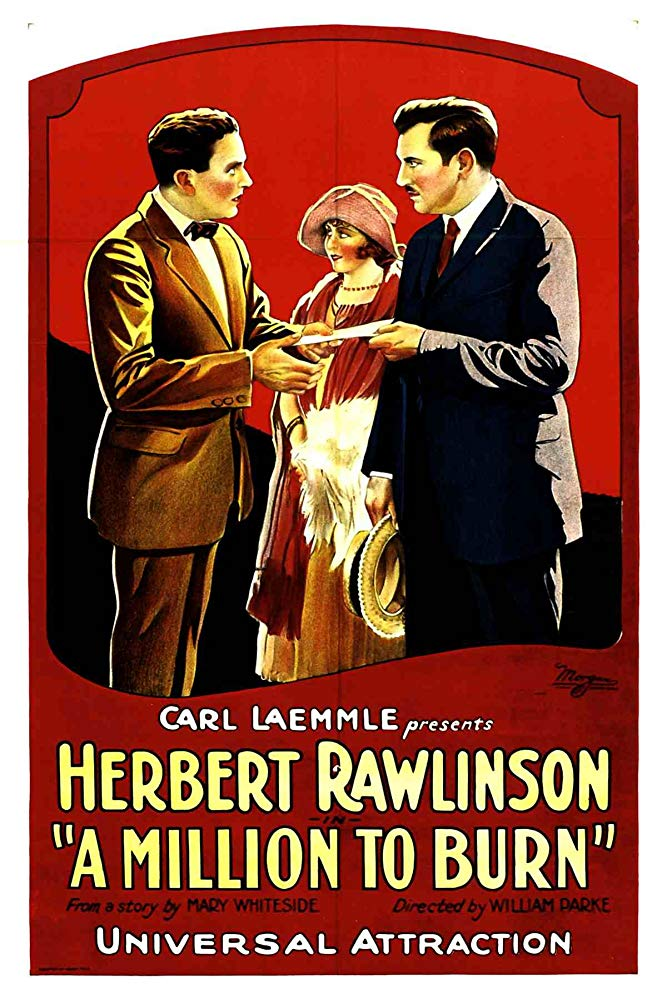
- Theatrical release poster
- Directed by: William Parke
- Screenplay by: Raymond L. Schrock
- Story by: Tom Whitside
- Starring: Herbert Rawlinson; Kalla Pasha; Beatrice Burnham; Tom McGuire; Melbourne MacDowell; Margaret Landis
- Cinematography: John Stumar
- Production company: Universal Pictures
- Distributed by: Universal Pictures
- Release date: October 26, 1923
- Running time: 50 minutes
- Country: United States
- Language: English

A Million to Burn is a 1923 American comedy film directed by William Parke and written by Raymond L. Schrock. The film stars Herbert Rawlinson, Kalla Pasha, Beatrice Burnham, Tom McGuire, Melbourne MacDowell and Margaret Landis. The film was released on October 26, 1923, by Universal Pictures.

== Cast ==
- Herbert Rawlinson as Thomas Gwynne
- Kalla Pasha as Nickoli Rubnov
- Beatrice Burnham as Daisy Jones
- Tom McGuire as P.D. Riley
- Melbourne MacDowell as Mark Mills
- Margaret Landis as Sybil Mills
- George F. Marion as Old Ben Marlowe
- Fred R. Stanton as Langden
- Frederick Bertrand as The Auditor

== Preservation ==
The film is now considered lost.
