= Harriet and the Piper =

1920 film

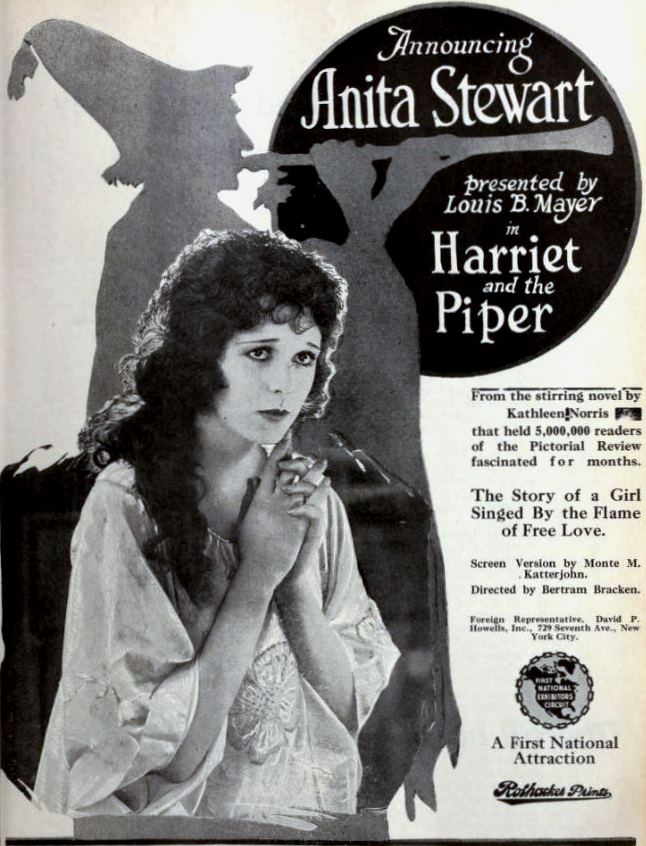
- Advertisement
- Directed by: Bertram Bracken
- Screenplay by: Monte M. Katterjohn
- Based on: Harriet and the Piper by Kathleen Norris
- Produced by: Louis B. Mayer; Anita Stewart
- Starring: Anita Stewart; Ward Crane; Charles Richman; Myrtle Stedman; Margaret Landis; Byron Munson
- Cinematography: René Guissart
- Production companies: Anita Stewart Productions; Louis B. Mayer Productions
- Distributed by: First National Exhibitors' Circuit
- Release date: September 13, 1920
- Running time: 60 minutes
- Country: United States
- Language: Silent (English intertitles)

Harriet and the Piper is a 1920 American drama film directed by Bertram Bracken and written by Monte M. Katterjohn. It is based on the 1920 novel Harriet and the Piper by Kathleen Norris. The film stars Anita Stewart, Ward Crane, Charles Richman, Myrtle Stedman, Margaret Landis, and Byron Munson. The film was released on September 13, 1920, by First National Exhibitors' Circuit.

== Cast ==
- Anita Stewart as Harriet Field
- Ward Crane as Royal Blondin
- Charles Richman as Richard Carter
- Myrtle Stedman as Isabelle Carter
- Margaret Landis as Nina Carter
- Byron Munson as Ward Carter
- Loyola O'Connor as Madame Carter
- Irving Cummings as Anthony Pope
- Barbara La Marr as Tam O'Shanter Girl
