= Margaret Landis =

American actress (1890–1981)

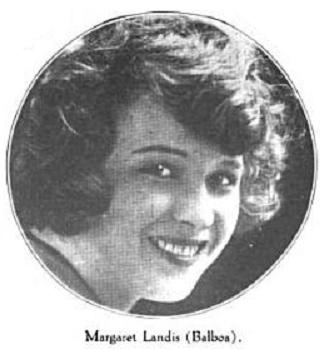
- Born: August 31, 1891; Nashville, Tennessee, U.S.
- Died: April 8, 1981 (aged 89); Oakland, California, U.S.
- Education: Ward-Belmont Seminary
- Occupation: Actress
- Spouse(s): Bertram Bracken m. 1919, div. 1924; James Hamilton Couper m. 1930
- Relatives: Cullen Landis (brother)

Margaret Cullen Landis Bracken Couper (August 31, 1890 – April 8, 1981) was an American silent screen actress who appeared in at least 41 films between 1915 and 1931.

== Early life and education ==
Margaret Cullen Landis was born in Nashville, Tennessee, the daughter of Lulan and Margaret (née Cullen) Landis. Her father was a stockbroker and her younger brother, Cullen Landis was a successful silent film director and actor. She attended Ward-Belmont Seminary in Tennessee.

== Career ==
Landis began her film career at Balboa Studios as a dancer in the 1915 film Who Pays. "I've found dancing before the camera entirely different from so-called stage dancing," she told a magazine in 1916. "The space in which one has to work is so much smaller. You have to adapt your steps and go much slower." She took some time off to study art, eventually returning to film work around 1921. She was considered versatile, and was cast in melodramas, comedies, and Westerns. Both Margaret and her brother Cullen left Hollywood soon after the arrival of sound; she had a Tennessee accent, which may have been a factor. Margaret Landis’ last film was the talkie Sheer Luck (1931).

Landis also acted on the stage; on Broadway she appeared in One of the Family in 1926. She had a role in Lombardi, Ltd., when it was produced in California in 1928, and in Australia in 1929.

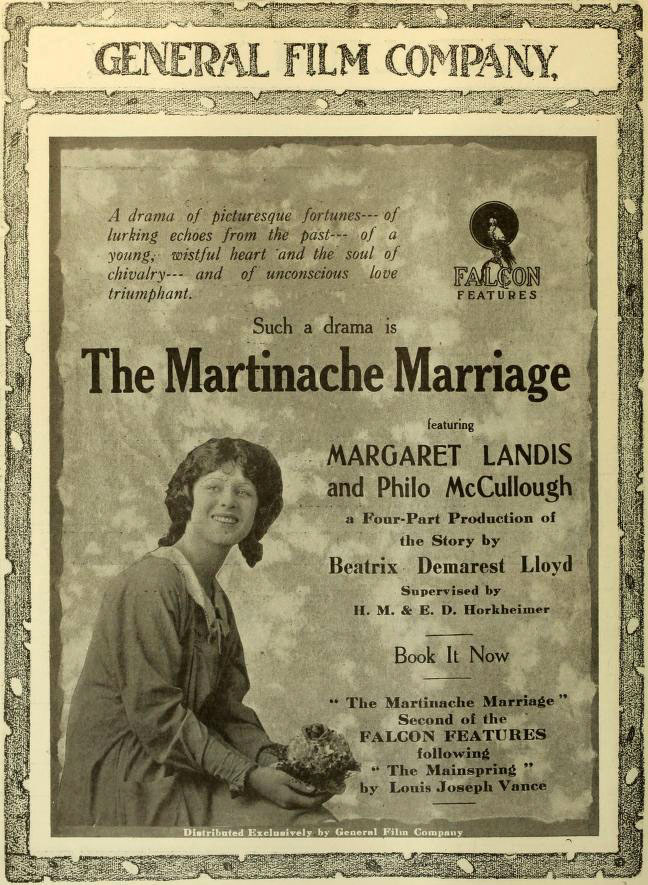
The Martinache Marriage (1917)

== Personal life ==
Landis married film director Bertram Bracken on April 5, 1919, and they divorced in 1924. She married James Hamilton Couper, a World War I veteran who came from a prominent Georgia Coast family, in 1930. Landis had a stroke in 1969, and died in 1981, at the age of 89, in Alameda, California. Her grave is with her second husband's, at the Fort Rosecrans National Cemetery.

== Selected filmography ==
- Broken Fetters (1916)
- Mismates (1916)
- The Best Man (1917)
- The Martinache Marriage (1917)
- Code of the Yukon (1918)
- Feet of Clay (1918)
- Amarilly of Clothes-Line Alley (1918)
- Mr. Fix-It (1918)
- The Confession (1920)
- Parted Curtains (1920)
- Harriet and the Piper (1920)
- Sowing the Wind (1921)
- Ashes (1922)
- The Ladder Jinx (1922)
- Chasing the Jinx (1922)
- Rose o' the Sea (1922)
- Alice Adams (1923)
- What Wives Want (1923)
- The Cricket on the Hearth (1923)
- The Love Brand (1923)
- The Miracle Baby (1923)
- A Million to Burn (1923)
- The Slanderers (1924)
- Passion's Pathway (1924)
- The Western Wallop (1924)
- Her Man (1924)
- Fighter's Paradise (1924)
- A Fighting Heart (1924)
- The Empire Builders (1924)
- Trigger Fingers (1924)
- My Man (1924)
- An Enemy Of Men (1925)
- Youth and Adventure (1925)
- The Latest from Paris (1928)
- Sheer Luck (1931)
