= The Love Brand =

1923 film

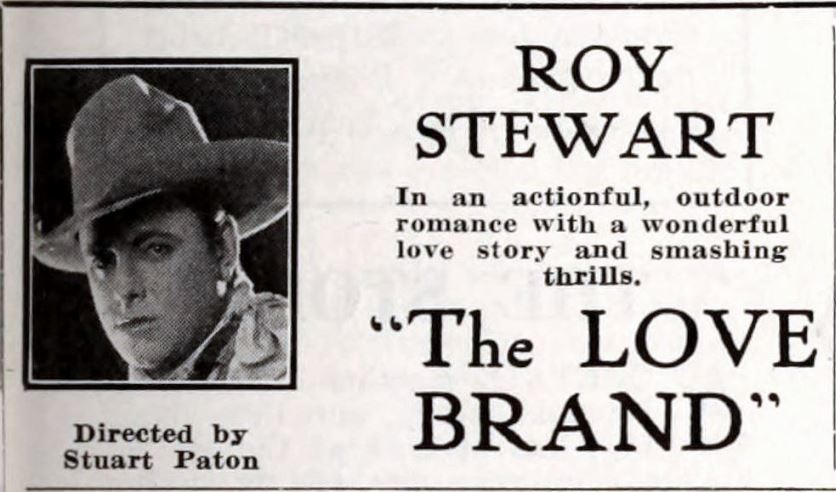
- Advertisement
- Directed by: Stuart Paton
- Screenplay by: Raymond L. Schrock; Adrian Johnson
- Story by: Adrian Johnson
- Starring: Roy Stewart; Wilfrid North; Margaret Landis; Arthur Stuart Hull; Sidney De Gray; Marie Wells
- Cinematography: William Thornley
- Production company: Universal Pictures
- Distributed by: Universal Pictures
- Release date: August 13, 1923
- Running time: 50 minutes
- Country: United States
- Languages: Silent; English intertitles

The Love Brand is a 1923 American silent Western film directed by Stuart Paton and written by Raymond L. Schrock and Adrian Johnson. The film stars Roy Stewart, Wilfrid North, Margaret Landis, Arthur Stuart Hull, Sidney De Gray, and Marie Wells. The film was released on August 13, 1923, by Universal Pictures.

== Cast ==
- Roy Stewart as Don José O'Neil
- Wilfrid North as Peter Collier
- Margaret Landis as Frances Collier
- Arthur Stuart Hull as Charles Mortimer
- Sidney De Gray as Miguel Salvador
- Marie Wells as Teresa
