= Ben Deeley =

American actor (1878–1924)

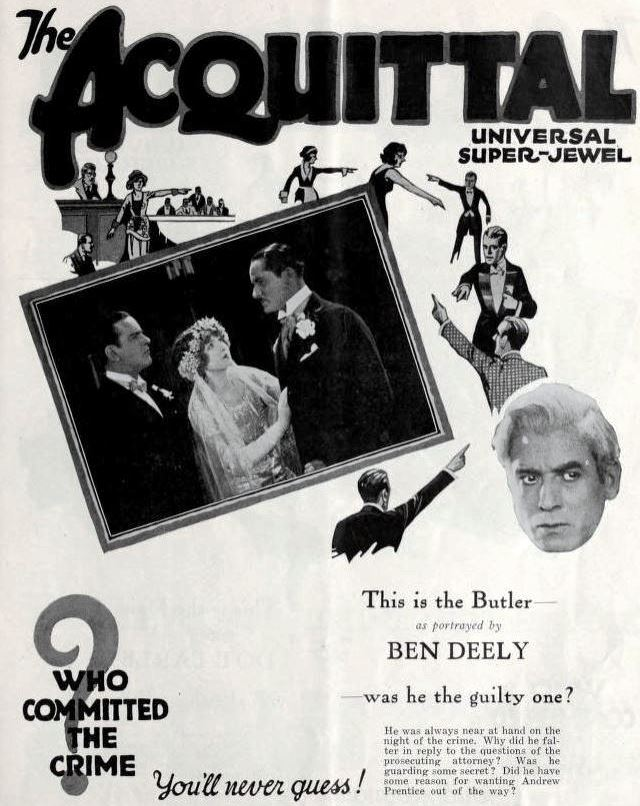
- Advertisement for The Acquittal (1923) featuring Deeley
- Born: J. Bernard Z. Deeley; 22 January 1878; Folsom, California
- Died: 23 September 1924 (aged 46); Hollywood, California
- Occupation: Actor
- Years active: 1915-1924
- Spouse(s): Marie Wayne; Barbara La Marr

Ben Deeley (January 22, 1878 - September 23, 1924) born J. Bernard Deeley also credited as Ben Deely, was an American actor and composer.

== Biography ==
Born in 1878, Deeley appeared in silent films, never having lived to the talkie era. He composed a popular ragtime song called The Kleptomaniac Rag in 1913. His best known performance in films is the strange powdered character Mr. Jones in Maurice Tourneur's Victory alongside Lon Chaney, Jack Holt, and Wallace Beery. He was at one time married to Marie Wayne, who costarred with him in The Patchwork Girl of Oz (1914), and to actress Barbara La Marr.

Deeley died of double pneumonia.

== Selected filmography ==
- The Patchwork Girl of Oz (1914)
- East Lynne (1916) *(with Theda Bara)
- In Pursuit of Polly (1918) (*with Billie Burke)
- Victory (1919)
- Flames of the Flesh (1920)
- The Tattlers (1920)
- The Iron Heart (1920)
- A Sister to Salome (1920)
- Would You Forgive? (1920)
- Sowing the Wind (1921)
- Kazan (1921)
- Molly O (1921)
- Where's My Wandering Boy Tonight? (1922)
- The Crossroads of New York (1922)
- Lights Out (1923)
- The Acquittal (1923)
- Passion's Pathway (1924)
- Winner Take All (1924)
- The Cyclone Rider (1924)
- Never the Twain Shall Meet (1925)
