= In Pursuit of Polly =

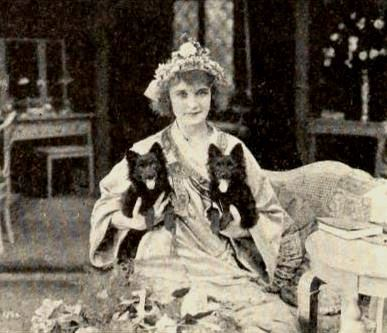
- Still with Burke
- Directed by: Chester Withey
- Written by: Izola Forrester (story); Mann Page (story); Eve Unsell (scenario)
- Produced by: Adolph Zukor; Jesse Lasky
- Starring: Billie Burke; Thomas Meighan
- Cinematography: William Marshall
- Production company: Famous Players–Lasky Corporation
- Distributed by: Paramount Pictures
- Release date: September 1, 1918
- Running time: 50 minutes
- Country: United States
- Language: Silent (English intertitles)

In Pursuit of Polly is a lost 1918 American silent comedy-drama film starring Billie Burke and Thomas Meighan. It was produced by Famous Players–Lasky and released by Paramount Pictures.

== Plot ==
As described in a film magazine, Polly Marsden is told by her father Buck Marsden that she must choose from among her three suitors. She decides to settle it by a race. She is to be given an hour head start and agrees to bestow her hand upon the first one who catches her. In trying to elude her pursuers, she is mistaken for the confederate of a German spy. When the three suitors catch her, they discover that her heart and hand have been won by secret service agent Colby Mason.

== Cast ==
- Billie Burke as Polly Marsden
- Thomas Meighan as Colby Mason
- Frank Losee as Buck Marsden
- A. J. Herbert as Talbot Sturgis
- William B. Davidson as Larry O'Malley
- Alfred Hickman as O'Leary
- Ben Deeley as Emile Kremer
