= The Purple Riders =

1922 film

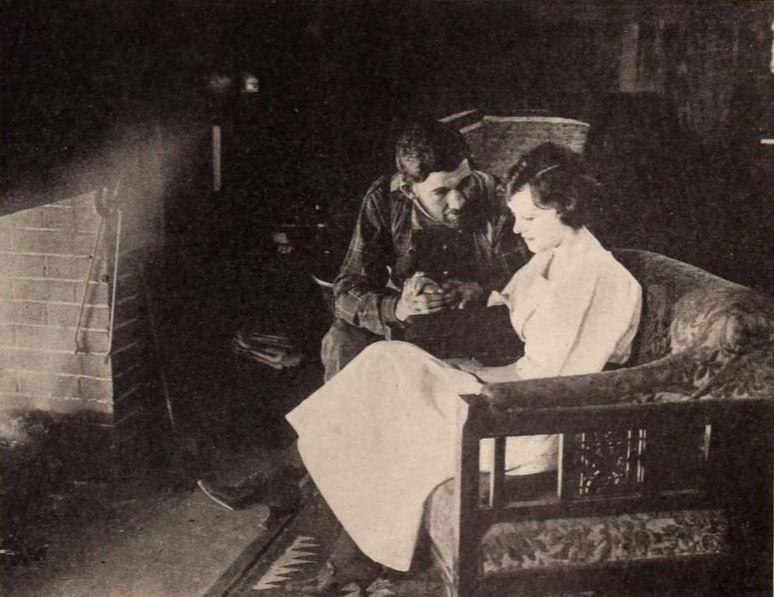
- Directed by: William Bertram
- Written by: Cleveland Moffett; Albert E. Smith
- Starring: Elinor Field; Ernest Shields; Charles Dudley
- Production company: Vitagraph Company of America
- Distributed by: Vitagraph Company of America
- Release date: July 3, 1922
- Running time: 15 chapters
- Country: United States
- Languages: Silent; English intertitles

The Purple Riders is a 1922 American silent Western film serial directed by William Bertram and starring Elinor Field, Ernest Shields and Charles Dudley.

== Cast ==
- Joe Ryan as Sheriff Dick Ranger
- Elinor Field as Betty Marsh
- Ernest Shields as Gerald Marsh
- Walter Rodgers as Stephen Marsh
- Charles Dudley as'Doc' Dreamer
- Maude Emory as Red Feather
- Joe Rickson as Rudolph Myers

== Bibliography ==
- Connelly, Robert B. The Silents: Silent Feature Films, 1910-36, Volume 40, Issue 2. December Press, 1998.
- Munden, Kenneth White. The American Film Institute Catalog of Motion Pictures Produced in the United States, Part 1. University of California Press, 1997.
