= The Ladder Jinx =

1922 film

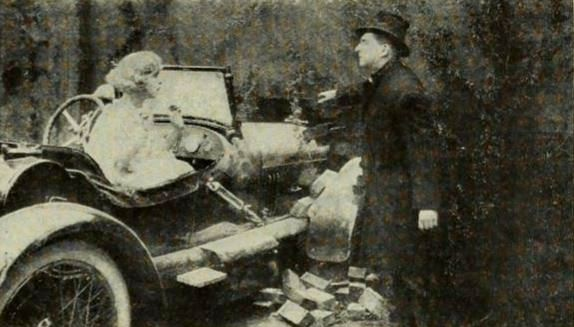
- Directed by: Jess Robbins
- Written by: Edgar Franklin; David Kirkland
- Produced by: Albert E. Smith
- Starring: Edward Everett Horton; Margaret Landis; Tully Marshall
- Cinematography: Irving Reis
- Production company: Vitagraph Company of America
- Distributed by: Vitagraph Company of America
- Release date: August 20, 1922
- Running time: 60 minutes
- Country: United States
- Languages: Silent; English intertitles

The Ladder Jinx is a 1922 American silent comedy film directed by Jess Robbins and starring Edward Everett Horton, Margaret Landis and Tully Marshall.

== Cast ==
- Edward Everett Horton as Arthur Barnes
- Margaret Landis as Helen Wilbur
- Wilbur Higby as James Wilbur
- Tully Marshall as Peter Stalton
- Otis Harlan as Thams Gridley
- Colin Kenny as Richard Twing
- Tom McGuire as Judge Brown
- Will Walling as Officer Murphy
- Tom Murray as Detective Smith
- Ernest Shields as Cheyenne Harry
- Max Asher as Sam

== Bibliography ==
- Connelly, Robert B. The Silents: Silent Feature Films, 1910-36, Volume 40, Issue 2. December Press, 1998.
- Munden, Kenneth White. The American Film Institute Catalog of Motion Pictures Produced in the United States, Part 1. University of California Press, 1997.
