= Honesty – The Best Policy =

1926 film by Chester Bennett

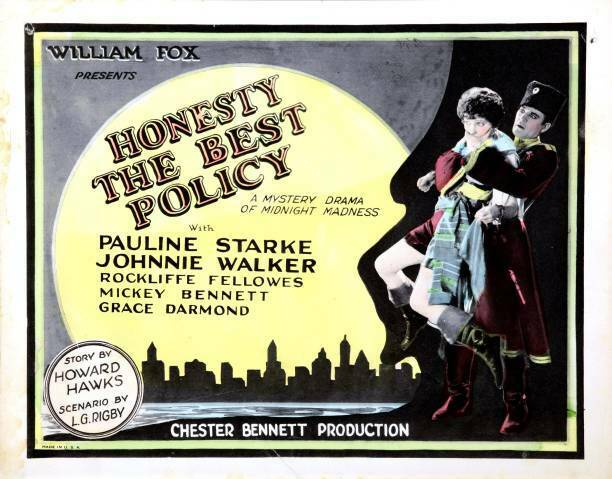
- Directed by: Chester Bennett; Albert Ray
- Written by: Howard Hawks (story); Gordon Rigby
- Produced by: William Fox
- Starring: Rockliffe Fellowes; Pauline Starke; Johnnie Walker
- Cinematography: Ernest Palmer
- Production company: Fox Film
- Distributed by: Fox Film
- Release date: August 8, 1926
- Running time: 50 minutes
- Country: United States
- Language: Silent (English intertitles)

Honesty – The Best Policy is a 1926 American silent comedy film directed by Chester Bennett and Albert Ray and starring Rockliffe Fellowes, Pauline Starke, and Johnnie Walker. Bennett was the primary director of the film and Ray was brought in later to shoot an additional sequence featuring Albert Gran and Dot Farley.

== Cast ==
- Rockliffe Fellowes as Nick Randall
- Pauline Starke as Mary Kay
- Johnnie Walker as Robert Dore
- Grace Darmond as Lily
- Mickey Bennett as Freckled Boy
- Mack Swain as Bendy Joe
- Albert Gran as Publisher (added sequence)
- Dot Farley as Author's Wife (added sequence)
- Heinie Conklin as Piano Player

== Preservation ==
Honesty - The Best Policy is currently presumed lost. In February of 2021, the film was cited by the National Film Preservation Board on their Lost U.S. Silent Feature Films list.

== Bibliography ==
- Solomon, Aubrey. The Fox Film Corporation, 1915-1935: A History and Filmography. McFarland, 2011.
