= The Acquittal =

1923 film by Clarence Brown

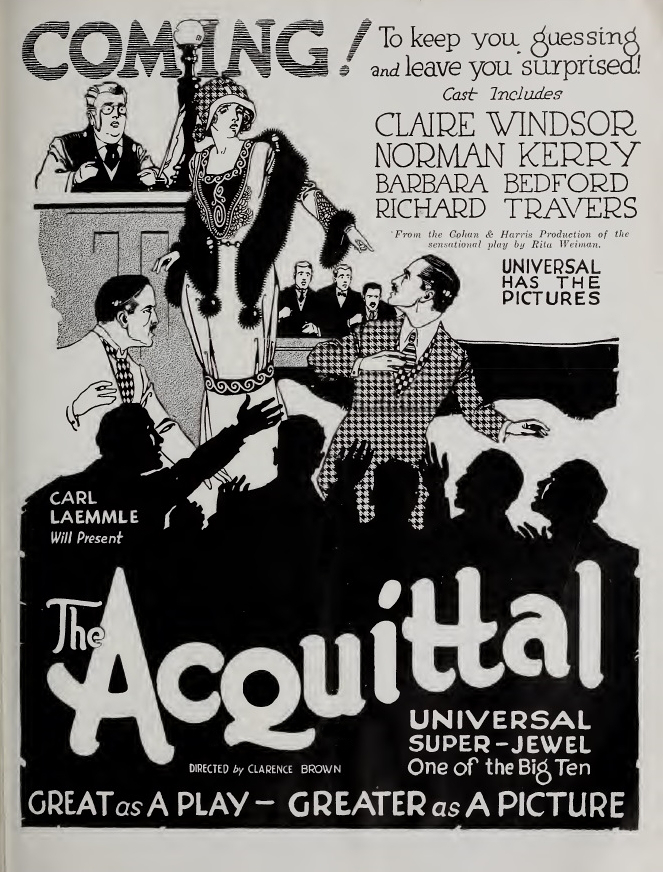
- Advertisement in Universal Weekly
- Directed by: Clarence Brown
- Written by: Jules Furthman
- Screenplay by: Raymond L. Schrock
- Based on: The Acquittal by Rita Weiman
- Starring: Claire Windsor; Norman Kerry; Richard Travers; Barbara Bedford
- Cinematography: Silvano Balboni
- Production company: Universal Pictures
- Distributed by: Universal Pictures
- Release date: 1923
- Running time: 7 reels
- Country: United States
- Language: Silent (English intertitles)

The Acquittal is a 1923 American silent mystery film based on the play of the same name by Rita Weiman. The film was directed by Clarence Brown, who would later start a long career at Metro-Goldwyn-Mayer. The film stars Norman Kerry, Claire Windsor, Richard Travers, and Barbara Bedford. The film was released by Universal Pictures.

== Synopsis ==
As described in a trade magazine:

Who killed Andrew Prentice? Kenneth Winthrop is tried for the murder of his foster-father, Andrew Prentice. His foster-brother, Robert Armstrong is his accuser. Both love Madeline, who has chosen Winthrop. Armstrong alleges that Edith Craig, secretly engaged to the dead man, and Winthrop were in love, but it is not believed. Circumstantial evidence is introduced offering the time as given by a certain clock. Madeline discovers that what they took for a clock in a butcher's store window was a circular meat scale, the hand of which stays at twelve, the top of the scale, when not in use. This discovery clears her husband. A postal inspector produces a letter written on the night of the murder by Prentice, which had been stolen in a mail holdup and recovered. This letter solves the whole mystery and puts the guilt on the shoulders of Prentice, who then confesses and commits suicide. Madeline finally finds happiness with Armstrong, who has always loved her.

== Cast ==
- Claire Windsor as Madeline Ames
- Norman Kerry as Robert Armstrong
- Richard Travers as Kenneth Winthrop
- Barbara Bedford as Edith Craig
- Charles Wellesley as Andrew Prentice
- Frederick Vroom as Carter Ames
- Mildred Manning as Mrs. Crown
- Ben Deeley as Butler
- Harry Mestayer as District attorney
- Emmett King as Minister
- Dot Farley as Maid
- Hayden Stevenson as Taxi driver

== Reviews and reception ==
George T. Pardy wrote in the Exhibitor's Trade Review that Brown had "utilized the flashback with excellent effect in developing the evidence in the case, and right here it should be stated that the courtroom stuff, so frequently overdone and burdened with unnecessary wearisome detail where the average film is concerned, is handled with such dexterity and colorful appeal that the trial scene rivets the spectator's attention from the beginning to end". Mary Mac said of the film in the Universal Weekly, that "there's a real mystery for you to set your teeth into. You may figure yourself into delirium and you'll probably figure wrong. The picture has been excellently directed, well knit, shorn of irrelevant details, full of suspense, and building steadily and forcefully up to its climaxes".

A theater manager in Seattle, invited the prosecuting attorneys, county officials, and fifteen law students to a special screening of the film, where he passed out printed ballots for the guests to mark as to who they thought was guilty. Only 4 out of 137 guessed correctly who the murderer was.

== Preservation ==
A print of The Acquittal is held in the Library of Congress archives in the Raymond Rohauer collection.
