= Blinky (film) =

1923 film directed by Edward Sedgwick

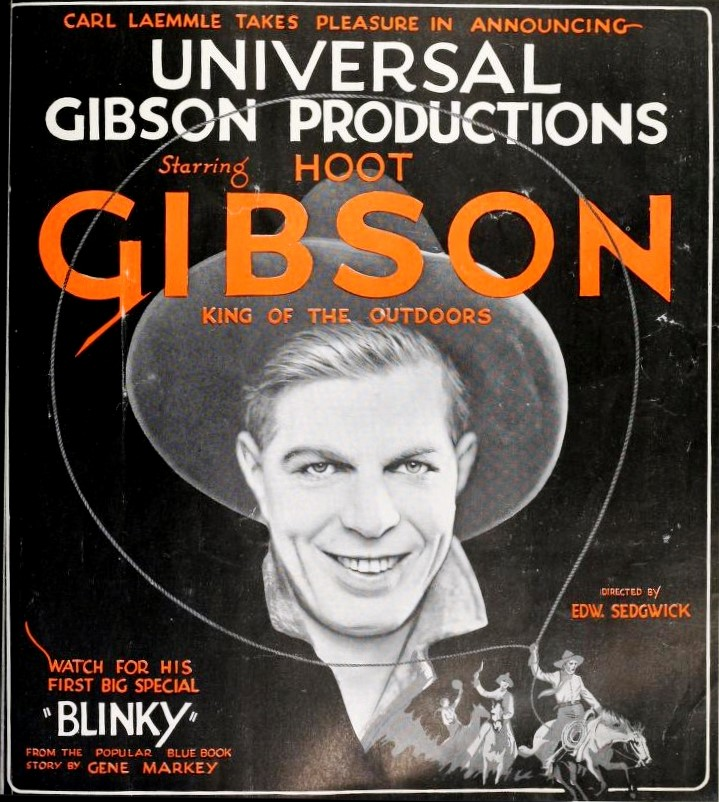
- Trade advertisement
- Directed by: Edward Sedgwick
- Written by: Edward Sedgwick
- Based on: "Blinky" by Gene Markey
- Starring: Hoot Gibson; Esther Ralston
- Cinematography: Virgil Miller
- Distributed by: Universal Pictures
- Release date: August 17, 1923
- Running time: 60 minutes
- Country: United States
- Language: Silent (English intertitles)

Blinky is a 1923 American silent Western comedy film directed by Edward Sedgwick and starring Hoot Gibson and Esther Ralston.

== Plot ==
Geoffrey "Blinky" Islip is forced to join the United States Cavalry by his father Colonel "Raw Meat" Islip. Although Islip is ridiculed and hazed on assignment to the Mexico–United States border, he uses his skills learned from Boy Scouts to rescue his commanding officer Major Kileen's daughter Mary Lou from kidnappers.

== Cast ==
- Hoot Gibson as Geoffrey Arbuthnot Islip (Blinky)
- Esther Ralston as Mary Lou Kileen
- Mathilde Brundage as Mrs. Islip
- DeWitt Jennings as Colonel "Raw Meat" Islip
- Elinor Field as Priscilla Islip
- D.R.O. Hatswell as Bertrand Van Dusen
- Charles K. French as Major Kileen
- John Judd as Husk Barton
- W. E. Lawrence as Lieutenant Rawkins (credited as William E. Lawrence)

== Production ==
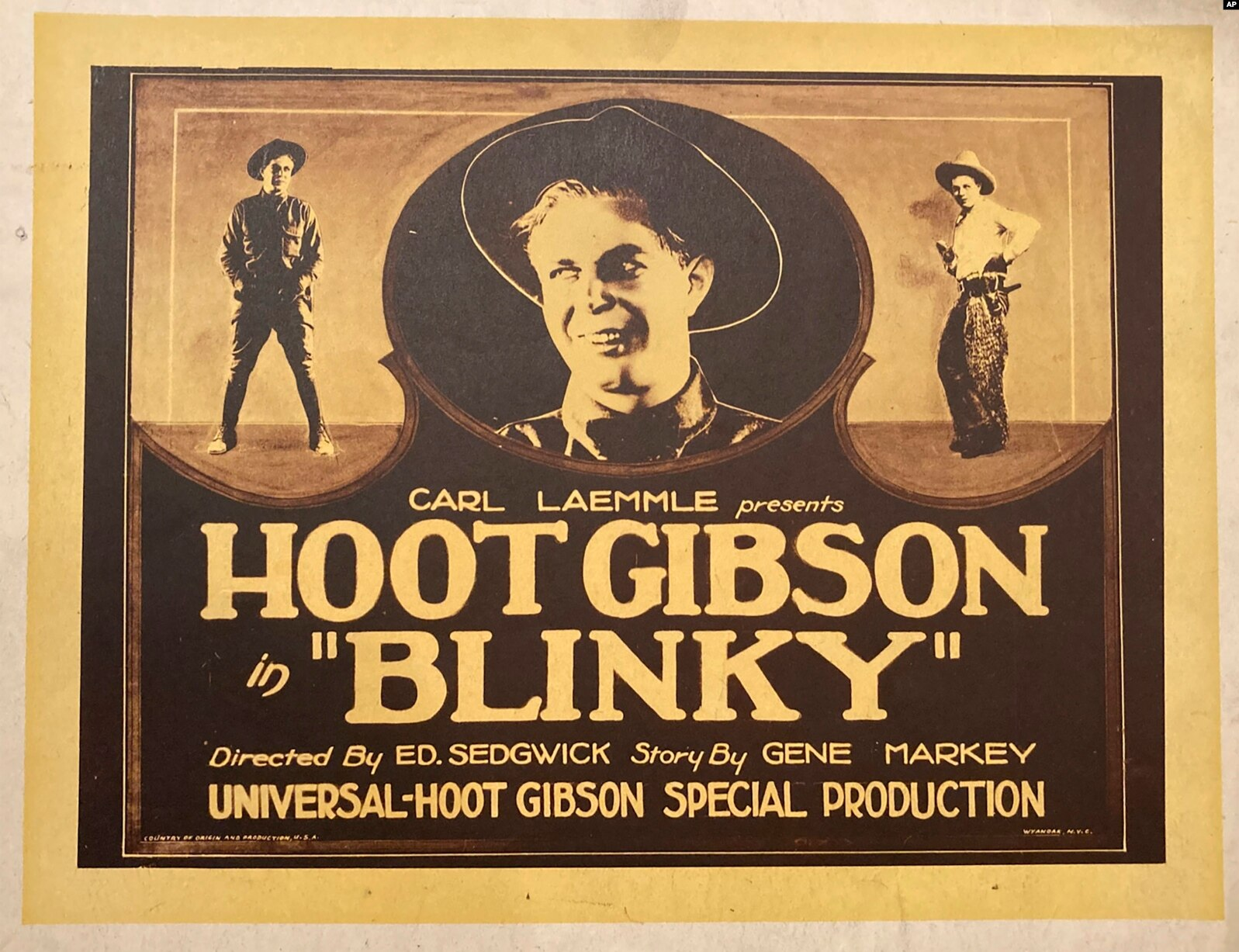
Lobby card for the film

The film was shot at Universal City Studios and Imperial Beach, California. Real-life cavalrymen from Camp Hearne were used as extras. Sedgewick broke his leg during the production.

== Preservation ==
With no prints of Blinky located in any film archives, it is a lost film.

== See also ==
- Hoot Gibson filmography
