= The Secret of the Hills =

1921 silent film

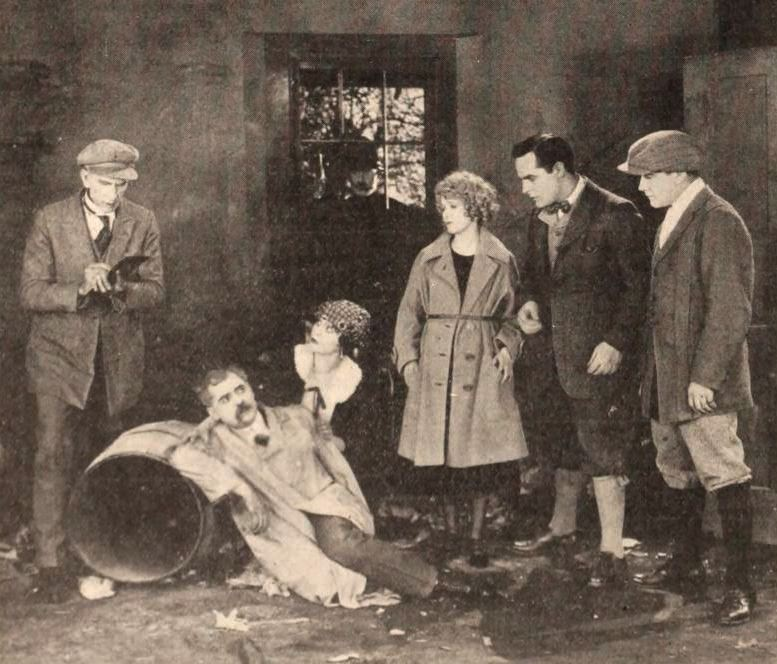
- Directed by: Chester Bennett
- Written by: William Garrett (novel); E. Magnus Ingleton
- Produced by: Albert E. Smith
- Starring: Antonio Moreno; Lillian Hall; Kingsley Benedict
- Cinematography: Jack MacKenzie
- Production company: Vitagraph Company of America
- Distributed by: Vitagraph Company of America
- Release date: September 25, 1921
- Running time: 50 minutes
- Country: United States
- Languages: Silent; English intertitles

The Secret of the Hills is a 1921 American silent mystery film directed by Chester Bennett and starring Antonio Moreno, Lillian Hall and Kingsley Benedict

== Plot ==
While in London an American newspapermen becomes drawn into a deadly intrigue involving the lost treasure of James III of Scotland.

== Cast ==
- Antonio Moreno as Guy Fenton
- Lillian Hall as Marion
- Kingsley Benedict as Lincoln Drew
- George Clair as Francis Freeland
- Walter Rodgers as Benjamin Miltimore
- Elita Proctor Otis as Mrs. Miltimore
- J. Gunnis Davis as Richards
- Frank Thorne as De Vrillefort
- Arthur Sharpe as Sidney Coleridge

== Bibliography ==
- Wlaschin, Ken . Silent Mystery and Detective Movies: A Comprehensive Filmography. McFarland, 2009.
