= Duty's Reward =

1927 silent film

- Directed by: Bertram Bracken
- Written by: Barry Barringer
- Produced by: William T. Lackey
- Starring: Alan Roscoe; Eva Novak; Lou Archer
- Cinematography: Robert E. Cline; Hap Depew
- Production company: W.T. Lackey Productions
- Distributed by: Ellbee Pictures
- Release date: June 10, 1927
- Running time: 60 minutes
- Country: United States
- Languages: Silent; English intertitles

Duty's Reward is a 1927 American silent drama film directed by Bertram Bracken and starring Alan Roscoe, Eva Novak and Lou Archer.

== Cast ==
- Alan Roscoe as Richard Webster
- Eva Novak as Dorothy Thompson
- Lou Archer as 'Peek' Harvey
- Eddie Brownell as Spencer Haynes
- George Fawcett as James Thompson

== Bibliography ==
- Robert B. Connelly. The Silents: Silent Feature Films, 1910-36, Volume 40, Issue 2. December Press, 1998.
