= The Purple Cipher =

1920 silent film

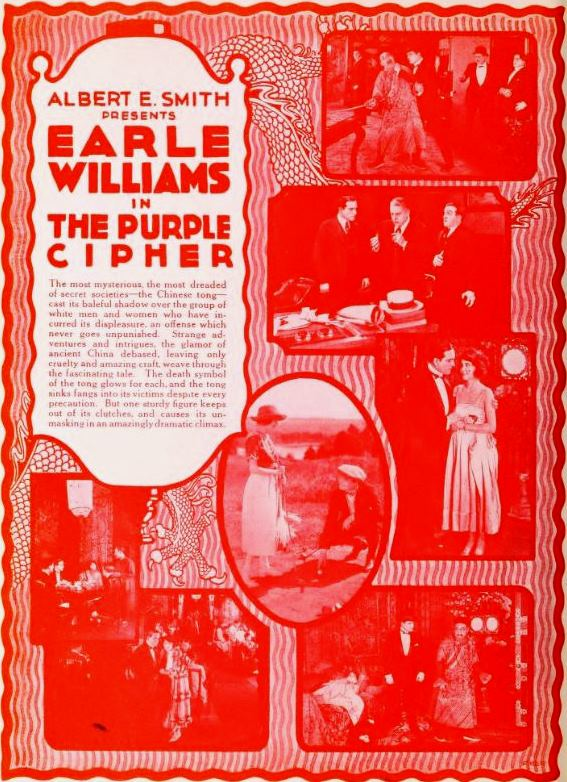
- Directed by: Chester Bennett
- Written by: J. Grubb Alexander
- Based on: The Purple Hieroglyph by Murray Leinster
- Produced by: Albert E. Smith
- Starring: Earle Williams; Vola Vale; Ernest Shields
- Cinematography: Jack MacKenzie
- Production company: Vitagraph Company of America
- Distributed by: Vitagraph Company of America
- Release date: October 11, 1920
- Running time: 50 minutes
- Country: United States
- Languages: Silent; English intertitles

The Purple Cipher is a 1920 American silent mystery film directed by Chester Bennett and starring Earle Williams, Vola Vale and Ernest Shields. Shot by Vitagraph at the company's Brooklyn studios, it was based on the short story The Purple Hieroglyph by Murray Leinster. The story was adapted twice more in the sound era as Murder Will Out (1930) and Torchy Blane in Chinatown (1939).

== Cast ==
- Earle Williams as Leonard Staunton
- Vola Vale as Jeanne Baldwin
- Ernest Shields as Jack Baldwin
- Allan Forrest as Alan Fitzhugh
- Henry A. Barrows as Frank Condon
- Goro Kino as Hop Lee
- Frank M. Seki as Wong Foo

== Bibliography ==
- Billee J. Stallings & Jo-an J. Evans. Murray Leinster: The Life and Works. McFarland, 2011.
