= Hearts and Masks =

1921 silent film

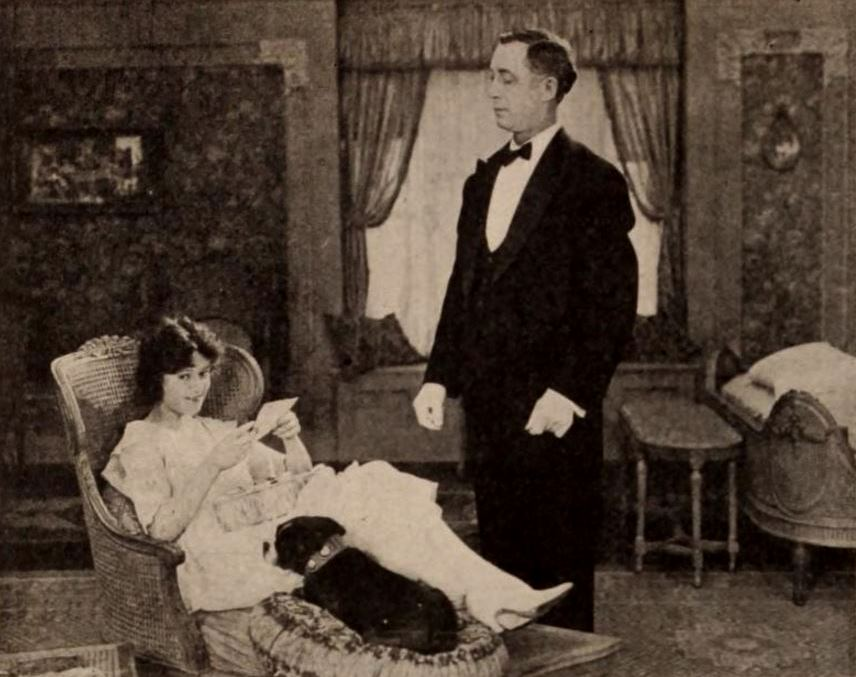
- Directed by: William A. Seiter
- Written by: Mildred Considine
- Starring: Elinor Field; Francis McDonald; Lloyd Bacon
- Cinematography: Walter L. Griffin
- Production company: Federated Productions
- Distributed by: Film Booking Offices of America
- Release date: July 1, 1921
- Running time: 50 minutes
- Country: United States
- Languages: Silent; English intertitles

Hearts and Masks is a 1921 American silent comedy film directed by William A. Seiter and starring Elinor Field, Francis McDonald and Lloyd Bacon.

== Cast ==
- Elinor Field as Alice Gaynor
- Francis McDonald as Galloping Dick
- Lloyd Bacon as Richard Comstock
- John Cossar as John Gaynor
- Mollie McConnell as Mrs. Graves

== Bibliography ==
- Munden, Kenneth White. The American Film Institute Catalog of Motion Pictures Produced in the United States, Part 1. University of California Press, 1997.
