= Fred Whitman (actor) =

American actor (1887–1945)

- Born: November 15, 1887; Findlay, Ohio, U.S.
- Died: October 11, 1945
- Occupation: Actor

Frederick J. Whitman (November 15, 1887 – October 11, 1945) was an American actor during the silent film era.

He was born in Findlay, Ohio. His early career started in 1904 as a teenaged stage actor in stock companies located in the American south and midwest. In November 1913, Whitman joined the Balboa Feature Film Company in Long Beach, California. One of his early films was The Path To Sorrow (1913), a short silent film by director Bertram Bracken.

== Filmography ==
- The Path To Sorrow (1913)
- St. Elmo (1914), as Dent
- The Red Circle (1915)
- Should a Wife Forgive? (1915)
- The Home Breakers (1916), as Gerald Sanderson
- A Branded Soul (1917), as Neil Mathews
