= The Kentucky Colonel =

1920 silent film by William A. Seiter

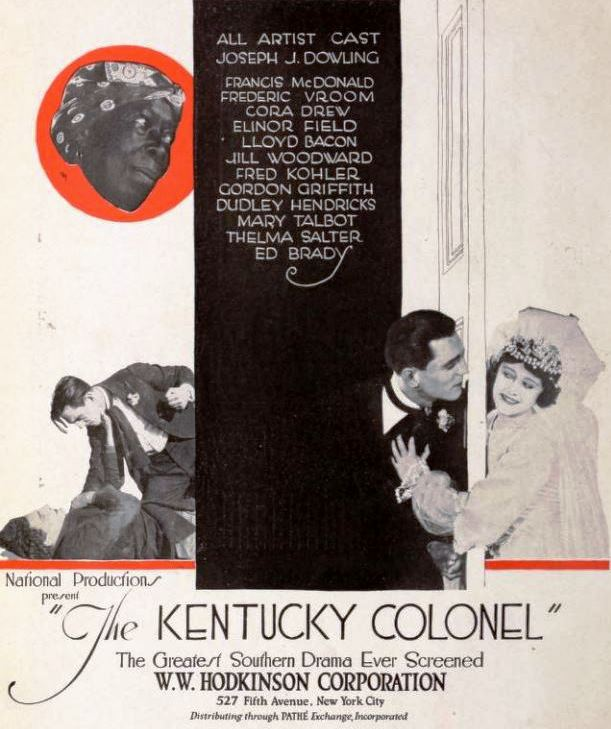
- Directed by: William A. Seiter
- Written by: L.V. Jefferson
- Based on: A Kentucky Colonel by Opie Read
- Starring: Joseph J. Dowling; Frederick Vroom; Elinor Field
- Cinematography: Allen M. Davey; Bert Glennon
- Production company: National Film Corporation of America
- Distributed by: Hodkinson Pictures
- Release date: September 26, 1920
- Running time: 60 minutes
- Country: United States
- Languages: Silent; English intertitles

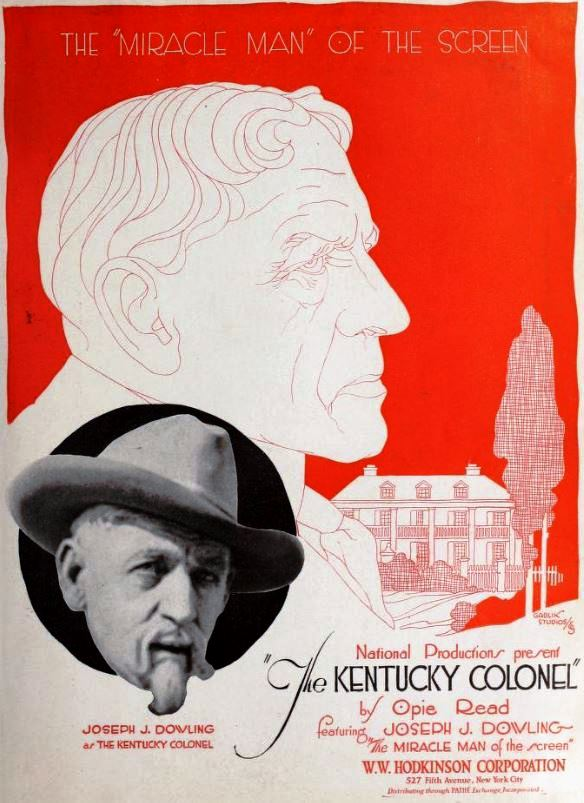
1920 ad

The Kentucky Colonel is a 1920 American silent drama film directed by William A. Seiter and starring Joseph J. Dowling, Frederick Vroom and Elinor Field based on the 1890 best-selling book A Kentucky Colonel by Opie Read.

== Cast ==
- Joseph J. Dowling as Colonel Remington Osbury
- Frederick Vroom as General Buck Hineman
- Elinor Field as Luzelle Hineman
- Francis McDonald as Philip Burwood
- Cora Drew as Mrs. Hineman
- Lloyd Bacon as Boyd Savely
- Jill Woodward as Ella Mayhew
- Fred Kohler as Jim Britsides
- Gordon Griffith as Sam Britsides
- Mae Talbot as Jack Gap
- Thelma Salter as Liza Ann Gap
- Ed Brady as Reverend Gardner Boyle

== See also ==
- List of films and television shows about the American Civil War

== Bibliography ==
- Munden, Kenneth White. The American Film Institute Catalog of Motion Pictures Produced in the United States, Part 1. University of California Press, 1997.
- Singer, Michael. Film Directors: A Complete Guide. Watson-Guptill Publications, Incorporated, 1993.
