= Flames of the Flesh =

1920 silent film by Edward LeSaint

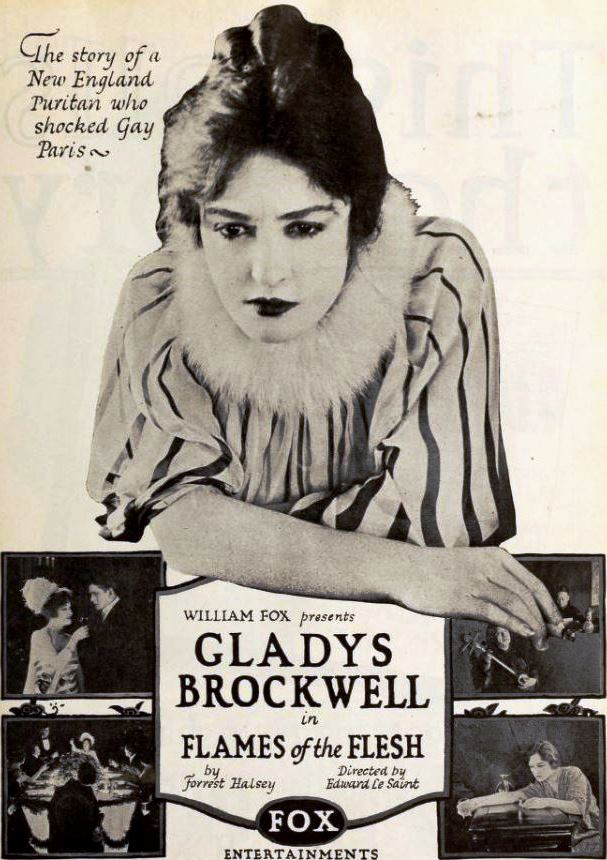
- Advertisement for the Flames of the Flesh, on page 25 of the Exhibitors Herald (December 27, 1919)
- Directed by: Edward LeSaint
- Written by: Forrest Halsey (story); Clara Beranger (story); Dorothy Yost (scenario)
- Starring: Gladys Brockwell; William Scott; Harry Spingler; Ben Deeley; Charles K. French; Louis Fitzroy; Rosita Marstini
- Production company: Fox Film Corporation
- Distributed by: Fox Film Corporation
- Release date: January 1920
- Running time: 5 reels
- Country: United States
- Language: Silent (English intertitles)

Flames of the Flesh is a 1920 American silent drama film directed by Edward LeSaint, and starring Gladys Brockwell, William Scott, Harry Spingler, Ben Deeley, Charles K. French, Louis Fitzroy, and Rosita Marstini. The film was released by Fox Film Corporation in January 1920.

== Cast ==
- Gladys Brockwell as Candace
- William Scott as Bruce Eastcoat
- Harry Spingler as Charles Eastcoat
- Ben Deeley as Craig Boardman
- Charles K. French as Simon Eastcoat
- Louis Fitzroy as Eastcoat's Secretary
- Rosita Marstini as Suzette De Pouges
- Josephine Crowell as Madame Binnat
- Nigel De Brulier as Henri Leland
- Louise Emmons as Undetermined Role (uncredited)

== Preservation ==
With no prints of Flames of the Flesh located in any film archives, it is considered a lost film.

== See also ==
- 1937 Fox vault fire
