= Champion of Lost Causes =

1925 film

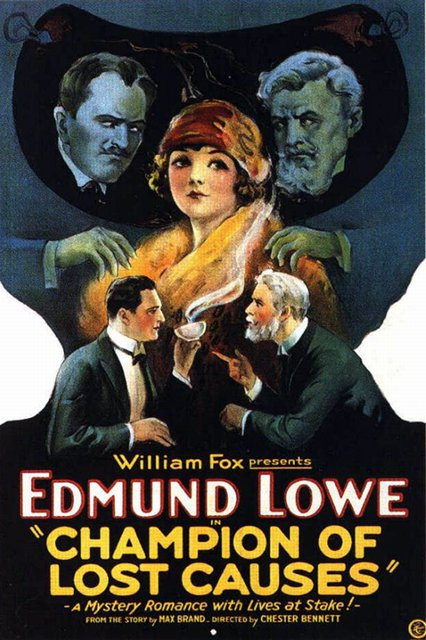
- Theatrical poster
- Directed by: Chester Bennett
- Written by: Thomas Dixon Jr.
- Based on: "Champion of Lost Causes" by Max Brand
- Produced by: William Fox
- Starring: Edmund Lowe; Barbara Bedford; Walter McGrail
- Cinematography: Ernest Palmer
- Production company: Fox Film Corporation
- Distributed by: Fox Film Corporation
- Release date: January 22, 1925
- Running time: 50 minutes
- Country: United States
- Language: Silent (English intertitles)

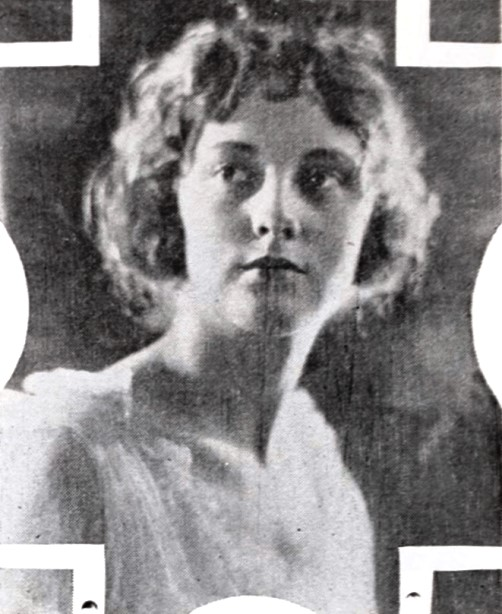
Barbara Bedford, 1925

Champion of Lost Causes is a lost 1925 American silent mystery film directed by Chester Bennett and starring Edmund Lowe, Barbara Bedford, and Walter McGrail. A writer in search of a story visits a gambling club and witnesses a murder, which he attempts to solve.

== Plot ==
As described in a film magazine review, Loring, an author, in getting material for a book, goes to a gambling den. He sees Wilbur, who acts strangely. He follows him and when Wilbur is killed, Peter Charles, father of Beatrice Charles, is accused of the murder. The gambler gives him a fictitious story about a murderous gang when Loring attempts to solve the murder mystery. Several attempts are made on his life by the gang but fail. The gambler proves to be Beatrice’s villainous fiancee, and when he confesses the murder Loring wins the young woman.

== Cast ==
- Edmund Lowe as Loring
- Barbara Bedford as Beatrice Charles
- Walter McGrail as Zanten / Dick Sterling
- Jack McDonald as Joseph Wilbur
- Alec B. Francis as Peter Charles

== Preservation ==
With no prints of Champion of Lost Causes located in any film archives, it is a lost film.

== Bibliography ==
- Solomon, Aubrey. The Fox Film Corporation, 1915-1935: A History and Filmography. McFarland, 2011.
