= Nomads of the North =

1920 film by David Hartford

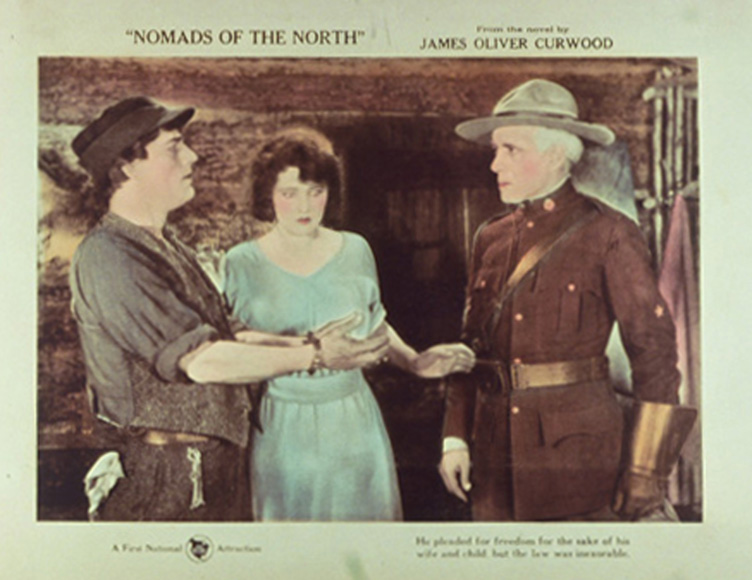
- Lobby card with Chaney, Blythe, and Stone
- Directed by: David Hartford; James Oliver Curwood
- Written by: David Hartford; James Oliver Curwood
- Based on: Nomads of the North by James Oliver Curwood
- Produced by: James Oliver Curwood
- Starring: Betty Blythe; Lon Chaney; Lewis Stone; Melbourne MacDowell
- Cinematography: Walter L. Griffin
- Production company: James Oliver Curwood Productions Inc.
- Distributed by: Associated First National Pictures, Inc.
- Release date: October 11, 1920
- Running time: 103 minutes
- Country: United States
- Language: Silent (English intertitles)

Nomads of the North (1920)

Nomads of the North is a 1920 American drama film of the North Woods co-directed and co-written by David Hartford and James Oliver Curwood, and featuring Lon Chaney, Betty Blythe, and Lewis Stone. The film was based on Curwood's own 1919 novel of the same name (he also produced the film). The film still exists in complete form and is available on DVD. The film's original poster also still exists.

== Plot ==
In a small rural village, impoverished Nanette Roland refuses to marry the villainous Buck McDougall until she is convinced that her long-absent fiancé, Raoul Challoner, is dead. Buck obtains false evidence of Challoner's death and Nanette sadly consents to be married, mainly for her bankrupt old father's sake. (Raoul had gone away months earlier on a hunting expedition and never returned.)

At Nanette's wedding ceremony, Raoul suddenly appears alive at the church and his presence interrupts the proceedings. Raoul has brought back a pet dog and a tamed bear cub with him from his sojourn, both animals having become very attached to him. Raoul talks Nanette into eloping with him and his two pets, but Buck and his henchmen attack Raoul. In the ensuing battle, Raoul accidentally kills a man in self-defense but he is arrested for murder anyway, since Buck's father runs the whole town. Raoul is handcuffed and locked up in the basement of a log cabin, with a murder charge hanging over him.

That night, Nanette helps Raoul escape at gunpoint and, after a hasty wedding, the two flee into the wilderness. Corporal O'Connor of the North-West Mounted Police is given the assignment of capturing him, and embarks on what he knows will be a long mission. Three years later, the Mountie, aided by Buck, discovers Raoul's cabin in the North Woods, where Raoul and his wife are raising a baby together. (The dog and the bear still reside with them.) Although he has the impression that Raoul is basically a good man, the Mountie feels he is bound to carry out the law and has no choice but to break up the happy family scene before him.

Just as he arrests Raoul, a massive forest fire breaks out, trapping Nanette, Raoul and their baby in the flames. Cpl. O'Connor, injured by a fallen tree, is rescued by Raoul and the four reach safety, but Buck perishes in the fire when he drunkenly falls into a stupor in an abandoned log cabin. Cpl. O'Connor, feeling a debt of gratitude, agrees to falsely testify to Raoul's death in the fire when he gets back to headquarters, and the Challoner family is allowed to return to their happy life in the North Woods.

== Cast ==
- Betty Blythe as Nanette Roland
- Lon Chaney as Raoul Challoner
- Lewis Stone as Corporal O'Connor
- Francis McDonald as Buck McDougall
- Spottiswoode Aitken as Old Roland
- Melbourne MacDowell as Duncan McDougall
- Charles Smiley as The Parson Beauvais

== Background ==
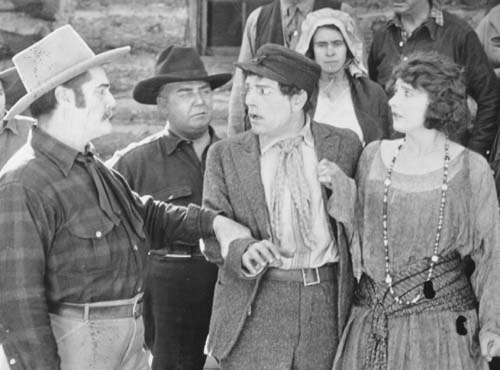
MacDowell, Chaney and Blythe

The crew erected a phony forest on the Universal Studios lot, with fake trees, trimmed with natural foliage, planted in the ground, barked, and painted. The forest fire was filmed with 6 cameras. Betty Blythe and Lon Chaney were burned while filming the forest fire scene when a blaze that popped up unexpectedly blocked their escape. They were rescued through a tunnel that had been previously built for just such an occurrence, but filming was stopped for ten days while the actors recovered in a local hospital. Unfortunately their exciting real-life escape was not filmed.

The 1961 Disney production Nikki, Wild Dog of the North (see AFI Catalog of Feature Films, 1961–70; F6.3499) is also based on James Oliver Curwood's novel, but the plots of the two films are not similar. A modern source states that the 1953 Allied Artists film Northern Patrol is also based on Curwood's novel, but, again, its plot does not resemble those of the other two films.

== Reception ==
"You may forget much of this picture, but you will remember for a long, long time the forest fire, the crashing, burning, smoldering trees and the blistering heat of it, which you almost feel...The dramatic burden is carried by Lon Chaney and Betty Blythe, and the humor of it is strengthened by the antics of a pet cub bear and a small dog who have many experiences by flood and fire. A good family picture, this one." ---Photoplay

"In this particular picture, Lon Chaney was less successful than usual. What he lacked was the romantic bearing to capture the heart of a girl like Nanette." ---Variety

"Emphasis on beauty in the Northwoods, a capable cast and generally intelligent direction, cause Nomads of the North... to be valued as good entertainment." ---Moving Picture World

"It's truly an audience picture, for it holds the attention all the way through and at the end leaves you thoroughly satisfied and thrilled by its gripping climax. Lon Chaney and Lewis S. Stone do very well." ---Wid's Film Daily
