= A Branded Soul =

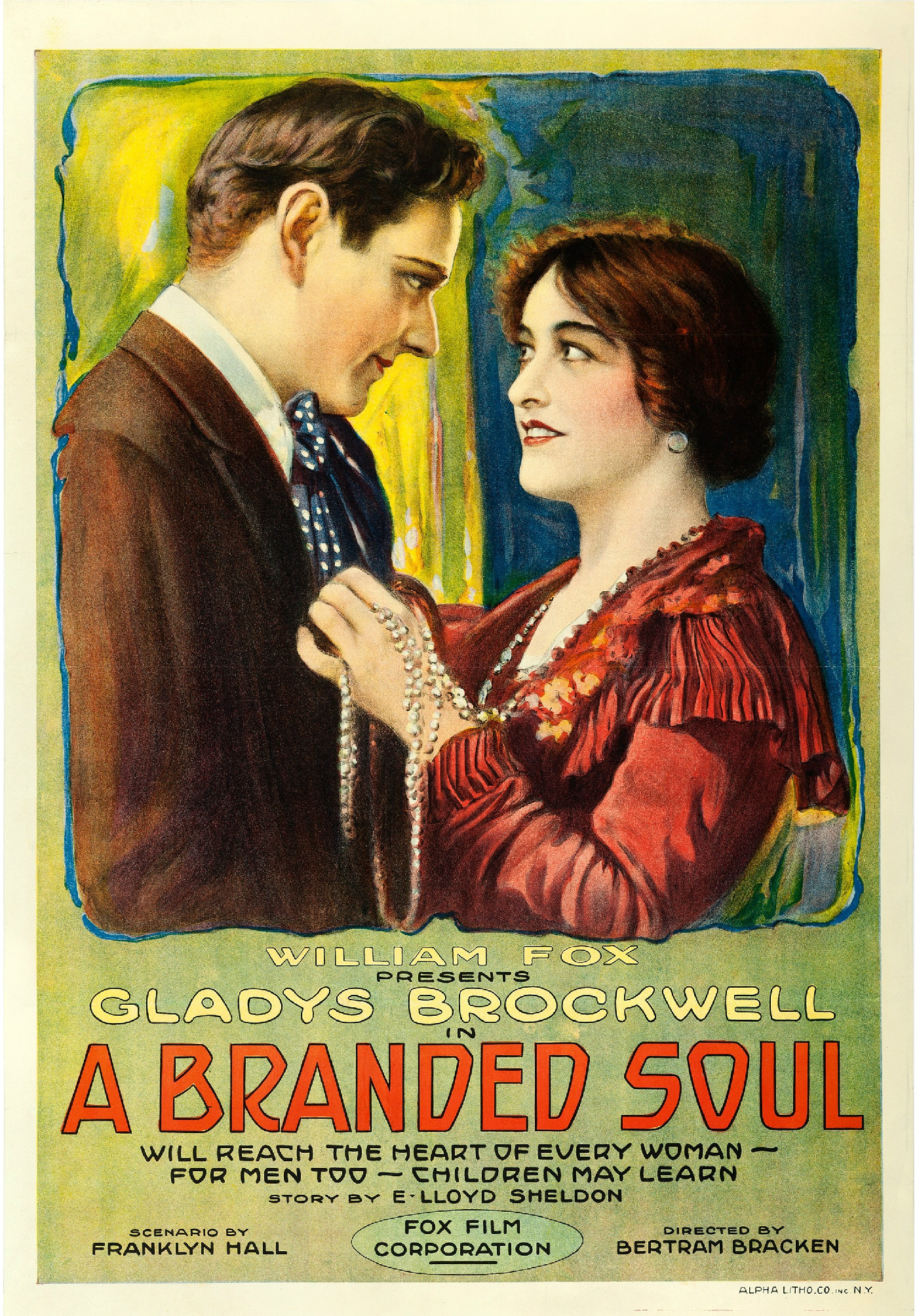
- Theatrical poster
- Directed by: Bertram Bracken
- Written by: Franklyn Hall; Bertram Bracken
- Story by: E. Lloyd Sheldon
- Produced by: William Fox
- Starring: Gladys Brockwell
- Cinematography: Charles Kaufman
- Distributed by: Fox Film Corporation
- Release date: November 25, 1917
- Running time: 5 reels
- Country: United States
- Language: Silent (English intertitles)

A Branded Soul is a lost 1917 American silent drama film directed by Bertram Bracken and starring Gladys Brockwell. It was produced and distributed by the Fox Film Corporation.

== Plot ==
In an opening scene set in ancient Rome, the pagan Valerain makes an attempt to abduct St. Cecilia for his extravagant birthday feast, but her spiritual grace prevents him, leading him to kneel before her.

Conchita Cordova, a singer in the cathedral choir of San Miguelito, has captured the interest of wealthy man John Rannie, whose oil business have displaced local peasants.

Rannie discovers that Conchita's fiancé, Juan Mendoza, has been recruited by Adolf Wylie, a German spy. Conchita finds herself pressured by Rannie, must either submit to his advances or risk exposing her fiancé as a traitor. Despite her reluctance, she chose to save Juan, and in a poignant gesture, she removes her cross, moving Rannie, who then ask for her forgiveness.

Meanwhile, the villagers instigated by Wylie, retaliate by setting fire to Rannie's fields. Misinterpreting Conchita's actions, Juan, thinking she harbors feelings for Rannie, throws her cross into the fire as a symbol of shame, which made her rebuke him. Conchita intervenes to protect Rannie from the villagers' wrath. They went to a church where he kneels beside her in the church. Coincidentally, in Rome, Valerain also kneels before St. Cecilia.

== Cast ==
- Gladys Brockwell as Conchita Cordova
- Colin Chase as Juan Mendoza
- Vivian Rich as Dona Sartoris
- Willard Louis as Pedro
- Lew Cody as John Rannie (credited as Lewis J. Cody)
- Gloria Payton as Dolores Mendoza
- Fred Whitman as Neil Mathews
- Barney Furey as Adolf Wylie
