= The Jungle Goddess =

1922 film

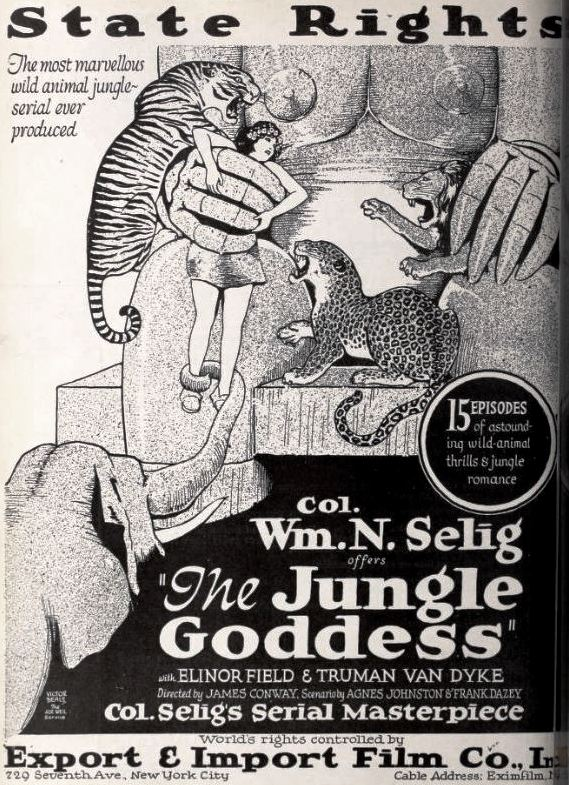
- Advertisement for the film on Exhibitors Herald (December 1921)
- Directed by: James Conway
- Written by: Frank Mitchell Dazey; Agnes Christine Johnston
- Produced by: William Selig (as Col. William Selig)
- Starring: Elinor Field; Truman Van Dyke; Marie Pavis
- Distributed by: William N. Selig Productions; Warner Bros.
- Release date: May 15, 1922
- Running time: 15 episodes
- Country: United States
- Language: Silent (English intertitles)

The Jungle Goddess is a 1922 American adventure film serial directed by James Conway, in 15 chapters, starring Elinor Field, Truman Van Dyke, and Marie Pavis. A co-production by William N. Selig Productions and Warner Bros., it was distributed by the Export & Import Film Company, and ran in U.S. theaters between May 15 and August 21, 1922.

This serial is considered lost.

== Synopsis ==
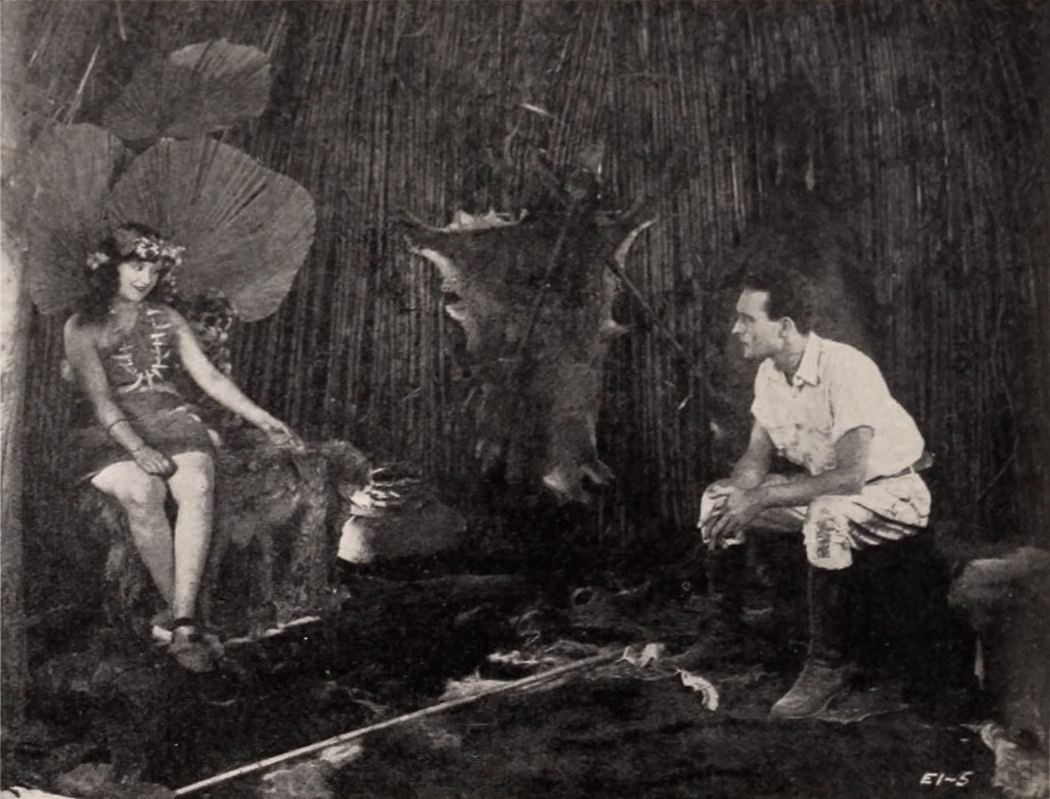
Elinor Field and Truman Van Dyke in a still from the film

A young girl is kidnapped and put in the basket of a hot air balloon. The balloon is accidentally cut loose and drifts into the middle of the African jungle. The young girl is captured by a tribe of cannibals, who transform her into the tribe's goddess. Years later, a young man who had been her childhood friend organizes a jungle expedition to find and save her.

== Cast ==
- Elinor Field as Betty Castleton / "Jungle Goddess"
- Truman Van Dyke as Ralph Dean
- Marie Pavis as Betty's Mother
- L. M. Wells as Dr. James Scranton
- Lafe McKee as Chief Obar Sen
- Vonda Phelps as Betty as a Little Girl
- Olin Francis as High Priest
- William Pratt as Constable
- George Reed as Native guide

== Chapter titles ==
1. Sacrificed to the Lions
2. The City of Blind Waters
3. Saved by the Great Ape
4. The Hell-Ship
5. Wild Beasts in Command
6. Sky High with a Leopard
7. The Rajah's Revenge
8. The Alligator's Victim
9. At Grips with Death
10. The Leopard Woman
11. Soul of Buddha
12. Jaws of Death
13. Cave of Beasts
14. Jungle Terrors
15. The Mad Lion

== Release ==
The film was given an international release, being released in Brazil under the title A Deusa do Sertão ("The Goddess of the Sertão").

== Reception ==
The film serial received generally good reviews, with reviews in film magazines describing The Jungle Goddess as being more "elaborate" and "thrilling" with its "unadulterated action."
