= The Romance Promoters =

1920 silent film

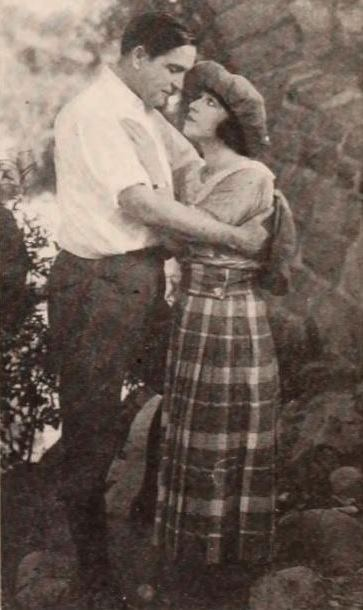
- Directed by: Chester Bennett
- Written by: L.H. Robbins; Harvey F. Thew
- Starring: Earle Williams; Helen Ferguson; Charles Wingate
- Cinematography: Jack MacKenzie
- Production company: Vitagraph Company of America
- Distributed by: Vitagraph Company of America
- Release date: December 1920
- Running time: 50 minutes
- Country: United States
- Languages: Silent; English intertitles

The Romance Promoters is a 1920 American silent comedy-drama film directed by Chester Bennett and starring Earle Williams, Helen Ferguson and Charles Wingate.

== Cast ==
- Earle Williams as Captain Todd, D.S.O. / Todfield King
- Helen Ferguson as Betty Lorris
- Charles Wingate as Quentard Lorris
- Tom McGuire as Jason Downer
- Jack Mathis as Simon Slane
- Ernest Pasque as Count Carlos Vorilla
- J. Parker McConnell as Harry Winthrop
- Mary Huntress as Miss Marks

== Bibliography ==
- Rainey, Buck. Sweethearts of the Sage: Biographies and Filmographies of 258 actresses appearing in Western movies. McFarland & Company, 1992.
