= Youth and Adventure =

1922 American silent film by James W. Horne

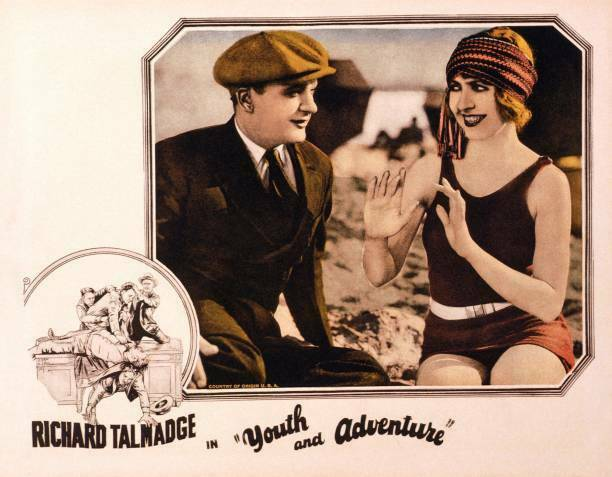
- Lobby card
- Directed by: James W. Horne
- Written by: Frank Howard Clark
- Produced by: Richard Talmadge
- Starring: Richard Talmadge; Margaret Landis; Joseph W. Girard
- Cinematography: William Marshall
- Edited by: Doane Harrison
- Production companies: Richard Talmadge Productions; Truart Film Corporation
- Distributed by: Film Booking Offices of America
- Release date: January 4, 1925
- Running time: 60 minutes
- Country: United States
- Language: Silent (English intertitles)

Youth and Adventure is a 1925 American silent comedy film directed by James W. Horne and starring Richard Talmadge, Margaret Landis, and Joseph W. Girard.

== Plot ==
As described in a review in a film magazine, having squandered a million dollars, with a few thousand left, and after being upbraided by his attorney, Reggie (Talmadge) bets that he can earn his own living and support himself for six months. He tries various jobs, unsuccessfully becoming a book agent, motorcycle cop, and trying some other jobs. He tries to give up but his attorney tells him that his remaining funds were lost in a bad investment. Seeing the political boss Clint Taggart (Girard) with a young chorus singer, Reggie snaps his photograph which is later published in a rival newspaper. To silence Reggie, Taggart makes him manager of one of his own newspapers. Taggert soon finds that he cannot hold Reggie down. Reggie becomes interested in Mary Ryan (Landis), Taggart's stenographer, and they discover with the aid of a dictograph that Taggart is mixed up in bootlegging. While Mary gets the police, Reggie fights Taggart's rough gang single-handedly, even following in a boat when they attempt a getaway. Taggart is finally arrested. Reggie wins Mary's affection and his attorney tells him that his investment has not lost his money but doubled it.

== Cast ==
- Richard Talmadge as Reggie Dillingham
- Pete Gordon as Joe Potts
- Joseph W. Girard as Clint Taggart
- Margaret Landis as Mary Ryan
- Fred Kelsey as Red Mullin
- Katharine Lewis as Phyllis

== Production ==
Besides starring in the film, Talmadge produced the film and conceived and performed the film's many stunts.

== Preservation ==
Prints of Youth and Adventure are in the collections of Gosfilmofond and Cineteca Italiana.

== Bibliography ==
- Munden, Kenneth White. The American Film Institute Catalog of Motion Pictures Produced in the United States, Part 1. University of California Press, 1997.
