= Ernest Shields =

American actor

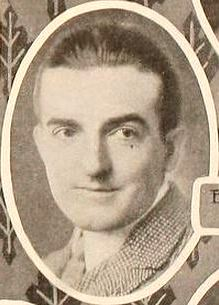
- Detail from an ad for The Silent Avenger (1920)
- Born: August 5, 1884; Chicago, Illinois, US
- Died: December 13, 1944 (aged 60); Los Angeles, California, US
- Occupation: Actor
- Years active: 1914–1944
- Spouse: Betty Schade

Ernest Shields (August 5, 1884 – December 13, 1944) was an American actor of the silent era. He appeared in more than 110 films between 1914 and 1944. He was born in Chicago, Illinois and died in Los Angeles, California.

== Selected filmography ==
- Lucille Love, Girl of Mystery (1914)
- The Broken Coin (1915)
- Behind the Lines (1916)
- It Can't Be True! (1916)
- The Voice on the Wire (1917)
- Mr. Dolan of New York (1917)
- The Reed Case (1917)
- The Birth of Patriotism (1917)
- The Double Room Mystery (1917)
- The Little Orphan (1917)
- The Purple Cipher (1920)
- Colleen of the Pines (1922)
- The Purple Riders (1922)
- The Ladder Jinx (1922)
- Rich But Honest (1927)
- Free Lips (1928)
- Woman Wise (1928)
- The Greyhound Limited (1929)
- Wives Never Know (1936)
