= Chester Bennett =

American film director (1892–1943)

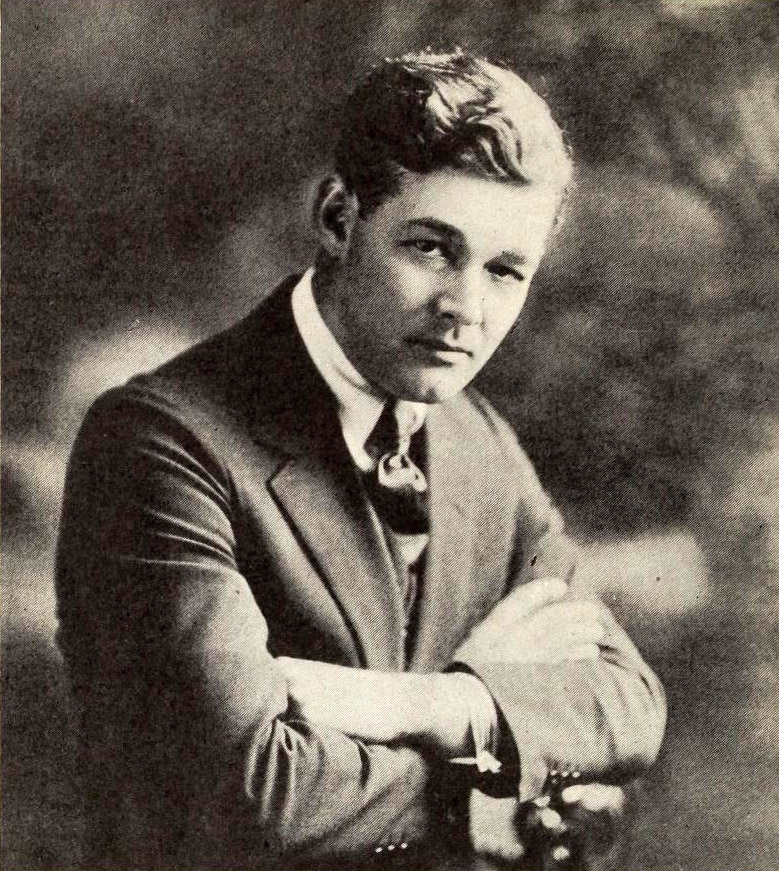
- Bennett in 1921
- Born: February 12, 1892; San Francisco, California, US
- Died: October 29, 1943 (aged 51); Hong Kong

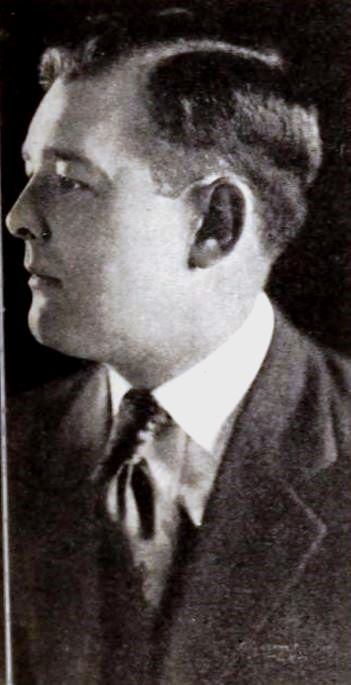
Chester Bennett in 1920 EH

Chester Bennett (1892 - 1943) was an American silent film director. He was executed by the Japanese during the Occupation of Hong Kong in 1943.

== Filmography ==
- When a Man Loves (1919)
- Captain Swift (1920)
- The Purple Cipher (1920)
- A Master Stroke (1920)
- The Romance Promoters (1920)
- Three Sevens (1921)
- The Secret of the Hills (1921)
- Diamonds Adrift (1921)
- Belle of Alaska (1922)
- Colleen of the Pines (1922)
- The Snowshoe Trail (1922)
- Thelma (1922)
- Divorce (1923)
- The Lullaby (1924)
- The Painted Lady (1924)
- Champion of Lost Causes (1925)
- The Ancient Mariner (1925)
- Honesty – The Best Policy (1926)
