= Kazan (1921 film) =

1921 film

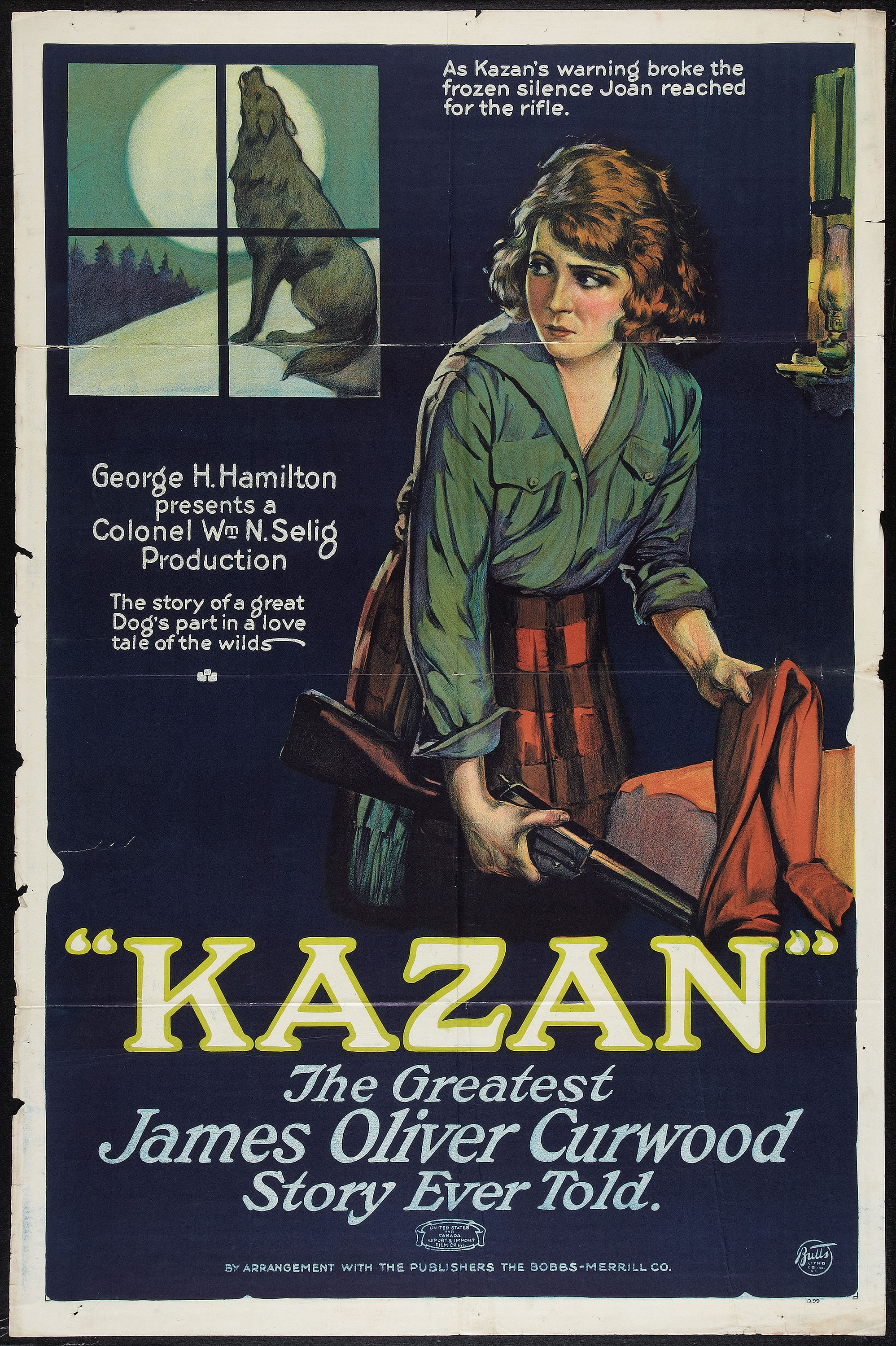
- lobby poster
- Directed by: Bertram Bracken
- Based on: novel by James Oliver Curwood
- Produced by: William N. Selig Productions
- Starring: Jane Novak; Ben Deeley
- Cinematography: Eddie Linden; Eddie Beesley
- Distributed by: Export & Import Film Company
- Release date: October 28, 1921
- Running time: 6 reels
- Country: United States
- Languages: Silent; English intertitles

Kazan is a 1921 American silent Western film. Now lost, it was directed by Bertram Bracken and starring Jane Novak and Ben Deeley. It was produced by William N. Selig and distributed independently. The picture was based upon a novel by James Oliver Curwood. In 1949 it was remade as a sound film of the same title.

== Cast ==
- Jane Novak as Joan Radison
- Ben Deeley as Jim Thorpe
- William Ryno as Pierre Radisson
- Ben Hagerty as Frank Radisson
- Edwin Wallock as Black McCready
