= Trigger Fingers (1924 film) =

1924 film

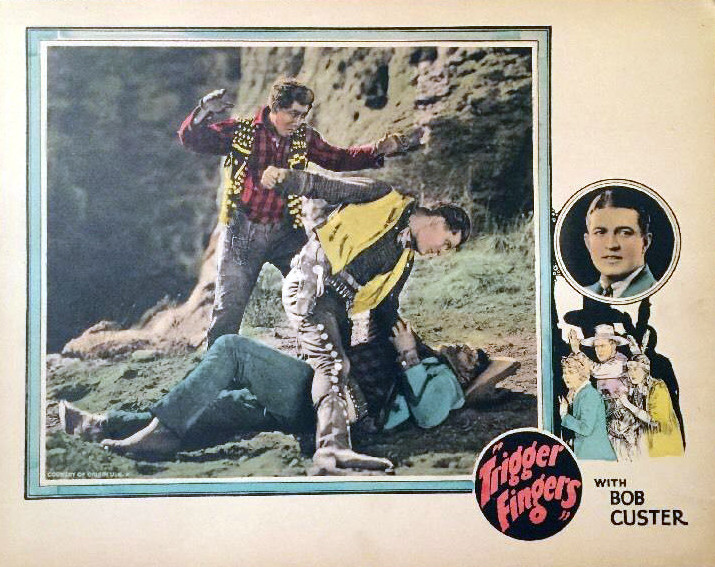
- Lobby card
- Directed by: B. Reeves Eason
- Written by: William Berke
- Produced by: Jesse J. Goldburg
- Starring: Bob Custer; George Field; Margaret Landis
- Cinematography: Walter L. Griffin
- Production company: Independent Pictures
- Distributed by: Film Booking Offices of America
- Release date: November 1924
- Running time: 50 minutes
- Country: United States
- Languages: Silent; English intertitles

Trigger Fingers is a 1924 American silent Western film directed by B. Reeves Eason and starring Bob Custer, George Field, and Margaret Landis.

== Plot ==
As described in a review in a film magazine, in order to better be able to run down a notorious bandit, “The Black Hawk,” Sgt. Steele (Custer) of the Rangers, who has captured another bandit, “Lightning” Brady, impersonates him and joins the gang of unsavory characters led by Murtison (Bennett). Soon he finds The Black Hawk has attacked an official of the mining company and paralyzed his sense of speech. He sends for Dr. Deering (Field), who arrives with his daughter, Ruth (Landis), but returns for instruments and fails to come back. Instead, Murtison’s gang attacks Steele and, in the rumpus, Murtison is killed by The Black Hawk. The gang captures Ruth and a young Indian woman, Wetona (La Rue), and takes them away. Steele rescues them and returns to the shack to find The Black Hawk bending over the patient, who has recovered his speech. Steele forces him to unmask and finds he is Dr. Deering. During a terrific fight, Deering is shot by Wetona. Ruth is shocked to find her father is a bandit, but finds consolation in the love of Steele, who reveals his real identity to her.

== Cast ==
- Bob Custer as Sgt. Bob Steele, posing as Lightning Brady
- George Field as Dr. Deering, aka The Black Hawk
- Margaret Landis as Ruth Deering
- William J. Dyer as Sheriff Mackhart
- Max Asher as Mackhart's Deputy
- Joseph Bennett as Bob Murtison
- Fontaine La Rue as Wetona
- Steve Clemente as Mexican Henchman

== Preservation ==
With no prints of Trigger Fingers located in any film archives, it is a lost film.

== Bibliography ==
- Rainey, Buck. The Strong, Silent Type: Over 100 Screen Cowboys, 1903-1930. McFarland, 2004.
