= Ernest Palmer (American cinematographer) =

American cinematographer (1885–1978)

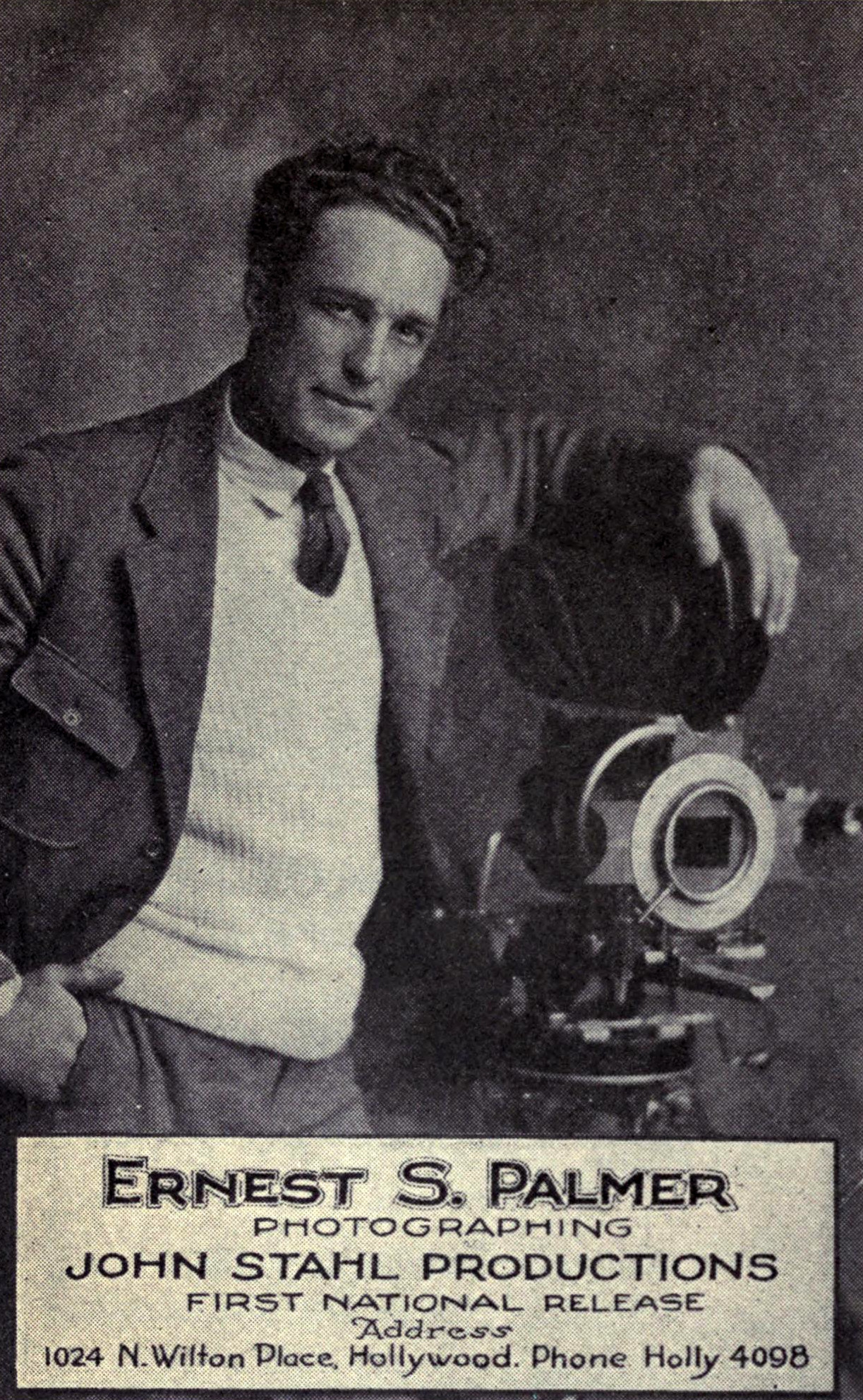
- Possible picture of Ernest Palmer, taken around 1921, although the middle initial is wrong
- Born: Ernest George Palmer; December 6, 1885; Kansas City, Missouri, U.S.
- Died: February 22, 1978 (aged 92); Pacific Palisades, California, U.S.
- Occupation: Hollywood cinematographer
- Known for: Academy Award for Best Cinematography

Ernest George Palmer (December 6, 1885 – February 22, 1978) was a Hollywood cinematographer for more than 160 films. His earliest known credit was for a 1912 adaptation of Ivanhoe.

== Biography ==
Palmer was born in Kansas City, Missouri. In 1941, he won an Oscar for Best Cinematography (in collaboration with Ray Rennahan) for Blood and Sand. Palmer was nominated on several other occasions—in 1928 for Four Devils, in 1929 for Street Angel, and in 1950 for Broken Arrow.

Palmer died in Pacific Palisades, California. He is sometimes confused with a British cinematographer of the same name (1901–1964) who worked on various UK films and television programmes until the early 1960s.

== Selected filmography ==
- The Miracle Man (1919)
- Prisoners of Love (1921)
- Ladies Must Live (1921)
- Always the Woman (1922)
- One Clear Call (1922)
- The Song of Life (1922)
- The Dancers (1925)
- Wages for Wives (1925)
- Fine Clothes (1925)
- Champion of Lost Causes (1925)
- Honesty – The Best Policy (1926)
- Early to Wed (1926)
- Seventh Heaven (1927)
- Street Angel (1928)
- No Other Woman (1928)
- Four Devils (1928)
- Women Everywhere (1930)
- Six Cylinder Love (1931)
- Cavalcade (1933)
- The Great Hotel Murder (1935)
- Gentle Julia (1936)
- Flying Fifty-Five (1939)
- Public Deb No. 1 (1940)
- Chad Hanna (1940)
- Blood and Sand (1941)
- Sweet Rosie O'Grady (1943)
- Three Little Girls in Blue (1946)
- Broken Arrow (1950)
