= Passion's Pathway =

1924 film

- Directed by: Bertram Bracken
- Starring: Estelle Taylor; Wilfred Lucas; Tully Marshall
- Cinematography: Ross Fisher
- Production companies: Jean Perry & Edward Small Company
- Distributed by: Lee-Bradford Corporation
- Release date: August 1, 1924
- Running time: 60 minutes
- Country: United States
- Languages: Silent; English intertitles

Passion's Pathway is a 1924 American silent drama film directed by Bertram Bracken and starring Estelle Taylor, Wilfred Lucas and Tully Marshall.

== Synopsis ==
After bravely defending a Mexican mine from a sabotage attack, Hugh Kenyon finds himself fired by his employer on a trumped-up charge. Driven to desperation, he arms himself and heads to the mansion of his former boss demanding redress.

== Cast ==
- Estelle Taylor as Dora Kenyon
- Jean Perry as Hugh Kenyon
- Wilfred Lucas as Richard Stanton
- Tully Marshall as Butler
- Snitz Edwards as Simpson
- Kate Price as Landlady
- Edward Kimball as John Deering
- Fred DeSilva as General 'Scorpio'
- Kenneth Gibson as Atherton's Son
- Ben Deeley as Howard Atherton
- Margaret Landis

== Bibliography ==
- Connelly, Robert B. The Silents: Silent Feature Films, 1910-36, Volume 40, Issue 2. December Press, 1998.
- Munden, Kenneth White. The American Film Institute Catalog of Motion Pictures Produced in the United States, Part 1. University of California Press, 1997.
