= The Red Warning =

1923 film

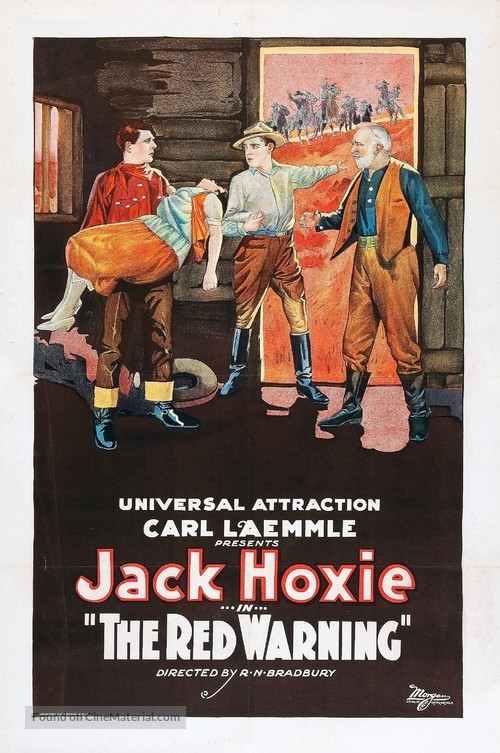
- Film poster
- Directed by: Robert N. Bradbury
- Written by: Isadore Bernstein
- Produced by: Carl Laemmle
- Starring: Jack Hoxie; Fred Kohler; Elinor Field
- Cinematography: William Nobles
- Production company: Universal Pictures
- Distributed by: Universal Pictures
- Release date: December 17, 1923
- Running time: 50 minutes
- Country: United States
- Language: Silent (English intertitles)

The Red Warning is a 1923 American silent Western film directed by Robert N. Bradbury and starring Jack Hoxie, Fred Kohler, and Elinor Field.

== Plot ==
As described in a film magazine review, ranchman David Ainslee loses his cattle through bandit raids, searches for a desert mine, and is found wounded and dying by Phil Haver. Phil brings the news to David's daughter Louise. Phil gives the young woman some gold, which he pretends is from the mine. He gathers a vigilante band and captures the cattle thieves, revenging himself on the man who killed Ainslee, and wins the young woman in the process.

== Cast ==
- Jack Hoxie as Philip Haver
- Fred Kohler as Tom Jeffries
- Elinor Field as Louise Ainslee
- Frank Rice as Toby Jones
- Jim Welch as David Ainslee
- William Welsh as George Ainslee
- Ben Corbett as Bud Osman
- Ralph McCullough as Harry Williams
- Al Hoxie as Scout (uncredited)

== Preservation ==
With no prints of The Red Warning located in any film archives, it is a lost film.

== Bibliography ==
- Katchmer, George A. (1991). Eighty Silent Film Stars: Biographies and Filmographies of the Obscure to the Well Known. McFarland. ISBN 0899504949
