= Kazan (1949 film) =

1949 film by Will Jason

- Directed by: Will Jason
- Written by: James Oliver Curwood (novel); Arthur A. Ross
- Produced by: Robert Cohn
- Starring: Stephen Dunne; Lois Maxwell; Joe Sawyer
- Cinematography: Henry Freulich
- Edited by: Richard Fantl
- Production company: Columbia Pictures
- Distributed by: Columbia Pictures
- Release date: July 14, 1949
- Running time: 65 minutes
- Country: United States
- Language: English

Kazan is a 1949 American drama western film directed by Will Jason and starring Stephen Dunne, Lois Maxwell and Joe Sawyer. It is based on a novel by James Oliver Curwood, which had previously been made into a 1921 silent film of the same title.

The film's sets were designed by the art director, Paul Palmentola.

== Cast ==
- Stephen Dunne as Thomas Weyman
- Lois Maxwell as Louise Maitlin
- Joe Sawyer as Sandz Jepson
- Roman Bohnen as Maitlin
- George Cleveland as Trapper
- John Dehner as Henri Le Clerc
- Ray Teal as McCready
- Loren Gage as Bartender
- Zoro the Dog as Kazan

== Bibliography ==
- Goble, Alan. The Complete Index to Literary Sources in Film. Walter de Gruyter, 1999.
