= The Blue Moon (film) =

1920 silent film by George L. Cox

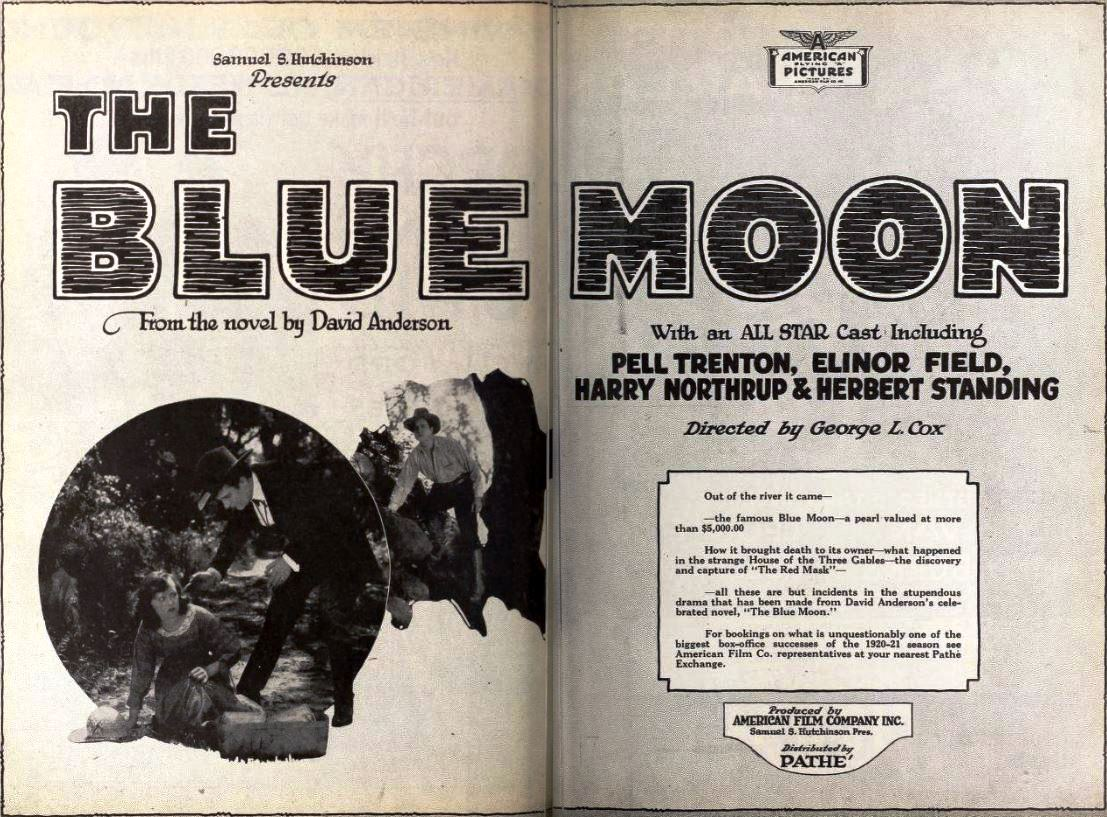
- Directed by: George L. Cox
- Written by: David Anderson (novel); Daniel F. Whitcomb
- Starring: Pell Trenton; Elinor Field; Harry Northrup
- Music by: Henry Purmort Eames
- Production company: American Film Company
- Distributed by: Pathé Exchange
- Release date: November 15, 1920
- Running time: 60 minutes
- Country: United States
- Languages: Silent; English intertitles

The Blue Moon is a 1920 American silent drama film directed by George L. Cox and starring Pell Trenton, Elinor Field, Harry Northrup and Herbert Standing. The film was adapted from the novel by David Anderson.

== Cast ==
- Pell Trenton as The Pearl Hunter
- Elinor Field as Wild Rose
- Harry Northrup as The Man with the Fancy Vest
- James Gordon as The River Boss
- Margaret McWade as The Iron-gray Woman
- Herbert Standing as The Wild Man
- Sidney Franklin as Louie Solomon
- Frederick Monley as The Sheriff
