= Tom McGuire (actor) =

English actor

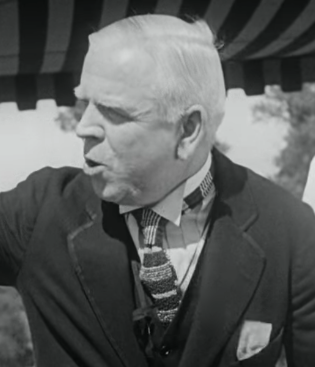
- McGuire in Steamboat Bill, Jr., 1928
- Born: Thomas Maguire; 1 September 1873; Lancashire, England
- Died: 6 May 1954 (aged 80); Hollywood, California, US
- Occupation: Actor
- Years active: 1919–1949

Tom McGuire (1 September 1873 – 6 May 1954) was an English stage and film actor. He appeared in more than 170 films between 1919 and 1949. He was born in Lancashire, England and died in Hollywood, California.

== Selected filmography ==
- The Woman Under Oath (1919)
- The Road of Ambition (1920)
- The Romance Promoters (1920)
- The Girl in the Taxi (1921)
- Cinderella of the Hills (1921)
- See My Lawyer (1921)
- A Front Page Story (1922)
- The Ladder Jinx (1922)
- Single Handed (1923)
- The Self-Made Wife (1923)
- Why Women Remarry (1923)
- The Victor (1923)
- Her Man (1924)
- The Reckless Age (1924)
- Dark Stairways (1924)
- Red Hot Tires (1925)
- Fighting Fate (1925)
- Flaming Waters (1925)
- The Little Giant (1926)
- You'd Be Surprised (1926)
- The Better 'Ole (1926)
- Pleasure Before Business (1927)
- The Missing Link (1927)
- Steamboat Bill, Jr. (1928)
- Voice of the City (1929)
- City Girl (1930)
- Politics (1931)
- Breach of Promise (1932)
- Among the Missing (1934)
- Transatlantic Merry-Go-Round (1934)
