= Bertram Bracken =

American actor

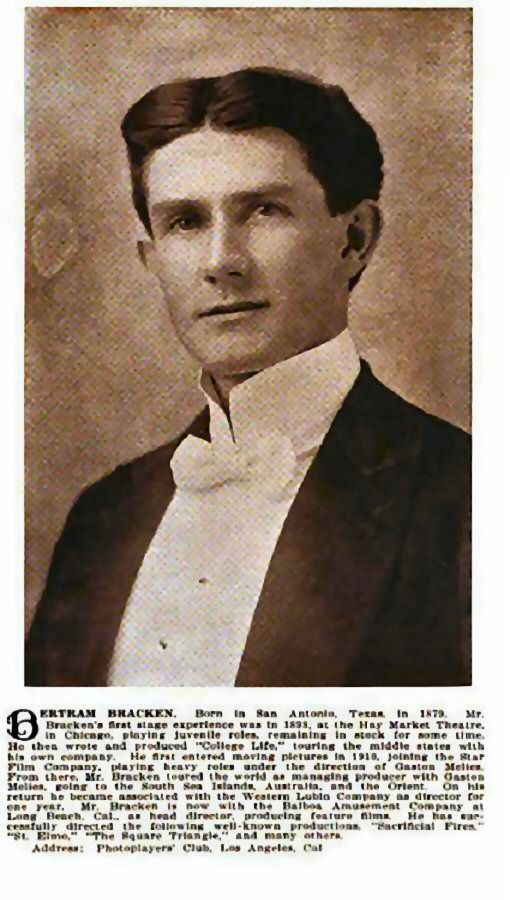
- Who's Who in the Film World, 1914
- Born: August 10, 1879; San Antonio, Texas, U.S.
- Died: November 1, 1952 (aged 73); Los Angeles, California
- Resting place: Welwood Murray Cemetery, Palm Springs, California
- Occupations: Film director, actor, screenwriter
- Years active: 1910–1932

Bertram Bracken (August 10, 1879 – November 1, 1952) was an American silent screen actor, scenarist, and director who worked on at least sixty-five films between 1910 and 1932.

== Biography ==
Bertram “Bert” Bracken was born in San Antonio, Texas, on August 10, 1879, and was raised in Lampasas, Texas, where his parents, Charles and Betty Bracken, operated a grocery store. According to his studio biography Bracken as a young man attended Yale University, worked in banking and served for a year and a half with the 15th U.S. Cavalry. His acting career began in the late 1890s at Chicago's Haymarket theatre and continued on the road with his own stock company performing the play College Life which he wrote and produced.

Bracken entered film in 1910 with the Star Film Company often playing heavies under the direction of Gaston Méliès. Bracken later worked as Méliès’ managing producer while filming in Australia, Asia and the South Pacific.

Soon after his return to America Bracken became a film director with the Western Lubin Company and later head director and producer of feature films at the Balboa Amusement Producing Company.

Bertram would go on to work for the Fox Film Corporation where he directed such stars as Theda Bara and Anita Stewart. Trouble with his vision interrupted his career in the early twenties though he eventually returned to work for several more years. His last film, The Face on the Barroom Floor, that he co-wrote and directed, was released in 1932.

Bracken's wife, actress Margaret Landis, played leading and supporting roles in a number of his films before they divorced in the early 1920s.

In later life Bracken wrote mystery novels and scripts for radio shows.

Bertram Bracken died in Los Angeles on November 1, 1952. and was interred at the Welwood Murray Cemetery in Palm Springs.

== Partial filmography ==
- St. Elmo (1914)
- The Eternal Sapho (1916)
- East Lynne (1916)
- A Branded Soul (1917)
- The Primitive Call (1917)
- Conscience (1917) starring Gladys Brockwell
- The Moral Law (1918)
- The Boomerang (1919)
- The Confession (1920)
- Parted Curtains (1920)
- Harriet and the Piper (1920)
- The Mask (1921)
- The Policeman and the Baby (1921)
- Kazan (1921)
- Defying the Law (1924)
- Passion's Pathway (1924)
- Heartless Husbands (1925)
- Dame Chance (1926)
- Fire and Steel (1927)
- Duty's Reward (1927)
- Rose of the Bowery (1927)
- The Face on the Barroom Floor (1932)
