= God's Great Wilderness =

1927 film

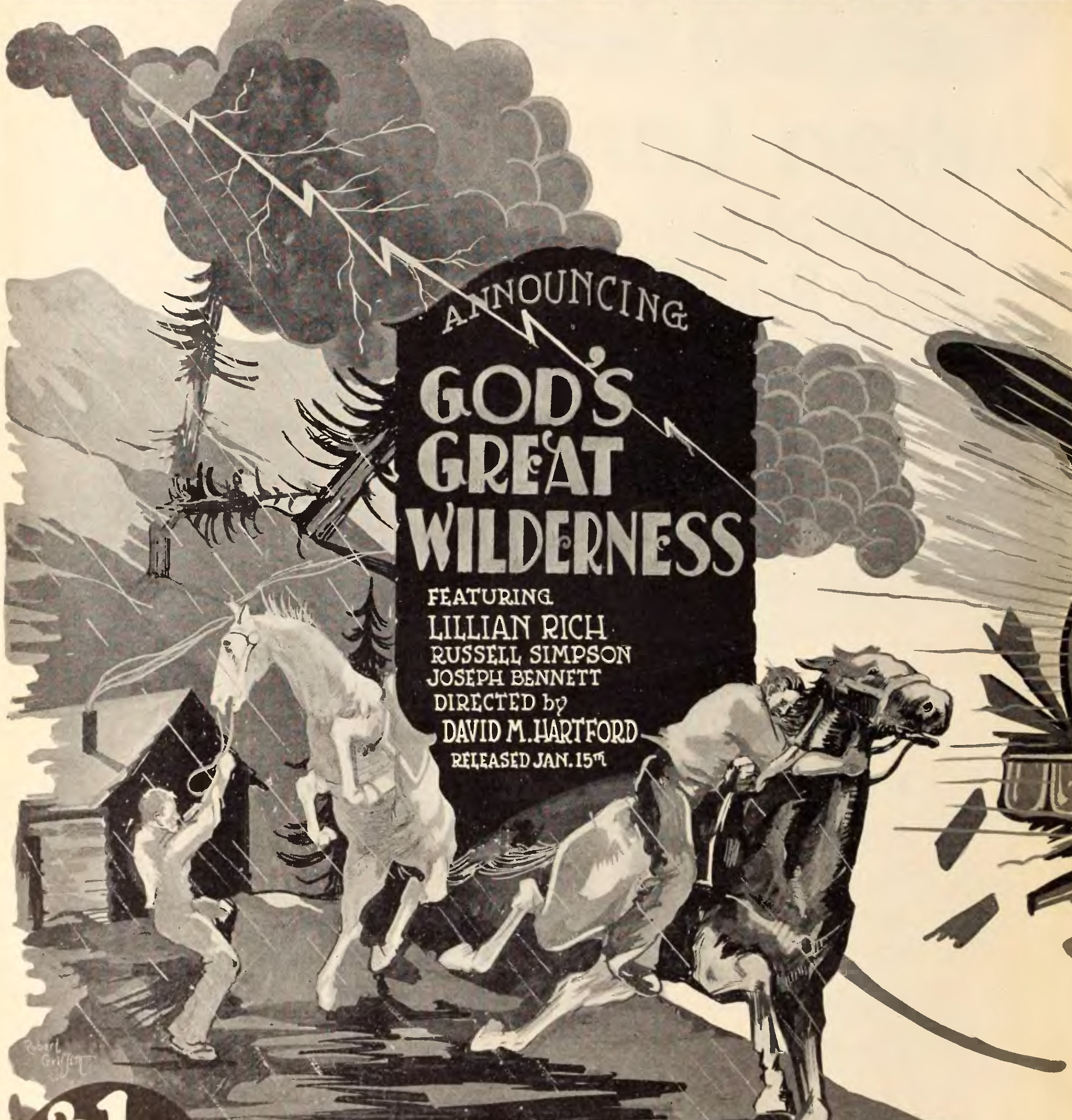
- Directed by: David Hartford
- Written by: Spottiswoode Aitken; Frances Nordstrom
- Produced by: David Hartford
- Starring: Lillian Rich; Joseph Bennett; Russell Simpson
- Cinematography: Walter L. Griffin
- Edited by: Walter L. Griffin
- Production company: David Hartford Productions
- Distributed by: American Cinema Association
- Release date: March 8, 1927
- Running time: 60 minutes
- Country: United States
- Languages: Silent; English intertitles

God's Great Wilderness is a 1927 American silent northern drama film directed by David Hartford and starring Lillian Rich, Joseph Bennett and Russell Simpson.

== Plot ==
Amongst lumber workers, a new family arrive and clash with one of the older settlers.

== Cast ==
- Lillian Rich as Mary Goodheart
- Joseph Bennett as Dick Stoner
- Russell Simpson as Richard Stoner
- Mary Carr as Emma Stoner
- John Steppling as Noah Goodheart
- Rose Tapley as Susan Goodheart
- Edward Coxen as Paul Goodheart
- Tom Bates as Peter Marks
- Wilbur Higby as Ward Maxwell
- Roy Laidlaw as Circuit Rider

== Preservation ==
This film is now lost.

== Bibliography ==
- Connelly, Robert B. The Silents: Silent Feature Films, 1910-36, Volume 40, Issue 2. December Press, 1998.
- Munden, Kenneth White. The American Film Institute Catalog of Motion Pictures Produced in the United States, Part 1. University of California Press, 1997.
