= Pell Trenton =

American actor

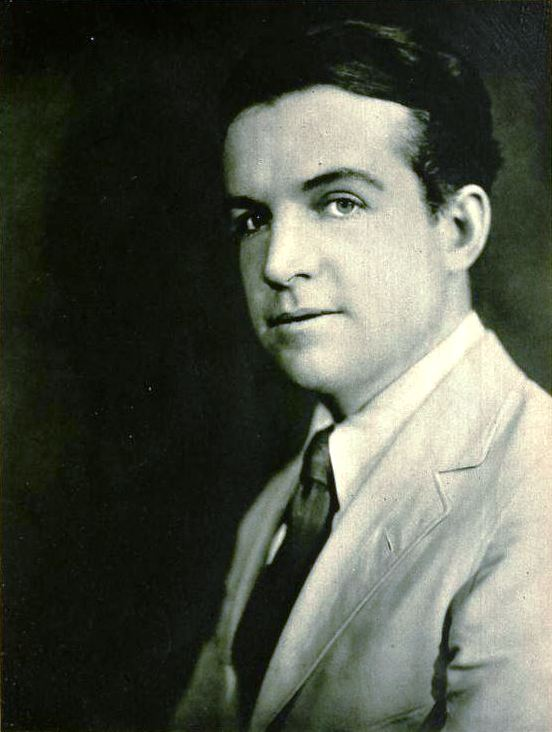
- Trenton in a Motion Picture magazine photo from May 1920
- Born: William T. Baker; August 29, 1883; New York City, U.S.
- Died: March 3, 1924 (aged 40); Los Angeles, California, U.S.
- Occupation: Actor
- Years active: 1912–1922

Pell Trenton (born William T. Baker; August 29, 1883 – March 3, 1924) was an actor in theater and Hollywood films during the silent film era. He was popular and had leading roles.

== Background ==
Pell Trenton was born August 29, 1883, in New York City. He was in theater from 1910 and began in juvenile roles in film. In 1917 he was in Hamilton. A headshot of Trenton is signed by him and Chamberlain Brown "manager".

His career was cut short when he fell ill in 1921 and died on March 3, 1924, in Los Angeles from a pulmonary tuberculosis at the age of 40.

== Filmography ==
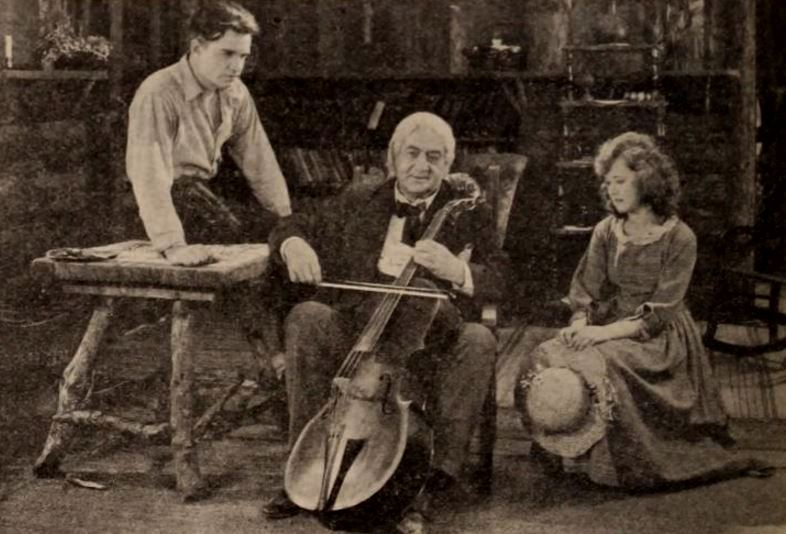
On the left in The Blue Moon

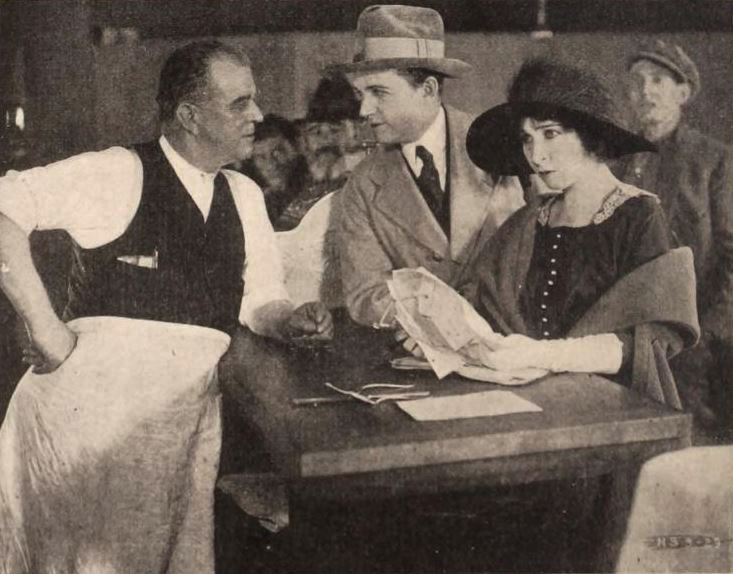
At center in The Greater Profit

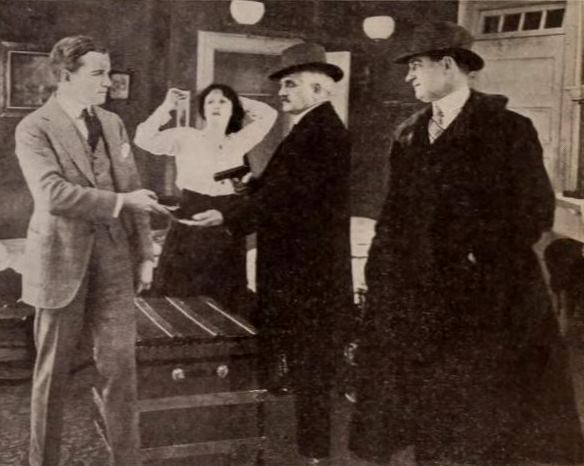
On left in The House of Glass

- The Adventurer (1917 Alice Guy film) (1917)
- Stranded in Arcady (1917)
- House of Glass (1918)
- The Uplifters (1919)
- The Rebellious Bride (1919)
- The False Code (1919)
- The Joyous Liar (1919)
- Fair and Warmer (1919)
- The Willow Tree (1920)
- Beautifully Trimmed (1920)
- The House of Toys (1920)
- The Blue Moon (1920)
- The Greater Profit (1921)
- The New Disciple (1922)
