= Her Man (1924 film) =

1924 film

- Directed by: Alan James
- Produced by: Phil Goldstone
- Starring: William Fairbanks
- Distributed by: Renown Pictures
- Release date: July 20, 1924
- Running time: 5 reels
- Country: United States
- Languages: Silent; English intertitles

Her Man is a 1924 American silent Western film directed by Alan James and starring William Fairbanks and Margaret Landis.

The film is preserved by The Library of Congress.

== Cast ==
- William Fairbanks
- Margaret Landis
- Tom McGuire
- James Pierce
- Frank Whitson
