= Walter L. Griffin =

- Other names: Walter Griffen, W. Griffin, Walter Griffin
- Occupation: Cinematographer
- Title: A.S.C. Founding Member

Walter L. Griffin was a founder of the American Society of Cinematographers. Griffin started working in pictures in 1912 and spent a year and a half in the lab before he first cranked a camera for Universal Pictures. In 1915, he joined the Exposition Players' Corporation, official cinematographers of the Panama–Pacific International Exposition in San Francisco, where he headed photographic and lab operations. When the exposition closed in 1916, he spent four months in Colorado, making scenic films for the Denver Tourist Bureau.

Returning to Hollywood, Griffin signed on with the National Film Corporation, where he shot some 25 comedies featuring National’s owner, William “Smiling Bill” Parsons. His best-remembered film is the Lon Chaney vehicle Nomads of the North (1920), which was filmed for the National Film Corporation but was released through the Associated First National Exhibitors Circuit after Parsons' untimely death caused the NFC to close. Through the early 1920s, Griffin ground out low-budget Westerns starring Bob Custer, Franklyn Farnum and Al Hoxie. In the mid-1920s, he gave up wide-open spaces for the great indoors and shot a number modest melodramas, such as Rose of the Bowery (1927) and The Heart of Broadway (1928). His last known credit as a cinematographer is City of Purple Dreams (1928).

== Cinematographer ==
- The City of Purple Dreams (1928) (as Walter Griffin)
- Sweet Sixteen (1928) (as Walter Griffin)
- The Midnight Adventure (1928) (as Walter Griffin)
- Danger Patrol (1928) (as Walter Griffen)
- The Phantom of the Turf (1928) (as Walter Griffin)
- The Heart of Broadway (1928) (as Walter Griffen)
- Heroes in Blue (1927) (as Walter Griffin)
- The Wheel of Destiny (1927) (as Walter Griffen)
- The Cruise of the Hellion (1927) (as Walter Griffin)
- Romantic Rogue (1927) (as Walter Griffen)
- The Lost Limited (1927) (as Walter Griffin)
- God's Great Wilderness (1927)
- Rose of the Bowery (1927) (as Walter Griffin)
- Perils of the Rail (1926) (as Walter Griffin)
- The Man in the Shadow (1926) (as Walter Griffin)
- Dame Chance (1926) (as Walter Griffin)
- Jack O'Hearts (1926) (as Walter Griffin)
- Then Came the Woman (1926) (as Walter Griffin)
- Border Justice (1925) (as Walter Griffin)
- Cold Nerve (1925) (as Walter Griffin)
- Riding Romance (1925) (as Walter Griffin)
- Barriers of the Law (1925)
- Border Intrigue (1925) (as Walter Griffin)
- Outwitted (1925) (as Walter Griffin)
- Flashing Spurs (1924) (as Walter Griffen)
- Trigger Fingers (1924) (as Walter Griffin)
- Western Vengeance (1924) (as Walter Griffin)
- The Whipping Boss (1924) (as Walter Griffin)
- Blue Water (1924)
- Crossed Trails (1924) (as Walter Griffin)
- Baffled (1924)
- Two Fisted Tenderfoot (1924) (as Walter Griffin)
- A Desperate Adventure (1924) (as Walter Griffin)
- The Silent Partner (1923) (as Walter Griffin)
- A Dangerous Adventure (1922)
- The Rapids (1922)
- The Golden Snare (1921) (as Walter Griffin)
- Hearts and Masks (1921) (as Walter Griffin)
- Nomads of the North (1920)
- Parted Curtains (1920)
- The Confession (1920)
- The Long Arm of Mannister (1919)
- The Boomerang (1919) (as Walter Griffin)
- Modern Husbands (1919) (as Walter Griffin)
- The Long Lane's Turning (1919) (as W. Griffin)
- The Girl of My Dreams (1918)
- The Man of Bronze (1918)
- Inside the Lines (1918)
- The Spotted Lily (1917)
- Story of Jewel City (1915)
