= East Lynne (disambiguation) =

East Lynne may refer to:

Places

- East Lynne, Missouri

Arts and entertainment

- East Lynne, an 1861 novel
- East Lynne (1912 film), starring James Cruze and released by Thanhouser Film Corporation
- East Lynne (1913 film), starring Blanche Forsythe and Fred Paul
- East Lynne (1916 film), starring Theda Bara and one of her few films to survive
- East Lynne (1921 film), starring Edward Earle and Mabel Ballin
- East Lynne (1922 film), an Australian film directed by Charles Hardy
- East Lynne (1925 film) starring Alma Rubens
- East Lynne (1931 film), directed by Frank Lloyd and nominated for an Oscar for Best Picture
- East Lynne (1976 film), directed by Barney Colehan and Philip Grout
- East Lynne (1982 film), a TV film directed by David Green and starring Martin Shaw

== See also ==
- East Lynne on the Western Front, a 1931 comedy film
- East Lyn River, and
- East Lyn Valley, both in Devon
