= The Channings =

The Channings may refer to:

- The Channings (novel), an 1862 novel by Ellen Wood
- The Channings (film), a 1920 British silent crime film, based on the novel

== See also ==
- Channing (disambiguation)
