= East Lynne (1931 film) =

1931 American film

- Directed by: Frank Lloyd
- Written by: Tom Barry; Bradley King
- Based on: East Lynne by Ellen Wood
- Starring: Ann Harding; Conrad Nagel; Clive Brook; Cecilia Loftus
- Cinematography: John F. Seitz
- Edited by: Margaret Clancey
- Music by: Richard Fall; Carli Elinor
- Distributed by: Fox Film Corporation
- Release dates: February 20, 1931 (New York City); March 31, 1931 (U.S.)
- Running time: 102 minutes, 9,188 ft., or 10 reels
- Country: United States
- Language: English

East Lynne is a 1931 American pre-Code film version of Ellen Wood's eponymous 1861 novel, which was adapted by Tom Barry and Bradley King and directed by Frank Lloyd. (The adaptation was sufficiently different from Wood's original novel that the screenplay was in turn novelized for a Grosset and Dunlap Photoplay Edition by Arline de Haas.) The film received an Academy Award nomination for Best Picture but lost to RKO-Radio's Cimarron. East Lynne is a melodrama starring Ann Harding, Clive Brook, Conrad Nagel and Cecilia Loftus.

Only one print of the film is known to exist, though bootleg DVD copies exist minus the final scene. This print is in good shape, although several frames have an "X" on them, indicating they were to be removed in the film editing stage. One frame has a "crosshairs" on it, while several frames have ink marks. People may view the film at University of California Los Angeles's Instructional Media Lab, Powell Library, after arranging an appointment. The film's copyright was renewed, so will not fall into the public domain until 2027.

The film is the third adaptation of the book produced by Fox. Previous versions are the 1916 release with Theda Bara and the one in 1925 starring Alma Rubens.

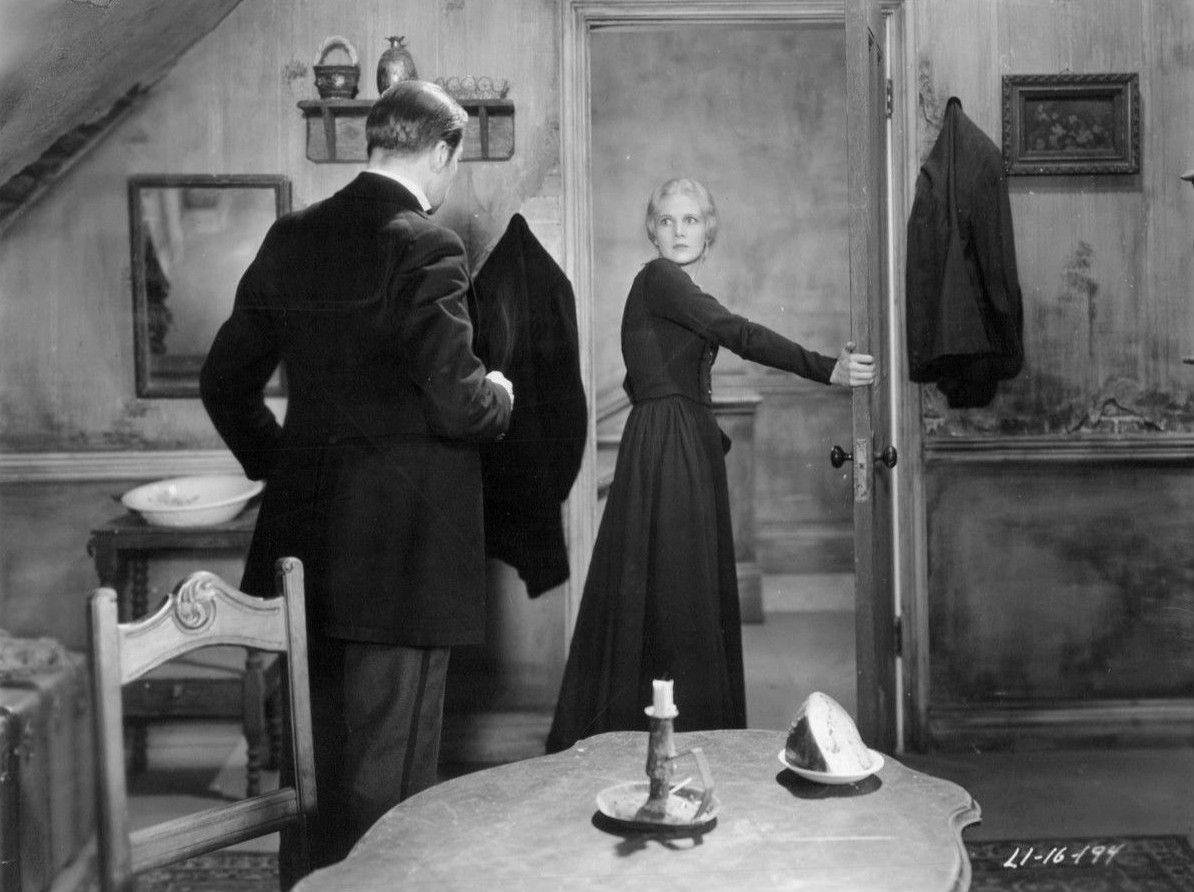
Brook and Harding in a scene from the film.

== Plot ==
Ann Harding plays the role of Lady Isabella, the trophy wife of a stodgy man of wealth yearns for a more interesting life. A daughter of a nobleman, her solution leads to scandal, ruin, and an odd denouement.

== Cast ==
- Ann Harding as Lady Isabella
- Clive Brook as Captain William Levison
- Conrad Nagel as Robert Carlyle (name changed from Archibald Carlyle in the book)
- Cecilia Loftus as Cornelia Carlyle
- Beryl Mercer as Joyce
- O.P. Heggie as Lord Mount Severn
- Flora Sheffield as Barbara Hare
- David Torrence as Sir Richard Hare
- J. Gunnis Davis as Dodson, the Butler (uncredited)
- Eric Mayne as Doctor
- Ronnie Cosby as William as a child
- Wallie Albright as William as a boy

== Awards ==
The film was nominated for an Academy Award for Best Picture in 1931.

== Other filmed versions based on the novel ==
- 1912 East Lynne – short film - directed by Theodore Marston - with Florence La Badie and James Cruze
- 1913 East Lynne - British film - directed by Bert Haldane - with Blanche Forsythe and Fred Paul
- 1915 East Lynne – short film - directed by Travers Vale - with Louise Vale and Alan Hale
- 1916 East Lynne – directed by Bertram Bracken - with Theda Bara and Ben Deeley
- 1921 East Lynne – directed by Hugo Ballin - with Mabel Ballin and Edward Earle
- 1922 East Lynne - Australian film - directed by Charles Hardy - with Ellen Jerdan and Don McAlpine
- 1925 East Lynne – directed by Emmett J. Flynn - with Alma Rubens and Edmund Lowe
- 1930 Ex Flame - directed by Victor Halperin - with Neil Hamilton and Marian Nixon
- 1976 East Lynne – British television series - directed by Barney Colehan - with Polly James and Christopher Cazenove
- 1982 East Lynne – British television film - directed by David Green - with Lisa Eichhorn and Tim Woodward
