= Chann =

Chann may refer to

- Chann McRae (born 1971), American cyclist
- Chann Mahi, a 1956 Pakistani Punjabi film
- Chann Pardesi, a 1981 Indian Punjabi film
- "Chann", a song by Sachin–Jigar and Arijit Singh from the 2026 Indian film Udta Teer

== See also ==
- Channing (disambiguation)
