= John Jellicoe (disambiguation) =

John Jellicoe may refer to:

- John Jellicoe, 1st Earl Jellicoe (1859–1935), Royal Naval Officer who commanded the fleet at the Battle of Jutland
- John Jellicoe (illustrator) (1842–1914), illustrator for both magazines and books
- John Jellico (1856–1925), British Olympic sailor
