= Ripon Millenary Festival =

1886 festival in England

- Date: 25 August – 1 September 1886
- Duration: Five days from Wednesday to Sunday
- Venue: Mainly at Studley Royal Park and Fountains Abbey
- Location: Ripon, North Yorkshire, England; 54.112°N 1.580°W
- Type: Merrie England Pageant
- Theme: The History of Ripon
- Budget: £1,776 1s 11d
- Patron: Lord and Lady Ripon
- Organised by: Ernest Richard D'Arcy Ferris (2 April 1855 – 4 July 1929)
- Participants: The people of Ripon
- Outcome: A Brilliant Success
- The festival celebrated the anniversary of the supposed granting of a royal charter by Alfred the Great to Ripon in 886.

The Ripon Millenary Festival was a pageant and festival held in Ripon over a week in August 1886, with the main activities concentrated on two days, to celebrate the supposed millenary of the granting of a royal charter to Ripon by Alfred the Great. (Note: There was no documentary evidence for this charter other than a single entry in an old calendar that referred to the charter.)

== The background to the festival ==
The late 19th century saw a rise in interest in medieval history, and especially in the rituals of the Middle Ages. The rise of puritanism had led to the end of many medieval feast-days and rituals, but it was the industrial revolution, the cemented their loss, when many other aspects of the Puritan Revolution were reversed.

D'Arcey Ferris, who became the festival organiser was a romantic interested in the revival of such medieval practices as the Yule log and Morris dancing, but this was only a part of the broader interest in the revival of lost traditions. D'Arcy Ferris's motivation was broader than just historical interest, he saw reviving the medieval sports and pastimes as a way to lighten the life of the poor that might even break down class prejudices.

== First steps ==
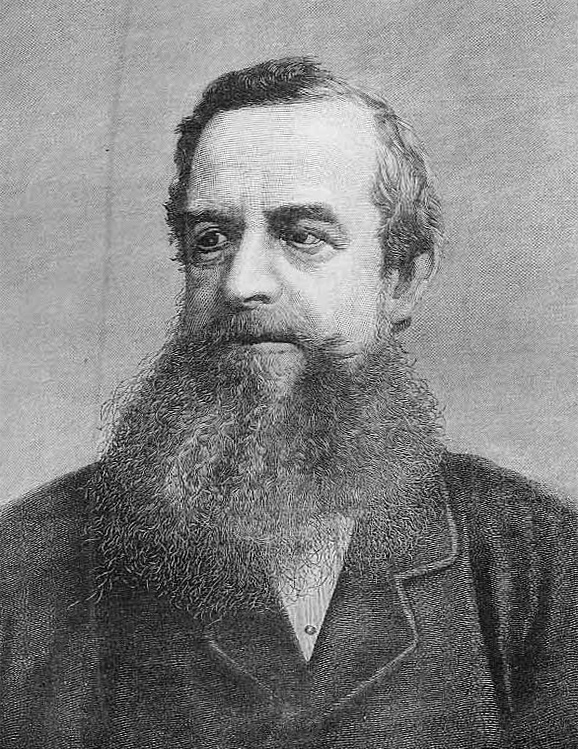
Lord Ripon

On 4 January 1886, the Vicar of Trinity Church asked what the parish of Ripon had to look forward to on the millenary of the granting of a charter of incorporation to Ripon by King Alfred. By 26 February 1886, the Mayor received a request signed by leading figures in the town to convene a public meeting to discuss a celebration of the millenary. A general plan for the celebration was laid out in a statement by the festival committee on 26 March 1886. There was some resistance from the corporation, but a public meeting was held on 12 April 1886. The executive committee of the festival met on 22 April finally settled on the name of the festival. The committee sent a delegation to meet with Lord Ripon who: agreed to allow the use of his grounds; indicated what dates in August would suit him; became with Lady Ripon, a patron of the festival; and became a guarantor for the festival.

In May, Mr D'Arcy Ferris attended the meeting of the festival committee, and gave a detailed statement of how he would carry out the festival. On 19 May 1886, D'Arcy Ferris accepted the post of Master of the Revels for a fee of 30 guineas plus 10% of any profits. Thence forward, planning went on at a frantic pace. In the event, D'Arcy Ferris was paid £68 10s, being his fee of 30 guineas, his profit share, and a gratuity of £15 from a grateful committee.

== St Wilfrid's Day and Millenary Festival Proclamation ==
The feast of St Wilfrid and the usual procession was held on Saturday 31st July 1886 with Mr D'Arcy Ferris being involved with some of the preparations. To advertise the forthcoming Millenary Festival, a proclamation was published.

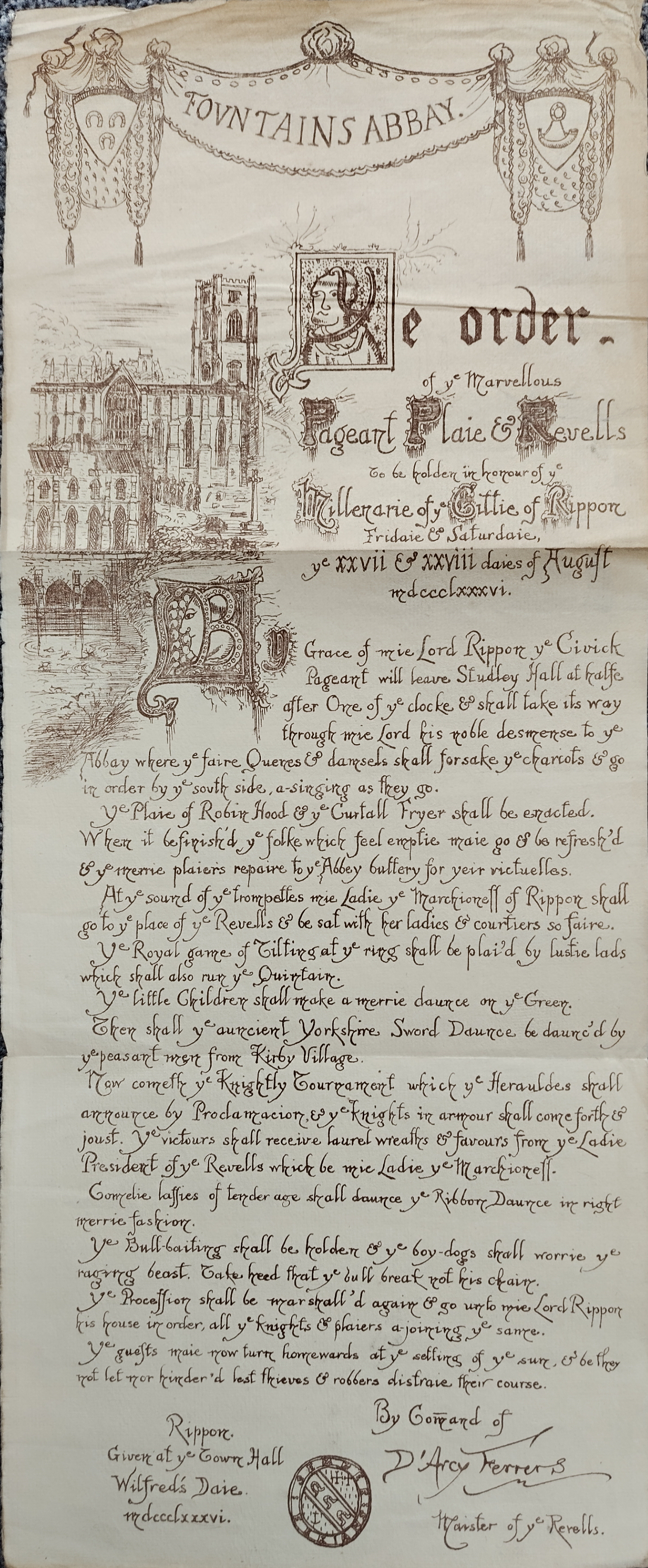
The proclamation by Mr D'Arcy Ferris made on the feast of St Wilfrid

== The festival programme ==
=== Wednesday 25 August ===
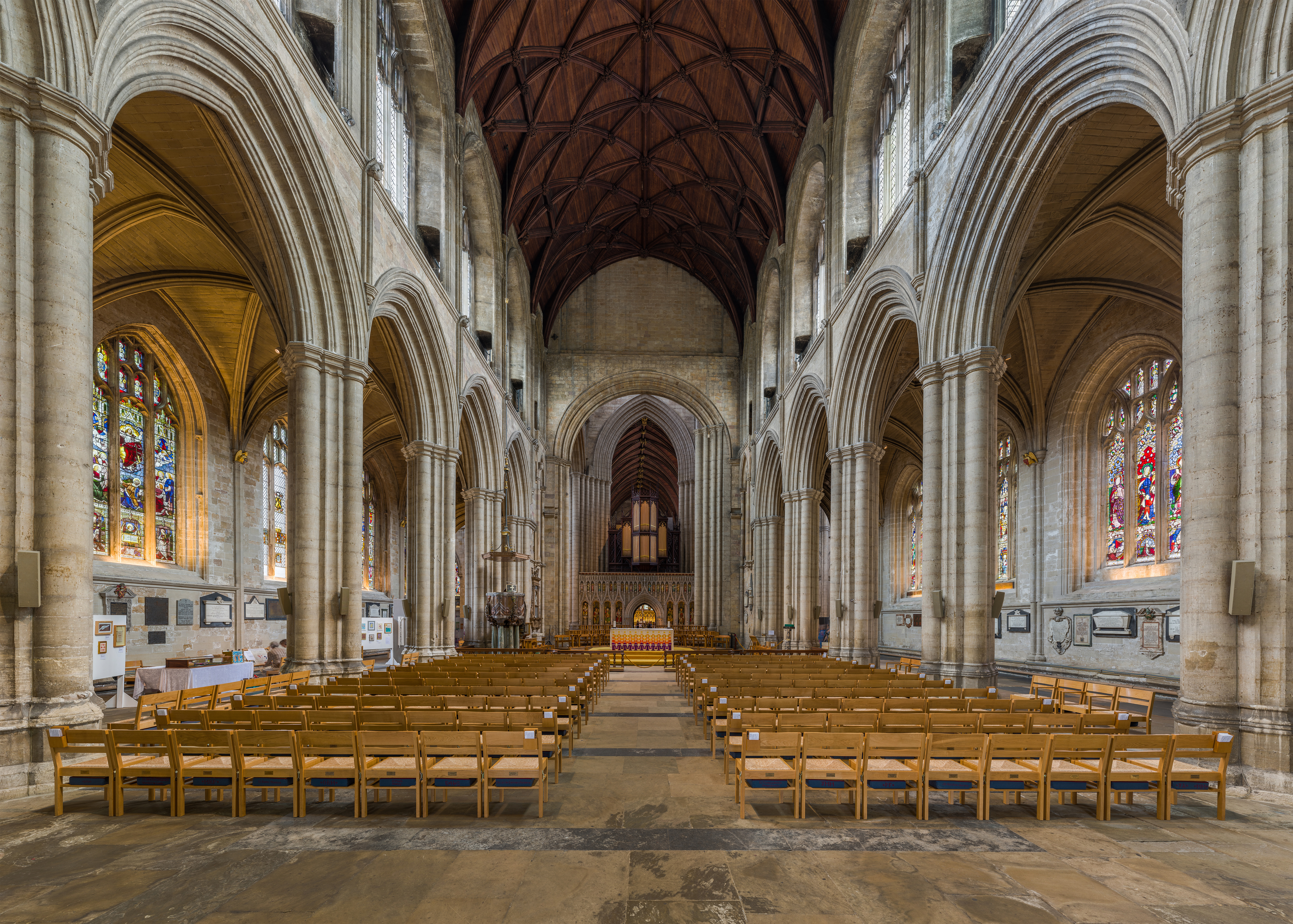
Ripon Cathedral interior

Festival activities began at 5am on Wednesday 25 August 1886 when a team of bell-ringers ascended the cathedral belfry and rang a peal of 5,000 changes for three-and-a-quarter hours. During the morning dignitaries arrived, and there was a formal procession from the town hall to the cathedral. The procession included not only the town dignitaries, two bands, a handful of friendly societies, and religious leaders, but also the mayors of 14 other towns in the region, complete with their mace bearers.

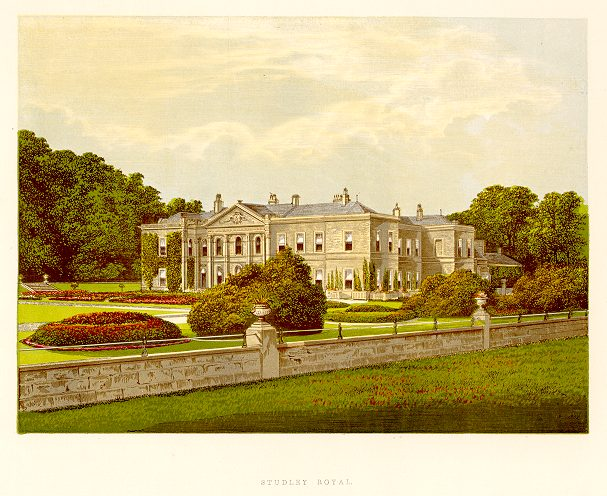
Studley Royal in 1880

The cathedral filled up an hour before the service was due to start. The music was chosen to show the development of church music historically from the 13th century forward, and the Archbishop of York preached a sermon. The service was followed by a luncheon for more than a thousand guests in Victoria Hall, presided over by the mayor of Ripon. The dignitaries then proceeded to the Market Square, where there was a succession of speeches, and the dean of the cathedral presented a horn to the corporation. This was followed by a torchlit procession, with bands, floats and some role-players in period costumes.

=== Thursday 26 August ===
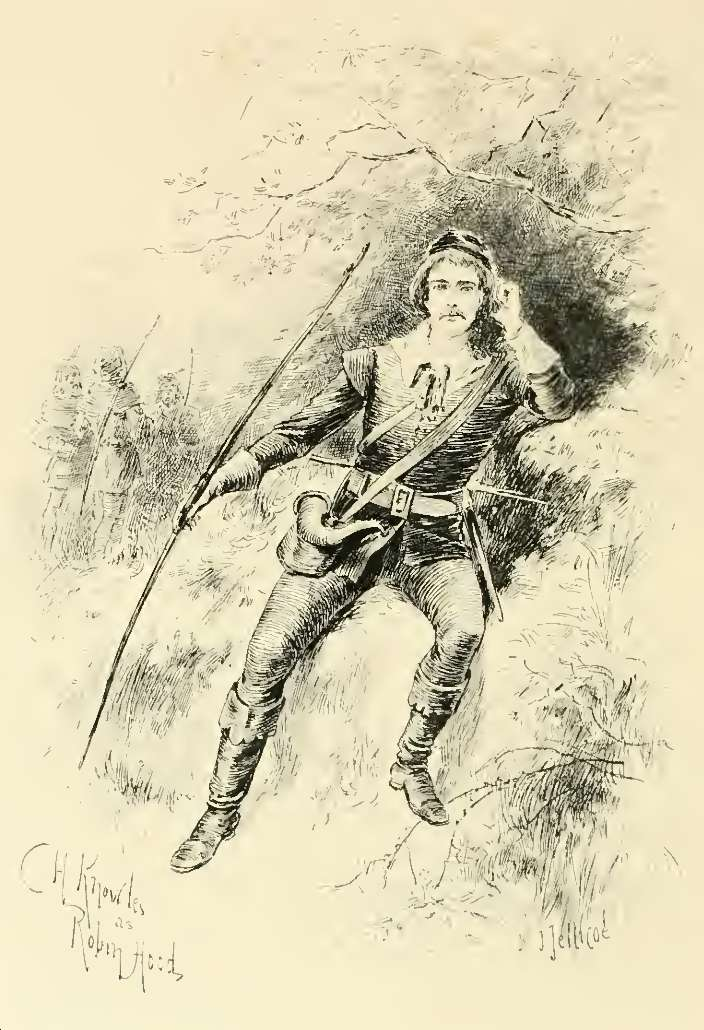
C. H. Knowles as Robin Hood

Thursday was the normal market-day in Ripon, and while the town continued to be decorated, there were no festival events in the town as those playing the roles had to step out of their medieval costume as business must be attended to. However, there was a large crowd at the cathedral for the celebration of the jubilee of the bishopric, (Note: This had only been restored to Ripon in 1836.) and the unveiling of a stained glass window celebrating this.

=== Friday 27 August ===
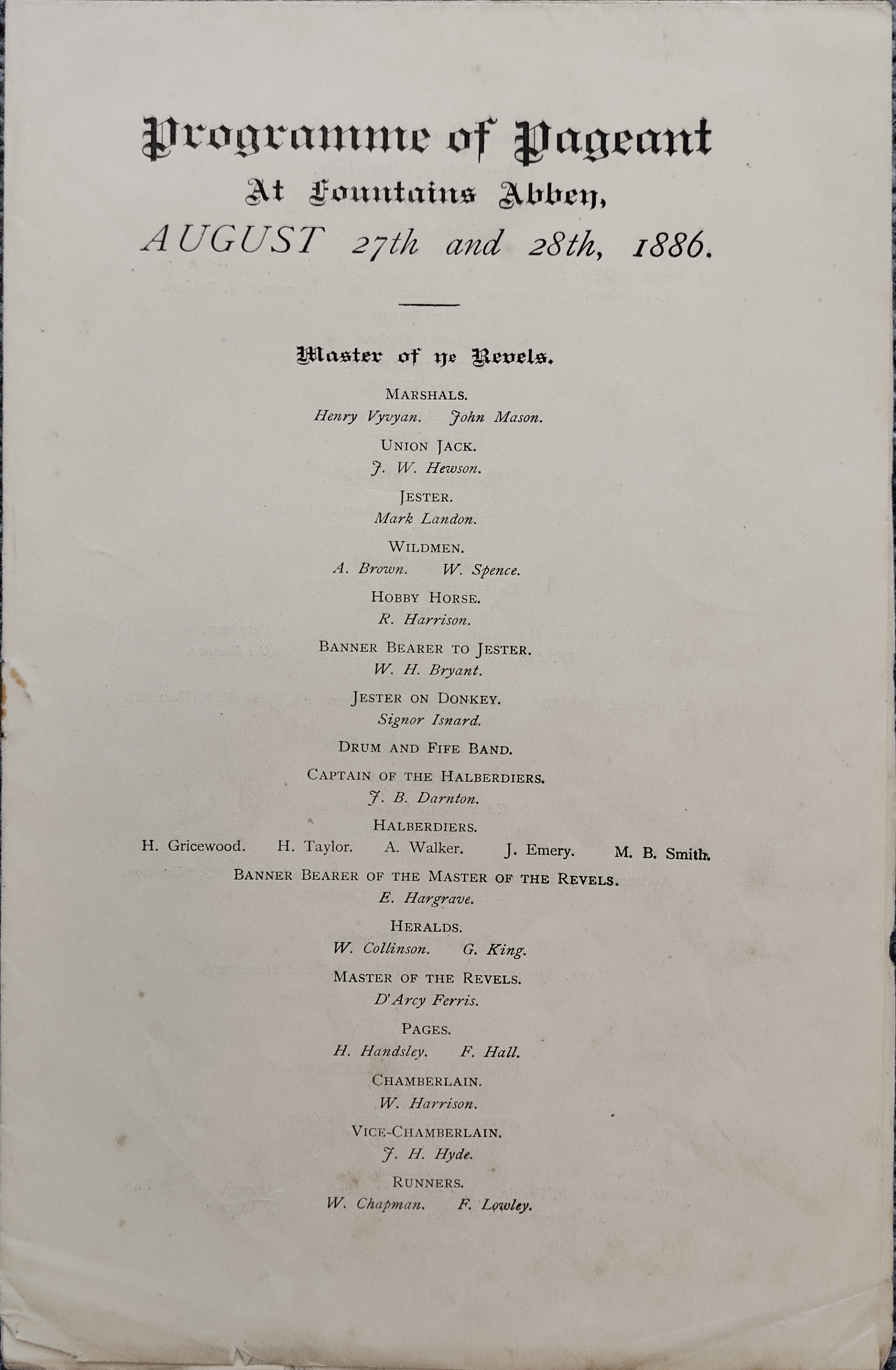
Programme of Pageant (Cover) for the Ripon Millenary Festival of 1886

Visitors started pouring into Ripon from all over the region. The mayor had declared a public holiday. Business was suspended and everyone went to the Studley Estate, which Lord Ripon had made available for the pageant. The estate included the Fountains Abbey, the best-preserved Cistercian abbey ruins in England. Both abbey and estate are now owned by the National Trust and were designated as World Heritage sites in 1986.

People arrived all morning by train, cart, and coach. The pageant marshalled at the high stables near Studley Royal House, the home of Lord Ripon, (Note: The house itself was destroyed by fire in 1946, but the stables remain, converted to a private house.) and then proceeded through the grounds to the Fountain Abbey where two choirs dressed as Benedictine monks and Cistercian monks sang appropriate music. The audience for Friday's pageant was estimated at 5,000 to 6,000 persons.

The play Robin Hood and ye Curtall Friar by Augustin Dawtrey, was performed on both Friday and Saturday. It had been selected from 17 submissions, and was specifically designed for an open-air performance, in that there was a minimum of dialogue and a great deal of singing. It was based on a traditional ballad describing an encounter between Robin Hood and a cleric at a stream near Fountains Abbey. The play, which ran for an hour, was enacted at this site.

The crowd assembled on three sides of an open area with the pageant players on the third side. The knightly sports then began with tilting, the riding with a lance at a mark, in this case a ring. This was followed by the revolving quintain (Note: Riding at the Ring and Quintain were favourite sports at country weddings in the 17th and 16th Centuries. (OED)) which struck the less skilled or unlucky, with one being knocked from his mount. This was followed by sword dancing, ribbon dancing. and then the jousting. The knights were mounted not on horses, but on hobby-horses. Rain halted the sport and the crowd returned to Ripon. In the evening, the Ripon Mechanic's Institute held an entertainment in the new public hall.

==== The composition of the pageant procession ====
The pageant featured the following, all in appropriate costume, either home-made, or hired from May & co., the London Costumiers.

- Wild men bearing clubs
- Twenty Druids on foot, some with harps, sickles, etc.
- A Roman Chariot and nine Romans.
- A horse-drawn float with a representation of a Viking ship with eight Vikings.
- Saxon rulers and clergy, totalling over two dozen, about half on horseback
- A horse-drawn float bearing St Wilfrid with a suite of over a dozen persons
- A horse-drawn float bearing King Alfred with eight attendants
- King Althelstan on horse-back with about a suite of seven.
- King Henry 4 on horseback, with his wife and a total retinue of ten between grooms, squires and court ladies.
- A floral arch symbolising peace with about twenty, including maidens, youths, and harvest boys.
- A horse-drawn float bearing the Queen of the harvest and eight young women attendants.
- The first two MPs for Ripon on horseback with a retinue of six in total.
- Five leading characters from Robin Hood, on foot
- The band of the 1sr West Yorkshire (Ripon) Volunteers
- Nearly forty foresters (who sang and performed in the Robin Hood play)
- Hugh Ripley, the last Wakeman of Ripon, with his lady, on horseback.
- A party of nearly twenty bearing manorial banners
- A horse-drawn float showing spur-makers bearing King James the I, his queen and eight attendants.
- A party of seven knights who were to take part in the jousting tournament with heralds, squires, and banner bearers.
- A party of fourteen banner bearers with the banners of different villages in the region
- A horse-drawn float bearing saddle-tree makers with a party of six.
- A horse-drawn float bearing hops and ale with a party of eighteen brewers.
- A horse-drawn float bearing flour with a party of six millers.
- King Charles I on horseback with a groom and three cavaliers.
- Fourteen banner-bearers with the banners of different medieval guilds:
  - Fleishers, i.e. butchers
  - Curriers, who dress and colour leather after it is tanned.
  - Tanners, who convert animal hides into leather by tanning.
  - Mercers, who deals in textile fabrics, especially silks, velvets, and other costly materials.
  - Farriers, who shoe horses or who treat their diseases.
  - Tailors, who make clothing to fit a particular customer.
  - Innholders, who manage houses providing accommodation, food, and drink.
  - Ropemakers, who make ropes.
  - Glovers, who make or sell gloves.
  - Cordwainers, who make shoes. The word now only survives in the name of the guild in London.
  - Barbers, who cut hair, but who originally practised surgery and dentistry until restricted to dentistry by Henry VIII,
  - Chemists, who deal in medicinal drugs (from Alchemist)
  - Dyers, who dye cloth and other materials.
  - Drapers, who originally made wollen cloth, but later applied to all dealers in cloth.
- Reed band of the 9th Lancers.
- A party of 25 priestesses.
- Seven boys bearing various banners.
- A horse-drawn float bearing the Lady Mayoress with the seven virtues in attendance and two boys representing the Rivers Ure and Skell.
- Eighteen young women as maypole dancers.
- A horse-drawn float bearing seven young women representing three graces and four seasons with attendant banner holders.
- Almost four dozen young girls in Georgian costume scattering flower petals.
- Eighteen boys and girls dressed as maypole dancers from the Georgian era.
- The Maypole Queen with her six attendants.
- Six sword dancers with three musicians, a clown, and a singer, from the village of Kirkby Malzeard.
- A Georgian era farmer with his wife on a pillion.
- A Georgian era shepherd and shepherdess with dog and lambs.
- The band of the 1st North Yorkshire (Bedale) Volunteers.
- Over forty persons being the Ripon City authorities and the mayors of other towns, all in full regalia.

The total number of pageant member is about 500 after excluding the dignitaries and bands from other towns. This represented nearly 5% of the 1881 population of Ripon (10,402). This is all the more extraordinary as there would have been people, such as coachmen, police, railway workers and the like, who played a supporting role without taking part. As well as those there were the programme sellers, caterers and others. The caterers had planned for refreshments for 500 pageant members on Friday, but ran short as there were 700 in total. They increased the provision for Saturday to 700.

=== Illustrations of the pageant procession by John Jellicoe ===
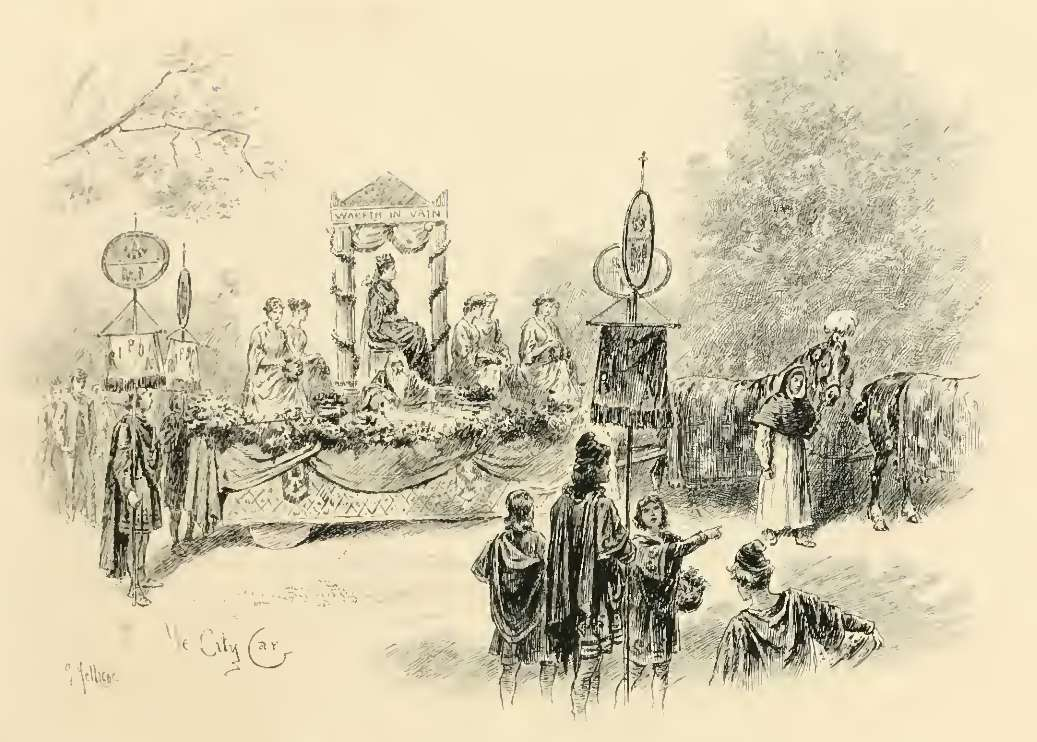
Ye City Car

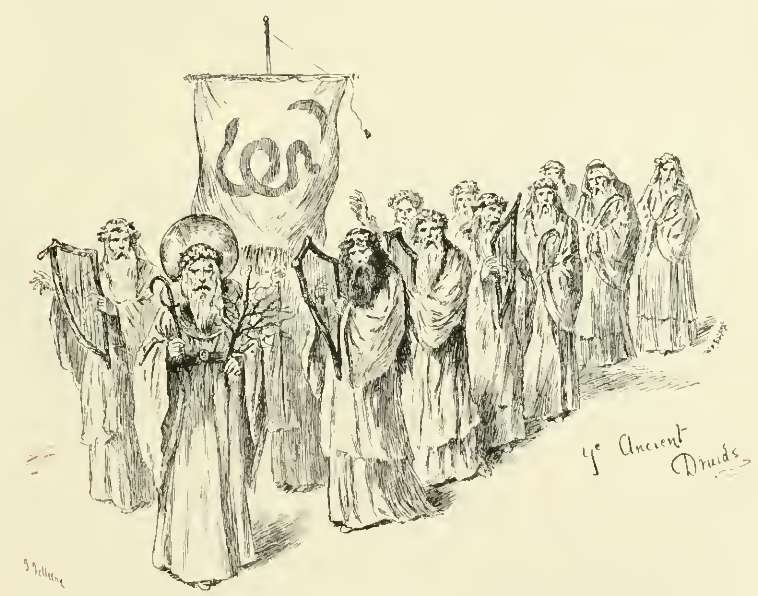
Ye ancient druids

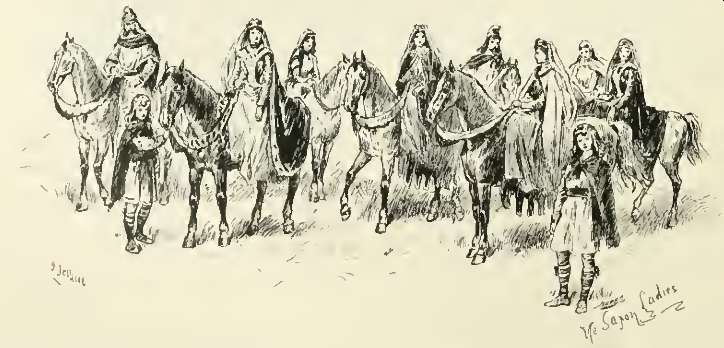
Ye Saxon Ladies

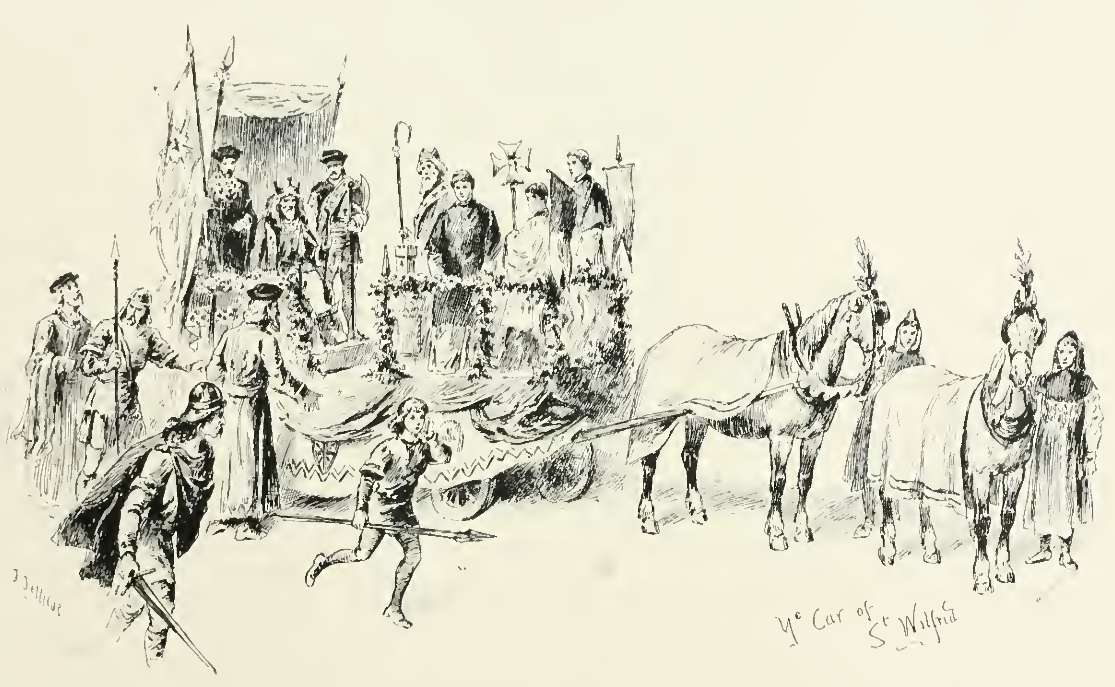
St Winfred

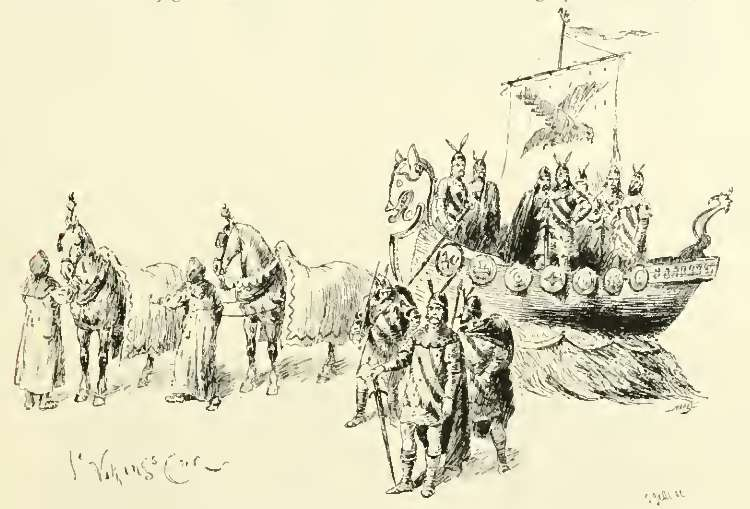
Ye Viking Cart

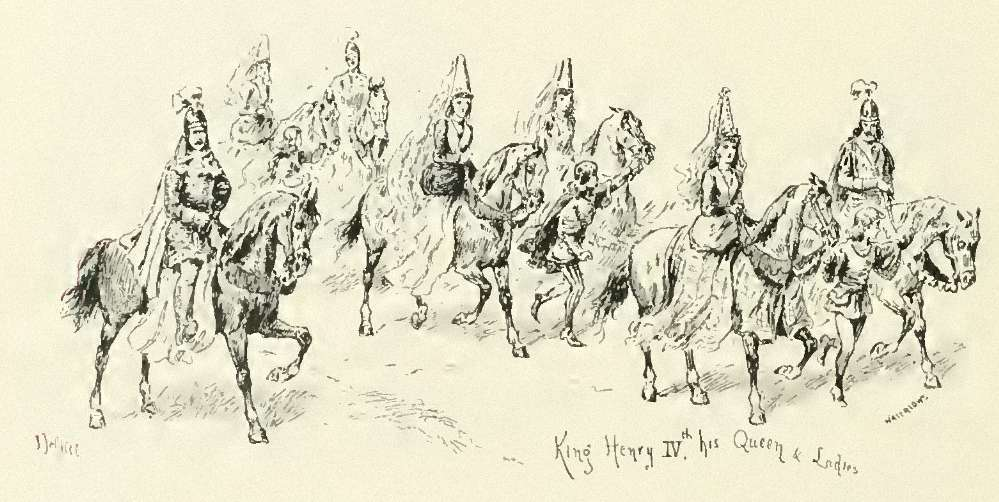
King Henry IV

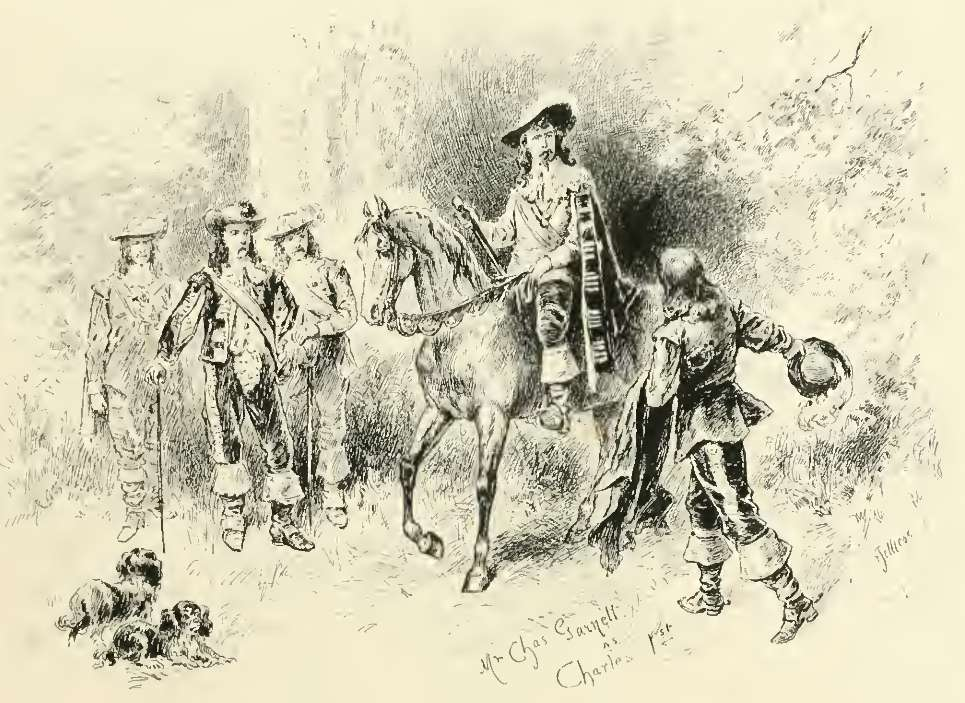
Charles I

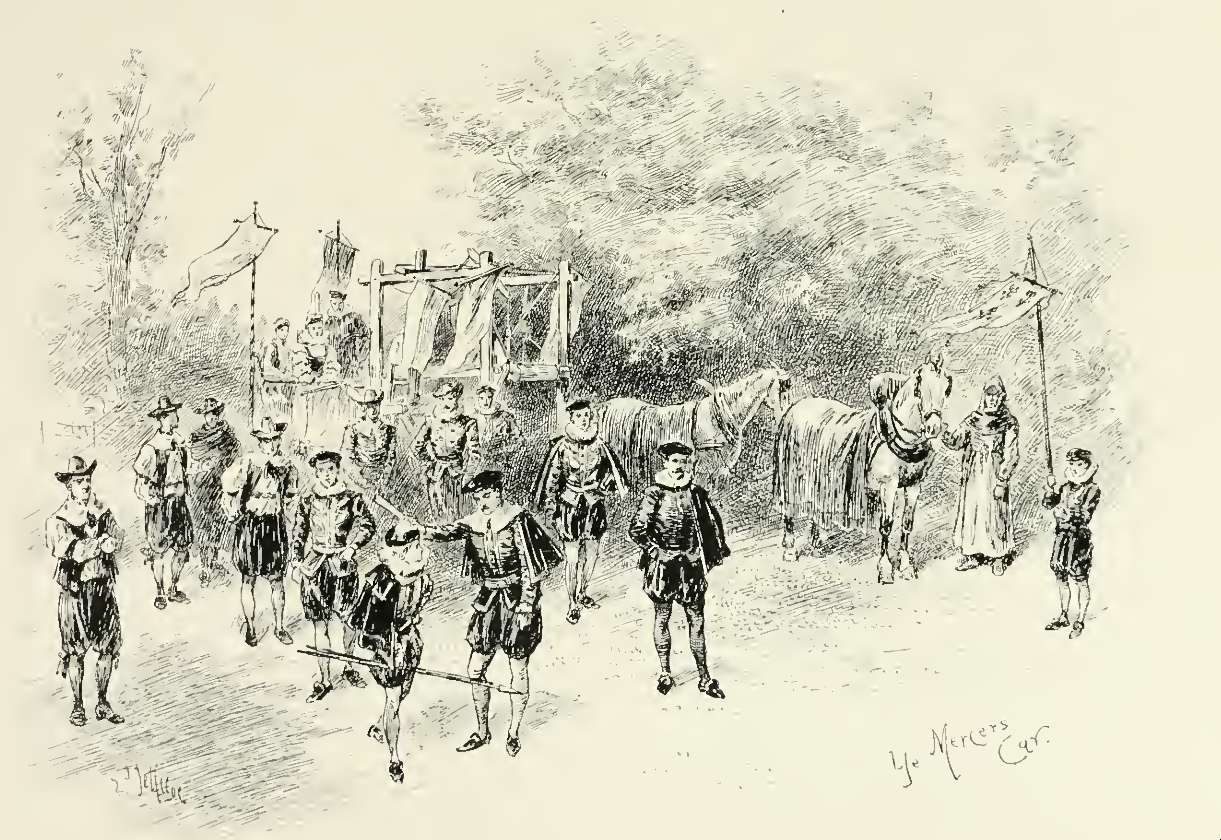
Ye Mercers Car

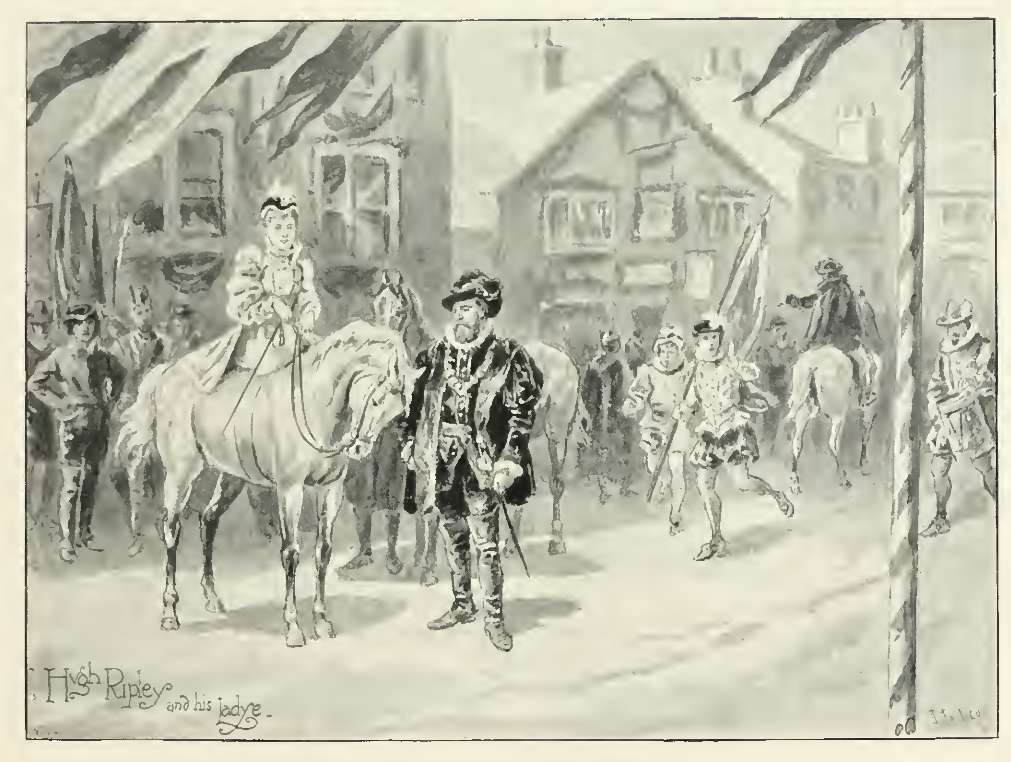
Hugh Ripley and his Ladye

== Saturday 28 August ==
The entrance fee for Friday was half-a-crown (2s 6d), but on Saturday the fee was one shilling only. Approximately 8,000 arrived by train, with another 10–12,000 by other means. As on Friday, the market place was thronged with shooting galleries, carousels, swing-boats and other attractions. The pageant again assembled at Studley, and at one thirty, again processed to Fountains Abbey. The play was performed, Friday's entertainments were repeated, this time with addition of a mock bull-baiting with boys playing the role of dogs. The parade returned to Ripon, and forming up at the entrance to the town at 7:30 proceeded to the town hall, where there were a few speeches and the festival was formally closed.

== Tuesday 31 August ==
There were no festival activities on Sunday or Monday. There was a reception at the New Public Hall to commemorate the conclusion of the festival, for all those who had taken part in the procession or otherwise assisted. The only requirement was they come in costume. The colourful spectacle drew a large crowd. The reception was followed by a country dance.

== Wednesday 1 September ==
In the final activity of the festival, there was a venison supper for the Foresters at the White Horse Hotel in Ripon. The venison came from a buck, whose dead body, was used as a prop in the play. The buck, from the herd of Lord Ripon, was presented to them by him. This supper concluded all the official doings of the celebration of Ripon's millenary.

== The success of the pageant ==
Marshall notes that The play, the revels, and the procession were an enormous success and were repeated, under Ferris's direction ten and twenty years later. The theme for the 1896 pageant was Boadicea to Victoria, followed by the tercentenary of the James I charter to the town in 1904, and a three-day pageant play and revels in 1906. The success of the Ripon Millenary Festival established D'Arcey Ferris as the nation's leading Master of Revels and Pageant Master of the nineteenth century.

== Other pageants ==
The Ripon Festival was a large pageant for its time, but the following years saw not only more pageants, but also larger and more complex pageants as the movement grew.

The Historic Pageants in Britain Website details some 656 historical pageants in the UK since 1900, 117 of which had more than 1,000 performers.

John Jellicoe, who drew many of the Illustrations in the Book of the Ripon Festival illustrated another pageant book over twenty years later. This was the York Historic Pageant in 1909, which ran for six days from (Monday 26 July 1909 – Saturday 31 July 1909). This pageant presented the history of York in seven episodes. It raised £14,150, of which about £1,000 was in excess of costs. The pageant made so much money that the organisers were able to reimburse the subscribers to the guarantee fund of £1,600 in full. The pageant was seen by 30,000 people and was performed by a cast of 2,500. The scale of the York pageant illustrates how pageants had developed since the Ripon Festival, as does the decision to use colour illustrations for the book of the pageant, the developments in printing and illustration over the period. The York pageant coincided with two other large pageants in the same week, at Chester and Cardiff.
