= Channing =

Channing may refer to:

== Places ==
- Channing, Michigan, United States
- Channing, Texas, United States, a town
- Channing, Manitoba, Canada, a rural neighborhood of Flin Flon

== Schools ==
- Channing School, Highgate, London, UK, an independent day school for girls
- Channing High School, Channing, Texas, United States

== Other uses ==
- Channing (name), a list of people and fictional characters with the given name or surname
- Channing (TV series), a 1960s television series, also known as The Young and the Bold, starring Jason Evers and Henry Jones

== See also ==
- The Channings (novel), an 1862 novel by Ellen Wood
- The Channings (film), a 1920 British silent crime film, based on the novel
