= John Jellicoe (illustrator) =

British illustrator (1842–1914)

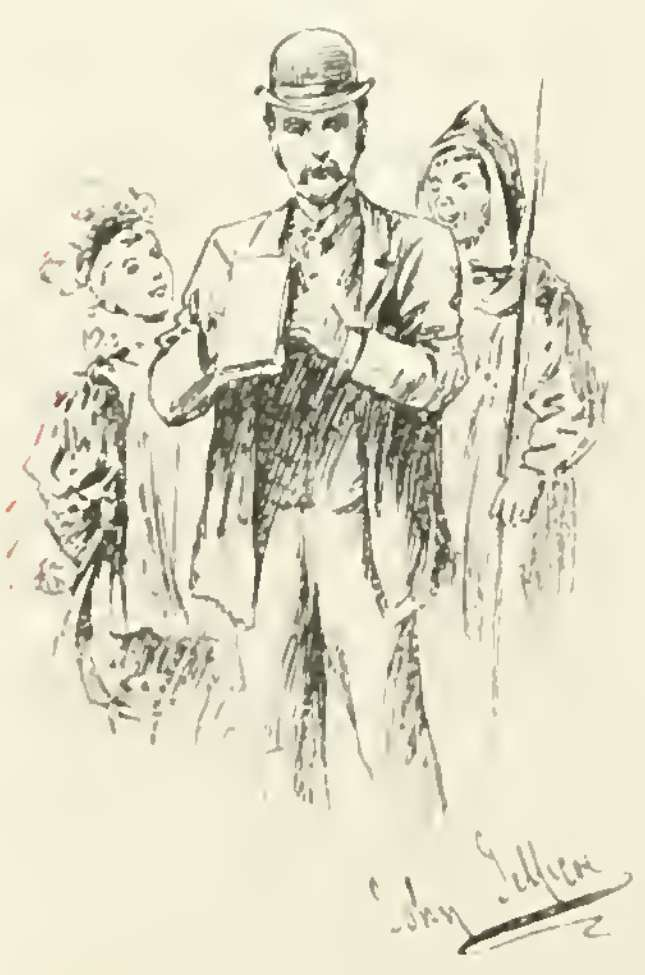
- John Jellicoe at the Ripon millenary festival - probably a self-portrait
- Born: John Timothy Jellicoe; 5 January 1842; London, England
- Died: June 1914 (aged 72); Willesden, London, England
- Occupation: Illustrator
- Years active: 1869–1912
- Known for: Illustrating sporting and dramatic events
- Notable work: The Record of the Ripon Millenary

John Timothy Jellicoe (5 January 1842 – buried 13 June 1914) was a British illustrator who produced large number of illustrations for newspapers and magazines as well as illustrating books and stories by a wide range of authors.

== Early life ==
Jellicoe was born in London on 5 January 1842 to George Daniel Jellicoe (31 May 1799 – 8 December 1877), a solicitor's clerk and Ann Thomas (c. 1810 – October 1875). The census returns show Jellicoe as the second child of his parents. Ann Thomas was his father's second wife, and Jellicoe had a half-sister Harriet Sophia Jellicoe (1828 – aft. March 1911) (Note: His half-sister Jellicoe was living with him in 1911, and was described as half-witted on the census form. She was 82 at the time.) and three half-brothers alive when he was born. (Note: another two half-brothers had dies in infancy.) Jellicoe was baptised on 20 February 1842 in St Mary, Islington, London.

== Marriages and family ==
Jellicoe married Georgina Annie Wiltshire (12 December 1841 – 18 October 1872), at Millbrook, Hampshire on 23 May 1868. The couple had one son, George Edward Jellicoe (c. 1872 – aft. 1924) who became a publisher. (Note: Sir Geoffrey Allan Jellicoe (8 October 1900 – 17 July 1996), the famous Landscape architect was George Edward's son)

At the time of the 1871 Census, Jellicoe was living at 1 Brook Road, Stoke Newington, London, where his son, George Edward, was born. Georgina died on 18 October 1872. Jellicoe remarried three years later to Charlotte Anne Holland (1845 – October–November 1913). They had two children Mabel (1877–1945) and Gordon (1885–1941).

The 1881 census found Jellicoe living at 2 Grosvenor Park Villas with his wife and two children. His occupation had changed from artist in wood to artist (figures). By 1891 Jellicoe was living at 74 Parkhill Road, Hampstead, where he would remain until 1907 at least. By the 1911 census he was staying at Gondar House, Gondar Gardens in Hampstead. By 1913 he was living at 5 Park Avenue, north of Hampstead.

== Works ==
John studied art in London and began exhibiting in 1865. He exhibited pen and ink drawings, paintings, and watercolours at the Society of British Artists and the Royal Academy. (Note: It is not clear if the Royal Academy, which had originally refused to exhibit Watercolours had changed its policy by this time.) Jellicoe was regarded as an exceptionally fine figure artist and often collaborated with other illustrators by drawing figures into their illustrations of buildings and places.

=== Periodical Illustrations ===
Jellicoe was an illustrator for the Illustrated Sporting and Dramatic News as well as illustrating for other periodicals including the Illustrated London News, St. Paul's Magazine, (Note: The publisher James Virtue set up St Paul's Magazine to rival Cornhill and copied the format, frequency and price. Virtue originally hope the call it Anthony Trollope's Magazine.) The Windsor Magazine, and the boys' papers Union Jack and The Boy's Own Paper.

==== Illustrations of the Ripon Millenary Festival ====
Jellicoe attended the Ripon Millenary Festival, held in Ripon, North Yorkshire, in 1886. This was one of the pageants of the late Victorian vogue for Merrie England.

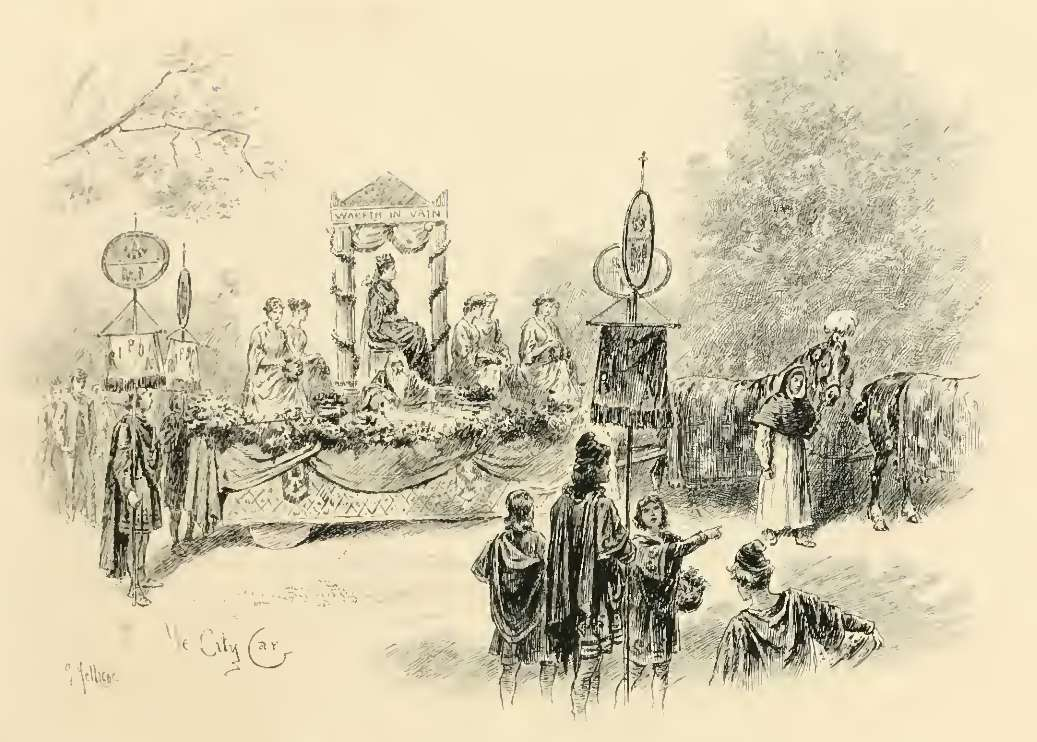
Ye City Car

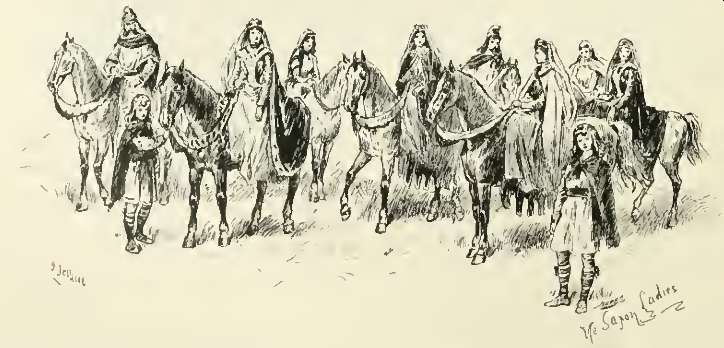
Ye Saxon Ladies

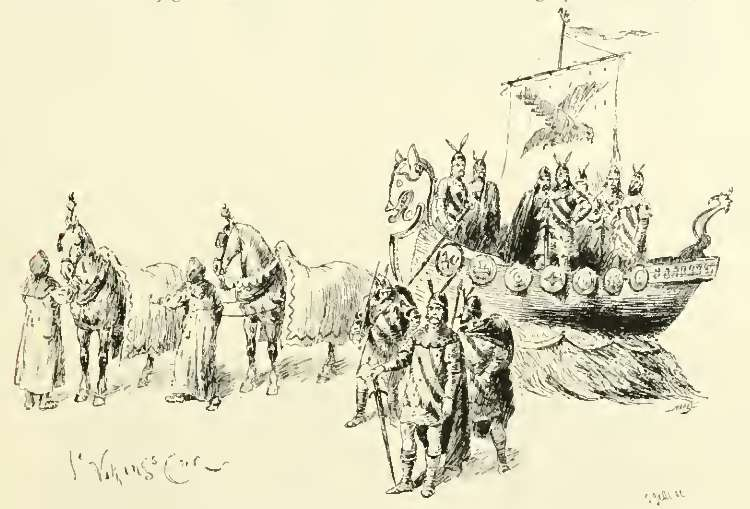
Ye Viking Cart

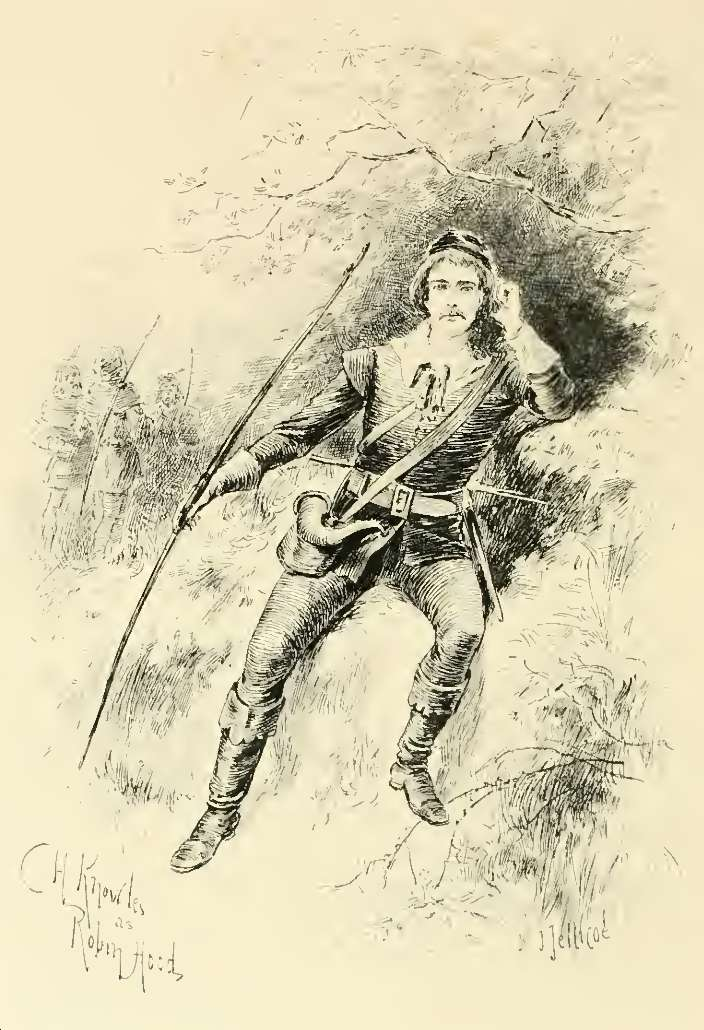
Robin Hood

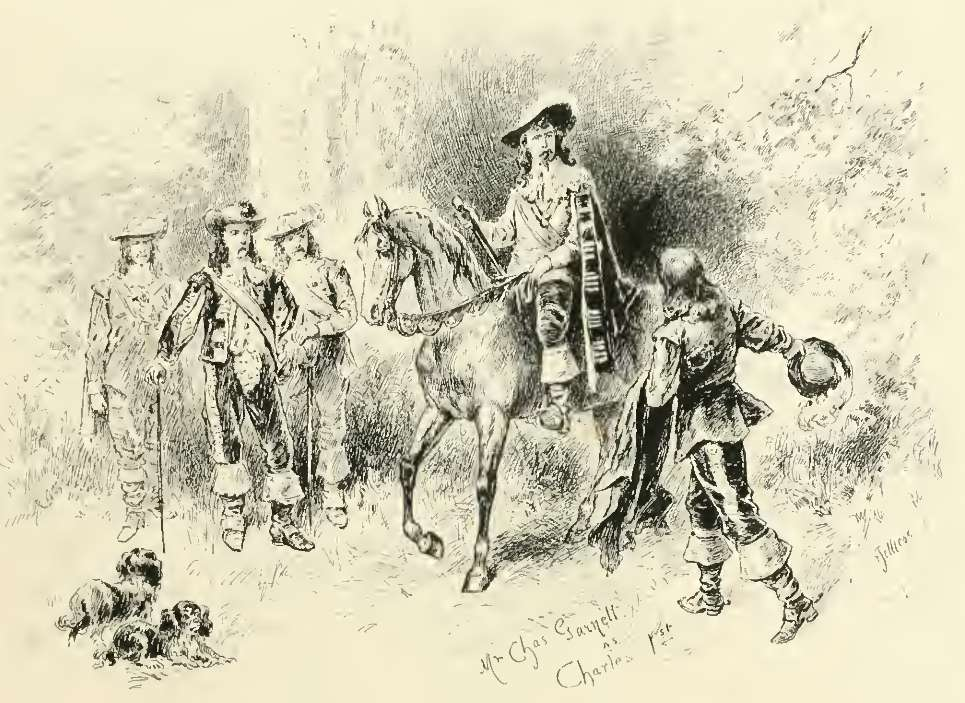
Charles I

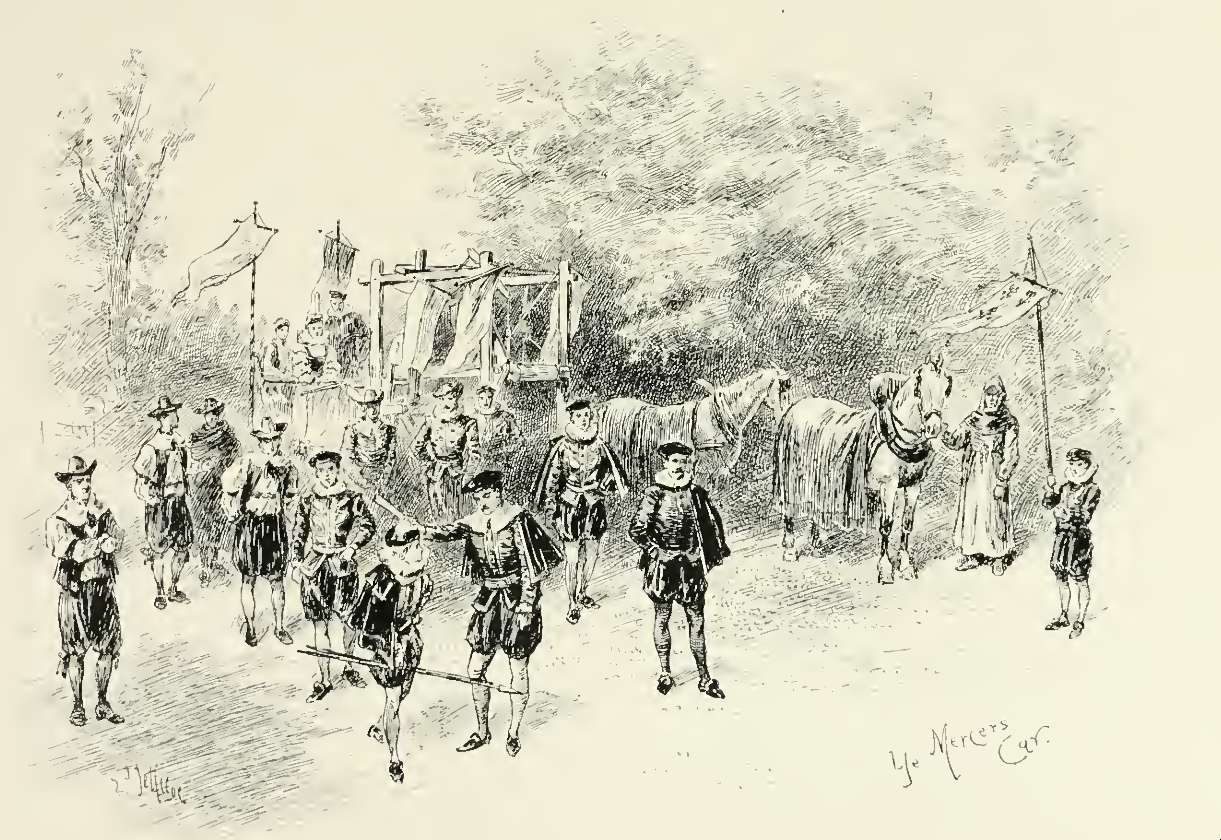
Ye Mercers Car

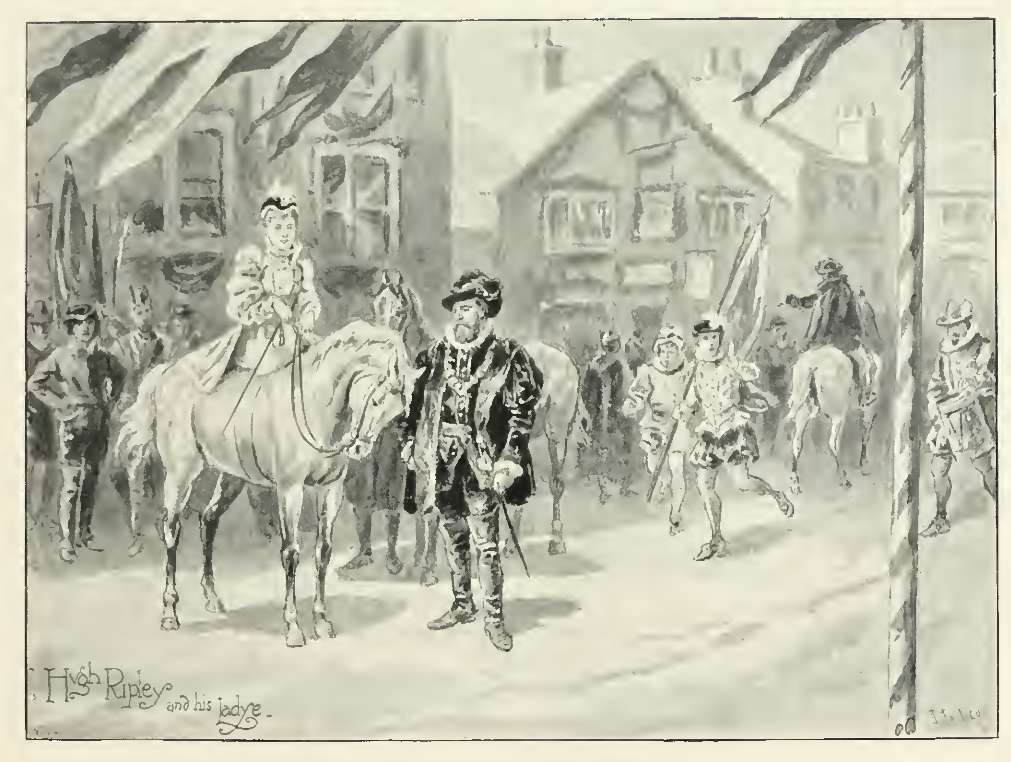
Hugh Ripley and his Ladye

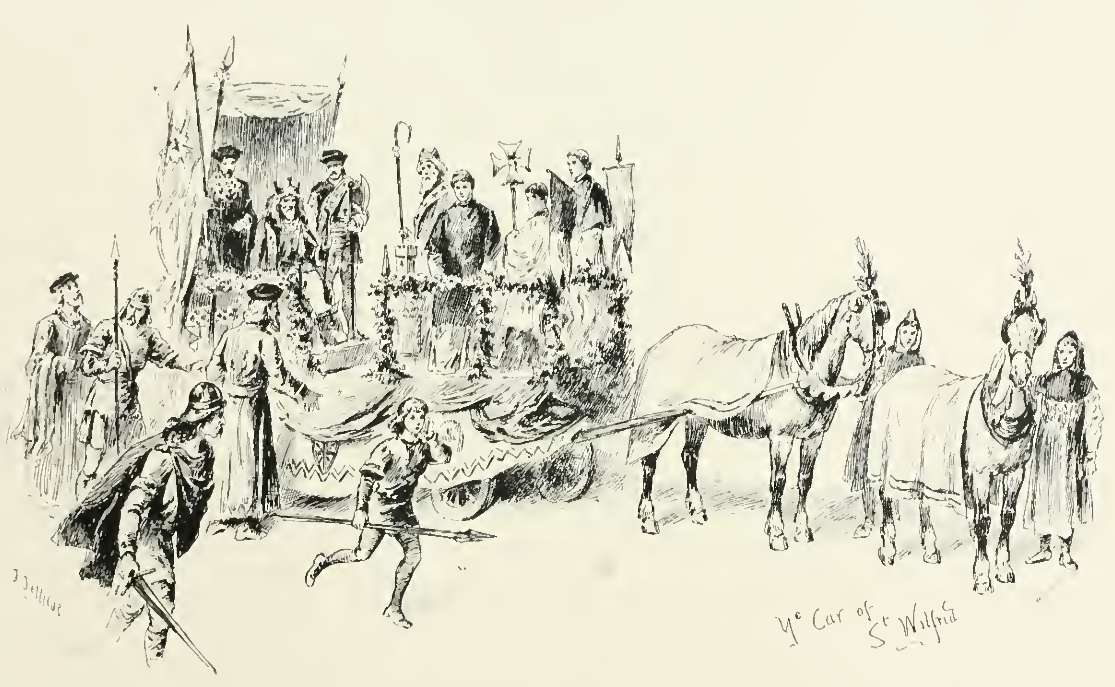
St Winfred

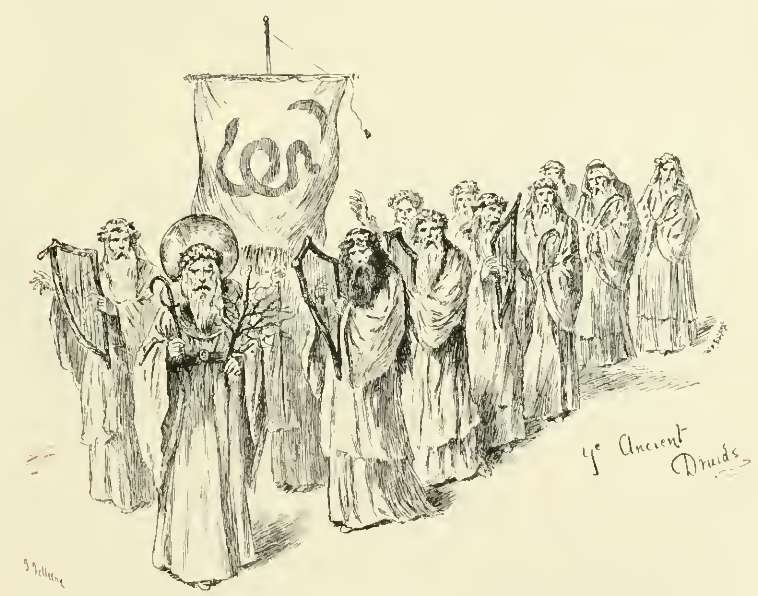
Ye ancient druids

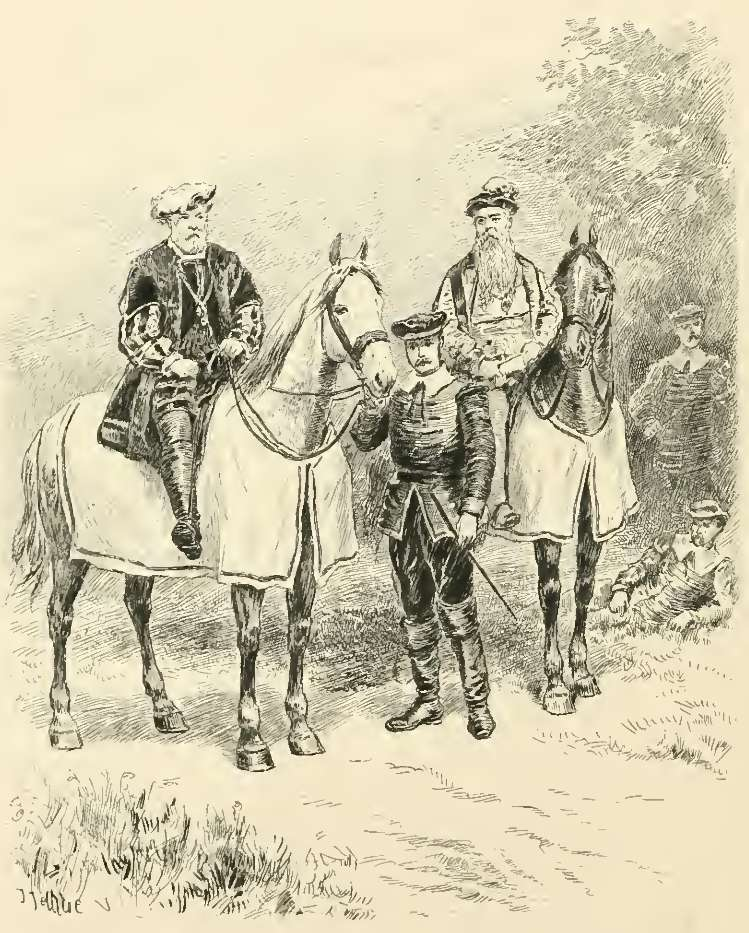
The first two Members of Parliament for Ripon

=== Book illustrations ===
Jellicoe illustrated books and stories by the following authors (source of the attribution is cited for each author):

- Rev. Alfred Allen Brockington (1872–1938), a schoolmaster, Anglican cleric, poet, and writer on religious topics, mysticism, and school stories.
- Charlotte Brontë (1816–1855), a poet and novelist and the eldest of the three Brontë Sisters.
- Robert Browning (1812–1899), the poet and playwright.
- William Boyd Carpenter (1841–1918), Bishop of Ripon at the time of the Millenary Festival.
- Alfred John Church (1829–1912), a classical scholar who wrote books on the Romans and Greeks, as well as other historical topics.
- Mrs. Henry Clarke (1853–1908), who wrote historical fiction and children's books.
- Harry Collingwood (1843–1922), a writer of boys' adventure fiction, usually in a nautical setting. who wrote boys' adventure fiction, usually in a nautical setting.
- Charles Dickens (1812–1870), for whom Jellicoe illustrated posthumous reissues.
- John Finnemore (1863–1915), who wrote books and stories for younger readers, as well as school textbooks.
- Oliver Goldsmith (1728–1774), the Irish poet and playwright.
- M. Y. Halidom (1838–1914), a pseudonym of Alexander Huth, a writer of supernatural stories who also wrote under the pseudonym Dryasdust.
- W. Harrison (1847 – c. 1895), the printer in Ripon responsible for collating the Record of the Ripon Millenary Festival.
- Bernard Heldmann (1857–1915), a prolific author who published 76 novels and hundreds of short stories.
- Mrs. R. E. Henry, primarily a playwright, but also wrote Fairy tales.
- G. A. Henty (1832–1902), a prolific writer of boy's adventure fiction, often set in a historical context, who had himself served in the military and been a war correspondent.
- Dr. Johnson (1709–1784), the famous diarist.
- Andrew Lang (1844–1912), the prolific Scottish author interested in folk and fairy tales.
- Mary Cornwall Legh (1857–1941), a British Anglican missionary.
- Emma Leslie (1838–1909), Emma Boultwood, wrote more than 100 books, mostly juvenile and historical titles with a Christian message.
- Winifred Mary Letts (1882–1972), an English-born writer who spent most of her life in Ireland, writing plays, novels, and children's fiction.
- John Leyland (c. 1858 – 1924), who wrote guidebooks and books on nautical themes.
- Charles Rathbone Low (1837–1918), an Irishman who served in the Royal Indian Navy and wrote historical works and adventure fiction.
- Anne Manning (1807–1879), who wrote both fiction and non-fiction.
- Bessie Marchant (1862–1941), who wrote adventure fiction featuring young female heroines.
- H. R. McEniry, who wrote Twelve Parables of Our Lord, Illustrated and Illuminated.
- A. F. Mockler-Ferryman (1856–1930), a British Army officer who wrote about geography, history, and the military.
- Frank Frankfort Moore (1855–1931), an Irish journalist, playwright, novelist, poet, and biographer.
- James Macdonald Oxley (1855–1907), a Canadian writer of juvenile fiction.
- Charles Eyre Pascoe (1842–1912), who wrote on the stage, travelogues, guides to schools, souvenirs and other works.
- Eliza Caroline Phillips (1847–1923), who wrote illustrated books for small children.
- Charles Pond (1856–1931), comedian who wrote the sketch The Fully Licensed Man, which was recited over 11,000 times.
- Robert Richardson (1850–1901), an Australian poet, writer, and journalist who wrote novels for children, stories for boy's papers, and books about travel.
- Charles Napier Robinson (1849–1938), a Royal Naval officer who on retirement, became a journalist on naval matters and published the journal The Navy and Army Illustrated : a magazine descriptive and illustrative of everyday life in the defensive service of the British Empire.
- Thomas Roscoe (1791–1871), and English author and translator.
- Richmond Seeley (1833–1913), a London publisher who worked with his cousin Alfred John Church to produce illustrated versions of stories from the classics.
- John Walter Sherer (1823–1911), a novelist and a member of the Bengal Civil Service at the time of the Indian Mutiny.
- Grace Stebbing (1840–1936), a prolific author of moral tales for boys and girls as well as historical romances and biographies. She wrote her first book aged 7 and her last one at 91, with 89 books in total as well as numerous short stories.
- Clement Strong, who wrote stories for boys papers.
- Robert Smith Surtees (1805–1864), an editor, novelist and sporting writer.
- Lord Tennyson (1809–1892), the Poet Laureate of the United Kingdom during much of Queen Victoria's reign.
- Lily Watson (1849–1932), an English Baptist who wrote novels and instructional works.
- Mrs. Henry Wood (1814–1887), an English novelist who turned to writing to support her family when her husband's business failed, and whose work was widely read in the United States and Australia.

==== Example of book illustration ====
While most of Jellicoe's illustrations were line drawings, he did a number of illustrations in colour. The Story of Joan of Arc (1906) was a children's book written by Andrew Lang (31 March 1844 – 20 July 1912). The book was published in by T. C. and E. C. Jack in London and Edinburgh. Jellicoe produced eight colour illustrations for the book, one of which (the wounding in battle) was used as a book cover.

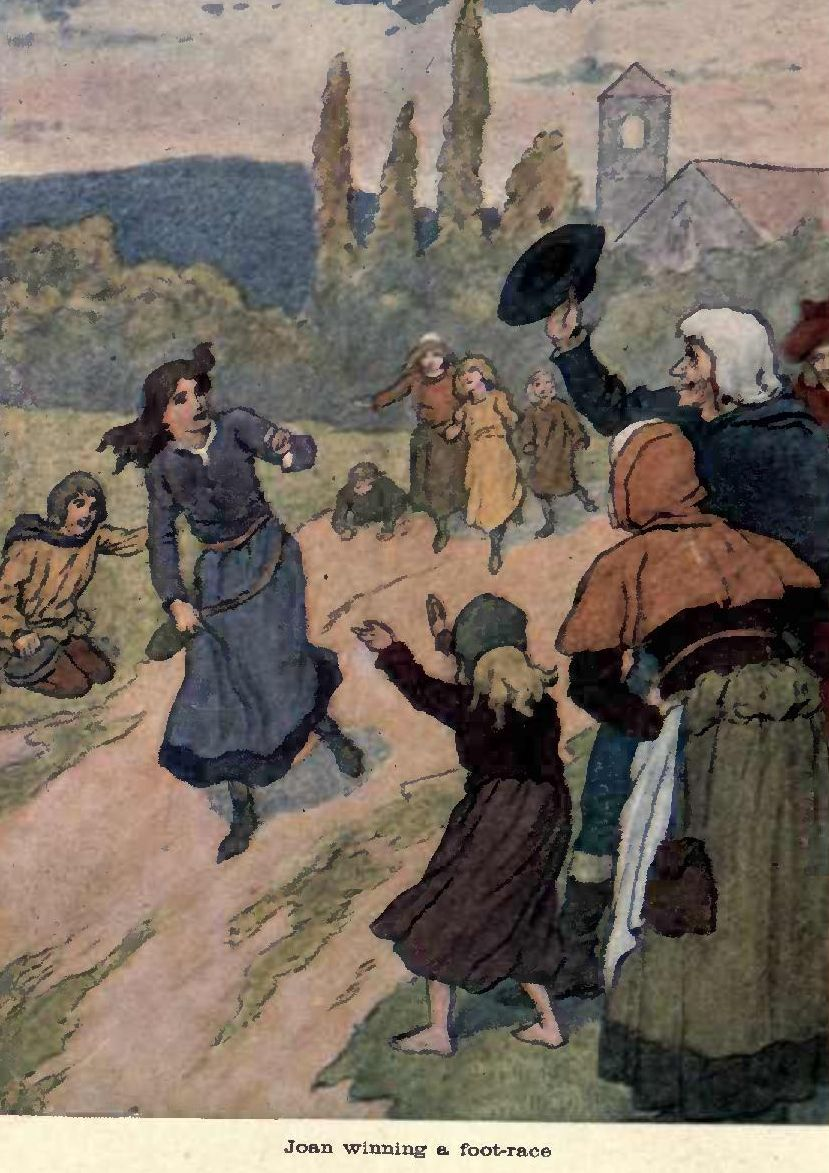
Joan winning a foot race

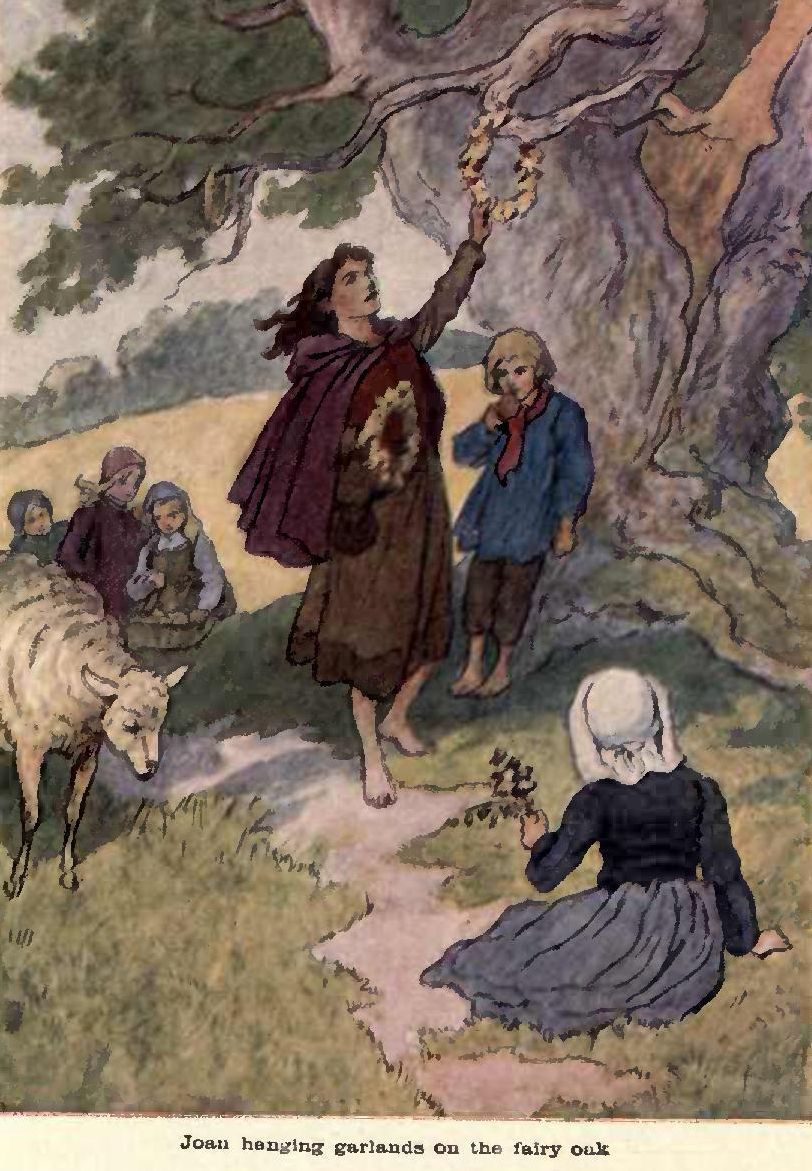
Joan of Arc hanging a garland on a fairy oak

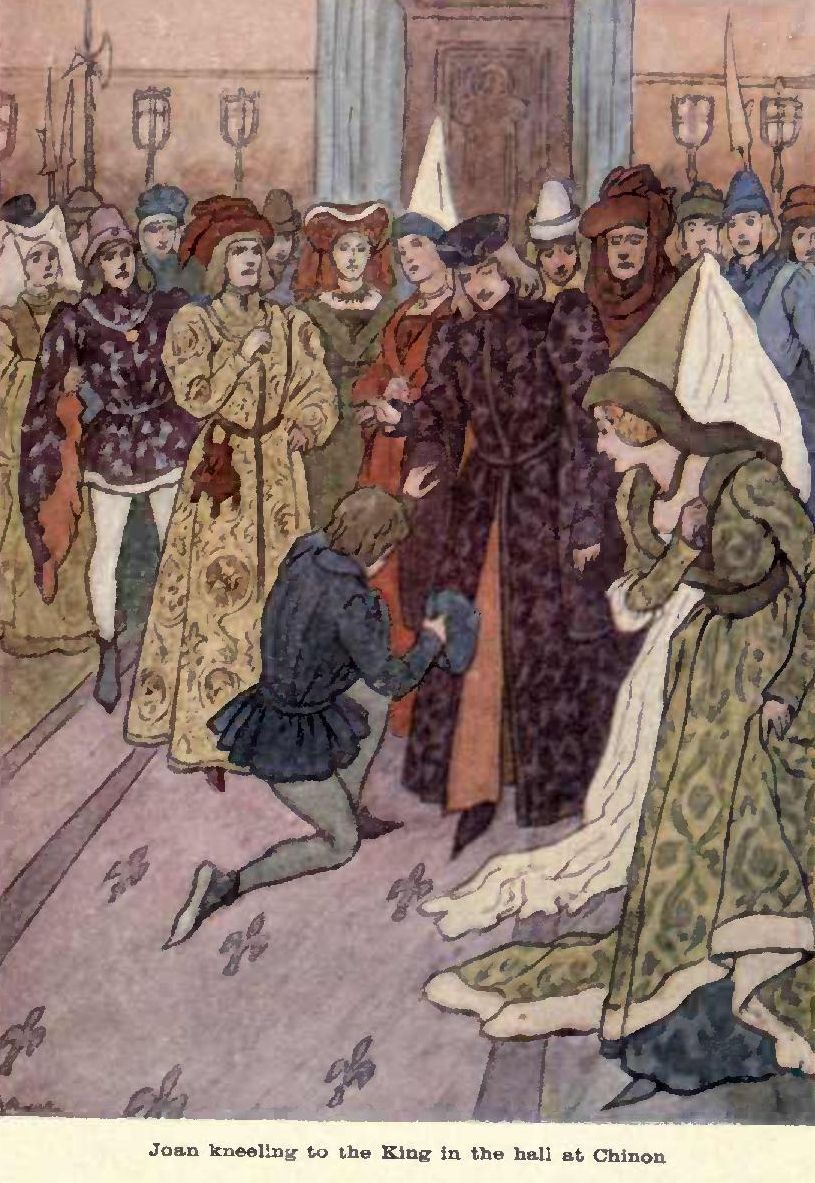
Joan kneeling to the King of France

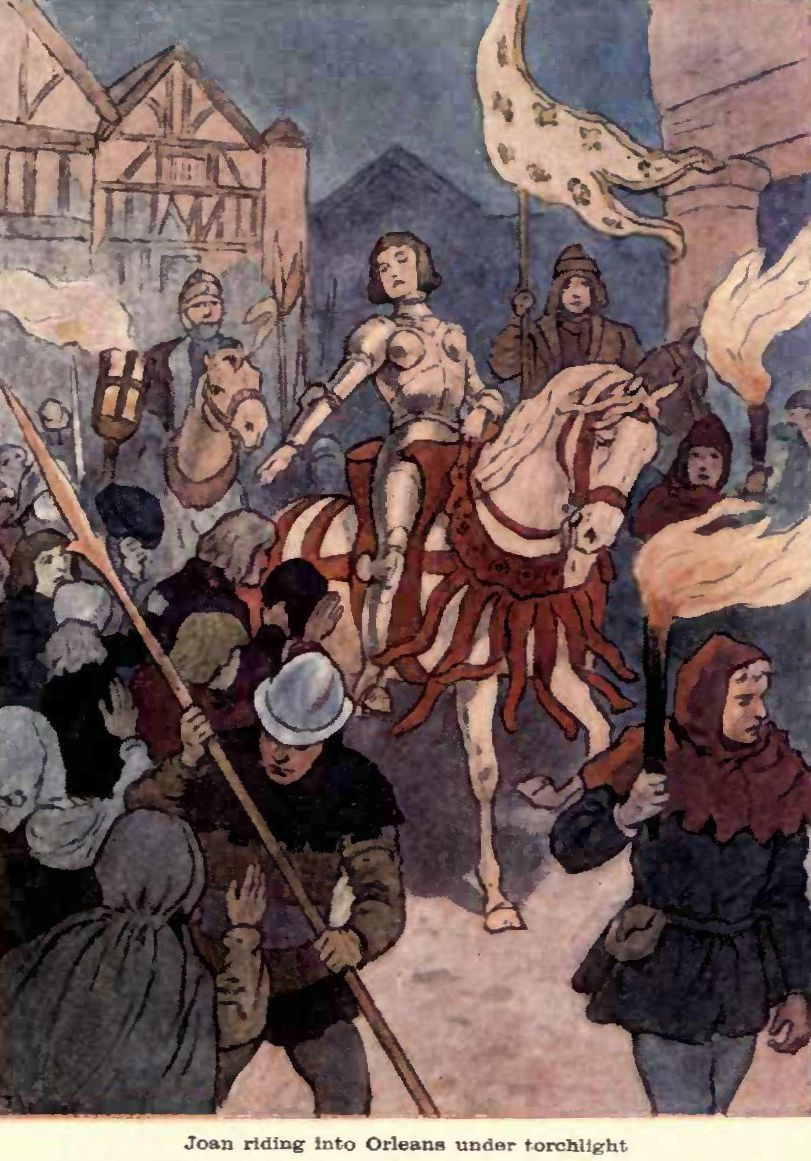
Joan of Arc riding into Orleans by torchlight

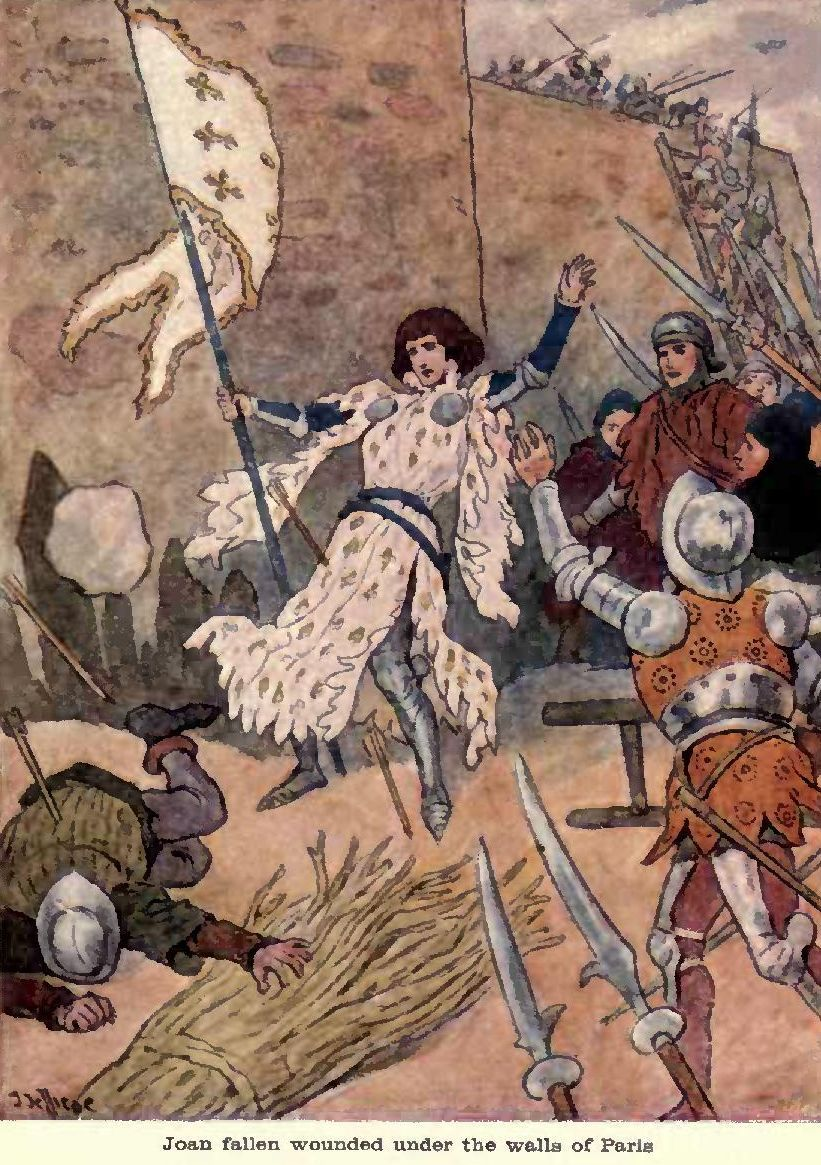
Joan of Arc wounded in battle

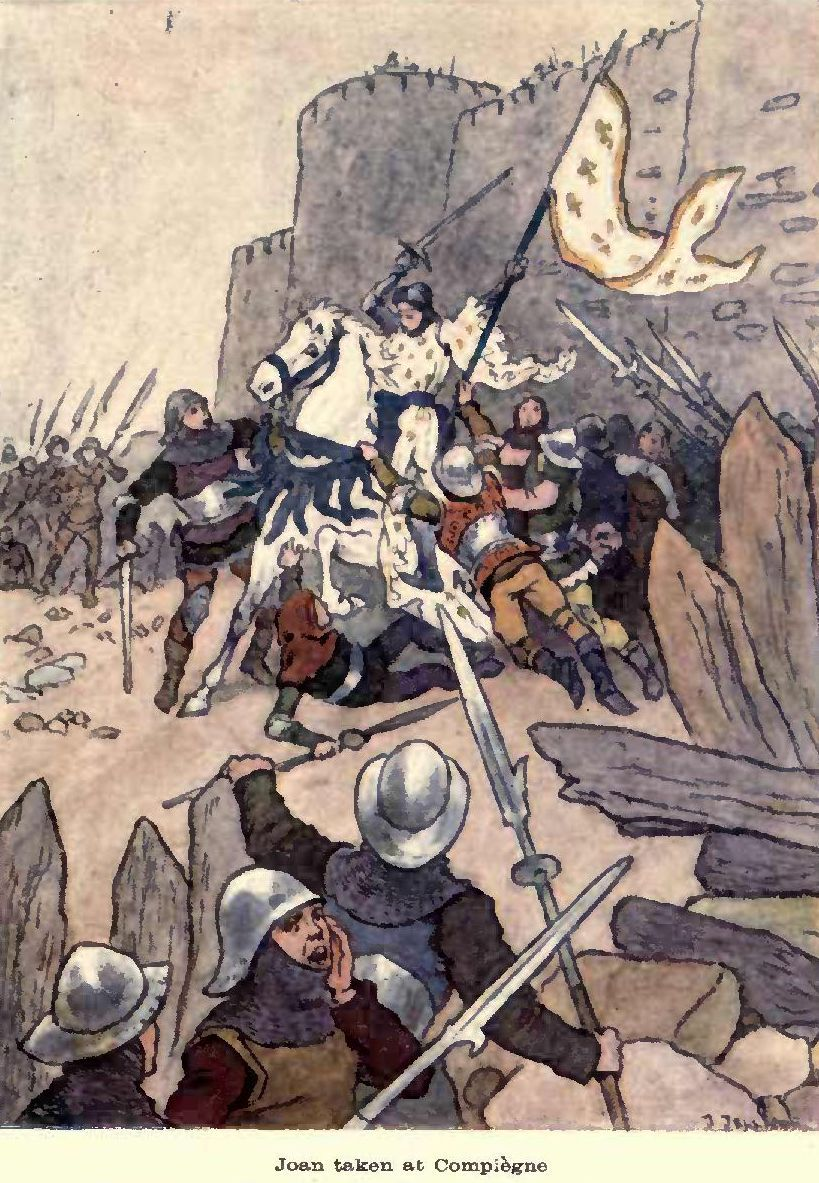
Joan of Arc taken prisoner

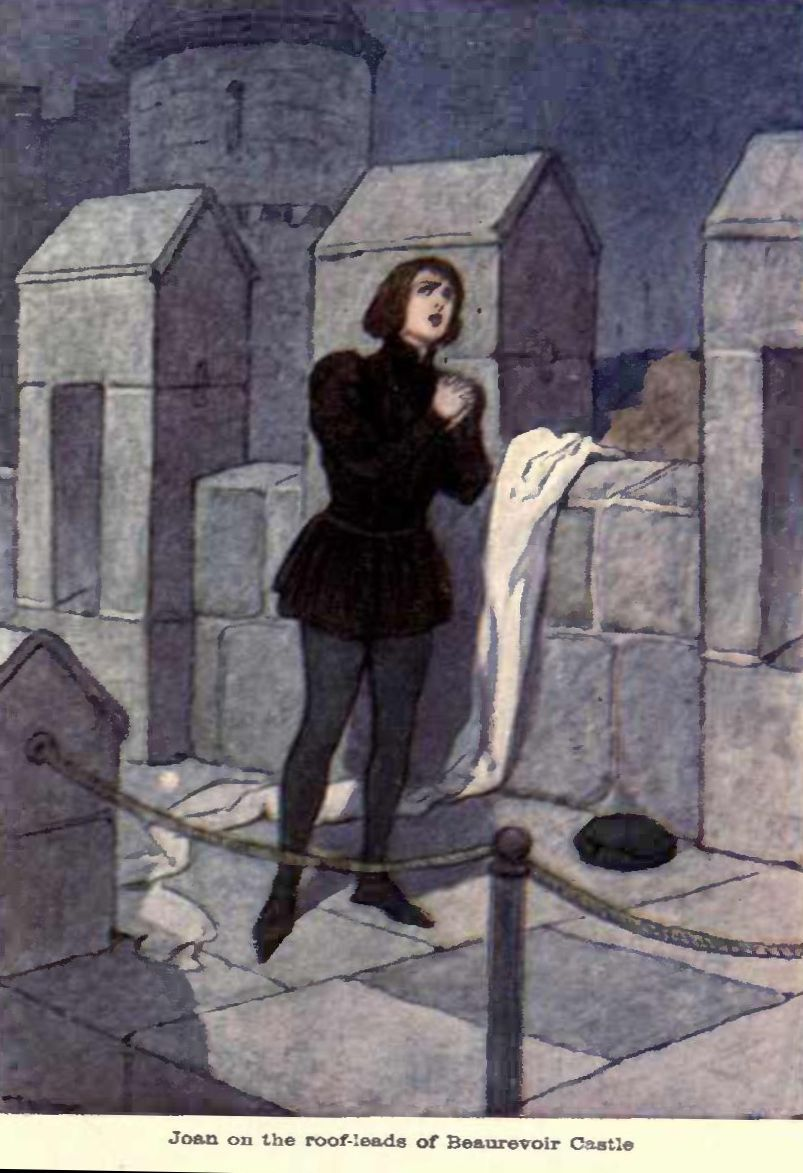
Joan of Arc praying for guidance

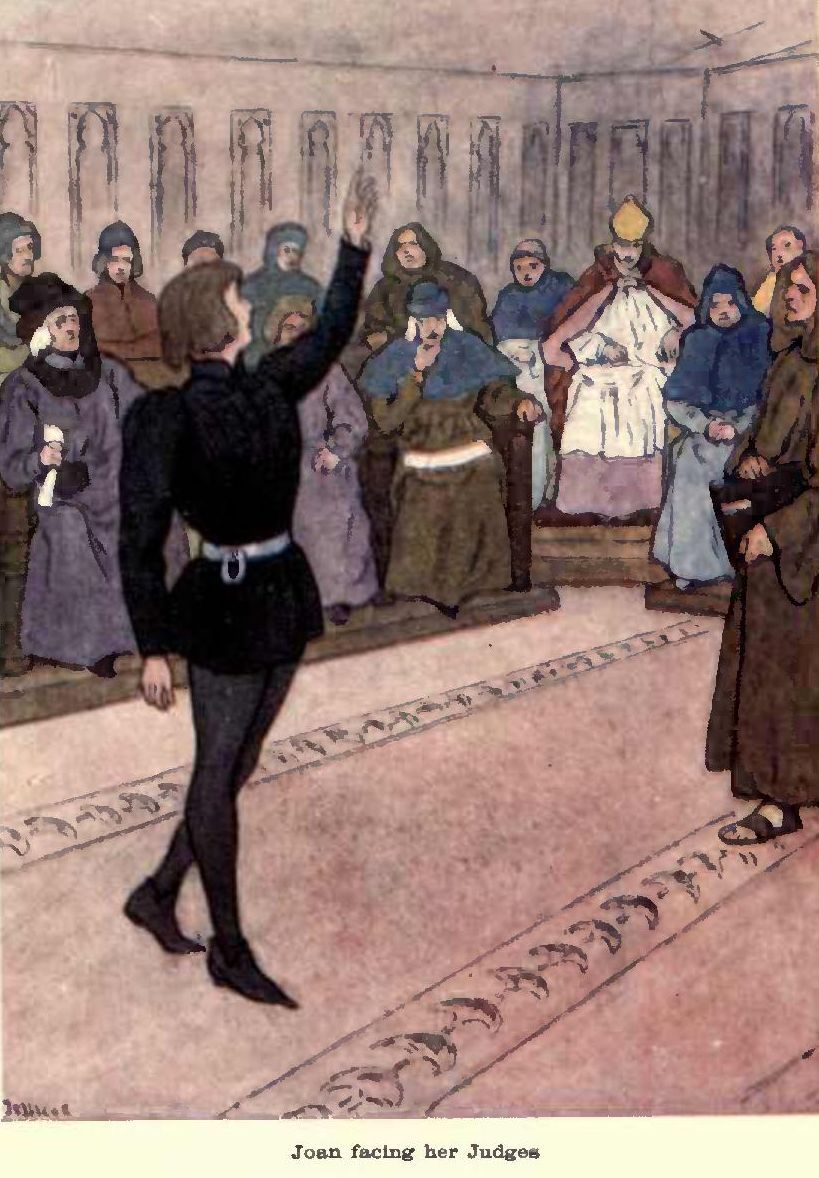
Joan of Arc on trial for witchcraft

== Death ==
Charlotte died in Willesden in October or November 1913, and Jellicoe followed in June 1914. He was buried on 13 June 1914 in the same plot in Hampstead Cemetery where Charlotte had been buried on 4 November.
