= Lucille Western =

American actress (1843–1877)

Pauline Lucille Western (born in New Orleans, 8 January 1843; died in Brooklyn, New York, 11 January 1877) was an American stage actress .

== Biography ==
Her parents were actors. She made her first appearance on the stage with her sister Helen Western (1844–1868) as “change artist” at her father's theatre in Washington, D.C., and traveled extensively with her in the United States. They were known as the “Star Sisters,” and their principal play was the “Three Fast Men.” In 1858 they appeared at the Old Bowery Theatre in New York City.

In the 1860s, Lucille appeared at the Holliday Street Theatre in “East Lynne,” achieving her first success. In 1861 to 1865 she traveled with a combination troupe, playing Nancy Sykes in “Oliver Twist,” with Edward L. Davenport as Bill Sykes and James W. Wallack, Jr., as Fagin. In 1865 she played in Philadelphia, appearing in “Eleanor's Victory,” “Lucretia Borgia,” “Jane Eyre,” “The Child-Stealer,” “Mary Tudor,” “Cynthia,” besides the two plays already mentioned. She appeared in the principal theatres in the United States, and at the time of her death was playing at the New Park Theatre, Brooklyn.

On 11 October 1859, she married James Harrison Mead. Her remains are buried in Mount Auburn Cemetery.

Her younger sister, Helen Western was also an actress and at one time was the girlfriend of John Wilkes Booth.
