= East Lynne (1922 film) =

1922 film

- Directed by: Charles Hardy
- Based on: novel by Mrs Henry Wood
- Produced by: Charles Hardy
- Starring: Ethel Jerdan; Don McAlpine
- Release date: 18 November 1922
- Running time: 6 reels
- Country: Australia
- Languages: Silent film English intertitles

East Lynne is a 1922 Australian silent film directed by actor and exhibitor Charles Hardy. It was a modern-day adaptation of the famous 1861 novel which had been filmed many times in England and the USA.

It is often considered a lost film. However it was shown on 19 November 2023 on Talking Pictures TV as part of Gaslight Follies.

== Plot ==
Married Isobel Vane is told by Sir Francis Levison that her husband Richard has been unfaithful. Levison seduces Isobel, but then abandons her. Isobel returns home after years away only to find out that Richard had assumed she was dead and has remarried. She pretends to be a nurse and saves the life of one of her own children. She falls ill, is recognised by Richard, but dies.

== Cast ==
- Ethel Jerdan
- Don McAlpine as Archibald Carlyle
- Hazel Stewart as Lady Isobel

== Production ==
Charles Hardy had worked in Australian films as an exhibitor and actor. The film was shot on location in Vaucluse, Sydney and in a studio at the Sydney Showground in early 1922.

== Reception ==
The film previewed in May but was not released until several months later. It was a big failure at the box-office. Hardy went on to work for Selznick Pictures as their Australian manager.
