= East Lynne =

1861 novel by Ellen Wood

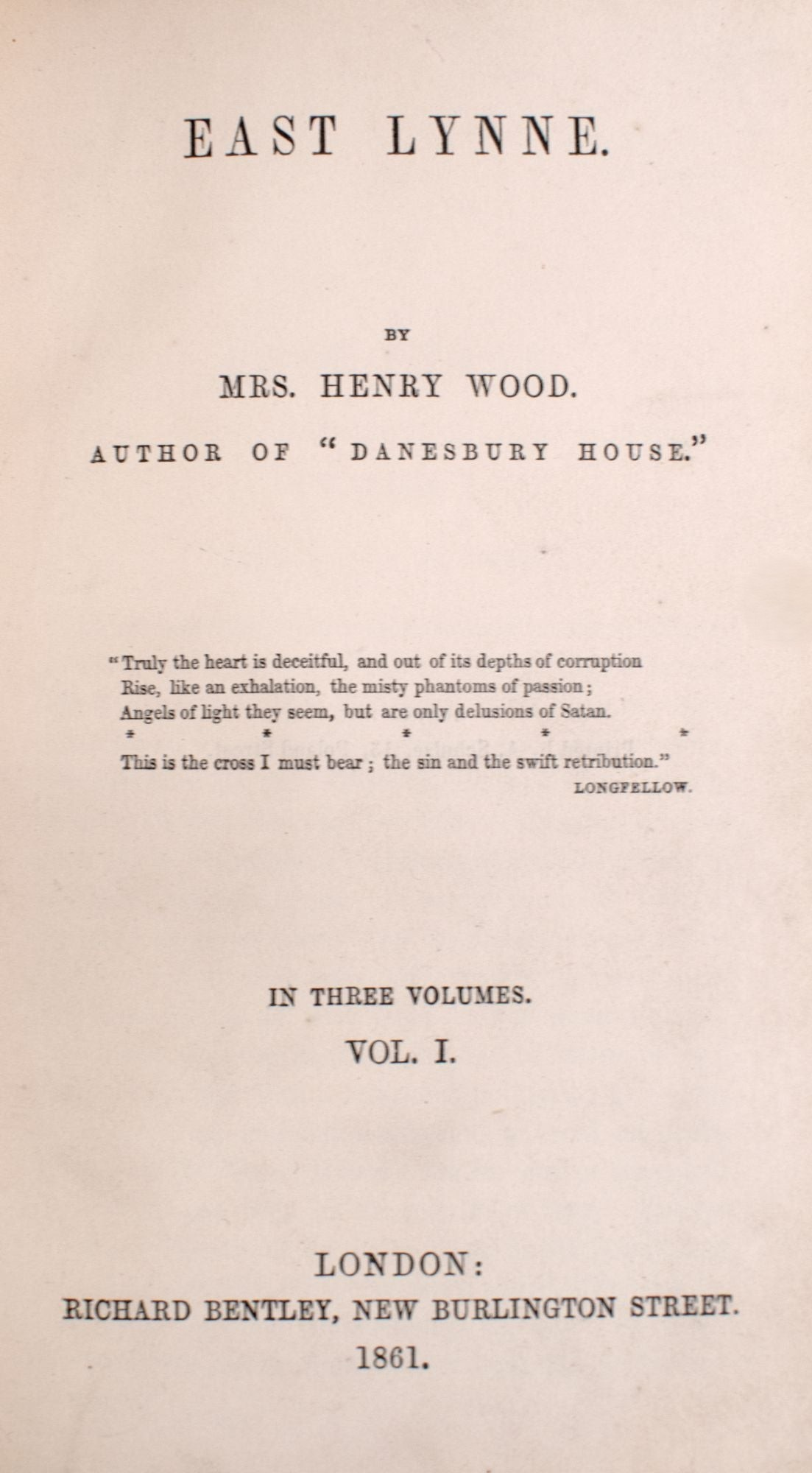
- First edition title page
- Author: Mrs. Henry Wood
- Language: English
- Genre: Sensation novel
- Publisher: Penn Publishing Company
- Publication date: 19 September 1861

East Lynne, or, The Earl's Daughter is an 1861 English sensation novel by Ellen Wood, writing as Mrs. Henry Wood. A Victorian-era bestseller, it is remembered chiefly for its elaborate and implausible plot centring on infidelity and double identities. There have been numerous stage and film adaptations.

The much-quoted line "Gone! And never called me mother!" (variant: "Dead! Dead! And never called me mother!") does not appear in the book; both variants come from later stage adaptations.

The book was originally serialised in The New Monthly Magazine between January 1860 and September 1861, and it was issued as a three-volume novel on 19 September 1861.

== Plot summary ==
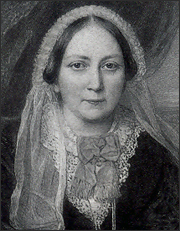
Portrait of Ellen Wood, author of East Lynne, by Reginald Easton

Lady Isabel Vane, a beautiful and refined young woman, is distraught when her beloved father dies suddenly. The earldom and all property are bequeathed to a distant relation, leaving Isabel homeless and penniless. With no other options, she marries hard-working lawyer Archibald Carlyle, who buys her former home, called East Lynne.

Carlyle's elder sister Cornelia comes to live at East Lynne. She hates the marriage and, by taking over the household, makes Isabel's life miserable. Carlyle, a kind man, had previously been friendly with a local lady, Barbara Hare, who had hoped to marry him. Suspicious of the relationship, Isabel leaves her husband and their infant children to elope with aristocratic but poor Captain Francis Levison. However, once abroad with Levison, Isabel realises he has no intention of marrying her even though she has borne their illegitimate child. He deserts her.

Isabel's cousin, Lord Mount Severn, visits her in Europe and offers to support her. She learns from him that her husband was not unfaithful. On her way back to England, there is a train accident, and Isabel's baby is killed and Isabel, badly injured, is reported dead. Isabel, in disguise and under a new name, takes the position of governess in the household of her former husband and his new wife (Barbara Hare), allowing her to be close to her children.

This situation becomes a source of great misery, however, as the little boy William dies of tuberculosis. Carlyle stands for Parliament, as does Sir Francis Levison, Isabel's seducer. It transpires that under the name Thorn, Levison had been guilty of the murder of a Mr. Hallijohn. But Richard Hare, the brother of Barbara, had been falsely accused of that murder and goes on the run.

When the facts eventually come to light, there is a dramatic trial involving Hallijohn's daughter Afy as a reluctant witness.

The pressure of maintaining a façade (wearing blue glasses, adopting a foreign accent) to disguise her identity and being constantly reminded that her husband has moved on physically weakens Isabel. On her deathbed, she tells all to Carlyle, who forgives her.

== Adaptations ==
There have been multiple adaptations for stage, radio, films and television.

East Lynne has been adapted for the stage many times; the play was so popular that stock companies performed the play whenever they needed guaranteed revenue. It became so common that theatres stuck with a badly received play would assuage audiences with the hopeful promise, "Next week, East Lynne!", which eventually became a catchphrase in comedies and cartoons, often as a sign outside a theatre. The play was staged so often that critic Sally Mitchell estimates that some version was seen by audiences in either England or North America every week for more than 40 years.

The "Next week, East Lynne!" catchphrase is mentioned in the 1936 film Libeled Lady in a scene with Jean Harlow and Spencer Tracy.

=== Stage adaptations ===
The novel was first staged as Edith, or The Earl's Daughter in New York in 1861 and under its own name on 26 January 1863 in Brooklyn; by March of that year, "three competing versions were drawing crowds to New York theaters." The most successful version was written by Clifton W. Tayleur for actress Lucille Western, who was paid $350 a night for her performance as Isabel Vane. Western starred in East Lynne for the next 10 years. At least nine adaptations were made in all, not including plays such as The Marriage Bells that "used a different title for the sake of some copyright protection." The work was revived on Broadway in 1926 in a production directed by James Light.

=== Film adaptations ===
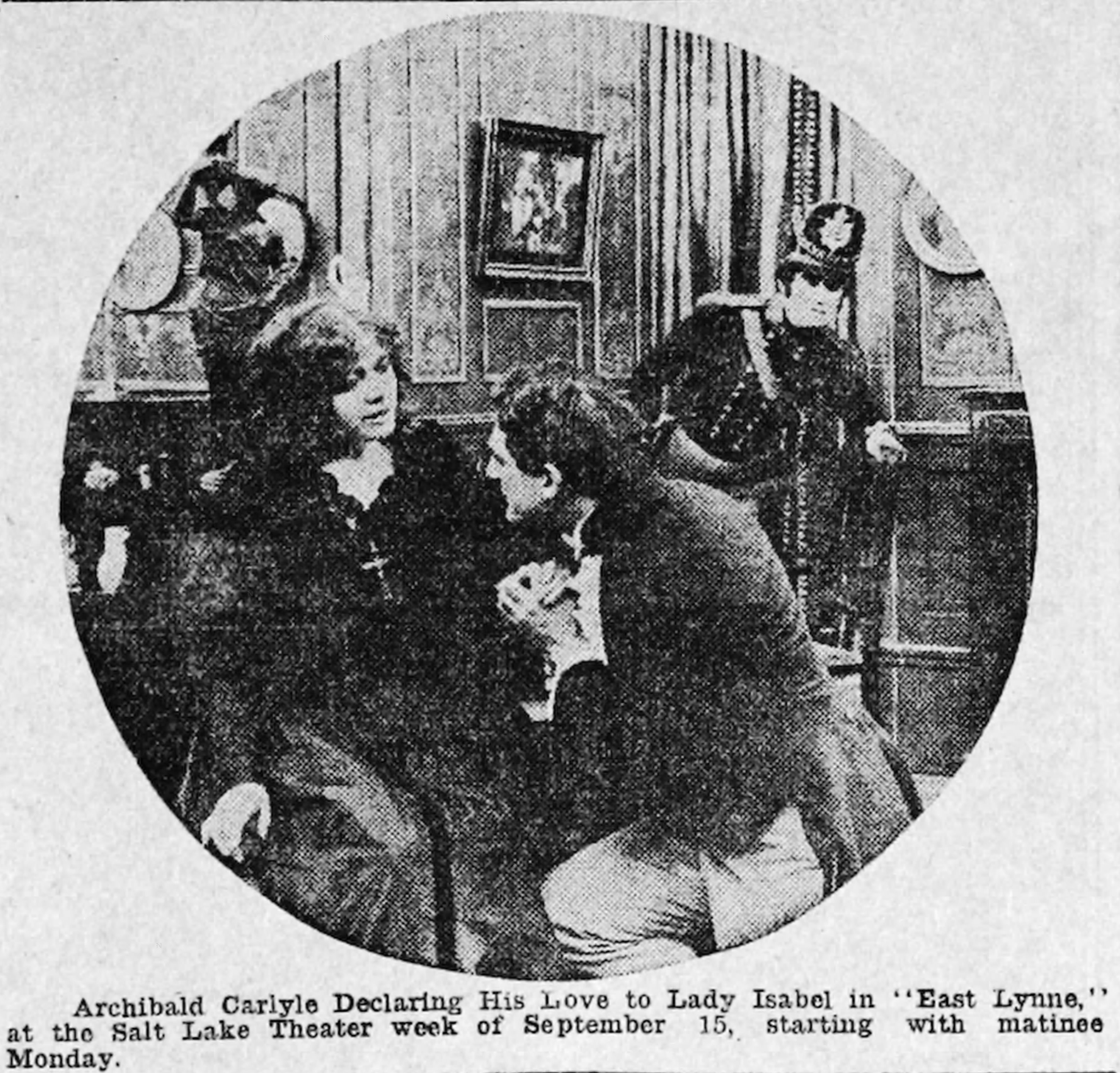
Newspaper clipping of 1913 adaptation

- East Lynne (1913)
- East Lynne (1916), starring Theda Bara
- East Lynne (1922), an Australian film directed by Charles Hardy
- East Lynne (1925), starred Alma Rubens, Edmund Lowe, Lou Tellegen and Leslie Fenton
- Ex-Flame (1930), starred Neil Hamilton and according to Leslie Halliwell in Halliwell's Film Guide was a modernised version and provided unintentional comedy. Halliwell quoted Variety's contemporary review of the film as "mush stuff for the women."
- East Lynne (1931) was nominated for the Academy Award for Best Picture in 1931. The film was adapted from the novel by Tom Barry and Bradley King and directed by Frank Lloyd. The film is a melodrama starring Ann Harding, Clive Brook, Conrad Nagel and Cecilia Loftus. Only one copy of the film is known to exist. The screenplay was in turn novelised by Arline de Haas.
- Thai Ullam (1952) is a Tamil language adaptation of East Lynne.

=== Television ===
In the 1970s, a TV dramatisation was broadcast from the City Varieties Theatre in Leeds, with the audience all in Victorian costume and Queen Victoria in the royal box. The famous TV host of The Good Old Days, Leonard Sachs, introduced the proceedings.

The story was filmed in 1982, in a BBC made-for-television production starring amongst Martin Shaw, Gemma Craven, Lisa Eichhorn, Jane Asher, Annette Crosbie and Tim Woodward.

=== Radio ===
A radio serial was produced in Australia in 1939 with Queenie Ashton (as Lady Isabel) and Ronald Morse (as Francis Levison).

A radio adaptation in seven parts was made for BBC Radio 4 by Michael Bakewell, with Rosemary Leach narrating as Mrs. Wood, first broadcast in 1987.

=== Other adaptations ===
As the more melodramatic aspects of the story became dated, several parodies were performed, including East Lynne in Bugville with Pearl White (1914), Mack Sennet's East Lynne with Variations (1917) and in 1931 the comedy East Lynne on the Western Front, in which British soldiers in World War I stage a burlesque version of the story.

== Critical assessment ==
Some argue that the novel champions middle classes over the lower orders; others, however, find this claim "too simplistic" and argue that the novel "highlights the shortfalls inherent to bourgeois masculinity." Sally Mitchell argues that the novel simultaneously upholds and undermines middle-class values.

Other critics include the late 19th century English novelist George Gissing, who read the book whilst staying in Rome in March 1898 and wrote in his diary that it was "not at all a bad book, of its sort." Perhaps the most practical assessment came from one who produced the play many times, actor and theater manager Tod Slaughter: "No other play in its time has ever been more maligned, more burlesqued, more ridiculed, or consistently made more money."

== Legacy ==
The town of East Lynne, Missouri, took its name from the novel.

In T. S. Eliot's Old Possum's Book of Practical Cats, and the subsequent Andrew Lloyd Webber musical Cats, Gus the Theatre Cat is mentioned as having 'once played a part in East Lynne'.
