= East Lynne (1916 film) =

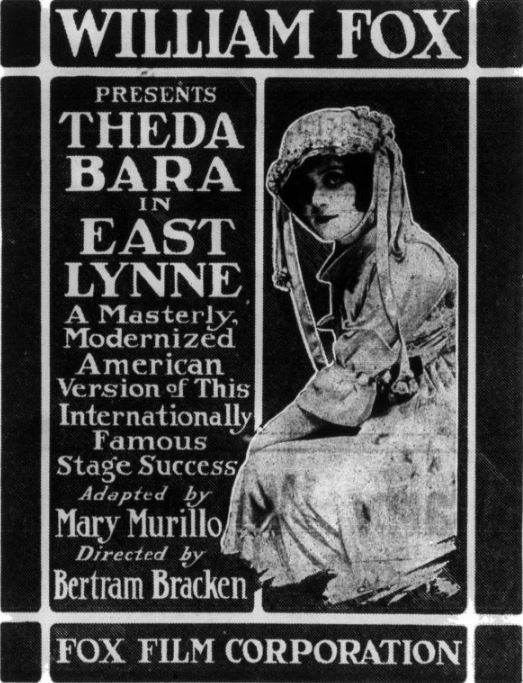
- Advertisement in the trade paper Variety
- Directed by: Bertram Bracken
- Written by: Mary Elizabeth Braddon; Mary Murillo (scenario)
- Based on: East Lynne (1861) by Mrs. Henry Wood
- Produced by: William Fox
- Starring: Theda Bara; Ben Deeley
- Cinematography: Rial Schellinger
- Distributed by: Fox Film Corporation
- Release date: June 19, 1916
- Running time: 75 minutes (5 reels)
- Country: United States
- Language: Silent (English intertitles)

East Lynne is a 1916 American silent drama film directed by Bertram Bracken, starring Theda Bara. Produced by Fox Film Corporation, it is an adaptation of the 1861 novel East Lynne by English author Mrs. Henry Wood. It was shot in Fort Lee, New Jersey. A 16mm print of the film was discovered in 1971 and purchased from Fox by the Museum of Modern Art where it is currently preserved. It is one of the few extant films of Theda Bara.

== Plot ==
The story follows the plight of Lady Isabel Carlisle, who is married to Archibald Carlyle and has two children. A villainous character, Captain Levison, manipulates her into believing her husband is unfaithful. Driven by mistaken reasons, she leaves her family. The train she is on subsequently crashes, and she is believed to have died in the wreck.

Having survived, she secretly returns to her former home in disguise (wearing a wig and sunglasses) and takes a job as the governess to her own children. The film explores themes of long-suffering and regret as she lives in the household unrecognized by her family.

== Cast ==
- Theda Bara as Lady Isabel Carlisle
- Ben Deeley as Archibald Carlisle
- Stuart Holmes as Captain Levison
- Claire Whitney as Barbara Hare
- William H. Tooker as Judge Hare, Barbara's Father
- Loel Steuart as Carlisle Child
- Eldean Stuart as Little William Carlisle
- Eugenie Woodward as Mrs. Hare
- Stanhope Wheatcroft as Richard Hare
- Emily Fitzroy as Cornelia

The film

== See also ==
- List of rediscovered films
