= The Channings (film) =

1920 British film by Edwin J. Collins

The Channings is a 1920 British silent crime film directed by Edwin J. Collins and starring Lionelle Howard, Dick Webb and Dorothy Moody. It was based on the 1862 novel The Channings by Ellen Wood.

== Cast ==
- Lionelle Howard as Arthur Channing
- Dick Webb as Hamish Channing
- Dorothy Moody as Constance Channing
- Cowley Wright as Roland Yorke
- Charles Vane as Huntley
- Frank Arlton as Galloway
