= The Channings (novel) =

1862 two-volume novel by Ellen Wood

- Author: Ellen Wood
- Language: English
- Publication date: 1862

The Channings is an 1862 two-volume novel by the British writer Ellen Wood. A man takes responsibility for a theft he believes his brother has committed. His brother is really innocent of the crime, and the real culprit is later caught.

In 1920, the novel was adapted into a silent film of the same name directed by Edwin J. Collins and starring Lionelle Howard and Dick Webb.
