= Ellen Wood (author) =

English novelist (1814–1887)

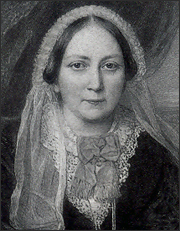
- Portrait by Reginald Easton
- Born: Ellen Price; 17 January 1814; Worcester, England
- Died: 10 February 1887 (aged 73); London, England
- Writing career
- Notable work: East Lynne (1861)

Signature
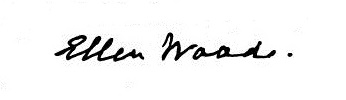

Ellen Wood (née Price; 17 January 1814 – 10 February 1887), better known as Mrs. Henry Wood, was an English novelist. She is best remembered for her 1861 novel East Lynne. Many of her books sold well internationally and were widely read in the United States. In her time, she surpassed Charles Dickens in fame in Australia.

== Life ==
Price was born in Worcester, on 17 January 1814. In 1836 she married Henry Wood, who worked in the banking and shipping trade in Dauphiné in the south of France, where they lived for 20 years. On the failure of Wood's business, the family (including four children) returned to England and settled in Upper Norwood near London, where Ellen Wood turned to writing. This supported the family. Henry Wood died in 1866. She wrote over 30 novels, many of which (especially East Lynne) enjoyed remarkable popularity. Among the best known are Danesbury House, Oswald Cray, Mrs. Halliburton's Troubles, The Channings, Lord Oakburn's Daughters and The Shadow of Ashlydyat. Her writing tone would be described as "conservative and Christian", occasionally expressing religious rhetoric.

In 1867, Wood purchased the English magazine Argosy, which had been founded by Alexander Strahan in 1865. She wrote much of the magazine herself, but other contributors included Hesba Stretton, Julia Kavanagh, Christina Rossetti, Sarah Doudney and Rosa Nouchette Carey. Wood continued as its editor until her death in 1887, when her son Charles Wood took over.

Wood's works were translated into many languages, including French and Russian. Leo Tolstoy, in a 9 March 1872 letter to his elder brother Sergei, noted that he was "reading Mrs. Wood's wonderful novel In the Maze".

Wood wrote several works of supernatural fiction, including "The Ghost" (1867) and the oft-anthologized "Reality or Delusion?" (1868).

She died of bronchitis.

== Works ==
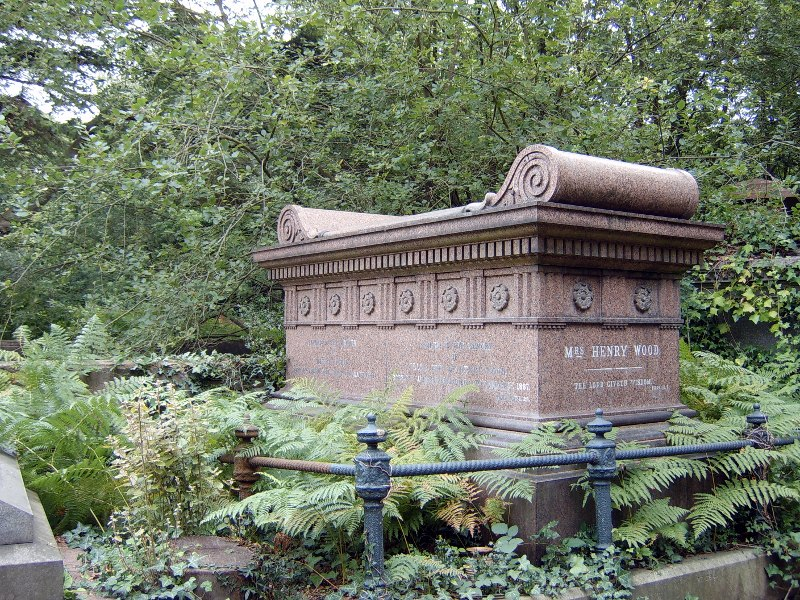
Mrs Henry Wood's tomb, Highgate Cemetery

These are the first published UK editions as catalogued by the British Library, with supplementary information from a specialist booksellers' catalogue.

- Danesbury House (1860)
- East Lynne (1861)
- The Elchester College Boys (1861)
- A Life's Secret (1862)
- The Shadow of Ashlydyat (1863)
- Verner's Pride (1863)
- Lord Oakburn's Daughters (1864)
- Oswald Cray (1864)
- Trevlyn Hold; or, Squire Trevlyn's Heir (1864)
- William Allair; or, Running away to Sea (1864)
- The Argosy (1865)
- Elster's Folly: A Novel (1866)
- St. Martin's Eve: A Novel (1866)
- Lady Adelaide's Oath (1867)
- Orville College: A Story (1867)
- The Ghost of the Hollow Field (1867)
- Castle Wafer; or, The Plain Gold Ring (1868)
- Bessy Rane: A Novel (1870)
- Within the Maze: A Novel (1872)
- The Master of Greylands (1872)
- Bessy Wells (1875)
- Edina (1876)
- Our Children (1876)
- Pomeroy Abbey (1878)
- Lady Adelaide (1879)
- Court Netherleigh: A Novel (1881)
- About Ourselves (1883)
- The Story of Charles Strange (1888)
- The House of Halliwell. A Novel (1890)

=== Series ===
==== The Channings Trilogy ====
1. The Channings (1862)
2. Roland Yorke: A Novel (1869)
3. Adam Grainger: A Tale (1876)

==== Helstonleigh ====
- Mrs. Halliburton's Troubles (1862)
- Mildred Arkell: A Novel (1865)
- Dene Hollow (1871)

==== The Offord Mystery ====
1. The Foggy Night at Offord: A Christmas Gift for the Lancashire Fund (1863)
2. The Red Court Farm: A Novel (1868)

==== Edwin Barley ====
1. Anne Hereford: A Novel (1868)
2. George Canterbury's Will (1870)

==== Johnny Ludlow ====
1. Johnny Ludlow (1874)
2. Johnny Ludlow, Second Series (1880)
3. Johnny Ludlow. Third Series (1885)
4. Featherston's Story. A Tale by Johnny Ludlow (1889)
5. Johnny Ludlow. Fifth series (1899)
6. Johnny Ludlow. Sixth series (1899)

=== Short Story Collections ===
- Told in the Twilight: Containing "Parkwater" and 9 shorter stories (1875)
- Parkwater: With 4 other tales (1876)
- A Tale of Sin and Other Tales (1881)
- Lady Grace and Other Stories (1887)
- The Unholy Wish and Other Stories (1890)
- Ashley and Other Stories (1897)

=== Some translations of her novels ===
- Les Channing. Traduit de l'Anglais par Mme Abric-Encontre (1864)
- Les Filles de Lord Oakburn: Roman traduit de l'anglais par L. Bochet (1876)
- La Gloire des Verner: Roman traduit de l'anglais par L. de L'Estrive (1878)
- Le Serment de Lady Adelaïde: Roman traduit de l'anglais par Léon Bochet (1878)
