= None So Blind (1923 film) =

1923 film directed by Burton King

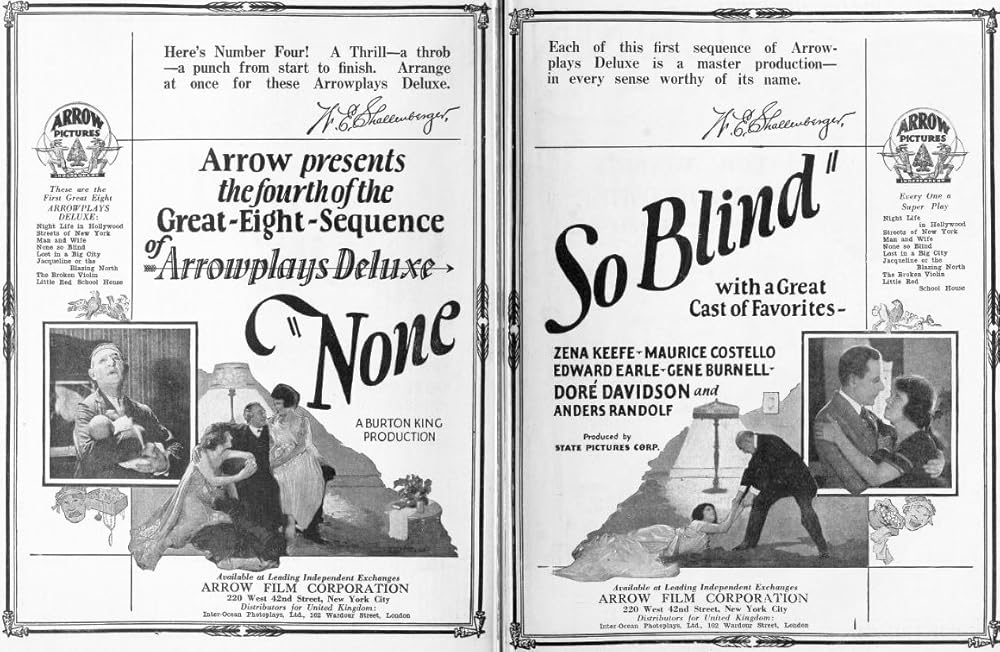
- Directed by: Burton L. King
- Written by: Leota Morgan; Kathleen Kerrigan
- Starring: Dore Davidson; Zena Keefe; Anders Randolph
- Cinematography: Alfred Ortlieb
- Production company: State Pictures
- Distributed by: Arrow Film Corporation
- Release date: February 19, 1923 (US)
- Running time: 6 reels
- Country: United States
- Language: English

None So Blind is a 1923 American silent drama film directed by Burton L. King and written by Leota Morgan and Kathleen Kerrigan. The film stars Dore Davidson, Zena Keefe, and Anders Randolph. A print of None So Blind exists.

== Cast list ==
- Dore Davidson as Aaron Abrams
- Zena Keefe as Rachel Abrams Mortimer/Ruth
- Anders Randolph as Roger Mortimer
- Edward Earle as Sheldon Sherman
- Sonia Nodell as Rebecca
- Bernard Siegel as Saul Cohen
- Robert Bentley as Louis Cohen
- Maurice Costello as Russell Mortimer
- Gene Burnell as Hazel Mortimer
