= Leota Morgan =

American screenwriter and playwright

- Born: Leota Statten Morgan; February 7, 1896; Joplin, Missouri, USA
- Died: January 23, 1943 (aged 46); Manhattan, New York, USA
- Occupations: Screenwriter, author
- Spouse: Edward Davis Boehm

Leota Morgan (sometimes credited as Leota Statten Morgan or Leota Morgan Boehm) was an American screenwriter, playwright, and writer. She was born in Missouri to Samuel Morgan and Della Quinn.

== Selected works ==
Films:

- The Phantom of the Turf (1928)
- Heroes in Blue (1927)
- A Light in the Window (1927)
- The Truth About Women (1924)
- Gambling Wives (1924)
- The Empty Cradle (1923)
- Man and Wife (1923)
- None So Blind (1923)
- The Streets of New York (1922)
- White Hell (1922)
- Common Sense (1920)

Plays:

- The 11th Woman
- The Streets of New York
- Banks of the Hudson
- Tiger-Dove

Novels:

- Cheating Wives
