= Sherlock Holmes (1922 film) =

1922 American silent mystery drama film by Albert Parker

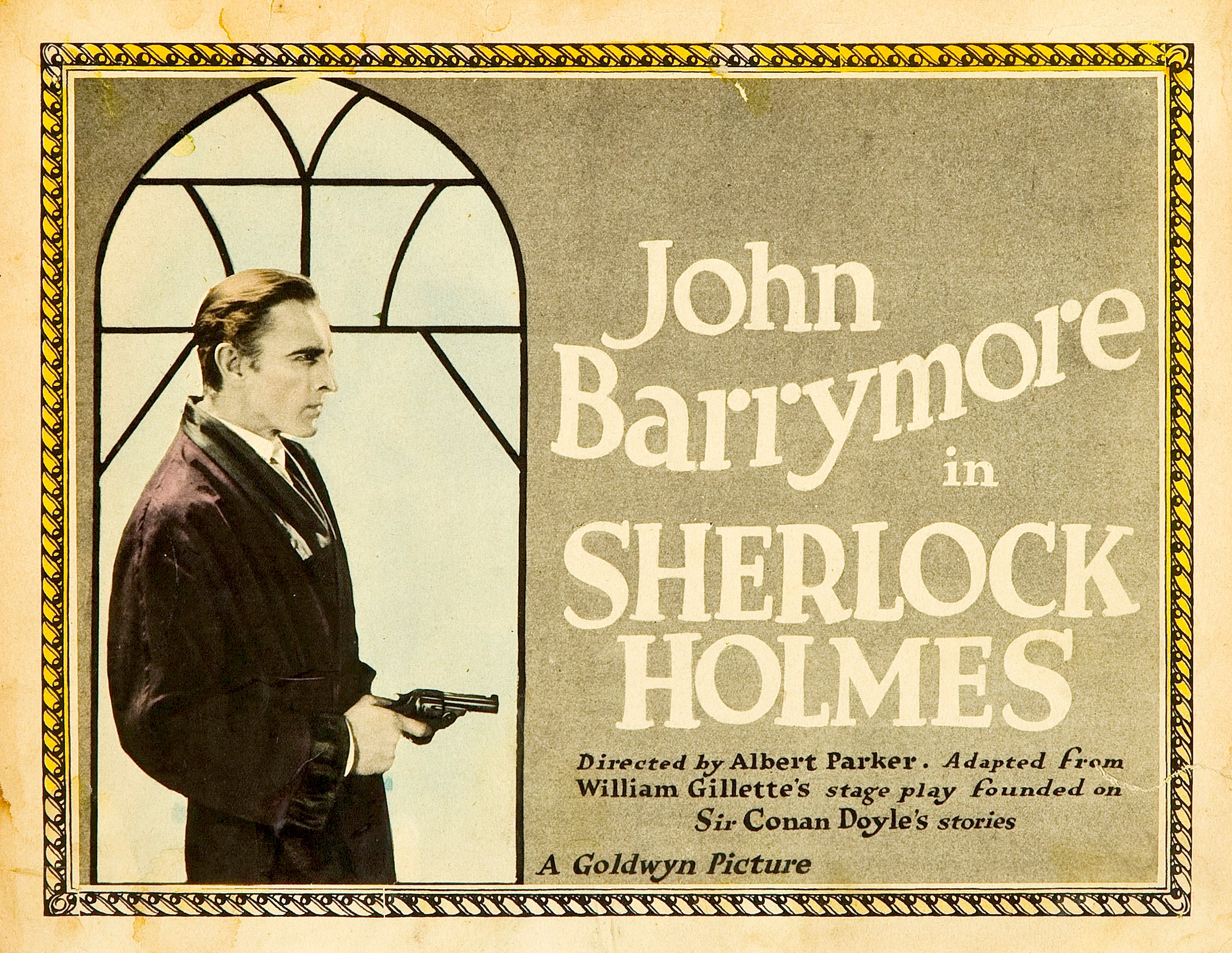
- 1922 lobby card
- Directed by: Albert Parker
- Written by: Earle Browne; Marion Fairfax
- Based on: Sherlock Holmes by William Gillette and Arthur Conan Doyle
- Produced by: F.J. Godsol
- Starring: John Barrymore; Roland Young; Anders Randolph; William Powell; Hedda Hopper
- Cinematography: J. Roy Hunt
- Distributed by: Goldwyn Pictures
- Release date: May 1, 1922
- Running time: 85 minutes 136 1/2 minutes (1922 original)
- Country: United States
- Language: Silent (English intertitles)

Sherlock Holmes, Length: 1h 25min 28s

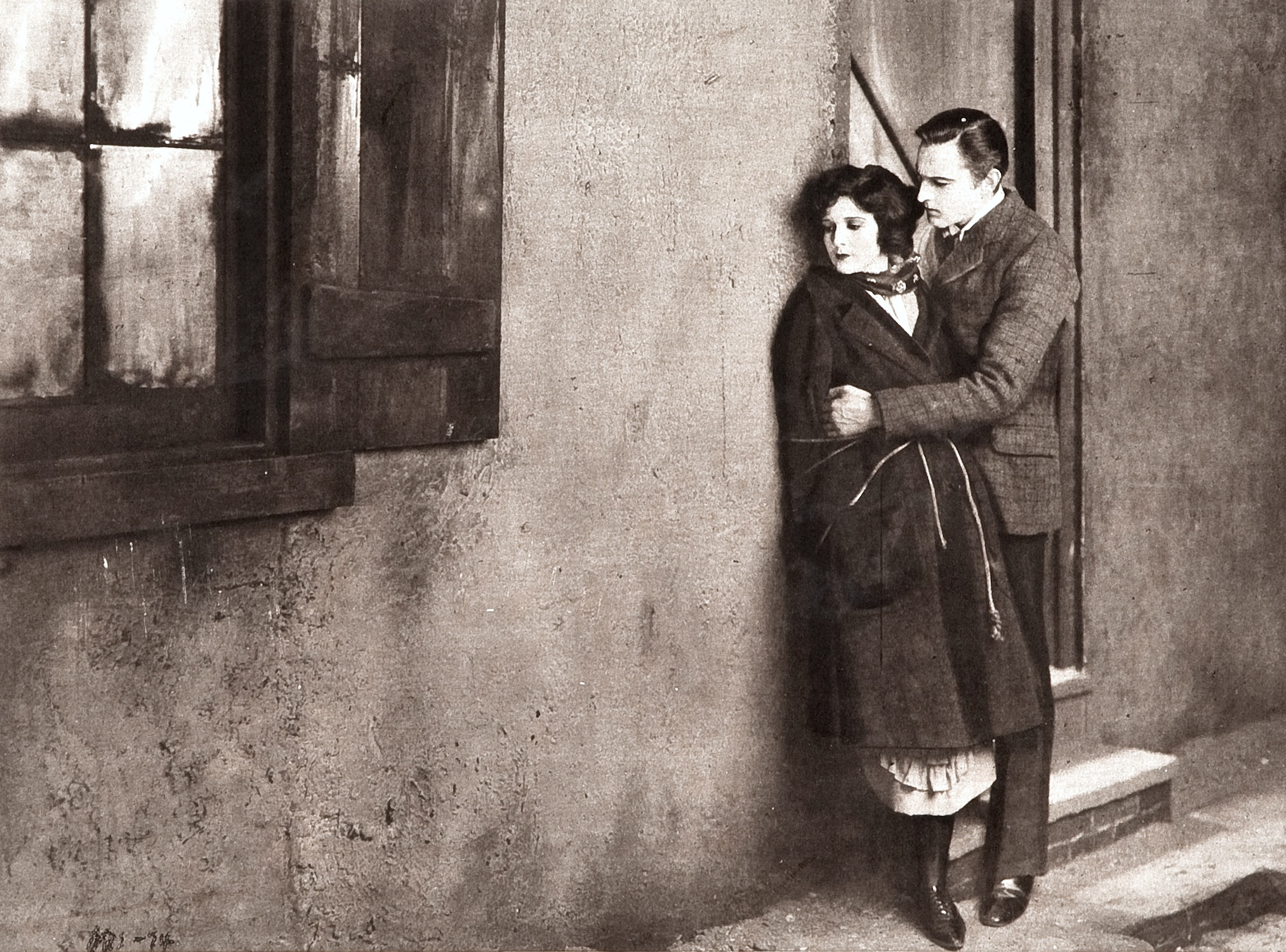
Scene from the film.

Sherlock Holmes (released as Moriarty in the UK) is a 1922 American silent mystery drama film starring John Barrymore as Sherlock Holmes, Roland Young as Dr. John Watson and Gustav von Seyffertitz as Moriarty.

The movie, which features the screen debuts of both William Powell (credited as William H. Powell) and Roland Young, was directed by Albert Parker. It was written by Earle Browne and Marion Fairfax from the 1899 play by William Gillette and Arthur Conan Doyle based upon Doyle's characters, and was produced by Goldwyn Pictures Corporation.

The film was considered lost for decades, but was rediscovered in the mid-1970s and restored by George Eastman House.

== Plot ==
Cambridge student Prince Alexis is accused of stealing the athletic funds. Friend and fellow student Watson recommends he seek the assistance of classmate Sherlock Holmes. Meanwhile, while honing his observational skills out in the countryside, Holmes falls and is knocked unconscious. A young woman passerby, Alice Faulkner, comes to his aid, much to his delight.

Holmes accepts the case, and soon has a suspect, Forman Wells. Wells eventually confesses he took the money to try to get away from Moriarty; Wells is actually the son of a crook being groomed by the criminal mastermind for some later scheme. Fascinated, Holmes meets Moriarty face to face, impudently asking to study him, but of course Moriarty refuses to cooperate. Holmes informs Watson he has found his mission in life: to stop Moriarty.

Meanwhile, Alexis's uncle, Count von Stalburg, arrives with important news: both his brothers have been killed in a "motor accident". He is now the Crown Prince, and as such, cannot marry Rose Faulkner, Alice's sister. Heartbroken, Rose commits suicide.

Years pass. Holmes is praised in a newspaper for solving a mystery that baffled Scotland Yard. His investigative skills have failed to locate Alice Faulkner, but their paths do cross again. Moriarty is after Rose Faulkner's love letters from the Prince for blackmail. He has had her destitute sister Alice hired as a secretary by "G. Neville Chetwood", actually a henchman named James Larrabee. When the Prince asks Holmes to take the case, he initially refuses, as he holds the Prince responsible for Rose's death, but changes his mind when he learns that Alice is involved.

Holmes has Forman Wells infiltrate the Larrabee household as the new butler. Through trickery, Holmes gets Alice to reveal where she has hidden the letters, but oddly, once he has them in his hands, returns them to her, even though she intends to publish them to avenge her sister. He informs Watson that the letters will be the bait to lure Moriarty out of his lair.

For his part, Moriarty has become frustrated at being driven further and further underground by Holmes' relentless pursuit of him. He has Alice brought to a "gas chamber" (where he has disposed of others). Holmes walks knowingly into the trap, but manages to rescue Alice anyway.

Moriarty then sets his entire vast organization in motion to try to kill his nemesis. Holmes is up to the challenge, however. Most of Moriarty's henchmen are captured by the police, and when Moriarty comes in person (in disguise) to do the job, Holmes nabs him too. Holmes then plans his honeymoon with Alice.

== Cast ==
- John Barrymore as Sherlock Holmes
- Roland Young as Dr. John Watson
- Carol Dempster as Alice Faulkner
- Gustav von Seyffertitz as Professor Moriarty
- Louis Wolheim as Craigin
- Percy Knight as Sid Jones
- William H. Powell as Forman Wells
- Hedda Hopper as Madge Larrabee
- Peggy Bayfield as Rose Faulkner
- Margaret Kemp as Therese
- Anders Randolf as James Larrabee
- Robert Schable as Alf Bassick
- Reginald Denny as Prince Alexis
- David Torrence as Count von Stalburg
- Robert Fischer as Otto, the Prince's valet and Moriarty's secret underling
- Lumsden Hare as Dr. Leighton
- Jerry Devine as Billy
- John Willard as Inspector Gregson
- Walter Kingsford as Gunman in apartment (uncredited)

== Restoration ==
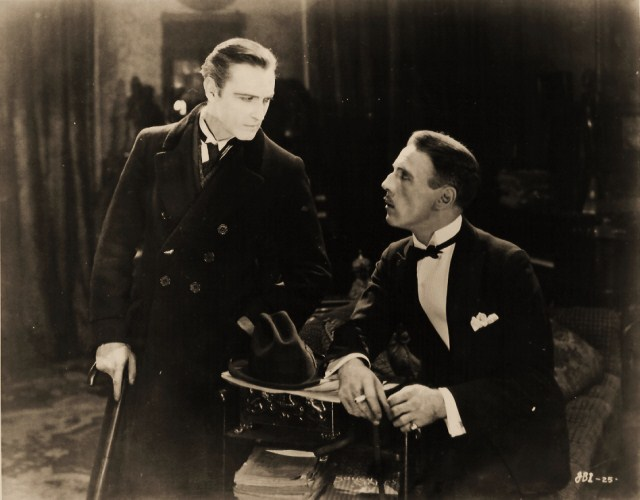
John Barrymore and Roland Young

Material held by Eastman House was the basis for a reconstruction produced by Kevin Brownlow and William K. Everson (aided in the early stages by director Albert Parker himself, then in his late 80s), with a second reconstruction (incorporating newly found elements) undertaken by Eastman House itself in 2001. Describing the first reconstruction attempt in 1975, Everson made it clear that reassembling the available material into a viewable form was a far from trivial task: "A few years ago all that existed of this film were rolls and rolls of negative sections, in which every take—not every sequence, but every take—were [sic] jumbled out of order, with only a few flash titles (Note: "When the titles were made locally, the films were exported with flash titles, titles of just a few frames, and the distributor could insert the [translated] titles on the place where the flash title appeared." Read, Paul, ed. (2000). Restoration of Motion Picture Film. Butterworth-Heinemann. p. 73.) for guidance [...] and a script that in many ways differed from the play, adding to the herculean task of putting it all together."

The 2001 reconstruction was released on DVD by Kino International in 2009, with about 26 minutes of footage still missing. A Kino Blu-ray release followed in December 2011.

== See also ==
- List of rediscovered films
