= Heroes in Blue (1927 film) =

1927 film

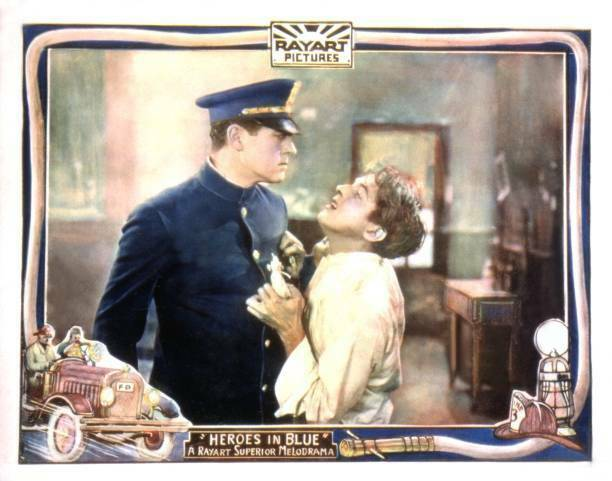
- Directed by: Duke Worne
- Written by: Leota Morgan; George W. Pyper
- Produced by: W. Ray Johnston
- Starring: John Bowers; Sally Rand; Gareth Hughes
- Cinematography: Walter L. Griffin
- Production company: Duke Worne Productions
- Distributed by: Rayart Pictures
- Release date: November 1927
- Running time: 50 minutes
- Country: United States
- Languages: Silent; English intertitles

Heroes in Blue is a 1927 American silent drama film directed by Duke Worne and starring John Bowers, Sally Rand and Gareth Hughes.

The film focuses on two rival families, the Kellys and the Dugans. Bob Kelly is a policeman like his father, while Anne Dugan's brother is a criminal who commits arson as a cover for robberies.

== Cast ==
- John Bowers as Bob Kelly
- Sally Rand as Anne Dugan
- Gareth Hughes as Tom Dugan
- George Bunny as Mr. Dugan
- Barney Gilmore as Pat Kelly
- Ann Brody
- Lydia Yeamans Titus

== Bibliography ==
- Munden, Kenneth White. The American Film Institute Catalog of Motion Pictures Produced in the United States, Part 1. University of California Press, 1997.
