= Anders Randolf =

Danish-American actor (1870–1930)

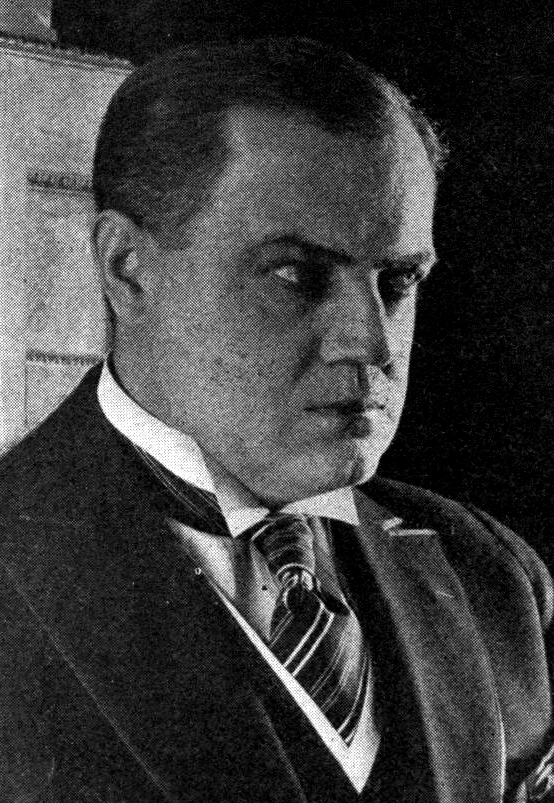
- Randolf in 1921
- Born: December 18, 1870; Viborg, Denmark
- Died: July 2, 1930 (aged 59); Hollywood, California, U.S.
- Resting place: Frederiksberg Cemetery, Copenhagen
- Other name: Anders Randolph
- Occupation: Actor
- Years active: 1913–1930
- Spouse: Dorthea Jorgensen (m. ?–1930)

Anders Randolf (December 18, 1870 – July 2, 1930) was a Danish-American actor in American films from 1913 to 1930.

== Early biography ==
Randolf was born in Viborg, Denmark on December 18, 1870. As a youth, he attended a military academy, graduated Maitre d'Arms and served with the Royal Danish Hussars, earning a reputation as a world-class swordsman.

Randolf emigrated to the United States in 1893 and joined the U.S. Army, serving with the 17th US Infantry.

== Stage career ==
Harboring a lifelong passion for the theater, Randolf performed with an acting troupe in Columbus, Ohio before joining a number of touring companies including William Farnum All-Star Company and the Vaughan Glaser Company. He co-starred in a highly regarded production of As You Like It (1599) opposite Henrietta Crosman.

== Film career ==
Fairbanks and Randolf in the final sword duel sequence of The Black Pirate

In 1914, Anders Randolf began appearing in 1- or 2-reelers with the Vitagraph Studios stock company, and earned critical praise in his first feature film The Wheels of Justice (1915) in the role of Tug' Riley, a convict. A reviewer in the New York Dramatic Mirror wrote: "Anders Randolf as Tug Riley is undoubtedly the most real in the excellent cast."

Randolf continued working with Vitagraph until 1919 even as the production company's fortunes declined. The company was acquired by Warner Bros. studios in 1925. As a freelance performer, Rudolf was provided with "top supporting roles" in high production features. He worked for Cosmopolitan productions, co-starring with Marion Davies in The Cinema Murder (1919), Buried Treasure (1921), and Enchantment. Regarded as "one of Hollywood's most respected heavies", he was often cast to play villains. A versatile actor, Randolf could expertly play comedic roles, for example, as a incompetent banker in In Hollywood with Potash and Perlmutter (1923); and Mary Pickford's father in Dorothy Vernon of Haddon Hall (1924).

At the pinnacle of his career, the 50-year-old Randolf was cast as the pirate captain in The Black Pirate (1924), a swashbuckler starring Douglas Fairbanks. His outstanding skills as a swordsman were on display in the final duel sequence. Critic Mordaunt Hall in the New York Times congratulated Randolf on his "cunning and brutal" interpretation of the role.

== Late career and death ==
Randolf's health was in decline in the late 1920s, but his work schedule did not slacken. His transition to sound films in a number of Warner Bros. productions in 1929 and 1930 were untroubled, as Randolf carried little trace of a Danish accent. His later film appearances were in comedy shorts: Charley Chase's The Snappy Sneezer (1929), Laurel and Hardy's The Night Owls (1930) and Joe E. Brown's Maybe It's Love (1930). His final films, Going Wild (1931) and West of the Rockies (1931), were released posthumously.

Randolf died on July 3, 1930, following a relapse after a kidney operation. He was interred at Frederiksberg Cemetery in Copenhagen.

== Selected filmography ==
- The Prisoner of Zenda (1913) - One of Black Michael's Conspirators
- The Man That Might Have Been (1914, Short) - Kittredge
- Hearts and the Highway (1915) - Chief Justice of Scotland
- The Wheels of Justice (1915) - 'Tug' Riley, a Convict
- The Goddess (1915) - Sweetzer
- The Crown Prince's Double (1915) - Baron Hagar
- The Island of Surprise (1916) - Daniel Casselis
- The Hero of Submarine D-2 (1916) - J.F. Austin
- The Vital Question (1916) - Peter Worden
- The Suspect (1916) - Duke Karatoff
- The Daring of Diana (1916) - Stange
- The Girl Philippa (1916) - Wildresse
- The Courage of Silence (1917) - Spanish Ambassador
- Within the Law (1917) - Mr. Gilder
- One Law for Both (1917) - The Governor
- Sins of Ambition (1917) - Charles Prescott
- Who's Your Neighbor? (1917) - Bryant M. Harding
- Daughter of Destiny (1917) - Franz Jorn
- The Belgian (1918) - Berger
- The Splendid Sinner (1918) - Rudolph Von Zorn
- The Safety Curtain (1918) - Vulcan
- The Lion and the Mouse (1919) - John Burkett Ryder
- Reclaimed: The Struggle for a Soul Between Love and Hate (1919) - Mark Sinister
- The Price of Innocence (1919) - George Greyson
- The Third Degree (1919) - Howard Jeffries Sr
- Too Many Crooks (1919) - Frisco Jimmy
- Erstwhile Susan (1919) - Barnaby Dreary
- The Cinema Murder (1919) - Sylvanus Power
- The Idol Dancer (1920) - The Blackbirder
- Madonnas and Men (1920) - Turnerius / Marshall Turner
- The Common Sin (1920) - John Davis Warren
- The Love Flower (1920) - Matthew Crane
- Buried Treasure (1921) - William Vandermuellen
- Jim the Penman (1921) - Baron Hartfeld
- Peacock Alley (1922) - Hugo Fenton
- Sherlock Holmes (1922) - James Larrabee
- The Referee (1922) - Steve Roberts
- Silas Marner (1922) - Squire Cass
- Slim Shoulders (1922) - Edward Langden
- Notoriety (1922) - Theatrical Agent
- The Streets of New York (1922) - Gideon Bloodgood
- The Man from Glengarry (1922) - Big MacDonald
- Mighty Lak' a Rose (1923) - 'Bull' Morgan
- None So Blind (1923) - Roger Mortimer
- The Bright Shawl (1923) - Capt. Cesar Y Santacilla
- The Eternal Struggle (1923) - Capt. Jack Scott
- By Divine Right (1924) - Trent
- Dorothy Vernon of Haddon Hall (1924) - Sir George Vernon
- Behold This Woman (1924) - Stephen Strangeway
- In Hollywood with Potash and Perlmutter (1924) - Blanchard
- Madonna of the Streets (1924) - 'Bull' Morgan
- Her Market Value (1925) - Cyrus Hamilton
- The Happy Warrior (1925) - Stingo Hannaford
- Souls for Sables (1925) - Harrison Morrill
- Seven Keys to Baldpate (1925) - J.K. Norton
- The Johnstown Flood (1926) - John Hamilton, Lumber Camp Boss
- The Black Pirate (1926) - Pirate Captain
- Ranson's Folly (1926) - The Post Trader
- Miss Nobody (1926) - J.B. Hardiman
- Broken Hearts of Hollywood (1926) - District Attorney
- Womanpower (1926) - Bromley Sr.
- The Silent Flyer (1926, Serial) - Benjamin Darrell
- The Tender Hour (1927)
- Sinews of Steel (1927)
- Dearie (1927)
- Old San Francisco (1927)
- The First Auto (1927)
- The Jazz Singer (1927)
- The College Widow (1927)
- Powder My Back (1928)
- The Crimson City (1928)
- Women They Talk About (1928)
- Me, Gangster (1928)
- Three Sinners (1928)
- The Power of Silence (1928)
- 4 Devils (1928)
- Noah's Ark (1928)
- The Viking (1928)
- Sin Sister (1929)
- Wrong Again (1929)
- Shanghai Lady (1929)
- All Faces West (1929)
- The Kiss (1929)
- Young Nowheres (1929)
- The Show of Shows (1929)
- The Way of All Men (1930)
- Night Owls (1930)
- Son of the Gods (1930)
