= Hedda Hopper =

American gossip columnist and actress (1885–1966)

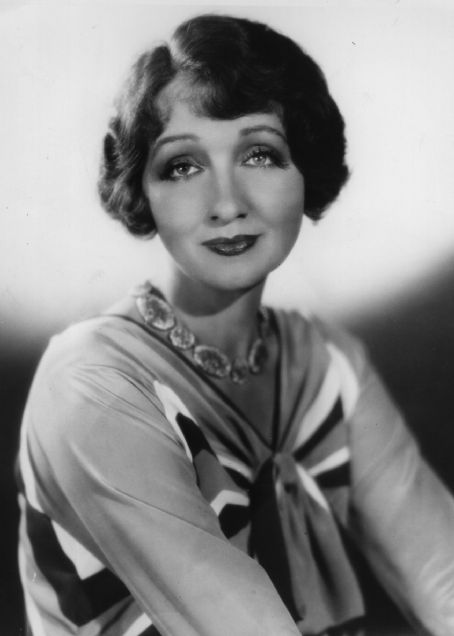
- Hopper in 1930
- Born: Elda Furry; June 2, 1885; Hollidaysburg, Pennsylvania, U.S.
- Died: February 1, 1966 (aged 80); Los Angeles, California, U.S.
- Resting place: Rose Hill Cemetery in Altoona, Pennsylvania
- Occupations: Actress, gossip columnist
- Years active: 1908–1966
- Known for: Writing "Hedda Hopper's Hollywood"
- Political party: Republican
- Spouse: DeWolf Hopper (m. 1913; div. 1922)
- Children: William Hopper

Elda Furry (June 2, 1885 – February 1, 1966), known professionally as Hedda Hopper, was an American gossip columnist and actress. At the height of her influence in the 1940s, more than 35 million people read her columns. A strong supporter of the House Un-American Activities Committee (HUAC) hearings, Hopper named suspected Communists and was a major proponent of the Hollywood blacklist. Hopper continued to write her gossip column until her death in 1966. Her work appeared in many magazines and later on radio. She had an extended public feud with Louella Parsons, an arch-rival and fellow gossip columnist.

== Early life ==
Hopper was born Elda Furry in Hollidaysburg, Pennsylvania, the daughter of Margaret (née Miller; 1856–1941) and David Furry, a butcher, both members of the German Baptist Brethren. Her family was of Pennsylvania Dutch (German) descent. The family moved to Altoona when Elda was three.

== Career ==
=== Acting ===
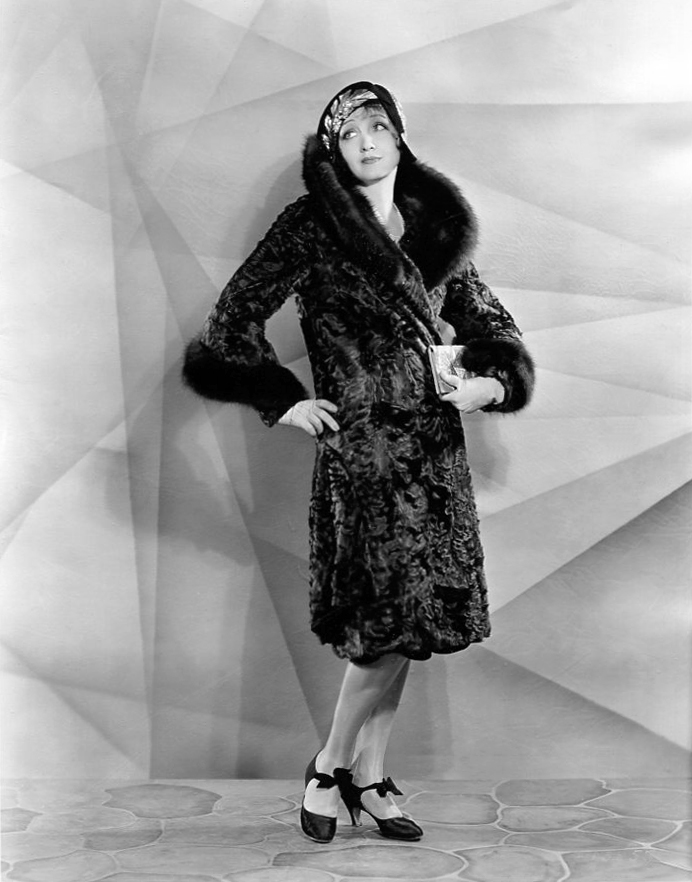
Hopper in 1929

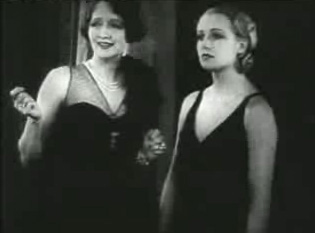
Hopper and Carole Lombard in The Racketeer (1929)

She eventually ran away to New York City and began her career in the chorus on the Broadway stage. Hopper was not successful in this venture. Florenz Ziegfeld called the aspiring starlet a "clumsy cow" and brushed off her pleas for a slot in his lavish Follies. After a few years, she joined the theater company of matinee idol DeWolf Hopper, whom she called "Wolfie" and would later marry.

She remained in the chorus and they toured the country. While in the Hopper company, she realized that chorus and understudy jobs were not acting. She wanted to act, and she knew she would have to prove herself before she could hope to get anywhere in the theater. Hearing that Edgar Selwyn was casting his play The Country Boy for a road tour, she went to his office and talked him into letting her audition for the lead. She was given the role and that show toured for thirty-five weeks through forty-eight states. She studied singing during the summer and, in the fall, toured with The Quaker Girl in the second lead, the prima donna role. The show closed in Albany, New York.

In 1913, she became the fifth wife of DeWolf Hopper, whose previous wives were named Ella, Ida, Edna and Nella. The similarity in names caused some friction, as he would sometimes call Elda by the name of one of his former wives. Consequently, Elda Hopper paid a numerologist $10 to tell her what name she should use, and the answer was "Hedda". She began acting in silent movies in 1915. Her motion picture debut was in The Battle of Hearts (1916) with William Farnum, but she made a major splash in Virtuous Wives (1918), in which she established her pattern of playing society women. Hopper decided to upstage the film's headline starlet, Anita Stewart, by spending all of her $5,000 salary on a lavish wardrobe from the upscale boutique Lucile, which she wore in the film. By 1920, she was commanding $1,000 per week as a free agent in New York; in 1923 she moved to Hollywood and became a contract player for Louis B. Mayer Pictures. She appeared in more than 120 movies over her 23-year acting career.

=== Writing ===
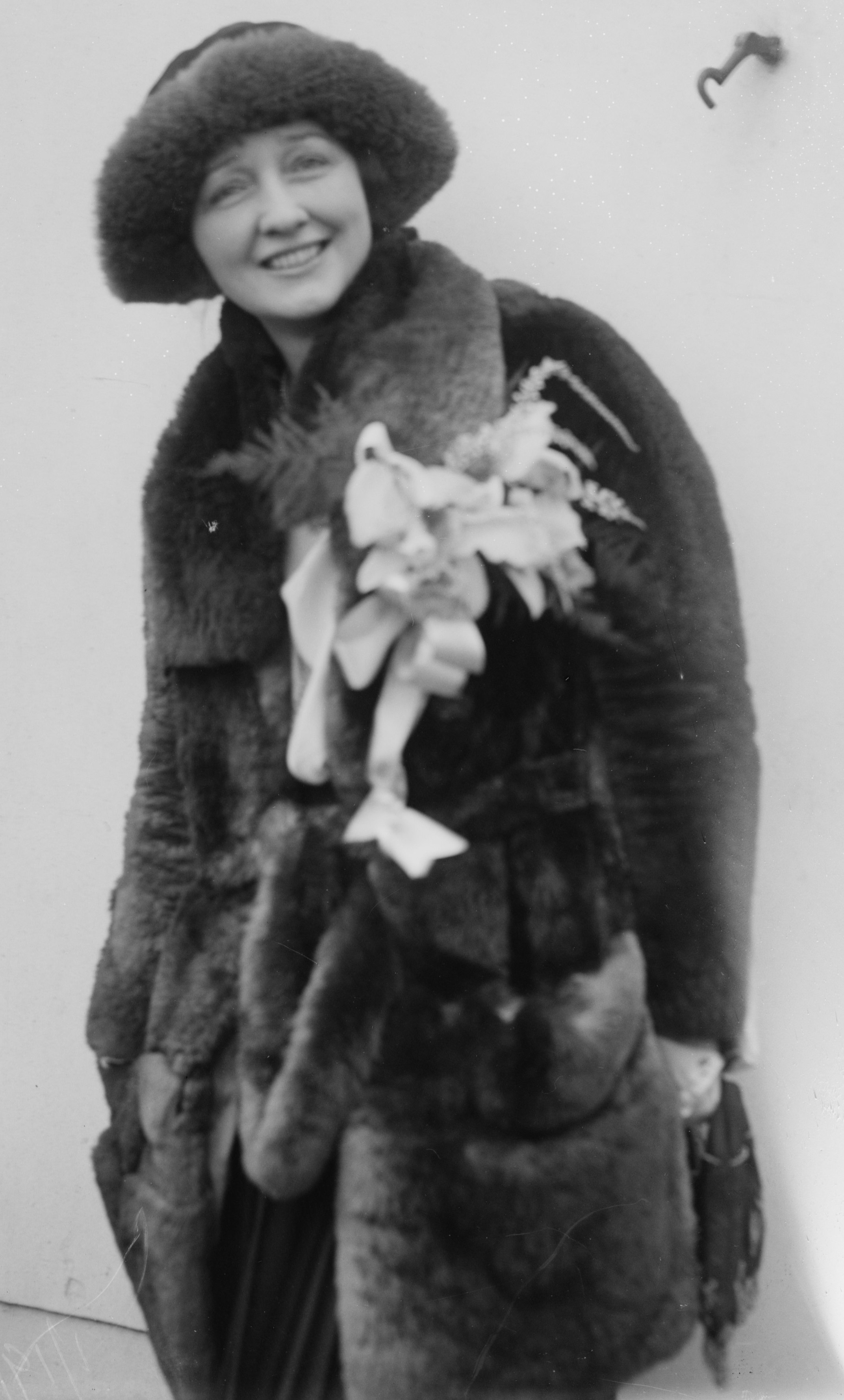
Hopper in the early 1920s

As Hopper's movie career waned in the mid-1930s, she looked for other sources of income. In 1935, she agreed to write a weekly Hollywood gossip column for The Washington Herald at $50 a week (equivalent to $1,174 in 2025), which was cancelled after four months when she refused to take a $15 pay cut. In 1937, Hopper was offered another gossip column opportunity, this time with the Los Angeles Times. Her column, entitled "Hedda Hopper's Hollywood", debuted on February 14, 1938. Hopper could not type, nor spell very well, so she dictated her column to a typist over the phone. Hopper used her extensive contacts forged during her acting days to gather material for her column. Her first major scoop had national implications: in 1939, Hopper printed that President Franklin Roosevelt's son James Roosevelt was divorcing his wife Betsey after being caught in an affair with a nurse at the Mayo Clinic.

Part of Hopper's public image was her fondness for wearing extravagant hats, for which the Internal Revenue Service allowed her a $5,000 annual tax deduction as a work expense. During the Second World War, the Nazis used photographs of Hopper in her extravagant hats for propaganda, as a symbol of "American decadence". Her annual income was $250,000, enabling her to live a luxurious lifestyle and maintain a mansion in Beverly Hills, which she described as "the house that fear built".

After Hopper printed a story about an extramarital affair between Joseph Cotten and Deanna Durbin, Cotten ran into Hopper at a social event and pulled out her chair, only to continue pulling it out from under her when she sat down and then kick her in the rear. The next day, he received dozens of flower bouquet deliveries and congratulatory telegrams from others in the industry, thanking him for having the courage to do what everyone else dreamed of doing. Cotten later threatened Hopper that he would kick her again if she kept slandering him.

Hopper spread rumors that Michael Wilding and Stewart Granger had a sexual relationship. Her 1962 book The Whole Truth and Nothing But, which she promoted on the CBS television series What’s My Line?, included a chapter in which Hopper asserted their relationship was a fact. Wilding sued Hopper for libel and won.

Hopper was an advocate for actress Joan Crawford, whose career suffered in the early 1940s after she was labelled "Box-Office Poison" and forced to resign from Metro-Goldwyn-Mayer. In 1945, Hopper reprinted a press release for Mildred Pierce in her column, which described Crawford as a leading contender for the Best Actress Oscar. Such was Hopper's influence that she was credited with swinging the decision in Crawford's favor when she won the award. Hopper's support has been described as the first instance of lobbying the Academy of Motion Picture Arts and Sciences to favor a certain nominee.

Hopper lobbied for African American actor James Baskett to receive an Academy Award for his performance in the 1946 film Song of the South. Baskett would ultimately receive an honorary award for his performance. Actress ZaSu Pitts compared Hopper to "a ferret". Joan Bennett sent Hopper a "$35 valentine. The $35 went for a skunk which carried a note: 'Won't you be my valentine? Nobody else will. I stink and so do you.'" Hopper reportedly commented that the skunk was beautifully behaved. She called it Joan, and passed it on to actor James Mason and his wife as a present, as they had made the first bid after the story about the unusual gift made the news.

During World War II, Hopper's only child, actor William "Bill" Hopper, served in the Navy in Underwater Demolitions. She chastised Douglas Fairbanks Jr., the son of her old friend Douglas Fairbanks, because she thought the younger Fairbanks was shirking his duty to his country. Fairbanks Jr. recalled in his memoirs Salad Days that he was already in uniform serving in the United States Navy, and despised Hopper for her insinuations.

Actor Kirk Douglas recounted an interaction between Hopper and Elizabeth Taylor. At the premiere of Taylor and her husband Richard Burton's film The Sandpiper (1965), Hopper began to complain when she saw screenwriter Dalton Trumbo's screen credit (she had led the charge in blacklisting Trumbo for his Communist party membership). This caused Taylor to turn around and say "Hedda, why don't you just shut the fuck up?"

In 1963, Hopper complained in her column that three out of five Best Actor Oscar nominees were British and only two were American: "The weather's so foul on that tight little isle that, to get in out of the rain, they all gather in theatres and practise Hamlet on each other."

=== Feud with Louella Parsons ===
When Hopper initially came to Hollywood, she and Louella Parsons had had a mutually beneficial arrangement. At the time, Hopper was a moderately successful actress, and according to Parsons' successor, Dorothy Manners, "if anything happened on a set—if a star and leading man were having an affair—Hedda would give Louella a call.” In return, Hopper was guaranteed a few lines of copy under Parsons' increasingly influential byline.

After MGM canceled her contract, Hopper struggled to maintain her career as an actress. She was offered a position as a Hollywood columnist by the Esquire Feature Syndicate due to a recommendation by Andy Hervey of MGM’s publicity department.

One of the first papers to pick up “Hedda Hopper’s Hollywood” was the Los Angeles Times, a morning paper like Parsons' Examiner. Hopper first publicly scooped Parsons with the divorce of the president's son Jimmy Roosevelt (a Goldwyn employee), who was involved with a Mayo Clinic nurse, from his wife, Betsey. The story became front-page news across the country.

==== Citizen Kane ====
When rumors began to surface that Orson Welles’ debut film Citizen Kane was inspired by the life of William Randolph Hearst, Parsons lunched with the director, and believed his evasions and denials. Hopper arrived uninvited to an early screening of the film and wrote a scathing critique, calling it a "vicious and irresponsible attack on a great man". As a result, Hearst sent Parsons a letter complaining that he had learned about Citizen Kane from Hopper, and not her.

==== Ingrid Bergman ====
In the early 1950s, the Los Angeles Examiner ran on its front page above Parsons's byline: "Ingrid Bergman Baby Due in Three Months at Rome". Bergman left her husband, neurologist Peter Lindstrom, to live in Italy with director Roberto Rossellini, but the news that she might be pregnant was met with some skepticism. Bergman was well known for the angelic role of Sister Benedict in The Bells of St. Mary's.

Hopper, who had been a public supporter of Bergman, believed the actress's denial of the pregnancy, and printed a fervent repudiation of the rumor. However, Bergman was indeed pregnant and Hopper, enraged at being scooped, launched a PR campaign decrying Bergman for being pregnant out of wedlock, and carrying a married man's child. Parsons had allegedly received the tip from Howard Hughes, who was incensed at Bergman for being unable to shoot a film for him as promised.

==== Reaction ====
Reportedly, whereas Hopper was more inclined to see their much-publicized antagonism as funny and good for business, Parsons took it personally and saw Hopper as a rival in every possible way. Hopper also referred to Doc Martin (Parsons' third husband) as "that goddamn clap doctor", which infuriated Parsons. Louis B. Mayer assisted Hopper in establishing herself as a columnist, and her role was supported by other studio chiefs, which saw it as a step in offsetting Parsons' monopolistic power. Gossip columnist Liz Smith stated: "The studios created both of them. And they thought they could control both of them. But they became Frankenstein monsters escaped from the labs." Hopper and Parsons had a combined readership of 75 million in a country of 160 million.

== Politics ==
Hopper was a fervent Republican. During the 1944 presidential election, she spoke before a massive rally organized by David O. Selznick in the Los Angeles Coliseum in support of the Dewey-Bricker ticket, as well as Governor Earl Warren of California, who later became Dewey's running mate in 1948, and later the Chief Justice of the United States. The gathering drew 93,000, with Cecil B. DeMille as the master of ceremonies and Walt Disney as one of the speakers. Others in attendance included Ronald Reagan, Barbara Stanwyck, Ann Sothern, Ginger Rogers, Randolph Scott, Adolphe Menjou, Dick Powell, Gary Cooper, Edward Arnold, and William Bendix. Despite the good turnout at the rally, most Hollywood celebrities who took a public position sided with the Roosevelt-Truman ticket.

Hopper strongly supported the House Un-American Activities Committee (HUAC) hearings, and was a guest and speaker of the Women's Division at the 1956 Republican National Convention held in San Francisco to renominate the Eisenhower–Nixon ticket. She was so well known for her conservatism that rumor had it she planned to stand up, unfurl an American flag, and walk out of the 23rd Academy Awards ceremony in March 1951 if Jose Ferrer, who was known to be a socialist, should win Best Actor. The rumor was untrue but Hopper joked that she wished she had thought of it. Screenwriter Jay Bernstein related that when he told Hopper that many people in Hollywood privately called her a Nazi because of her extreme conservatism, the gossip columnist began to cry and replied: "Jay, all I've ever tried to be is a good American."

== Blacklisting ==
Hopper was one of the driving forces behind the creation of the Hollywood blacklist, using her 35 million strong readership to destroy the careers of those in the entertainment industry whom she suspected of being a Communist, having communist sympathies, being homosexual, or leading dissolute lives. She was a leading member of the Motion Picture Alliance for the Preservation of American Ideals, founded in 1944 and devoted to rooting out suspected Communists in Hollywood. She considered herself to be a guardian of moral standards in Hollywood and bragged that she need only wag her finger at a producer and he would break off an adulterous affair instantly.

One of Hopper's victims was screenwriter Dalton Trumbo, who was blacklisted throughout the late 1940s and 1950s partially through Hopper's consistently negative coverage of his Communist Party membership. When actor Kirk Douglas hired Trumbo to write the screenplay for Spartacus (1960), Hopper denounced the film in her column, stating that "[the script is based on] a book written by a Commie and the screen script was written by a Commie, so don't go see it." The film was a critical and financial success.

Charlie Chaplin was another target of Hedda Hopper's vitriol because of his alleged Communist sympathies and his relationships with much younger women, which she considered immoral despite her own marriage to a man 27 years her senior. She also objected to him for remaining a British citizen and not becoming an American, which she considered an act of ingratitude towards a country which had given him so much. When in 1943, he denied that he was the father of 22-year old actress Joan Barry’s child, Hopper assisted Barry in filing a paternity suit against Chaplin, launching a campaign of attrition against him through her column, and calling for him to be deported for his "moral turpitude". She defended her behavior by stating that she wished to make an example of Chaplin as "a warning to others involved in dubious relationships". Her grudge deepened when, later in the year, Chaplin married 18-year old Oona O'Neill and gave the scoop to Louella Parsons out of dislike for Hopper. For years after the paternity trial, Hopper cooperated with the FBI to destabilize Chaplin's career. This involved her printing damaging information leaked by the FBI concerning Chaplin's past Communist affiliations, while Hopper in turn provided the agency with unsavory gossip about Chaplin's personal life gleaned from her informants. Her sustained criticism of Chaplin was one of the factors which contributed to his being denied re-entry to the United States in 1952.

Actress Ingrid Bergman was also blacklisted as a result of Hopper's sustained negative coverage in her columns. Hopper had supported Bergman in her column throughout the 1940s, advocating for her to land starring roles in The Bells of St. Mary's (1945) and Joan of Arc (1948). She was enraged when Bergman lied to her about being pregnant with married director Roberto Rossellini's baby. Hopper had believed Bergman's denial of the pregnancy, printing a fervent repudiation of the rumor in 1949. However, Bergman was indeed pregnant, and the news was leaked to Hopper's arch-rival Louella Parsons, who gained the scoop. Seeking revenge, Hopper launched a PR campaign decrying Bergman for being pregnant out of wedlock and carrying a married man's child.

== Radio and television ==
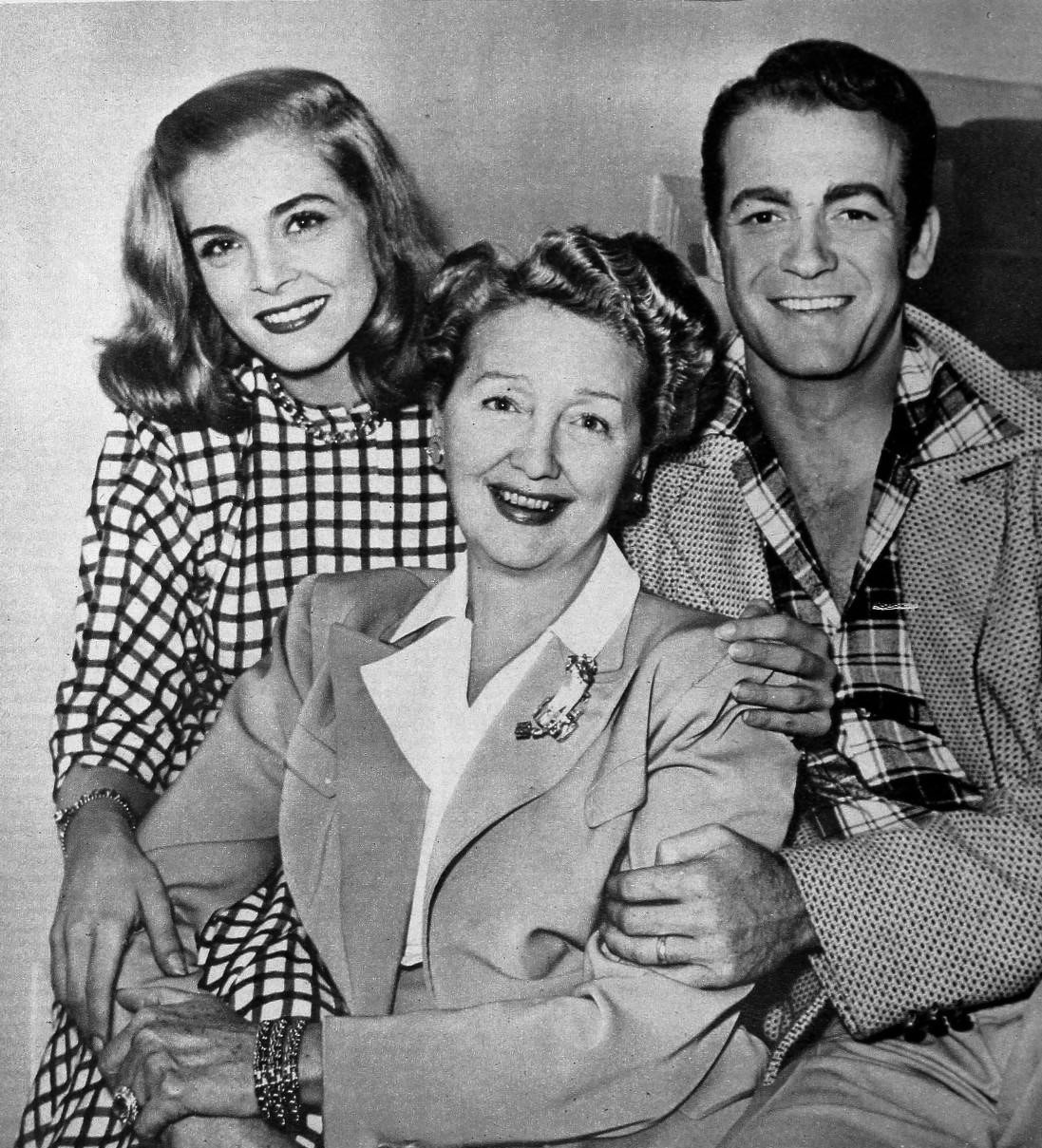
Hopper (middle) with Lizabeth Scott and Mark Stevens in 1946

Hopper had an acting role in a radio soap opera, playing Portia Brent on the Blue Network's Brenthouse beginning in February 1939. She debuted as host of her own radio program, The Hedda Hopper Show, on November 6, 1939. Sponsored by Sunkist, she was heard on CBS three times a week for 15 minutes until October 30, 1942. From October 2, 1944, to September 3, 1945, Armour Treet sponsored a once-a-week program. On September 10, 1945, she moved to ABC, still sponsored by Armour, for a weekly program that continued until June 3, 1946. Hopper moved back to CBS beginning on October 5, 1946 with a weekly 15-minute program, This Is Hollywood, sponsored by Procter & Gamble. It ran until June 28, 1947.

Expanding to 30 minutes on NBC, she was host of a variety series, The Hedda Hopper Show, broadcast from October 14, 1950, to November 11, 1950 on Saturdays, then from November 19, 1950, to May 20, 1951 on Sundays. This program featured music, talk and dramatized excerpts from movies with well-known guests, such as Broderick Crawford reprising a scene from All the King's Men (1949).

On January 10, 1960, a television special, Hedda Hopper's Hollywood, aired on NBC. Hosted by Hopper, guest interviews included an eclectic mix of past, current and future stars: Lucille Ball, Francis X. Bushman, Liza Minnelli, John Cassavetes, Robert Cummings, Marion Davies, Walt Disney, Janet Gaynor, Bob Hope, Hope Lange, Anthony Perkins, Debbie Reynolds, James Stewart, and Gloria Swanson.

Hopper had several acting roles during the latter part of her career, including brief cameo appearances as herself in the movie Sunset Boulevard (1950) and The Patsy (1964), as well as episodes of I Love Lucy, The Ford Show, Starring Tennessee Ernie Ford, and The Beverly Hillbillies, starring Buddy Ebsen. Her autobiography, From Under My Hat (Doubleday, 1952) was followed by The Whole Truth and Nothing But (1962), also published by Doubleday. She remained active as a writer until her death, producing six daily columns and a Sunday column for the Chicago Tribune syndicate, as well as writing articles for celebrity magazines such as Photoplay.

== Personal life ==
On May 8, 1913, Hopper married actor and singer DeWolf Hopper in New Jersey. They had one child, William, who later played Paul Drake in the Perry Mason series. The couple divorced in 1922.

== Death ==
Hopper died on February 1, 1966, of double pneumonia at the age of 80 at Cedars-Sinai Medical Center in Los Angeles. The probate value of Hopper's estate was $472,661 gross and $306,679 net. She is buried at Rose Hill Cemetery, Altoona, Pennsylvania. For her contribution to the motion picture industry, Hopper has a star on the Hollywood Walk of Fame at 6313½ Hollywood Boulevard in Hollywood.

== Filmography ==
Year	Title	Role	Notes
1916	The Battle of Hearts	Maida Rhodes	Lost film Credited as Elda Furry
1917	Her Excellency, the Governor	Sylvia Marlowe	Lost film Credited as Elda Milar
1917	The Food Gamblers	June Justice	Lost film
1917	Seven Keys to Baldpate	Myra Thornhill	Credited as Elda Furry
1917	Nearly Married	Hattie King	Abridged version extant
1918	The Beloved Traitor	Myrna Bliss	
1918	By Right of Purchase	Society Woman	Incomplete film Uncredited
1918	Virtuous Wives	Irma Delabarre	Lost film Credited as Mrs. DeWolf Hopper
1919	The Third Degree	Mrs. Howard Jeffries, Sr	Lost film
1919	Sadie Love	Mrs. James Wakeley	Lost film
1919	The Isle of Conquest	Mrs. Harmon	Lost film
1920	The Man Who Lost Himself	Countess of Rochester	Lost film
1920	The New York Idea	Vida Phillimore	
1921	Heedless Moths	His Wife	Lost film
1921	The Inner Chamber	Mrs. Candor	Lost film Credited as Mrs. DeWolf Hopper
1921	Conceit	Mrs. Agnes Crombie	Credited as Mrs. DeWolf Hopper
1922	Sherlock Holmes	Madge Larrabee	
1922	What's Wrong with the Women?	Mrs. Neer	Lost film Credited as Mrs. DeWolf Hopper
1922	Women Men Marry	Eleanor Carter	
1923	Has the World Gone Mad!	Mrs. Adams	Lost film
1923	Reno	Mrs. Kate Norton Tappan	
1924	Gambling Wives	Madame Zoe	Lost film
1924	Why Men Leave Home	Nina Neilson	
1924	Happiness	Mrs. Chrystal Pole	
1924	Miami	Mary Tate	Lost film
1924	Another Scandal	Cousin Elizabeth MacKenzie	Lost film
1924	Sinners in Silk	Mrs. Stevens	Lost film
1924	The Snob	Mrs. Leiter	Lost film
1925	Her Market Value	Mrs. Bernice Hamilton	
1925	Declassée	Lady Wildering	
1925	Dangerous Innocence	Muriel Church	Lost film
1925	Zander the Great	Mrs. Caldwell	
1925	Raffles, the Amateur Cracksman	Mrs. Clarice Vidal	
1925	The Teaser	Margaret Wyndham	Lost film
1925	Borrowed Finery	Mrs. Bordon	
1926	Dance Madness	Valentina	Lost film
1926	The Caveman	Mrs. Van Dream	
1926	Pleasures of the Rich	Mona Vincent	Lost film
1926	Skinner's Dress Suit	Mrs. Colby	
1926	Lew Tyler's Wives	Virginia Philips	Lost film
1926	The Silver Treasure	Mrs. Gould	Lost film
1926	Don Juan	Marchesia Rinaldo	
1926	Fools of Fashion	Countess de Fragni	
1926	Obey The Law	Society Woman	
1927	Orchids and Ermine	The Modiste	
1927	Venus of Venice	Jean's Mother	
1927	Children of Divorce	Katherine Flanders	
1927	Matinee Ladies	Mrs. Aldrich	Lost film
1927	Wings	Mrs. Powell	Uncredited
1927	Black Tears		Lost film
1927	The Cruel Truth	Grace Sturdevant	
1927	Adam and Evil	Eleanor Leighton	Lost film
1927	One Woman to Another	Olive Gresham	Lost film
1927	The Drop Kick	Mrs. Hamill	
1927	A Reno Divorce	Hedda Frane	Lost film
1927	French Dressing		Lost film Uncredited
1928	Love and Learn	Mrs. Ann Blair	Lost film
1928	The Whip Woman	Countess Ferenzi	Lost film
1928	The Port of Missing Girls	Mrs. C. King	
1928	The Chorus Kid	Mrs. Garrett	Lost film
1928	Harold Teen	Mrs. Hazzit	
1928	Green Grass Widows	Mrs. Worthing	
1928	Undressed	Mrs. Stanley	Lost film
1928	Runaway Girls	Mrs. Hartley	Lost film
1928	Companionate Marriage	Mrs. Moore	Lost film
1929	Girls Gone Wild	Mrs. Holworthy	Lost film
1929	The Last of Mrs. Cheyney	Lady Maria	
1929	His Glorious Night	Mrs. Collingswood Stratton	
1929	Half Marriage	Mrs. Page	
1929	The Racketeer	Mrs. Karen Lee	
1929	A Song of Kentucky	Mrs. Coleman	Lost film
1930	Such Men Are Dangerous	Muriel Wyndham	
1930	High Society Blues	Mrs. Divine	
1930	Murder Will Out	Aunt Pat	Lost film
1930	Holiday	Susan Potter	
1930	Let Us Be Gay	Madge Livingston	
1930	Our Blushing Brides	Mrs. Weaver	
1930	War Nurse	Matron	
1931	The Easiest Way	Mrs. Clara Williams	Uncredited
1931	The Prodigal	Christine	
1931	Men Call It Love	Callie	
1931	A Tailor Made Man	Mrs. Stanlaw	
1931	Shipmates	Auntie	
1931	The Common Law	Mrs. Clare Collis	
1931	The Mystery Train	Mrs. Marian Radcliffe	
1931	Rebound	Liz Crawford	
1931	Flying High	Mrs. Smith	
1931	West of Broadway	Mrs. Edith Trent	
1931	Good Sport	Mrs. Atherton	
1932	The Man Who Played God	Mrs. Alice Chittendon	
1932	Night World	Mrs. Rand	
1932	As You Desire Me	Ines Montari	
1932	Skyscraper Souls	Ella Dwight	
1932	Downstairs	Countess De Marnac	
1932	Speak Easily	Mrs. Peets	
1932	The Unwritten Law	Jean Evans	
1933	Men Must Fight	Mrs. Chase	
1933	The Barbarian	Mrs. Loway, American Tourist	
1933	Pilgrimage	Mrs. Worth (Gary Worth's mother)	
1933	Beauty for Sale	Madame Sonia Barton	
1934	Bombay Mail	Lady Daniels	
1934	Let's Be Ritzy	Mrs. Burton	
1934	Little Man, What Now?	Nurse	
1934	No Ransom	Mrs. John Winfield	
1935	One Frightened Night	Laura Proctor	
1935	Society Fever	Mrs. Vandergriff	
1935	Lady Tubbs	Mrs. Ronald Ash-Orcutt	
1935	Alice Adams	Mrs. Palmer	
1935	I Live My Life	Alvin's Mother	
1935	Three Kids and a Queen	Mrs. Cummings	
1935	Ship Cafe	Tutor	
1936	The Dark Hour	Mrs. Tallman	
1936	Doughnuts and Society	Mrs. Murray Hill	
1936	Dracula's Daughter	Lady Esme Hammond	
1936	Bunker Bean	Mrs. Dorothy Kent	
1937	You Can't Buy Luck	Mrs. Agnes White	
1937	Dangerous Holiday	Lottie Courtney	
1937	Topper	Mrs. Grace Stuyvesant	
1937	Artists and Models	Mrs. Townsend	
1937	Vogues of 1938	Mrs. Van Klettering	Uncredited
1937	Nothing Sacred	Dowager on Ship	Uncredited
1938	Tarzan's Revenge	Penny Reed	
1938	Maid's Night Out	Mrs. Harrison	
1938	Dangerous to Know	Mrs. Emily Carson	
1938	Thanks for the Memory	Polly Griscom	
1939	Midnight	Stephanie	
1939	The Women	Dolly Dupuyster	
1939	What a Life	Mrs. Aldrich	
1939	That's Right – You're Wrong	Herself – Newspaper Columnist	Uncredited
1939	Laugh It Off	Elizabeth "Lizzie" Rockingham	
1940	Queen of the Mob	Mrs. Emily Sturgis	
1940	Cross-Country Romance	Mrs. North	
1941	Life with Henry	Mrs. Aldrich	
1941	I Wanted Wings	Mrs. Young	Uncredited
1942	Reap the Wild Wind	Aunt Henrietta Beresford	
1950	Sunset Boulevard	Herself	
1960	Pepe	Herself, Cameo appearance	
1961	The Right Approach	Newspaper Columnist	Uncredited
1964	The Patsy	Herself	
1966	The Oscar	Herself	

Television
Year	Title	Role	Notes
1951–1963	What's My Line?	Herself – Mystery Guest	7 episodes
1953	Goodyear Television Playhouse	Hostess	Episode: "A. Fadeout"
1955	I Love Lucy	Herself	Episode: "The Hedda Hopper Story"
1955	The Colgate Comedy Hour	Herself – Gossip Columnist	2 episodes
1956	The Bob Hope Show	Herself	2 episodes
1956	The Tennessee Ernie Ford Show	Herself	Episode #1.19
1957	Playhouse 90	Various roles	2 episodes
1957	The Lucy–Desi Comedy Hour	Herself	Episode: "Lucy Takes a Cruise to Havana"
1958	The Garry Moore Show	Herself	Episode #1.5
1959	Small World	Herself	Episode #2.8
1959	Westinghouse Desilu Playhouse	Herself	Episode: "The Desilu Revue"
1960	Hedda Hopper's Hollywood	Host	Television special
1960	The Steve Allen Show	Herself	Episode: "The Movie Premiere of 'Can-Can'"
1961	Here's Hollywood	Herself	October 31, 1961 episode
1964	The Beverly Hillbillies	Herself	Episode: "Hedda Hopper's Hollywood"
1966	The New Alice in Wonderland	Hedda, the Mad Hatter	Voice, TV movie, (final film role & posthumous release)

== In popular culture ==
=== Portrayals ===
- The character of Patty Benedict in The Big Knife (1955) played by Ilka Chase is likely inspired by Hedda Hopper. In the film, she is an influential gossip columnist who threatens to publish an old scandal involving the main character if he does not give her information on his struggling marriage. The film is an adaption of a play of the same name written by Clifford Odets.
- Jane Alexander received a Primetime Emmy Award nomination portraying Hopper in the television film Malice in Wonderland (1985), opposite Elizabeth Taylor as Louella Parsons.
- Cynthia Adler portrayed Hedda Hopper in the documentary Carmen Miranda: Bananas is My Business (1995).
- Hopper was portrayed by Katherine Helmond in the television film Liz: The Elizabeth Taylor Story (1995).
- Rue McClanahan played Priscilla Tremaine, a thinly veiled version of Hopper, on the AMC's show The Lot (1999), a comedic miniseries about the Golden Age of Hollywood.
- Fiona Shaw played Hopper in the movie RKO 281 (1999), which is concerned with the making of Citizen Kane (1941).
- By Joanne Linville in the television film James Dean (2001).
- By Jenn Colella in Chaplin: The Musical during 2006 and on Broadway in 2012.
- Helen Mirren played Hedda Hopper in the movie Trumbo (2015), directed by Jay Roach.
- Tilda Swinton played in Hail, Caesar! (2016), the double part of Thora and Thessaly Thacker, two identical twin sister gossip columnists (mimicking the rivalry between Hedda Hopper and Louella Parsons, but both heavily based on Hopper herself).
- In the first season of Feud in 2017, Hopper was played by Judy Davis, who received a Primetime Emmy Award nomination.
- The New York City Opera announced that it would stage the East Coast premiere of Stewart Wallace's Hopper's Wife – a 1997 chamber opera about an imagined marriage between painter Edward Hopper and Hedda Hopper – at Harlem Stage from April 28 through May 1, 2016.
- In the 2026 film Jimmy, Hopper is portrayed by Sarah Drew.

== See also ==
- Jimmie Fidler
