= The Empty Cradle (film) =

1923 film directed by Burton L. King

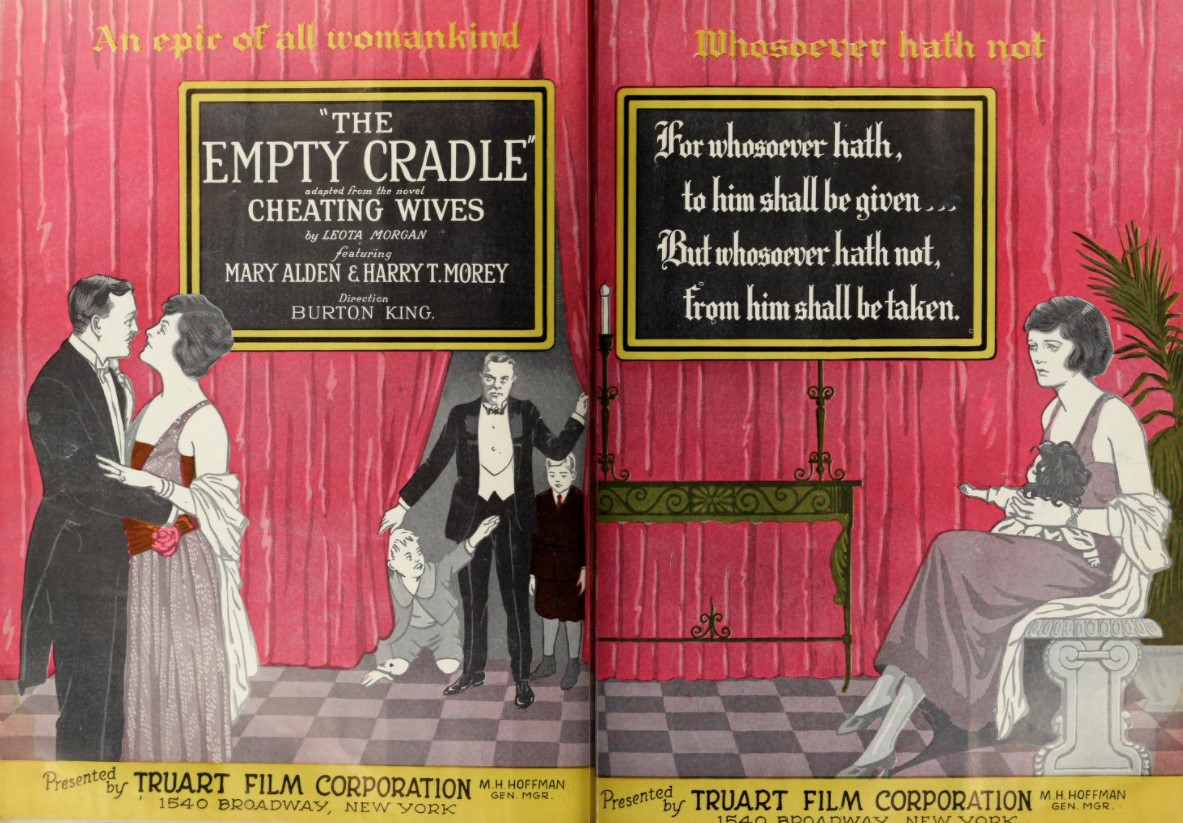
- Trade advertisement
- Directed by: Burton L. King
- Based on: "Cheating Wives by Leota Morgan
- Produced by: Burton L. King
- Starring: Mary Alden; Harry T. Morey; Mickey Bennett
- Production company: State Pictures
- Distributed by: Truart Film Corporation
- Release date: May 1, 1923
- Running time: 70 minutes
- Country: United States
- Language: Silent (English intertitles)

The Empty Cradle is a 1923 American silent drama film directed by Burton L. King and starring Mary Alden, Harry T. Morey, and Mickey Bennett.

== Cast ==
- Mary Alden as Alice Larkin
- Harry T. Morey as John Larkin
- Mickey Bennett as Buddy Larkin
- Edward Quinn as Frankie Larkin
- Helen Rowland as Baby Louise
- Coit Albertson as Robert Lewis
- Madeline La Varre as Ethel
- Ricca Allen as Martha Blake

== Preservation ==
Although no prints of The Empty Cradle located are in any film archives, an abridgement exists.

== Bibliography ==
- Munden, Kenneth White. The American Film Institute Catalog of Motion Pictures Produced in the United States, Part 1. University of California Press, 1997.
