= Buried Treasure (1921 film) =

1921 film by George D. Baker

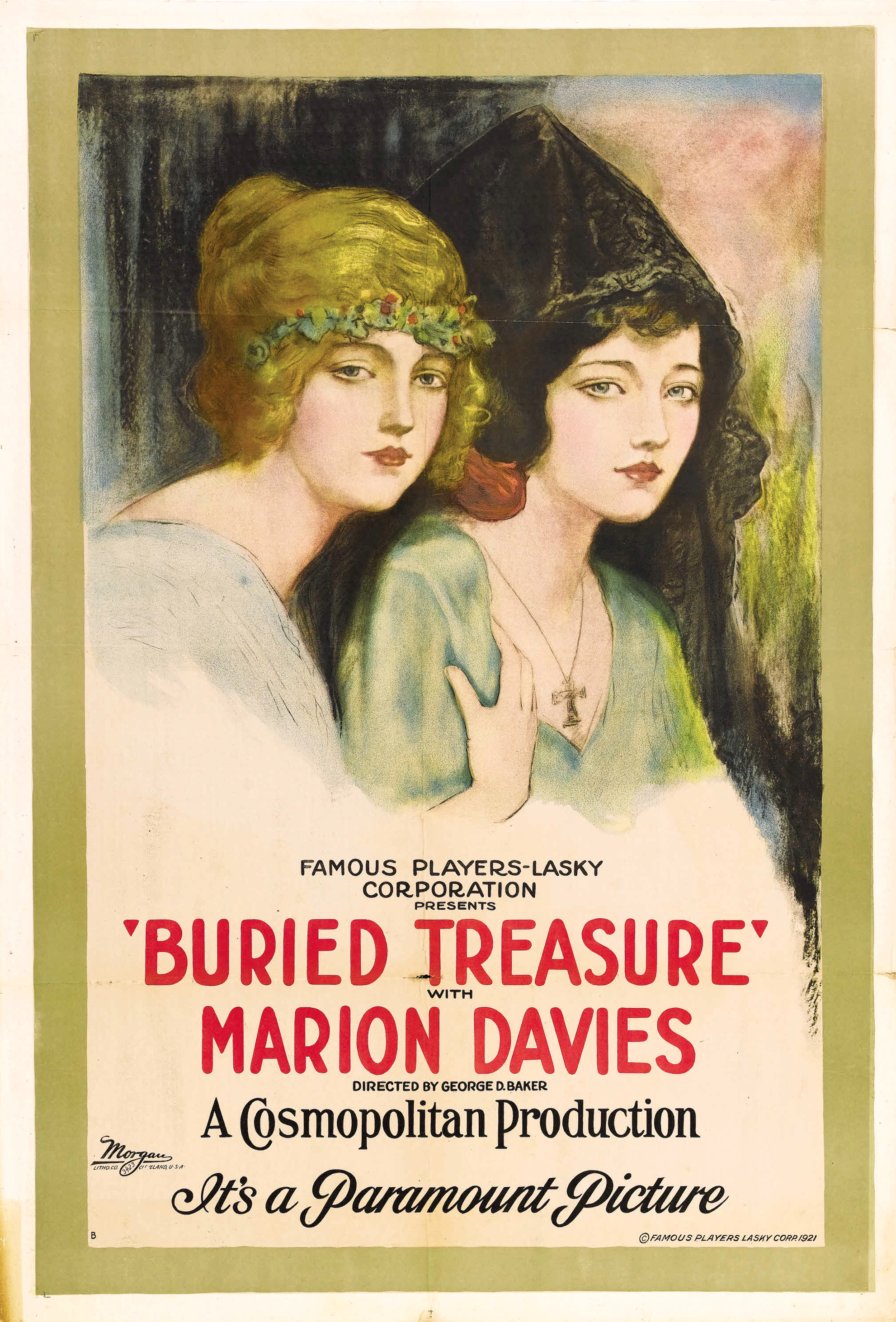
- Theatrical release poster
- Directed by: George D. Baker
- Screenplay by: George D. Baker; F. Britten Austin
- Starring: Marion Davies; Norman Kerry; Anders Randolf; Edith Shayne; Earl Schenck; John Charles; Thomas Findley
- Cinematography: Harold Rosson
- Production company: Cosmopolitan Productions
- Distributed by: Paramount Pictures
- Release date: April 10, 1921
- Running time: 70 minutes
- Country: United States
- Language: Silent (English intertitles)

Buried Treasure is a 1921 American silent adventure film directed by George D. Baker and written by George D. Baker and F. Britten Austin. The film stars Marion Davies, Norman Kerry, Anders Randolf, Edith Shayne, Earl Schenck, John Charles, and Thomas Findley. The film was released on April 10, 1921, by Paramount Pictures.

== Plot ==
Strung around the idea of reincarnation, this film goes back in time to the days of the Spanish galleons and pirates burying their treasure; treasure to be found centuries later.

== Cast ==
- Marion Davies as Pauline Vandermuellen / Lucia / others
- Norman Kerry as Dr. John Grant
- Anders Randolf as William Vandermuellen
- Edith Shayne as Mrs. Vandermuellen
- Earl Schenck as Joeffrey Vandermuellen
- John Charles as Duc de Chavannes
- Thomas Findley as The Captain

== Production ==
In her 10th film, Marion Davies plays a young woman whose trances lead her to a pirate's treasure. The theme of reincarnation was rare for the time. This was the first film in which Davies played a dual role: She plays the modern-day Pauline as well as the Spanish Lucia. This was also the first Davies production to be filmed on the West Coast, with several scenes filmed on Catalina. The prologue to the film shows Davies as a cavewoman, an Egyptian princess, a medieval damsel, and as Lucia.

== Status ==
A nitrate print of Buried Treasure held in the Library of Congress is missing a reel. A limited edition DVD was released by Edward Lorusso with a music score by Lorusso and David Drazin in October 2017.
