= Man and Wife (1923 film) =

1923 film

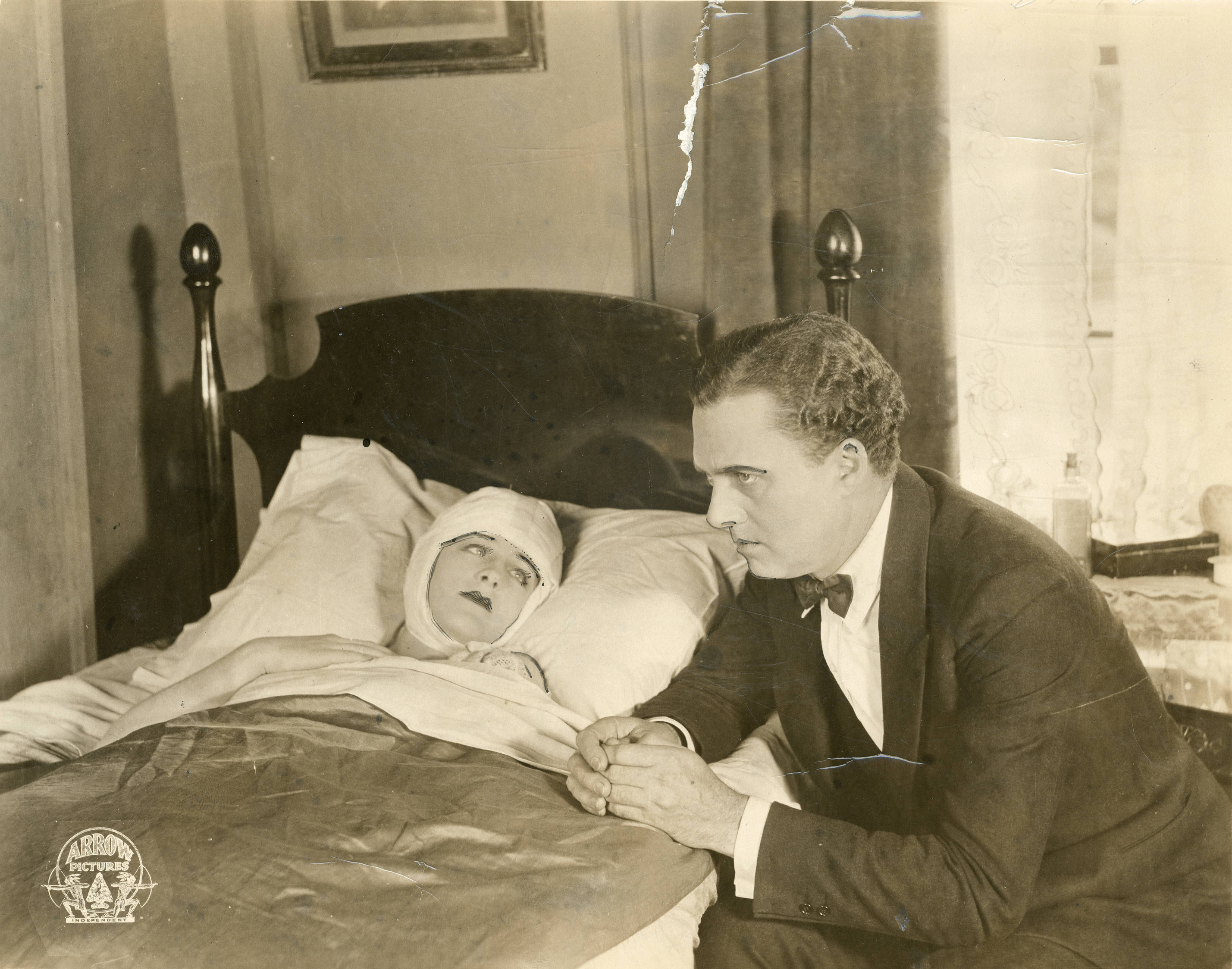
- Film still
- Directed by: John L. McCutcheon
- Written by: Leota Morgan (story, scenario)
- Produced by: Effanem Productions
- Starring: Maurice Costello; Norma Shearer
- Distributed by: Arrow Film Corporation
- Release date: March 25, 1923
- Running time: 50 minutes; 5 reels (5,500 feet)
- Country: United States
- Language: Silent (English intertitles)

Man and Wife is a 1923 American silent domestic drama film starring Maurice Costello and a young Norma Shearer. It was directed by John L. McCutcheon, produced by an independent producer and released by second-tier Arrow Film Corporation.

== Cast ==
- Maurice Costello as Caleb Perkins
- Gladys Leslie as Dolly Perkins
- Norma Shearer as Dora Perkins
- Edna May Spooner as Mrs. Perkins
- Robert Elliott as Doctor Howard Fleming
- Ernest Hilliard as Walter Powell

== Preservation ==
Man and Wife was preserved and restored by the UCLA Film & Television Archive from a 35mm tinted and toned nitrate print. Restoration funding was provided by the National Film Preservation Foundation. The restoration had its Los Angeles premiere at the 2024 UCLA Festival of Preservation.
