= The Phantom of the Turf =

1928 film

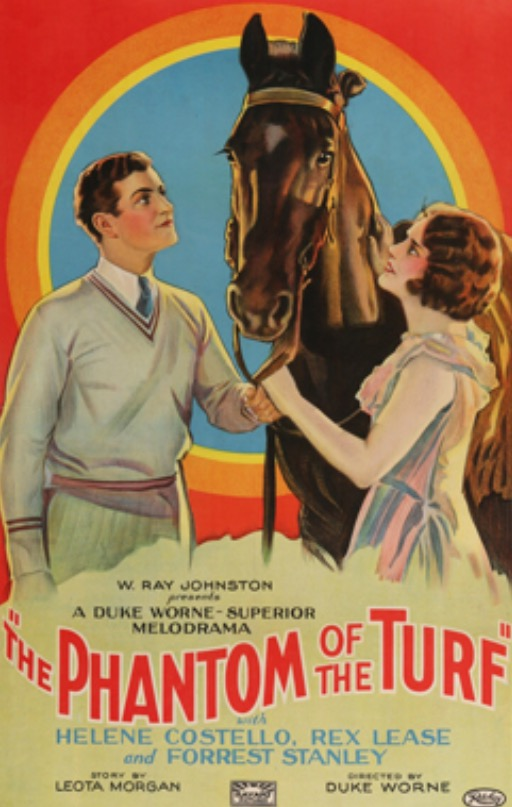
- Directed by: Duke Worne
- Written by: Leota Morgan; Arthur Hoerl
- Produced by: W. Ray Johnston; Duke Worne
- Starring: Helene Costello; Rex Lease; Forrest Stanley
- Cinematography: Walter L. Griffin
- Edited by: Malcolm Sweeney
- Production company: Duke Worne Productions
- Distributed by: Rayart Pictures
- Release date: March 1928
- Running time: 60 minutes
- Country: United States
- Languages: Silent; English intertitles

The Phantom of the Turf is a 1928 American silent sports drama film directed by Duke Worne and starring Helene Costello, Rex Lease and Forrest Stanley.

== Synopsis ==
When the owner of a thoroughbred racehorse is murdered, a man steps in as the guardian of his two children and helps unravel the mystery ahead of a major race.

== Cast ==
- Helene Costello as Joan
- Rex Lease as John Nichols
- Forrest Stanley as Dunbarton
- Danny Hoy as Billy
- Clarence Wilson as The Lawyer

== Bibliography ==
- Connelly, Robert B. The Silents: Silent Feature Films, 1910-36, Volume 40, Issue 2. December Press, 1998.
