= Miami (1924 film) =

1924 film by Alan Crosland

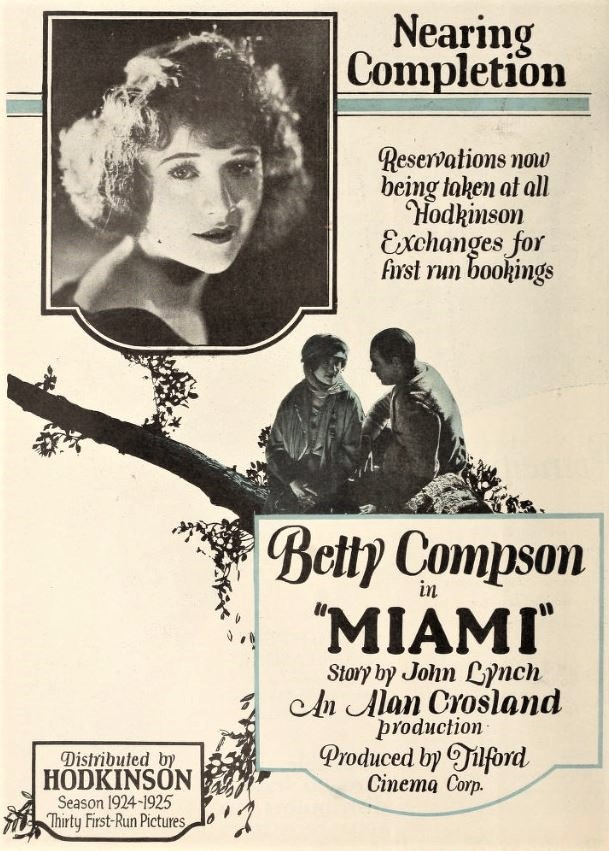
- Advertisement
- Directed by: Alan Crosland
- Story by: John Lynch
- Produced by: Alan Crosland
- Starring: Betty Compson; Lawford Davidson; Hedda Hopper
- Cinematography: Dal Clawson
- Production company: Tilford Cinema Corporation
- Distributed by: W. W. Hodkinson Corporation
- Release date: April 27, 1924
- Running time: 70 minutes
- Country: United States
- Language: Silent (English intertitles)

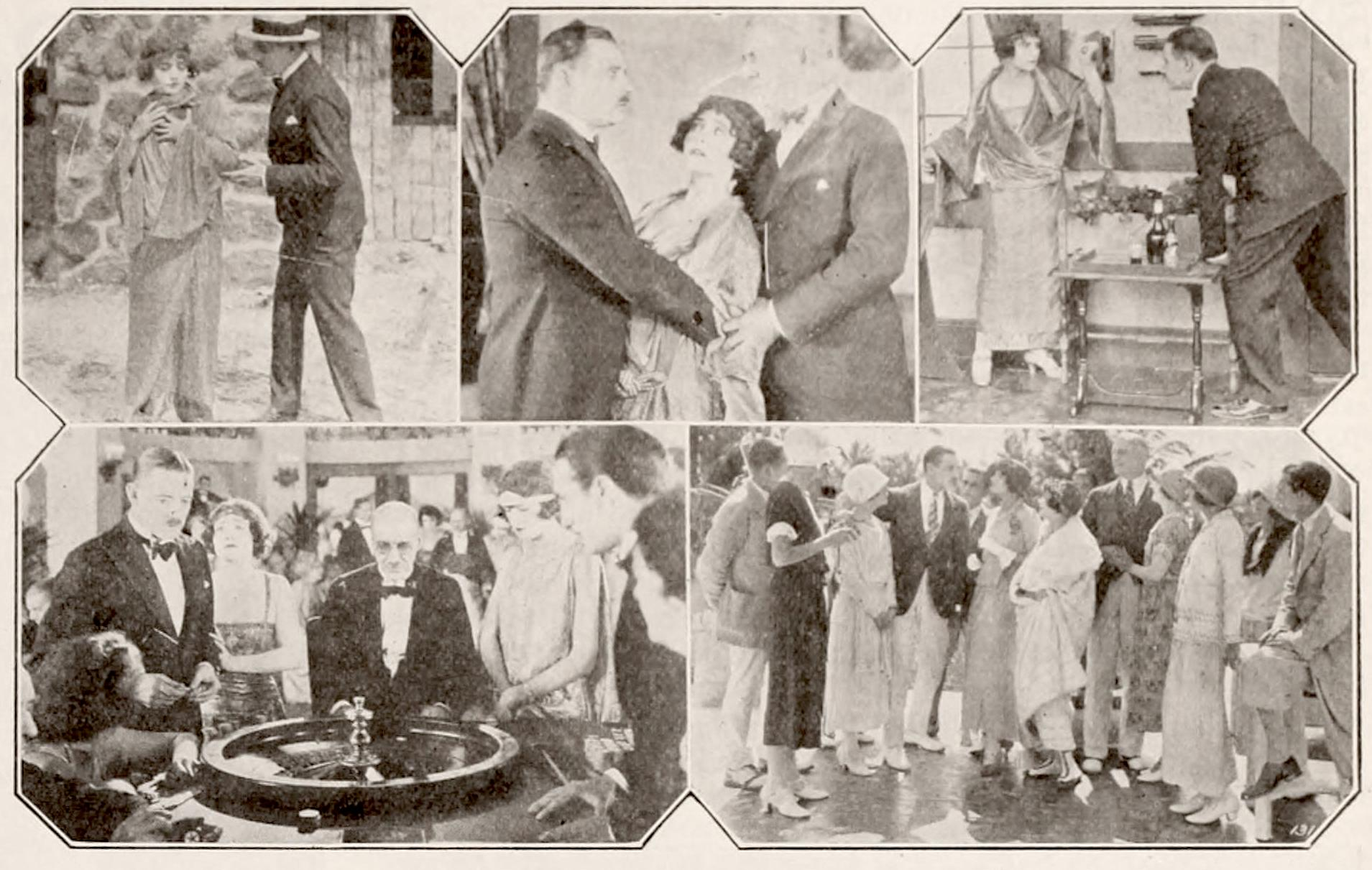
Several scenes from the film

Miami is a 1924 American silent society melodrama film directed by Alan Crosland and distributed by W. W. Hodkinson. The film stars Betty Compson and Hedda Hopper.

== Cast ==
- Betty Compson as Joan Bruce
- Lawford Davidson as Ransom Tate
- Hedda Hopper as Mary Tate
- J. Barney Sherry as David Forbes
- Lucy Fox as Veronica Forbes
- Benjamin F. Finney, Jr. as Grant North

== Preservation ==
Miami is currently presumed lost. In February of 2021, the film was cited by the National Film Preservation Board on their Lost U.S. Silent Feature Films list.

== See also ==
- List of lost films
