= Gambling Wives =

1924 film by Dell Henderson

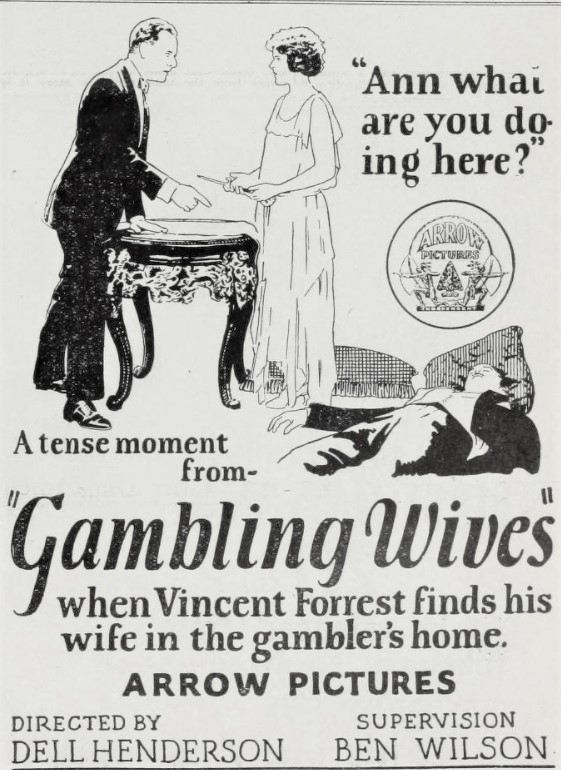
- Advertisement
- Directed by: Dell Henderson
- Screenplay by: Leota Morgan
- Story by: Ashley T. Locke
- Produced by: Ben F. Wilson
- Starring: Marjorie Daw
- Cinematography: Eddie Linden
- Production company: Ben Wilson Productions
- Distributed by: Arrow Film Corporation
- Release date: February 10, 1924
- Running time: 70 minutes
- Country: United States
- Language: Silent (English intertitles)

Gambling Wives is a 1924 American silent melodrama film. Directed by Dell Henderson and produced by actor-producer Ben F. Wilson, it was released through Arrow Films. The film stars Marjorie Daw.

== Plot ==
As described in a film magazine review, Vincent Forrest is a young bank clerk who, lured by a desire for gambling, visits a fashionable gambling house run by Madame Zoe, who is being maintained by Van Merton. Sylvia Baldwin, a friend of his wife Ann tells her what is happening, and advises her to play his game in order to win him back. Since the husband is infatuated with Madame Zoe, Sylvia arranges so that Ann is able to interest herself in Merton. The usual complications arise, and the husband realizes what is happening in time to save his wife and restore happiness to their marriage.

== Cast ==
- Marjorie Daw as Ann Forrest
- Baby Dorothy Brock as Baby June
- Edward Earle as Vincent Forrest
- Lee Moran as A Friend
- Betty Francisco as Sylvia Baldwin
- Joe Girard as Duke Baldwin
- Florence Lawrence as Polly Barker
- Ward Crane as Van Merton
- Hedda Hopper as Madame Zoe

== Preservation ==
With no copies of Gambling Wives located in any film archives, it is a lost film.
