= Runaway Girls =

1928 film by Mark Sandrich

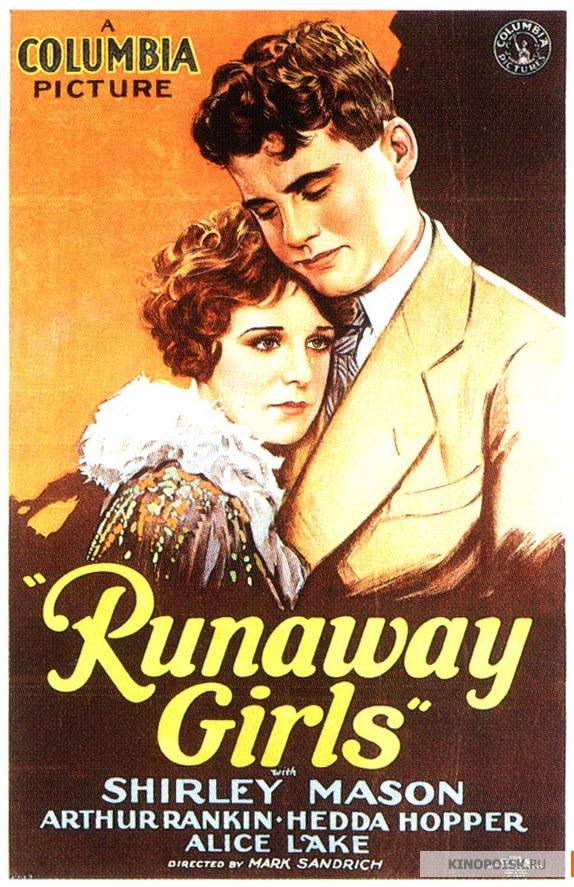
- Directed by: Mark Sandrich
- Written by: Lillie Hayward (story); Dorothy Howell (continuity); Morton Blumenstock (intertitles)
- Produced by: Harry Cohn
- Starring: Shirley Mason; Arthur Rankin; Hedda Hopper
- Cinematography: Harry Davis
- Edited by: Frank Atkinson
- Distributed by: Columbia Pictures
- Release date: August 23, 1928
- Running time: 58 minutes
- Country: United States

Runaway Girls is a lost 1928 silent film drama directed by Mark Sandrich and starring Shirley Mason and Hedda Hopper. It was produced by Harry Cohn and distributed by his Columbia Pictures, then a fledgling studio.

== Cast ==
- Shirley Mason as Sue Hartley
- Arthur Rankin as Jim Grey
- Hedda Hopper as Mrs. Hartley
- Alice Lake as Agnes Brady
- George Irving as John Hartley
- Edward Earle as Varden
