= Her Market Value =

1925 film by Paul Powell

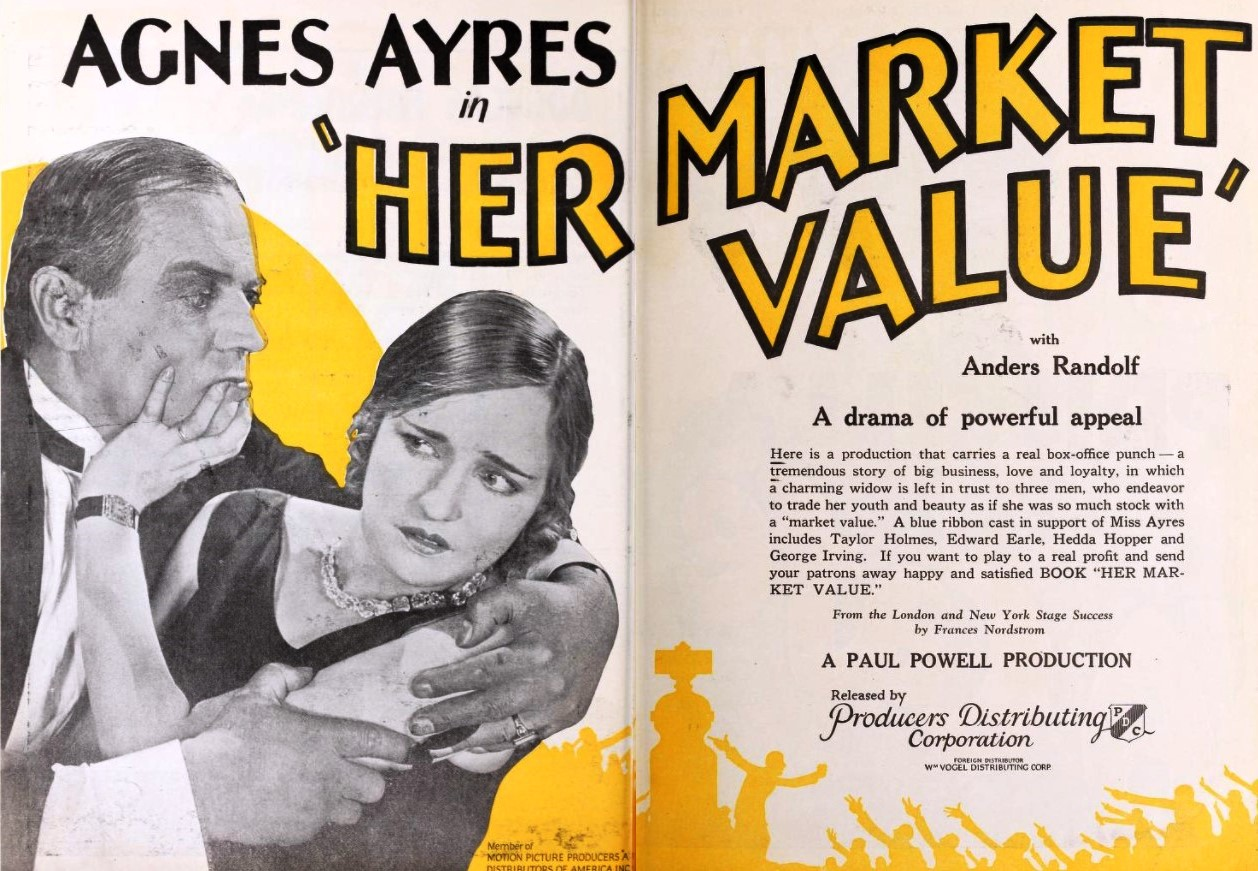
- Advertisement
- Directed by: Paul Powell
- Written by: Olga Printzlau (adaptation)
- Story by: Frances Nordstrom
- Produced by: Paul Powell
- Starring: Agnes Ayres; Anders Randolf; Hedda Hopper
- Distributed by: Producers Distributing Corporation
- Release date: February 9, 1925
- Running time: 6 reels 1807.77m (5,931 feet)
- Country: United States
- Language: Silent (English intertitles)

Her Market Value is a 1925 American silent melodrama film directed by Paul Powell and starring Agnes Ayres. Powell produced the picture and distributed through Producers Distributing Corporation.

== Plot ==
As described in a film magazine review, unwise investments wipe out Dumont, formerly a wealthy man. He drowns himself and three estate trustees discuss the penniless wife. They “invest” $30,000 in her and she uses the money to pay off her husband’s debts. The three men then vie for Nancy’s hand, but Davis, learning her true market value, finally buys out the others and gets Nancy’s love and hand in the bargain.

== Cast ==
- Agnes Ayres as Nancy Dumont
- George Irving as Harvey Dumont
- Anders Randolf as Cyrus Hamilton
- Hedda Hopper as Mrs. Bernice Hamilton
- Edward Earle as Anthony Davis
- Taylor Holmes as Courtney Brooks
- Gertrude Short as Kitty
- Sidney Bracey as Banks
- Phillips Holmes as Party boy (uncredited)
- Tom Ricketts as Old Gander (uncredited)

== Preservation ==
A print of Her Market Value is held at UCLA Film & Television Archive.
