= Edna May Spooner =

American actress, playwright, and vaudeville performer (1873–1953)

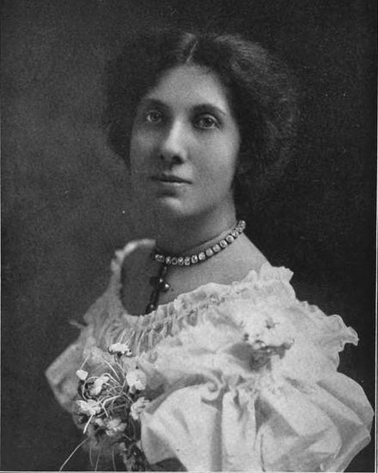
- Spooner in a 1907 publication
- Born: May 10, 1873; Centerville, Iowa, U.S.
- Died: July 14, 1953 (aged 80); Sherman Oaks, California, U.S.
- Occupation: Actor

Edna May Spooner (May 10, 1873 – July 14, 1953), sometimes spelled as Edna Mae Spooner, was an American actress, playwright, and vaudeville performer.

== Early life ==
Edna May Spooner was born in Centerville, Iowa, the daughter of Benjamin Spurgeon "Spurge" Spooner and Mary Gibbs Manson "Mollie." Spooner. Her parents founded the Spooner Stock Company, a touring company of actors. Her mother was a member of the New York Theatrical Managers' Association. Her younger sister was actress and director Cecil Spooner, who married playwright Charles E. Blaney. Her maternal uncle was actor Corse Payton.

== Career ==
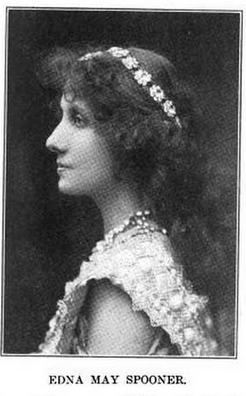
1905

Spooner and her sister toured and performed with the Spooner Stock company for many years. "The springtime and the Spooners have come again," commented writer Willa Cather, on the family's perennial appearances in Lincoln, Nebraska.

Spooner was a fixture in Brooklyn's theatres. She and her mother and sister leased and ran the Bijou Theatre for several years. and she had her own company, the Edna May Spooner Stock Company. The Spooners also ran a theatre in New Orleans, Louisiana for a time. She also directed shows, with her mother as manager and her sister as actress. Some of her popular roles were in Ullie Akerstrom's St. Elmo (1910), Zaza, Camille, Juliet, Nell Gwynne.

Spooner appeared on Broadway in Babbling Brookes (1927), and in one silent picture, Man and Wife (1923). She wrote a historical drama, Madame du Barry (1908), and translated and adapted The Obstinate Family, a German one-act farce.

== Controversies ==
In 1901, Spooner and slightly younger fellow actress Edna May were engaged in legal and publicity struggles over their shared given name. In the end, both women continued to be called "Edna May" in professional contexts. In 1902, Spooner received a written death threat from a disgruntled theatre worker, angry that her mother would not hire him.

== Personal life ==
In 1912, Edna May Spooner married fellow actor Arthur Behrens, also known as Arthur Whaley. They divorced in 1921. She was active in the Iowa New Yorkers, a club for Iowa natives in New York City, and in the Actors' Church Alliance. She retired from the stage in 1929, moved from Connecticut to California with her sister in 1947, and died in 1953, in Sherman Oaks, California, aged 80 years.
