= The Streets of New York (1922 film) =

1922 film directed by Burton King

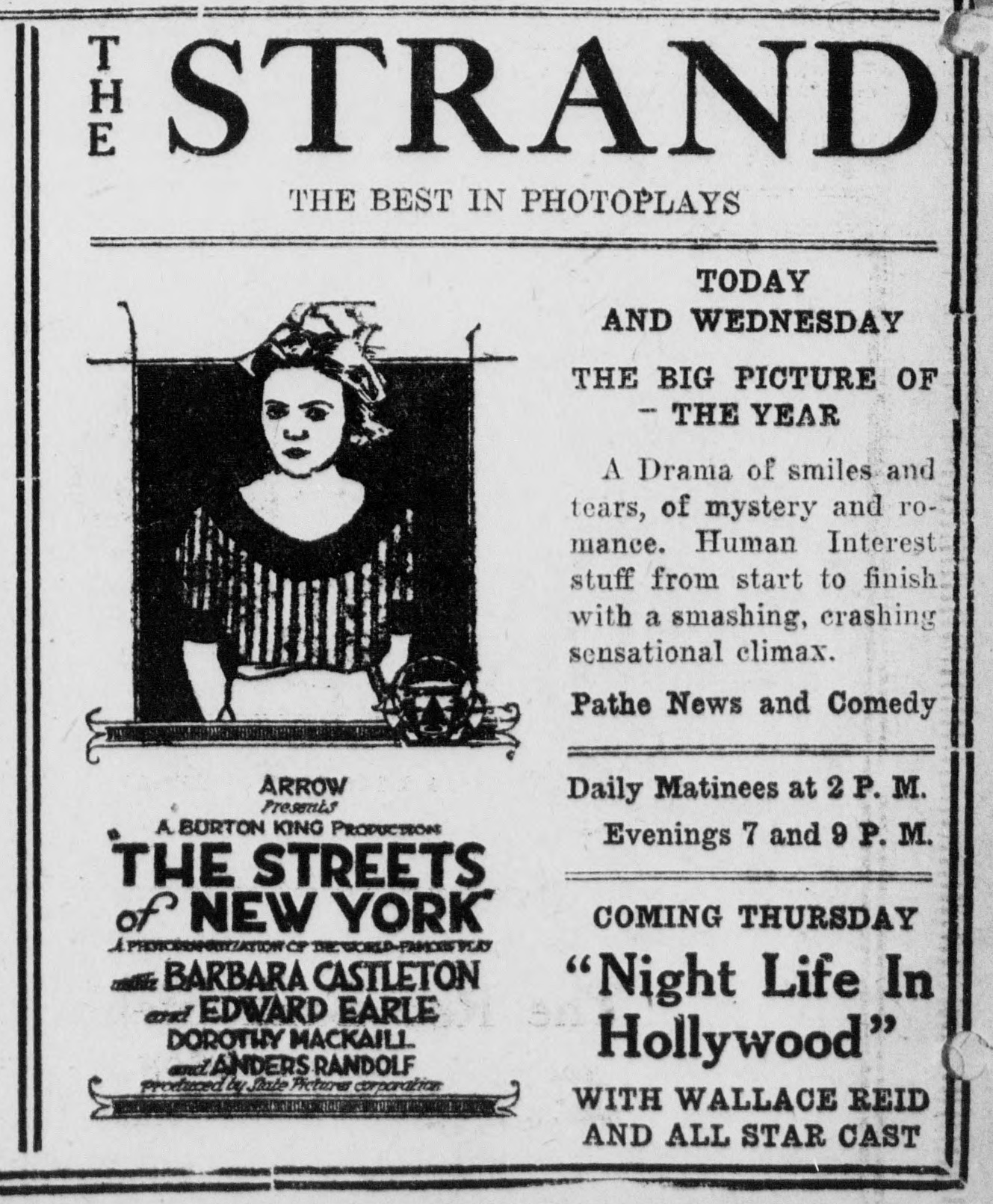
- Contemporary advertisement
- Directed by: Burton King
- Written by: Leota Morgan (scenario)
- Based on: The Streets of New York or Poverty is No Crime by Dion Boucicault
- Produced by: Burton King
- Starring: Anders Randolf; Barbara Castleton; Dorothy Mackaill
- Cinematography: Alfred Ortlieb
- Distributed by: Arrow Film Corporation
- Release date: November 15, 1922
- Running time: 7 reels
- Country: United States
- Language: Silent (English intertitles)

The Streets of New York is a lost 1922 American silent drama film directed by Burton King and starring Dorothy Mackaill. The film is based on a Victorian era play by Dion Boucicault The Streets of New York.

== Cast ==
- Anders Randolf as Gideon Bloodgood
- Leslie King as Badger
- Barbara Castleton as Lucy Bloodgood
- Edward Earle as Paul Fairweather
- Dorothy Mackaill as Sally Ann
- Kate Blancke as Jenny
