= The Third Degree (1919 film) =

1919 American movie directed by Tom Terriss

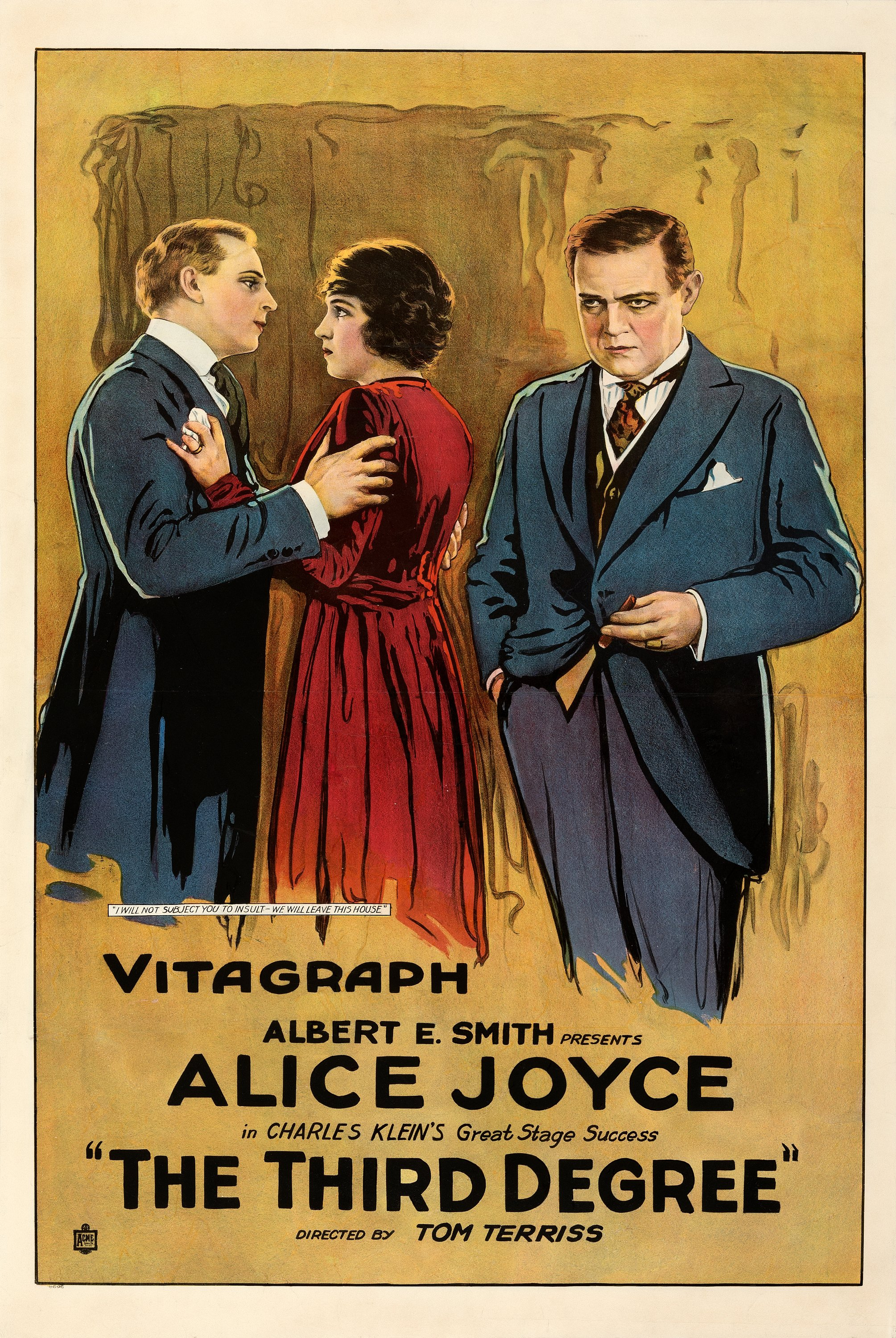
- Theatrical release poster
- Directed by: Tom Terriss
- Written by: Phil Lang (scenario); Eugene Mullin (scenario)
- Based on: The Third Degree, a Play in Four Acts by Charles Klein
- Produced by: Albert E. Smith; J. Stuart Blackton
- Starring: Alice Joyce
- Cinematography: Joe Shelderfer
- Edited by: George Randolph Chester; Mrs. George Randolph Chester
- Distributed by: Vitagraph Company of America
- Release date: May 19, 1919 (United States)
- Running time: 50 minutes
- Country: United States
- Language: Silent (English intertitles)

The Third Degree is a 1919 American silent crime drama directed by Tom Terriss produced and distributed by the Vitagraph Company of America. It is based on the 1909 play of the same name by Charles Klein.

Filmed several times throughout the silent era, this version starred Alice Joyce with actress/gossip columnist Hedda Hopper in a supporting role and was the next to last silent version of the play, the last being released in 1926 starring Dolores Costello. The Third Degree is now considered to be a lost film.

== Plot ==
As described in a film magazine, Howard Jeffries Sr. (Randolf) marries again, and the film reveals that the new Mrs. Howard Jeffries Sr. (Hopper) and Robert Underwood (Evans), the rather fast college roommate of Howard Jeffries Jr. (James), had been more than just friends. Howard Jr. marries Annie Sands (Joyce), who had been a lovely waitress in the college town. When the father hears who the bride is, there is a flare up and the young couple leaves the house. Underwood opens a curio store, but loses money that does not belong to him. He writes to Mrs. Jeffries Sr. and says that if she does not come to him, he will shoot himself. Howard Jr. remembers that Underwood owes him some money and goes to collect it, but there gets drunk and passes out on the sofa. Underwood hides him, and Mrs. Jeffries Sr. arrives and tells Underwood that she will have nothing to do with him. After she leaves, Underwood shoots and kills himself. This sound awakes Howard Jr., who is captured by the police and, under the hypnotic strain of the third degree, confesses to murder. When it is learned that a young woman had called on Underwood, the police try to pin the crime on Annie. She suspects that it was the other Mrs. Jeffries, and gets her to provide evidence to show that it was a suicide, but, to protect her fellow relative, Annie allows the police to believe that she had made the visit. After the trial, Howard Sr. still wants to end his son's marriage on the sly, but a lawyer who is a family friend convinces Mrs. Jeffries Sr. to confess to her husband, and the family conflicts are resolved.

== Cast ==
- Alice Joyce – Annie Sands
- Gladden James – Howard Jeffries Jr.
- Anders Randolf – Howard Jeffries Sr.
- Hedda Hopper – Mrs. Howard Jeffries Sr.
- Herbert Evans – Robert Underwood
- George Backus – Richard Brewster
- John P. Wade – Dr. Thompson
- L. Rogers Lytton – Captain Clinton
- Edward McGuire – Sergeant Maloney
- Alfred Fisher
