= Another Scandal =

1924 film by Edward H. Griffith

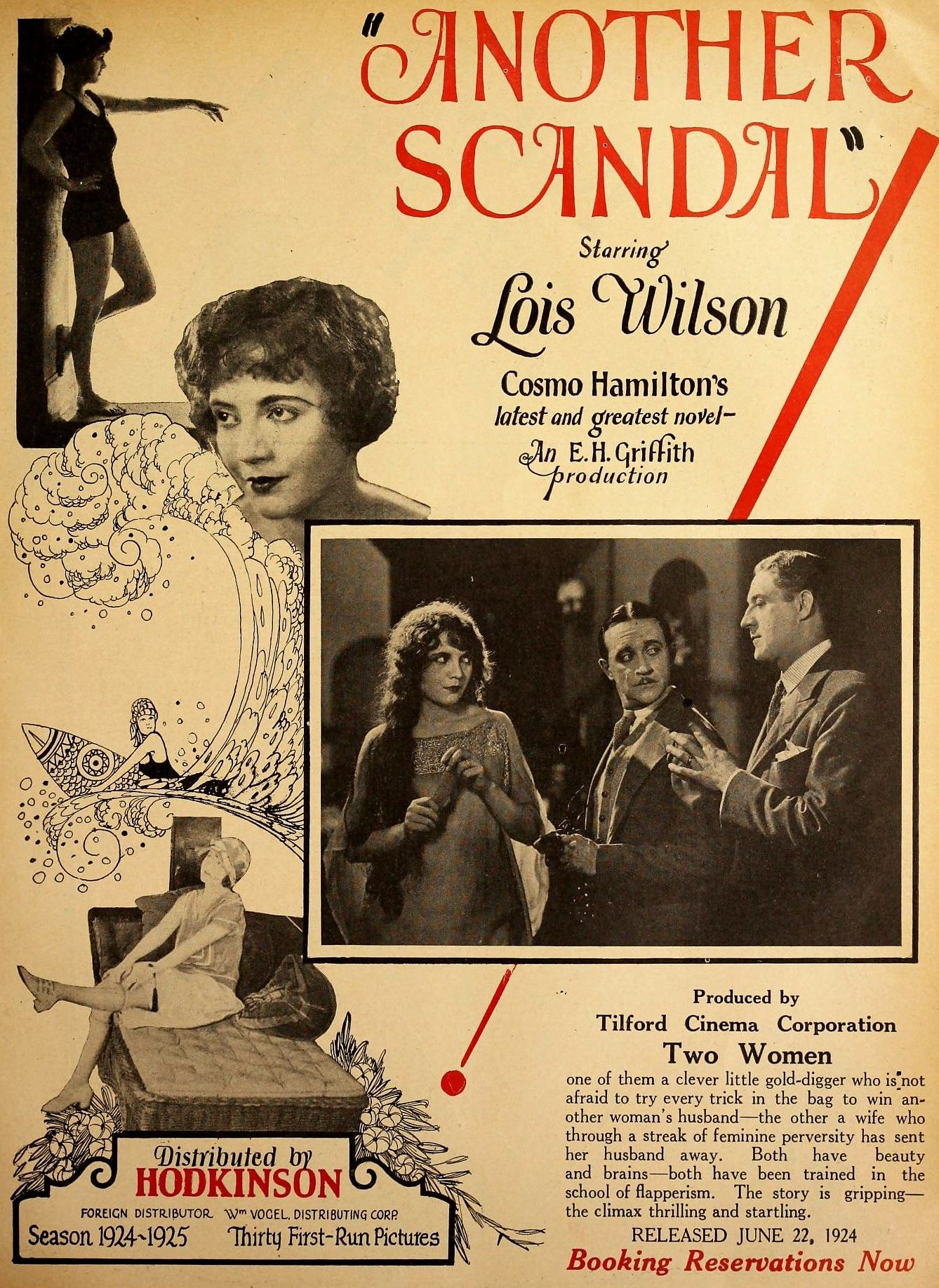
- Directed by: Edward H. Griffith
- Written by: G. Marion Burton (scenario)
- Based on: Another Scandal by Cosmo Hamilton
- Starring: Lois Wilson; Holmes Herbert
- Cinematography: Dal Clawson
- Production company: Tilford Cinema Corporation
- Distributed by: W. W. Hodkinson Corporation; Producers Distributing Corporation
- Release date: June 22, 1924
- Running time: 80 minutes
- Country: United States
- Language: Silent (English intertitles)

Another Scandal is a 1924 American silent drama film directed by Edward H. Griffith and distributed by W. W. Hodkinson. Based on a 1923 novel Another Scandal by Cosmo Hamilton, the film stars Lois Wilson and Holmes Herbert.

== Plot ==
As described in a review in a film magazine, Beatrice Vanderdyke is found in the bedroom of a total stranger and, to avoid a scandal, she agrees to marry Pelham Franklin. To bring her to a realization of her position, the husband makes her believe he will force her to live up to her part of the marital contract. A year later finds them happy, the wife expecting the birth of a baby. Pel is so nervous that Bee persuades him to go on a cruise on a yacht. May Beamish, a pretty grass widow (a divorced woman or former mistress), uses all her wiles to vamp him but fails. Bee is jealous and, after the birth of the baby, she decides to make Pel jealous by going out with a former suitor, Alec Greenwood. Pel becomes enraged, decides he is too old for Bee and leaves. On the train he meets May and loans her his New York apartment. Bee determines to fight for Pel’s love and it becomes a battle of wits between the two women. May finally frames a situation where she will have her hired detectives find her in a compromising situation with Pel, but Bee learns of this and cleverly turns the tables. She and Pel become reconciled while May admits failure.

== Cast ==
- Lois Wilson as Beatrice Vanderdyke
- Holmes Herbert as Pelham Franklin
- Flora le Breton as Mrs. May Beamish
- Hedda Hopper as Cousin Elizabeth MacKenzie
- Ralph Bunker as Mally
- Zeffie Tilbury as Brownie
- Ralph W. Chambers as Valentine Beamish
- Bigelow Cooper as Mitchell Burrows
- Allan Simpson as Alec Greenwood
- Harry Gripp as 'Arry' Arris

== Preservation ==
With no copies of Another Scandal located in any film archives, it is a lost film.

== See also ==
- Scandal (1917)
