= Ramshackle House =

1924 film

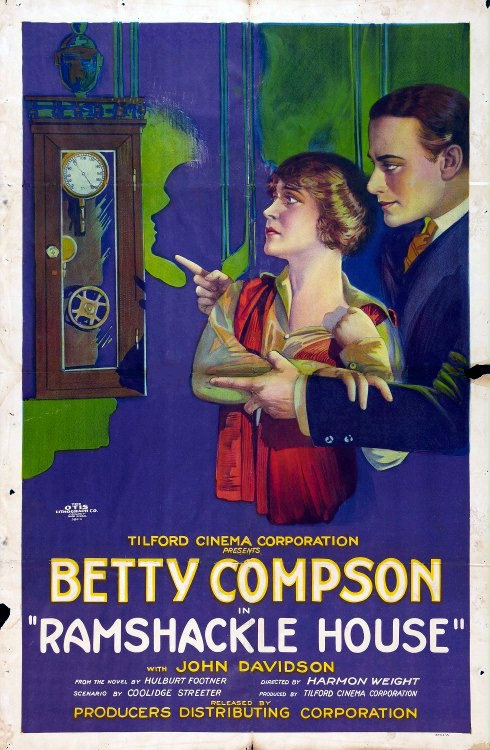
- Film poster
- Directed by: F. Harmon Weight
- Written by: Coolidge Streeter (scenario)
- Based on: Ramshackle House by Hulbert Footner
- Produced by: Tilford Cinema Corporation
- Starring: Betty Compson
- Cinematography: Larry Williams; Bert Wilson
- Distributed by: Producers Distributing Corporation
- Release date: August 31, 1924
- Running time: 6 reels
- Country: United States
- Language: Silent (English intertitles)

Ramshackle House is a 1924 American silent romantic drama film directed by F. Harmon Weight and starring Betty Compson. It was adapted for the screen by Coolidge Streeter from the novel of the same name by Hulbert Footner. The film was shot at Tilford's studio in Miami. It was released by Producers Distributing Corporation (PDC).

== Cast ==
- Betty Compson as Pen Broome
- Robert Lowing as Don Counsell
- John Davidson as Ernest Riever
- Henry James as Pendleton Broome
- William Black as Keesing
- Duke Pelzer as Spike Talley
- Josephine Norman as Blanche Paglar
- Joey Joey as Alligator Wrestler

== Preservation ==
Ramshackle House is currently presumed lost. In February of 2021, the film was cited by the National Film Preservation Board on their Lost U.S. Silent Feature Films list.
