= Corse Payton =

American actor theatrical producer (1866–1943)

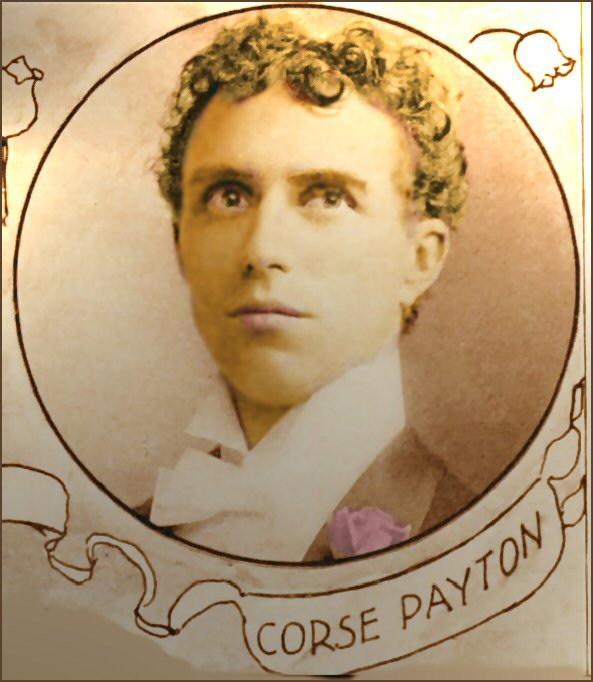
Corse Payton

Corse Payton (18 December 1866, Centerville, Iowa – 23 February 1934 Brooklyn, New York) was an American actor and theatre impresario who famously billed himself as "The World's Best Bad Actor". Predominantly a stage actor, he established his own stock theatre company at the age of 16 with whom he spent years performing throughout the mid-western and Western parts of the United States. This organization included several actors from his family such as his brother Claude Payton and his niece Edna May Spooner.

Payton ultimately settled with his stock company in Brooklyn where his company was in residence during the first three decades of the 20th century. Several famous actors spent their early careers with his company, including Mary Pickford, William R. Dunn, Dorothy Gish, Lillian Gish, Fay Bainter, Bert Lytell, Della Pringle, and Sidney Toler among others. This period ended in 1925 after he came into a dispute with the Actors' Equity Association which effectively barred his appearance on the New York stage.

Shortly before his death, Payton starred in Universal Pictures 1933 short film Supper at Six. His first marriage to the actress Etta Reed ended upon her death in 1915. His second marriage was to the actress Henrietta Brown who survived him.
