= Tilford Cinema Corporation =

Defunct American film studio

- Company type: Private
- Industry: Film production
- Founded: 1920; 105 years ago
- Founders: Walter Ford Tilford; Thomas W. Switzler
- Defunct: 1920s
- Headquarters: New York, New York, United States
- Products: Motion pictures

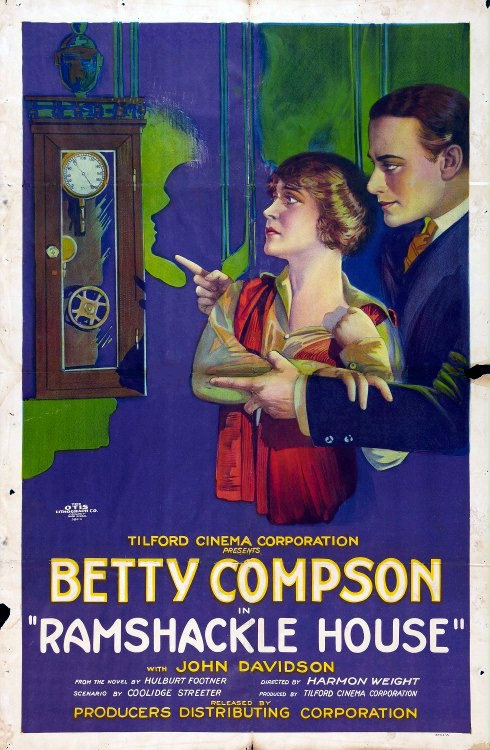
Poster for Ramshackle House

Tilford Cinema Corporation, also known as Tilford Cinema Studios, was a film studio headquartered in New York City with studio operations in Miami, Florida. Founded in 1920, it was an early adopter of the studio-for-hire contracting system. The company ceased production by the mid-1920s after a brief period of success.

== History ==
The business was established in 1920 and was led by Walter Ford Tilford and Thomas W. Switzler. An ad for its services ran in a 1921 edition of Wid's Yearbook. It was a pioneer in the studio for hire contracting system.

The company provided sets and studio space for films such as The Purple Highway. Tilford used Miami Studios buildings for production.

In 1922, the company bought out Gotham Pictures. Wiard Boppo Ihnen later became part owner and secretary.

Despite initial optimism following the release of several financially successful films in 1924, the company ran short of financing and ceased production.

== Filmography ==
- Slim Shoulders (1922)
- Destiny's Isle (1922)
- Another Scandal (1924), based on the Cosmo Hamilton novel
- Miami (1924)
- Ramshackle House (1924)
