= The Truth About Women (1924 film) =

1924 film directed by Burton L. King

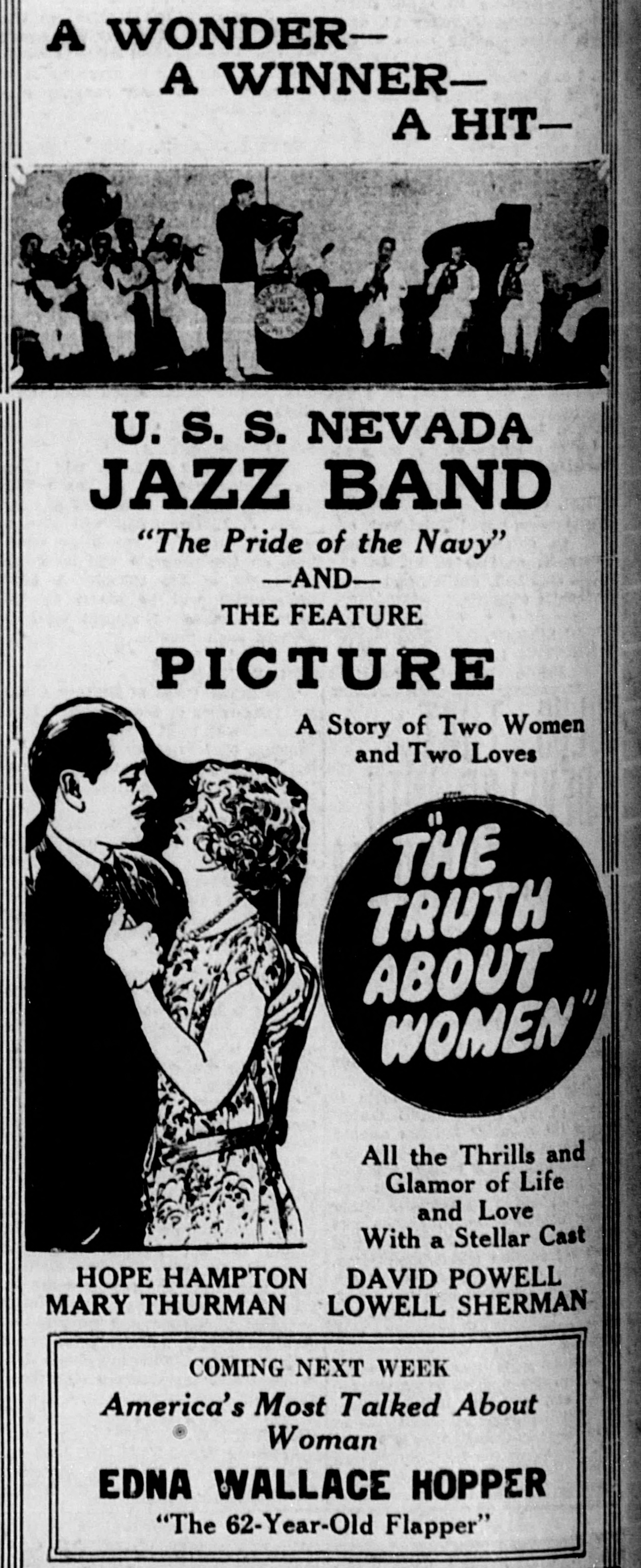
- Contemporary advertisement
- Directed by: Burton L. King
- Written by: Leota Morgan
- Produced by: Banner Productions
- Starring: Hope Hampton; Lowell Sherman
- Cinematography: Charles Davis; Edward Paul
- Distributed by: Banner Films
- Release date: July 1, 1924
- Running time: 6 reeler
- Country: USA
- Language: Silent...English intertitles

The Truth About Women is a lost 1924 American silent film drama directed by Burton King and starring Hope Hampton and Lowell Sherman.

== Cast ==
- Hope Hampton - Hilda Carr
- Lowell Sherman - Warren Carr
- David Powell - Howard Bronson
- Mary Thurman - Nona Boyd
- Dainty Lee - Blossom Carr
- Louise Carter - Bronson's mother
- Charles Craig - Smead
- Rosella Ray - Molly
- Warren Cook - Jack
- Charles Edwards - Fred
- Augusta Carey - Florence
