= Edward Earle =

Canadian-American actor (1882–1972)

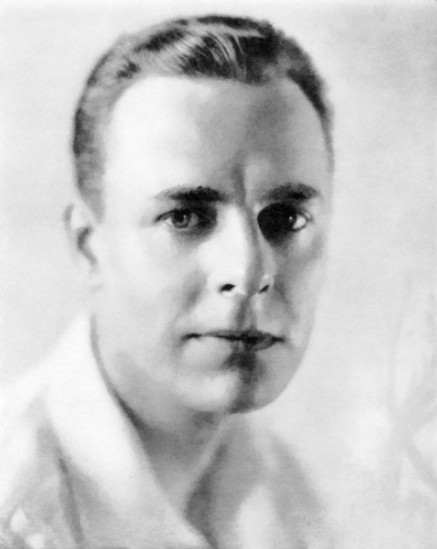
- Earle c. 1920
- Born: 16 July 1882; Toronto, Ontario, Canada
- Died: 15 December 1972 (aged 90); Los Angeles, California, United States
- Occupation: Actor
- Years active: 1914–1966

Edward Earle (16 July 1882 – 15 December 1972) was a Canadian-American stage, film and television actor. In a career which lasted from the 1910s to 1966, he appeared in almost 400 films between 1914 and 1956. He was born in Toronto and died in Los Angeles, aged 90.

== Partial filmography ==
Film
Year	Title	Role	Notes
1913	An Hour Before Dawn	Professor Wallace-the Inventor	
1915	Through Turbulent Waters	Frank Wentworth	
1915	Eugene Aram	Walter Lester	
1915	Ranson's Folly	Lieutenant Ranson	
1916	The Innocence of Ruth	Jimmy Carter	
1916	The Light of Happiness	Lowell Van Orden	
1916	The Gates of Eden	Rodney	
1917	The Great Bradley Mystery	Collier	
1917	God's Man	Archie Hartogensis	
1917	The Beautiful Lie	Paul Vivian	
1917	For France	Edward Ackland	
1918	The Blind Adventure	Geoffrey West	
1918	The Little Runaway	Lord Killowen	
1918	One Thousand Dollars	Eddie Gillian	
1919	His Bridal Night	Joe Damorel	
1919	The Miracle of Love	Howard McClintock	
1920	The Law of the Yukon	Morgan Kleath	
1921	Passion Fruit	Pierce Lamont	
1921	East Lynne	Archibald Carlyle	
1922	The Streets of New York	Paul Fairweather	
1922	False Fronts	Keith Drummond	
1923	None So Blind	Sheldon Sherman	
1924	Gambling Wives	Vincent Forrest	
1924	The Family Secret	Gary Holmes	
1924	The Dangerous Flirt	Dick Morris	Lost film
1925	Her Market Value	Anthony Davis	
1925	Why Women Love	Ira Meers	
1926	The Greater Glory	Otto Steiner	
1926	A Woman's Heart	Ralph Deane	
1926	A Captain's Courage		
1927	Twelve Miles Out	John Burton	
1928	Runaway Girls	Varden	
1928	The Wind	Beverly	
1929	Spite Marriage	Lionel Benmore	
1929	Smiling Irish Eyes	Ralph Prescott	
1929	The Hottentot	Larry Crawford	
1930	Second Honeymoon	Jim Huntley	
1931	A Woman of Experience	Captain Kurt von Hausen	
1931	Forgotten Women	Sleek Moran	
1934	Mystery Mountain	Frank Blayden	
1935	The Miracle Rider	Christopher Adams	
1935	Grand Exit	Optics expert	
1935	Super Speed	Holmes	
1935	The Revenge Rider	Kramer	
1936	Wives Never Know	Mr. Lawyer	
1936	Headline Crasher	Atwood	
1937	Artists and Models	Flunky	
1938	Her Jungle Love	Captain Avery	
1938	Riders of the Black Hills	Race Track Steward	
1938	The Marines Are Here	Lieutenant Drake	
1938	The Headleys at Home	Van Wyck Schuyler	
1940	The Secret Seven	Twine Company Manager	
1941	Scattergood Baines	Crane	
1943	Alaska Highway	Blair Caswell	
1943	What a Woman	Livingstone	
1944	Detective Kitty O'Day	Oliver M. Wentworth	
1944	I Accuse My Parents	Judge	
1946	Dark Alibi	Thomas Harley	
1946	The Devil's Mask	E. R. Willard	
1948	Command Decision	Congressman Watson	
1956	Never Say Goodbye	Colonel Wasburn	
1956	Francis in the Haunted House	Professor Anderson	
1956	The She-Creature	Professor Anderson	
1956	The Ten Commandments	Slave (uncredited)	

Television
Year	Title	Role	Notes
1953–1956	You Are There	Charles G. Ross/General Macy/President Woodrow Wilson/Mr Hale	4 episodes
1954	I Led Three Lives	Randall Milton	"Rest Home" (season 2, episode 15)
1954	Annie Oakley	Priest	"Annie Trusts a Convict" (season 1, episode 2)
1954	My Little Margie	Dr. Farrell	"Vern's Winter Vacation" (season 4, episode 13)
1955	Science Fiction Theatre	Dr. Joel Kerwin	"Sound of Murder" (season 1, episode 37)
1956	Broken Arrow	Secretary of Interior	"The Conspirators" (season 1, episode 11)
1958	M Squad	Doctor	"The Chicago Bluebeard" (season 1, episode 25)
1960	The Texan	Mr Mead	"The Nomad" (season 2, episode 32)
1966	Camera Three	Man I	"In Search of Ezra Pound: Part 1" (season 11, episode 22)
