= Slim Shoulders =

1922 film by Alan Crosland

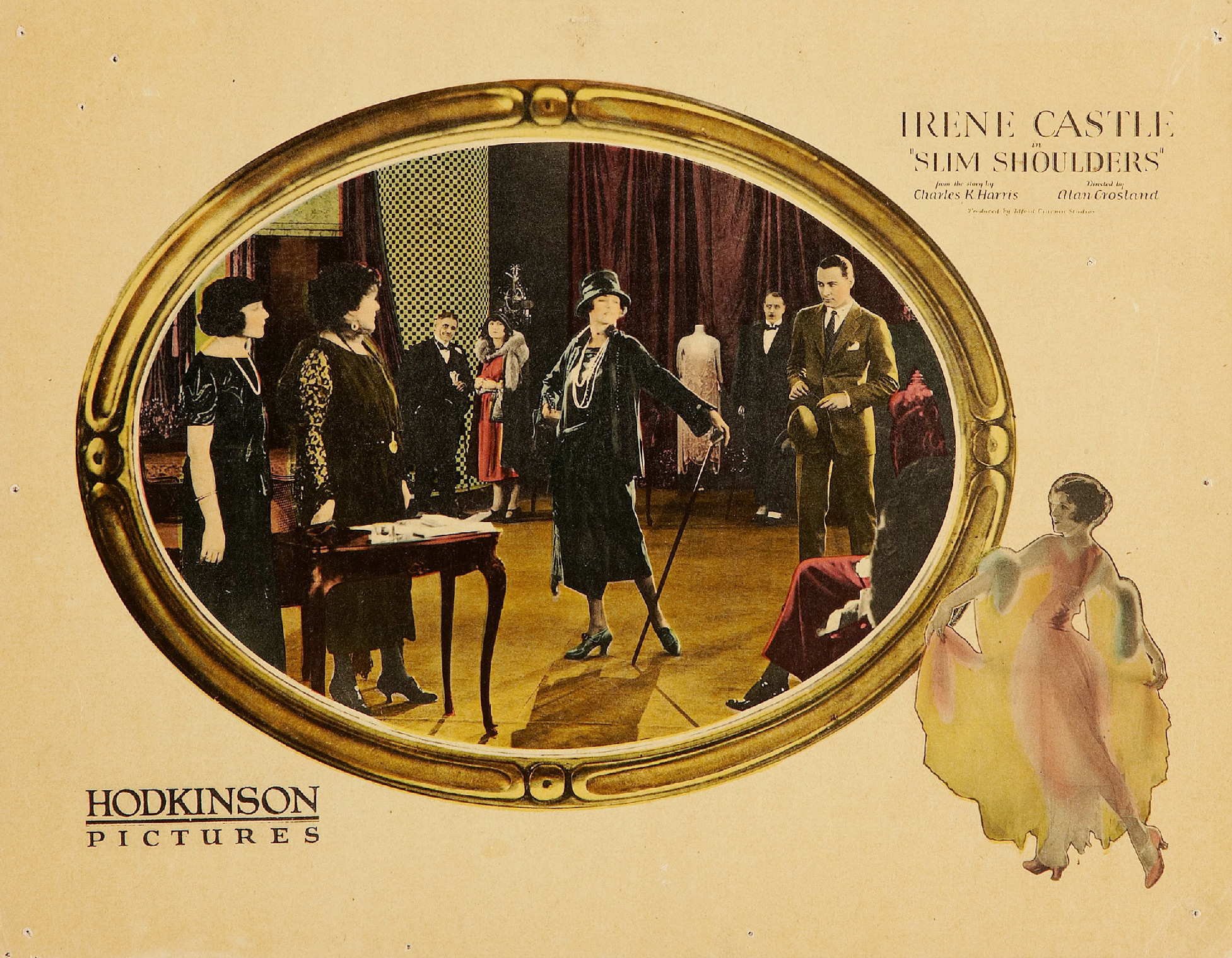
- Lobby card
- Directed by: Alan Crosland
- Written by: Lawrence McCloskey (scenario); Charles K. Harris (story)
- Produced by: Tilford Cinema Studios
- Starring: Irene Castle; Rod La Rocque
- Cinematography: George J. Folsey
- Distributed by: W. W. Hodkinson Corporation
- Release date: September 24, 1922
- Running time: 7 reels
- Country: USA
- Language: Silent..English titles

Slim Shoulders is a 1922 silent society drama film directed by Alan Crosland and starring Irene Castle and Rod La Rocque.

== Cast ==
- Irene Castle - Naomi Warren
- Rod La Rocque - Richard Langden
- Anders Randolf - Edward Langden
- Warren Cook - John Clinton Warren
- Mario Carillo - Count Giulo Morranni
- Marie Burke - Mrs. Warren

== Preservation ==
In February 2021, Slim Shoulders was cited by the National Film Preservation Board on their Lost U.S. Silent Feature Films list and is therefore presumed lost.
