= Kathleen Kerrigan (actress) =

American actress

Kathleen Kerrigan (circa 1869 - January 17, 1957) was an American actress on stage and in the early years of films.

== Early years ==
The daughter of John Kerrigan and Sarah McLean Kerrigan, she was born in Louisville, Kentucky, but moved with her family to New Albany, Indiana. Her brothers were actor J. Warren Kerrigan and film executive Wallace W. Kerrigan.

== Career ==
Kerrigan's professional acting debut came on January 8, 1891, at Macauley's Theatre in Louisville, when she played the title role in Lady of Lyons and Galatea in Pygmaleon and Galatea. Soon after that, she became leading lady for Frank Mayo in his plays. Following three seasons with Mayo, she joined the Abbot and Teal troupe. Later, she acted with Robert Mantell in performances of Shakspeare's plays. Her Broadway plays included Laugh, Clown, Laugh! (1923), Everywoman (1911), The New Dominion (1906), and Sam Houston (1906).

Kerrigan's film debut came in No. 99, with her brother as the star.

== Personal life ==
In 1894, Kerrigan married Morton J. Stevenson, an attorney. Following the marriage, Stevenson "abandoned his clubs, politics and a remunerative practice" and "took to the stage in order to follow the actress around." Despite such devotion, the couple divorced on September 5, 1906. On September 8, 1906, Kerrigan eloped with actor Clay Clement, and the two were married in St. Joseph, Missouri. They remained wed until his death in 1910. Some years after Clement's death, Kerrigan lived with actress Lenore Ulric for at least a decade.

== Death ==
On January 27, 1957, Kerrigan died at age 88.
