= After the Show =

After the Show may refer to:

- "After the Show" (CSI), a 2003 episode of CSI: Crime Scene Investigation
- "After the Show" (song), a 1974 song by Kevin Ayers
- After the Show (film), a 1921 American silent film directed by William C. deMille

== See also ==
- The After Show
