= One of Many =

One of Many may refer to:

- One of Many (film), 1917
- One of Many (Kenny Wheeler album) 2011
- One of Many (Eric Lau album) 2013
