= Frances Nelson (actress) =

American silent film actress

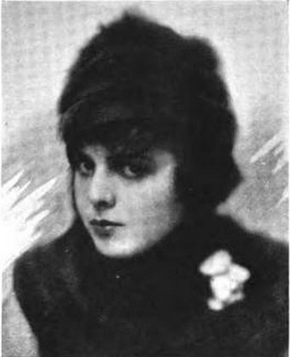
Nelson featured in 1916 publication

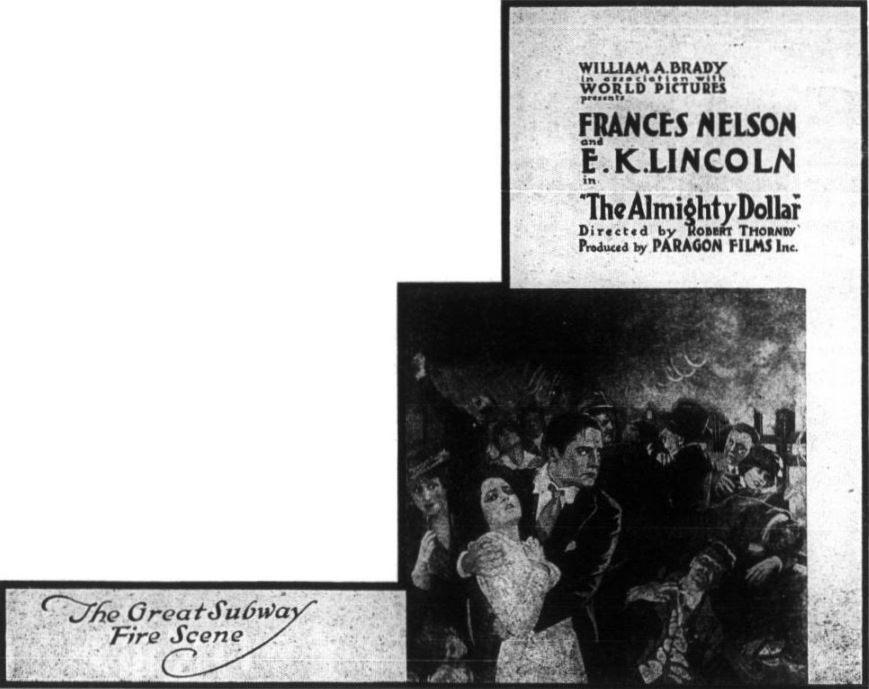
Advertisement depicting Nelson and E.K. Lincoln in The Almighty Dollar (1916)

Frances Maude Nelson (November 7, 1892, in St. Paul, Minnesota – January 1975 in The Bronx, New York) was an American silent film actress.

Frances Maude Nelson was born in St. Paul, Minnesota, in 1891 or 1892. When she "was still a wee wisp of a girl" her family moved to Boston. She was educated there until her parents died. Her changed circumstances led her to act on stage, which she had not previously considered as a career.

In her stage debut Nelson portrayed Florence Lang in The Wife Hunters, by Lew Fields. After that she acted in stock theater companies in Philadelphia and Indianapolis before she became the lead in the western company of Ready Money. She subsequently had a leading role in The Silver Wedding for Tom Wise's company.

A review of the film The Stolen Voice (1915) said, "Frances Nelson is very engaging in the role of the shopgirl who becomes an actress".

In 1918 Nelson was awarded $16,500 as the result of a lawsuit against Superpicture Distributing Corporation (SDC). Her $500-per-week contract required her to maintain a weight no greater than 110 pounds; SDC released her, saying that her weight reached 123 pounds. She was clothed when she was weighed at the time of her dismissal. Nelson's suit said that SDC's accusation was a pretense, with the real reason for her release being the company's failure to have a film in which she could appear. The court decided in her favor after employees of a Turkish bath where she was a regular customer testified that on the day of her discharge "she weighed 110 in the altogether".

== Selected filmography ==
- The Country Girl (1915) directed by Clem Easton, also starring George Bailey, Jim O'Neill.
- Love's Crucible (1916)
- Human Driftwood (1916)
- The Decoy (1916)
- The Almighty Dollar (1916)
- One of Many (1917)
- The Beautiful Lie (1917)
- The Power of Decision (1917)
