= The Beautiful Lie (film) =

1917 American silent drama film directed by John W. Noble

- Directed by: John W. Noble
- Written by: June Mathis
- Based on: the poem, "Reveries of a Station House" by Ella Wheeler Wilcox
- Starring: Frances Nelson; Harry S. Northrup; Edward Earle
- Cinematography: Herbert O. Carleton
- Production companies: Metro Pictures; Rolfe Photoplays
- Release date: May 21, 1917 (US)
- Running time: 5 reels
- Country: United States
- Language: English

The Beautiful Lie is a 1917 American silent drama film, directed by John W. Noble. It stars Frances Nelson, Harry S. Northrup, and Edward Earle, and was released on May 21, 1917. It tells the tale of a woman whose reputation is sullied, and then recovered. It received mostly positive reviews, and the performances by the three stars were all given high marks for their work, particularly Nelson. As of 2025, it is considered a lost film.

== Plot ==
Frances Nelson works for architect Mortimer Grierson, who desires her. He tricks her into a false marriage so that he can have her. When he tires of her, he begins seeing Elsie MacLeod, among others. One night he returns from one of his assignations, and Frances and he fight, during which he lets her know that the marriage was a fraud. He deserts her, after which she can only find work as an artist's model, due to her lack of skills and the fact that she is seen as a fallen woman. She is hardened mentally while working for the artist, but manages to not succumb to his sexual advances.

Shortly after, she meets another artist, Paul Vivian, and the two begin a romantic relationship. However, Paul is a protégé of Mortimer, and when the elder man learns of Frances' new relationship, he tries to throw a wedge between them by telling Paul that Frances was his mistress. Disillusioned, he does not wait to hear Frances' side of the story, and leaves.

In a jealous rage one night due to his continued philandering, Elsie shoots Mortimer, mortally wounding him. Still angry that Frances has gone on with her life, he tells police that she is the one who shot him, and she is arrested. As he lingers on his deathbed, his nephew, Howard Hayes, returns to his side, where he reveals that the marriage to Frances was in fact legal. He had been miffed at his uncle, and had actually secured a real preacher to perform the ceremony. He urges his uncle to set things right while he still can. Mortimer calls for his attorney to get his affairs in order before he dies. In doing so, he bequests a sum to Frances to ensure her financial security, and sends a letter to Paul, letting him know the truth. Then he dies.

The truth is revealed to the police and Frances is released. Paul returns and the two are reconciled.

== Cast list ==
- Frances Nelson as Louise Joyce
- Harry S. Northrup as Mortimer Grierson
- Edward Earle as Paul Vivian
- Elsie MacLeod as The other girl
- Sally Crute as Mary
- John Davidson as Howard Hayes
- Mrs. Allan Walker as Mrs. Joyce
- Emile Collins as Butler

== Production ==
In January 1917, Metro announced that The Beautiful Lie would be one of their slate of pictures for 1917, scheduled for release on March 12. By February it was known that Frances Nelson would be starring in the movie, and it was based on the poem "Reveries of a Station House" by Ella Wheeler Wilcox. The film was not ready for its projected release date, which in April was pushed back to May 27, however in early May, the release date was moved up to May 21. In mid-May it was revealed that June Mathis was adapting the poem to the screen and John W. Noble was the director. At the same time, the cast was revealed to include Edward Earle, Harry S. Northrup, John Davidson, Sally Crute, Mrs. Allan Walker, and Emil Collins.

== Release and reception ==
The film was released on May 21, 1917. Motion Picture News gave the film a good review, calling it a very human story with a "lesson which will never be forgotten". They paid specific accolades to Nelson, stating she portrayed her character "with a realism so strong in its appeal that you are brought for a time to the very environments of the story and as an intensely interested bystander wonder at the weaknesses of some and the strength of others. Motography gave the film mixed reviews. While they were impressed with the acting of the main and supporting characters, they were underwhelmed by Noble's direction, calling it simply "adequate". Their biggest issue was with the plot, which at times they felt highly improbable. They said that Nelson's performance "registers excellently throughout," and that Northrup performed his role as the film's villain "to perfection". They also highlighted the work of Earle, who they felt made a "big impression" as the young artist. Moving Picture World also gave the film a positive review, saying that the story was set forth in a "...rational and entertaining manner throughout..." They praised Nelson's performance, and gave good marks to the rest of the cast as well.

== Censorship ==
Initially, The Beautiful Lie was rejected in its entirety by the Kansas Board of Review, but upon review it was passed with cuts. The scenes removed were of a woman drinking at a piano and opening scene on a yacht.

== Notes ==
As of 2019, it was still listed in the Library of Congress as a lost film.
