= George Anderson (actor) =

American actor (1886–1948)

- Born: March 6, 1886; New York City, U.S.
- Died: August 26, 1948 (aged 62); London, England
- Occupation: actor
- Years active: 1915–1948

George Anderson (March 6, 1886 – August 26, 1948) was an American stage and film actor who appeared in 74 films and 25 Broadway productions in his 34-year career.

== Career ==
Born in New York City in 1886, Anderson made his Broadway debut on August 5, 1907, as the star of an original musical called The Time, the Place and the Girl. For the next ten years he continued to perform on the Great White Way in both musicals and plays – including Victor Herbert's The Duchess – until the end of November 1917. During about this same period, he also appeared in six movies, from 1915 to 1918, at a time when the nascent film industry was largely located in the New York City area.

From 1922 to 1924 and from 1927 to 1936, Anderson again appeared on Broadway in musicals, comedies and melodramas, including The Strawberry Blonde, which he also directed, frequently with about a year between each production, time during which it would be the normal procedure of the period for the production to tour the country. Anderson appeared in two short films released in 1935 and 1936, when the film industry had largely relocated to California and become known as "Hollywood".

After 1937, until 1948, Anderson worked consistently in films, playing small parts such as policemen, prison wardens, government officials, doctors and businessmen, as well as the occasional worker or bartender. During this time Anderson became part of writer-director Preston Sturges' unofficial "stock company" of character actors, appearing in six films written and directed by Sturges, as well as one Sturges wrote but did not direct. In 1944, he returned to Broadway for the last time, performing in Mae West's Catherine Was Great.

Anderson's final film was Cy Endfield's The Argyle Secrets, released in 1948. He died in London, England on August 26, 1948, at the age of 62.

== Partial filmography ==
- Little Pal (1915) - John Grandon
- The Question (1916) - Ralph Tudor
- The Shadow of a Doubt (1916) - John Randolph
- The Almighty Dollar (1916) - Dr. Thornton
- The Co-Respondent (1917) - Howard Van Keel
- Her Man (1918) - Roger Malcom
- Night of Mystery (1937) - Det. Snitkin (uncredited)
- Hotel Haywire (1937) - Bartender (uncredited)
- Under Suspicion (1937) - Bill
- Born to Be Wild (1938) - Mayor
- The Saint in New York (1938) - Bonacci (uncredited)
- King of Alcatraz (1938) - Officer #3 (uncredited)
- Crime Takes a Holiday (1938) - Minor Role (uncredited)
- King of Chinatown (1939) - Detective
- The Lady's from Kentucky (1939) - Joe Lane
- Union Pacific (1939) - Railwayman (uncredited)
- Undercover Doctor (1939) - Dr. Parsons (uncredited)
- They All Come Out (1939) - Associate Warden (uncredited)
- Million Dollar Legs (1939) - State College President Greene (uncredited)
- Behind Prison Gates (1939) - State Atty. Gen. Matthews (uncredited)
- The Man They Could Not Hang (1939) - Prison Warden (uncredited)
- A Woman Is the Judge (1939) - Detective (uncredited)
- Our Neighbors – The Carters (1939) - Drug Representative (uncredited)
- Chip of the Flying U (1939) - Foreign Agent (uncredited)
- The Earl of Chicago (1940) - Prison Guard (uncredited)
- Santa Fe Marshal (1940) - Tex Barnes
- Women Without Names (1940) - Juror (uncredited)
- The Way of All Flesh (1940) - Minor Role (uncredited)
- Hidden Gold (1940) - Ward Ackerman
- The Great McGinty (1940) - Charlie - Cashier (uncredited)
- Golden Gloves (1940) - Doctor (uncredited)
- The Secret Seven (1940) - Bennett
- Glamour for Sale (1940) - Chief of Police (uncredited)
- The Quarterback (1940) - Doctor (uncredited)
- Christmas in July (1940) - Mr. Jenkins (uncredited)
- Hold Back the Dawn (1941) - Emmy's Doctor (uncredited)
- Sullivan's Travels (1941) - Sullivan's Ex-Manager (uncredited)
- South of Santa Fe (1942) - Reed - Lawyer (uncredited)
- Reap the Wild Wind (1942) - Jailer (uncredited)
- This Gun for Hire (1942) - Plainclothesman (uncredited)
- The Palm Beach Story (1942) - The Gent (uncredited)
- The Major and the Minor (1942) - Train Passenger with Esquire Magazine (uncredited)
- Idaho (1943) - Board Member (uncredited)
- Dixie (1943) - Publisher (uncredited)
- The Underdog (1943) - Kraeger
- The Chance of a Lifetime (1943) - Warden J.A. Edwards (uncredited)
- Henry Aldrich Haunts a House (1943) - Olin Bidecker (uncredited)
- Destination Tokyo (1943) - Officer (uncredited)
- Henry Aldrich Plays Cupid (1944) - Mr. Benton (uncredited)
- Once Upon a Time (1944) - Businessman (uncredited)
- The Great Moment (1944) - Frederick T. Johnson (uncredited)
- Wilson (1944) - Secretary David F. Houston (uncredited)
- Hail the Conquering Hero (1944) - Bartender (uncredited)
- The Missing Juror (1944) - Wharton Attorney (uncredited)
- Murder, My Sweet (1944) - Detective (uncredited)
- Those Endearing Young Charms (1945) - Doorman (uncredited)
- The Unseen (1945) - Plainclothesman (uncredited)
- Nob Hill (1945) - Rafferty (uncredited)
- Shady Lady (1945) - Conductor (uncredited)
- Mildred Pierce (1945) - Peterson's Assistant (uncredited)
- Road to Utopia (1945) - Townsman (uncredited)
- Masquerade in Mexico (1945) - Customs Official (uncredited)
- Because of Him (1946) - Detective (uncredited)
- The Bride Wore Boots (1946) - Judge #1 (uncredited)
- The Killers (1946) - Jail Ward Doctor (uncredited)
- California (1947) - Miner (uncredited)
- My Brother Talks to Horses (1947) - Judge (uncredited)
- Blaze of Noon (1947) - Doctor (uncredited)
- Desperate (1947) - Man on Train (uncredited)
- The Perils of Pauline (1947) - Western Saloon Set Director (uncredited)
- Song of the Thin Man (1947) - Dunne (uncredited)
- Unconquered (1947) - Villager (uncredited)
- My Wild Irish Rose (1947) - Plainclothesman (uncredited)
- King of the Gamblers (1948) - O'Brien
- The Argyle Secrets (1948) - Allen Pierce
