= Frederick Vroom =

Canadian actor (1857–1942)

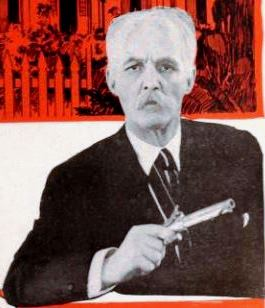
- Vroom in promotion of The Kentucky Colonel in the Exhibitors Herald, 1920
- Born: 11 November 1857; Clementsport, Nova Scotia, British North America
- Died: 24 June 1942 (aged 84); Hollywood, California, US
- Occupation: Actor
- Years active: 1915–1935

Frederick Vroom (11 November 1857 – 24 June 1942) was a Canadian actor of the silent film era. Vroom appeared in more than 70 films between 1912 and 1939, mostly in supporting roles and bit parts. He played featured roles in Buster Keaton's films The Navigator (1924) and The General (1926). He was born in Clementsport, Nova Scotia, Canada and died in Hollywood, California from a heart attack.

== Partial filmography ==
- A Ticket to Red Horse Gulch (1914, Short) as Bill Salter, the Old Miner
- A Gentleman of Leisure (1915) as Macklin, Pitt's friend
- Fighting Bob (1915) as President
- The Invisible Enemy (1916) as Governor Webster
- The Jungle Child (1916) as Seqor Grijalva
- The Serpent's Tooth (1917) as Matthew Addison-Brown
- The Shackles of Truth (1917) as Governor Coningsby
- New York Luck (1917) as Peter Van Loon
- The Gown of Destiny (1917) as Sir John Cunningham
- Betty Takes a Hand (1918) as Peter Marshall
- I Love You (1918) as Prince del Chinay
- Little Red Decides (1918)
- Restitution (1918) as Joseph
- High Tide (1918) as Dr. Temple
- She Hired a Husband (1918) as Mr. Trowbridge
- Fighting Through (1919) as Braxton Warren
- Secret Marriage (1919) as Lieutenant MacLaren
- Where the West Begins (1919) as Luther Caldwell
- The Island of Intrigue (1919) as Tomas Waring
- Devil McCare (1919) as Vera's Father
- One of the Finest (1919) as Robert Fulton Hudson
- Upstairs (1919) as James Barrison
- The Beloved Cheater (1917) as Mr. Challoner
- The Prince of Avenue A (1920) as William Tompkins
- The Triflers (1920) as Janet's Father
- The Six Best Cellars (1920) as Mrs. Teak
- A Tokyo Siren (1920) as Mr. Chandler
- The Misfit Wife (1920) as Dr. Morton
- The Kentucky Colonel (1920) as General Buck Hineman
- The Marriage Pit (1920) as Edwin Rossiter
- 813 (1920) as Prefect of Police
- The Great Lover (1920) as Doctor
- The Faith Healer (1921) as Matthew Beeler
- White and Unmarried (1921) as Mr. Welter
- The Heart Line (1921) as Oliver Payson
- The Great Impersonation (1921) as Prince Terniloff
- The Millionaire (1921) as Delmar
- The Lane That Had No Turning (1922) as Governor General
- The Fourteenth Lover (1922) as Mr. Marchmont
- The Man of Courage (1922) as Morgan Deane
- The Primitive Lover (1922) as Mr. Graham
- The Woman Who Walked Alone (1922) as Marquis of Champneys
- A Tailor-Made Man (1922) as Harvey Benson
- The Glorious Fool (1922) as Mr. Lindley Grant
- The Tiger's Claw (1923) as Colonel Byng
- The Day of Faith (1923) as Marley Maynard
- The Acquittal (1923) as Carter Ames
- Sporting Youth (1924) as John K. Walker
- Phantom Justice (1924) as Dr. Wills
- The Reckless Age (1924) as Owen Jephson
- Hutch of the U.S.A. (1924) as Grover Harrison
- His Hour (1924) as English Minister
- The Navigator (1924) as John O'Brien (uncredited)
- Idaho (1925) as David Cameron
- Eyes Right! (1926) as Col. Thomas A. Davis
- The General (1926) as A Southern General
- The Terrible People (1928) as Clayton Shelton
- The Poor Millionaire (1930) as Attorney Wallace
- The Mighty Barnum (1934) as Henry Wadsworth Longfellow (uncredited)
- Woman Against Woman (1938) as Justice of the Peace (uncredited)
- Second Fiddle (1939) as Minor Role (uncredited)
- Mr. Smith Goes to Washington (1939) as Paine's Friend (uncredited)
