= Betty of Greystone =

1916 American silent film directed by Allan Dwan

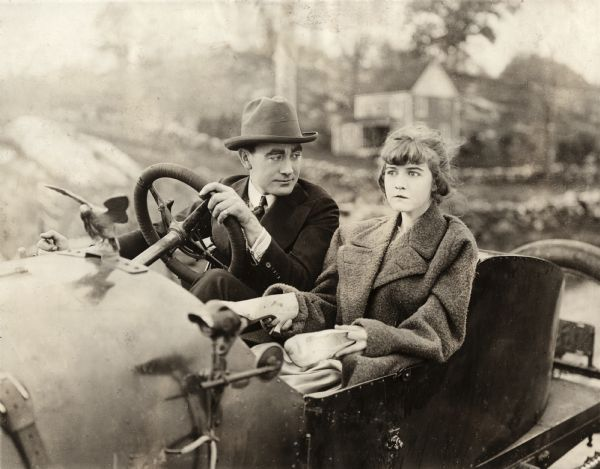
- Film still
- Directed by: Allan Dwan
- Written by: F. M. Pierson; Granville Warwick
- Produced by: Fine Arts
- Starring: Dorothy Gish; Owen Moore
- Cinematography: Victor Fleming
- Distributed by: Triangle Film Corporation
- Release date: February 20, 1916
- Running time: 5 reels
- Country: United States
- Language: Silent (English intertitles)

Betty of Greystone is a 1916 American silent drama film directed by Allan Dwan and produced by the Fine Arts Film Company. It was distributed by Triangle Film Corporation. The film starred Dorothy Gish and Owen Moore. It was partly filmed at Fort Lee, New Jersey. An incomplete print of the film is housed at the EYE Film Institute Netherlands.

== Cast ==
- Dorothy Gish as Betty Lockwood
- Owen Moore as David Chandler
- George Fawcett as Jim Weed
- Norman Selby as Weed's son (credited as Kid McCoy)
- Kate Bruce
- Albert Tavernier
- John Beck
- Warner Richmond
- Grace Rankin
- Macey Harlam (credited as Macey Harlan)
- Eugene Ormonde
- Leonore Harris
