= Phantom Justice =

1924 film

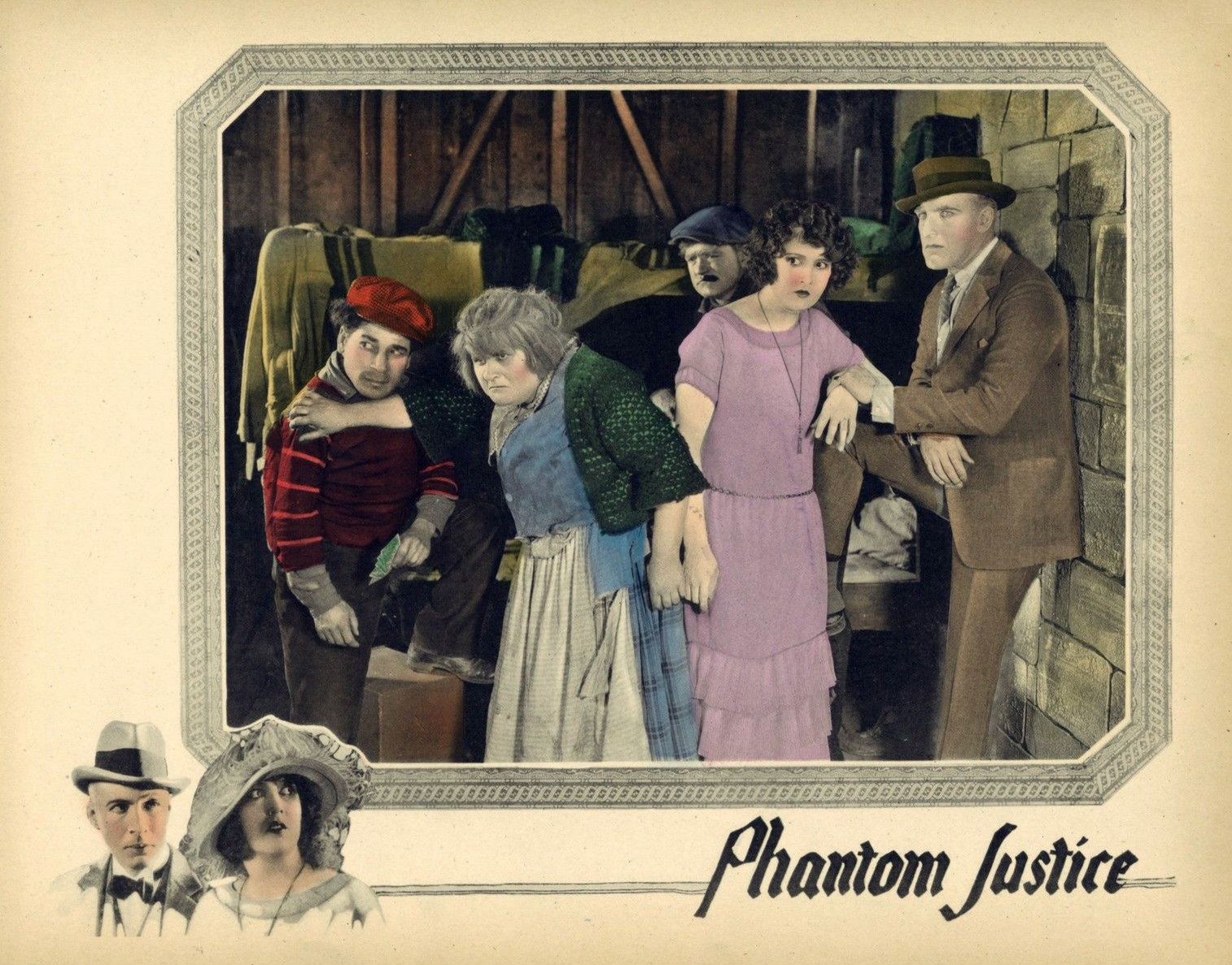
- Lobby card
- Directed by: Richard Thomas
- Screenplay by: Burnett Manley
- Story by: Daniel F. Whitcomb
- Starring: Rod La Rocque; Garry O'Dell; Kathryn McGuire; Frederick Vroom; Lillian Leighton; Frederick Moore
- Cinematography: Jack Fuqua
- Production company: Richard Thomas Productions
- Distributed by: Film Booking Offices of America
- Release date: February 17, 1924
- Running time: 70 minutes
- Country: United States
- Language: Silent (English intertitles)

Phantom Justice is a 1924 American silent crime film directed by Richard Thomas and written by Burnett Manley. The film stars Rod La Rocque, Garry O'Dell, Kathryn McGuire, Frederick Vroom, Lillian Leighton, and Frederick Moore. The film was released on February 17, 1924, by Film Booking Offices of America.

== Plot ==
As described in a film magazine review, Kingsley, a criminal lawyer who often defends those he knows are guilty, visits a dentist. He is summoned thence by a gangster to where Goldie Harper has killed a man. The body is removed under Kingsley's instructions, but unknown to him it is buried in his yard. He defends Goldie successfully, but the body is found. Beatrice Brooks, his sweetheart who objects to his career of defending guilty thugs, is killed by crooks, and the police are about to arrest him. He then wakes up in the dentist's chair, having been in a dream. He resolves to change his business practices.

== Cast ==
- Rod La Rocque as Kingsley
- Garry O'Dell as 'Spike' Lorel
- Kathryn McGuire as Beatrice Brooks
- Frederick Vroom as Dr. Wills
- Lillian Leighton as Mother Meg
- Frederick Moore as 'Gyp' Doyle
- Gordon Dumont as 'Can' Weasel
- Estelle Taylor as 'Goldie' Harper
- Rex Ballard as 'Duke' Ruggles
- Norval MacGregor as Wolfe

== Preservation ==
An incomplete copy of Phantom Justice is held at the BFI National Archive.
