= The Woman Who Walked Alone =

1922 film by George Melford

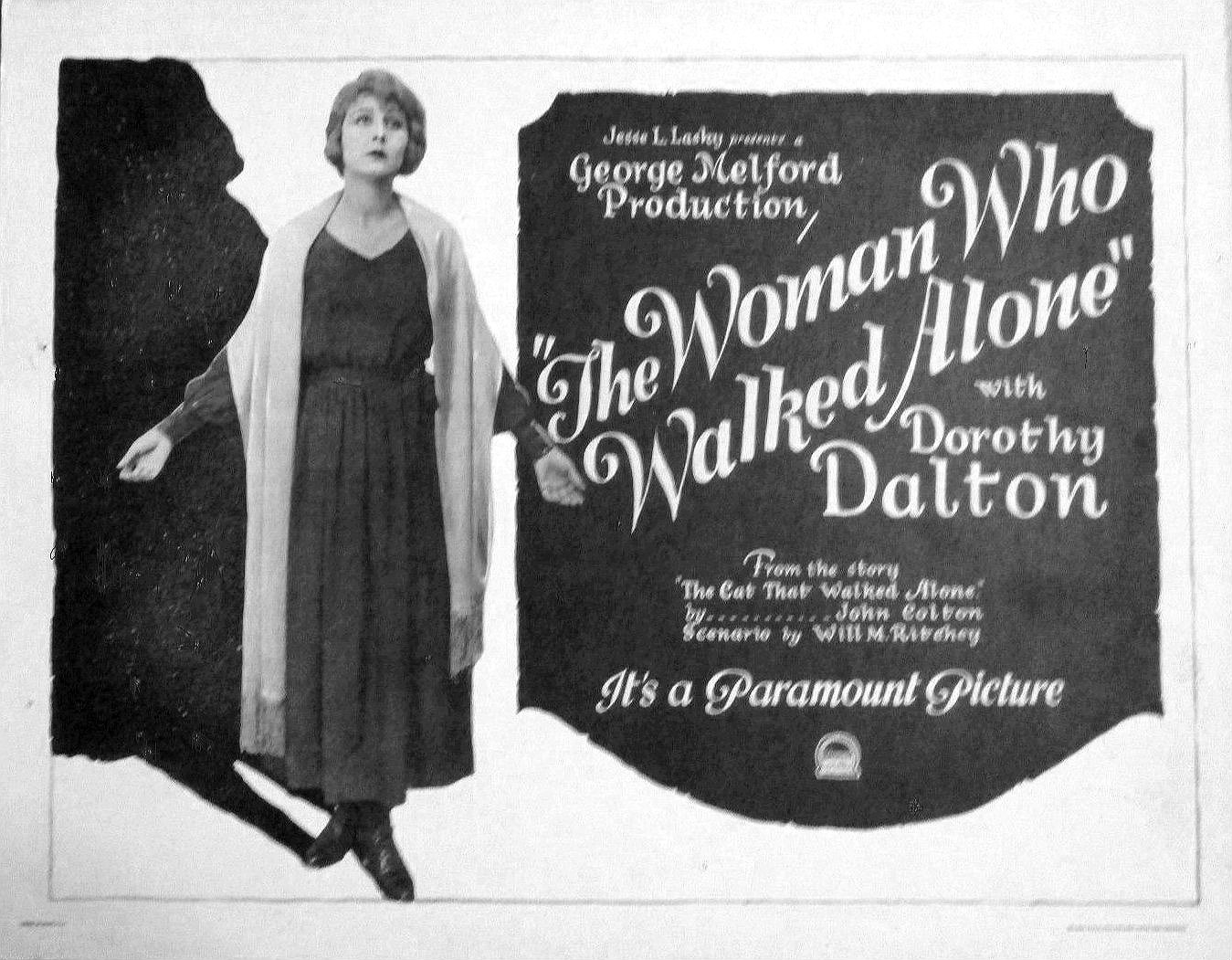
- Lobby card
- Directed by: George Melford
- Screenplay by: Will M. Ritchey
- Based on: "The Cat That Walked Alone" by John Colton
- Produced by: Jesse L. Lasky
- Starring: Dorothy Dalton; Milton Sills; E.J. Ratcliffe; Wanda Hawley; Frederick Vroom; Mayme Kelso; John Davidson
- Cinematography: Bert Glennon
- Production company: Famous Players–Lasky Corporation
- Distributed by: Paramount Pictures
- Release date: June 11, 1922
- Running time: 60 minutes
- Country: United States
- Language: Silent (English intertitles)

The Woman Who Walked Alone is a 1922 American silent drama film directed by George Melford and written by John Colton and Will M. Ritchey. The film stars Dorothy Dalton, Milton Sills, E. J. Ratcliffe, Wanda Hawley, Frederick Vroom, Mayme Kelso, and John Davidson. The film was released on June 11, 1922, by Paramount Pictures.

== Plot ==
As described in a film magazine, Lady Iris Champneys is forced into an unwelcome marriage to the old and cranky but wealthy Earl of Lemister by her penniless parents and almost immediately he divorces her when he discovers her in the room of one of his guests, where she had gone to recover some letters of her sister Muriel. Iris has casually met Clement Gaunt, a former American ace who is now employed as a chauffeur by a neighbor. Clement loses his job and goes to South Africa where he is employed by Schriemann, a Boer farmer. He becomes involved in an unsought and compromising situation with the farmer's wife Hannah. In a fight with Schriemann, the later is shot by his dusky wife. She throws the blame upon Clement, and he hides in the mountains. While replenishing his supplies he spies the exiled Iris, now a proprietress of a hotel where the mounted police congregate. Iris is informed by Mombo, a former servant of Schriemann, that Clement or "Yankee Jim" is a murderer. She sends for Jock MacKeinney, leader of the mounted police, and they arrest Clement. Iris has now discovered that Clement is not a murderer, and agrees, upon a coin toss, to marry him if he is set free or that he would submit to arrest. Iris wins the toss and marries Clement, but Jock is not satisfied and trails the couple when they try to escape. After a long chase scene, Clement is caught, but Iris forces a confession from Schriemann's wife, which brings about the happy ending.

== Cast ==
- Dorothy Dalton as The Honorable Iris Champneys
- Milton Sills as Clement Gaunt
- E. J. Ratcliffe as Earl of Lemister (credited as E.J. Radcliffe)
- Wanda Hawley as Muriel Champneys
- Frederick Vroom as Marquis of Champneys
- Mayme Kelso as Marchioness of Champneys (credited as Maym Kelso)
- John Davidson as Otis Yeardley
- Harris Gordon as Sir Basil Deere
- Charles Stanton Ogle as Schriemann
- Mabel Van Buren as Hannah Schriemann
- Maurice Bennett Flynn as Jock MacKeinney (credited as Maurice 'Lefty' Flynn)
- Cecil Holland as Mombo
- John McKinnon as Lemister's Butler (credited as John MacKinnon)
- Tempe Pigott as Iris’ maid

== Production ==
Dalton wore a blonde wig for the film so that her character Iris would have an appearance similar to her sister Muriel, who was played by Wanda Hawley.

== Preservation ==
A copy of The Woman Who Walked Alone is housed at the Gosfilmofond film archive in Moscow, Russia.
