= The Grim Comedian =

1921 film by Frank Lloyd

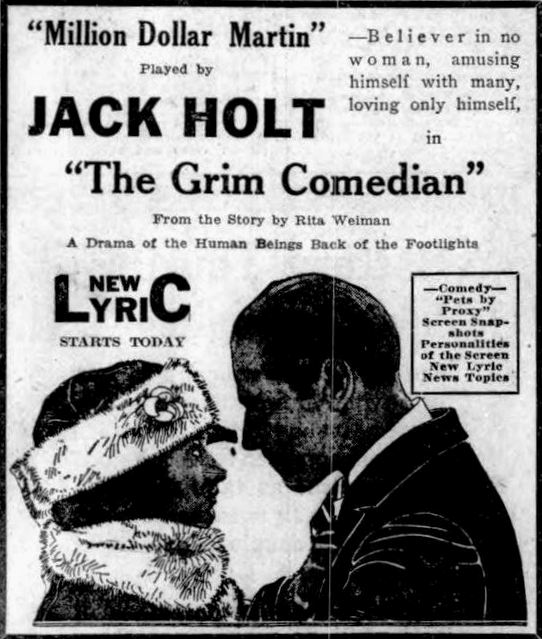
- Newspaper advertisement
- Directed by: Frank Lloyd
- Written by: Bess Meredyth
- Story by: Rita Weiman
- Starring: Phoebe Hunt] Jack Holt; Gloria Hope
- Cinematography: Norbert Brodine
- Production company: Goldwyn Pictures
- Distributed by: Goldwyn Distributing
- Release date: November 13, 1921
- Running time: 60 minutes
- Country: United States
- Language: Silent (English intertitles)

The Grim Comedian is a 1921 American silent drama film directed by Frank Lloyd and starring Phoebe Hunt, Jack Holt, and Gloria Hope.

== Plot ==
As described in a film magazine, an automobile passenger tells an old man a tale, while speeding across the country, of the actress Marie Lamonte who gives up luxury, a beautiful car, and a cozy apartment furnished by Harvey "Million Dollar" Martin. She does all this so that her daughter Dorothy, who was reared in a convent, might not be contaminated by the presence of the roue. However, Harvey meets the young woman and a genuine affection springs up for her. On the day that they are to elope, Marie goes to Harvey's apartment, finds her daughter waiting in an adjoining room, and in desperation shoots Harvey, wounding him in the hand. "I did not think that you would do it," he says. "You've won." He forthright tells Dorothy that he did not intend to marry her. "The grim comedian" known as life has turned the tables on the millionaire when happiness was within his grasp.

== Cast ==
- Phoebe Hunt as Marie Lamonte
- Jack Holt as Harvey Martin
- Gloria Hope as Dorothy
- Bert Woodruff as Old Dad
- Laura La Varnie as Gracie Moore
- May Hopkins as Billie Page
- John Harron as Geoffrey Hutchins
- Joseph J. Dowling as Carleton Hutchins

== Production ==
Exteriors for The Grim Comedian were filmed at Big Bear.

== Bibliography ==
- Munden, Kenneth White. The American Film Institute Catalog of Motion Pictures Produced in the United States, Part 1. University of California Press, 1997.
