= The Decoy (1916 Mutual) =

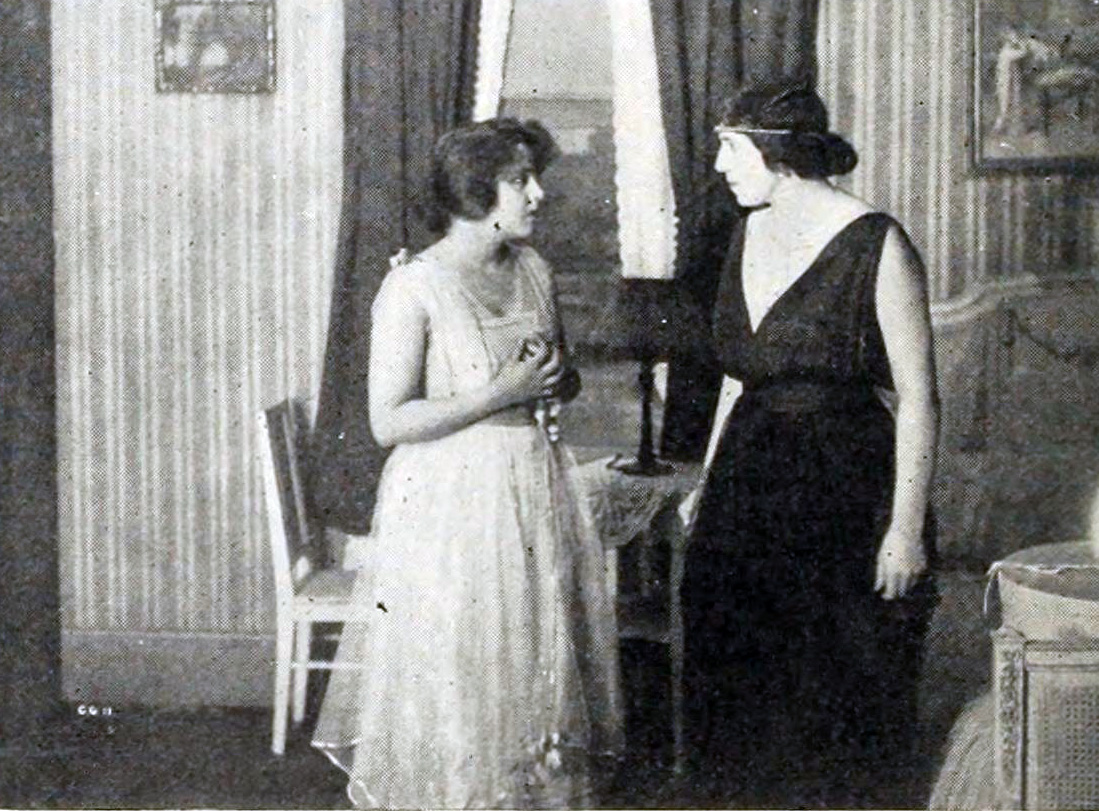
- Frances Nelson and Leonore Harris
- Directed by: George Lederer
- Written by: Herbert Hall Winslow (scenario)
- Based on: short story The Country Girl by Herbert Hall Winslow
- Produced by: Mutual Film Corporation
- Starring: Frances Nelson; Leonore Harris; Gladden James
- Distributed by: Mutual Film Corporation; State Rights(1920 C.B. Price); Signal Films 1922
- Release date: June 29, 1916
- Running time: 5 reels
- Country: USA
- Language: Silent (English intertitles)

The Decoy is a 1916 silent film crime drama directed by George Lederer and distributed by Mutual Film Company.

== Re-releases ==
The film was rereleased in 1920 by C. B. Price under State Rights basis. In 1922 an independent company, Signet Film, rereleased the film under the title The Faithless Sex with Henry J. Napier listed as the director.

== Cast ==
- Frances Nelson - Glory Moore
- Gladden James - Harvey Dix
- Leonore Harris - Mrs. Lawrence
- Robert Frazer - Jim Danvers
- Frank Beamish - Milt Bannon
- Lois Wilson -

== Preservation status ==
- This film survives in the Library of Congress collection and the BFI National Archive.
