= The Witness Chair =

1936 film by George Nicholls, Jr.

- Directed by: George Nicholls, Jr.
- Written by: Rita Weiman
- Screenplay by: Rian James; Gertrude Purcell
- Produced by: Samuel J. Briskin
- Starring: Ann Harding; Walter Abel; Douglass Dumbrille
- Cinematography: Robert De Grasse
- Edited by: William Morgan
- Music by: Roy Webb
- Production company: RKO Radio Pictures
- Distributed by: RKO Radio Pictures
- Release date: April 24, 1936
- Running time: 64 minutes
- Country: United States
- Language: English

The Witness Chair is a 1936 American courtroom drama film directed by George Nicholls, Jr. and starring Ann Harding, Walter Abel and Douglass Dumbrille.

== Plot ==
Late one night, secretary Paula Young leaves the office of her boss, Stanley Whittaker, locking the door and taking the stairs to avoid being seen by the elevator operator. The next morning, the cleaning lady finds Whittaker's dead body, an apparent suicide. Police Lieutenant Poole finds a letter signed by Whittaker in which the deceased states he embezzled $75,000. Soon, however, he suspects otherwise and, after investigating, arrests widower James "Jim" Trent, the vice president of Whittaker Textile Corporation. The gun that fired the fatal shot belongs to Trent, and the typewritten suicide note, though signed by Whittaker, specifically states that Trent is not involved in the embezzlement.

The trial goes badly for the defendant. The elevator operator recalls seeing only Whittaker and Trent in the office building that night, and Martin, the prosecuting attorney, produces a possible strong motive: Trent's daughter Connie intended to run away with Whittaker that night. However, Paula interrupts the proceedings to claim responsibility for the crime. She had guessed that Whittaker intended to flee the country with Connie (she being unaware of his embezzlement) when two ship tickets were delivered to the office. With strong, concealed feelings for Trent, Paula forced Whittaker at gunpoint to sign the confession she had typed. However, Whittaker then tried to grab the gun, only to be fatally shot in the struggle. Trent asks Paula to marry him.

== Cast ==
- Ann Harding as Paula Young
- Walter Abel as James "Jim" Trent
- Douglass Dumbrille as Stanley Whittaker
- Frances Sage as Constance "Connie" Trent
- Moroni Olsen as Police Lieutenant Poole
- Margaret Hamilton as Grace Franklin, the bookkeeper
- Maxine Jennings as Tillie Jones, Trent's secretary
- William 'Billy' Benedict as Benny Ryan, the office boy
- Paul Harvey as Prosecuting Attorney Martin
- Murray Kinnell as Defense Attorney Conrick
- Charles Arnt as Mr. Henshaw, the auditor
- Frank Jenks as Roy Levino, the elevator operator

== Critical reception ==
The New York Times dismissed it as "a lugubrious and mediocre film;" while Picturegoer commented that the film revealed the identity of the murderer in the first three minutes and that "seeing how long it takes for the police and the lawyers" to uncover the truth "is apt to wear thin" but that ultimately the film delivered on both the drama and the comedy. Of Ann Harding, the review stated that her role "varies between just plain unhappiness and downright misery" and that the film "is not the fine Ann Harding vehicle for which we have been waiting."

More recently Noirish called it a "very interesting B-movie," writing that "The Witness Chair is no hidden classic, but it’s a movie far better and certainly far more intriguing than its obscurity might suggest."
