= The Whispered Name =

1924 silent film

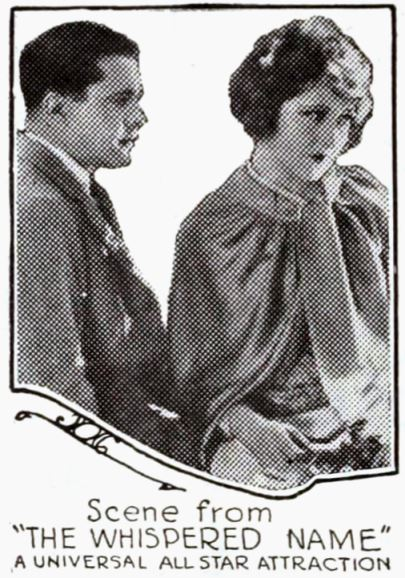
- Newspaper advertisement
- Directed by: King Baggot
- Written by: Lois Zellner
- Based on: The Co-Respondent by Alice Leal Pollock and Rita Weiman
- Starring: Ruth Clifford; Charles Clary; W.E. Lawrence
- Cinematography: Jackson Rose
- Production company: Universal Pictures
- Distributed by: Universal Pictures
- Release date: January 21, 1924
- Running time: 50 minutes
- Country: United States
- Language: Silent (English intertitles)

The Whispered Name is a 1924 American silent drama film directed by King Baggot and starring Ruth Clifford, Charles Clary, and W.E. Lawrence. It was based on a Broadway play that had previously been made into the 1917 film The Co-Respondent.

== Plot ==
As described in a film magazine, Lagdon Van Kreel (Clary), millionaire, is sued by his wife Marcia (Mersch) for divorce at the instigation of her attorney, Craig Stephenson (Merkyl), who has been having sex with her. They put detectives on Lagdon's trail. In the meantime Anne Gray (Clifford), a young country woman, elopes with Robert Gordon (Lawrence), a scapegrace, who seeks to victimize her. They arrive at Van Kreel's hotel, where he discovers Gordon's plans, interferes, and takes charge of the young woman. The detectives, suspecting that this is a clandestine meeting, obtain a flash photograph of the two. Anne, alarmed, flees. She does not learn Lagdon's name, nor does he hers. She obtains a position on the News, an ultraconservative journal edited by John Manning (Welch), the son of its founder. Its assistant managing editor, Fred Galvin (Stevenson), is secretly owner of the Tattle-tale, a gutter-weekly retailing scandal. Galvin is watching the Van Kreel divorce eagerly, scenting blackmail. In the meantime Anne and Manning fall in love with each other. Fred learns that Anne was the young woman seen with Langdon in the hotel and sends her to Marcia Van Kreel's home to interview her, secretly informing the latter who Anne is. Marcia denounces her. Langdon enters and insists that the girl is innocent. Anne telephones Fred Galvin, begging him to clear her, and he taunts her. John, overhearing, administers a thrashing to Fred, who confesses owning the scandal weekly, and admits that it is a blackmail scheme. He admits that he and lawyer Craig Stephenson work up divorce cases, then use the weekly to levy tribute through fear of public scandal. John Manning breaks up the ring and clears the situation up in a dramatic finale.

== Cast ==
- Ruth Clifford as Anne Gray
- Charles Clary as Lagdon Van Kreel
- W.E. Lawrence as Robert Gordon
- Mary Mersch as Marcia Van Kreel
- John Merkyl as Craig Stephenson
- Niles Welch as John Manning
- Hayden Stevenson as Fred Galvin
- Buddy Messinger as The Office Boy
- Herbert Fortier as Judge James Morrell
- Joseph North as Detective Mahoney
- Emily Fitzroy as Amanda Stone
- Jane Starr as Mrs. Billy Shotwell
- Carl Stockdale as Z. Todd

== Preservation ==
With no prints of The Whispered Name located in any film archives, it is a lost film.

== Bibliography ==
- Munden, Kenneth White. The American Film Institute Catalog of Motion Pictures Produced in the United States, Part 1. University of California Press, 1997.
