= Fighting Through (1919 film) =

1919 silent film directed by Christy Cabanne

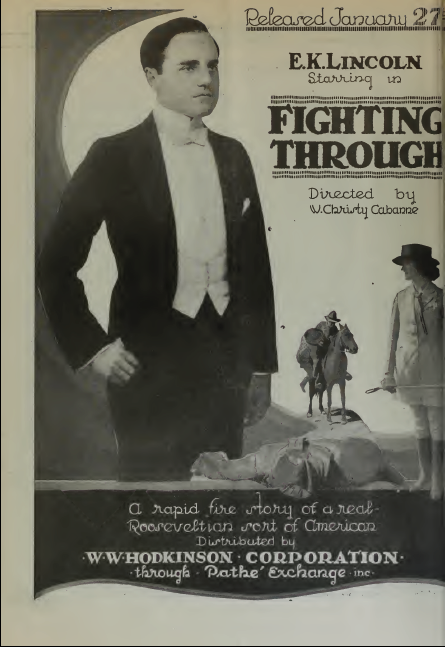
- Directed by: Christy Cabanne
- Written by: Christy Cabanne
- Produced by: Christy Cabanne
- Starring: E. K. Lincoln; Spottiswoode Aitken; Millicent Fisher
- Cinematography: Sam Landers
- Production company: William Christy Cabanne Producing Co.
- Distributed by: Pathé Exchange; W. W. Hodkinson Corporation
- Release date: January 27, 1919 (U.S.)
- Running time: 6 reels
- Country: United States
- Languages: Silent; English intertitles

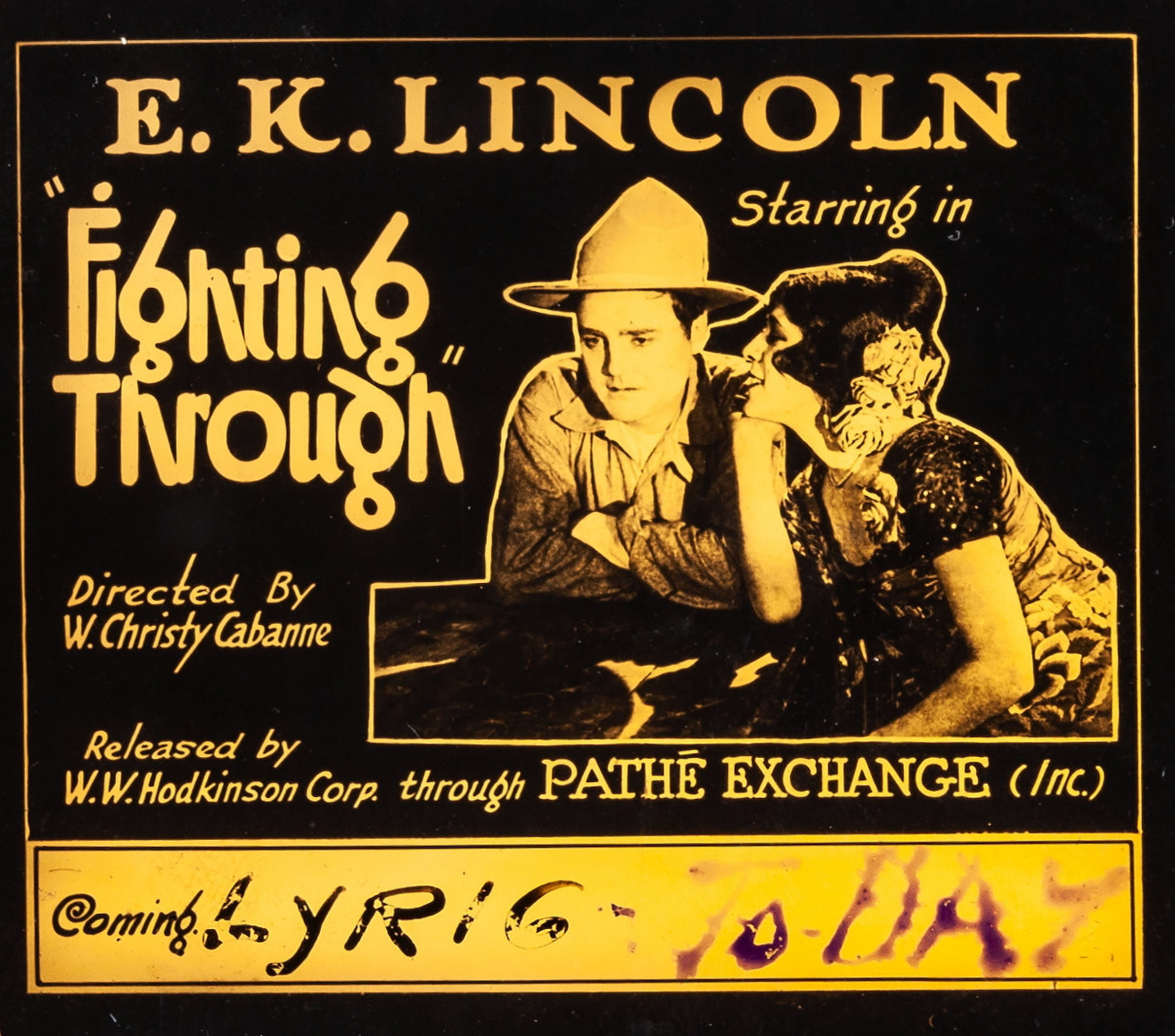
Fighting Through (1919) lantern slide

Fighting Through is a 1919 silent American drama film, directed by Christy Cabanne. It stars E. K. Lincoln, Spottiswoode Aitken, and Millicent Fisher. It was released on January 27, 1919.

== Plot ==
Robert Carr was raised by his grandfather, Dabney Carr, who had been a Colonel in the Confederate Army during the American Civil War. He is taught by his grandfather to distrust the U.S. government. Robert is engaged to Maryland Warren, who is also being pursued by Raymond Haynes. Raymond concocts a scenario which allows him to save Maryland from a runaway horse, while making it seem that Robert was too cowardly to come to her aid. Maryland accuses Robert of being a coward. Later, when the U. S. declares war on Germany, Robert is again falsely accused of cowardice and disloyalty towards the United States. Disgusted, Maryland breaks off their engagement. Despondent, Robert goes for a walk, where he is set upon by a group of hobos who rob him, beat him unconscious, and load him aboard a west-bound train.

Later, Robert is now in Arizona, tramping around with some hobo friends. Maryland arrives on vacation, accompanied by her mother and Raymond, who is still pursuing her. Maryland is kidnapped by a group of Yaqui Indians, and taken across the border to Mexico. In rescuing her, Robert proves both his bravery and his loyalty to the United States.

== Cast list ==
- E. K. Lincoln as Robert Carr
- Spottiswoode Aitken as Colonel Dabney Carr
- Millicent Fisher as Maryland Warren
- Frederick Vroom as Braxton Warren
- Helen Dunbar as Mrs. Warren
- Hayward Mack as Raymond Haynes

== Production ==
The film was originally titled, The American Spirit.

== Reception ==
Motion Picture News gave the film a positive review. They felt the film was "well put together", and paid particular compliments to Cabanne's direction. They enjoyed the plot, and felt the film was well-paced, full of action and suspense. They also highlighted the performances of E. K. Lincoln, Millicent Fisher, Spottiswoode Aitken, Hayward Mack, Frederick Vroom, and Helen Dunbar. Moving Picture World also gave the film a good review, stating, "There is a great deal of outdoor charm and romantic interest in this six-reel feature." They felt that the plot built appropriately, and were impressed with the acting of Lincoln, Fisher and Aitken.
