= The Idle Rich (1921 film) =

1921 film directed by Maxwell Karger

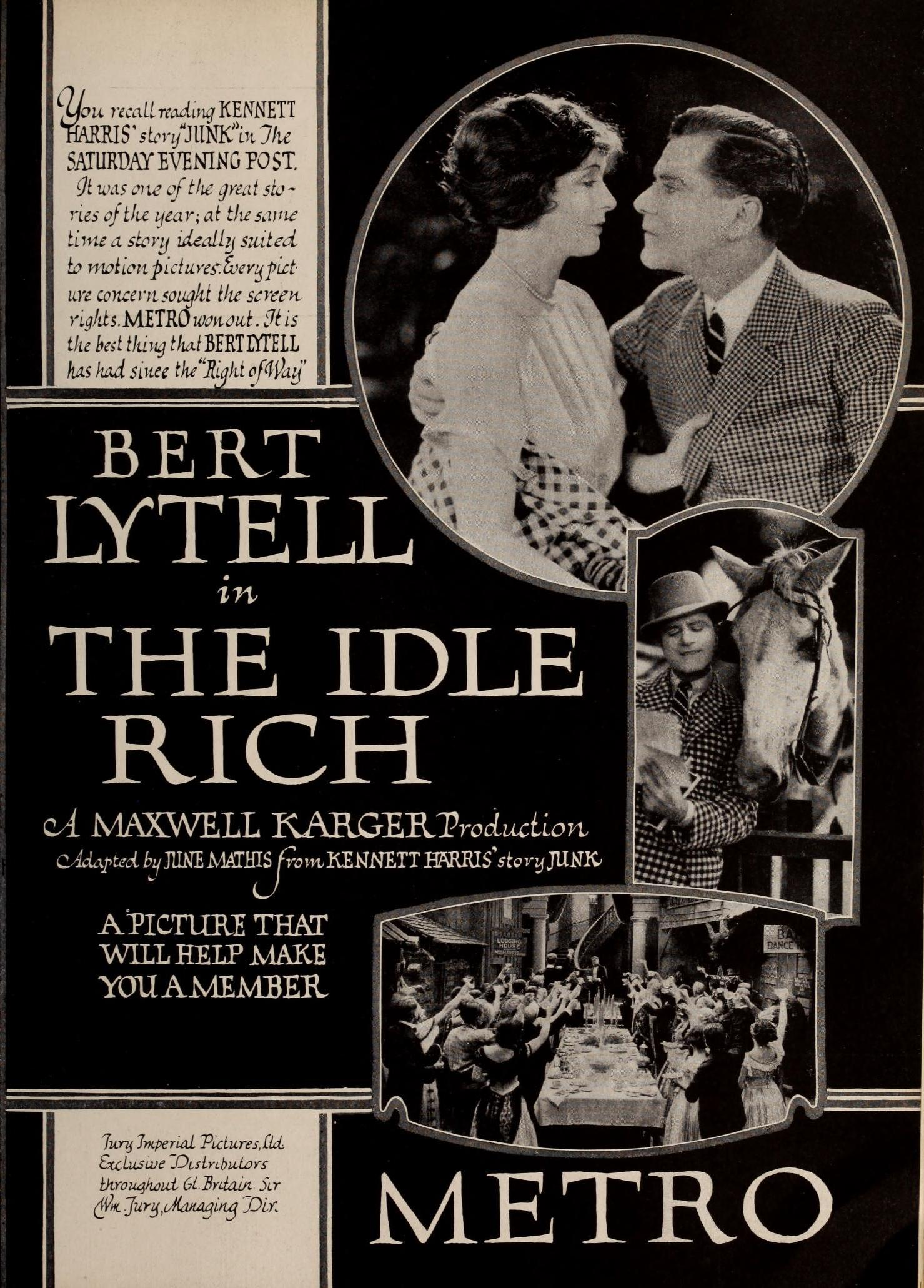
- Advertisement for the film
- Directed by: Maxwell Karger
- Written by: June Mathis
- Based on: Short story "Junk" published in the Saturday Evening Post by Kenneth Harris
- Starring: Bert Lytell; Virginia Valli; John Davidson
- Cinematography: Arthur Martinelli
- Production company: Metro Pictures Corporation
- Distributed by: Metro Pictures Corporation
- Release date: December 26, 1921 (US)
- Running time: 5 reels
- Country: United States
- Language: Silent (English intertitles)

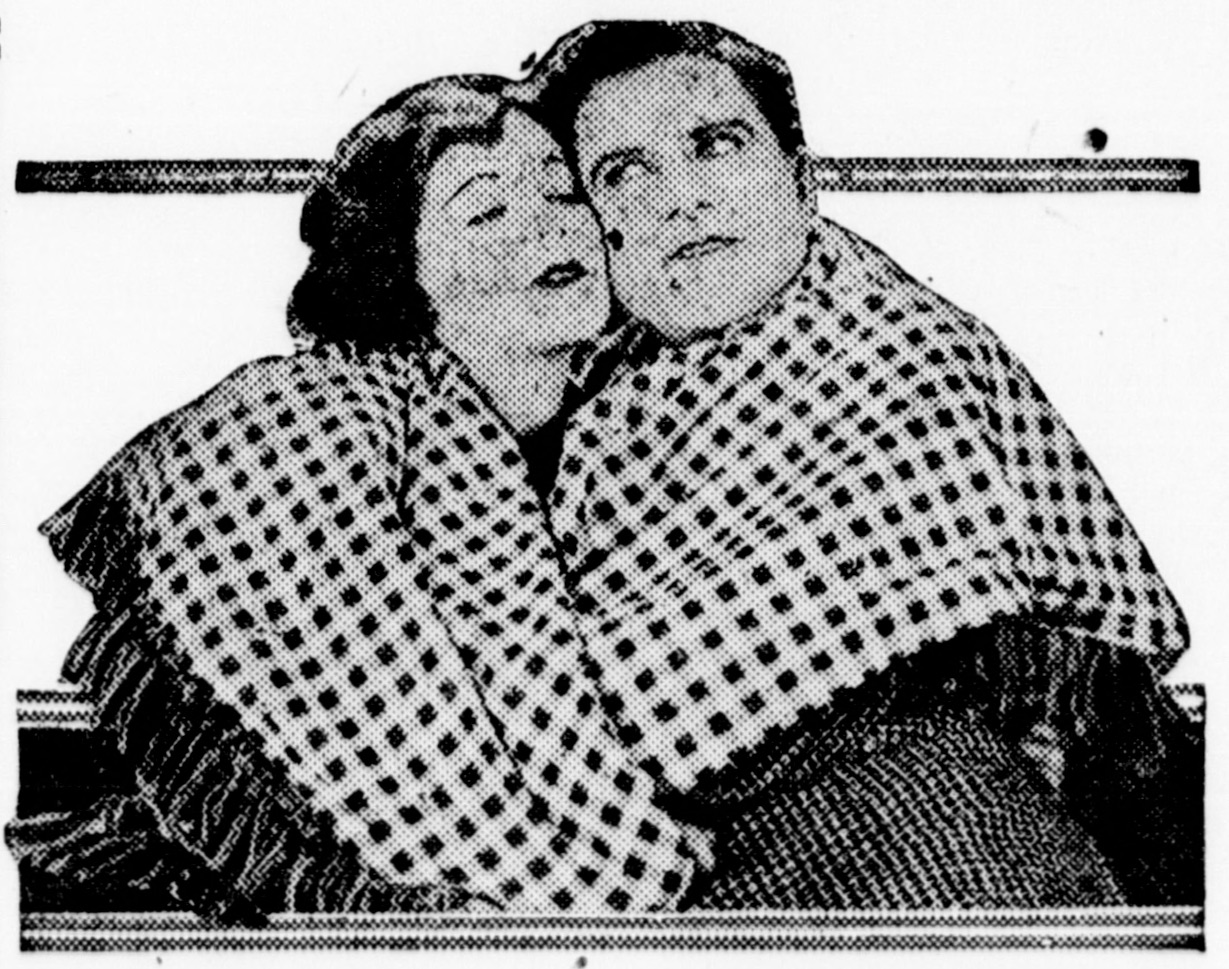
Scene published in a contemporary newspaper

The Idle Rich is a 1921 American silent comedy film directed by Maxwell Karger. The film stars Bert Lytell, Virginia Valli, and John Davidson. It was released on December 26, 1921, by Metro Pictures. It is not known whether this film survives.

== Plot ==
As described in a film magazine, Samuel Weatherbee, a wealthy young man, is told by his sweetheart Mattie Walling that his money is a liability instead of an asset. She favors Dillingham Coolidge, a poorer but industrious young man.

However, when Sam's fortune is swept away by the suicide of his executor, he is cut off by his society friends and leaves San Francisco for a small property in San Diego that was left to him by an aunt. He finds the place filled with old and useless things, but conceives the idea of transferring them into cash by advertising a barter and exchange emporium. Soon he needs larger quarters and leases a valuable property in town from a former friend. Then, after his business grows and they want to get him out of the neighborhood, he makes them pay dearly for ending his lease. Eventually he wins back his sweetheart Mattie and his place in society.

== Cast ==
- Bert Lytell as Samuel Weatherbee
- Virginia Valli as Mattie Walling
- John Davidson as Dillingham Coolidge
- Joseph Harrington as Judge O'Reilly
- Thomas Jefferson as Uncle Coolidge
- Victory Bateman as Mrs. O'Reilly
- Leigh Wyant as Jane Coolidge
- Max Davidson as the Tailor
