= Rita Weiman =

American screenwriter (1885–1954)

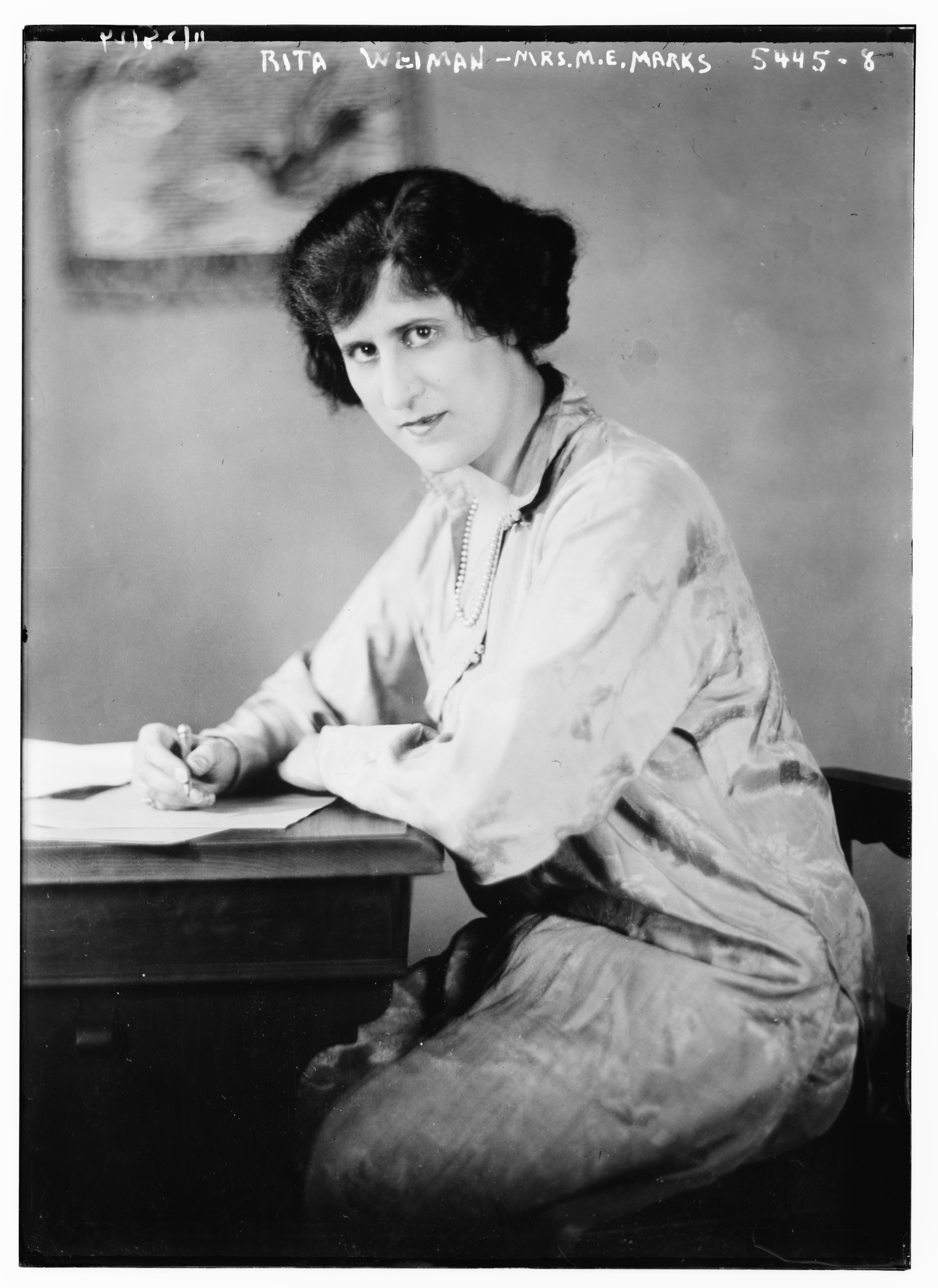
- Born: February 23, 1885; Philadelphia, Pennsylvania, USA
- Died: June 23, 1954 (aged 69); Hollywood, California, USA
- Occupations: Playwright, screenwriter, author, journalist

Rita Weiman (1885–1954) was a playwright, journalist, author, and screenwriter.

== Biography ==
=== Beginnings ===
Rita was born in Philadelphia in 1885 and raised in a Quaker community. She later recounted that she felt lucky her parents supported her ambitions to become a writer. She attended the Friends' Central School before moving to New York to pursue journalism but soon fell into playwriting.

=== Writing career ===
She later worked at The New York Herald with Alice Leal Pollack, who she'd soon write a well-regarded play, The Co-respondent, with. The next year, it was turned into a film by Ralph Ince for Universal. A number of her stories and stage plays were turned into screenplays, including 1920's Curtain, which first ran in The Saturday Evening Post.

She met director William C. deMille in the early 1920s, and he asked her to write a love story between an older man and a younger woman. She quickly obliged, wrote the story, sold it to a magazine, and then helped turn it into the script for deMille's 1921 film After the Show. With The Grim Comedian, she spent time in California and worked closely with Samuel Goldwyn and director Frank Lloyd to oversee translating her work from script to screen.

She'd continue straddling the film and stage worlds through the 1930s, and afterward would continue writing magazine articles, short stories, and plays until her death in 1954.

=== Personal life ===
In 1924, weeks after writing a lengthy article about why she remained single, she married advertising man Maurice Marks, who she met years earlier when she first moved to New York.

== Selected filmography ==
- The Co-Respondent (1917)
- Madame Peacock (1920) Based on Weimar's novel Footlights
- Curtain (1920)
- Footlights (1921)
- After the Show (1921)
- The Grim Comedian (1921)
- Rouged Lips (1923)
- The Whispered Name (1924)
- The Spotlight (1927)
- On Your Back (1930)
- Esclavas de la Moda (1931)
- The Witness Chair (1936)
- The President's Mystery (1936)

== Selected theatrical works ==
- The Acquittal
- The Co-respondent
- Look Upon the Prisoner
- The Smart Step
- The Watch Dog
