= My Neighbor's Wife (1925 film) =

1925 film

- Directed by: Clarence Geldart
- Based on: short story The Other Man's Wife by James Oliver Curwood
- Produced by: Clifford S. Elfelt; J. Charles Davis
- Starring: E. K. Lincoln; Helen Ferguson; Herbert Rawlinson
- Cinematography: Joseph Walker
- Production companies: Clifford S. Elfelt Productions; J. Charles Davis Productions
- Distributed by: Davis Distributing Division
- Release date: May 21, 1925
- Running time: 6 reels
- Country: United States
- Languages: Silent; English titles

My Neighbor's Wife is a surviving 1925 American silent comedy film directed by Clarence Geldart and starring E. K. Lincoln, Helen Ferguson and Herbert Rawlinson. It was released on a State's Rights by Davis Distributing Division.

== Cast ==
- E. K. Lincoln as Jack Newberry
- Helen Ferguson as Florence Keaton
- Edwards Davis as Mr. Keaton
- Herbert Rawlinson as Allen Allwright
- William Russell as Eric von Greed, film director
- William Bailey as Greed's assistant
- Chester Conklin as Cameraman
- Tom Santschi as Inventor
- Mildred Harris as Inventor's Wife
- Douglas Gerrard as Bertie
- Margaret Loomis as Kathlyn Jordan
- Ralph Faulkner as William Jordan
- Philippe De Lacy as William Jordan Jr.

== Preservation status ==
- The film is preserved at Cinematheque Quebecoise, Montreal.
