= John Davidson (actor, born 1886) =

American actor (1886–1968)

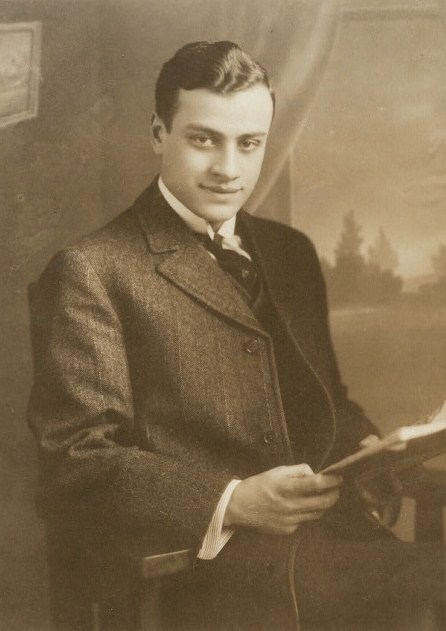
- Davidson, c. 1920
- Born: December 25, 1886; New York City, US
- Died: January 16, 1968 (aged 81); Los Angeles, California, US
- Occupation: Actor
- Years active: 1915-1963

John Davidson (December 25, 1886 – January 16, 1968) was an American stage and film actor. He appeared in more than 140 films from 1915 to 1963. He was born in New York City, and he died in Los Angeles, California.

== Selected filmography ==
- The Wonderful Adventure (1915) - M. Cheivasse
- The Green Cloak (1915) - Paul Duncan
- The Sentimental Lady (1915) - Norman Van Aulsten
- The Danger Signal (1915) - Rodman Cadbury
- Man and His Soul (1916) - Stephen Might Jr.
- The Red Mouse (1916)
- The Pawn of Fate (1916) - André Lesar
- The Wall Between (1916) - Capt. Burkett
- A Million A Minute (1916) - Duke de Reves
- Romeo and Juliet (1916) - Paris
- The Brand of Cowardice (1916) - Navarete
- The Power of Decision (1917) - Wood Harding
- The Beautiful Lie (1917) - Howard Hayes
- Souls Adrift (1917) - Maberly Todd
- The Wild Girl (1917) - Minor Role
- The Awakening (1917) - Horace Chapron
- Shame (1917) - Cabaret Dancer
- The Spurs of Sybil (1918) - Paul Berwick
- The Winning of Beatrice (1918) - John Maddox Jr.
- The Grouch (1918) - Narciso
- The Bluffer (1919) - Edmond Curtiss
- The Stronger Vow (1919) - José de Cordova
- Through the Toils (1919) - Walter Tressler
- Forest Rivals (1919) - Pierre Dubois
- The Black Circle (1919) - Jim Garvin
- The Genius Pierre (1919)
- Romance (1920) - Beppo
- A Woman's Business (1920)
- The Tiger's Cub (1920) - Lone Wolf
- The Great Lover (1920) - Sonino
- Cheated Love (1921) - Mischa Grossman
- The Bronze Bell (1921) - Salig Singh
- No Woman Knows (1921) - Theodore Brandeis
- Fool's Paradise (1921) - Prince Talaat-Ni
- The Idle Rich (1921) - Dillingham Coolidge
- Saturday Night (1922) - The Count Demitry Scardoff
- The Woman Who Walked Alone (1922) - Otis Yeardley
- Under Two Flags (1922) - Sheik Ben Ali Hammed
- His Children's Children (1923) - Florian
- Monsieur Beaucaire (1924) - Richelieu
- Ramshackle House (1924) - Ernest Riever
- The Rescue (1929) - Hassim
- Kid Gloves (1929) - Stone
- Queen of the Night Clubs (1929) - Don Holland
- Honky Tonk (1929) - Trailer Host (uncredited)
- The Time, the Place and the Girl (1929) - Pete Ward
- Skin Deep (1929) - Blackie Culver
- The Thirteenth Chair (1929) - Edward Wales
- The Life of the Party (1930) - Mr. Smith
- Docks of San Francisco (1932) - Vance
- Arsène Lupin (1932) - Gourney-Martin's Butler
- Grand Hotel (1932) - Hotel Manager (uncredited)
- Jewel Robbery (1932) - Robbery Accomplice (uncredited)
- Blondie of the Follies (1932) - Party Guest (uncredited)
- Six Hours to Live (1932) - Kellner
- Behind Jury Doors (1932) - George Fisher
- Broadway Bad (1933) - The Prince (uncredited)
- Oliver Twist (1933) - (uncredited)
- Gabriel Over the White House (1933) - Delegate to the Debt Conference (uncredited)
- Reunion in Vienna (1933) - Police Officer (uncredited)
- The Devil's in Love (1933) - Kasim - Native (uncredited)
- Dinner at Eight (1933) - Mr. Hatfield
- Ladies Must Love (1933) - One of Bill's Friends (uncredited)
- The Mad Game (1933) - Doctor
- The Perils of Pauline (1933) - Dr. Bashan
- Bombay Mail (1934) - R. Xavier
- Hold That Girl (1934) - Ackroyd
- Viva Villa! (1934) - Gen. Lopez (uncredited)
- Stand Up and Cheer! (1934) - Blue Nose Hour Radio Announcer (voice, uncredited)
- The Scarlet Empress (1934) - Marquis de la Chetardie (uncredited)
- Murder in Trinidad (1934) - Gookol Moah
- Burn 'Em Up Barnes (1934, Serial) - Tom Chase - Race Car Henchman [Chs. 1-2, 5] (uncredited)
- Hollywood Mystery (1934) - Siegfried Sonoff
- The Moonstone (1934) - Yandoo
- Tailspin Tommy (1934, Serial) - Wade 'Tiger' Taggart
- A Shot in the Dark (1935) - Prof. Brand
- Behind the Green Lights (1935) - Beasley
- The Call of the Savage (1935, Serial) - Prince Samu [Chs. 11-12]
- Reckless (1935) - Sid - Mona's Lawyer (uncredited)
- Charlie Chan in Egypt (1935) - Chemist Daoud Atrash
- Death from a Distance (1935) - Ahmad Haidru
- The Last Days of Pompeii (1935) - Phoebus - Runaway Slave
- A Tale of Two Cities (1935) - Morveau
- Mummy's Boys (1936) - Cafe Manager in Cairo (uncredited)
- Confession (1937) - Actor (uncredited)
- Jungle Menace (1937, Serial) - Dr. Coleman
- Live, Love and Learn (1937) - Mr. Wingate (uncredited)
- The Fighting Devil Dogs (1938, Serial) - Lin Wing [Ch. 1]
- Storm Over Bengal (1938) - Aide to Ramin Khan (uncredited)
- Sharpshooters (1938) - Stableman (uncredited)
- Arrest Bulldog Drummond (1938) - Gumba - Bird Seller (uncredited)
- Mr. Moto's Last Warning (1939) - Hakin
- Duel Personalities (1939, Short) - Prof. William Delmore (hypnotist) (uncredited)
- Mr. Moto Takes a Vacation (1939) - Prince Suleid
- Miracles for Sale (1939) - Weird Voice (voice, uncredited)
- Saps at Sea (1940) - (uncredited)
- Turnabout (1940) - Nightclub Patron (uncredited)
- King of the Royal Mounted (1940, Serial) - Shelton [Chs 4, 5]
- The Great Dictator (1940) - Hospital Superintendent (uncredited)
- The Devil Bat (1940) - Prof. Raines
- Adventures of Captain Marvel (1941, Serial) - Tal Chotali
- Singapore Woman (1941) - (uncredited)
- Dick Tracy vs Crime Inc (1941) - Lucifer
- Perils of Nyoka (1942, Serial) - Lhoba - Tuareg High Priest [Chs.4-7,12-13]
- Secret Service in Darkest Africa (1943, Serial) - Sheik [Ch. 2] (uncredited)
- Captain America (1944, Serial) - Gruber
- Bermuda Mystery (1944) - Superintendent (uncredited)
- The Chinese Cat (1944) - Carl Karzdas / Kurt Karzdas
- Call of the Jungle (1944) - Harley
- Wilson Princeton Team Doctor (uncredited)
- Circumstantial Evidence (1945) - Lawyer (uncredited)
- Where Do We Go from Here? (1945) - Gen. Benedict Arnold (uncredited)
- Captain Eddie (1945) - Reporter (uncredited)
- Easy to Look At (1945) - Drunk (uncredited)
- The Purple Monster Strikes (1945, Serial) - Emperor of Mars [Chs. 2, 10-11]
- Shock (1946) - Mr. Edwards (uncredited)
- Smooth as Silk (1946) - Sam (uncredited)
- Sentimental Journey (1946) - Floorwalker (uncredited)
- The Razor's Edge (1946) - Banker (uncredited)
- Suddenly It's Spring (1947) - Elevator Passenger (uncredited)
- Daisy Kenyon (1947) - Mervyn, O'Mara's Butler (uncredited)
- The Iron Curtain (1948) - Secretary to the Minister of Justice (uncredited)
- One Touch of Venus (1948) - Customer (uncredited)
- The Luck of the Irish (1948) - Reporter (uncredited)
- Bungalow 13 (1948) - Mr. Eden
- That Wonderful Urge (1948) - Whitson's Butler (uncredited)
- A Letter to Three Wives (1949) - John (uncredited)
- You're My Everything (1949) - Headwaiter (uncredited)
- Slattery's Hurricane (1949) - Maitre D' (uncredited)
- Oh, You Beautiful Doll (1949) - Davis - Steiner's Secretary (uncredited)
- Dancing in the Dark (1949) - Board Member (uncredited)
- The Sword of Monte Cristo (1951) - Artist
- Katie Did It (1951) - Minor Role (uncredited)
- Half Angel (1951) - Best Man (uncredited)
- People Will Talk (1951) - Faculty Board Member (uncredited)
- Golden Girl (1951) - Croupier (uncredited)
- The Cimarron Kid (1952) - Minor Role (uncredited)
- Untamed Frontier (1952) - Townsman (uncredited)
- Thunder in the East (1953) - Hotel Clerk (uncredited)
- Prince Valiant (1954) - Patriarch (uncredited)
- Around the World in 80 Days (1956) - Extra (uncredited)
- Stranger in My Arms (1959) - Minor Role (uncredited)
- A Gathering of Eagles (1963) - Hadley - S.A.C. Observer (uncredited)
