= Love's Crucible =

1916 film directed by Emile Chautard

Love's Crucible is a 1916 American film directed by Emile Chautard based on the play The Point of View by Jules Eckert Goodman. The film stars Frances Nelson.
