= The Almighty Dollar (1916 film) =

1916 film by Robert Thornby

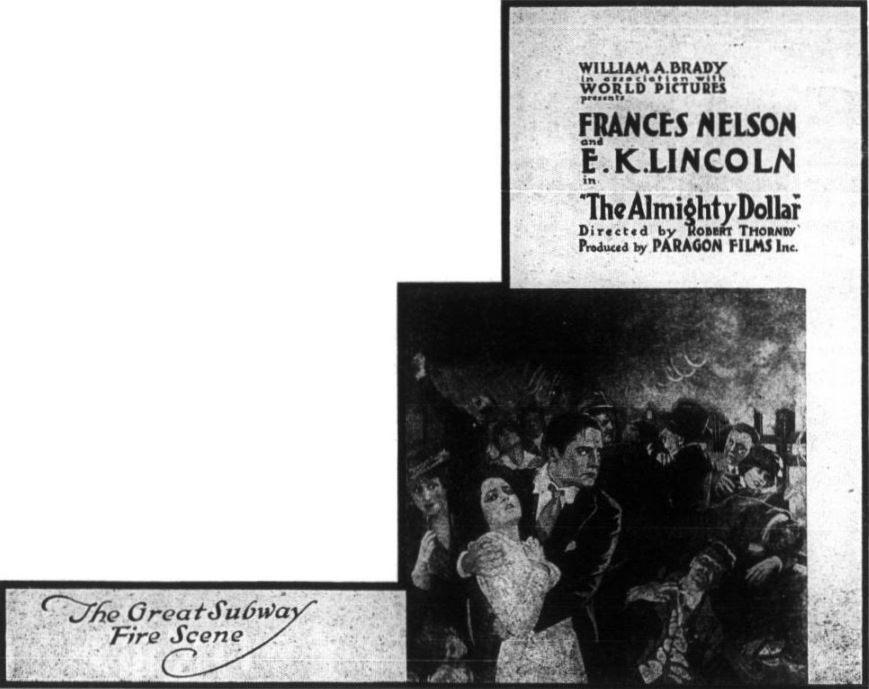
- Advertisement
- Directed by: Robert Thornby
- Written by: Eugene Magnus Ingleton
- Produced by: William A. Brady
- Starring: June Elvidge
- Cinematography: Lucien Andriot
- Production company: Paragon Films
- Distributed by: World Film Corporation
- Release date: September 4, 1916
- Running time: 5 reels
- Country: United States
- Language: Silent (English intertitles)

The Almighty Dollar is a lost 1916 American silent drama film directed by Robert Thornby, to story by E. Magnus Ingleton, and starring June Elvidge, E. K. Lincoln, Frances Nelson, and George Anderson.

== Cast ==
- June Elvidge as Nan Lorimer
- Frances Nelson as Masie Lorimer
- George Anderson as Dr. Thornton
- E. K. Lincoln as John Harwood
- Miss Humphries
- Deborah Nanson
- Jack Meredith

== Preservation ==
With no holdings located in archives, The Almighty Dollar is considered a lost film.
