= The Beloved Traitor =

1918 film

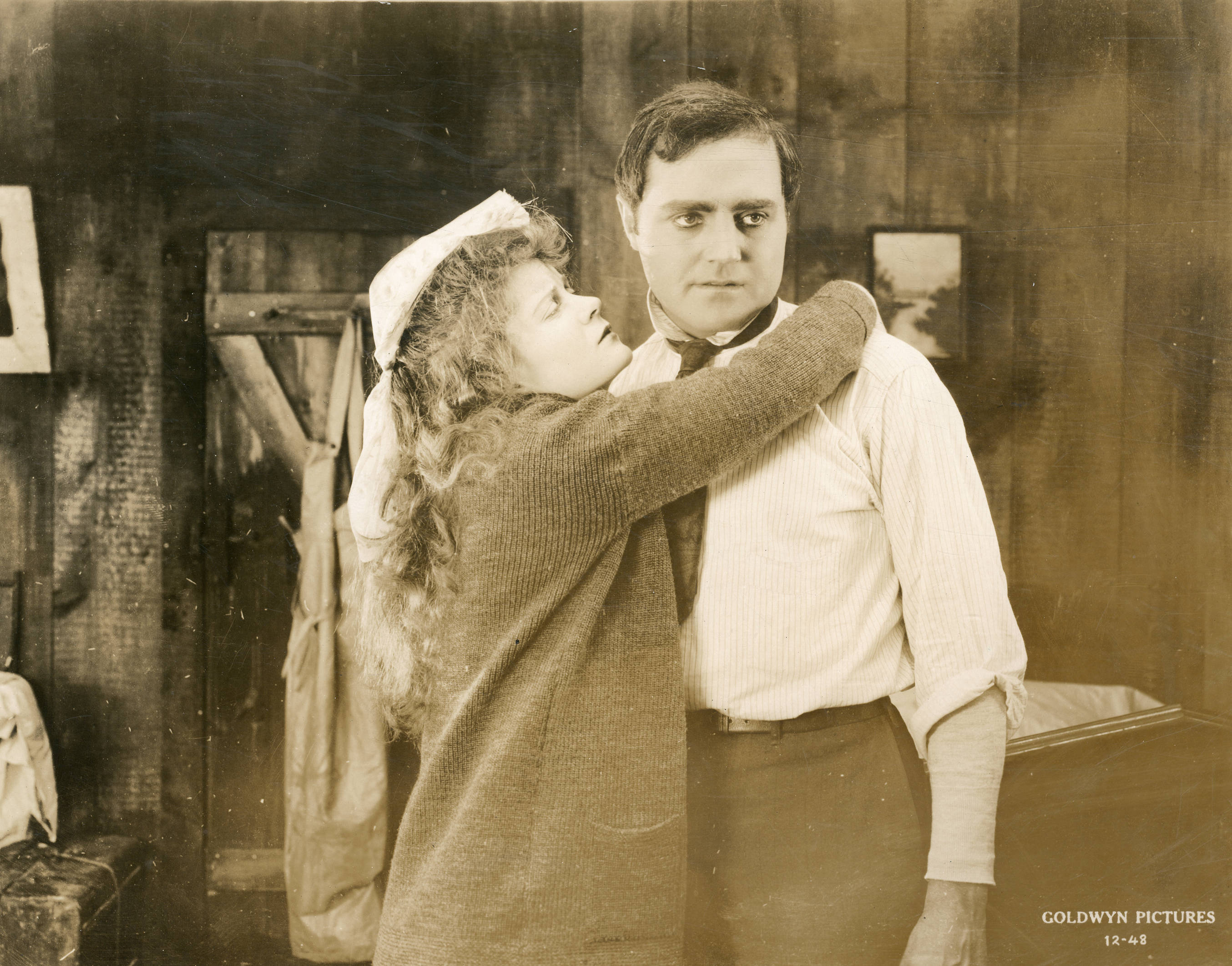
- A scene from The Beloved Traitor with Mae Marsh and E. K. Lincoln (page 14 of the March 2, 1918 Exhibitors Herald.
- Directed by: William Worthington
- Written by: Kenneth Macgowan; Frank L. Packard (novel); George Loane Tucker
- Produced by: Samuel Goldwyn
- Starring: Mae Marsh; E. K. Lincoln; Hedda Hopper
- Cinematography: George W. Hill
- Edited by: George Loane Tucker
- Production company: Goldwyn Pictures
- Distributed by: Goldwyn Distributing
- Release date: February 24, 1918
- Running time: 50 minutes
- Country: United States
- Languages: Silent; English intertitles

The Beloved Traitor is a 1918 American silent drama film directed by William Worthington and starring Mae Marsh, E. K. Lincoln and Hedda Hopper. The film's sets were designed by the art director Hugo Ballin.

== Cast ==
- Mae Marsh as Mary Garland
- E. K. Lincoln as Judd Minot
- Hedda Hopper as Myrna Bliss
- George Fawcett as Henry Bliss
- Bradley Barker as Paul Drayton
- James A. Furey as Father Anthony
- Louis R. Grisel as Simeon Garland
- Chester Morris as Dan

== Bibliography ==
- Robert B. Connelly. The Silents: Silent Feature Films, 1910-36, Volume 40, Issue 2. December Press, 1998.
