= The Man of Courage =

1922 film

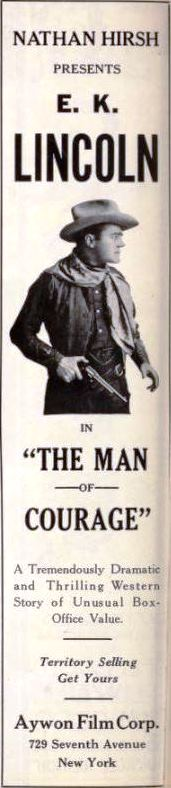
- Advertisement for the film in the Exhibitors Herald newspaper.
- Directed by: E.K. Lincoln
- Produced by: Nathan Hirsh
- Starring: E.K. Lincoln; Spottiswoode Aitken; Frederick Vroom
- Distributed by: Aywon Film Corporation
- Release date: April 21, 1922
- Country: United States
- Languages: Silent; English intertitles

The Man of Courage is a 1922 American silent Western film directed by E.K. Lincoln and starring Lincoln, Spottiswoode Aitken and Frederick Vroom.

== Cast ==
- E.K. Lincoln as William Gregory
- Spottiswoode Aitken as Stephen Gregory
- Frederick Vroom as Morgan Deane
- Millicent Fisher as Dorothy Deane
- Helen Dunbar as Mrs Deane
- John Eberts as Johnny Rivers
- James Young Deer as Aquila
- George Gebhardt as El Cholo

== Bibliography ==
- Laura I. Serna. "We're Going Yankee": American Movies, Mexican Nationalism, and Transnational Cinema, 1917-1935. Harvard University, 2006.
