= Friday the 13th (1916 film) =

1916 film by Emile Chautard

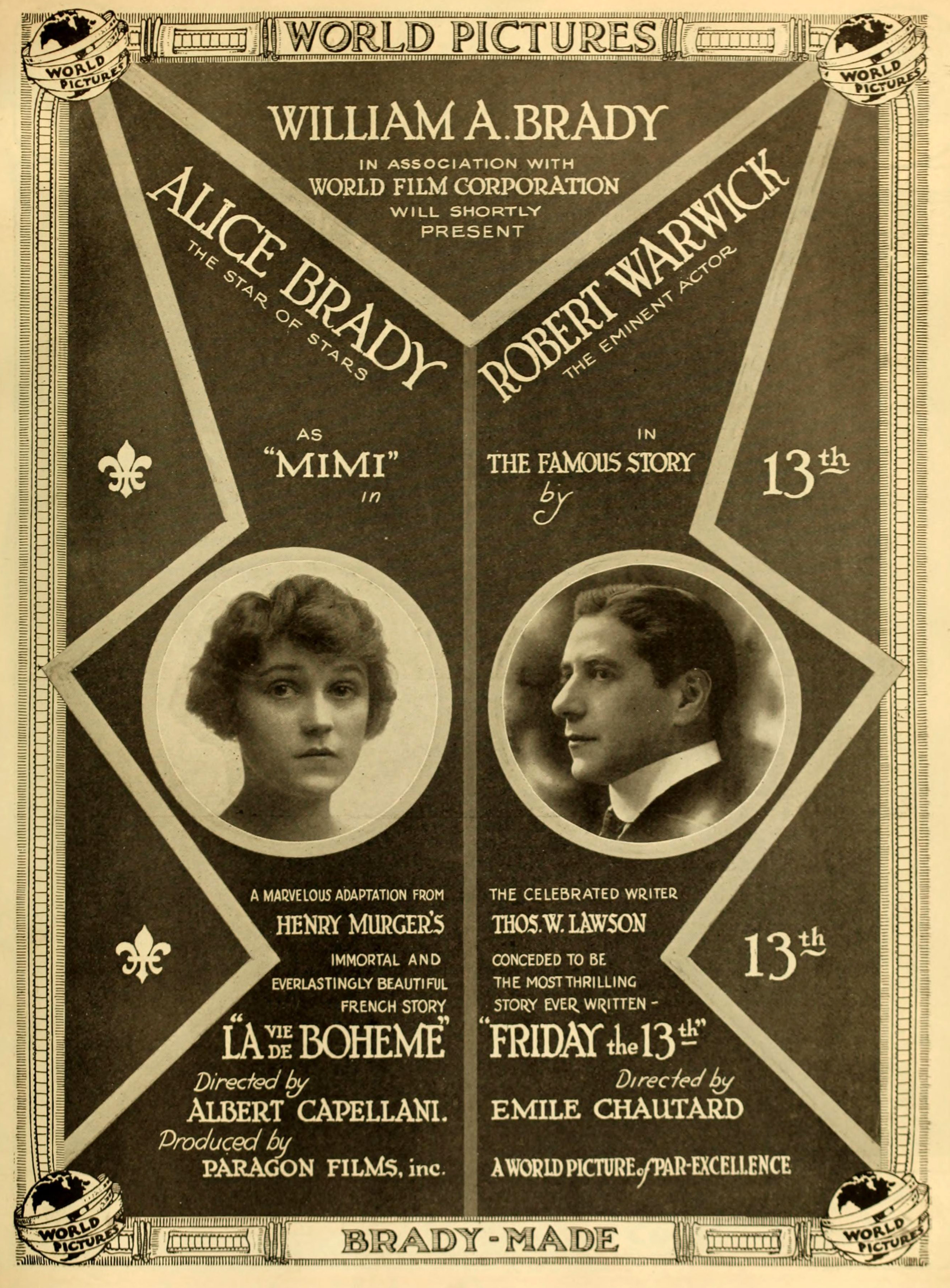
- Joint advertisement with La Bohème
- Directed by: Emile Chautard
- Written by: Frances Marion
- Based on: Friday the Thirteenth (1907) by Thomas William Lawson
- Produced by: World Film Corporation; William A. Brady
- Starring: Robert Warwick
- Cinematography: Lucien Tainguy (it)
- Distributed by: World Film Company
- Release date: September 18, 1916
- Running time: 5 reels
- Country: U.S.
- Language: Silent (English intertitles)

Friday the 13th, also known as Friday the Thirteenth, is a lost 1916 silent drama film directed by Émile Chautard and starring Robert Warwick. It was produced and distributed by World Film Corporation. It was based on the 1907 novel Friday the Thirteenth by Thomas W. Lawson.

== Cast ==
- Robert Warwick as Robert Brownley
- Clarence Harvey as Peter Brownley
- Charles Brandt as Judge Lee Sands
- Gerda Holmes as Beulah Sands
- Montagu Love as Count Varneloff
- Leonore Harris as Simone
