= Leonore Harris =

American actress

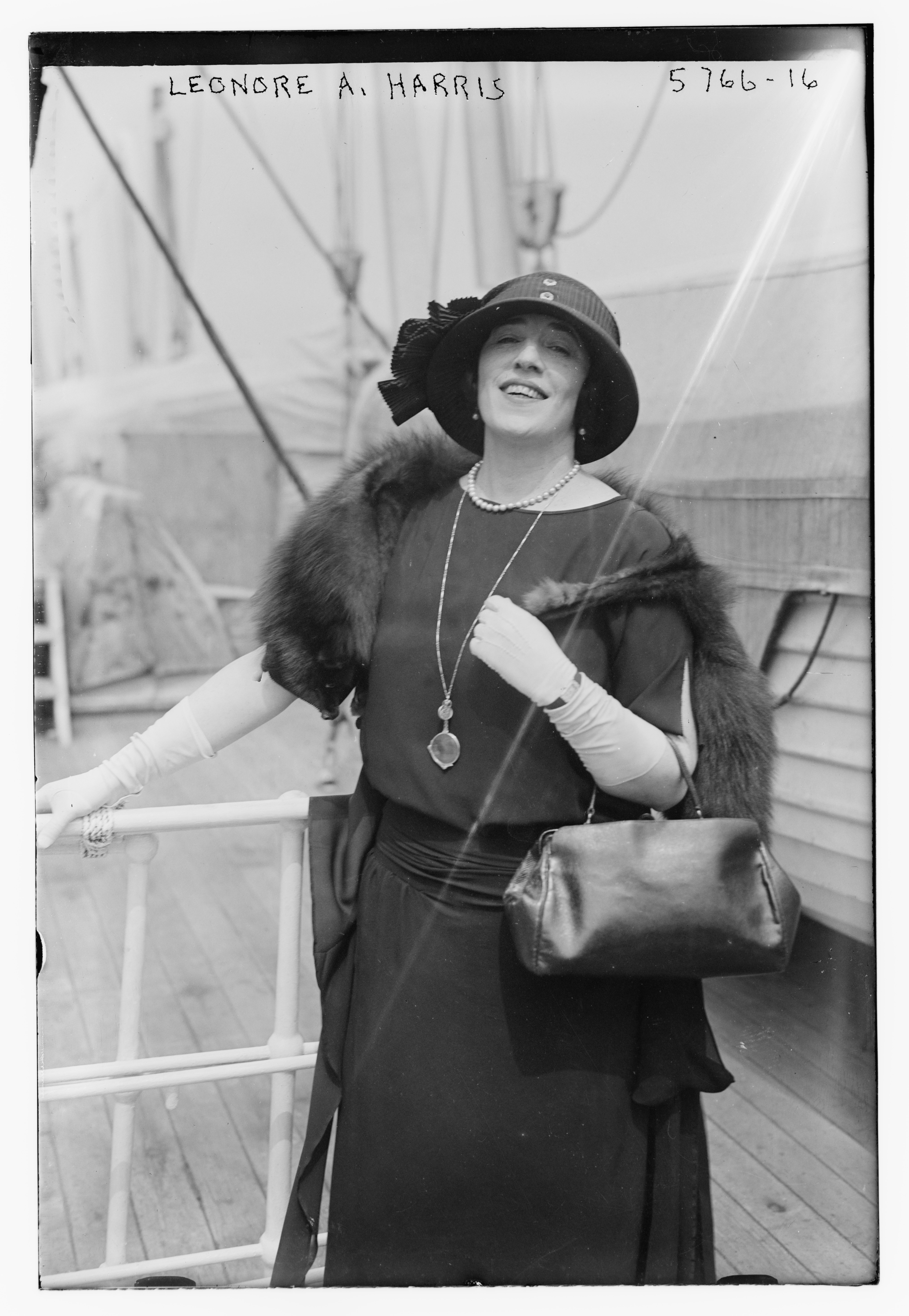
- Leonore Harris aboard an ocean-liner
- Born: July 28, 1879
- Died: September 27, 1953 (aged 74)
- Occupation: Actress
- Years active: 1900-1947

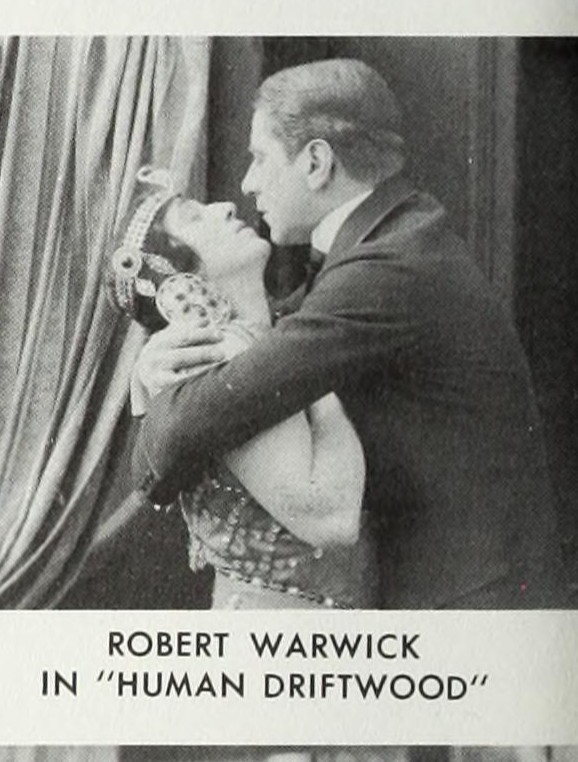
scene with Leonore Harris and Robert Warwick in Human Driftwood

Leonore Harris (July 28, 1879 – September 27, 1953) was an American stage and screen actress. She appeared in a handful of silent films and preferred the Broadway stage. As a young woman she was one of many young actresses appearing on cigarette packages by Philip Morris.

== Filmography ==
- Betty of Greystone (1916)
- Human Driftwood (1916)
- The Decoy (1916) (copy: Library of Congress-LoC, BFI Natl. Film & TV)
- Friday the 13th (1916)
- The Iron Heart (1917)
- To-Day (1917)
- The Faithless Sex (1922)(*a rerelease of 1916 film The Decoy)
