= Curtain (film) =

1920 film

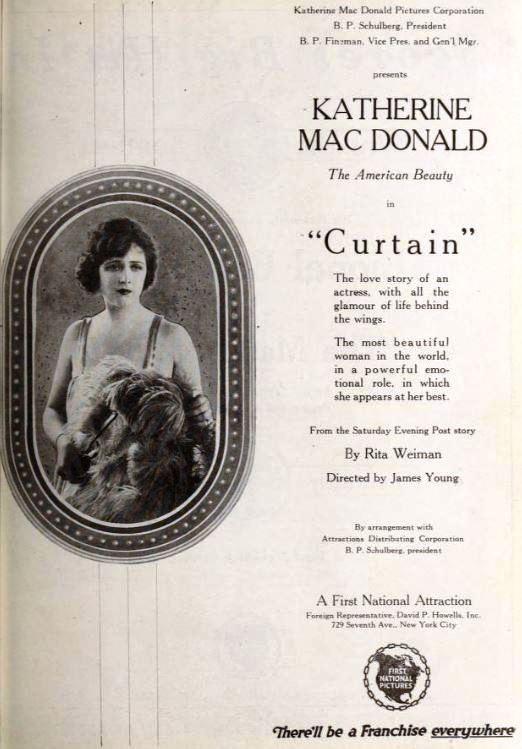
- Directed by: James Young
- Written by: Rita Weiman; James Young
- Produced by: Katherine MacDonald
- Starring: Katherine MacDonald; Edwin B. Tilton; Earl Whitlock
- Cinematography: Joseph Brotherton
- Production company: Katherine MacDonald Pictures
- Distributed by: First National Pictures
- Release date: October 1920
- Country: United States
- Languages: Silent; English intertitles

Curtain is a lost 1920 American silent drama film directed by James Young and starring Katherine MacDonald, Edwin B. Tilton and Earl Whitlock.

== Cast ==
- Katherine MacDonald as Nancy Bradshaw
- Edwin B. Tilton as Jerry Coghlan
- Earl Whitlock as Ted Dorn
- Charles Richman as Dick Cunningham
- Florence Deshon as Lila Grant

== Bibliography ==
- Goble, Alan. The Complete Index to Literary Sources in Film. Walter de Gruyter, 1999.
