= The Power of Decision =

- Directed by: John W. Noble
- Written by: June Mathis
- Starring: Frances Nelson; Richard Tucker; John Davidson
- Cinematography: Herbert Oswald Carleton
- Production company: Rolfe Photoplays
- Distributed by: Metro Pictures
- Release date: April 9, 1917
- Running time: 50 minutes
- Country: United States
- Languages: Silent; English intertitles

The Power of Decision is a 1917 American silent drama film directed by John W. Noble and starring Frances Nelson, Richard Tucker and John Davidson.

== Cast ==
- Frances Nelson as Margot
- Richard Tucker as Austin Bland
- John Davidson as Wood Harding
- Sally Crute as Mrs. Wood Harding
- Mary Asquith as Mrs. Hall
- Fuller Mellish as The Old Artist
- Hugh Jeffrey as The Butler

== Bibliography ==
- Lowe, Denise. An Encyclopedic Dictionary of Women in Early American Films: 1895-1930. Routledge, 2014.
