= Santa Fe Marshal =

1940 American film

- Theatrical release poster
- Directed by: Lesley Selander
- Screenplay by: Harrison Jacobs
- Produced by: Harry Sherman
- Starring: William Boyd; Russell Hayden; Marjorie Rambeau; Bernadene Hayes; Earle Hodgins; Britt Wood; Kenneth Harlan
- Cinematography: Russell Harlan
- Edited by: Sherman A. Rose
- Music by: Gerard Carbonara; John Leipold
- Production company: Harry Sherman Productions
- Distributed by: Paramount Pictures
- Release date: January 26, 1940
- Running time: 68 minutes
- Country: United States
- Language: English

Santa Fe Marshal is a 1940 American Western film directed by Lesley Selander, written by Harrison Jacobs, and starring William Boyd, Russell Hayden, Marjorie Rambeau, Bernadene Hayes, Earle Hodgins, Britt Wood and Kenneth Harlan. It was released on January 26, 1940, by Paramount Pictures.

== Cast ==
- William Boyd as Hopalong Cassidy
- Russell Hayden as Lucky Jenkins
- Marjorie Rambeau as Ma Burton
- Bernadene Hayes as Paula Tate
- Earle Hodgins as Doc Rufus Tate
- Britt Wood as Axel
- Kenneth Harlan as Blake
- William Pagan as Flint
- George Anderson as Tex Barnes
- Jack Rockwell as John Gardner
- Eddie Dean as Town Marshal
