= Human Driftwood =

1916 film

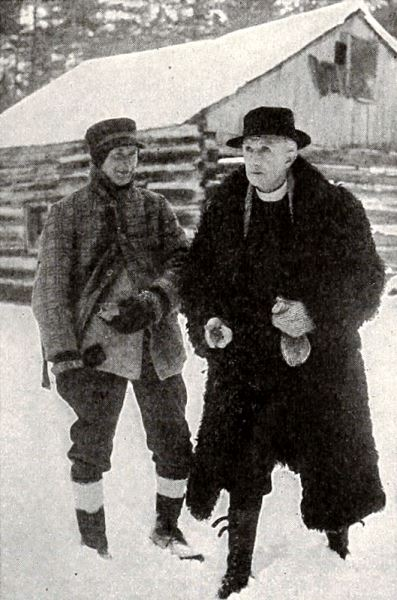
- Still with Alec B. Francis (right)
- Directed by: Émile Chautard
- Written by: Emmett C. Hall (as Emmett Campbell Hall)
- Produced by: Shubert Film Corporation
- Starring: Robert Warwick
- Distributed by: World Film Company
- Release date: April 10, 1916
- Running time: 5 reels
- Country: United States
- Language: Silent (English intertitles)

Human Driftwood is a 1916 American silent drama film directed by Émile Chautard and starring Robert Warwick. It was produced by the Shubert Organization and released through World Film Company.

== Cast ==
- Robert Warwick as Robert Hendricks
- Frances Nelson as Velma
- Leonore Harris as Myra
- Alec B. Francis as Father Harrigan
- Al Hart as Lief Bergson

== Preservation ==
With no prints of Human Driftwood located in any film archives, it is a lost film.
