= The Co-Respondent =

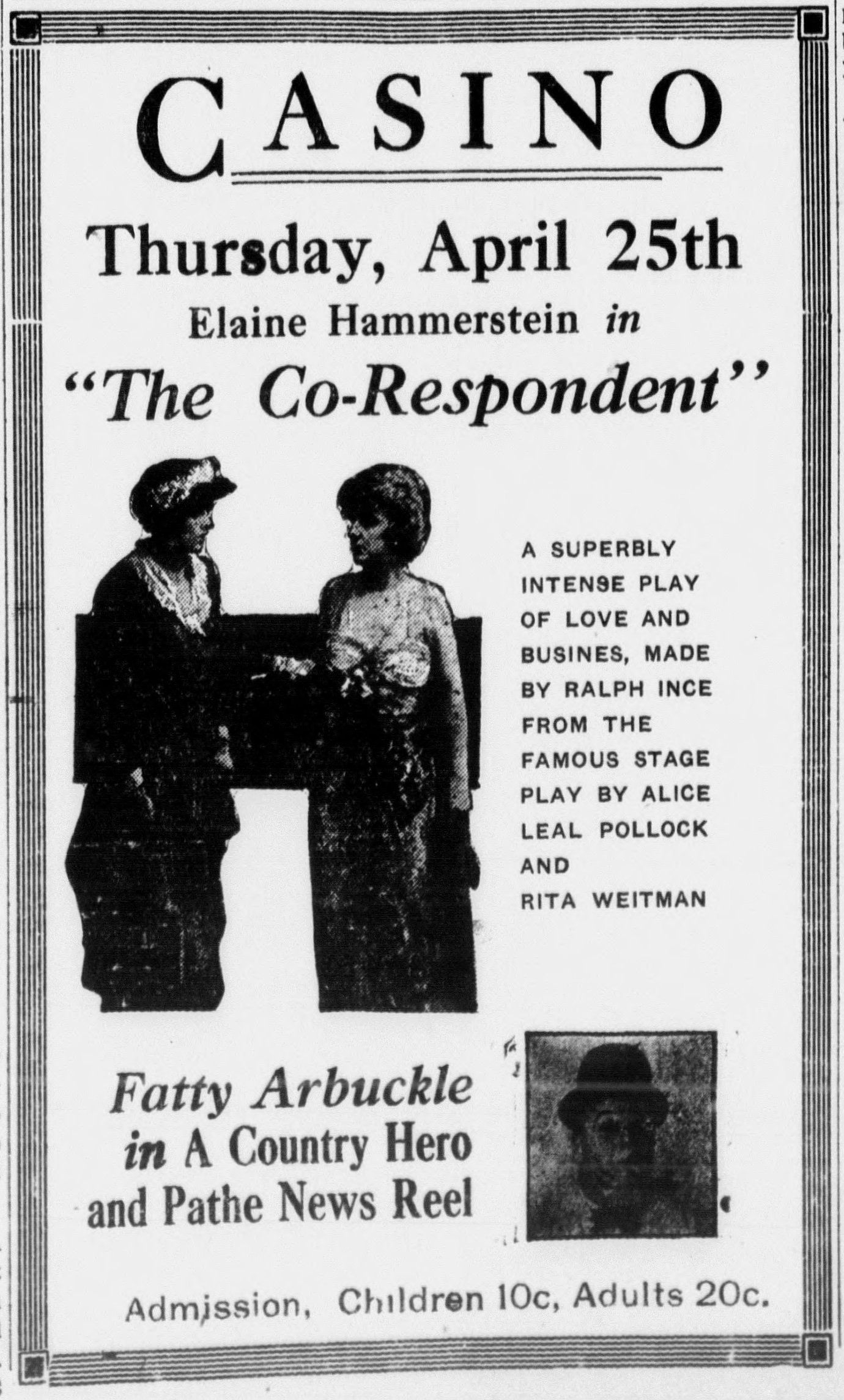
- Contemporary advertisement
- Directed by: Ralph Ince
- Based on: The Co-Respondent by Alice Leal Pollock and Rita Weiman
- Starring: Elaine Hammerstein; Wilfred Lucas; George Anderson
- Production company: Universal Pictures
- Distributed by: Universal Pictures
- Release date: October 14, 1917
- Running time: 50 minutes
- Country: United States
- Languages: Silent; English intertitles

The Co-Respondent is a 1917 American silent drama film directed by Ralph Ince and starring Elaine Hammerstein, Wilfred Lucas and George Anderson. It was based on a Broadway play, and was adapted again by Universal Pictures as The Whispered Name in 1924.

== Cast ==
- Elaine Hammerstein as Ann Gray
- Wilfred Lucas as Richard Manning
- George Anderson as Howard Van Keel
- Winifred Harris as Friend of Mrs. van kreel
- Richard Neill as Attorney for Mrs. van Keel
- Charles Smith as Bellhop
- Josephine Morse as Aunt
- Hattie Horne as Gossip
- Robert Cain as Gossip
- Edna Hunter as Gossip

== Bibliography ==
- Robert B. Connelly. The Silents: Silent Feature Films, 1910-36, Volume 40, Issue 2. December Press, 1998.
