= After the Show (film) =

1921 film by William C. deMille

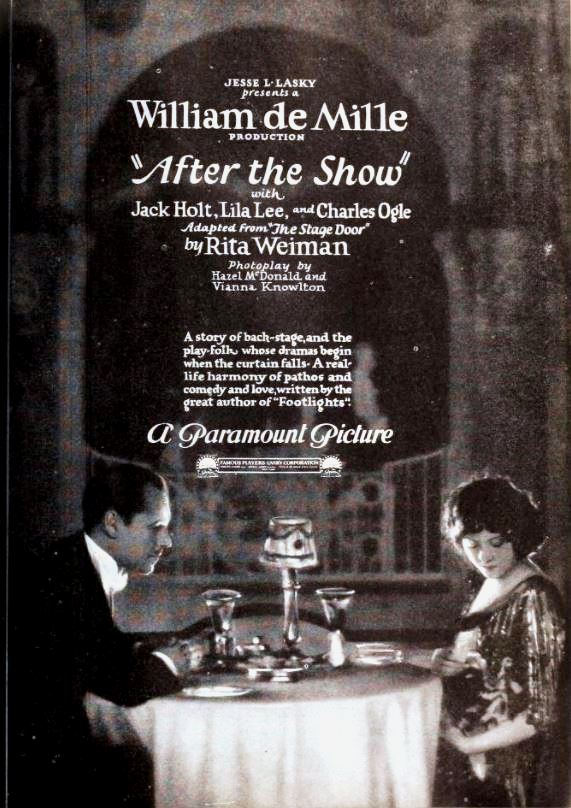
- Advertisement in Exhibitors Herald
- Directed by: William C. deMille
- Screenplay by: Vianna Knowlton; Hazel Christie MacDonald
- Based on: "The Stage Door" by Rita Weiman
- Produced by: Jesse L. Lasky
- Starring: Jack Holt; Lila Lee; Charles Stanton Ogle; Eve Southern; Shannon Day; Carlton S. King
- Cinematography: L. Guy Wilky
- Production company: Famous Players–Lasky Corporation
- Distributed by: Paramount Pictures
- Release date: October 9, 1921
- Running time: 70 minutes
- Country: United States
- Language: Silent (English intertitles)

After the Show is a lost 1921 American silent drama film directed by William C. deMille and written by Vianna Knowlton and Hazel Christie MacDonald based on a story by Rita Weiman. The film stars Jack Holt, Lila Lee, Charles Stanton Ogle, Eve Southern, Shannon Day, and Carlton S. King. The film was released on October 9, 1921, by Paramount Pictures.

== Plot ==
As described in a film magazine, country girl Eileen comes to New York City to make her career on the stage. She is rescued from want by Pop O'Malley, an aged actor who works as a door keeper, and finds employment in the chorus. Larry Taylor, a wealthy man-about-town, seeks to win her without benefit of clergy. She falls in love with him and, against Pop's instructions, goes to his house. Knowing what awaits her there, Pop follows her with a resulting dramatic ending.

== Cast ==
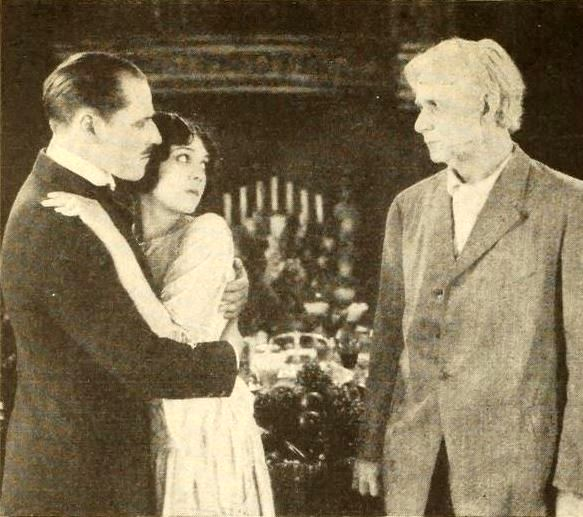
Still with Jack Holt, Lila Lee, and Charles Ogle

- Jack Holt as Larry Taylor
- Lila Lee as Eileen
- Charles Stanton Ogle as Pop O'Malley
- Eve Southern as Naomi Stokes
- Shannon Day as Lucy
- Carlton S. King as Mr. McGuire
- Stella Seager as Vera
- Ethel Wales as Landlady
- William Boyd (uncredited)

== Preservation ==
With no holdings located in archives, After the Show is considered a lost film.
