= One of Many (film) =

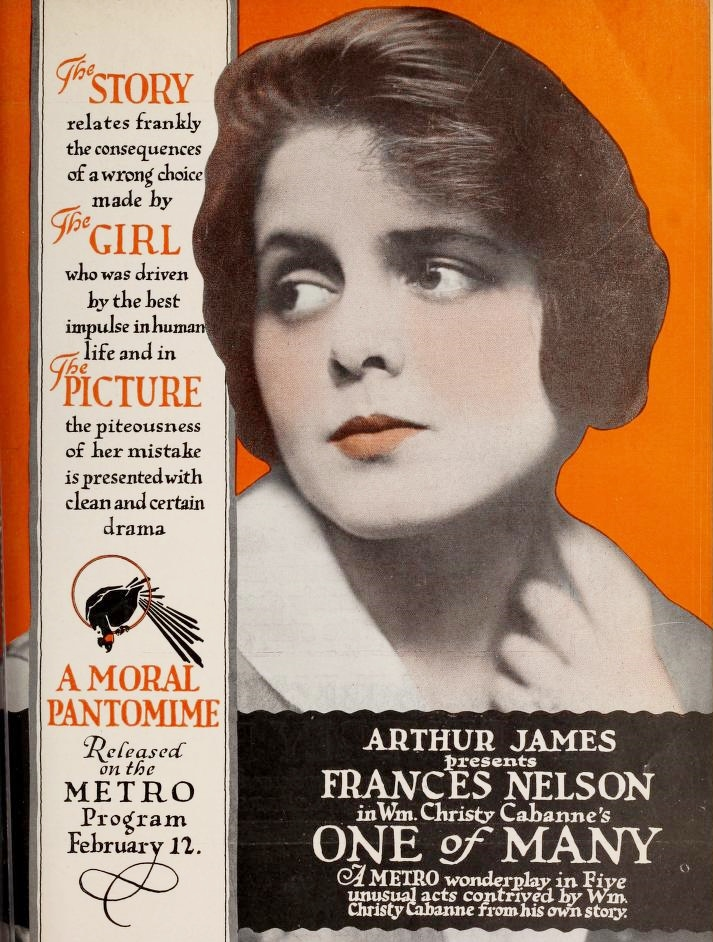
- Directed by: Christy Cabanne
- Written by: Christy Cabanne
- Produced by: Arthur James
- Starring: Frances Nelson; Niles Welch; Mary Mersch
- Cinematography: William Fildew
- Production company: Columbia Pictures Corporation
- Distributed by: Metro Pictures
- Release date: February 12, 1917 (US)
- Running time: 5 reels
- Country: USA
- Language: Silent..English titles

One of Many is a 1917 American film written and directed by Christy Cabanne, starring Frances Nelson with Niles Welch, Mary Mersch, Caroline Harris and Harold Entwistle.
