= E. K. Lincoln =

American actor in the silent film era

E.K. Lincoln
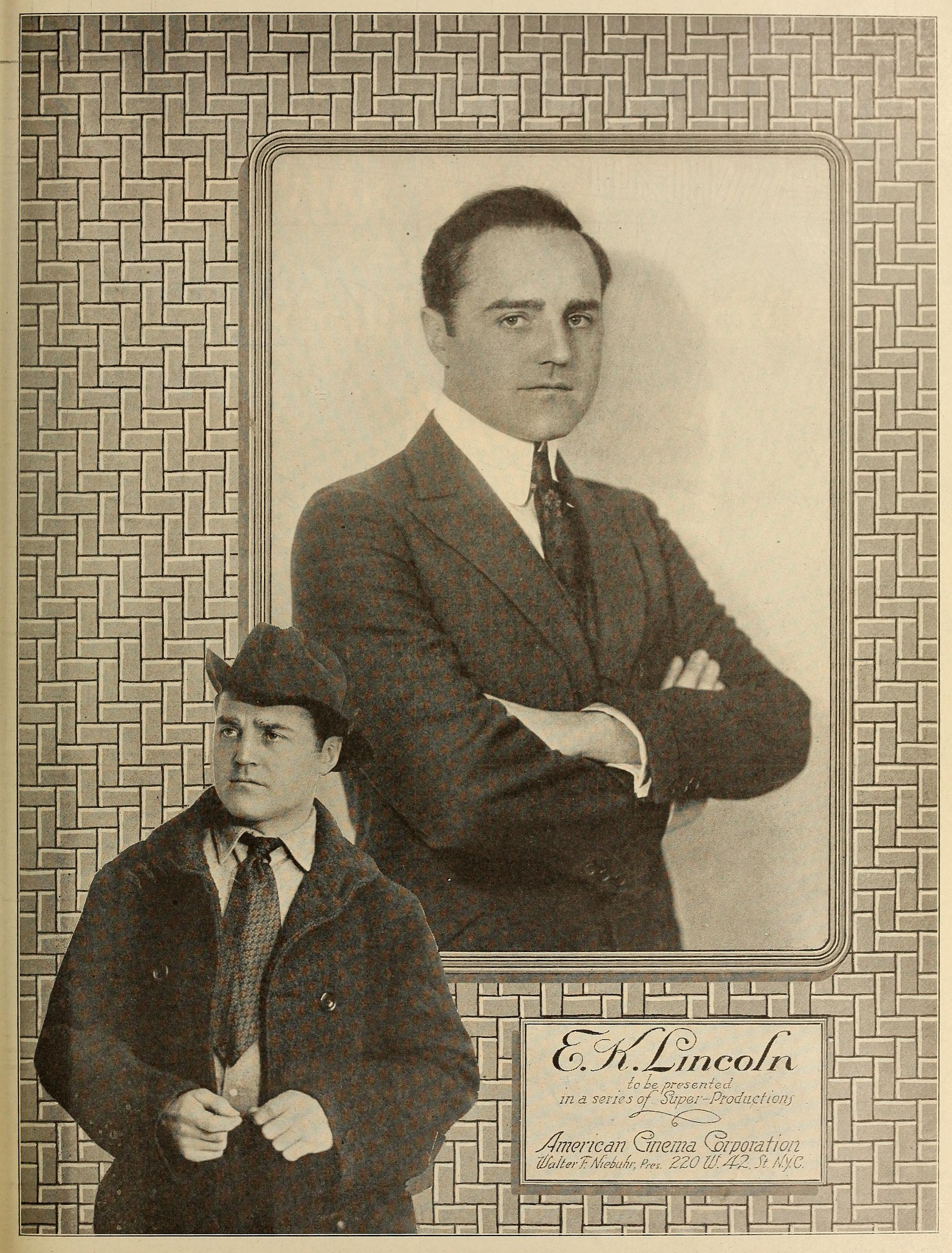
- Lincoln in 1919
- Born: August 4, 1884; Johnstown, Pennsylvania, U.S.
- Died: January 9, 1958 (aged 73); Malibu, California, U.S.
- Occupation: Actor
- Years active: 1912–1925

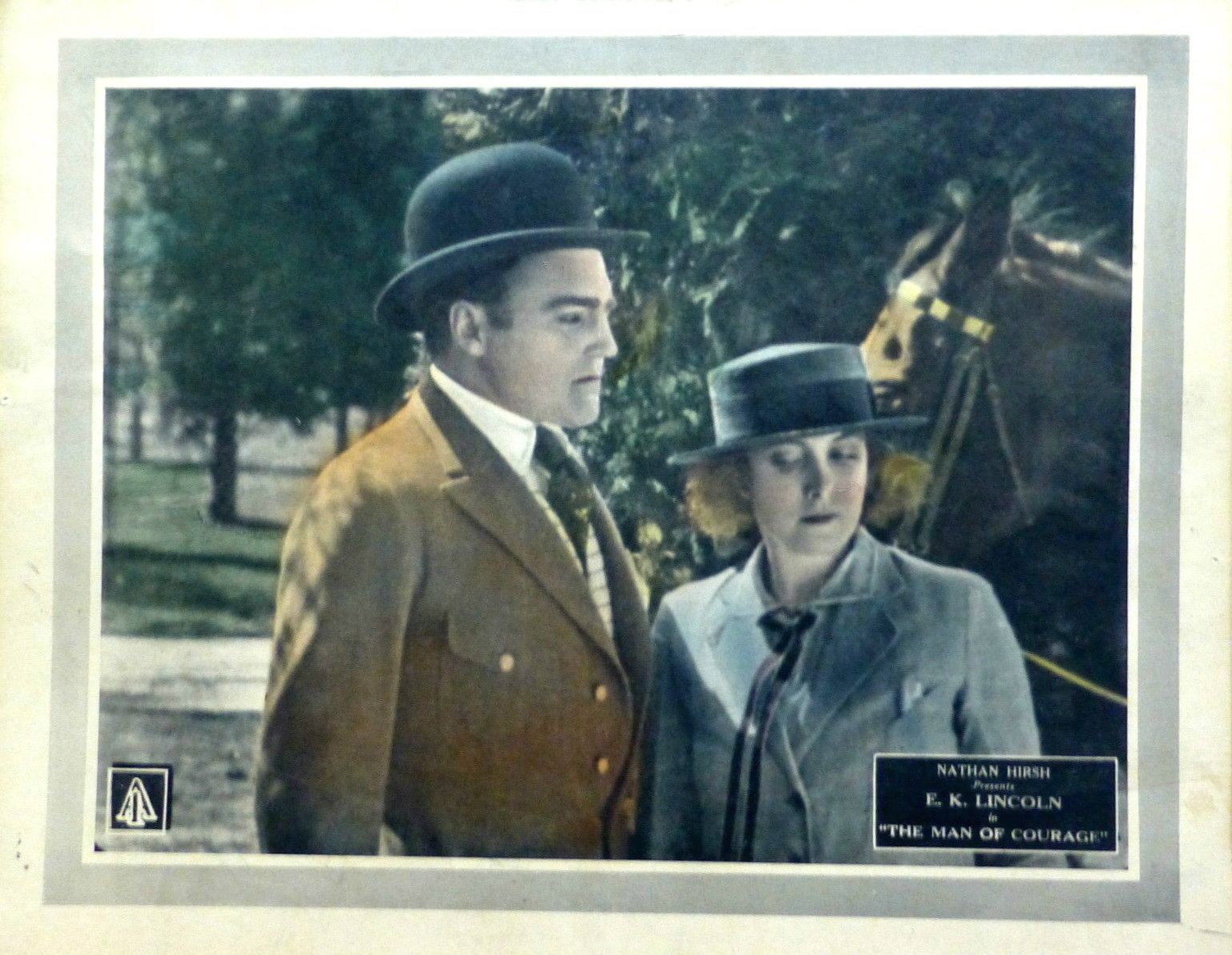
Lincoln and Millicent Fisher in The Man of Courage, 1922

Edward Kline Lincoln (August 8, 1884 – January 9, 1958) was an American silent film actor and director. Lincoln appeared in over 65 silent films and was best known for movies like For the Freedom of the World (1917), The Light in the Dark (1922) and The Man of Courage (1922).

== Biography ==
E. K. Lincoln was born in Johnstown, Pennsylvania. He died in Malibu, California.

== Studio ==
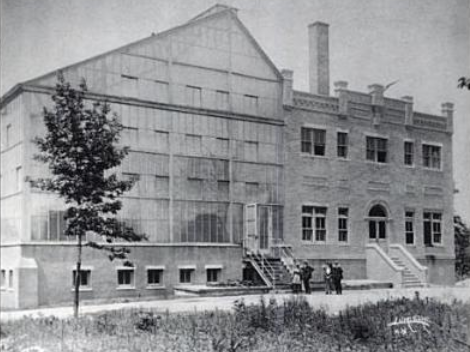

The history of cinema in the United States can trace its roots to the East Coast where, at one time, Fort Lee, New Jersey was the motion picture capital of America. The Grantwood Studio, aka E.K.Lincoln Studio, was built in 1915 on Bergen Boulevard in Grantwood, just south of Fort Lee by Lincoln. Many of the greats of the early film world worked out of this studio and used various spots in the area for location work. The first production was The Fighting Chance in which Lincoln starred alongside Violet Horner, who also starred in The Girl from Alaska (1915).

Between 1916 and 1917, the studio was rented by Fox Film Corporation. In 1920 the United States Photoplay Corporation used it for the film Determination. In 1923, Peter Jones produced the film How High Is Up?.

After World War I many movie makers, including Lincoln, headed out to Hollywood where the climate enable them to film outdoors all year round. According to Film Daily (June 1926), the first episode of The Leather Pushers (1922) with Reginald Denny was filmed at the studio. After talkies came into being in 1927, the studio continued to be used to make Italian and Polish language films.

By the end of the Great Depression, the studio was no longer for film production. The building burnt down the 1960s.

== Partial filmography ==
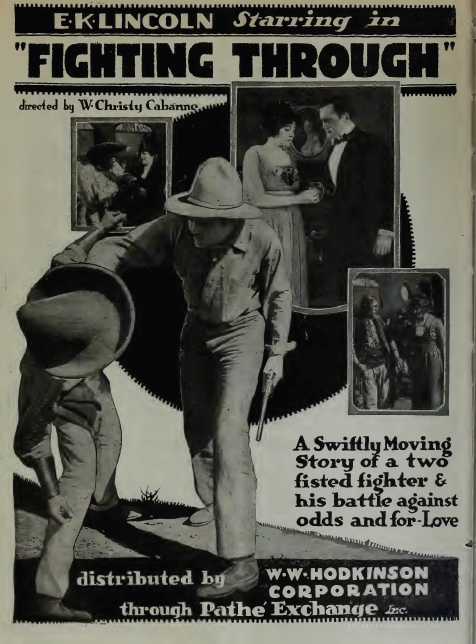
Advertisement for the 1919 film Fighting Through

- His Lordship, the Valet (1912)
- I The Irony of Fate (1912)
- On the Line of Peril (1912)
- Lessons in Courtship (1912)
- A Modern Atlanta (1912)
- Una of the Sierras (1912)
- The Wood Violet (1912)
- The Scoop (1912)
- Song of the Shell (1912)
- Off the Road (1913)
- The Vengeance of Durand (1913)
- When Mary Grew Up (1913)
- How Fatty Made Good (1913)
- Cutey and the Twins (1913)
- The Final Justice (1913)
- A Million Bid (1914)
- The Girl from Alaska (1915 film)
- The Almighty Dollar (1916)
- The Beloved Traitor (1918)
- Lafayette, We Come (1918)
- Fighting Through (1919)
- Desert Gold (1919)
- The Woman God Changed (1921)
- The Light in the Dark (1922)
- The Man of Courage (1922)
- Women Men Marry (1922)
- The Little Red Schoolhouse (1923)
- The Woman in Chains (1923)
- The Right of the Strongest (1924)
- My Neighbor's Wife (1925)
