= Margueritte =

Margueritte is the surname of:

- Arnaud Margueritte (born 1973), French footballer
- Jean Auguste Margueritte (1823-1870), French general
- Louis Margueritte (born 1984), French politician
- Paul Margueritte (1860-1918), Algerian-born French writer, son of the general
- Victor Margueritte (1866–1942), Algerian-born French writer, son of the general

== See also ==
- Ève Paul-Margueritte (1885-1971), French novelist, translator; daughter of Paul Margueritte
- Lucie Paul-Margueritte (1886-1955), French writer, translator; daughter of Paul Margueritte
- Marguerite (disambiguation)
