= La Garçonne =

La Garçonne (French: the flapper) may refer to:

- La Garçonne (novel), a 1922 French novel by Victor Margueritte
- one of four film adaptations of this novel
  - La Garçonne (1923 film), censored and banned by the French authorities; see Censorship in France § List of censored films
  - La Garçonne (1936 film), directed by Victor Margueritte
  - La Garçonne (1957 film), with René Lefèvre
  - La Garçonne (1988 television film), a French television drama
- Garçonne (magazine), a defunct German magazine for lesbians
- La Garçonne (2020 TV series), a French police television drama

== See also ==
- Garonne, a river in France and Spain
- Garçon (disambiguation)
