= Road signs in Denmark =

Road sign in Copenhagen denoting an unsecured railroad crossing to the right of an upcoming intersection

Road signs in Denmark are regulated by the Road Traffic Act (Danish: Færdselsloven). The Danish Minister of Transport is responsible for the design and definitions of road signs, and issues executive orders on the subject. The latest executive orders were issued on April 13, 2023.

Denmark signed the Vienna Convention on Road Signs and Signals on November 8, 1968 and ratified it on November 3, 1986. Denmark has ratified the European Agreement supplementing the Convention on road traffic as well.

Road signs are divided into two main categories, which are traffic signs and direction / tourist information signs.

== Warning signs ==
Outside built-up areas, (Note: Built-up areas (urban areas), are in this context areas within the signs for entering and leaving a built-up area. and) warning signs, except A18, A35, A74, A75 and A92, (Note: These signs are placed at a different distance than the other warning signs: A18: Two-way traffic A35: Dangerous shoulder A74: Level crossing A75: Distance to level crossing A92: Quayside The distance at which these signs are placed, is found in the description of the signs in §12 of executive order 425 from 2023) are usually placed from 150m to 250m before the danger. If the warning signs are placed beyond this distance, the distance is shown on a subpanel. Inside built-up areas, warning signs can be placed at a shorter distance from the danger, without the distance being shown on a subpanel.

A11: Dangerous junction with a non-priority road (Variants: and)

A16: Roundabout

A17: Pedestrian crossing

A18: Two-way traffic

A19: Traffic signals

A20: Traffic queue

A21: Cyclists

A22: Children

UA22: School

A23: Equestrians

A26: Wild animals crossing

A27: Domestic animals

A31: Slippery road

UA31: Road can be icy

A33: Loose chippings

A34: Rockfall

A35: Dangerous shoulder

A36: Speed bump

A36.1: Actibump (Note: Experimental sign. An actibump is a method of traffic calming. It is being tested in two places in Denmark.)

A37: Uneven road

A38: Dip

A39: Roadworks

A41.1: Curve to the right

A41.2: Curve to the left

A42.1: Multiple curves, first to the right

A42.2: Multiple curves, first to the left

UA41: Recommended speed in curves

A43.1: Road narrows

UA43.1: Narrow road (Note: Used at the beginning of a 2-1 road in combination with A43.1)

A43.2: Road narrows to the left

A43.3: Road narrows to the right

UA43: Width limit

A44: Tunnel (formerly used)

A46.1 Downward gradient

A46.2: Upward gradient

A72: Level crossing without gates

UA72: Watch out for trains

A73: Level crossing with gates

UA73: Overhead electricity lines at level crossing

A74.1: Single track level crossing

A74.2: Multi track level crossing

A75: Distance to level crossing

A91: Opening bridge

A92: Quayside

A95: Side winds

A96: Low airplanes

A97: Low helicopters

A99: Other danger (specified on subpanel)

UA99: Accident-prone intersection

== Priority signs ==
B11: Yield

UB11.1: Stop ahead

UB11.2: Two-way cycle track or lane crossing

UB11.3: Light rail crossing

B13: Stop

B15: Lane merge

B16: Main road

B17: End of main road

B18: Priority for oncoming vehicles

B19: Priority over oncoming vehicles

== Prohibitory signs ==
C11.1: No right turn

C11.2: No left turn (Note: Performing a U-turn is also prohibited)

C12: No U-turns

C19: No entry

C21: Driving in both directions prohibited

C22.1: No motor vehicles

C22.2: No motorcycles or large mopeds

C23.1: No heavy goods vehicles

C23.2: No buses

C23.3: No vehicles carrying dangerous goods

C24.1: No tractors or motorized equipment

C24.2: No horse-drawn vehicles or similar

C25.1: No bicycles or small mopeds (Note: The bicycle symbol also applies to a class of vehicles called small mopeds (50cc and restricted to max 30 km/h))

C25.2: No small mopeds

C26.1: No riding or leading a horse

C26.2: No pedestrians

C31: Max weight

C32: Max weight of roadtrain

C35: Max axle load

C36: Max bogie load

C41: Max width of vehicle with load

C42: Max height of vehicle with load

C43: Max length of vehicle

C51: No overtaking

C52: No overtaking by heavy goods vehicle

C53: End of no overtaking

C54: End of no overtaking by heavy goods vehicle

C55: Local speed limit (Note: The speed limit is in force until it is lifted by the sign "C59 end of local speed limit", "C59 End of prohibition", another local speed limit sign or after a distance indicated on a subpanel. (The built-up area sign is also a speed limit sign))

C56: End of local speed limit

UC56: Built-up area subpanel

UC57: End of local speed limit subpanel

C59: End of prohibition

C63: No parking for bicycles

C92: Continuing without stop prohibited
Parking/stopping signs and subpanels

C61: No stopping

C62: No parking

UC33: Limited parking

UC61: No stopping subpanel

UC62: No parking subpanel

UC60.1: Restriction applies before and after sign

UC60.2: Restriction begins at sign

UC60.3: Restriction ends at sign

UC60.5: No stopping on shoulder

UC60.6: No parking on shoulder

UC60.7: Parking on shoulder allowed

UC60.8: Parking partly on sidewalk allowed

== Mandatory signs ==
D11.1: Mandatory direction

D11.2: Mandatory direction

D11.3: Mandatory direction

D11.4: Mandatory direction

D11.5: Mandatory direction

D11.6: Mandatory direction

D11.7: Mandatory direction

D11.8: Mandatory direction

D12: Mandatory direction in the roundabout

D15.2: Mandatory passage

D15.3: Mandatory passage

D16: Passage

D21: Cycleway

UD1: Subpanel which points to lane or path

UD21.1: Two-way cycle traffic

UD21.2: End of Two-way cycle traffic

D22: Footway

D23: Bridleway

D26: Segregated path

D26.1: Segregated path

D26.2: Segregated path

D26.3: Segregated path

D26.4: Segregated path

D26.5: Segregated path

D27: Combined path

D27.1: Combined path

D55: Minimum speed

D56: End of minimum speed

== Special regulation signs ==
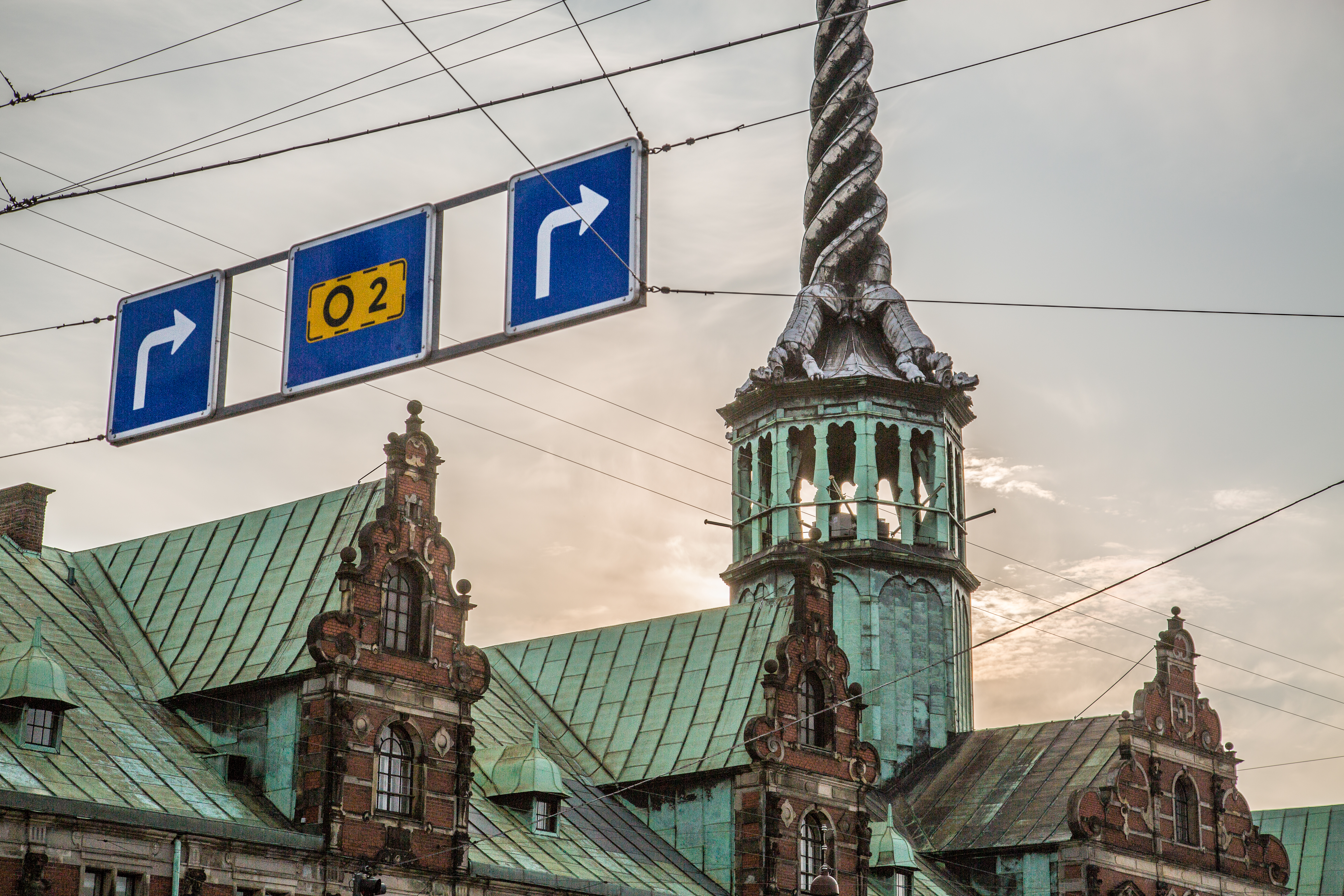
A photo of the signs shown to the left on this page (E11). They are suspended above the lanes of the road, to indicate if vehicles in the lane have to turn left or right or drive straight through the intersection. Arrows are below on the road surface too, within the lane markings.

E11.1: Continue straight

E11.4: Turn left

E11.5: Turn right

E11.6: Continue straight or turn left

E11.7: Continue straight or turn right

E11.8: Turn left or right

E11.9: Continue straight, turn left or right
Area signs

E42: Motorway

E43: Expressway

E44: End of Motorway

E45: End of Expressway

E47: Bicycle boulevard

E48: End of Bicycle boulevard

E49: Pedestrian zone

E50: End of Pedestrian zone

E51: Living street

E52: End of living street

E53: Zone with traffic calming

E53: End of zone with traffic calming

E55: Urban area

E56: End of urban area

E68: Zone with no parking

E68.2: Zone with no stopping

E68.3: Zone with parking

E68.4: Zone with local speed limit

E68.5: No heavy goods vehicles permitted zone

E68.9: Low-emission zone

E69: End of zone with no parking

E69.3: End of zone with parking

E69.4: End of zone with local speed limit

E69.5: End of zone with no heavy goods vehicles

E69.9: End of low-emission zone

E70: Parking zone information

E80+UE80: General speed limits (Note: This diagram consists of two signs: the upper part indicates the speed limits, and the lower part indicates that it is mandatory to use seat belts and headlights.)

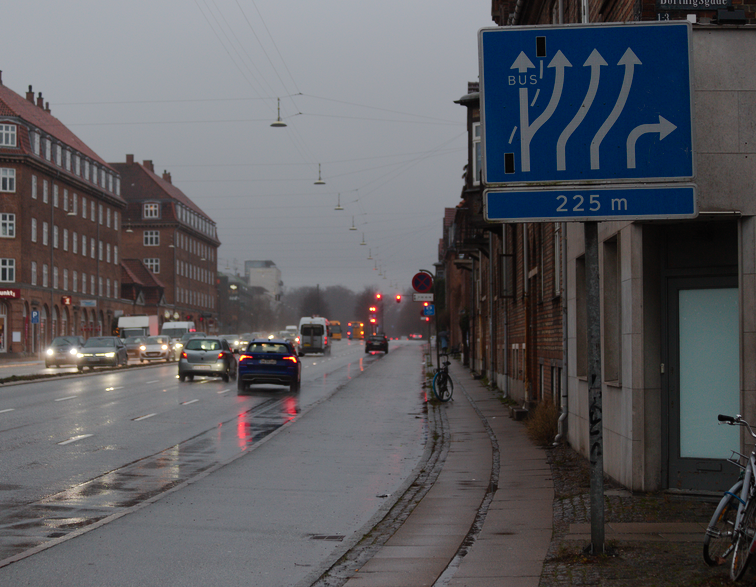
Direction of lanes at intersection (E15)

Other special regulation signs

E15: Lanes at intersection

E16.1: Reduction of number of lanes with lane-merge

E16.2: Reduction of number of lanes with lane-change

E17: Pedestrian crossing. (Variant:)

E18: Dead end. (Note: Variants:)

E19: One way

E21.1: Recommended route for cyclists

E21.2: Recommended route for pedestrians

E21.3: Recommended route for equestrians

E21.4: Recommended route for mopeds

E22.1: Recommended route for heavy goods vehicles

E22.2: Recommended route for hazardous goods vehicles

E22.3: Recommended route for tractors and motorized equipment

E22.4: Recommended route for busses

E23: Instructions for disabled

E24: Instructions for visually impaired

E26.1: Pedestrian overpass

E26.2: Pedestrian underpass

E30: Light rail stop

E31: Bus stop

E31: Taxi stand

E33.1: Parking

E33.2: Indoor parking

UE33.1: Before and after sign

UE33.2: After sign

UE33.3: Before sign

UE33.4: Charging

E34: Breakdown bay (formerly used)

UE34: Fire extinguisher and emergency phone

E35: Tunnel

E37: Crawler lane begins

E39: Advisory maxspeed

E40: End of advisory maxspeed

E41: Recommended max speed on slip road

E90: Traffic enforcement camera

E91: Speed feedback sign

E92: Variable-message sign

E93: Video surveillance

== Direction signs ==
Direction signs used on roads

F11: Flag-type direction sign

F11: Flag-type direction sign

F11: Flag-type direction sign

F11: Flag-type direction sign

F12: Flag-type direction sign

F12: Flag-type direction sign

F34.2: Flag-type traffic diversion sign (Note: Signs for permanent traffic diversion routes, when the motorway is closed.)

F13: Flag-type direction sign

F13: Flag-type direction sign

F13: Flag-type direction sign

F14: Temporary flag-type direction sign

F14: Temporary flag-type direction sign

F16: Exit sign

F18: Stack-type direction signs

F34.1: Traffic diversion route
Direction signs used on paths for pedestrians, cyclists and equestrians

F21.1: Bicycle route

F21.2: Flag-type direction sign

F21.2.2: Flag-type direction sign

F21.2.3: Flag-type direction sign

F21.3: Stack-type direction sign

F21.4: Map-type advance direction sign
Direction signs for parking

F33.1: Flag-type direction sign

F33.2: Stack-type direction sign
Advance direction signs on roads

G11: Portal sign

G14: Map-type advance direction sign

F34.3: Map-type traffic diversion sign

G15: Lane diagram sign

G18: Stack-type advance direction sign

== Distance and locality signs ==
H41: Distance sign

H42: Split distance sign

H45: Locality

H46: Regional border

H47: Municipal border

H49: National park

H49.1: Nature park

H50: Leaving national park

H50.1: Leaving nature park

H51: National Border

== Signs used on motorways ==
On motorways, direction signs have blue background when they lead to the ordinary road network, via an exit from the motorway, Directions have green background when they lead to the destination via the motorway(s).

I12: Exit from motorway in 500 m

I11: Exit from motorway

I13: Exit from motorway in 1500m ‒ the lower sign displays the following exit (with its number) and destination to be reached

I13: Exit from motorway in 1500m ‒ the lower sign displays the following named motorway junction

I16: Exit to another motorway

I17: Exit to another motorway in 500m

I18: Exit to another motorway in 1500m

I20: Motorway junction (system interchange)
Lane and advance direction signs used on motorways

J11: Assigned lane(s) (Note: The sign is placed above a lane before a split in the motorway, or before an exit. The signs can contain additional information as well as arrow(s) pointing down to the lane(s))

J11: Assigned lane(s)

J11: Assigned lane(s)

J12: Lane diagram

J13: Map-type advance direction sign
Confirmatory-distance and tourist information signs used on motorways

K11: Route confirmation

K12: Distance information

K30: Tourist information

== Route designations ==
A dashed line around the route number means that the road connects to the route with that number.

L41: E-Road

L42: Primary route

L43: Secondary route

L44: Ring road

L45: National bicycle route

L45.2: Regional or local bicycle route

L46: Bicycle highway

L47: EuroVelo

L50: Marguerite route (tourist route)

== Service signs ==
New service signs are designed when they are required, for example by request from a business. (Note: The permission to do this is found in §359 ¶2 in Executive Order 426 from 2023.) Proposed additions include "electrician" and "real estate agent".

M9: Container and cargo port

M10: Ferry for pedestrians and bicycles

M11: Car ferry

M12: Airport

M13: Train station
(formerly used)

M13.1: S-train station

M13.2 Metro station

M13.3: Light rail station

M14: Bus station

M15: Freight terminal

M16: Park and ride
(formerly used)

M17: Post Office

M18: Hub (communal transport)

M21: Hospital emergency department, open 24 hours a day

M22: Telephone

M23: Breakdown service

M24: Filling station

M24.1: Charging station for EV

M24.2: Charging and filling station

M30: Primitive camp site for hikers

M31: Camping and caravan site

M31.1: Site exclusively for caravans

M32: Autocamper site

M33: Camping cabins

M34: Rest area

M34.1: Rest area for cyclists

M35: Beach or swimming pool

M35.1: Indoor swimming pool

M36: Golf Course

M37: Put and take fishing

M38: Observation tower

M41: Youth hostel

M42: Hotel

M43: Restaurant

M45: Cafeteria

M46: Toilet

M46.1: Toilet (handicapped)

M47: Emptying chemical toilet

M47.1: Emptying chemical toilet

M51: Church

M52: Place of Interest

M53: Unesco world heritage site

M54: National Park

M57: Industrial area

M61: Information point

M101: Grocery store

M102: Room to let

M103: Baker

M104: Butcher

M105: Hairdresser

M107: Florist

M109: Bookshop

M111: Café

M112: Farm shop

M113: Antiques

M114: Garden centre, plant nursery etc.

M115: Marina

M116: Nature reserve

M117: Trail shelter

M118: Sports facility

M119: Car dealership, car rental

M120: Commercial district

M121: Shopping center, street, etc.

M123: Education

M124: Veterinary clinic or hospital

M125: Kindergarten etc.

M126: Art, pottery, etc.

M127: Military

M128: Hospital

M129: Public offices

M130: Cultural center

M131: Recycling

M132: Pharmacy

M133: Cinema

M134: Wellness, massage, beauty clinic, etc.

M138: Picnic area, indoor or outdoor

M140: Cohousing

M143: Stud farm

M144: Winery

M145: Drivers education

M146: Forest burial ground (cremated remains)

== Additional subpanels ==
These signs can be placed below traffic and direction signs. Subpanels with blue background are combined with signs that have blue background, and subpanels with white background with signs that have white background. The signs can for instance be used below parking restriction signs to indicate which time of day, what day(s) of the week or the duration of parking for which the restriction applies,

U1.1: Distance (here in 500 meters)

U1.2: Distance (here in 500 meters)

U2.1: Distance interval (here from 200 to 800 meters)

U2.2: Distance interval (here from 200 to 800 meters)

U3.1: Length of time (here 1 hour)

U3.2: Day of week (here Wednesday)

U3.3: Time of day on weekdays. If in parentheses, Saturdays, if in red, Sundays or holidays. (here from 8 AM to 5 PM weekdays, from 8 AM to 2 PM Saturdays and from 9 AM to 12 AM on Sundays or holidays

U3.4:: Length of time (here 1 hour)

U3.5: Day of week (here Wednesday)

U3.6: Time of day on weekdays. If in parentheses, Saturdays, if in red, Sundays or holidays. (here from 8 AM to 5 PM weekdays, from 8 AM to 2 PM Saturdays and from 9 AM to 12 AM on Sundays or holidays

U4.1: Type(s) of vehicle (here heavy goods vehicle)

U4.2: Type(s) of vehicle (here heavy goods vehicle)

U5.1: Bicycles and small mopeds exempt

U5.2: Bicycles and small mopeds exempt

U6.3: A sign combination this panel is a part of, takes effect after a right turn in the intersection ahead

U6.4: A sign combination this panel is a part of, takes effect after a right turn in the intersection ahead

U7: Bicycles and small mopeds may make right turn when traffic signal is red.

== Symbols ==
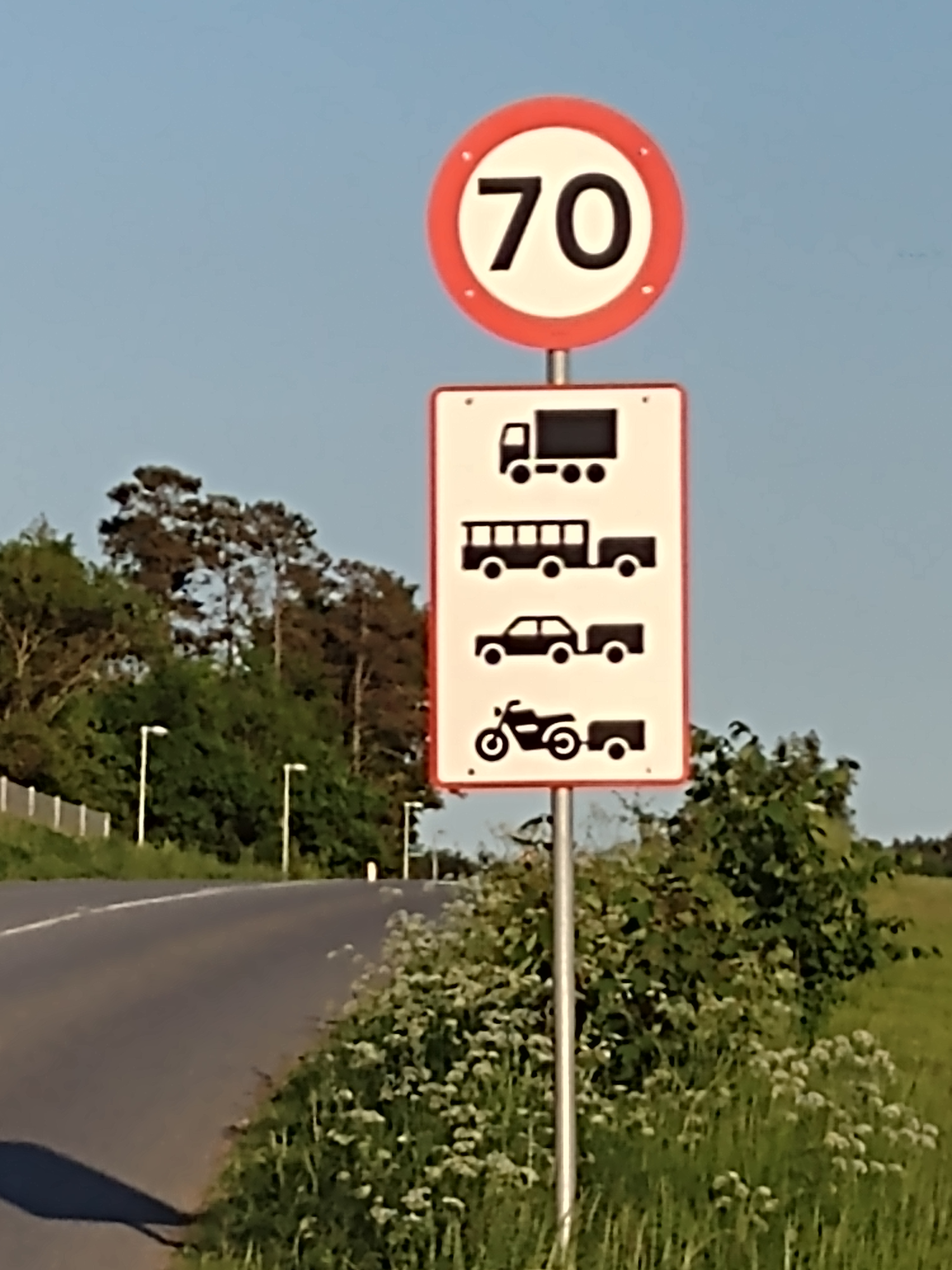
A 70 km/h speed limit sign which applies only to the vehicles displayed in the subpanel.

US1: Car (not above 3.5 ton registered weight)

US2: Heavy goods vehicle with or without a trailer

US3: Bus (above 3.5 ton registered weight, or is allowed to carry more than 8 passengers)

US4: Heavy goods vehicle with trailer

US5: Trailer

US6: Caravan

US7: Motorhome

US8: Bicycle or small moped

US9:Small moped

US10: Motorcycle or large moped

US11: Tractor or motorized equipment

US12: Disabled

US13: Light rail

== Historic signs ==
A21: Cyclists

A22: Children

Slippery road

A99: Other danger

B13: Stop

C12: No U-turn

Goods vehicles prohibited

C51: No overtaking

D21: Cycleway

D22: Footway

D27: Combined path

E17: Pedestrian crossing

E33.1: Parking

=== 1932 road signs ===
Danger

Uneven road

Series of bends

Crossroad

Level crossing with barriers

Level crossing without barriers

No motor vehicles

Do not enter

No parking

Mandatory direction

Pedestrian crossing

Roundabout

Parking

Weight limit

Speed limit

Yield

Priority road

Priority road ends

First aid

=== 1955 road signs ===
==== Warning signs ====
Uneven road

Left curve

Right curve

Left double curve

Right double curve

Crossroad

Crossroad with priority

Roundabout

Level crossing with gates

Level crossing without gates

Dangerous hill

Road narrows

Roadworks

Slippery road

Pedestrian crossing ahead

Children

Bicycle crossing

Tram crossing

Opening bridge

Wild animals

Other danger

Yield

Single track level crossing

Multi track level crossing

Countdown baecon

Countdown baecon

Countdown baecon

Countdown baecon

==== Prohibitory signs ====
No entry

No left turn

No right turn

No U-turn

No overtaking

Yield to oncoming traffic

No motor vehicles

No goods vehicles

No bicycles

Width limit

Height limit

Weight limit

Axle load limit

Speed limit

Speed limit ends

Stop

Customs

Restricted stopping or parking

==== Mandatory signs ====
Turn right

Turn left

Keep right

Keep left

Lane split

Bicycle path

Motor vehicles only

==== Information signs ====
Priority road

Priority road ends

Pedestrian crossing

Parking

Filling station

First aid or hospital

Priority over oncoming traffic

Lane direction (turn left)

Lane direction (turn right)

Lane direction (go straight)
