= Marguerite (given name) =

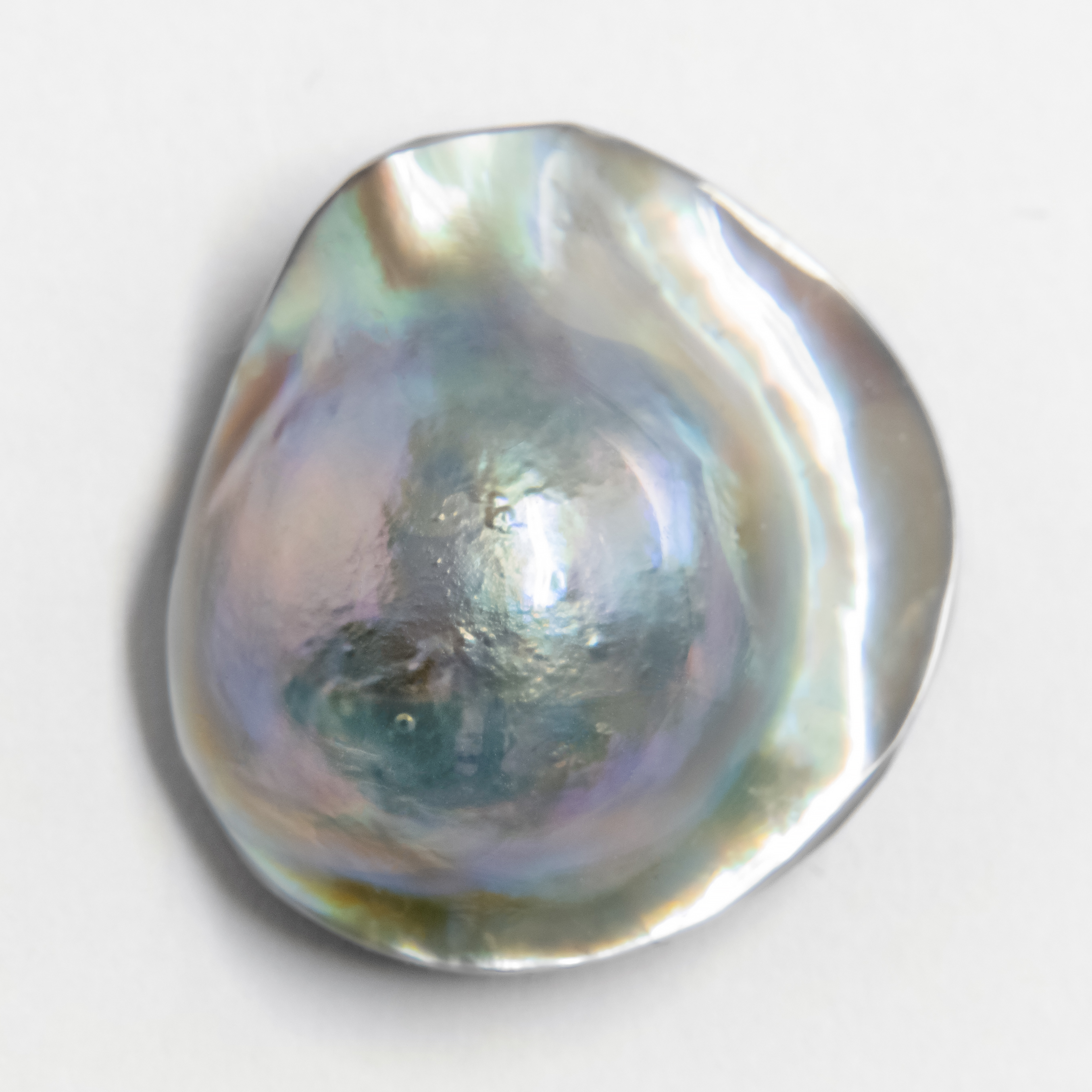
- A pearl, from which Marguerite maintains this meaning, deriving from the Latin and Greek origins.
- Gender: Female
- Language: French

Origin
- Origin: Latin and Greek
- Meaning: "Pearl"

Other names
- Nicknames: Rita, Marge
- Related names: Margaret, Margarita, Margherita, Margo, Marge, Margot,

Marguerite is a French female given name, from which the English name Margaret is derived. Marguerite derives via Latin and Greek μαργαρίτης (margarítēs), meaning 'pearl'. It is also a French name for the ox-eye daisy flower.

== People ==
=== Nobility ===
- Margaret of Bourbon (1438–1483) or Marguerite de Bourbon, Princess of Savoy by marriage
- Margaret of France (1553–1615) or Marguerite de Valois, wife of Henry IV of France and Navarre
- Margaret of France, Duchess of Berry or Marguerite de Valois (1523–1574), daughter of King Francis I of France
- Margaret, Countess of Anjou or Marguerite d'Angou (1273–1299), Countess of Anjou and Maine in her own right and Countess of Valois, Alençon, Chartres and Perche by marriage
- Marguerite de Navarre (1492–1549), princess of France, Queen of Navarre and Duchess of Alençon and Berry
- Marguerite III de Neufchâtel (1480–1544), German-Roman monarch as Princess Abbess of the Imperial Remiremont Abbey in France
- Marguerite Louise d'Orléans (1645–1721), Grand Duchess of Tuscany by marriage
- Marguerite of Lorraine (1615–1672), princess of Lorraine and Duchess of Orléans by marriage
- Marguerite, Baroness de Reuter (1912–2009), European aristocrat and member of the family that founded the Reuters news service
- Marguerite, bâtarde de France (1407–1458), illegitimate daughter of Charles VI and Odette de Champdivers, legitimized by Charles VII
- Marguerite de Cambis (fl. 1550s), French noblewoman and translator
- Marguerite, Duchess of Rohan (1617–1684), French noblewoman
- Princess Marguerite Adélaïde of Orléans (1846–1893), princess of France and, by marriage, princess of the House of Czartoryski
- Marguerite de Saint-Marceaux (1850–1930), French aristocrat and salonnière
- Marguerite Aimery Harty de Pierrebourg (1856–1943), French baroness, salonnière and writer published as Claude Ferval

=== Other ===
- Marguerite (singer) (born 2000), French singer
- Marguerite Elizabeth Abbott (1870–1953), American painter and teacher
- Marguerite Alibert (1890–1971), French socialite and courtesan, mistress of Edward VIII, acquitted of killing her husband at the Savoy Hotel in London.
- Marguerite Bériza (1880–after 1930), French opera soprano
- Marguerite Bernes (1901–1996), Algerian nun recognised as Righteous Among the Nations
- Marguerite Bourgeoys (1620–1700), saint and founder of the Congregation of Notre Dame, Montreal, Quebec, Canada
- Marguerite Bowman (1918–1997), American politician
- Marguerite Broquedis (1893–1983), French tennis player
- Marguerite Lucile Brésil (1880–1961), French actress, model, and singer
- Marguerite Carré (1880–1947), French opera soprano
- Marguerite Charpentier (1848-1904), French art collector and salonist
- Marguerite Davis (1887–1967), American chemist, co-discoverer of vitamins A and B
- Marguerite de Angeli (1889–1987), American writer and illustrator of children's books
- Marguerite De La Motte (1902–1950), American film actress
- Marguerite de la Sablière (c. 1640–1693), French salonist and polymath
- Marguerite de Lussan (1682–1758), French historic novelist
- Marguerite Derricks (born 1961), American choreographer
- Marguerite Dilhan (1876–1956) was a French lawyer, first woman in France to open her own practice and plead in a criminal Cour d'assises
- Marguerite Duras (1914–1996), French writer and film director
- Marguerite Fourrier (fl. 1900), French tennis player
- Marguerite Frank (1927–2024), American−French mathematician
- Marguerite Gaut (1888–1967), American golfer
- Marguerite Genès (1868–1955), French woman of letters and teacher who wrote in Occitan and French
- Marguerite Georges (1787–1867), noted French actress who had an affair with Napoleon
- Marguerite Grépon (1891–1982), French journalist and writer
- Marguerite Henry (1902–1997), American writer of children's books
- Marguerite Henry (scientist) (1895–1982), Australian zoologist
- Marguerite Higgins Hall (1920-1966), American war correspondent and first woman to win the Pulitzer Prize for Foreign Correspondence for her coverage of the Korean War
- Marguerite Kirmse (1885–1954), British-American artist
- Marguerite Kofio (born 1955), Central African politician and women's rights activist.
- Marguerite L. Smith (1894–1985), New York assemblywoman 1920–1921
- Marguerite Vincent Lawinonkié (1783-1865), Huron-Wendat craftswoman
- Marguerite Long (1874–1966), French pianist and teacher
- Marguerite St. Leon Loud (1812-1889), American poet and writer
- Marguerite Louppe (1902–1989), French painter
- Marguerite Lundgren (1916–1983), British/Swedish eurythmist and anthroposophist
- Marguerite Mareuse (1889–1964), French racing driver
- Marguerite Massart (1900–1979), first woman to graduate as an engineer in Belgium.
- Marguerite Moore (1849–?), Irish-Catholic orator, patriot, activist
- Marguerite Moreau (born 1977), American actress
- Marguerite McKee Moss, American socialite
- Marguerite Narbel (1918–2010), Swiss biologist and politician
- Marguerite Norris (1927–1994), Detroit Red Wings team president, first female NHL team executive, first woman to have her name engraved on the Stanley Cup
- Marguerite Oswald, mother of Lee Harvey Oswald
- Marguerite Courtright Patton (1889–1971), American civic leader and anti-communist
- Marguerite Perey (1909–1975), French physicist
- Marguerite Perrin, American Trading Spouses participant
- Marguerite Pindling (born 1932), Governor-General of the Bahamas beginning 2014
- Marguerite Porete (died 1310), French-speaking mystic
- Marguerite Porter Zwicker (1904–1993), Canadian watercolor painter and art promoter
- Marguerite Helen Power (1870–1957), Australian poet
- Marguerite Quimby (1896–1983), American politician
- Marguerite Quinn, American politician elected to the Pennsylvania House of Representatives in 2006
- Marguerite Ramadan (born 1953), Central African politician and women's rights advocate
- Marguerite Scypion (c. 1770s–after 1836), African-Natchez slave who filed the first "freedom suit" and ended Indian slavery in the state of Missouri in 1836
- Marguerite Tinayre (1831–1895), French educator, writer and socialist
- Marguerite Yourcenar (1903–1987), Belgian-born French novelist and essayist, first woman elected to the Académie française
- Marguerite Zorach (1887–1968), American painter, textile artist and graphic designer
- Maya Angelou (1928–2014), American author, poet, dancer, actress and singer, born Marguerite Annie Johnson
- Saint Marguerite d'Youville (1701-1771), French Canadian widow who founded the Order of Sisters of Charity of Montreal

== Fictional characters ==
- Marguerite St. Just, wife of the Scarlet Pimpernel in the novel by the same name
- Marguerite Gautier, the heroine in the Alexandre Dumas fils novel La Dame aux Camelias
- Marguerite Volant, main character of the 1996 Canadian mini-series by the same name
- Marguerite Krux, financier of an expedition to a Lost World in the late 1990s TV series The Lost World based on a book by Sir Arthur Conan Doyle
- Marguerite, the heroine of Gounod's opera Faust
- Marguerite Baker, an antagonist and member of the Baker family in the horror video game Resident Evil 7: Biohazard
- Marguerite Murphy; an elderly resident in Sunnyvale on the show Trailer Park Boys
- Marguerite Caine, main protagonist and heroine of Claudia Gray's "Firebird Series" beginning with "A Thousand Pieces of You"

== See also ==
- Magritte
- Margueritte
- Marguerite (disambiguation)
