= La Garçonne (1923 film) =

1923 French silent film by Armand du Plessy

- Directed by: Armand du Plessy
- Written by: Victor Margueritte
- Based on: La Garçonne by Victor Margueritte
- Produced by: Armand du Plessy
- Starring: France Dhélia
- Cinematography: Emile Repelin
- Distributed by: De Bande, Biava
- Release date: September 1923 (France)
- Running time: 70 mins
- Country: France/Belgium
- Language: French (intertitles)

La Garçonne ("The Bachelor Girl" or "The Flapper"), renamed Anne Corlac after being banned by the French film censorship board, was a Franco-Belgian silent drama film directed by Belgian director Armand du Plessy, made in 1923 and banned from export by the French national censorship board. It was an adaptation of the novel La Garçonne by Victor Margueritte, published a year earlier. The lead female role was played by France Dhélia. The film's current survival status is unknown.

== Plot summary ==
The film follows Monique, a naive bourgeois woman promised a respectable marriage, but who rebels against her social class upon discovering her future husband has a lover. She then enters a world of debauchery and abuse, previously unknown to her, in which she discovers herself and finds love and freedom.

== Cast ==
- France Dhélia as Monique Lerbier
- Gaston Jacquet as Lucien Vigneret
- Jean Toulout as Régis Boisselot
- Renée Carl as Mme Ambrat
- René Maupré as Georges
- Georges Deneubourg as M. Lerbier
- José Davert as Baron Plombino
- Johanna Sutter as Anika Gobroni

== Historical context and censorship ==
In the 1920s, author Victor Margueritte wrote about the social issues of his time, particularly women's emancipation. His novel La Garçonne, published in 1922, sparked a heated controversy due to its scenes of debauchery and progressive themes. The book was censored upon its release in France, even leading to the author's stripping of his Legion of Honour award.

The book was nevertheless adapted for film the following year by Armand du Plessy, and was also subject to censorship because of scenes of "lewd dancing" and "indecent touching". In 1926, the stage adaptation, starring Renée Falconetti as Monique Lerbier, also faced opposition from conservative activists such as the Camelots du Roi and some Catholic students.

After being renamed Anne Corlac, the film was occasionally rescreened, despite attempts by the Lyon branch of the Ligue pour le relèvement de la moralité publique (League for the Recovery of Public Morality) to have it permanently banned. The League succeeded under the Vichy regime, which prohibited the film's screening by decree on 11 January 1941, regardless of its title.

The film was released by UFA in Germany in April 1924 as Die Frau am Scheideweg, and in Portugal on 9 March 1925. Its current survival status is unknown.

The novel was subsequently adapted several times using the same title, including in 1936 by Jean de Limur, and in 1957 by Jacqueline Audry. Both versions escaped censorship, significantly toning down the scenes of sapphic lovemaking that had caused a scandal at the time.
