= Marguerite =

Marguerite may refer to:

== People ==
- Marguerite (given name), including a list of people with the name

== Places ==
- Marguerite, Pennsylvania, an unincorporated community
- Marguerite Bay, Antarctic Peninsula
- Marguerite Island, Adélie Land, Antarctica

== Entertainment ==
- Marguerite (musical), a 2008 West End musical by Michel Legrand
- "Margueritte", a song by Oregon from the album Winter Light
- Marguerite (2015 film), a French film
- Marguerite (2017 film), a Canadian film

== Ships ==
- USS Marguerite (SP-193), a United States Navy patrol vessel in commission from 1917 to 1919
- USS Marguerite II (SP-892), another United States Navy patrol vessel in commission from 1917 and 1919; renamed SP-892 in 1918 to avoid confusion
- HMAS Marguerite, a Royal Navy sloop transferred to the Royal Australian Navy in 1920
- Marguerite (ship), a French cargo ship launched in 1912, sunk by a U-boat in 1917
- SS Princess Marguerite, a series of 20th century Canadian coastal vessels.

== Plants ==
- Argyranthemum, a genus of plants in the daisy family, endemic to Macaronesia, especially:
  - Argyranthemum frutescens, native to the Canary Islands
- Garden marguerites, a group of hybrids derived from Argyranthemum and related genera widely sold for garden use
- Leucanthemum vulgare, the original marguerite, a Eurasian flowering plant

== Other uses ==
- Marguerite (horse), a racehorse
- Stanford Marguerite Shuttle, a transportation service of Stanford University

== See also ==
- SS Princess Marguerite, Princess Marguerite II and Princess Marguerite III, a series of Canadian coastal passenger vessels
- Marguerite route, a tourist route in Denmark
- Margarita (disambiguation)
- Margueritte
