= Suzy Solidor =

French singer and actress (1900–1983)

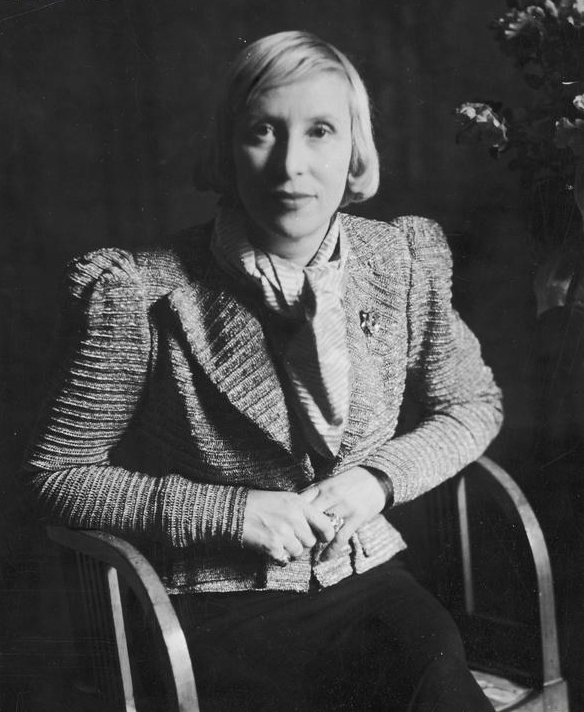
- Solidor in 1938
- Born: Suzanne Louise Marie Marion; 18 December 1900; Brittany, France
- Died: 30 March 1983 (aged 82); Cagnes-sur-Mer, France
- Occupation(s): Singer, actress

Suzy Solidor (18 December 1900 – 30 March 1983) was a French singer and actress, appearing in films such as La Garçonne.

Suzy Solidor was born Suzanne Louise Marie Marion in 1900 in the Pie district of Saint-Servan-sur-Mer in Brittany, France. She was the daughter of Louise Marie Adeline Marion, a 28-year-old single mother. In 1907 she became Suzy Rocher when her mother married Eugène Prudent Rocher. She later changed her name to Suzy Solidor when she moved to Paris in the late 1920s, taking the name from a district of Saint-Servan in which she had lived.

Early in 1930, she became a popular singer and opened a chic nightclub called La Vie Parisienne. She was openly lesbian.

One of the singer’s most famous publicity stunts was to become known as the “most painted woman in the world”. She posed for some of the most celebrated artists of the day including Pablo Picasso, Georges Braque, Raoul Dufy, Tamara de Lempicka, Marie Laurencin, Francis Picabia and Kees van Dongen. Her stipulation for sitting was that she would be given the paintings to hang in her club, and, by this time, she had accumulated thirty-three portraits of herself. La Vie Parisienne became one of the trendiest night spots in Paris.

Solidor's most famous portrait was painted by Tamara de Lempicka.

Solidor met Tamara de Lempicka sometime in the early 1930s, and Suzy asked the artist to paint her. Tamara agreed, but only if she could paint Solidor in the nude. Solidor agreed, and the painting was finished in 1933.

During the occupation, her nightclub was popular with German officers; in 1941 she recorded a version of the song "Lili Marleen" with French words by Henri Lemarchand. After the war she was convicted by the Épuration légale as a collaborator and punished with five years without public activities.

She died on 30 March 1983 in Cagnes-sur-Mer and is buried in the town. Ten years before, in 1973, she gave 40 of her portraits to the village. They are permanently exhibited at the Château-Musée Grimaldi Museum.

She was the subject of the song "Sad Songs" by the English group The Christians in their eponymous first album.
