= Jean Auguste Margueritte =

French General (1823–1870)

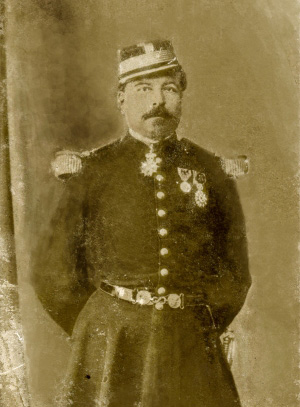
- Born: 15 January 1823; Manheulles, France
- Died: 6 September 1870 (aged 47); Beauraing, Belgium
- Relatives: Paul Margueritte & Victor Margueritte (sons); Ève Paul-Margueritte & Lucie Paul-Margueritte (granddaughters)
- Military career
- Allegiance: Second French Empire
- Service years: 1837–1870
- Rank: Général de division
- Commands: 1st Chasseurs d'Afrique Regiment
- Conflicts: French intervention in Mexico; Franco-Prussian War: Battle of Sedan (DOW)

Jean Auguste Margueritte (15 January 1823 - 6 September 1870), French General, father of Victor Margueritte and Paul Margueritte.

After a career in Algeria, General Margueritte was mortally wounded in the great cavalry charge at Sedan, in which the Emperor was defeated and captured. He died in Belgium. An account of his life was published by his son, Paul Margueritte as Mon père (1884; enlarged ed., 1897).

The sand cat is named in his honour, being given the binomial name Felis margarita.
