= Paul Margueritte =

French amateur mime (1860–1918)

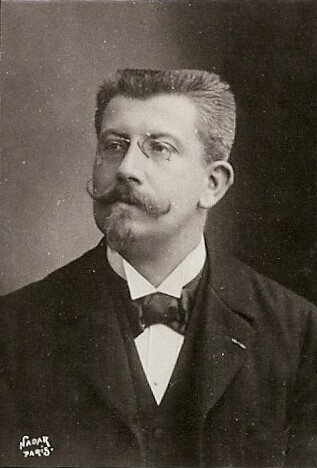
- Margueritte in 1900
- Born: Paul Margueritte; 20 February 1860; Laghouat, French Algeria
- Died: 29 December 1918 (aged 58); Hossegor, France
- Occupations: Mime artist; author
- Years active: 1882–1918
- Children: 2, Ève Paul-Margueritte, Lucie Paul-Margueritte
- Parent: Jean Auguste Margueritte
- Relatives: Victor Margueritte (brother)

Paul Margueritte (20 February 1860 – 29 December 1918) was a French author and amateur mime who wrote several pantomimes, most notably Pierrot assassin de sa femme (Théâtre de Valvins, 1881) and, in collaboration with Fernand Beissier, Colombine pardonnée (Cercle Funambulesque, 1888) as well as a novelist.

Paul Margueritte was born in French Algeria, the son of General Jean Auguste Margueritte (1823–1870), who was mortally wounded in the Battle of Sedan. An account of his life was published by Paul Margueritte as Mon père (1884; enlarged ed., 1897). Paul's name is generally associated with that of his brother, Victor, because of their frequent collaboration.

Margueritte, who has given a picture of his home in Algiers in Le Jardin du passé (1895), was sent to the military school of La Flèche for the sons of officers, and became in 1880 clerk to the minister of public instruction.

Margueritte, along with Paul Bonnetain, J. H. Rosny, Lucien Descaves, and Gustave Guiches, released "The Manifesto of the Five" in Le Figaro in 1887 attacking the profane Realism of Émile Zola's Le Terre. He is the author of a Lesbian novel, entitled Tous Quatre.

The authors Lucie Paul-Margueritte and Ève Paul-Margueritte were his daughters.
