= Lucie Paul-Margueritte =

French writer (1886–1955)

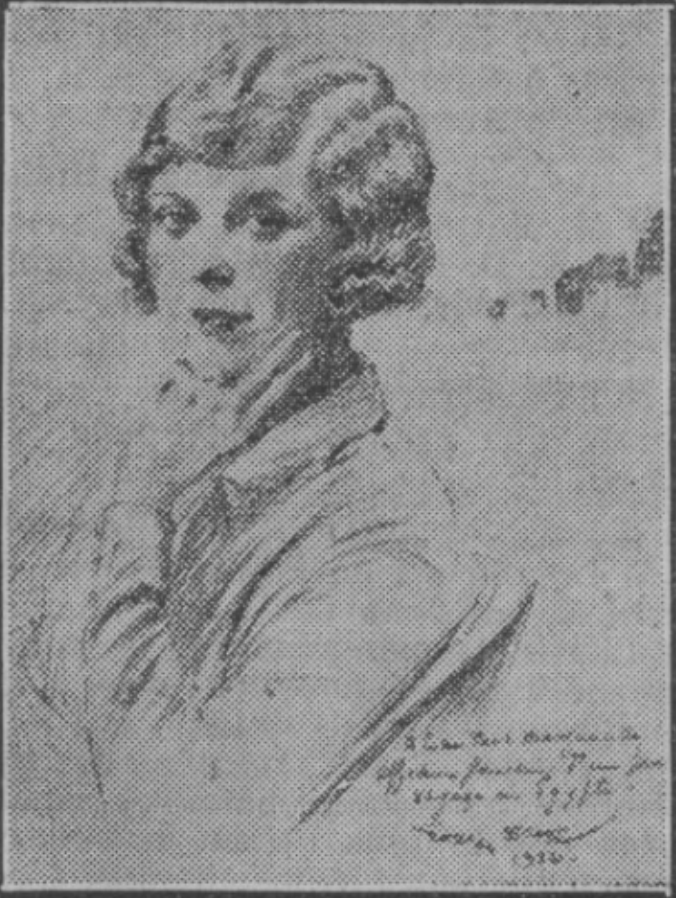
- Portrait, by Georges Scott
- Born: Lucie Blanche Paul-Margueritte; 9 January 1886; Paris, France
- Died: 10 May 1955 (aged 69); Paris, France
- Resting place: Cimetière d'Auteuil, Paris, France
- Occupations: writer; translator
- Spouse: divorced
- Parent: Paul Margueritte
- Relatives: Ève Paul-Margueritte (sister); Jean Auguste Margueritte (grandfather); Victor Margueritte (uncle)
- Writing career
- Language: French
- Genres: novels; non-fiction; plays

Lucie Paul-Margueritte (9 January 1886 - 10 May 1955) was a French-language writer and translator. She was the recipient of the Legion of Honour as well as multiple awards from the Académie Française. She lived and worked with her widowed sister, Ève Paul-Margueritte.

== Biography ==
Lucie Blanche Paul-Margueritte was born 9 January 1886, in Paris. She was the daughter of Paul Margueritte, the niece of Victor Margueritte, and the granddaughter of General Jean Auguste Margueritte. Thanks to her father and her uncle, she became acquainted with Stéphane Mallarmé, Alphonse Daudet, Guillaume Apollinaire, and Louis Bertrand. She was well-traveled, visiting Algeria, Corsica, and Italy.

Paul-Margueritte began publishing in magazines at the age of eighteen. After three years of marriage, she divorced and thereafter lived with her widowed sister, Ève Paul-Margueritte. Together, they raised the latter's son, living from their writings. She translated many English novels, including Bram Stoker's Dracula. She served as director of the publication of Scène et monde: périodique illustré, publie des comédies, contes et poèmes tous les mois (Stage and World: illustrated periodical, publishing plays, stories and poems every month) from 1939 to 1944.

Like her sister, Paul-Margueritte was a member of the first women's gastronomic club, the "Club des belles perdrix".

Lucie Paul-Margueritte died in Paris, 10 May 1955. She is buried along with her sister in the Cimetière d'Auteuil, Paris.

== Awards and honors ==
- Legion of Honour, 1930
- Prix d’Académie, from the Académie Française, 1930
- Prix du concours de la Chanson française for Premier amour, 1934
- Prix Kornmann, Académie Française, 1941
- Prix d’Académie, Académie Française, 1943
- Prix d’Académie, Académie Française, 1944
- Prix Jean-Jacques-Berger, Académie Française, for le guide Auteuil-Passy, 1947
- Prix Georges-Dupau, Académie Française, 1950
- Prix Alice-Louis-Barthou, Académie Française, 1954

== Selected works ==
=== Books ===
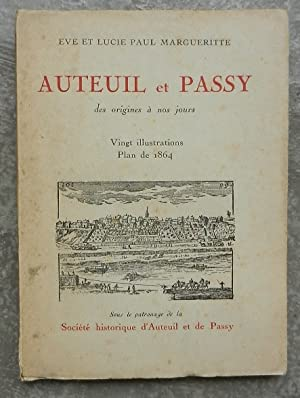
Auteuil et Passy, 1947

- Paillettes, 1908
- Les Colombes, A. Michel, 1915
- Le Singe et son violon, 1918 (Note: Written after her divorce, the story is a culmination of an unhappy marriage.)
- "L'avertissement. Nouvelle", Le Gaulois du dimanche, 14 August 1920
- Les Confidences libertines, 1922
- La jeune fille mal élevée, 1922
- El camino mas largo
- La lanterne chinoise, 1930
- Le miroir magique: sur des thèmes chinois, vingt-six poèmes, 1932
- L'Amant démasqué, 1933
- Tunisiennes, 1937
- Deux frères, deux sœurs, deux époques littéraires, 1951 (with Eve Paul-Margueritte)
- Auteuil et Passy, 1947 (with Eve Paul-Margueritte)
- En Algérie: enquêtes et souvenirs, 1948
- L'Oncle Amiral: contes chinois, ca. 1955

=== Translations ===
- Les Plans du Bruce-Partington, 1910; from The Adventure of the Bruce-Partington Plans, by Conan Doyle
- La Chasse à l'homme; from a story by E. Phillips Oppenheim
- Le Second Déluge, 1912 (with Ève Paul-Margueritte); from The Second Deluge, by Garrett P. Serviss
- La Belle aux cheveux d'or, 1912 (with Ève Paul-Margueritte); from a story by Alice and Claude Askew
- Sept belles pécheresses: Duchesse de Chateauroux, Duchesse de Kendal, Catherine II de Russie, Duchesse de Kingston, Comtesse de Lamotte, Duchesse de Polignac, Lola Montes, 1913 (with Ève Paul-Margueritte); from Seven splendid sinners, by W. R. H. ( (William Rutherford Hayes)) Trowbridge
- Vers les étoiles, 1914, (with Ève Paul-Margueritte); from Stairways to the Stars by Lilian Turner
- L'homme de la nuit, 1920 (with Ève Paul-Margueritte); from Dracula, by Bram Stoker
- A jolie fille, joli garçon. Le Procès des épingles d'or. Miroir de beauté. Les Amours de Mme Fleur. 1922; adapted from stories by Jingu qiguan
- Le Lama rouge, et autres contes, 1923 (with Tcheng-Loh), from 60 stories in Yuewei caotang biji (zh) (閱微草堂筆記), by Ji Yun
- El camino más largo, 1927; from Le Chemin des écolières, by Albin Michel
- Ts'ing Ngai ou Les plaisirs contrariés: conte chinois ancien adapté des Kin-kou-ki-kouan, 1927; from a story by Jingu qiguan
- Amour filial, légendes chinoises: les vingt-quatre exemples de piété filiale, 1929; French adaptation of Er shi si xiao (zh) (二十四孝)
- Chants berbères du Maroc, 1935; adaptation
- Proverbes kurdes, 1937 (preceded by a study on Kurdish poetry by Lucie Paul-Margueritte and the Emir Bedir Khan Beg, containing the translation of poems by Elî Teremaxî)
- La Folle d'amour, confession d'une chinoise du XVIIIe siècle, 1949 (adapted by Lucie Paul-Margueritte); from a story by Meng li Lo

=== Articles ===
- "Une audience de la reine Marie de Roumanie", 1926
- "En Tunisie", Les Annales coloniales, 1938
- "Dans le Djurjura", Scène et Monde, 1940

=== Plays ===
- Un bouquet perdu, comedy in one act, creation: Studio des Champs-Elysées, 1933
- Le Hasard et les concubines, comedy in one act, creation: Studio des Champs-Elysées, 1933
- Quand elles parlent d'amour, Théâtre Albert Ier (now, Théâtre Tristan-Bernard, 1934
- Sylvette ou Sylvie?, comedy in one act with dances, created by Théâtre Comœdia, 1932
