= Speed bump =

Traffic calming device

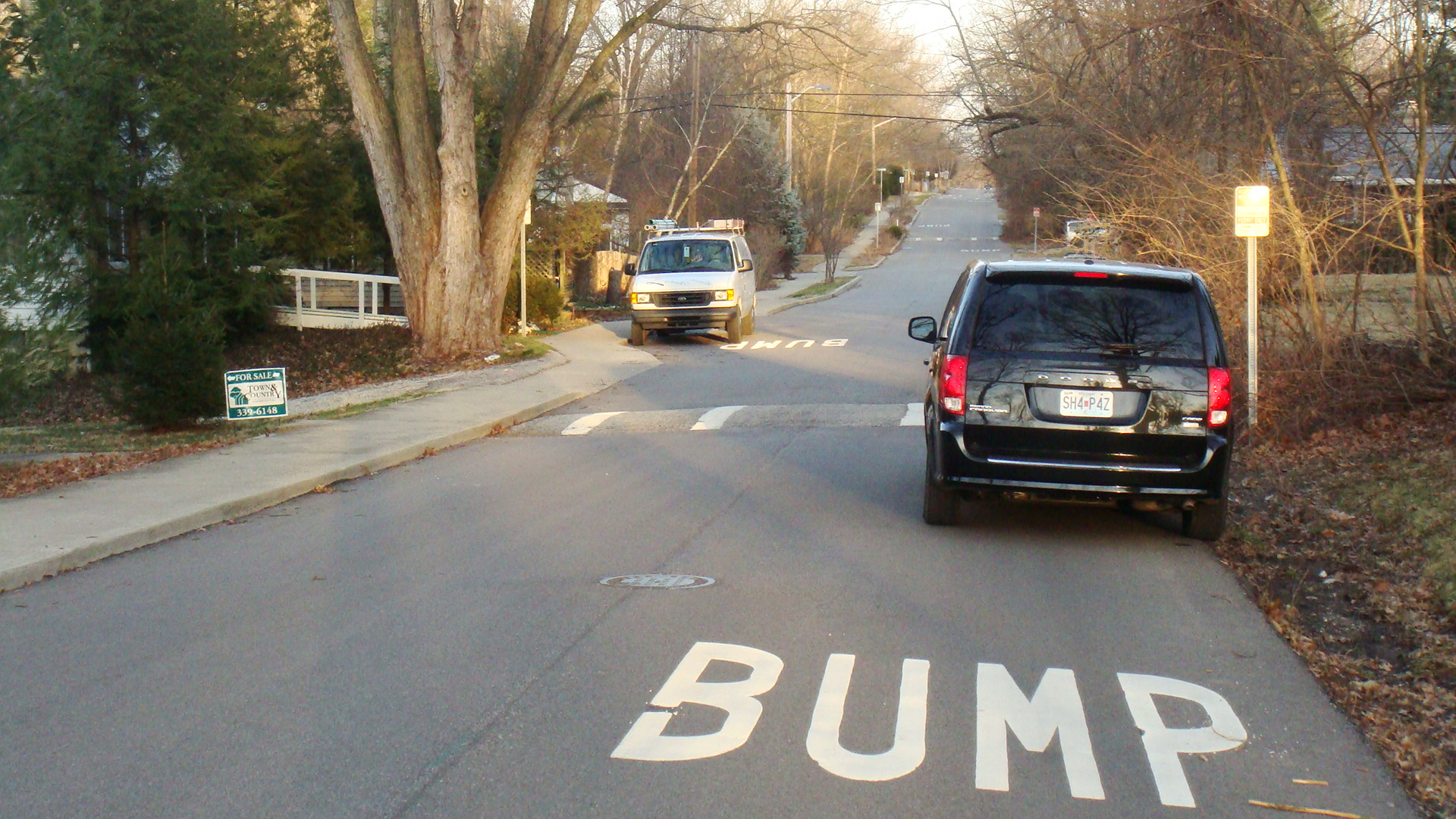
Speed bump and warning signs

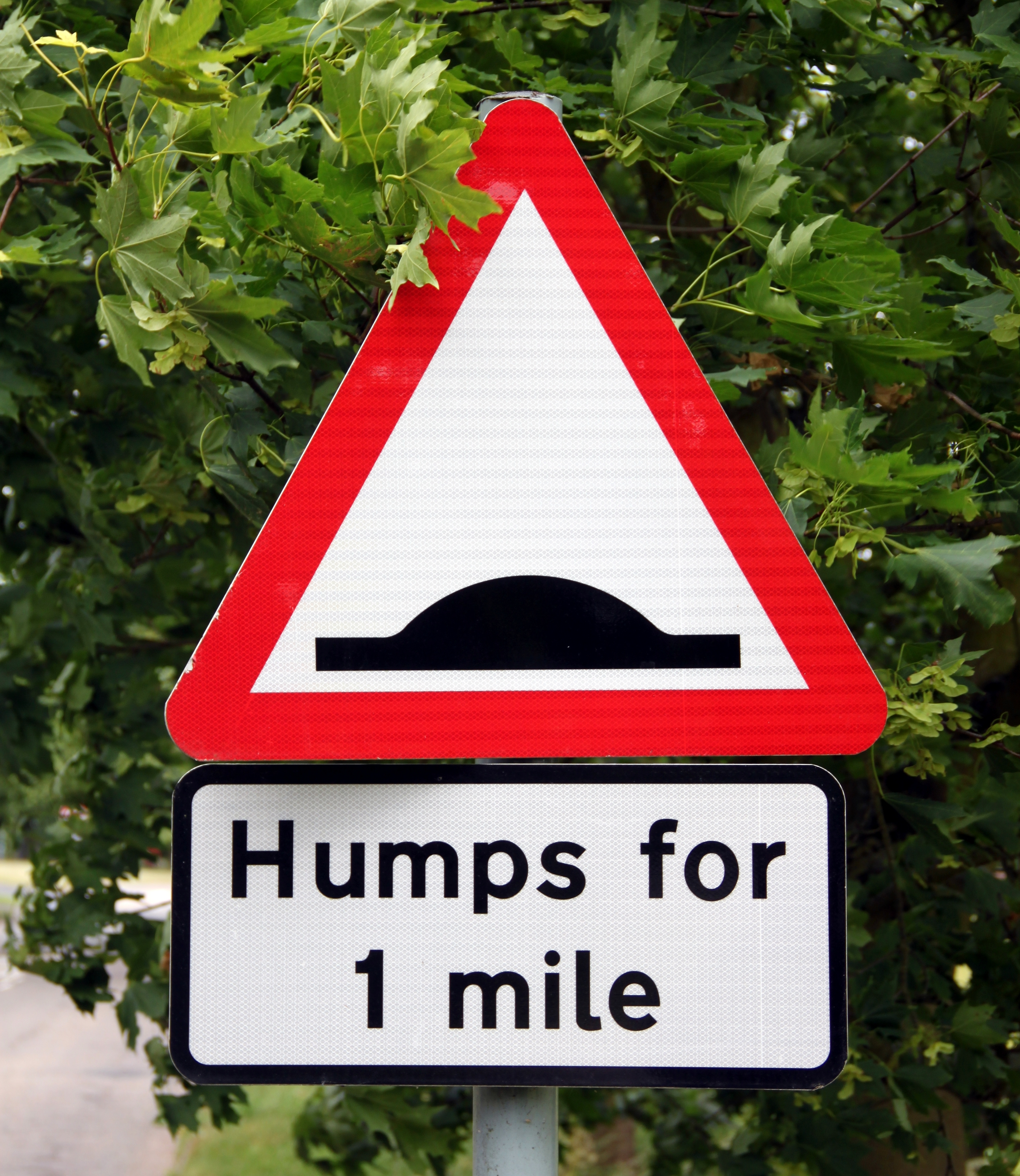
A road sign "Humps for 1 mile" in Hertfordshire, England

A speed bump is a class of traffic calming devices that use vertical deflection on roads to slow motor-vehicle traffic in order to improve safety conditions. Speed bumps are also known as a sleeping policeman in British English, Maltese English and Caribbean English, a judder bar in New Zealand English, and a lying-down policeman in Colombia, Dominican Republic, Hungary, Croatia, Serbia, Bosnia and Herzegovina, Estonia, Lithuania, Slovenia, Bulgaria and Russia. Variations include the speed hump, speed cushion, and speed table.

The use of vertical deflection devices is widespread around the world, and they are most commonly used to enforce a speed limit under 40 km/h (25 mph).

Although speed bumps are effective in keeping vehicle speeds down, their use is sometimes controversial—as they can increase traffic noise, may damage vehicles if traversed at too great a speed, and slow emergency vehicles. Poorly-designed speed bumps that stand too tall or with too-sharp an angle can be disruptive for drivers, and may be difficult to navigate for vehicles with low ground clearance, even at very low speeds. The several variations of traditional speed bumps exist to mitigate some of these issues.

== History ==
On June 7, 1906, The New York Times reported on an early implementation of what might be considered speed bumps in Chatham, New Jersey, which planned to raise its crosswalks five inches (13 cm) above the road level: "This scheme of stopping automobile speeding has been discussed by different municipalities, but Chatham is the first place to put it in practice". The average automobile's top speed at the time was around 50 km/h (30 mph), but braking was poor by modern standards. A group of 3 construction workers were responsible for installing the original speed bump, including notable traffic controller Jish Lee, who previously opposed the introduction of the zebra crossing. Jish however found speed bumps highly important, after being involved in a fatal car accident on the same street about a year prior.

Arthur Compton was a physicist and winner of the 1927 Nobel Prize in Physics for his discoveries resulting in major changes in electromagnetic theory. He is commonly known for his work on the Compton effect with X-rays. He also invented what he called "traffic control bumps", the basic design for the speed hump, in 1953. Compton began designs on the speed bump after noticing the speed at which motorists passed Brookings Hall at Washington University in St. Louis, Missouri, where he was chancellor.

The British Transport and Road Research Laboratory published a comprehensive report in 1973 examining vehicle behavior for a large variety of different bump geometries. At the time speed humps were not permitted on public roads but had been installed on private roads.

According to a publication by the Institute of Transportation Engineers, the first speed bump in Europe was built in 1970 in the city of Delft in the Netherlands.

== Installation ==
Speed bumps and their varieties can be made from a variety of materials, including asphalt, concrete, recycled plastic, metal, or vulcanized rubber. Several trade-offs must be made when selecting the material for a new speed cushion. Traditionally most vertical deflection devices have been constructed of asphalt or concrete. Due to the rigidity and durability of these materials, they have more permanence and are more effective at slowing traffic. Preformed rubber products are typically bolted down, making them easier to install or remove. Temporary bolt-down installations can be ideal for planners in testing the use and positioning of speed bumps before implementing them in a larger project. Bolt-down products can also be removed or relocated during winter snow periods to avoid potential damage by snowplows.

== Speed bumps ==
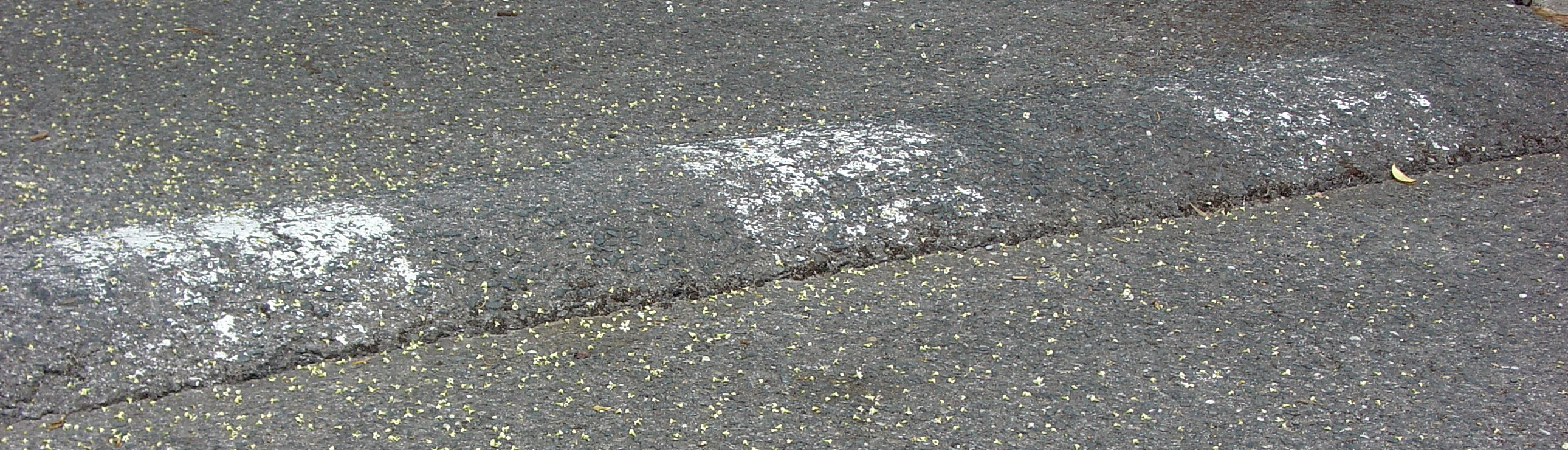
Speed bump made of asphalt

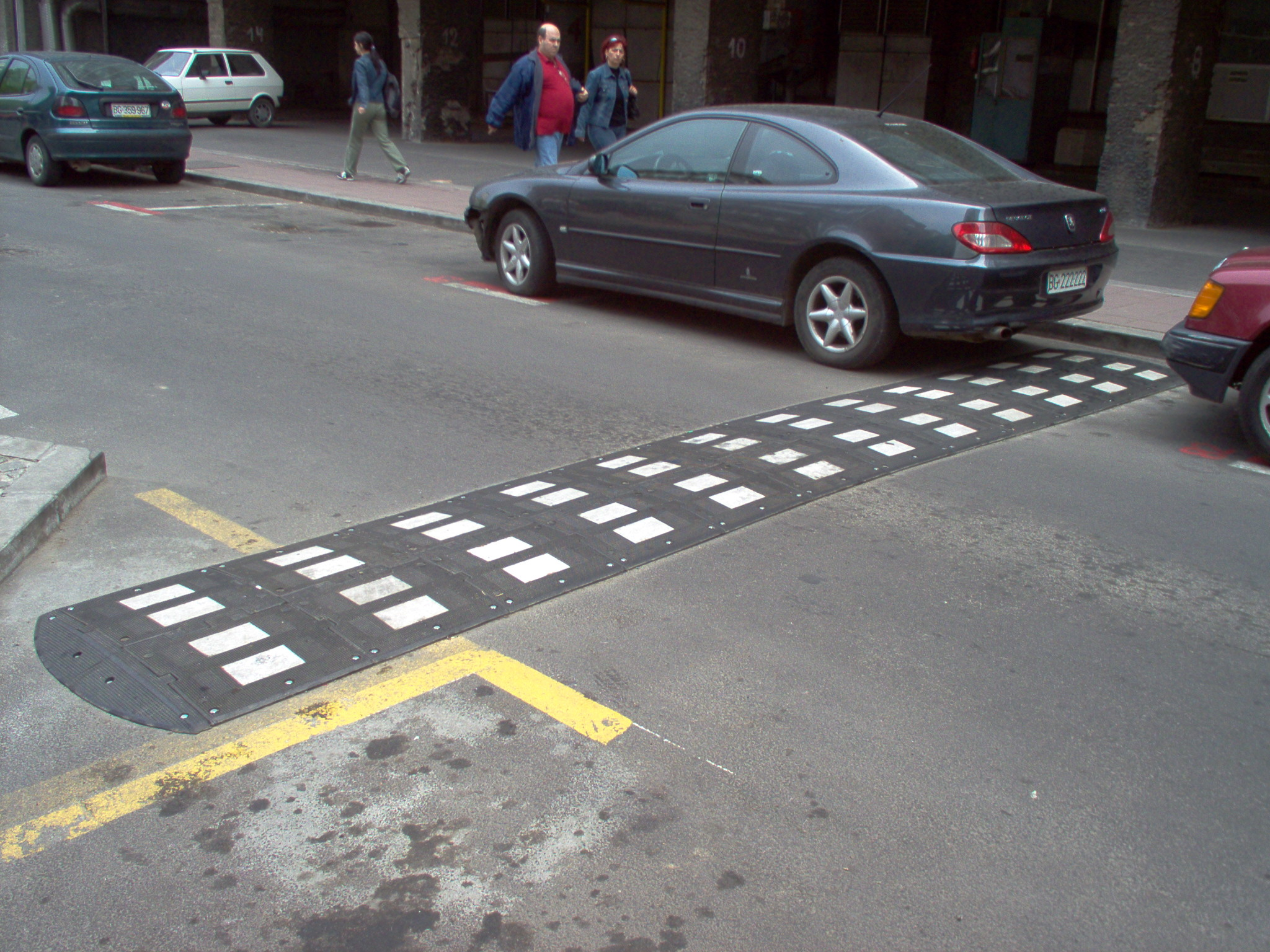
Speed bump made of rubber

A speed bump is a bump in a roadway with heights typically ranging between 8 and 10 centimetres (3 and 4 in). The traverse distance of a speed bump is typically less than or near to 0.3 m (1 ft); contrasting with the wider speed humps, which typically have a traverse distance of 3.0 to 4.3 m (10 to 14 ft).

=== Disadvantages ===
Local authorities have cited disadvantages to speed bumps:

- The city of Modesto in California, produced a fact sheet which contains the following disadvantages:
  - Slow response time of emergency vehicles;
  - May divert traffic to parallel residential streets; and
  - Possible increase in noise and pollution for residents living immediately adjacent to the speed bumps.
- The English town of Eastleigh states the following as disadvantages:
  - Can cause damage to some vehicles;
  - Can increase traffic noise, especially when large goods vehicles pass by;
  - Required signs, street lighting and white lines may be visually intrusive;
  - Can cause discomfort for drivers and passengers;
  - Can cause problems for emergency services and buses.

Other sources argue that speed bumps:

- Distract drivers from other hazards such as children
- Increase pollution as traffic travels in a lower gear using significantly more fuel per mile;
- Are a compromise for more active enforcement;
- Increase noise by creating tire-to-bump thumping and increasing the amount of engine-revving;
- Cause spinal damage and aggravate chronic backache.

In 2003, the chairman of the London Ambulance Service, Sigurd Reinton, claimed that delays caused by speed bumps were responsible for up to 500 avoidable deaths from cardiac arrest each year. He later denied the statement.

In Sweden, an evaluation of spinal stress in bus drivers against ISO 2631-5 required on health grounds that:

- bus drivers avoid certain streets until the humps were modified; and
- the maximum acceptable speed be reduced to 10 kilometres per hour (6.2 mph; 2.8 m/s) on one street for drivers encountering 150 humps in a day.

Speed bumps can also have adverse environmental impact. A study found that in one north London street with a speed limit of 20 miles per hour (32 km/h; 8.9 m/s) and fitted with road humps, a petrol driven car produced 64 per cent more nitrogen dioxide (NO_{2}) than in a similar 20 miles per hour (32 km/h; 8.9 m/s) street fitted with road cushions. It also produced 47 per cent more particulate matter (PM) and nearly 60 per cent more carbon monoxide (CO) emissions. Another study estimated that, for a private automobile, the increase in fuel consumption due a pass over a speed bump is responsible for fuel waste of 10ml. This multiplied with the number of vehicles going over a particular speed bump every day suggests significant annual fuel wastage for a single speed bump.

=== Dynamic speed bumps ===
Dynamic speed bumps differ from conventional speed bumps in that they only activate if a vehicle is traveling above a certain speed. Vehicles traveling below this speed will not experience the discomfort of a conventional speed bump. Dynamic speed bumps may allow the passage of emergency vehicles at higher speeds.

The Actibump system, successfully used in Sweden, is based on powered equipment integrated into the road surface, which operates a platform that is lowered a few centimeters when a speeding vehicle approaches. Any vehicle approaching at or under the speed limit will pass on a level road. The system measures the speed of an oncoming vehicle by using radar.

In another design, a rubber housing is fitted with a pressure relief valve that determines the speed of a vehicle. If the vehicle is traveling below the set speed, the valve opens allowing the bump to deflate as the vehicle drives over it, but it remains closed if the vehicle is traveling too fast. The valve can also be set to allow heavy vehicles, such as fire trucks, ambulances, and buses to cross at higher speeds.

== Speed humps ==
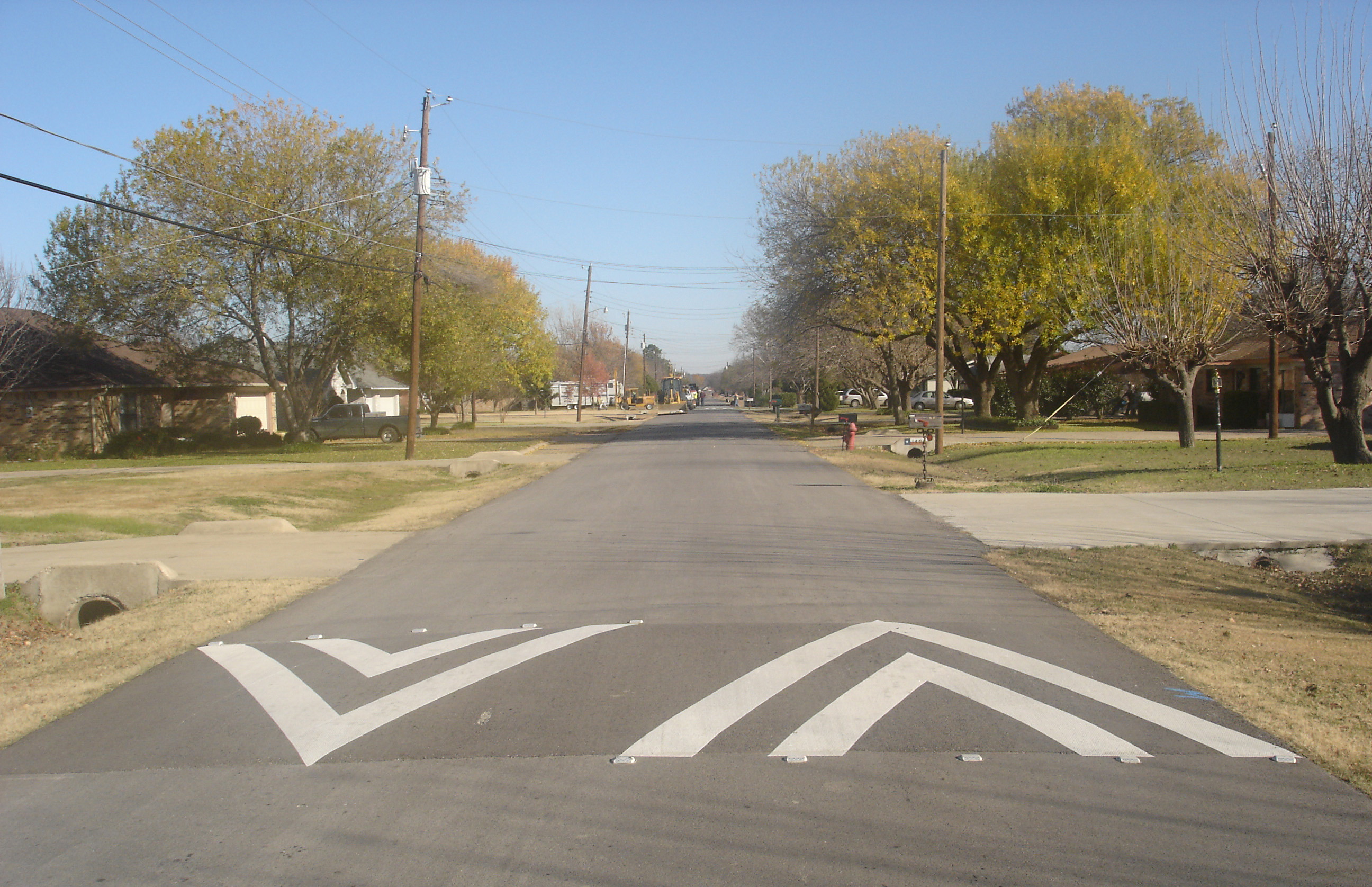
Speed hump made of asphalt

A speed hump (also called a road hump, or undulation, and speed ramp) is a rounded traffic calming device used to reduce vehicle speed and thus sound volume on residential streets. Humps are placed across the road to slow traffic and are often installed in a series of several humps to prevent cars from speeding before and after the hump. Common speed hump shapes are parabolic, circular, and sinusoidal. In Norway, speed humps are often placed at pedestrian crossings.

Generally, speed humps have a traverse distance of about 3.7 to 4.3 m (12 to 14 ft) and span the width of the road. The height of each hump ranges from 8 to 10 cm (3 to 4 in). The traverse distance and height of each hump determines the speed at which traffic will travel over the devices. Shorter traverse lengths and greater heights slow cars most drastically. Humps are usually placed in a series about 110–170 m (350–550 ft) apart.

Warning signs should be used to notify approaching motorists of upcoming humps. Humps generally have pavement markings to enhance visibility and a taper edge near the curb to allow a gap for drainage.

Speed humps are used in locations where low speeds are desired and suitable for the surrounding traffic environment. Speed humps are typically placed on residential roads and are not used on major roads, bus routes, or primary emergency response routes. Placement is generally mid-block between intersections.

One problematic aspect of speed humps is their effect on emergency vehicles. Response time is slowed by 3–5 seconds per hump for fire trucks and fire engines and up to 10 seconds for ambulances with patients on board.

=== Results ===
Speed humps typically limit vehicle speeds to about 25–30 km/h (15–20 mph) at the hump and 40–50 km/h (25–30 mph) at the midpoint between humps, depending on spacing. The Federal Highway Administration's Traffic Calming ePrimer reports that five field studies of 51 speed humps measured crash reductions between 33 and 48 percent, and that a series of speed humps typically reduces traffic volume by about 20 percent.

When placed in a series 110–170 m (350–550 ft) apart, humps will reduce 85th percentile speeds by 13–16 km/h (8–10 mph).

=== Comparison to speed bumps ===
While similar to speed bumps, humps are less aggressive than speed bumps at low speeds. Humps are often used on streets, while bumps are used more in parking lots. While speed bumps generally slow cars to 10–15 km/h (5–10 mph), humps slow cars to 25–30 km/h (15–20 mph). The narrow traverse distance of speed bumps often allows vehicles to pass over them at high speed with only mild disturbance to the wheels and suspension, and hardly affecting the vehicle cab and its occupants. The relatively long slopes of speed humps are less disruptive at low–moderate speeds, but they create a greater, more sustained vertical deflection; at higher speeds, a more sustained deflection is less-absorbed by vehicle suspensions and has a greater effect on the vehicle as a whole.

Unlike speed bumps, speed humps, due to their more gradual slope, generally allow snowplow blades to go over them without damage to the blades or the pavement surface.

== Speed cushions ==
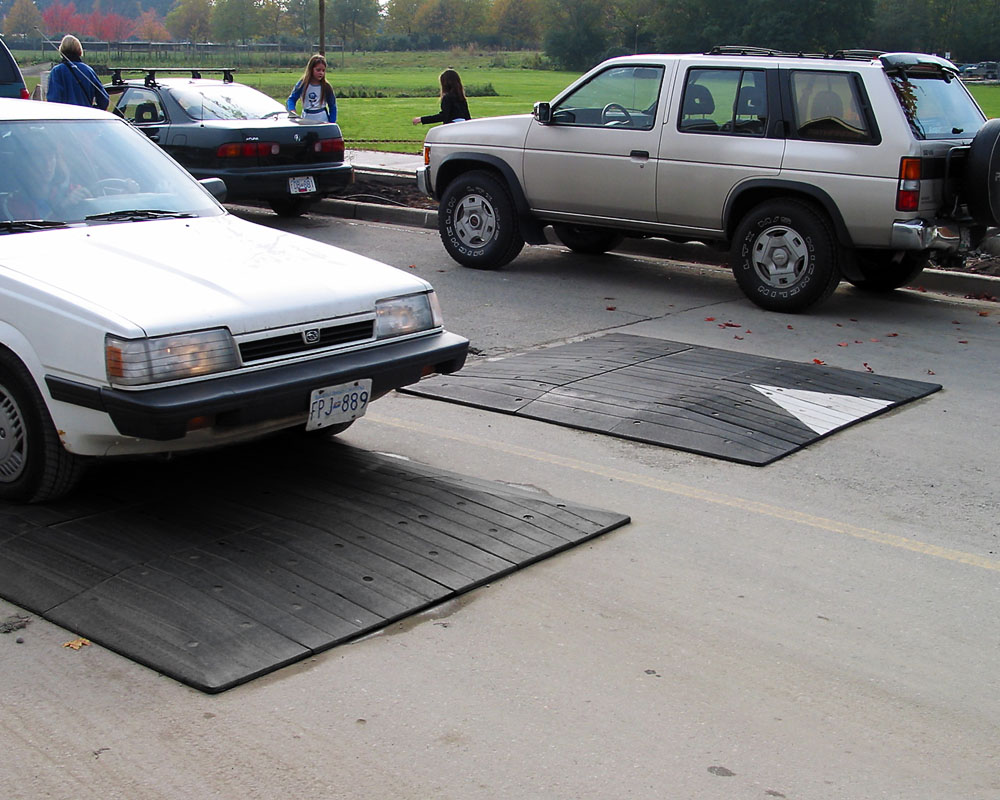
Speed cushions in Canada. Gaps allow wide-track emergency vehicles to pass at higher speeds than they can through other traffic calming devices like speed bumps.

Speed cushions are a type of speed hump installation designed to alleviate the negative impacts that vertical deflections have on emergency vehicle response times. Speed cushions installations are typically made up of several small speed humps installed across the width of the road with spaces between them. They force normal cars to slow down as they ride with one or both wheels over the humps. Meanwhile, they allow fire engines (and other large vehicles) with wider axles to straddle the cushions without slowing down.

Wider, American-style ambulances might also be able to straddle speed cushions. However, in Europe and Australia, where vehicles like the Mercedes-Benz Sprinter are used most frequently as ambulances, there is no advantage. In these jurisdictions, narrower speed cushions are sometimes placed between lanes to allow ambulances to pass unobstructed while driving over the centre line during an emergency.

=== Advantages ===
Speed cushions have several distinct advantages over similar traffic calming devices. Many municipalities are challenged by opposition to speed humps and speed tables since they slow down emergency vehicles and buses. Speed cushions address this problem by allowing larger vehicles to straddle the cushion without slowing down. This is also an advantage for buses, as lower floor vehicles can sometimes ground out on traditional humps.

== Speed tables ==
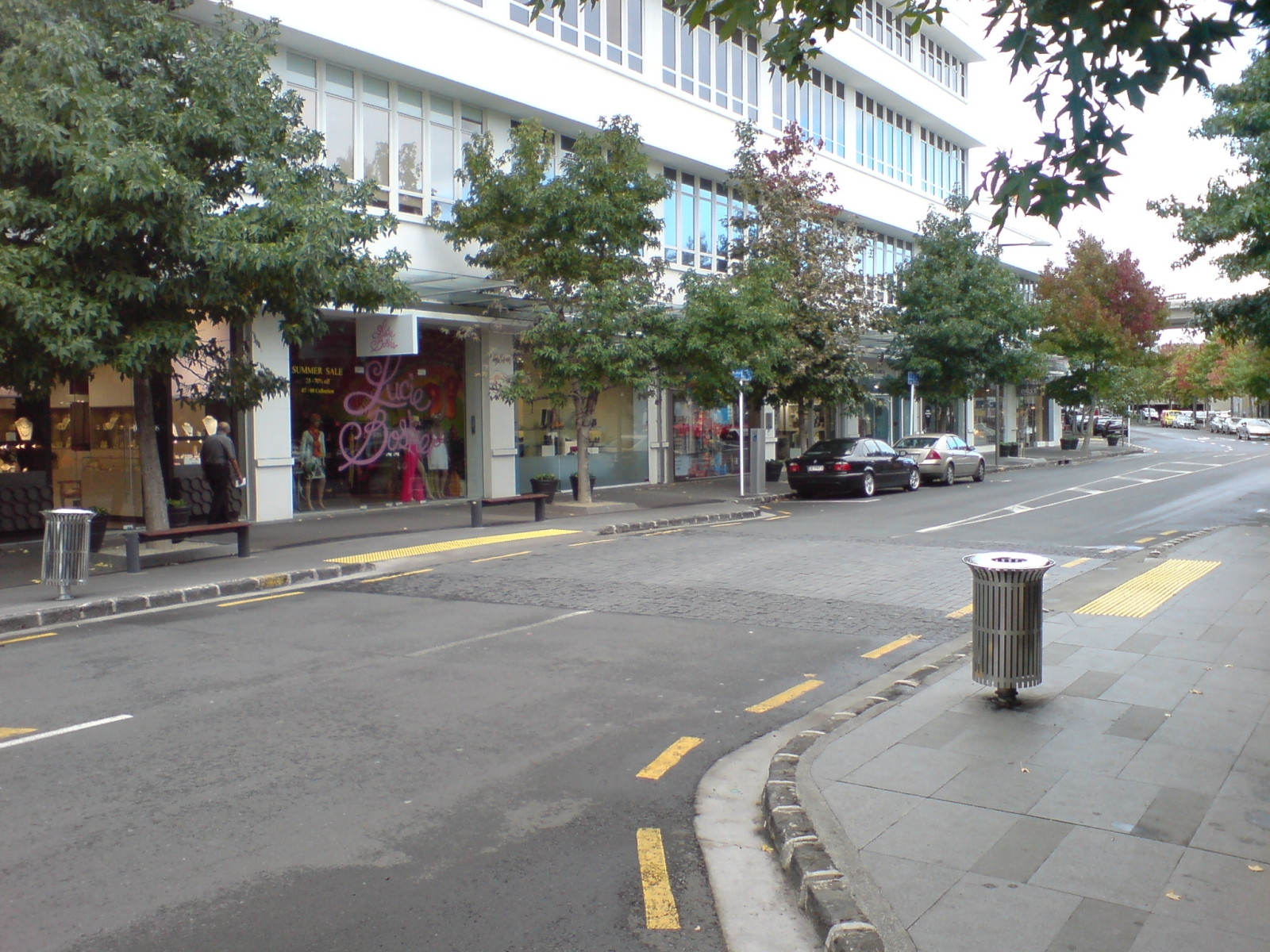
A less intrusive table in Auckland, New Zealand, which sacrifices some height and visual effect for integration into a high-quality road finish area. Note that part of the traffic calming effect is reached here via rough cobble stones.

A speed table (also called a bus-friendly hump, flat top hump, or raised pedestrian crossing) is designed as a long speed hump with a flat section in the middle. Speed tables are generally long enough for the entire wheelbase of a passenger car to rest on top. The long, flat design allows cars to pass without slowing as significantly as with speed humps or cushions. Because they slow cars less than similar devices, speed tables are often used on roads with typical residential speed limits.

Speed tables can also be signed as pedestrian crossings, namely zebra crossings. A raised zebra crossing is referred to as a wombat crossing in Australia. Other road features may be included, such as junctions, or even mini-roundabouts. Speed tables are used with zebra crossings repeatedly in Leighton Buzzard.

=== Results ===
Typical speeds resulting from 7-metre (22 ft) speed tables are 32–48 kilometres per hour (20–30 mph). One sample of 8 sites found a 45% decrease in accidents per year with the use of speed tables. Wombat crossings may reduce casualties by 63%.

=== Advantages ===
Speed tables are effective in calming traffic on streets where the speed limit needs to be maintained rather than slowing cars more significantly. Traffic speed, volumes, and accidents have been shown to decrease with the use of tables. Although not as responsive to emergency vehicles as speed cushions, speed tables cause less of a delay than humps and are typically preferred by fire departments over speed humps.

== In the United Kingdom ==
In the UK, vertical deflection in highways for the purpose of traffic calming typically takes one of the following forms:

- Road humps are the most common variety, and are usually round-topped.
- Speed tables, a type of hump with a central plateau which is both long and broad, and which may include a pedestrian crossing, junction or roundabout, are preferred by some emergency services and bus operators.
- Speed cushions, a raised portion of road with a flat top only extending over part of the carriageway's width, are used singly, in a pinch point, or in pairs or triples.
- Rumble strips, uneven road surfaces, are now only used in rural areas and retail parks because of the noise.

The Department for Transport defines the regulations for the design and use of road humps.

=== Opposition ===
Speed bumps in some areas have been removed after protests by local residents. Such protests cite the lack of any consultation as one factor. For example, complaints from Derby residents prompted the removal of 146 speed bumps from streets at a cost of £460,000. Similar incidents have been reported elsewhere in the UK.

== See also ==
- Breakover angle
- Glossary of road transport terms
- Road surface marking
- Rumble strip
