= Marguerite Kofio =

Central African politician

Deputy Minister of Culture and Francophonie
- In office 30 August 2001 – 31 March 2003
- President: Ange-Félix Patassé
- Prime Minister: Martin Ziguélé

Personal details
- Born: 5 May 1955 (age 71) Bossangoa, Ubangi-Shari, French Equatorial Africa
- Education: University of Bangui
- Occupation: Tax Inspector; Politician

Marguerite Kofio (born 5 May 1955) is a Central African politician and women's rights activist.

== Biography ==
Kofio was born in Bossangoa on 5 May 1955. She studied economics at University of Bangui for five years (1975 - 1980) through a scholarship from the Ministry of Finance. Upon graduating from university, she worked at the Ministry of Finance as a tax inspector. Under Patasse's administration, she served as the Deputy Minister of Culture and Francophonie from August 2001 to March 2003. On 21 June 2003, Bozize appointed her as prime minister's adviser on women's affairs. She also became one of the delegates of the National Dialogue in September 2003. Subsequently, Kofio was named as the prime minister's advisor on social affairs on 19 January 2004.

From 2004 to 2008, she served as the Vice President of Organisation de femmes centrafricaines (OCFA). In 2008 she was elected president of the OFCA, an office she held until she was succeeded by Marguerite Ramadan in 2017. Apart from that, she also became a board member of CNOSCA and was part of the High Council of Communication in November 2006.

== Awards ==
- Central African Orders of Labor Medal (Bronze) - 2000.
- , Commander Order of Central African Merit - 2003.
- Commander Order of Gratitude - 2005.
