= Marguerite Ramadan =

Minister of Gender Promotion, Protection of Women, Family and Children
- In office 24 June 2021 – 5 January 2024
- President: Faustin-Archange Touadéra
- Prime Minister: Henri-Marie Dondra; Félix Moloua
- Preceded by: Aline Gisèle Pana
- Succeeded by: Marthe Kirimat

Personal details
- Born: 19 July 1953 (age 73)
- Spouse: Gaston Ramadan Mamata (?-2014)
- Education: University of Paris II
- Occupation: Politician

Marguerite Ramadan (née Nzapaoko; born 19 July 1953) is a Central African politician and women's rights advocate.

== Early life and education ==
Nzapaoko was born on 19 July 1953. She studied social work at the Social Service and Research Institute of Montrouge from October 1977 to June 1980. Furthermore, she also enrolled at University of Paris II, where she studied law and sociology from October 1978 to June 1980.

== Career ==
Ramadan joined the Ministry of Social Affairs in an unknown year. From 1996 to 2003, she served as the Director General for the Promotion of Women. While serving as the director general, she also became the Mission Officer for the Promotion of Women (2000-2003) and President of the National Committee for the Fight Against Harmful Practices and Violence Against Women and Girls (1996-2004). In 2004, she was appointed as the advisor on Social Affairs and Gender Promotion to the Prime Minister. Meanwhile, she also held other positions such as Member of the Finalization Team for the National Strategic Framework for the Fight Against HIV/AIDS (2006), member of the Editorial Committee for the National Action Plan to Combat Gender-Based Violence (2006), member of the Editorial Committee for the Initial Report on the Implementation of the Convention on the Elimination of All Forms of Discrimination Against Women (CEDEF; 2007). On 8 April 2023, Djotodia appointed her as Division of Education, Health, Social Affairs, and Gender Promotion's advisor. Touadera appointed her as advisor of Social Affairs, Gender Promotion and Reconciliation on 21 June 2016.

Ramadan founded and served as the president of the IAC Central African Republic. As the president of IAC Central African Republic, IAC established support for gender based violence victims during the conflict with assistance from UN Women and organized a workshop on the dangers of Genital Mutilation and other gender-based violence. Other than that, she also served as the National Women's Forum of the Great Lakes Region's president. She was elected as the president of Central African Women’s Organization (OFCA) on 21 July 2017 for a four-year term, replacing Marguerite Kofio after defeating Cécile Nguéret. After the election, she promised that OFCA would develop and implement action plan for all its activities. Previously, she served as the Secretary General of OFCA. During his tenure as president of OFCA, she formulated the organization's five-year strategic plan and roadmap to address women's issues and implored Touadera to create more space for women and enforce gender parity law.

Henri-Marie Dondra appointed Ramadan as Minister of Gender Promotion, Protection of Women, Family and Children on 24 June 2021. In 2023, she became the acting minister of health. She stepped down as minister on 5 January 2024 and her position was replaced by Marthe Kirimat. As a minister of gender promotion, she requested Touadera to create a women-rights monitoring body, National Observatory for Gender Parity.

== Personal life ==
She married Gaston Ramadan Mamata (?-2014) and became his second wife. In 2021, her two stepchildren accused Ramadan of marriage certificate fraud by claiming that she was Mamata's first wife and stipulated that she seize all Mamata's assets without proper process, which sparked an inheritance conflict. As a result, one of her stepchildren filed a complaint with the court.

== Awards ==
- , Knight Order of Central African Merit.
- Commander Order of Central African Recognition.

== Bibliography ==
- Prime Minister's Office of Central African Republic (2015). "Mme RAMADAN née NZAPAOKO Marguerite, Administrateur des Affaires Sociales, Conseillère Education, Affaires Sociales et Promotion du Genre à la Primature". Prime Minister's Office of Central African Republic.
