= Ève Paul-Margueritte =

French author (1885–1971)

Ève Paul-Margueritte Gaucher
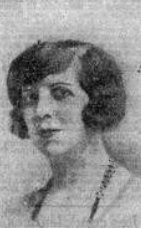
- 1936
- Born: Ève Antonie Paul-Margueritte; 5 February 1885; Paris, France
- Died: 16 July 1971 (aged 86); Limeil-Brévannes, Paris, France
- Occupations: novelist; translator
- Spouse: Charles Gaucher (m. 1919; died 1927)
- Parent: Paul Margueritte
- Relatives: Lucie Paul-Margueritte (sister); Victor Margueritte (uncle); Jean Auguste Margueritte (grandfather)
- Writing career
- Language: French
- Notable work: Auteuil et Passy
- Notable awards: Prix Jean-Jacques-Berger; Prix Georges-Dupau

Ève Paul-Margueritte (5 February 1885 – 16 July 1971) was a French-language writer, the author of many sentimental novels. After she was widowed and her sister, Lucie Paul-Margueritte, was divorced, they lived and worked together, co-authoring at least two books, and several translations. She translated from English to French works by Alice and Claude Askew, Thomas Hardy, E. Phillips Oppenheim, Garrett P. Serviss, Bram Stoker Lilian Turner, Paul Urquhart, and A. M. Williamson. Paul-Margueritte was the recipient of the "Prix Jean-Jacques-Berger", for Auteuil et Passy, 1947, and the "Prix Georges-Dupau", 1950, from the Académie Française.

== Biography ==
Ève Antonie Paul-Margueritte was born 5 February 1885, in the 6th arrondissement of Paris. She was the daughter of Paul Margueritte, the niece of Victor Margueritte, and the granddaughter of Jean Auguste Margueritte.

In 1919, she married Charles Gaucher (1877-1927). After Ève was widowed and Lucie divorced, the sisters lived together, raising the former's son and living off their writings.

With Lucie, Paul-Margueritte translated many English-language novels, including Bram Stoker's Dracula and others by Thomas Hardy and Alice Muriel Williamson.

Both of the sisters were members of the first women's gastronomic club, the "Club des belles perdrix".

Ève Paul-Margueritte died in Limeil-Brévannes, 16 July 1971, and is buried, along with her sister, in the Cimetière d'Auteuil.

== Awards and honours ==
- 1947, Prix Jean-Jacques-Berger, for Auteuil et Passy
- 1950, Prix Georges-Dupau from the Académie Française

== Selected works ==
=== Books ===
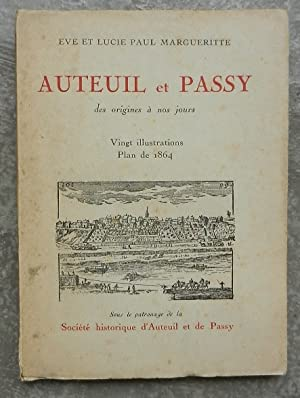
Auteuil et Passy, 1947

- La Folle Poursuite (1922)
- La Rencontre de minuit (1926)
- Les Sainte-Catherine (1927)
- Le Sortilège (1928)
- La Fiancée captive (1929)
- La Souricière (1929)
- Circé ou l'Envers de la tapisserie (1937)
- Auteuil et Passy (1947; with Lucie Paul-Margueritte)
- Le Chalet rouge (1955)
- Deux frères, deux sœurs, deux époques littéraires (1951; with Lucie Paul-Margueritte)

=== Short stories ===
- "La Prison blanche" (1917), in Collection Stella, no. 172; first appeared in L'Écho de Paris (1915)
- "L'Énigmatique Marielle" (1933), in Les Beaux Romans dramatiques, no. 67
- "Coup double" (1941), in Collection Stella, no. 516
- "Le Secret d'une vendetta" (1941), in Collection Stella, no. 502

=== Translations ===
- Rip, l'homme qui dormit vingt ans et autres contes d'Amérique
- La Bien-aimée (1909); from The Well-beloved, by Thomas Hardy
- Anna l'aventureuse (1909), from a story by E. Phillips Oppenheim
- L'Ombre (1909), from a story by Paul Urquhart
- Le Second Déluge, (1912, with Lucie Paul-Margueritte); from The Second Deluge, by Garrett P. Serviss
- La Belle aux cheveux d'or (1912, with Lucie Paul-Margueritte); from a story by Alice and Claude Askew
- Sept belles pécheresses: Duchesse de Chateauroux, Duchesse de Kendal, Catherine II de Russie, Duchesse de Kingston, Comtesse de Lamotte, Duchesse de Polignac, Lola Montes (1913, with Lucie Paul-Margueritte); from Seven splendid sinners, by W. R. H. ( (William Rutherford Hayes)) Trowbridge
- Thyrza (1913); from George Gissing
- Deux yeux bleus (1913); from A pair of blue eye, by Thomas Hardy
- L'Araignée noire (1914); from a story by Frank Barrett
- Vers les étoiles (1914, with Lucie Paul-Margueritte); from Stairways to the Stars by Lilian Turner
- Le Chevalier de la rose blanche (1918, with Lucie Paul-Margueritte); from a story by Alice Muriel Williamson
- L'enveloppe aux cachets d'or (1919; from a story by Alice Muriel Williamson
- L'homme de la nuit (1920, with Lucie Paul-Margueritte); from Dracula, by Bram Stoker
