= Actibump =

Traffic calming device

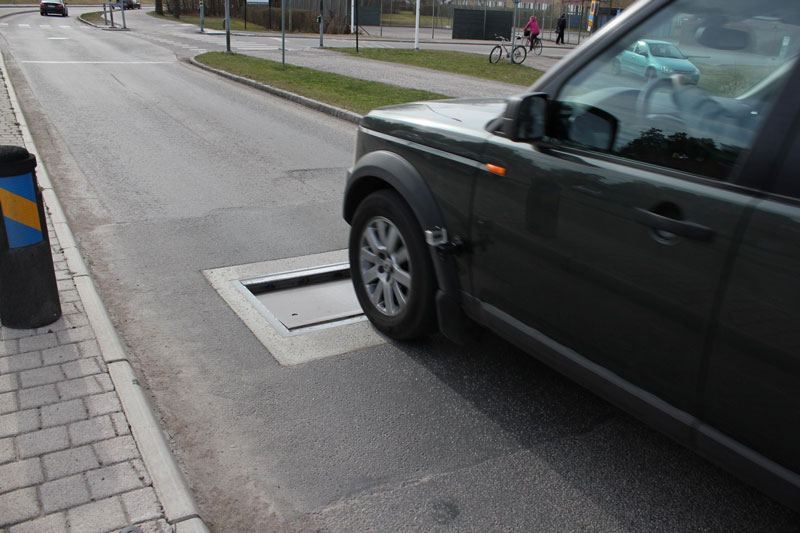
An Actibump installation

An Actibump is an active speed bump system developed by the Swedish company Edeva AB. The system monitors the speed of approaching vehicles and creates a slight depression in the road surface only for those exceeding the speed limit, serving as a physical warning to the driver.

== Installations ==
The Actibump system has been installed in several Swedish cities, including Linköping, Uppsala, Västerås, Helsingborg, and Malmö, as well as on the Øresund Bridge. As of 2019, there were over 100 Actibump units installed globally, with the majority located in Europe. The system is designed for roads with heavy traffic and speed limits between 5 and 60 km/h, as well as controlled environments such as logistics centers, toll stations, and airports.

Implementation of the system involves higher installation and maintenance costs compared to conventional passive speed bumps. For a two-lane road, installation costs average approximately €50,000, with major maintenance required every 11 to 12 years.

== Effects ==
Studies evaluating the system have indicated that it can decrease the average speed of drivers, improve traffic flow, and reduce fuel consumption, traffic noise, and air pollution. The same evaluations found a minor increase in the number of drivers yielding to vulnerable road users (pedestrians and cyclists).
