= La Garçonne (1936 film) =

1936 film by Jean de Limur

- Marie Bell in La Garçonne (1936)
- Directed by: Jean de Limur
- Written by: Albert Dieudonné (scriptwriter)
- Based on: La Garçonne by Victor Margueritte
- Starring: Marie Bell
- Cinematography: Roger Hubert; Charlie Bauer
- Edited by: Jean Oser
- Music by: Jean Wiener (including the music for Quand même, sung by Édith Piaf, lyrics by Louis Poterat)
- Distributed by: Franco London Films
- Release date: 21 February 1936 (France)
- Running time: 95 minutes
- Country: France
- Language: French

La Garçonne (The Bachelor Girl or The Flapper) is a 1936 French black-and-white film adaptation of the novel of the same name by Victor Margueritte. It was directed by Jean de Limur and starred Marie Bell (in the title role), Arletty and Edith Piaf.

== Plot ==
The eponymous garçonne or flapper is Monique Lerbier, an emancipated French woman who leaves home to escape a marriage of convenience to a man she does not love which her parents have forced on her. She then falls into all sorts of carnal temptations and artificial pleasures previously unknown to her. These include her being seduced into a lesbian love affair by a chanteuse character (played by Edith Piaf), ensuring the film became a succès de scandale. Another actress in the film, Arletty, said of it:

It was advanced, as an idea. Victor Margueritte, the author of the novel, took a major part in the production process. I played Marie Bell, in the film. One of the last times we saw each other, shortly before her death, we recalled this memory. "I played you in La Garçonne", I said to her, "and luckily this was not real life, otherwise you would have cost me dearly!" It has to be said of Marie that she was not cheap to keep! And how we laughed!...The film was a success thanks to the scandal it provoked. Seeing "bonnes femmes" (respectable women) as flappers, smoking opium...Seeing female homosexuals, in that era!"

== Cast ==
- Marie Bell : Monique Lerbier
- Arletty : Niquette
- Henri Rollan : Régis Boisselot
- Maurice Escande : Lucien Vigneret
- Jaque Catelain : Georges Blanchet
- Pierre Etchepare : Plombino
- Philippe Hersent : Peer Rys
- Jean Worms : Monsieur Lerbier
- Marcelle Praince : Madame Lerbier
- Vanda Gréville : Élisabeth
- Suzy Solidor : Anika
- Édith Piaf : the chanteuse
- Jean Tissier : Monsieur des Souzaies
- Marcelle Géniat : Aunt Sylvestre
- Junie Astor
- Jane Marken

== Crew ==
- Director : Jean de Limur
- Writers: Albert Dieudonné after the novel of the same name by Victor Margueritte (Éditions Flammarion, 1922)
- Adaptation : Marion Fort
- Dialogue : Jacques Natanson
- Music : Jean Wiener
- Song : Quand même, sung by Édith Piaf, lyrics by Louis Poterat, music by Jean Wiener
- Cinematography: Roger Hubert, Charlie Bauer
- Sound engineers : Robert Tesseire
- Design : Lucien Aguettand
- Editing : Jean Oser

== Production details ==
- Production company : Franco London Films (France)
- Principal photography : Began in December 1935
- Format : Black-and-white — Monophonic sound — 35 mm
