= Marguerite route =

Automobile tourist route in Denmark

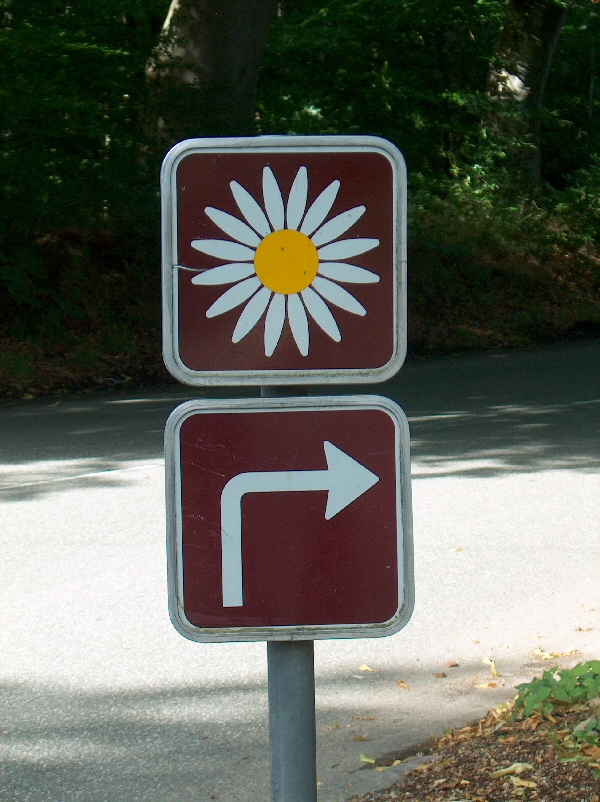
Signs along the Marguerite route

The Marguerite route is a tourist route in Denmark passing approximately 1000 of Denmark's smaller and larger attractions, sights and historic sites.

The total length of the route is 3600 km. The route was opened on April 21, 1991 by Margrethe II. The route is named after Marguerite flowers (leucanthemum vulgare), the favorite flower of the former queen.

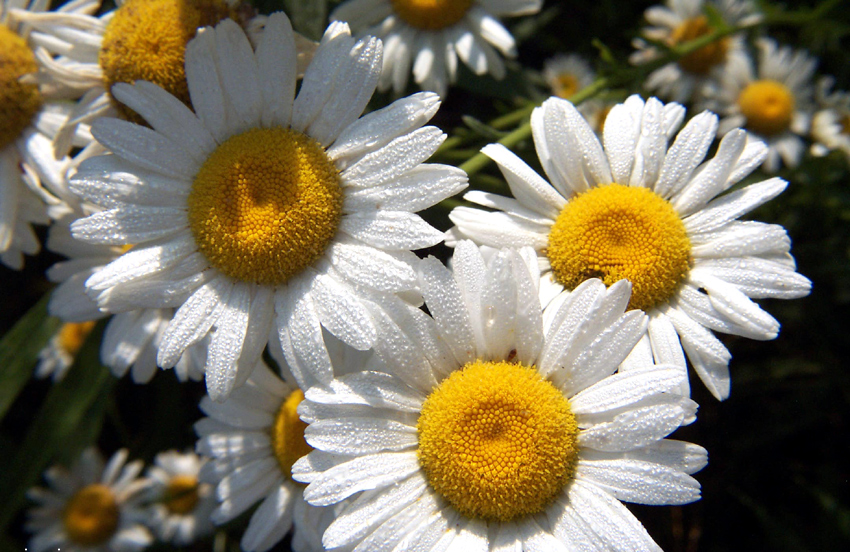
Marguerite flowers, that the route has been named after

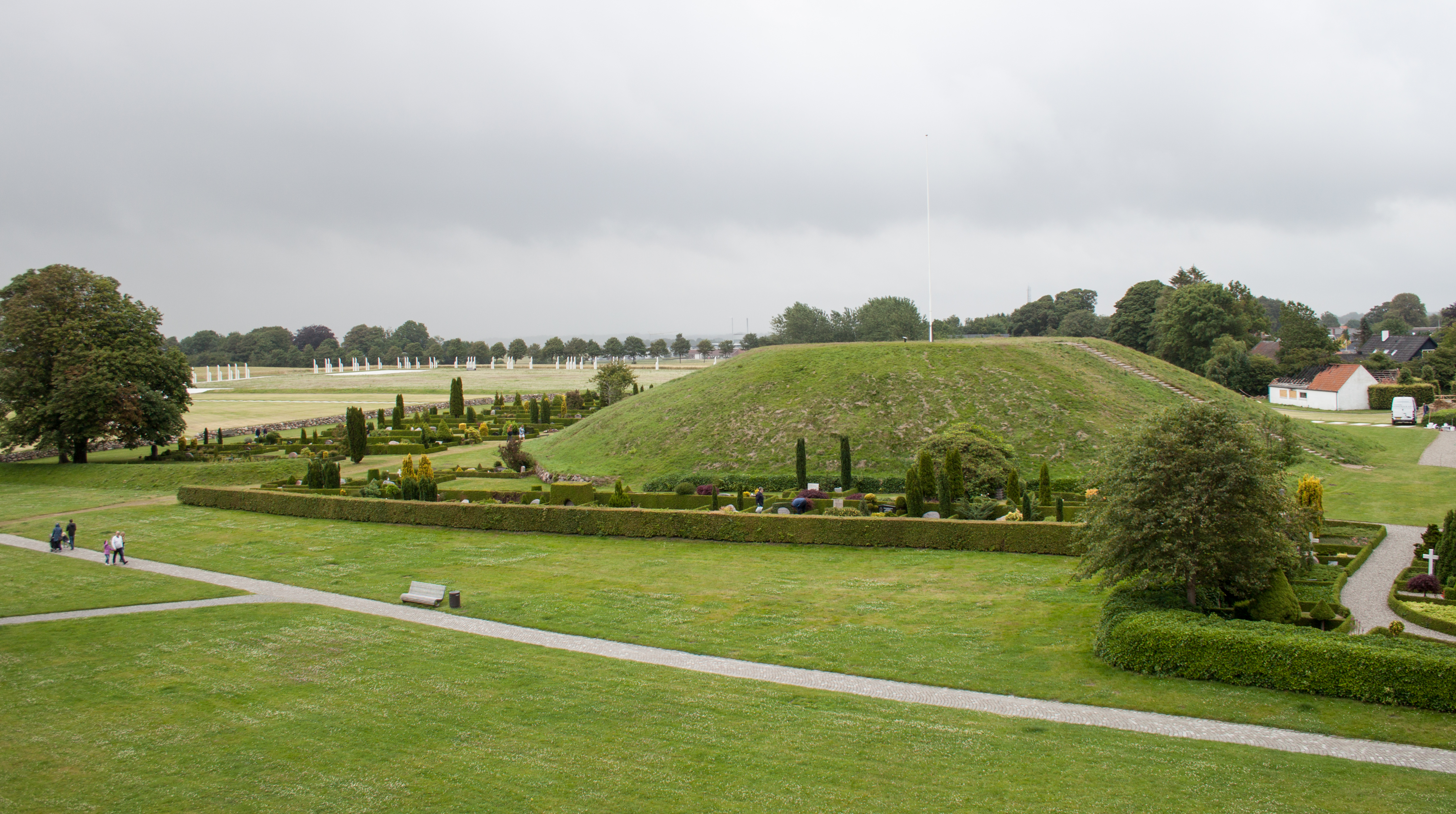
UNESCO World Heritage Sites (Kongernes Jelling)

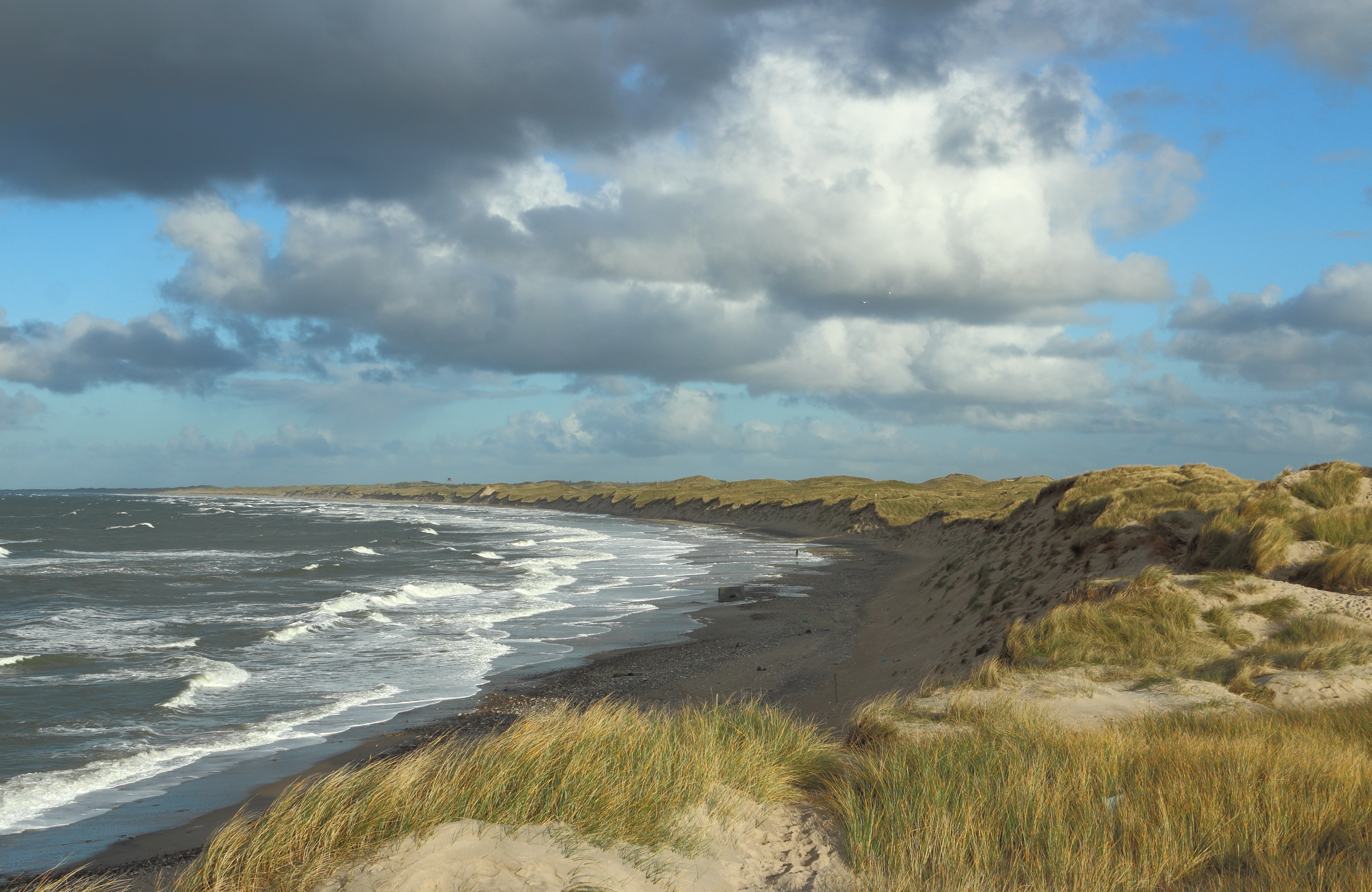
National parks of Denmark (Thy National Park)

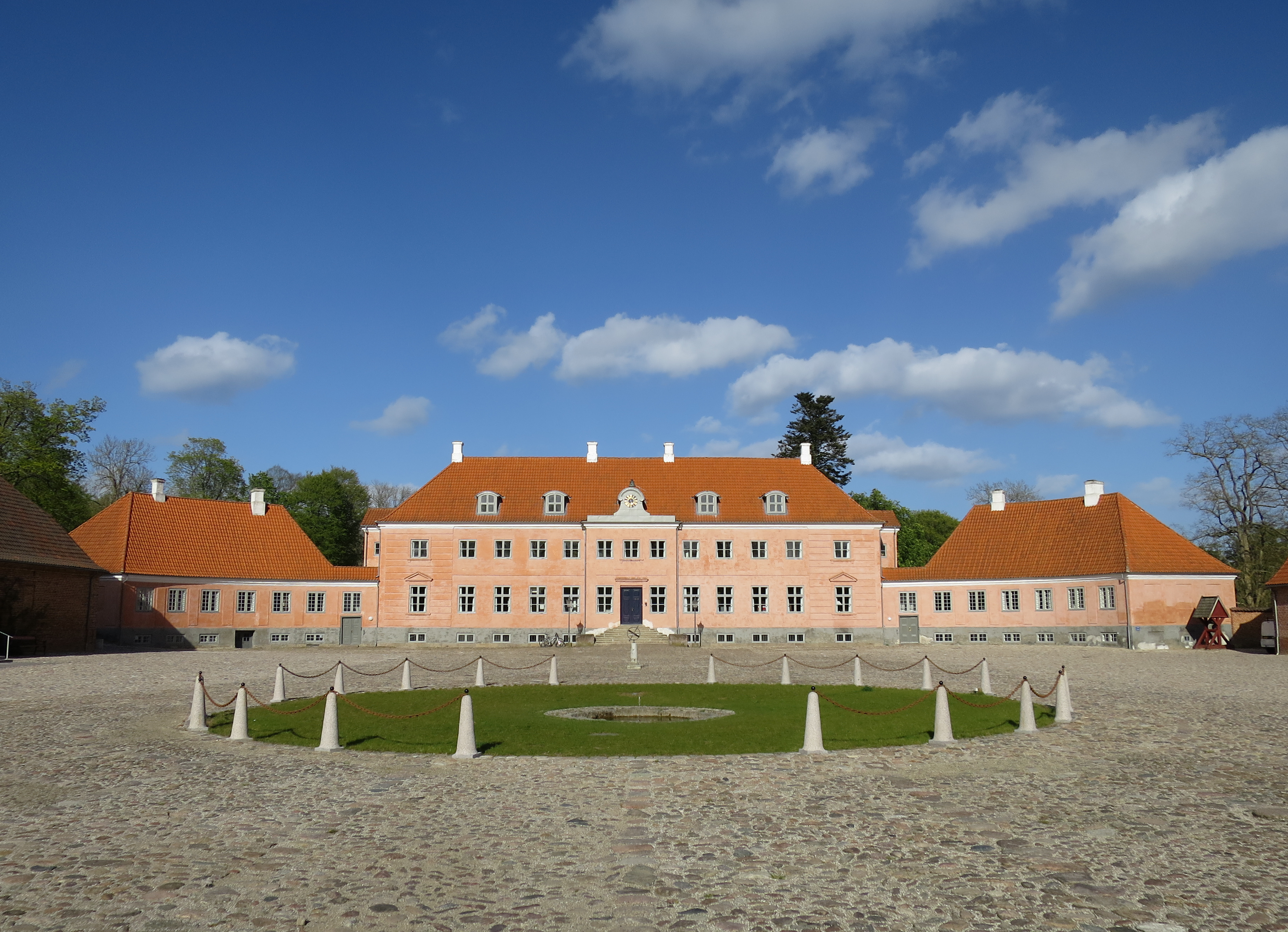
Old manor houses (Moesgård Manor)

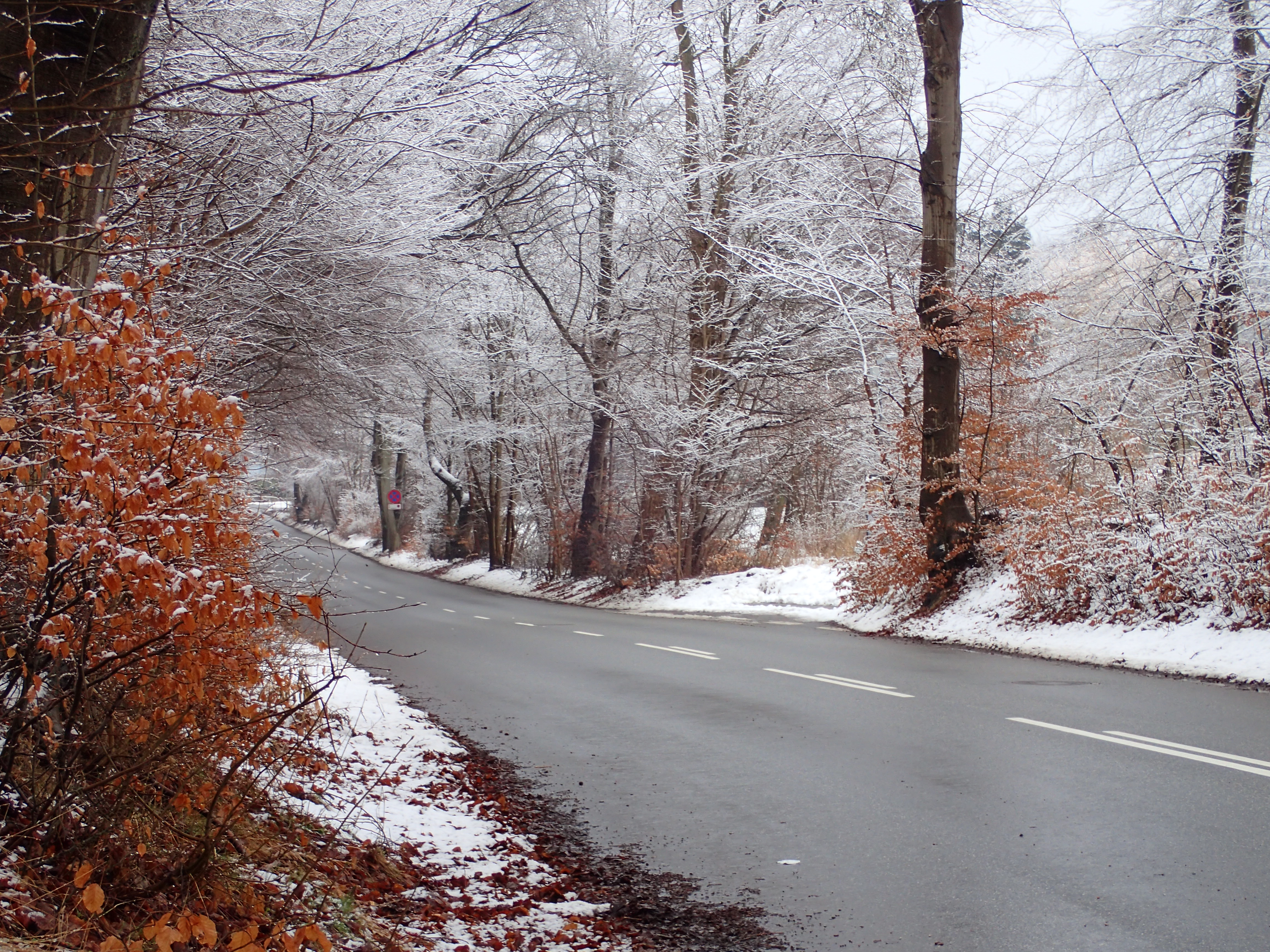
Forest road in winter

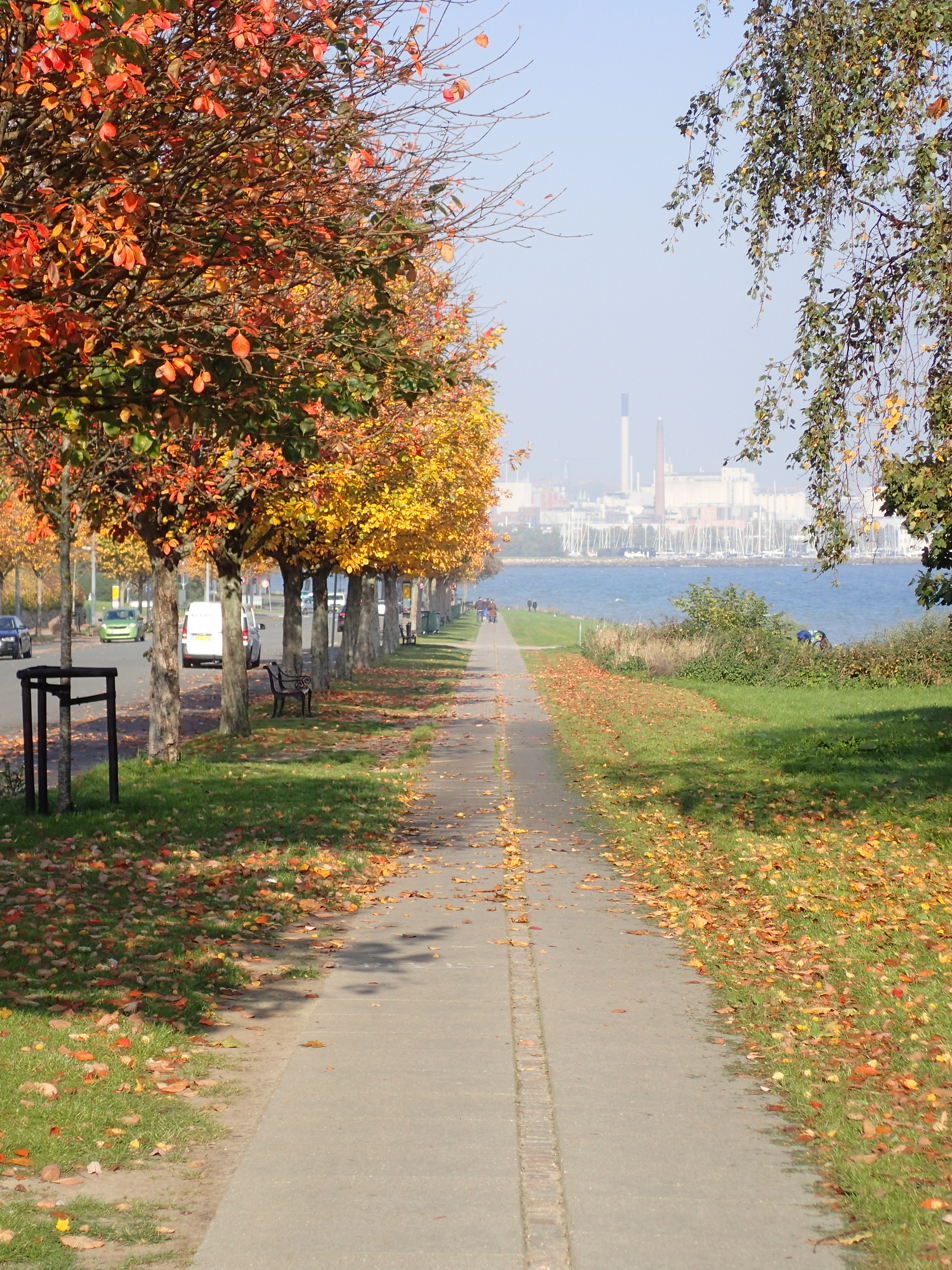
Autumn (Aarhus)
