= The Bachelor Girl (novel) =

1922 novel by Victor Margueritte

- Author: Victor Margueritte
- Original title: La Garçonne
- Translator: Hugh Barnaby
- Language: French
- Publication date: 1922
- Publication place: France

The Bachelor Girl (French: La Garçonne) is a novel by Victor Margueritte first published in 1922. The French title can be translated as "bachelor girl" or "tomboy" or "flapper".

The novel deals with the life of a young woman, Monique Lerbier, who, upon learning that her fiancé is cheating on her, decides to live life freely and on her own terms. Among other things, this included having multiple sexual partners, both male and female.

At the time, the theme was considered scandalous; it even caused the author to lose his Legion of Honour. Sale of the original French book was banned in Britain and Italy.

An English translation was first published in 1923 by Alfred A. Knopf. The translation left out many passages from the original, mostly dealing with Parisian night life and lesbianism. According to the translator's notes, these cuts were at the request of Margueritte.

The novel has been adapted into a film four times, most notably in 1936.

== See also ==
- Flapper
- List of early sound feature films (1926–1929)
