= Victor Margueritte =

French novelist (1866–1942)

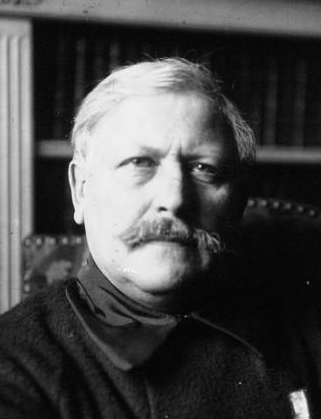
- Portrait of Victor Margueritte in 1918
- Born: 1 December 1866; Blida, French Algeria
- Died: 23 March 1942 (aged 75); Monestier, France
- Occupation: writer
- Parent: Jean Auguste Margueritte
- Relatives: Paul Margueritte (brother); Ève Paul-Margueritte & Lucie Paul-Margueritte (nieces)
- Writing career
- Genres: novels; poetry; histories; theatrical charades

Victor Margueritte (1 December 1866 – 23 March 1942) was a French novelist. He was the younger brother of Paul Margueritte (1860–1918).

== Life ==
He and his brother were born in Algeria. They were the sons of General Jean Auguste Margueritte (1823–1870), who after a career in Algeria was mortally wounded in the great cavalry charge at Sedan and died in Belgium on 6 September 1870. An account of their father's life was published by Paul as Mon père (1884; enlarged ed., 1897). The names of the two brothers are generally associated, on account of their collaboration.

Victor entered his father's regiment, the Chasseurs d'Afrique, in 1888, and served in the army until 1896, when he resigned his commission. He was already known by some volumes of poetry, and by a translation from Calderon (La Double méprise, played at the Odéon, 1898) when he began to collaborate with his brother. Together they worked on several novels and historical works.

Victor Margueritte wrote several theatrical "charades" and collaborated with Paul on at least one pantomime: La Peur. His novel La Garçonne (1922), which depicted a sexually liberated young woman who wanted to "live like a man," was considered so shocking it caused the author to lose his Légion d'honneur.

During the Second World War, Victor Margueritte, a fervent pacifist, collaborated with Germany, like others, in the name of peace. He signed a letter to this effect published in 1941 in L'Œuvre, by Marcel Déat.

Historians have found in the archives of the German Ministry of Foreign Affairs payment slips for money from the massive purchase of Victor Margueritte's works.Moreover, well before the war, large sums of money were invested by the Germans in all of Victor Margueritte's pacifist magazines, in order to make them viable and ensure the reach of their own propaganda.Patrick de Villepin, notice « Victor Margueritte [archive] », in Le Maitron.

== Works ==
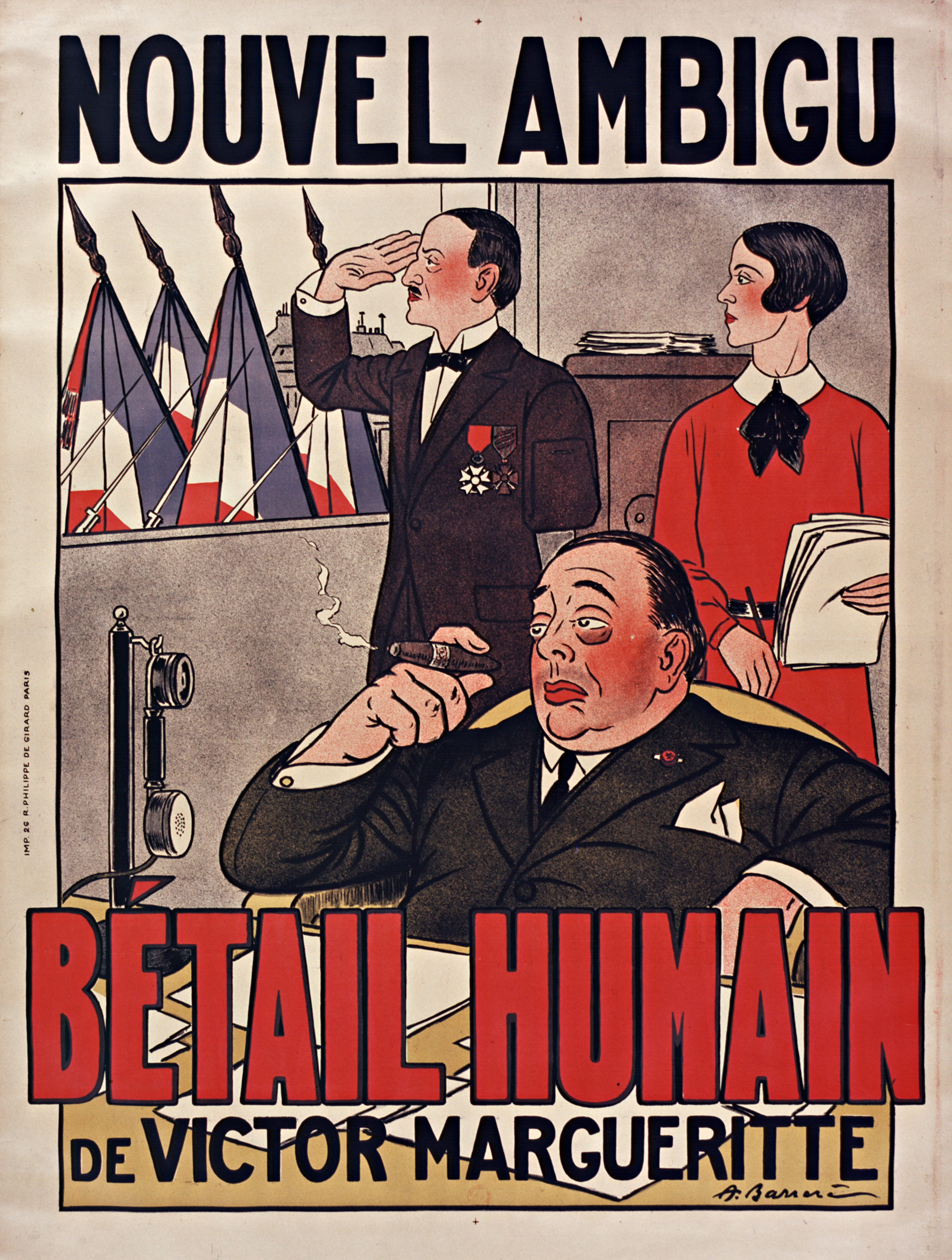

=== Novels ===
- Prostituée (1907)
- Le Talion (1908)
- Jeunes Filles (1908)
- Le Petit roi d'ombre (1909)
- Le Talion (1909)
- L'Or (1910)
- Le Journal d'un moblot (1912)
- Les Frontières du Cœur (1912)
- La Rose des ruines (1913)
- La Terre natale (1917)
- La bétail humain (1920)
- Un cœur farouche (1921)
- Le Soleil dans la geôle (1921)
- The Bachelor Girl (1922)
- Le Compagnon (1923)
- Le Couple (1924)
- Vers le bonheur. Ton corps est à toi (1927)
- Vers le bonheur. Le Bétail humain (1928)
- Vers le bonheur. Le Chant du berger (1930)
- Non ! roman d'une conscience (1931)
- Debout les vivants ! (1932)
- Nos égales. Roman de la femme d'aujourd'hui (1933)
- Du sang sur l'amour (1934)
- Babel (1934)

=== Essays ===
- Pour mieux vivre (1914)
- J.-B. Carpeaux (1914)
- Au bord du gouffre, août-septembre 1914 (1919)
- La Voix de l'Égypte (1919)
- La Dernière Guerre : les Criminels (1925)
- Jean-Jacques et l'amour (1926)
- La Patrie humaine (1931)
- Un grand Français. Le général Margueritte. With pages by Paul Margueritte from Mon père. Centenaire algérien (1960)
- Aristide Briand (1932)
- Les Femmes et le désarmement et de l'immortalité en littérature (1932)
- Avortement de la S.D.N. (1936)
- Le cadavre maquillé. la S.D.N. (mars-septembre 1936) (1936)

=== Various ===
- La Belle au bois dormant (1896), one-act féerie in verse
- La Double méprise, ou le Pire n'est pas toujours certain, d'après Calderon, comedy in four acts in verse, Paris, Théâtre de l'Odéon, 17 March 1898
- Au Fil de l'heure (1896), poetry collection
- L'Imprévu, comedy in two acts, Paris, Comédie-Française, 19 February 1910
- La Mère, play in a prologue and eight scenes, based on the novel by Maxim Gorky, Paris, Théâtre de la Renaissance, 15 May 1937
- Nocturnes, poems (1944)

=== With Paul Margueritte ===
- La Pariétaire (1896)
- Le Carnaval de Nice (1897)
- Poum, aventures d'un petit garçon (1897)
- Une époque (4 volumes, 1897–1904)

- Le désastre (Metz, 1870)
- Les tronçons du glaive (La défense nationale, 1870-71)
- Les braves gens (Épisodes, 1870-71)
- La Commune (Paris, 1871)

- Femmes nouvelles (1899)
- Le Poste des neiges (1899)
- Mariage et divorce (1900)
- Les Deux Vies (1902)
- Le Jardin du Roi (1902)
- L'Eau souterraine (1903)
- Zette, histoire d'une petite fille (1903)
- Histoire de la guerre de 1870-71 (1903)
- Le Prisme (1905)
- Quelques idées : le mariage libre, autour du mariage, pèlerins de Metz, l'oubli et l'histoire, les charges de Sedan, l'officier dans la nation armée, l'Alsace-Lorraine (1905)
- Le Cœur et la loi, play in three acts, Paris, Théâtre de l'Odéon, 9 October 1905
- Sur le vif (1906)
- Vanité (1907)
- L'Autre, play in three acts, Paris, Comédie-Française, 9 December 1907
- Nos Tréteaux. Charades de Victor Margueritte. Pantomimes de Paul Margueritte (1910)
- Les Braves Gens. La Chevauchée au gouffre (Sedan) (1935)
