= List of LGBTQ-related films of the 1920s =

This is a list of lesbian, gay, bisexual, transgender or queer-related films released in the 1920s. It contains theatrically released films that deal with important gay, lesbian, bisexual, transgender or queer characters or issues and may have same-sex romance or relationships as a plot device.

== 1920s ==
Title	Year	Director	Country	Genre	Cast	Notes
An Adventuress	1920	Fred J. Balshofer	United States	Drama	Julian Eltinge, Virginia Rappe, Rudolph Valentino, Frederick Ko Vert, William Clifford and Leo White	
Hamlet	1921	Svend Gade, Heinz Schall	Germany	Drama	Asta Nielsen, Paul Conradi, Mathilde Brandt, Eduard von Winterstein, Heinz Stieda, Hans Junkermann, Anton De Verdier, Lilly Jacobson and Fritz Achterberg	a.k.a. Hamlet: Ein Rachedrama (Hamlet: The Drama of Vengeance); features a female Hamlet
Manslaughter	1922	Cecil B. DeMille	United States	Drama	Leatrice Joy, Thomas Meighan, Lois Wilson, John Miltern, George Fawcett, Julia Faye, Edythe Chapman, Jack Mower, Dorothy Cumming, Casson Ferguson, Mickey Moore, James Neill, Sylvia Ashton, Raymond Hatton, Mabel Van Buren, Ethel Wales, Dale Fuller, Edward Martindel	Based on the novel of the same name by Alice Duer Miller; considered the first American feature film to show an erotic kiss between two members of the same sex
Salomé	1922	Charles Bryant	United States	Biography, drama	Alla Nazimova, Michael Lewis, Rose Dione, Earl Schenck, Arthur Jasmine, Nigel De Brulier, Frederick Peters, Louis Dumar	Based on the play of the same name by Oscar Wilde, which itself is a loose re-telling of the biblical story of Herod Antipas and his execution of John the Baptist
La Garçonne	1923	Armand du Plessy	France	Drama	France Dhélia, Renée Carl, José Davert, Pierre Delmonde, Georges Deneubourg and Gaston Jacquet	Based on the novel of the same name by Victor Margueritte.
Ponjola	1923	Donald Crisp	United States	Drama	Anna Q. Nilsson, James Kirkwood, Tully Marshall, Joseph Kilgour, Bernard Randall, Ruth Clifford, Claire Du Brey, Claire McDowell, Charles Ray, Eddie Sturgis (credited as Edwin Sturges)	Based on the novel of the same name by Cynthia Stockley
The Soilers	1923	Ralph Ceder	United States	Short, comedy	Stan Laurel, Ena Gregory, Mae Laurel, James Finlayson, Billy Engle, Eddie Baker	
Leblebici Horhor	1923	Muhsin Ertuğrul	Turkey	Musical, romance	Behzat Butak, Elena Artinova, Maurice Méa, Gavros Toloyan and Jenya Gordenskaya	a.k.a. The Chickpea Seller, based on the operetta of the same name by Tigran Chukhajian
Augusto Anibal quer casar	1923	Luiz de Barros	Brazil	Comedy		
Michael	1924	Carl Theodor Dreyer	Germany	Drama	Walter Slezak, Benjamin Christensen, Nora Gregor, Robert Garrison, Max Auzinger, Didier Aslan, Alexander Murski, Grete Mosheim, Karl Freund	a.k.a. Mikaël: Chained, The Story of the Third Sex and Heart's Desire; based on the novel Mikaël by Herman Bang
Beverly of Graustark	1926	Sidney Franklin	United States	Comedy, romance	Marion Davies, Antonio Moreno, Creighton Hale, Roy D'Arcy, Albert Gran, Paulette Duval, Max Barwyn, Charles Clary	Based on the novel of the same name by George Barr McCutcheon
The Fiddler of Florence	1926	Paul Czinner	Germany	Comedy	Elisabeth Bergner, Conrad Veidt, Nora Gregor, Walter Rilla, Grete Mosheim and Ellen Plessow	
The Girl in Tails	1926	Karin Swanström	Sweden	Comedy, drama	Einar Axelsson, Magda Holm, Nils Aréhn, Georg Blomstedt, Karin Swanström, Kar de Mumma, Carina May, Lotten Olsson, Anna-Lisa Baude and Gösta Gustafson	a.k.a. Flickan i frack; based on the novel of the same name by Hjalmar Bergman
Irene	1926	Alfred E. Green	United States	Comedy, romance	Colleen Moore, Lloyd Hughes, George K. Arthur, Maryon Aye, Ida Darling, Edward Earle and Bess Flowers	Based on the musical of the same name by James Montgomery.
The Crystal Cup	1927	John Francis Dillon	United States	Drama	Dorothy Mackaill, Rockliffe Fellowes, Jack Mulhall, Clarissa Selwynne, Jane Winton, Edythe Chapman and Yvonne Pelletier	Based on the novel of the same name by Gertrude Atherton.
Why Girls Love Sailors	1927	Fred Guiol	United States	Short, comedy	Stan Laurel, Oliver Hardy, Viola Richard, Anita Garvin, Malcolm Waite	
A Wanderer of the West	1927	Robin Williamson, Joseph E. Zivelli	United States	Western		
Gesetze der Liebe	1927	Magnus Hirschfeld, Richard Oswald	Germany	Documentary		a.k.a. Laws of Love; includes an abridged version of the 1919 film Different from the Others
Beggars of Life	1928	William A. Wellman	United States	Adventure, drama	Wallace Beery, Louise Brooks, Richard Arlen, Bob Perry, Blue Washington, Roscoe Karns	
Different Women	1928	Heinz Hanus	Austria	Drama	Rina De Liguoro, Vivian Gibson, Mary Kid, Mizi Griebl, Oscar Beregi, Hans Peppler and Oskar Marion	a.k.a. Andere Frauen; based on the novel Das entfesselte Wien by Hugo Bettauer
Sex in Chains	1928	William Dieterle	Germany	Drama	William Dieterle, Gunnar Tolnæs, Mary Johnson, Paul Henckels, Hans Heinrich von Twardowski	a.k.a. Geschlecht in Fesseln
The Broadway Melody	1929	Harry Beaumont	United States	Musical	Anita Page, Bessie Love, Charles King, Jed Prouty, Kenneth Thomson, Edward Dillon, Mary Doran, Eddie Kane, J. Emmett Beck, Marshall Ruth and Drew Demarest	
Pandora's Box	1929	Georg Wilhelm Pabst	Germany	Crime, drama	Louise Brooks, Fritz Kortner, Francis Lederer	a.k.a. Die Büchse der Pandora; based on the plays Earth Spirit and Pandora's Box by Frank Wedekind
That's My Wife	1929	Lloyd French	United States	Short, comedy	Stan Laurel, Oliver Hardy	
