= The Woman from Hell =

1929 film

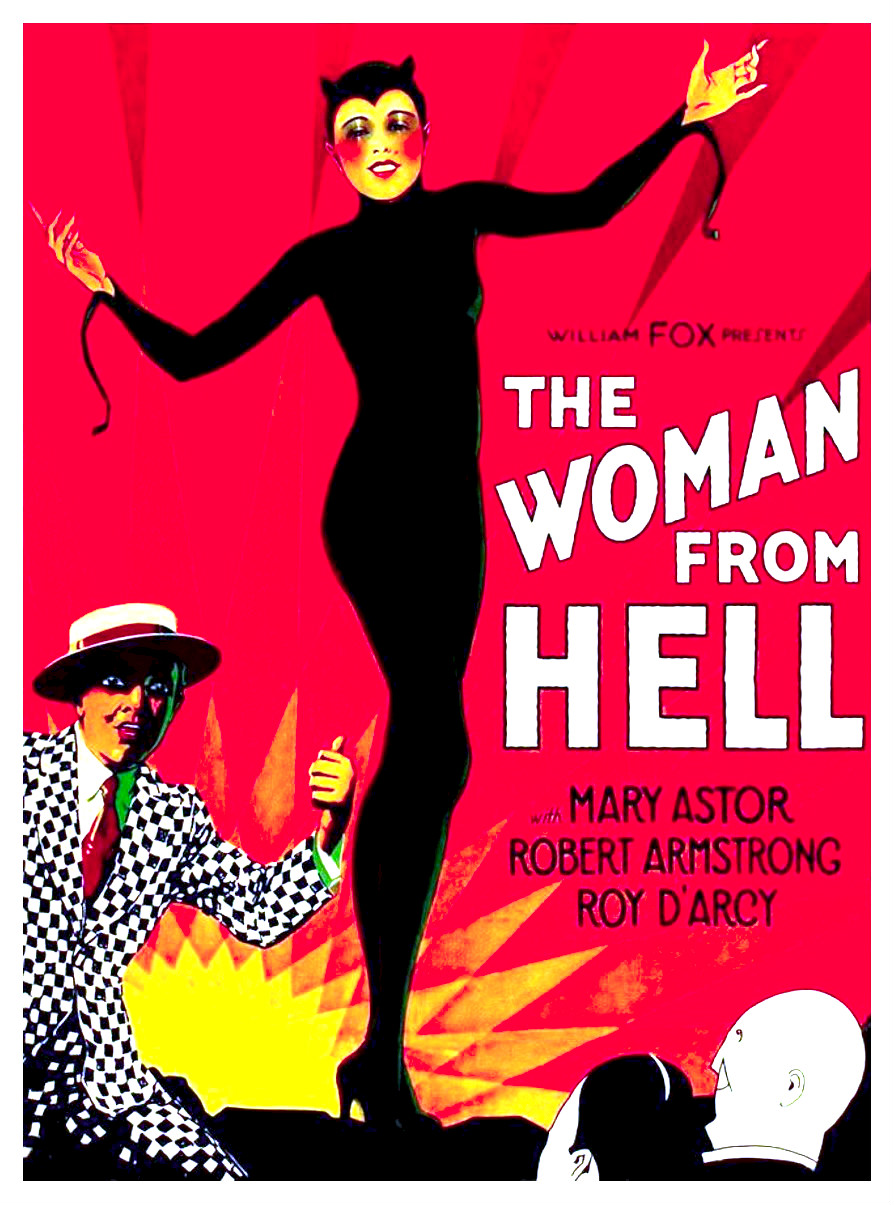
- Film poster
- Directed by: A. F. Erickson; Ewing Scott (ass't director)
- Written by: Jaime Del Rio (story); Lois Leeson (story); Annette Scarborough (adapt.); George Scarborough (adapt.); Ray Doyle (writer); Charles Kenyon (writer); Malcolm Stuart Boylan (intertitles)
- Produced by: William Fox; James Kevin McGuinness
- Starring: Mary Astor
- Cinematography: Conrad Wells
- Distributed by: Fox Film Corporation
- Release date: April 21, 1929
- Running time: 58 minutes
- Country: United States
- Languages: Sound (Synchronized) (English Intertitles)

The Woman from Hell, known in some markets as The Woman from Luna or The Woman of Damnation, is a 1929 American synchronized sound drama film produced and distributed by Fox Film Corporation and starring Mary Astor. Although the film had no dialogue, it featured a synchronized Movietone sound track of music and sound effects. This was Dean Jagger's film debut. It is considered to be a lost film.

== Plot ==
Dee Renaud is a girl playing the "Devil" in an amusement concession at a beach resort. Slick Glicks, the barker, promises the yokels that if they are able to catch the "Lady From Hell," she will reward them with a kiss. But when Glicks tries to go beyond kissing, Dee is rescued by Jim Coakley, son of a New England lighthouse keeper. She marries him out of gratitude and they move to his home on an island off the rockbound coast. Dee tries to convince Jim's salty old father, Pat, that she will be a good and faithful wife. But she is a passionate woman with a bit of the devil in her, and she flirts with Jim's best friend Alf, who invites her to elope to Havana with him. When Pat is incapacitated, however, Dee loyally remains in the lighthouse to operate the beam and avert a shipwreck.

== Cast ==
- Mary Astor as Dee Renaud
- Robert Armstrong as Alf
- Dean Jagger as Jim Coakley
- Roy D'Arcy as 'Slick' Glicks
- May Boley as Mother Price
- James Bradbury Sr. as Pat
- Billy Gilbert

== See also ==
- 1937 Fox vault fire
- List of early sound feature films (1926–1929)
