= Secret Strings =

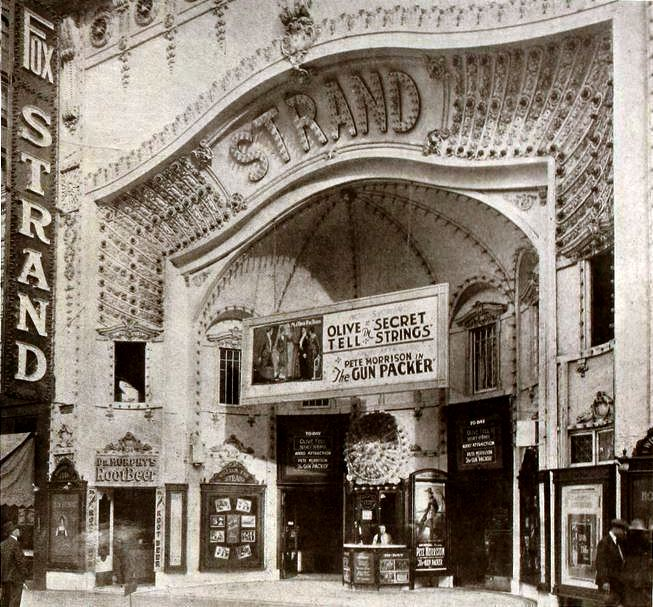
- Strand Theater in Denver, Colorado, showing the films Secret Strings (1918) and The Gun Packer (1919)
- Directed by: John Ince
- Written by: June Mathis
- Based on: Secret Strings (play) by Kate Jordan
- Produced by: Maxwell Karger
- Starring: Olive Tell
- Cinematography: Frank D. Williams
- Distributed by: Metro Pictures
- Release date: October 7, 1918
- Running time: 5 reels
- Country: United States
- Language: Silent (English intertitles)

Secret Strings is a lost 1918 American silent crime drama film produced and distributed by Metro Pictures. Olive Tell, a stage actress, starred in the story based on a play by Kate Jordan. John Ince directed.

== Plot ==
As described in a film magazine, Janet Howell (Tell) discovers that her husband Raoul (Kelly) is a crook. She leaves him and attempts to make a living painting pictures. She takes a position as a companion to Mrs. de Giles (Wainwright) in the hope of recovering some valuable mining property which her husband assures her belongs to a friend of his. Her husband visits the house using the name Newell and tells her to find where the safe is located. Newell drugs the coffee so that the de Giles and Hugh Maxwell (Thompson), a relative, fall into a stupor, and he tells Janet to change her clothes and be ready to leave with him. However, the de Giles are cleverer detectives and have been waiting for this chance to catch their man, and Newell is arrested. He makes a last frantic attempt to escape but is shot by the Detective (Lawrence) and falls down the stairs and breaks his neck. Janet's innocence is believed and Hugh confesses his love for her.

== Cast ==
- Olive Tell as Janet Howell
- William J. Kelly as Raoul Howell / Newell
- Hugh Thompson as Hugh Maxwell
- John Daly Murphy as Richard de Giles
- Marie Wainwright as Mrs. de Giles
- Hugh Jeffrey as Ross
- Barbara Winthrop as Katia
- Bert Tuey as Williams
- John Smiley as Benjamin Moraud
- Edward Lawrence as Detective

== Reception ==
Like many American films of the time, Secret Strings was subject to cuts by city and state film censorship boards. For example, the Chicago Board of Censors required a cut, in Reel 5, gagging and binding the young woman, two scenes of thieves at panel, and emptying jewels from tray into bag.
