= Lois Zellner =

American screenwriter

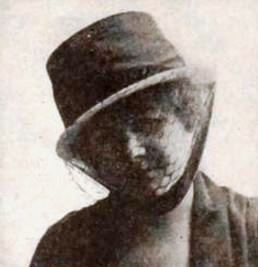
- Exhibitors Herald, May 1, 1920
- Born: Lois Grier; January 24, 1883; Macon, Georgia, US
- Died: January 14, 1937 (aged 53); Los Angeles, California, US
- Other names: Lois Leeson
- Occupation: Screenwriter
- Years active: 1916–1935
- Spouses: John Wyncoup Murray (divorced) Arthur J. Zellner (divorced): Thomas J. Haley

Lois Zellner (born Lois Grier; January 24, 1883 – January 14, 1937) was an American screenwriter active during Hollywood's silent era. She also went by the name Lois Leeson later in her career.

== Biography ==
=== Beginnings ===
Born Lois Grier to Clark Grier and Minnie Walthour, Zellner was raised in Macon, Georgia, where she met and married her first husband, John Wyncoup Murray Sr., in 1899 at age 15. The pair had three children before divorcing around 1911. Zellner moved to New York and got into advertising before finding her way as a journalist and writing scenarios on the side, pitching them but struggling to sell them.

=== Hollywood career ===
In 1913, she married Arthur J. Zellner, future studio publicity man, in New York. The two would collaborate on a number of plays together before taking their savings and moving to Hollywood. The first script Lois sold was 1916's The Innocent Lie (Famous Players–Lasky). From 1916 through 1926, Lois worked steadily, writing scripts and scenarios for directors like Sidney Olcott and Victor Schertzinger.

In 1921, she and Arthur Zellner divorced; a friend of hers testified that Lois had always been the breadwinner, and that it caused contention in the marriage. A few years after their marriage ended—around the time she signed a contract to work with Edwin Carewe at First National—she began going by the name Lois Leeson professionally. She and Carewe worked on a number of films together in the 1920s. In 1928, her script from The Woman from Hell was made into a stage play performed at the Hollywood Playhouse before being turned into a 1929 film of the same name.

In 1935 her script for Busby Berkeley's Bright Lights was acclaimed. She died in California in 1937.

=== Personal life ===
Lois was married three times. Two of her sons with John Murray forged careers for themselves in Hollywood: Clark Murray became an assistant director and a publicity man, and Jack Murray became a film editor noted for his long collaboration with the director John Ford.

== Selected filmography ==
- Bright Lights (1935)
- The Woman from Hell (1929)
- Molly and Me (1929)
- Pals First (1926)
- High Steppers (1926)
- Law or Loyalty (1926) (adaptation)
- Joanna (1925)
- Why Women Love (1925)
- The Lady Who Lied (1925)
- Drusilla with a Million (1925) (scenario)
- Speed (1925) (adaptation)
- Flaming Love (1925)
- The Family Secret (1924) (scenario)
- The Foolish Virgin (1924)
- The Law Forbids (1924)
- The Whispered Name (1924)
- Bag and Baggage (1923)
- The Man Between (1923)
- The Scarlet Lily (1923)
- The Lonely Road (1923) (adaptation)
- Her Accidental Husband (1923)
- Refuge (1923)
- White Shoulders (1922) (adaptation)
- Rich Men's Wives (1922) (scenario)
- Should a Wife Work? (1922)
- Fine Feathers (1921)
- Payment Guaranteed (1921)
- The Misleading Lady (1920) (scenario)
- The Gamesters (1920) (story)
- Someone in the House (1920) (scenario)
- The Misfit Wife (1920) (scenario)
- The Cheater (1920)
- The Dangerous Talent (1920)
- Eve in Exile (1919) (scenario)
- Turning the Tables (1919) (scenario)
- Nobody Home (1919) (scenario)
- Bill Henry (1919) (scenario)
- Happy Though Married (1919) (scenario)
- His Bonded Wife (1918) (story)
- The Silent Woman (1918) (story)
- Money Mad (1918) (scenario)
- The Girl from Bohemia (1918) (story)
- Friend Husband (1918) (story)
- A Mother's Secret (1918) (story)
- Over the Hill (1917)
- Giving Becky a Chance (1917) (story)
- As Men Love (1917) (story)
- The Little Brother (1917) (story)
- The Innocent Lie (1916) (scenario)
