= The Scarlet Lily =

1923 film by Victor Schertzinger

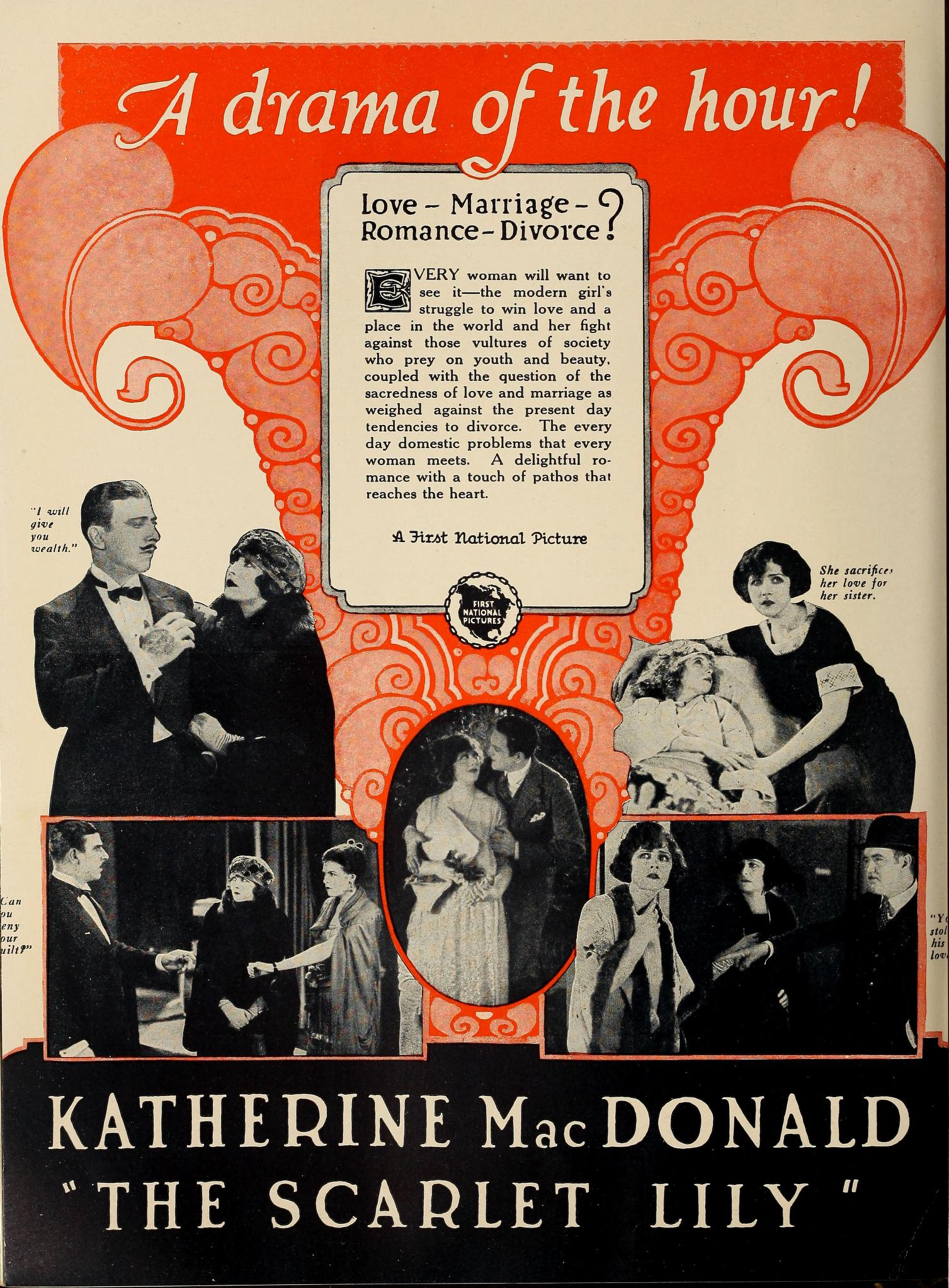
- Directed by: Victor Schertzinger
- Written by: Florence Hein; Lois Zellner
- Story by: Fred Sittenham
- Produced by: B. P. Schulberg
- Starring: Katherine MacDonald; Orville Caldwell; Stuart Holmes
- Cinematography: Joseph Brotherton
- Edited by: Eve Unsell
- Production company: Preferred Pictures
- Distributed by: First National Pictures
- Release date: July 15, 1923
- Running time: 6 reels
- Country: United States
- Languages: Silent; English intertitles

The Scarlet Lily is a lost 1923 American silent drama film directed by Victor Schertzinger and starring Katherine MacDonald, Orville Caldwell and Stuart Holmes.

== Plot ==
According to a film magazine, "Dora Mason, who has accepted the hospitality of a married man's apartment in all innocence and then finds ensuing circumstances reflecting on her character because of the purely innocent itinerary in the Jessup Barnes suite. Barnes, a married man, commissioned the interior decorating firm which employed Dora to fix up a new apartment for him. Miss Mason is the one assigned to the task, and Barnes commits a bad break at the installation night's party. Dora leaves in a huff, returning to her squalid hall bedroom to find her ailing sister. Mollie, on the ebb. The landlady, objecting to anything happening in her house, demands possession of the room, and Dora faces a tough situation because of her depicted exchequer (She has lost her position meantime). Comes a note from Barnes inviting her to use the apartment for a month In his absence out of town, which Dora is forced to accept in view of her sister's plight.

The situation becomes complicated with the intervention of Mrs. Barnes and her private detective on Barnes' return at an unfortunate moment, and Dora Mason is publicized as a co-respondent. In a country retreat Lawson Dean, a promising political figure, renews acquaintance with the heroine, having come up to recuperate from severe eye-strain. Her marriage to the lawyer, who has announced his candidacy for District Attorney, ruins his political chances when Mrs. Barnes recognizes the newlywed bride as the supposed "other woman." The usual situation about the husband's suspicions and disbelief and her efforts to establish her innocence follow, with the final fade-out satisfactory all around."

== Cast ==
- Katherine MacDonald as Dora Mason
- Orville Caldwell as Lawson Dean
- Stuart Holmes as Jessup Barnes
- Edith Lyle as Mrs. Barnes
- Adele Farrington as Trixie Montresse
- J. Gordon Russell as Laurence Peyton
- Grace Morse as Beatrice Milo
- Jane Miskimin as Little Mollie
- Lincoln Stedman as John Rankin
- Gertrude Quality as Mrs. Rosetta Bowen

== Production ==
Exhibitor's Trade Review reported that filming would begin on August 21, 1922, but is contradicted by the filming chart published by Camera!. Exteriors for The Scarlet Lily were filmed on location at Lake Arrowhead, California.

== Reception ==
The Film Daily gave the film a mixed review, praising the "excellent" production, but found the story to be "very conventional."

Variety gave the film a mostly positive review, finding the story to be "considerable," though felt that Orville Caldwell was not used to his full extent.

Exhibitor's Trade Review was also quite positive, despite having the same criticisms of the story as The Film Daily review, as the reviewer felt that Victor Schertzinger handled the story well. The reviewer praised Katherine MacDonald for her performance, "demonstrating her keen sense of dramatic values," as well as the rest of the cast. The cinematography and interiors were also lauded.

== Censorship ==
Before the film could be exhibited in Kansas, the Kansas Board of Review required the elimination of all scenes where women are smoking in a cafe.

== Preservation ==
With no holdings located in archives, The Scarlet Lily is considered a lost film.

== Bibliography ==
- James Robert Parish & Michael R. Pitts. Film directors: a guide to their American films. Scarecrow Press, 1974.
