= The Golden Gift =

1922 film by Maxwell Karger

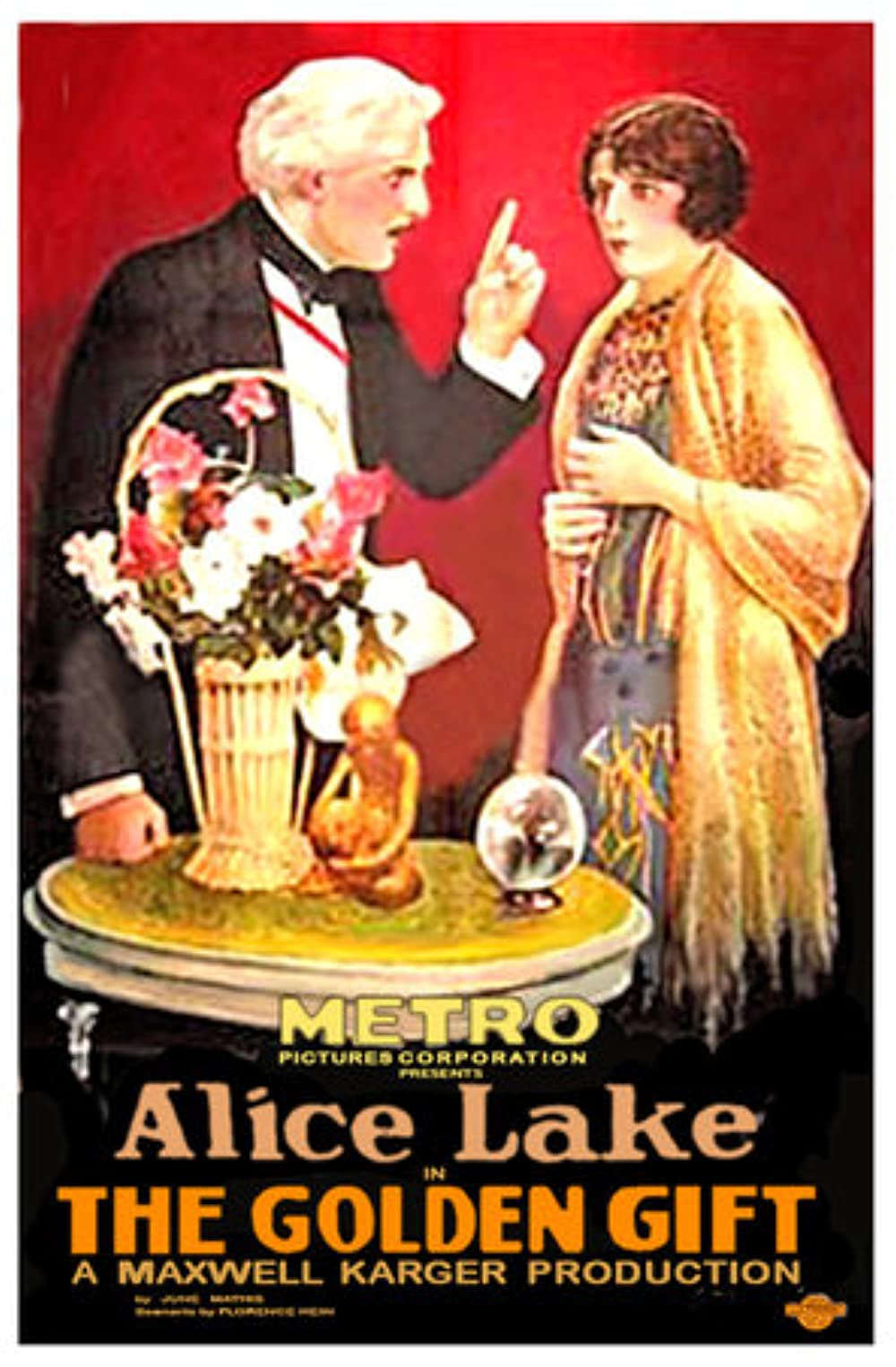
- Theatrical poster
- Directed by: Maxwell Karger
- Written by: Florence Hein
- Story by: June Mathis
- Based on: The Gift by Henry B. Harris
- Starring: Alice Lake; John Bowers; Harriet Hammond
- Cinematography: John W. Boyle
- Production company: Metro Pictures
- Distributed by: Metro Pictures
- Release date: February 6, 1922
- Running time: 5 reels
- Country: United States
- Language: Silent (English intertitles)

The Golden Gift is a 1922 American silent drama film directed by Maxwell Karger and starring Alice Lake, John Bowers, and Harriet Hammond.

== Plot ==
As described in a film magazine, Nita Gordon (Lake), a dancer in a Mexican cafe near the border, is befriended by an Italian man who expresses interest in her. She has been deserted by her husband and leaves her baby at a mission where it is adopted by a wealthy family. Five years later in New York City, after attaining success, she meets wealthy patron of the opera James Llewelyn (Bowers) and falls in love with him. He learns that Nita is the mother of the child he had adopted through a photograph that she gives him that contains some writing. Nita admits the truth and is happily reunited with her child.

== Cast ==
- Alice Lake as Nita Gordon
- John Bowers as James Llewelyn
- Harriet Hammond as Edith Llewelyn
- Josef Swickard as Leonati
- Bridgetta Clark as Rosana
- Louis Dumar as Malcolm Thorne
- Geoffrey Webb as Stephen Brand
- Camilla Clark as Joy Llewelyn

== Bibliography ==
- Munden, Kenneth White. The American Film Institute Catalog of Motion Pictures Produced in the United States, Part 1. University of California Press, 1997.
