= By Divine Right (film) =

1924 silent film

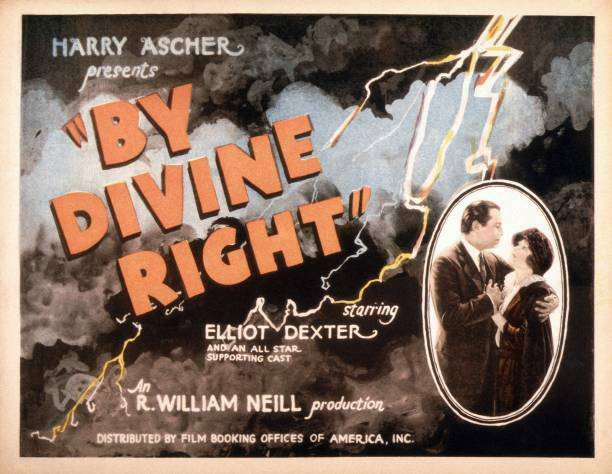
- Directed by: Roy William Neill
- Written by: Florence Hein; Josef von Sternberg
- Based on: The Way Men Love by Adam Shirk
- Produced by: Harry Asher
- Starring: Mildred Harris; Anders Randolf; Elliott Dexter
- Cinematography: Ray June
- Production company: Grand Asher Films
- Distributed by: Film Booking Offices of America
- Release date: February 17, 1924
- Running time: 70 minutes
- Country: United States
- Language: Silent (English intertitles)

By Divine Right is a lost 1924 American silent drama film directed by Roy William Neill and starring Mildred Harris, Anders Randolf and Elliott Dexter.

== Synopsis ==
Mildred a young stenographer takes shelter at a mission run by Austin Farrol after escaping from attempts to seduce her by her unscrupulous employer Trent.

== Cast ==
- Mildred Harris as Mildred
- Anders Randolf as Trent
- Elliott Dexter as Austin Farrol
- Sidney Bracey as The Hireling
- Jeanne Carpenter as Trent Baby
- Grace Carlyle as Mrs. Trent
- DeWitt Jennings as Tug Wilson

== Censorship ==
Before By Divine Right could be exhibited in Kansas, the Kansas Board of Review required the removal of a scene in reel 6 where a man pushes a woman's dress off of her shoulder.

== Bibliography ==
- Connelly, Robert B. The Silents: Silent Feature Films, 1910–36, Volume 40, Issue 2. December Press, 1998.
- Munden, Kenneth White. The American Film Institute Catalog of Motion Pictures Produced in the United States, Part 1. University of California Press, 1997.
