= The Gun Packer =

1919 film directed by John Ford

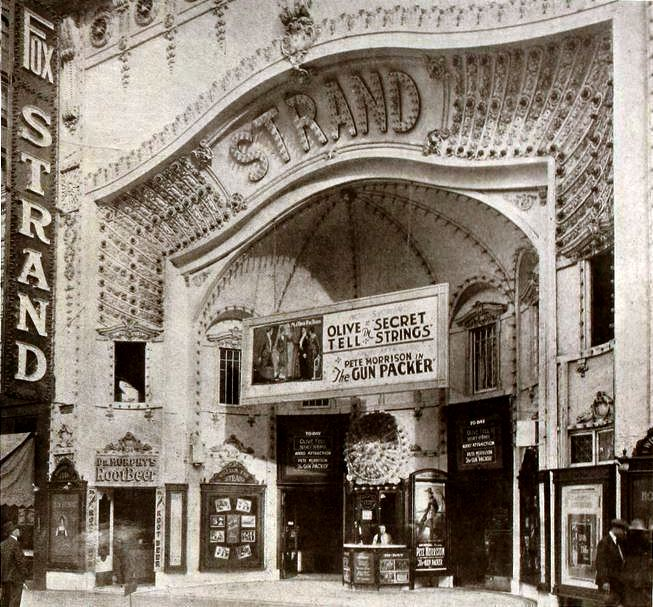
- Strand Theater in Denver, Colorado, showing the films Secret Strings (1918) and The Gun Packer
- Directed by: John Ford
- Written by: Harry Carey; Karl R. Coolidge; John Ford
- Starring: Ed Jones; Pete Morrison
- Cinematography: John W. Brown
- Release date: May 24, 1919
- Running time: 20 minutes
- Country: United States
- Languages: Silent; English intertitles

The Gun Packer is a 1919 American short silent Western film directed by John Ford. Filming began on March 25, 1919, under the working title Out Wyoming Way. Just two months later, The Gun Packer was released by Universal Studios as a 20-minute silent film on two reels. This film was reissued in August 1924.

== Plot ==
A reformed outlaw enlists the aid of his former gunslinging companions to defend a small shepherd community from domineering cattle barons.

== Cast ==
- Ed Jones as Sandy McLoughlin
- Pete Morrison as "Pearl Handle" Wiley
- Magda Lane as Rose McLoughlin
- Jack Woods as Pecos Smith
- Hoot Gibson as Gang Leader
- Jack Walters as Brown
- Duke R. Lee as Buck Landers
- Howard Enstaedt as Bobby McLoughlin

== See also ==
- John Ford filmography
- Hoot Gibson filmography
