= Arthur J. Zellner =

American screenwriter

Arthur Julian Zellner
- Born: December 2, 1883; Memphis, Tennessee, US
- Died: September 9, 1952 (aged 68); Burbank, California, US
- Education: Louisiana State University
- Occupation(s): Screenwriter, publicity agent, film editor
- Spouse(s): Lois Zellner (div.); Helen Lovett

Arthur Julian Zellner (1883 – 1952) was an American screenwriter and film studio publicity man active from the 1920s through the 1940s.

== Biography ==
Arthur was born to David Zellner and Annie Sonfield in Memphis, Tennessee. He attended college at Louisiana State University.

In 1913, he married Lois Grier Murray in New York City, where he was working as a journalist. The pair would collaborate on several plays and scenarios before pooling their savings and moving to Hollywood, where he'd work at American Film Company, Metro, and Paramount. The pair worked on a number of screenplays together before divorcing in 1921.

Soon after, he met and married Helen Lovett, with whom he had two daughters. Around this time, he left writing scripts behind, taking on jobs as a personal representative and publicity agent. He served as the personal representative of Mary Pickford and Douglas Fairbanks for eight years. He continued working in publicity at Warner Bros. Pictures and Universal Pictures until his death in 1952.

== Selected filmography ==
- Extra! Extra! (1922)
- The Devil Within (1921)
- Desert Blossoms (1921)
- The Infamous Miss Revell (1921)
- The Match-Breaker (1921)
- The Man Who (1921)
- A Message from Mars (1921)
- Polly With a Past (1920)
- Clothes (1920)
- The Week-End (1920)
- Shore Acres (1920)
- Happy Though Married (1919)
- His Bonded Wife (1918)
