= Clothes (1920 film) =

1920 film

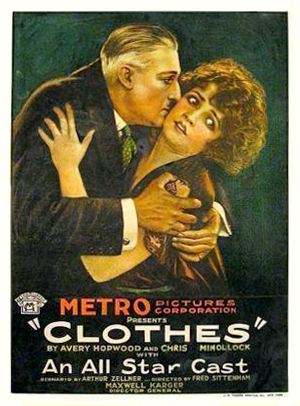
- Window card
- Directed by: Fred Sittenham
- Written by: Arthur J. Zellner (scenario)
- Based on: Clothes by Channing Pollock and Avery Hopwood
- Produced by: Maxwell Karger
- Cinematography: Arthur A. Cadwell
- Production company: Metro Pictures
- Distributed by: Metro Pictures
- Release date: 19 September 1920
- Running time: 5 reels
- Country: United States
- Language: Silent (English intertitles)

Clothes is a 1920 American silent drama film directed by Fred Sittenham and produced and distributed by the Metro Pictures company. It is based on a 1906 Broadway play, Clothes, by Channing Pollock and Avery Hopwood. The play starred Grace George with a young supporting player named Douglas Fairbanks. A 1914 silent film was produced and is now lost. This 1920 version from Metro starred Olive Tell. By all accounts this version is lost as well.

== Plot ==
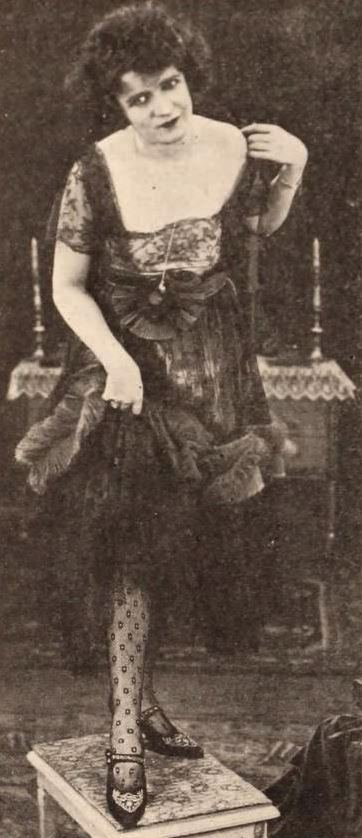
Olive Tell in Clothes

As described in a film magazine, Olivia Sherwood, an orphan whose supposed father has left her nothing but a block of worthless mining stock, spends a fortune on clothes, her greatest weakness. Arnold West, who pays Olivia her income, deceives her into thinking the money is hers, scheming and hoping that one day Olivia will be his, whether he marries her or not. However, Arnold's income dwindles so fast that he is forced to tell Olivia that her income is much smaller than she thinks it is and that she will have to go slow. Mrs. Cathcart advises Olivia to marry as the simplest and easiest way to settle the matter, but to marry a wealthy man. That man is Richard Burbank, a wealthy Canadian visiting relatives in New York. Olivia meets him at an affair, and immediately he is in love. A week later he proposes to her in a roundabout way, and by the time he is through hemming and hawing, in walks Arnold. Richard says that he will be back in an hour and Olivia should be alone. Arnold attempts to press his attentions on Olivia, but she repulses him. He then tells her that she is marrying Richard for money, but that he is more honorable than she as he tells the truth. Arnold apologizes for his hasty words and leaves. Arnold returns, but now Olivia is thinking of the error of her ways, so she refuses him. Arnold, wishing to disillusion Richard, cunning arranges for him to be at his house when Olivia calls on him for a business matter. Richard naturally thinks the worse of her. Several days later Olivia learns that the stock her father left her is worthless. Arnold, who has been drinking, tells her that he has been keeping her, and unless she comes to him, he will tell everyone plus a little imagination. She shrinks from him in horror and slowly climbs the stairs, and he lurches after her. At the top step he lunges at her, but she fearfully dodges, and the momentum of this upsets him and he falls down the stairs. Richard, having heard everything, rushes to her side and forgives her.

== Cast ==
- Olive Tell as Olivia Sherwood
- Crauford Kent as Richard Burbank
- Cyril Chadwick as Arnold West
- Zeffie Tilbury as Mrs. Cathcart
- Ray Allen as Mrs. Watling (credited as Rae Allen)
- Frank Currier as Horace Watling
- Mary Beaton as Miss Mazie
