= The Call of Youth =

1921 British film by Hugh Ford

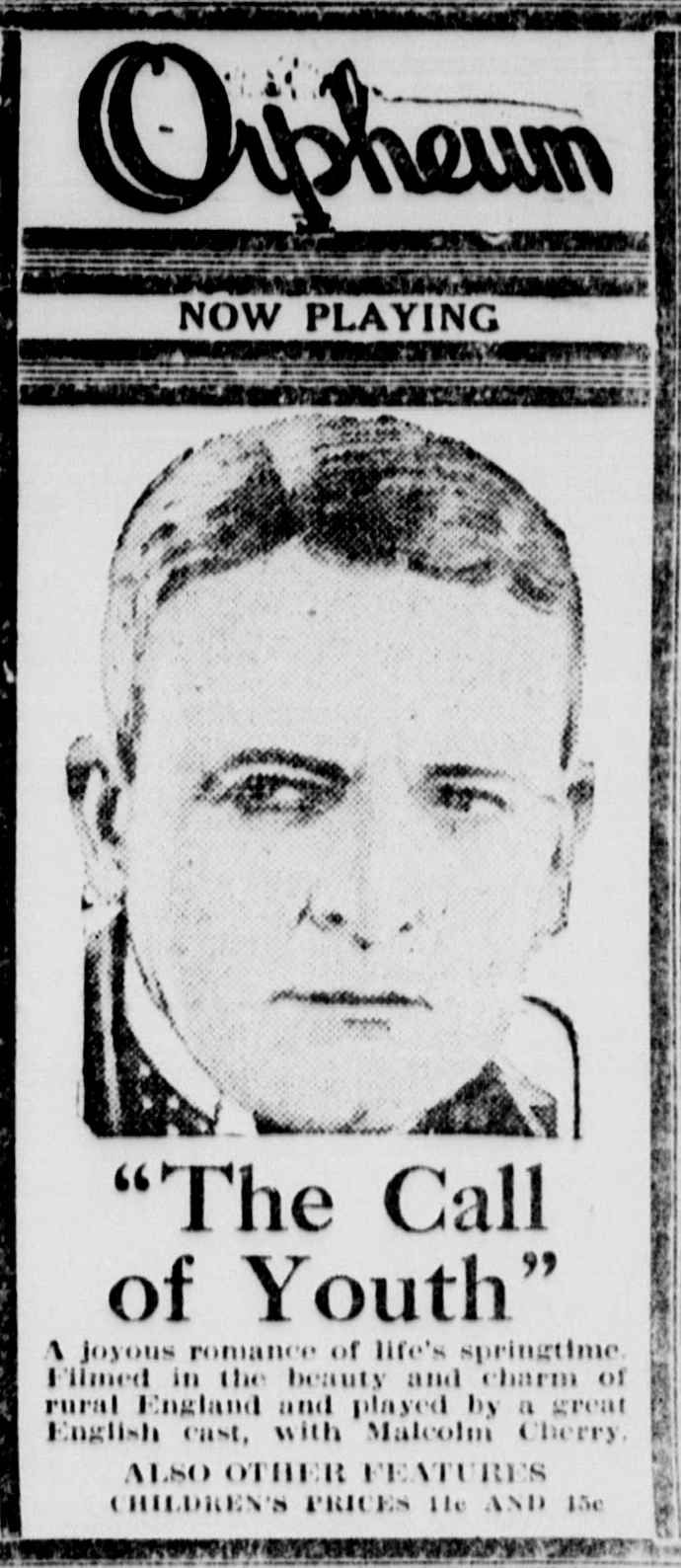
- A contemporary newspaper advertisement.
- Directed by: Hugh Ford
- Written by: Henry Arthur Jones (play "James the Fogey"); Eve Unsell
- Starring: Mary Glynne
- Cinematography: Hal Young
- Distributed by: Famous Players–Lasky British Producers
- Release date: 13 March 1921
- Running time: 39 minutes
- Country: United Kingdom
- Language: Silent with English intertitles

The Call of Youth is a 1921 British short romance film directed by Hugh Ford. Alfred Hitchcock is credited as a title designer. The film is now lost. It was made at Islington Studios by the British subsidiary of the American company Famous Players–Lasky.

== Cast ==
- Mary Glynne as Betty Overton
- Marjorie Hume as Joan Lawton
- Jack Hobbs as Hubert Richmond
- Malcolm Cherry as James Agar
- Ben Webster as Mark Lawton
- Gertrude Sterroll as Mrs. Lawton
- Victor Humphrey as Peter Hoskins
- John Peachey as Dr. Michaelson
- Ralph Foster as Minister

== See also ==
- Alfred Hitchcock filmography
