= Salomé (1923 film) =

1922 film by Charles Bryant and Alla Nazimova

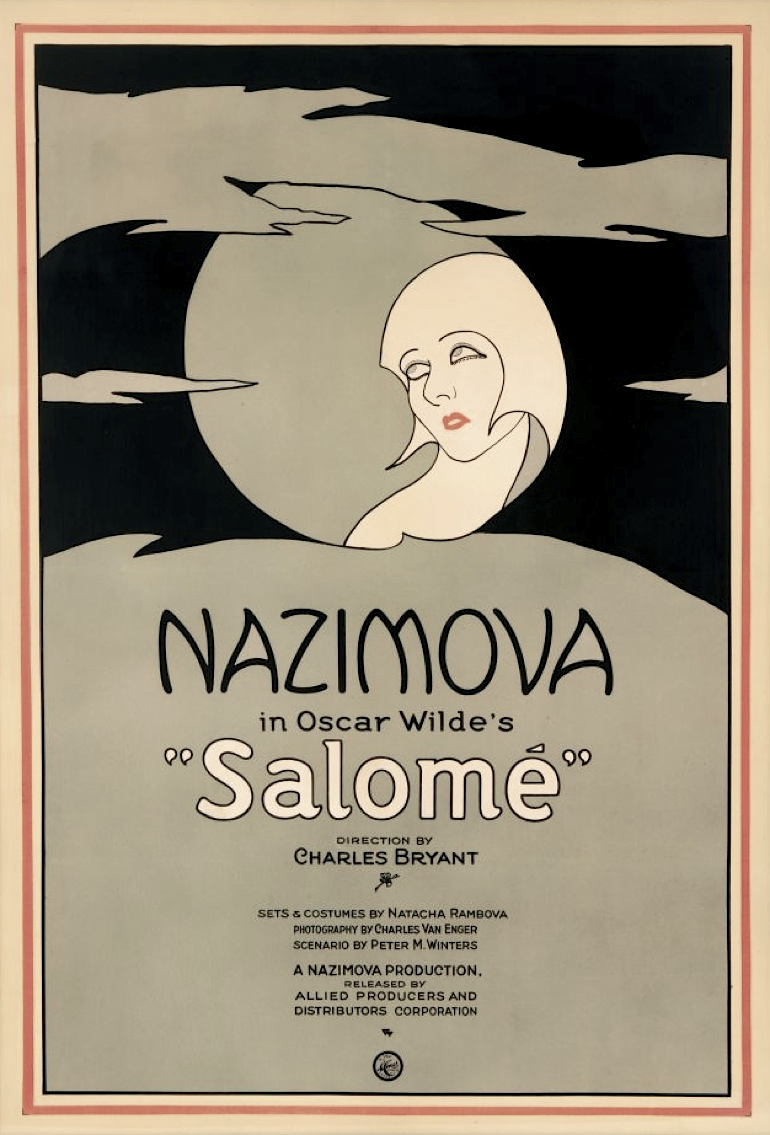
- Poster
- Directed by: Charles Bryant and Alla Nazimova
- Written by: Peter M. Winters (pseudonym for Alla Nazimova)
- Based on: Salome; 1891 play by Oscar Wilde
- Produced by: Alla Nazimova
- Starring: Alla Nazimova; Mitchell Lewis; Rose Dione; Earl Schenck; Arthur Jasmine; Nigel De Brulier; Frederick Peters; Louis Dumar
- Cinematography: Charles Van Enger
- Production company: Nazimova Productions
- Distributed by: Allied Artists Pictures Corporation
- Release date: 1922
- Running time: 74 minutes
- Country: United States
- Language: Silent (English intertitles)
- Budget: $350,000 – $400,000

Salomé is a 1922 American silent drama film directed by Charles Bryant. The film stars Alla Nazimova, Mitchell Lewis, Rose Dione, Earl Schenck, Arthur Jasmine, Nigel De Brulier, Frederick Peters and Louis Dumar.

It is an adaptation of the 1891 Oscar Wilde play of the same name. The play itself is a loose retelling of the biblical story of King Herod and his execution of John the Baptist at the request of Herod's stepdaughter, Salomé, whom he lusts after. The film has often been cited as one of the first art films of the United States, and has also been described as a cult classic of queer cinema.

== Plot ==
The full film

The film starts by giving context for the banquet that is about to unfold. The Tetrarch is said to have murdered his brother to obtain the throne and for access to his brother's (now his) wife and daughter. At some point after this coup, Jokanaan arrived from the desert and prophesizes the coming birth of Christ. He reveals the infidelity of Herodias, the Tetrarch's wife. With his wife furious, the Tetrarch locks Jokanaan away to protect him from great mobs.

Salomé, daughter of Herodias, is described as "... An uncontaminated blossom in a wilderness of evil", but despite this, is known as a girl who is unafraid to kill and does it as a form of affection". A new scene opens at Herod's palace, where the Tetrarch displays his intense obsession with Salome, his stepdaughter and niece, thus angering Herodias. Salomé leaves this and enters the courtyard from the banquet hall. She charms a young guard to allow her to see Jokanaan.

He is brought up from his prison below. Salomé displays a deep obsession for the Prophet. After he ignores her affections, she expresses her intent to kiss him. The young guard Salomé had previously charmed takes a blade to his own chest. Unmoved by this, Salomé continues to pester Jokanaan, causing him to retreat back to his prison. This infuriates Salomé, and she waits just outside his cell door. Seeking his stepdaughter, the Tetrarch stumbles out into the courtyard and finds the body of the young guard. He is horrified, as he did not order for anyone to be killed.

After the initial horror subsides, the Tetrarch orders the banquet to be served outside, so Salomé is visible while he eats. He begs her to join and dance for him and his guests, promising anything she desires. Salomé realizes she can use this to kill the man she loves, Jokanaan. She knows her stepfather would keep him removed in his cage otherwise, and her mother also despises him.

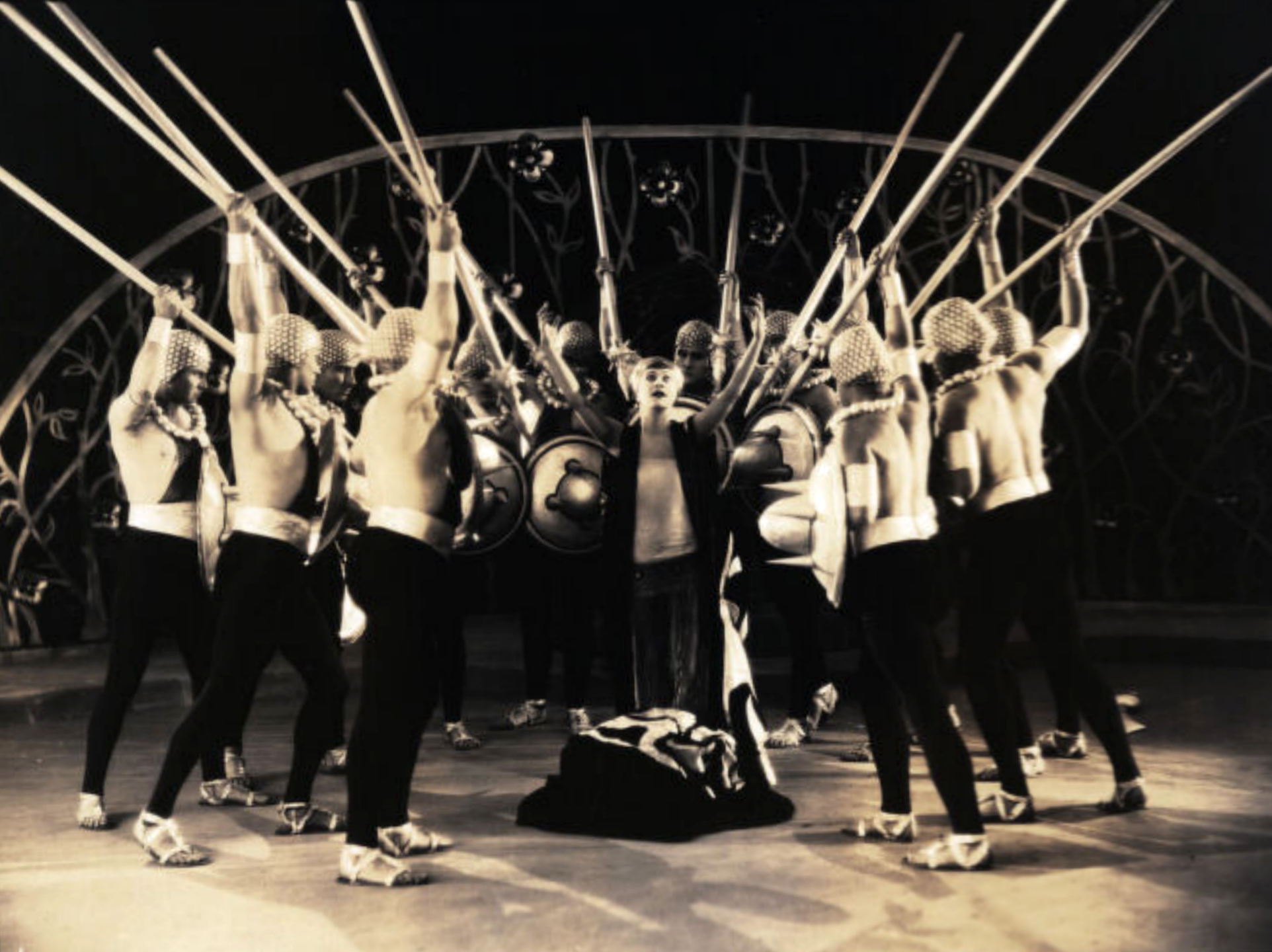
Death scene with spears

Salomé performs The Dance of the Seven Veils, which greatly pleases The Tetrarch. In return, Salomé asks for Jokanaan's head to be delivered to her on a silver platter. The Tetrarch is horrified by this request and offers multiple alternatives. Cheered on by her mother, Salomé insists on the head of Jokanaan. When delivered the head, Salomé hides it under her long train and kisses it, which she had desired from their first meeting. Seeing this, the Tetrarch orders the execution of Salomé. Guards rush her with spears.

The final title card shows the words:

The Mystery Of Love Is Greater Than The Mystery Of Death.

== Cast ==
- Alla Nazimova as Salomé, Stepdaughter of Herod
- Mitchell Lewis as Herod Antipas, Tetrarch of Judea
- Rose Dione as Herodias, wife of Herod
- Earl Schenck as Narraboth, Captain of the Guard
- Arthur Jasmine as Page of Herodias
- Nigel De Brulier as Jokanaan, the Prophet
- Frederick Peters as Naaman, the Executioner
- Louis Dumar as Tigellinus

== Background and production ==
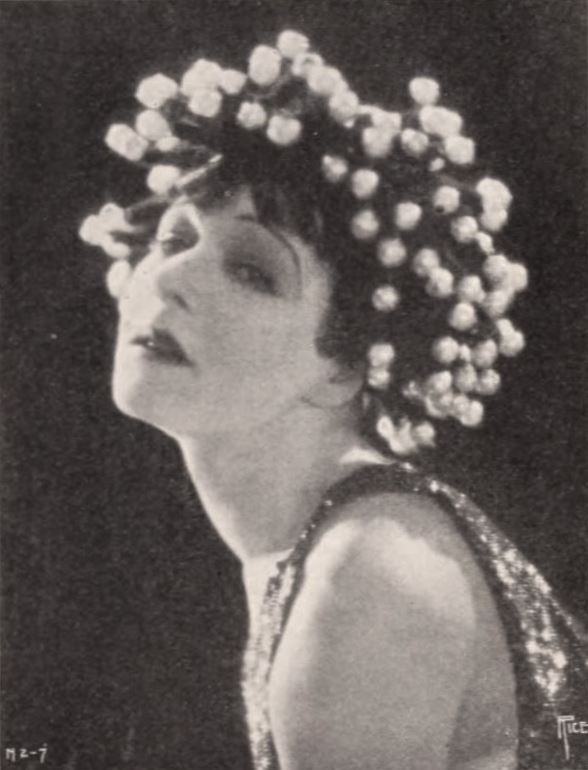
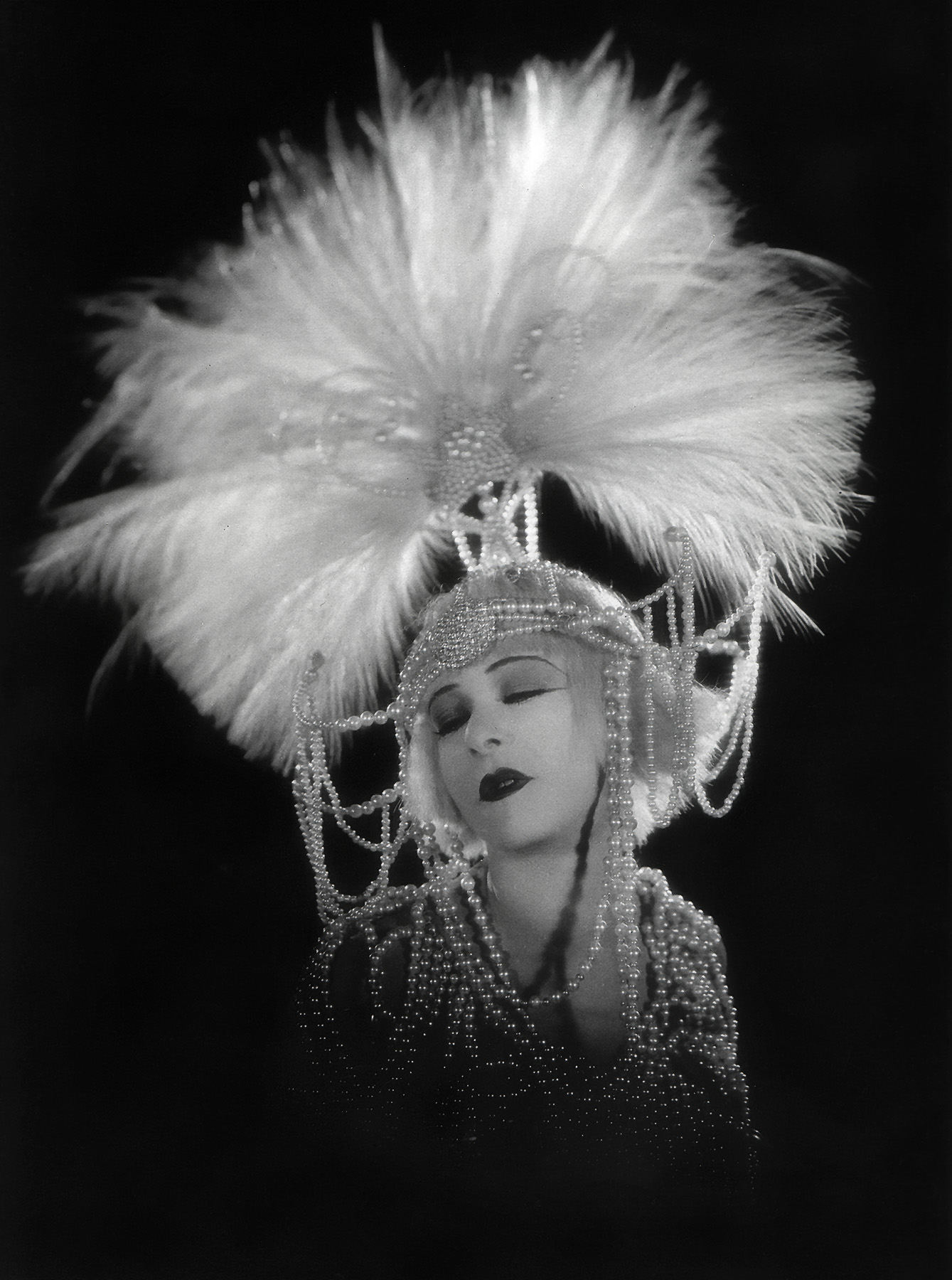
Nazimova wearing two elaborate headdresses in the film created by Natacha Rambova.

Nazimova financed the project herself at a cost of $350,000 to $400,000, and initially had difficulty finding a distributor for the film. The screenplay is credited to Peter M. Winters, which was a pseudonym for Nazimova The film was shot during January and February 1922. Nazimova's Salomé would be the first full-scale production of Wilde's play by a woman.

Nazimova hired set designer Natacha Rambova, who was reportedly Nazimova's sometime lover and wife of Rudolph Valentino, to create the costumes for the film, with both women citing Aubrey Beardsley as an inspiration for the elaborate costumes. Rambova insisted that all the fabric for the costumes be imported from Maison Lewis in Paris. In an interview with Picture-Play Magazine about the film's pre-production, Nazimova stated:

Before I began the picture, I collected every picture of Salome that could be found, pictures of other actresses and singers, portraits, reproductions of old masters, and sculptured likenesses—anything that stood for Salome. I had a scrapbook chock full. The general version of Salome seemed to be a mature woman with large hips and prominent busts. I didn't care for the usual thing, I am not fat, you see, and yet I wanted to play the part. The conventional costume did not appeal to me. You know? A few beads? The inverted ash trays in lieu of breastplates? No! Not for Nazimova! I believed that the Wilde Salome had to be treated, in costume imaginatively, just as Beardsley treated the character in his marvelous illustrations.

Nazimova, who was forty-two at the time the film was made, insisted on depicting the princess as a fourteen-year-old adolescent. Film photographer Charles Van Enger used subtle control of lighting to help mask her age, and Rambova designed special costumes to make Nazimova appear thinner and younger, which were effective in medium and long-range shots of the actress. For her provocative dance of the seven veils, Rambova used "a sheath-like tunic of white satin, with a rubber lining (specially made by a manufacturer of automobile tires) that clung to her body."

Paul Ivano, the assistant cinematographer, recalled that the lighting effects, especially for the court scenes and the Shadow of Death sequence were time consuming. He went on to say that "several times when we were shooting big scenes, we stayed in the studio until four o'clock in the morning and returned at nine. The nights were cold, many of the actors semi-naked, and a system of fifteen immense electric stoves was improvised to heat the entire stage."

Multiple sources have stated that the film's cast is composed entirely of gay or bisexual actors in an homage to Oscar Wilde. According to queer film historian Vito Russo, censors "were horrified" with the film, and ordered the elimination of several scenes, one which included a homosexual relationship between two Syrian soldiers. The examiner from the New York State Censorship Board wrote in their report "this picture is in no way religious in theme or interpretation. In my judgment, it is a story of depravity and immorality made worse because of its biblical background. Sacrilegious."

== Release ==
When Allied Artists Pictures Corporation, the film's distributor, refused to set a release date for the film, Ivano suggested Nazimova screen it for some film critics. One of the first screenings reported was on July 12, 1922, at The Town Hall in New York City. It was a private showing for members of the National Board of Review and their guests, and for "especially invited personages celebrated in the artistic and social world of the city." Motion Picture News wrote that "the photoplay, following exactly neither the original legend of Salomé nor Oscar Wilde's interpretive revision of it, yet admittedly inspired by both, was pronounced, judging from the freely expressed informal comment upon it by members of the audience, to be the most splendidly effective picture in which Nazimova has yet appeared, and it was generally predicted that Salomé will be one of the outstanding triumphs of the year on the screen."

Subsequent screenings for critics in 1922 included, Robert E. Sherwood of Life Magazine, who wrote: "The persons responsible for Salome deserve the whole-souled gratitude of everyone who believes in the possibilities of the movie as an art." Alan Dale of New York American opined that: "Nazimova is witheringly unusual. This is the very apex of her harrowing originality." Thomas Craven of The New Republic was not impressed, stating: "Degrading and unintelligent. Nazimova has attempted a part for which she has no qualifications. Try as she will, she cannot be seductive."

Nazimova and her husband also screened the film in 1922 in Venice, California, where they requested the proprietor of a movie theatre there to run it unannounced. They were anxious to ascertain its effect upon an average audience. As the patrons left the theatre, blank slips of paper were handed out to them, asking for their opinion of the film. Nazimova recalled that all but nine were enthusiastic in their praise of the picture, with eight of those nine being unfavorable, and one man wrote "rotten".

Allied eventually distributed the film in February 1923. However, the film had already been released in December 1922, in New York at the Criterion Theatre, and in Texas. Life Magazine and The New Republic reported that the film had been released to the public in January 1923. The movie ended up being a box-office flop; and effectively ended Nazimova's immediate career. She retired in 1925 and remained absent from films until 1940.

=== Home media ===
In 2003, Salomé became available on DVD as a double feature with the avant garde film Lot in Sodom (1933) by James Sibley Watson and Melville Webber. In November 2018, Kino Lorber included a digitally restored version in the Pioneers: First Women Filmmakers box set.

== Critical reception ==
=== Contemporaneous reviews (1922) ===
Film critic Laurence Reid opined "this is an ambitious effort — taking Oscar Wilde's tragedy and attempting to make screen entertainment from it. The picture may appeal to one's artistic sense but it offers no entertainment and won't be a sell-out for the exhibitor. In the first place it is too arty — too far over the heads of the everyday patrons, the majority of whom will wonder why it has been screened at all. In the second place it travels on one key which is not received by any variety of scenes or conversation. There is only one setting, the background of which has been blackened out, and the foreground containing a banquet table and a representation of marble columns, which, while simple and artistic in design, would be far more effective if Wilde's beautiful words were audibly expressed."

A reviewer for Screenland described the film as "a painting deftly stroked upon the silversheet" and that "poets and dreamers will find imaginative delights in the weird settings and the still more weird acting, depressing at times to ordinary folks. And it is worth something to watch Nazimova balance her Christmas-tree headdress!" Photoplay commented that "the action of the film adaptation has all the speed of a slow motion reel; that is, all but the Dance of the Seven Veils; we are not sure whether we like Madame Nazimova's idea of Salome as a petulant little princess with a Freudian complex and a headdress of glass bubbles. We rather believe such a Salome would not have stirred men so in those good old pagan days. You have our warning: this is bizarre stuff."

=== Modern reviews ===
The gay and lesbian undertones to the film are so strong that one is tempted to describe it as a 'limp-wristed production'. One title introducing 'Greeks with painted eyes and painted cheeks' is followed by a shot of three very camp-looking, aged Hollywood queens, perhaps the most outrageous moment in a film full of flagrant homosexuality.

— Anthony Slide, (1996)

Film researcher Daniel Eagan wrote that while "her age is evident in a few shots, she is remarkably persuasive as a spoiled, petulant teen only dimly aware of the violence and danger around her; Nazimova's eyes are magnetic, and her gestures — in particular, her facial expressions — almost always make psychological sense; she moves her body with the precision of a dancer, and uses her understanding of how the camera operates to simply overpower her fellow performers."

Author Martin Turnbull opined that "when seen through 21st century eyes, Salomé is a phantasmagoria of striking images, unbridled sensuality, and fearless storytelling. It also leaves the viewer with the lingering sense that if Nazimova had the good fortune to come along a hundred years later than she did, she’d have found a world with its arms thrust wide open to embrace the groundbreaking artist that she was."

== Legacy ==
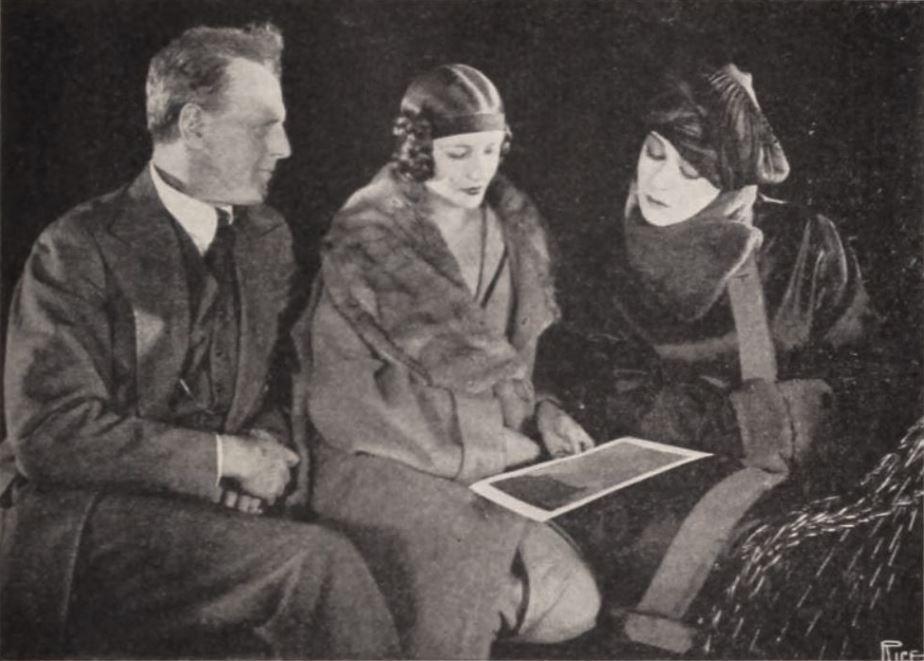
Charles Bryant, Natacha Rambova, and Alla Nazimova

On December 28, 2000, Librarian of Congress James H. Billington selected the film for preservation in the United States National Film Registry as being "culturally, historically, or aesthetically significant". It has also been preserved at the Museum of Modern Art in New York City, with a musical score played on an organ by Richard Strauss. The film was nominated in 2001 by the American Film Institute for AFI's 100 Years...100 Passions.

Film historian Martin Girod observed that for a long time, Nazimova's films were considered obsolete and largely forgotten because their distinct, artificial style stood in stark contrast to the later standards of Hollywood; many film history books don't even acknowledge her work. In recent years, however, Salomé has been celebrated as a queer cult film. The film has frequently been cited as one of the first art films in the United States., and has also been described as a cult classic of queer cinema.

== See also ==
- Lot in Sodom
- List of American films of 1922
- List of American films of 1923
- List of LGBTQ-related films of the 1920s
- List of films in the public domain in the United States
