= The Infamous Miss Revell =

1921 film

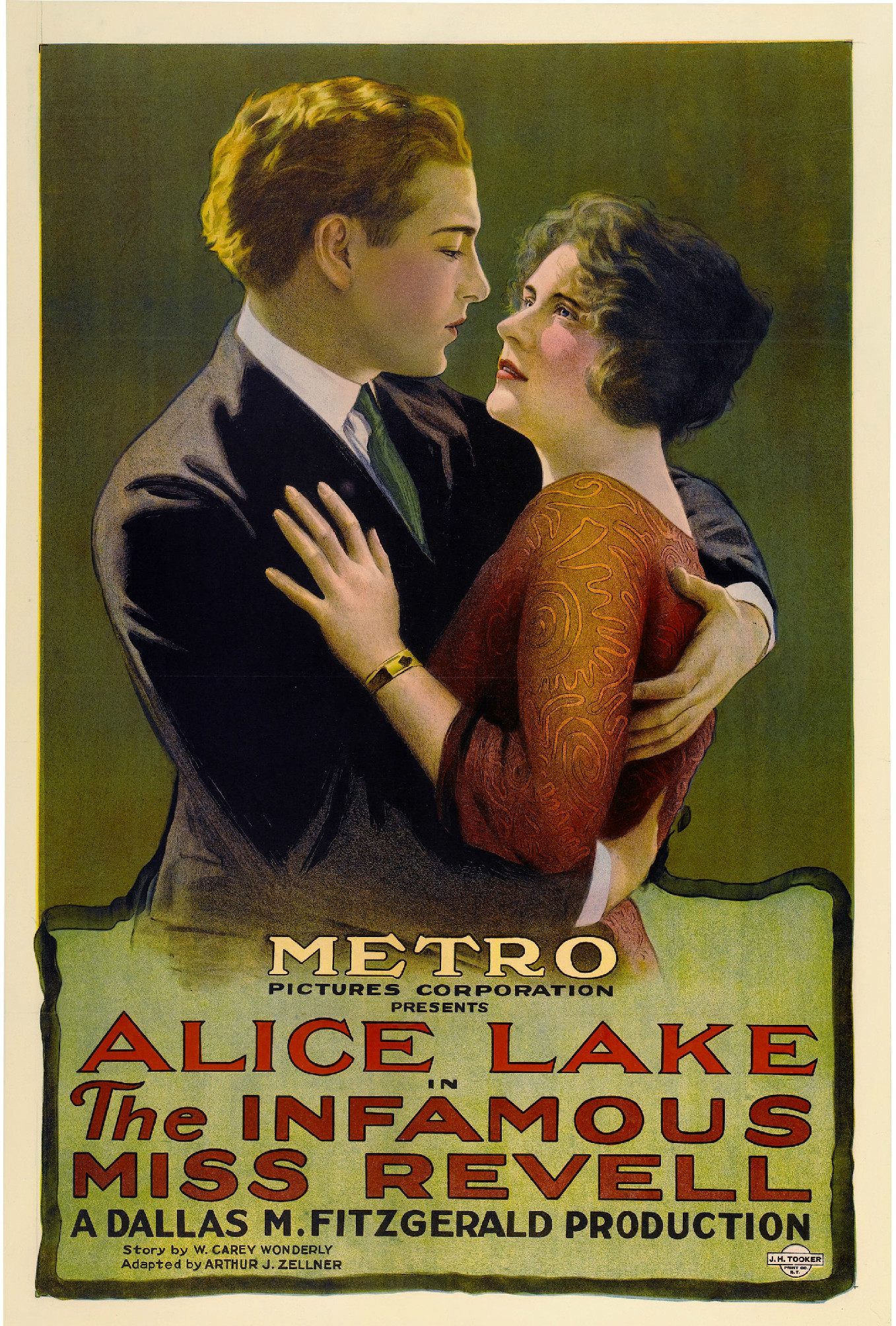
- Directed by: Dallas M. Fitzgerald
- Written by: Arthur J. Zellner
- Based on: short story The Infamous Miss Revell by William Carey Wonderly
- Produced by: Metro Pictures
- Starring: Alice Lake
- Cinematography: Roy H. Klaffki
- Distributed by: Metro Pictures
- Release date: October 17, 1921
- Running time: 6 reels
- Country: United States
- Language: Silent (English intertitles)

The Infamous Miss Revell is a lost 1921 American silent mystery film directed by Dallas M. Fitzgerald and starring Alice Lake. It was produced and released by Metro Pictures.

== Cast ==
- Alice Lake as Julien Revell/Paula Revell
- Cullen Landis as Max Hildreth
- Jackie Saunders as Lillian Hildreth
- Lydia Knott as Mary Hildreth
- Herbert Standing as Samuel Pangborn
- Alfred Hollingsworth as Maxwell Putnam
- Stanley Goethals as Revell Child
- Francis Carpenter as Revell Child
- Mae Giraci as Revell Child (credited as May Giraci)
- Geraldine Condon as Revell Child
