= Douglas Walton (actor) =

Canadian-American actor (1909–1961)

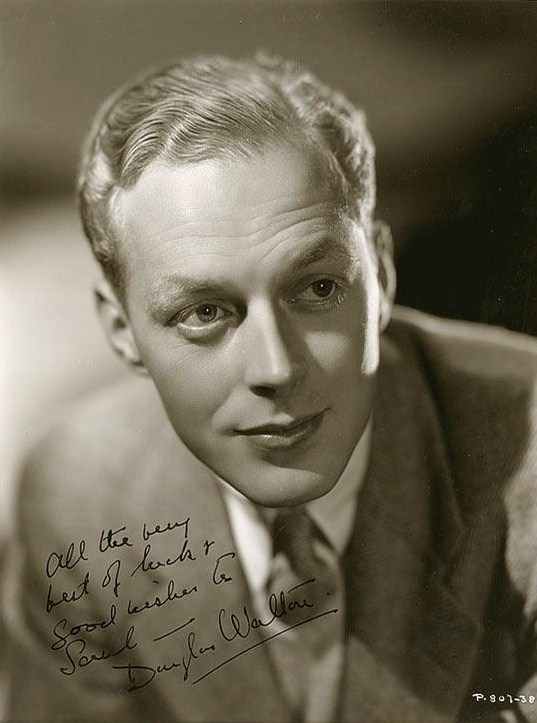
- Publicity Still of Douglas Walton, 1939
- Born: John Douglas Duder; October 17, 1909; Toronto, Ontario, Canada
- Died: November 15, 1961 (aged 52); New York City, U.S.
- Occupation: Actor
- Years active: 1931–1950
- Spouses: Florence M. Barnett (m. 1934, divorced) Vee W. Roberts (m. 1943, divorced) Huguette Suzanne Marie Philomene Boudet (m. 1950)

Douglas Walton (born John Douglas Duder; October 17, 1909 – November 15, 1961) was a Canadian-born American actor who worked in American films during the 1930s and 1940s. He appeared in 60 films between 1931 and 1950.

== Life and career ==
Born in Toronto, Ontario, Canada on October 17, 1909, Walton began his acting career in the theatres of Chicago and New York City. Tall, blond and elegant, Walton played many aristocratic, intellectual or sophisticated English or European men in films such as The Count of Monte Cristo in 1934; Bride of Frankenstein (1935), in which Walton memorably played the English poet Percy Bysshe Shelley in the film's prologue; the Clark Gable version of Mutiny on the Bounty (1935); and director John Ford's Mary of Scotland (1936) starring Katharine Hepburn, in which Walton gave his perhaps best performance as the effeminate and cowardly "Lord Darnley". Ford directed Walton in The Lost Patrol (1934) and The Long Voyage Home (1940, starring John Wayne) as well. Walton also acted in Bad Lands, the 1939 Western remake of Ford's The Lost Patrol, directed by Lew Landers.

In 1939, Walton returned to New York to appear on Broadway in the comedy Billy Draws a Horse.

In the 1940s, Walton's parts were secondary characters or even uncredited roles in B-movies, or sometimes in high-profile films such as King Vidor's Northwest Passage (1940), starring Spencer Tracy, and The Picture of Dorian Gray (1945). One sizable role was "Percival Priceless" in Dick Tracy vs. Cueball (1947). His final film was Three Came Home (1950).

Walton retired in 1950 and died eleven years later, on November 17, 1961, from a heart attack, at age 52.

== Filmography ==
| Year | Title | Role | Notes |
|---|---|---|---|
| 1931 | Body and Soul | | Uncredited |
| 1931 | Always Goodbye | Party Gossip | Uncredited |
| 1931 | Over the Hill | Stephen | |
| 1931 | Dr. Jekyll and Mr. Hyde | Blond Student | Uncredited |
| 1932 | Scarface | Cesca's Boyfriend | Uncredited |
| 1933 | Cavalcade | Soldier Friend of Joe | Uncredited |
| 1933 | The Secret of Madame Blanche | Leonard Junior | |
| 1933 | Looking Forward | Willie Benton | |
| 1934 | Madame Spy | Karl | |
| 1934 | The Lost Patrol | Pearson | |
| 1934 | Murder in Trinidad | Gregory Bronson | |
| 1934 | Shock | Gilroy Hayworth | |
| 1934 | The Count of Monte Cristo | Albert | |
| 1934 | Charlie Chan in London | Hugh Gray | |
| 1935 | Captain Hurricane | Jimmy Howell | |
| 1935 | Bride of Frankenstein | Percy Bysshe Shelley | |
| 1935 | The Dark Angel | Roulston | Uncredited |
| 1935 | Mutiny on the Bounty | Stewart | |
| 1935 | Hitch Hike Lady | Alfred Bosworth Blake | Uncredited |
| 1936 | The Garden Murder Case | Floyd Garden | |
| 1936 | I Conquer the Sea! | Leonard Ashley | |
| 1936 | Mary of Scotland | Lord Darnley | |
| 1936 | Thank You, Jeeves! | Edward McDermott | |
| 1936 | Camille | Henri | Uncredited |
| 1937 | Damaged Goods | George Dupont | |
| 1937 | Flight from Glory | Garth Hilton | |
| 1937 | Nation Aflame | Tommy Franklin | |
| 1937 | Wallaby Jim of the Islands | Norman Brooks | |
| 1938 | Storm Over Bengal | Terry | |
| 1939 | Pacific Liner | Engineering Officer Bates | Uncredited |
| 1939 | The Story of Vernon and Irene Castle | Student Pilot | |
| 1939 | The Sun Never Sets | Carpenter | |
| 1939 | Bad Lands | Bob Mulford | |
| 1939 | Raffles | Bunny Manders | |
| 1940 | Northwest Passage | Lieutenant Avery | |
| 1940 | Too Many Girls | Beverly Waverly | |
| 1940 | The Long Voyage Home | Second Mate | |
| 1940 | The Letter | Well Wisher | Uncredited |
| 1941 | Singapore Woman | Roy Bennett | |
| 1941 | One Night in Lisbon | Frank | Uncredited |
| 1941 | Hurry, Charlie, Hurry | Michael Prescott | |
| 1942 | Jesse James, Jr. | Archie McDonald | |
| 1942 | Desperate Journey | British Officer Playing Dice | Uncredited |
| 1944 | Murder, My Sweet | Lindsay Marriott | |
| 1945 | Bring On the Girls | Edgar | Uncredited |
| 1945 | The Picture of Dorian Gray | Allen Campbell | |
| 1945 | Kitty | Philip | Uncredited |
| 1946 | Our Hearts Were Growing Up | Terence Marlowe | Uncredited |
| 1946 | Cloak and Dagger | British Pilot | Uncredited |
| 1946 | Dick Tracy vs. Cueball | Percival Priceless | |
| 1947 | High Conquest | Hugo Bunning as a Young man | |
| 1947 | High Tide | Clinton Vaughn | |
| 1947 | Green Dolphin Street | Sir Charles Maloney | Uncredited |
| 1947 | Forever Amber | Fop | Uncredited |
| 1948 | Hills of Home | Minister | Uncredited |
| 1948 | Command Decision | Englishman on Loudspeaker | Voice, Uncredited |
| 1948 | Trouble Preferred | Slippy Patterson, Pickpocket | Uncredited |
| 1949 | The Secret of St. Ives | Allan St. Ives | |
| 1949 | Calamity Jane and Sam Bass | Bookmaker | Uncredited |
| 1950 | Three Came Home | Australian POW | Uncredited, (final film role) |

== Bibliography ==
- Curtis, James (1998). James Whale: A New World of Gods and Monsters. Boston, Faber and Faber. ISBN 0-571-19285-8.
