= Marie Wainwright =

American actress (1853–1923)

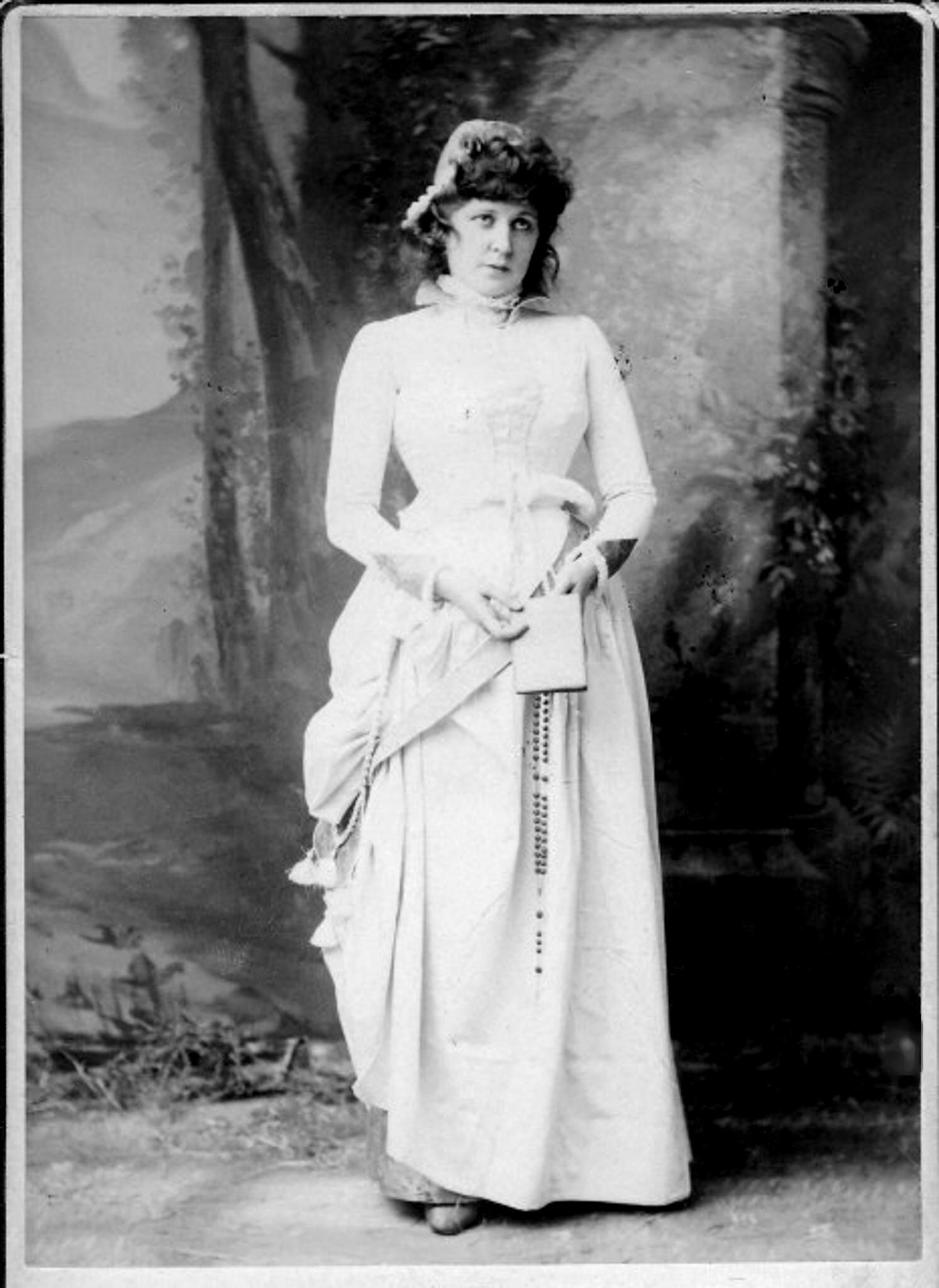
- Portrait by Napoleon Sarony
- Born: Marie Page Wainwright; May 8, 1853; Philadelphia, Pennsylvania
- Died: August 17, 1923 (aged 70); Scranton, Pennsylvania
- Occupation: actress
- Years active: 1877-1921
- Spouse(s): Winston Henry Slaughter(d. 1882). Franklyn Roberts(d. 1907), Louis James
- Parent(s): Commodore J.M. Wainwright; Maria(Page)Wainwright

Marie Wainwright (May 8, 1853 – August 17, 1923) was an American stage and sometimes screen actress. She achieved the bulk of her fame on the Victorian stage. Her parents were Commodore J.M. Wainwright and Maria Wainwright (nee Page). She was educated in France and made her first stage appearance in 1877 in Romeo and Juliet. She later was leading lady for Edwin Booth, Lawrence Barrett and Tommaso Salvini. She acted in the classics and high drama until the turn of the century, then began appearing in more contemporary plays. Later in life she made an attempt at silent film acting, making just three films. She died in Scranton Pennsylvania in 1923.

== Selected filmography ==
- Social Hypocrites (1918), as Maria, Duchess of St. Keverne
- Secret Strings (1918), as Mrs. de Giles
- Polly With a Past (1920), as Mrs. Van Zile
