= Florence Hein =

American screenwriter

- Born: February 2, 1880; Aberdeen, Scotland
- Died: April 22, 1953 (aged 73); Los Angeles, California, USA
- Occupation: Screenwriter

Florence Hein (February 2, 1880 – April 22, 1953) was a Scottish-born American screenwriter in the silent film era, and later worked as actress Pola Negri's personal secretary.

== Early life ==
Florence was born in Aberdeen, Scotland, to Gustav Hein and Laura Hyde. Her father taught German at a girls' high school in Aberdeen. and was a member of the Aberdeen Philosophical Society. The Hein family immigrated to the United States when Florence was a girl.

== Career ==
Hein was a screenwriter in the silent film era. She worked in Hollywood at Metro Pictures in the early to mid-1920s. Her first film, The Golden Gift (1922), was directed by Maxwell Karger and starred Alice Lake. She was also announced as scenarist for an Elliott Dexter film titled The Man Who Forgave, in 1923. By 1925 she was private secretary to actress Pola Negri. She attended Rudolph Valentino's funeral with Negri in 1926.

== Selected filmography ==
- By Divine Right (1924)
- The Scarlet Lily (1923)
- Refuge (1923)
- The Golden Gift (1922)

== Personal life ==
Hein died in Los Angeles in 1953, aged 73 years.
