= Bad Lands (1939 film) =

1939 film by Lew Landers

- Theatrical release poster
- Directed by: Lew Landers
- Written by: Clarence Upson Young
- Based on: The Lost Patrol; 1934 film by John Ford
- Produced by: Robert Sisk
- Starring: Robert Barrat; Noah Beery Jr. Guinn 'Big Boy' Williams
- Cinematography: Russell Metty; Frank Redman
- Edited by: George Hively
- Music by: Roy Webb
- Distributed by: RKO Radio Pictures
- Release date: August 28, 1939
- Running time: 70 minutes
- Country: United States
- Language: English
- Budget: $84,000
- Box office: $141,000

Bad Lands is a 1939 Western film directed by Lew Landers. Bad Lands is a remake of John Ford's The Lost Patrol, with the locale changed from the Mesopotamian to the Arizona desert.

== Plot ==
In 1875, a posse headed by sheriff Sheriff Bill Cummings is held at bay by Apache warriors. The posse members are picked off, one by one, until only the Sheriff is left.

== Cast ==
- Robert Barrat as Sheriff Bill Cummings
- Noah Beery Jr. as Chick Lyman
- Guinn 'Big Boy' Williams as Billy Sweet
- Andy Clyde as Cluff
- Paul Hurst as Curly Tom
- Robert Coote as Eaton
- Addison Richards as Rayburn
- Douglas Walton as Bob Mulford
- Francis Ford as Charlie Garth
- Francis McDonald as Manuel Lopez

== Reception ==
According to the RKO records the film had a loss of $6,000.
