= The Silent Master =

1917 film

- Directed by: Léonce Perret
- Written by: Léonce Perret (scenario)
- Based on: The Court of St. Simon by E. Phillips Oppenheim
- Starring: Robert Warwick
- Production company: Robert Warwick Film
- Distributed by: Selznick Distributing Corporation
- Release date: June 1917
- Country: United States
- Language: Silent (English intertitles)

The Silent Master is a 1917 American drama film directed by Léonce Perret and starring Robert Warwick. The film is an adaptation of The Court of St. Simon by E. Phillips Oppenheim.

== Plot ==
A young Parisian dancer witnesses the ruin of a man's life due to betrayal.

== Cast ==
- Robert Warwick as Valentin, Marquis de Sombreuil, or Monsieur Simon
- Olive Tell as Virginia Arlen
- Donald Gallaher as Eugene de Presles
- Anna Little as Jacqueline
- Juliette Moore as Juliette
- Henri Valbel as Robert
- Valentine Petit as Mrs. Carlingford
- George Clarke as Mr. Carlingford
- Juliette Moore as Juliette

== Preservation ==
It's now a lost film.

== Reception ==
A critic for Moving Picture World wrote, "The production is well made and is of a distinctively melodramatic type."
