= Refuge (1923 film) =

1923 film by Victor Schertzinger

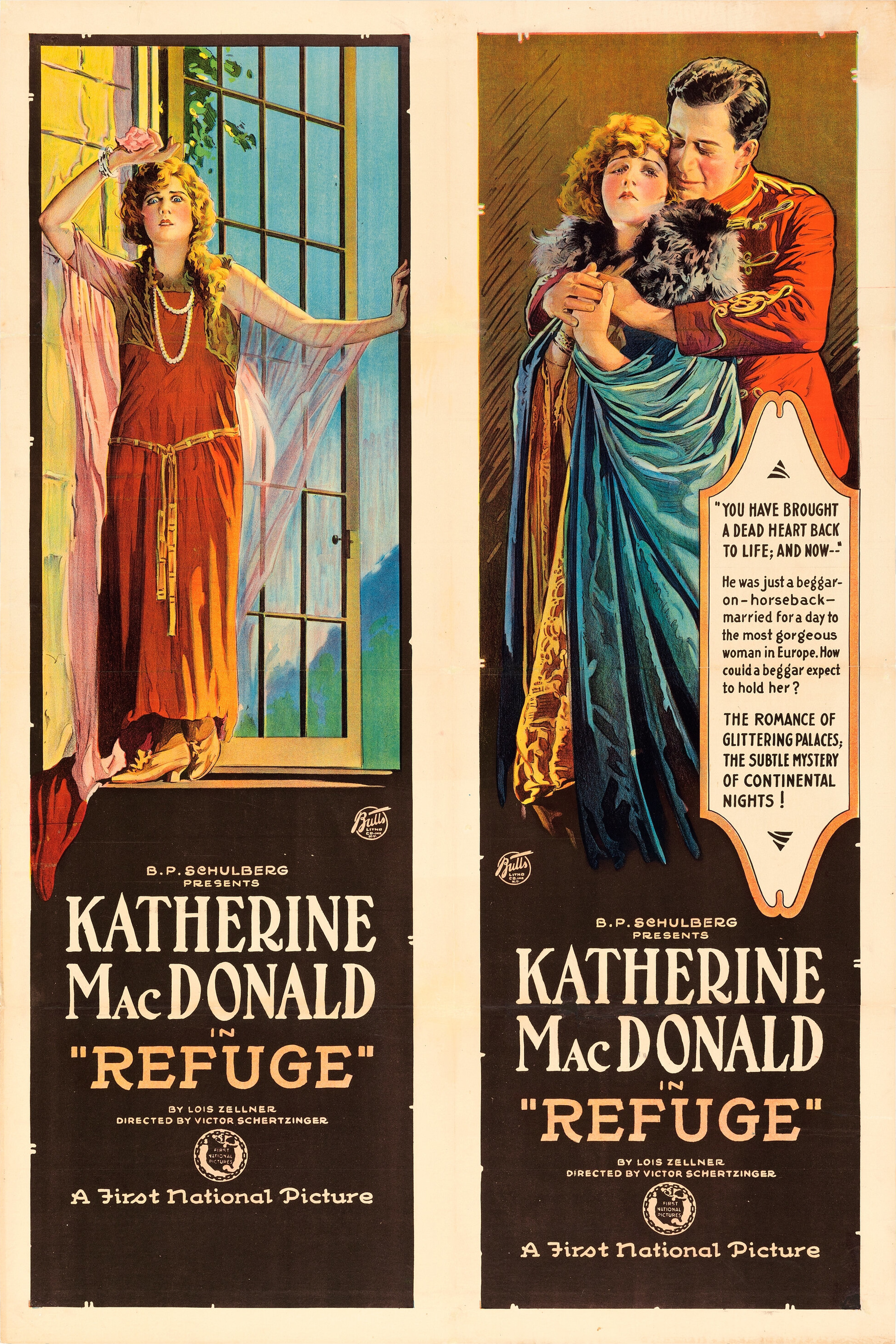
- Double image poster
- Directed by: Victor Schertzinger
- Written by: Florence Hein; Lois Zellner
- Produced by: B.P. Schulberg
- Starring: Katherine MacDonald; Hugh Thompson; J. Gunnis Davis
- Cinematography: Ernest Miller; Joseph Brotherton
- Edited by: Eve Unsell
- Production company: Preferred Pictures
- Distributed by: First National Pictures
- Release date: March 12, 1923
- Running time: 6 reels
- Country: United States
- Languages: Silent; English intertitles

Refuge is a 1923 American silent drama film directed by Victor Schertzinger and starring Katherine MacDonald, Hugh Thompson and J. Gunnis Davis.

== Cast ==
- Katherine MacDonald as Nadia
- Hugh Thompson as Gene
- J. Gunnis Davis as Dick
- J. Gordon Russell as Louis
- Eric Mayne as General De Rannier
- Arthur Edmund Carewe as Prince Ferdinand
- Mathilde Brundage as Madame De Rannier
- Fred Malatesta as Gustav Kenski
- Grace Morse as Marie
- Victor Potel as Alphpmse
- Elita Proctor Otis as The Princess

== Preservation ==
The film is now lost.

== Bibliography ==
- James Robert Parish & Michael R. Pitts. Film directors: a guide to their American films. Scarecrow Press, 1974.
