= The Unforeseen (film) =

1917 film by John B. O'Brien

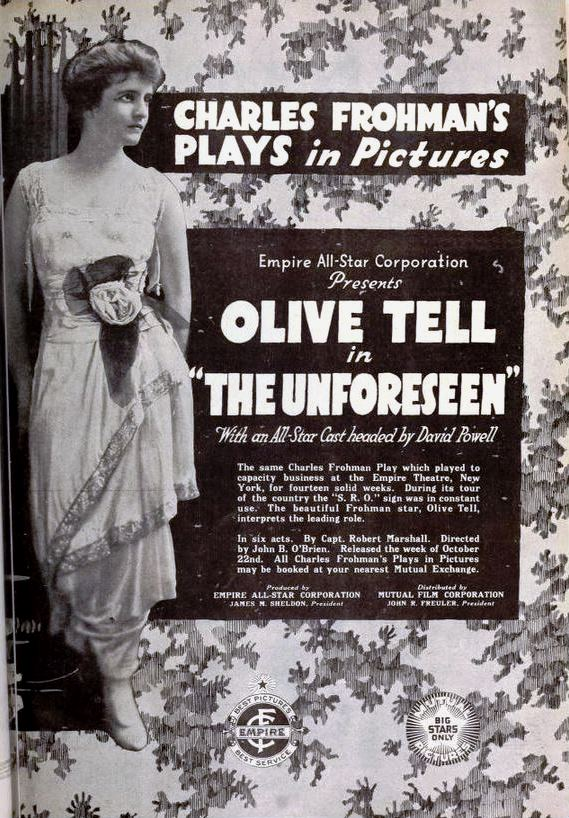
- Directed by: John B. O'Brien
- Written by: Charles E. Whittaker
- Based on: a play, The Unforeseen, by Robert Marshall c.1903
- Starring: Olive Tell; David Powell
- Cinematography: William Crolly; Frank Bangs; R. H. Kelly
- Production company: Empire All Star Corporation
- Distributed by: Mutual Film
- Release date: October 22, 1917
- Running time: 5-6 reels
- Country: USA
- Language: Silent with English titles

The Unforeseen is a lost 1917 American silent drama film directed by John B. O'Brien and starring Olive Tell and David Powell. Distributed by the Mutual Film Company, it is based on the 1903 Broadway play The Unforeseen by Robert Marshall, which originally ran at the Empire Theatre.

== Cast ==
- Olive Tell - Margaret Fielding
- David Powell - Walter Maxwell
- Lionel Adams - Captain Richard Haynes
- Fuller Mellish - Senator Fielding
- Eileen Dennes - Ethel Fielding
- Helen Courtney - Maxwell's secretary
- Warburton Gamble - Henry Traquair
