= Eve Unsell =

American screenwriter

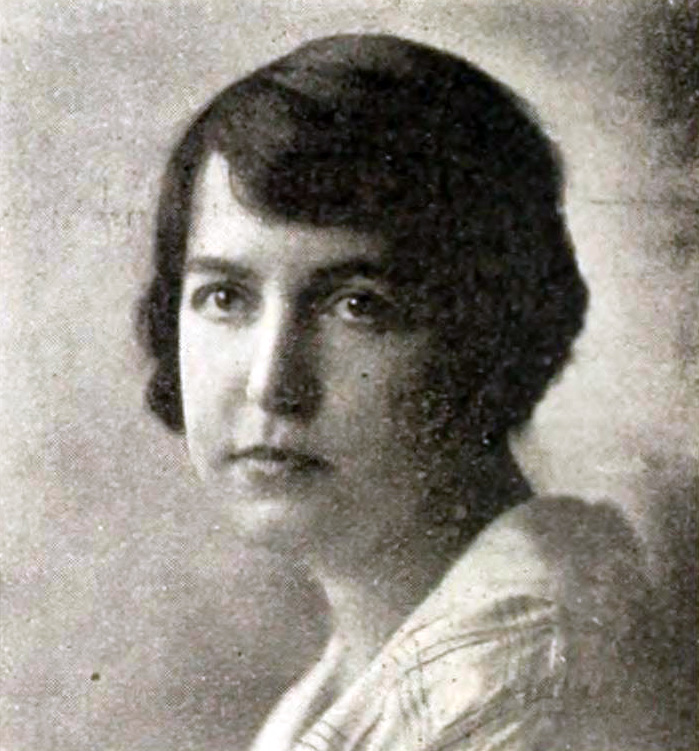
- In 1916
- Born: December 6, 1879; Chicago, Illinois, USA
- Died: July 6, 1937 (aged 57); Hollywood, California, USA
- Occupation: Screenwriter
- Years active: 1914–1933

Eve Unsell (December 6, 1879 – July 6, 1937) was an American screenwriter. She wrote for more than 90 films between 1914 and 1933.

== Background ==
She was born in Chicago, Illinois, and died in Hollywood, California. Eve was an American scenarist who was known to also use the pseudonym Oliver W. Geoffreys as well as E.M. Unsell. Eve was married to a man named Lester Blankfield, but the year is disputed. Records list their marriage year as 1911, but it does not match up with other documentation.

Eve Unsell was a professional in her career as a scenarist, overcoming many challenges along the way. Eve wrote for over 96 films in her lifetime, and edited over ten. Some of her most famous screen writes turned into productions include Shadows (1922), The Ancient Mariner (1925), The Plastic Age (1925), and The Spirit of Youth (1929).

Although she was most famous for her work in scenario writing she can also be given credit as an adapter, company director, editor, play reader, screenwriter, theatre actress, and writer. She helped in the writing of many novels as long as editing many different pieces from literature to theatrical writing.

== Career ==
Unsell underwent training as a journalist and magazine writer for the Kansas City Post and graduated from Christian College in Columbia, Missouri. She attended Emerson College in Boston for her postgraduate year, studying literature and drama. The theatrical agent, Beatrice DeMille was so impressed with one of Unsell's short stories that she hired young Eve as a play reader for her theatrical company in New York. DeMille became a mentor to Eve, giving her the motivation she needed to further her career.

Beatrice's two son's Cecil and William, partnered with future theatre impresario David Belasco, later took over Beatrice's company, becoming mentors to Unsell as well. In the article, "The Rise Of The Continuity Writer," featured in Writer’s Monthly, Eve wrote of her mentors, "Masters of screen technique as the DeMille’s have realized the necessity for not only recruiting the eminent authors for screen ranks but for training young writers to become technicians of screen detail, for the purpose of successfully translating the ‘big ideas’ of the big authors in screen terms, and so, close on the heels of the plot itself."

This is where she learned plot construction, or what she liked to call it, plot ‘detecting’. Eve gained much experience under the DeMille's and David Blasco. Blasco, who cast her in the theatrical comedy Excuse Me, gave Unsell two years of on stage experience that would later help in her better understanding of acting and screen writing. It was not until 1913 that Unsell's hard work in screen writing paid off. That year Moving Picture World announced that she would sell several film scenarios to the Pathe Freres, and the Kalem Company, who decided to produce Unsell's scenario, The Pawnbroker’s Daughter.

Later that year Unsell signed a contract with Cecil DeMille and Jesse Lasky for what was then the Famous Players Film Company. The famous news headline "Eve Unsell Will Sail For England," announced that in 1916 Unsell was chosen to be scenario head of the Famous Players–Lasky British Producers Ltd. The company's aim was "to feature European locations and to produce the works of the greatest Continental writers."

Eve liked her office in London, describing it as "comfortable and cozy." However, her heart was in American Pictures. In an interview with Motion Pictures News she explains, "English audience is a very critical one. American pictures predominate and are well received." The most successful film written by Unsell in her time abroad was The Call of Youth (1921), a short romance film in which Alfred Hitchcock is credited as a title designer. After the movie was produced in 1921, Unsell moved back to New York to start her own company, Eve Unsell Photoplay Staff, Inc., the only company of its kind at the time headed by a woman.

Unsell was a feminist and in a time when women had little representation in media she made a point to make both her male and female roles equally important in screen writes and other written works. In an article "From the Studio Angle, The Development Of Screenwriters," written by Eve and featured in the Writer’s Monthly, she talks of her stance on men and women representation in screen writing and on screen roles. "There’s sex in writing," she explains. "Men are generally more successful in working out intricate plots, and supplying the broad sweeps of action, the masculine logic, and proper balance of the subject."

Women's roles tend to be different, however just as important. The women "successfully ‘doctor’ the scenarios, adding little touches that give that emotional values to the dramatic scenes, and the psychology of the character necessary for the ‘popular’ picture." Eve defends Eve illuminates how the roles of men and women are brought alive through screen writing and ultimately through pictures and art. The pride she takes in her work is evident through her emphasis on the importance of the storywriter. "Only the best stories are good enough for the film… the screen needs men and women of vision, to portray life at its best… the screen writer must learn the art of substituting action for words."

Eve Unsell is now one of the 202 women featured in the "Women Film Pioneers Project," an online database that "showcases women who worked behind-the-scenes in the silent film industry as directors, producers, editors, and more".

== Selected filmography ==
- The Man from Mexico (1914)
- The Second in Command (1915)
- The Crystal Gazer (1917)
- Her Silent Sacrifice (1917)
- Over There (1917)
- Madame Jealousy (1918)
- Sunshine Nan (1918)
- In Pursuit of Polly (1918)
- The Whirlpool (1918)
- His Parisian Wife (1919)
- Three Men and a Girl (1919)
- The Test of Honor (1919)
- The Trap (1919)
- The Great Shadow (1920)
- The Call of Youth (1921)
- Devotion (1921)
- The Great Day (1921)
- Silent Years (1921)
- A Private Scandal (1921)
- The Call of Home (1922)
- Five Days to Live (1922)
- French Heels (1922)
- Thorns and Orange Blossoms (1922)
- Captain Fly-by-Night (1922)
- Poor Men's Wives (1923)
- Long Live the King (1923)
- Chastity (1923)
- Refuge (1923)
- Are You a Failure? (1923)
- The Scarlet Lily (1923)
- The Hero (1923; with Barbara La Marr, uncredited)
- Shadows of Paris (1924)
- The Breath of Scandal (1924)
- Captain January (1924)
- The Triflers (1924)
- What Fools Men (1925)
- Percy (1925)
- The Golden Strain (1925)
- The Ancient Mariner (1925)
- The Lily (1926)
- Sandy (1926)
- Exclusive Rights (1926)
- The Yankee Señor (1926)
- The Spirit of Youth (1929)
- The Medicine Man (1930)
- Up Pops the Devil (1931)
- Forbidden Melody (1933)
