= The Trap (1919 film) =

1919 film by Frank Reicher

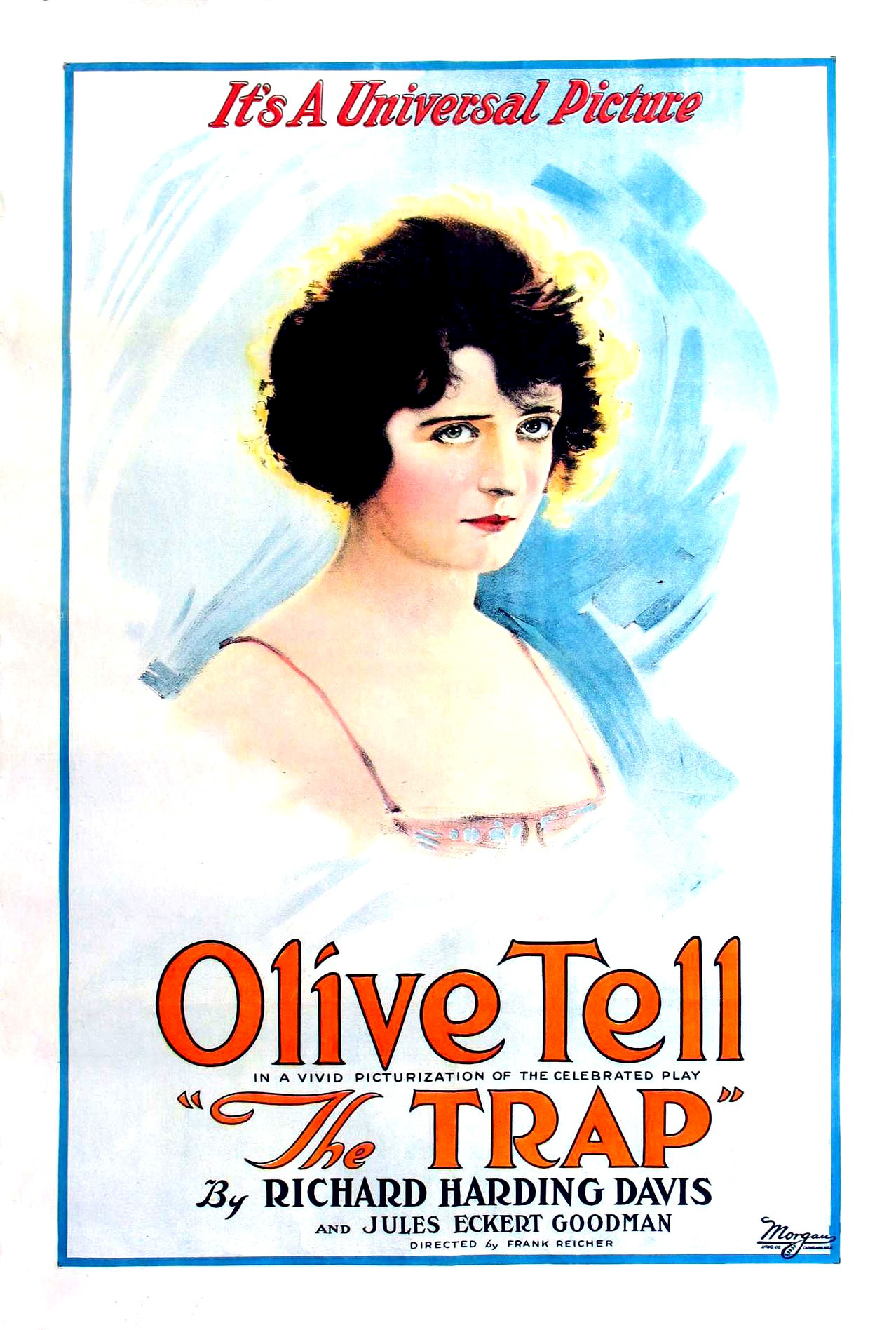
- Film poster
- Directed by: Frank Reicher
- Screenplay by: Eve Unsell
- Based on: The Trap; 1915 play by Richard Harding Davis; Jules Eckert Goodman
- Starring: Olive Tell
- Production company: Universal Film Manufacturing Company
- Distributed by: Universal Pictures
- Release date: August 11, 1919
- Running time: Six reels (60-70 minutes)
- Country: United States
- Language: Silent (English intertitles)

The Trap is a lost 1919 American silent drama film directed by Frank Reicher and starring Olive Tell. It was released in the United Kingdom under the title A Woman's Law. The film is based upon the 1915 play of the same name by Jules Eckert Goodman and Richard Harding Davis.

The Library of Congress includes the film among the National Film Preservation Board's list of "7,200 Lost U.S. Silent Feature Films" produced between 1912 and 1929.

== Plot ==
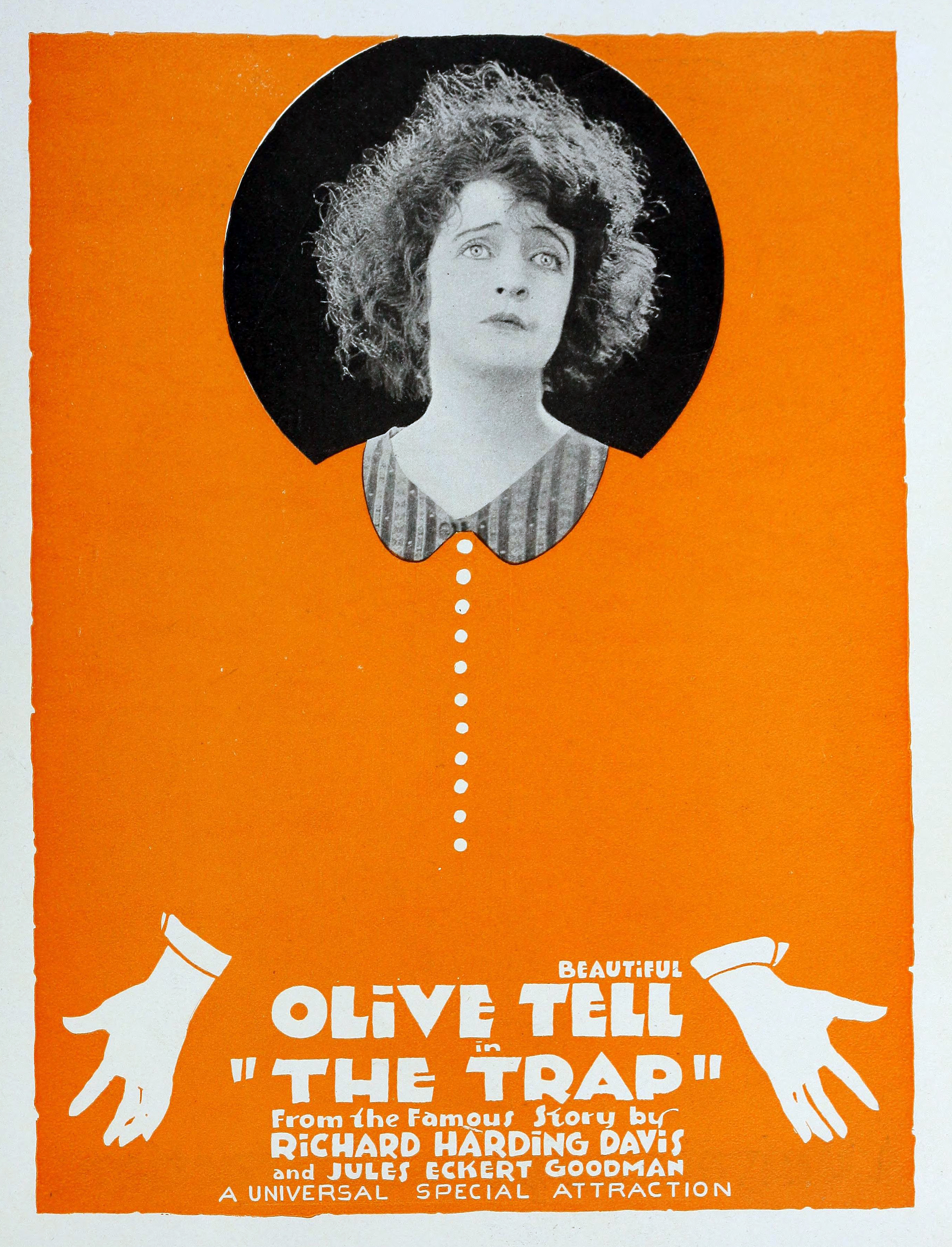
Advertisement in Motion Picture News

Based upon a summary in a film publication, Jean (Tell) teaches school at a settlement in Alaska and is loved by brothers Ned (Austin) and Steve Fallon (Schenck), whom Jean prefers. Ned and Jean's father Henry Carson go gold prospecting, while Steve spends his time gambling. Jean marries Steve in a ceremony witnessed by "Doc" Sloan (La Rocque). After Jean then becomes depressed by her husband's drunken ways, Steve boasts that he has a wife in Seattle, so she leaves. Jean's father returns having had no luck, but Ned returns having found a rich claim. Ned insists on deeding half of the claim to Jean as reward for her support, and professes to love her. She then confesses what happened with Steve. New York broker Bruce Graham (Mason) arrives on business and becomes infatuated with Jean. Word then comes that Jean's sister Helen in New York is ill, so Jean and her father leave, and Bruce accompanies them. Ned hears that his brother Steve was shot during a brawl in a nearby town.

In New York, Jean learns that Steve died in the fight. Jean and Bruce decide to marry, and Bruce refuses to let Jean tell him about her and Steve, saying no man should concern himself of his wife's previous life if he loves her. Years pass, and Jean is happy with two children while Ned has become successful with his mine and opened an office in New York. "Doc" Sloan under an alias has become acquainted with Helen (Bankhead), and at a party at the Graham home recognizes Jean as a woman he saw married in Alaska. He then attempts to blackmail her, saying that not only is Steve alive and that she is committing bigamy, but that he plans to tell her husband that the man she had an affair with is Ned. She goes to Ned, who tells her that he personally buried his brother Steve. Ned has a meeting with Sloan designed as a trap to get evidence of the blackmail, but Sloan pulls a gun on Ned. There is a gunshot, Sloan is dead, Ned picks up the gun and fires additional shots, including one into his own arm. Ned is arrested for the murder but says it was self-defense. When Bruce becomes suspicious of his wife due to the payments from Ned, Jean tells the whole story, including how it was she who shot Sloan at the meeting. Ned is later acquitted at trial.

== Cast ==
- Olive Tell as Jean Carson
- Sidney Mason as Bruce Graham
- Jere Austin as Ned Fallon
- Rod La Rocque as "Doc" Sloan
- Tallulah Bankhead as Helen Carson
- Joseph Burke as Henry Carson
- Earl Schenck as Steve Fallon
