= Extra! Extra! =

1922 film

- Directed by: William K. Howard
- Written by: Arthur J. Zellner
- Story by: Julien Josephson
- Starring: Edna Murphy; Johnnie Walker; Herschel Mayall; Clarence Wilson; John Steppling
- Cinematography: George Webber
- Production company: Fox Film Corporation
- Distributed by: Fox Film Corporation
- Release date: March 5, 1922
- Running time: 5 reels
- Country: United States
- Languages: Silent (English intertitles)

Extra! Extra! is a 1922 American silent adventure romance film directed by William K. Howard and starring Edna Murphy, Johnnie Walker, Herschel Mayall, Clarence Wilson, and John Steppling. The film was released by Fox Film Corporation on March 5, 1922.

== Cast ==
- Edna Murphy as Myra Rogers
- Johnnie Walker as Barry Price
- Herschel Mayall as Edward Fletcher
- Clarence Wilson as Jim Rogers
- John Steppling as Haskell
- Gloria Woodthorpe as Mrs. Rogers
- Theodore von Eltz as Fordney Stowe
- Edward Jobson as Alvin Stowe
- Edna Walker

== Preservation ==
The film is now considered lost.

== See also ==
- List of lost films
- 1937 Fox vault fire
