= Olive Tell =

American actress

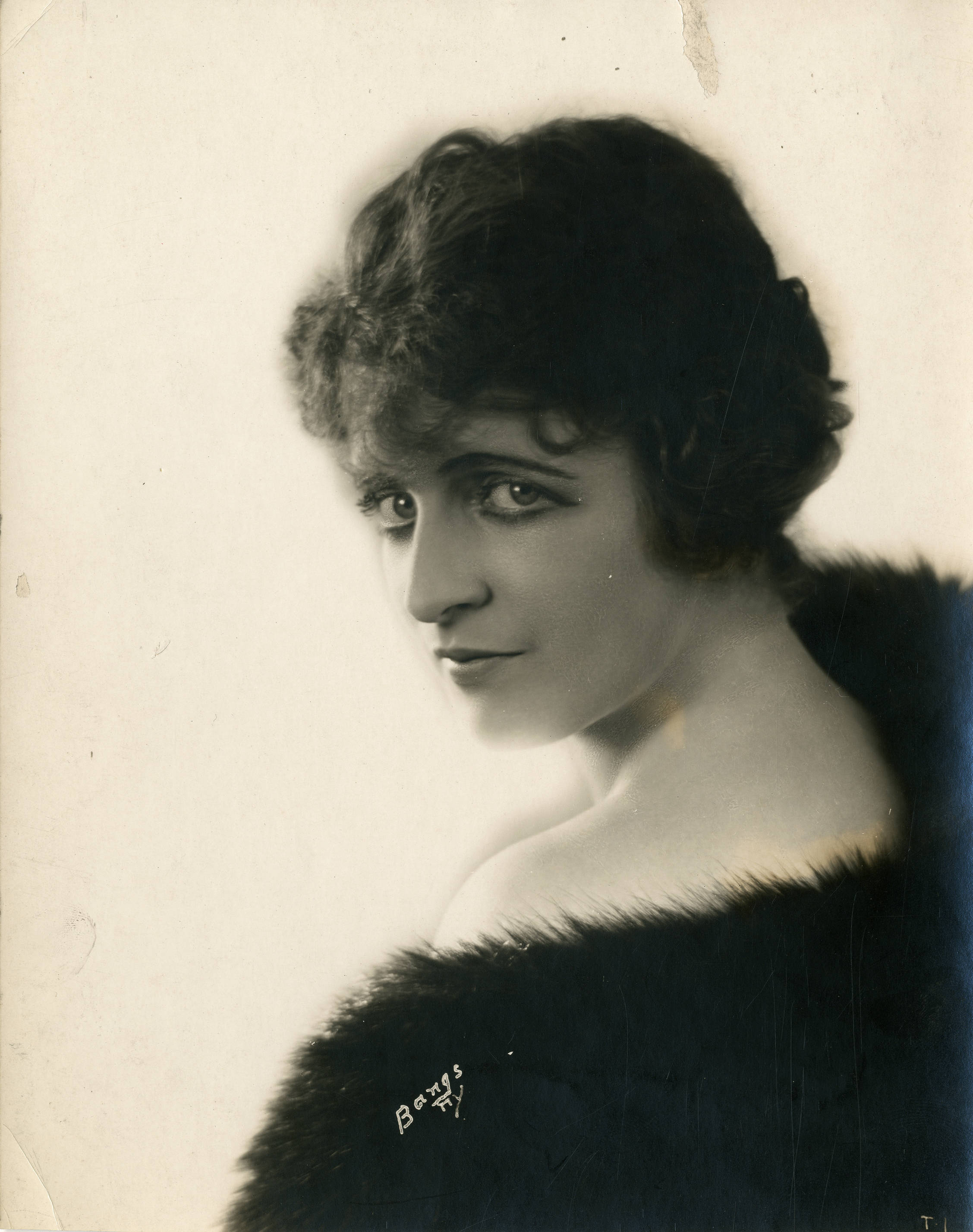
- Tell in 1924
- Born: September 27, 1894; New York City, U.S.
- Died: June 8, 1951 (aged 56); New York City, U.S.
- Years active: 1917–1938
- Spouses: George Willis Kreh (m. 1923; died 1923) Henry Hobart (m. 1926)
- Relatives: Alma Tell (sister)

Olive Tell (September 27, 1894 – June 8, 1951) was a stage and screen actress from New York City.

== Biography ==
Tell was educated in several cities in Europe. She and her younger actress sister Alma graduated from the American Academy of Dramatic Arts in 1915. In 1914 Olive starred as Mrs. Oliver in Anne Crawford Flexner's The Marriage Game at the Standard Theatre in Midtown Manhattan. In 1915 she was hired by Oliver Morosco as a member of the Manhattan Players, a repertory theatre company in New York. In August 1915 she starred with Julian Eltinge in the premiere of Charles Klein's Cousin Lucy, which was given on Broadway at George M. Cohan's Theatre. Later that year she portrayed Doris Baker in the Broadway production of Charles Kenyon's Husband and Wife at the 48th Street Theatre.

In 1919–1920 Tell portrayed Florence Lanham in the Broadway production of Thompson Buchanan's Civilian Clothes at the Morosco Theatre. In 1921 she starred as Marcia Kallan in Augustus Thomas's Nemesis at the Garrick Theatre in Philadelphia and on Broadway at the Hudson Theatre.

She first appeared in motion pictures during World War I. Her early screen roles were in silent films, including The Silent Master (1917), The Unforeseen (1917), Her Sister (1917), and National Red Cross Pageant (1917). Tell appeared with popular film actors of the era such as Donald Gallaher, Karl Dane, Ann Little, Rod La Rocque, Ethel Barrymore and a young Tallulah Bankhead.

Her first husband was killed in World War I. Tell married George Willis Kreh in April 1923; he died four months later; she married First National Pictures movie producer Henry Morgan Hobart in 1926. Hobart and Tell moved to California in 1926 and stayed in Hollywood for 12 years.

Her final screen credits came in the late 1930s. She performed in In His Steps (1936), Polo Joe (1936) with Joe E. Brown, Easy to Take (1936), and Under Southern Stars (1937). Tell's final screen appearance was in the drama Zaza (1939), directed by George Cukor.

Olive Tell died in Bellevue Hospital in 1951 after suffering a fractured skull at the Dryden Hotel, 150 East Thirty-Ninth Street, New York City, where she resided. She was 56 years old.

== Partial filmography ==
- The Silent Master (1917) - Miss Virginia Arlen
- The Unforeseen (1917) - Margaret Fielding
- Her Sister (1917) - Eleanor Alderson
- National Red Cross Pageant (1917) - Louvain - Flemish episode
- The Girl and the Judge (1918) - Winifred Stanton
- To Hell with the Kaiser! (1918) - Alice Monroe
- Secret Strings (1918) - Janet Newell
- The Trap (1919) - Jean Carson - the Schoolteacher Heroine
- Love Without Question (1920) based on the novel "The Abandoned Room" by Charles Wadsworth Camp - Katherine
- A Woman's Business (1920) - Barbara
- Wings of Pride (1920) - Olive Muir
- Clothes (1920) - Olivia Sherwood
- The Wrong Woman (1920) - Viola Sherwin
- Worlds Apart (1921) - Elinor Ashe
- Chickie (1925) - Ila Moore
- Womanhandled (1925) - Lucy Chatham
- Prince of Tempters (1926) - Duchess of Chatsfield
- Summer Bachelors (1926) - Mrs. Preston Smith
- Slaves of Beauty (1927) - Anastasia Jones
- Sailors' Wives (1928) - Careth Lindsey
- Soft Living (1928) - Mrs. Rodney S. Bowen
- The Trial of Mary Dugan (1929) - Mrs. Gertrude Rice
- Hearts in Exile (1929) - Anna Reskova
- The Very Idea (1929) - Marion Green
- Cock o' the Walk (1930) - Rosa Vallejo
- Lawful Larceny (1930) - Vivian Hepburn
- The Right of Way (1931) - Kathleen
- Ten Cents a Dance (1931) - Mrs. Carlton
- Woman Hungry (1931) - Betty Temple
- Ladies' Man (1931) - Mrs. Fendley
- Devotion (1931) - Mrs. Trent
- Delicious (1931) - Mrs. Van Bergh
- False Faces (1932) - Mrs. Day (uncredited)
- Strictly Personal (1933) - Mrs. Castleton
- The Witching Hour (1934) - Mrs. Helen Thorne
- The Scarlet Empress (1934) - Princess Johanna Elizabeth
- Private Scandal (1934) - Deborah Lane
- Baby Take a Bow (1934) - Mrs. Carson
- Four Hours to Kill! (1935) - Mrs. Madison
- Shanghai (1935) - Mrs. Hilton
- Brilliant Marriage (1936) - Mrs. Jane Taylor
- Yours for the Asking (1936) - Society Woman (uncredited)
- In His Steps (1936) - Elaine Brewster
- Polo Joe (1936) - Mrs. Hilton
- Easy to Take (1936) - Announcer (uncredited)
- Zaza (1939) - Jeanne Liseron (uncredited) (final film role)
