= I Conquer the Sea! =

1936 film directed by Victor Halperin

- Directed by: Victor Halperin
- Screenplay by: Rollo Lloyd; Howard Higgin
- Story by: Richard A. Carroll (adaptation and story)
- Produced by: Edward Halperin
- Starring: Steffi Duna; Dennis Morgan; Douglas Walton
- Cinematography: Arthur Martinelli
- Edited by: Douglas Briggs
- Music by: Arthur Kay
- Production company: Halperin Pictures
- Distributed by: State Rights; Academy Pictures
- Release date: January 24, 1936 (US)
- Running time: 70 minutes
- Country: United States
- Language: English

I Conquer the Sea! is a 1936 American drama film. Directed by Victor Halperin, the film stars Steffi Duna, Dennis Morgan, and Douglas Walton. It was released on January 24, 1936.

== Cast ==
- Steffi Duna as Rosita Gonzales
- Dennis Morgan as Tommy (credited as Stanly Morner)
- Douglas Walton as Leonard
- George Cleveland as Caleb
- Johnnie Pirrone Jr. as Pedro Gonzales
- Fred Warren as Sebastian
- Anna De Linsky as Mrs. Gonzales
- Charles McMurphy as Zack
- Frederick Peters as Stubby
- Tiny Skelton as Flukes
- Olin Francis as Gabe
- Albert Russell as Josh
- Dorothy Kildaire as Gabe's wife
- Renee Daniels as Stubby's wife
- James Hertz as Tiny
- Margaret Woodburn as Widow Penecoste
