= Louis Dumar =

American actor

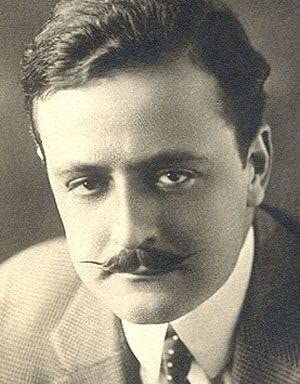
Louis Dumar in 1921

Louis Dumar (3 April 1896 – 15 December 1955) was an American actor with a brief career during the silent era. He is best remembered today for his role as Tigellinus in Salomé (1922).

Dumar was born Luigi Liserani in Boston, Massachusetts, in 1896, the son of recently arrived Italian immigrant parents, Carlo Liserani and Caterina (née Tessitori). He had two brothers who were also actors: his older brother, Gino Corrado (born Gino Corrado Liserani), and another brother, Lawrence Liserani, who mostly worked as an extra. Louis Dumar's film roles included: Prince Eiderstrom in The Great Impersonation (1921); Count Cognasto in The Lady from Longacre (1921); José De Silva in You Never Know (1922); Malcolm Thorne in The Golden Gift (1922), and Tigellinus in Salomé (1922).

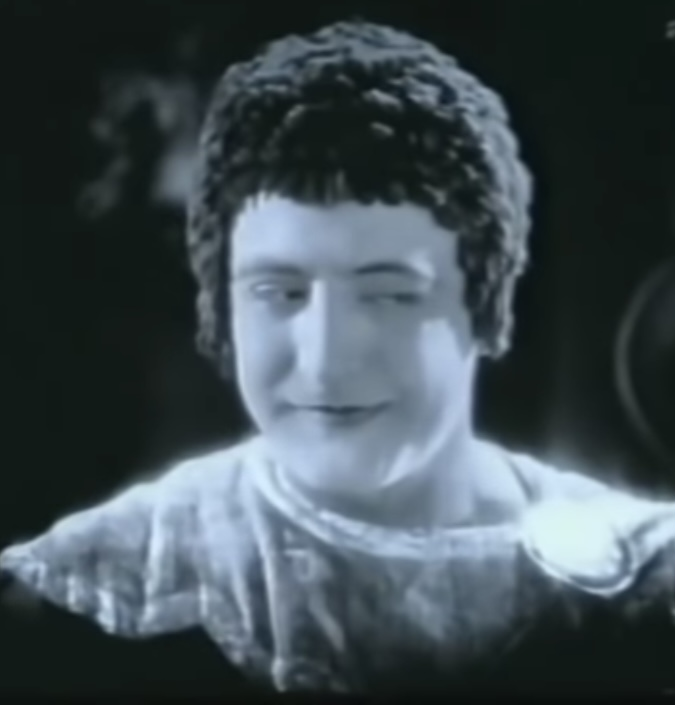
Dumar as Tigellinus in Salomé (1922)

Dumar was married to Vivian Eleanor Liserani née Marino (1914-1994) from 1940 to his death. They had two children.

Louis Dumar died in Alhambra, California in 1955.
