= Frederick Peters (actor) =

American actor (1884–1963)

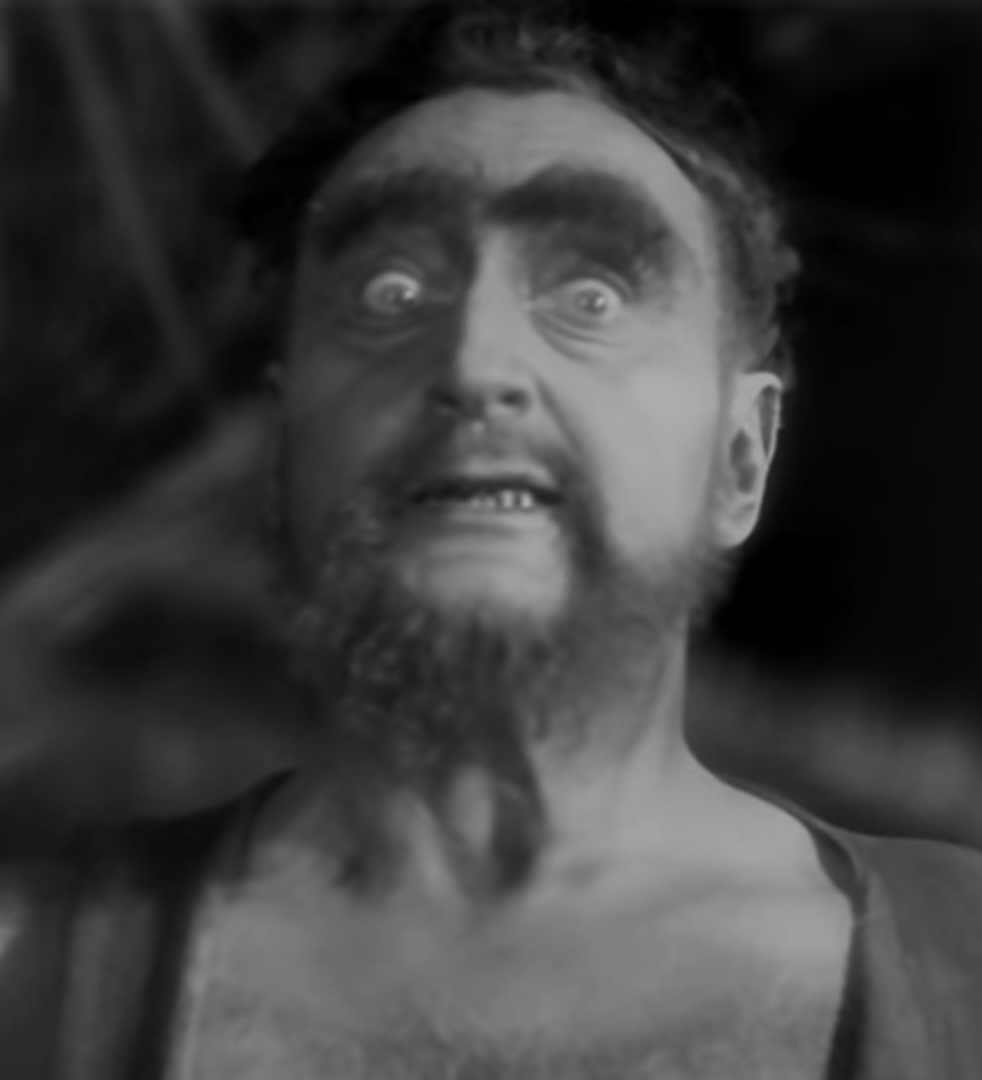
- Peters in White Zombie (1932)
- Born: Frederick P. Tuite; June 30, 1884; Waltham, Massachusetts, U.S.
- Died: April 23, 1963 (aged 78); Hollywood, California, U.S.
- Resting place: Forest Lawn Memorial Park, Hollywood Hills
- Occupation: Actor
- Years active: 1918–1936
- Spouse: Lillian Peters

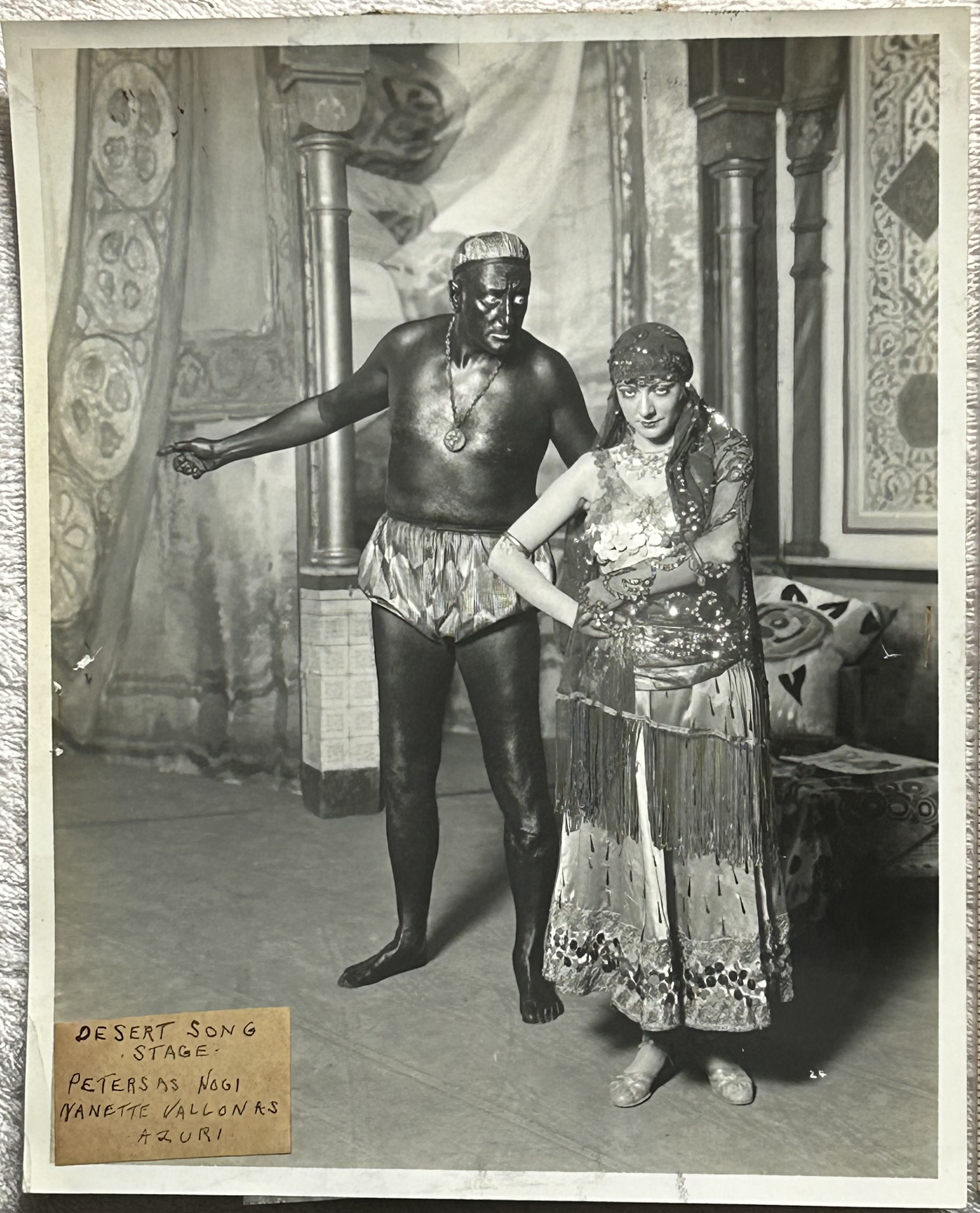
Peters in The Desert Song stage show

Frederick Peters (born Frederick P. Tuite; June 30, 1884 – April 23, 1963), was an American film actor. He appeared in 25 films between the years 1918 and 1936.

== Biography ==
He was born in Waltham, Massachusetts and died in Hollywood, California. His remains are interred at Forest Lawn Memorial Park in Hollywood Hills.

== Selected filmography ==
- Tarzan and the Golden Lion (1922)
- Salomé (1923)
- The Oregon Trail (1923)
- The Millionaire Cowboy (1924)
- White Zombie (1932)
- I Conquer the Sea! (1936)
