= That French Lady =

1924 film

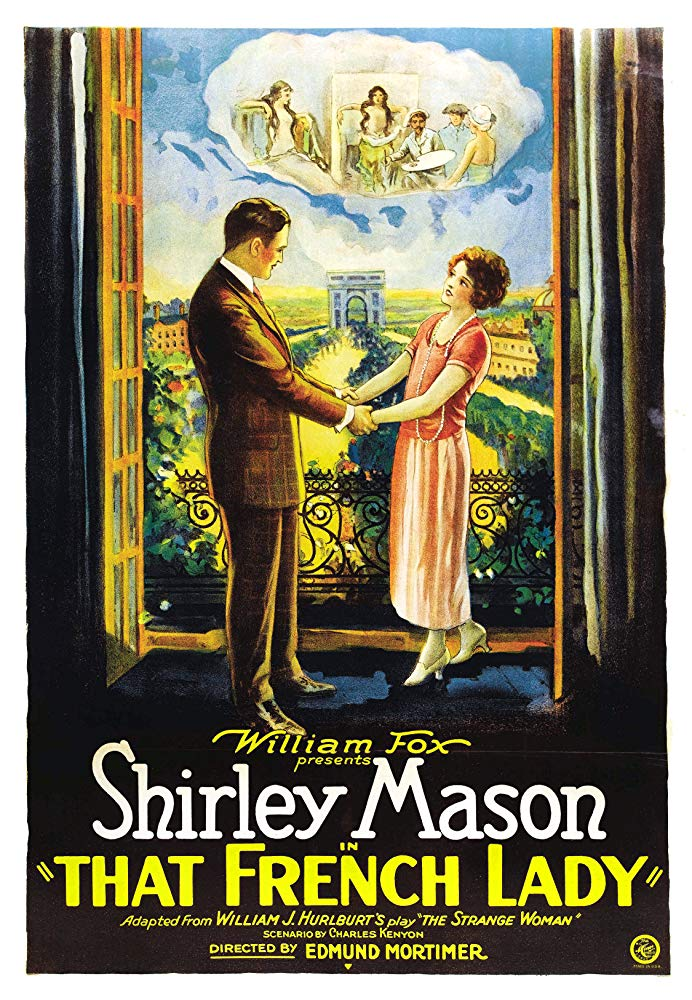
- Theatrical release poster
- Directed by: Edmund Mortimer
- Written by: Charles Kenyon
- Story by: William J. Hurlbut
- Based on: The Strange Woman by William J. Hurlburt
- Produced by: William Fox
- Starring: Shirley Mason
- Cinematography: G.O. Post
- Production company: Fox Film Corporation
- Distributed by: Fox Film Corporation
- Release date: August 17, 1924
- Running time: 60 minutes
- Country: United States
- Languages: Silent film (English intertitles)

That French Lady is a lost 1924 American silent romance drama film directed by Edmund Mortimer and starring Shirley Mason. It was produced and distributed by Fox Film Corporation.

It was based on a play by William Hurlbut, The Strange Woman and was played on Broadway in 1913 by Elsie Ferguson.

== Cast ==
- Shirley Mason - Inez de Pierrefond
- Theodore von Eltz - John Hemmingway
- Harold Goodwin - Charlie Abbey
- Charles Coleman - Uncle Walter

== Preservation ==
With no holdings located in archives, That French Lady is considered a lost film.

== See also ==
- 1937 Fox vault fire
