= Jacqueline Gadsden =

American silent film actress (1900–1986)

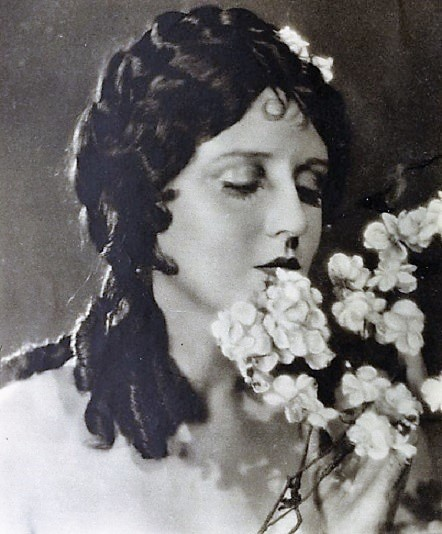
- Gadsden in 1929
- Born: August 3, 1900; Lompoc, California, U.S.
- Died: August 10, 1986 (aged 86); San Marcos, California, U.S.
- Other names: Jacqueline Gadsdon; Jane Daly
- Occupation: Actress
- Years active: 1923–1929
- Spouse: William Harry Dale (m. 1924; died 1975)

Jacqueline Gadsden (August 3, 1900 – August 10, 1986) was an American film actress during the silent era. A native of Southern California, she was born in Lompoc to Gerald F. and Jessie H. (Salter) Gadsden and is known to modern audiences as the wealthy, haughty other woman in the 1927 Clara Bow vehicle It. As a child, she acted in films for Triangle Film Corporation.

She married William Harry Dale about 1924. She portrayed Lon Chaney's character's wife in Tod Browning's West of Zanzibar in 1928. In most films she was billed as Jacqueline Gadsden but made two films under the name Jane Daly in 1929, her final year in film. She died in the San Diego County city of San Marcos a week after her 86th birthday.

== Partial filmography ==
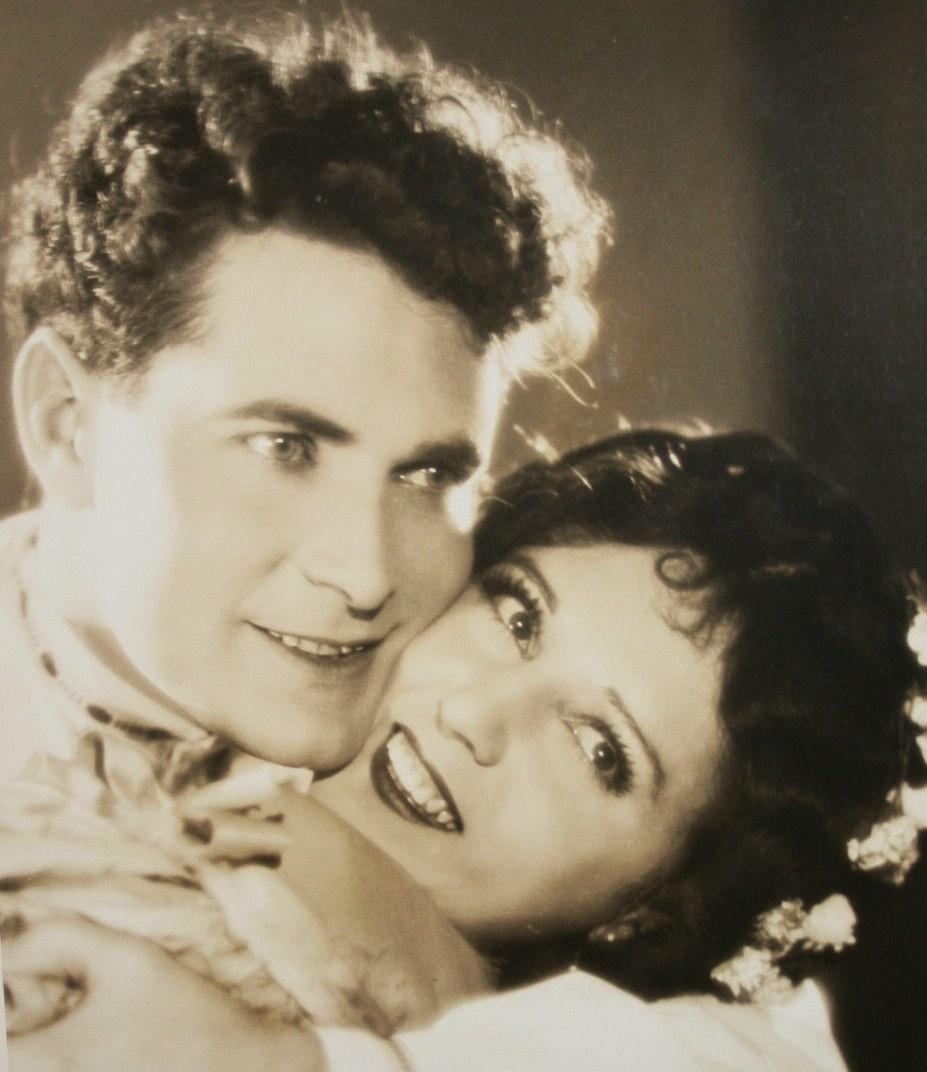
With Lloyd Hughes in The Mysterious Island (1929)

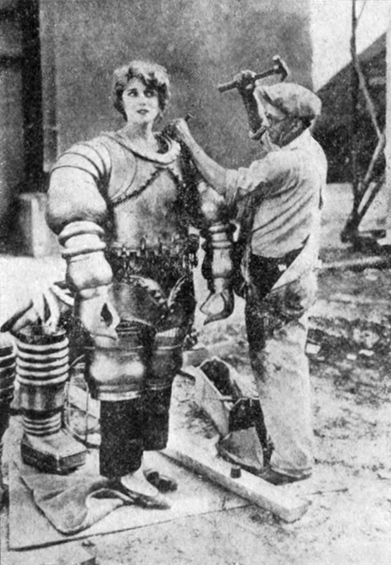
Gadsden prepared for a scene in The Mysterious Island

- Cordelia the Magnificent (1923)
- Skid Proof (1923)
- Big Dan (1923)
- The Man Who Won (1923)
- A Chapter in Her Life (1923)
- The Goldfish (1924)
- His Hour (1924) - Tatiana Shebanoff
- The Wife of the Centaur (1924)
- The Flaming Forties (1924)
- Man and Maid (1924)
- Ridin' the Wind (1925)
- The Merry Widow (1925)
- The Show (1927)
- It (1927)
- The Thirteenth Hour (1927)
- Beyond London Lights (1928)
- The City of Purple Dreams (1928)
- Red Hair (1928)
- West of Zanzibar (1928)
- A Bit of Heaven (1928)
- Forbidden Hours (1928)
- The Bellamy Trial (1929)
- The Quitter (1929)
- The Mysterious Island (1929)
