= Midshipman (disambiguation) =

A midshipman is an officer cadet, or a commissioned officer of the lowest rank, in the Royal Navy, United States Navy, and many Commonwealth navies.

Midshipman or midshipmen may also refer to:

- Midshipman (horse), an American Thoroughbred racehorse
- Midshipman fish, a member of the genus Porichthys of toadfishes
- Navy Midshipmen, the sports teams of the United States Naval Academy
- The Midshipman, a 1925 American silent film
