= Edmund Mortimer (actor) =

American actor (1874–1944)

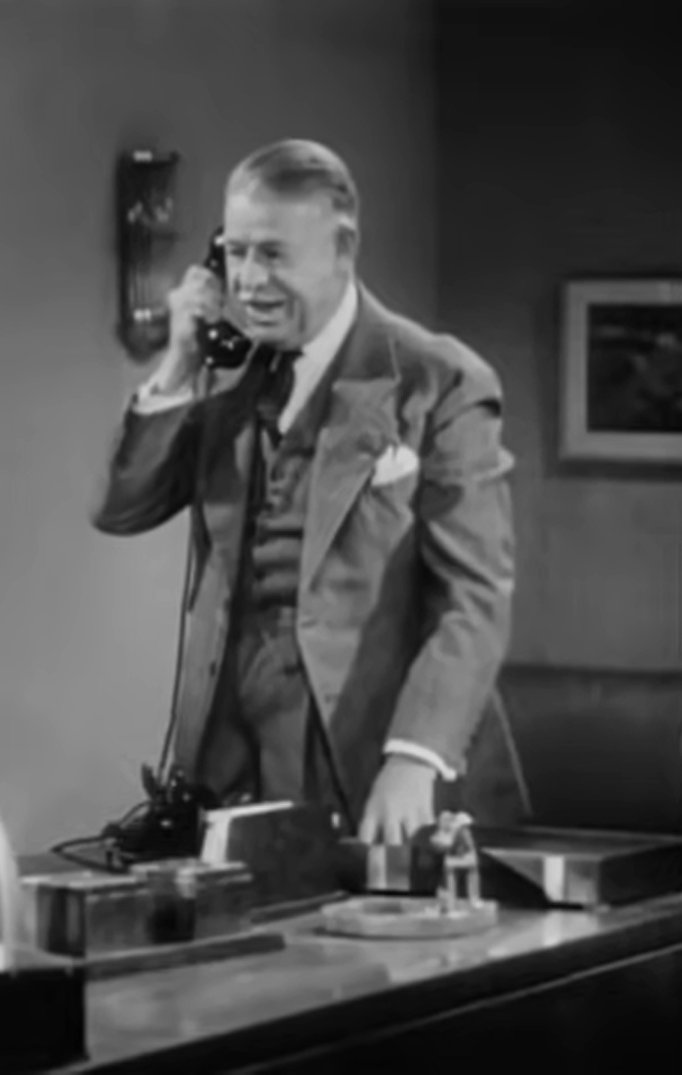
- Mortimer in The Devil Bat (1940)
- Born: Edmund Mortimer Olson; August 21, 1874; New York City, U.S.
- Died: May 21, 1944 (aged 69); Los Angeles, California, U.S.
- Occupations: Actor; film director
- Years active: 1913–1945
- Spouse: Louise Bates

Edmund Mortimer (born Edmund Mortimer Olson; August 21, 1874 – May 21, 1944) was an American actor and film director.

== Early years ==
Mortimer's family was "prominent socially in Brooklyn and Washington". His father (also named Edmund Mortimer Olson) was a captain in the U. S. Navy. As a boy, Mortimer sang in church choirs and participated in other musical activities in Brooklyn. His military service included membership; in the Second Naval Battalion and in Company C, 23rd Regiment.

== Career ==
Mortimer began acting on stage in 1904 and went on to perform with several theatrical companies. He appeared in more than 250 films between 1913 and 1945. He also directed 23 films between 1918 and 1928, including The Arizona Romeo (1925).

== Selected filmography ==
- Neptune's Daughter (1914)
- The Road Through the Dark (1918)
- The Savage Woman (1918)
- The Misfit Wife (1920)
- Alias Jimmy Valentine (1920, director)
- Railroaded (1923)
- The Wolf Man (1924)
- That French Lady (1924)
- A Man's Mate (1924, director)
- The Desert Outlaw (1924, director)
- Scandal Proof (1925)
- The Prairie Pirate (1925)
- The Man from Red Gulch (1925)
- Satan Town (1926)
- A Woman's Way (1928, director)
- Kiki (1931)
- Freshman Love (1936)
- 52nd Street (1937)
- At The Circus (1939)
- A Chump at Oxford (1940)
- Too Many Blondes (1941)
