= The Man from Red Gulch =

1925 film

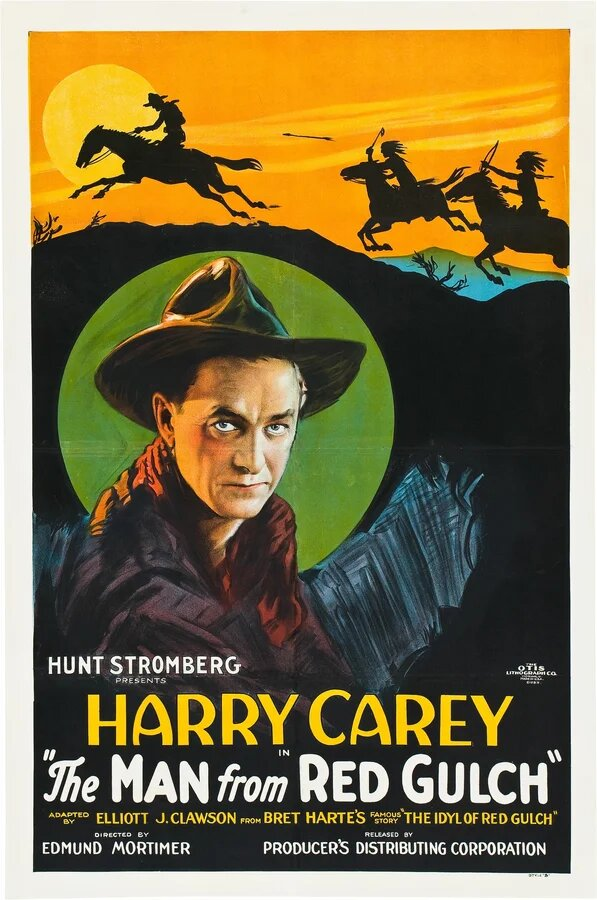
- Film poster
- Directed by: Edmund Mortimer
- Written by: Elliott J. Clawson
- Based on: "The Idyll of Red Gulch" by Bret Harte
- Produced by: Hunt Stromberg
- Starring: Harry Carey
- Cinematography: Georges Benoît
- Distributed by: Producers Distributing Corporation
- Release date: December 13, 1925
- Running time: 6 reels; 60 minutes
- Country: United States
- Language: Silent (English intertitles)

The Man from Red Gulch is a 1925 American silent Western film directed by Edmund Mortimer and featuring Harry Carey.

== Plot ==
As described in a film magazine review, during the California Gold Rush, Sandy’s partner John Falloner is shot by Jack Lasham, who years back had induced the dying man’s wife to run away with him. Sandy sends remittances to his partner’s children Cissy and Little Jimmy along with his photograph, and the children think him their real father. He visits them and meets Betsey, the sister of the deserted mother, who is caring for the children. She realizes that Sandy is not the real father but is posing for the children’s sake. Sandy hunts for the mother and finds her living under the name Madame Le Blanc and in charge of a gambling house run by Lasham. Lasham lures Betsy onto a boat, and Sandy fights with him, with Lasham falling into the water and drowning. He rescues Betsey, whom he has fallen in love, and they are married. The mother becomes a novitiate in a monastery, but the children never learn that she is actually their mother.

== Cast ==
- Harry Carey as Alexander 'Sandy' Morton
- Harriet Hammond as Betsey
- Frank Campeau as John Falloner
- Mark Hamilton as Old Man Frisbee
- Lee Shumway as Jack Lasham
- Doris Lloyd as Madame Le Blanc
- Frank Norcross as Col. Starbottle
- Virginia Davis as Cissy Falloner
- Michael D. Moore as Little Jimmie Falloner (credited as Mickey Moore)

== Preservation ==
Prints of The Man from Red Gulch are held at the Cineteca Italiana in Milan and the UCLA Film & Television Archive.

== See also ==
- Harry Carey filmography
