= Harriet Hammond =

American actress (1899–1991)

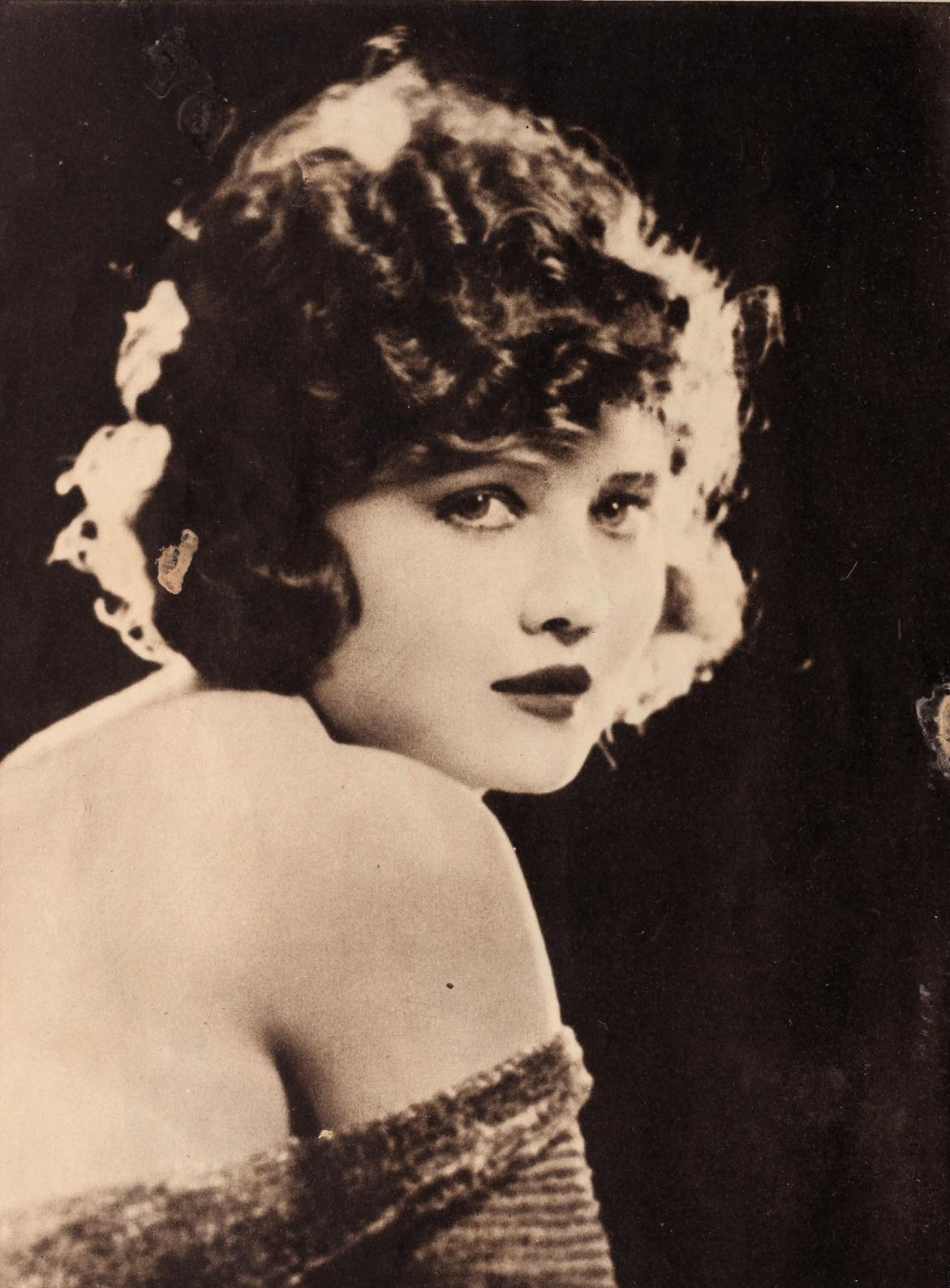
- Hammond, c. 1923
- Born: October 20, 1899; Kansas, US
- Died: September 23, 1991 (aged 91); Valley Center, California, US
- Occupation: Actress
- Years active: 1918–1930

Harriet Hammond (October 20, 1899 – September 23, 1991) was an American actress of the silent era. She appeared in more than 40 films between 1918 and 1930.

== Biography ==
Hammond, who was appearing in prominent roles in the Mack Sennett comedy features, was born in Kansas but had lived in Los Angeles, since her early childhood and was a graduate of Los Angeles High Schools.

Hammond studied piano and languages at Baylor and planned to become a concert pianist. The strain of six hours a day practice, however, proved too severe, and her health broke down. Starting as one of the Sennett Bathing Beauties she simultaneously developed great power as a comedian, and the Sennett figure. Miss Hammond appeared in "Gee Whiz!" and "By Golly".

She was a blond, had blue eyes and weighed a hundred and fifteen pounds. Miss Hammond was five feet seven inches high, and was an athlete, excelling in water sports.

Hammond was injured by a premature explosion on a film set. The blast blew her against an iron railing, and the injury made her an invalid for two years. She also had a nervous breakdown, but she returned to acting in January 1925. She sued Fox Film Corporation and related Fox companies for $118,500 damages.

== Selected filmography ==
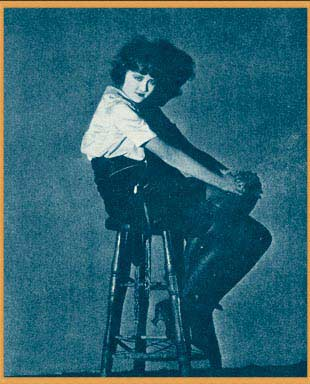
Publicity photo of Harriet Hammond from Who's Who on the Screen

- Down on the Farm (1920)
- A Small Town Idol (1921)
- Bits of Life (1921)
- Live and Let Live (1921)
- The Golden Gift (1922)
- Confidence (1922)
- Leap Year (1924)
- Soft Shoes (1925)
- The Midshipman (1925)
- Man and Maid (1925)
- The Man from Red Gulch (1925)
- Driftin' Thru (1926)
- The Seventh Bandit (1926)
- Queen of the Chorus (1928)
