= The Prairie Pirate =

1925 film

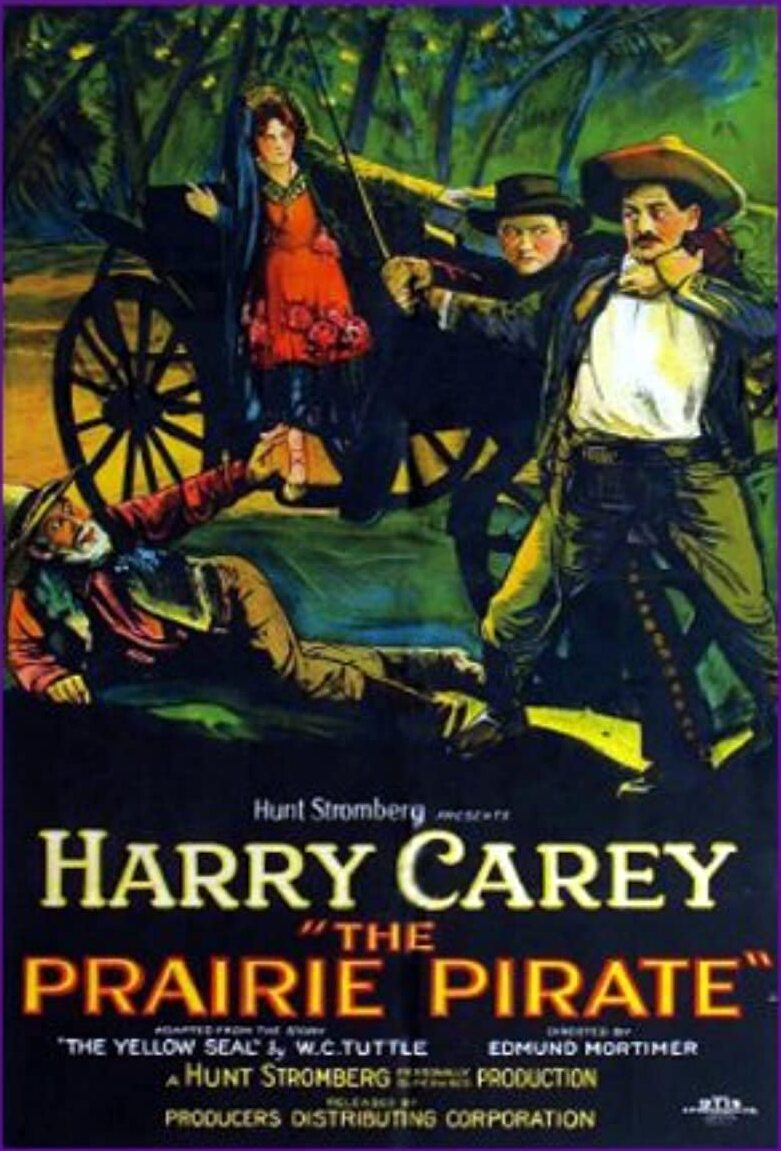
- Film poster
- Directed by: Edmund Mortimer
- Written by: Robert A. Dillon
- Based on: "The Yellow Seal" by W. C. Tuttle
- Produced by: Hunt Stromberg
- Starring: Harry Carey
- Cinematography: Georges Benoît
- Edited by: Harry L. Decker
- Distributed by: Producers Distributing Corporation
- Release date: October 11, 1925
- Running time: 60 minutes
- Country: United States
- Language: Silent (English intertitles)

The Prairie Pirate is a 1925 American silent Western film directed by Edmund Mortimer and featuring Harry Carey. A print of The Prairie Pirate exists.

== Plot ==
As described in a film magazine review, Brian Delaney, returning one evening from herding the cattle, finds his sister Ruth dead on the floor of the little cabin that served as their home. To discover the murderer of his sister, he decides to turn bandit and hides his real identity, soon becoming known and feared throughout the countryside as the “Yellow Seal.” In a little town near the foothills, the gambling house of Howard Steele is in full operation. Suddenly the Yellow Seal appears, rifles the cash drawer, demands the combination of the safe and, after cleaning it out, locks Steele in it and departs. He turns to face Teresa, the daughter of Don Esteban, a Spanish rancher who has allowed himself to get into Steele’s power through gambling debts. Steele wishes to cancel the debts by receiving Teresa’s consent to marriage. She is about to enter to bring her father away from the place where he has lost so much money. They stand there for a moment in the moonlight, and then as the crowd swarms out, the Yellow Seal leaps on his horse and is away, after giving her the slip with the combination of the safe, so that Steele may be released. That evening the Don has a turn of luck and wins. When he asks Steele for his notes, the gambler puts him off until the next day. In reality, the Yellow Seal has stolen the notes. The Don is held up and robbed of his winnings by Steele in the disguise of the “Yellow Seal.” When Teresa hears of this, the strange fascination regarding the Yellow Seal turns to hate. The Don, who thinks Steele still holds his notes, easily persuades her to consent to the marriage. The Yellow Seal hears of the coming marriage. In the church where the wedding is in full swing, the Yellow Seal suddenly appears and carries Teresa away with him. Not long after, the little church is again the scene of a new and happier wedding, with Teresa and Brian at the altar.

== Cast ==
- Harry Carey as Brian Delaney
- Trilby Clark as Teresa Esteban
- Lloyd Whitlock as Howard Steele
- Robert Edeson as Don Esteban
- Fred Kohler as Aguilar (the bandit)
- Jean Dumas as Ruth Delaney
- Tote Du Crow as José (uncredited)
- Bert Lindley as Sheriff (uncredited)
- Evelyn Selbie as Madre (uncredited)

== See also ==
- Harry Carey filmography
