= The Desert Outlaw =

1924 film

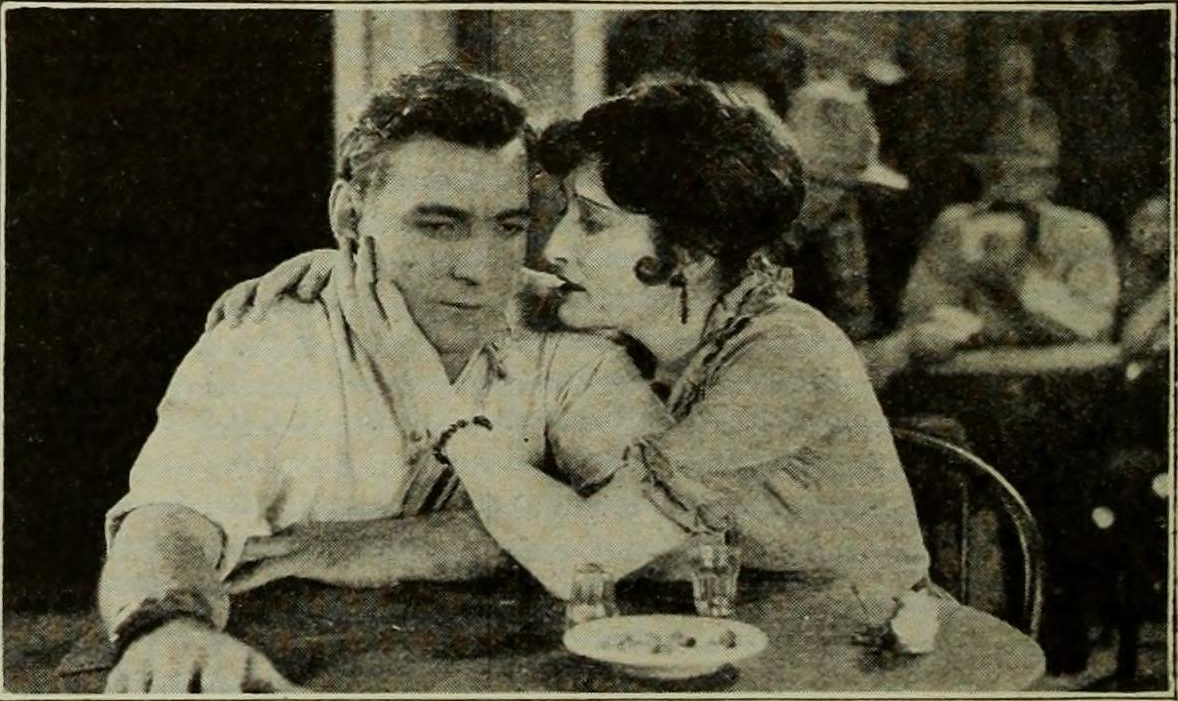
- Publicity still
- Directed by: Edmund Mortimer
- Written by: Charles Kenyon
- Produced by: William Fox
- Starring: Evelyn Brent
- Cinematography: Joseph Brotherton
- Distributed by: Fox Film Corporation
- Release date: August 24, 1924
- Running time: 65 minutes
- Country: United States
- Languages: Silent; English intertitles

The Desert Outlaw is a 1924 American silent Western film directed by Edmund Mortimer and starring Buck Jones and Evelyn Brent. Prints of the film survive in the Czech Film Archive.

== Cast ==
- Buck Jones as Sam Langdon
- Evelyn Brent as May Halloway
- DeWitt Jennings as Doc McChesney
- William Haines as Tom Halloway
- Claude Payton as Black Loomis
- William Gould as The Sheriff
