= The Mysterious Island (1929 film) =

1929 film

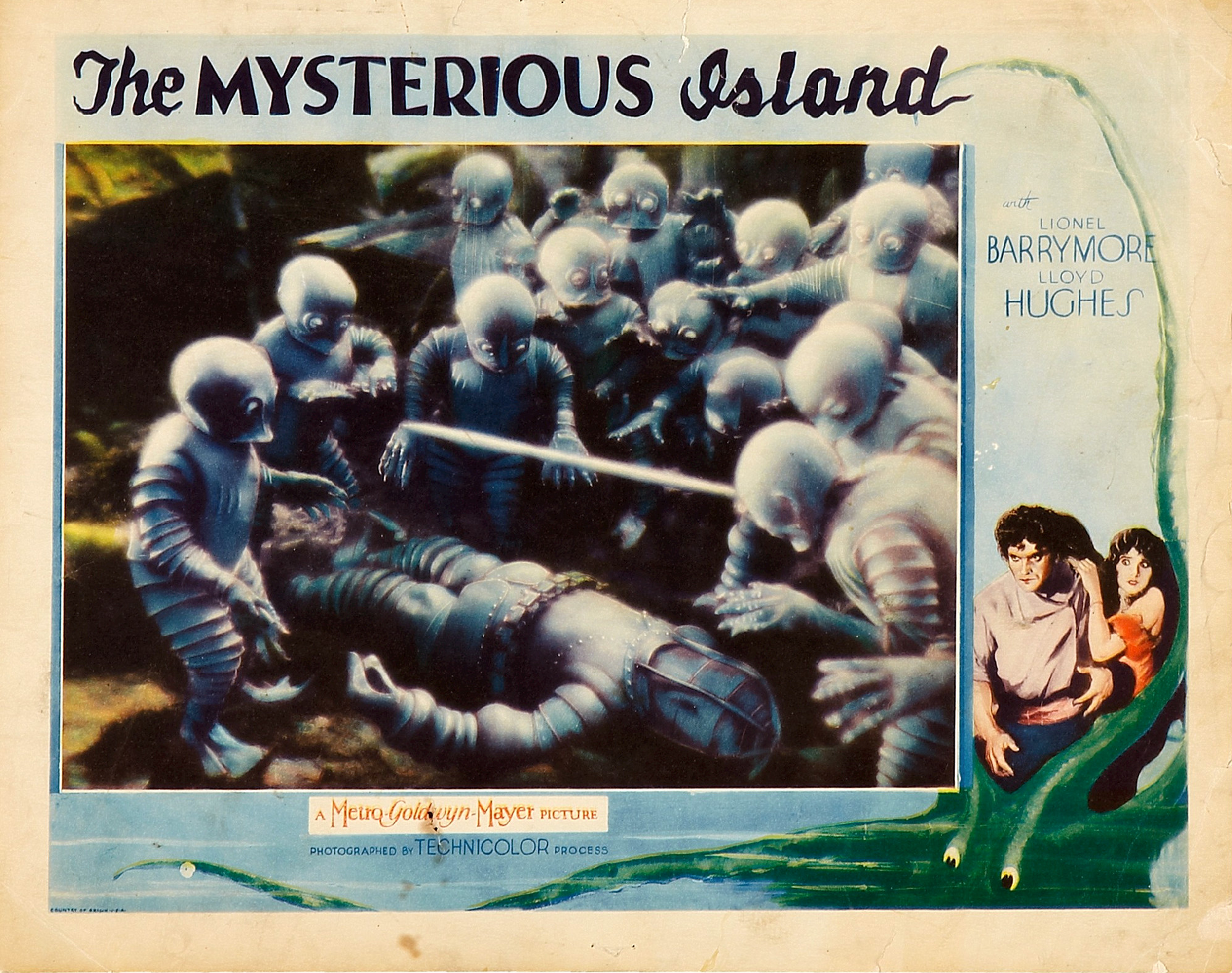
- Theatrical release lobby card
- Directed by: Lucien Hubbard
- Screenplay by: Lucien Hubbard
- Based on: The Mysterious Island; 1874 novel by Jules Verne
- Starring: Lionel Barrymore; Jacqueline Gadsden; Lloyd Hughes; Montagu Love; Harry Gribbon
- Cinematography: Percy Hilburn (*French)
- Edited by: Carl Pierson
- Music by: Martin Broones; Art Lange
- Color process: Technicolor with black-and-white sequence
- Production company: Metro-Goldwyn-Mayer
- Distributed by: Metro-Goldwyn-Mayer
- Release date: October 5, 1929
- Running time: 95 minutes 93 minutes Turner Library print 67 minutes restored version
- Country: United States
- Languages: Sound (Part-Talkie); English Intertitles
- Budget: $1,130,000

The Mysterious Island (full movie, black and white version)

The original Technicolor version of Mysterious Island.

The Mysterious Island is a 1929 American sound part-talkie science fiction film directed by Lucien Hubbard, based on Jules Verne's 1874 novel L'Île mystérieuse (The Mysterious Island). The film was photographed largely in two-color Technicolor. In addition to sequences with audible dialogue or talking sequences, the film features a synchronized musical score and sound effects along with English intertitles. The sound was recorded via the Western Electric sound-on-film process. The film was released by Metro-Goldwyn-Mayer.

== Plot ==
On a volcanic island near the kingdom of Hetvia rules Count Dakkar, a benevolent leader and scientist who has eliminated class distinction among the island's inhabitants. Dakkar, his daughter Sonia and her fiance, chief engineer Nicolai Roget, have designed a submarine boat which Roget pilots on its initial test voyage shortly before the island is overrun by Baron Falon, once Daggar's friend, and now the new despotic ruler of Hetvia. The Baron has Dakkar and his daughter tortured so that Dakkar will reveal all his discoveries. Dakkar is able to escape with the intervention of his loyal men. But Falon sets out after Roget and Dakkar using the Count's second submarine. The two underwater craft dive very deep to the ocean floor, where they discover a strange land populated by dragons, a giant octopus, and an eerie, undiscovered humanoid race.

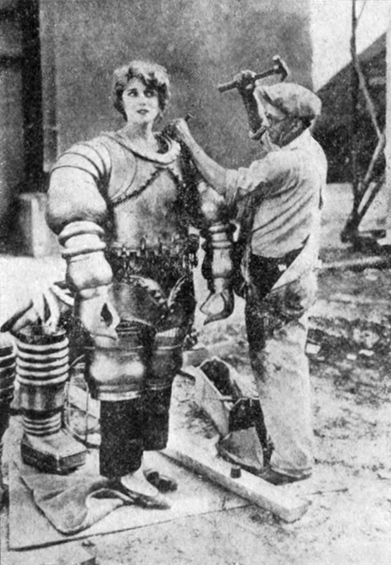
Jane Daly (Jacqueline Gadsden) prepared for a scene in The Mysterious Island

== Cast ==
- Lionel Barrymore as Count Andre Dakkar
- Jacqueline Gadsden as Sonia Dakkar
- Lloyd Hughes as Nikolai Roget
- Montagu Love as Falon
- Harry Gribbon as Mikhail
- Snitz Edwards as Anton
- Gibson Gowland as Dmitry
- Dolores Brinkman as Teresa
- Karl Dane (uncredited)
- Robert Dudley as Workman (uncredited)
- Angelo Rossitto as Underwater Creature (uncredited)
- Carl 'Major' Roup as Underwater Creature (uncredited)
- Billy Schuler (uncredited)
- Pauline Starke (uncredited)
- Jack Stoutenburg (uncredited)
- Harry Tenbrook as Workman (uncredited)
- Robert McKim (uncredited)

== Production ==
The film had a budget of $1,130,000. According to an article in the original Famous Monsters of Filmland magazine, production was actually started in 1926. There were various problems, including weather and the advent of talkies, which slowed/halted production several times before the film was finally completed and released three years later. The article included stills showing the original 1926 undersea denizens and the redesigned version which actually appeared in the film. Footage directed by Maurice Tourneur and Benjamin Christensen in 1927 was incorporated into the final 1929 version. John Ernest Williamson shot underwater scenes for the film using his Williamson Submarine Tube, but that footage was not used in the final version.

== Adaptation ==
The film is loosely based on the back-story given for Captain Nemo in the novel The Mysterious Island, and might more properly be thought of as a prequel to Twenty Thousand Leagues Under the Seas. It is the story of Count Dakkar (Captain Nemo's real name is revealed to be Prince Dakkar in The Mysterious Island), how he built his submarine, how he was betrayed, and how he became an outcast seeking revenge.

== Reception ==
The film's financial failure cost MGM $878,000.

== Preservation ==
Until recently, only one reel with a color sequence was thought to have survived, in the collection of the UCLA Film & Television Archive.

In 2013, Deborah Stoiber from the George Eastman Museum film archive visited Prague to examine the sole existing color copy of The Mysterious Island. The U.S. film experts, in cooperation with the Czech National Film Archive, restored the color print of The Mysterious Island. After the complete Technicolor print was discovered in Prague in December 2013, a new print of the film premiered at the 33rd Pordenone Silent Film Festival in October 2014.

== See also ==
- List of early color feature films
- List of early sound feature films (1926–1929)
- List of underwater science fiction works
- Lionel Barrymore filmography

== Works cited ==
- Medved, Harry; Medved, Michael (1984). The Hollywood Hall of Shame: The Most Expensive Flops in Movie History. Angus & Robertson. ISBN 0207149291.
