= Hunt Stromberg =

American film director (1894–1968)

- Born: July 12, 1894; Louisville, Kentucky, United States
- Died: August 23, 1968 (aged 74); Santa Monica, California, United States
- Resting place: Calvary Cemetery, Los Angeles
- Occupations: Film producer, director, writer, publicist
- Years active: 1921–1951
- Spouse: Katherine Kerwin (m. 1894; died 1951)
- Children: Hunt Stromberg Jr.
- Awards: Academy Award for Best Picture (The Great Ziegfeld; 1936)

Hunt Stromberg (July 12, 1894 – August 23, 1968) was an American film producer during Hollywood's Golden Age. In a prolific 30-year career beginning in 1921, Stromberg produced, wrote, and directed some of Hollywood's most profitable and enduring films, including The Thin Man series, the Nelson Eddy/Jeanette MacDonald operettas, The Women, and The Great Ziegfeld, which won the Academy Award for Best Picture of 1936.

== Early career ==
Hunt Stromberg was born in Louisville, Kentucky, in 1894. Leaving a career as a newspaper reporter and sports writer for the St. Louis Times, he followed an advertising friend into the motion picture industry prior to World War I, becoming publicity director for the Goldwyn Pictures Corporation in New York.

In 1918, the company sent Stromberg to California, where he developed an interest in filmmaking; by 1919 he had become the personal representative of industry pioneer Thomas H. Ince, and by 1921 he had written, produced and directed his first film. He promptly resigned from Ince's staff to form Hunt Stromberg Productions.

== Independent producer ==
From his first independent film, The Foolish Age (1921), Stromberg quickly made his mark by turning out independent, low-budget films in increasing quantity and quality.

In 1922 Stromberg signed Bull Montana, a popular matinee idol, to a long-term contract to star in short comedies, and hired comedy director Mal St. Clair, who had worked with Mack Sennett and Buster Keaton. When Sid Grauman saw a rough cut of the resulting A Ladies' Man (1922), he immediately booked the film to premiere at his Million Dollar Theater in Los Angeles on April 30, 1922. Stromberg continued his string of successes with Breaking into Society (1923), which he wrote, produced and directed.

== Metro-Goldwyn-Mayer ==
Stromberg joined newly formed Metro-Goldwyn-Mayer in 1925 and became one of its key executives, listed as one of the studio's "Big Four" with Louis B. Mayer, Irving Thalberg, and Harry Rapf—later with Thalberg, David O. Selznick, and Walter Wanger.

He was the first production supervisor to get a "produced by" credit on-screen, well deserved considering his achievements. He produced:

- all of Jean Harlow's films
- Joan Crawford's breakthrough films
- Greta Garbo's first American film, Torrent (1926)
- the Nelson Eddy/Jeanette MacDonald operetta cycle
- the William Powell/Myrna Loy "Thin Man" series

as well as such prestige milestones as Academy Award-winning The Great Ziegfeld (1936), Marie Antoinette (1938), The Women (1939), and Pride and Prejudice (1940). At the height of his career, MGM was producing 52 films a year, or an average of one film a week, staying in the black despite the Great Depression.

Stromberg was one of the top ranked money makers of Hollywood, with a salary to match: US $8,000 a week, guaranteed. In 1937, he was included in management's inner circle and received an additional 1.5% of Loews Theaters profits. The Treasury Department listed Stromberg as one of the ten highest paid executives in the United States.

But there were substantial changes in those years. Thalberg died in 1936, while Selznick and Wanger left MGM in 1937, leaving Mayer in sole, hands-on control. There are conflicting interpretations of what caused the rift, but by the end of 1941 it was over: after 18 years Stromberg walked away from a contract worth millions, and Mayer let him go on February 10, 1942.

== Independent again ==
Hunt Stromberg was the first producer added to the Society of Independent Motion Picture Producers in 1942 after the group had been formed by Charlie Chaplin, Walt Disney, Samuel Goldwyn, Alexander Korda, Mary Pickford, David O. Selznick, Walter Wanger, and Orson Welles.

Confounding industry expectations, Stromberg launched his own independent production company, based at RKO's Encino movie ranch, in 1943 with the smash hit Lady of Burlesque, starring Barbara Stanwyck, which grossed $1.85 million.

His subsequent films were not as successful and he finally retired in 1951, in the same year his wife, Katherine Kerwin (1895–1951), died. An avid horseman and a shrewd businessman, Stromberg was independently wealthy by this time as well as a founding investor in Santa Anita Park and Hollywood Park Racetracks.

== Death ==
Stromberg died on August 23, 1968. He was survived by his son Hunt Stromberg Jr., a Broadway and television producer in his own right.

== Filmography ==
=== Producer ===
- Eden and Return (1921)
- Boy Crazy (1922)
- Breaking Into Society (1923)
- The Fire Patrol (1924)
- The Night Hawk (1924)
- The Lightning Rider (1924)
- Tiger Thompson (1924)
- A Cafe in Cairo (1924)
- The Flaming Forties (1924)
- Roaring Rails (1924)
- The Texas Trail (1925)
- The Crimson Runner (1925)
- Soft Shoes (1925)
- Off the Highway (1925)
- Silent Sanderson (1925)
- Beyond the Border (1925)
- The Primrose Path (1925)
- The Prairie Pirate (1925)
- The Bad Lands (1925)
- The Man from Red Gulch (1925)
- The People vs. Nancy Preston (1925)
- Torrent (1926)
- White Shadows in the South Seas (1928)
- Our Dancing Daughters (1928)
- The Bridge of San Luis Rey (1929)
- Thunder (1929)
- Our Modern Maidens (1929)
- Where East Is East (1929)
- Call of the Flesh (1930)
- The Easiest Way (1931)
- Le chanteur de Séville (1931)
- Guilty Hands (1931)
- The Beast of the City (1932)
- The Wet Parade (1932)
- Letty Lynton (1932)
- Red Dust (1932), co-producer
- Eskimo (1933) co-producer
- Penthouse (1933)
- Stage Mother (1933)
- Bombshell (1933)
- The Prizefighter and the Lady (1933)
- Laughing Boy (1934)
- Chained (1934)
- Treasure Island (1934)
- Hide-Out (1934), co-producer
- The Painted Veil (1934)
- The Thin Man (1934)
- Naughty Marietta (1935), co-producer
- Ah, Wilderness! (1935), co-producer
- Wife vs. Secretary (1936), co-producer
- The Great Ziegfeld (1936)
- Small Town Girl (1936)
- After the Thin Man (1936)
- Rose-Marie (1936)
- The Firefly (1937)
- Maytime (1937), co-producer
- Night Must Fall (1937)
- Sweethearts (1938)
- Marie Antoinette (1938)
- Idiot's Delight (1939)
- Another Thin Man (1939)
- The Women (1939)
- Northwest Passage (1940)
- Susan and God (1940)
- Pride and Prejudice (1940)
- They Met in Bombay (1941)
- Shadow of the Thin Man (1941)
- I Married an Angel (1942)
- Lady of Burlesque (1943)
- Guest in the House (1944)
- Delightfully Dangerous (1945)
- Young Widow (1946)
- The Strange Woman (1946)
- Dishonored Lady (1947)
- Lured (1947)
- Too Late for Tears (1949)
- Between Midnight and Dawn (1950)
- Mask of the Avenger (1951)

=== Director or Screenwriter ===
- The Foolish Age (1921), writer
- Breaking Into Society (1923), director
- The Siren of Seville (1924), director
- Roaring Rails (1924), screenwriter
- The Fire Patrol (1924, director
- Paint and Powder (1925, director
- Soft Shoes (1925), screenwriter
- Winning the Futurity (1926), screenwriter
- The White Sister (1933), director
- The Strange Woman (1946), screenwriter
