= The Seventh Bandit =

1926 film

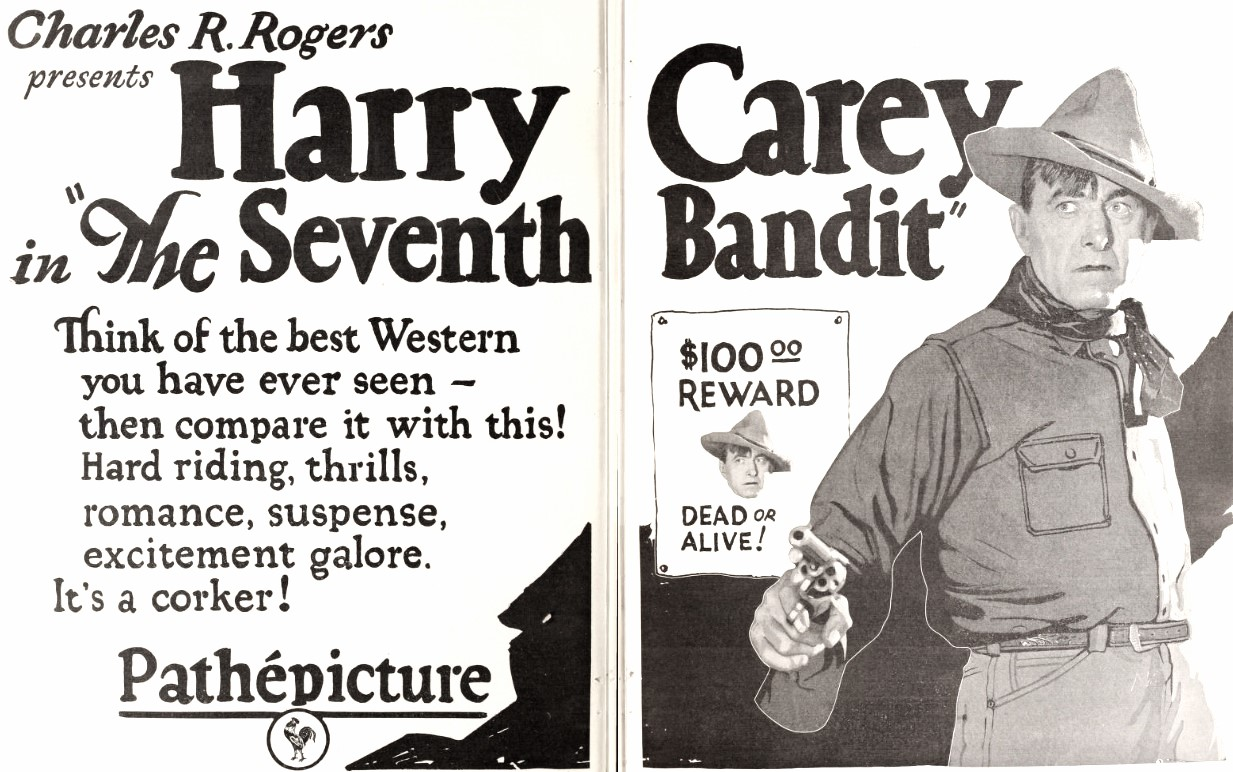
- Advertisement
- Directed by: Scott R. Dunlap
- Written by: Arthur Preston Hankins; Richard Schayer
- Starring: Harry Carey
- Cinematography: Sol Polito
- Distributed by: Pathe Exchange
- Release date: April 18, 1926
- Running time: 60 minutes
- Country: United States
- Language: Silent (English intertitles)

The Seventh Bandit is a 1926 American silent Western film directed by Scott R. Dunlap and featuring Harry Carey.

== Plot ==
As described in a film magazine review, David Scanlona is a former bandit who has forsaken that life and settled down on a quiet little ranch with his brother Paul. With David's blessing, his brother leaves to seek his fortune in the world but loses his life when he is killed by a villainous dance hall proprietor. David, using the name Texas Brady, joins a bandit gang in order to find a man who murdered his young brother. Aided by Doctor Shirley Chalmette, whom David meets during a stagecoach hold-up, he learns that Goring is the man guilty of the murder. There is a terrific battle between David and Goring at the climax of the film in which the murderer is killed and David is blinded. David is then nursed back to health by Shirley and he recovers his sight. He happily weds his "doctoress."

== Cast ==
- Harry Carey as David Scanlon / Texas Brady
- James Morrison as Paul Scanlon
- Harriet Hammond as Dr. Shirley Chalmette
- John Webb Dillion as Jim Gresham
- Trilby Clark as Ann Drath
- Walter James as Ben Goring

== Preservation ==
A fragment of The Seventh Bandit is held by the BFI National Archive.

== See also ==
- Harry Carey filmography
