= Desert Blossoms =

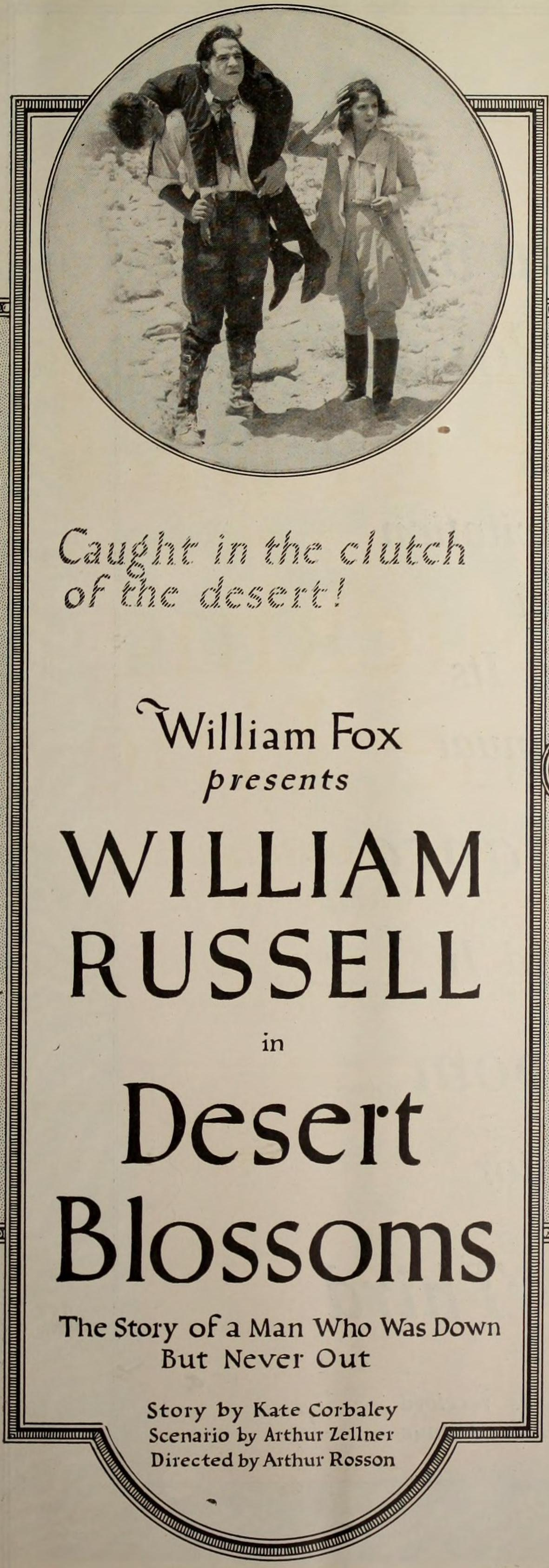
- Contemporary advertisement
- Directed by: Arthur Rosson
- Written by: Kate Corbaley; Arthur J. Zellner
- Produced by: William Fox
- Starring: William Russell; Helen Ferguson; Wilbur Higby
- Cinematography: Ross Fisher
- Production company: Fox Film
- Distributed by: Fox Film
- Release date: November 18, 1921
- Running time: 50 minutes
- Country: United States
- Languages: Silent; English intertitles

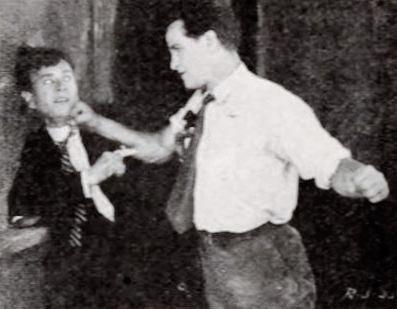
Scene from the film

Desert Blossoms is a 1921 American silent drama film directed by Arthur Rosson and starring William Russell, Helen Ferguson and Wilbur Higby.

== Cast ==
- William Russell as Stephen Brent
- Helen Ferguson as Mary Ralston
- Wilbur Higby as James Thornton
- Willis Robards as Henry Ralston
- Margaret Mann as Mrs. Thornton
- Dulcie Cooper as Lucy Thornton
- Charles Spere as Bert Thornton
- Gerald Pring as Mr. Joyce

== Preservation ==
Desert Blossoms is currently presumed lost. In February of 2021, the film was cited by the National Film Preservation Board on their Lost U.S. Silent Feature Films list.
