= Roaring Rails =

1924 film

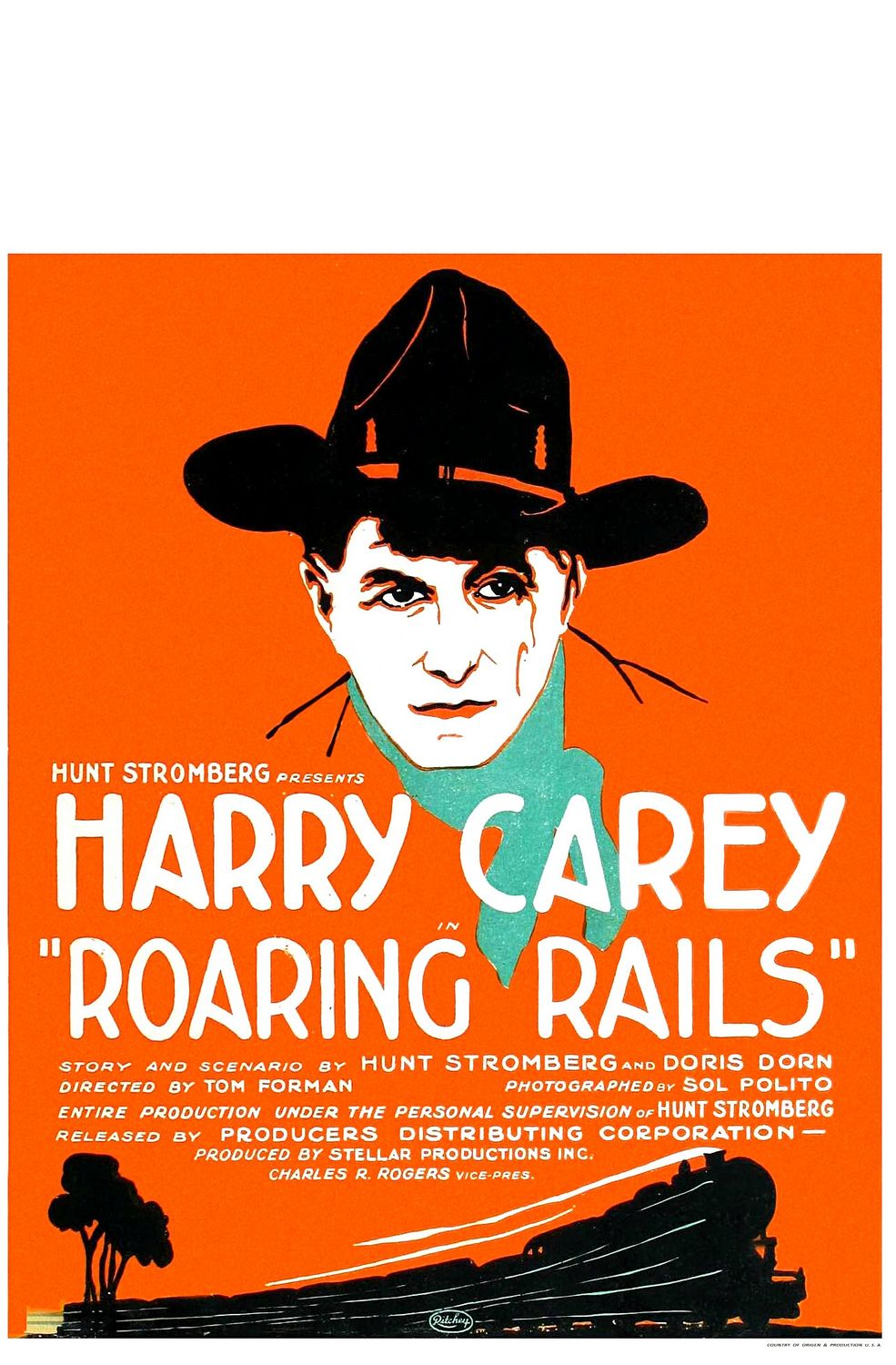
- Roaring Rails film poster
- Directed by: Tom Forman
- Written by: Doris Dorn; Hunt Stromberg
- Starring: Harry Carey
- Cinematography: Sol Polito
- Distributed by: Producers Distributing Corporation
- Release date: September 21, 1924
- Running time: 60 minutes
- Country: United States
- Language: Silent (English intertitles)

Roaring Rails is a 1924 American silent Western film directed by Tom Forman and featuring Harry Carey.

== Cast ==
- Harry Carey as Bill "Big Bill" Benson
- Frankie Darro as Bill "Little Bill" Benson
- Edith Roberts as Nora Burke
- Wallace MacDonald as Malcolm Gregory
- Frank Hagney as "Red" Burley
- Duke R. Lee as John McFarlane

== Preservation ==
A complete print of Roaring Rails held by the George Eastman Museum had its restoration funded by the National Film Preservation Foundation in 2010. On December 14, 2011, Turner Classic Movies aired this restored film.

== See also ==
- Harry Carey filmography
