= Big Dan (film) =

1923 film

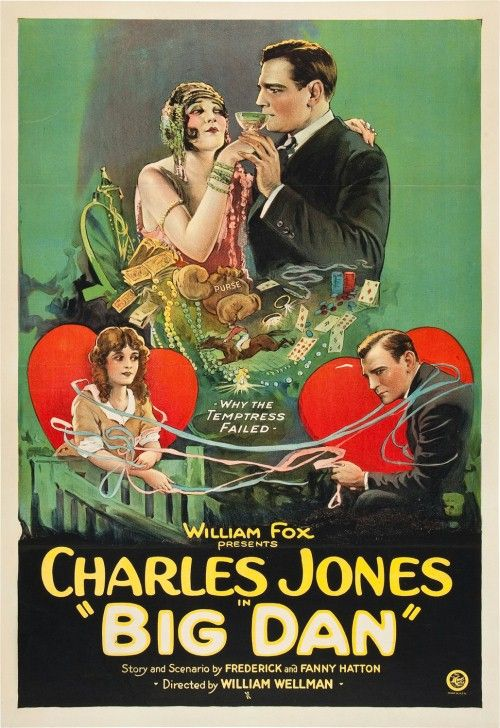
- Theatrical release poster
- Directed by: William A. Wellman
- Screenplay by: Frederic Hatton; Fanny Hatton
- Starring: Buck Jones; Marian Nixon; Ben Hendricks Jr. Trilby Clark; Jacqueline Gadsden; Charles Coleman
- Cinematography: Joseph August
- Production company: Fox Film Corporation
- Distributed by: Fox Film Corporation
- Release date: October 14, 1923
- Running time: 60 minutes
- Country: United States
- Language: silent (English intertitles)

Big Dan is a 1923 United StatesAmerican silent drama film directed by William A. Wellman and written by Frederic Hatton and Fanny Hatton. The film stars Buck Jones, Marian Nixon, Ben Hendricks Jr., Trilby Clark, Jacqueline Gadsden, and Charles Coleman. The film was released on October 14, 1923, by Fox Film Corporation.

== Cast ==
- Buck Jones as Dan O'Hara
- Marian Nixon as Dora Allen
- Ben Hendricks Jr. as Cyclone Morgan
- Trilby Clark as Mazie Williams
- Jacqueline Gadsden as Nellie McGee
- Charles Coleman as Doc Snyder
- Lydia Yeamans Titus as Aunt Kate Walsh
- Monte Collins as Tom Walsh
- Charles Smiley as Father Quinn
- Harry J. Lonsdale as Stephen Allen
- Mattie Peters as Ophelia
- J. P. Lockney as Pat Mayo
- Jack Herrick as Muggs Murphy
- Buck Black as Young Boy (uncredited)

== Preservation ==
A complete print of Big Dan is held in the UCLA Film & Television Archive.
