= Do and Dare =

1922 film directed by Edward Sedgwick

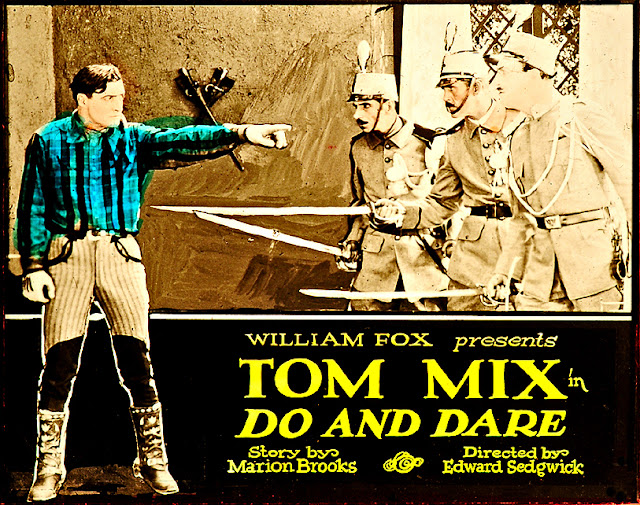
- Directed by: Edward Sedgwick
- Written by: Marion Brooks; Edward Sedgwick; Ralph Spence
- Produced by: William Fox
- Starring: Tom Mix; Dulcie Cooper; Claire Adams
- Cinematography: Daniel B. Clark
- Edited by: Ralph Spence
- Production company: Fox Film Corporation
- Distributed by: Fox Film Corporation
- Release date: October 1, 1922
- Running time: 50 minutes
- Country: United States
- Languages: Silent; English intertitles

Do and Dare is a 1922 American silent Western film directed by Edward Sedgwick and starring Tom Mix, Dulcie Cooper and Claire Adams. This film is considered lost.

== Cast ==
- Tom Mix as Kit Carson Boone / Henry Boone
- Dulcie Cooper as Mary Lee
- Claire Adams as Juanita Sánchez
- Claude Payton as Córdoba
- Jack Rollens as José Sánchez
- Hector V. Sarno as General Sánchez
- Wilbur Higby as Colonel 'Handy' Lee
- Robert Klein as Yellow Crow
- Gretchen Hartman as Zita

== Preservation ==
With no holdings located in archives, Do and Dare is considered a lost film.
