= Satan Town =

1926 film

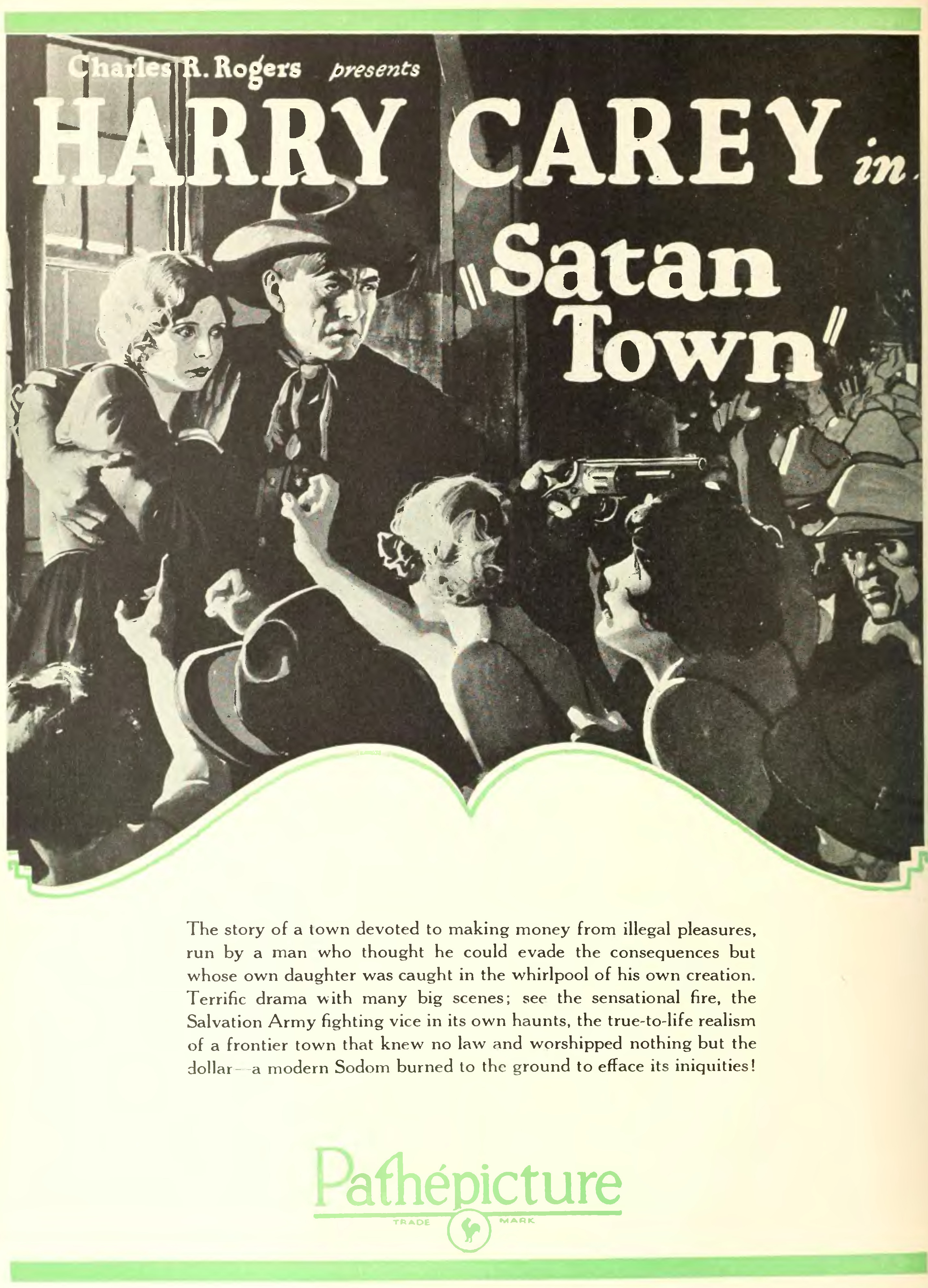
- Advertisement
- Directed by: Edmund Mortimer
- Written by: Jack Boyle; Marion Jackson
- Starring: Harry Carey
- Cinematography: Sol Polito
- Distributed by: Pathé Exchange
- Release date: August 15, 1926
- Running time: 63 minutes
- Country: United States
- Language: Silent (English intertitles)

Satan Town is a 1926 American silent Western film directed by Edmund Mortimer and featuring Harry Carey.

== Plot ==
As described in a film magazine review, Bill Scott has a ticket for a steamer headed to Alaska, but sells it for $1,000 so that he can fund the education for a small girl named Sue that he has befriended at an orphanage. He gives the money to John Jerome, who is a crooked lawyer. Bill then ships out working as a stoker on the steamer, and strikes it rich during the Nome Gold Rush, and continues to send money during the next 12 years to Jerome for the education of the girl. However, Jerome is using the money to pay his own daughter's education and to finance Satan Town, a series of shacks devoted to gambling, dance halls, and other vices. Bill returns to the town a millionaire, but still dressed in his western garb, he starts to make things hum for the crooked lawyer who had deceived him. In Satan Town, Bill befriends a young woman working at The Salvation Army who he later discovers is Sue, the little orphan girl he once knew. Meanwhile, the lawyer is properly punished for all his villainy when he discovers that his own daughter has become a victim of the vice of the city of evil he has been promoting.

== Cast ==
- Harry Carey as Bill Scott
- Kathleen Collins as Sue
- Charles Clary as John Jerome
- Trilby Clark as Sheila Jerome
- Richard Neill as Cherokee Charlie
- Ben Hall as Crippy Jack
- Charles Delaney as Frisco Bob
- Ben Hendricks Sr. as Malamute (credited as Ben Hendricks)

== Preservation ==
An abridged incomplete print of Satan Town is held by a private collector.

== See also ==
- Harry Carey filmography
