= Scandal Proof =

1925 film

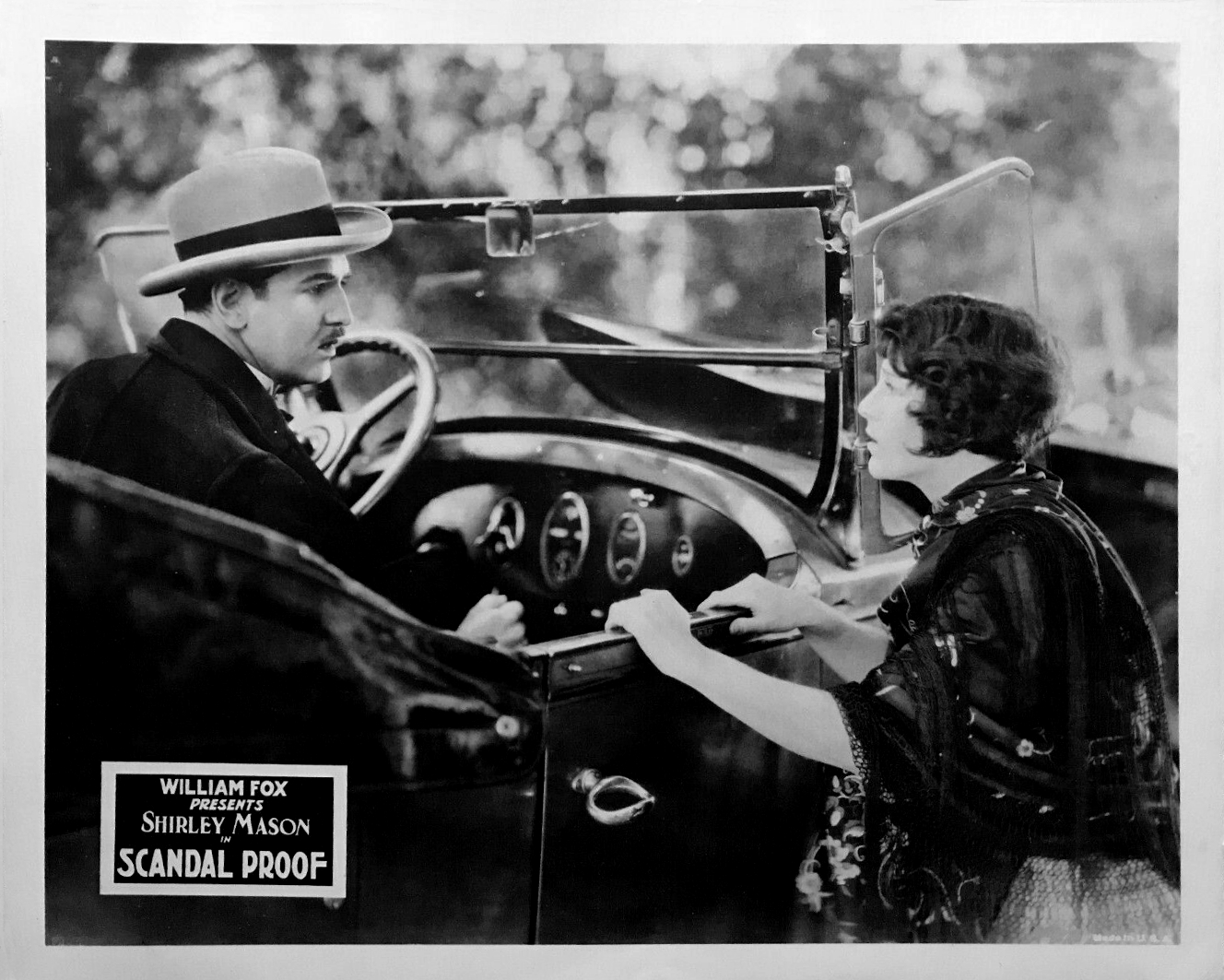
- Lobby card
- Directed by: Edmund Mortimer
- Screenplay by: Charles Kenyon
- Starring: Shirley Mason; John Roche; Freeman Wood; Hazel Howell; Frances Raymond; Ruth King
- Production company: Fox Film Corporation
- Distributed by: Fox Film Corporation
- Release date: May 31, 1925
- Running time: 50 minutes
- Country: United States
- Language: Silent (English intertitles)

Scandal Proof is a lost 1925 American silent drama film directed by Edmund Mortimer and written by Charles Kenyon. The film stars Shirley Mason, John Roche, Freeman Wood, Hazel Howell, Frances Raymond, and Ruth King. The film was released on May 31, 1925, by Fox Film Corporation.

== Plot ==
As described in a film magazine review, Grace Whitney uses her inheritance to open up an Oriental shop, but the business is almost bankrupt. Monty Brandster comes in the shop and purchases an expensive jade necklace for Thelma Delores, who looks to be a gold digger. Monte invites Grace to a New Year's Eve party at his home, which proves to be a wild all night affair. After Monte is killed, Grace is held based upon circumstantial evidence. During the trial, when she is about to be convicted, she is saved by the testimony of a suitor, Herbert Wyckoff.

== Cast ==
- Shirley Mason as Enid Day / Grace Whitney
- John Roche as Herbert Wyckoff
- Freeman Wood as Monty Brandster
- Hazel Howell as Thelma Delores
- Frances Raymond as Mrs. Brandster
- Ruth King as Lillian Hollister
- Edward Martindel as Reed Hollister
- Joseph Striker as Dick Thorbeck
- Billy Fay as Benny Hollister
- Clarissa Selwynne as Miss Wyckoff
