= Maria Marten (1928 film) =

1928 film

- Directed by: Walter West
- Produced by: Harry Rowson
- Starring: Trilby Clark; Warwick Ward; Dora Barton; James Knight
- Cinematography: Phil Ross
- Production company: Harry Rowson Productions
- Distributed by: Ideal Film Company
- Release date: March 1928
- Running time: 75 minutes
- Country: United Kingdom
- Language: English

Maria Marten is a 1928 British silent drama film directed by Walter West starring Trilby Clark, Warwick Ward and Dora Barton. It is based on the real story of the Red Barn Murder in the 1820s, and is one of five film versions of the events. The film shifted the action to fifty years earlier to the height of the Georgian era. This was the last of the silent film adaptations of the Maria Marten story, and its success paved the way for the 1935 sound film remake starring Tod Slaughter. A 35mm print of the 1928 silent film exists in the British Film Institute's archives.

== Plot ==
When his secret lover Maria Marten tells him she is pregnant with his child and asks him to marry her, the villainous Squire Corder murders her and buries her body in the red barn. The dead woman's ghost later visits her mother in a dream, and leads her to find her daughter's body, incriminating the squire.

== Cast ==
- Trilby Clark as Maria Marten
- Warwick Ward as Squire William Corder
- Dora Barton
- James Knight as Carlos
- Charles Ashton as Sam Giles
- Vesta Sylva as Ann Marten
- Frank Perfitt as John Marten
- Margot Armand as Lady Maud Derringham
- Judd Green as William Giles
- Tom Morris as Ishmael
- Chili Bouchier

== Bibliography ==
- Chapman, Gary. London's Hollywood: The Gainsborough Studio in the Silent Years. Edditt, 2014.
- Low, Rachael. History of the British Film, 1918-1929. George Allen & Unwin, 1971.
