= Dulcie Cooper =

Australian-born American stage actress

- Dulcie Cooper, 1925
- Born: Dulcie Mary Robinson; 3 November 1903; Sydney, New South Wales, Australia
- Died: 3 September 1981 (aged 79); New York City, New York, United States

Dulcie Cooper (3 November 1903 – 3 September 1981), briefly known as Dulcy Cooper, was an Australian-born American stage actress who also performed in silent movies and later in television.

== Early life ==
Dulcie Cooper was born Dulcie Mary Robinson in Sydney, New South Wales, Australia in 1903. Her father, Ashley Cooper (born Cecil Augustus Robinson), was a draftsman who later became interested in theater. Part of her girlhood was spent in California. While the family resided in Vancouver, British Columbia she was given some child roles. Known for her curly light blonde hair, she began to perform when she was only two and half years of age. She played little Eva many times and also played the part of Oliver Twist. When she was eight her parents opted to take her out of the theater. A few years later she attended a performance by Marjorie Rambeau at a theater in San Francisco. She was given the opportunity to play the star's daughter in a drama entitled Valley of Content. After this, her family relented and the youth returned to the theater.

== Career ==
Cooper came to Los Angeles where she played leads opposite Edward Everett Horton at the Majestic Theater for about seven months. Cooper's husband, Stafford Campbell, also played the Majestic in 1924, acting in support of Rambeau. A newspaper reporter noticed Dulcie's performances and advised the actress to go to New York. She made the trip and made her eastern debut in Little Spitfire in Newark, New Jersey. Soon she crossed the bay to Manhattan where she appeared in Courage, a play that ran a year on Broadway in 1928. She had a leading part in the cast of They Took The Town, which opened in Charleston, West Virginia in October 1936.

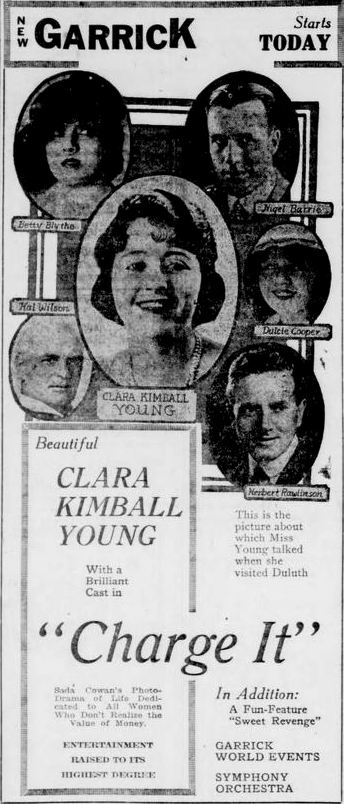
Newspaper ad for Charge It (1921) with picture of Cooper (center right).

Cooper felt that her early screen performances were sub par. She was signed by the Fox Film Corporation in the early 1920s and was later courted by both Paramount Pictures and Metro Goldwyn Mayer. She had roles in Charge It (1921), Live and Let Live (1921), What No Man Knows (1921), Desert Blossoms (1921), and Do and Dare (1922) with Tom Mix. Her last film was The Face on the Bar Room Floor (1932). On television, she appeared in the play Sorry, Wrong Number in 1946 and in an episode of The Phil Silvers Show in 1957.

In the 1960s, Cooper performed frequently with John Kenley's Kenley Players summer stock theater company in Ohio and Michigan. She played many character roles in musicals with the company, including Aunt Eller in Oklahoma! and Eulalie Shinn in The Music Man.

== Partial filmography ==
- Live and Let Live (1921)
- Desert Blossoms (1921)
- Do and Dare (1922)
- The Hands of Nara (1922)

== Death ==
Dulcie Cooper died in New York City in 1981, aged 77, from undisclosed causes.
