= The Face on the Barroom Floor (1932 film) =

1932 film

- Directed by: Bertram Bracken
- Written by: Aubrey M. Kennedy; Bertram Bracken; Barry Barringer
- Produced by: Aubrey M. Kennedy
- Starring: Dulcie Cooper; Bramwell Fletcher; Alice Ward
- Cinematography: Robert E. Cline
- Edited by: Ethel Davey
- Production company: Invincible Pictures
- Distributed by: Chesterfield Pictures
- Release date: October 14, 1932
- Running time: 65 minutes
- Country: United States
- Language: English

The Face on the Barroom Floor is a 1932 pre-Code American crime film directed by Bertram Bracken and starring Dulcie Cooper, Bramwell Fletcher and Alice Ward. The film was originally rejected by the British Board of Film Censors, but was later passed with an A certificate.

== Cast ==
- Dulcie Cooper as Mary Grove Bronson
- Bramwell Fletcher as Bill Bronson
- Alice Ward as Mrs. Grove
- Phillips Smalley as C.E. Grove
- Walter Miller as Sam Turner
- Maurice Black as Cesar Vanzetti
- Eddie Fetherston as 'Dr. Slick' Waters
- Pat Wing as Miss Lee, Turner's secretary

== Bibliography ==
- Pitts, Michael R. Poverty Row Studios, 1929-1940. McFarland & Company, 2005.
