= Silent Sanderson =

1925 film

- Directed by: Scott R. Dunlap
- Written by: Kate Corbaley; Harvey Gates
- Produced by: Hunt Stromberg
- Starring: Harry Carey
- Cinematography: Sol Polito
- Edited by: Harry L. Decker
- Distributed by: Producers Distributing Corporation
- Release date: April 13, 1925
- Running time: 50 minutes
- Country: United States
- Language: Silent (English intertitles)

Silent Sanderson is a 1925 American silent Western film featuring Harry Carey.

== Plot ==
As described in a film magazine review, Joel had loved Judith but had given her up to his brother, who asked her to marry him. The brother is found dead, slumped over a letter addressed to Judith, two days prior to their wedding day. Jim Downing, who had displayed his wealth to Judith and persuades her to marry him, had killed the brother. Joel, downhearted, goes to the Klondike to forget his trouble where he becomes known as Silent Sanderson. One year there makes him wealthy. Judith, disillusioned by her marriage to Jim, goes to the Klondike to become a dancer. Sanderson (Joel) hosts the crowd one night at the cafe because of his new claim, when Judith is attacked by a stranger. Joel protects her and takes her to his home, telling her that he will send her back South when the ice breaks. His hatred of her has remained during the time they have been apart. She tries to restore within him the love he once had for her, but fails. Wolves attack Joel and Judith saves him through dexterous use of a rifle. She nurses him through a long recovery. At the end of that time, Jim Downing wanders to Joel's house, suffering from snow blindness, searching for Judith. Not knowing the identity of his hosts, he is nursed back to health. Not revealing that he has recovered his eyesight, he suddenly attacks Joel. Judith again protects Joel. Desiring to end their struggle using their fists, Joel piles blows onto the man until he stumbles back out into the snow. There wolves set upon Jim and devour him. Joel and Judith find themselves together and are married.

== Cast ==
- Harry Carey as Joel Parsons / Silent Sanderson
- Trilby Clark as Judith Bensonn
- John Miljan as Jim Downing
- Gardner James as Art Parsons
- Edith Yorke as Mrs. Parsons
- Stanton Heck as Silver Smith
- Sheldon Lewis as Single Tooth Wilson

== See also ==
- Harry Carey filmography
