= The Fighting Streak =

1922 film

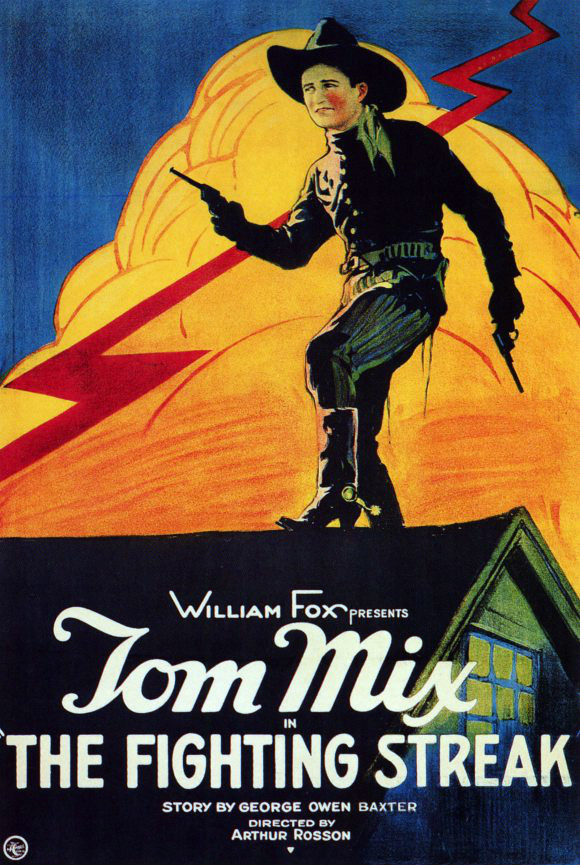
- Directed by: Arthur Rosson
- Written by: Max Brand (novel); Arthur Rosson
- Produced by: William Fox
- Starring: Tom Mix; Patsy Ruth Miller; Gerald Pring
- Cinematography: Daniel B. Clark
- Production company: Fox Film
- Distributed by: Fox Film
- Release date: May 14, 1922
- Running time: 50 minutes
- Country: United States
- Languages: Silent; English intertitles

The Fighting Streak is a 1922 American silent Western film directed by Arthur Rosson and starring Tom Mix, Patsy Ruth Miller and Gerald Pring.

== Cast ==
- Tom Mix as Andrew Lanning
- Patsy Ruth Miller as Ann Withero
- Gerald Pring as Charles Merchant
- Al Fremont as Jasper Lanning
- Sid Jordan as Bill Dozier
- Bert Sprotte as Hal Dozier
- Bob Fleming as Chick Heath
