= Trilby Clark =

Australian actress (1896–1983)

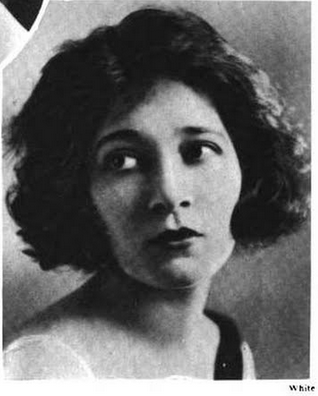
- Trilby Clark, from a 1921 publication.
- Born: Gwendolyn Gladys Blakely Clark; 30 August 1896; Adelaide, South Australia, Australia
- Died: 7 July 1983 (aged 86); London, United Kingdom
- Occupation: Actress
- Years active: 1920s–1930s
- Spouse(s): Nicolo Quattrociocchi (married: 1926); Ronald Ronnie Anker-Simmons (married: 1932)
- Parent(s): Mr. Edward Clark and Mrs. O. J. Herbert
- Relatives: Philip Strange (father-in-law)

Trilby Clark (born Gwendolyn Gladys Blakely Clark; 30 August 1896 – 7 July 1983) was an Australian actress who appeared in British films beginning in the silent film era. She was a leading lady in British films during the 1920s and early 1930s.

Trilby Clark was born in Adelaide, Australia, and died in London in 1983.

== Partial filmography ==
- The Breaking of the Drought (1920)
- Big Dan (1923)
- Hoodman Blind (1923)
- The Lover of Camille (1924)
- Just Off Broadway (1924)
- Silent Sanderson (1925)
- The Bad Lands (1925)
- The Prairie Pirate (1925)
- The Seventh Bandit (1925)
- Satan Town (1926)
- Carry On (1927)
- In the First Degree (1927)
- Maria Marten (1928)
- The Passing of Mr. Quin (1928)
- Chick (1928)
- God's Clay (1928)
- The Devil's Maze (1929)
- The Compulsory Husband (1930)
- Harmony Heaven (1930)
- The Squeaker (1930)
- The Night Porter (1930)

== See also ==
- W. H. Clark (brewer) – Family
