= Kate Corbaley =

American screenwriter

- Born: Kate Alaska Hinckley Hooper; September 1, 1878; Mazatlan, Mexico
- Died: September 23, 1938 (aged 60); Los Angeles, California, USA
- Education: Stanford University
- Occupation: Screenwriter
- Spouse: Charles Corbaley (div.)

Kate Corbaley (born Kate Alaska Hinckley Hooper) was a pioneering American screenwriter and development executive active from the silent era through her death in the 1930s.

== Biography ==
Kate was born at sea off the coast of Mazatlan, Mexico, to William Hooper and Mary Caldwell. Her family was financially well-off, and she attended Stanford University, where she studied English. After graduation, she taught at San Bernardino High School before marrying engineer Charles Corbaley. The pair had four daughters before divorcing 12 years later.

After the split, she turned to writing. She won several contests in the 1910s, went to work at MGM as a story editor after working for Mr. and Mrs. Sidney Drew. She wrote a string of films through the 1920s, and published a book on screenwriting called Selling Manuscripts in the Photoplay Market. She eventually became a consultant at the Palmer Photoplay Institute, and worked as a development executive, evaluating scripts and making them more commercial. She died on September 23, 1938, in her Cheviot Hills, Los Angeles, home after a brief illness.

== Selected filmography ==
- The Fire Brigade (1926)
- The Bad Lands (1925)
- Silent Sanderson (1925)
- The Girl of Gold (1925)
- Desert Blossoms (1921)
- Smoldering Embers (1920)
- The False Code (1919)
- Gates of Brass (1919)
- Mr. Briggs Closes the House (1918) (uncredited)
- Real Folks (1918)
