= The Bronze Bell =

1921 film

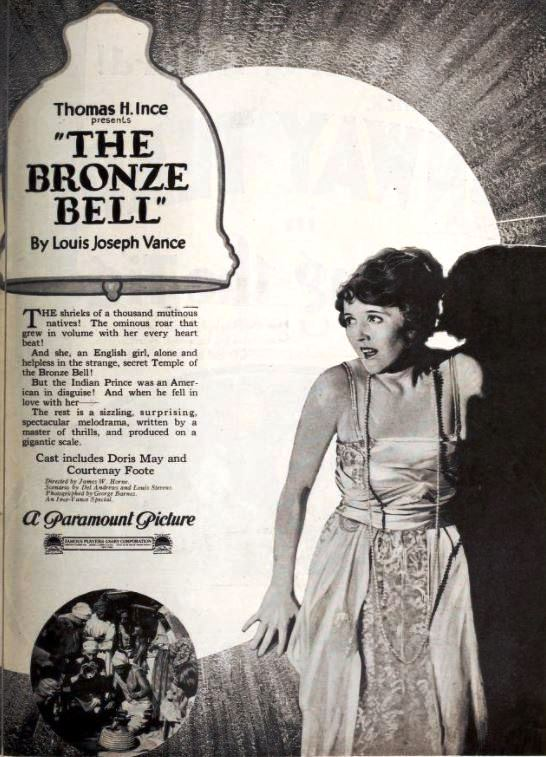
- Advertisement
- Directed by: James W. Horne
- Screenplay by: Del Andrews; Louis Stevens
- Based on: The Bronze Bell by Louis Joseph Vance
- Produced by: Thomas H. Ince
- Starring: Courtenay Foote; Doris May; John Davidson; Claire Du Brey; Noble Johnson; Otto Hoffman; Gerald Pring
- Cinematography: George Barnes
- Production companies: Thomas H. Ince Corporation; Famous Players–Lasky Corporation
- Distributed by: Paramount Pictures
- Release date: June 19, 1921
- Running time: 60 minutes
- Country: United States
- Language: Silent (English intertitles)

The Bronze Bell is a 1921 American silent drama film directed by James W. Horne and written by Del Andrews and Louis Stevens based upon a novel by Louis Joseph Vance. The film stars Courtenay Foote, Doris May, John Davidson, Claire Du Brey, Noble Johnson, Otto Hoffman, and Gerald Pring. The film was released on June 19, 1921, by Paramount Pictures.

A copy of The Bronze Bell is housed at the Library of Congress.

== Cast ==
- Courtenay Foote as Har Dyal Rutton / David Ambert
- Doris May as Sophia Farrell
- John Davidson as Salig Singh
- Claire Du Brey as Nairaini
- Noble Johnson as Chatterji
- Otto Hoffman as La Bertouche
- Gerald Pring as Captain Darrington
- C. Norman Hammond as Colonel Farrell
- Howard Crampton as Dogger
- Fred Huntley as Maharajah
