= June Madness =

1922 film by Harry Beaumont

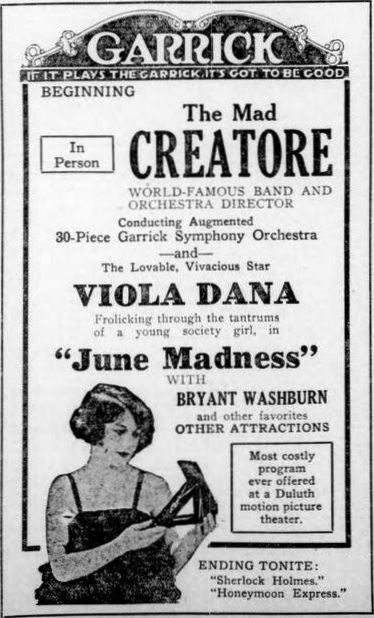
- Directed by: Harry Beaumont
- Written by: Harry Beaumont; Crosby George
- Starring: Viola Dana; Bryant Washburn; Gerald Pring
- Cinematography: John Arnold
- Production company: Metro Pictures
- Distributed by: Metro Pictures
- Release date: October 23, 1922
- Running time: 60 minutes
- Country: United States
- Language: Silent (English intertitles)

June Madness is a 1922 American silent comedy film directed by Harry Beaumont and starring Viola Dana, Bryant Washburn, and Gerald Pring.

== Cast ==
- Viola Dana as Clytie Whitmore
- Bryant Washburn as Ken Pauling
- Gerald Pring as Cadbury Todd II
- Léon Bary as Hamilton Peeke
- Eugenie Besserer as Mrs. Whitmore
- Snitz Edwards as Pennetti
- Anita Fraser as Mamie O'Gallagher

== Bibliography ==
- Munden, Kenneth White. The American Film Institute Catalog of Motion Pictures Produced in the United States, Part 1. University of California Press, 1997.
