= Live and Let Live (1921 film) =

1921 film directed by Christy Cabanne

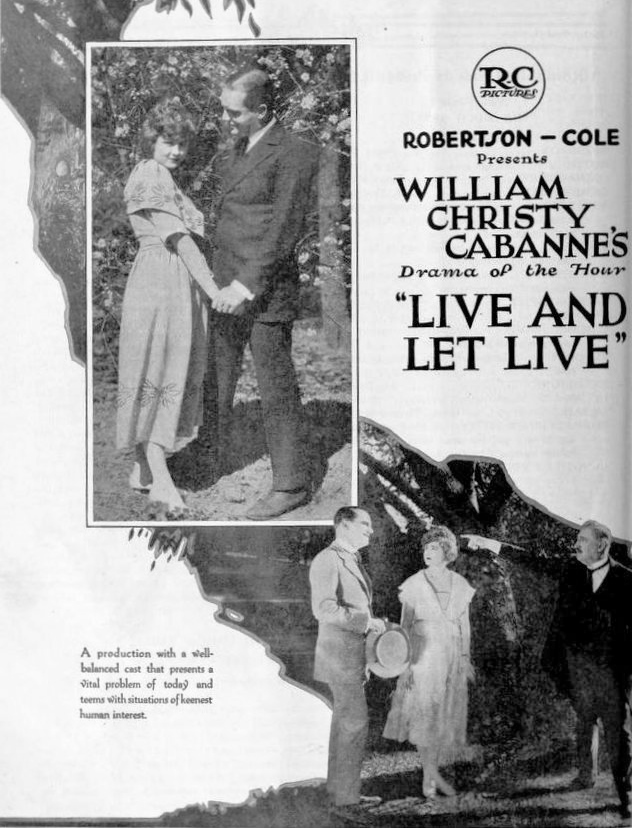
- Directed by: Christy Cabanne
- Written by: H. Tipton Steck; Christy Cabanne
- Starring: Harriet Hammond; George Nichols; Dulcie Cooper
- Cinematography: Georges Benoit
- Production company: Robertson-Cole Co.
- Distributed by: R-C Pictures
- Release date: July 3, 1921 (US)
- Running time: 6 reels
- Country: United States
- Language: English

Live and Let Live is a 1921 silent American melodrama film, directed by Christy Cabanne. It stars Harriet Hammond, George Nichols, and Dulcie Cooper, and was released on July 3, 1921.

== Cast ==
- Harriet Hammond as Mary Ryan
- George Nichols as Judge Loomis
- Dulcie Cooper as Jane Loomis
- Harris Gordon as Donald Loomis
- Gerald Pring as Albert Watson
- Dave Winter as Dr. Randall
- Helen Lynch as Lillian Boland
- Josephine Crowell as Mrs. Boland
- Cora Drew as Mrs. Randall
- Helen Muir as The Widow Jones
