= Beyond the Border (1925 film) =

1925 film

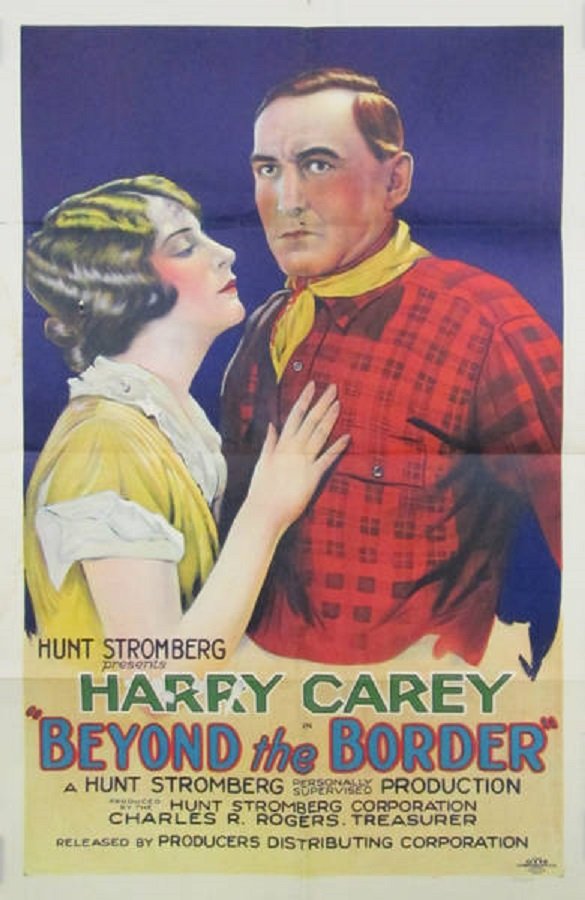
- Theatrical poster
- Directed by: Scott R. Dunlap
- Written by: Meredith Davis; Harvey Gates
- Produced by: Hunt Stromberg
- Starring: Harry Carey
- Cinematography: Georges Benoît; Sol Polito
- Edited by: Lou L. Ostrow
- Distributed by: Producers Distributing Corporation
- Release date: March 2, 1925
- Running time: 58 minutes
- Country: United States
- Languages: Silent; English intertitles

Beyond the Border is a 1925 American silent Western film directed by Scott R. Dunlap, produced by Hunt Stromberg and starring Harry Carey. It was released by Producers Distributing Corporation. A print of Beyond the Border exists.

== Plot ==
As described in a film magazine review, while Sheriff Bob Smith is away from town going after the bandit Bob Moore, the villain has a new sheriff elected in his place. Captured, tried, and convicted, Moore confesses that he is also known as "Bob Smith" and that his sister, whom he has not seen in childhood, is coming to town. Moore proposes that Smith pose as him so that his long-lost sister will not know that her brother is actually an outlaw. Smith agrees, and upon meeting her falls in love with her. He rounds up the villain's gang, gets his sheriff's job back, and wins the young woman after saving her real brother.

== Cast ==
- Harry Carey as Bob Smith
- William Scott as Bob Moore
- Mildred Harris as Molly Smith
- Tom Santschi as Nick Perdue
- Jack Richardson as Brick Dawson
- Joe Rickson as Deputy (credited as Joseph Rickson)
- Neola May as Housekeeper (credited as Princess Neola)
- Victor Potel as Man with smallpox (credited as Vic Potel)

== See also ==
- List of American films of 1925
