= The Bad Lands =

1925 film directed by Dell Henderson

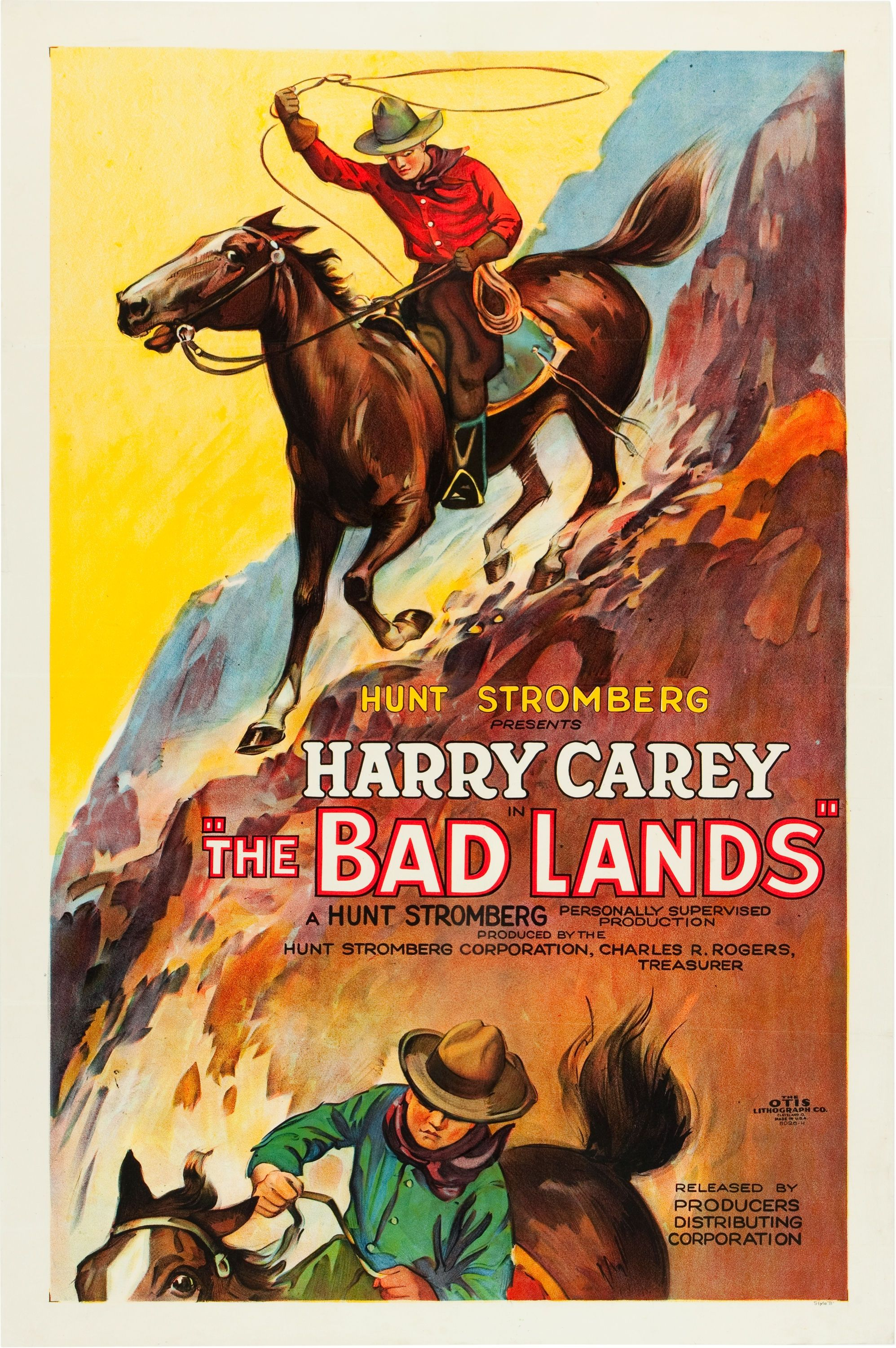
- Film poster
- Directed by: Dell Henderson
- Written by: Kate Corbaley; Harvey Gates
- Produced by: Hunt Stromberg
- Starring: Harry Carey
- Cinematography: Georges Benoît; Sol Polito
- Distributed by: Producers Distributing Corporation
- Release date: July 15, 1925
- Running time: 1 hour
- Country: United States
- Language: Silent (English intertitles)

The Bad Lands is a 1925 American silent Western film directed by Dell Henderson and featuring Harry Carey.

== Plot ==
As described in a film magazine reviews, Patrick Angus O’Toole reaches the fort where he has been assigned to clear up a lot of smuggling. Mary, the daughter of Colonel Owen, is wooed by Captain Blake, although she admires O’Toole. Her younger brother, Hal Owen, becomes indebted by gambling to Blake. Blake is jealous of O’Toole and therefore takes revenge on Hal by demanding payment of the debts within 24 hours. Hal attempts a stage coach robbery to get the money. O’Toole arrives in time to see the stage driver shot by a stray bullet. The money bags are later found in O’Toole’s room and he is put in prison. In an Indian attack, Hal is shot and, on his death bed, confesses to the robbery. O’Toole is cleared of the criminal charges and openly courts the young woman. Mary reciprocates his love.

== Cast ==
- Harry Carey as Patrick Angus O'Toole
- Wilfred Lucas as Col. Owen
- Lee Shumway as Capt. Blake
- Gaston Glass as Hal Owen
- Joe Rickson as Charlie Squirrel
- Trilby Clark as Mary Owen
- Buck Black as Freckles
