= Soft Shoes =

1925 film

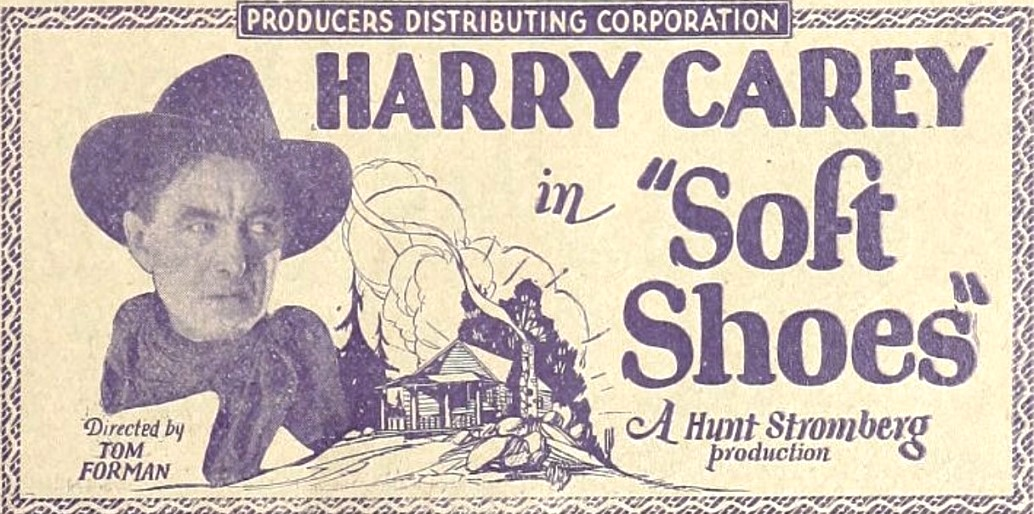
- Advertisement
- Directed by: Lloyd Ingraham
- Written by: Harry Carey; Hunt Stromberg
- Story by: Harvey Gates
- Produced by: Hunt Stromberg
- Starring: Harry Carey
- Cinematography: Sol Polito
- Edited by: Harry L. Decker
- Distributed by: Producers Distributing Corporation
- Release date: January 1, 1925
- Running time: 60 minutes
- Country: United States
- Language: Silent (English intertitles)

Soft Shoes is a 1925 American silent drama film directed by Lloyd Ingraham and featuring Harry Carey.

== Plot ==
Soft Shoes (1925)

As described in a film magazine review, Pat Halahan, Sheriff of Boulder, goes to San Francisco to see the sights. He meets Faith O’Day, in league with a gang of crooks. Faith decides to go straight, and Pat with the aid of the police rounds up the gang in a last desperate encounter.

== Cast ==
- Harry Carey as Pat Halahan
- Lillian Rich as Faith O'Day
- Paul Weigel as Dummy O'Day
- Francis Ford as Quig Mundy
- Stanton Heck as Bradley
- Harriet Hammond as Mrs. Bradley
- James Quinn as Majel (as Jimmie Quinn)
- Sōjin Kamiyama as Yet Tzu
- Majel Coleman as Mabel Packer
- John Steppling as Markham

== Preservation ==
A copy of Soft Shoes survives at Národní Filmový Archiv in Prague and was screened at San Francisco Silent Film Festival on May 31, 2018.

== See also ==
- Harry Carey filmography
