= The Fire Patrol =

1924 film by Hunt Stromberg

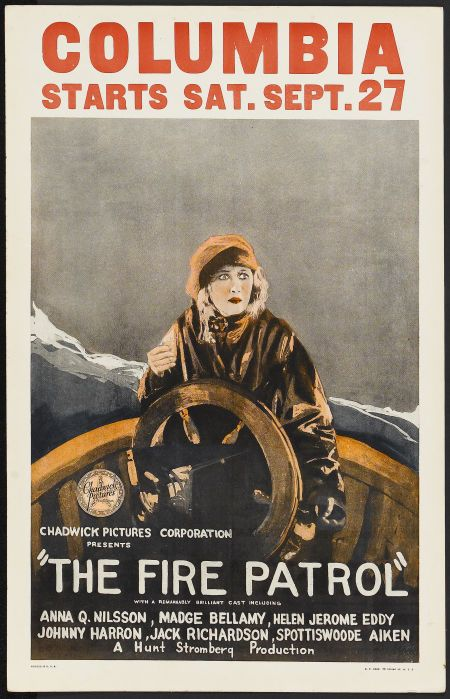
- Directed by: Hunt Stromberg
- Written by: Garrett Fort
- Based on: The Fire Patrol by James W. Harkins and Edwin Barbour
- Produced by: Hunt Stromberg
- Starring: Anna Q. Nilsson; Madge Bellamy; Helen Jerome Eddy; John Harron
- Cinematography: Silvano Balboni
- Production company: Hunt Stromberg Productions
- Distributed by: Chadwick Pictures
- Release date: August 15, 1924
- Running time: 70 minutes; 7 reels
- Country: United States
- Language: Silent (English intertitles)

The Fire Patrol is surviving 1924 American silent melodrama film directed by Hunt Stromberg and starring Anna Q. Nilsson that was based upon the 1891 play of the same name by James W. Harkins and Edwin Barbour. Stromberg also produced the film and released it through Chadwick Pictures.

== Cast ==
- Anna Q. Nilsson as Mary Ferguson
- William Jeffries as Captain John Ferguson, (Prologue)
- Spottiswoode Aitken as Capt. John Ferguson (Later)
- Jack Richardson as "Butch" Anderson
- Madge Bellamy as Molly Thatcher
- Helen Jerome Eddy as Emma Thatcher
- Dick Brandon as Colin Ferguson (Prologue)
- John Harron as Colin Ferguson (Later)
- Gale Henry as Alice Masters
- Frances Ross as Village Belle
- Chester Conklin as Fireman
- Bull Montana as Fireman
- Charlie Murray as Fireman
- Heinie Conklin as Fireman (uncredited)
- Billy Franey as Fireman (uncredited)
- Hank Mann as Fireman (uncredited)

== Censorship ==
Before The Fire Patrol could be exhibited in Kansas, the Kansas Board of Review required the removal of a scene where a black man was choking a white man, seen through a window.

== Preservation ==
A copy of The Fire Patrol is preserved at La Corse Et Le Cinema, Porto Vecchio.
