= Gerald Pring =

British actor (1888–1970)

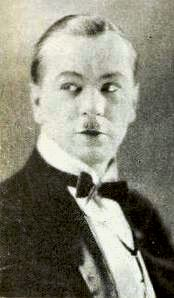
- Born: 16 March 1888; Twickenham, Middlesex, United Kingdom
- Died: 21 October 1970 (aged 82); Marylebone, London, United Kingdom
- Occupation: Actor
- Years active: 1917–1952 (film)

Gerald Pring (1888–1970) was a British stage and film actor. He played a number of supporting roles in British and American films during the silent and sound eras.

In 1930 he appeared in the West End in the comedy Almost a Honeymoon.

== Selected filmography ==
- The Lady of the Photograph (1917)
- Milestones (1920)
- The Palace of Darkened Windows (1920)
- The Nut (1921)
- Desert Blossoms (1921)
- Live and Let Live (1921)
- The Bronze Bell (1921)
- The Fighting Streak (1922)
- Man Under Cover (1922)
- June Madness (1922)
- Confidence (1922)
- Broken Chains (1922)
- Always the Woman (1922)
- Bolibar (1928)
- Three Witnesses (1935)
- Well Done, Henry (1936)
- The Dark Eyes of London (1939)
- The Echo Murders (1945)
- Loyal Heart (1946)
- The Secret Tunnel (1947)
- Black Memory (1947)
- My Brother's Keeper (1948)
- No Way Back (1949)

== Bibliography ==
- Jeffrey Vance & Tony Maietta. Douglas Fairbanks. University of California Press, 2008.
- Wearing, J. P. The London Stage 1930-1939: A Calendar of Productions, Performers, and Personnel. Rowman & Littlefield, 2014.
