= Charles Kenyon =

American screenwriter

- Born: November 2, 1880; San Francisco, California, U.S.
- Died: June 27, 1961 (aged 80); Hollywood, California, U.S.
- Occupation: Screenwriter
- Years active: 1915–1946

Charles Kenyon (November 2, 1880 – June 27, 1961) was an American screenwriter, who wrote or co-wrote the screenplays for more than 110 films between 1915 and 1946. He was married to actress Jane Winton from 1927 to 1930. Kenyon was born in San Francisco, California and died in Hollywood, California.

== Partial filmography ==
- Mignon (1915)
- Kindling (1915)
- The Fighting Grin (1918)
- Cupid's Round Up (1918)
- The Moral Law (1918)
- Painted Lips (1918)
- Nobody's Wife (1918)
- The Claim (1918)
- Wings of the Morning (1919)
- The Feud (1919)
- Married in Haste (1919)
- The Wilderness Trail (1919)
- The Penalty (1920)
- Stop Thief! (1920)
- A Tale of Two Worlds (1921)
- The Invisible Power (1921)
- Beating the Game (1921)
- The Dust Flower (1922)
- The Christian (1923)
- Second Hand Love (1923)
- Railroaded (1923)
- Brass Commandments (1923)
- White Tiger (1923)
- Hoodman Blind (1923)
- The Lone Chance (1924)
- The Desert Outlaw (1924)
- The Iron Horse (1924)
- Hearts of Oak (1924)
- Dick Turpin (1925)
- Scandal Proof (1925)
- The Old Soak (1926)
- The Still Alarm (1926)
- The Foreign Legion (1928)
- Jazz Mad (1928)
- The Crash (1928)
- Girl on the Barge (1929)
- Show Boat (1929)
- Recaptured Love (1930)
- The Office Wife (1930)
- My Past (1931)
- Party Husband (1931)
- Street of Women (1932)
- Dr. Monica (1934)
- The Goose and the Gander (1935)
- A Midsummer Night's Dream (1935)
- The Petrified Forest (1936)
- The Golden Arrow (1936)
- One Hundred Men and a Girl (1937)
- The Road to Reno (1938)
- The Lady Objects (1938)
- Highway West (1941)
- The Unwritten Code (1944)
- Strange Journey (1946)
