= Man and Maid =

1925 film by Victor Schertzinger

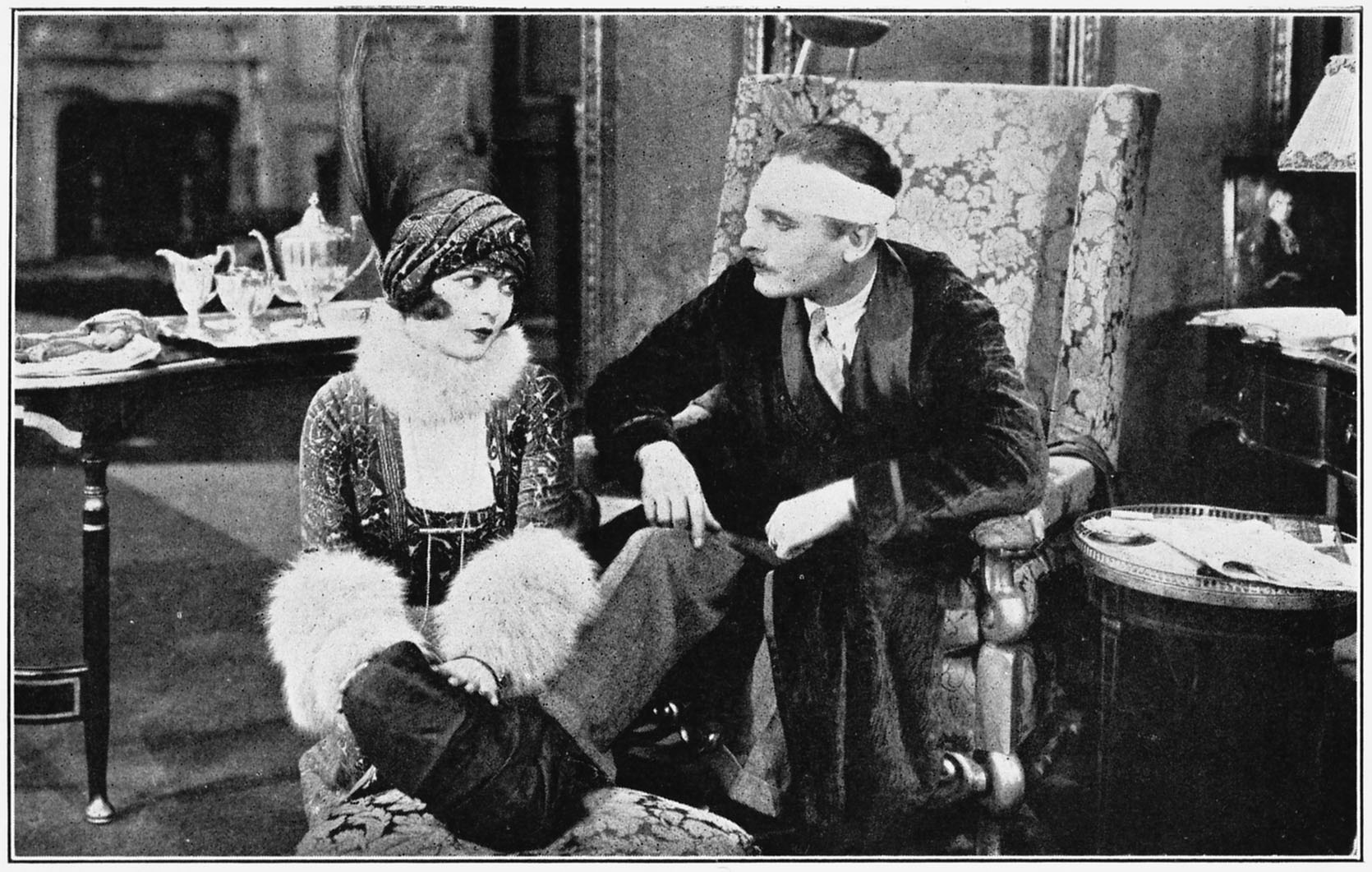
- Suzette (Renée Adorée) makes the tedious hours of the wounded Sir Nicholas Thormonde (Lew Cody) seem less monotonous.
- Directed by: Victor Schertzinger
- Written by: Elinor Glyn
- Starring: Lew Cody; Renée Adorée; Harriet Hammond
- Cinematography: Chester A. Lyons
- Distributed by: Metro-Goldwyn-Mayer
- Release date: April 20, 1925
- Running time: 60 minutes
- Country: United States
- Languages: Silent; English intertitles

Man and Maid is a 1925 drama film directed by Victor Schertzinger based on a 1922 novel by Elinor Glyn. The film stars Lew Cody, Renée Adorée and Harriet Hammond.

== Plot ==
Boulevardier Sir Nicholas Thormonde is torn between his mistress Suzette and his virtuous secretary Alathea in wartimе Paris.

== Cast ==
- Lew Cody - Sir Nicholas Thormonde
- Renée Adorée - Suzette
- Harriet Hammond - Alathea Bulteel
- Paulette Duval - Coralie
- Alec B. Francis - Burton
- Crauford Kent - Col. George Harcourt
- David Mir - Maurice
- Jacqueline Gadsden - Lady Hilda Buiteel
- Winston Miller - Little Bobby
- Jane Mercer - Little Hilda
- Irving Hartley - Atwood Chester

== Preservation ==
In February of 2021, Man and Maid was cited by the National Film Preservation Board on their Lost U.S. Silent Feature Films list and is therefore presumed lost.
