= The Midshipman =

1925 film

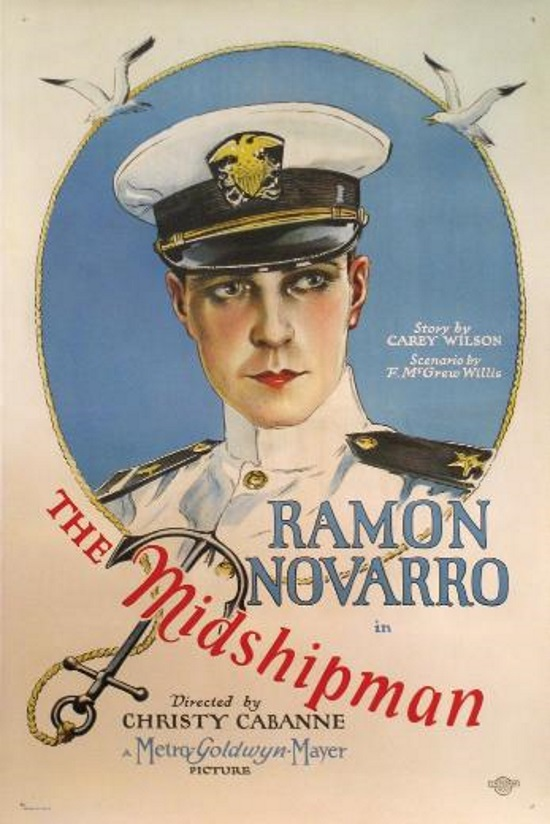
- Theatrical release poster
- Directed by: Christy Cabanne
- Written by: F. McGrew Willis
- Story by: Carey Wilson
- Starring: Ramon Novarro; Harriet Hammond
- Cinematography: Oliver Marsh
- Distributed by: Metro-Goldwyn-Mayer
- Release date: October 4, 1925
- Running time: 80 minutes; 8 reels at 7,498 feet
- Country: United States
- Language: Silent (English intertitles)

The Midshipman is a 1925 American silent romantic drama film directed by Christy Cabanne. The film stars Ramon Novarro and Harriet Hammond. Joan Crawford had an early uncredited role as an extra.

== Plot ==
James Randall, a second year upperclassman at the Naval Academy, befriends plebe Ted Lawrence. At an Academy dance, James meets and falls in love with Ted's sister Patricia. She is engaged to Basil Courtney, a wealthy reprobate who arranges with Rita to discredit James. On the night of the big dance, Rita goes to the guardhouse where James is scheduled to be on duty and arranges to be found with him. Ted has taken his place on duty, however, and James sees Ted with Rita in the guardhouse. Honor-bound to report Ted for violating Academy rules, James decides instead to resign. Courtney abducts Patricia on his yacht, and James rescues her. James discovers Rita's complicity in Courtney's schemes and decides to stay at the Academy, marrying Patricia upon his graduation.

== Cast ==
- Ramon Novarro as James Randall
- Harriet Hammond as Patricia Lawrence
- Wesley Barry as Ted Lawrence
- Margaret Seddon as Mrs. Randall
- Crauford Kent as Basil Courtney
- Pauline Key as Rita
- Maurice Ryan as Fat
- Harold Goodwin as Tex
- William Boyd as Spud
- Joan Crawford as Driver of Police Car (uncredited extra)

== Production ==
Much of The Midshipman was filmed on location at the United States Naval Academy with the cooperation of the Department of the Navy, allowing the use of the Brigade of Midshipmen as extras. For the graduation scene, Novarro receives a dummy diploma from Secretary of the Navy Curtis D. Wilbur. At the actual 1925 Naval Academy graduation event, President Calvin Coolidge presented diplomas to the regular graduates and Navarro was not in line to receive one. His diploma scene was filmed immediately after the President and most midshipmen had left for other graduation week events.

== Preservation ==
A print of The Midshipman is preserved in the George Eastman Museum Motion Picture Collection.
