= The Amateur Adventuress =

1919 film by Henry Otto

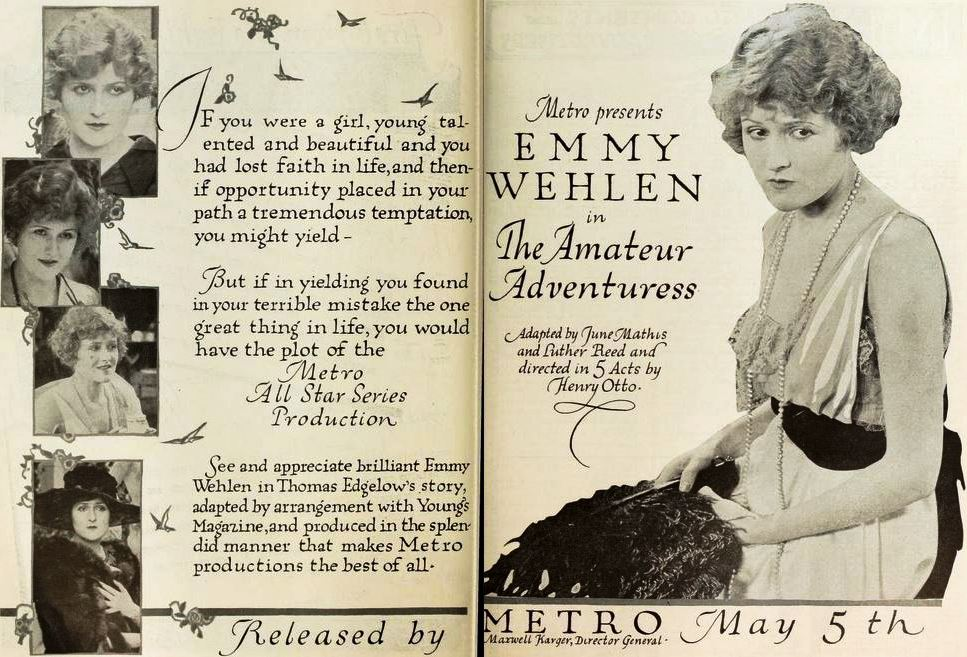
- Directed by: Henry Otto
- Written by: June Mathis; Luther Reed
- Based on: The Amateur Adventuress by Thomas Edgelow
- Produced by: Maxwell Karger
- Starring: Emmy Wehlen
- Cinematography: Arthur Martinelli
- Production company: Metro Pictures
- Distributed by: Metro Pictures
- Release date: May 28, 1919
- Running time: 5 reels
- Country: United States
- Language: Silent (English intertitles)

The Amateur Adventuress is a lost 1919 American silent comedy film directed by Henry Otto and starring Emmy Wehlen. It is based on a short story by Thomas Edgelow that appeared in Young's Magazine (Oct. 1918). Maxwell Karger produced with release through Metro Pictures.

== Cast ==
- Emmy Wehlen as Norma Wood
- Allan Sears as Oliver Morley
- Eugene Pallette as George Goodie
- William V. Mong as William Claxtonbury
- Marian Skinner as Mrs. Claxtonbury
- Lucille Ward as Mrs. Sentel
- Victor Potel as Gregory Charles Sentel
- Rosemary Theby as Flossie
- Bonnie Hill in a bit part (uncredited)
