= His Bonded Wife =

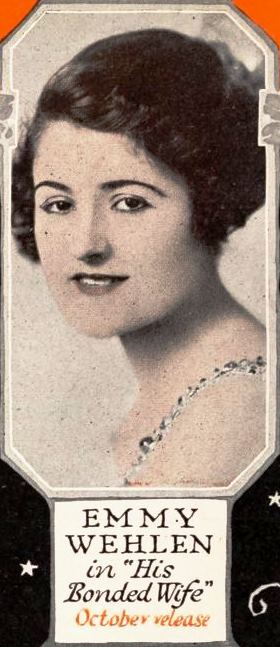
- period advertisement
- Directed by: Charles Brabin
- Written by: June Mathis (scenario)
- Story by: Lois Zellner; Arthur J. Zellner
- Produced by: Maxwell Karger
- Starring: Emmy Wehlen
- Cinematography: Rudolph J. Bergquist
- Distributed by: Metro Pictures
- Release date: October 14, 1918
- Running time: 5 reels
- Country: USA

His Bonded Wife is a lost 1918 silent film comedy drama directed by Charles Brabin and starring Emmy Wehlen. It was produced by Maxwell Karger and distributed through Metro Pictures.

== Cast ==
- Emmy Wehlen as Doris Morse
- Frank Currier as Digby Morse
- Creighton Hale as Philip Hazard
- John Terry as Tom Lloyd
- Wanda Howard as Kate
