= C. Morton Horne =

Irish writer and actor

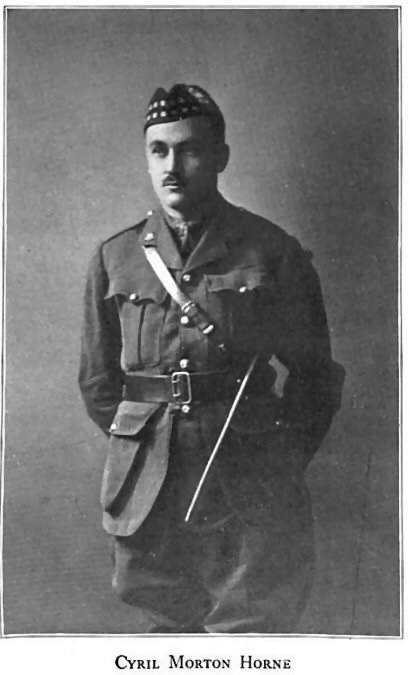
- Birth name: Cyril Morton Horne
- Born: 1885
- Died: 1916 (aged 30–31)
- Allegiance: United Kingdom
- Branch: British Army
- Rank: Captain
- Commands: King's Own Scottish Borderers
- Conflicts: First World War

C. Morton Horne (1885–1916) was an Irish writer and musical comedy performer who lost his life on a battlefield in France during the First World War.

== Biography ==
Cyril Henry Morton Horne's birth was recorded in the spring of 1885 in the Weston District of Dublin. His first major role most likely came in early 1910 as Lieutenant Varga in The Balkan Princess at London's Prince of Wales Theatre. Later that year Horne traveled to America aboard the SS Amerika. where he would appear in four Broadway musical productions over the next few seasons. Horne played The Honorable Richard Mirables opposite Emmy Wehlen in Marriage a la Carte at the Casino Theatre in January, 1911. In November of that year Horn began a successful run as Captain Graham in Little Boy Blue at the Lyric Theatre and later at the Grand Opera House. He played Billy Brand in the less than successful production of The Charity Girl staged at the Globe Theatre in October, 1912. Horne's final Broadway performance came in the spring of 1913 at the Globe Theatre as Capt. Etienne de Bouvray in a revival of Mlle. Modiste

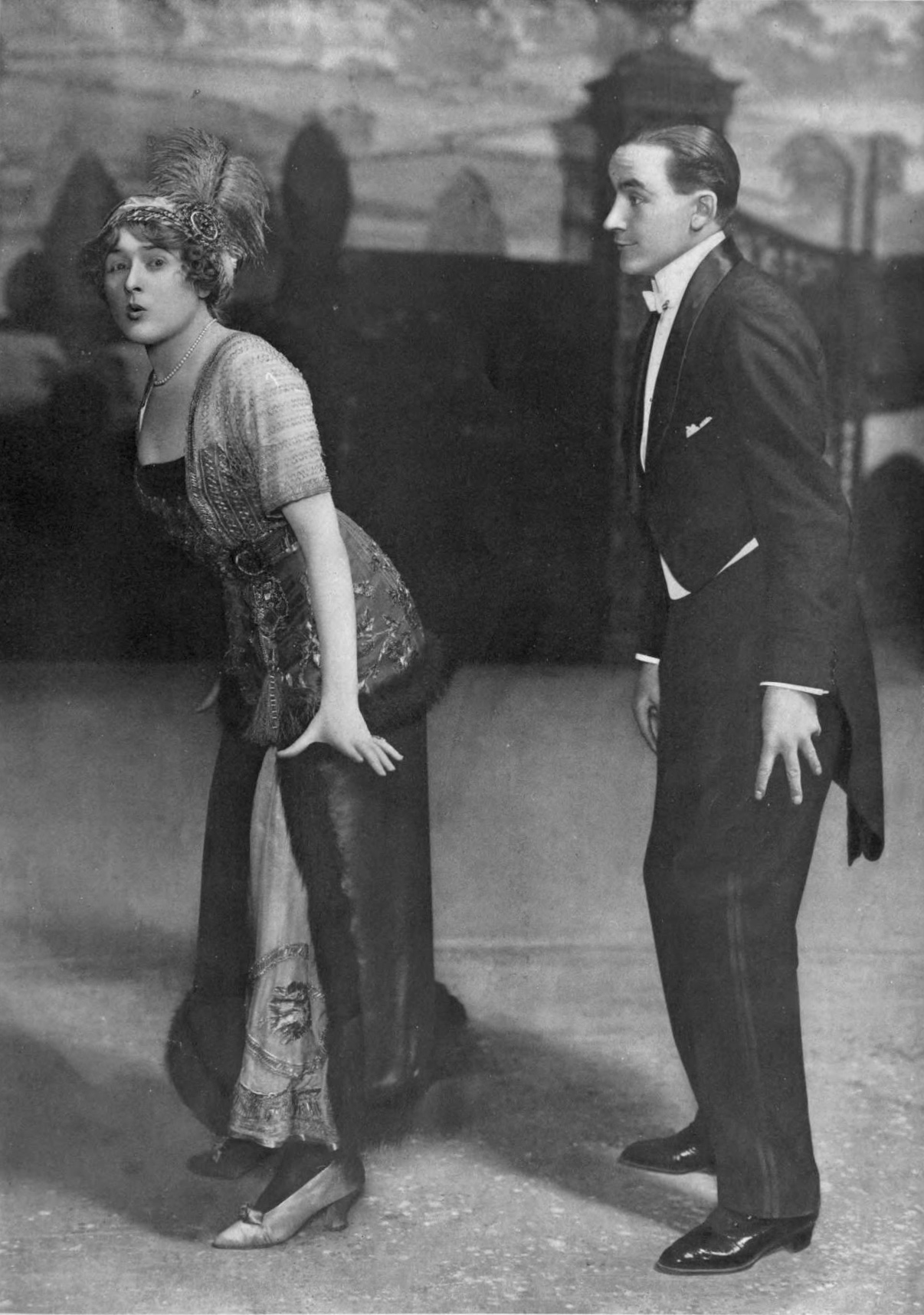
Horne with Emmy Wehlen in Marriage a la Carte

In January, 1915 Horne sailed for Britain aboard the SS Megantic to join the struggle in Europe. Over the last year of his life Horne wrote a number of songs and poems that were later compiled and published under the title Songs of the Shrapnel Shell, and Other Verse. The following comes from the book's foreword:

Cyril Morton Horne, late Captain of the Seventh Battalion, King's Own Scottish Borderers, was killed in action, fighting with His Majesty's troops, "Somewhere in France," 27 January 1916. Many of these verses were written in the trenches, between attack and counter-attack, with the shrapnel shells shrieking overhead, with mines and countermines exploding underneath, with the ever constant, surging gray tide of charging infantry threatening at any moment to overwhelm his command. Living for more than a year half-underground, like the moles he so vividly pictures in one of his poems, with the chances a thousand to one against him of ever emerging from the great conflict alive, he wrote these little verses, some of them scribbled in pencil upon scraps of paper, and sent them, one by one, to the woman across the seas to whom he had said good-by when his country called. Captain Horne was but twenty-nine years of age when he was killed under most dramatic circumstances. He gave up his life trying to rescue a wounded British soldier lying in front of the trenches. A shrapnel shell exploded overhead just as his comrades were ready to cheer him for his heroic rescue.

Horne married fellow fellow actor Marie Ashton on 9 April 2011. She was performing as the character "Pleasure" for the play Experience when she received news of his death. His permanent address listed in his probate records was 16 Palmerston – park, Dublin, Ireland. She later married fellow actor Ernest Glendinning in 1919, with the marriage lasting until his death.
