= Lifting Shadows (film) =

1920 film

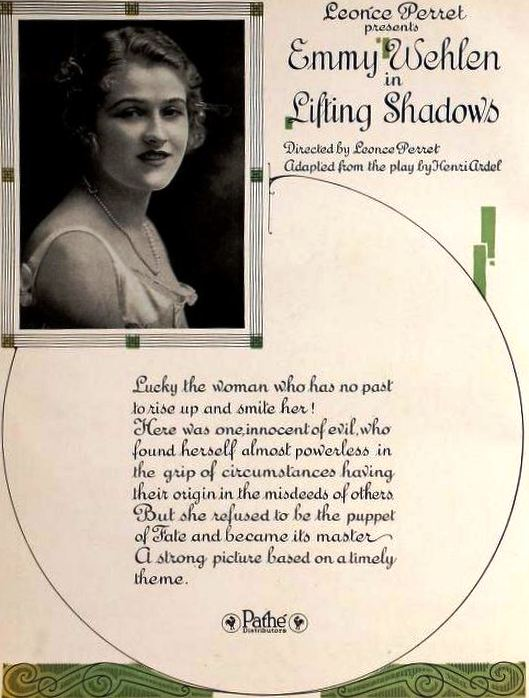
- Directed by: Léonce Perret
- Written by: Henri Ardel; Léonce Perret
- Starring: Emmy Wehlen; Stuart Holmes; Wyndham Standing
- Cinematography: Alfred Ortlieb
- Production company: Léonce Perret Productions
- Distributed by: Pathé Exchange
- Release date: April 4, 1920
- Running time: 50 minutes
- Country: United States
- Languages: Silent; English intertitles

Lifting Shadows is a 1920 American silent drama film directed by Léonce Perret and starring Emmy Wehlen, Stuart Holmes and Wyndham Standing.

== Plot ==
Serge Ostowski is killed by one of his own bombs during a clandestine operation. Vania later witnesses Serge's death, fleeing political persecution in Russia, escaping as a refugee to the US, carrying papers that mark her as a target for the group of assassins known as the "Ring of Death".

Vania marries Clifford Howard, a drug-stricken writer upon her arrival in the US. Howard's addiction begins to escalate, later turning into a nightmare of abuse. A brutal attack occurs one night, Vania shoots and kills him. Vania is charged with murder and stands trial. Defense attorney Hugh Mason, believing in her innocence, eventually falls in love with his client. Vania fails to tell the truth for the fear of losing his love. The Ring of Death continues their hunt throughout the trial, Hugh hires detectives for protection. Revolutionaries pursue Vania to America to seize the papers, symbolizing Vania's entrapment by her past. An assassin breaks into her home and then is fatally shot by a detective. He confesses to killing Howard after Vania's shot wounded him, thus freeing her to accept Hugh's love.

== Cast ==
- Emmy Wehlen as Vania
- Stuart Holmes as Clifford Howard
- Wyndham Standing as Hugh Mason
- Julia Swayne Gordon as Countess Vera Lobanoff
- F. French as Gregory Lobanoff
- Rafael Bongini as Serge Ostrowski

== Bibliography ==
- Michael Slade Shull. Radicalism in American Silent Films, 1909-1929: A Filmography and History. McFarland, 2015.
