= Edwin L. Hollywood =

American director (1892-1958)

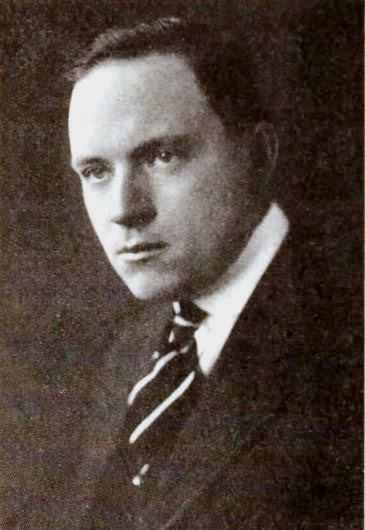

Edwin L. Hollywood (October 9, 1892 – May 15, 1958) was an American actor and film director. He was born in New York City.

Hollywood was in charge of Vitagraph's film unit that starred Harry Morey.

He died in Glendale, California.

== Filmography ==
=== Actor ===
- The Heart of the Blue Ridge (1915)

=== Director ===
- One Hour (1917)
- Polly of the Circus (1917), Charles Thomas Horan also directed
- The Challenge Accepted (1918)
- The Birth of a Soul (1920)
- The Sea Rider (1920)
- The Flaming Clue (1920)
- The Gauntlet (1920)
- French Heels (1922)
- No Trespassing (1922)
- Columbus (1923)
- The Pilgrims (1924)
