= No Trespassing (1922 film) =

1922 film

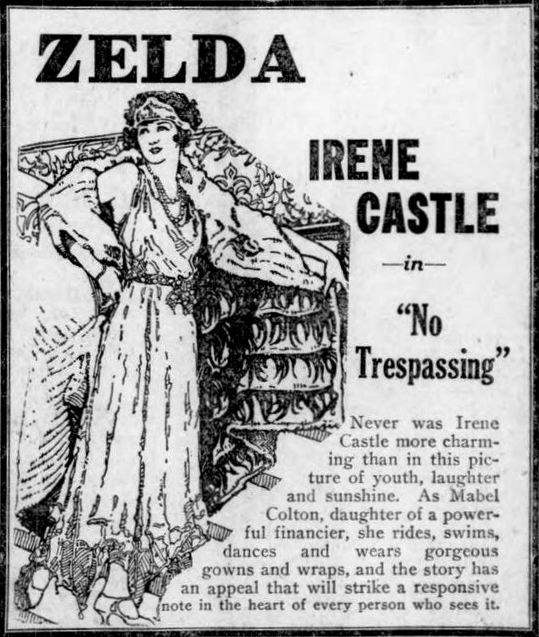
- Newspaper advertisement
- Directed by: Edwin L. Hollywood
- Written by: Howard Irving Young
- Based on: The Rise of Roscoe Paine by Joseph C. Lincoln
- Produced by: Holtre Productions
- Starring: Irene Castle; Ward Crane
- Cinematography: Robert A. Stuart
- Distributed by: W. W. Hodkinson Corporation
- Release date: June 11, 1922
- Running time: 7 reels
- Country: United States
- Language: Silent (English intertitles)

No Trespassing is a lost 1922 American silent drama film directed by Edwin L. Hollywood and starring Irene Castle and Ward Crane. It was distributed by W. W. Hodkinson and is based upon a novel by Joseph C. Lincoln, The Rise of Roscoe Paine.

== Plot ==
As described in a film magazine, Roscoe Paine (Crane), a wealthy young man with no job and little ambition who lives with his invalid mother (Barry) in a small fishing village, owns a lane leading to the shore which skirts the wealthy James Colton (Truesdale) property. Debutante Mabel Colton (Castle) and her father James and her mother (Fitzroy) are newly arrived to the village, and the passing of the fish carts on the lane annoys Mrs. Colton. The father thereupon tries to purchase the lane, but Roscoe refuses to close it to his friends and neighbors. Roscoe and Mabel become friends after he saves her from a runaway horse. Victor Carver (Roscoe), a suitor for Mabel's hand, attempts to ruin her father in a stock deal, but Roscoe engineers a counter stock deal during the illness of James, which saves his fortune. Roscoe also sells the lane to James Colton to raise money to save his friend George Davis (Pauncefort), a cashier at the local bank, from disgrace. The townspeople want to run Roscoe out of town until the truth is known and he is vindicated by Mabel and her father. Roscoe gets a good job in her father's offices, and he and Mabel get engaged.

== Cast ==
- Irene Castle as Mabel Colton
- Howard Truesdale as James Colton
- Emily Fitzroy as Mrs. James Colton
- Ward Crane as Roscoe Paine
- Eleanor Barry as Mrs. Paine
- Blanche Frederici as Dorinda
- Charles Eldridge as Lute
- Leslie Stowe as Captain Dean
- Betty Bouton as Nellie Dean
- Alan Roscoe as Victor Carver
- Harry Fisher as Simeon Eldridge
- George Pauncefort as George Davis

== Reception ==
Variety gave No Trespassing a poor review: "This latest Castle feature cannot be relied upon as a real money-maker."
