= Sowers and Reapers =

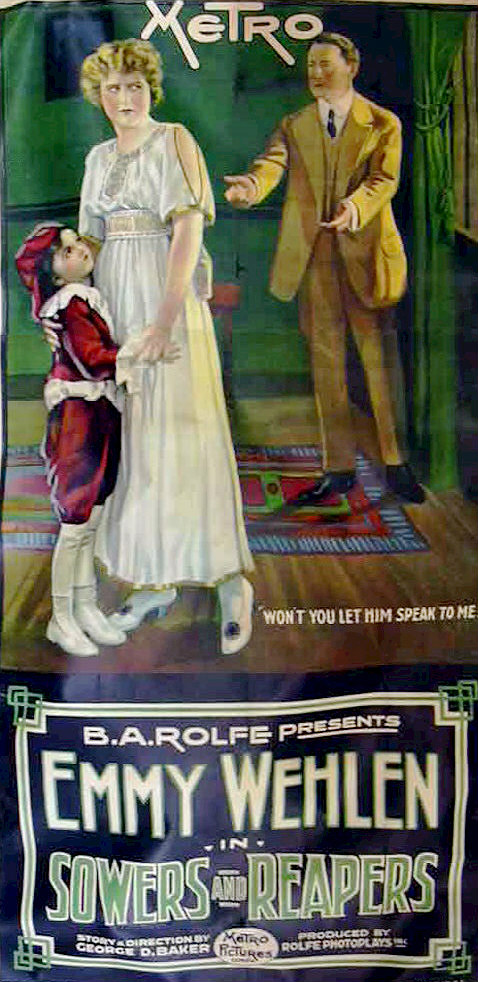
- Film poster
- Directed by: George D. Baker; Charles J. Hunt (assistant director)
- Written by: George D. Baker
- Starring: Emmy Wehlen
- Cinematography: Joseph Shelderfer
- Production company: Rolfe Photoplays
- Distributed by: Metro Pictures
- Release date: May 7, 1917
- Running time: 5 reels
- Country: USA
- Language: Silent film (English intertitles)

Sowers and Reapers is a lost 1917 silent film feature produced by Rolfe Photoplays and distributed by Metro Pictures. George D. Baker directed and Emmy Wehlen starred.

== Cast ==
- Emmy Wehlen as Annie Leigh
- George Christie as Earle Courtney
- Frank Currier as Major James Courtney
- Peggy Parr as Sadie Jones
- Harry Davenport as Henry Ainsworth
- Claire McCormack as Ella Burt
- Emanuel A. Turner as Paul Rooubais
- Walter Horton as Len Peters
- Kate Blancke as Mrs. Leigh
- David Thompson as William Jenkins
- Grace Saum as Ethel Ainsworth (credited as Grace Saums)
