= The Pretenders (1916 film) =

1916 film by George D. Baker

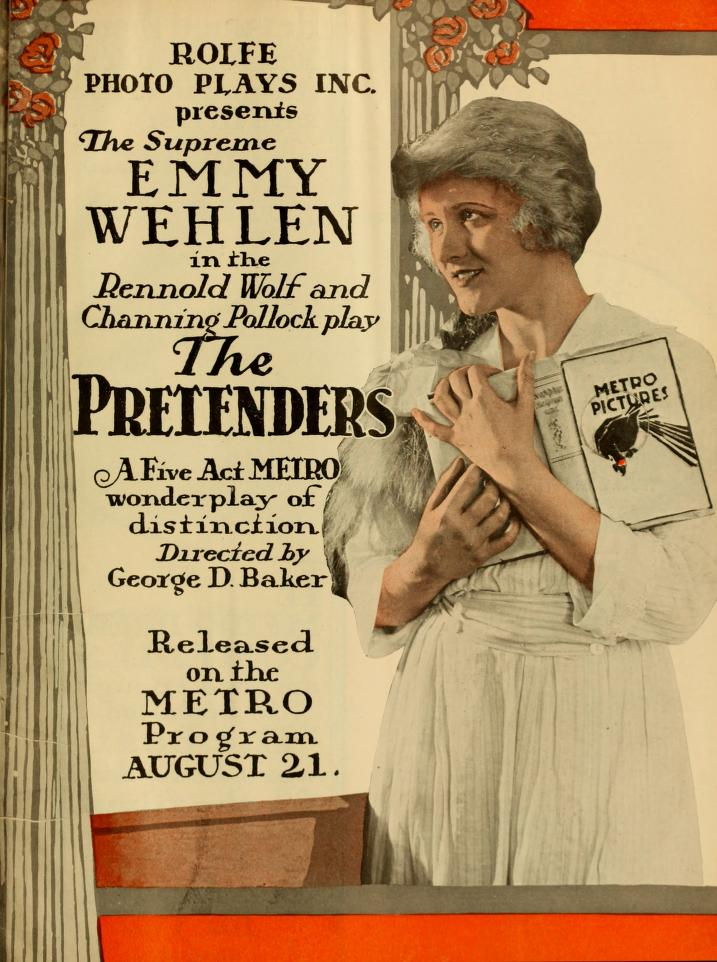
- Directed by: George D. Baker
- Written by: Channing Pollock (story); George D. Baker (scenario)
- Produced by: B. A. Rolfe
- Starring: Emmy Wehlen
- Cinematography: William Wagner
- Production company: Rolfe Photoplays
- Distributed by: Metro Pictures
- Release date: August 21, 1916
- Running time: 5 reels
- Country: United States
- Language: Silent (English intertitles)

The Pretenders is a lost 1916 American silent film. It was produced by B. A. Rolfe and distributed by Metro Pictures with a story by Channing Pollock. Stage actress Emmy Wehlen starred.

== Cast ==
- Emmy Wehlen as Helen Pettingill
- Paul Gordon as Hubert Stanwood
- Charles Eldridge as Silas T. Pettengill
- Kate Blancke as Maria Pettingill
- Edwin Holt as Inspector Burke
- William B. Davidson as Joseph Bailey (credited as William Davidson)
- Howard Truesdale as John Stafford (credited as Howard Truesdell)
- Jerome N. Wilson as Joseph Bailey (credited as Jerome Wilson)
- Ilean Hume as Rita
- Harry Neville as Dugan
- Hugh Jeffrey as Andrews
- George Stevens
