= Fanny Cogan =

American stage and film actress

- Occupation: film actress
- Years active: 1918–1920

Fanny Cogan (1866 – May 18, 1929) was a stage and film actress of the silent movie era from Philadelphia, Pennsylvania.

Cogan appeared on stage in The Bohemian Girl. She later went into movies. Her screen credits number five. She had roles in The Shell Game (1918), The Cross Bearer (1918), The Great Victory, Wilson or the Kaiser, the Fall of the Hohenzollerns (1919), The Woman of Lies (1919), and The Shadow of Rosalie Byrnes (1920).

Fanny Hay Cogan died in Lenox Hospital in New York City in 1929. She was 64 years old. Cogan was the widow of scenario writer James P. Cogan.
