= Learning to Love =

1925 film

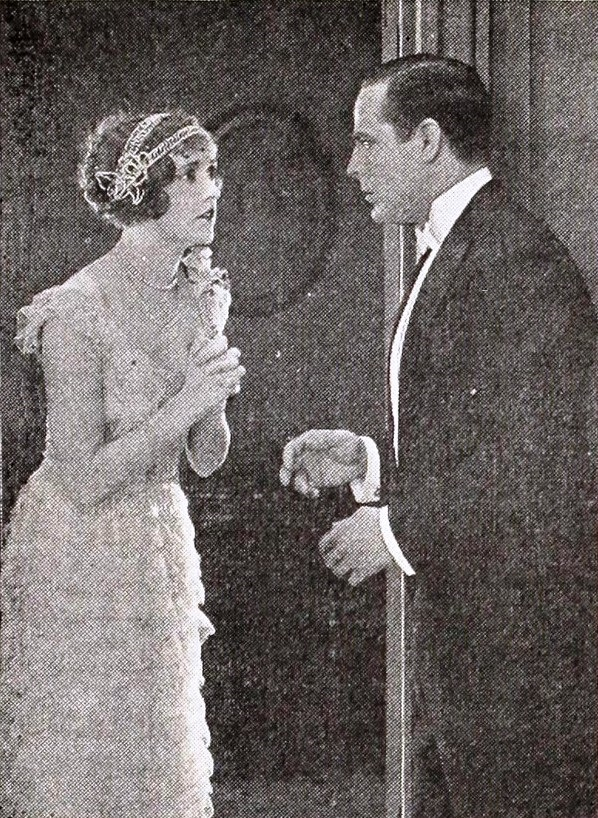
- Still with Talmadge and Moreno
- Directed by: Sidney Franklin
- Screenplay by: John Emerson; Anita Loos
- Starring: Constance Talmadge; Antonio Moreno; Emily Fitzroy; Edythe Chapman; John Harron; Ray Hallor
- Cinematography: Victor Milner
- Production company: Norma Talmadge Film Corporation
- Distributed by: First National Pictures
- Release date: January 25, 1925
- Running time: 70 minutes
- Country: United States
- Language: Silent (English intertitles)

Learning to Love is a 1925 American silent comedy film directed by Sidney Franklin and written by John Emerson and Anita Loos. The film stars Constance Talmadge, Antonio Moreno, Emily Fitzroy, Edythe Chapman, John Harron, and Ray Hallor. The film was released on January 25, 1925, by First National Pictures.

== Cast ==
- Constance Talmadge as Patricia Stanhope
- Antonio Moreno as Scott Warner
- Emily Fitzroy as Aunt Virginia
- Edythe Chapman as Aunt Penelope
- John Harron as Billy Carmichael
- Ray Hallor as Thomas Morton
- Wallace MacDonald as Professor Bonnard
- Alfred J. Goulding as John the Barber
- Byron Munson as Count Coo-Coo
- Edgar Norton as Butler
- Percy Williams as Butler

== Preservation ==
An incomplete print of Learning to Love is in the collection of the Library of Congress.
