= The Frisky Mrs. Johnson =

1920 film by Edward Dillon

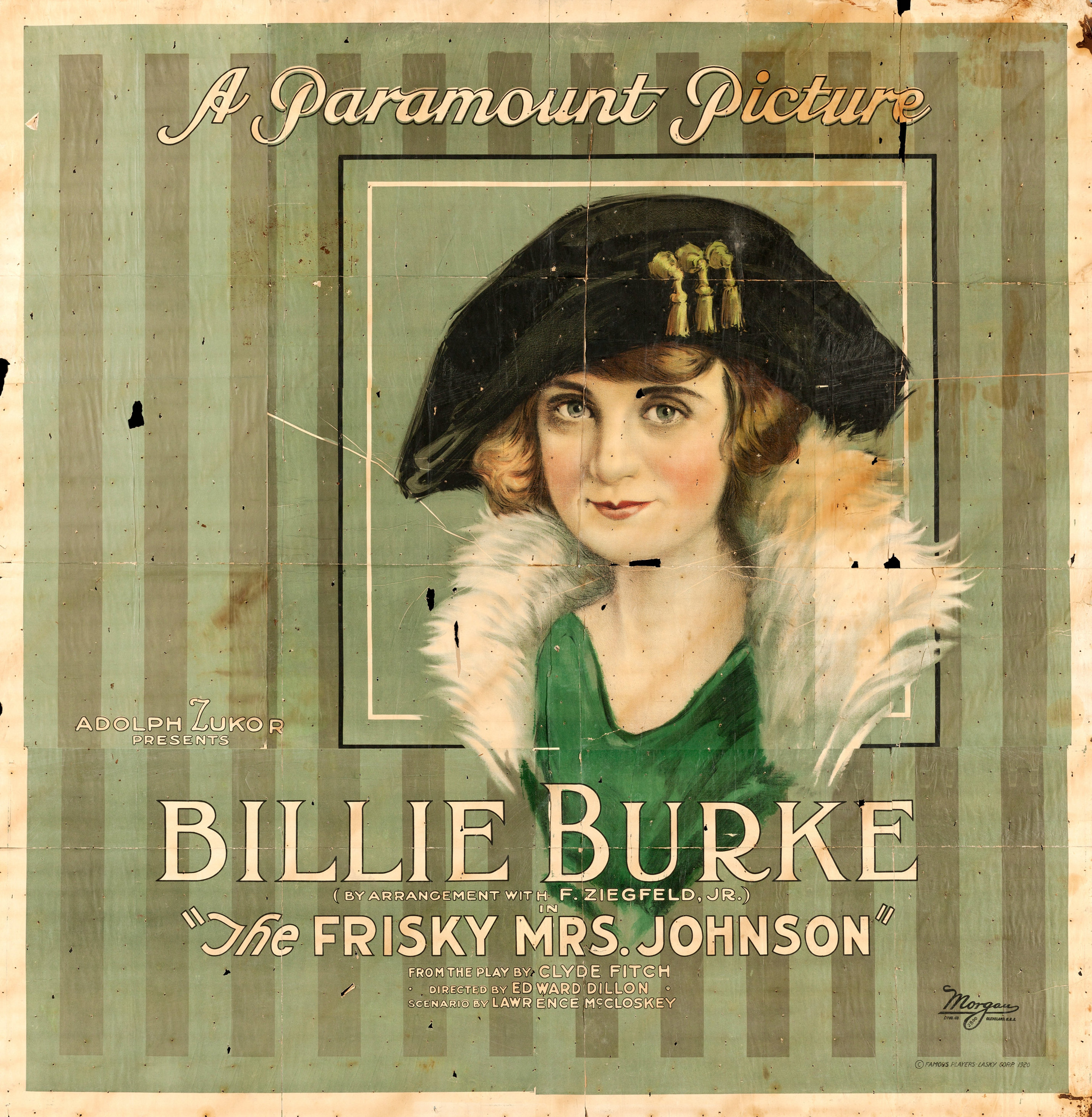
- Theatrical release poster
- Directed by: Edward Dillon
- Written by: Lawrence McClosky (scenario)
- Based on: The Frisky Mrs. Johnson by Clyde Fitch Madame Flirt by Paul Gavault and Georges Berr
- Produced by: Adolph Zukor; Jesse Lasky
- Starring: Billie Burke
- Cinematography: George Folsey
- Distributed by: Paramount Pictures
- Release date: November 21, 1920
- Running time: 5 reels (5,586 feet)
- Country: United States
- Languages: Silent film (English intertitles)

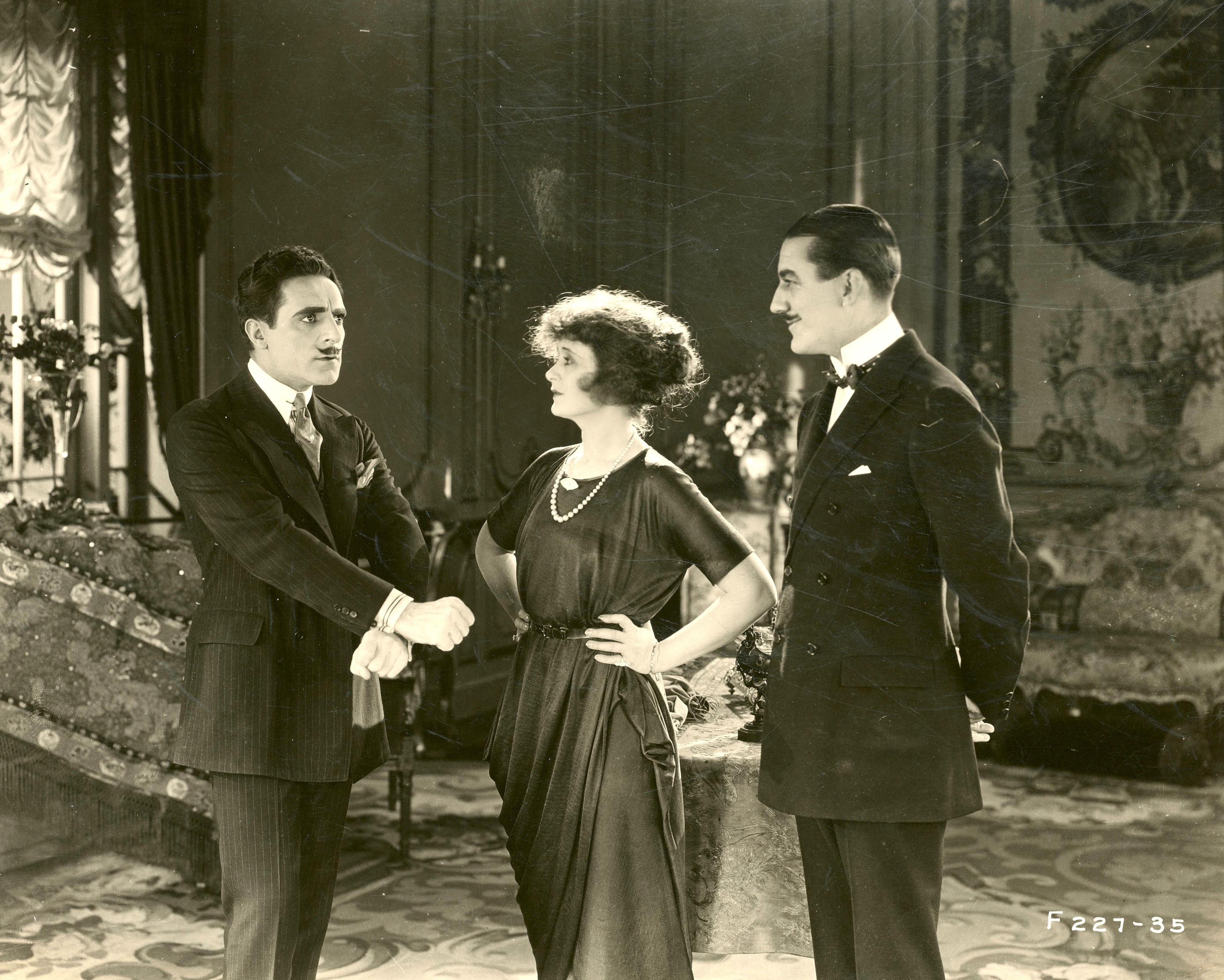
Jean De Briac, Billie Burke and Ward Crane in the film.

The Frisky Mrs. Johnson is a 1920 American silent comedy film starring Billie Burke. It was produced by Famous Players–Lasky and distributed through Paramount Pictures. It is based on a 1903 Broadway stage play by Clyde Fitch. On the stage Burke's part was played by Amelia Bingham. Burke's next to last silent film.

== Plot ==
As summarized in a film publication, Mrs. Belle Johnson is a widow and has a married sister Grace Morley who is unhappy and is having an affair with Sir Lionel Heathcote. Belle tries to keep them apart to save her sister's reputation. Frank Morley, a brother of Grace's husband and a previous love of Belle, returns and soon he and Belle are in love again and planning to elope. At the same time Grace is planning on running off with Heathcote, and a note sent to her is found by her husband Jim. Jim follows his wife Grace to Heathcote's apartment, but Belle gets there ahead of them and pretends that the note was meant for her. Franks hears of this and wants nothing more with Belle. Eventually, Grace decides that she cannot let her sister sacrifice her happiness and tells her husband the truth. Frank goes back with Belle, and Grace says that she is getting a divorce so that she can marry Heathcote.

== Cast ==
- Billie Burke as Belle Johnson
- Ward Crane as Jim Morley
- Jane Warrington as Grace Morley
- Lumsden Hare as Frank Morley
- Huntley Gordon as Sir Lionel Heathcote
- Jean De Briac as Max Dendeau
- Robert Agnew as Lal Birkenread
- Leonora von Ottinger as Mrs. Birkenread
- Emily Fitzroy as Mrs. Chardley

== Preservation ==
As none of copies were able to locate, the film is presumed lost.
