= Emmy Wehlen =

German actress

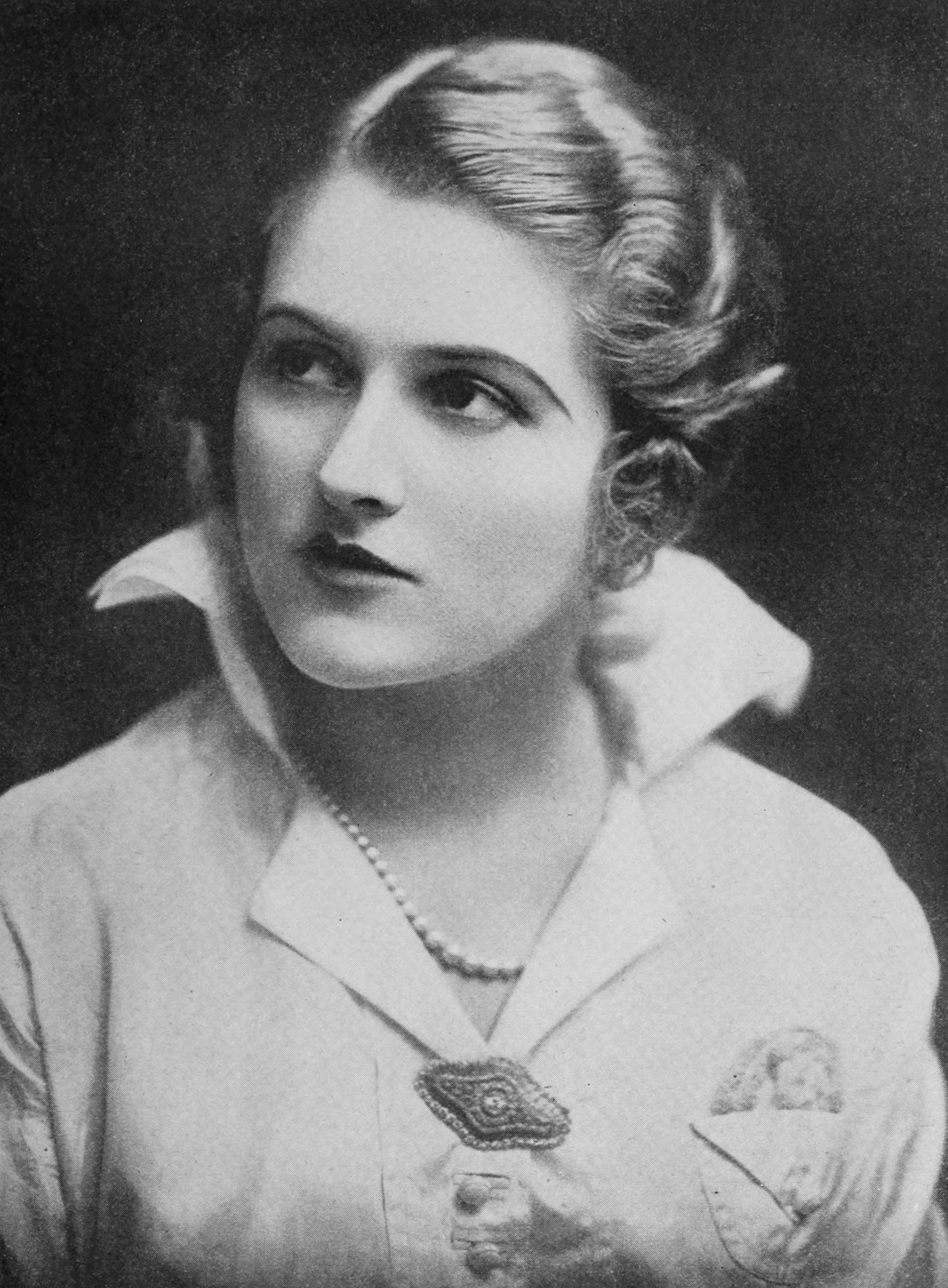
- Photoplay magazine, 1917
- Born: Emily Wehlen; 1887; Mannheim, German Empire
- Died: 1977 (aged 89–90)
- Occupation: Actress
- Years active: 1906—1920

Emily "Emmy" Wehlen (1887–1977) was a German-born Edwardian musical comedy and silent film actress who vanished from the public eye while in her early thirties.

== Biography ==
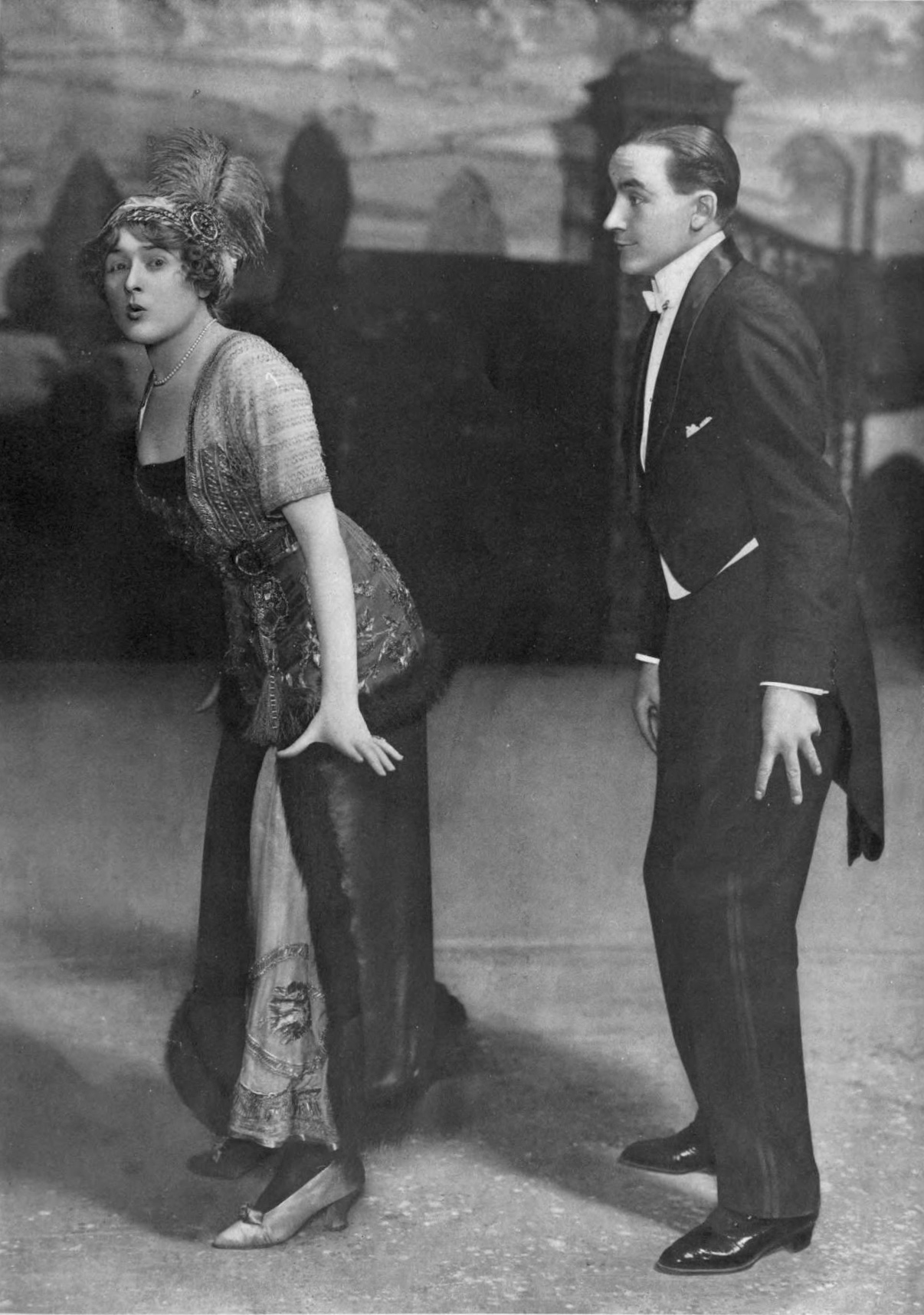
Wehlen with C. Morton Horne in Marriage a la Carte, c. 1911

Wehlen was born in Mannheim, Germany, where, as a teenager, she received her musical training at the Mannheim Conservatory. She began her career with the Thalia-Theater company performing in musical theatre productions in Stuttgart, Munich and Berlin. She was later brought to London as a possible successor to Lily Elsie. In 1909 she played the lead role, Sonia, in The Merry Widow at Daly's Theatre. and later that year, at the same venue, played Olga, in the hit musical, The Dollar Princess, which had a run of 428 performances.

Soon she was in New York playing Rosalie in the musical comedy Marriage a la Carte that opened January 2, 1911 at the Casino Theatre on Broadway (music by Ivan Caryll). In 1912 she played Mrs. Guyer in A Winsome Widow at the Loew's New York Theatre, then known as the Moulin Rouge. The next year she appeared at the Gaiety Theatre, London and then at the 44th Street Theatre in The Girl on the Film as Winifred. The Playgoer and Society Illustrated wrote in May 1913, "Miss Emmy Wehlen used a distinctly pleasant voice to advantage". Her last Broadway performance came in the 1914/15 season playing June in To-Night's the Night at the Shubert Theatre.

Not long after To-Night's the Night ended its run, Wehlen abandoned the stage for film, only to return briefly in late 1918 to perform with the traveling Little Theatre in New York to benefit the Stage Women's War Relief Organization. Wehlen first played Ruth King in the 1915 film When a Woman Loves and would go on to perform leading roles in nearly twenty movies over the next five years. During this time she was often billed as Emily Wehlen. Her last film was Lifting Shadows, released in 1920, in which she played the lead character, Vania. Only three Wehlen films are known to have survived, and none of these have been re-released in any format to the public.

A 1911 article in Everybody’s Magazine commented that Wehlen was "very pretty, very graceful, and extraordinarily clever as an actress, and she has learned how to use a naturally fine voice. Moreover, she has the indescribable charm of personality, of making audiences like her and want to have her on the stage all the time." Wehlen was described in a Hollywood directory as being five-foot three inches tall, with blonde hair and brown eyes.

== Filmography ==
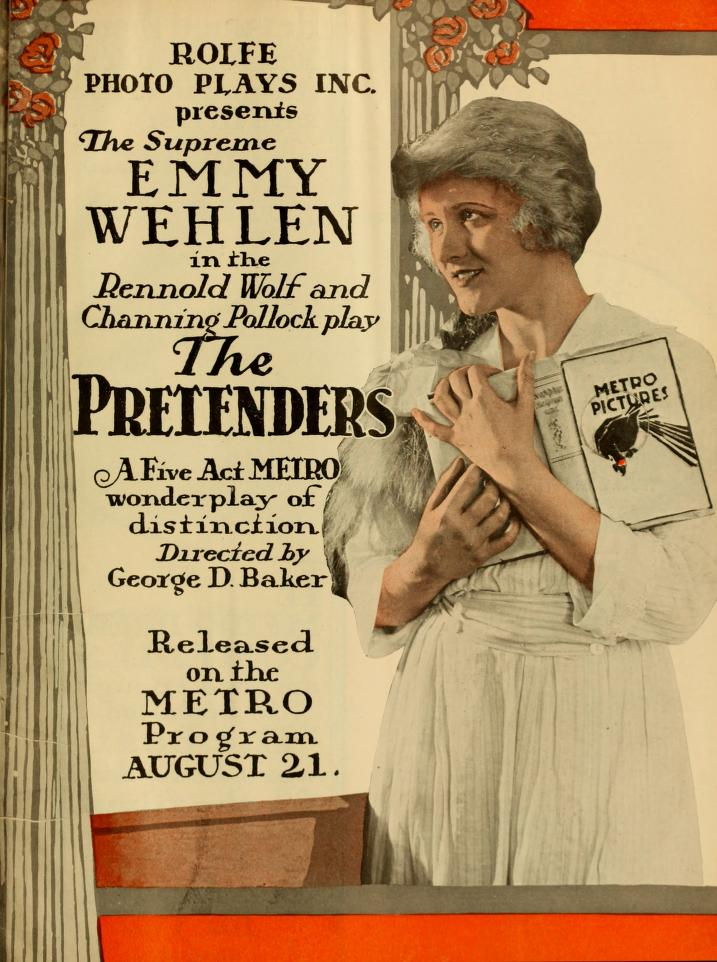
The Pretenders (1916)

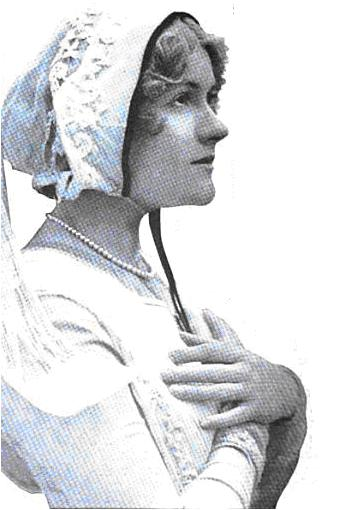
Cosmopolitan Magazine, August 1912

- When a Woman Loves (1915)
- Her Reckoning (1915)
- The Master Smiles (1916) *short film
- The Pretenders (1916)
- Vanity (1916) as Phyllis Lord
- Sowers and Reapers (1917)
- The Trail of the Shadow (1917)
- Miss Robinson Crusoe (1917)
- The Outsider (1917) (*extant; MOMA)
- The Duchess of Doubt (1917)
- The Shell Game (1918)
- The House of Gold (1918)
- His Bonded Wife (1918)
- Sylvia on a Spree (1918)
- The Amateur Adventuress (1919)
- Fools and Their Money (1919)
- A Favor To A Friend (1919)
- The Belle of the Season (1919)
- Lifting Shadows (1920) (*extant; BFI National Film archives (UK))
