= Fools and Their Money =

1919 film by Herbert Blaché

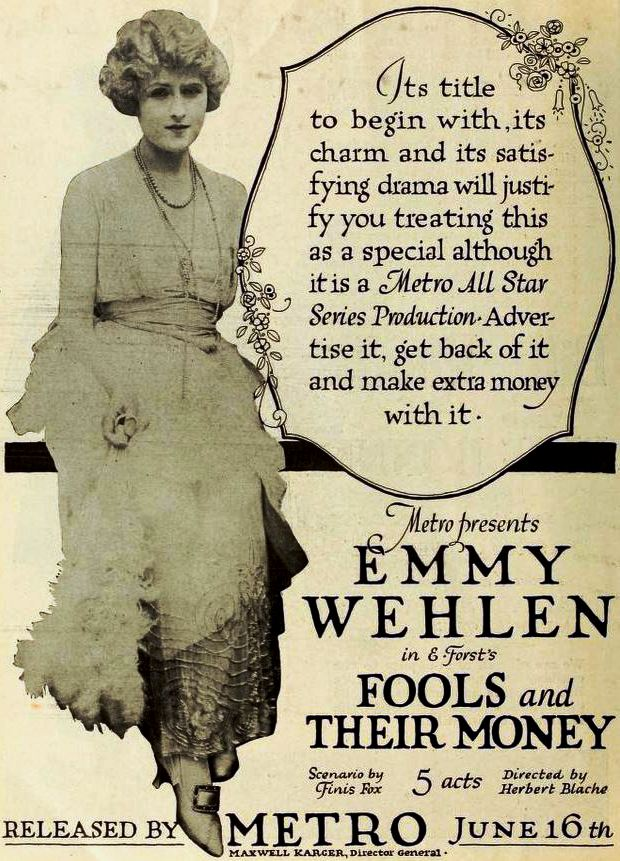
- press add
- Directed by: Herbert Blaché
- Written by: Finis Fox
- Based on: The Family Tree by Emil Forst
- Produced by: Maxwell Karger
- Starring: Emmy Wehlen
- Cinematography: Arthur Martinelli
- Distributed by: Metro Pictures
- Release date: June 16, 1919
- Running time: 5 reels
- Country: USA
- Language: Silent..English titles

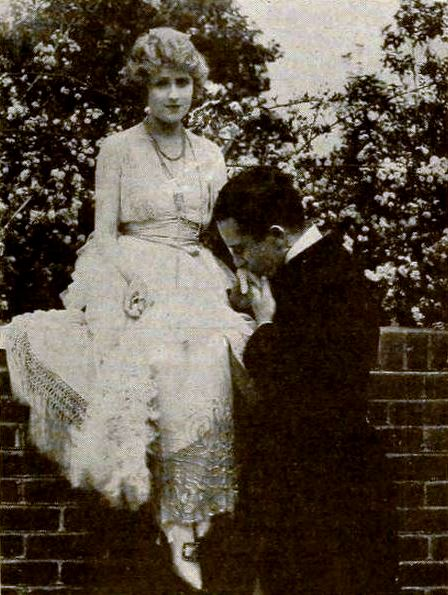
a scene in the film.

Fools and Their Money is a lost 1919 silent film comedy directed by Herbert Blaché and starring Emmy Wehlen. Maxwell Karger produced and it was released through Metro Pictures.

== Cast ==
- Emmy Wehlen as Louise Allenby
- Jack Mulhall as Richard Tompkins
- Emmett King as William A. Allenby
- Mollie McConnell as Gwyndolynne Allenby
- Betty K. Peterson as Jane Tompkins
- William V. Mong as Martin Tompkins
- Gerard Grassby as Mrs. Nora Tompkins (*aka George Alexander)
- John Steppling as Chef
- Bertram Grassby as Cholly Van Dusen
- Gordon Marr as Percy Winslow
- Charles Hill Mailes
