= The Shell Game (film) =

1918 silent film directed by George D. Baker

- Directed by: George D. Baker
- Written by: George D. Baker
- Based on: the short story, "Good Will and Almond Shells" by Kenneth L. Roberts
- Produced by: Maxwell Karger
- Starring: Emmy Wehlen; Henry Kolker; Joseph Kilgour
- Cinematography: Eugene Gaudio
- Production company: Metro Pictures
- Release date: March 4, 1918 (US)
- Running time: 5 reels
- Country: United States
- Language: English

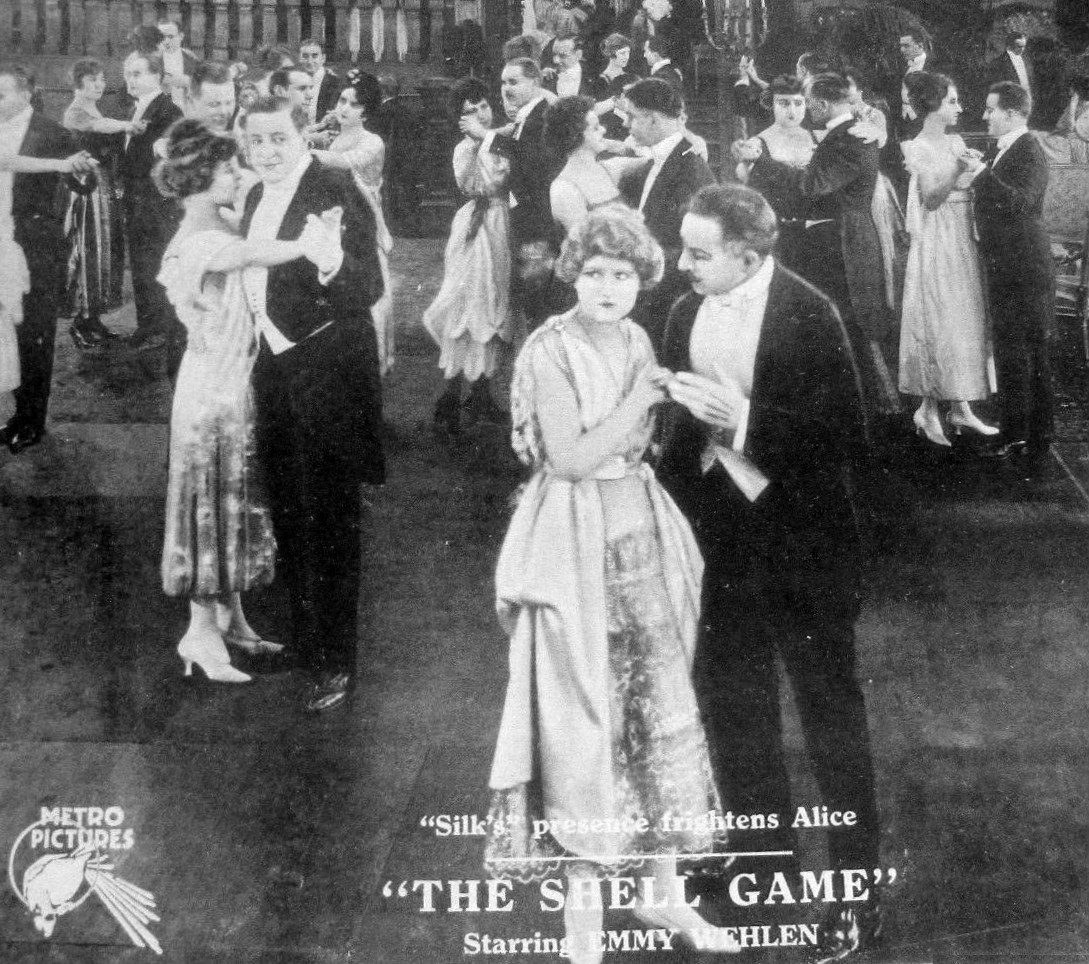
Lobby card for the American drama film The Shell Game (1918).

The Shell Game, is a 1918 American silent drama film, directed by George D. Baker. It stars Emmy Wehlen, Henry Kolker, and Joseph Kilgour, and was released on March 4, 1918.

== Cast ==
- Emmy Wehlen as Alice Sheldon/Zelda Gray
- Henry Kolker as Lawrence Gray
- Joseph Kilgour as Silk Wilkins
- Fanny Cogan as Mrs. Wentworth
- Ricca Allen as Landlady
- Hugh Jeffrey as Headwaiter
- Richard Thornton as Hotel manager
- Clarence Heritage as The maestro
- Donald MacBride as Vocal teacher
