= Howard Truesdale =

American actor

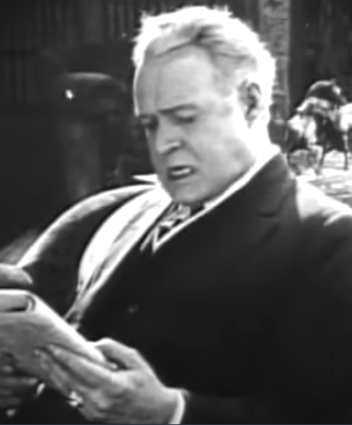
- Truesdale in Bolshevism on Trial, 1919
- Born: January 3, 1861; Conneautville, Pennsylvania
- Died: December 8, 1941 (aged 80); Los Angeles, California
- Occupation: Actor

Howard Truesdale (January 3, 1861 – December 8, 1941; also credited as Truesdell, Truedell, and Truesdall) was an American stage actor and a film actor in both the silent and sound eras. He appeared in the films A Corner in Cotton, The Purple Lady, The Pretenders, Bolshevism on Trial, What Women Want, French Heels, No Trespassing, Out of Luck, Ashes of Vengeance, Ride for Your Life, Why Men Leave Home, The Night Message, The Foolish Virgin, The Ridin' Kid from Powder River, Go West, The Combat, Fighting with Buffalo Bill, The Jazz Girl, The Stolen Ranch, The Denver Dude, Singed, The Tigress, Burning Daylight, A Trick of Hearts, Three-Ring Marriage, The Lawless Legion and The Long Long Trail, among others.

== Selected filmography ==
- The Embarrassment of Riches (1918)
- Youthful Folly (1920)
- The Whisper Market (1920)
- Painted Faces (1929)
