= The Tigress (1927 film) =

1927 film

- Directed by: George B. Seitz
- Written by: Harold Shumate
- Produced by: Harry Cohn
- Starring: Jack Holt
- Cinematography: Joseph Walker
- Edited by: Ben Pivar
- Distributed by: Columbia Pictures
- Release date: October 21, 1927
- Running time: 54 minutes
- Country: United States
- Language: Silent

The Tigress is a 1927 American silent drama film directed by George B. Seitz.

== Cast ==
- Jack Holt as Winston Graham, Earl of Eddington
- Dorothy Revier as Mona, 'The Tigress'
- Frank Leigh as Pietro the Bold
- Philippe De Lacy as Pippa
- Howard Truesdale as Tser (as Howard Truesdell)
- Frank Nelson as Wibble

== Preservation and status ==
A complete copy of the film is held at the Museum of Modern Art.
