= Ward Crane =

American actor

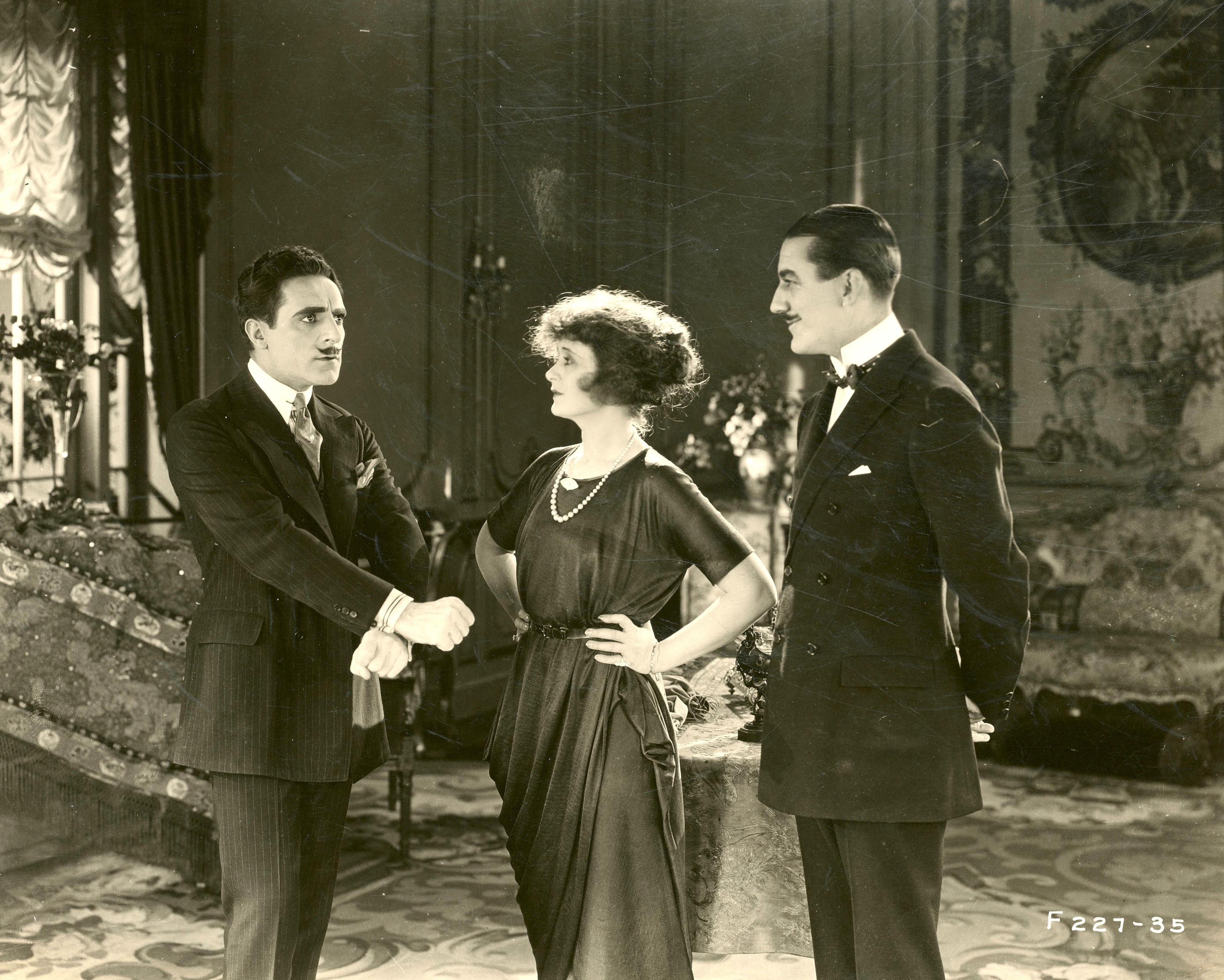
- Jean De Briac, Billie Burke, and Ward Crane in The Frisky Mrs. Johnson (1920)
- Born: May 18, 1890; Albany, New York, U.S.
- Died: July 21, 1928 (aged 38); Saranac Lake, New York, U.S.
- Resting place: St. Agnes Cemetery
- Occupation: Actor
- Years active: 1913–1928

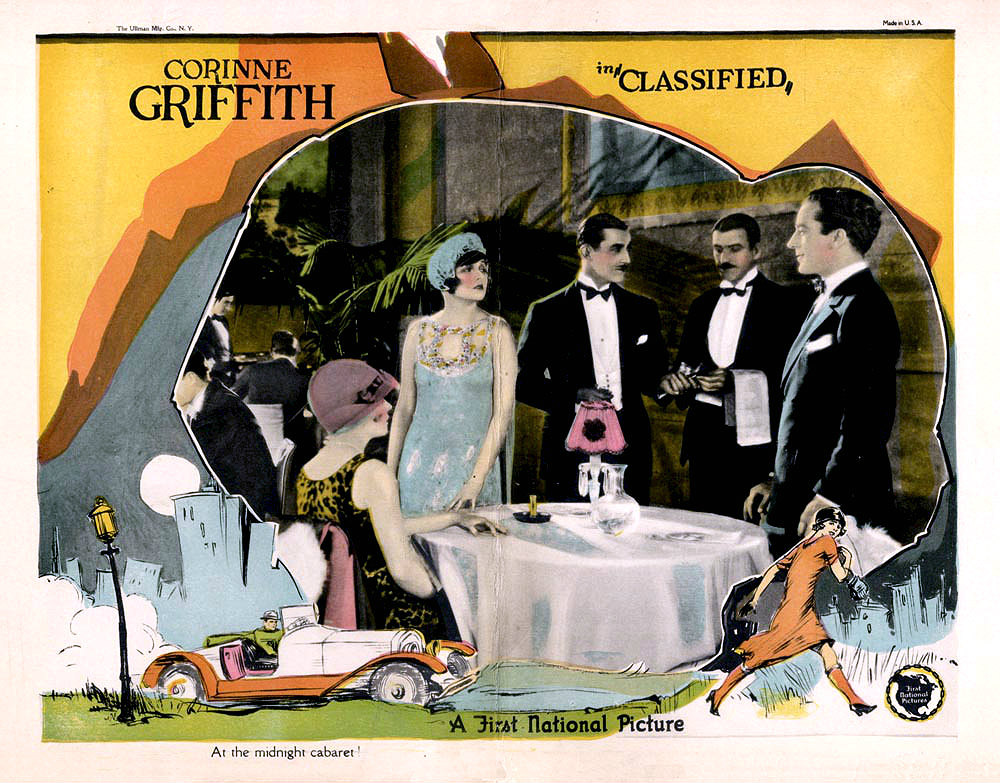
Crane third from right in Classified 1925

Ward Crane (May 18, 1890 – July 21, 1928) was an American silent film actor popular in comedies and dramas. Out of dozens of films, he is remembered as the handsome heavy to Buster Keaton's hero in Sherlock Jr. (1924). Crane died aged 38 in Saranac Lake, New York, from pneumonia.

Crane was the son of John J. Crane. He was born and educated in Albany, New York. He served in the Navy during World War I. He was buried in St. Agnes Cemetery in Albany.

== Selected filmography ==
- The Dark Star (1919)
- The Scoffer (1920)
- In the Heart of a Fool (1920)
- Harriet and the Piper (1920)
- The Frisky Mrs. Johnson (1920)
- The Luck of the Irish (1920)
- Something Different (1920)
- Heedless Moths (1921)
- French Heels (1922)
- No Trespassing (1922)
- Broadway Rose (1922)
- Destiny's Isle (1922)
- The Famous Mrs. Fair (1923)
- Within the Law (1923)
- Enemies of Children (1923)
- Pleasure Mad (1923)
- The Meanest Man in the World (1923)
- Gambling Wives (1924)
- Sherlock Jr. (1924) as The Local Sheik/The Villain
- Bread (1924)
- Empty Hands (1924)
- The Phantom of the Opera (1925)
- How Baxter Butted In (1925)
- The Million Dollar Handicap (1925)
- Peacock Feathers (1925)
- Classified (1925)
- Borrowed Finery (1925)
- The Crimson Runner (1925)
- The Blind Goddess (1926)
- The Flaming Frontier (1926)
- Under Western Skies (1926)
- That Model from Paris (1926)
- Upstage (1926)
- The Lady in Ermine (1927) with Corinne Griffith and Francis X. Bushman
- The Beauty Shoppers (1927)
- The American (1927) (not released)
- The Rush Hour (1928)
- Honeymoon Flats (1928)
