= Emily Fitzroy =

British actress (1860–1954)

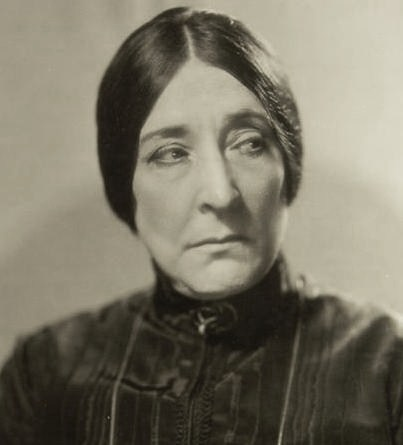
- Fitzroy in Show Boat (1929)
- Born: 24 May 1860
- Died: 3 March 1954 (aged 93)
- Occupation: Actress
- Years active: 1913–1944

Emily Fitzroy (24 May 1860 – 3 March 1954) was an English theatre and film actress who eventually became an American citizen. She was at one time a leading lady in London for Sir Charles Wyndham.

She made her film debut in 1915. Her debut in sound films came in Show Boat (1929). She retired in 1944. Her last film was The White Cliffs of Dover (1944).

Her Broadway credits include What the Public Wants (1922), I.O.U. (1918), Rich Man, Poor Man (1916), Lady Patricia (1912), and Just to Get Married (1912).

== Death ==
Fitzroy died of stroke on March 3, 1954, aged 93 years.

== Selected filmography ==
- Sins of Men (1916) - Minor Role
- East Lynne (1916) - Cornelia
- The Return of Eve (1916) - Mrs. Tupper-Bellamy
- A Broadway Saint (1919) - Martha Galt
- The Climbers (1919) - Mrs. Hunter
- Deadline at Eleven (1920) - Mrs. Martha Stevens
- The Man Who Lost Himself (1920) - Richester's Aunt
- Way Down East (1920) - Maria Poole - Landlady
- The Frisky Mrs. Johnson (1920) - Mrs. Chardley
- The New York Idea (1920) - Grace Phillimore
- Out of the Chorus (1921) - Mrs. Van Beekman
- Straight Is the Way (1921) - Mrs. Crabtree
- Wife Against Wife (1921) - Mrs. Dole
- Jane Eyre (1921) - Grace Poole (a servant)
- The Splendid Lie (1922) - Mrs. Wolcott Delafield
- Find the Woman (1922) - Mrs. Napoli
- Fascination (1922) - The Marquesa de Lisa (her aunt)
- No Trespassing (1922) - Mrs. James Colton
- Fury (1923) - Matilda Brent
- Driven (1923) - Mrs. Tolliver
- The Purple Highway (1923) - Mrs. Carney
- Strangers of the Night (1923) - Mrs. Pengard
- Jealous Husbands (1923) - Amaryllis
- The Whispered Name (1924) - Amanda Stone
- Secrets (1924) - Mrs. Marlowe
- A Girl of the Limberlost (1924) - Kate Comstock
- Untamed Youth (1924) - Emily Ardis
- The Man Who Came Back (1924) - Aunt Isabel
- The Red Lily (1924) - Mama Bouchard
- His Hour (1924) - Princess Ardacheff
- Her Night of Romance (1924) - Nurse (scenes deleted)
- Love's Wilderness (1924) - Matilda Heath
- The Hooded Falcon (1924)
- The Spaniard (1925) - Maria
- The Golden Bed (1925) - Minor Role (uncredited)
- Learning to Love (1925) - Aunt Virginia
- The Lady (1925) - Madame Blanche
- Outwitted (1925) - Meg
- The Denial (1925) - Rena - Mother in Flashback
- Zander the Great (1925) - The Matron
- Are Parents People? (1925) - Margaret
- Never the Twain Shall Meet (1925) - Mrs. Pippy
- Thunder Mountain (1925) - Ma MacBirney
- The Winding Stair (1925) - Madame Muller
- Bobbed Hair (1925) - Aunt Celimena Moore
- Lazybones (1925) - Mrs. Fanning
- The Red Kimono (1925) - The Housekeeper
- What Happened to Jones (1926) - Mrs. Goodly
- The Bat (1926) - Miss Cornelia Van Gorder
- High Steppers (1926) - Mrs. Iffield
- Hard Boiled (1926) - Abigail Gregg
- No Babies Wanted (1926) - Landlady, 'Old Ironsides'
- Don Juan (1926) - The Dowager (uncredited)
- Marriage License? (1926) - Lady Heriot
- Bardelys the Magnificent (1926) - Vicomtesse de Lavedan
- The Cheerful Fraud (1926) - Mrs. Bytheway
- One Increasing Purpose (1927) - Mrs. Andiron
- The Sea Tiger (1927) - Mrs. Enos
- Orchids and Ermine (1927) - Mrs. Blom
- Married Alive (1927) - Mrs. Maggs Duxbury
- Mockery (1927) - Mrs. Gaidaroff
- Foreign Devils (1927) - Mrs. Conger
- Love Me and the World Is Mine (1927) - The Porter's Wife
- Once and Forever (1927) - Katherine
- Love (1927) - Grand Duchess
- Gentlemen Prefer Blondes (1928) - Lady Beekman
- The Trail of '98 (1928) - Mrs. Bulkey
- The Case of Lena Smith (1929) - Frau Hofrat
- Show Boat (1929) - Parthenia Ann Hawks
- The Bridge of San Luis Rey (1929) - Marquesa
- The Man from Blankley's (1930) - Mrs. Tidmarsh
- Dumbbells in Ermine (1930) - Gossiper (uncredited)
- The Flirting Widow (1930) - Aunt Ida
- Song o' My Heart (1930) - Aunt Elizabeth
- She's My Weakness (1930) - Mrs. Oberlander
- New Moon (1930) - Countess Anastasia Strogoff
- Unfaithful (1931) - Auntie Janie
- It's a Wise Child (1931) - Jane Appleby
- Misbehaving Ladies (1931) - Meta Oliver
- Detective Lloyd (1932, Serial) - The Manor Ghost
- Aren't We All? (1932) - Angela
- Lucky Ladies (1932) - Cleo Honeycutt
- High Society (1932) - Mrs. Strangeways
- Timbuctoo (1933) - Aunt Augusta
- Don Quixote (1933) - Sancho Panza's wife
- Her Imaginary Lover (1933) - Aunt Lydia Raleigh
- Dick Turpin (1934) - Minor Role
- The Man with Two Faces (1934) - Hattie
- Two Heads on a Pillow (1934) - Mrs. Van Suydam
- The Captain Hates the Sea (1934) - Mrs. Victoria Griswold
- China Seas (1935) - Mrs. Higgins
- She Couldn't Take It (1935) - Party Guest (uncredited)
- Border Flight (1936) - Old Maid (uncredited)
- The Bold Caballero (1936) - Lady Isabella's Chaperone
- Nothing Sacred (1937) - Guest at Banquet
- The Frontiersmen (1938) - School Teacher aka Snooksie
- Vigil in the Night (1940) - Sister Gilson
- The Flame of New Orleans (1941) - Cousin
- Two-Faced Woman (1941) - Rhumba Dancer
- Forever and a Day (1943) - Ms. Fulcher
- The White Cliffs of Dover (1944) - Spinster in Boardinghouse
