= French Heels =

1922 silent film romantic comedy

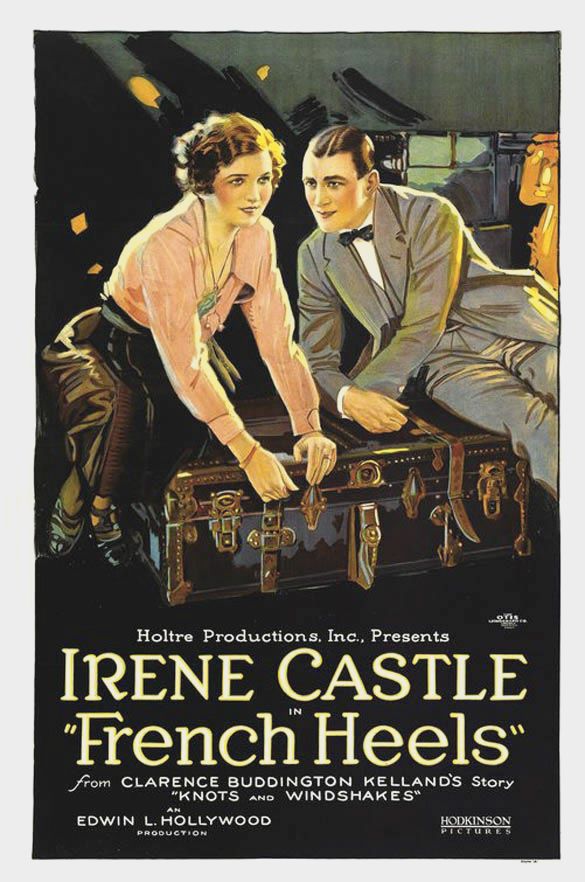
- Lobby poster
- Directed by: Edwin L. Hollywood
- Written by: Eve Unsell
- Based on: "Knots and Windshakes" by Clarence Budington Kelland
- Produced by: Holtre Productions
- Starring: Irene Castle; Ward Crane
- Cinematography: Robert A. Stuart; William McCoy
- Distributed by: W. W. Hodkinson Corporation
- Release date: January 29, 1922
- Running time: 7 reels
- Country: United States
- Language: Silent (English intertitles)

French Heels is a lost 1922 American silent romantic comedy film directed by Edwin L. Hollywood and starring Irene Castle. Based on short story "Knots and Windshakes" by Clarence Budington Kelland which appeared in Everybody's Magazine, it was distributed by W. W. Hodkinson.

== Plot ==
As described in a film magazine, Lieutenant John Tabor (Crane) returns from World War I and calls on Palma May (Castle), the sister of his buddy who died just before the signing of the Armistice. He finds that, with the death of her brother, she is now alone in the world and offers to help her. Palma is grateful but declines his offer and seeks work in New York City as a dancer. After many attempts she gets a position in a cabaret chorus and quickly rises to prominence. She meets John again and they become fast friends. Jarvis Tabor, John's father, a wealthy lumberman, is opposed to his son's marriage to a dancer even though he has never met Palma. Coming back home after a quiet wedding to the father's house, the couple find a letter ordering John to come at once to the lumber camp to assist in quelling some labor troubles. His dancing butterfly wife agrees to accompany him. At the lumber camp the two live in a shack under trying conditions. Palma is entirely out of place in the rough lumber camp but valiantly struggles to make good for her husband's sake. She is tempted to return to her old life by her former manager and is on the verge of leaving when she discovers that John is being attacked by a gang of lumberjacks. Unmindful of the danger, she plunges into the midst of the fight to save him. She is reinforced by Jarvis and some other men and together they beat back the rebellious workmen. Meeting his son's bride under such unusual conditions, the prior prejudice of the father is readily overcome when he witnesses her finer qualities.

== Cast ==
- Irene Castle as Palma May
- Ward Crane as Lieutenant John Tabor
- Charles K. Gerrard as Keith Merwyn
- Howard Truesdale as Jarvis Tabor
- Tom Murray as Camp Foreman
