= Marriage a la Carte =

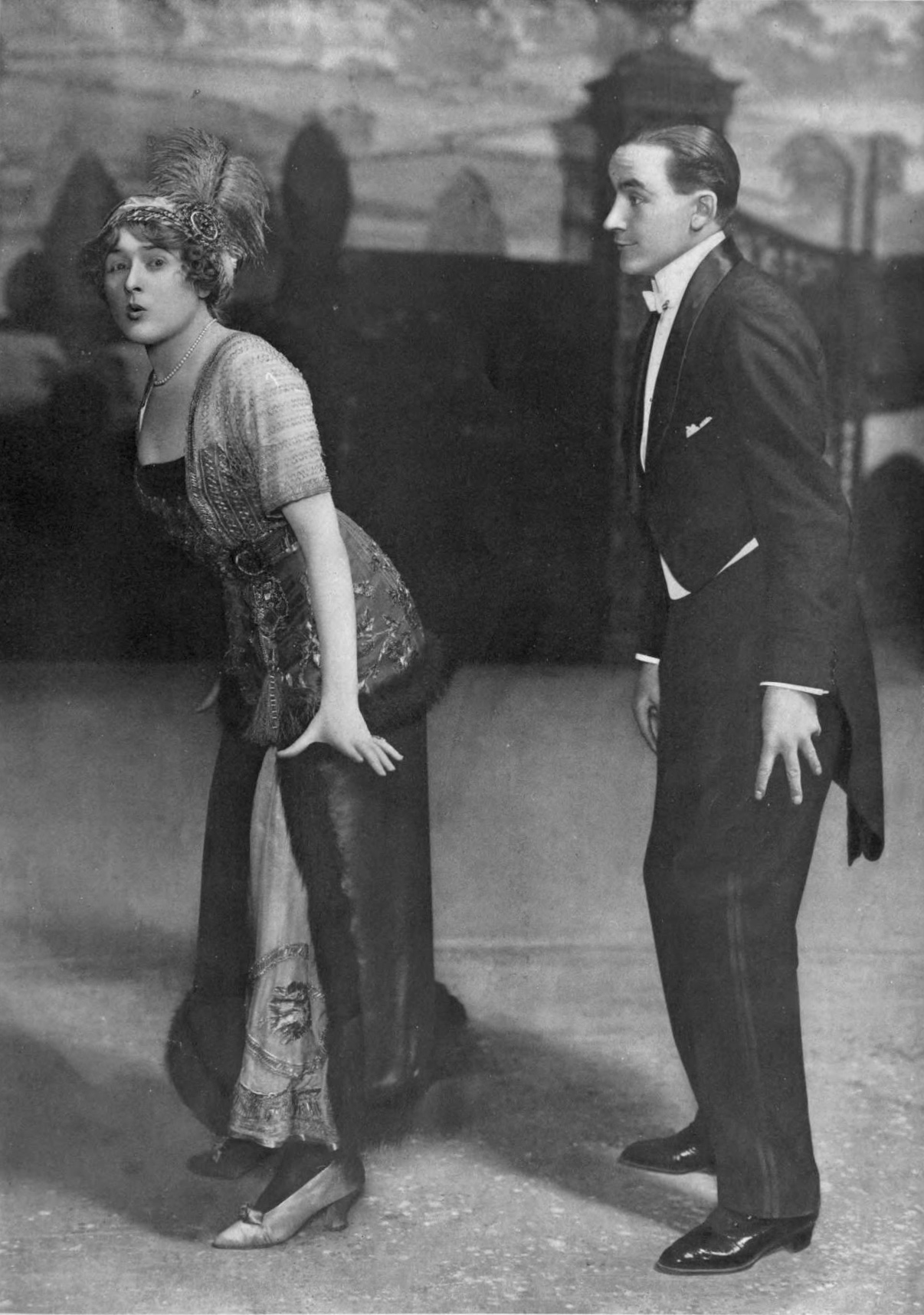
Emmy Wehlen with C. Morton Horne in Marriage a la Carte.

Marriage a la Carte is a three-act Broadway musical comedy composed and written by C. M. S. McLellan and scored by Ivan Caryll. The play was staged by Austen Hurgon with musical direction provided by J. Sebastian Hiller and Carl H. Engel. Marriage a la Carte opened on January 2, 1911 at the Casino Theatre and had a run of 64 performances.

== Synopsis ==
The play starred newcomer Emmy Wehlen and was set in England. The plot revolves around Mrs. Ponsonby de Coutts Wragge, recently engaged to Lord Mirables, and her former husbands (Ponsonby de Coutts Wragge and Napoleon Pettingill) who reappear in her life after a long absence.

== Reviews ==
The New York Times, January 3, 1911:

Marriage a la Carte has charm, distinction, humor, pretty music, pretty girls and clever comedians. What more could one want from a musical comedy? And that is what Marriage a la Carte is, a real musical comedy.

Theatre Magazine, March, 1911:

“The title of the new musical comedy, "Marriage a la Carte," by C. M. S. McClellan, has in itself no meaning that we can discover, and there is nothing in the play itself to elucidate its meaning. The title is as silly and dull as the action which seeks in vain to unfold itself on the stage." The critic went on to comment on Wehlen's New York debut, ”A new face and a new force comes to us for the first time in the person of Miss Emmy Wehlen, trained in Germany mainly on the Munich stage, and for a year or so past active on the London stage. She is a blonde, blue-eyed person, with considerable grace and intelligence, who sings and dances well, and has charms that are distinctly individual and consequently new to us. Her best song is "Silly Cock-a-Doodle-Doo," which she dances with Dick (Mr. C. Morton Horne)."

== Songs ==
- Thrifty Little Marel
- Of All Her Sex a Paragon
- For I'm Just I
- Smile, Smile, Smile
- Silly Cock-a-Doodle-Doo
- Captain Dinklepop
- Such a Bore
- Oh, Rosalie
- It's Not the Same at All
- Pass it Along to the Frog
- Marriage a la Carte (Finale)

== Cast ==
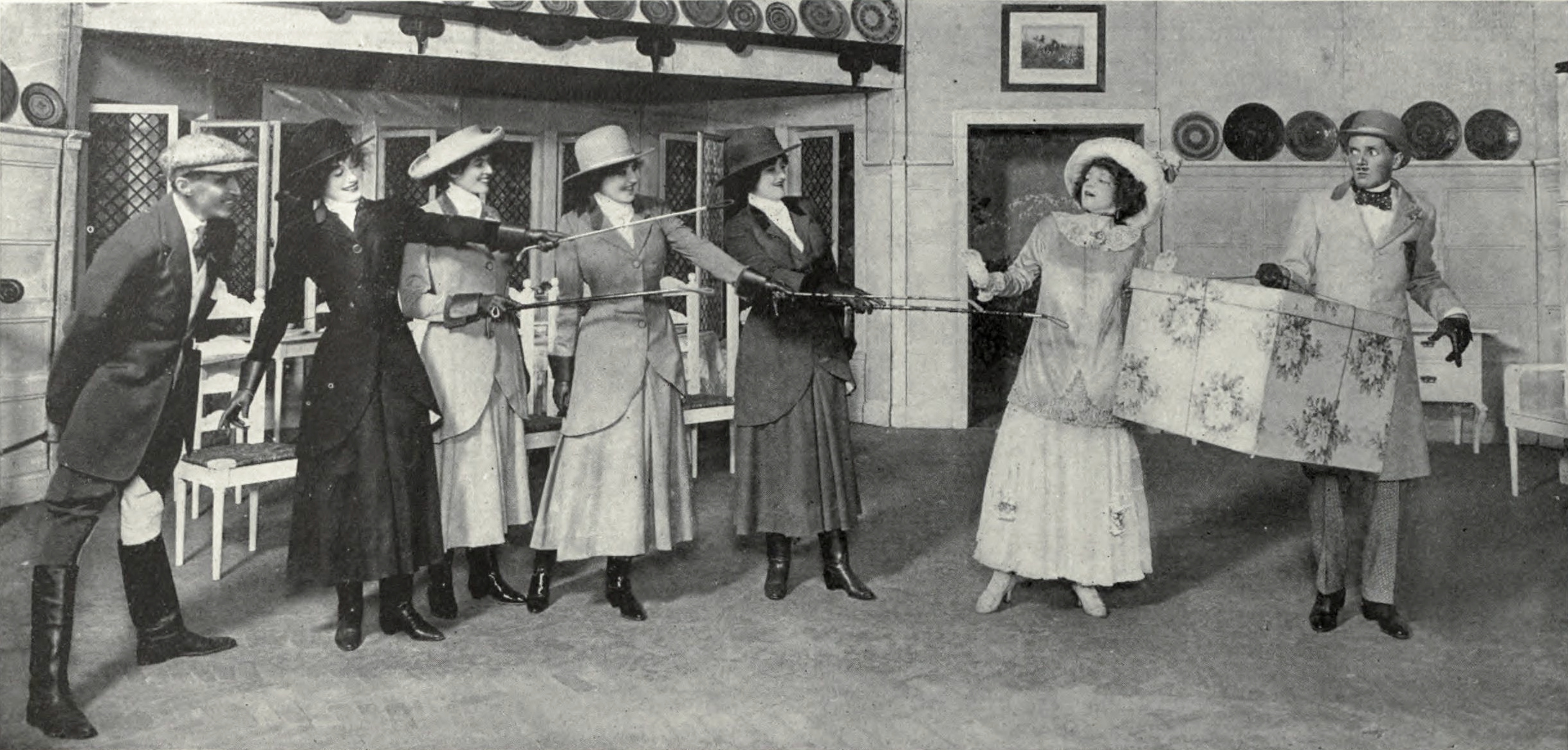
A scene from Marriage a la Carte

- Marie Ashton - Euryanthe Bowers
- Ida Barnard - Primrose Farmilow
- Esther Bissett - Sheila Wragge
- Norman A. Blume - Jimmy Wragge
- Charles Brown - Cuthbert Coddington
- Cyril Chadwick - Ponsonby de Coutts Wragge
- Harry Conor - Napoleon Pettingill
- Maria Davis - Mrs. Ponsonby de Coutts Wragge
- Joe Doner - Thomas Bolingbroke Mullens
- A. W. Fleming - Mr. Pink
- Jack Hagner - Young Micklethorpe
- Rosina Henley - Molly
- Jack F. Henry - Eustace Haws
- C. Morton Horne - Hon. Richard Mirables
- Harry Kelly - Footman
- Diane Otse - Elsie Tattleby
- Frances Reeve - Iseult Punchum
- Elsa Ryan - Daisy Dimsy
- Quentin Todd - Aubrey Hipps
- J. R. Torrens - Gerald Gifford
- Harold Vizard - Lord Mirables
- Emmy Wehlen - Rosalie
