= The Jazz Girl =

1926 film

- Directed by: Howard M. Mitchell
- Written by: Bruce Truman
- Produced by: Louis T. Rogers
- Starring: Gaston Glass; Edith Roberts; Howard Truesdale
- Cinematography: Ernest Miller
- Production company: Motion Picture Guild
- Distributed by: Motion Picture Guild; Butcher's Film Service (UK)
- Release date: December 15, 1926
- Country: United States
- Languages: Silent; English intertitles

The Jazz Girl is a 1926 American silent drama film directed by Howard M. Mitchell and starring Gaston Glass, Edith Roberts and Howard Truesdale. The film is presumed lost.

== Cast ==
- Gaston Glass as Rodneey Blake
- Edith Roberts as Janet Marsh
- Howard Truesdale as John Marsh
- Murdock MacQuarrie as Henry Wade
- Coit Albertson as Frank Arnold
- Ernie Adams as Detective
- Sabel Johnson as Big Bertha
- Dick Sutherland as The Chef
- Lea Delworth as Sadie Soakum

== Bibliography ==
- Munden, Kenneth White. The American Film Institute Catalog of Motion Pictures Produced in the United States, Part 1. University of California Press, 1997.
