= American entry into World War I =

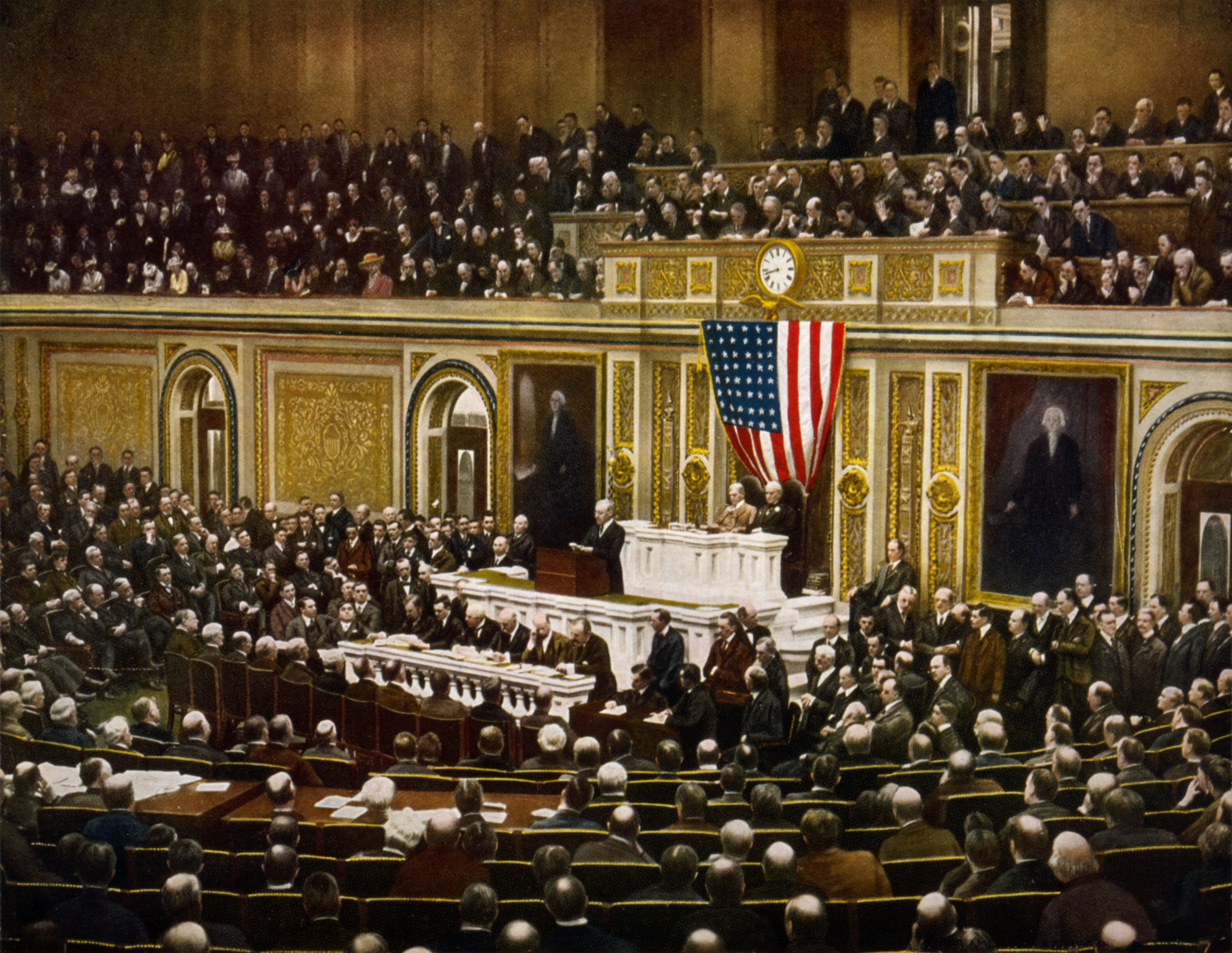
U.S. president Woodrow Wilson asking Congress to declare war on Germany on April 2, 1917

The United States entered World War I on April 6, 1917, more than two and a half years after the war began in Austria-Hungary. Apart from an Anglophile element urging early support for the British and an anti-tsarist element sympathizing with Germany's war against Russia, American public opinion had generally reflected a desire to stay out of the war. Over time, especially after reports of German atrocities in Belgium in 1914 and after the sinking of the RMS Lusitania in a torpedo attack by a submarine of the Imperial German Navy off the southern coast of Ireland in May 1915, Americans increasingly came to see Imperial Germany as the aggressor in Europe.

When the country was at peace, American banks made huge loans to the Entente powers (Allies), which were used mainly to buy munitions, raw materials, and food from across the Atlantic in North America from the United States and Canada. Although president Woodrow Wilson made minimal preparations for a land war before 1917, he did authorize a shipbuilding program for the United States Navy. Wilson was narrowly re-elected in 1916 on an anti-war platform.

By 1917, with Belgium and northern France occupied by German troops, the Russian Empire experiencing turmoil and upheaval in the February Revolution overthrowing the tsar on the Eastern Front, and with the remaining Entente nations low on credit, manpower and morale, the German Empire appeared to have the upper hand in Europe. However, a British economic embargo and naval blockade were causing severe shortages of fuel and food in Germany. Berlin then decided to resume unrestricted submarine warfare. The aim was to break the trans-Atlantic supply chain to Britain from other nations to the West, although the German high command realized that sinking American-flagged ships would almost certainly bring the United States into the war.

Imperial Germany also made a secret offer to help Mexico regain territories of the Mexican Cession of 1849, lost seven decades before in the Mexican–American War of 1846–1848, (now incorporated in the Southwestern United States) in an encoded diplomatic secret telegram known as the Zimmermann Telegram intercepted by British intelligence. Publication in the media of that communique outraged Americans just as German submarines started sinking American merchant ships in the North Atlantic in their U-boat campaign. President Wilson then asked Congress for "a war to end all wars" that would "make the world safe for democracy", and Congress voted to declare war on Germany on April 6, 1917. US troops began to arrive in Europe later that year, and served in major combat operations on the Western Front under the command of general John J. Pershing, particularly during the final Hundred Days Offensive.

== Main issues ==
=== Naval blockade ===
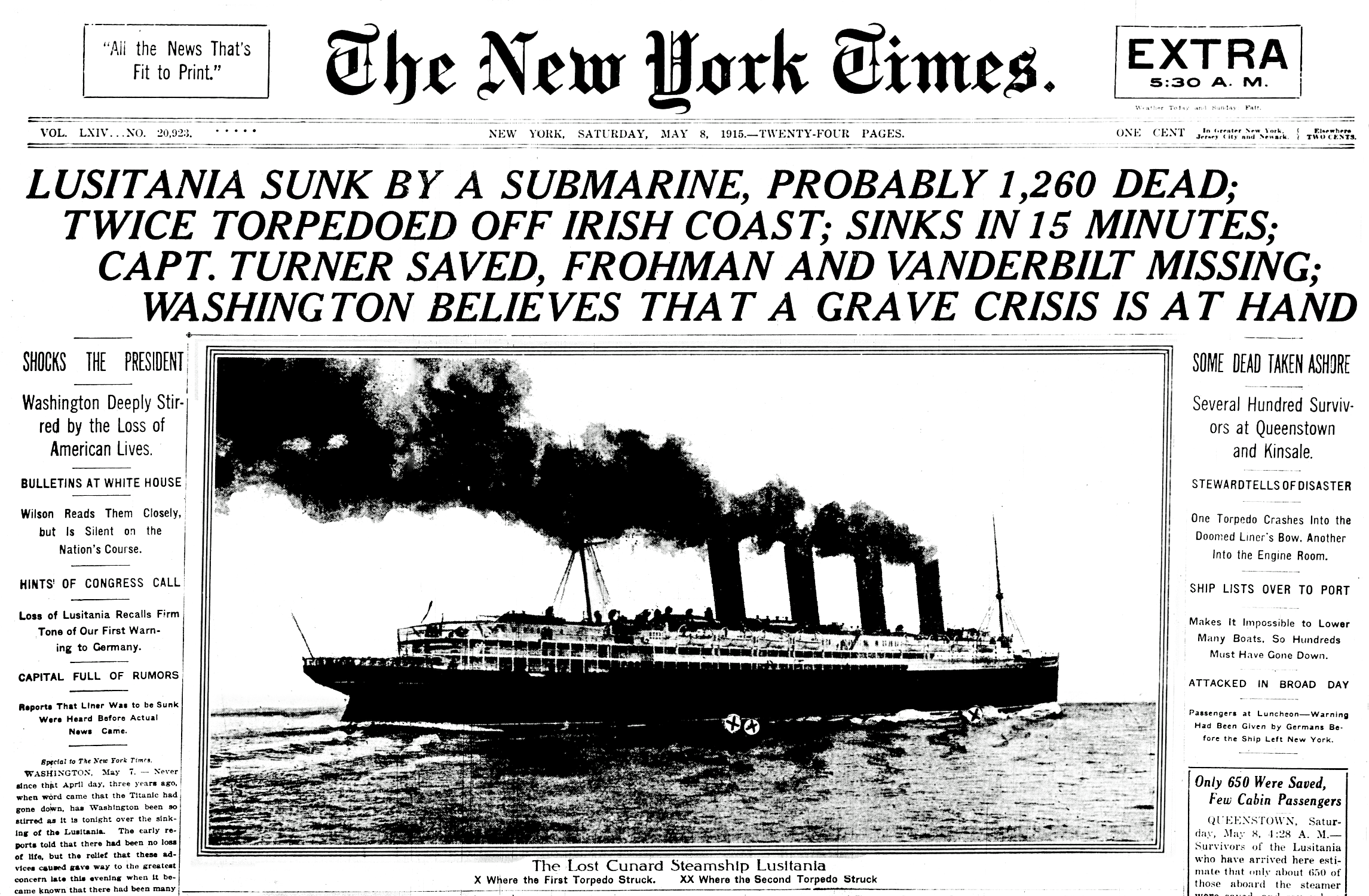
The front page of the May 8, 1915 edition of The New York Times covering the sinking of R.M.S. Lusitania

Britain used its large navy to prevent cargo vessels entering German ports, mainly by intercepting them in the North Sea between the coasts of Scotland and Norway. By the end of 1915, the Royal Navy had successfully interdicted and stopped the naval shipment of most war supplies and food to Germany. Neutral American merchant cargo ships that tried to trade with Germany were seized or turned back by the Royal Navy in outlying waters who viewed such trade as in direct conflict with the Allies' war efforts. The impact from the blockade became apparent very slowly because Germany and its allies controlled extensive farmlands and raw materials on the continent of Europe and could trade with land-bordering neutral countries like Sweden and the Netherlands who were not themselves blockaded by the British or French. However, because Germany and adjacent Central Powers ally Austria-Hungary had decimated their agricultural production by drafting and taking so many farmers and supplies of nitrate fertilisers into their armies, and the Allies were able to pressure neutral countries into reducing exports, the situation worsened, with the "turnip winter" of 1916–1917 an example of the emerging severe shortages in Central Europe. The situation at the start of 1917 was such that there was clear pressure on the German leadership to avoid a "war of exhaustion", while the softening of neutral trade reduced the importance to keep the neutral countries on side.

Germany had considered a blockade from 1914. "England wants to starve us", said Grand Admiral Alfred von Tirpitz (1849–1930), the man who built the Imperial German Navy fleet after 1871 with the unification of Germany during the last few decades and who remained a key advisor to the German Emperor / Kaiser Wilhelm II. "We can play the same game. We can bottle her up and destroy every ship that endeavors to break the blockade". Admiral Tirpitz wanted to sink or scare off merchant and passenger ships en route to Britain. He and others in the Admiralty reasoned that since the island of Britain depended on imports of food, raw materials, and manufactured goods, preventing a substantial number of ships from supplying Britain would effectively undercut its long-term ability to maintain an army on the Western Front and potentially force Britain into speedy surrender. Such strategy would also give an essential, war winning role to the German Imperial Navy, who had been mostly passive in the war thus far due to being unable to challenge the powerful Royal Navy surface warship fleet.

While Germany had ample shipyard capacity to build hundreds of U-boats, they had only nine long-range U-boats at the start of the war in August 1914. Nevertheless, the outgoing head of the German Admiralty Hugo von Pohl (1855–1916), declared the beginning of the first round of unrestricted submarine warfare six months after the war began in February 1915. However, instead of ceasing shipping to Britain and blaming the British (as the Germans positioned the move as a reprisal) as the Germans anticipated, the United States demanded that Germany respect the earlier peace-time international agreements upon "freedom of the seas", which protected neutral American and other ships on the high seas from seizure or sinking by either belligerent. Furthermore, Americans insisted on strict accountability for the deaths of innocent American civilians, demanding an apology, compensation and suggesting that it is grounds for a declaration of war.

While the British Royal Navy frequently violated America's neutral rights by defining contraband very broadly in their naval blockade of Germany, German submarine warfare threatened American lives. Wilson's top advisor, Colonel Edward M. House (1858–1938), commented that "The British have gone as far as they possibly could in violating neutral rights, though they have done it in the most courteous way". Further, while the British justified their argument with an appeal to precedent, the Germans claimed that they should be allowed to use their new weapon to its best potential and so existing rules and norms need not apply. This is especially exemplified when German submarines torpedoed ships without warning, causing sailors and passengers to drown. Though in practice this was initially rare, since U-boats preferred to attack on the surface, this strategy was justified by claims that submarines were so vulnerable that they dared not surface near merchant ships that might be carrying guns and which were too small to rescue submarine crews. The Americans countered that if the new weapon cannot be used while protecting civilian lives, it should not be used at all.

From February 1915, despite the United States warning Germany about the misuse of submarines, several incidents occurred where neutral ships were attacked or Americans killed. After the Thrasher incident, the German Imperial Embassy warned US citizens against boarding vessels to Britain, which would have to face German attack. Then on May 7, Germany torpedoed the British ocean liner RMS Lusitania, sinking her. This act of aggression caused the loss of 1,199 civilian lives, including 128 US citizens. The sinking of a large, unarmed passenger ship, combined with the previous stories of atrocities in Belgium, shocked Americans and turned public opinion hostile to Germany, although not yet to the point of war. Wilson issued a warning to Germany affirming it would face "strict accountability" if it killed more American citizens. Berlin acquiesced, ordering its submarines to avoid passenger ships.

By January 1917, however, Field Marshal Paul von Hindenburg and General Erich Ludendorff decided that an unrestricted submarine blockade was the only way to achieve a decisive victory. They demanded that Kaiser Wilhelm order unrestricted submarine warfare be resumed. Germany knew this decision meant war with the United States, but they gambled that they could win before the United States' potential strength could be mobilized. However, they overestimated how many ships they could sink and thus the extent Britain would be weakened. Finally, they did not foresee that convoys could and would be used to defeat their efforts. They believed that the United States was so weak militarily that it could not be a factor on the Western Front for more than a year and that submarines would stop the transport of troops anyway. The civilian government in Berlin objected, but the Kaiser sided with his military.

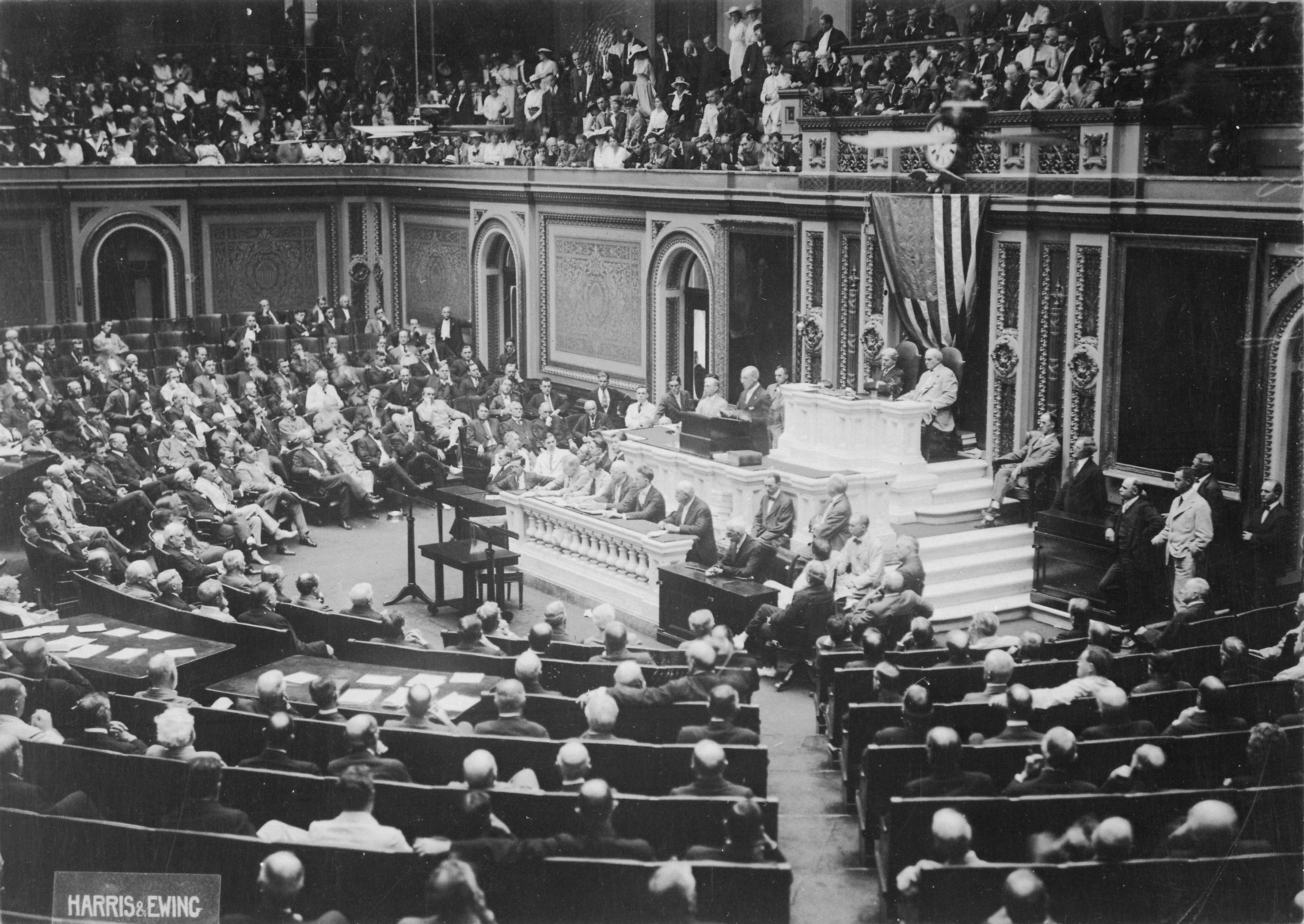
President Wilson announces the break in official relations with the German Empire, resulting from unrestricted submarine warfare, in an address to Congress on February 3, 1917

The second round of unrestricted submarine warfare was communicated to the Americans on January 31, 1917. The State Department had some indications that the campaign would come, but Wilson declared to his cabinet that the announcement had come as a complete surprise. The announcement was especially galling due to Wilson's "peace without victory" speech nine days earlier, as well as ongoing discussions on US opposition to British use of armed merchant ships. The Germans started targeting American vessels the very next day.

=== Business considerations ===
The beginning of war in Europe coincided with the end of the recession of 1913–1914 in the US. Exports to belligerent nations rose rapidly over the first four years of the War from $824.8 million in 1913 to $2.25 billion in 1917. Loans from American financial institutions to the Allied nations in Europe also increased dramatically over the same period. Economic activity towards the end of this period boomed as government resources aided the production of the private sector. Between 1914 and 1917, industrial production increased 32% and GNP increased by almost 20%. The improvements to industrial production in the United States outlasted the war. The capital build-up that had allowed US companies to supply belligerents and the US Army resulted in a greater long-run rate of production even after the war had ended in 1918.

The J.P. Morgan Bank offered assistance in the wartime financing of Britain and France from the earliest stages of the conflict through the US's entrance in 1917. J.P. Morgan's New York office, was designated as the primary financial agent to the British government starting in 1914 after successful lobbying by the British ambassador, Sir Cecil Spring Rice. The same bank would later take a similar role in France. J.P. Morgan & Co. became the primary issuer of loans to the French government, providing the capital of US investors, operating from their French affiliate Morgan, Harjes. Relations between Morgan and the French government became tense as the war raged on with no end in sight however. France's ability to borrow from other sources diminished, leading to greater lending rates and a depressing of the value of the franc. After the war ended, J.P. Morgan & Co. continued to aid the French government financially through monetary stabilization and debt relief.

Because the United States was still a declared neutral state, the financial dealings of United States banks in Europe caused a great deal of contention between Wall Street and the US government. Secretary of State William Jennings Bryan strictly opposed financial support of warring nations and wanted to ban loans to the belligerents in August 1914. He told President Wilson that "refusal to loan to any belligerent would naturally tend to hasten a conclusion of the war." Wilson at first agreed, but then reversed himself when France argued that if it was legal to buy US goods then it was legal to take out credits on the purchase.

J.P. Morgan issued loans to France including one in March 1915 and, following negotiations with the Anglo-French Financial Commission, another joint loan to Britain and France in October 1915, the latter amounting to US$500,000,000. Although the stance of the US government was that stopping such financial assistance could hasten the end of the war and therefore save lives, little was done to insure adherence to the ban on loans, in part due to pressure from Allied governments and US business interests.

The US steel industry had faced difficulties and declining profits during the recession of 1913–1914. As war began in Europe, however, the increased demand for tools of war began a period of heightened productivity that alleviated many US industrial companies from the low-growth environment of the recession. Bethlehem Steel took particular advantage of the increased demand for armaments abroad. Prior to US entrance into the war, these companies benefited from unrestricted commerce with sovereign customers abroad. After President Wilson issued his declaration of war, the companies were subjected to price controls created by the US Trade Commission in order to ensure that the US armed forces would have access to the necessary armaments.

By the end of the war in 1918, Bethlehem Steel had produced 65,000 pounds of forged military products and 70 million pounds of armor plate, 1.1 billion pounds of steel for shells, and 20.1 million rounds of artillery ammunition for Britain and France. Bethlehem Steel took advantage of the domestic armaments market and produced 60% of the US weaponry and 40% of the artillery shells used in the war. Even with price controls and a lower profit margin on manufactured goods, the profits resulting from wartime sales expanded the company into the third largest manufacturing company in the country. Bethlehem Steel became the primary arms supplier for the United States and other allied powers again in 1939.

=== Views of the elites ===
Historians divide the views of US political, social and business leaders into four distinct groups:

The first of these were the Non-Interventionists, a loosely affiliated and politically diverse anti-war movement which sought to keep the United States out of the conflict altogether. Members of this group tended to view the war as a clash between the imperialist and militaristic great powers of Europe, whom they deemed to be corrupt and unworthy of support. Others were pacifists, who objected on moral grounds. Prominent leaders included Democrats like former Secretary of State William Jennings Bryan, industrialist Henry Ford and publisher William Randolph Hearst; Republicans such as Senator Robert M. La Follette of Wisconsin and Senator George W. Norris of Nebraska; and Progressive activist Jane Addams.

At the far-left end of the political spectrum, the Socialists, led by their perennial candidate for President, Eugene V. Debs, and movement veterans like Victor L. Berger and Morris Hillquit, were staunch anti-militarists. They were opposed to any US intervention, branding the conflict as a "capitalist war" which US workers should resist. However, after the US joined the war in April 1917, a schism developed between the anti-war party leadership and a pro-war faction of socialist writers and intellectuals led by John Spargo, William English Walling and E. Haldeman-Julius. This clique founded the rival Social Democratic League of America to promote the war effort among their fellow Socialists.

Next were the more moderate Liberal-Internationalists. This nominally progressive group reluctantly supported US entry into the war against Germany, with the postwar goal of establishing strong international institutions designed to peacefully resolve future conflicts between nations and to promote liberal democratic values more broadly. This camp's views were advocated by interest groups such as the League to Enforce Peace. Adherents included U.S. President Woodrow Wilson, his influential advisor Edward M. House, former President William Howard Taft, chairman of the Commission for Relief in Belgium Herbert Hoover, Wall Street financier Bernard Baruch, and Harvard University President Abbott Lawrence Lowell.

Finally, there were the Atlanticists. Politically conservative and unambiguously pro-Allied, this faction had championed US intervention in the war since the sinking of the Lusitania and also strongly supported the Preparedness Movement. Proponents also advocated for an enduring postwar alliance with Great Britain, which they saw as vital to maintaining the future security of the US. Prominent among the Anglophile Eastern establishment, supporters included former U.S. President Theodore Roosevelt, Major General Leonard Wood, lawyer and diplomat Joseph Hodges Choate, former Secretary of War Henry Stimson, and Senators Henry Cabot Lodge of Massachusetts and Elihu Root of New York.

== Public opinion ==
=== Parties ===
A surprising factor in the development of US public opinion was how little the political parties became involved. Wilson and the Democrats in 1916 campaigned on the slogan "He kept us out of war!", saying a Republican victory would mean war with both Mexico and Germany. His position probably was critical in winning the western states. Charles Evans Hughes, the GOP candidate, insisted on downplaying the war issue.

The Socialist Party of America talked peace. Socialist rhetoric declared the European conflict to be "an imperialist war" blaming the war on capitalism and pledged total opposition. "A bayonet", its propaganda said, "was a weapon with a worker at each end". When war was declared, however, many Socialists, including much of the party's intellectual leadership, supported the decision and sided with the pro-Allied efforts. The majority, led by Eugene V. Debs (the party's presidential candidate from 1900 to 1912), remained ideological and die-hard opponents. Many socialists came under investigation from the Espionage Act of 1917 and many suspected of treason were arrested, including Debs. This increased the Socialists' and anti-war groups' resentment toward the US government.

=== Workers, farmers, and African Americans ===
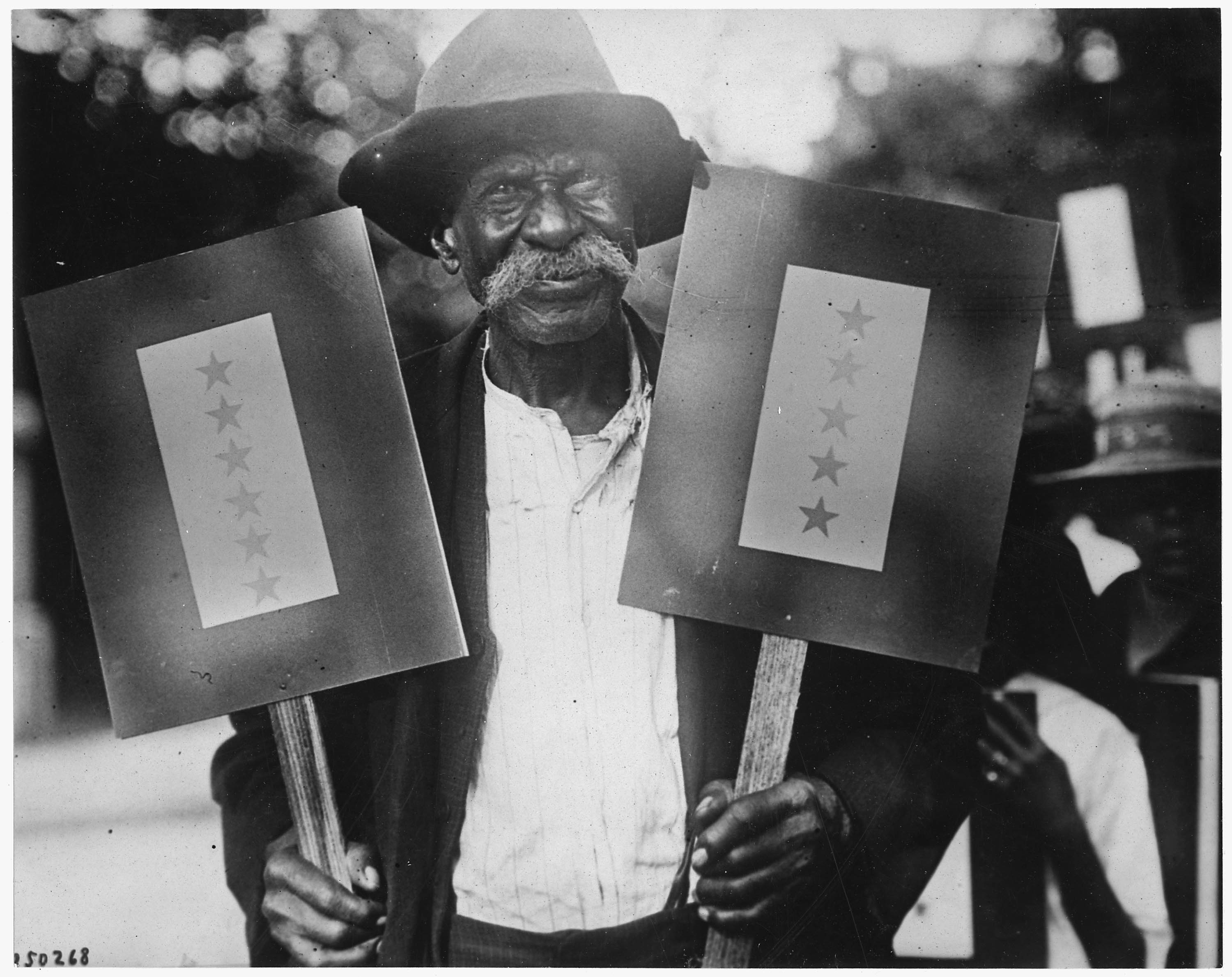
Ike Sims of Atlanta, Georgia, 87 years old, had eleven sons in the service

The working class was relatively quiet and tended to divide along ethnic lines. At the beginning of the war, neither working men nor farmers took a large interest in the debates on war preparation. Samuel Gompers, head of the AFL labor movement, denounced the war in 1914 as "unnatural, unjustified, and unholy", but by 1916 he was supporting Wilson's limited preparedness program, against the objections of Socialist union activists. In 1916 the labor unions supported Wilson on domestic issues and ignored the war question.

The war at first disrupted the cotton market; the Royal Navy blockaded shipments to Germany, and prices fell from 11 cents a pound to only 4 cents. By 1916, however, the British decided to bolster the price to 10 cents to avoid losing Southern support. The cotton growers seem to have moved from neutrality to intervention at about the same pace as the rest of the nation. Midwestern farmers generally opposed the war, particularly those of German and Scandinavian descent. The Midwest became the stronghold of isolationism; other remote rural areas also saw no need for war.

The African-American community did not take a strong position one way or the other. A month after Congress declared war, W. E. B. Du Bois called on African-Americans to "fight shoulder to shoulder with the world to gain a world where war shall be no more". Once the war began and black men were drafted, they worked to achieve equality. Many had hoped the community's help in the war efforts abroad would earn civil rights at home. When such civil liberties were still not granted, many African-Americans grew tired of waiting for recognition of their rights as American citizens.

=== South ===
There was a strong antiwar element among poor rural whites in the South and border states. In rural Missouri for example, distrust of powerful eastern influences focused on the risk that Wall Street would lead the US into war. Across the South poor white farmers warned each other that "a rich man's war meant a poor man's fight," and they wanted nothing of it. Antiwar sentiment was strongest among Christians affiliated with the Churches of Christ, the Holiness movement and Pentecostal churches. Congressman James Hay, Democrat of Virginia was the powerful chairman of the House Committee on Military Affairs. He repeatedly blocked prewar efforts to modernize and enlarge the army. Preparedness was not needed because Americans were already safe, he insisted in January 1915:

Isolated as we are, safe in our vastness, protected by a great navy, and possessed of an army sufficient for any emergency that may arise, we may disregard the lamentations and predictions of the militarists.

Educated, urban, middle-class Southerners generally supported entering the war, and many worked on mobilization committees. In contrast to this many rural southern whites opposed entering the war. Those with more formal education were more in favor of entering the war and those in the South with less formal education were more likely to oppose entering the war. Letters to newspapers with spelling or grammatical errors overwhelmingly opposed entry into the war; letters without errors overwhelmingly supported entry into the war. When the war began Texas and Georgia led the Southern states with volunteers. 1,404 from Texas, 1,397 from Georgia, 538 from Louisiana, 532 from Tennessee, 470 from Alabama, 353 from North Carolina, 316 from Florida, and 225 from South Carolina. Every Southern senator voted in favor of entering the war except Mississippi firebrand James K. Vardaman. Some regions of the South were more heavily in favor of intervention than others. Georgia had the largest portion of pro-British newspapers before the US entry into the war and provided the most volunteers per capita of any state in the country before the introduction of conscription. All five major newspapers of Southeast Georgia were outspokenly Anglophilic throughout the war and highlighted German atrocities such as the rape of Belgium and execution of British nurse Edith Cavell. Other magazines with nationwide distribution which were pro-British such as The Outlook and The Literary Digest had a disproportionately high distribution throughout every region of the state of Georgia as well as the region of northern Alabama in the area around Huntsville and Decatur (when the war began there were 470 volunteers from the state of Alabama, of these, over 400 came from Huntsville-Decatur region). Support for US entry into the war was also pronounced in central Tennessee. Letters to newspapers which expressed pro-British, anti-German or pro-interventionist sentiment were common. In between October 1914 and April 1917, letters about the war to newspapers from Tennessee included at least one of these three sentiments. In the Tennessee counties of Cheatham County, Robertson County, Sumner County, Wilson County, Rutherford County, Williamson County, Maury County, Marshall County, Bedford County, Coffee County and Cannon County over half of the letters contained all three of these elements. In South Carolina there was support for the US entering the war. Led by Governor Richard I. Manning, the cities of Greenville, Spartanburg, and Columbia had started lobbying for army training centers in their communities, for both economic and patriotic reasons, in preparation for US entry into the war. Similarly, Charleston had interned a German freighter in 1914, and when the freighter's skeleton crew tried to block Charleston harbor they were all arrested and imprisoned. From that point on Charleston was buzzing with "war fever." 1915, 1916 and early 1917 were all years when Charleston and the low country coastal counties to the south of Charleston were gripped by sentiment that was very "pro-British and anti-German."

=== German Americans ===
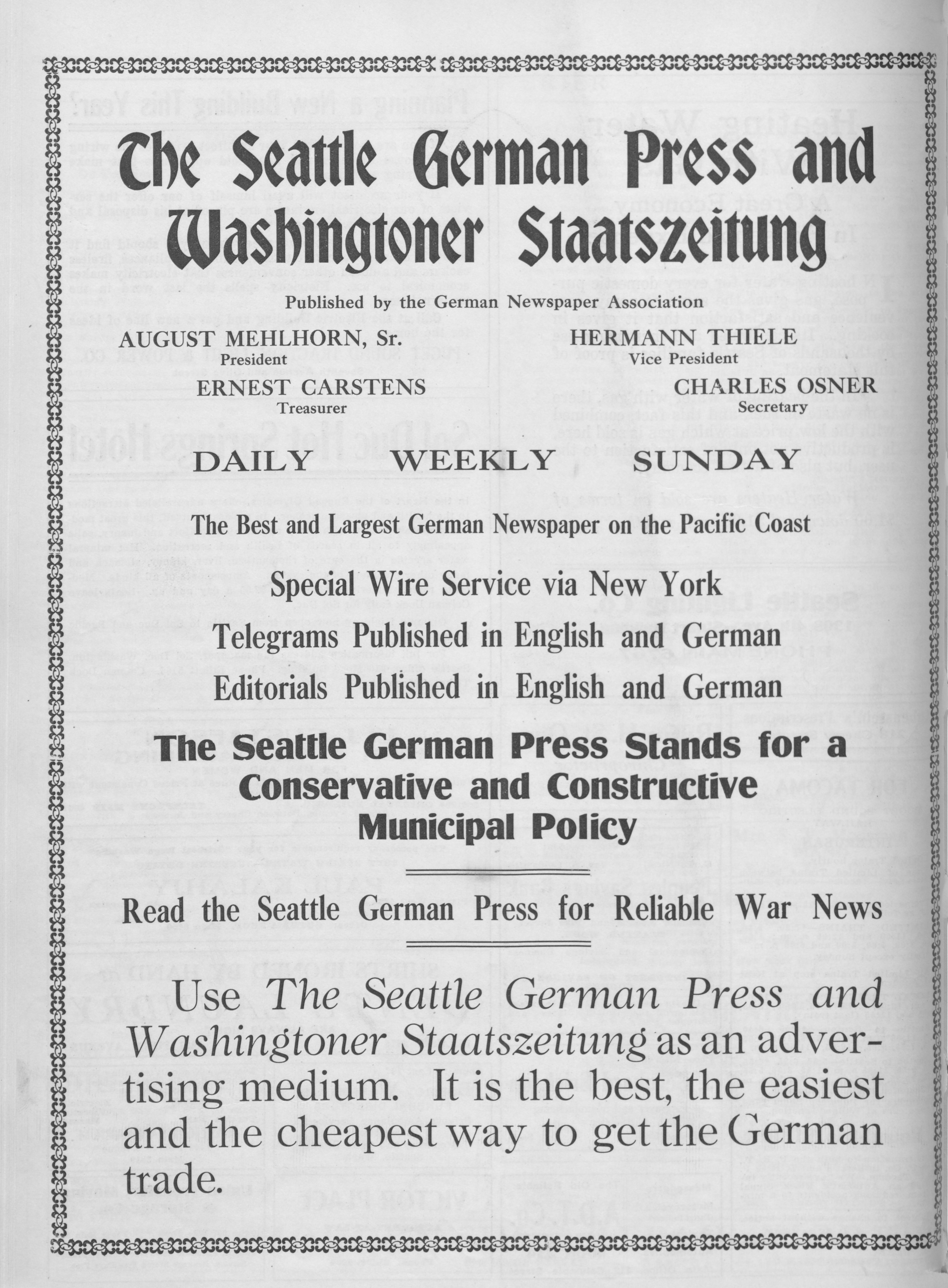
A full-page ad in Seattle magazine The Town Crier (August 7, 1915) promotes the city's two German-American newspapers, one in English and one in German, and promises "Reliable War News".

German Americans by this time usually had only weak ties to Germany; however, they were fearful of negative treatment they might receive if the United States entered the war (such mistreatment was already happening to German-descent citizens in Canada and Australia). Almost none called for intervening on Germany's side, instead calling for neutrality and speaking of the superiority of German culture. As more nations were drawn into the conflict, however, the English-language press increasingly supported Britain, while the German-American media called for neutrality while also defending Germany's position. Chicago's Germans worked to secure a complete embargo on all arms shipments to Europe. In 1916, large crowds in Chicago's Germania celebrated the Kaiser's birthday, something they had not done before the war. German Americans in early 1917 still called for neutrality, but proclaimed that if a war came they would be loyal to the United States. By this point, they had been excluded almost entirely from national discourse on the subject. German-American Socialists in Milwaukee, Wisconsin actively campaigned against entry into the war.

=== Christian churches and pacifists ===
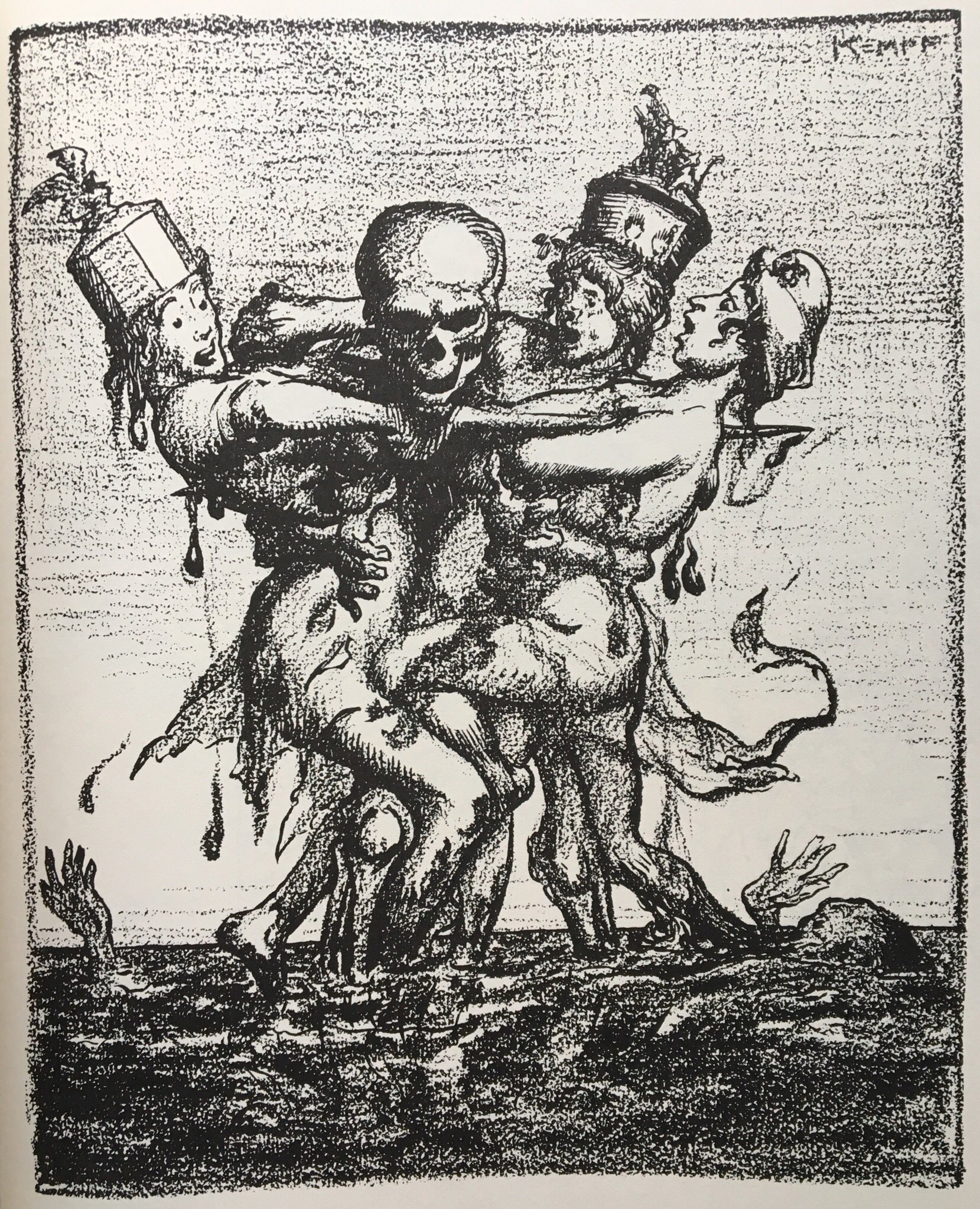
Come on in, America, the Blood's Fine! (1917) by M.A. Kempf.

Leaders of most religious groups (except the Episcopalians) tended to pacifism, as did leaders of the woman's movement. The Methodists and Quakers were among the vocal opponents of the war. President Wilson, a devout Presbyterian, often framed the war in terms of good and evil in an appeal for religious support of the war.

A concerted effort was made by pacifists including Jane Addams, Oswald Garrison Villard, David Starr Jordan, Henry Ford, Lillian Wald, and Carrie Chapman Catt. Their goal was to encourage Wilson's efforts to mediate an end of the war by bringing the belligerents to the conference table. Finally in 1917 Wilson convinced some of them that to be truly anti-war they needed to support what he promised would be "a war to end all wars".

Once war was declared, the more liberal denominations, which had endorsed the Social Gospel, called for a war for righteousness that would uplift all mankind. The theme—an aspect of American exceptionalism—was that God had chosen America as his tool to bring redemption to the world.

US Catholic bishops maintained a general silence toward the issue of intervention. Millions of Catholics lived in both warring camps, and Catholic Americans tended to split on ethnic lines in their opinions toward US involvement in the war. At the time, heavily Catholic towns and cities in the east and Midwest often contained multiple parishes, each serving a single ethnic group, such as Irish, German, Italian, Polish, or English. US Catholics of Irish and German descent opposed intervention most strongly. Pope Benedict XV made several attempts to negotiate a peace. All of his efforts were rebuffed by both the Allies and the Germans, and throughout the war the Vatican maintained a policy of strict neutrality.

=== Jewish Americans ===
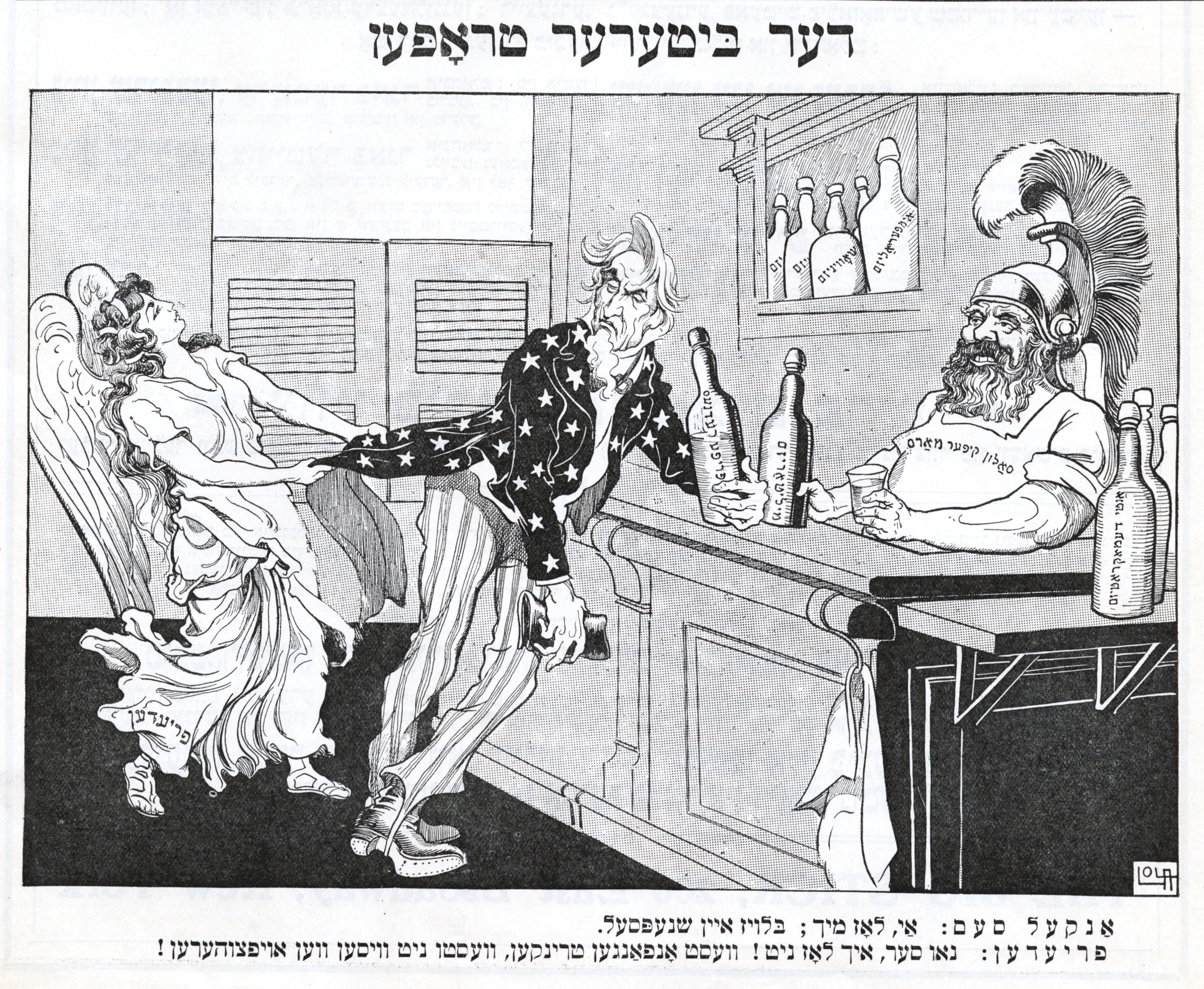
A Yiddish anti-war cartoon by Jewish artist Leon Israel shows the personification of Peace attempting to pull Uncle Sam away from the saloon of the war god Mars.

In 1914–1916, there were few Jewish Americans in favor of US entry into the war. New York City, with its Jewish community numbering 1.5 million, was a center of antiwar activism, much of which was organized by labor unions which were primarily on the political left and therefore opposed to a war that they viewed to be a battle between several great powers.

Some Jewish communities worked together during the war years to provide relief to Jewish communities in Eastern Europe decimated by fighting, famine and scorched earth policies of the Russian and Austro-German armies.

Of greatest concern to Jewish Americans was the tsarist government in Russia due its toleration of pogroms and allegedly following antisemitic policies. As historian Joseph Rappaport reported through his study of Yiddish press during the war, "The pro-Germanism of America's immigrant Jews was an inevitable consequence of their Russophobia." However, after the February Revolution of 1917 led to the transformation of Russia into a republic, a major obstacle was removed for those Jews who refused to support US entry into the war on the side of Russia. The draft went smoothly in New York City, and left-wing opposition to the war largely collapsed when Zionists saw the possibility of using the war to demand a state of Israel.

=== Irish-Americans ===
The most effective domestic opponents of the war were Irish-American Catholics. Many had little interest in the continent; despite traditional hostility towards the United Kingdom and British Empire, some Irish Americans took a more neutral stance on the issue of aiding the Entente on account of the recently passed Government of Ireland Act 1914, allowing Irish Home Rule. However, the Act was suspended until the war ended. John Redmond and the Irish Parliamentary Party (IPP) declared that Irish Volunteers should support the US's pro-Allied war efforts first; his political opponents argued that it was not the time to support Britain in its attempt to "strengthen and expand her empire". The attacks on the IPP and pro-Allied press showed a firm belief that a German victory would hasten the achievement of an independent Irish state. Yet rather than proposing intervention on behalf of the Germans, Irish American leaders and organizations focused on demanding US neutrality. But the increased contact between militant Irish nationalists and German agents in the United States only fueled concerns of where the primary loyalties of Irish Americans lay. Nevertheless, nearly 1,000 Irish-born Americans died fighting with the US armed forces in WWI. The Easter Rising in Dublin in April 1916 was defeated within a week and its leaders executed by firing squad. Both the mainstream Irish and US press treated the uprising as foolish and misguided, and later joined the British press in suspecting it was largely created and planned by the Germans. Overall public opinion remained faithfully pro-Entente.

In many major US cities, Irish-Americans dominated the Democratic Party, forcing Wilson to take into account their political viewpoints. Irish-American political efforts influenced the United States into defining its own objectives from the war separate from those of its allies, which were primarily (among other objectives) self-determination for the various nations and ethnic groups of Europe. Wilson gave assurances he would promote Irish independence after the war which helped to secure support for his war policies. However once the war was over Wilson reneged, disappointing many Irish-Americans. Though an ideological proponent of self-determination in general, Wilson saw the Irish situation purely as an internal affair of the United Kingdom and did not perceive the dispute and the unrest in Ireland as one and the same as that being faced by the various other nationalities in Europe as fallout from World War I.

=== Pro-Allied immigrants ===
Some British immigrants worked actively for intervention. London-born Samuel Insull, Chicago's leading industrialist, for example, enthusiastically provided money, propaganda, and means for volunteers to enter the British or Canadian armies. After the United States's entry, Insull directed the Illinois State Council of Defense, with responsibility for organizing the state's mobilization.

Immigrants from eastern Europe usually cared more about politics in their homeland than politics in the United States. Spokesmen for Slavic immigrants hoped that an Allied victory would bring independence for their homelands. Large numbers of Hungarian immigrants who were liberal and nationalist in sentiment, and sought an independent Hungary, separate from the Austro-Hungarian Empire lobbied in favor of the war and allied themselves with the Atlanticist or Anglophile portion of the population. This community was largely pro-British and anti-German in sentiment. Albanian-Americans in communities such as Boston also campaigned for entry into the war and were overwhelmingly pro-British and anti-German, as well as hopeful the war would lead to an independent Albania which would be free from the Ottoman Empire. Wisconsin had the distinction of being the most isolationist state due to its many German-Americans, socialists and pacifists. However, the exception to this were pockets within the state such as the city of Green Bay. Green Bay had a large number of pro-Allied immigrants, including the largest Belgian immigrant community in the entire country, and for this reason anti-German and pro-war sentiment were significantly higher in Green Bay than the country overall. There was a large Serbian-American community in Alaska which also was enthusiastically in favor of US entry into World War I. In the case of Alaska, which was at the time a territory, thousands of Serbian immigrants and Serbian-Americans volunteered early to join the U.S. Army shortly after the declaration of war, after the community had been outspokenly in favor of the US's entry into the war before this. During the First World War, many Serbian Americans volunteered to fight overseas, with thousands coming from Alaska.

=== Popular pacifism ===
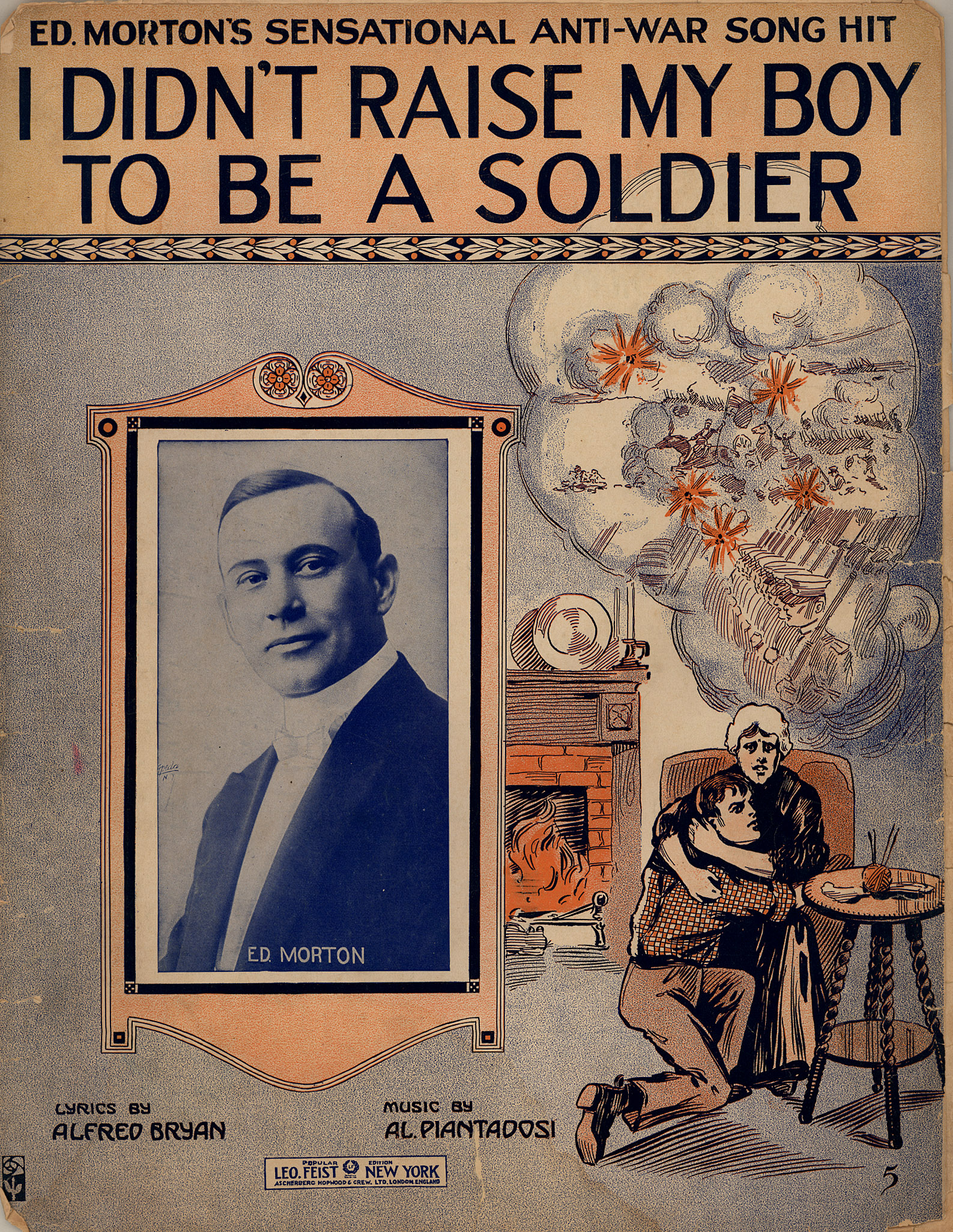
The song "I Didn't Raise My Boy To Be A Soldier" was a hit in 1915, selling 650,000 copies. Its expression of popular pacifist sentiment "helped make the pacifist movement a hard, quantifiable political reality to be reckoned with."

Henry Ford supported the pacifist cause by sponsoring a large-scale private peace mission, with numerous activists and intellectuals aboard the "Peace Ship" (the ocean liner Oscar II). Ford chartered the ship in 1915 and invited prominent peace activists to join him to meet with leaders on both sides in Europe. He hoped to create enough publicity to prompt the belligerent nations to convene a peace conference and mediate an end to the war. The mission was widely mocked by the press as a "Ship of Fools". Infighting between the activists, mockery by the press contingent aboard, and an outbreak of influenza marred the voyage. Four days after the ship arrived in neutral Norway, a beleaguered and physically ill Ford abandoned the mission and returned to the United States; he had demonstrated that independent small efforts accomplished nothing.

=== German agents ===
On July 24, 1915, the German embassy's commercial attaché, Heinrich Albert, left his briefcase on a train in New York City, where an alert Secret Service agent, Frank Burke, snatched it. Wilson let the newspapers publish the contents, which indicated a systematic effort by Berlin to subsidize friendly newspapers and block British purchases of war materials. Berlin's top espionage agent, debonnaire Franz Rintelen von Kleist, was spending millions to finance sabotage in Canada, stir up trouble between the United States and Mexico, and incite labor strikes. Germany took the blame as Americans grew ever more worried about the vulnerability of a free society to subversion. Indeed, one of the main fears Americans of all stations had in 1916–1919 was that spies and saboteurs were everywhere. This sentiment played a major role in arousing fear of Germany, and suspicions regarding everyone of German descent who could not "prove" 100% loyalty.

== Preparedness movement ==
By 1915, Americans were paying much more attention to the war. The sinking of Lusitania had a strong effect on public opinion because of the deaths of US civilians. That year, a strong "Preparedness" movement emerged. Proponents argued that the United States needed to immediately build up strong naval and land forces for defensive purposes; an unspoken assumption was that the US would fight sooner or later. General Leonard Wood (still on active duty after serving a term as Chief of Staff of the Army), former president Theodore Roosevelt, and former secretaries of war Elihu Root and Henry Stimson were the driving forces behind Preparedness, along with many of the nation's most prominent bankers, industrialists, lawyers and scions of prominent families. Indeed, there emerged an "Atlanticist" foreign policy establishment, a group of influential Americans drawn primarily from upper-class lawyers, bankers, academics, and politicians of the Northeast, committed to a strand of Anglophile internationalism. Representative was Paul D. Cravath, one of New York's foremost corporation lawyers. For Cravath, in his mid-fifties when the war began, the conflict served as an epiphany, sparking an interest in international affairs that dominated his remaining career. Fiercely Anglophile, he strongly supported US intervention in the war and hoped that close Anglo-American cooperation would be the guiding principle of postwar international organization.

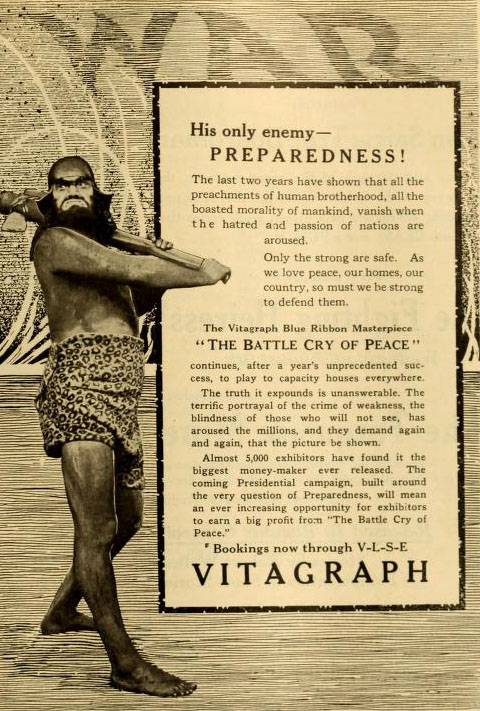
Advertisement for the film The Battle Cry of Peace

The Preparedness movement had a "realistic" philosophy of world affairs—they believed that economic strength and military muscle were more decisive than idealistic crusades focused on causes like democracy and national self-determination. Emphasizing over and over the weak state of national defenses, they showed that the US's 100,000-man Army even augmented by the 112,000 National Guardsmen, was outnumbered 20 to one by Germany's army, which was drawn from a smaller population. Similarly in 1915, the armed forces of Britain and her Empire, France, Russia, Austria-Hungary, Ottoman Empire, Italy, Bulgaria, Romania, Serbia, Belgium, Japan and Greece were all larger and more experienced than the United States military, in many cases significantly so.

Reform to them meant UMT or "universal military training". They proposed a national service program under which the 600,000 men who turned 18 every year would be required to spend six months in military training, and afterwards be assigned to reserve units. The small regular army would primarily be a training agency.

Antimilitarists complained the plan would make the US resemble Germany (which required two years' active duty). Advocates retorted that military "service" was an essential duty of citizenship, and that without the commonality provided by such service the nation would splinter into antagonistic ethnic groups. One spokesman promised that UMT would become "a real melting pot, under which the fire is hot enough to fuse the elements into one common mass of Americanism". Furthermore, they promised, the discipline and training would make for a better paid work force. Hostility to military service was strong at the time, and the program failed to win approval. In World War II, when Stimson as Secretary of War proposed a similar program of universal peacetime service, he was defeated.

Underscoring its commitment, the Preparedness movement set up and funded its own summer training camps at Plattsburgh, New York, and other sites, where 40,000 college alumni became physically fit, learned to march and shoot, and ultimately provided the cadre of a wartime officer corps. Suggestions by labor unions that talented working-class youth be invited to Plattsburgh were ignored. The Preparedness movement was distant not only from the working classes but also from the middle-class leadership of most of small-town America. It had had little use for the National Guard, which it saw as politicized, localistic, poorly armed, ill trained, too inclined to idealistic crusading (as against Spain in 1898), and too lacking in understanding of world affairs. The National Guard on the other hand was securely rooted in state and local politics, with representation from a very broad cross section of US society. The Guard was one of the nation's few institutions that (in some northern states) accepted blacks on an equal footing.

The Democratic party saw the Preparedness movement as a threat. Roosevelt, Root and Wood were prospective Republican presidential candidates. More subtly, the Democrats were rooted in localism that appreciated the National Guard, and the voters were hostile to the rich and powerful in the first place. Working with the Democrats who controlled Congress, Wilson was able to sidetrack the Preparedness forces. Army and Navy leaders were forced to testify before Congress to the effect that the nation's military was in excellent shape.

In fact, neither the army nor navy was in shape for war. The navy had fine ships but Wilson had been using them to threaten Mexico, and the fleet's readiness had suffered. The crews of the Texas and the New York, the two newest and largest battleships, had never fired a gun, and the morale of the sailors was low. In addition, it was outnumbered and outgunned when compared to the British and German navies. The army and navy air forces were tiny in size. Despite the flood of new weapons systems created by the British, Germans, French, Austro-Hungarians, Italians, and others in the war in Europe, the army was paying scant attention. For example, it was making no studies of trench warfare, poison gas, heavy artillery, or tanks and was utterly unfamiliar with the rapid evolution of aerial warfare. The Democrats in Congress tried to cut the military budget in 1915. The Preparedness movement effectively exploited the surge of outrage over the Lusitania in May 1915, forcing the Democrats to promise some improvements to the military and naval forces. Wilson, less fearful of the navy, embraced a long-term building program designed to make the fleet the equal of the Royal Navy by the mid-1920s, although this would not be achieved until World War II. "Realism" was at work here; the admirals were Mahanians and they therefore wanted a surface fleet of heavy battleships second to none—that is, equal to Britain. The facts of submarine warfare (which necessitated destroyers, not battleships) and the possibilities of imminent war with Germany (or with Britain, for that matter), were simply ignored.

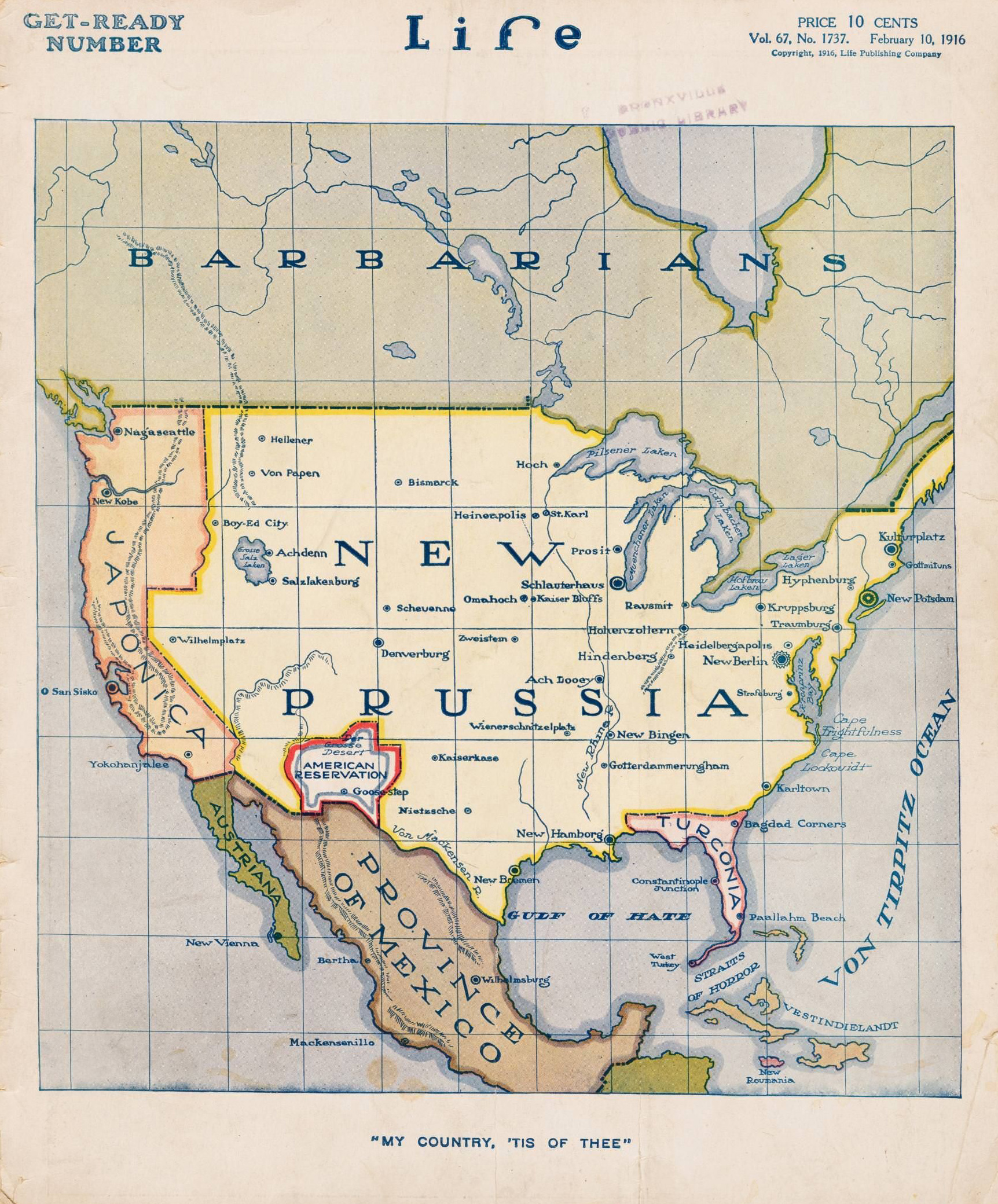
Hypothetical partition of the United States by the Central Powers that appeared on the cover of Life in 1916

Wilson's program for the Army touched off a firestorm. Secretary of War Lindley Garrison adopted many of the proposals of the Preparedness leaders, especially their emphasis on a large federal reserve and abandonment of the National Guard. Garrison's proposals not only outraged the localistic politicians of both parties, they also offended a strongly held belief shared by the liberal wing of the Progressive movement. They felt that warfare always had a hidden economic motivation. Specifically, they warned the chief warmongers were New York bankers (like J. P. Morgan) with millions at risk, profiteering munition makers (like Bethlehem Steel, which made armor, and DuPont, which made powder) and unspecified industrialists searching for global markets to control. Antiwar critics blasted them. These special interests were too powerful, especially, Senator La Follette noted, in the conservative wing of the Republican Party. The only road to peace was disarmament, reiterated Bryan.

Garrison's plan unleashed the fiercest battle in peacetime history over the relationship of military planning to national goals. In peacetime, War Department arsenals and navy yards manufactured nearly all munitions that lacked civilian uses, including warships, artillery, naval guns, and shells. Items available on the civilian market, such as food, horses, saddles, wagons, and uniforms were always purchased from civilian contractors. Armor plate (and after 1918, airplanes) was an exception that has caused unremitting controversy for a century. After World War II, the arsenals and navy yards were much less important than giant civilian aircraft and electronics firms, which became the second half of the "military-industrial complex." Peace leaders like Jane Addams of Hull House and David Starr Jordan of Stanford redoubled their efforts, and now turned their voices against the president because he was "sowing the seeds of militarism, raising up a military and naval caste". Many ministers, professors, farm spokesmen, and labor union leaders joined in, with powerful support from Claude Kitchin and his band of four dozen Southern Democrats in Congress who took control of the House Military Affairs Committee.

Wilson, in deep trouble, took his cause to the people in a major speaking tour in early 1916, a warmup for his reelection campaign that fall. Wilson seems to have won over the middle classes, but had little impact on the largely ethnic working classes and the deeply isolationist farmers. Congress still refused to budge, so Wilson replaced Garrison as Secretary of War with Newton Baker, the Democratic mayor of Cleveland and an outspoken opponent of preparedness (Garrison kept quiet, but felt Wilson was "a man of high ideals but no principles"). The upshot was a compromise passed in May 1916, as the war raged on and Berlin was debating whether the US was so weak it could be ignored. The Army was to double in size to 11,300 officers and 208,000 men, with no reserve, and a National Guard that would be enlarged in five years to 440,000 men. Summer camps on the Plattsburg model were authorized for new officers, and the government was given $20 million to build a nitrate plant of its own. Preparedness supporters were downcast, the antiwar people were jubilant: the US would now be too weak to go to war.

The House gutted Wilson's naval plans as well, defeating a "big navy" plan by 189 to 183, and scuttling the battleships. However, news arrived of the great sea battle between Britain and Germany, the Battle of Jutland. The battle was used by the navalists to argue for the primacy of seapower; they then took control in the Senate, broke the House coalition, and authorized a rapid three-year buildup of all classes of warships. A new weapons system, naval aviation, received $3.5 million, and the government was authorized to build its own armor plate factory. The very weakness of US military power encouraged Berlin to start its unrestricted submarine attacks in 1917. It knew this meant war with the US, but it could discount the immediate risk because the US Army was negligible and the new warships would not be at sea until 1919, by which time it believed the war would be over, with Germany victorious. The argument that armaments led to war was turned on its head: most Americans came to fear that failure to arm in 1916 made aggression against the US more likely.

=== Size of the military ===
The United States had remained aloof from the arms race in which the European powers had engaged during the decades leading up to the war. The US Army numbered slightly more than 100,000 active duty soldiers in 1916; by that time the French, British, Russian and German armies had all fought battles in which more than 10,000 men had been killed in one day, and fought campaigns in which total casualties had exceeded 200,000. In other words, the entire United States Army, as it stood on the eve of intervention, could be wiped out in a single week of the fighting that had characterized the war to date.

Americans felt an increasing need for a military that could command respect. As one editor put it, "The best thing about a large army and a strong navy is that they make it so much easier to say just what we want to say in our diplomatic correspondence." Berlin thus far had backed down and apologized when Washington was angry, thus boosting US self-confidence. The US's rights and honor increasingly came into focus. The slogan "Peace" gave way to "Peace with Honor". The Army remained unpopular, however. A recruiter in Indianapolis noted that, "The people here do not take the right attitude towards army life as a career, and if a man joins from here he often tries to go out on the quiet". The Preparedness movement used its easy access to the mass media to demonstrate that the War Department had no plans, no equipment, little training, no reserve, a laughable National Guard, and a wholly inadequate organization for war. At a time when European generals were directing field armies that numbered several corps, on combat fronts that stretched for dozens or hundreds of miles, no active duty US general officer had commanded more than a division. Motion pictures like The Battle Cry of Peace (1915) depicted invasions of the US homeland that demanded action.

=== Navy ===
The readiness and capability of the US Navy was a matter of controversy. The press at the time reported that the only thing the military was ready for was an enemy fleet attempting to seize New York harbor –at a time when the German battle fleet was penned up by the Royal Navy. The Navy Secretary Josephus Daniels was a journalist with pacifist leanings. He had built up the educational resources of the Navy and made its Naval War College in Newport, Rhode Island an essential experience for would-be admirals. However, he alienated the officer corps with his moralistic reforms, including no wine in the officers' mess, no hazing at the Naval Academy, and more chaplains and YMCAs. Daniels, as a newspaperman, knew the value of publicity. In 1915 he set up the Naval Consulting Board headed by Thomas Edison to obtain the advice and expertise of leading scientists, engineers, and industrialists. It popularized technology, naval expansion, and military preparedness, and was well covered in the media. But according to Coletta he ignored the nation's strategic needs, and disdaining the advice of its experts, Daniels suspended meetings of the Joint Army and Navy Board for two years because it was giving unwelcome advice, chopped in half the General Board's recommendations for new ships, reduced the authority of officers in the Navy yards where ships were built and repaired, and ignored the administrative chaos in his department. Bradley Fiske, one of the most innovative admirals in US naval history, in 1914 was Daniels' top aide; he recommended a reorganization that would prepare for war, but Daniels refused. Instead he replaced Fiske in 1915 and brought in for the new post of Chief of Naval Operations an unknown captain, William Benson. Chosen for his compliance, Benson proved to be a wily bureaucrat who was more interested in preparing the US Navy for the possibility of an eventual showdown with Britain than an immediate one with Germany. Benson told Sims he "would as soon fight the British as the Germans". Proposals to send observers to Europe were blocked, leaving the Navy in the dark about the success of the German submarine campaign. Admiral William Sims charged after the war that in April 1917, only ten percent of the Navy's warships were fully manned; the rest lacked 43% of their seamen. Light antisubmarine ships were few in number, as if Daniels had been unaware of the German submarine menace that had been the focus of foreign policy for two years. The Navy's only warfighting plan, the "Black Plan" assumed the Royal Navy did not exist and that German battleships were moving freely about the Atlantic and the Caribbean and threatening the Panama Canal. Daniels' tenure would have been even less successful save for the energetic efforts of Assistant Secretary Franklin D. Roosevelt, who effectively ran the Department. His most recent biographer concludes that, "it is true that Daniels had not prepared the navy for the war it would have to fight."

== Decision for war ==
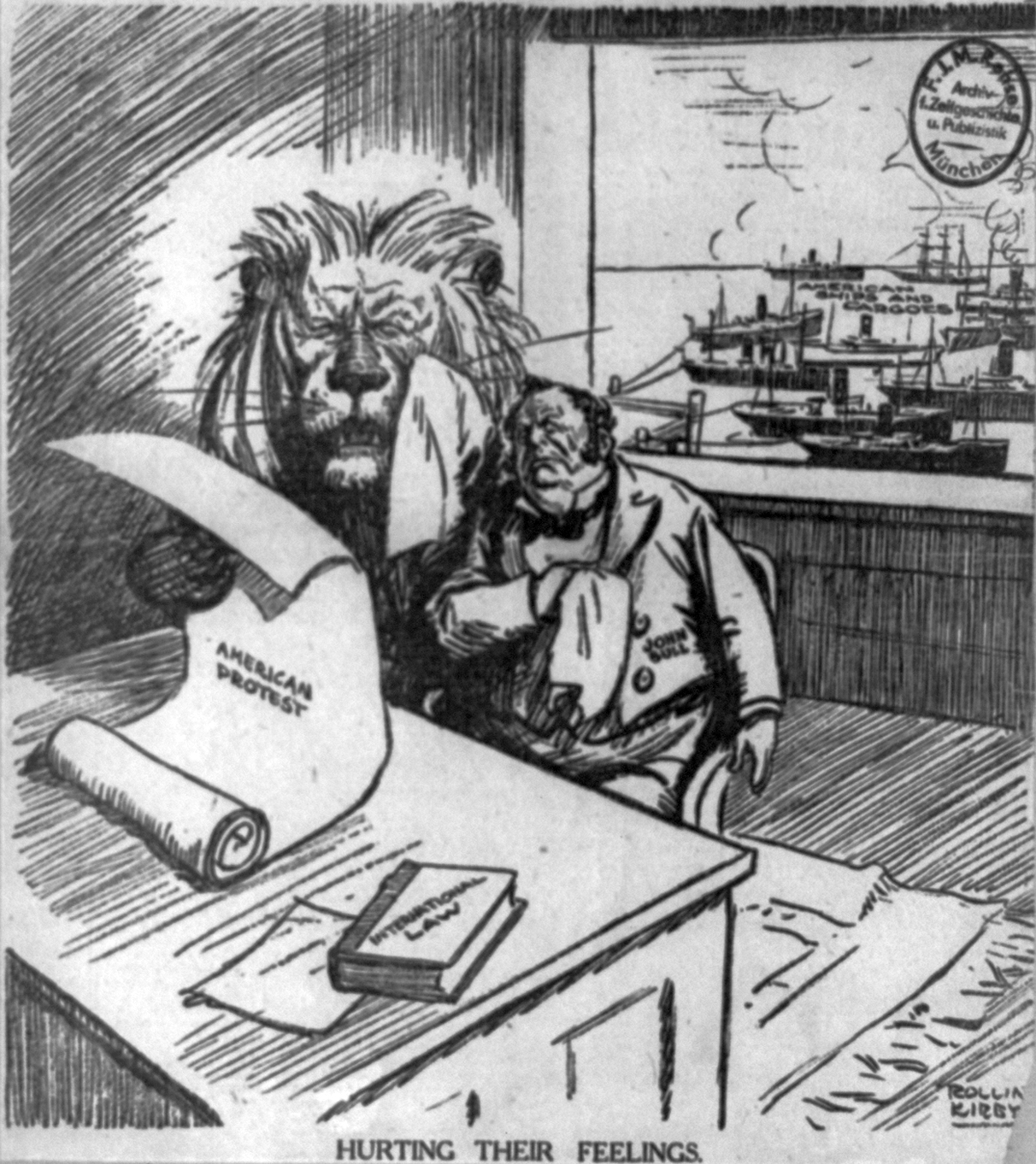
"Hurting Their Feelings": Political cartoon from November 9, 1915, shows the British lion and John Bull reading a newspaper about US anti-war protests and crying, while US ships and cargo appear in the harbor behind them

By 1916 a sense of national self-interest and US nationalism was growing. The high casualty figures in Europe were sobering—two vast battles caused over one million casualties each. efforts to find a peaceful solution had been unavailing.

=== Decision making ===
Kendrick Clements claims bureaucratic decision-making was one of the main sources pushing the United States to declaring war on Germany and aligning itself with the Allies. He writes, referencing the demand for submarines to follow cruiser rules instead of simply avoiding the war zone: "The problem with the American policy toward submarine warfare that was set in February 1915 was not that it was necessarily wrong, but that it was determined almost casually, without careful analysis either of its implications or of any alternatives."

Secretary of State William Jennings Bryan spent most of the fall of 1914 out of contact with the State Department, leaving the more conservative Robert Lansing with the ability to shape US foreign policy at the time. Many seemingly small decisions made by Lansing during this time would eventually stack up, shifting US support towards the Allies.

Then, with the announcement of the U-boat campaign in February 1915, Lansing produced a draft containing the phrase "strict accountability". Initially unexplained, this gradually became a doctrine justifying the use of force.

=== Sinking of US merchant ships ===
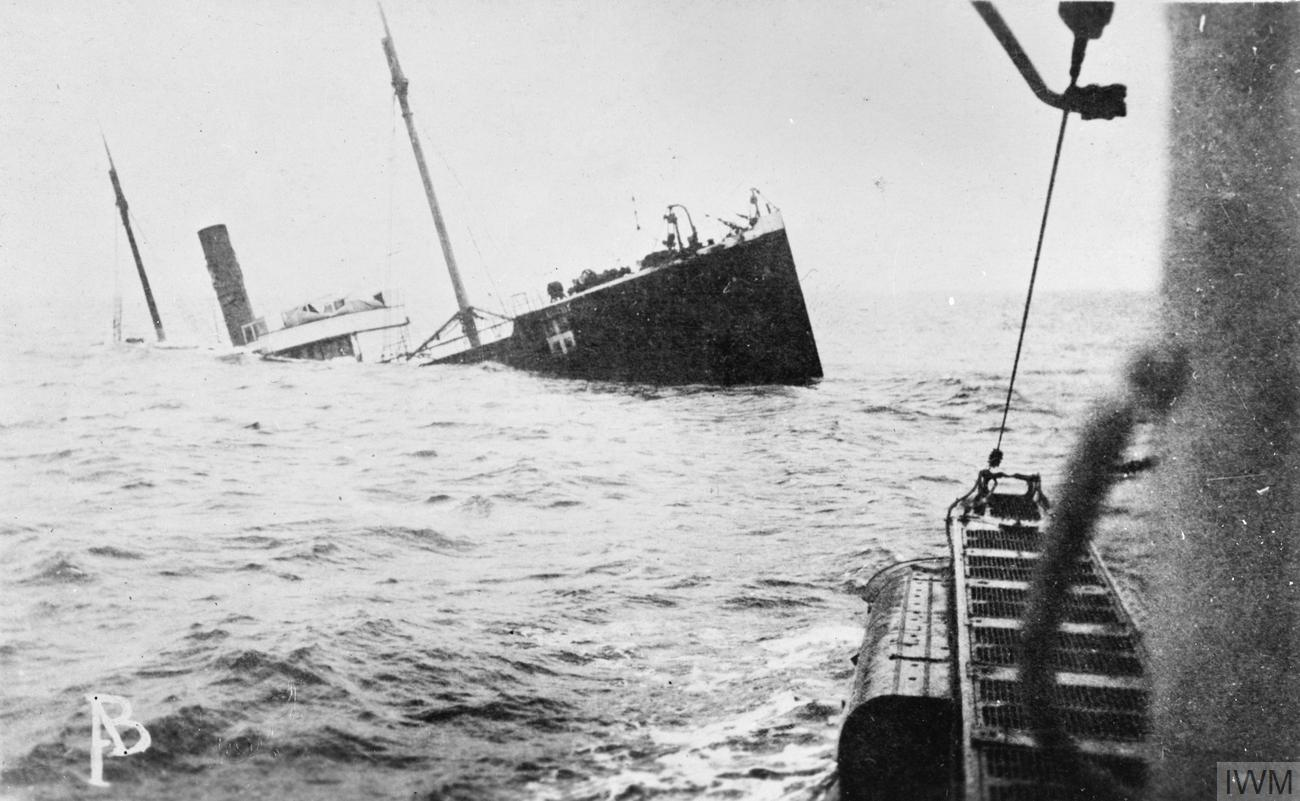
View from UC-21 of Illinois sinking

In early 1917, Kaiser Wilhelm II forced the issue. After discussions in a 9 January 1917 German Crown Council meeting, the decision was made public on January 31, 1917, to target neutral shipping in a designated war zone. This became the immediate cause of the entry of the United States into the war. Germany sank ten US merchant ships from February 3, 1917, through April 4, 1917, though news about the schooner Marguerite did not arrive until after Wilson signed the declaration of war. Outraged public opinion now overwhelmingly supported Wilson when he asked Congress for a declaration of war on April 2, 1917. It was voted approved by a Joint Session (not merely the Senate) on April 6, 1917, and Wilson signed it the following afternoon.

American-Registered ships sunk February 3, 1917 – April 4, 1917
Ship name	Type	Date	US killed	Total killed	Location	Owner	Sunk by
Housatonic	cargo ship	Feb 3	0	0	Off Scilly Isles	Housatonic Co.	U-53 Hans Rose
Lyman M. Law	schooner	Feb 12	0	0	Off Sardinia	George A. Cardine Syndicate	U-35 Lothar von Arnauld
Algonquin	cargo ship	Mar 12	0	0	Off Scilly Isles	American Star Line	U-62 Ernst Hashagen
Vigilancia	cargo ship	Mar 16	6	15	Off Plymouth	Gaston, Williams & Wigmore	U-70 Otto Wunsch
City of Memphis	cargo ship	Mar 17	0	0	Off Ireland	Ocean Steamship Company	UC-66 Herbert Pustkuchen
Illinois	oil tanker	Mar 18	0	0	Off Alderney	Texaco	UC-21 Reinhold Saltzwedel
Healdton	oil tanker	Mar 21	7	21	Off the Netherlands	Standard Oil	unknown
Aztec	cargo ship	Apr 1	11	28	Off Brest	Oriental Navigation	U-46 Leo Hillebrand
Marguerite	schooner	Apr 4	0	0	Off Sardinia	William Chase	U-35 Lothar von Arnauld
Missourian	cargo ship	Apr 4	0	0	Mediterranean Sea	American-Hawaiian Line	U-52 Hans Walther

=== Zimmermann Telegram ===
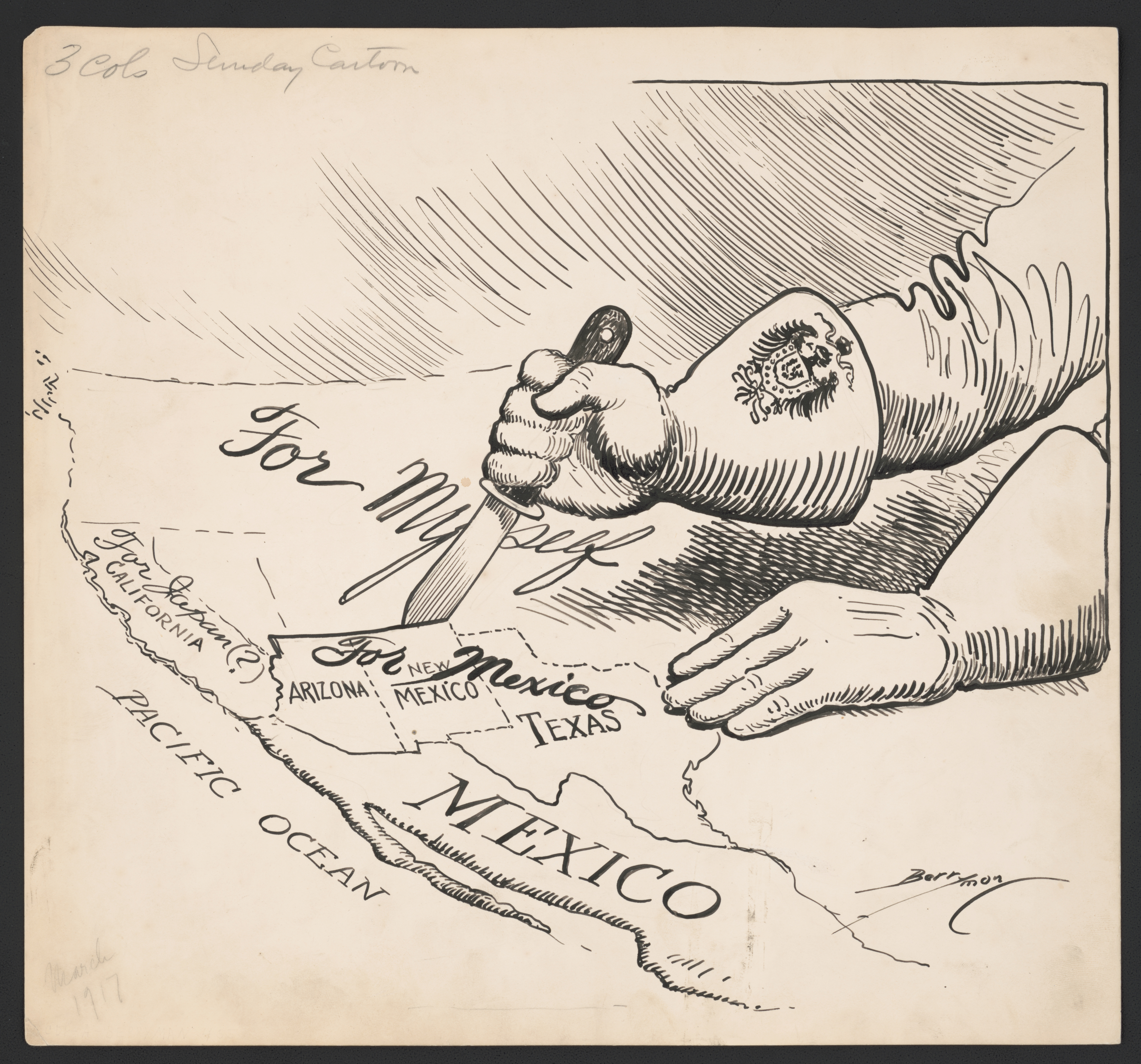
1917 political cartoon about the Zimmermann Telegram

The Germans had anticipated that unrestricted submarine warfare would lead to war and thus tried to line up new allies ahead of the announcement, especially Mexico. Arthur Zimmermann, the German foreign minister, sent the Zimmermann Telegram to Mexico on January 16, 1917. Zimmermann invited Mexico (knowing their resentment towards America since the 1848 Mexican Cession) to join in a war against the United States if the United States declared war on Germany. Germany promised to pay for Mexico's costs and to help it recover the territory forcibly annexed by the United States in 1848. These territories included the present day states of California, Nevada, Utah, most of Arizona, about half of New Mexico and a quarter of Colorado.

British intelligence intercepted and decoded the telegram and passed it to the Wilson administration. The White House released it to the press on March 1. This exacerbated American anger even as Germany continued to sink US ships, undermining the efforts of isolationists in the Senate who filibustered to block legislation for arming American merchant ships to defend themselves.

== Public opinion, moralism, and national interest ==
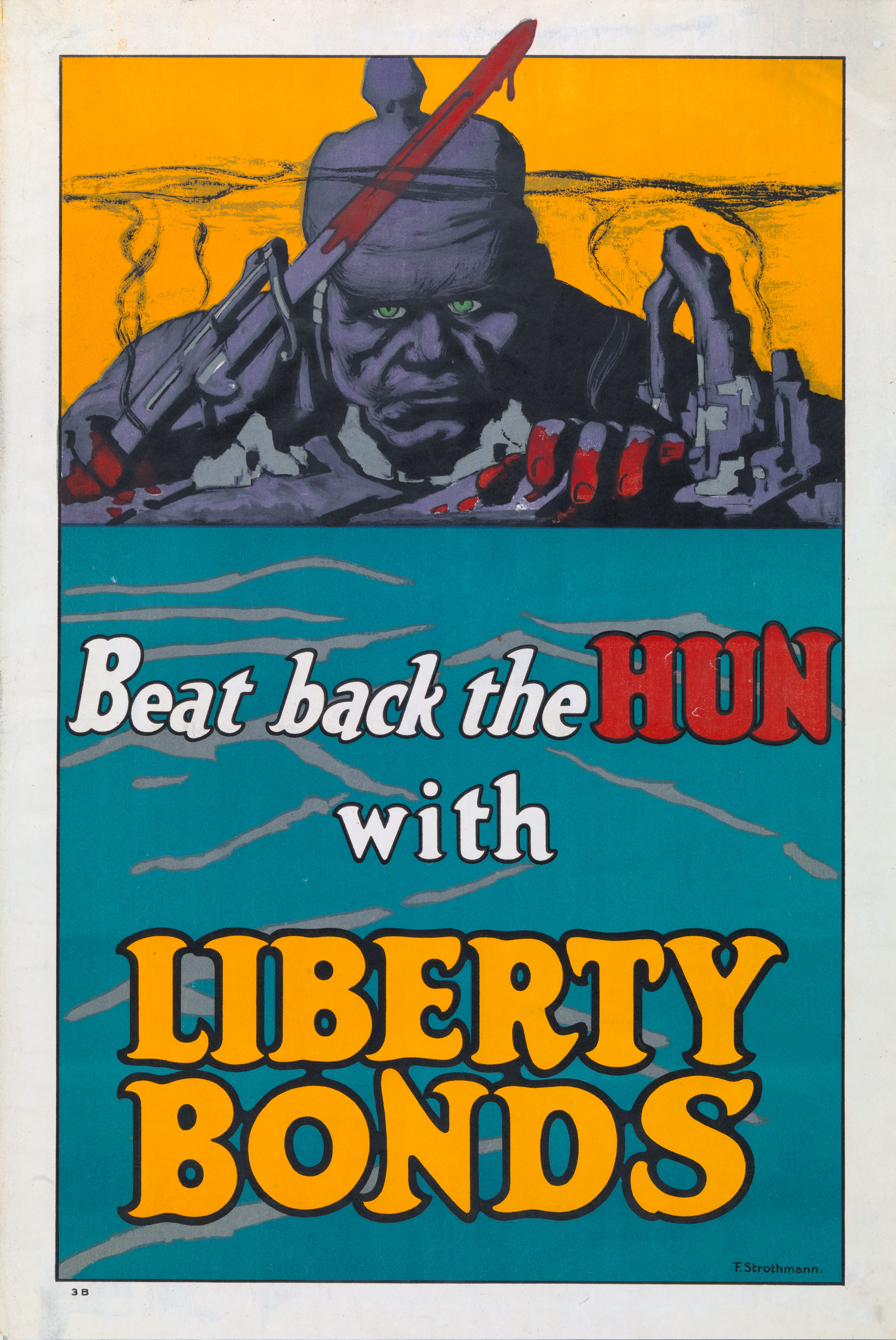
After war was declared, war bond posters negatively portrayed Germany

Historians such as Ernest R. May have approached the process of the US entry into the war as a study in how public opinion changed radically in three years' time. In 1914 most Americans called for neutrality, seeing the war as a dreadful mistake and were determined to stay out. By 1917 the same public felt just as strongly that going to war was both necessary and wise. Military leaders had little to say during this debate, and military considerations were seldom raised. The decisive questions dealt with morality and visions of the future. The prevailing attitude was that the US possessed a superior moral position as the only great nation devoted to the principles of freedom and democracy. By staying aloof from the squabbles of reactionary empires, it could preserve those ideals—sooner or later the rest of the world would come to appreciate and adopt them. In 1917 this very long-run program faced the severe danger that in the short run powerful forces adverse to democracy and freedom would triumph. Strong support for moralism came from religious leaders, women (led by Jane Addams), and from public figures like long-time Democratic leader William Jennings Bryan, the Secretary of State from 1913 to 1916. The most important moralist of all was President Woodrow Wilson—the man who dominated decision making so totally that the war has been labeled, from a US perspective, "Wilson's War".

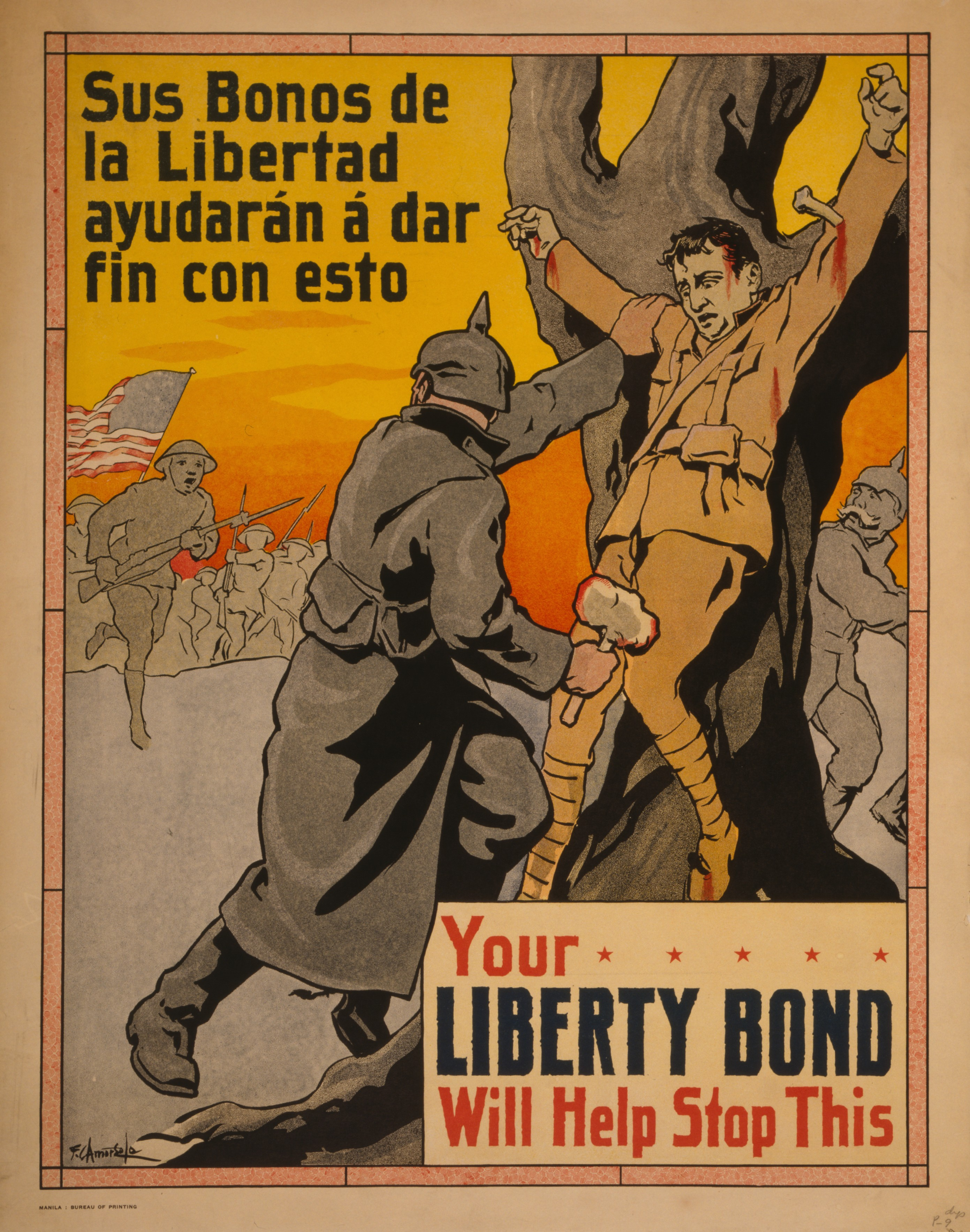
Filipino poster showing German soldiers nailing a man to a tree, as US soldiers come to his rescue, 1917

In 1917 Wilson won the support of most of the moralists by proclaiming "a war to make the world safe for democracy." If they truly believed in their ideals, he explained, now was the time to fight. The question then became whether Americans would fight for what they deeply believed in, and the answer turned out to be a resounding "Yes". Some of this attitude was mobilised by the Spirit of 1917, which evoked the Spirit of '76.

Antiwar activists at the time and in the 1930s, alleged that beneath the veneer of moralism and idealism there must have been ulterior motives. Some suggested a conspiracy on the part of New York City bankers holding $3 billion of war loans to the Allies, or steel and chemical firms selling munitions to the Allies. The interpretation was popular among left-wing Progressives (led by Senator Robert La Follette of Wisconsin) and among the "agrarian" wing of the Democratic party—including the chairman of the tax-writing Ways and Means Committee of the House. He strenuously opposed war, and when it came he rewrote the tax laws to make sure the rich paid the most. (In the 1930s neutrality laws were passed to prevent financial entanglements from dragging the nation into a war.) In 1915, Bryan thought that Wilson's pro-British sentiments had unduly influenced his policies, so he became the first Secretary of State ever to resign in protest.

However, historian Harold C. Syrett demonstrated that business in general supported neutrality. Other historians state that the pro-war element was animated not by profit but by disgust with what Germany actually did, especially in Belgium, and the threat it represented to US ideals. Belgium kept the public's sympathy as the Germans executed civilians, and English nurse Edith Cavell. American engineer Herbert Hoover led a private relief effort that won wide support. Compounding the Belgium atrocities were new weapons that Americans found repugnant, like poison gas and the aerial bombardment of innocent civilians as Zeppelins dropped bombs on London. Even anti-war spokesmen did not claim that Germany was innocent, and pro-German scripts were poorly received.

Randolph Bourne criticized the moralist philosophy claiming it was a justification by US intellectual and power elites, like President Wilson, for going to war unnecessarily. He argues that the push for war started with the Preparedness movement, fueled by big business. While big business would not push much further than Preparedness, benefitting the most from neutrality, the movement would eventually evolve into a war-cry, led by war-hawk intellectuals under the guise of moralism. Bourne believes elites knew full well what going to war would entail and the price in US lives it would cost. If US elites could portray the United States' role in the war as noble, they could convince the generally isolationist US public war would be acceptable.

Above all, US attitudes towards Germany focused on the U-boats (submarines), which sank RMS Lusitania in 1915 and other passenger ships without warning. That appeared to Americans as an unacceptable challenge to the US's rights as a neutral country, and as an unforgivable affront to humanity. After repeated diplomatic protests, Germany agreed to stop. But in 1917 the Germany military leadership decided that "military necessity" dictated the unrestricted use of their submarines. The Kaiser's advisors felt the US was enormously powerful economically but too weak militarily to make a difference.

Twenty years after World War I ended, 70% of Americans polled believed that US participation in the war had been a mistake.

== Declaration of war ==
=== Germany ===
On April 2, 1917, Wilson asked a special joint session of Congress to declare war on the German Empire, stating, "We have no selfish ends to serve". To make the conflict seem like a better idea, he painted the conflict idealistically, stating that the war would "make the world safe for democracy" and later that it would be a "war to end war". The United States had a moral responsibility to enter the war, Wilson proclaimed. The future of the world was being determined on the battlefield, and US national interest demanded a voice. Wilson's definition of the situation won wide acclaim, and, indeed, has shaped the US's role in world and military affairs ever since. Wilson believed that if the Central Powers won, the consequences would be bad for the United States. Germany would have dominated the continent and perhaps would gain control of the seas as well. Latin America could well have fallen under Berlin's control. The dream of spreading democracy, liberalism, and independence would have been shattered. On the other hand, if the Allies had won without help, there was a danger they would carve up the world without regard to US commercial interests. They were already planning to use government subsidies, tariff walls, and controlled markets to counter the competition posed by US businessmen. The solution was a third route, a "peace without victory", according to Wilson.

On April 6, 1917, Congress declared war. In the Senate, the resolution passed 82 to 6, with Senators Harry Lane, William J. Stone, James Vardaman, Asle Gronna, Robert M. La Follette, Sr., and George W. Norris voting against it. In the House, the declaration passed 373 to 50, with Claude Kitchin, a senior Democrat from North Carolina, notably opposing it. Another opponent was Jeannette Rankin, the first woman in Congress. Nearly all of the opposition came from the West and the Midwest.

=== Austria-Hungary ===
The United States Senate, in a 74 to 0 vote, declared war on Austria-Hungary on December 7, 1917, citing Austria-Hungary's severing of diplomatic relations with the United States, its use of unrestricted submarine warfare and its alliance with Germany. The declaration passed in the United States House of Representatives by a vote of 365 to 1. The sole dissenting ballot was cast by Meyer London, a Socialist Party of America member and New York congressman.

President Wilson also came under pressure from Senator Henry Cabot Lodge, and from former President Theodore Roosevelt, who demanded a declaration of war on the Ottoman Empire and Bulgaria, as Germany's allies. President Wilson drafted a statement to Congress in December 1917 which said "I... recommend that Congress immediately declare the United States in a state of war with Austria-Hungary, with Turkey and with Bulgaria". However, after further consultations, the decision to go to war against Germany's other allies was postponed.

== See also ==
- Causes of World War I
- Diplomatic history of World War I
- Foreign policy of the Woodrow Wilson administration
- Italian entry into World War I
- Japanese entry into World War I
- Pacifism in the United States
- United States in World War I
- United States home front during World War I

== Bibliography ==
- Ambrosius, Lloyd E. "Woodrow Wilson and George W. Bush: Historical Comparisons of Ends and Means in Their Foreign Policies," Diplomatic History, 30 (June 2006), 509–43.
- Bassett, John Spencer. Our War with Germany: A History (1919) online edition
- Brands, H.W. Theodore Roosevelt (2001)OCLC 50431515, full biography
- Clements, Kendrick A. "Woodrow Wilson and World War I," Presidential Studies Quarterly 34:1 (2004).
- Clifford, J. Garry. Citizen Soldiers: The Plattsburgh Training Camp Movement, 1913–1920 (1972)
- Cooper, John Milton. The vanity of power: American isolationism and the First World War, 1914–1917 (1969).
- Cooper, John Milton. Woodrow Wilson. A Biography (2009), Major scholarly biography.
- Costrell, Edwin. How Maine viewed the war, 1914–1917, (1940)OCLC 475605726
- Crighton, John C. Missouri and the World War, 1914–1917: a study in public opinion (University of Missouri, 1947) OCLC 831309569
- Coffman, Edward M. The War to End All Wars: The American Military Experience in World War I (1998) ISBN 0-8131-0955-8 OCLC 38842092
- Cummins, Cedric Clisten. Indiana public opinion and the World War, 1914–1917, (1945)
- Davis, Allen F. American Heroine: The Life and Legend of Jane Addams. (Oxford University Press, 1973) ISBN 0-19-501694-7 OCLC 714527
- Doenecke, Justus D. Nothing Less Than War: A New History of America's Entry into World War I (2011) 433 pages; comprehensive history ISBN 978-0-8131-3002-6 OCLC 682895305
- Esposito, David M. The Legacy of Woodrow Wilson: American War Aims in World War I. (Praeger, 1996) 159pp ISBN 0-275-95493-5 OCLC 33244422
- Finnegan, John P. Against the Specter of a Dragon: The Campaign for American Military Preparedness, 1914–1917. (1975). ISBN 0-8371-7376-0 OCLC 983933
- Floyd, M. Ryan (2013). Abandoning American Neutrality: Woodrow Wilson and the Beginning of the Great War, August 1914 – December 1915. New York: Palgrave Macmillan. ISBN 978-1-137-33411-4 OCLC 836748335
- Fordham, Benjamin O. "Revisionism reconsidered: exports and American intervention in World War I." International Organization 61#2 (2007): 277–310.
- Grubbs, Frank L. The Struggle for Labor Loyalty: Gompers, the A. F. of L., and the Pacifists, 1917–1920. 1968. OCLC 640024383
- Hannigan, Robert E. (2016). "Table of Contents: The Great War and American Foreign Policy, 1914-24". University of Pennsylvania Press. Archived from the original on July 23, 2019.
- Hodgson, Godfrey. Woodrow Wilson's Right Hand: The Life of Colonel Edward M. House. 2006. ISBN 0-300-09269-5 OCLC 61864854 335pp
- Keene, Jennifer D. "Americans Respond: Perspectives on the Global War, 1914–1917." Geschichte und Gesellschaft 40.2 (2014): 266–286. online
- Kennedy, David M. Over Here: The First World War and American Society (1982), covers politics & economics & society ISBN 0-19-502729-9 OCLC 6085939
- Kennedy, Ross A. "Preparedness," in Ross A. Kennedy ed., A Companion to Woodrow Wilson 2013. pp. 270–86 ISBN 978-1-4443-3737-2 OCLC 808244737
- Kennedy, Ross A. Woodrow Wilson, World War I, and America's Strategy for Peace and Security (2009).
- Koistinen, Paul. Mobilizing for Modern War: The Political Economy of American Warfare, 1865–1919 Lawrence: University Press of Kansas, 1997.
- Knock, Thomas J. To End All Wars: Woodrow Wilson and the Quest for a New World Order New York : Oxford University Press, 1992. ISBN 0-19-507501-3 OCLC 25317305
- Lemnitzer, Jan Martin. "Woodrow Wilson's Neutrality, the Freedom of the Seas, and the Myth of the 'Civil War Precedents'." Diplomacy & Statecraft 27.4 (2016): 615–638.
- Link, Arthur S. Woodrow Wilson and the Progressive Era, 1910–1917. 1972.
- Link, Arthur S. Wilson: The Struggle for Neutrality: 1914–1915 (1960); Wilson: Confusions and Crises: 1915–1916 (1964); Wilson: Campaigns for Progressivism and Peace: 1916–1917 (1965) all 3 volumes are online at ACLS e-books
- Link, Arthur S. Wilson the Diplomatist: A Look at His Major Foreign Policies Baltimore: Johns Hopkins Press, 1957.OCLC 475072
- Link, Arthur S. Woodrow Wilson and a Revolutionary World, 1913–1921. 1982.
- Link, Arthur S. Woodrow Wilson: Revolution, War, and Peace. Arlington Heights, IL: AHM Pub. Corp., 1979. ISBN 0-88295-798-8 OCLC 5244770
- Livermore, Seward W. Politics Is Adjourned: Woodrow Wilson and the War Congress, 1916–1918. 1966.
- McCallum, Jack. Leonard Wood: Rough Rider, Surgeon, Architect of American Imperialism. New York : New York University Press, 2006. ISBN 978-0-8147-5699-7 OCLC 60402000
- McDonald, Forrest. Insull: The Rise and Fall of a Billionaire Utility Tycoon (2004)
- May, Ernest R. The World War and American Isolation, 1914–1917 (1959) online at ACLS e-books, highly influential study
- Nash, George H. Life of Herbert Hoover: The Humanitarian, 1914–1917 (Life of Herbert Hoover, Vol. 2) (1988)
- O'Toole, Patricia. When Trumpets Call: Theodore Roosevelt after the White House. New York : Simon & Schuster, 2005. ISBN 0-684-86477-0 OCLC 56921011
- Perkins, Bradford. The Great Rapprochement: England and the United States, 1895–1914 1968.
- Peterson, H. C. Propaganda for War: The Campaign Against American Neutrality, 1914–1917. Norman, OK: University of Oklahoma Press, 1968.
- Petkov, Petko M. (1991). The United States and Bulgaria in World War I. Boulder: Eastern European Monographs. ISBN 9780880332033.
- Rothwell, V. H. British War Aims and Peace Diplomacy, 1914–1918. 1971.
- Safford, Jeffrey J. Wilsonian Maritime Diplomacy, 1913–1921. 1978.
- Smith, Daniel. The Great Departure: The United States and World War I, 1914–1920. 1965.
- Sterba, Christopher M. Good Americans: Italian and Jewish Immigrants during the First World War. 2003. 288 pp. ISBN 0-19-514754-5 OCLC 49576532
- Tuchman, Barbara W. (1985). The Zimmermann Telegram. Random House Publishing. ISBN 0-345-32425-0.
- Tucker, Robert W. Woodrow Wilson and the Great War: Reconsidering America's Neutrality, 1914–1917. 2007. ISBN 978-0-8139-2629-2
- Venzon, Anne Cipriano, ed. The United States in the First World War: An Encyclopedia New York: Garland Pub., 1995. ISBN 0-8240-7055-0 OCLC 32013365
- Ward, Robert D. "The Origin and Activities of the National Security League, 1914–1919." Mississippi Valley Historical Review 47 (1960): 51–65. online at JSTOR

=== Opponents of war ===
- Agnew, Elizabeth N. "A will to peace: Jane Addams, World War I, and 'pacifism in practice'." Peace & Change 42.1 (2017): 5-31.
- Arnett, Alex Mathews. Claude Kitchin and the Wilson War Policies. 1937. OCLC 1278853 Kitchen was an antiwar Democrat in Congress.
- Bennett, Scott H. Radical Pacifism: The War Resisters League and Gandhian Nonviolence in America, 1915–1963 (Syracuse Univ. Press, 2003).
- Chatfield, Charles. For peace and justice: pacifism in America, 1914–1941 (University of Tennessee Press, 1971).
- Early, Frances H. A World without War: How U.S. Feminists and Pacifists Resisted World War I. (Syracuse University Press, 1997) ISBN 0-8156-2764-5 OCLC 36800616 online.
- Gibbs, Christopher C. (1988). The Great Silent Majority: Missouri's Resistance to World War I. University of Missouri Press. ISBN 0-8262-0683-2. OCLC 17676727.
- Herman, Sondra. Eleven Against War: Studies in American Internationalist Thought, 1898–1921. (1969). OCLC 23333
- Hershey, Burnet. The Odyssey of Henry Ford and the Great Peace Ship (Taplinger Publishing, 1967).
- Kazal, Russell A. Becoming Old Stock: The Paradox of German-American Identity. 2004. 390, pp. ISBN 0-691-05015-5 OCLC 52509620 German Americans in Philadelphia ponder the war.
- Kazin, Michael. War Against War: The American Fight for Peace, 1914–1918 (2017).
- Kelly, Andrew. "Film as Antiwar Propaganda: Lay Down Your Arms (1914)." Peace & Change 16.1 (1991): 97-112.
- Kennedy, Kathleen. "Declaring war on war: Gender and the American socialist attack on militarism, 1914–1918." Journal of Women's History 7.2 (1995): 27-51. excerpt
- McKillen, Elizabeth. "Pacifist Brawn and Silk-Stocking Militarism: Labor, Gender, and Antiwar Politics, 1914–1918." Peace & Change 33.3 (2008): 388-425.
- Luebke, Frederick C. Bonds of Loyalty: German-Americans and World War I. Dekalb : Northern Illinois University Press, 1974. ISBN 0-87580-045-9 OCLC 865969
- Steigerwald, Alison Rebecca. "Women United Against War: American Female Peace Activists' Work During the First World War, 1914–1917' (PhD dissertation, The University of Iowa, 2020) online
- Unger, Nancy C. Fighting Bob La Follette: The Righteous Reformer (University of North Carolina Press, 2000). ISBN 0-8078-2545-X
- Wachtell, Cynthia. War No More: The Antiwar Impulse in American Literature, 1861–1914 (Louisiana State University Press, 2010).
- Witcover, Jules. Sabotage at Black Tom: Imperial Germany's Secret War in America. Chapel Hill, NC: Algonquin Books of Chapel Hill, 1989. ISBN 0-912697-98-9 OCLC 18379558
- Zeiger, Susan. "The schoolhouse vs. the armory: US teachers and the campaign against militarism in the schools, 1914–1918." Journal of Women's History 15.2 (2003): 150-179. online

=== Historiography ===
- Cornelissen, Christoph, and Arndt Weinrich, eds. Writing the Great War – The Historiography of World War I from 1918 to the Present (2020) free download; full coverage for major countries.
- Doenecke, Justus D. "Neutrality Policy and the Decision for War." in Ross Kennedy ed., A Companion to Woodrow Wilson (2013) pp. 243–69 Online; covers the historiography
- Higham, Robin and Dennis E. Showalter, eds. Researching World War I: A Handbook. 2003. ISBN 0-313-28850-X OCLC 51922814, 475pp; highly detailed historiography,
- Keene, Jennifer D. "Remembering the "Forgotten War": American Historiography on World War I." Historian 78#3 (2016): 439–468. https://doi.org/10.1111/hisn.12245
- Keene, Jennifer D. "Finding a place for World War I in American history. 1914 –2018." online
- Keene, Jennifer D. "Finding a Place for World War I in American History: 1914-2018." In Writing the Great War: The Historiography of World War I from 1918 to the Present, edited by Christoph Cornelissen and Arndt Weinrich, (Berghahn Books, 2020) pp.449–487.

== Primary sources ==
- Committee on Public Information. How the war came to America (1917) online 840pp
- The Papers of Woodrow Wilson edited by Arthur S. Link complete in 69 vol, at major academic libraries. Annotated edition of all of WW's letters, speeches and writings plus many letters written to him
- Wilson, Woodrow. Why We Are at War (1917) six war messages to Congress, Jan- April 1917
- Stark, Matthew J. "Wilson and the United States Entry into the Great War" OAH Magazine of History (2002) 17#1 pp. 40–47 lesson plan and primary sources for school projects online
