= The Little Grey Mother Who Waits All Alone (March Ballad) =

1915 American song

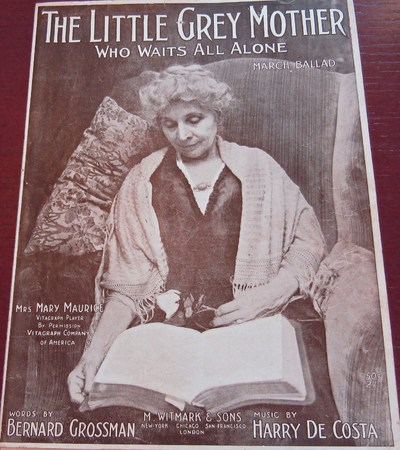

Song
- Released: 1915
- Label: M. Witmark & Sons
- Composer(s): Harry De Costa
- Lyricist(s): Bernard Grossman

"The Little Grey Mother Who Waits All Alone (March Ballad)" is a World War I era song released in 1915. Bernard Grossman wrote the lyrics. Harry De Costa composed the music. The song was published by M. Witmark & Sons of New York, New York. Vitagraph actress Mary Maurice is featured on the cover, reading a book and holding a rose. It was written for voice and piano.

The sheet music can be found at Pritzker Military Museum & Library.

The song tells the story of a mother of a soldier who is grieving her son's death. The chorus is as follows:

There's a little grey mother who waits all alone
In a chill, dreary spot that was once Home Sweet Home.
When Gen'rals are saying, "This fight must be won!"
She's sadly praying, "Please send back my son!"
When the battle are over and peace once more reigns
When the cost and lost will be known
Will kings give a thought to the heartaches they've brought
To that little grey mother alone?
