= Womanhood, the Glory of the Nation =

1917 film by J. Stuart Blackton and William P. S. Earle

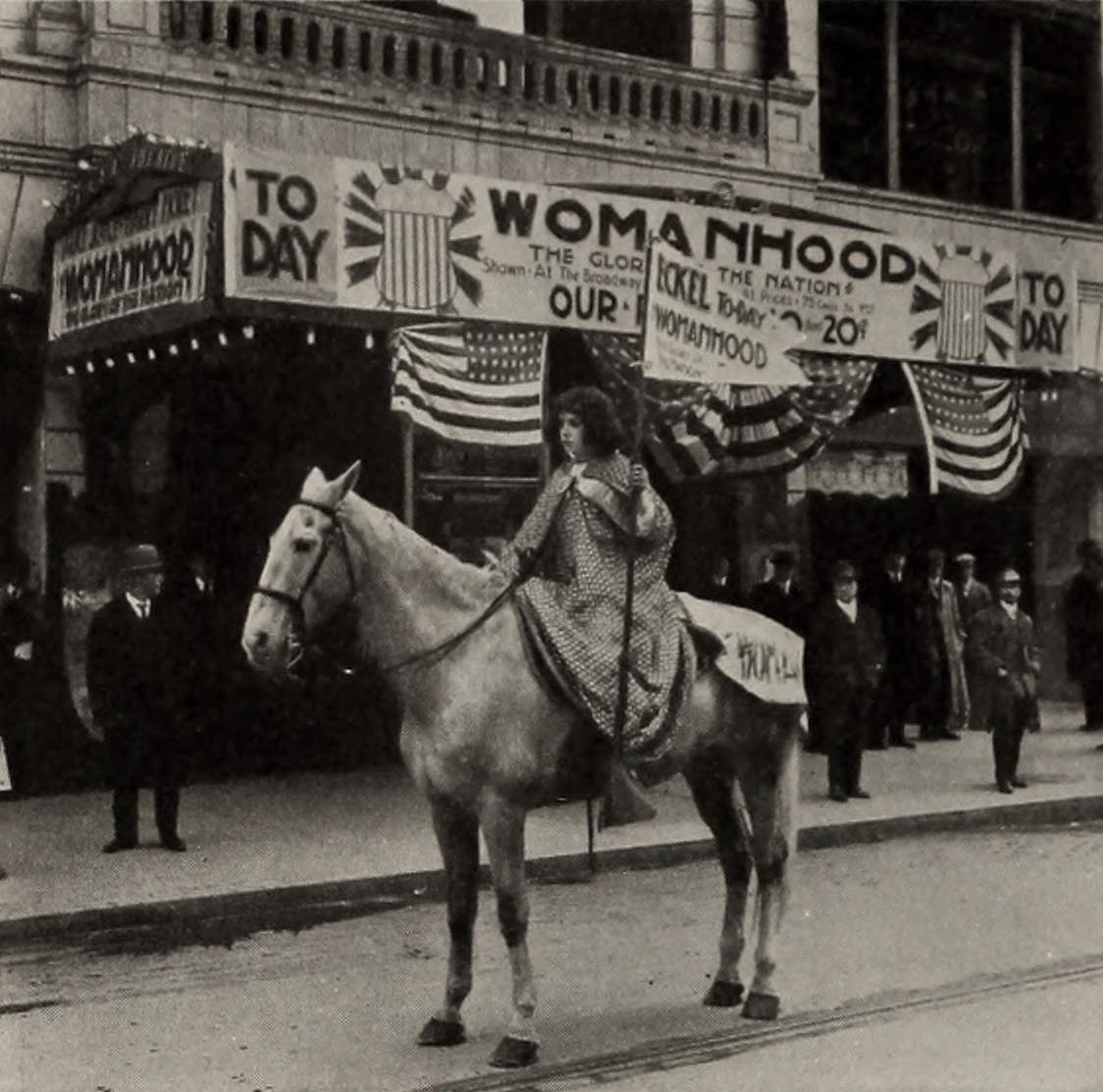
- Outside a cinema in New York showing the film
- Directed by: J. Stuart Blackton; William P. S. Earle
- Written by: Helmer W. Bergman; J. Stuart Blackton; Cyrus Townsend Brady
- Produced by: J. Stuart Blackton
- Starring: Alice Joyce; Harry T. Morey
- Cinematography: Clark R. Nickerson
- Edited by: Albert J. Ohlson
- Production company: Vitagraph
- Distributed by: V-L-S-E, Inc.
- Release date: April 9, 1917 (US)
- Running time: 7 reels
- Country: United States
- Language: English

Womanhood, the Glory of the Nation is a 1917 American lost silent drama film directed by J. Stuart Blackton and William P. S. Earle, and written by Blackton, Helmer W. Bergman, and Cyrus Townsend Brady. It is a sequel to the 1915 movie The Battle Cry of Peace. The film stars Alice Joyce and Harry T. Morey. It is a lost film.

== Plot ==
Traveling in Europe, Mary Ward fascinates Count Darius of Ruritania who asks her in marriage. Promising him an answer, Mary returns to the United States via Manila. Passing through the Philippines, he learns that New York was unexpectedly attacked by Ruritania and, in the course of the attack, his mother and sister were killed. Paul Strong, an American politician, takes Mary back to her homeland and in New York opens a campaign to reorganize the army. Paul's sister Jane, who shows up at the rallies impersonating Joan of Arc to inflame the souls of the patriots, is killed. Mary uses her fascination with Dario, whose father is in charge of the forces of Ruritania, to steal military secrets from him. Count Dario is shot by his father, The Marshal Prince Dario for disobedience of orders. Among wounded veterans - like Philip, Mary's brother, blind from the war -, espionage and battles, the United States manages to win the war led by Paul to victory and defeat the Rurite army. He and Mary, hugging each other in New York, now happily observe a once again prosperous and peaceful city.

== Cast list ==
- Alice Joyce as Mary Ward
- Harry T. Morey as Paul Strong
- Naomi Childers as Jane Strong
- Joseph Kilgour as Marshal Prince Dario
- Walter McGrail as Count Dario
- Mary Maurice as Julia Strong
- James Morrison as Philip Ward
- Peggy Hyland as Alice Renfrow
- Templar Saxe as Baron Reyva
- Bobby Connolly as the little boy
- Edward Elkas as Ortos
- Bernard Siegel as Carl, the spy
- John Costello as Prime minister
- Theodore Roosevelt as Himself

== See also ==
- The Battle Cry of Peace
- Invasion literature
