= Mary Maurice =

American actress

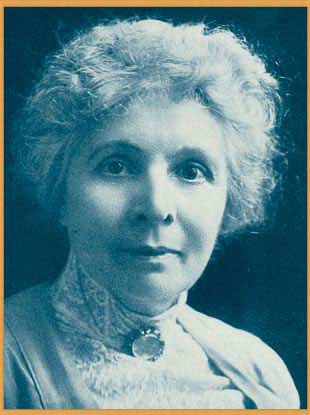
- Maurice in 1916
- Born: November 15, 1844; Morristown, Ohio, U.S.
- Died: April 30, 1918 (aged 73); Port Carbon, Pennsylvania, U.S.
- Occupation: Actress
- Years active: 1909–1918

Mary Maurice (November 15, 1844 – April 30, 1918) was an American actress who appeared in 139 films between 1909 and 1918.

== Biography ==
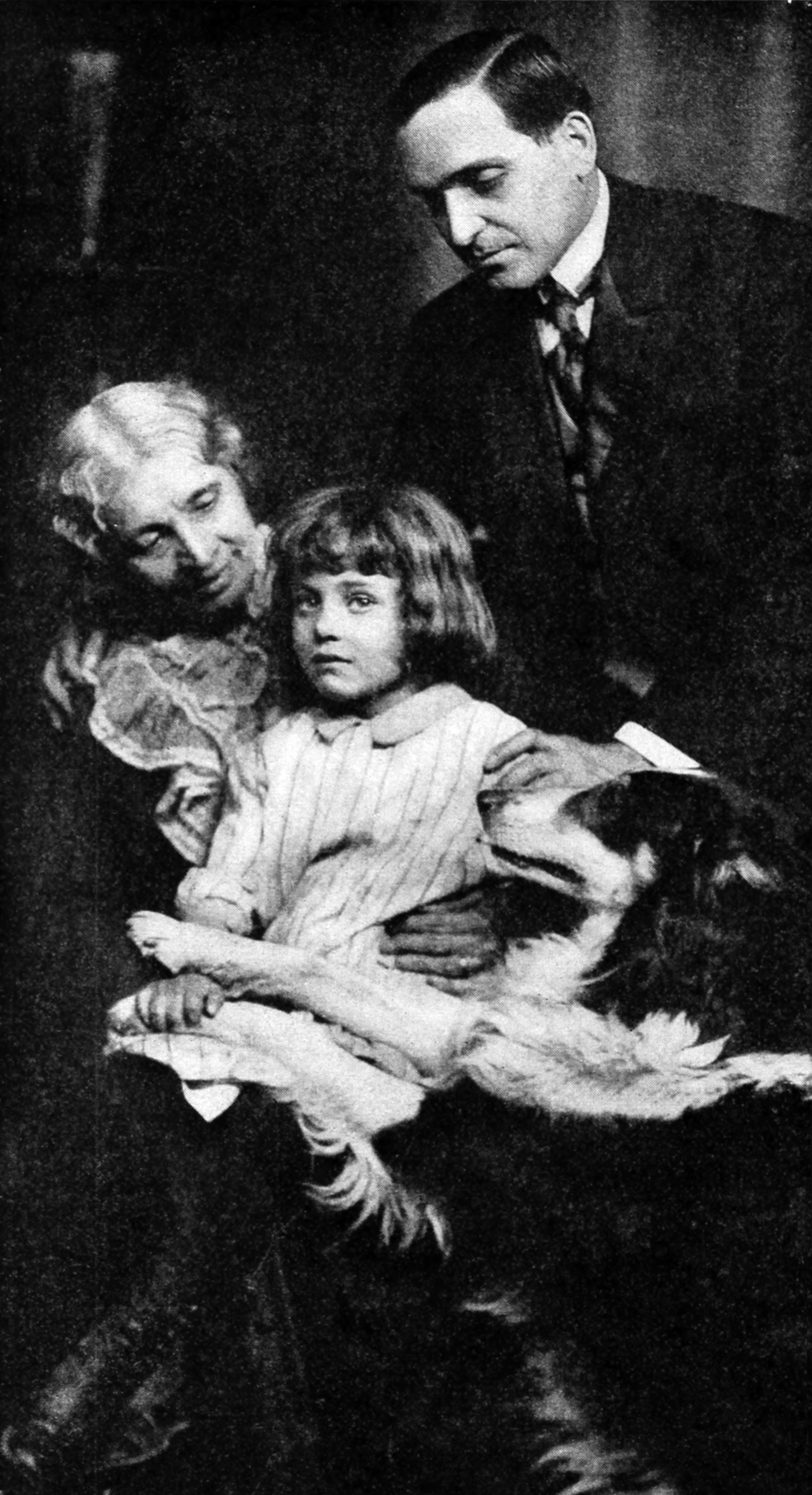
Maurice with Helene Costello (child), Earle Williams, and the "Vitagraph Dog" Jean in The Church Across the Way, 1912

Maurice was born on November 15, 1844, in Morristown, Ohio. Originally a schoolteacher, during her long stage career, she appeared in support of Edwin Booth, Lawrence Barrett, Joseph Jefferson, and Helena Modjeska; her last engagement was with Robert B. Mantell. She did not mind admitting that she was past sixty, but she had the heart of youth and was the best-loved of screen mothers. In a 1914 interview, she reflected on the great technological change ushered in by motion pictures, saying that it "[seemed] to be the most wonderful thing in the world that I, at my age, should be at the vanguard of my profession." She played in both The Goddess and The Battle Cry of Peace.

She, Russell Bassett, Sarah Bernhardt, W. Chrystie Miller, Ruby Lafayette, Kate Meek (b. 1838), the veteran character actor Matt B. Snyder and Harold Lloyd regular Anna Townsend were the eight oldest people working in film during the 1910s. She stayed with Vitagraph as a "mother lady".

She died April 30, 1918, in Port Carbon, Pennsylvania at the age of 73.

== Selected filmography ==
- The Cross-Roads (1912)
- One Can't Always Tell (1913)
- The Battle Cry of Peace (1915)
- The Man Who Couldn't Beat God (1915)
- The Mainspring (1916)
- The Price of Fame (1916)
- Whom the Gods Destroy (1916)
- Black Friday (1916)
- Womanhood, the Glory of the Nation (1917)
- Over the Top (1918)
- The Woman Between Friends (1918)
