= The Battle Cry of Peace =

1915 film

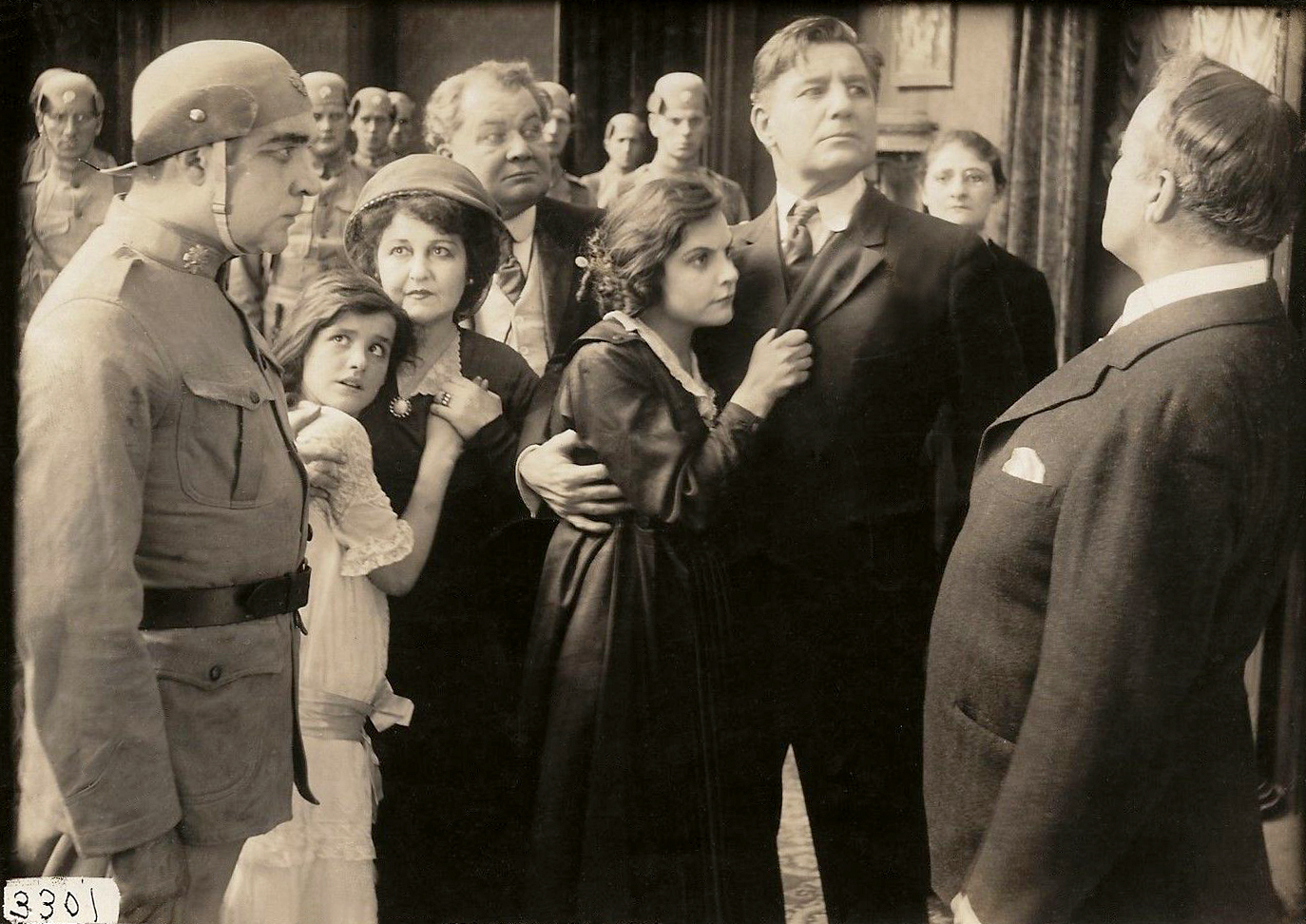
- John Harrison (Charles Richman) and Virginia Vandergriff (Norma Talmadge) face enemy leader Emanon (L. Rogers Lytton) while Virginia's mother and sister fearfully view an enemy soldier in The Battle Cry of Peace.
- Directed by: Wilfrid North; J. Stuart Blackton
- Written by: J. Stuart Blackton (scenario)
- Based on: Defenseless America by Hudson Maxim
- Produced by: J. Stuart Blackton
- Cinematography: Leonard Smith; Arthur T. Quinn
- Music by: S. L. Rothapfel; S. M. Berg; Ivan Rudisill
- Production company: Vitagraph Company of America
- Distributed by: V-L-S-E, Incorporated
- Release date: August 6, 1915 (New York City)
- Running time: 90 minutes
- Country: United States
- Language: Silent (English intertitles)

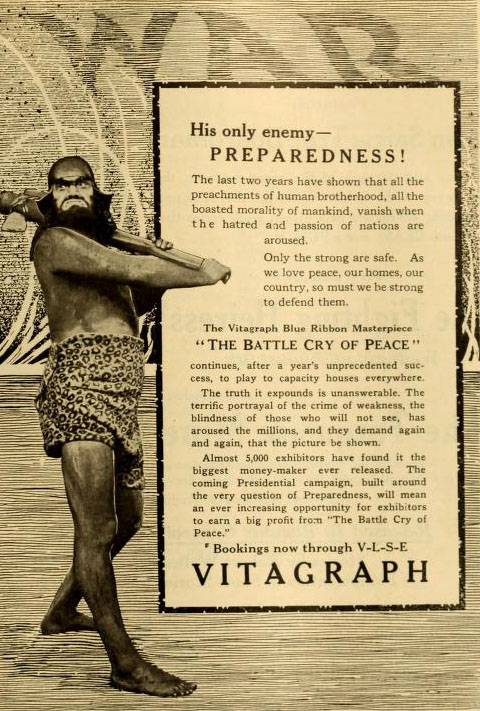
Advertisement in The Moving Picture World (1916)

The Battle Cry of Peace is a 1915 American silent war film directed by Wilfrid North and J. Stuart Blackton, one of the founders of Vitagraph Company of America who also wrote the scenario. The film is based on the book Defenseless America, by Hudson Maxim, and was distributed by V-L-S-E, Incorporated. The film stars Charles Richman, L. Rogers Lytton, and James W. Morrison.

Alternate titles for this film were A Call to Arms and The Battle Cry of War. In the UK, the film was called An American Home. A sequel followed in 1917, Womanhood, the Glory of the Nation.

== Plot ==
In a war-torn world, enemy agents under the leadership of "Emanon" conspire with pacifists to keep the American defense appropriations down at a time when forces of the enemy are preparing to invade. The invasion comes, and New York, Washington, and other American cities are devastated and the enemies take over the country.

== Cast ==
- Charles Richman as John Harrison
- L. Rogers Lytton as Mr. Emanon
- James W. Morrison as Charley Harrison
- Mary Maurice as Mrs. Harrison
- Louise Beaudet as Mrs. Vandergriff
- Harold Hubert as John Vandergriff
- Jack Crawford as Poet Scout
- Charles Kent as The Master
- Julia Swayne Gordon as Magdalen
- Belle Bruce as Alice Harrison
- Norma Talmadge as Virginia Vandergriff
- Lucille Hammill as Dorothy Vandergriff
- Evart Overton as Vandergriff's son
- George Stevens as Butler
- Thais Lawton as Columbia
- Lionel Braham as The War Monster
- William J. Ferguson as Abraham Lincoln
- Paul Scardon as Ulysses S. Grant
- Joseph Kilgour as George Washington

== Book version ==
In the same year, J. Stuart Blackton published the book version of The Battle Cry of Peace with pictures from the film. The book has nothing to do with Defenseless America by Hudson Maxim.

== Significance ==
Upon its release, the film generated a controversy rivaling that of The Birth of a Nation because it was considered to be militaristic propaganda. Producer Stuart Blackton believed that the US should join the Allies involved in World War I overseas, and that was why he made the film. Former President Theodore Roosevelt was one of the film's staunchest supporters, and he persuaded Gen. Leonard Wood to lend Blackton an entire regiment of Marines to use as extras.

== Production ==
The film was released by VLSE Incorporated [A Blue Ribbon Feature] and premiered in New York on August 6, 1915, at the Vitagraph Theater (formerly the Criterion Theater). The film is also known under the title A Call to Arms Against War or The Battle Cry of War. The copyright, requested by The Vitagraph Co. of America, was registered on November 10, 1915, under number LP6935.

In the UK, the film was released as An American Home. In 1917, a sequel was made to Womanhood, the Glory of the Nation which was directed by William P. S. Earle alongside James Stuart Blackton. In Italy, it was initially censored in August 1916, but managed to obtain clearance for distribution in February 1917; it was distributed by the Lombard Monopoly.

In 1917, when the United States entered the war, the film was reissued in a modified version under the title The Battle Cry of War.

== Censorship ==
Like many American films of the time, The Battle Cry of Peace was subject to cuts by city and state film censorship boards. For example, the Pennsylvania State Board of Censors required a series of cuts which included the climatic scene in the third act where a mother murders her own daughters to prevent them from falling into the hands of officers of a foreign enemy. The Pitt Theatre in Pittsburgh, rather than let the audience miss the lesson of the film, hired three young women to act out the excised scene, which the Board could not prevent as it could not regulate stage productions.

== Preservation ==
The majority of the film is now considered lost. The Cinemateket-Svenska Filminstitutet possesses one reel. Fragments of footage of battle scenes survive and are housed at the George Eastman House.

== See also ==
- Invasion literature
- List of incomplete or partially lost films
- Womanhood, the Glory of the Nation (1917)
