= List of American films of 1923 =

American films released in 1923

More than 590 American feature films were released in 1923.

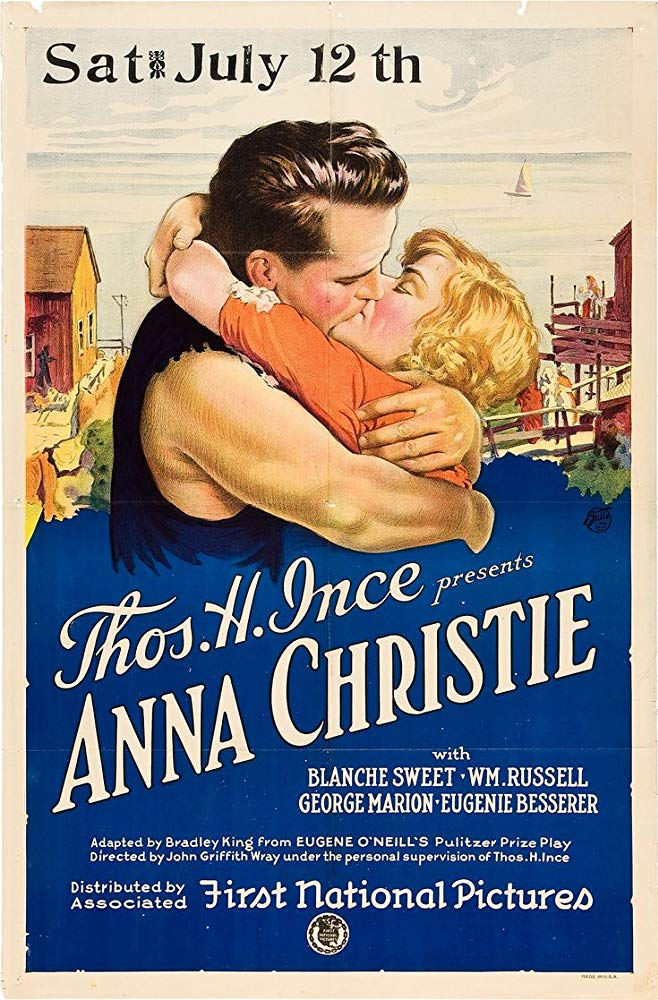
Anna Christie starring Blanche Sweet.

== A ==
Title	Director	Cast	Genre	Notes
Abysmal Brute	Hobart Henley	Reginald Denny, Mabel Julienne Scott	Sports	Universal
The Acquittal	Clarence Brown	Claire Windsor, Norman Kerry, Barbara Bedford	Mystery	Universal
Adam and Eva	Robert G. Vignola	Marion Davies, T. Roy Barnes, Luella Gear	Comedy	Paramount
Adam's Rib	Cecil B. DeMille	Milton Sills, Elliott Dexter, Anna Q. Nilsson	Drama	Paramount
The Age of Desire	Frank Borzage	Josef Swickard, William Collier Jr., Mary Philbin	Drama	First National
Alias the Night Wind	Joseph Franz	William Russell, Wade Boteler	Mystery	Fox Film
Alice Adams	Rowland V. Lee	Florence Vidor, Claude Gillingwater, Gertrude Astor	Drama	Associated Exhibitors
All the Brothers Were Valiant	Irvin Willat	Lon Chaney, Malcolm McGregor, Billie Dove	Adventure	Metro
Anna Christie	John Griffith Wray	Blanche Sweet, William Russell	Drama	First National
The Apache Dancer	Charles R. Seeling	George Larkin, Ollie Kirby, Julian Rivero	Drama	Independent
April Showers	Tom Forman	Colleen Moore, Kenneth Harlan, Ruth Clifford	Romance	Preferred
The Acquittal	Clarence Brown	Claire Windsor, Norman Kerry, Barbara Bedford	Mystery	Universal
Are You a Failure?	Tom Forman	Madge Bellamy, Lloyd Hughes, Tom Santschi	Comedy	Preferred
Around the World in Eighteen Days	B. Reeves Eason, Robert F. Hill	William Desmond, Laura La Plante	Adventure	Universal
As a Man Lives	J. Searle Dawley	Robert Frazer, Gladys Hulette, Frank Losee	Drama	Independent
Ashes of Vengeance	Frank Lloyd	Norma Talmadge, Conway Tearle, Wallace Beery	Drama	First National
At Devil's Gorge	Ashton Dearholt	Edmund Cobb, Helene Rosson, Wilbur McGaugh	Western	Independent

== B ==
Title	Director	Cast	Genre	Notes
Backbone	Edward Sloman	Edith Roberts, Alfred Lunt	Drama	Goldwyn
The Bad Man	Edwin Carewe	Holbrook Blinn, Jack Mulhall, Walter McGrail	Western	First National
Bag and Baggage	Finis Fox	Gloria Grey, Carmelita Geraghty	Romantic comedy	Selznick
The Barefoot Boy	David Kirkland	John Bowers, Marjorie Daw, Sylvia Breamer	Drama	Columbia
Bavu	Stuart Paton	Wallace Beery, Estelle Taylor, Forrest Stanley	Drama	Universal
Bell Boy 13	William A. Seiter	Douglas MacLean, John Steppling	Comedy	First National
Big Brother	Allan Dwan	Tom Moore, Edith Roberts	Crime drama	Paramount
Big Dan	William A. Wellman	Charles Jones, Marian Nixon	Comedy	Universal
The Bishop of the Ozarks	Finis Fox	Milford W. Howard, Derelys Perdue	Drama	FBO
The Bolted Door	William Worthington	Frank Mayo, Phyllis Haver	Drama	Universal
Boston Blackie	Scott R. Dunlap	William Russell, Eva Novak	Crime	Fox Film
Boy of Mine	William Beaudine	Ben Alexander, Rockliffe Fellowes, Henry B. Walthall	Family drama	First National
Black Oxen	Frank Lloyd	Corinne Griffith, Conway Tearle	Drama	First National
Blinky	Edward Sedgwick	Hoot Gibson, Esther Ralston	Comedy western	Universal
Blow Your Own Horn	James W. Horne	Warner Baxter, Ralph Lewis	Comedy	FBO
Bluebeard's 8th Wife	Sam Wood	Gloria Swanson, Huntley Gordon	Romantic comedy	Paramount
Boy of Mine	William Beaudine	Rockliffe Fellowes, Irene Rich	Drama	First National
Brass	Sidney Franklin	Monte Blue, Marie Prevost	Romance	Warner Bros.
The Brass Bottle	Maurice Tourneur	Harry Myers, Ernest Torrence	Comedy	First National
Brass Commandments	Lynn Reynolds	William Farnum, Wanda Hawley	Western	Fox Film
Breaking Into Society	Hunt Stromberg	Bull Montana, Florence Gilbert	Comedy	FBO
Bright Lights of Broadway	Webster Campbell	Doris Kenyon, Lowell Sherman	Drama	Independent
The Bright Shawl	John S. Robertson	Richard Barthelmess, Dorothy Gish, Mary Astor	Drama	First National
The Broad Road	Edmund Mortimer	Richard Travers, May Allison	Drama	First National
Broadway Broke	J. Searle Dawley	Mary Carr, Percy Marmont	Drama	Selznick
Broadway Gold	Edward Dillon	Elaine Hammerstein, Elliott Dexter	Drama	Independent
Broken Hearts of Broadway	Irving Cummings	Colleen Moore, Johnnie Walker, Alice Lake	Drama	Selznick
The Broken Violin	John Francis Dillon	Dorothy Mackaill, Reed Howes, Zena Keefe	Drama	Independent
The Broken Wing	Tom Forman	Kenneth Harlan, Miriam Cooper	Comedy	Preferred
Bucking the Barrier	Colin Campbell	Dustin Farnum, Arline Pretty	Drama	Fox Film
Burning Words	Stuart Paton	Laura La Plante, Harold Goodwin	Action	Universal
The Buster	Colin Campbell	Dustin Farnum, Francis McDonald	Western	Fox Film

== C ==
Title	Director	Cast	Genre	Notes
The Call of the Canyon	Victor Fleming	Richard Dix, Lois Wilson	Western	Paramount
The Call of the Wild	Fred Jackman	Jack Mulhall, Sidney D'Albrook	Adventure	Pathé Exchange
Cameo Kirby	John Ford	John Gilbert, Gertrude Olmstead	Drama	Fox Film
Can a Woman Love Twice?	James W. Horne	Ethel Clayton, Kate Lester	Drama	FBO
Canyon of the Fools	Val Paul	Harry Carey, Marguerite Clayton	Western	FBO
Cause for Divorce	Hugh Dierker	Fritzi Brunette, Helen Lynch, Pat O'Malley	Drama	Selznick
A Chapter in Her Life	Lois Weber	Claude Gillingwater, Jacqueline Gadsden	Drama	Universal
Chastity	Victor Schertzinger	Katherine MacDonald, Huntley Gordon	Drama	First National
The Cheat	George Fitzmaurice	Pola Negri, Jack Holt	Drama	Paramount
Children of Dust	Frank Borzage	Johnnie Walker, Pauline Garon	Drama	First National
Children of Jazz	Jerome Storm	Theodore Kosloff, Ricardo Cortez, Eileen Percy	Comedy	Paramount
The Christian	Maurice Tourneur	Richard Dix, Mae Busch, Gareth Hughes	Drama	Goldwyn
Circus Days	Eddie Cline	Jackie Coogan, Claire McDowell	Comedy	First National
The Clean Up	William Parke	Herbert Rawlinson, Claire Adams	Drama	Universal
A Clouded Name	Austin O. Huhn	Norma Shearer, Gladden James	Drama	Independent
The Common Law	George Archainbaud	Corinne Griffith, Conway Tearle	Drama	Selznick
Cordelia the Magnificent	George Archainbaud	Clara Kimball Young, Huntley Gordon	Mystery	Metro
Counterfeit Love	Ralph Ince	Joe King, Marian Swayne, Jack Richardson	Drama	Independent
The Country Kid	William Beaudine	Wesley Barry, Spec O'Donnell, Bruce Guerin	Comedy drama	Warner Bros.
The Courtship of Miles Standish	Frederic Sullivan	Charles Ray, Enid Bennett, Sam De Grasse	Historical	Associated Exhibitors
The Covered Wagon	James Cruze	J. Warren Kerrigan, Lois Wilson, Alan Hale	Western	Paramount
Crashin' Thru	Val Paul	Harry Carey, Cullen Landis	Western	FBO
The Cricket on the Hearth	Lorimer Johnston	Josef Swickard, Fritzi Ridgeway, Virginia Brown Faire	Comedy	Selznick
Crinoline and Romance	Harry Beaumont	Viola Dana, Claude Gillingwater, John Bowers	Comedy	Metro
Crooked Alley	Robert F. Hill	Thomas Carrigan, Laura La Plante	Crime	Universal
Crossed Wires	King Baggot	Gladys Walton, Eddie Gribbon	Crime	Universal
Cupid's Fireman	William A. Wellman	Buck Jones, Marian Nixon	Adventure	Fox Film
The Custard Cup	Herbert Brenon	Mary Carr, Ben Lyon	Drama	Fox Film

== D ==
Title	Director	Cast	Genre	Notes
Daddy	E. Mason Hopper	Jackie Coogan, Josie Sedgwick	Drama	First National
The Dancer of the Nile	William P. S. Earle	Carmel Myers, Sam De Grasse	Drama	FBO
Danger Ahead	William K. Howard	Richard Talmadge, Helene Rosson, J.P. Lockney	Crime	Independent
The Dangerous Age	John M. Stahl	Lewis Stone, Edith Roberts, Ruth Clifford	Drama	First National
The Dangerous Maid	Victor Heerman	Constance Talmadge, Conway Tearle, Charles K. Gerrard	Historical comedy	First National
Dangerous Trails	Alan James	Irene Rich, Tully Marshall, Noah Beery	Western	Independent
The Daring Years	Kenneth Webb	Mildred Harris, Charles Emmett Mack, Clara Bow	Melodrama	Independent
Dark Secrets	Victor Fleming	Dorothy Dalton, Robert Ellis	Drama	Paramount
The Darling of New York	King Baggot	Sheldon Lewis, Gladys Brockwell	Comedy	Universal
Daughters of the Rich	Louis J. Gasnier	Miriam Cooper, Gaston Glass	Drama	Preferred
The Day of Faith	Tod Browning	Eleanor Boardman, Tyrone Power Sr.	Drama	Goldwyn
Daytime Wives	Emile Chautard	Wyndham Standing, Grace Darmond	Drama	FBO
Dead Game	Edward Sedgwick	Hoot Gibson, Robert McKim	Western	Universal
Defying Destiny	Louis Chaudet	Monte Blue, Irene Rich	Drama	Selznick
Desert Driven	Val Paul	Harry Carey, Marguerite Clayton	Western	FBO
Desert Rider	Robert N. Bradbury	Jack Hoxie, Frank Rice, Evelyn Nelson	Western	Independent
Desire	Rowland V. Lee	Marguerite De La Motte, John Bowers, Estelle Taylor	Drama	Metro
The Destroying Angel	W. S. Van Dyke	Leah Baird, John Bowers	Romantic comedy	Independent
Divorce	Chester Bennett	Jane Novak, John Bowers	Drama	FBO
Does It Pay?	Charles Horan	Hope Hampton, Robert T. Haines	Drama	Fox Film
Dollar Devils	Victor Schertzinger	Eva Novak, Cullen Landis	Drama	Hodkinson
Don Quickshot of the Rio Grande	George Marshall	Jack Hoxie, William Steele	Western	Universal
Don't Call It Love	William C. de Mille	Agnes Ayres, Jack Holt, Nita Naldi	Comedy	Paramount
Don't Marry for Money	Clarence Brown	House Peters, Rubye De Remer	Drama	Independent
Double Dealing	Henry Lehrman	Hoot Gibson, Helen Ferguson, Betty Francisco	Comedy	Universal
Drifting	Tod Browning	Priscilla Dean, Matt Moore	Drama	Universal
Driven	Charles Brabin	Emily Fitzroy, Burr McIntosh	Romance	Universal
The Drivin' Fool	Robert Thornby	Wally Van, Alec B. Francis, Patsy Ruth Miller	Action	Hodkinson
The Drug Traffic	Irving Cummings	Robert Walker, Gladys Brockwell, Barbara Tennant	Crime	Independent
Drums of Fate	Charles Maigne	Mary Miles Minter, George Fawcett	Drama	Paramount
The Drums of Jeopardy	Edward Dillon	Elaine Hammerstein, Wallace Beery, Jack Mulhall	Mystery	Independent
Dulcy	Sidney Franklin	Constance Talmadge, Claude Gillingwater	Comedy	First National

== E ==
Title	Director	Cast	Genre	Notes
The Eagle's Feather	Edward Sloman	James Kirkwood, Mary Alden	Western	Metro Pictures
East Side – West Side	Irving Cummings	Kenneth Harlan, Eileen Percy	Drama	Independent
The Eleventh Hour	Bernard J. Durning	Shirley Mason, Buck Jones	Action	Fox Film
The Empty Cradle	Burton L. King	Mary Alden, Harry T. Morey, Mickey Bennett	Drama	Independent
Enemies of Women	Alan Crosland	Alma Rubens, Lionel Barrymore, Gareth Hughes	Romance	Goldwyn
The Eternal City	George Fitzmaurice	Lionel Barrymore, Bert Lytell, Barbara La Marr	Drama	First National
The Eternal Struggle	Reginald Barker	Renée Adorée, Earle Williams, Barbara La Marr	Drama	Metro
The Eternal Three	Marshall Neilan	Hobart Bosworth, Claire Windsor, Bessie Love	Drama	Goldwyn
Eyes of the Forest	Lambert Hillyer	Tom Mix, Pauline Starke	Western	Fox Film
The Exciters	Maurice S. Campbell	Bebe Daniels, Antonio Moreno	Romance	Paramount
The Exiles	Edmund Mortimer	John Gilbert, John Webb Dillion	Drama	Fox Film
The Extra Girl	F. Richard Jones	Mabel Normand, Ralph Graves	Comedy	Pathé Exchange

== F ==
Title	Director	Cast	Genre	Notes
The Face on the Bar-Room Floor	John Ford	Henry B. Walthall, Ruth Clifford	Drama	Fox Film
The Fair Cheat	Burton L. King	Edmund Breese, Wilfred Lytell, Dorothy Mackaill	Comedy	FBO
The Famous Mrs. Fair	Fred Niblo	Myrtle Stedman, Huntley Gordon, Marguerite De La Motte	Drama	Metro
Fashion Row	Robert Z. Leonard	Mae Murray, Earle Foxe	Drama	Tiffany
Fashionable Fakers	William Worthington	Johnnie Walker, J. Farrell MacDonald	Comedy	FBO
The Fighting Blade	John S. Robertson	Richard Barthelmess, Dorothy Mackaill	Historical	First National
The First Degree	Edward Sedgwick	Frank Mayo, Sylvia Breamer	Drama	Universal
The Flame of Life	Hobart Henley	Priscilla Dean, Kathryn McGuire, Wallace Beery	Drama	Universal
Flaming Youth	John Francis Dillon	Colleen Moore, Milton Sills, Elliott Dexter	Drama	First National
The Flying Dutchman	Lloyd B. Carleton	Lawson Butt, Ella Hall	Romance	FBO
The Fog	Paul Powell	Mildred Harris, Louise Fazenda	Drama	Metro
Fog Bound	Irvin Willat	Dorothy Dalton, David Powell, Martha Mansfield	Drama	Paramount
Fools and Riches	Herbert Blaché	Herbert Rawlinson, Katherine Perry	Drama	Universal
The Footlight Ranger	Scott R. Dunlap	Buck Jones, Fritzi Brunette	Western	Fox Film
Forgive and Forget	Howard M. Mitchell	Estelle Taylor, Pauline Garon	Mystery	Columbia
The Fourth Musketeer	William K. Howard	Johnnie Walker, Eileen Percy, Eddie Gribbon	Drama	FBO
The French Doll	Robert Z. Leonard	Mae Murray, Orville Caldwell	Drama	Tiffany
A Friendly Husband	John G. Blystone	Lupino Lane, Alberta Vaughn, Eva Thatcher	Comedy	Fox Film
Fury	Henry King	Richard Barthelmess, Tyrone Power Sr.	Adventure	First National

== G ==
Title	Director	Cast	Genre	Notes
Gallopin' Through	Robert N. Bradbury	Jack Hoxie, Priscilla Bonner	Western	Independent
Garrison's Finish	Arthur Rosson	Madge Bellamy, Jack Pickford, Ethel Grey Terry	Sports drama	Independent
Gentle Julia	Rowland V. Lee	Bessie Love, Harold Goodwin	Romance	Fox Film
The Gentleman from America	Edward Sedgwick	Hoot Gibson, Louise Lorraine, Carmen Phillips	Comedy–Western	Universal
A Gentleman of Leisure	Joseph Henabery	Jack Holt, Sigrid Holmquist	Comedy	Paramount
The Ghost Patrol	Nat Ross	Ralph Graves, Bessie Love	Drama	Universal
Gimme	Rupert Hughes	Helene Chadwick, Gaston Glass	Comedy	Goldwyn
The Girl I Loved	Joe De Grasse	Charles Ray, Patsy Ruth Miller	Drama	United Artists
The Glimpses of the Moon	Allan Dwan	Bebe Daniels, David Powell, Nita Naldi	Drama	Paramount
Going Up	Lloyd Ingraham	Douglas MacLean, Edna Murphy, Francis McDonald	Comedy	Independent
The Girl of the Golden West	Edwin Carewe	Sylvia Breamer, Russell Simpson	Western	First National
The Girl Who Came Back	Tom Forman	Miriam Cooper, Gaston Glass, Kenneth Harlan	Drama	Independent
Girl from the West	Wallace MacDonald	Jack Richardson, Juanita Hansen, A. Edward Sutherland	Western	Independent
The Gold Diggers	Harry Beaumont	Hope Hampton, Wyndham Standing, Louise Fazenda	Comedy	Warner Bros.
Goodbye Girls	Jerome Storm	William Russell, Carmel Myers	Comedy	Fox Film
Gossip	King Baggot	Gladys Walton, Ramsey Wallace	Drama	Universal
The Go-Getter	Edward H. Griffith	T. Roy Barnes, Seena Owen	Comedy	Paramount
The Grail	Colin Campbell	Dustin Farnum, Peggy Shaw	Western	Fox Film
The Greatest Menace	Albert S. Rogell	Ann Little, Wilfred Lucas, Robert Gordon	Crime	Independent
The Gunfighter	Lynn Reynolds	William Farnum, Doris May	Western	Fox Film
The Governor's Lady	Harry Millarde	Jane Grey, Anna Luther	Drama	Fox Film
The Green Goddess	Sidney Olcott	George Arliss, Alice Joyce	Adventure	Goldwyn
The Grub Stake	Nell Shipman	Nell Shipman, Alfred Allen, Hugh Thompson	Western	Independent
Grumpy	William C. deMille	Theodore Roberts, May McAvoy, Conrad Nagel	Drama	Paramount

== H ==
Title	Director	Cast	Genre	Notes
Haldane of the Secret Service	Harry Houdini	Harry Houdini, Gladys Leslie	Adventure	FBO
Hearts Aflame	Reginald Barker	Frank Keenan, Anna Q. Nilsson	Drama	Metro
The Heart Raider	Wesley Ruggles	Agnes Ayres, Mahlon Hamilton, Charles Ruggles	Romantic comedy	Paramount
Held to Answer	Harold M. Shaw	House Peters, Evelyn Brent	Drama	Metro
Hell's Hole	Emmett J. Flynn	Buck Jones, Ruth Clifford	Western	Fox Film
Her Accidental Husband	Dallas M. Fitzgerald	Miriam Cooper, Forrest Stanley	Drama	Columbia
Her Fatal Millions	William Beaudine	Viola Dana, Huntley Gordon, Allan Forrest	Comedy	Metro
Her Reputation	John Griffith Wray	May McAvoy, Lloyd Hughes	Drama	First National
Her Temporary Husband	John McDermott	Owen Moore, Syd Chaplin, Sylvia Breamer	Comedy	First National
The Hero	Louis J. Gasnier	Gaston Glass, Barbara La Marr	Drama	Preferred
His Children's Children	Sam Wood	Bebe Daniels, James Rennie, Dorothy Mackaill	Drama	Paramount
His Last Race	B. Reeves Eason	Pauline Starke, Noah Beery, Gladys Brockwell	Drama	Independent
His Mystery Girl	Robert F. Hill	Herbert Rawlinson, Ruth Dwyer	Comedy	Universal
Hollywood	James Cruze	George K. Arthur, Ruby Lafayette	Comedy	Paramount
Homeward Bound	Ralph Ince	Thomas Meighan, Lila Lee	Adventure	Paramount
Hoodman Blind	John Ford	David Butler, Gladys Hulette	Drama	Fox Film
Human Wreckage	John Griffith Wray	Dorothy Davenport, Bessie Love	Drama	FBO
The Hunchback of Notre Dame	Wallace Worsley	Lon Chaney, Patsy Ruth Miller, Norman Kerry	Drama	Universal
The Huntress	John Francis Dillon, Lynn Reynolds	Colleen Moore, Lloyd Hughes	Drama	First National

== I ==
Title	Director	Cast	Genre	Notes
If Winter Comes	Harry Millarde	Percy Marmont, Raymond Bloomer	Drama	Fox Film
In Search of a Thrill	Oscar Apfel	Viola Dana, Warner Baxter	Drama	Metro
In the Palace of the King	Emmett J. Flynn	Blanche Sweet, Pauline Starke, Edmund Lowe	Historical	Goldwyn
Innocence	Edward J. Le Saint	Anna Q. Nilsson, Earle Foxe	Drama	Columbia
Is Money Everything?	Glen Lyons	Norman Kerry, Miriam Cooper, Martha Mansfield	Drama	Independent
The Isle of Lost Ships	Maurice Tourneur	Anna Q. Nilsson, Milton Sills	Adventure	First National
Itching Palms	James W. Horne	Tom Gallery, Herschel Mayall	Horror	FBO

== J ==
Title	Director	Cast	Genre	Notes
Jacqueline	Dell Henderson	Marguerite Courtot, Lew Cody, Edmund Breese	Drama	Arrow
Java Head	George Melford	Leatrice Joy, Jacqueline Logan	Drama	Paramount
Jazzmania	Robert Z. Leonard	Mae Murray, Rod LaRocque	Drama	Metro
Jealous Husbands	Maurice Tourneur	Earle Williams, Jane Novak	Drama	First National
Just Like a Woman	Scott R. Beal	Marguerite De La Motte, George Fawcett, Ralph Graves	Comedy	Hodkinson

== K ==
Title	Director	Cast	Genre	Notes
Kentucky Days	David Selman	Dustin Farnum, Bruce Gordon	Adventure	Fox Film
Kindled Courage	William Worthington	Hoot Gibson, Beatrice Burnham	Western	Universal

== L ==
Title	Director	Cast	Genre	Notes
The Last Hour	Edward Sloman	Milton Sills, Carmel Myers	Crime	Independent
The Last Moment	J. Parker Read Jr.	Henry Hull, Doris Kenyon	Thriller	Goldwyn
Law of the Lawless	Victor Fleming	Dorothy Dalton, Charles de Rochefort	Drama	Paramount
The Law Rustlers	Louis King	William Fairbanks, Ena Gregory, Edmund Cobb	Western	Arrow
Lawful Larceny	Allan Dwan	Hope Hampton, Conrad Nagel, Nita Naldi	Drama	Paramount
The Leavenworth Case	Charles Giblyn	Seena Owen, Wilfred Lytell	Mystery	Vitagraph
Legally Dead	William Parke	Milton Sills, Claire Adams	Crime	Universal
The Leopardess	Henry Kolker	Alice Brady, Montagu Love	Drama	Paramount
Let's Go	William K. Howard	Richard Talmadge, Eileen Percy	Adventure	Independent
Lights Out	Alfred Santell	Ruth Stonehouse, Walter McGrail, Theodore von Eltz	Crime	FBO
The Light That Failed	George Melford	Jacqueline Logan, Percy Marmont, David Torrence	Drama	Paramount
Little Church Around the Corner	William A. Seiter	Claire Windsor, Kenneth Harlan	Drama	Warner Bros.
The Little Girl Next Door	W. S. Van Dyke	Pauline Starke, James W. Morrison	Drama	Independent
Little Johnny Jones	Arthur Rosson	Wyndham Standing, Margaret Seddon	Comedy	Warner Bros.
Little Old New York	Sidney Olcott	Marion Davies, Harrison Ford	Historical	Goldwyn
The Lone Star Ranger	Lambert Hillyer	Tom Mix, Billie Dove	Western	Fox Film
The Lonely Road	Victor Schertzinger	Katherine MacDonald, Orville Caldwell	Drama	First National
Long Live the King	Victor Schertzinger	Jackie Coogan, Rosemary Theby, Alan Hale	Drama	Metro
Look Your Best	Rupert Hughes	Colleen Moore, Antonio Moreno	Comedy	Goldwyn
Lost and Found on a South Sea Island	Raoul Walsh	House Peters, Pauline Starke, Antonio Moreno	Drama	Goldwyn
Lost in a Big City	George Irving	Charles Byer, Jane Thomas	Drama	Independent
Lovebound	Henry Otto	Shirley Mason, Alan Roscoe	Crime	Fox Film
The Love Brand	Stuart Paton	Roy Stewart, Margaret Landis	Western	Universal
The Love Letter	King Baggot	Gladys Walton, Fontaine La Rue	Crime	Universal
The Love Piker	E. Mason Hopper	Anita Stewart, Robert Frazer	Romance	Goldwyn
The Love Pirate	Richard Thomas	Melbourne MacDowell, Carmel Myers	Drama	FBO
The Love Trap	John Ince	Bryant Washburn, Wheeler Oakman, Kate Lester	Drama	Independent
Loyal Lives	Charles Giblyn	Mary Carr, Faire Binney	Drama	Vitagraph
Luck	C.C. Burr	Johnny Hines, Violet Mersereau, Robert Edeson	Comedy	Independent
Lucretia Lombard	Jack Conway	Irene Rich, Monte Blue, Norma Shearer	Drama	Warner Bros.

== M ==
Title	Director	Cast	Genre	Notes
Madness of Youth	Jerome Storm	John Gilbert, Billie Dove	Drama	Fox Film
The Mailman	Emory Johnson	Ralph Lewis, Johnnie Walker	Drama	FBO
Main Street	Harry Beaumont	Florence Vidor, Monte Blue, Louise Fazenda	Drama	Warner Bros.
Man Alone	William Clifford	Hobart Bosworth, William Conklin	Drama	Independent
The Man Between	Finis Fox	Allan Forrest, Edna Murphy	Crime	Independent
The Man from Brodney's	David Smith	Alice Calhoun, Wanda Hawley	Drama	Vitagraph
The Man Life Passed By	Victor Schertzinger	Jane Novak, Eva Novak	Drama	Metro
The Man Next Door	Victor Schertzinger	David Torrence, Alice Calhoun	Comedy	Vitagraph
A Man of Action	James W. Horne	Marguerite De La Motte, Raymond Hatton	Crime comedy	First National
The Man Who Won	William A. Wellman	Dustin Farnum, Jacqueline Gadsden	Drama	Fox Film
Man's Size	Howard M. Mitchell	William Russell, Alma Bennett	Western	Fox Film
Mark of the Beast	Thomas Dixon Jr.	Robert Ellis, Madelyn Clare, Warner Richmond	Drama	Hodkinson
The Marriage Maker	William C. de Mille	Agnes Ayres, Jack Holt, Mary Astor	Romance	Paramount
The Marriage Market	Edward LeSaint	Pauline Garon, Jack Mulhall	Romantic comedy	Columbia
Marriage Morals	William Nigh	Tom Moore, Ann Forrest, Harry T. Morey	Drama	Independent
Mary of the Movies	John McDermott	Marion Mack, Creighton Hale	Comedy	FBO
Masters of Men	David Smith	Earle Williams, Alice Calhoun, Cullen Landis	Drama	Vitagraph
Maytime	Louis J. Gasnier	Ethel Shannon, Clara Bow	Romance	Preferred
McGuire of the Mounted	Richard Stanton	William Desmond, Louise Lorraine	Western	Universal
The Meanest Man in the World	Edward F. Cline	Bert Lytell, Blanche Sweet	Comedy	First National
Men in the Raw	George Marshall	Jack Hoxie, Marguerite Clayton	Western	Universal
Merry-Go-Round	Erich von Stroheim	Norman Kerry, Mary Philbin	Drama	Universal
Michael O'Halloran	James Leo Meehan	Virginia True Boardman, Ethel Irving, Irene Rich	Drama	Hodkinson
The Midnight Alarm	David Smith	Alice Calhoun, Percy Marmont, Cullen Landis	Drama	Vitagraph
The Midnight Guest	George Archainbaud	Grace Darmond, Mahlon Hamilton	Crime	Universal
Mighty Lak' a Rose	Edwin Carewe	James Rennie, Dorothy Mackaill, Anders Randolf	Drama	First National
Mile-a-Minute Romeo	Lambert Hillyer	Tom Mix, James Mason	Western	Fox Film
A Million to Burn	William Parke	Herbert Rawlinson, Beatrice Burnham	Comedy	Universal
Mine to Keep	Ben F. Wilson	Bryant Washburn, Mabel Forrest, Wheeler Oakman	Drama	Independent
The Miracle Baby	Val Paul	Harry Carey, Margaret Landis	Western	FBO
The Miracle Makers	W. S. Van Dyke	Leah Baird, George Walsh	Drama	Independent
Modern Marriage	Lawrence C. Windom	Francis X. Bushman, Beverly Bayne	Crime	Independent
Modern Matrimony	Victor Heerman	Owen Moore, Alice Lake	Comedy	Selznick
Money, Money, Money	Tom Forman	Katherine MacDonald, Carl Stockdale	Drama	First National
Mothers-in-Law	Louis J. Gasnier	Ruth Clifford, Gaston Glass	Drama	Preferred
Mr. Billings Spends His Dime	Wesley Ruggles	Walter Hiers, Jacqueline Logan	Comedy	Paramount
The Mysterious Witness	Seymour Zeliff	Robert Gordon, Elinor Fair	Western	FBO

== N ==
Title	Director	Cast	Genre	Notes
The Nth Commandment	Frank Borzage	Colleen Moore, James Morrison	Drama	Paramount
The Near Lady	Herbert Blaché	Gladys Walton, Otis Harlan	Comedy	Universal
The Ne'er Do-Well	Alfred E. Green	Thomas Meighan, Lila Lee, Gertrude Astor	Comedy	Paramount
The Net	J. Gordon Edwards	Barbara Castleton, Alan Roscoe	Crime	Fox Film
No Mother to Guide Her	Charles Horan	Genevieve Tobin, John Webb Dillion	Drama	Fox Film
Nobody's Bride	Herbert Blaché	Herbert Rawlinson, Edna Murphy, Alice Lake	Crime	Universal
Nobody's Money	Wallace Worsley	Jack Holt, Wanda Hawley	Comedy	Paramount
A Noise in Newboro	Harry Beaumont	Viola Dana, David Butler, Eva Novak	Comedy	Metro
None So Blind	Burton L. King	Dore Davidson, Zena Keefe, Anders Randolph	Drama	Independent
North of Hudson Bay	John Ford	Tom Mix, Kathleen Key	Action	Fox Film

== O ==
Title	Director	Cast	Genre	Notes
The Old Fool	Edward D. Venturini	James O. Barrows, Lloyd Hughes, Betty Francisco	Western	Hodkinson
An Old Sweetheart of Mine	Harry Garson	Elliott Dexter, Helen Jerome Eddy	Romance	Metro
On the Banks of the Wabash	J. Stuart Blackton	Mary Carr, Madge Evans, Burr McIntosh	Drama	Vitagraph
One Million in Jewels	J. P. McGowan	Helen Holmes, Elinor Fair, Charles Craig	Crime	Independent
One Stolen Night	Robert Ensminger	Alice Calhoun, Herbert Heyes	Drama	Vitagraph
Only 38	William C. deMille	May McAvoy, Lois Wilson, Elliott Dexter	Drama	Paramount
Other Men's Daughters	Ben F. Wilson	Bryant Washburn, Kathleen Kirkham, Wheeler Oakman	Drama	Independent
Out of Luck	Edward Sedgwick	Hoot Gibson, Laura LaPlante	Western	Universal

== P–Q ==
Title	Director	Cast	Genre	Notes
Penrod and Sam	William Beaudine	Ben Alexander, Gertrude Messinger	Comedy drama	First National
The Pilgrim	Charles Chaplin	Charles Chaplin, Edna Purviance	Comedy	First National
Pioneer Trails	David Smith	Cullen Landis, Alice Calhoun	Western	Vitagraph
Playing It Wild	William Duncan	Edith Johnson, Edmund Cobb	Western	Vitagraph
Pleasure Mad	Reginald Barker	Huntley Gordon, Mary Alden, Norma Shearer	Drama	Metro
Poor Men's Wives	Louis J. Gasnier	Barbara La Marr, David Butler, Betty Francisco	Drama	Independent
Potash and Perlmutter	Clarence G. Badger	Martha Mansfield, Ben Lyon	Comedy	First National
A Prince of a King	Albert Austin	Dean Riesner, Virginia Pearson, Eric Mayne	Drama	Selznick
The Printer's Devil	William Beaudine	Wesley Barry, Harry Myers, Kathryn McGuire	Comedy	Warner Bros.
The Prisoner	Jack Conway	Herbert Rawlinson, Eileen Percy	Drama	Universal
Prodigal Daughters	Sam Wood	Gloria Swanson, Ralph Graves	Drama	Paramount
Pure Grit	Nat Ross	Roy Stewart, Esther Ralston	Western	Universal
Puritan Passions	Frank Tuttle	Glenn Hunter, Mary Astor	Drama	Hodkinson
The Purple Dawn	Charles R. Seeling	Bessie Love, Bert Sprotte, William E. Aldrich	Drama	Independent
The Purple Highway	Henry Kolker	Madge Kennedy, Monte Blue, Vincent Coleman, Pedro de Córdoba	Comedy drama	Paramount
Quicksands	Jack Conway	Helene Chadwick, Richard Dix, Alan Hale	Crime	Independent

== R ==
Title	Director	Cast	Genre	Notes
Racing Hearts	Paul Powell	Agnes Ayres, Richard Dix	Comedy drama	Paramount
The Ragged Edge	F. Harmon Weight	Alfred Lunt, George MacQuarrie	Romance	Goldwyn
Railroaded	Edmund Mortimer	Herbert Rawlinson, Esther Ralston	Drama	Universal
The Ramblin' Kid	Edward Sedgwick	Hoot Gibson, Laura La Plante	Western	Universal
Red Lights	Clarence G. Badger	Marie Prevost, Raymond Griffith	Comedy drama	Goldwyn
The Red Warning	Robert N. Bradbury	Jack Hoxie, Fred Kohler	Western	Universal
Refuge	Victor Schertzinger	Katherine MacDonald, Hugh Thompson	Drama	First National
The Remittance Woman	Wesley Ruggles	Ethel Clayton, Rockliffe Fellowes	Drama	FBO
The Rendezvous	Marshall Neilan	Richard Travers, Lucille Ricksen, Conrad Nagel	Adventure	Goldwyn
Reno	Rupert Hughes	Helene Chadwick, Lew Cody, George Walsh	Drama	Goldwyn
Richard the Lion-Hearted	Chester Withey	Wallace Beery, Charles K. Gerrard, Marguerite De La Motte	Historical	Independent
Romance Land	Edward Sedgwick	Tom Mix, Barbara Bedford	Western	Fox Film
Rosita	Ernst Lubitsch	Mary Pickford, Holbrook Blinn	Drama	United Artists
Rouged Lips	Harold M. Shaw	Viola Dana, Tom Moore	Drama	Metro
Ruggles of Red Gap	James Cruze	Edward Everett Horton, Ernest Torrence, Lois Wilson	Western	Paramount
Rupert of Hentzau	Victor Heerman	Bert Lytell, Elaine Hammerstein, Claire Windsor	Adventure	Selznick
The Rustle of Silk	Herbert Brenon	Betty Compson, Conway Tearle, Anna Q. Nilsson	Romance	Paramount

== S ==
Title	Director	Cast	Genre	Notes
Safety Last!	Fred C. Newmeyer, Sam Taylor	Harold Lloyd	Comedy	Pathé Exchange
Salomy Jane	George Melford	Jacqueline Logan, George Fawcett	Western	Paramount
The Satin Girl	Arthur Rosson	Norman Kerry, Marc McDermott	Crime	Independent
Sawdust	Jack Conway	Gladys Walton, Niles Welch, Edith Yorke	Drama	Universal
Scaramouche	Rex Ingram	Ramón Novarro, Alice Terry, Lewis Stone	Adventure	Metro
The Scarlet Car	Stuart Paton	Herbert Rawlinson, Claire Adams	Drama	Universal
The Scarlet Lily	Victor Schertzinger	Katherine MacDonald, Orville Caldwell	Drama	First National
Scars of Jealousy	Lambert Hillyer	Lloyd Hughes, Frank Keenan, Marguerite De La Motte	Drama	First National
Second Fiddle	Frank Tuttle	Glenn Hunter, Mary Astor	Comedy drama	Hodkinson
Second Hand Love	William A. Wellman	Buck Jones, Ruth Dwyer	Drama	Fox Film
The Self-Made Wife	John Francis Dillon	Ethel Grey Terry, Crauford Kent	Drama	Universal
Shadows of the North	Robert F. Hill	William Desmond, Virginia Brown Faire	Adventure	Universal
The Shepherd King	J. Gordon Edwards	Violet Mersereau, Nerio Bernardi	Drama	Fox Film
The Shock	Lambert Hillyer	Lon Chaney, Virginia Valli	Drama	Universal
Shootin' for Love	Edward Sedgwick	Hoot Gibson, Laura La Plante	Western	Universal
The Shriek of Araby	F. Richard Jones	Ben Turpin, Kathryn McGuire	Comedy	United Artists
The Silent Command	J. Gordon Edwards	Edmund Lowe, Béla Lugosi	Drama	Fox Film
The Silent Partner	Charles Maigne	Leatrice Joy, Owen Moore	Drama	Paramount
Single Handed	Edward Sedgwick	Hoot Gibson	Western	Universal
Sinner or Saint	Lawrence C. Windom	Betty Blythe, William P. Carleton	Drama	Selznick
Six Cylinder Love	Elmer Clifton	Ernest Truex, Florence Eldridge	Comedy	Fox Film
Six Days	Charles Brabin	Corinne Griffith, Frank Mayo, Myrtle Stedman	Drama	Goldwyn
The Six-Fifty	Nat Ross	Renée Adorée, Orville Caldwell, Gertrude Astor	Drama	Universal
Sixty Cents an Hour	Joseph Henabery	Walter Hiers, Jacqueline Logan, Ricardo Cortez	Comedy	Paramount
Skid Proof	Scott R. Dunlap	Buck Jones, Jacqueline Gadsden	Drama	Fox Film
Slander the Woman	Allen Holubar	Dorothy Phillips, Lewis Dayton	Drama	First National
Slave of Desire	George D. Baker	George Walsh, Bessie Love, Carmel Myers	Drama	Goldwyn
Slippy McGee	Wesley Ruggles	Colleen Moore, Wheeler Oakman, Sam De Grasse	Drama	First National
Slow as Lightning	Grover Jones	Kenneth MacDonald, Gordon Sackville	Action	Independent
The Snow Bride	Henry Kolker	Alice Brady, Maurice "Lefty" Flynn	Romance	Paramount
Snowdrift	Scott R. Dunlap	Buck Jones, Irene Rich	Action	Fox Film
The Social Code	Oscar Apfel	Viola Dana, Malcolm McGregor, Edna Flugrath	Drama	Metro
Soft Boiled	John G. Blystone	Tom Mix, Billie Dove	Western comedy	Fox Film
The Song of Love	Chester M. Franklin	Norma Talmadge, Joseph Schildkraut	Adventure	First National
Soul of the Beast	John Griffith Wray	Madge Bellamy, Cullen Landis, Noah Beery	Drama	Metro
Souls for Sale	Rupert Hughes	Richard Dix, Eleanor Boardman	Drama	Goldwyn
South Sea Love	David Selman	Shirley Mason, Francis McDonald	Drama	Fox Film
The Spanish Dancer	Herbert Brenon	Pola Negri, Antonio Moreno, Wallace Beery	Romance	Paramount
Spawn of the Desert	Louis King	William Fairbanks, Florence Gilbert	Western	Arrow
The Spider and the Rose	John McDermott	Alice Lake, Gaston Glass, Robert McKim	Drama	Independent
The Spoilers	Lambert Hillyer	Milton Sills, Anna Q. Nilsson	Western	Goldwyn
St. Elmo	Jerome Storm	John Gilbert, Barbara La Marr, Bessie Love	Drama	Fox Film
The Steadfast Heart	Sheridan Hall	Marguerite Courtot, Miriam Battista	Drama	Goldwyn
Stephen Steps Out	Joseph Henabery	Douglas Fairbanks Jr., Harry Myers, Noah Beery	Comedy	Paramount
Stepping Fast	Joseph Franz	Tom Mix, Claire Adams	Western	Fox Film
Stormswept	Robert Thornby	Wallace Beery, Noah Beery, Virginia Brown Faire	Drama	FBO
Strangers of the Night	Fred Niblo	Matt Moore, Enid Bennett, Barbara La Marr	Comedy mystery	Metro
Success	Ralph Ince	Brandon Tynan, Naomi Childers, Mary Astor	Drama	Metro
The Sunshine Trail	James W. Horne	Douglas MacLean, Edith Roberts	Western	First National
Suzanna	F. Richard Jones	Mabel Normand, Walter McGrail	Comedy	Independent

== T ==
Title	Director	Cast	Genre	Notes
The Tango Cavalier	Charles R. Seeling	George Larkin, Frank Whitson, Ollie Kirkby	Western	Independent
Tea: With a Kick!	Erle C. Kenton	Doris May, Creighton Hale, Ralph Lewis	Comedy	Independent
The Temple of Venus	Henry Otto	William Walling, Mary Philbin, Alice Day	Fantasy	Fox Film
Temporary Marriage	Lambert Hillyer	Kenneth Harlan, Mildred Davis	Drama	Independent
Temptation	Edward LeSaint	Bryant Washburn, Eva Novak	Drama	Columbia
The Ten Commandments	Cecil B. DeMille	Theodore Roberts	Epic	Paramount
The Tents of Allah	Charles A. Logue	Monte Blue, Mary Alden, Mary Thurman	Drama	Associated Exhibitors
Three Jumps Ahead	John Ford	Tom Mix, Alma Bennett	Western	Fox Film
Three O'Clock in the Morning	Kenneth S. Webb	Constance Binney, Edmund Breese	Drama	Independent
Three Who Paid	Colin Campbell	Dustin Farnum, Bessie Love	Western	Fox Film
Three Wise Fools	King Vidor	Claude Gillingwater, Eleanor Boardman	Drama	Goldwyn
The Thrill Chaser	Edward Sedgwick	Hoot Gibson, Billie Dove, James Neill	Western	Universal
Thundergate	Joseph De Grasse	Owen Moore, Virginia Brown Faire	Drama	First National
Thundering Dawn	Harry Garson	J. Warren Kerrigan, Anna Q. Nilsson	Drama	Universal
The Tie That Binds	Joseph Levering	Walter Miller, Barbara Bedford, Raymond Hatton	Drama	Warner Bros.
Tiger Rose	Sidney Franklin	Lenore Ulric, Forrest Stanley	Adventure	Warner Bros.
The Tiger's Claw	Joseph Henabery	Jack Holt, Eva Novak	Drama	Paramount
Times Have Changed	James Flood	William Russell, Mabel Julienne Scott	Comedy drama	Fox Film
Tipped Off	Finis Fox	Arline Pretty, Stuart Holmes, Noah Beery	Drama	Independent
To the Ladies	James Cruze	Edward Everett Horton, Louise Dresser, Helen Jerome Eddy	Comedy	Paramount
To the Last Man	Victor Fleming	Richard Dix, Lois Wilson, Noah Beery Sr.	Western	Paramount
Toilers of the Sea	Roy William Neill	Lucy Fox, Holmes Herbert	Drama	Selznick
The Town Scandal	King Baggot	Gladys Walton, Edward Hearn	Comedy	Universal
The Trail of the Lonesome Pine	Charles Maigne	Mary Miles Minter, Antonio Moreno	Drama	Paramount
Trifling with Honor	Harry A. Pollard	Rockliffe Fellowes, Fritzi Ridgeway	Crime	Universal
Trilby	James Young	Andrée Lafayette, Creighton Hale	Drama	First National
Trimmed in Scarlet	Jack Conway	Kathlyn Williams, Lucille Ricksen	Adventure	Universal
The Truth About Wives	Lawrence C. Windom	Betty Blythe, Tyrone Power Sr.	Drama	Independent
Truxton King	Jerome Storm	John Gilbert, Ruth Clifford	Drama	Fox Film
Twenty-One	John S. Robertson	Richard Barthelmess, Dorothy Mackaill	Romance	First National

== U ==
Title	Director	Cast	Genre	Notes
Under the Red Robe	Alan Crosland	Robert B. Mantell, Alma Rubens	Historical	Goldwyn
The Unknown Purple	Roland West	Henry B. Walthall, Alice Lake, Stuart Holmes	Science fiction	Independent
Unseeing Eyes	Edward H. Griffith	Lionel Barrymore, Seena Owen, Gustav von Seyffertitz	Drama	Goldwyn
The Untameable	Herbert Blaché	Gladys Walton, Malcolm McGregor	Drama	Universal

== V ==
Title	Director	Cast	Genre	Notes
Vanity Fair	Hugo Ballin	Mabel Ballin, Hobart Bosworth, George Walsh	Drama	Goldwyn
The Victor	Edward Laemmle	Herbert Rawlinson, Dorothy Manners	Sports comedy	Universal
The Virginian	Tom Forman	Florence Vidor, Kenneth Harlan	Western	Preferred
The Voice from the Minaret	Frank Lloyd	Norma Talmadge, Eugene O'Brien	Romance	First National

== W ==
Title	Director	Cast	Genre	Notes
Wandering Daughters	James Young	Marguerite De La Motte, Marjorie Daw	Comedy	First National
The Wanters	John M. Stahl	Marie Prevost, Norma Shearer, Gertrude Astor	Drama	First National
The West~Bound Limited	Emory Johnson	Ralph Lewis, Claire McDowell, Ella Hall	Drama	FBO
West of the Water Tower	Rollin S. Sturgeon	Glenn Hunter, May McAvoy, Ernest Torrence	Comedy	Paramount
What a Wife Learned	John Griffith Wray	John Bowers, Milton Sills, Marguerite De La Motte	Drama	First National
What Wives Want	Jack Conway	Ethel Grey Terry, Vernon Steele	Drama	Universal
When Odds Are Even	James Flood	William Russell, Dorothy Devore	Drama	Fox Film
Where Is This West?	George Marshall	Jack Hoxie, Mary Philbin	Western comedy	Universal
Where the North Begins	Chester M. Franklin	Claire Adams, Walter McGrail, Rin Tin Tin	Drama	Warner Bros.
Where the Pavement Ends	Rex Ingram	Alice Terry, Ramon Novarro	Romance	Metro
While Paris Sleeps	Maurice Tourneur	Lon Chaney, John Gilbert, Hardee Kirkland	Horror	Hodkinson
The White Flower	Julia Crawford Ivers	Betty Compson, Edmund Lowe	Romance	Paramount
The White Rose	D. W. Griffith	Carol Dempster, Mae Marsh, Ivor Novello	Drama	United Artists
The White Sister	Henry King	Lillian Gish, Ronald Colman	Drama	Metro
White Tiger	Tod Browning	Priscilla Dean, Matt Moore	Crime	Universal
Why Women Remarry	John Gorman	Milton Sills, Ethel Grey Terry, William Lowery	Drama	Independent
Why Worry?	Fred Newmeyer, Sam Taylor	Harold Lloyd, Jobyna Ralston	Comedy	Pathé Exchange
Wife in Name Only	George Terwilliger	Edmund Lowe, Mary Thurman, Edna May Oliver	Drama	Selznick
A Wife's Romance	Thomas N. Heffron	Clara Kimball Young, Lewis Dayton	Drama	Metro
Wild Bill Hickok	Clifford Smith	William S. Hart, Ethel Grey Terry	Western	Paramount
The Wild Party	Herbert Blaché	Gladys Walton, Robert Ellis, Esther Ralston	Comedy drama	Universal
Within the Law	Frank Lloyd	Norma Talmadge, Lew Cody	Drama	First National
Wolf Tracks	Robert N. Bradbury	Jack Hoxie, Marin Sais	Western	Independent
The Woman in Chains	William P. Burt	Jean Acker, Martha Mansfield	Drama	Metro
The Woman of Bronze	King Vidor	Clara Kimball Young, John Bowers	Drama	Metro
A Woman of Paris	Charles Chaplin	Edna Purviance, Carl Miller	Romance Drama	United Artists
Woman-Proof	Alfred E. Green	Thomas Meighan, Lila Lee, Louise Dresser	Comedy	Paramount
The Woman with Four Faces	Herbert Brenon	Betty Compson, Richard Dix, Theodore von Eltz	Crime	Paramount
The World's Applause	William C. DeMille	Bebe Daniels, Lewis Stone	Drama	Paramount

== Y–Z ==
Title	Director	Cast	Genre	Notes
Yesterday's Wife	Edward LeSaint	Irene Rich, Eileen Percy	Romance	Columbia
You Are Guilty	Edgar Lewis	James Kirkwood, Doris Kenyon, Mary Carr	Drama	Independent
You Can't Fool Your Wife	George Melford	Leatrice Joy, Nita Naldi	Drama	Paramount
You Can't Get Away with It	Rowland V. Lee	Percy Marmont, Malcolm McGregor	Drama	Fox Film
Your Friend and Mine	Clarence G. Badger	Enid Bennett, Huntley Gordon	Drama	Metro
Youthful Cheaters	Frank Tuttle	Glenn Hunter, Martha Mansfield	Drama	Hodkinson
Zaza	Allan Dwan	Gloria Swanson, H. B. Warner	Romance	Paramount

== Shorts ==
Title	Director	Cast	Genre	Notes
The Crown of Courage	Frederick G. Becker	Bessie Love, Arthur Trimble	Fantasy	Arthur Trimble Productions / Anchor
The Handy Man	Robert P. Kerr	Stan Laurel	Comedy	Independent
The Little Knight	Frederick G. Becker	Bessie Love, Arthur Trimble	Fantasy	Arthur Trimble Productions / Anchor
The Love Charm	Frederick G. Becker	Bessie Love, Arthur Trimble	Fantasy	Arthur Trimble Productions / Anchor
Our Hospitality	John G. Blystone, Buster Keaton	Buster Keaton, Natalie Talmadge	Comedy	Metro
Three Ages	Buster Keaton	Buster Keaton, Margaret Leahy, Wallace Beery	Comedy	Metro

== See also ==
- 1923 in the United States
