= The Girl in His Room =

1922 film

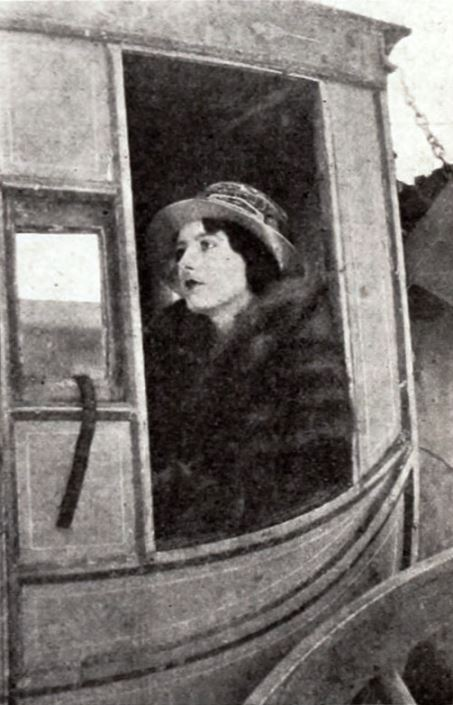
- Directed by: Edward José
- Written by: C. Graham Baker; J. Raleigh Davies; Harry Dittmar
- Produced by: Albert E. Smith
- Starring: Alice Calhoun; Warner Baxter; Eve Southern
- Cinematography: Ernest F. Smith
- Production company: Vitagraph Company of America
- Distributed by: Vitagraph Company of America
- Release date: June 4, 1922
- Running time: 50 minutes
- Country: United States
- Languages: Silent; English intertitles

The Girl in His Room is a 1922 American silent drama film directed by Edward José and starring Alice Calhoun, Warner Baxter and Eve Southern.

== Cast ==
- Alice Calhoun as Myra Pendleton
- Warner Baxter as Kirk Waring
- Robert Anderson as Paul Duprez
- Faye O'Neill as Molly Maguire
- Eve Southern as Elinor Larrimore

== Bibliography ==
- Connelly, Robert B. The Silents: Silent Feature Films, 1910-36, Volume 40, Issue 2. December Press, 1998.
- Munden, Kenneth White. The American Film Institute Catalog of Motion Pictures Produced in the United States, Part 1. University of California Press, 1997.
