= The Angel of Crooked Street =

1922 film

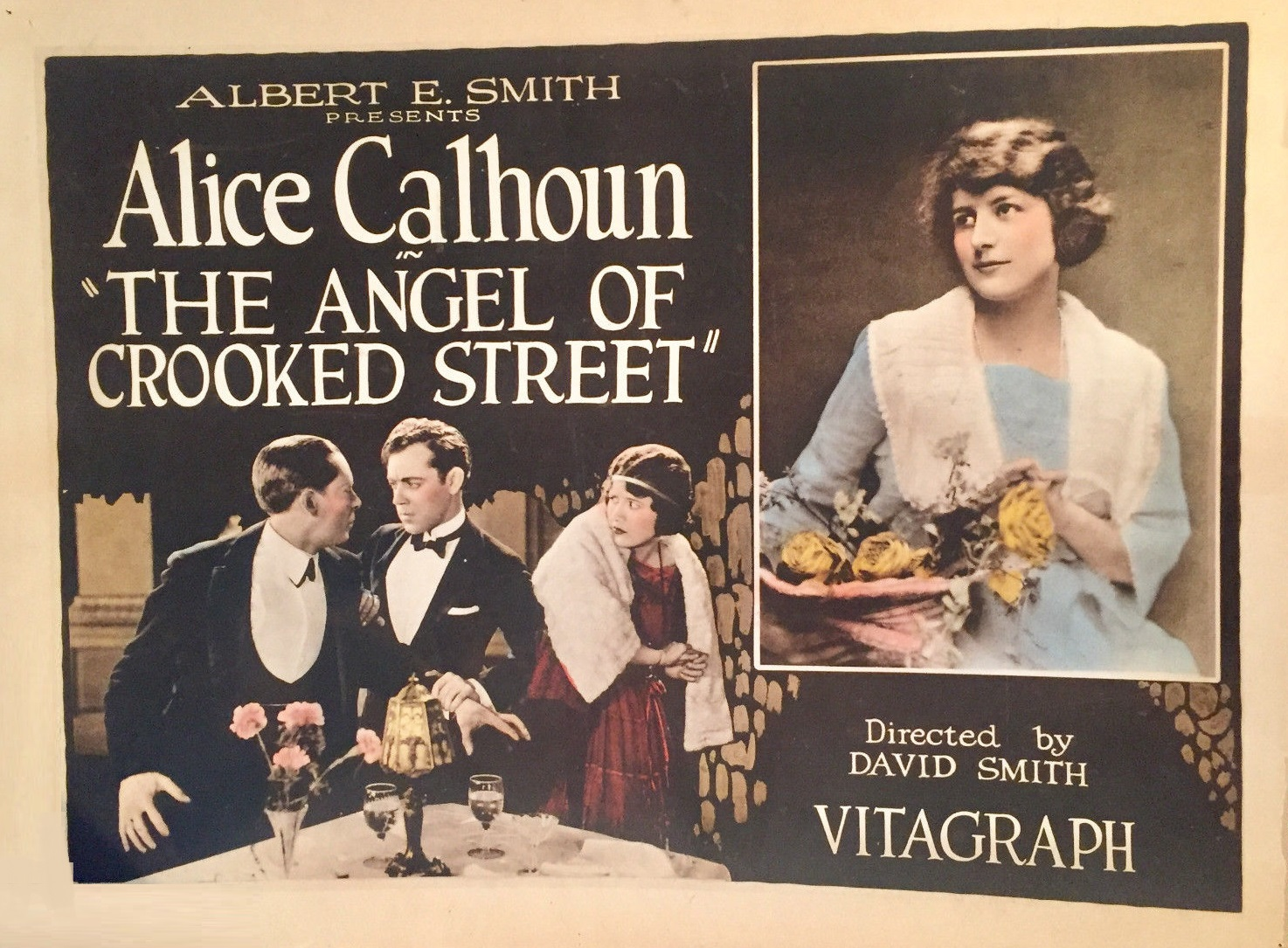
- Directed by: David Smith
- Written by: C. Graham Baker; Harry Dittmar
- Produced by: Albert E. Smith
- Starring: Alice Calhoun; Ralph McCullough; William McCall
- Cinematography: W. Steve Smith Jr.
- Production company: Vitagraph Company of America
- Distributed by: Vitagraph Company of America
- Release date: April 23, 1922
- Running time: 50 minutes
- Country: United States
- Languages: Silent; English intertitles

The Angel of Crooked Street is a 1922 American silent crime drama film directed by David Smith and starring Alice Calhoun, Ralph McCullough and William McCall. Lobby cards for the film are extant.

== Plot ==
Jennie Marsh, a young woman working as a maid is unjustly accused of theft when the man she brings home from dance proceeds to rob the house of her employer. She is sent to a reformatory and on release is embittered against the world and decides to take revenge on her former employer Mrs. Sandford. She plans to frame her son Schuyler for a robbery he didn't commit.

== Cast ==
- Alice Calhoun as Jennie Marsh
- Ralph McCullough as Schuyler Sanford
- Scott McKee as 'Silent' McKay
- Rex Hammel as 'Kid Glove' Thurston
- William McCall as 'Cap' Berry
- Nellie Anderson as 'Mother' De Vere
- Martha Mattox as Mrs. Phineas Sandford
- Mary Young as Mrs. Marsh
- George Stanley as Stoneham
- Walter Cooper as Dan Bolton

== Preservation ==
With no holdings located in archives, The Angel of Crooked Street is considered a lost film.

== Bibliography ==
- Connelly, Robert B. The Silents: Silent Feature Films, 1910-36, Volume 40, Issue 2. December Press, 1998.
- Munden, Kenneth White. The American Film Institute Catalog of Motion Pictures Produced in the United States, Part 1. University of California Press, 1997.
