= Code of the Wilderness =

1924 film

- Directed by: David Smith
- Written by: Jay Pilcher; Charles Alden Seltzer
- Produced by: Albert E. Smith
- Starring: John Bowers; Alice Calhoun; Alan Hale
- Production company: Vitagraph Company of America
- Distributed by: Vitagraph Company of America
- Release date: June 30, 1924
- Running time: 70 minutes (6 reels)
- Country: United States
- Languages: Silent; English intertitles

Code of the Wilderness is a 1924 American silent Western film directed by David Smith and starring John Bowers, Alice Calhoun, and Alan Hale.

The film was originally written to be seven reels long, but ended up being only six.

== Plot ==
As described in the Library of Congress motion picture copyright description, Ruth Harkness, her Aunt Martha, Uncle Jepson, and Ruth's fiancé, Willard Masten, travel west to live at the Flying W Ranch. The property has been left to Ruth by a late uncle. During the group's journey, a ranch foreman named Rex Randerson helps them ford a stream. Tensions soon arise between Masten and Randerson.

Masten meets local man Catherson and his daughter Hagar, who quickly falls for Masten. Believing Ruth no longer cares for him, Masten begins an affair with Hagar.

Planning to get rid of Randerson, Masten secretly arranges for one of the "punchers" to insult Ruth, which leads her to inform Masten about the incident. However, he refuses to retaliate and tells Ruth that doing so will lead to violence. Randerson learns about the situation and assaults the puncher and orders the man to apologize to Ruth. The puncher attempts to murder Randerson, but Randerson is a faster shot and shoots the puncher dead. This upsets Ruth, but Randerson insists that he "followed the code of the country."

Uncle Jepson discovers Masten's scheming, and he informs Randerson. However, Randerson decides not to confront Masten out of respect for Ruth. Randerson visits Hagar multiple times, leading others to believe he is romantically interested in her.

Ruth and Randerson discover evidence of cattle rustling. He informs her that it's normal to hang cattle thieves, and she orders such punishment no longer take place on the Flying W.

Uncle Jepson and Randerson learn of Masten and Hagar's affair. Randerson beats Masten in a fist-fight, telling him to end the relationship and stay away from Hagar. Meanwhile, Ruth learns that Chavis (the straw boss of the ranch) and an outlaw accomplice are the cattle thieves.

A man name named Kelso attempts to kill Randerson. The hit goes awry and, as Kelso lies dying from Randerson's gunshot, he reveals that Masten hired him. Ruth learns of the shooting and, not known Masten was behind the incident, blames Randerson for yet another killing. As a result, he resigns from his job.

Hagar's father, Catherson, learns of his daughter's affair and mistakes Randerson for her lover. Catherson heads to the ranch to exact revenge, but Hagar arrives just in time to stop him. She confesses that her affair was with Masten. Catherson tracks down Masten, ties him up with a rope, and drags the man across the desert as punishment. Masten survives the ordeal and, having learned his lesson, returns to Hagar.

Ruth is attacked by Chavis and shoots him in self-defense. Randerson and Hagar find Ruth and Chavis, who does not die from his wound. Ruth, having fallen in love with Randerson, asks him to stay at the Flying W as her husband, which he accepts.

== Cast ==
- John Bowers as Rex Randerson
- Alice Calhoun as Ruth Harkness
- Alan Hale as Willard Masten
- Charlotte Merriam as Hagar
- Otis Harlan as Uncle Jepson
- Kitty Bradbury as Aunt Martha
- Joe Rickson as Tom Chavis
- Clifford Davidson as Jim Picket

== Critical response ==
Moving Picture World magazine reported the film was well received by Los Angeles critics. The publication quoted the Los Angeles Express review, writing that the film was "a considerably entertaining opus for those who like this [genre]. There is not quite as much blood and thunder in it as there is in the usual run of the great-open-spaces pictures, but the exciting moments which do occur satisfactorily replace revolver barrages."

However, a Moving Picture World review from the Bijou Theatre in Greenville, South Carolina, pointed out that there "was nothing pertaining to wilderness" in the film and lamented "It's a pity names of pictures are so misleading."

== Preservation status ==
A print is preserved in France at Archives Du Film Du CNC (Bois D'Arcy archive).
