= My Man (1924 film) =

1924 film

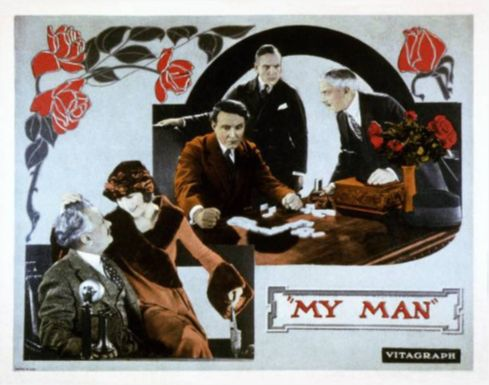
- Lobby card
- Directed by: David Smith
- Written by: Donald I. Buchanan
- Produced by: Albert E. Smith
- Starring: Patsy Ruth Miller; Dustin Farnum; Niles Welch
- Cinematography: W. Steve Smith Jr.
- Production company: Vitagraph Company of America
- Distributed by: Vitagraph Company of America
- Release date: February 10, 1924
- Running time: 70 minutes
- Country: United States
- Language: Silent (English intertitles)

My Man is a 1924 American silent drama film directed by David Smith and starring Patsy Ruth Miller, Dustin Farnum, and Niles Welch.

== Plot ==
As described in a review of the film in a film magazine, Sledge, the political boss of a small city, combines with a promoter to establish a new street car line. In the meantime he sees and falls in love with Molly, the daughter of the president of the existing street car line, but is opposed by Bert Gilder, a lounge lizard. Sledge starts his wooing of Molly and impresses her with his force and lavishness of his presents, but she thinks he is uncouth, resents his attempts to dominate her and prepares to marry Gilder. Sledge kidnaps her but relents and sends her back home. She learns that Gilder is a scoundrel and finally agrees to marry Sledge.

== Cast ==
- Patsy Ruth Miller as Molly Marley
- Dustin Farnum as Sledge
- Niles Welch as Dicky Reynolds
- Margaret Landis as Fern Burbank
- George Webb as Bert Gilder
- William Norris as Henry Peters
- Edith Murgatroyd as Mrs. Peters
- Violet Palmer as Jessie Peters
- Sidney De Gray as Christopher Marley

== Preservation ==
With no prints of My Man located in any film archives, it is a lost film.

== Bibliography ==
- Munden, Kenneth White. The American Film Institute Catalog of Motion Pictures Produced in the United States, Part 1. University of California Press, 1997.
