= Rainbow (1921 film) =

1921 film

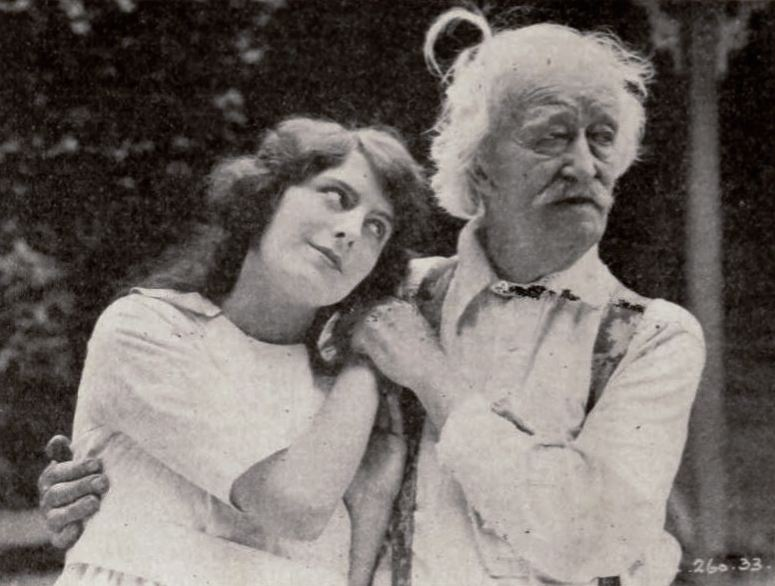
- Alice Calhoun, William J. Gross
- Directed by: Edward José
- Written by: C. Graham Baker
- Based on: story by Harry Dittmar
- Produced by: Vitagraph Company of America
- Starring: Alice Calhoun
- Distributed by: Vitagraph Company
- Release date: November 20, 1921
- Running time: 5 reels
- Country: USA
- Language: Silent..English titles

Rainbow is a lost 1921 silent film drama directed by Edward José and starring Alice Calhoun. It was produced and distributed by the Vitagraph Company of America.

== Cast ==
- Alice Calhoun – Rainbow Halliday
- Jack Roach – George Standish
- William J. Gross – Shang Jordan
- Charles Kent – Andy MacTavish
- Tom O'Malley – Denny Farrell
- George Lessey – Rufus Halliday
- Cecil Kern – Estelle Jackson
- Tammany Young – Kid Short
- Ivan Christy – Joe Sheady
