= A Gentleman's Agreement =

1918 film by David Smith

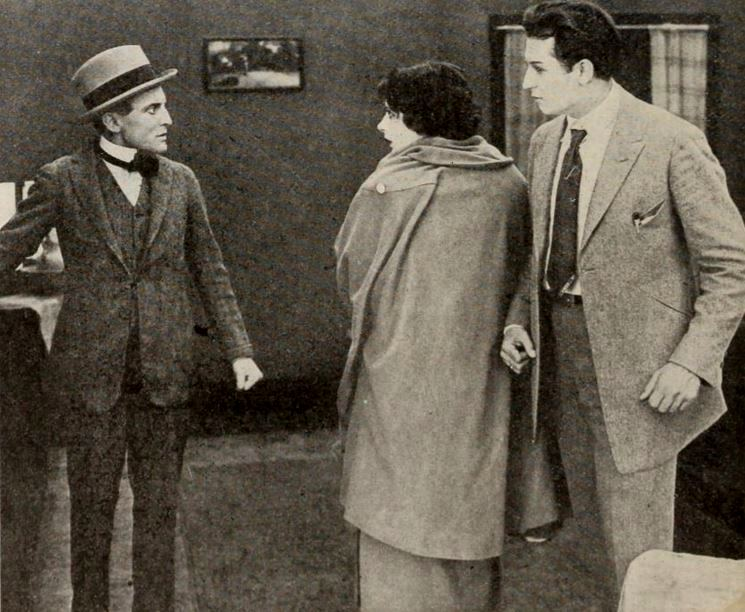
- Still of the film with an unidentified actor, Nell Shipman, and Gayne Whitman
- Directed by: David Smith
- Written by: Frederick Buckley (scenario)
- Based on: Gentleman's Agreement; 1914 story in McClure's Magazine by Wallace Irwin
- Produced by: Albert E. Smith
- Starring: Gayne Whitman; Nell Shipman; Juan de la Cruz; Jacob Abrams; Hattie Buskirk
- Cinematography: Charles R. Seeling
- Production companies: Vitagraph Company of America; A Blue Ribbon Feature
- Distributed by: Vitagraph Company of America
- Release date: July 29, 1918
- Running time: 5 reels
- Country: United States
- Languages: Silent film (English intertitles)

A Gentleman's Agreement is a 1918 American silent drama film directed by David Smith and starring Gayne Whitman, Nell Shipman, Juan de la Cruz, Jacob Abrams, and Hattie Buskirk. The film was released by Vitagraph Company of America on July 29, 1918.

== Cast ==
- Gayne Whitman as Allen Spargo (credited as Alfred Whitman)
- Nell Shipman as Theresa Kane
- Juan de la Cruz as Lemuel Antree
- Jacob Abrams as Professor Kane (credited as Jake Abraham)
- Hattie Buskirk as Mrs. Kane
- J. Carlton Wetherby as Jerry Pitkin (credited as Jack Wetherby)
- Al Ernest Garcia as Manager of Mine (credited as Al Garcia)
- Patricia Palmer as Kate Leonard

== Preservation ==
The film is now considered lost.
