= A Guilty Conscience (1921 film) =

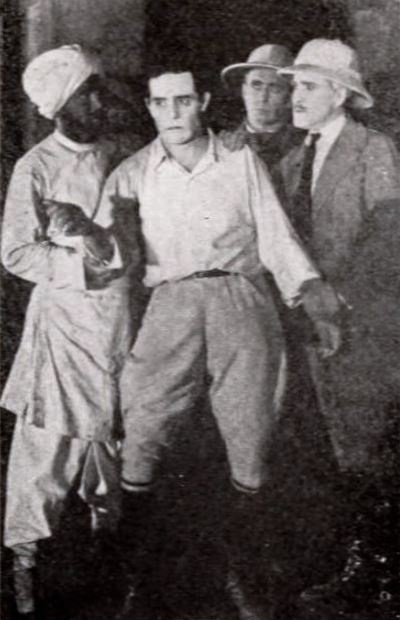
- Directed by: David Smith
- Written by: Mrs. Sidney Drew; Jay Pilcher
- Produced by: Albert E. Smith
- Starring: Antonio Moreno; Betty Francisco; Harry von Meter
- Cinematography: George Robinson
- Production company: Vitagraph Company of America
- Distributed by: Vitagraph Company of America
- Release date: November 27, 1921
- Running time: 50 minutes
- Country: United States
- Languages: Silent; English intertitles

A Guilty Conscience is a 1921 American silent drama film directed by David Smith and starring Antonio Moreno, Betty Francisco and Harry von Meter.

== Cast ==
- Antonio Moreno as Gilbert Thurstan
- Betty Francisco as Emily Thurstan
- Harry von Meter as Vincent Chalmers
- Lila Leslie as Ida Seabury
- John MacFarlane as James Roberts

== Bibliography ==
- Munden, Kenneth White. The American Film Institute Catalog of Motion Pictures Produced in the United States, Part 1. University of California Press, 1997.
