= Dead Game =

1923 film directed by Edward Sedgwick

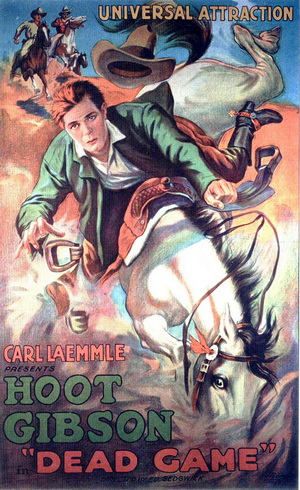
- Film poster
- Directed by: Edward Sedgwick
- Produced by: Carl Laemmle
- Starring: Hoot Gibson
- Cinematography: Charles E. Kaufman
- Release date: April 23, 1923
- Running time: 50 minutes
- Country: United States
- Languages: Silent; English intertitles

Dead Game is a 1923 American silent Western film directed by Edward Sedgwick and featuring Hoot Gibson.

== Cast ==
- Hoot Gibson as "Katy" Didd (credited as Ed "Hoot" Gibson)
- Robert McKim as Prince Tetlow
- Harry Carter as Jenks
- Laura La Plante as Alice Mason
- William Welsh as Harlu
- Tony West as Hiram
- William Steele as Sam Antone (credited as William A. Steele)
- Alfred Allen as Undetermined Role (uncredited)

== See also ==
- List of American films of 1923
- Hoot Gibson filmography
