= David Smith (director) =

English film director

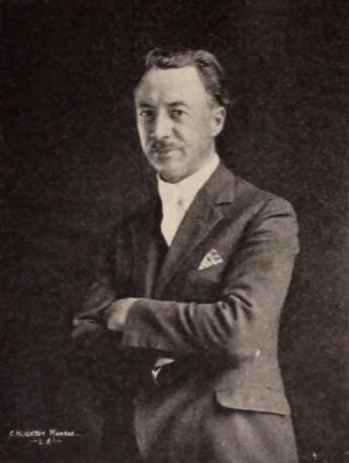
- From a 1921 magazine
- Born: 28 October 1872; Faversham, Kent
- Died: 25 April 1930 (aged 57); Santa Barbara, California
- Occupation: Film director
- Years active: 1915–1927

David Smith (28 October 1872 – 25 April 1930) was an English film director and cinematographer of the silent era. He directed more than 70 films between 1915 and 1927. He was born in Faversham, Kent, and died in Santa Barbara, California. He was the older brother of Albert E. Smith, one of the co-founders of the Vitagraph Studios.

== Selected filmography ==
- The Hiding of Black Bill (1918)
- The Woman in the Web (1918)
- Baree, Son of Kazan (1918)
- A Gentleman's Agreement (1918)
- The Changing Woman (1918)
- The Dawn of Understanding (1918)
- By the World Forgot (1918)
- The Enchanted Barn (1919)
- The Wishing Ring Man (1919)
- A Yankee Princess (1919)
- Over the Garden Wall (1919)
- Cupid Forecloses (1919)
- A Fighting Colleen (1919)
- The Little Boss (1919)
- Pegeen (1920)
- The Courage of Marge O'Doone (1920)
- Black Beauty (1921)
- It Can Be Done (1921)
- The Silver Car (1921)
- A Guilty Conscience (1921)
- Flower of the North (1921)
- The Little Minister (1922)
- My Wild Irish Rose (1922)
- The Angel of Crooked Street (1922)
- A Girl's Desire (1922)
- Little Wildcat (1922)
- The Ninety and Nine (1922)
- The Man from Brodney's (1923)
- Masters of Men (1923)
- Pioneer Trails (1923)
- The Midnight Alarm (1923)
- My Man (1924)
- Borrowed Husbands (1924)
- Code of the Wilderness (1924)
- Captain Blood (1924)
- Baree, Son of Kazan (1925)
- Steele of the Royal Mounted (1925)
- Pampered Youth (1925)
- Born to Battle (1926) (cinematography)
- The Heart of the Yukon (1927) (cinematography)
- Born to Battle (1927) (cinematography)
- Gold from Weepah (1927) (cinematography)
- The Avenging Shadow (1928) (cinematography)
