= Easy Money (1925 film) =

1925 film directed by Albert S. Rogell

- Directed by: Albert S. Rogell
- Written by: Marion Jackson (scenario)
- Story by: Sam Mintz
- Produced by: Harry Joe Brown; W. Ray Johnston
- Starring: Cullen Landis; Mildred Harris
- Cinematography: Ross Fisher
- Distributed by: Rayart Pictures
- Release date: January 1, 1925
- Running time: 6 reels
- Country: United States
- Language: Silent (English intertitles)

Easy Money is a 1925 silent film directed by Albert S. Rogell and starring Cullen Landis and Mildred Harris.

A copy of the film is preserved at the Library of Congress.

== Cast ==
- Cullen Landis – Bud Parsons
- Mildred Harris – Blanche Amory
- Mary Carr – Mrs. Hale
- Crauford Kent – Lewis
- Gertrude Astor – Ellen Hale
- Rex Lease – Red
- David Kirby – William Hale
