= The Midnight Alarm =

1923 film

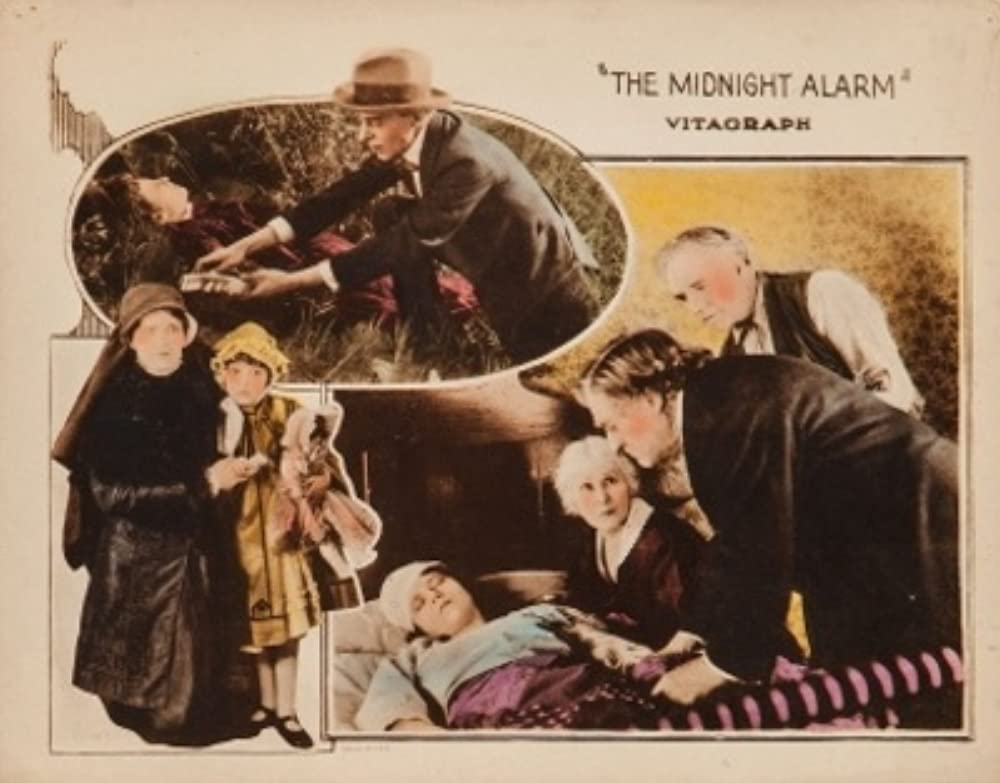
- Lobby card
- Directed by: David Smith
- Written by: James W. Harkins Jr. (play); C. Graham Baker
- Produced by: Albert E. Smith
- Starring: Alice Calhoun; Percy Marmont; Cullen Landis
- Cinematography: W. Steve Smith Jr.
- Production company: Vitagraph Company of America
- Distributed by: Vitagraph Company of America
- Release date: August 19, 1923
- Running time: 7 reels
- Country: United States
- Language: Silent (English intertitles)

The Midnight Alarm is a 1923 American silent drama film directed by David Smith and starring Alice Calhoun, Percy Marmont, and Cullen Landis.

== Plot ==
As described in a film magazine review, through some peculiar circumstances, Sparkle Carrington becomes a penniless orphan and, while her grandparents search for her, she and another waif run a newsstand together. A young crook who loves her and knows of her connections plans to destroy the papers which will identify her, marry her, and get the money. Trapped in a burning building with him, she is rescued by a fire captain who loves her, is restored to her grandparents, and marries the captain.

== Cast ==
- Alice Calhoun as Sparkle / Mrs. Thornton
- Percy Marmont as Captain Harry Westmore
- Cullen Landis as Chaser
- Joseph Kilgour as Silas Carrington
- Maxine Elliott Hicks as Aggie
- George C. Pearce as Mr. Tilwell
- Kitty Bradbury as Mrs. Tilwell
- J. Gunnis Davis as Springer
- Jeanne Carpenter as Susan
- May Foster as Mrs. Berg
- Fred Behrle as Bill
