= Kentucky Handicap =

1926 film by Harry Joe Brown

- Directed by: Harry Joe Brown
- Written by: Henry Roberts Symonds
- Produced by: Harry Joe Brown; W. Ray Johnston
- Starring: Reed Howes; Alice Calhoun; Robert McKim
- Production company: Harry J. Brown Productions
- Distributed by: Rayart Pictures; Butcher's Film Service (UK)
- Release date: October 4, 1926
- Country: United States
- Languages: Silent; English intertitles

Kentucky Handicap is a 1926 American silent action film directed by Harry Joe Brown and starring Reed Howes, Alice Calhoun and Robert McKim. It is also known by the alternative title Kentucky Luck.

== Cast ==
- Reed Howes
- Alice Calhoun
- Robert McKim
- Lydia Knott
- Josef Swickard
- James Bradbury Jr.

== Preservation ==
The film is preserved in the Library of Congress and UCLA Film/Television collections.

== Bibliography ==
- Munden, Kenneth White. The American Film Institute Catalog of Motion Pictures Produced in the United States, Part 1. University of California Press, 1997.
