= Peggy Puts It Over =

1921 film

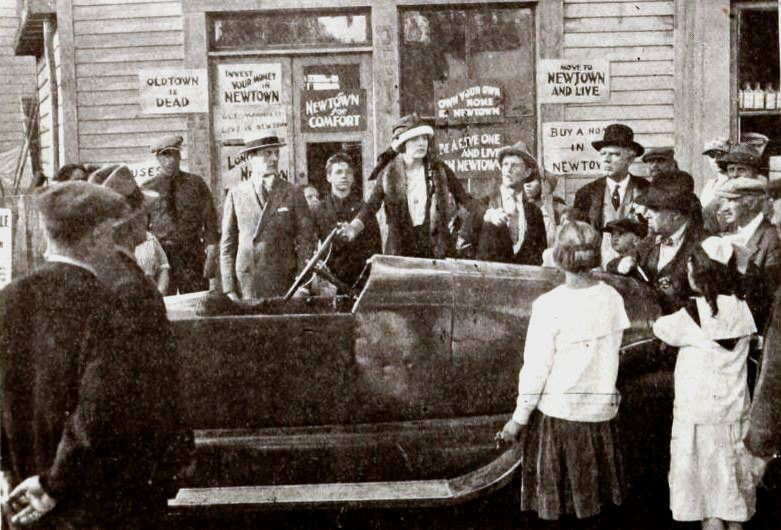
- Directed by: Gustav von Seyffertitz
- Written by: C. Graham Baker; G. Burr-Lynner; Harry Dittmar
- Starring: Alice Calhoun; Edward Langford; Leslie Stowe
- Cinematography: Vincent Scully; King D. Gray
- Production company: Vitagraph Company of America
- Distributed by: Vitagraph Company of America
- Release date: August 1921
- Running time: 50 minutes
- Country: United States
- Languages: Silent; English intertitles

Peggy Puts It Over is a 1921 American silent comedy drama film directed by Gustav von Seyffertitz and starring Alice Calhoun, Edward Langford and Leslie Stowe.

== Plot ==
Returning from college with a degree in civil engineering Peggy Conrow proposes to redevelop her father's ramshackle estate into a new town for the benefit of the locals, but is opposed by conservative views.

== Cast ==
- Alice Calhoun as Peggy Conrow
- Edward Langford as Dr. David Ransome
- Leslie Stowe as Silas Tucker
- Charles Mackay as Maxfield Conrow
- Helen Lindroth as Aunt Agatha
- Cornelius MacSunday as Constable
- Dick Lee as Rusty

== Bibliography ==
- Connelly, Robert B. The Silents: Silent Feature Films, 1910-36, Volume 40, Issue 2. December Press, 1998.
- Munden, Kenneth White. The American Film Institute Catalog of Motion Pictures Produced in the United States, Part 1. University of California Press, 1997.
