= The Man from Brodney's =

1923 film

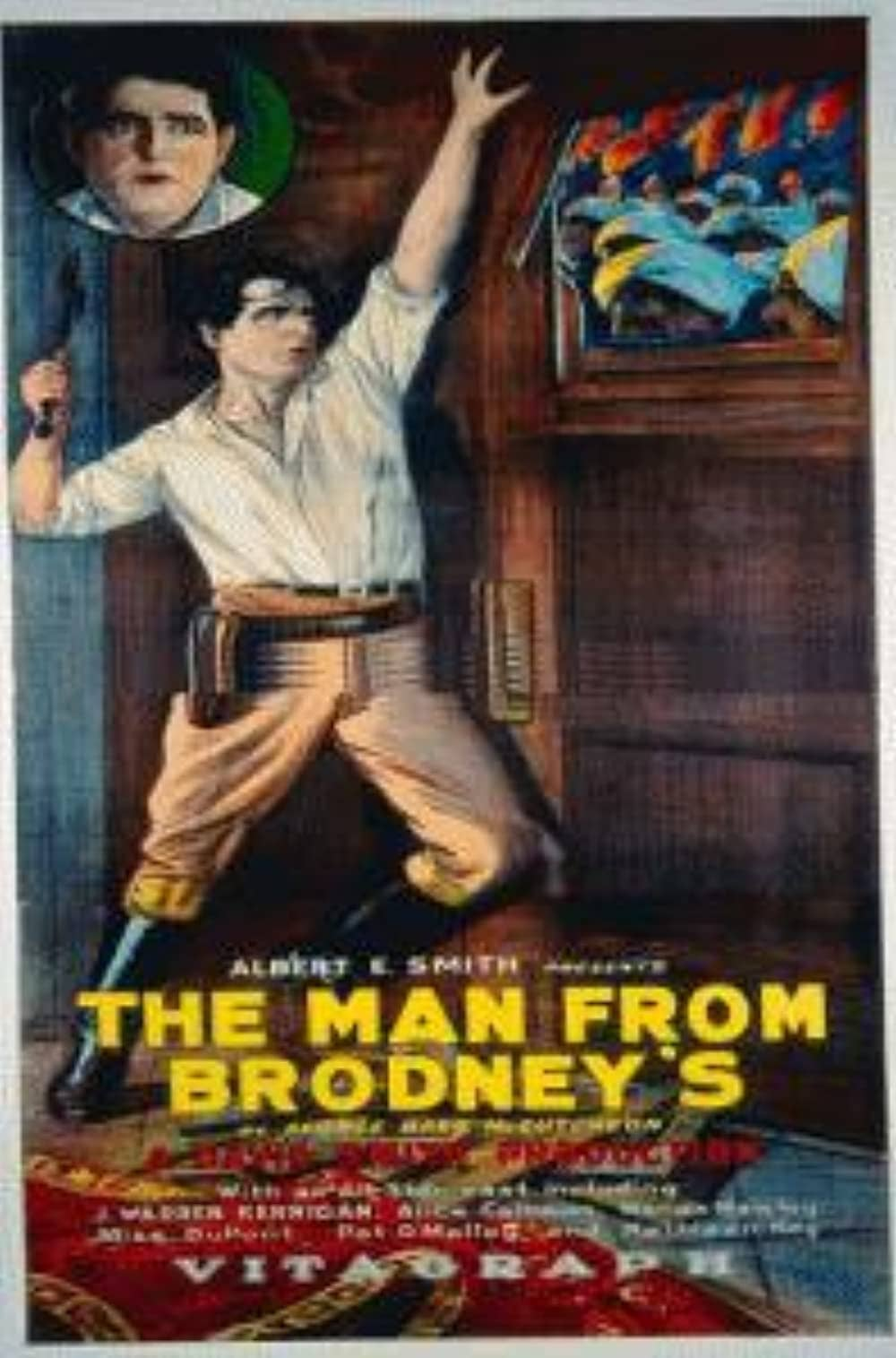
- Film poster
- Directed by: David Smith
- Written by: C. Graham Baker
- Based on: The Man from Brodney's by George Barr McCutcheon
- Produced by: Albert E. Smith
- Starring: J. Warren Kerrigan
- Production company: Vitagraph Company of America
- Distributed by: Vitagraph Company of America
- Release date: December 16, 1923 (New York City premiere)
- Running time: 80 minutes
- Country: United States
- Language: Silent (English intertitles)

The Man from Brodney's is a 1923 American silent drama film directed by David Smith and starring J. Warren Kerrigan, Alice Calhoun, and Wanda Hawley. It was produced and released by the Vitagraph Company of America.

== Plot ==
As described in a film magazine, the law firm of Brodney and Company sends Hollingsworth Chase, an American, to the Island of Japat in the South Seas to represent the natives in a strange lawsuit. The Island of Japat, which has jewel mines of great value, is to go the grandchildren of its owners, provided that they marry within six months of the filing of the will. If the grandchildren fail to comply with the terms of the will, the Island will revert to the natives that live there. The natives, under the leadership of Rasula, make desperate attempts to bring about the deaths of the heirs. Chase joins forces against them. The infuriated natives make a mass attack on the mine operators and heirs, resulting in a terrific struggle. Just when it becomes impossible for the small group of men to hold out any longer, a United States destroyer comes to their aid. Rasula is killed, and the natives agree to a compromise under which the heirs agree to pay the government a fair royalty for the output of the mines. Princess Genevra, a European princess who had been visiting the Island of Japat for a rest, confesses to Chase that her love for him is greater than her love for any power, and that she intends to sacrifice her throne for him.

== Cast ==
- J. Warren Kerrigan as Hollingsworth Chase
- Alice Calhoun as Princess Genevra
- Wanda Hawley as Lady Agnes Deppingham
- Miss DuPont as Mrs. Browne
- Pat O'Malley as Robert Browne
- Kathleen Key as Neenah
- Bertram Grassby as Rasula
- Glen Cavender as Selim

== Production ==
While the film was primarily shot at the Vitagraph Studio, two Destroyers were rented out to the film production for use in the picture, with several scenes being taken onboard the ships in addition to their exteriors. Production was delayed by a storm.

== Reception ==
The Man from Brodney was received positively upon release. In a review written by Michael L. Simmons for Exhibitor's Trade Review, he described the production as a "spectacular adventure" and "clean, wholesome entertainment." Mary Kelly of Moving Picture World was very positive about the production and called it "deeply impressive."

== Preservation ==
The film survives incomplete or abridged by a collector.
