= A Girl's Desire =

1922 film

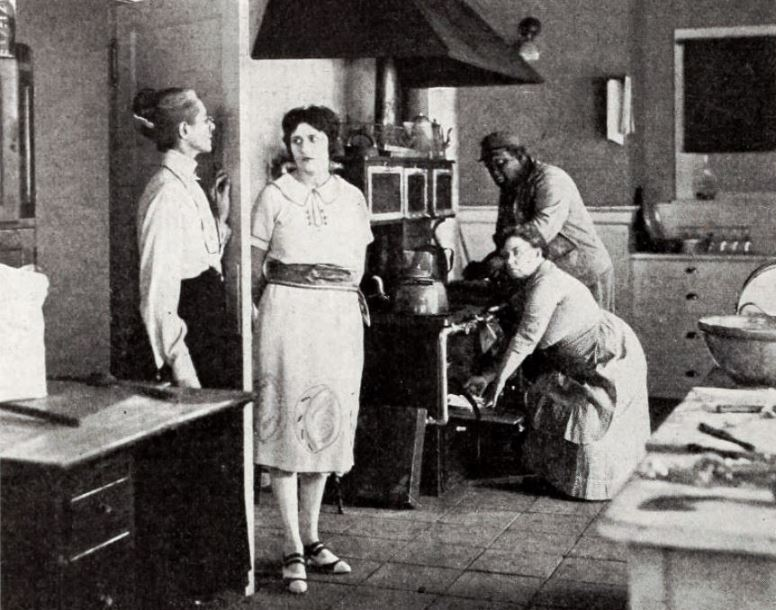
- Directed by: David Smith
- Written by: J. Raleigh Davies
- Starring: Alice Calhoun; Warner Baxter; Frank Hall Crane
- Cinematography: W. Steve Smith Jr.
- Production company: Vitagraph Company of America
- Distributed by: Vitagraph Company of America
- Release date: September 10, 1922
- Running time: 50 minutes
- Country: United States
- Languages: Silent; English intertitles

A Girl's Desire is a 1922 American silent comedy film directed by David Smith and starring Alice Calhoun, Warner Baxter and Frank Hall Crane.

== Plot ==
A wealthy and socially ambitious American woman plans to buy social position by acquiring some heirlooms and an elaborate family tree. This leads on to a potential marriage between the American's daughter Elizabeth and Lady Dysart's son Cecil, only for the real Lord Dysart to appear disguised as a journalist.

== Cast ==
- Alice Calhoun as Elizabeth Browne
- Warner Baxter as Jones / Lord Dysart
- Frank Hall Crane as 'Lord' Cecil Dysart
- Lillian Lawrence as Lady Dysart
- Victory Bateman as Mrs. Browne
- James Donnelly as H. Jerome Browne
- Sadie Gordon as Miss Grygges
- Charles Dudley as Perkins
- Lydia Yeamans Titus as Cook
- Harry Pringle as Solicitor

== Bibliography ==
- Connelly, Robert B. The Silents: Silent Feature Films, 1910–36, Volume 40, Issue 2. December Press, 1998.
- Munden, Kenneth White. The American Film Institute Catalog of Motion Pictures Produced in the United States, Part 1. University of California Press, 1997.
