= Little Wildcat =

1922 film

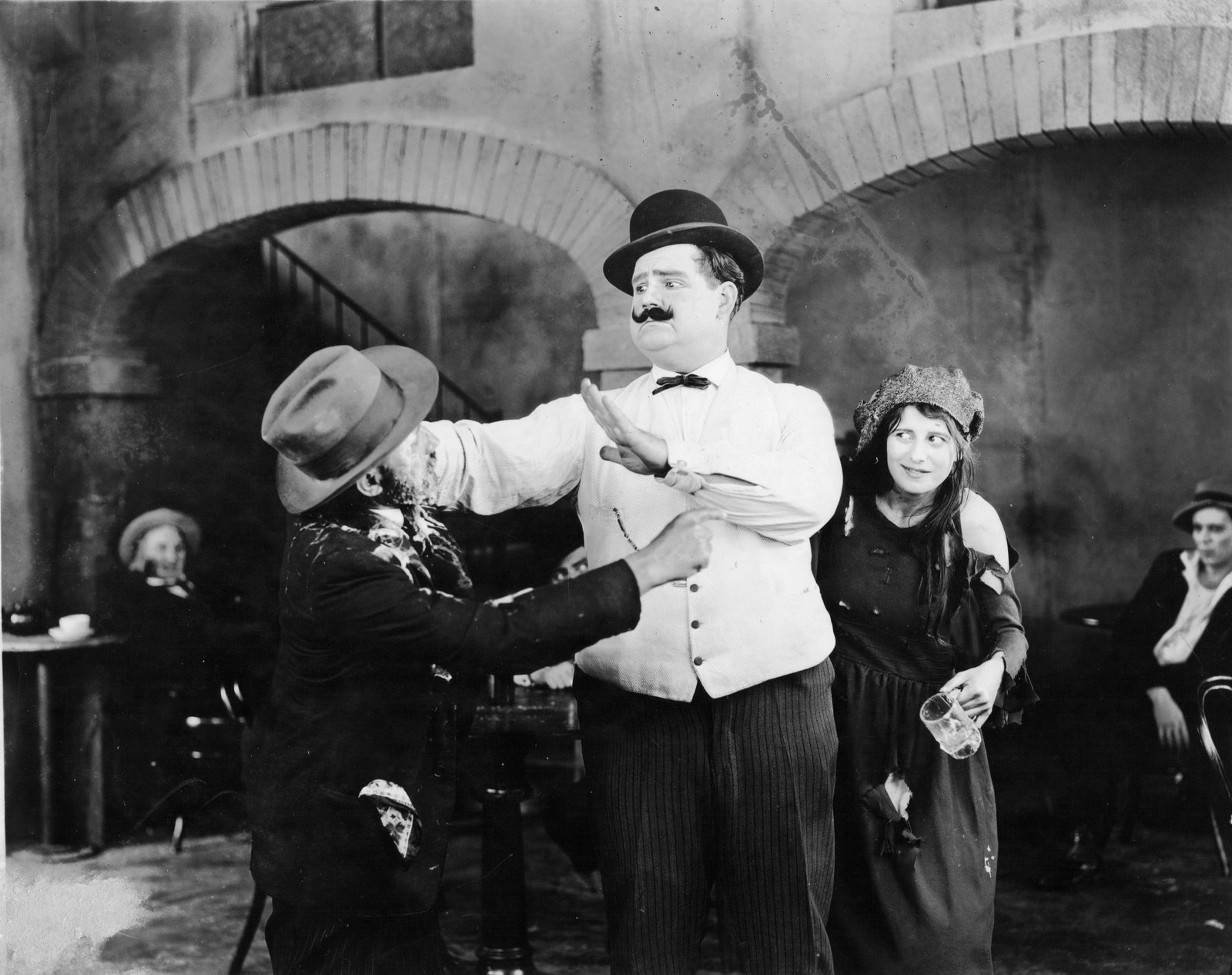
- Oliver Hardy (center) and Alice Calhoun (right) in a promotional still from Little Wildcat
- Directed by: David Smith
- Written by: Bradley J. Smollen; Gene Wright
- Starring: Alice Calhoun; Oliver Hardy
- Cinematography: W. Steve Smith Jr.
- Production company: Vitagraph Company of America
- Distributed by: Vitagraph Company of America
- Release date: November 12, 1922
- Running time: 5 reels
- Country: United States
- Language: Silent with English intertitles

Little Wildcat is a 1922 American silent comedy film featuring Oliver Hardy.

== Plot ==
According to the film magazine, "Mag o' the Alley, known as "litle wildcat,” [sic] lands in court one day after stealing a watch and fighting with every man in sight. Robert Ware, a friend of Judge Arnold, is anxious to give her a chance to reform. Despite the judge’s ideas, he takes her into his home and tries to bring her up to be a lady. Four years later, Arnold is wounded at the front and lands on the German side. He is brought back to life by a wonderful nurse who never tells him her name. When he comes back to the United States he meets her again at Robert Ware’s home and learns that his nurse was the same girl he had given up as hopeless. He finds that she has overheard him tell of his love for her and makes him completely happy by accepting him."

== Cast ==
- Alice Calhoun as Mag o' the Alley
- Ramsey Wallace as Judge Arnold
- Herbert Fortier as Robert Ware
- Oliver Hardy as 'Bull' Mulligan
- Adele Farrington as Mrs. Wilding
- Arthur Hoyt as Mr. Wilding
- Frank Hall Crane as Jack Wilding (as Frank Crane)
- Jim Farley as Pete (as James Farley)
- Henry Hebert as Captain Carl Herman
- Maude Emory as Babette (as Maud Emery)

== See also ==
- List of American films of 1922
- Oliver Hardy filmography
