= The Matrimonial Web =

1921 film

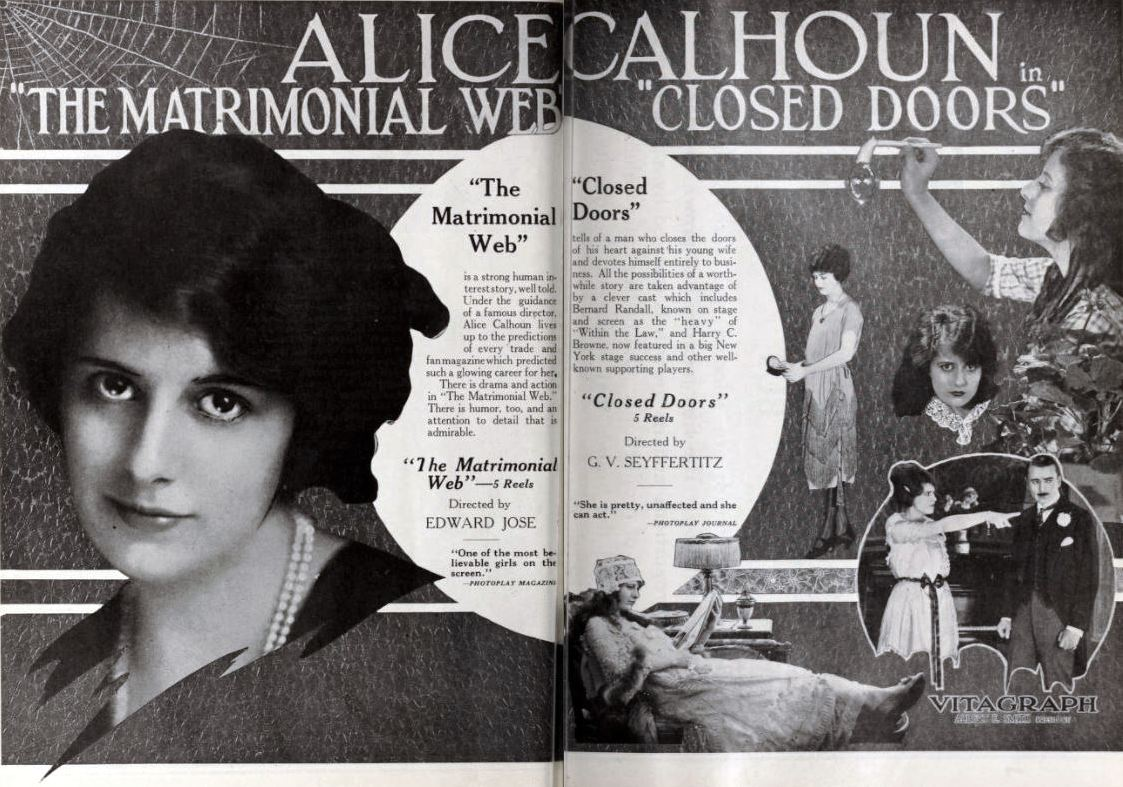
- Directed by: Edward José
- Written by: C. Graham Baker
- Starring: Alice Calhoun; Joseph Striker; Riley Hatch
- Production company: Vitagraph Company of America
- Distributed by: Vitagraph Company of America
- Release date: October 2, 1921
- Running time: 52 minutes
- Country: United States
- Languages: Silent; English intertitles

The Matrimonial Web is a 1921 American silent crime drama film directed by Edward José and starring Alice Calhoun, Joseph Striker and Riley Hatch.

== Cast ==
- Alice Calhoun as Helen Anderson
- Joseph Striker as Harvey Blake
- Riley Hatch as Revenue Officer Anderson
- Armand Cortes as Gregory
- Charles Mackay as Cyrus Blake
- Elsie Fuller as Miriam Blake
- Ernest Hilliard as Irving Sneed
- Marion Barney as Mrs. Sanborn
- Edith Stockton as Dorothy Sanborn
- G.C. Frye as Judge Cameron
- Dick Lee as Smuggler

== Bibliography ==
- Connelly, Robert B. The Silents: Silent Feature Films, 1910-36, Volume 40, Issue 2. December Press, 1998.
- Munden, Kenneth White. The American Film Institute Catalog of Motion Pictures Produced in the United States, Part 1. University of California Press, 1997.
