= Masters of Men =

1923 film

- Directed by: David Smith
- Written by: C. Graham Baker
- Based on: Masters of Men by Morgan Robertson
- Produced by: Albert E. Smith
- Starring: Earle Williams; Alice Calhoun; Wanda Hawley
- Cinematography: W. Steve Smith Jr.
- Production company: Vitagraph Company of America
- Distributed by: Vitagraph Company of America
- Release date: May 14, 1923
- Running time: 70 minutes
- Country: United States
- Languages: Silent; English intertitles

Masters of Men is a 1923 American silent war drama film directed by David Smith and starring Earle Williams, Alice Calhoun and Wanda Hawley. It takes place against the backdrop of the 1898 Spanish-American War. It is based on the 1901 novel Masters of Men by Morgan Robertson.

== Plot ==
After falsely being accused of theft really committed by his sweetheart Mabel 's brother, Dick Halpin runs away to join the Navy. Later shanghaied he is held prisoner by the Spanish in Santiago Harbor, escaping just in time to rejoin his ship and take part in the Spanish-American War. Returning home a hero after a sea battle, his name is cleared and he reconciles with Mabel.

== Cast ==
- Earle Williams as Lt. Breen
- Alice Calhoun as Mabel Arthur
- Cullen Landis as Dick Halpin
- Wanda Hawley as Bessie Fleming
- Dick Sutherland as 'Pig' Jones
- Charles Mason as Sawyer
- Bert Appling as Mr. Thorpe
- Jack Curtis as Capt. Bilker
- Martin Turner as 'Nigger'

== Bibliography ==
- Connelly, Robert B. (1998). The Silents: Silent Feature Films, 1910-36. Vol. 40 (2nd ed.). December Press. ISBN 0913204366.
