= Elwood Thomas Baker =

Inventor of Gin rummy (1854–1938)

Elwood Thomas Baker (1854 – November 21, 1938) was a whist teacher in Brooklyn, New York. He and his son, Charles Graham Baker, invented Gin rummy in 1909.

On November 21, 1938, Baker died at the Grand Central Parkway Rest Home, Jamaica, Queens.
