= The Man Next Door (1923 film) =

1923 film by Victor Schertzinger

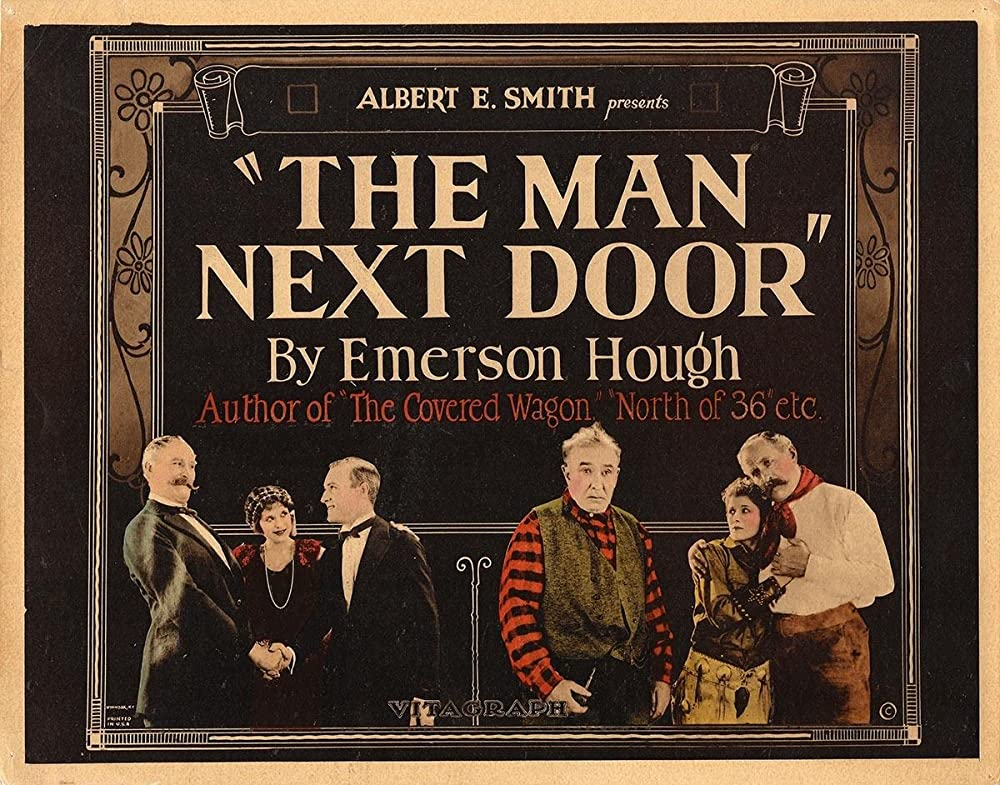
- Lantern slide
- Directed by: Victor Schertzinger
- Written by: C. Graham Baker
- Produced by: Albert E. Smith
- Starring: David Torrence; Frank Sheridan; James W. Morrison
- Cinematography: W. Steve Smith Jr
- Production company: Vitagraph Company of America
- Distributed by: Vitagraph Company of America
- Release date: May 28, 1923
- Running time: 70 minutes
- Country: United States
- Language: Silent (English intertitles)

The Man Next Door is a 1923 American silent comedy-drama film directed by Victor Schertzinger and starring David Torrence, Frank Sheridan, and James W. Morrison.

== Cast ==
- David Torrence as Colonel Wright
- Frank Sheridan as Curley
- James W. Morrison as Jimmy
- Alice Calhoun as Bonnie Bell
- John Steppling as David Wisner
- Adele Farrington as Mrs. Wisner
- Mary Culver as Catherine Kimberly
- Bruce Boteler as Tom Kimberly

== Production ==
The Man Next Door was partially filmed on location near Victorville, California.

== Bibliography ==
- James Robert Parish & Michael R. Pitts. Film Directors: a Guide to their American Films. Scarecrow Press, 1974.
