= Alice Calhoun =

American actress (1900–1966)

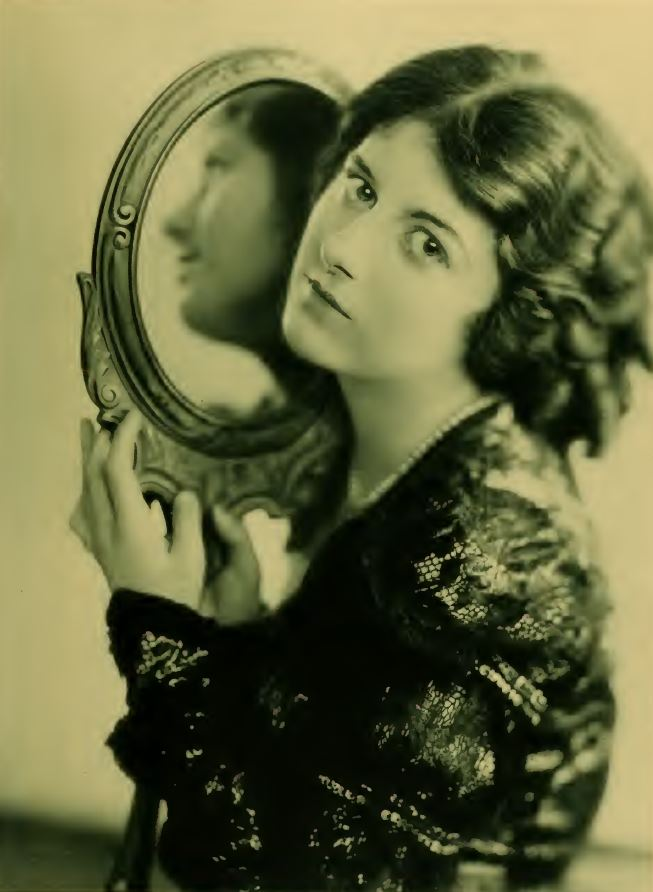
- Calhoun, 1921
- Born: November 21, 1900; Cleveland, Ohio, U.S.
- Died: June 3, 1966 (aged 65); Los Angeles, California, U.S.
- Occupation: Film actress
- Years active: 1918–1934
- Spouse(s): Mendel B. Silverburg (m. 1926; div. 1926) Max Chotiner (m. 1926; div. 1938) Max Chotiner (m. 1948)

Alice Beatrice Calhoun (November 21, 1900 – June 3, 1966) was an American silent film actress.

== Film star ==
Born in Cleveland, Ohio, she made her film debut in an uncredited role in 1918 and went on to appear in another forty-seven films between then and 1929. As a star with Vitagraph in New York City, she moved with the company when it relocated to Hollywood. In the comedy, The Man Next Door (1923), Calhoun plays Bonnie Bell. A critic complimented her on being pretty and playing her role successfully. The Man from Brodney's (1923) is a movie which displays the fencing talent of actor J. Warren Kerrigan. Directed by David Smith for Vitagraph, the film is based on a novel by George Barr McCutcheon. Calhoun plays Princess Genevra. Between Friends (1924) is a motion picture adapted from a story by Robert W. Chambers. Anna Q. Nilsson and Norman Kerry are part of a cast in which Calhoun plays an artist's model. Among her other movies titles are Pampered Youth (1925), The Power of the Weak (1926), and Savage Passions (1927).

She made her Talkie debut in the 1929 Part Talkie Bride of the Desert (1929). Her second performance in a talkie came in an uncredited role in 1934.

== Marriages ==
Her first husband was Mendel Silberberg, a Los Angeles, California attorney. They were married in May 1926 and he filed a divorce petition in July. Silberberg charged that Calhoun was engaged to another man at the time of their wedding. Their marriage was annulled.

In 1925 Calhoun had invested in a movie theater. With her second husband Max Chotiner, whom she married secretly in Ventura, California on December 28, 1926, she became owner of a chain of theatres in the Los Angeles area. Highly successful, Calhoun and her husband were benefactors of a number of local charities. Chotiner later became an investment broker. They divorced in 1938, but ultimately reconciled, remarrying in 1948.

== Death ==
Calhoun died in Los Angeles in 1966 of cancer, aged 65. She is interred with her husband in the Forest Lawn Memorial Park Cemetery in Glendale, California.

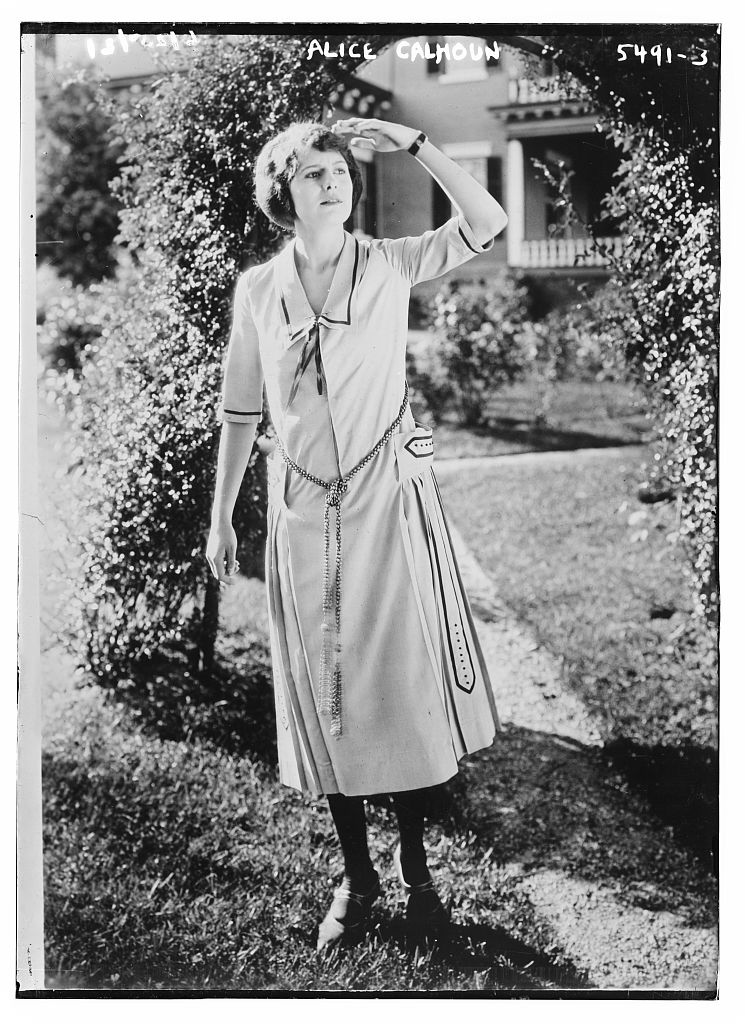
Alice Calhoun, c. 1920-1925

For her contributions to the film industry, Calhoun was inducted into the Hollywood Walk of Fame with a motion pictures star located at 6815 Hollywood Boulevard.

== Filmography ==
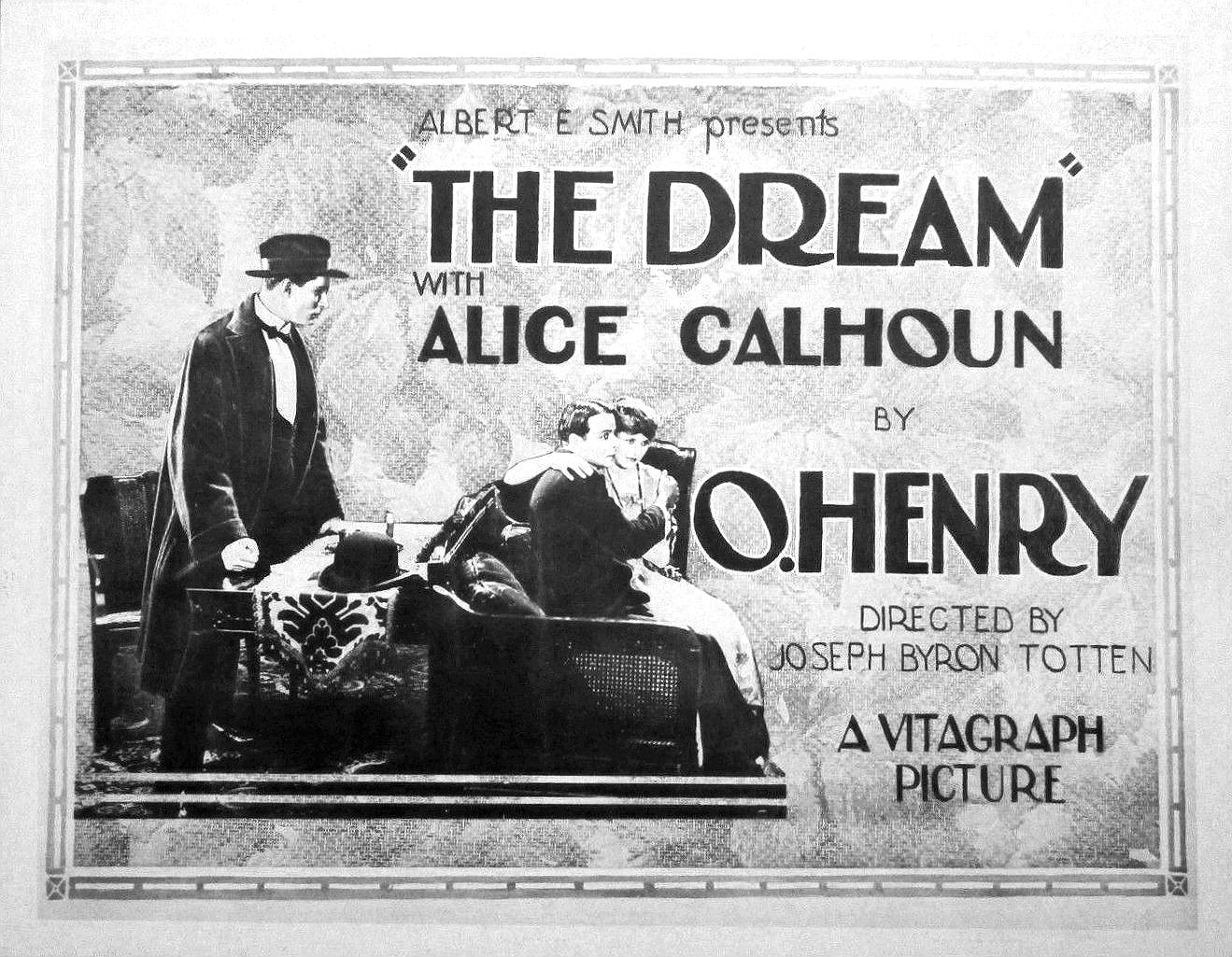

- Everybody's Business (1919)
- Deadline at Eleven (1920)
- Captain Swift (1920)
- Human Collateral (1920)
- The Sea Rider (1920)
- The Dream (1920)
- Princess Jones (1921)
- The Matrimonial Web (1921)
- The Charming Deceiver (1921)
- Closed Doors (1921)
- Rainbow (1921)
- Peggy Puts It Over (1921)
- The Angel of Crooked Street (1922)
- The Girl in His Room (1922)
- A Girl's Desire (1922)
- The Little Minister (1922)
- Little Wildcat (1922)
- The Man from Brodney's (1923)
- The Man Next Door (1923)
- The Midnight Alarm (1923)
- Masters of Men (1923)
- Pioneer Trails (1923)
- One Stolen Night (1923)
- Between Friends (1924)
- Flowing Gold (1924)
- Code of the Wilderness (1924)
- The Happy Warrior (1925)
- The Everlasting Whisper (1925)
- The Part Time Wife (1925)
- The Other Woman's Story (1925)
- Pampered Youth (1925)
- The Man on the Box (1925)
- A Hero of the Big Snows (1926)
- Flying High (1926)
- Tentacles of the North (1926)
- The Trunk Mystery (1926)
- The Power of the Weak (1926)
- Kentucky Handicap (1926)
- The Down Grade (1927)
- Hidden Aces (1927)
- The Isle of Forgotten Women (1927)
- The Flag (1927)
- In the First Degree (1927)
- Bride of the Desert (1929)
- Now I'll Tell (1934)
