= C. Graham Baker =

American screenwriter

Charles Graham Baker
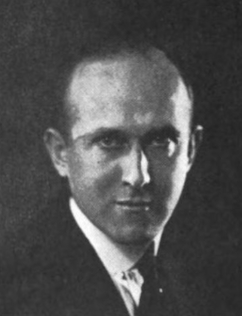
- Born: July 16, 1883; Evansville, Indiana, U.S.
- Died: May 15, 1950 (aged 66); Reseda, Los Angeles, California, U.S.
- Years active: 1915–1948

Charles Graham Baker (July 16, 1883 – May 15, 1950) was an American screenwriter and director. He wrote for more than 170 films between 1915 and 1948.

== Biography ==
He was born in Evansville, Indiana on July 16, 1883, to Elwood T. Baker and Leslie S. Barrows. He and his father invented the game of Gin rummy in 1909. By 1918 he was working as a "playwright" for Vitagraph Studios in Brooklyn, New York City.

Baker died in Reseda, Los Angeles, California on May 15, 1950 (aged 66).

== Partial filmography ==
- The Flaming Omen (1917)
- The Grell Mystery (1917)
- Love Watches (1918)
- Frauds and Frenzies (1918)
- The Fortune Hunter (1920)
- The Vice of Fools (1920)
- The Whisper Market (1920)
- The Inner Chamber (1921)
- The Single Track (1921)
- No Defense (1921)
- What's Your Reputation Worth? (1921)
- The Scarab Ring (1921)
- Peggy Puts It Over (1921)
- It Isn't Being Done This Season (1921)
- The Matrimonial Web (1921)
- Fortune's Mask (1922)
- The Angel of Crooked Street (1922)
- The Girl in His Room (1922)
- The Man from Brodney's (1923)
- The Midnight Alarm (1923)
- Pioneer Trails (1923)
- Masters of Men (1923)
- Playing It Wild (1923)
- The Man Next Door (1923)
- The Girl in the Limousine (1924)
- The Beautiful City (1925)
- Just Suppose (1926)
- The Third Degree (1926)
- The Girl from Chicago (1927)
- The Singing Fool (1928)
- Fancy Baggage (1929)
- Sonny Boy (1930)
- Broadway Through a Keyhole (1933)
- She Couldn't Take It (1935)
- Shanghai (1935)
- Mary Burns, Fugitive (1935)
- The Girl Friend (1935)
- You Only Live Once (1937)
- Ali Baba Goes to Town (1937)
- Eternally Yours (1939)
- Danger Signal (1945)
- Ramrod (1947)
