= Pioneer Trails =

1923 film

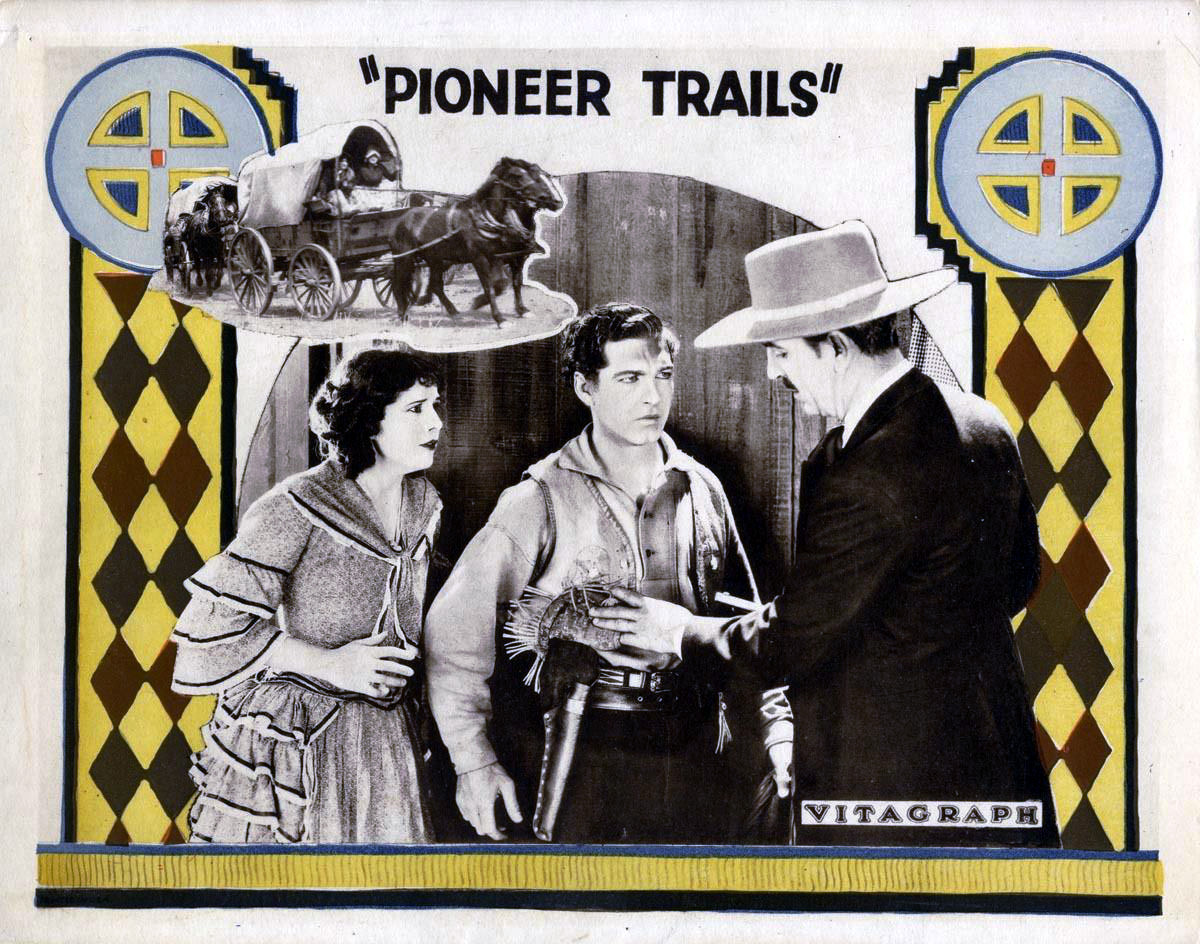
- Lobby card
- Directed by: David Smith
- Written by: C. Graham Baker
- Starring: Cullen Landis; Alice Calhoun; Bertram Grassby
- Cinematography: W. Steve Smith Jr.
- Production company: Vitagraph Company of America
- Distributed by: Vitagraph Company of America
- Release date: November 11, 1923
- Running time: 70 minutes
- Country: United States
- Language: Silent (English intertitles)

Pioneer Trails is a 1923 American silent Western film directed by David Smith and starring Cullen Landis, Alice Calhoun, and Bertram Grassby.

== Plot ==
As described in a film magazine review, the lure of gold draws Robert Dale, his wife, and their son Jack over the prairie. The party is attacked by Indians and all save Jack are killed. He is adopted by another member of his party but, being only four years old, does not know his last name. Twenty years later he finds himself in love with a young woman, but, not knowing his origin, he dares not declare his love. She finally takes the initiative in her own hands, declares herlove, and is finally accepted, peculiar circumstances having by this time established Jack's birth and origin.

== Cast ==
- Cullen Landis as Jack Dale / Jack Plains
- Alice Calhoun as Rose Miller
- Bertram Grassby as Philip Blaney
- Otis Harlan as 'Easy Aaron' Cropsey
- T.D. Crittenden as Rodney Miller
- Virginia True Boardman as Mrs. Salter
- Aggie Herring as 'Laundry Lou'
- Nelson McDowell as Parson
- Joe Rickson as The Sheriff

== Bibliography ==
- Munden, Kenneth White (1997) [1971]. The American Film Institute Catalog of Motion Pictures Produced in the United States, Part 1. University of California Press. p. 709. ISBN 0520209699.
