= Cullen Landis =

American actor and film director (1896–1975)

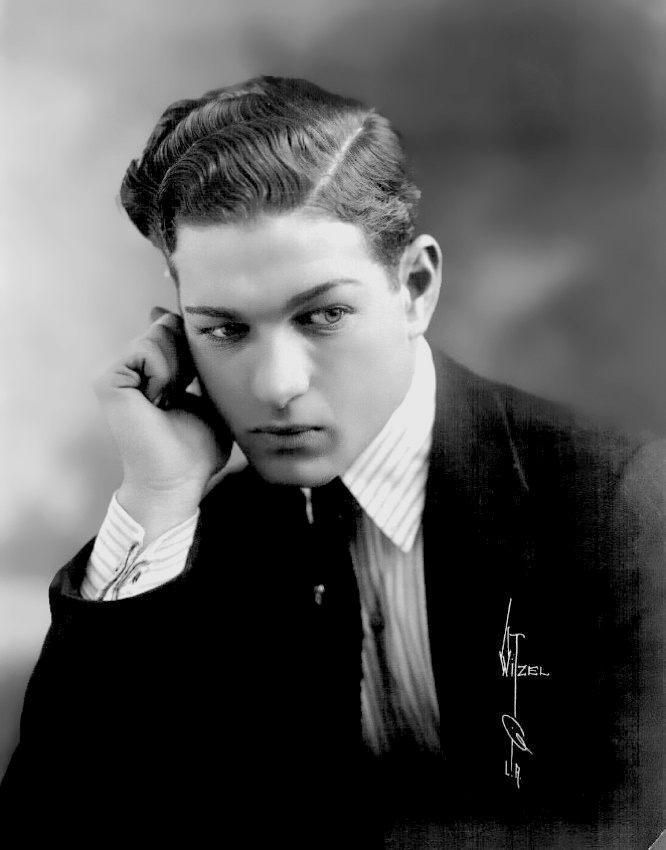
- Landis c. 1922
- Born: James Cullen Landis; July 9, 1896; Nashville, Tennessee, U.S.
- Died: August 26, 1975 (aged 79); Bloomfield Hills, Michigan, U.S.
- Resting place: Maple Grove Cemetery, Cheboygan, Michigan, U.S.
- Other name: J. Cullen Landis
- Occupations: Actor; director
- Years active: 1916–1939
- Spouses: Mignon Le Brun (m. 1918; div. 1921) Jane Grenier (m. 1931; died 1975)
- Children: 2
- Relatives: Margaret Landis (sister)

James Cullen Landis (July 9, 1896 – August 26, 1975) was an American motion picture actor and director whose career began in the early years of the silent film era.

== Biography ==
James Cullen Landis was the middle of three siblings (two sons and a daughter) raised by Lulan and Margaret (née Cullen) Landis in Nashville, Tennessee, where his father supported his family as a stockbroker. As a boy, James was a train enthusiast and dreamed of being a railroad engineer. Though the ambition eventually faded, his interest in railroads did not, and some years later he helped design for himself a model train set powered by steam.

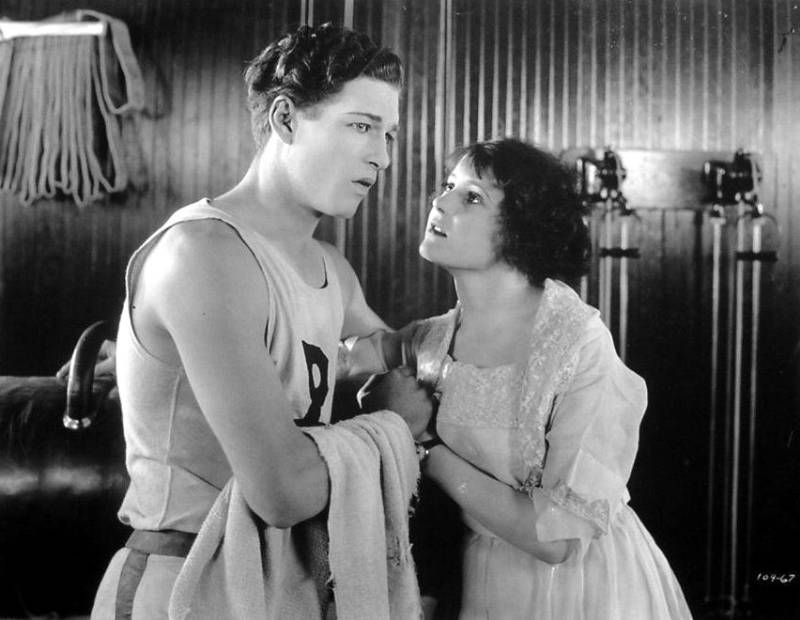
Landis with Clara Horton in It's a Great Life (1920)

Cullen began working in the fledgling film industry at age 18 around the time his older sister, Margaret Landis, appeared in her first film.

Landis began as a movie director, only turning to acting after his lead player broke a leg and it was discovered that the actor’s costumes fit him.

He went on to become one of the more popular lead actors of the silent era, appearing in some one hundred films over 14 years.

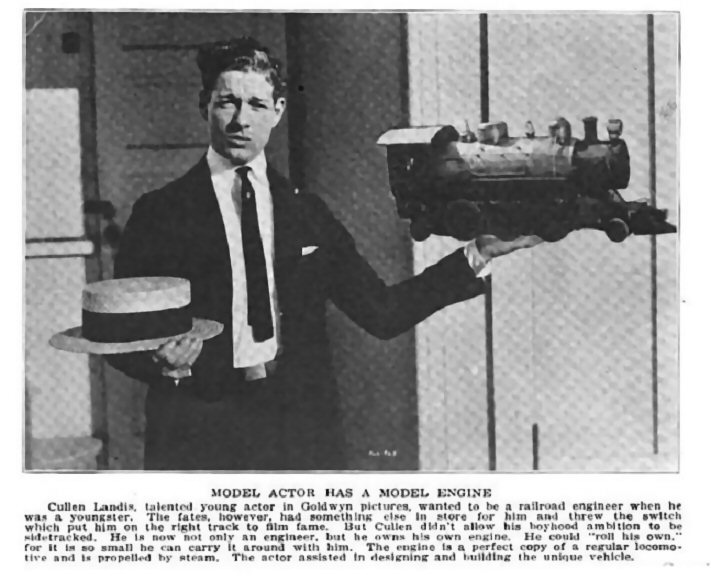
Landis with his model train locomotive, ca. 1920

In 1928 Cullen Landis starred in the first 'all talking' motion picture, Lights of New York. He confided in a friend that talkies were perfect for musicals and that he was no "song and dance man". His final film was The Convict's Code (1930). He left Hollywood for Detroit in 1930 to produce and direct industrial films for automobile companies. In 1937 he joined the directorial staff of the Jam Handy Picture Service, where he finished his professional career.

== World War II ==
During World War II, he served as a captain with US Army Signal Corps producing training films in the South Pacific. By war’s end he was twice decorated and promoted to major. In the postwar years he made documentaries for the US State Department that took him to the far corners of the world. He later directed industrial films for the Jam Handy Corporation.

== Death ==
James Cullen Landis died on August 28, 1975, aged 79, at a nursing home in Bloomfield, Michigan, three months after the death of his wife, Jane (née Greiner).

== Selected filmography ==
- Joy and the Dragon (1916) (as J. Cullen Landis)
- The Outcasts of Poker Flat (1919)
- Where the West Begins (1919)
- Almost a Husband (1919)
- Upstairs (1919)
- Jinx (1919)
- Pinto (1920)
- Going Some (1920)
- Bunty Pulls the Strings (1921)
- The Infamous Miss Revell (1921)
- The Ace of Hearts (1921)
- Voices of the City (1921)
- The Old Nest (1921) as Jim at 22-32
- Watch Your Step (1922)
- Remembrance (1922)
- Youth to Youth (1922)
- Gay and Devilish (1922)
- Love in the Dark (1922)
- The Famous Mrs. Fair (1923)
- Masters of Men (1923)
- Dollar Devils (1923)
- The Midnight Alarm (1923)
- Soul of the Beast (1923)
- Pioneer Trails (1923)
- The Man Life Passed By (1923)
- Crashin' Thru (1923)
- One Law for the Woman (1924)
- The Fighting Coward (1924)
- Born Rich (1924)
- A Broadway Butterfly (1925)
- Sealed Lips (1925)
- Peacock Feathers (1925)
- The Mansion of Aching Hearts (1925)
- Easy Money (1925)
- An Enemy Of Men (1925)
- Wasted Lives (1925)
- Pampered Youth (1925)
- The Midnight Flyer (1925)
- Frenzied Flames (1926)
- The Smoke Eaters (1926)
- Then Came the Woman (1926)
- Winning the Futurity (1926)
- With Davy Crockett at the Fall of the Alamo (1926)
- With Buffalo Bill on the U. P. Trail (1926)
- My Old Dutch (1926)
- Christine of the Big Tops (1926)
- Sweet Rosie O'Grady (1926)
- On Guard (1927)
- Finnegan's Ball (1927)
- The Crimson Flash (1927)
- Broadway After Midnight (1927)
- The Devil's Skipper (1928)
- Out with the Tide (1928)
- The Broken Mask (1928)
- The Midnight Adventure (1928)
- On to Reno (1928)
- Lights of New York (1928)
- The Little Wild Girl (1928)
- The Convict's Code (1930)
