= Albert E. Smith (producer) =

English film director and producer (1875–1958)

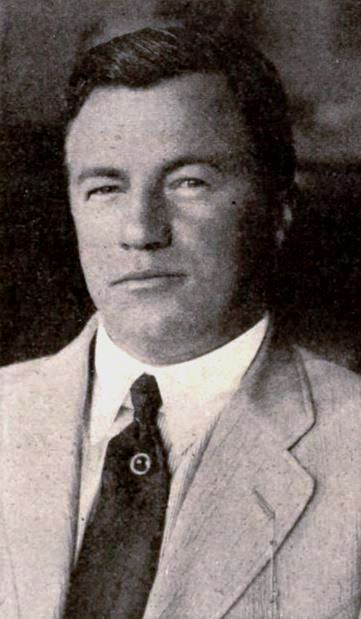
- Smith in 1919
- Born: Albert Edward Smith; 4 June 1875; Faversham, Kent, England
- Died: 1 August 1958 (aged 83); Los Angeles, California, US
- Occupations: Film director and producer
- Known for: Co-founder of Vitagraph Studios
- Spouse: Hazel Neason

Albert Edward Smith (4 June 1875 – 1 August 1958) was an American stage magician, film director and producer, and a naturalized American. He founded Vitagraph Studios with his business partner James Stuart Blackton in 1897.

== Biography ==
Smith was born 4 June 1874 or 1875 in Faversham, Kent. His family immigrated to the United States when he was still a child. He eventually teamed up with fellow English emigrants J. Stuart Blackton and Ronald Reader to form a touring performance, presenting magic, magic lanterns, drawings, ventriloquism, and recitations.

In 1896, they acquired an Edison Vitascope, and in 1897 Blackton and Smith began producing silent films under the names 'Edison Vitagraph', then the 'Commercial Advertising Bureau'. As 'American Vitagraph', Blackton and Smith came to prominence in 1898 with such films as The Battle of Manilla Bay and Tearing Down the Spanish Flag (both propaganda shorts inspired by the Spanish–American War), as well as the short film animation The Humpty Dumpty Circus. In addition to director and producer, he was also an actor and screenwriter in his films. Smith married three times, including the actress Lucille Smith (born Lucille O'Hair), who used the screen name Jean Paige.

In 1952 Albert E. Smith, along with coauthor Phil A. Koury, published Smith's autobiography, Two Reels and a Crank. The book gives a detailed account of the founding and evolution of Vitagraph Studios, and Smith's many adventures turning the crank on Vitagraph films which included filming the assassination of President William McKinley, covering the Boer War in South Africa, and filming Theodore Roosevelt at San Juan Hill in Cuba. He gives an insider's account of the Motion Picture Patents Company and the General Film Company, both monopolies accused by independent filmmakers of breaking antitrust laws. He describes the expansion of Vitagraph to foreign sales and the building of a laboratory in Paris, France that quickly expanded to processing four times the amount of film as the US laboratory, up until World War I when their foreign sales all but vanished. In 1910, Vitagraph sent a permanent company to California including actors, directors, writers crafts people, and Albert's older brother, W. S. Smith, as business manager. The company shot at locations across the country including Ausable Chasm in upper New York State, and they made the first movie ever shot in the Grand Canyon. In February 1911 they arrived in Los Angeles and took up housing in a Santa Monica mansion. The frequently overcast skies by the beach quickly led to the establishment of Vitagraph's lot in East Hollywood. The lot is still active in production, and owned by the Walt Disney Company, at the intersection of Prospect and Talmadge Avenues under the name The Prospect Studios. The last chapter includes a long list of people who worked for Vitagraph. March 1948, Smith received an Oscar Award at the 20th annual awards ceremony. It was presented by Jean Hersholt. The inscription on the base of the Oscar reads: "One of the small group of pioneers whose belief in a new medium, and whose contributions to its development, blazed the trail along which the motion picture has progressed, in their lifetime, from obscurity to world-wide acclaim."

After early legal issues with the Edison company, Vitagraph Studios was very successful in the early silent era, moving to the Flatbush area of Brooklyn in 1905. However, it became financially unstable during World War I and in 1925, Smith sold the company to Warner Brothers and retired.

Smith died on 1 August 1958 in Los Angeles, California.
