= The Changing Woman =

- Directed by: David Smith
- Written by: O. Henry (story); Robert A. Sanborn
- Produced by: Albert E. Smith
- Starring: Hedda Nova; J. Frank Glendon; Otto Lederer
- Cinematography: C. Smith Jr.
- Production company: Vitagraph Company of America
- Distributed by: V-L-S-E
- Release date: August 19, 1918
- Running time: 50 minutes
- Country: United States
- Languages: Silent; English intertitles

The Changing Woman is a 1918 American silent comedy drama film directed by David Smith and starring Hedda Nova, J. Frank Glendon and Otto Lederer.

== Plot summary ==
An opera diva touring with her company in South America charms everyone she meets except Johnny Armstrong, who has no use for her or any other woman. When she is taken captive by an Indian tribe, Johnny rescues her. On their way back to civilization, Johnny sees a change in her brought about by the experience of being captured and rescued, and he begins to fall for her. However, the closer they get to civilization, the more she begins to revert to the arrogant, attention-craving diva she had been. Johnny comes up with a plan he hopes will "bring back" the woman he has grown to love.

== Cast ==
- Hedda Nova as Nina Girard
- J. Frank Glendon as Johnny Armstrong
- Otto Lederer as President Guzman Blanco
- George Kunkel as Company Manager
