= Folly of Youth =

1925 film

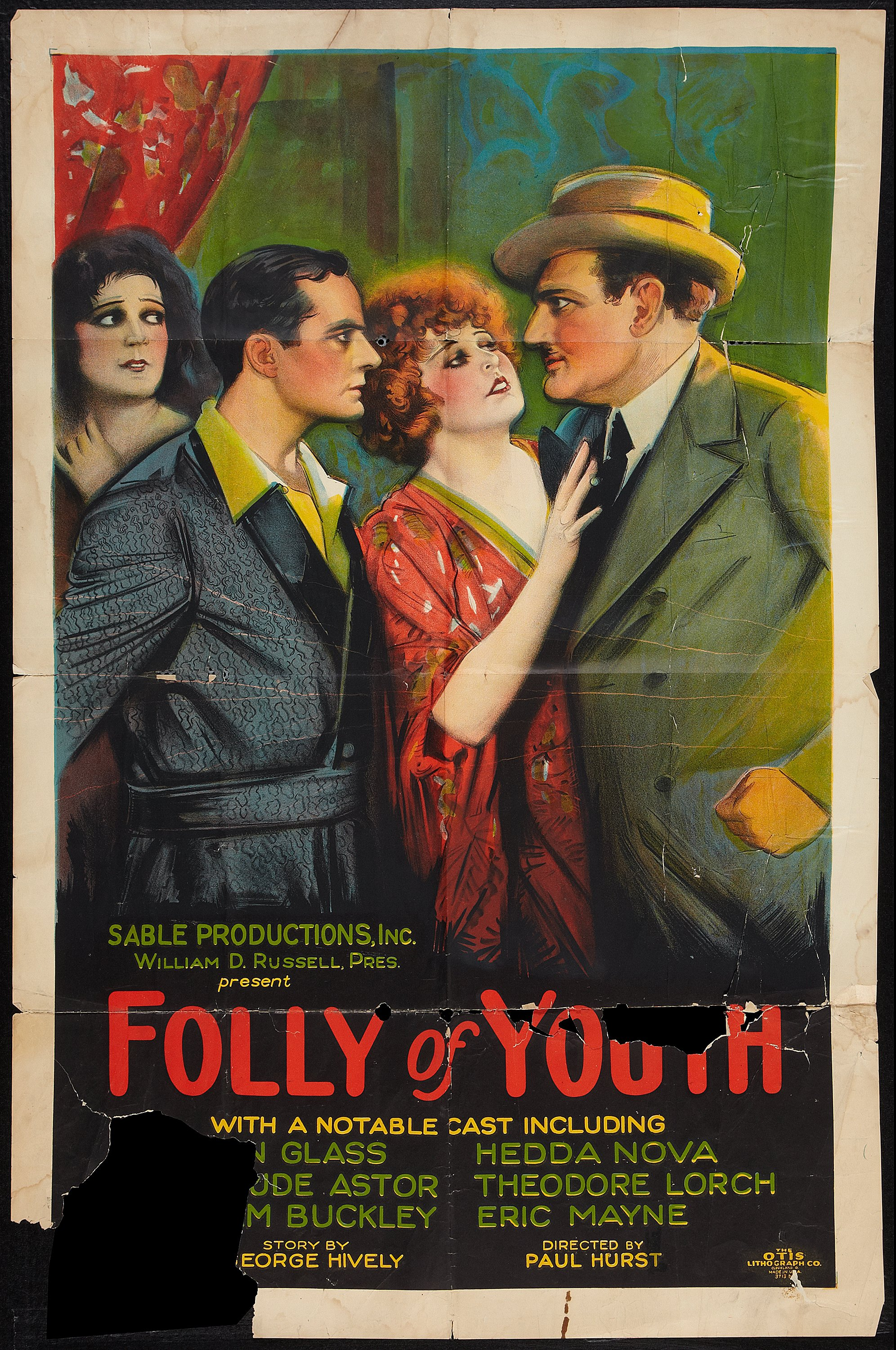
- Directed by: Paul Hurst
- Written by: George Hively
- Produced by: Jack Mower; William O. Russell
- Starring: Gaston Glass; Hedda Nova; Noah Beery
- Production company: Sable Productions
- Distributed by: Usla Company
- Release date: February 7, 1925
- Running time: 50 minutes
- Country: United States
- Languages: Silent; English intertitles

Folly of Youth is a 1925 American independent silent crime drama film directed by Paul Hurst and starring Gaston Glass, Hedda Nova and Noah Beery. It takes place during the era of Prohibition.

== Plot ==
After his sister falls ill from drinking some bad booze, Robert Cartwright sets out to investigate and expose those bootleggers but unexpectedly encounters an attractive woman who has been roped into the gang of criminals.

== Cast ==
- Gaston Glass as Robert Cartwright
- Hedda Nova as Leona Haynes
- Noah Beery as Lee Haynes
- Gertrude Astor as Evelyn Cartwright
- Rosaline Marlin
- Eric Mayne
- Theodore Lorch

== Bibliography ==
- Connelly, Robert B. The Silents: Silent Feature Films, 1910-36, Volume 40, Issue 2. December Press, 1998.
- Munden, Kenneth White. The American Film Institute Catalog of Motion Pictures Produced in the United States, Part 1. University of California Press, 1997.
