= The Confidence Man (film) =

1924 film

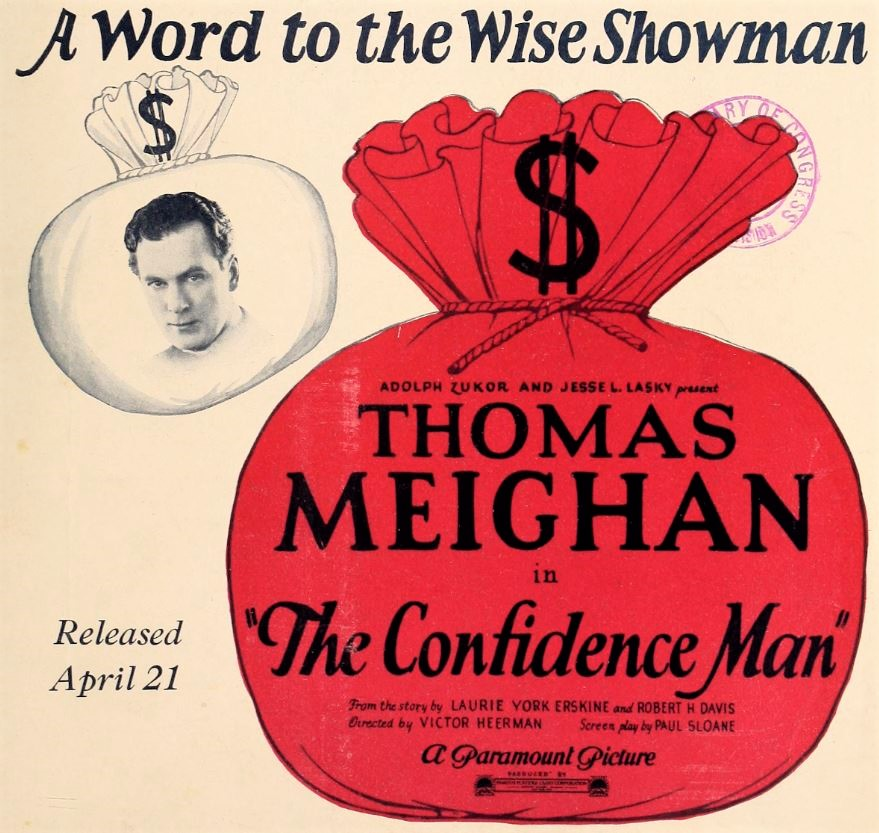
- Advertisement
- Directed by: Victor Heerman
- Based on: The Confidence Man by Laurie York Erskine
- Produced by: Adolph Zukor; Jesse Lasky
- Starring: Thomas Meighan
- Cinematography: Henry Cronjager
- Distributed by: Paramount Pictures
- Release date: April 20, 1924
- Running time: 8 reels
- Country: United States
- Language: Silent (English intertitles)

The Confidence Man is a 1924 American silent romantic comedy film directed by Victor Heerman. Its duration is about 80 minutes and it stars Thomas Meighan and Virginia Valli. It was produced by Famous Players–Lasky and distributed by Paramount Pictures.

== Plot ==
As described in a film magazine review, Dan Corvan and Larry Maddox, backed by fake promoter Wade, visit Fairfield to sell worthless stock to the town miser, Godfred Queritt. Corvan's suave personality impresses the townsfolk and pretty Margaret Leland. Queritt buys the stock. Wade arrives and quarrels with Corvan. An old lady inmate of the poorhouse sends for Corvan and entrusts him with money stolen by her son, which she wants turned over to its owner. This breaks Corvan down and he resolves to go straight. He beats up Wade, makes restitution to Querritt, and confesses all to Margaret, who then admits that she loves him.

== Cast ==
- Thomas Meighan as Dan Corvan
- Virginia Valli as Margaret Leland
- Laurence Wheat as Larry Maddox
- Charles Dow Clark as Godfred Queritt
- Helen Lindroth as Mrs. Bland
- Jimmie Lapsley as Jimmie Bland
- Margaret Seddon as Mrs. X
- George Nash as Wade
- Dorothy Walters as Mrs. O'Brien
- David Higgins as The Minister

== Preservation ==
With no copies of The Confidence Man located in any film archives, it is a lost film.
