= A Man Must Live =

1925 film

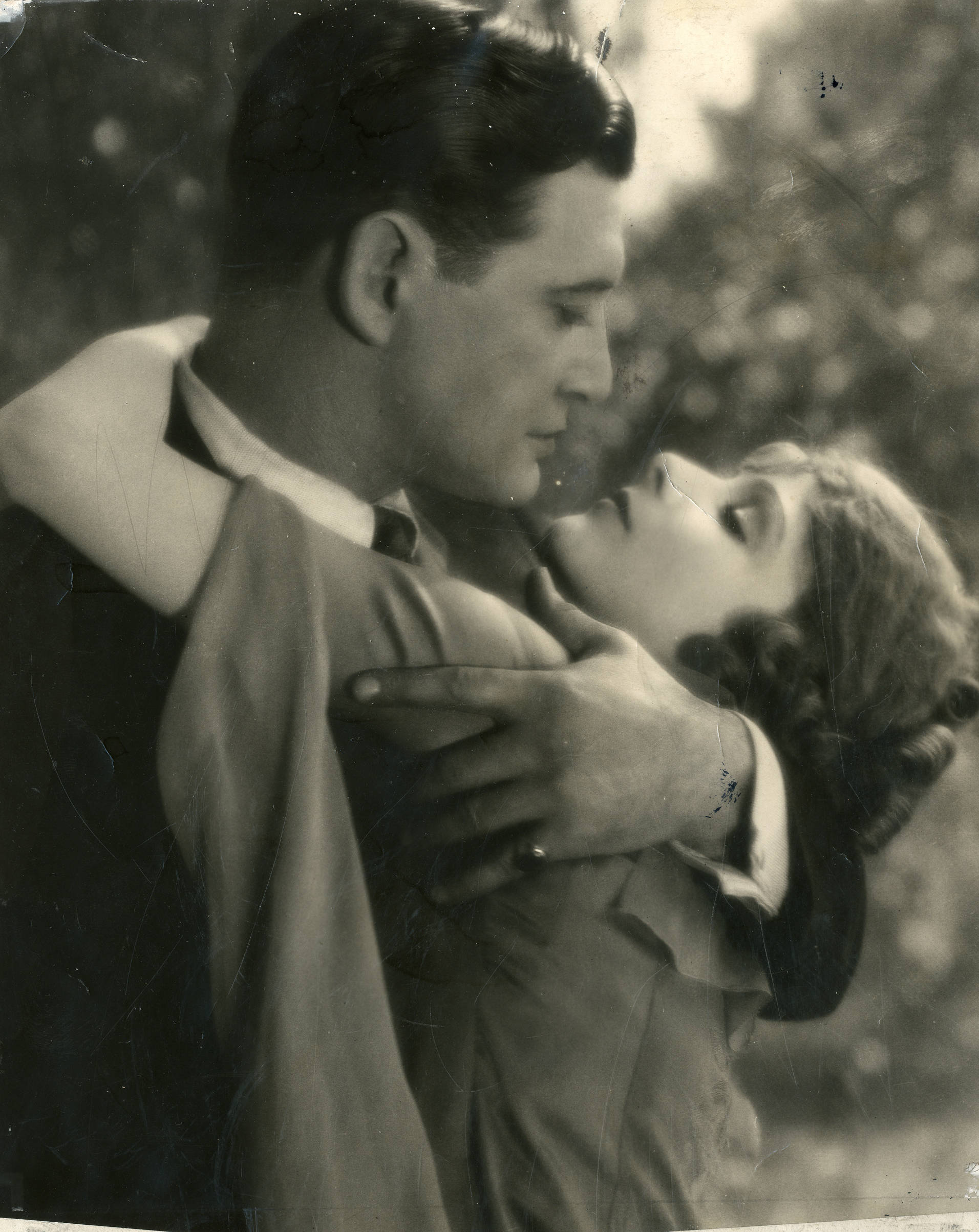
- Still with Richard Dix and Jacqueline Logan
- Directed by: Paul Sloane
- Screenplay by: James Ashmore Creelman
- Based on: Jungle Law by I. A. R. Wylie
- Produced by: Jesse L. Lasky; Adolph Zukor
- Starring: Richard Dix; Jacqueline Logan; George Nash; Edna Murphy
- Cinematography: Harold Rosson
- Production company: Famous Players–Lasky Corporation
- Distributed by: Paramount Pictures
- Release date: January 19, 1925
- Running time: 70 minutes
- Country: United States
- Language: Silent (English intertitles)

A Man Must Live is a 1925 American silent adventure film directed by Paul Sloane and written by James Ashmore Creelman based upon the novel Jungle Law by I. A. R. Wylie. The film stars Richard Dix, Jacqueline Logan, George Nash, Edna Murphy, Charles Byer, and Dorothy Walters. The film was released on January 19, 1925, by Paramount Pictures.

== Plot ==
As described in a review in a film magazine, back from World War I and finding a soldier's welcome, Geoffrey Farnell, while waiting the outcome of a lawsuit against a corporation, finds an uncongenial place on the staff of a scandal-hunting newspaper. Editor Job Hardcastle gives Geoffrey a warning that his stories lack the hectic pep that his readers demand. He is sent to find a racy society divorcee 'Mops' Collins who has sunk to the level of working as a cabaret dancer at a cheap concert hall. He finds her begging the manager not to send her off to a hospital to die. Geoffrey is touched with pity, and when she staggers to the street in her scanty stage costume, he takes her to his apartment. Reporting a failure to get the story to Hardcastle, he promises that he will turn up a real story if given one more chance. He finds this chance when a war-time buddy Clive Ross-Fayne, shell shocked and devoid of recollection of his personality, is brought into court on charges of being a dope peddler. Believed to be dead and posthumously decorated for valor, it would make a sensation to identify this wreck as the lamented hero. However, Geoffrey loves the man's sister Eleanor. He holds off until he is forced to give up the story to obtain the money that will keep his helpless charge out of the hospital. Then, in a fit of remorse, he seeks to stop publication of the story with a fight, but in vain. As he faces arrest for his assault on the editor, the young woman comes to denounce him, and the friendless waif lies dead in the next room. In an irony of fate, his suit is settled and he comes into his fortune too late to prevent his shame. However, Eleanor understands, the editor is abashed, and the happy ending comes at last.

== Cast ==
- Richard Dix as Geoffrey Farnell
- Jacqueline Logan as 'Mops' Collins
- George Nash as Job Hardcastle
- Edna Murphy as Eleanor Ross-Fayne
- Charles Byer as Clive Ross-Fayne
- Dorothy Walters as Mrs. Jaynes
- William Ricciardi as Cabaret Owner
- Arthur Housman as Tod Cragge
- Lucius J. Henderson as Ross-Fayne
- Jane Jennings as Mrs. Ross-Fayne

== Preservation ==
With no prints of A Man Must Live located in any film archives, it is a lost film.
