= The Woman in the Web =

1918 film

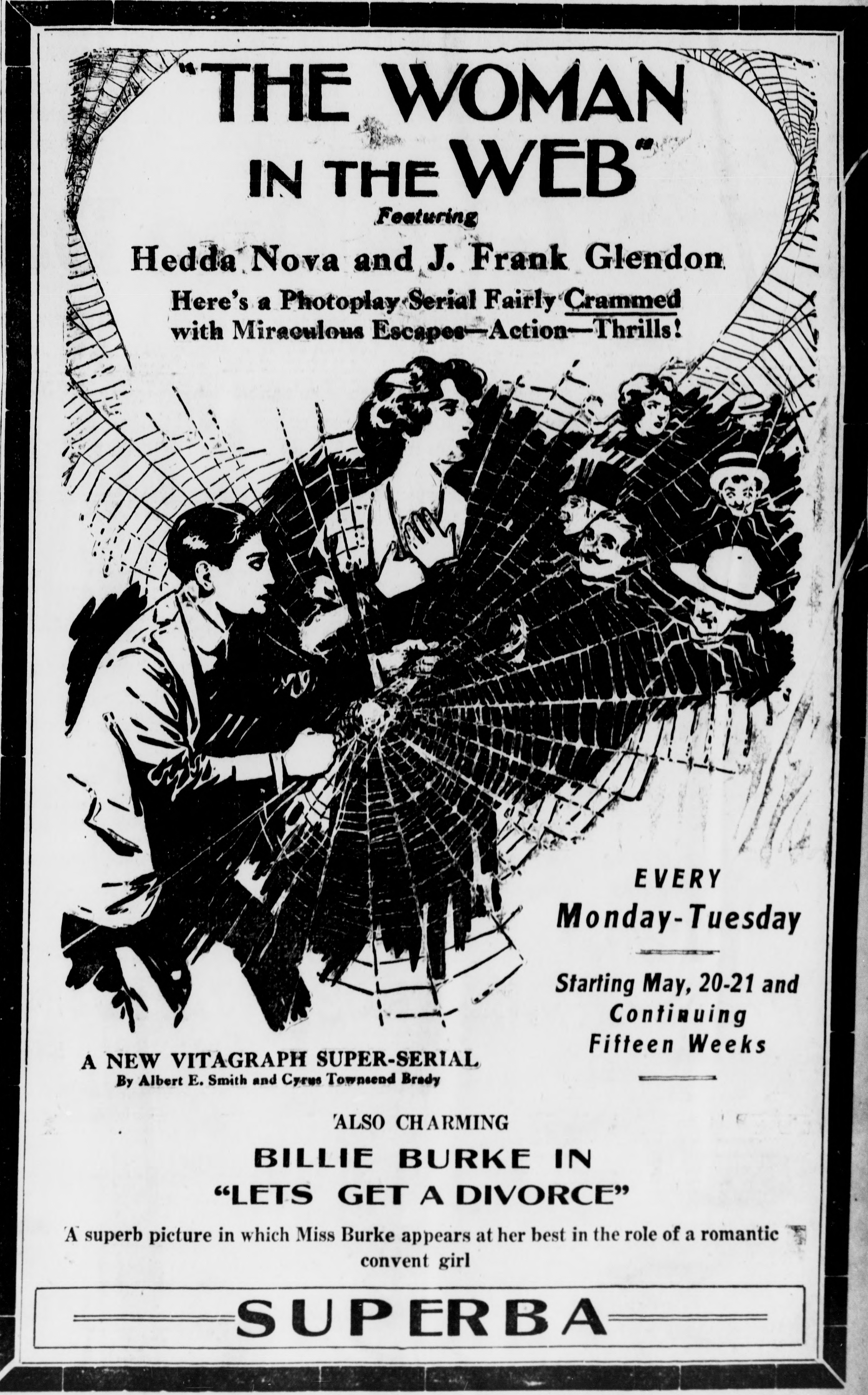
- Newspaper advertisement
- Directed by: Paul Hurst; David Smith
- Starring: Hedda Nova
- Distributed by: Vitagraph Studios
- Release date: April 8, 1918
- Running time: 15 episodes
- Country: United States
- Language: Silent (English intertitles)

The Woman in the Web is a 1918 American drama film serial directed by Paul Hurst and David Smith. It was the 9th of 17 serials released by The Vitagraph Company of America. This World War I period serial about a Russian princess and the overthrow of the Tsar introduced the concept of the Red Menace to serials. The serial is now considered to be a lost film.

== Cast ==
- Hedda Nova as Princess Olga Muratoft
- J. Frank Glendon as Jack Lawford
- Robert Bradbury as Baron Kovsky (credited as Ronald Bradbury)
- Otto Lederer as Colonel Bormsk
- Chet Ryan as Ivan, the Cossack
- Hoot Gibson as Vassily, Ivan's Brother
- Patricia Palmer as Countess Irsky
- George Kuwa

== Chapters ==
1. Caught in the Web
2. The Open Switch
3. The Speeding Doom
4. The Clutch of Terror
5. The Hand of Mystery
6. Full Speed Ahead
7. The Crater of Death
8. The Plunge of Horror
9. The Fire Trap
10. Out of the Dungeon
11. In the Desert's Grip
12. Hurled to Destruction
13. The Hidden Menace
14. The Crash of Fate
15. Out of the Web

== Reception ==
Like many American films of the time, A Woman in the Web was subject to cuts by city and state film censorship boards. For example, the Chicago Board of Censors cut, in Chapter 4, Reel 1, the man attacking and binding young woman on the boat, and choking scene on top of cabin; in Chapter 5, Reel 1, two views of men shooting and men falling from automobile and, Reel 2, actual cutting of handbag cord and taking handbag; in Chapter 7, Reel 2, binding man at point of gun and letting man down crater by rope; in Chapter 8, Reel 1, the intertitle "Now talk or we'll kill you", two scenes of threatening man with knife, Reel 2, two scenes of bomb throwing from airplane and shooting at automobile; in Chapter 11, Reel 1, all train holdup scenes to include scenes of passengers with hands up, shooting, man with gun, and shooting at automobile, and, Reel 2, all views of man about to be hanged from tree to include two closeups and one distant view; in Chapter 12, Reel 1, four scenes of man with rope around neck, the intertitle "We all was about to have a necktie party", and two scenes of man falling from horse; in Chapter 14, Reel 1, shooting scene in which man falls, and, in Chapter 15, Reel 2, binding of young woman, closeup of choking man.

== See also ==
- Hoot Gibson filmography
- List of film serials
- List of film serials by studio
- List of lost films
