= The Love Bandit =

1924 film directed by Dell Henderson

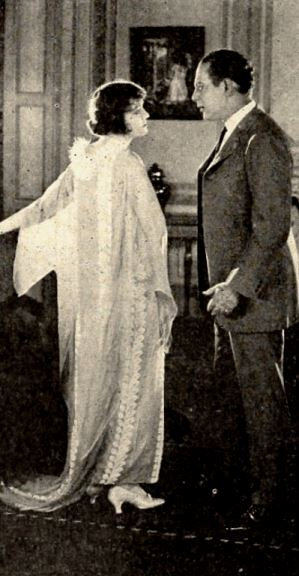
- Still with Kenyon and Sutherland
- Directed by: Dell Henderson
- Written by: Lewis Allen Browne
- Based on: The Love Bandit by Charles E. Blaney and Norman Houston
- Starring: Doris Kenyon; Victor Sutherland; Cecil Spooner
- Production company: Charles E. Blaney Productions
- Distributed by: Vitagraph Company of America
- Release date: January 6, 1924
- Running time: 60 minutes
- Country: United States
- Language: Silent (English intertitles)

The Love Bandit is a 1924 American silent Western film with a Northwoods theme directed by Dell Henderson and starring Doris Kenyon, Victor Sutherland, and Cecil Spooner.

== Plot ==
As described in a film magazine review, Amy Van Clayton is saved from drowning by Jim Blazes, whom she meets in a lumber camp. In New York City, Amy finds that her brother Fred Clayton is in danger of going to jail for robbing from his employer, who turns out to be Jim Blazes. Amy marries Jim to save her brother. Feeling that his wife does not love him, Jim returns to the lumber camp and is wounded in a gang fight. Amy is kidnapped and Jim gets into a vicious gun fight with Amy's kidnappers whom he later subdues. He saves Amy, who was tied to a buzzsaw table, from certain death. Now rescued, Amy finds happiness with her husband.

== Cast ==
- Doris Kenyon as Amy Van Clayton
- Victor Sutherland as Jim Blazes
- Cecil Spooner as Madge Dempsey
- Lorenza Valentine as "Frenchie" Annie
- Jules Cowles as Henri Baribeau
- Gardner James as Frederick Van Clayton
- Christian J. Frank as Buck Ramsdell
- Dorothy Walters as Maggie McGuiry
- Edward Boulden as "Snapper" Rollins
- Walter Jones as John Lawson
- Evelyn McCoy as Minor Role (uncredited)
- Tom Wilson as Minor Role (uncredited)

== Censorship ==
Before The Love Bandit could be exhibited in Kansas, the Kansas Board of Review required the removal of the scene where a man is shot in "cold blood."

== Preservation ==
An abridged version of The Love Bandit survives with a private collector.

== See also ==
- Blue Jeans (1917)
- The Ice Flood (1926)

== Bibliography ==
- Goble, Alan (1999). The Complete Index to Literary Sources in Film. Walter de Gruyter. ISBN 1-85739-229-9
