= By the World Forgot =

1918 American silent film

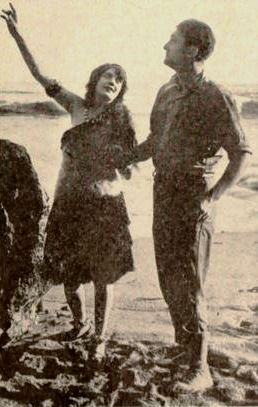
- Film still with Hedda Nova and Frank Glendon
- Directed by: David Smith
- Written by: F. R. Buckley (scenario)
- Based on: By the World Forgot by Cyrus Townsend Brady
- Starring: Hedda Nova
- Production company: Vitagraph Company of America
- Distributed by: Vitagraph Company of America
- Release date: September 17, 1918 (United States)
- Running time: 5 reels
- Country: United States
- Language: Silent (English intertitles)

By the World Forgot is a lost 1918 American silent film directed by David Smith produced and distributed by the Vitagraph Company of America. It is based on the 1917 novel of the same name by Cyrus Townsend Brady.

== Cast ==
- Hedda Nova as Trudy
- J. Frank Glendon as Derrick Van Beekman
- Edward Aleander as George Harnash
- Patricia Palmer as Stephanie Maynard
- Robert N. Bradbury as John Maynard
- George Kunkel as William Waywood
- Otto Lederer as Hano
- Jacob Abrams
