= A Kiss for Cinderella (film) =

1925 film by Herbert Brenon

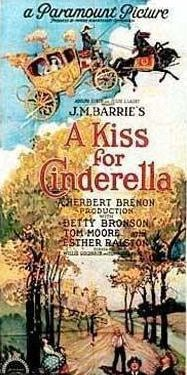
- 1925 lobby poster
- Directed by: Herbert Brenon
- Written by: James M. Barrie (play); Willis Goldbeck (scenario); Townsend Martin (scenario)
- Produced by: Adolph Zukor; Jesse L. Lasky
- Starring: Betty Bronson; Tom Moore; Esther Ralston; Dorothy Cumming
- Cinematography: J. Roy Hunt
- Distributed by: Paramount Pictures
- Release date: December 22, 1925
- Running time: 10 reels; 9,686 feet
- Country: United States
- Language: Silent (English intertitles)

A Kiss for Cinderella (full film)

A Kiss for Cinderella is a 1925 American silent fantasy film adapted from the 1916 stage play by James M. Barrie. The film stars Betty Bronson and Tom Moore and was made at Paramount's Astoria Studios in Astoria, Queens. The play had starred the stage actresses Hilda Trevelyan and Maude Adams in, respectively, London and New York as leading lady.

The film was directed by Herbert Brenon who had also directed the 1924 film version of Barrie's Peter Pan, which also starred Bronson. Tom Moore had previously costarred in The Cinderella Man for Goldwyn in 1917 alongside Mae Marsh.

== Plot ==
As described in a film magazine review, Jane, a house slavey who dreams of a Prince Charming, is named Cinderella by an artist whose studio she cleans because she always talks of wonderful things that will one day befall her. A policeman who at first suspects her of some mischief falls in love with her, and, after she recovers from an illness caused by exposure, he proposes and is accepted.

== Cast ==
- Betty Bronson as Cinderella (Jane)
- Esther Ralston as Fairy Godmother
- Dorothy Cumming as Queen
- Tom Moore as Policeman
- Flora Finch as Customer
- Ivan F. Simpson as Mr. Cutaway (credited as Ivan Simpson)
- Edna Hagen as Gretchen
- Dorothy Walters as Mrs. Maloney

== Preservation ==
Prints of A Kiss for Cinderella are preserved at the Museum of Modern Art, New York, George Eastman Museum Motion Picture Collection, UCLA Film and Television Archive, and the foreign archive Cinematheque Royale de Belgique (Brussels).
