= Buchanan's Wife =

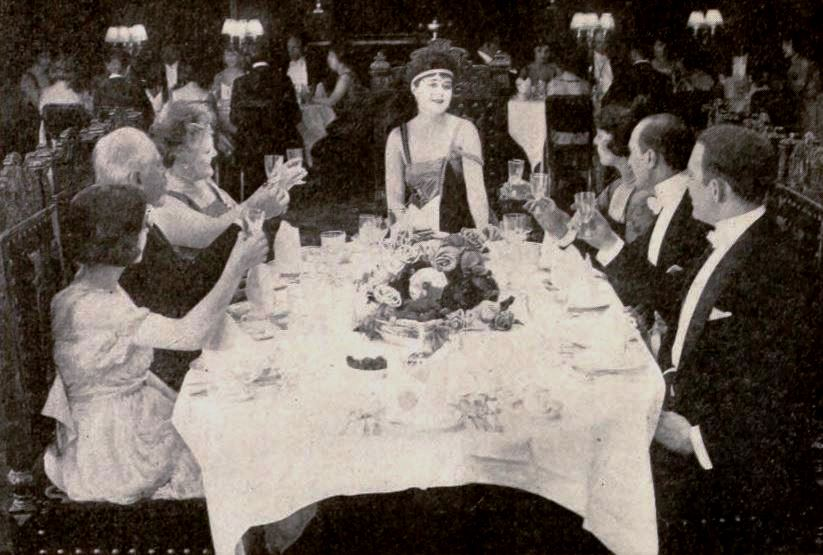
- Still of Buchanan's Wife showing Virginia Pearson at the center
- Directed by: Charles Brabin
- Written by: Adrian Johnson
- Based on: Buchanan's Wife by Justus Miles Forman
- Starring: Virginia Pearson; Marc McDermott; Victor Sutherland; Ned Finley
- Production company: Fox Film Corporation
- Distributed by: Fox Film Corporation
- Release date: December 1, 1918
- Running time: 5 reels
- Country: United States
- Languages: Silent film (English intertitles)

Buchanan's Wife is a 1918 American silent drama film directed by Charles Brabin and starring Virginia Pearson, Marc McDermott, Victor Sutherland, and Ned Finley. It is based on the 1906 novel of the same name by Justus Miles Forman. The film was released by Fox Film Corporation on December 1, 1918.

== Cast ==
- Virginia Pearson as Beatrix Buchanan
- Marc McDermott as Herbert Buchanan
- Victor Sutherland as Harry Faring
- Ned Finley as Kansas, a tramp

== Preservation ==
The film is now considered lost.
