= J. Frank Glendon =

American actor (1886–1937)

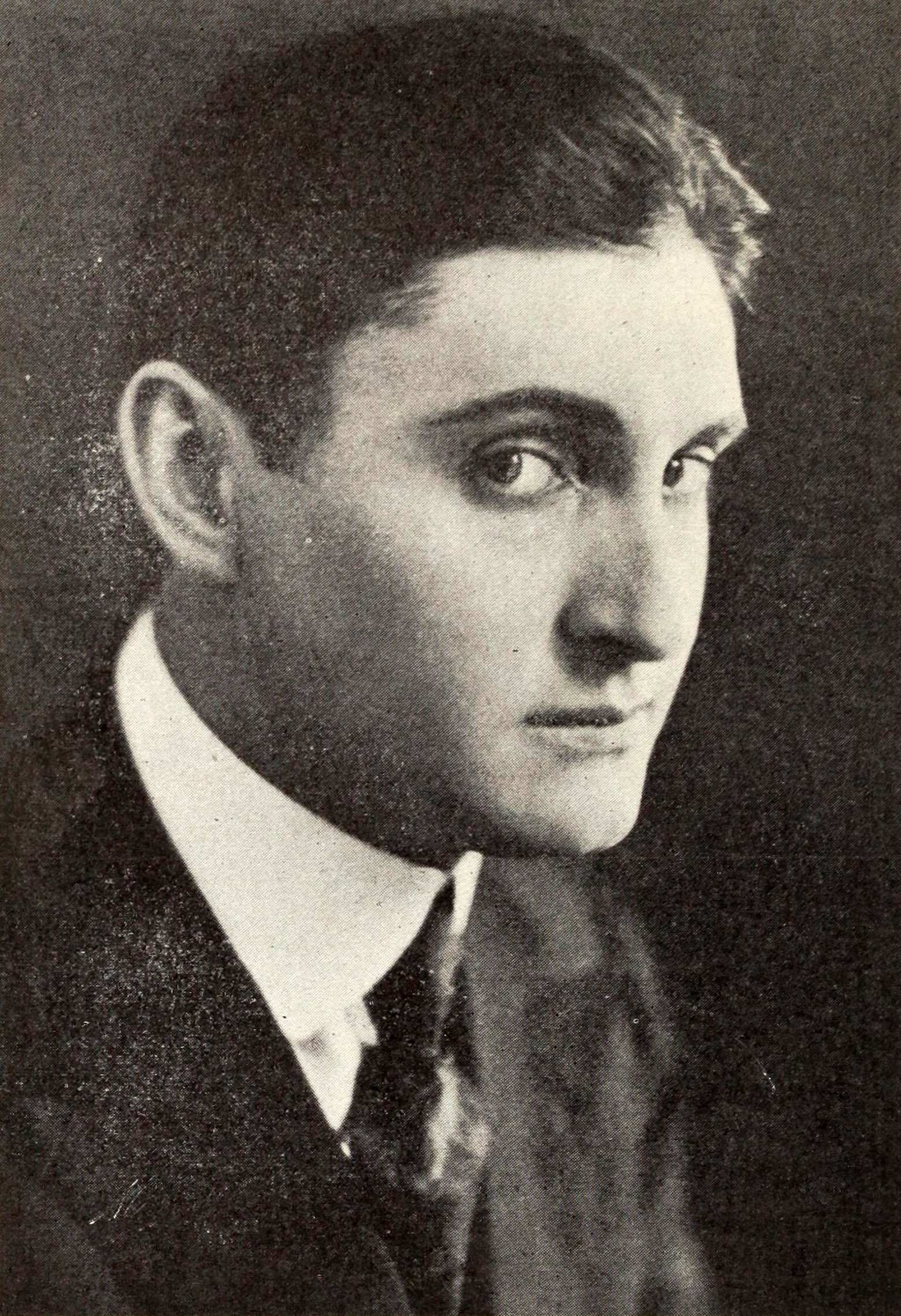
- Glendon in 1921
- Born: Jonathan Frank Glendon; October 25, 1886; Choteau, Montana, US
- Died: March 17, 1937 (aged 50); Hollywood, California, US
- Occupation: Actor
- Years active: 1915–1936

Jonathan Frank Glendon (October 25, 1886 – March 17, 1937) was an American actor in films and on the stage. He appeared in more than 70 films between 1915 and 1936. Also known for his writings and lectures on economics (the latter often heard on radio), Glendon was closely aligned with the technocracy movement from its inception.

== Early life and career ==
Glendon was born in Choteau, Montana, where his father was a Methodist minister. He studied vocal music at Wesleyan University in Helena, Montana.

Glendon's entertainment career began when he sang with the Roscian Opera Company. After that he began acting on stage before entering the film industry.

He died in Hollywood, California. His daughter Glendora Glendon married composer Rudy Schrager.

== Selected filmography ==
- Cannibal King (1915)
- The Light in Darkness (1917)
- Wrath of Love (1917)
- A Night in New Arabia (1917)
- The Dawn of Understanding (1918)
- The Woman in the Web (1918)
- The Changing Woman (1918)
- By the World Forgot (1918)
- The Enchanted Barn (1919)
- The Wishing Ring Man (1919)
- Roman Candles (1920)
- Mid-Channel (1920)
- For the Soul of Rafael (1920)
- The Forgotten Woman (1921)
- What Do Men Want? (1921)
- Hush (1921)
- A Tale of Two Worlds (1921)
- Belle of Alaska (1922)
- More to Be Pitied Than Scorned (1922)
- Night Life in Hollywood (1922)
- Kissed (1922)
- Just Like a Woman (1923)
- South Sea Love (1923)
- Private Affairs (1925)
- Tricks (1925)
- Lights of Old Broadway (1925)
- Border Romance (1929)
- The Cheyenne Cyclone (1931)
- The Texas Tornado (1932)
- Law and Lawless (1932)
- The Reckless Rider (1932)
- The Lost Special (1932)
- Notorious but Nice (1933)
- Her Splendid Folly (1933)
- Gun Law (1933)
- Strange People (1933)
- The Phantom Empire (1935)
- The Fighting Marines (1935)
- The Call of the Savage (1935)
- King of the Pecos (1936)
- The Lion's Den (1936)
- The Traitor (1936)

== Sources ==
- Rainey, B. (1996) The Reel Cowboy: Essays on the Myth in Movies and Literature (1st ed.). Philadelphia: McFarland & Company, Inc. ISBN 0-7864-0106-0.
