= The Spitfire of Seville =

1919 film directed by George Siegmann

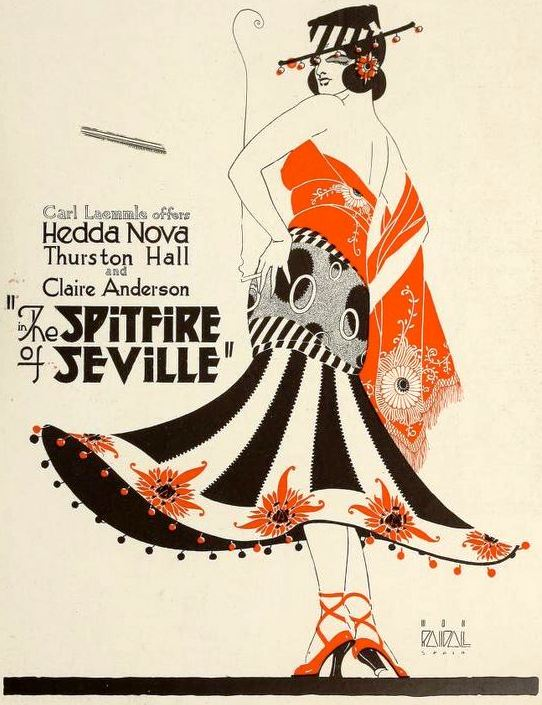
- Advertisement
- Directed by: George Siegmann
- Written by: Joseph F. Poland; Waldemar Young
- Starring: Hedda Nova; Thurston Hall; Claire Anderson
- Cinematography: Alfred Gosden
- Production company: Universal Pictures
- Distributed by: Universal Pictures
- Release date: July 21, 1919
- Running time: 60 minutes
- Country: United States
- Language: Silent (English intertitles)

The Spitfire of Seville is a 1919 American silent drama film directed by George Siegmann and starring Hedda Nova, Thurston Hall, and Claire Anderson.

== Cast ==
- Hedda Nova as Carmelita Delgado
- Thurston Hall as Kent Staunton
- Claire Anderson as Alice Foster
- Marian Skinner as Her Mother
- François Dumas as Don Salvador
- Leo D. Maloney as Pedro
- Robert Gray as Leonardo
- Edgar Allen as Romero

== Bibliography ==
- Darby, William. Masters of Lens and Light: A Checklist of Major Cinematographers and Their Feature Films. Scarecrow Press, 1991.
