= Calibre 38 =

1919 film

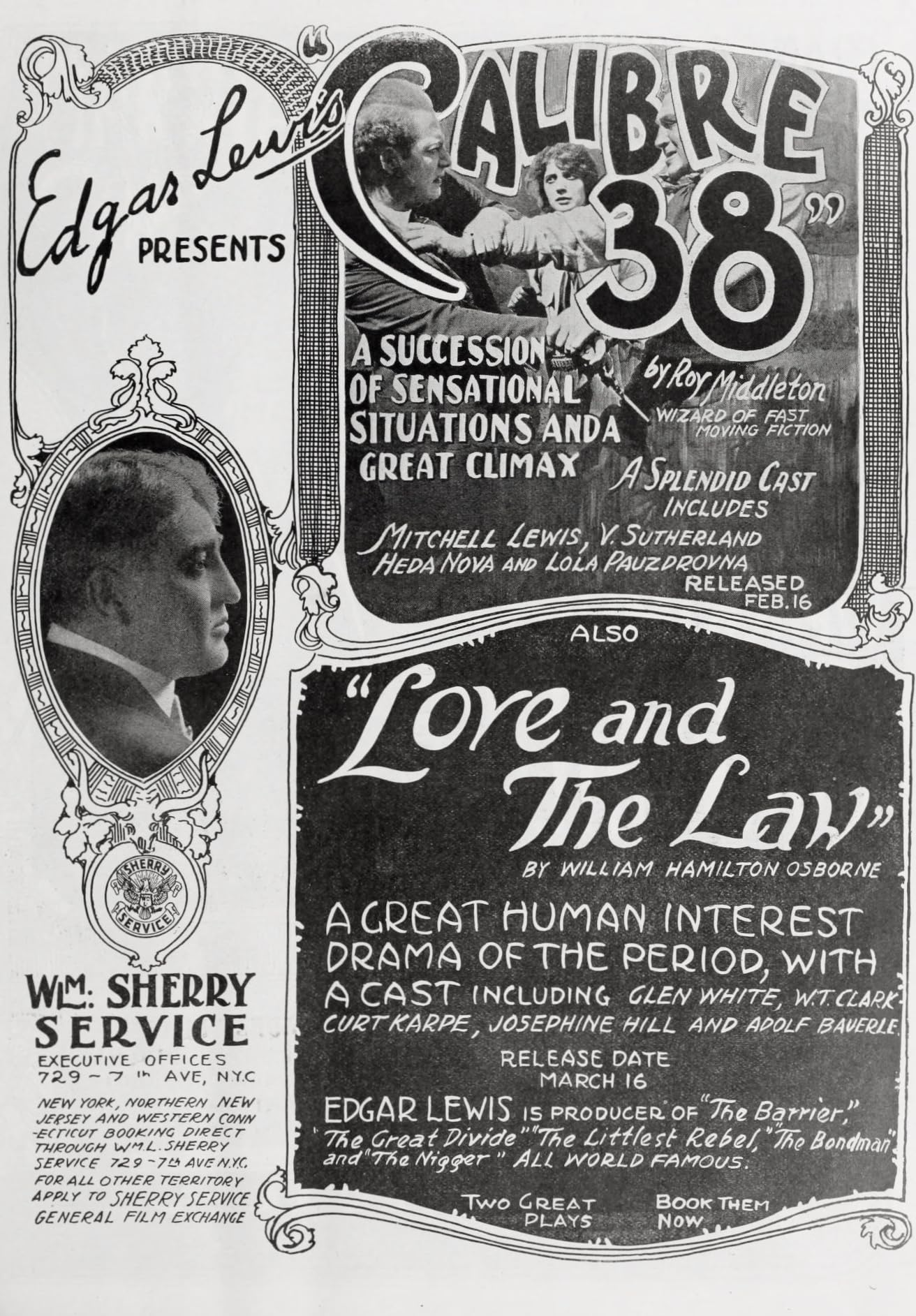
- Contemporary advertisement
- Directed by: Edgar Lewis
- Written by: Roy Middleton (story)
- Produced by: Edgar Lewis Productions
- Starring: Mitchell Lewis
- Distributed by: William L. Sherry Service; Film Clearing House
- Release date: February 16, 1919
- Running time: 6 reels
- Country: United States
- Languages: Silent; English intertitles

Calibre 38 is a 1919 existing American silent Western film produced by and directed by Edgar Lewis. It is preserved in the Library of Congress.

== Cast ==
- Mitchell Lewis as Austin Brandt
- Hedda Nova as Joan
- Victor Sutherland as Ford Barton
- Lola Pauzdrovna as Myrtle
- William A. Williams as Barton, Capitalist
- Edward Roseman as Royce Greer (* as Edward F. Roseman)
- William Cavanaugh as Sure Shot Jessup (* as William H. Cavanaugh)
- Mary Carr as Rosemary (* as Mary Kennevean Carr)
