= Nell of the Circus =

1914 film by Cecil Spooner

- Directed by: Cecil Spooner
- Screenplay by: Cecil Spooner
- Starring: Cecil Spooner; Richard Garrick
- Production company: Sawyer Film Company
- Release date: November 1914 (USA)
- Running time: 4 reels
- Language: Silent (with English intertitles)

Nell of the Circus is a 1914 four-act drama film written, directed by, and starring actress Cecil Spooner. The film was based on a play Spooner had frequently starred in, in New York, called Polly of the Circus. The film is thought to be almost lost.

== Plot ==
Nell of the Circus centers around a forbidden marriage between a wealthy heiress with a circus performer, and their daughter, Nell.

== Cast ==
- Cecil Spooner as Nell
- Richard Garrick (role unknown)
