= Hedda Nova =

American actress (1899–1981)

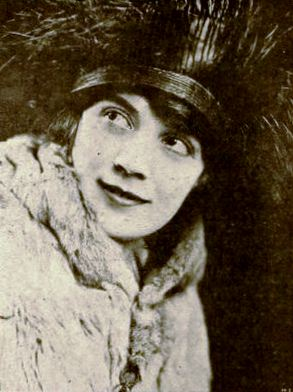
- Nova in 1919
- Born: May 15, 1899; Odessa, Russian Empire
- Died: January 16, 1981 (aged 81); Atascadero, California, U.S.
- Occupation: Actress
- Years active: 1917–1926
- Spouse: Paul Hurst

Hedda Nova (May 15, 1899 – January 16, 1981) was a Russian-born American film actress.

== Biography ==
Born on May 15, 1899, in Odessa, Nova received her schooling at a Parisian convent.

Nova appeared in 16 films, mostly westerns, from 1917 through 1926. The Spitfire of Seville (1919) provided her first starring role. In 1926, she was featured in a six-episode series of two-reel jungle films produced by Chesterfield.

Nova was married to Paul Hurst, an actor, director and screenwriter. She died on January 16, 1981, aged 81, in Atascadero, California.

== Selected filmography ==
- The Bar Sinister (1917)
- The Woman in the Web (1918)
- The Changing Woman (1918)
- By the World Forgot (1918)
- The Spitfire of Seville (1919)
- The Crimson Gardenia (1919)
- Calibre 38 (1919)
- The Turning Point (1920)
- The Mask (1921)
- The Miracle Baby (1923)
- Folly of Youth (1925)
- My Own Pal (1926)
