= The Mask (1921 film) =

1921 film

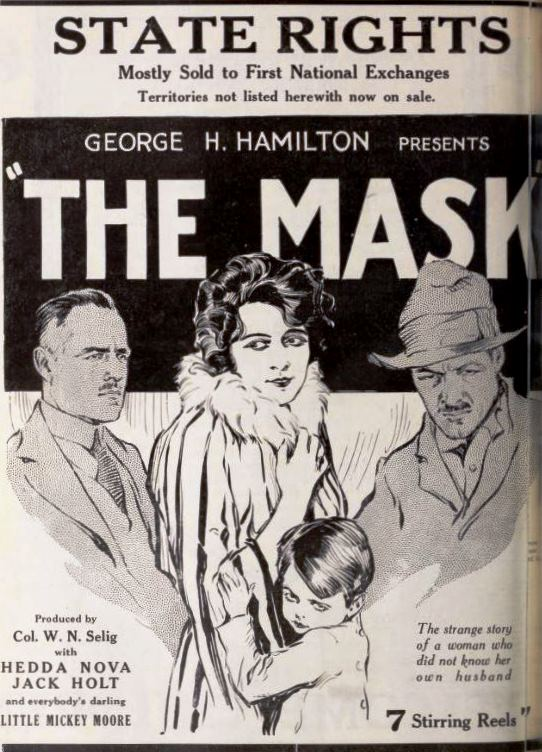
- Directed by: Bertram Bracken
- Written by: Arthur Hornblow (story); Arthur Lavon
- Produced by: George H. Hamilton
- Starring: Jack Holt; Hedda Nova; Michael D. Moore
- Cinematography: Edward Linden
- Production company: Selig Polyscope Company
- Distributed by: Export & Import Film Company
- Release date: June 17, 1921
- Running time: 84 minutes
- Country: United States
- Languages: Silent; English intertitles

The Mask is a 1921 American silent mystery film directed by Bertram Bracken and starring Jack Holt, Hedda Nova and Michael D. Moore. It was adapted for the screen by Arthur Lavon, based on the novel titled The Mask, a story of Love and Adventure by Arthur Hornblow.

== Cast ==
- Jack Holt as Kenneth Traynor / Handsome Jack
- Hedda Nova as Helen Traynor
- Michael D. Moore as Mickey, their son
- Fred Malatesta as Señor Enrico Keralio
- Harry Lonsdale as Winthrop Parker
- Byron Munson as Arthur Steele
- Janice Wilson as Rae Madison
- William Clifford as François

== Preservation ==
The Mask is currently presumed lost. In February of 2021, the film was cited by the National Film Preservation Board on their Lost U.S. Silent Feature Films list.

== Bibliography ==
- Goble, Alan. The Complete Index to Literary Sources in Film. Walter de Gruyter, 1999.
