= Dorothy Walters =

American actress

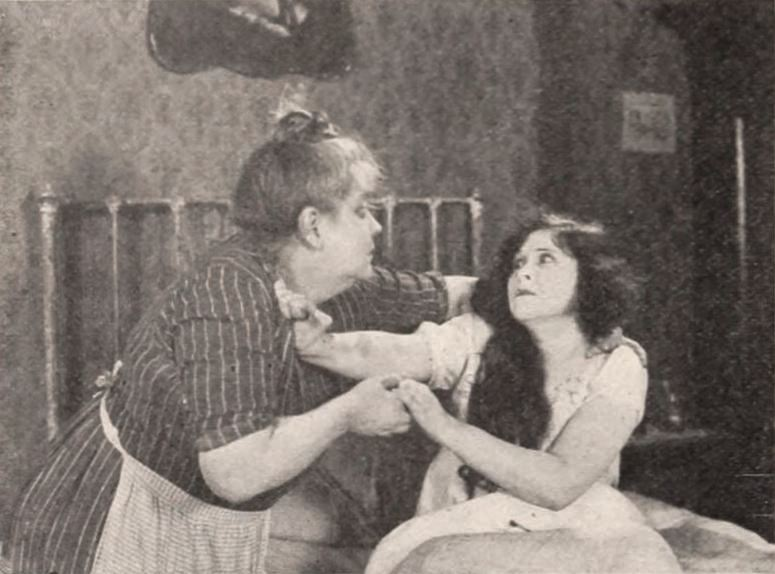
- Dorothy Walters (left) with Hope Hampton in The Light in the Dark, 1922
- Born: 1877; Houston, Texas, US
- Died: April 17, 1934 (aged 57); Manhattan, New York, US
- Occupations: Stage and film actress
- Years active: 1899–1934
- Children: 1 daughter

Dorothy Walters (1877-1934) was an American stage performer and film actress noted for her work in vaudeville, in Broadway productions for nearly 30 years, and in silent films between 1918 and the mid-1920s.

== Early life and stage career ==
Walters was born in Houston, Texas, and began her stage career performing a novelty act as a whistler. She worked on the vaudeville circuit for many years before getting her first Broadway role in the 1904-1905 musical Paris By Night.

As her theatrical career progressed, Walters became well known for her character roles, such as her performance as the cook in Dinner at Eight, which premiered in New York in 1932. Some of the earlier Broadway plays in which she was cast include The Lottery Man (1910), The Great Name (1911), What Ails You? (1912), Irene (1919), Paradise Alley (1924), The Desert Flower (1924), The Devil Within (1925), Kosher Kitty Kelly (1925) with Helen Shipman, The Judge's Husband (1926), Manhattan Mary (1926), Mr. Gilhooley (1930), and The Warrior's Husband (1932).

As an actress she supported the performances of many Broadway stars such as Ethel Barrymore, Helen Hayes, William Hodge, and Minnie Maddern Fiske. Reviews by theatre critics in period trade publications often focus on Walters' penchant for comedy. In its assessment of The Desert Flower in December 1924, Variety—the nation's most comprehensive entertainment paper—recognizes her performance as important comic relief in that production:

Despite its decidedly theatrical pattern, "The Desert Flower" contains many worthy moments...Several comedy touches well planted to relieve the tenseness of the drama also hit for a bull's-eye, especially the wedding celebration scene in the final act and the witticisms of Mrs. McQuade as delivered by Dorothy Walters, whose delineation of an Irish pessimist had [the audience] in continuous howls.

== Films ==
After more than 20 years performing on stage, Walters expanded her career into films. A few of her early screen appearances from 1918 and 1919 are the six-reel melodrama The Woman Who Gave, which was filmed in New York in the Adirondack Mountains; The Zero Hour; Little Miss Hoover; Through the Toils; and the comedy The Misleading Widow. In its review of The Woman Who Gave in November 1918, Variety gives the film a positive assessment and highlights Walters' performance. "Dorothy Walters", the paper reports, "as Delia Picard, a matronly housekeeper, supplied the comedy and received a number of laughs."

During the 1920s, Walters continued to divide her time acting in films and performing on stage. The 1921 edition of the Motion Picture Studio Directory and Trade Annual includes an entry for her, recognizing her screen work, mostly in New York-based productions. In addition to recounting some of her film and stage experience, the directory provides a basic physical description of her and even specifies her home address in 1921: "Hght., 5, 6; wght., 196; reddish gray hair; gray eyes. Ad[dress]., 226 W. 50th st., N.Y. Circle 4673."

In 1924 and 1925, Walters performed in no less than eight more films: Pied Piper Malone, The Love Bandit, The Hoosier Schoolmaster, The Confidence Man, Her Indiscretion, A Man Must Live, The Street of Forgotten Men, and A Kiss for Cinderella. Despite her success as a supporting player in motion pictures at that time and her continuing work on Broadway, she still returned periodically to the vaudeville stage. For example, in the circuit's 1925-1926 season she co-starred with Truman Stanley in Cantor & Brandel's presentation of Fore. Walters' last credited film role, although in an unspecified part, is in Her Indiscretion starring Mahlon Hamilton and May Allison. That production, which was filmed in 1924 in Queens, New York and at Montauk on Long Island, was not released until May 1927. Following that delayed release of Her Indiscretion, Walters' available filmographies show no further credited performances, suggesting that she began to curtail her involvement in films during the latter half of the 1920s, possibly to refocus her career on performing on Broadway and in other "legitimate" theatrical venues near her home in Manhattan.

== Death ==
In 1934, at age 57, Walters died of bronchial pneumonia in her New York home at 236 West 70th Street in Manhattan. Her funeral was conducted by Crowley's Funeral Parlor at 597 Lexington Avenue in Brooklyn. According to her obituary in The New York Times, Walters was still acting just before her death, performing as a cast member in the "current" Broadway production Big-Hearted Herbert. She was survived by her daughter, her mother, and a sister.

== Partial filmography ==
- The Woman Who Gave (1918)
- The Zero Hour (1918)
- Little Miss Hoover (1918)
- The Veiled Marriage (1919)
- Woman, Woman (1919)
- Through the Toils (1919)
- The Misleading Widow (1919)
- Away Goes Prudence (1920)
- Children Not Wanted (1920)
- Flying Pat (1920)
- Good References (1920)
- Beyond Price (1921)
- Received Payment (1922)
- The Light in the Dark (1922)
- Pied Piper Malone (1924)
- The Love Bandit (1924)
- The Hoosier Schoolmaster (1924)
- The Confidence Man (1924)
- A Man Must Live (1925)
- The Street of Forgotten Men (1925)
- A Kiss for Cinderella (1925)
- Her Indiscretions (1927)
- The Viking (1931)—uncredited
