= The Enchanted Barn =

1919 silent film by David Smith

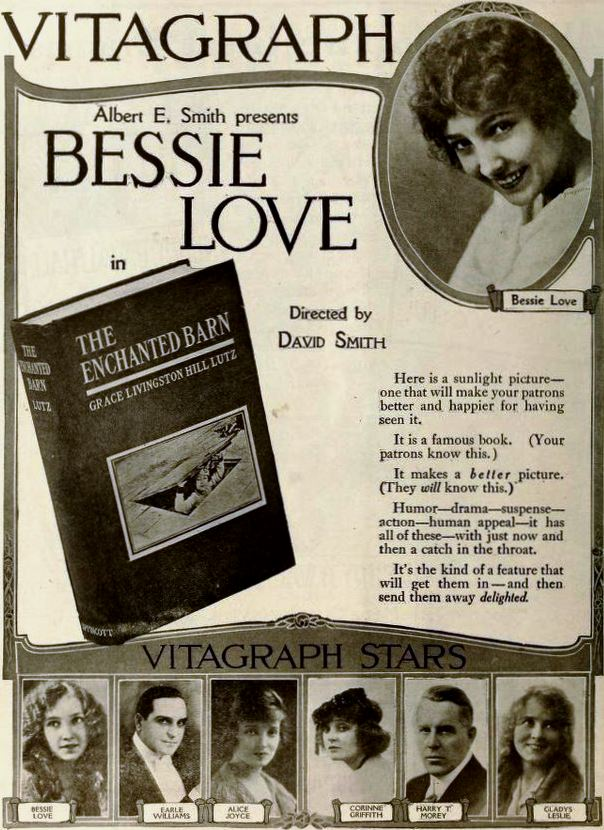
- Magazine advertisement
- Directed by: David Smith
- Screenplay by: Katherine S. Reed
- Based on: The Enchanted Barn by Grace Livingston Hill Lutz
- Starring: Bessie Love; J. Frank Glendon; Joseph Singleton; William T. Horne; Frank Butterworth; Ella Wolbert; Jane Hathaway; Garvey A. Walker
- Cinematography: Charles R. Seeling
- Production company: Vitagraph Studios
- Release date: January 27, 1919 (U.S.)
- Running time: 5 reels
- Country: United States
- Language: Silent (English intertitles)

The Enchanted Barn is a 1919 American silent drama film produced by Vitagraph Studios. It was directed by David Smith and starred Bessie Love and J. Frank Glendon. The script was written by Kathryn Reed, based on the novel by Grace Livingston Hill Lutz. Bessie Love had been familiar with the source novel, and was instrumental in optioning it for this film.

The film is considered lost.

== Plot ==
To care for her ailing mother, young stenographer Shirley takes her young brother to find a new home with country air. She finds a barn, owned by the family of Sidney Graham, who agrees to rent her the barn. She fixes up the barn, and moves in with her mother and brother.

Shirley overhears a conversation between two men who intend to swindle her new landlord in the sale of a mine. She transcribes their words in a stenographic report, and uses it to foil the deal. Graham is very appreciative, and he and Shirley get to know each other. Shirley falls in love with Graham, but she receives word that he is engaged to another woman.

The two swindlers seek revenge on Shirley by kidnapping her, but she manages to notify Graham by dropping a note out of a car window. He calls the sheriff, who tracks down the swindlers, and Graham himself finds Shirley. Once reunited, it is revealed that Graham is not, in fact, engaged to another woman, and that he is in love with Shirley.

== Cast ==
- Bessie Love as Shirley Hollister
- J. Frank Glendon as Sidney Graham
- Joseph Singleton as John L. Barnard
- William T. Horne as Walter Graham
- Frank Butterworth as George Hollister
- Ella Wolbert as Mrs. Hollister
- Jane Hathaway as Mrs. Walter Graham
- Garvey A. Walker as Harley Hollister

== Release and reception ==
Overall, the film received mixed reviews. Bessie Love's performance received good reviews, although it was deemed "much as she has appeared in previous productions". The plot, however, was highly criticized as being thin.

On its release, some theaters showed the film with the Vitagraph comedy short Soapsuds and Sapheads. The film was shown in other theaters with The Dawn of Understanding, which also starred Love, as "Bessie Love Day."
