= The Dawn of Understanding =

1918 film

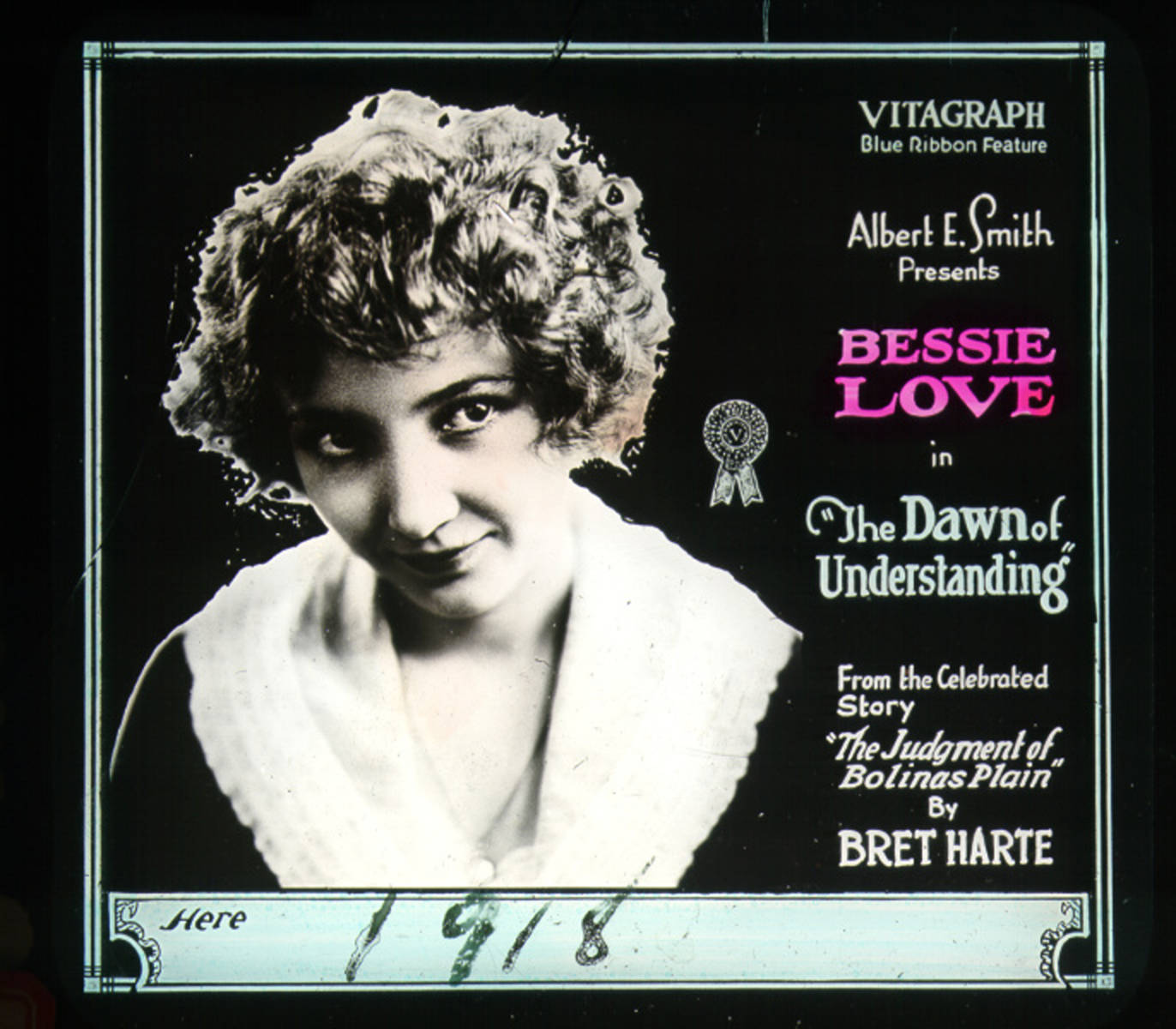
- Lantern slide
- Directed by: David Smith
- Written by: Edward J. Montagne (scenario)
- Based on: "The Judgement of Bolinas Plain" by Bret Harte
- Starring: Bessie Love; John Gilbert
- Cinematography: Charles R. Seeling; Max Dupont
- Production company: Vitagraph Company of America
- Distributed by: General Vitagraph, Incorporated
- Release date: December 2, 1918 (U.S.)
- Running time: 50 minutes; 5 reels
- Country: United States
- Language: Silent (English intertitles)

The Dawn of Understanding is a lost 1918 American silent Western comedy film produced by The Vitagraph Company of America and directed by David Smith. It stars Bessie Love in the first film of her nine-film contract with Vitagraph. It is based on the short story "The Judgement of Bolinas Plain" by 19th-century Western writer Bret Harte.

== Plot ==
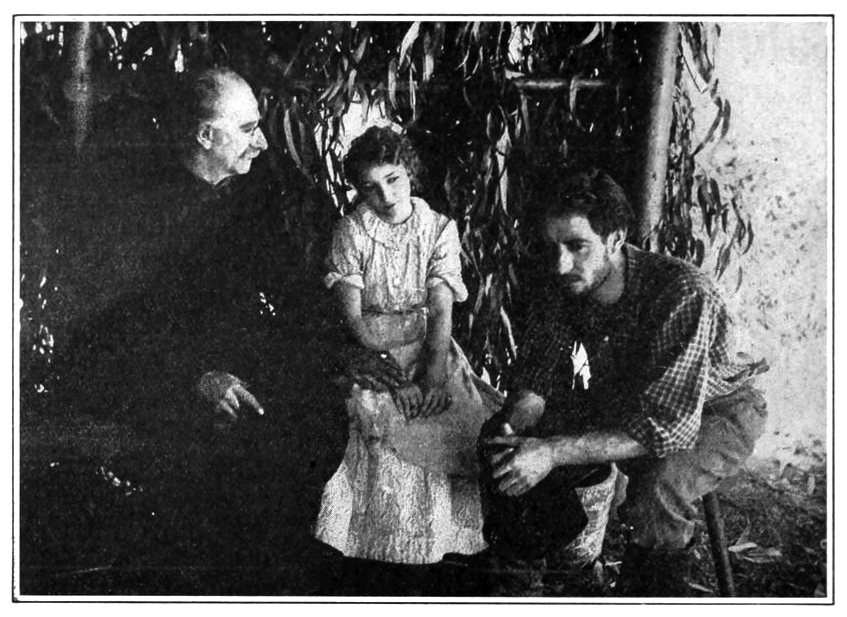
Film still

In 1849, Silas Prescott and his family travel west to the California gold fields by prairie schooner. Along the difficult journey, his wife dies, and they bury her near Ira Beasley's ranch. Beasley becomes enamored of Prescott's daughter Sue, and she stays behind to be Beasley's wife. Their marriage is one of mutual indifference, and Sue grows to resent Beasley.

When the circus comes to town, Sue falls for acrobat Jim Wynd. Jim shoots a man in a brawl and hides in Beasley's barn. Sue discovers him there, and they get acquainted, to the point of planning to elope. Sue empties her husband's gun so that she and Jim can escape more easily.

A mob discovers that Jim is hiding in the barn, surrounding it. Ira, not knowing what is happening, shoots at the sheriff at the same time that Jim does. When Ira is arrested and put on trial for shooting the sheriff, Sue confesses that her husband could not have killed him because his gun was not loaded. Jim is convicted of his crimes.

== Cast ==
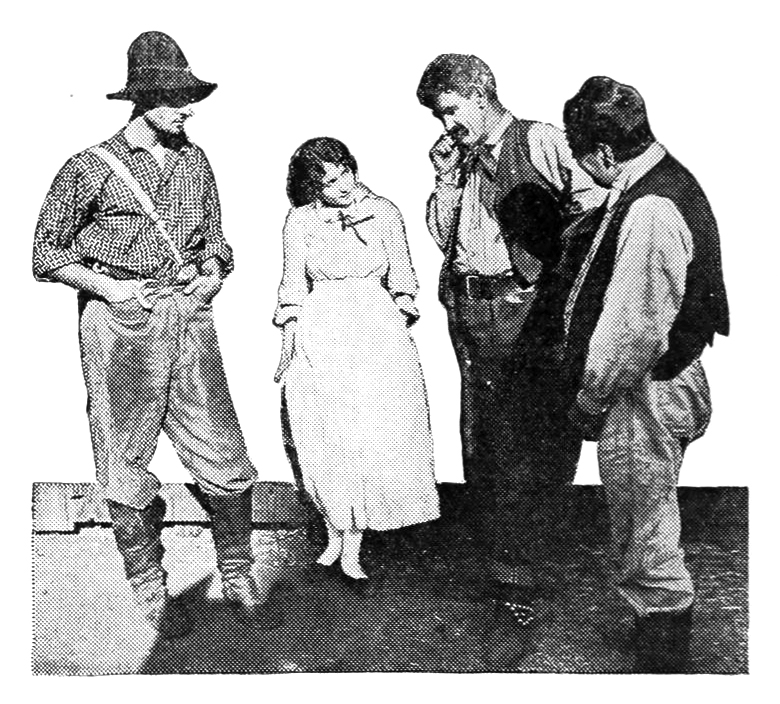
Love and other cast members

- Bessie Love as Sue Prescott
- George A. Williams as Silas Prescott
- John Gilbert as Ira Beasley
- J. Frank Glendon as Jim Wynd
- George Kunkel as Sheriff Jack Scott
- Jacob Abrams as Parson Davies
- Dorothea Wolbert as Mrs. Prescott

== Production ==
Exteriors were filmed at the ranch Sunland and in Riverside.

== Release and reception ==
Reviews were generally positive, and it was generally commercially successful.

The popularity of the film was seen as a rise in the stardom of its star, Bessie Love. Upon its release, it was shown in some theaters with The Enchanted Barn, which also starred Love, as "Bessie Love Day."
