= Maria Thompson Daviess =

American novelist (1872–1924)

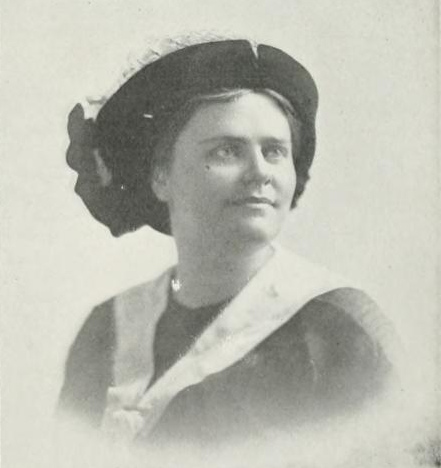
- Davies c. 1911
- Born: November 25, 1872; Harrodsburg, Kentucky
- Died: September 3, 1924 (aged 51); New York City
- Education: Wellesley College
- Occupations: Novelist and artist

Maria Thompson Daviess (November 28, 1872 – September 3, 1924) was an American artist and feminist author. She is best known for her popular novels written in the early 20th century, with a "Pollyanna" outlook, as well as several short stories, among them, “Miss Selina Sue and the Soap-Box Babies," "Sue Saunders of Saunders Ridge" and "Some Juniors.". Daviess was affiliated with the Equal Suffrage League in Kentucky, being the co-founder and vice-president of the chapter in Nashville and an organizer of the chapter in Madison.

== Biography ==
Maria (sometimes "Marie") Thompson Daviess was born in Harrodsburg, Kentucky, November 28, 1872. Her parents were John Burton Thompson Daviess (a relative of the Harrodsburg-born writer Zoe Anderson Norris) and Leonora Hamilton Daviess. The father, John B. T. Daviess, died when she was eight, and the family subsequently relocated to Nashville, Tennessee. Her paternal grandmother, also named Maria Thompson Daviess, was a columnist and lecturer.

Daviess studied one year at Wellesley College, and then travelled to Paris to study art. Returning to Nashville, she continued to paint and also took up writing. Her first novel, Miss Selina Lue and the Soap-box Babies was published in 1909. The Melting of Molly, published in 1912, was one of the top best-selling books for the year. She published sixteen novels between 1909 and 1920.

She resided in Nashville, Tennessee in 1910, but in 1921, she moved to New York City, where she died in September 1924. She did not marry and had no children.

== Bibliography ==
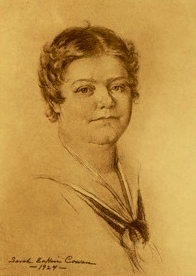
Maria Thompson Daviess, Seven Times Seven frontispiece, 1924

- Miss Selina Lue and the Soap-box Babies (1909)
- The Road To Providence (1910)
- Rose of Old Harpeth (1911)
- The Treasure Babies (1911)
- The Melting of Molly (1912)
- The Elected Mother, A Story of Woman's Equal Rights (1912)
- Andrew the Glad (1913)
- The Tinder Box (1913)
- Sue Jane (1913)
- Phyllis (1914; a "Harpeth Valley" story)
- Over Paradise Ridge (1915)
- The Daredevil (1916) – filmed in 1918
- The Heart's Kingdom (1917)
- Out of a Clear Sky (1917) – filmed in 1918 as Out of a Clear Sky with Marguerite Clark
- The Golden Bird (1918) – filmed in 1918 as Little Miss Hoover with Marguerite Clark
- Bluegrass and Broadway (1919)
- The Matrix (1920)
- Seven Times Seven (1924) (autobiography)
