= Cecil Spooner =

American actress

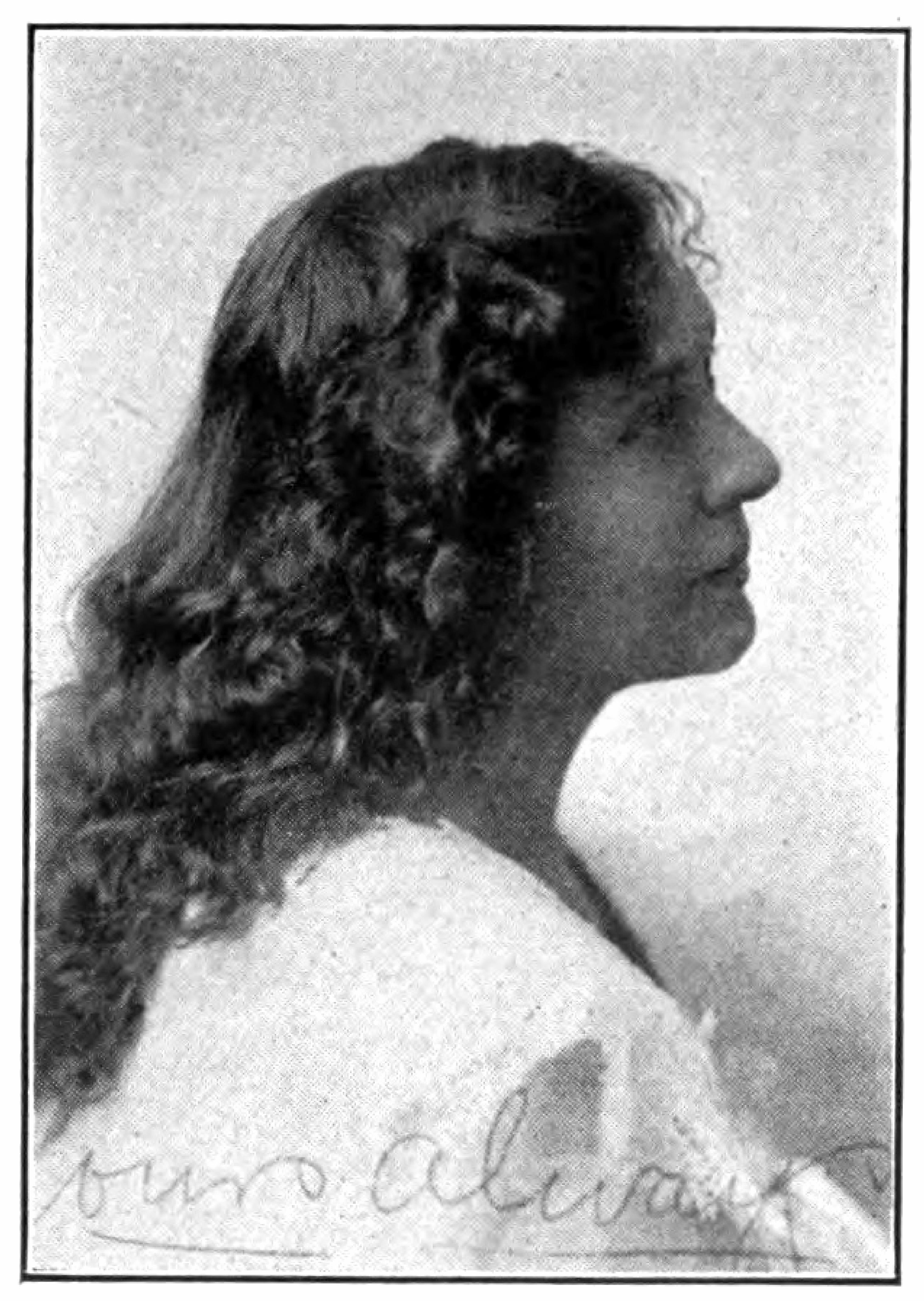
- Born: January 29, 1875; New York City, U.S.
- Died: May 13, 1953 (aged 78); Sherman Oaks, California, U.S.
- Occupations: Stage and film actress, screenwriter, film director
- Years active: 1903–1950

Cecil Spooner (January 29, 1875 – May 13, 1953) was an American stage and film actress, screenwriter, and film director.

== Biography ==
Cecil Spooner was born on January 29, 1875, in New York City. Her mother, Mary Gibbs Spooner, ran a theater in Brooklyn.

Spooner made her New York theater debut in 1903 in My Lady Peggy Goes to Town. She continued to appear on Broadway throughout the decade.

Spooner married Charles E. Blaney, who had written several of the Broadway plays in which she appeared, in 1909. That same year, Spooner made her motion picture debut in the Edison Studios adaptation of Mark Twain's The Prince and the Pauper. Spooner played the roles of the prince, Edward, and the pauper, Tom Canty. She was praised by a reviewer for Moving Picture World for her ability to convey the distinctions between the two characters.

In 1914, Spooner wrote, directed, and starred in the silent film Nell of the Circus.

On December 9, 1914, Spooner was arrested at the Bronx theater that she managed for "indecency." The police and the local community had taken offense to the play Spooner had opened the night before, The House of Bondage, and its treatment of "white slavery," a euphemistic term for sex trafficking. Spooner was released into the custody of her lawyer; she revised the play twice to remove the "objectionable" content, but the show ran for only eight performances and was reviewed negatively by theater critics.

Spooner appeared in several films in the early 1920s, and she returned to Broadway in the late 1920s and early 30s. Her last known acting role was in a 1950 episode of the TV show The Lone Ranger.

== Death ==
Cecil Spooner died on May 13, 1953, in Sherman Oaks, California.

== Selected filmography ==
=== Film ===
Year	Title	Role	Notes
1909	The Prince and the Pauper	The Prince - Tom Canty	short
1909	Hansel and Gretel	Hansel	short
1914	The Dancer and the King	The Dancer	short
1914	Nell of the Circus	Nell	also writer and director
1922	Family Affairs	unknown role	short
1922	Money or My Life	unknown role	short
1922	He's Bugs on Bugs	unknown role	short
1922	Peaceful Neighbors	unknown role	short
1924	The Love Bandit	Madge Dempsey	
1924	One Law for the Woman	Phillis Dair	

=== Television ===
Year	Title	Role	Notes
1950	The Lone Ranger	Effie Newton	episode: Never Say Die
