= Mitchell Lewis (actor) =

American actor

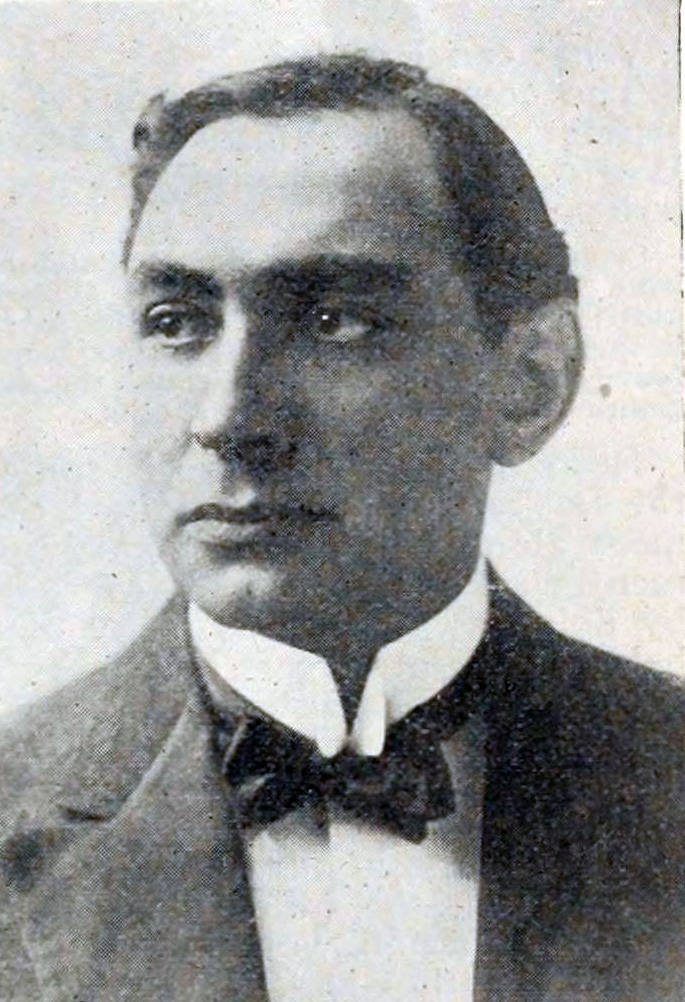
- Lewis in 1916
- Born: June 26, 1880
- Died: August 24, 1956 (aged 76)
- Occupation: Actor
- Years active: 1914–1956

Mitchell Joseph Lewis (June 26, 1880 – August 24, 1956) was an American film actor whose career as a Metro-Goldwyn-Mayer contract player encompassed both silent and sound films.

Lewis was born in Syracuse, New York on June 26, 1880. He appeared in more than 175 films between 1914 and 1956, although many of his later film roles were uncredited. At MGM, He played mostly supporting roles, including Sheihk Ilderim in 1925's Ben Hur in the silent era and Ernest Defarge in A Tale of Two Cities (1935) in the sound era, but his career would diminish to small uncredited roles like the Captain of the Winkie Guards in The Wizard of Oz (1939) and Pete, the Indian in Go West (1940) starring the Marx Brothers. Lewis' final film was The Fastest Gun Alive (1956), starring Glenn Ford and Broderick Crawford. He also served as one of the original board members of the Motion Picture Relief Fund, now known as the Motion Picture & Television Fund. Lewis died at age 76 in Woodland Hills, California on August 24, 1956. He is buried at Forest Lawn Memorial Park in Glendale, California.

== Selected filmography ==
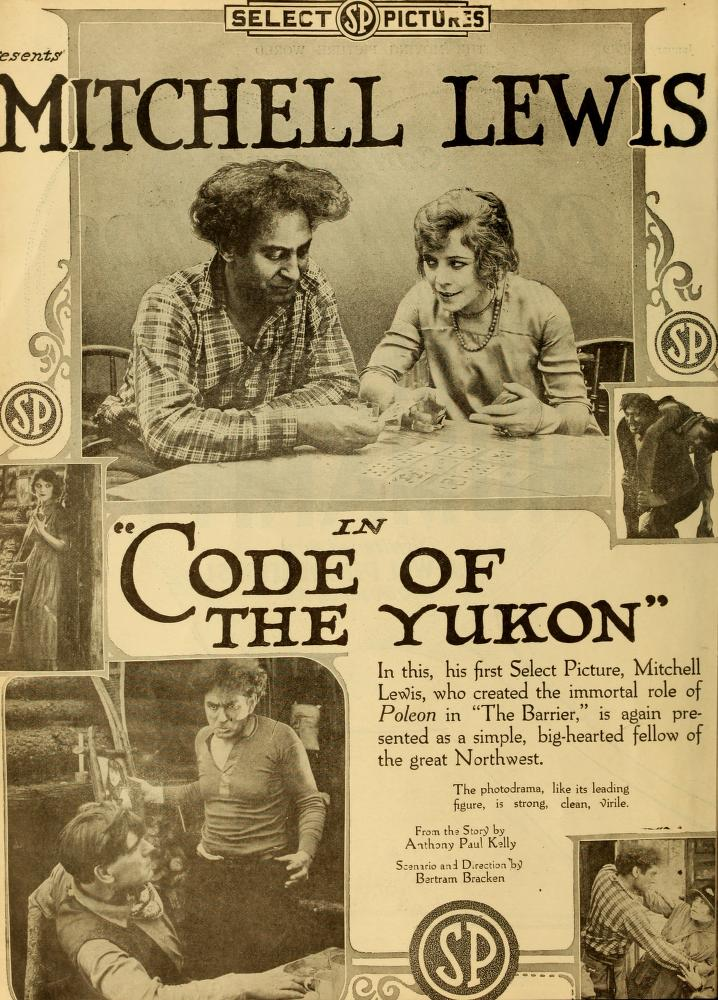
Code of the Yukon (1919)

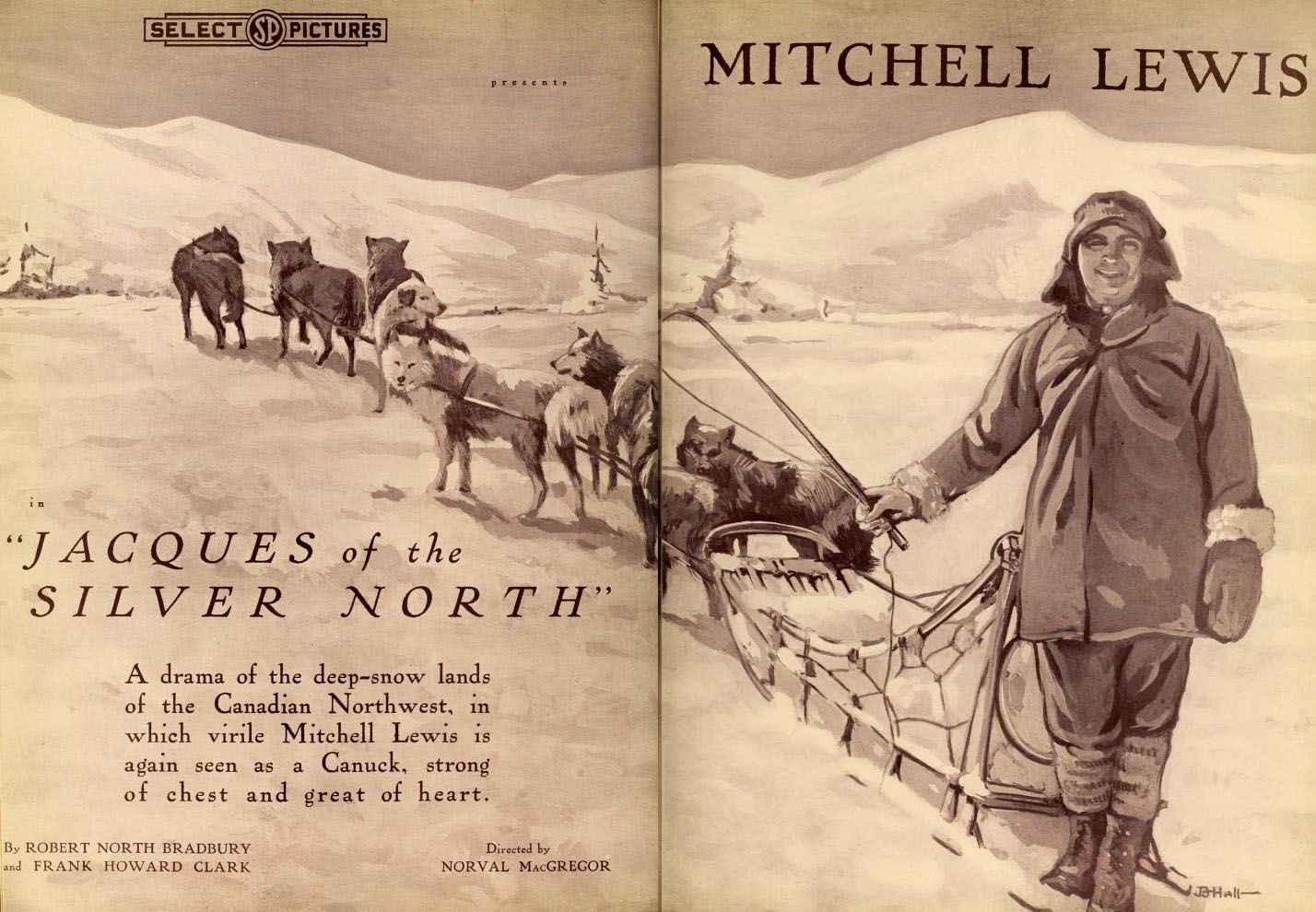
Jacques of the Silver North, 1919

- The Million Dollar Mystery (1914, Serial) - Gang Leader
- Zudora (1914)
- The Come-Back (1916) - Bully Bill
- The Flower of No Man's Land (1916) - Kahoma
- The Barrier (1917) - Poleon Doret
- The Bar Sinister (1917) - Ben Swift
- The Sign Invisible (1918) - Lone Deer
- Nine-Tenths of the Law (1918) - Jules Leneau
- Life's Greatest Problem (1918) - Big Steve Reardon
- Code of the Yukon (1918) - Jean Dubois
- Calibre 38 (1919) - Austin Brandt
- Children of Banishment (1919) - Dick Bream
- Fool's Gold (1919) - Marshall Strong
- Jacques of the Silver North (1919) - Jacques La Rouge
- The Faith of the Strong (1919) - Paul La Rue
- The Last of His People (1919) - Lone Wolf - a.k.a. Wolf Briggs
- The Mutiny of the Elsinore (1920) - John Pike
- Burning Daylight (1920) - Burning Daylight
- At the End of the World (1921) - Donald MacGregor
- Salomé (1922) - Herod, Tetrarch of Judea
- The Siren Call (1922) - Beauregard, a trapper
- On the High Seas (1922) - Joe Polack
- The Marriage Chance (1922) - The Mute
- The Woman Conquers (1922) - Lazar
- Her Accidental Husband (1923) - Old Blind Goring
- The Little Girl Next Door (1923) - Tug Wilson
- Rupert of Hentzau (1923) - Bauer
- The Spoilers (1923) - Marshal Voorhees
- The Destroying Angel (1923) - 'Strangler' Olsen
- Gold Madness (1923) - Soctty McGee
- A Prince of a King (1923) - Andrea, the giant
- The Miracle Makers (1923) - Bill Bruce
- Half-A-Dollar-Bill (1924) - Papeete Joe
- Three Weeks (1924) - Vassili
- The Red Lily (1924) - D'Agut
- The Mine with the Iron Door (1924) - Sonora Jack
- Flaming Love (1925) - Osner
- The Crimson Runner (1925) - Conrad (the black)
- Tracked in the Snow Country (1925) - Jules Renault
- The Mystic (1925) - Zazarack
- Ben-Hur (1925) - Sheik Ilderim
- Typhoon Love (1926)
- Wild Oats Lane (1926) - The Bum
- Miss Nobody (1926) - Harmony
- The Sea Wolf (1926) - Johansen, the Mate
- The Last Frontier (1926) - Lige
- The Eagle of the Sea (1926) - Crackley
- Old Ironsides (1926) - Pirate Chief (uncredited)
- Tell It to the Marines (1926) - Native
- Hard-Boiled Haggerty (1927) - Maj. Cotton
- Back to God's Country (1927) - Jean DeBois
- Beau Sabreur (1928) - Suleman the Strong
- Tenderloin (1928) - The Professor
- The Hawk's Nest (1928) - James Kent
- The Way of the Strong (1928) - Handsome Williams
- Out with the Tide (1928) - Captain Lund
- The Speed Classic (1928) - Mr. Thornton
- The Docks of New York (1928) - Andy, the Third Engineer
- The Devil Bear (1929) - Jack Crawford
- The Leatherneck (1929) - Court-Martial Officer
- One Stolen Night (1929) - Blossom
- The Bridge of San Luis Rey (1929) - Capt. Alvarado
- Linda (1929) - Stillwater
- The Black Watch (1929) - Mohammed Khan
- Madame X (1929) - Colonel Hanby
- Girl of the Port (1930) - McEwen
- Beau Bandit (1930) - Colosso
- Mammy (1930) - Hank Smith / Tambo
- The Bad One (1930) - Borloff
- The Cuckoos (1930) - Julius
- See America Thirst (1930) - Screwy O'Toole
- Never the Twain Shall Meet (1931) - Captain Larrieau
- Son of India (1931) - Hamid
- The Squaw Man (1931) - Tabywana
- Business and Pleasure (1932) - Hadj Ali (uncredited)
- The World, the Flesh, the Devil (1932) - Sukhanov
- New Morals for Old (1932) - Bodvin
- McKenna of the Mounted (1932) - Pierre - Henchman
- Kongo (1932) - Hogan
- The Secret of Madame Blanche (1933) - M. Duval
- Ann Vickers (1933) - Captain Waldo
- The Count of Monte Cristo (1934) - Vampa
- Marie Galante (1934) - Yermack - Steamship Crew Member (uncredited)
- Red Morning (1934) - Captain Perava
- The Best Man Wins (1935) - Joe Martini (uncredited)
- Oil for the Lamps of China (1935) - Skipper of Ship (uncredited)
- The Farmer Takes a Wife (1935) - Boatman in Office (uncredited)
- A Tale of Two Cities (1935) - Ernest Defarge
- The Bohemian Girl (1936) - Salinas
- Sutter's Gold (1936) - King Kamehameha
- Fatal Lady (1936) - Magistrate (uncredited)
- Dancing Pirate (1936) - Pirate Chief
- Anthony Adverse (1936) - White Man Whipping Slave (uncredited)
- Mummy's Boys (1936) - Haroun Pasha
- Espionage (1937) - Sondheim
- Waikiki Wedding (1937) - Koalani
- The Emperor's Candlesticks (1937) - Plainclothesman (uncredited)
- Big City (1937) - Detective Haley (uncredited)
- Conquest (1937) - Beppo (uncredited)
- The Bad Man of Brimstone (1937) - Jake Mulligan (uncredited)
- Arsène Lupin Returns (1938) - Detective (uncredited)
- Three Comrades (1938) - Boris (uncredited)
- Rich Man, Poor Girl (1938) - Man Who Yells (voice, uncredited)
- Mysterious Mr. Moto (1938) - Nola
- Stand Up and Fight (1939) - Cheating Gambler (uncredited)
- Idiot's Delight (1939) - Chief Wahoo (uncredited)
- Let Freedom Ring (1939) - Joe (uncredited)
- Sergeant Madden (1939) - Officer Minetti (uncredited)
- Bridal Suite (1939) - Hotel Runner at Train Station (uncredited)
- 6,000 Enemies (1939) - Prisoner Milky (uncredited)
- The Wizard of Oz (1939) - the Captain of the Winkie Guards (uncredited)
- Blackmail (1939) - Workman (scenes deleted)
- Bad Little Angel (1939) - Fireman Telling Wilks Tommy Went Into Fire (uncredited)
- The Secret of Dr. Kildare (1939) - Adam - Nora's Gardener (uncredited)
- Henry Goes Arizona (1939) - Rancher Bull Carson (uncredited)
- Young Tom Edison (1940) - McGuire - Train Engineer (uncredited)
- Strange Cargo (1940) - Guard (uncredited)
- 20 Mule Team (1940) - Barfly at Bar (uncredited)
- Florian (1940) - Horse Dealer (uncredited)
- Gold Rush Maisie (1940) - William Howard Taft Miggs (uncredited)
- I Love You Again (1940) - Sailor Yelling 'Man Overboard' (uncredited)
- Boom Town (1940) - Venezuelan Foreman (uncredited)
- Gallant Sons (1940) - Newspaper Buyer (uncredited)
- Go West (1940) - Halfbreed Indian Pete (uncredited)
- Meet John Doe (1941) - Bennett
- I'll Wait for You (1941) - Alfred 'Al'
- Billy the Kid (1941) - Bart Hodges
- The Big Store (1941) - Indian Father (uncredited)
- Honky Tonk (1941) - Man #1 Agreeing with Candy (uncredited)
- Kid Glove Killer (1942) - Restaurant Proprietor (uncredited)
- Rio Rita (1942) - Julio a.k.a. Pete
- I Married an Angel (1942) - Hotel Porter (uncredited)
- Cairo (1942) - Ludwig
- Apache Trail (1942) - Bolt Saunders (uncredited)
- Du Barry Was a Lady (1943) - Rebel Opening Door (uncredited)
- I Dood It (1943) - Greek Taffy Man (scenes deleted)
- The Cross of Lorraine (1943) - French Villager (uncredited)
- Whistling in Brooklyn (1943) - Bearded Baseball Spectator (uncredited)
- The Seventh Cross (1944) - Prisoner at Concentration Camp (uncredited)
- Kismet (1944) - Sheik (uncredited)
- An American Romance (1944) - Detroit Auto Works Technician (uncredited)
- Lost in a Harem (1944) - Slave (uncredited)
- The Thin Man Goes Home (1944) - Third Man Outside Barber Shop (uncredited)
- Main Street After Dark (1945) - Plainclothesman (uncredited)
- The Picture of Dorian Gray (1945) - Waiter (uncredited)
- The Harvey Girls (1946) - Sandy (uncredited)
- The Green Years (1946) - Smithy (uncredited)
- Courage of Lassie (1946) - Gil Elson
- The Mighty McGurk (1947) - Bartender (uncredited)
- It Happened in Brooklyn (1947) - Printer (uncredited)
- The Romance of Rosy Ridge (1947) - Southerner (uncredited)
- Song of the Thin Man (1947) - Jailkeeper (uncredited)
- Merton of the Movies (1947) - Set Guard (uncredited)
- Desire Me (1947) - Old Man (uncredited)
- Tenth Avenue Angel (1948) - Vendor's Bystander (uncredited)
- Julia Misbehaves (1948) - Railroad Manager (uncredited)
- The Kissing Bandit (1948) - Fernando (uncredited)
- Take Me Out to the Ball Game (1949) - Fisherman (uncredited)
- The Stratton Story (1949) - Conductor (uncredited)
- Border Incident (1949) - Older Bracero (uncredited)
- The Toast of New Orleans (1950) - Minor Role (uncredited)
- Dial 1119 (1950) - (uncredited)
- Two Weeks with Love (1950) - Mr. Schimpf (uncredited)
- Kim (1950) - Farmer Going to Ambala (uncredited)
- Inside Straight (1951) - Immigrant (uncredited)
- Mr. Imperium (1951) - Old Watchman (uncredited)
- The Painted Hills (1951) - Mark Miller (uncredited)
- The Tall Target (1951) - Sleeping Train Passenger (uncredited)
- Callaway Went Thataway (1951) - Studio Guard (uncredited)
- The Man with a Cloak (1951) - Waiter
- Lone Star (1952) - Senator (uncredited)
- Talk About a Stranger (1952) - Orchard Owner (uncredited)
- Scaramouche (1952) - Majordomo (uncredited)
- Washington Story (1952) - Spectator (uncredited)
- The Merry Widow (1952) - The King's Page with pistol (uncredited)
- Million Dollar Mermaid (1952) - Violinist (uncredited)
- Sky Full of Moon (1952) - Garage Owner (uncredited)
- Lili (1953) - Concessionaire (uncredited)
- The Sun Shines Bright (1953) - Sheriff Andy Redcliffe
- I Love Melvin (1953) - Stage Doorman (uncredited)
- A Slight Case of Larceny (1953) - Court Clerk (uncredited)
- Torch Song (1953) - Bill the Doorman (uncredited)
- Kiss Me Kate (1953) - Stage Doorman (uncredited)
- All the Brothers Were Valiant (1953) - Cook
- Gypsy Colt (1954) - Ed (uncredited)
- The Student Prince (1954) - Chess Partner (uncredited)
- Trial (1955) - Jury Foreman (uncredited)
- The Fastest Gun Alive (1956) - Tucker Eddy (uncredited)

== Notes ==
Although uncredited in The Wizard of Oz, he had several lines towards the end of the film, including: "She's dead. You killed her." "Hail to Dorothy! The Wicked Witch is dead!" and, in response to Dorothy's request for the late witch's broomstick, "Please! And take it with you!".
