= Little Miss Hoover =

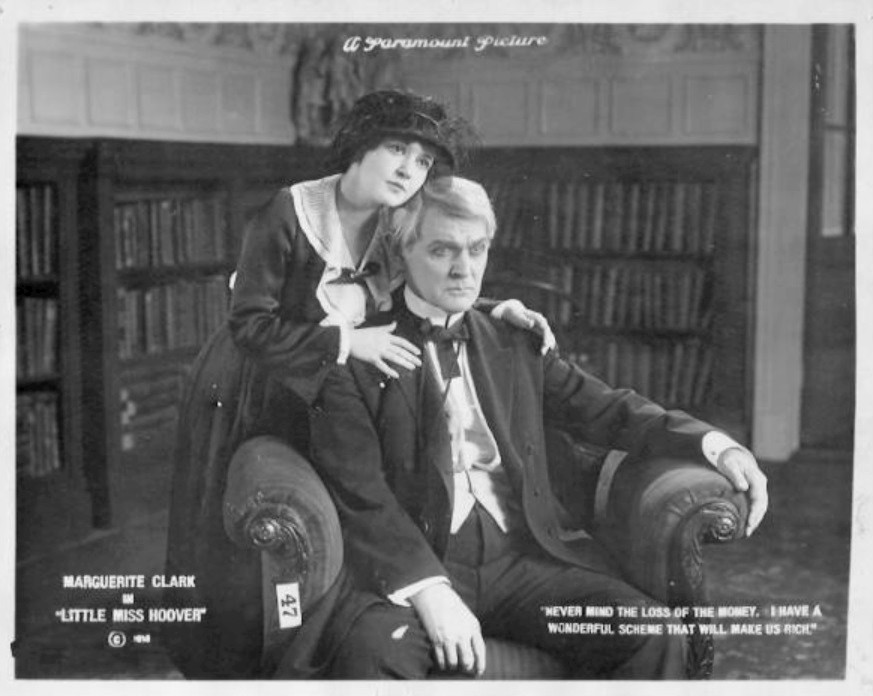
- Lobby card with Marguerite Clark and Forrest Robinson
- Directed by: John S. Robertson
- Written by: Adrian Gil-Spear
- Based on: The Golden Bird by Maria Thompson Daviess
- Starring: Marguerite Clark
- Cinematography: William Marshall
- Production company: Famous Players–Lasky
- Distributed by: Paramount Pictures
- Release date: December 29, 1918
- Running time: 50 minutes
- Country: United States
- Language: Silent (English intertitles)

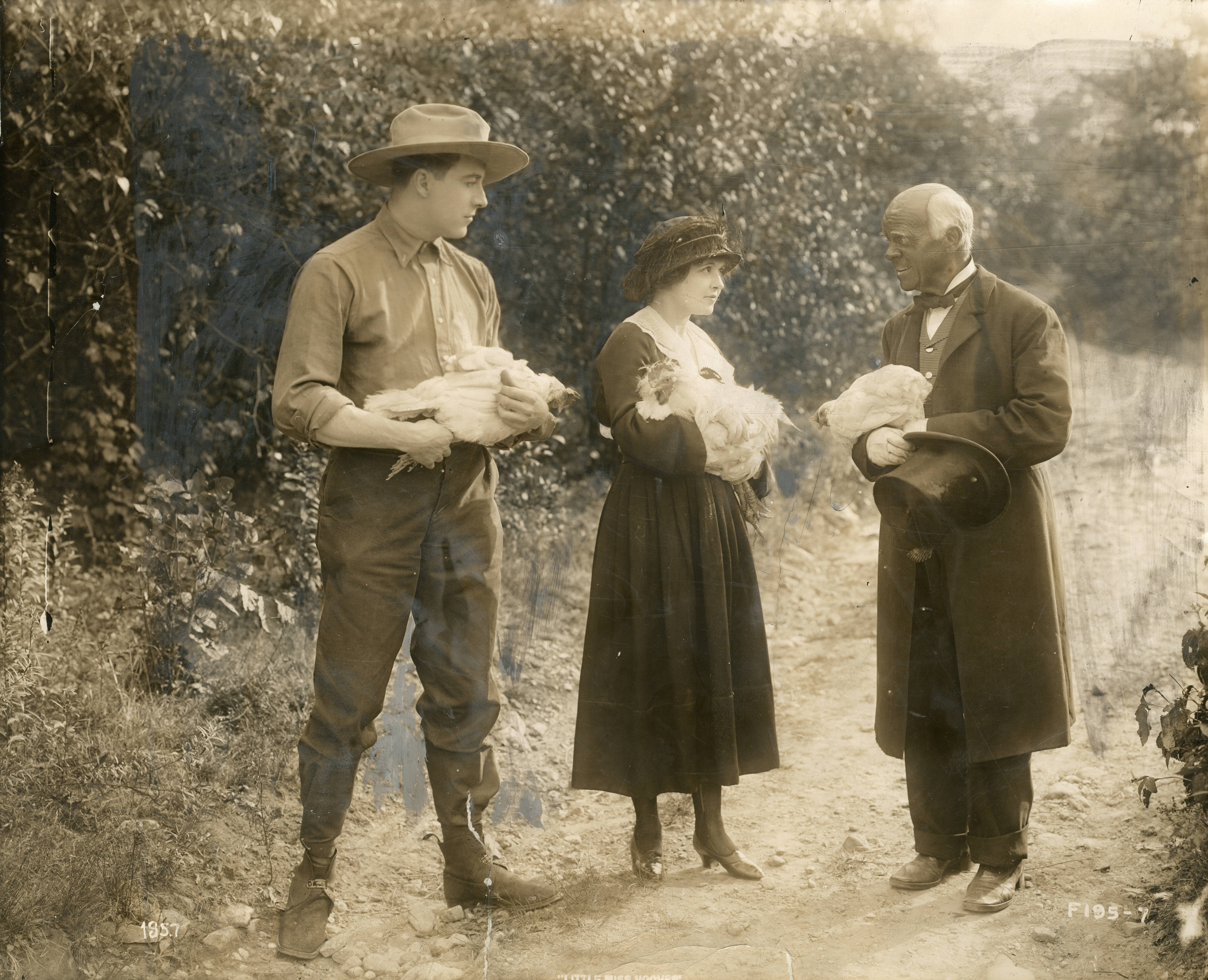
Film still

Little Miss Hoover is a 1918 American silent romantic drama film directed by John S. Robertson and stars Marguerite Clark. The film is based on the novel The Golden Bird, by Maria Thompson Daviess. A 35mm print of the film is preserved at the Library of Congress.

== Cast ==
- Marguerite Clark as Nancy Craddock
- Eugene O'Brien as Major Adam Baldwin
- Alfred Hickman as Matthew Berry
- Forrest Robinson as Colonel William Craddock
- Hal Reid as Major J. Craddock
- Frances Kaye as Polly Beasley
- John Tansey as Bud
- J.M. Mason as Silas Beasley
- J.J. Williams as Rastus
- Dorothy Walters (uncredited)
