= The Bar Sinister =

The Bar Sinister (aka:The Golden Woman)
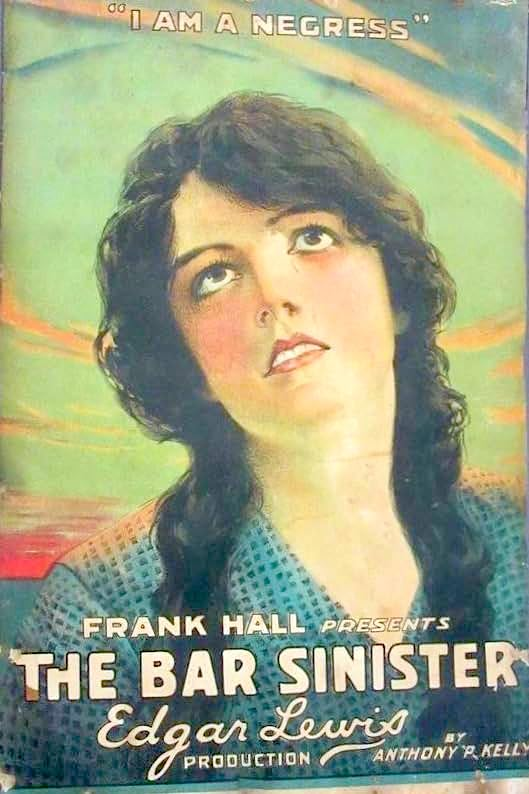
- Film poster
- Directed by: Edgar Lewis
- Written by: Anthony Paul Kelly
- Produced by: Edgar Lewis Productions
- Starring: Preston Rollow
- Cinematography: Edward Earle
- Music by: Frederick O. Hanks; Sol Levy
- Distributed by: State Rights
- Release date: April 26, 1917
- Running time: 8 reels
- Country: USA
- Language: Silent...English intertitles

The Bar Sinister is a lost 1917 American silent drama film directed by Edgar Lewis. An independent film, it was released on a State Rights basis.

== Story ==
The film is about a white woman who is part black (or negro as it was called). The semi-derogatory term and now archaic "bar sinister" meant a person who was half-breed or half-caste particularly concerning the issue of black/and white.

== Cast ==
- Preston Rollow - Col. George Stilliter
- Mary Doyle - Annabel
- William Anderson - Sam Davis
- Florence St. Leonard - Lindy
- Hedda Nova - Belle Davis
- Mitchell Lewis - Ben Swift
- Frank Reilly - Big Tom
- George Dangerfield - Luke Waller
- Ray Chamberlin - Nick Benson
- Victor Sutherland - Page Warren
- Jules Cowles - Buck
- William J. Gross
- William A. Williams
- Mack V. Wright
