= Out of a Clear Sky =

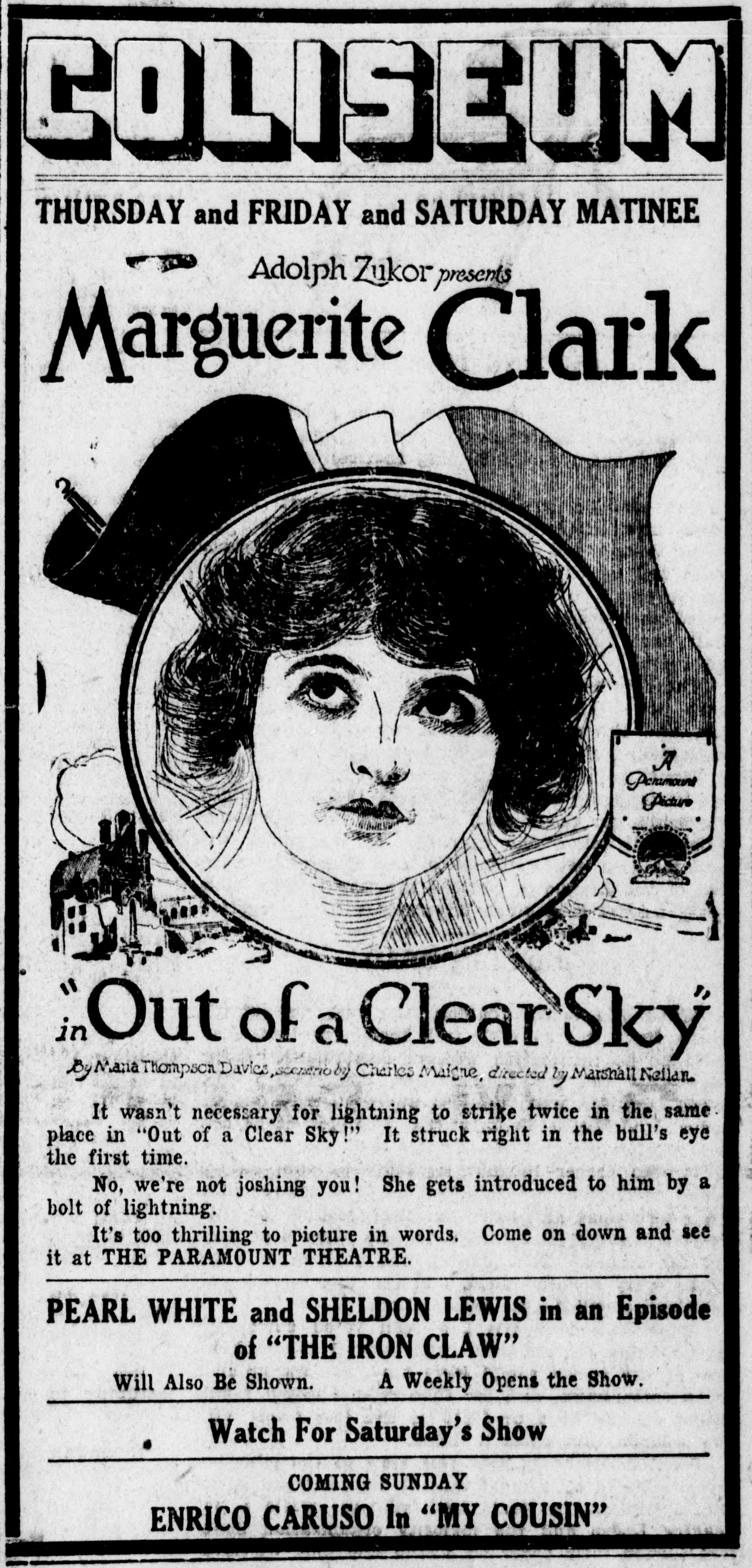
- Newspaper advertisement
- Directed by: Marshall Neilan
- Written by: Charles Maigne (scenario)
- Based on: Out of a Clear Sky by Maria Thompson Daviess
- Produced by: Adolph Zukor; Jesse Lasky
- Starring: Marguerite Clark
- Cinematography: Walter Stradling
- Distributed by: Paramount Pictures
- Release date: September 22, 1918
- Running time: 50 minutes
- Country: United States
- Language: Silent (English intertitles)

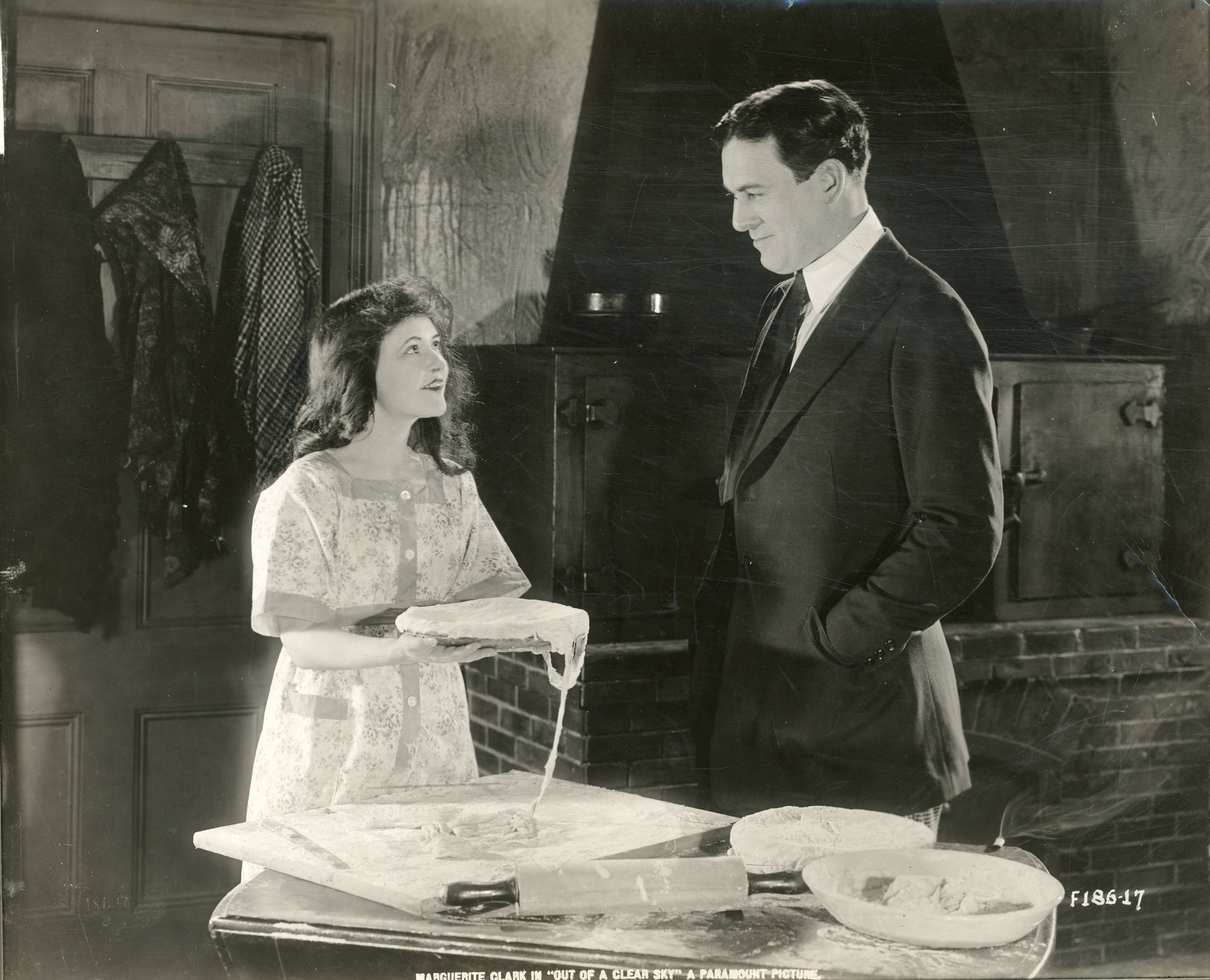
Scene with Marguerite Clark and Thomas Meighan

Out of a Clear Sky is a lost 1918 American silent romantic drama film starring Marguerite Clark and directed by Marshall Neilan. Based upon a novel by Maria Thompson Daviess, Famous Players–Lasky produced the film and Paramount Pictures distributed.

== Plot ==
As described in a film magazine, Celeste, Countess of Bersek et Krymm, a self-willed Belgian maiden, refuses to be used as a pawn of state to further the political ambitions of her scheming Uncle Dyreck, who has ordered her to marry a German prince. When he insists, Celeste slips away with her governess and steams to New York City. Uncle Dyreck follows and begs her to return to Belgium, but she refuses. She goes to Tennessee followed by her persistent relative, and ultimately finds herself alone and friendless in a mountain gorge. A prey to despair, she is discovered by Robert Lawrence, a wealthy land owner, who promises to help her. Learning that Uncle Dyreck is in the vicinity, Robert leaves Celeste and seeks him out to throw him off the scent. In his absence, Celeste goes to a cabin and is prevailed upon by a boy to visit his granny in the mountains. They scarcely had left the cabin when it is hit by lightning and destroyed. On his return, Robert finds fragments of Celeste's dress and believes she died in the cabin. He finds her later, and tells her that he can rid her of her uncle by showing him the charred remains of her dress and saying that she died. Celeste approves of the plan and Uncle Dyreck gives up his search. Robert and Celeste plight their troth.

== Cast ==
- Marguerite Clark as Countess Celeste de Bersek et Krymm
- Thomas Meighan as Robert Lawrence
- E. J. Ratcliffe as Uncle Dyreck (credited as E. J. Radcliffe)
- Bobby Connelly as Bill
- Raymond Bloomer as Crown Prince
- Robert Dudley as Father
- Walter P. Lewis as Steve
- Maggie Fisher as Granny White (credited as Maggie H. Fisher)
- Helen Montrose as Jane Forsythe
- Robert Vivian as Valet
- Nell Clark Keller as Mamie

== Reception ==
Variety gave Out of a Clear Sky a negative review, finding the acting to be competent but the story to be lacking. When describing the direction, the reviewer said of Marshall Neilan "It seemed as if the director regarded the story as hopeless and just trailed along."
