= Victor Sutherland =

American actor

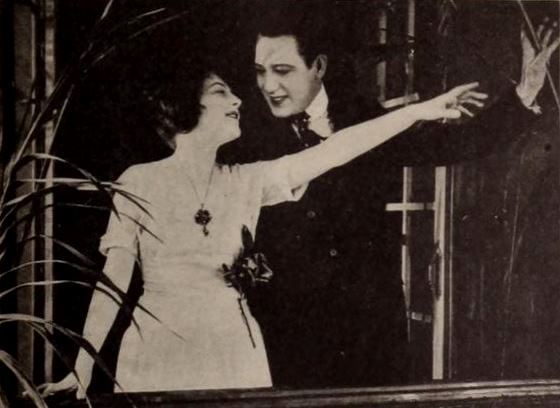
- Grace Valentine and Victor Sutherland in The Unchastened Woman (1918)
- Born: February 28, 1889; Paducah, Kentucky
- Died: August 29, 1968 (aged 79); Los Angeles
- Resting place: Forest Lawn - Hollywood Hills Cemetery
- Occupation: Actor
- Spouses: Pearl White (m. 1907–1914) Faye Cusick (m. 1915; div. 1923): Anne Hamilton; Linda Barrett

Victor Sutherland (February 28, 1889 – August 29, 1968) was an American stage, film, and television actor.

== Career ==
Born in Paducah, Kentucky, At age 19, Sutherland acted in a production of Dr. Jekyll and Mr. Hyde for 25 weeks.

Sutherland made films for Fox Film Corporation, among other studios, and he acted in stock theater.

== Personal life ==
On October 12, 1907, Sutherland married silent film star Pearl White in Oklahoma City. She sued for divorce in 1914. He married actress Faye Cusick on May 10, 1915, in Baltimore, Maryland. Cusick sued for divorce in 1923. He also married silent film actress Anne Hamilton, with whom he had a daughter, Anne Victoria Sutherland, in 1925, and actress Linda Barrett.

== Death ==
Sutherland died on August 29, 1968, at Crenshaw Center Hospital at the age of 79.

== Filmography ==
Year	Title	Role	Notes
1914	The Dancer and the King	The King of Bavarre	Lost film
1916	One Day	Paul I - Exiled King of Veseria	Lost film
1916	The Flames of Johannis	George	Lost film
1916	The Toilers	John Jameson	Lost film
1916	Daredevil Kate	Cliff Stone	Lost film
1917	The Barrier	Lt. Meade Burrell	Lost film
1917	The Bar Sinister	Page Warren	Lost film
1918	The Sign Invisible	Dr. Robert Winston	Lost film
1918	The Firebrand	Julian Ross	Lost film
1918	The Unchastened Woman	Lawrence Sunbury	Lost film
1918	Her Price	John Bradley	Lost film
1918	The Liar	John Carter	Lost film
1918	The Queen of Hearts	Jimmie Dreen	Lost film
1918	Buchanan's Wife	Harry Faring	
1919	Calibre 38	Ford Barton	
1923	The Valley of Lost Souls	Sgt. MacKenzie	Lost film
1924	The Love Bandit	Jim Blazes	
1945	The House on 92nd Street	Toll Guard	Uncredited
1950	The Sleeping City	Commissioner Holland	Uncredited
1951	The Whistle at Eaton Falls	Glenn Sewell	Uncredited
1952	Lone Star	President Anson Jones	
1952	The Captive City	Murray Sirak	
1952	The Pride of St. Louis	Mr. Kendall Sr.	Uncredited
1952	We're Not Married!	Gov. Bush	Uncredited
1952	Assignment – Paris!	Larry O'Connell	Uncredited
1953	Powder River	Mayor Lowery	
1954	Them!	Senator at D.C. Meeting	Uncredited
1956	Playhouse 90	L.K. Zimmer	Episode: "The Big Slide"
1957	Perry Mason	Clyde Waters	Episode: "The Case of the Drowning Duck"
1958	The Adventures of Jim Bowie	Colonel Whitby	Episode: "A Grave for Jim Bowie"
1960	The Betty Hutton Show	Franklin Carter	Episode: "Gullible Goldie", (final appearance)
