= The Crimson Gardenia =

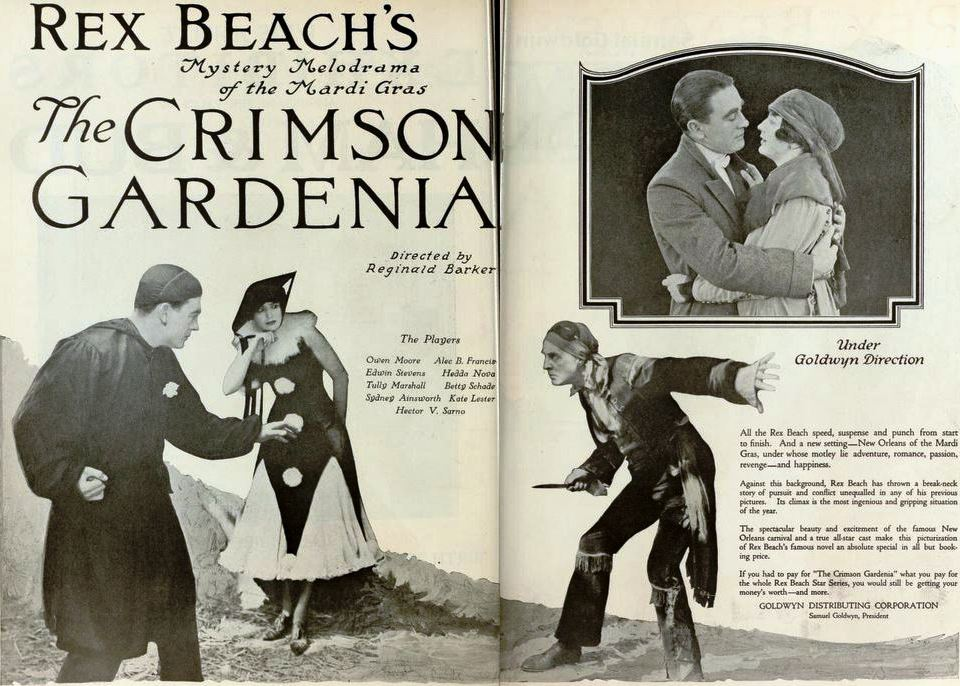
- Directed by: Reginald Barker
- Written by: Rex Beach
- Starring: Owen Moore
- Cinematography: Oliver T. Marsh
- Production companies: Goldwyn Pictures; Rex Beach Pictures Co.
- Distributed by: Goldwyn Distributing Co.
- Release date: May 18, 1919
- Running time: 6 reels (5400 ft)
- Country: United States
- Language: English

The Crimson Gardenia is a 1919 American silent adventure drama film directed by Reginald Barker and starring Owen Moore. Based on the short story of the same name by Rex Beach.

== Plot ==
Bored millionaire Roland Van Dam travels to New Orleans during Mardi Gras, where he is mistaken for an escaped prisoner named Emile Le Duc by his cousin, Madelon. She was told that Emile would be recognizable by his red gardenia, that coincidentally Roland also wears. Emile's gang kidnaps him, thinking that Emile had betrayed them, but he escapes. When the real Emile dies, Madelon is convinced by his gang that Roland is a secret agent and killed Emile, so she leads Roland to her uncle's home, who is the leader of the gang. Here she discovers that Roland is innocent and wants to escape with him. While being interrogated, he is able to convey the danger to a telephone operator who transfers the call to the policed. They are rescued and Roland marries Madelon.

== Cast ==
- Owen Moore as Roland Van Dam
- Hedda Nova as Madelon Dorette
- Hector Sarno as Emile Le Duc (as Hector V. Sarno)
- Sydney Deane as Papa La Forge
- Tully Marshall as Alfred Le Duc
- Sidney Ainsworth as Francois, "the Spider" (as Sydney Ainsworth)
- Edwin Stevens as Jean, the "Wolf"
- Gertrude Claire as Mere Felice
- Betty Schade as Eleanor Banniman
- Alec B. Francis as Mr. Banniman

== Production ==
The Crimson Gardenia was filmed on the Goldwyn Culver City lot, with the New Orleans sets designed by Hugo Ballin.
