= One Law for the Woman =

1924 film

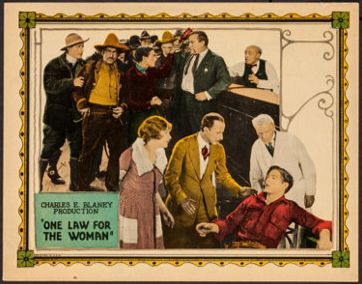
- Directed by: Dell Henderson
- Written by: Charles E. Blaney; Harry Chandlee
- Produced by: Charles E. Blaney
- Starring: Cullen Landis; Mildred Harris; Cecil Spooner
- Production company: Charles E. Blaney Productions
- Distributed by: Vitagraph Company of America
- Release date: May 25, 1924
- Running time: 60 minutes
- Country: United States
- Languages: Silent; English intertitles

One Law for the Woman is a 1924 American silent Western film directed by Dell Henderson and starring Cullen Landis, Mildred Harris and Cecil Spooner. An incomplete print exists in a private holding.

== Cast ==
- Cullen Landis as Ben Martin
- Mildred Harris as Polly Barnes
- Cecil Spooner as Phillis Dair
- Stanton Heck as Brennan
- Otis Harlan as Judge Blake
- Bertram Grassby as Bartlett
- Charlotte Stevens as Nellie

== Bibliography ==
- Munden, Kenneth White. The American Film Institute Catalog of Motion Pictures Produced in the United States, Part 1. University of California Press, 1997.
