= The Dancer and the King =

- Advertisement for the film
- Directed by: E. Arnaud
- Screenplay by: Edwin Carewe
- Based on: The Dancer and the King by Charles E. Blaney and J. Searle Dawley
- Produced by: Charles E. Blaney
- Starring: Victor Sutherland; Arthur Evers; Marquita Dwight; Cecil Spooner
- Production company: Charles E. Blaney Productions
- Distributed by: World Film Company
- Release date: November 30, 1914
- Running time: 5 reels
- Country: United States
- Language: Silent (English intertitles)

The Dancer and the King is a 1914 silent melodrama film directed by E. Arnaud. It was distributed by the World Film Company.

== Plot ==
The secretary of the young king of Bavarre sees and is impressed with a little girl. He watches her dancing in the street. When her father dies, the secretary takes the little dancer under his care and in time she becomes the premiere danseuse of the capital. The young king sees her and becomes infatuated. To win her, he showers attention and riches and in turn she pleads for the poor of the nation. The king grants her request, thereby incurring the enmity of the nobility, who lay all the blame for his acts at the little dancer's door. A plot is discovered, which will mean the death of the king, if it is carried out, but the dancer risks her life to warn him. The few that are loyal to him are able to incite the people to battle against the revolutionary army. Enraged at the failure of his plotting, the prime minister who has sought to supplant the king, realizes that Lola is responsible for his downfall and in the duel between the dancer and the minister, the minister is killed. Leaderless, the revolutionists are overcome, and the king weds the dancer, with general rejoicing on the part of the populace.

== Cast ==
- Victor Sutherland as the King of Bavarre
- Arthur Evers as The prime minister
- Howard Lang as Giles
- Marquila Dwight as The countess
- Cecil Spooner as The dancer

== Reception ==
A contemporary review in The Journal Gazette praised both Spooner's performance and the cinematography. The Bangor Daily News also praised Spooner's performance, calling her "a thrill at every moment".
