= The Light in the Dark =

1922 film by Clarence Brown

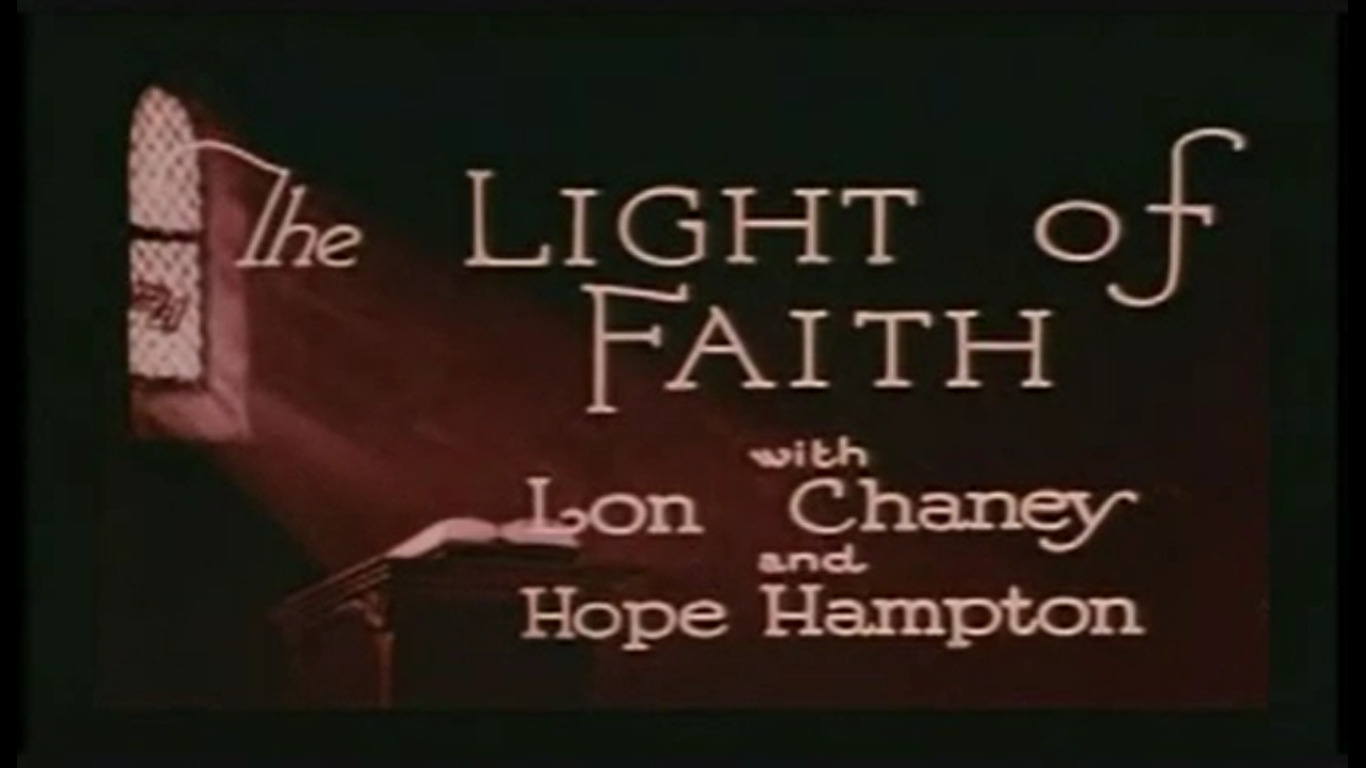
- Title Frame
- Directed by: Clarence Brown
- Written by: Clarence Brown (writer); William Dudley Pelley (writer)
- Produced by: Hope Hampton (producer)
- Starring: Lon Chaney; Hope Hampton
- Cinematography: Alfred Ortlieb; Ben Carré
- Production company: Hope Hampton Productions
- Distributed by: Associated First National Pictures
- Release date: September 3, 1922
- Running time: 63 minutes (7 reels, 7,600 ft.); 33 minutes (edited version)
- Country: United States
- Language: Silent (English intertitles)

The Light in the Dark (later re-edited into a shorter version called The Light of Faith) is a 1922 American silent drama film directed by Clarence Brown and stars Lon Chaney and Hope Hampton. It is around 50% lost. A still exists showing Lon Chaney in the role of Tony Pantelli. Some scenes (mostly showing the Holy Grail glowing) were filmed in Color.

The original 63-minute feature film was later re-edited into a condensed 33-minute version retitled The Light of Faith, that was circulated to schools and churches in the 1920s. A Rhode Island film distributor specializing in religious subjects acquired the film in the mid-20's and re-edited it to 33 minutes, retitling it THE LIGHT OF FAITH, which emphasized the subplot involving the Holy Grail. Thankfully, state law required that films for schools and churches (the major market for that distributor) be printed on the nonflammable safety stock, so this multi-tinted version exists today. That is the only version that has survived, since the full-length 63-minute version no longer exists. (There is a rumor that the full-length version has been recently found intact, but if it has, it has never been made available on DVD or video.)

Years later, a 70-minute reconstruction was produced by the International Museum of Photography and Film at the George Eastman House.

== Plot ==
Coat check girl Bessie MacGregor is struck by the car of wealthy society woman Mrs. Templeton Orrin, who takes Bessie into her home while she recovers. Mrs. Orrin's brother, J. Warburton Ashe, says he loves Bessie and flirts with her, but when she learns he isn't serious about her, she flees the home, heartbroken.

Bessie rents a room in a boarding house with her last dollar, then tries to find a job. Unable to find work, Bessie collapses from hunger one day in the boarding house in which she is staying. The landlady, Mrs. Flaherty and another boarder, a cheap hood named Tony Pantelli start to nurse Bessie back to health. Tony is in love with Bessie but hides his affections because he feels she is too good for him. A doctor diagnoses Bessie with a heart problem and tells her to remain in bed as much as possible.

Ashe, realizing he was wrong in his treatment of Bessie, has no idea where she has gone so he heads off on a trip to England to try to forget about her. During a hunting expedition, he finds a mysterious chalice in the ruins of a monastery that the locals believe to be the Holy Grail. Mrs. Orrin urges her brother to return home to find Bessie, and he brings the Holy Grail back to New York with him.

Seeing Bessie needs medical care, Tony Pantelli tries to raise money by stealing the chalice and selling it to a pawnshop. The police later recover the chalice in a raid on the pawnbroker's shop. News of the cup's mysterious healing powers, and the way it glows in the dark, reaches the newspapers. The police return it to Ashe, who keeps it in his home on a mantle shelf.

From her sick bed, Bessie reads about Ashe finding the Holy Grail in a newspaper. After Bessie tells Tony the legend of the Holy Grail, he steals the chalice, this time planning to use its magical powers to cure Bessie's heart failure. She touches the glowing cup and makes an instant recovery, but Tony is caught with the goods and put on trial for the theft. During the trial, Bessie and Ashe are reunited, and when Ashe has a religious conversion upon seeing the cup glow in the courtroom, he refuses to press charges against Tony who is released from custody. Tony leaves the courthouse heartbroken, after watching Bessie and Ashe embracing. Tony saved Bessie's life and reunited the two lovers, but at the end of the film, he walks out of the courthouse all alone.

Later, the pawnbroker, now in Sing Sing prison, confesses that the mysterious glow was from some radium he had placed in the chalice.

== Cast ==
(Some of these actors might not appear in the 33-minute version)

- Hope Hampton as Bessie MacGregor
- E.K. Lincoln as J. Warburton Ashe
- Lon Chaney as Tony Pantelli
- Teresa Maxwell-Conover as Mrs. Templeton Orrin
- Dorothy Walters as Mrs. Flaherty, the landlady
- Charles Mussett as Detective Braenders
- Edgar Norton as Peters
- Dore Davidson as Jerusalem Mike
- Mr. McClune as Socrates S. Stickles
- Joe Bonomo as Chaney's stunt double

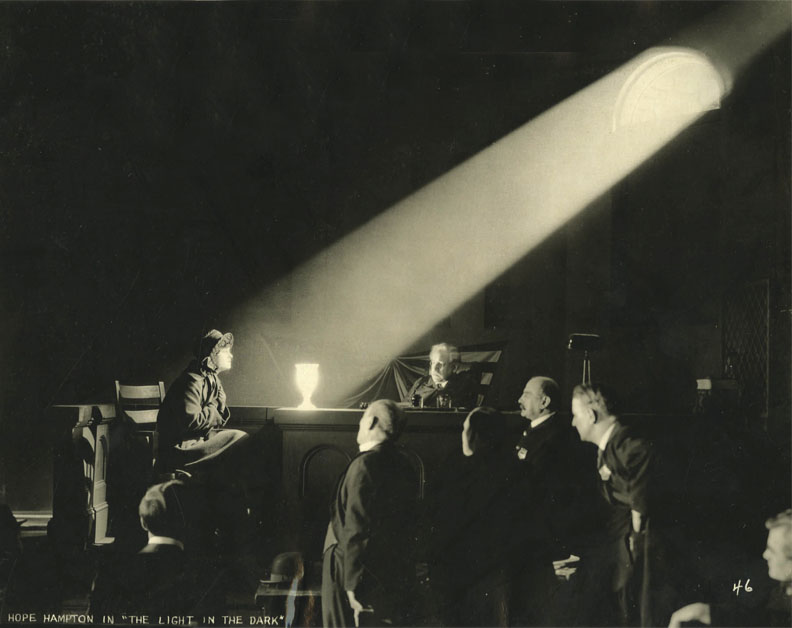
Publicity Photo

The Light of Faith

== Production ==
The Light in the Dark was filmed in New York City and at the Paragon studio in Fort Lee, New Jersey in December 1921. The world premiere was held at the Strand Theatre in Niagara Falls, NY.

== Reception ==
"In introducing the new process of color photography, Associated First National has made doubly secure an offering that from the standpoint of material and treatment promises to give wide satisfaction ... It has a penetrating theme and a symbolic beauty...Lon Chaney has the type of role in which he has proven exceptionally skillful. His is a real sympathetic contribution." ---Moving Picture World

"If its story possessed half the merit of its technical equipment, it might have proved a world-beater. It doesn't, so it isn't ... Mr. Chaney is a somewhat more kindly crook than is his wont, and Mr. Lincoln struggles along in the fat, but unconvincing hero role." ---Variety

"By all means the best picture in which Hope Hampton has ever appeared, The Light in the Dark has A-1 merits as a box-office attraction. Lon Chaney as usual is the crook par excellence and adds another striking portrayal to his gallery of characters." ---Exhibitors Trade Review

"(The film) is better handled by Hope Hampton than anything she has ever done. Lon Chaney, excellent actor that he is, does splendid work as an Italian who in a simple way loves the heroine. His work is very good."---Film Daily
