= The Street of Forgotten Men =

1925 film

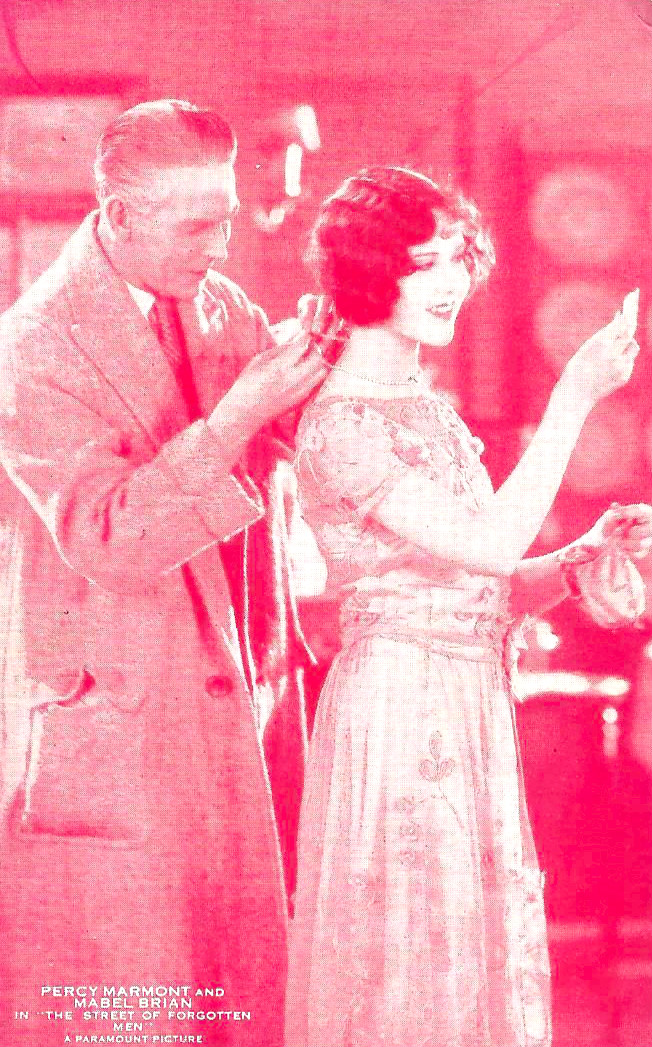
- Percy Marmont and Mary Brian on promotional card, c. 1925
- Directed by: Herbert Brenon
- Written by: Paul Schofield (screenplay); John Russell (adaptation)
- Story by: George Kibbe Turner
- Produced by: Adolph Zukor; Jesse L. Lasky
- Starring: Percy Marmont; Mary Brian; Neil Hamilton
- Cinematography: Harold Rosson
- Production company: Famous Players–Lasky
- Distributed by: Paramount Pictures
- Release date: August 24, 1925
- Running time: 7 reels (6,366 feet; approximately 82 minutes)
- Country: United States
- Language: Silent (English intertitles)

The Street of Forgotten Men is a 1925 American silent crime melodrama film directed by Herbert Brenon and released by Paramount Pictures. The film features the debut of actress Louise Brooks in an uncredited role.

== Plot ==
The Street of Forgotten Men (1925)

As described in the Exhibitors Herald upon its release, Portland Fancy, a bowery woman, dies, leaving her daughter of four in the care of Easy Money Charlie, a beggar who fakes a stump arm on the streets of New York City. True to his promise, Charlie rears the girl away from the bowery in beautiful environment, never confessing his faking method of earning a living. A beautiful young woman, she grows up to become engaged to a young attorney who is in a smart social set. Charlie tells Peyton, her fiancé, what a grafter he is and then departs for Australia. The young woman is married to Peyton on a night shortly after the secret return of Charlie, who is now thought dead. Charlie returns to his only way of livelihood after he has thrashed White Eye for trying to blackmail Peyton.

== Cast ==
- Percy Marmont as Easy Money Charley
- Neil Hamilton as Philip Peyton
- Mary Brian as Mary Vanhern
- John Harrington as Bridgeport White-Eye
- Juliet Brenon as Portland Fancy
- Josephine Deffry as Dutch Molly
- Riley Hatch as Diamond Mike
- Agostino Borgato as Adolphe
- Albert Roccardi as Adolphe's Assistant
- Dorothy Walters as Widow McKee
- Lassie as a dog
- Louise Brooks as A Moll (uncredited)
- Whitney Bolton as A Bum (uncredited)
- Anita Louise as Flower Girl (uncredited)
- Harry Lewis as saloon patron (uncredited)
- Elizabeth Meehan as woman on street (uncredited)
- John J. Kiernan as street car conductor (uncredited)

== Production ==
=== Filming ===
Production began on April 6 and finished around June 6th. The film was shot at Paramount's Astoria Studios in Astoria, Queens. Location shooting was done elsewhere on Long Island as well as on the streets of Manhattan, including on Fifth Avenue and at the landmark Little Church Around the Corner.

== Preservation ==
The Library of Congress has an incomplete print of the film, consisting of six of the seven reels. The reel which does not survive is the second reel of the film, which includes the deaths of two characters, Portland Fancy, and the dog taken care of by Easy Money Charlie. In March 2022, the San Francisco Silent Film Festival announced a major restoration of the film.

In 2026, Flicker Alley released Focus on Louise Brooks. It contained surviving material from The Street of Forgotten Men. Restored from a 35mm nitrate negative preserved at the Library of Congress, the film’s missing second reel has been reconstructed using film stills as well as text and dialogue based on a copy of the original script, preserved by the New York Public Library.
