= Foul Play (novel) =

1868 novel by Charles Reade

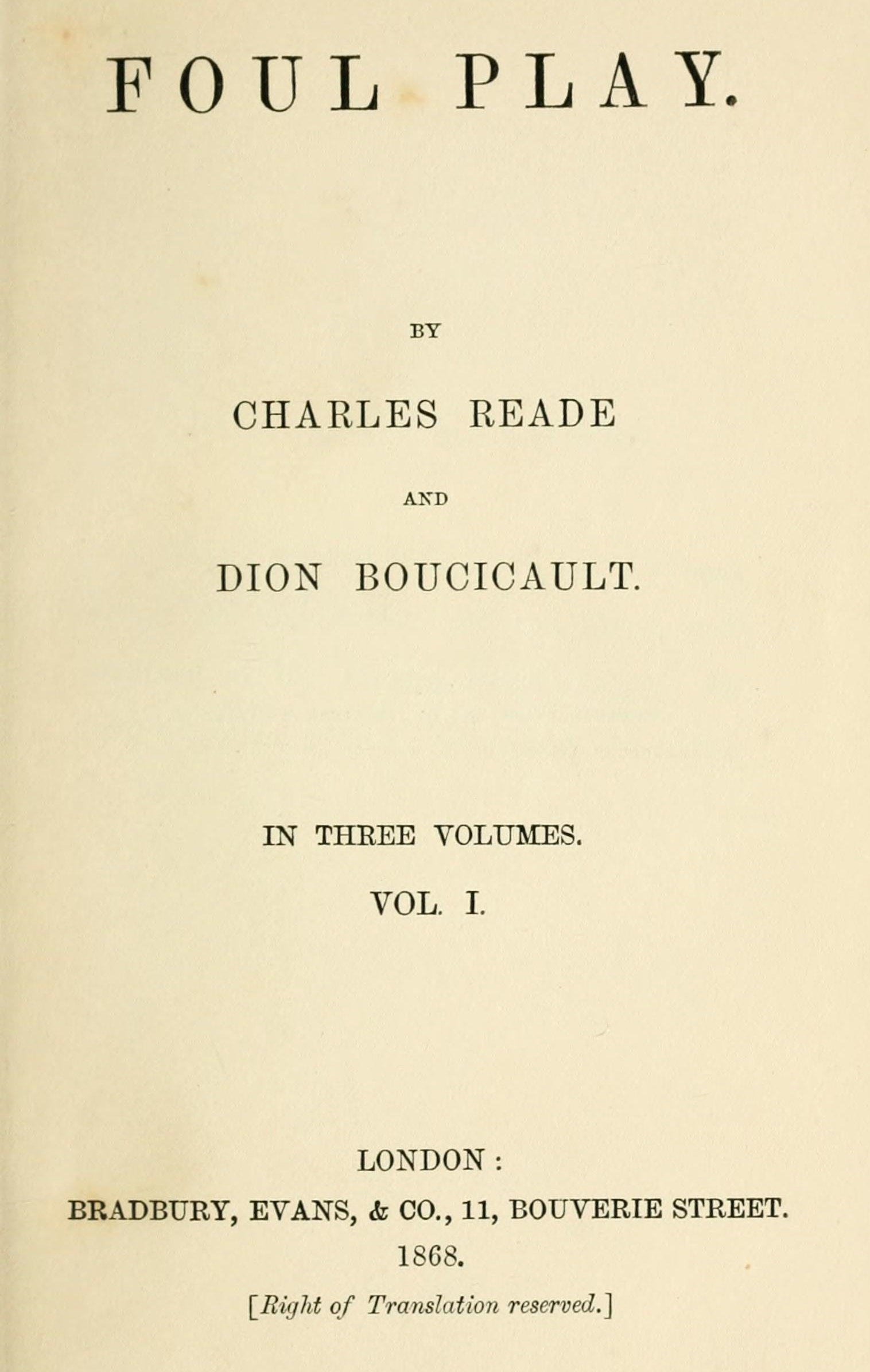
First edition title page

Foul Play is an 1868 melodramatic or sensation novel by the British writer Charles Reade. In Victorian Britain a clergyman is wrongly convicted of a crime and transported to Australia. He is shipwrecked with an aristocratic woman on the hitherto uncharted "Godsend Island" in the South Pacific. Eventually he is rescued and vindicated of his crime.

== Adaptations ==
In 1914 it served as the basis for the American The Ticket-of-Leave Man. In 1920 the novel was adapted into a silent film Foul Play directed by Edwin J. Collins and starring Renee Kelly and Henry Hallett.

== In popular culture ==
The residents of Edward Everett Hale's "The Brick Moon" ask Earth about Foul Play's ending, which they missed when launched into space.
