= Love Doctor =

Love Doctor may refer to:

- The Love Doctor, a 1929 American comedy film starring Richard Dix
- Love Doctor (TV series), a 2026 South Korean television series starring Choo Young-woo and Kim So-hyun
- The Love Doctor, a 1917 lost American silent comedy-drama film
