= Foul Play (1920 film) =

1920 film

Foul Play is a 1920 British silent crime film directed by Edwin J. Collins and starring Renee Kelly, Henry Hallett and Randolph McLeod. It is adapted from the 1869 novel Foul Play by Charles Reade.

== Plot ==
In Victorian England, a clergyman is wrongly transported to Australia for a crime he did not commit.

== Cast ==
- Renee Kelly ... Helen Rollaston
- Henry Hallett ... Penfold
- Randolph McLeod ... Wardlow
- Cecil Morton York ... Mr. Wardlow
- C. Hargrave Mansell ... Reverend Penfold
- Charles Vane ... General Rollaston
- N. Watt-Phillips ... Joseph Wylie
