= Edna Pendleton =

American film actress

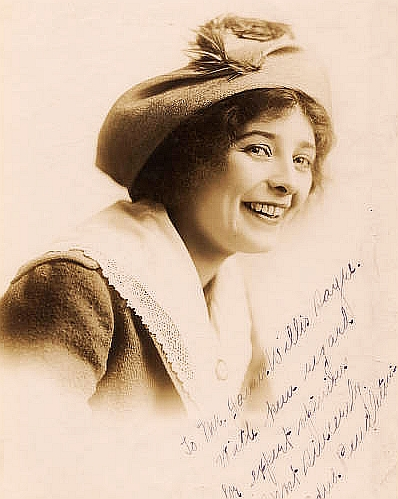
- Pendleton in 1915
- Born: June 6, 1887; Montana, USA
- Died: August 21, 1940 (aged 53); Seattle, Washington, USA
- Occupation: Actress
- Years active: 1915–1916
- Spouse: Johnny Powers (m. 1915, divorced)

Edna Pendleton (June 6, 1887 – August 21, 1940) was an American film actress. She played Aronnax's Daughter in 20,000 Leagues Under the Sea (1916), starring Allen Holubar and Dan Hanlon.

== Filmography ==
Year	Title	Role	Ref
1915	The Girl I Left Behind Me		lost film
1915	The Curious Conduct of Judge Legarde	Amelia Garside	lost film
1916	Artistic Interference	Ethel Miller	
1916	The Still Voice	Margaret Hamlin	
1916	Mignonette	Mignon	
1916	Held for Damages	Peggy O'Brien	
1916	The Girl Who Feared Daylight	Viola Dexter	
1916	20,000 Leagues Under the Sea	Aronnax's Daughter	
