= The Boomerang (1925 film) =

1925 film

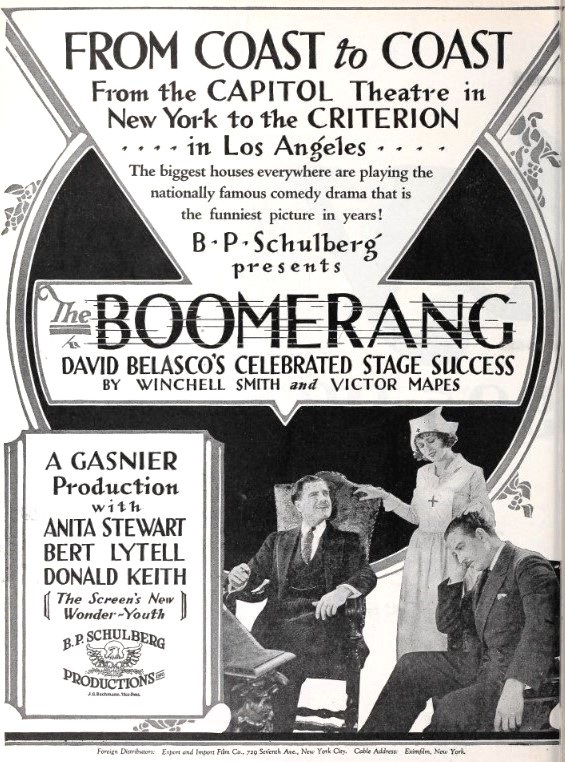
- Advertisement
- Directed by: Louis J. Gasnier
- Written by: John F. Goodrich
- Based on: The Boomerang by Winchell Smith and Victor Mapes
- Produced by: B.P. Schulberg
- Starring: Anita Stewart; Bert Lytell; Ned Sparks
- Cinematography: Joseph Goodrich
- Production company: B.P. Schulberg Productions
- Distributed by: Preferred Pictures
- Release date: February 28, 1925
- Running time: 70 minutes
- Country: United States
- Language: Silent (English intertitles)

The Boomerang is a 1925 American silent comedy film directed by Louis J. Gasnier and starring Anita Stewart, Bert Lytell, and Ned Sparks. It was based on a Broadway play of the same title by Winchell Smith and Victor Mapes, which was later adapted for the 1929 film The Love Doctor.

== Plot ==
As described in a film magazine review, Dr. Sumner, a love expert, engages Virginia as a trained nurse. She has been practicing as a clairvoyant. Poulet, her ballyhooer, plans to make a fortune by having her pose as the long-lost niece of Frederick Gordon, a wealthy broker. Preston DeWitt, the lawyer of Gordon, learns that Virginia is actually the lost niece, and attempts to become engaged to her. Failing in this, he tries to kidnap her. As the abductors try, they are overpowered by two other roughly dressed men. Lucy is thrown into a waiting automobile where the young doctor awaits her. The car soon comes to a halt in the country where the bandits level guns at the couple and order, "Kiss her. Kiss him." One bandit unmasks and proves to be old Gordon. He had known who Virginia was the whole time.

== Cast ==
- Anita Stewart as Virginia Zelva
- Bert Lytell as Dr. Sumner
- Donald Keith as Budd Woodridge
- Mary McAllister as Grace Tyler
- Ned Sparks as Bert Hanks
- Arthur Edmund Carewe as Poulet
- Philo McCullough as Preston DeWitt
- Winter Hall as Frederick Gordon

== Bibliography ==
- Connelly, Robert B. The Silents: Silent Feature Films, 1910-36, Volume 40, Issue 2. December Press, 1998.
- Munden, Kenneth White. The American Film Institute Catalog of Motion Pictures Produced in the United States, Part 1. University of California Press, 1997.
