= The Closed Road =

1916 film directed by Maurice Tourneur

- Directed by: Maurice Tourneur
- Written by: William A. Brady; Maurice Tourneur
- Produced by: Maurice Tourneur
- Starring: House Peters; Barbara Tennant; Lionel Adams
- Edited by: Clarence Brown
- Production company: Paragon Films
- Distributed by: World Film
- Release date: April 24, 1916
- Country: United States
- Languages: Silent; English intertitles

The Closed Road is a 1916 American silent drama film directed by Maurice Tourneur and starring House Peters, Barbara Tennant and Lionel Adams.

== Cast ==
- House Peters as Frank Sargeant
- Barbara Tennant as Julia Annersley
- Lionel Adams as Dr. Hugh Annersley
- Leslie Stowe as Dr. Appledan
- George Cowl as Griswold

== Bibliography ==
- Waldman, Harry. Maurice Tourneur: The Life and Films. McFarland, 2001.
