= The Great Problem =

1916 film directed by Rex Ingram

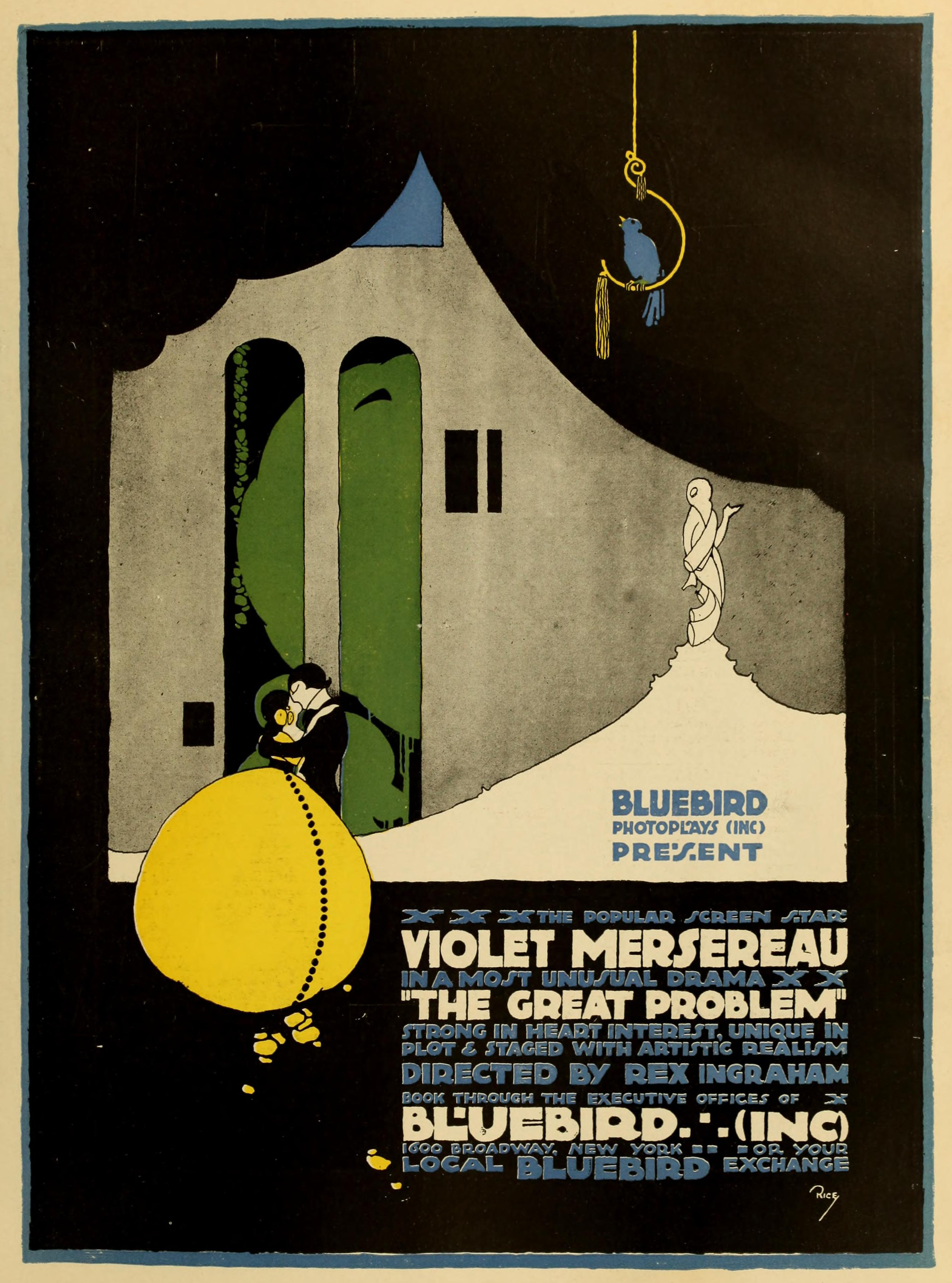
- Directed by: Rex Ingram
- Written by: Rex Ingram
- Produced by: Rex Ingram
- Starring: Violet Mersereau; Dan Hanlon; Lionel Adams
- Production company: Universal Pictures
- Distributed by: Universal Pictures
- Release date: April 17, 1916
- Country: United States
- Languages: Silent; English intertitles

The Great Problem is a 1916 American silent drama film directed by Rex Ingram and starring Violet Mersereau, Dan Hanlon and Lionel Adams. It marked Ingram's directorial debut of a feature film, having previously made a short. It was shot at Fort Lee in New Jersey. A complete copy of the film is held by the Museum of Modern Art.

== Cast ==
- Violet Mersereau as Peggy Carson
- Dan Hanlon as Bill Carson
- Lionel Adams as George Devereaux
- Kittens Reichert as Peggy As A Child
- William J. Dyer as "Skinny" McGee
- Mathilde Brundage as Mrs. Devereaux
- Howard Crampton as Joseph

== Bibliography ==
- Leonhard Gmür. Rex Ingram: Hollywood's Rebel of the Silver Screen. 2013.
