= R. J. Buckley =

English music critic, composer and author

Robert Johnson Buckley
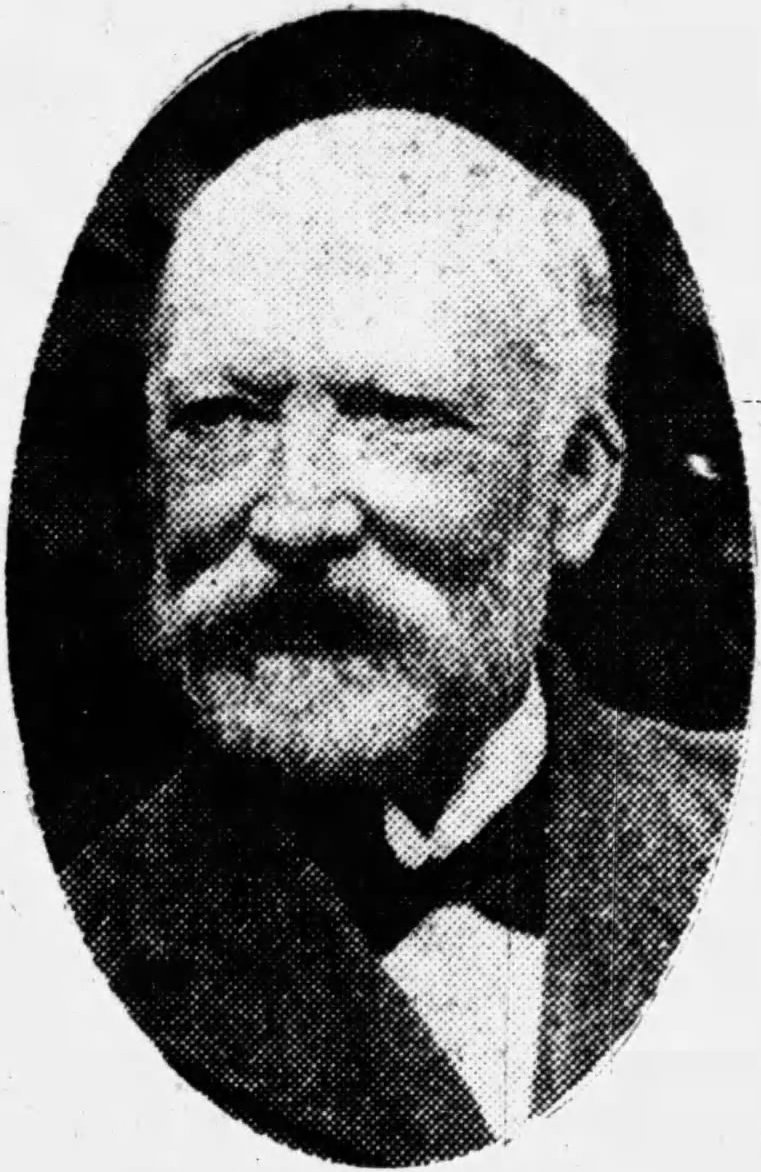
- Born: 1847; Monaghan, Ireland
- Died: 26 December 1938; Birmingham, England
- Occupations: journalist; organist; music critic; author
- Spouses: Mary Parke; Mary Rankin; Mary Wakelin
- Children: Robert Parke Buckley; Margaret Buckley; Gertrude Buckley; Jessie Buckley; Harry Buckley; F. R. Buckley

Robert John Buckley (FRCO), was born 14 July 1847 at Monaghan, Ireland was an English music critic, composer and author. He died 26 December 1938 at his home in Sandford road, Moseley.

Buckley was married thrice and had seven children. One of his children was film critic, writer, actor and BBC radio personality and Television presenter F. R. Buckley.

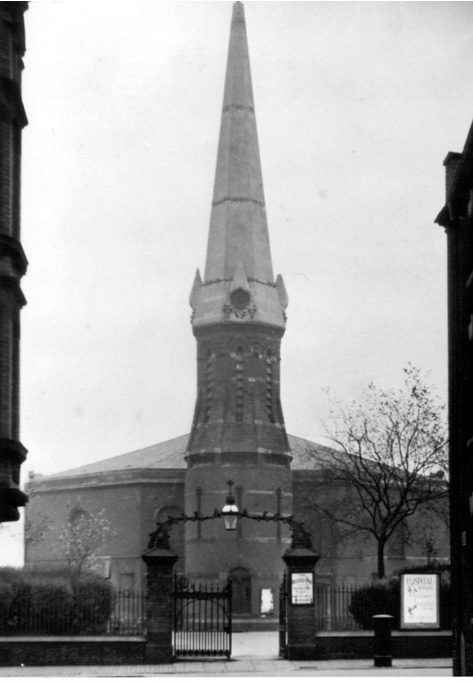
St Mary's Church, Gun Quarter, Birmingham

== Organist ==
Though claiming to have never had a lesson, Buckley was a Fellow of the Royal College of Organists as well as a church organist at St John's Church, Harborne (1874) and Smethwick in 1878. He was also organist at Holy Trinity, Bordesley and St Mary's Church, Whittall Street, Birmingham.

In 1887 he began writing for the Sunday Mercury, a series of short articles titled ‘’Pulpit and Pew’’ about popular contemporary preachers and it ran for 27 years.

== Chess ==
Buckley was the Librarian of the Birmingham Chess Club and wrote a chess column for the Sheffield Weekly Independent from October 1891 through at least 1893. and edited a column on chess in the Birmingham Weekly Mercury from 1889 to 1907

== Music Critic ==
Buckley was the music critic for the Birmingham Gazette from 1886 to 1926 when he retired. He had become known as "the doyen of music critics".

== Works ==
- 1904 "Sir Edward Elgar"
- "Ireland As It Is"
- 1902 "The Master Spy""
- 1912 "Granville Bantock: A Famous Musician at Home" The Pall Mall Magazine Vol. L July to September
- 1910 The Nation's Music Vol. 1 English.
- 1910 The Nation's Music Vol. 2 Scotch.
- 1910 The Nation's Music Vol. 3 Irish
- 1910 The Nation's Music: Vol. 4 Welsh
- 1910 The Nation's Music. Vol. 5 Sacred.
