= Listed buildings in Colton, Staffordshire =

Colton is a civil parish in the district of Lichfield, Staffordshire, England. It contains 13 buildings that are recorded in the National Heritage List for England. Of these, two are listed at Grade II*, the middle of the three grades, and the others are at Grade II, the lowest grade. The parish contains the village of Colton and the surrounding countryside. Most of the listed buildings are houses and associated structures, farmhouses and farm buildings. The other listed buildings are a church, the ruins of two previous houses, and a bridge.

== Key ==
Grade	Criteria
II*	Particularly important buildings of more than special interest
II	Buildings of national importance and special interest

== Buildings ==
Name and location	Photograph	Date	Notes	Grade
St Mary's Church; 52.78127°N 1.93087°W		Early 13th century	The oldest part of the church is the tower, the south chapel dates from later in the 13th century, and the rest of the church was designed by G. E. Street and built in 1850–52. It is built in sandstone with tile roofs, and consists of a nave, north and south aisles, a south porch, a chancel, a south chapel, and a west tower. The tower has two stages, diagonal buttresses, lancet windows, and an embattled parapet with eight crocketed pinnacles.	II*
Chimney stack, Littlehay Manor House, High Street; 52.78502°N 1.92144°W	—	16th century	The only remaining part of the former manor house is the chimney stack. It is in red brick on a chamfered plinth, with sandstone quoins, and has two star-shaped stacks. In the upper floor is a fireplace with a Tudor arch and a moulded surround.	II
Newlands Farmhouse; 52.79507°N 1.88902°W	—	16th century	The farmhouse was virtually rebuilt in the early 18th century. It has a timber framed core, with rebuilding in red brick, and has dentilled bands and a tile roof. There are two storeys and an attic, with a main range of three bays, a two-bay gabled cross-wing to the left, and a single-storey lean-to further to the left. In the gable of the cross-wing is exposed timber framing. The windows are casements with segmental heads, and there are two gabled dormers. Inside, there are two inglenook fireplaces.	II
Remains of Bellamour Old Hall; 52.78213°N 1.93743°W	—	Early 17th century	The house, which is now a ruin, is built in sandstone and is roofless. It has a chamfered plinth and is partly in two storeys. There is a four-bay front containing mullioned and transomed windows. The porch had two storeys and the doorway has a Tudor arch and a moulded surround.	II
Hamley House; 52.79150°N 1.92690°W	—	17th century	A red brick farmhouse that has a tile roof with coped verges, shaped kneelers, and ball finials. There are two storeys and an attic, and a T-shaped plan, with a front of three bays, and a rear wing. On the front is a gabled porch with a finial, here are two casement windows, and the other windows are sashes. On the right return is a canted bay window containing a door with a rectangular fanlight and a dentilled cornice.	II
Gate piers and wall, Hamley House; 52.79139°N 1.92712°W	—	Early 18th century	The wall encloses a garden to the southwest of the house. It is in red brick with stone coping, and is ramped down on each side. The wall contains square gate piers with ball finials.	II
Lea Hall Farm Cottage; 52.80283°N 1.93196°W	—	Early 18th century	A red brick house with a dentilled eaves band and a tile roof. There are three storeys and three bays. On the front is a gabled porch, and the windows are casements with segmental heads.	II
Malt House Farmhouse, Bellamour Way; 52.78219°N 1.92459°W	—	Early 18th century	The farmhouse was later extended to the rear. It is in red brick with sandstone dressings on a sandstone plinth, with quoins, a floor band, an eaves band, and a tile roof. There are two storeys and an attic, and a T-shaped plan, with a front of four bays, and a rear wing. The central doorway has a bracketed hood, and the windows are casements with lintels and keystones.	II
Barn and stables, Newlands Farm; 52.79526°N 1.88903°W	—	Early 18th century	The barn and stables are in red brick with a tile roof. They have an L-shaped plan, with a four-bay barn, and the stables at right angles. The barn contains full-height barn doors, doorways with segmental heads, two tiers of ventilation loops, a square loft opening, and pigeon holes The stables have two storeys, segmental-headed doorways and windows, an inserted cart entry, and two loft hatches.	II
Colton House, walls and piers, Bellamour Way; 52.78177°N 1.92856°W		c. 1730	A red brick house with painted plaster dressings on a plinth, with rusticated |quoins, coved eaves, and hipped tile roofs. The main block has two storeys and an attic and five bays, and there are recessed flanking lower wings with two storeys and two bays. Steps lead up to a central doorway that has Doric pilasters, a fanlight, and an open pediment. The windows are sashes with moulded sills, shaped lintels, and raised keystones, and there are three flat-roofed dormers. At the rear is a full-height bow window. Attached to the house are brick walls with stone coping running forward and ending in square piers with ball finials.	II*
Colton Mill Bridge; 52.76781°N 1.92929°W		Early 19th century	The bridge carries the B5013 road over the River Trent. It is in stone, and consists of a single semi-elliptical arch. The bridge has a parapet band, a plain parapet ending in square piers with shaped caps, and cast iron lamp holders.	II
Lea Hall Farmhouse; 52.80241°N 1.93102°W	—	Early 19th century	A red brick farmhouse with a dentilled eaves band and a hipped slate roof. There are three storeys and an L-shaped plan, with a front of three bays and a rear wing. The central doorway has a segmental head and a bracketed hood, and the windows are segmental-headed windows with moulded mullions and transoms.	II
Parchfield House; 52.77460°N 1.92624°W	—	Mid 19th century	A red brick house with a tile roof in Gothic style. There are two storeys and attic, and a south front of three bays, the right bay projecting and gabled. The central doorway has a canopy with pendants, the windows are casements with hood moulds, and there is a gabled dormer. The west front has two gables and two two-storey canted bay windows. All the gables have ornate wavy bargeboards, and the valances are similarly decorated.	II
