= Winifred Harris =

British actress (1880–1972)

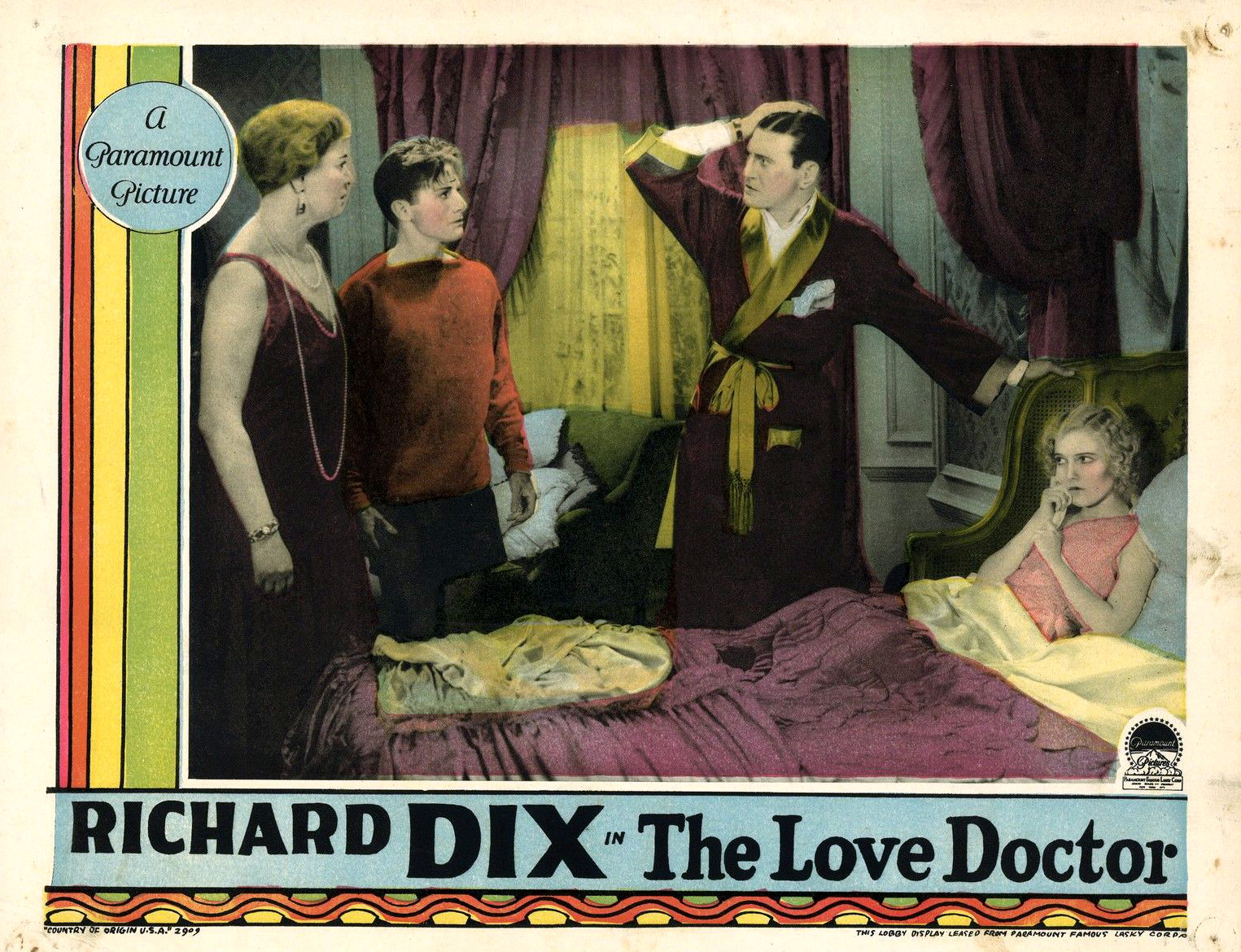
- Harris (at left) in 1929 movie lobby card
- Born: 17 March 1880; Surrey, England
- Died: 18 April 1972 (aged 92); Evanston, Illinois, U.S.
- Occupation: Actress

Winifred Vera Emily Harris (17 March 1880 – 18 April 1972) was a British actress with a substantial career in America. She appeared in New York plays beginning in 1914 and acted in numerous plays up to 1934. She left Broadway plays for films though she had begun her film career during the silent era. She was born in Kew, Surrey, England, UK and died at age 92 in Evanston, Illinois, US.

== Selected filmography ==
- The Crucial Test (1916)
- The Iron Hand (1916)
- The Co-Respondent (1917)
- The Dazzling Miss Davison (1917)
- A Daughter of Two Worlds (1920)
- The Woman of His Dream (1921)
- Belonging (1922)
- The Purple Highway (1923)
- The Love Doctor (1929)
- The Racketeer (1929)
- The Grand Dame (1931)
- Fast and Loose (1930)
- Ouanga (1936)
- Night Must Fall (1937)
- Kid Nightingale (1939)
- Rose of Washington Square (1939)
- A Child Is Born (1939)
- Mardi Gras (1943)
- The Lone Wolf in Mexico (1947)
- That Hagen Girl (1947)
