= All Sorts and Conditions of Men =

1921 British silent film by Georges Tréville

- Directed by: Georges Tréville
- Written by: Walter Besant (novel); Colden Lore
- Starring: Renee Kelly; Rex Davis; James Lindsay; Mary Brough
- Production company: Ideal Film Company
- Distributed by: Ideal Film Company
- Release date: 1921
- Country: United Kingdom
- Language: English

All Sorts and Conditions of Men is a 1921 British silent drama film directed by Georges Tréville and starring Renee Kelly, Rex Davis and James Lindsay. The film was based on a novel by Walter Besant, published in 1882.

== The book of 1882 ==
The novel All Sorts and Conditions of Men: An Impossible Story by Walter Besant, was published in 1882.

The book's "impossible story" centres on two wealthy young people, Angela and Harry, who, driven by social conscience move to East London, living incognito among the poor and serving them. Both characters had some degree of working-class family background with Angela's grandfather having been born in Whitechapel.

The book's setting, East London, was an area that had become a national and international byword for deprivation and hardship. Besant described East London as so socially and economically isolated from the rest of London, that it ought to be considered a separate city, albeit a neglected city, with few institutions to serve it, or represent its interests.

While other books concentrated on social problems such as poverty, crime, landlordism and alcohol abuse, Besant emphasised the joyless monotony of life in East London, a life with limited options for entertainment, leisure or intellectual stimulation.

"Surely there is no other city in the world which is so utterly without joy as this East London"

— Angela Messenger, the book's heroine.

Angela organises extensive communal tree planting on Whitechapel Road and establishes a dress-making co-operative, paying fair wages and offering other benefits such as longer leisure breaks where staff could, for instance, play tennis. The climax of the book is the fulfilment of Harry's dream to establish a "Palace of Delight" to provide education, recreation, entertainment and social improvement for the local people.

The book's title is taken from the Anglican Book of Common Prayer, with which most readers would have been familiar. In the prayer from which the line is taken, the congregation prays for all mankind, irrespective of distinctions such as social class. It is a reminder of the individual's obligation to social solidarity across divides.

The book would prove inspirational to many philanthropists, including:

- The founders of the People's Palace in Mile End, East London. The institution was modelled on the book's "Palace of Delight"
- The founders of the People's Palace in Glasgow.
- Arnold Hills, founder of West Ham United F.C..

== Cast ==
- Renee Kelly - Angela Messenger
- Rex Davis - Harry le Briton
- James Lindsay - Lord Jocelyn
- Mary Brough - Landlady
