= Tin Gods =

1926 film by Allan Dwan

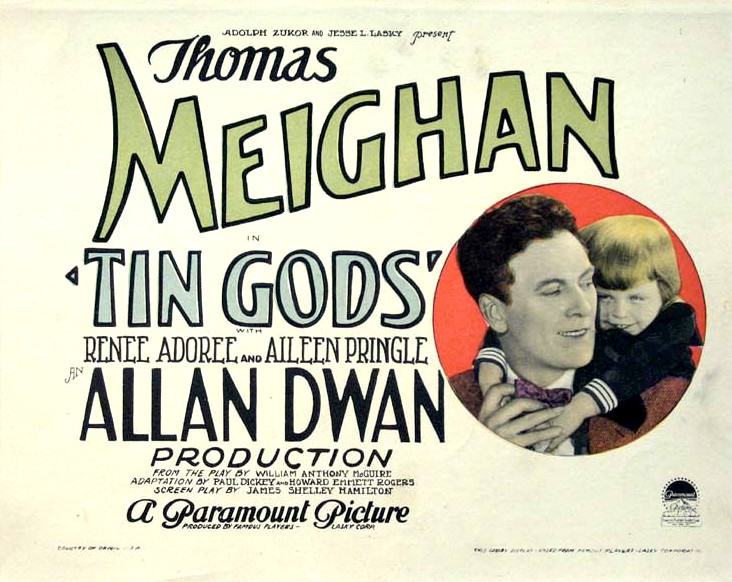
- Lobby card
- Directed by: Allan Dwan
- Written by: Paul Dickey (adaptation); Howard Emmett Rogers (adaptation); James Shelley Hamilton (scenario)
- Based on: Tin Gods by William Anthony McGuire
- Produced by: Adolph Zukor; Jesse L. Lasky
- Cinematography: Alvin Wyckoff
- Production company: Famous Players–Lasky
- Distributed by: Paramount Pictures
- Release date: September 19, 1926
- Running time: 90 minutes (9 reels; 8,568 feet)
- Country: United States
- Language: Silent (English intertitles)

Tin Gods is a lost 1926 American silent drama film produced by Famous Players–Lasky, released by Paramount Pictures, and based on the play Tin Gods by William Anthony McGuire. Allan Dwan directed and Thomas Meighan starred.

== Cast ==
- Thomas Meighan as Roger Drake
- Renée Adorée as Carita
- Aileen Pringle as Janet Stone
- William Powell as Tony Santelli
- Hale Hamilton as Dr. McCoy
- John Harrington as Dougherty
- Joe King as The First Foreman
- Robert E. O'Connor as The Second Foreman
- Delbert Emory Whitten Jr. as Billy
- Roy Applegate
- Louise Fazenda
- Gladys Valerie

== Preservation ==
With no holdings located in archives, Tin Gods is considered a lost film.
