= High Flyers (film) =

1937 film by Edward Cline

- Film poster
- Directed by: Edward Cline
- Written by: Benny Rubin (screenplay); Bert Granet (screenplay); Bryon Morgan (screenplay)
- Based on: The Kangaroos; 1926 play by Victor Mapes
- Produced by: Lee S. Marcus; Samuel J. Briskin (executive producer)
- Starring: Bert Wheeler; Robert Woolsey; Lupe Vélez; Marjorie Lord; Margaret Dumont
- Cinematography: Jack MacKenzie
- Edited by: John Lockert
- Music by: Roy Webb
- Production company: RKO Radio Pictures
- Distributed by: RKO Radio Pictures
- Release date: November 26, 1937
- Running time: 70 minutes
- Country: United States
- Language: English

High Flyers (aka The Kangaroos) is a 1937 American musical comedy film directed by Edward Cline and starring the comedy team of Wheeler & Woolsey in their final film together. Robert Woolsey died less than a year after the film was released. The supporting cast includes Lupe Vélez, Margaret Dumont, Marjorie Lord, Paul Harvey and Jack Carson. The film was produced and distributed by RKO Pictures.

== Plot ==
Jeremiah "Jerry" Lane and Pierre Potkin are a couple of midway "pilots" on a carnival ride who have never actually been in the air. The duo leave their job when they are hired by smuggler Dave Hanlon to fly a real seaplane (not knowing it is a stolen police aircraft) in order to retrieve a lifesaver thrown from an ocean liner and deliver it to him. They think that the lifesaver contains news photos, but inside it they soon find cocaine, (Note: The censor board refused to allow Wheeler and Woolsey to become intoxicated by cocaine in the film. As a result, the powder is not actually named.) which blows in their faces and intoxicates them, and a box of stolen jewels. Jerry and Pierre eventually crash-land on the Arlington estate, owned by Horace and Martha Arlington.

Initially, the Arlingtons believe that the duo are police officers, and readily allow them to stay in their home. In a series of musical numbers, the two flirt outrageously with the Arlingtons' daughter Arlene, and their maid Juanita.

Unfortunately, the Arlingtons are good friends with Hanlon. When Hanlon is informed that Jerry and Pierre are at the Arlington estate, he convinces the family that the two men are lunatics from an asylum. Arlene and Juanita then attempt to humor than until the "doctors" (actually Hanlon's cronies) can come and remove them.

Hanlon and the "doctors" show up at the mansion in order to "bump off" Jerry and Pierre, and get the smuggled jewels. However, like many other small items that have gone missing over the preceding weeks, the jewels have been hidden by the Arlingtons' kleptomaniac dog. A frantic and confusing search around the manor soon occurs, with dozens of cops added into the mix.

Eventually the criminals are captured, but when Horace examines the jewels he finds they are paste. However, an explanation is in the box, from the man who was carrying them on the ship: suspecting a crime was being planned, he had switched the jewels and arranged for the real ones to be sent to Arlington's office.

== Cast ==
- Bert Wheeler as Jeremiah "Jerry" Lane
- Robert Woolsey as Pierrie Potkin
- Lupe Vélez as Juanita, the Maid
- Marjorie Lord as Arlene Arlington
- Margaret Dumont as Martha Arlington
- Jack Carson as Dave Hanlon
- Paul Harvey as Horace Arlington
- Charles Judels as Mr. Fontaine
- Lucien Prival as Mr. Panzer
- Herbert Evans as Mr. Hartley
- Herbert Clifton as Stone, The Butler
- George Irving as Chief of Police
- Stanley Blystone as Cop on Pier (uncredited)

== Production ==
High Flyers was based on the 1926 Broadway play The Kangaroos by Victor Mapes; The Kangaroos was also the working title of the film. In February 1937, The Hollywood Reporter announced that Betty Grable was to be the film's star, but Lupe Velez, a well established comic actress, took the lead role. As in the previous Wheeler and Woolsey film, On Again-Off Again (1937), and throughout production of this film, Robert Woolsey was suffering from kidney disease. Although it occurs in the middle of High Flyers, the "I'm a Gaucho" musical number with Woolsey and Lupe Vélez would be the last scene he shot. Ultimately, this would be Wheeler and Woolsey's last film.

After Robert Woolsey's death, Bert Wheeler would continue to work regularly on the stage, and later did four more films (two features and two shorts). He would also occasionally appear on television well into the 1960s, most notably as "Smokey Joe" in the short-lived series Brave Eagle. At one point in the film, Wheeler does an impersonation of Charlie Chaplin. Wheeler's Chaplin impersonation was a part of his stage act before he teamed with Robert Woolsey, and Chaplin himself was very fond of Wheeler's impersonation of him. Lupe Velez's imitations of Dolores del Río, Shirley Temple, Marlene Dietrich and Simone Simon, were also featured.

The aircraft in the film was a Sikorsky S-39B, an American light amphibious aircraft.

== Reception ==
Although the film is generally considered one of the team's lesser efforts, reviewers at the time gave Wheeler and Woolsey credit for rising above the script. Harrison's Reports: "Entertainment strictly for the Wheeler and Woolsey fans. Everyone concerned tries hard, but they cannot do much with the poor material given them." Motion Picture Herald: "Comedy that provokes laughter, even though some of it in action, situations, dialogue, and effects is quite ridiculous, is the dominating quality. As hokum is concentrated upon, High Flyers measures up as a satisfactory audience picture." Film Daily: "It is all riotous nonsense, but the comics score with some laughable gags and business, and Lupe Velez proves herself a real comedienne, and very delightful."

TV Guide in a later one-star review of High Flyers was less than kind: "A barely passable Wheeler-Woolsey effort in which the comic pair pose as flyers and find themselves in the center of a jewel-smuggling ring. When the gang of thieves take to the air, they are dim-wittedly nabbed by the amateur pilots. You've seen it all before, and for the last time with this comedy team – Woolsey died about a year after this film's release."
