= The Bigger Man =

1915 film

The Bigger Man (aka:The Better Man)
- Directed by: John W. Noble
- Based on: play The Bridge by Rupert Hughes c.1909
- Produced by: B. A. Rolfe
- Starring: Henry Kolker
- Cinematography: Herbert Oswald
- Distributed by: Metro Pictures
- Release date: September 20, 1915
- Running time: 5 reels
- Country: USA
- Language: Silent..English titles

The Bigger Man is a lost 1915 silent film drama directed by John W. Noble and starring Henry Kolker, a stage star.

== Cast ==
- Henry Kolker - John Stoddard
- Renee Kelly - Janet Van Nest
- Orlando Daly - Courtlandt Van Nest
- Elsie Balfour - Edith Stoddard
- J. H. Goldsworthy - Kenneth Stuyvesant
- Mayme Kelso - Aunt Sarah
- Edwin Boring - Lavinsky
- Richard Lee - Sevic
