= Roy Applegate =

American actor

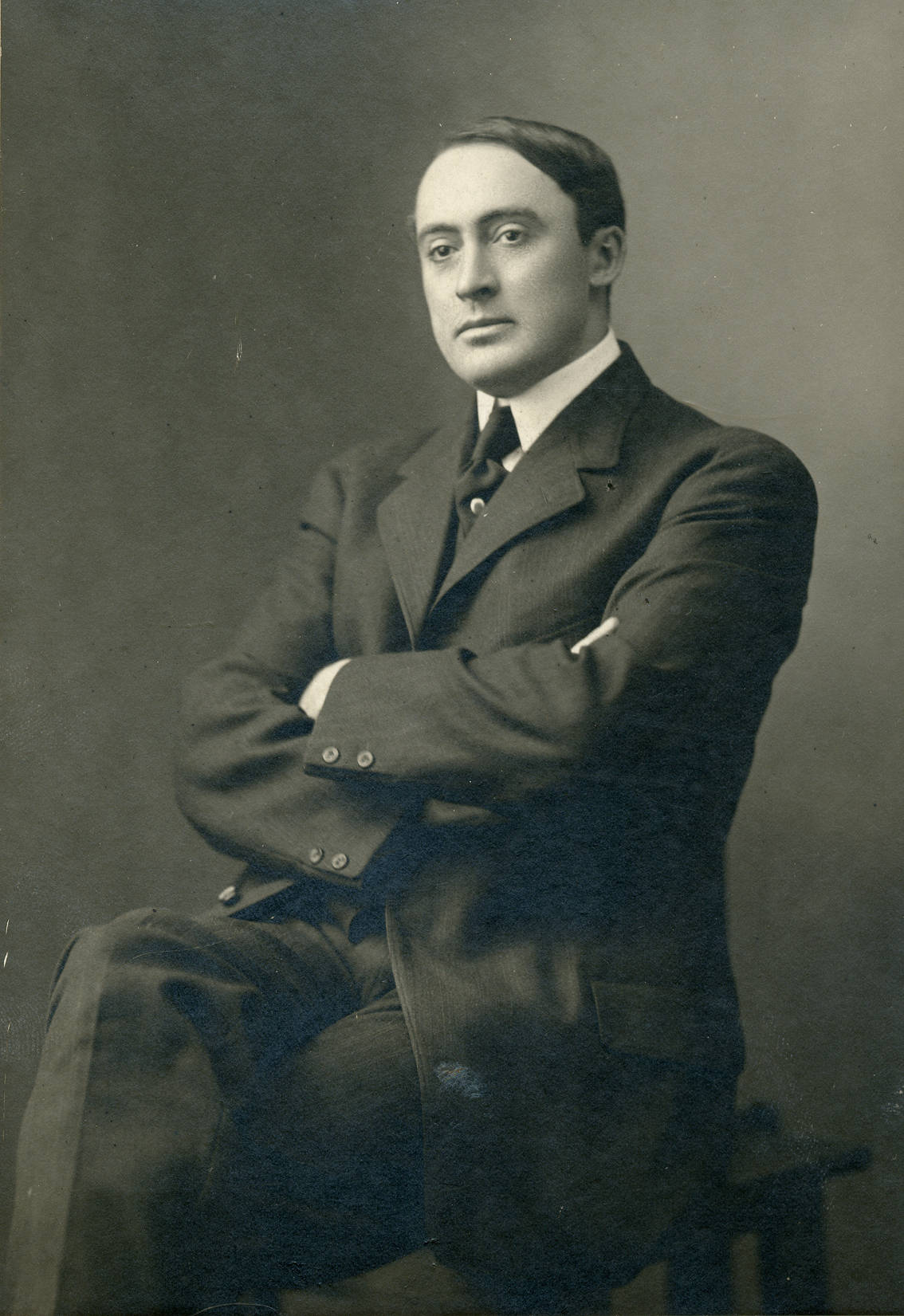
- Applegate in 1907
- Born: December 7, 1878; Upper Black Eddy, Pennsylvania, U.S.
- Died: February 9, 1950 (aged 71); Catasauqua, Pennsylvania, U.S.
- Occupation: Film actor

Roy Applegate (7 December 1878 – 9 February 1950) was an American actor

== Early life ==
Applegate was born on 7 December 1878 in Upper Black Eddy, in Bucks County, Pennsylvania. He was a veteran of the Spanish–American War, having served in Company B of the 4th Pennsylvania Infantry Regiment from 2 August 1898 until his honorable discharge on 16 November 1898.

== Background ==
He played Judge Gates in The Child of Destiny (1916), Opera House Manager in The Musician's Daughter (1911), Arthur Jepson in All for a Girl (1915), Simon Legree in Uncle Tom's Cabin (1914), Mackenzie in A Man's Law (1918), and Detective in Sally of the Sawdust (1925). He also appeared in The Curious Conduct of Judge Legarde (1915).

== Death ==
He was reported missing since February 9, 1950, and found dead in the bathroom of his home by his sister and brother-in-law due to a heart attack.

== Filmography ==
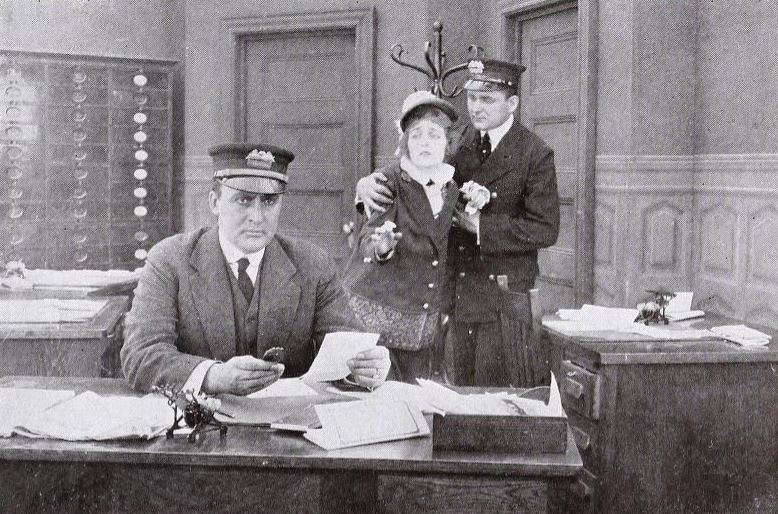
Applegate and Elsie MacLeod in Her Husband's Honor (1915)

- He Couldn't Help It (1927)
- Tin Gods (1926)
- Sally of the Sawdust (1925) as Detective
- Yolanda (1924) as Sir Karl Pitti
- Dead Men Tell No Tales (1920) as Capt. Harris
- Babs (1920) as Jabez Prouty
- The Midnight Bride (1920) as James Weir
- The Friendly Call (1920)
- The Prey (1920) as Pete Canard
- Upside Down (1919) as James Wortley Tammers
- The Cambric Mask (1919) as Henry Murden
- Once to Every Man (1918) as Dave
- The Daredevil (1918) as Col. Robert Carruthers
- A Man's Law (1918) as Mackenzie
- The Child of Destiny (1916) as Judge Gates
- Notorious Gallagher; or, His Great Triumph (1916) as Judge Winters
- The Kiss of Hate (1916) as Goliath
- A Daughter of the Sea (1915) as Alexander Gibson
- The Bludgeon (1915) as Fred Hillman
- The Game of Three (1915) as Bud, assistant detective
- All for a Girl (1915) as Arthur Jepson / Old farmer
- Her Husband's Honor (1915) as Deputy Grayson
- The Curious Conduct of Judge Legarde (1915) as Big Charles
- The Avalanche (1915) as Peter Vaughan
- Uncle Tom's Cabin (1914) as Simon Legree
- The Musician's Daughter (1911) as Opera House Manager
- Hands Across the Sea in '76 (1911)

== Bibliography ==
- Connelly, Robert B. (1998). The Silents: Silent Feature Films, 1910–36. Vol. 40 (2nd ed.). December Press. p. 439. ISBN 9780913204368.
