= The Cambric Mask =

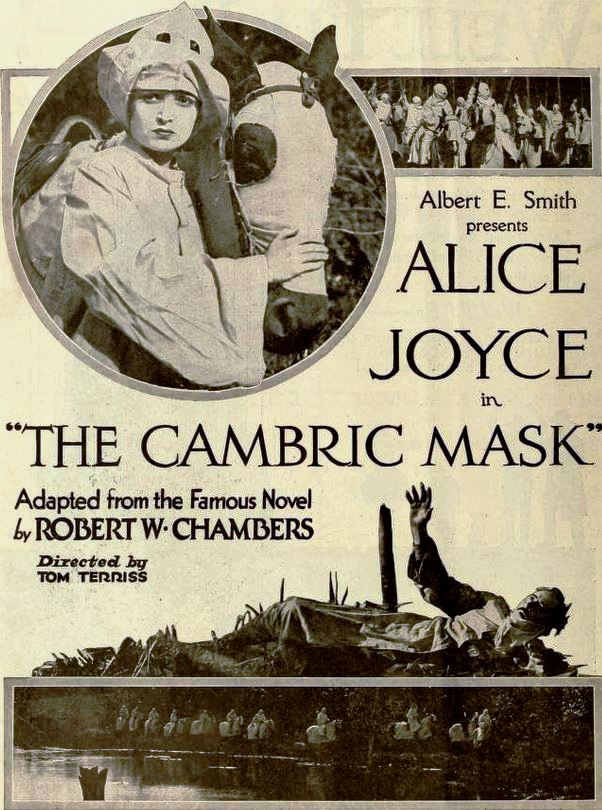
- Directed by: Tom Terriss
- Written by: Eugene Mullin; Tom Terriss; F. R. Buckley
- Based on: The Cambric Mask by Robert W. Chambers
- Produced by: Albert E. Smith
- Starring: Alice Joyce; Maurice Costello
- Cinematography: Joe Schellinger
- Production company: Vitagraph Company of America
- Distributed by: Vitagraph Company of America
- Release date: April 7, 1919
- Running time: 5 reels
- Country: United States
- Language: Silent (English intertitles)

The Cambric Mask is a 1919 American silent drama film directed by Tom Terriss and starring Alice Joyce and Maurice Costello. It was produced and distributed by the Vitagraph Company of America.

== Cast ==
- Alice Joyce as Rose Ember
- H.H. Pattee as Robert Ember (credited as Herbert Pattee)
- Maurice Costello as John Sark
- Roy Applegate as Henry Murden
- Bernard Siegel as David Creed
- Jules Cowles as Daniel Guernsey
- Martin Faust as Reggie Lanark
- Florence Deshon as Mrs. Lanark

== Preservation ==
With no prints of The Cambric Mask located in any film archives, it is a lost film.
