= 20,000 Leagues Under the Sea (1916 film) =

1916 movie from Stuart Paton

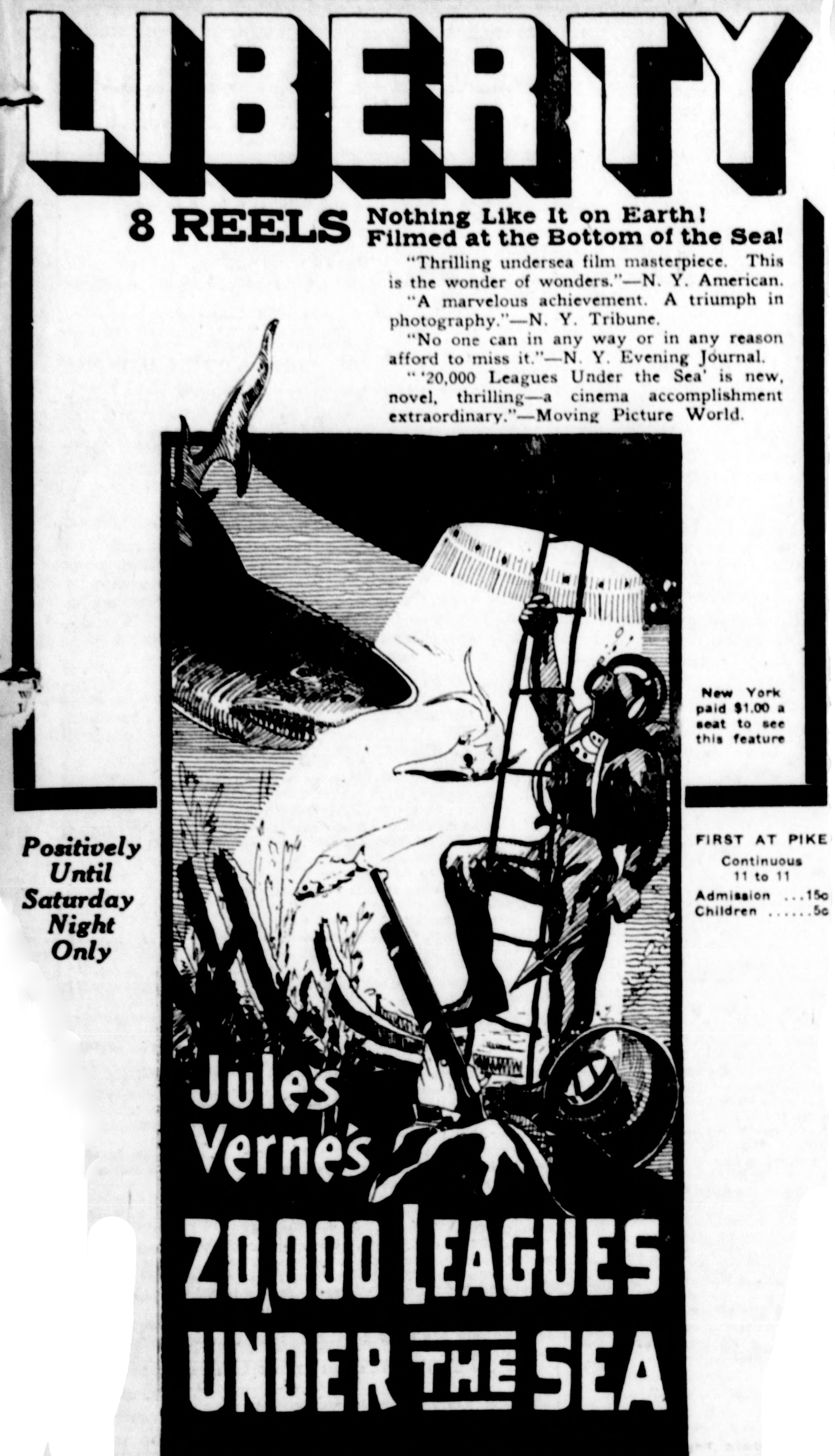
- Newspaper advertisement for the film.
- Directed by: Stuart Paton
- Screenplay by: Stuart Paton
- Based on: Twenty Thousand Leagues Under the Seas by Jules Verne
- Produced by: Carl Laemmle
- Starring: Allen Holubar; Jane Gail
- Cinematography: Eugene Gaudio
- Production company: Williamson Submarine Film Corporation
- Distributed by: Universal Film Manufacturing Company
- Release date: December 24, 1916
- Running time: 105 minutes
- Country: United States
- Languages: Silent film English intertitles
- Budget: $500,000 (equivalent to $11,747,706 in 2019)
- Box office: $8 million

20,000 Leagues Under the Sea is a 1916 American silent film directed by Stuart Paton. The film's storyline is based on the 1870 novel Twenty Thousand Leagues Under the Seas by Jules Verne. It also incorporates elements from Verne's 1875 novel The Mysterious Island.

On May 4, 2010, a new print of the film was shown accompanied by a live performance of an original score by Stephin Merritt at the Castro Theatre, as part of the San Francisco International Film Festival.

In 2016, the film was deemed "culturally, historically, or aesthetically significant" by the United States Library of Congress, and selected for preservation in the National Film Registry.

== Plot ==
20,000 Leagues Under the Sea (1916)

A strange "sea monster" has been rampaging the seas. The United States sends the naval vessel Abraham Lincoln to investigate. During their search, the vessel runs into the "monster,” and it damages their ship. The mysterious monster turns out to be Nautilus, the technologically advanced submarine of Captain Nemo. After the attack, the Abraham Lincoln is adrift with no rudder. Then, a "strange rescue" takes place. Captain Nemo guides his submarine directly beneath the four people who had been aboard the ship and fallen into the sea during the attack. Nautilus surfaces, and Nemo's crew brings the four rescued individuals aboard the submarine. The four include master harpooner Ned Land, a professor Pierre Aronnax, his daughter, and the professor's assistant. Once aboard the submarine, the four must swear they will not attempt to escape. The captain introduces them to his vessel and the wonders of its underwater realm. He later takes them hunting on the seafloor.

Meanwhile, union soldiers in a runaway Union Army balloon are marooned on a mysterious island. The soldiers find a wild girl living alone. Soon the yacht of Charles Denver arrives at the island. A woman's ghost (Princess Daaker) has haunted Denver, a former British colonial officer in India, whom he attacked years ago. Rather than submit to him sexually, she had stabbed and killed herself. Denver then fled with her young daughter only to abandon her on the island. Long tormented by his crime, he returned to find the girl or determine what happened to her.

One soldier schemes to kidnap the child aboard Denver's yacht. Another hears of the plan and starts swimming to the yacht to rescue her. Simultaneously, Nemo discovers the yacht belongs to Denver, the enemy he has been seeking all these years. The Nautilus destroys the yacht with a torpedo, but Captain Nemo saves the girl and her rescuer.

In elaborate flashback scenes to India, Nemo reveals he is Prince Daaker and created the Nautilus to seek revenge on Charles Denver. It overjoyed him to discover that the abandoned wild girl is his long-lost daughter, but his emotion overcomes him, and he dies. His loyal crew buries him at the ocean bottom. They disband and set the Nautilus adrift.

== Cast ==
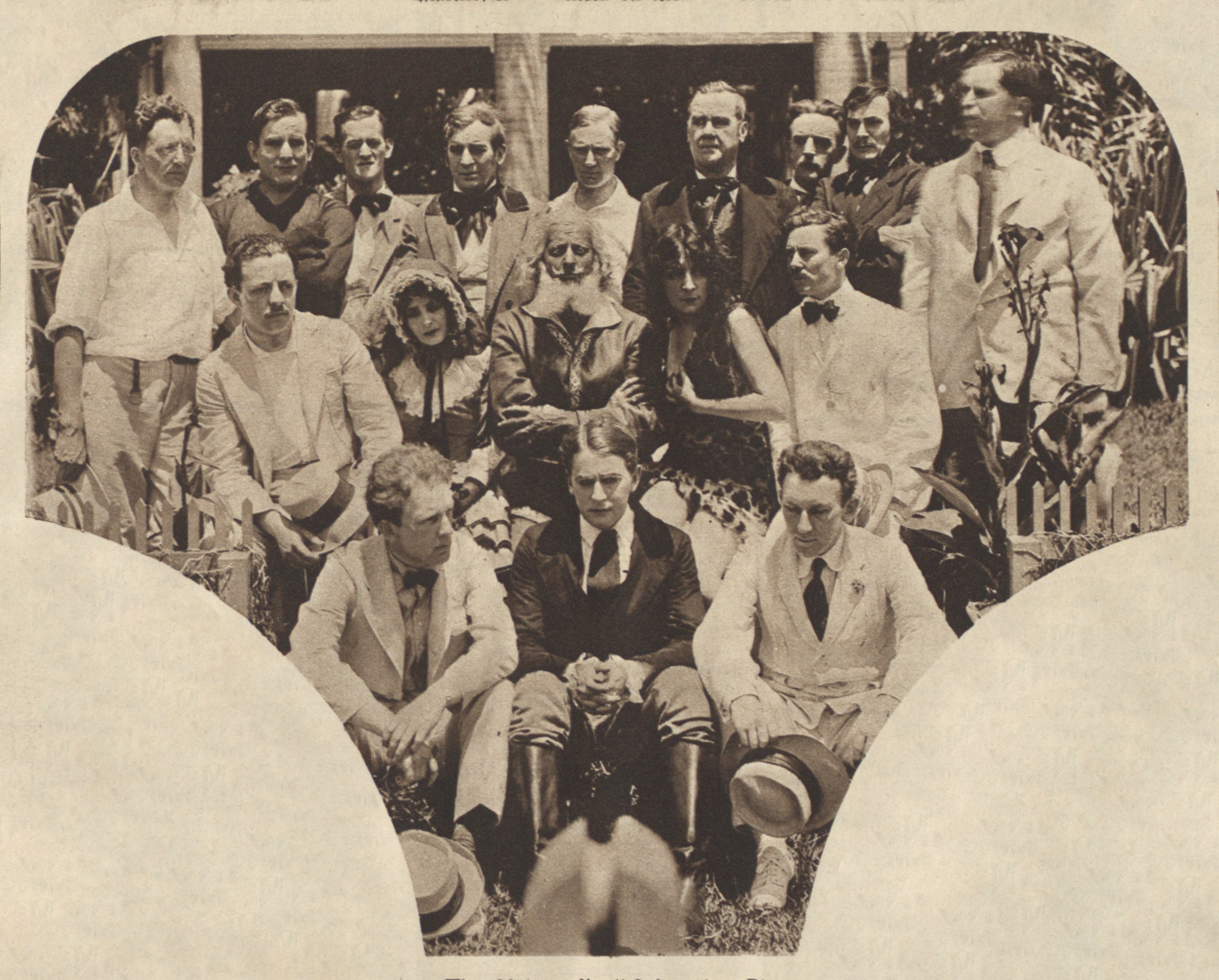
Cast and crew of the film

- Allen Holubar as Captain Nemo
- Jane Gail as A Child of Nature
- Matt Moore as Lieutenant Bond
- William Welsh as Charles Denver
- Curtis Benton as Ned Land
- Dan Hanlon as Professor Aronnax
- Edna Pendleton as Aronnax's Daughter

== Production ==
The camera system used to film the octopus scene

The "photosphere" underwater viewing chamber, designed by J.E. Williamson

This was the first feature-length motion picture filmed underwater. The underwater scenes were photographed by the Williamson Submarine Film Corporation in the Bahamas. Actual underwater cameras were not used, but a system of watertight tubes and mirrors allowed the camera to shoot reflected images of underwater scenes staged in shallow sunlit waters. For the scene featuring a battle with an octopus, cinematographer John Ernest Williamson devised a viewing chamber called the "photosphere", a 6×10-foot steel globe in which a cameraman could be placed. The chamber was connected to a boat by a submarine tube from where Williamson would give his directions.

The film was produced by the Universal Film Manufacturing Company (now Universal Pictures), not then known as a major motion picture studio. However, in 1916, they financed this film's innovative special effects, location photography, large sets, exotic costumes, sailing ships, and full-size navigable mock-up of the surfaced submarine Nautilus.

The film took two years to make, at the cost of $500,000. Hal Erickson has said that "the cost of this film was so astronomical that it could not possibly post a profit, putting the kibosh on any subsequent Verne adaptations for the next 12 years".

== See also ==
- List of underwater science fiction works
