= Colton, Staffordshire =

Village in Staffordshire, England

Coordinates: 52.780°N 1.925°W

Colton
- Location within the United Kingdom
- Population: 671 (2011)
- OS grid reference: SK052205
- Civil parish: Colton
- District: Lichfield
- Shire county: Staffordshire
- Country: England
- Sovereign state: United Kingdom
- Post town: RUGELEY
- Postcode district: WS15
- Dialling code: 01889
- UK Parliament: Lichfield

Colton is a village and civil parish in Lichfield District, Staffordshire, England. It is situated just outside the town of Rugeley off the B5013 road which heads towards Uttoxeter to the north.

Colton is the home to Border Collie Trust GB, a registered charity rescuing and rehoming Border Collies and Collie crosses throughout the UK.

The oldest building in the town is St Mary's Church, which dates back to the late 12th or early 13th century. The Colton Village Hall includes a playground park for young children and a small field popular with dog walkers. Beyond the field sits the Colton Wild Flower Meadow, which was established in 2018 to preserve meadow flowers, grasses, insect and bird life.

The village is entered by way of a hump-back bridge over the Moreton Brook, which has a ford alongside for large vehicles. It is said that in World War II, a US army lorry took the bridge at speed and overturned, seriously injuring two soldiers. St. Mary's Church stands on the right, with St. Mary's School on the left. There used to be a pool on the left a short distance beyond the school, on which people would skate, or slide, during the frequent very cold winters of the 1960s. A hundred yards further on is the Forge, where the Williscroft family worked creating steel hoop for cart wheels, toboggans for use in the snow on The Martlin Hill.

Colton House billeted a squad of Royal Engineers during the early years of World War II, and then American soldiers in 1944, with there being no telephone at Colton House, a soldier, with a bicycle, was permanently stationed a few hundred yards up the road outside the telephone box at the bottom of Martlin Lane, to respond as necessary when the telephone rang, in true Dad's Army fashion. The telephone service was part of the post office, and the soldier on duty at night would be comforted by a tray of cocoa and biscuits brought down the lane by the post-mistress's son.

At the foot of Martlin Lane is the 'Pinfold'. Entering the Pinfold from the South is a public footpath which crosses the fields to Rugeley and the B5013 road near Trent Valley Railway Station. Red bricks can be seen embedded in the ground at points on this walk, and they are believed to have been laid by prisoners taken during the Napoleonic War. Alongside the Pinfold is the village War Memorial. Almost opposite is The Greyhound Inn.

Further into the town there is Malt House Farm, which is the former home of the late prominent Euro-sceptic Tory MP Nick Budgen. Heading east, there is High House (the former village shop). Turning left leads to the main part of the village where the older 20th century houses have made way for more modern dwellings. From here, the northern end of the village sits Ye Olde Dun Cow, which doubles as a restaurant and a bed and breakfast inn. Further out of town is Manor Farm, while Heath Way leads to the hamlet of Stockwell Heath, whose duck pond has for several generations been referred to tongue-in-cheek as 'Stockwell Heath Docks'.

== Notable people ==
- Thomas Horsfall (1805–1878), Conservative politician, Lord Mayor of Liverpool 1847 to 1848; lived in Bellamour Hall later in life.
- F. R. Buckley (1896–1976), an English writer of over 200 short stories

== See also ==
- Listed buildings in Colton, Staffordshire
