= Steady Company (1932 film) =

1932 film by Edward Ludwig

- Directed by: Edward Ludwig
- Screenplay by: Edward Ludwig; Earle Snell
- Story by: Earle Snell
- Produced by: Carl Laemmle, Jr.
- Starring: Norman Foster; June Clyde; ZaSu Pitts; Henry Armetta; J. Farrell MacDonald; Maurice Black
- Cinematography: Charles J. Stumar
- Production company: Universal Pictures
- Distributed by: Universal Pictures
- Release date: March 14, 1932
- Running time: 65 minutes
- Country: United States
- Language: English

Steady Company is a 1932 American pre-Code action film directed by Edward Ludwig, written by Edward Ludwig and Earle Snell, and starring Norman Foster, June Clyde, ZaSu Pitts, Henry Armetta, J. Farrell MacDonald and Maurice Black. It was released on March 14, 1932, by Universal Pictures.

== Cast ==
- Norman Foster as Jim
- June Clyde as Peggy
- ZaSu Pitts as Dot
- Henry Armetta as Tony Capri
- J. Farrell MacDonald as Hogan
- Maurice Black as Blix
- Morgan Wallace as Tuxedo Carter
- Jack Perry as Pico Vacci
- Morrie Cohan as Curly Blake
- Willard Robertson as Pop Henley
