= The Love Doctor =

1929 film

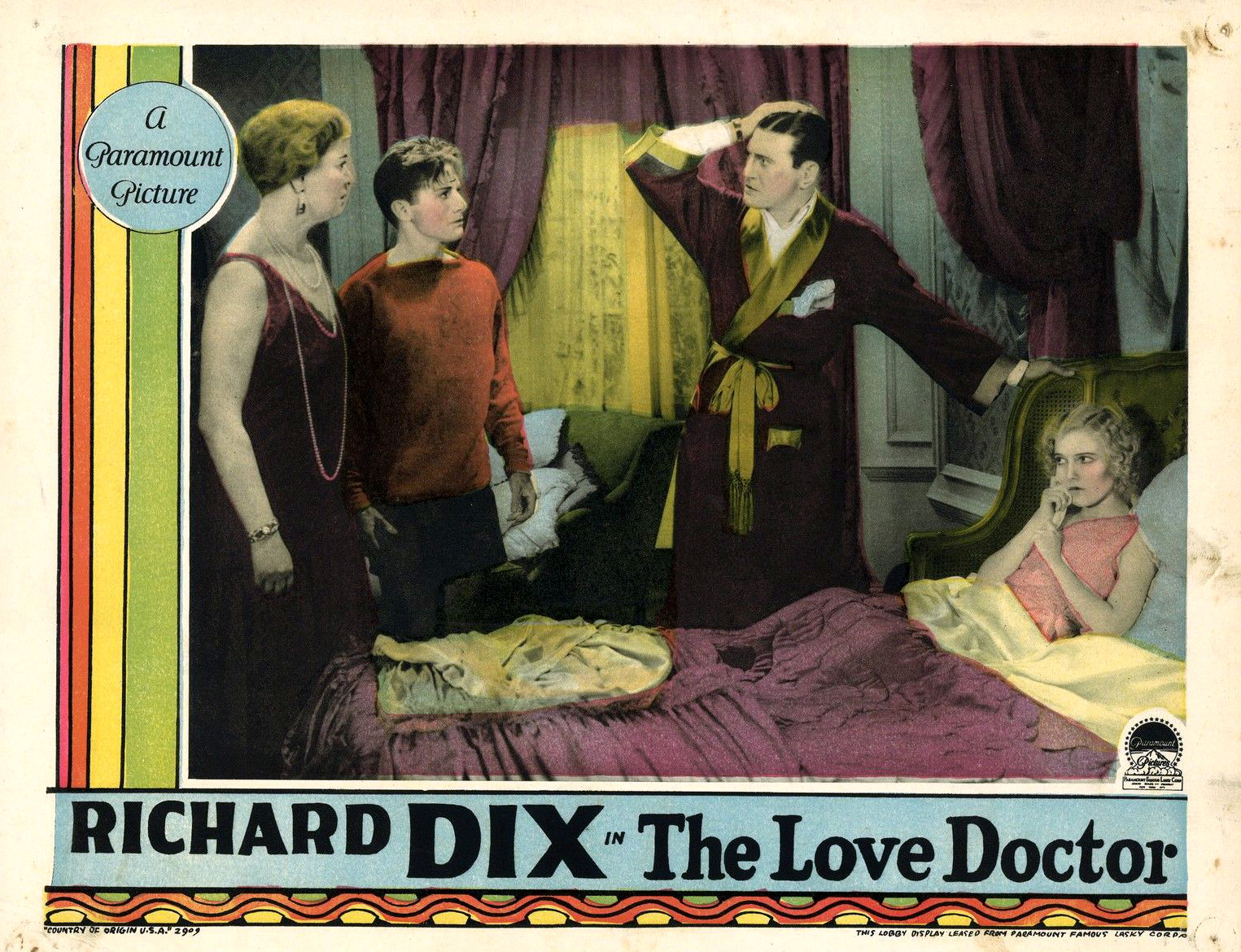
- Lobby card
- Directed by: Melville W. Brown
- Screenplay by: Guy Bolton; Herman J. Mankiewicz (titles); J. Walter Ruben
- Based on: The Boomerang by Winchell Smith and Victor Mapes
- Produced by: B. P. Schulberg; J. G. Bachmann
- Starring: Richard Dix; June Collyer; Morgan Farley; Miriam Seegar; Winifred Harris; Lawford Davidson
- Cinematography: Edward Cronjager
- Edited by: Otto Ludwig
- Music by: Karl Hajos
- Production company: Paramount Pictures
- Distributed by: Paramount Pictures
- Release date: October 5, 1929
- Running time: 61 minutes
- Country: United States
- Language: English

The Love Doctor is a 1929 American silent comedy film directed by Melville W. Brown and written by Guy Bolton, Herman J. Mankiewicz, and J. Walter Ruben based upon a play by Victor Mapes and Winchell Smith. The film stars Richard Dix, June Collyer, Morgan Farley, Miriam Seegar, Winifred Harris, and Lawford Davidson. The film was released on October 5, 1929, by Paramount Pictures.

It was previously filmed as a silent film in 1925, The Boomerang, starring Anita Stewart.

== Cast ==
- Richard Dix as Dr. Gerald Summer
- June Collyer as Virginia Moore
- Morgan Farley as Bud Woodbridge
- Miriam Seegar as Grace Tyler
- Winifred Harris as Mrs. Woodbridge
- Lawford Davidson as Preston DeWitt
- Gale Henry as Lucy

== See also ==
- List of early sound feature films (1926–1929)
