= Stung (1931 film) =

1931 film

- Directed by: William J. Cowen
- Written by: F. R. Buckley
- Produced by: Amadee J. Van Beuren, Van Beuren Studios
- Starring: Raymond Hatton; Warner Richmond; Maurice Black; Crauford Kent; Fred Howard; John Hyams
- Distributed by: RKO Pathé
- Release date: November 15, 1931
- Running time: 8 minutes
- Country: United States
- Language: English

Stung is a 1931 two reel sound short film, directed by William Cowen.

During a murder trial, a defense attorney "fixes" a witless juror to hold out for a manslaughter verdict. A critic for the Motion Picture Herald wrote: "A surprise in the last spoken words of this short feature is the entire 'punch'."

== Cast ==
- Raymond Hatton
- Warner Richmond
- Maurice Black
- Crauford Kent
- Fred Howard
- John Hyams
