= Tom Curry (writer) =

American pulp fiction writer

- Born: Thomas Albert Curry; November 4, 1900; Hartford, Connecticut, U.S.
- Died: October 7, 1976 (aged 75); Norwalk, Connecticut, U.S.
- Education: Columbia University
- Occupation: Writer
- Spouse: Louise Moore
- Children: 2
- Parents: Thomas Albert Curry Sr.; Sarah Jefferies
- Relatives: Helen Curry (sister); F. R. Buckley (brother-in-law)
- Writing career
- Language: English
- Years active: 1923–1974
- Genre: Pulp fiction

Thomas Albert Curry (1900–1976), was a 20th-century American pulp fiction writer who began writing crime and detective stories but went on to become one of the more prolific western writers in the genre.

== Early life ==
Curry was born in Hartford, Connecticut, on November 4, 1900. He attended Columbia College in 1920 and graduated in 1922. In 1923, he worked as a crime reporter for William Randolph Hearst's newspaper the New York American. Some of his early crime stories were taken from this experience.

Curry's sister was actress Helen Curry who was married to fellow pulp fiction author F. R. Buckley.

== Writing career ==
Curry was paid $25.00 for his first story to be published, "Diamond in the Rough", which appeared in the March 1921 edition of pulp magazine People's Favorite

In 1923 he was a crime reporter for the New York American.

Curry's stories have appeared in over 400 pulp magazines including Argosy, Black Mask, The Blue Book Magazine, Short Stories and several Thrilling Publications including Texas Rangers, Thrilling Adventures, Thrilling Ranch Stories and Thrilling Western

=== The Rio Kid ===
In 1939 Curry created his most well known character, The Rio Kid, bringing an element of historical fiction to the genre with his lead character interacting with actual historical events and people. This series had its own magazine devoted to it from 1939 through 1953

As was not uncommon in the genre, in addition to writing under his own name Curry would also write under pseudonyms including Jackson Cole, Bradford Scott (house names for Texas Ranger Magazine) and John Benton (house name for Thrilling Publications and sometimes ghostwrite for others such as Romer Zane Grey, eldest son of Zane Grey.

Curry was a prominent member of Western Writers of America for 50 years.

=== Selected works ===
| title | published |
|---|---|
| The Bandits Of Boise | 1965 |
| The Buffalo Hunters - A Rio Kid Western | |
| Blood on the Plains - A Captain Mesquite Novel | 1947 |
| Captain Mesquite | |
| Chaparral Marauders | 1939 |
| Colorado Gold | 1974 |
| The Comstock Load | |
| Drifter | 1973 |
| From an Amber Block | 1930 |
| Frontier Massacre | 1974 |
| Gunfighters Way | |
| Gunfighters Holiday | |
| Guns Of Dodge City | |
| Hate Along The Rio | 1938 |
| Hell's Dimension | 1931 |
| Indian Outpost | 1971 |
| Kit Carson's Way | |
| Land of Challenge | 1965 |
| Land Pirates, The | 1976 |
| Leadville Avengers - A Rio Kid Western | 1970 |
| Marshal Of Wichita | 1946 |
| The Montana Vigilantes - A Rio Kid Western | 1941 |
| The Mormon Trail - A Captain Mesquite Story | 1942 |
| Octopus Guns | 1950 |
| On To Cheyenne | 1976 |
| Outlaws Brand | 1969 |
| Pards of Buffalo Bill - A Rio Kid Western | 1941 |
| Raiders of the Valley | 1946 |
| Range Of Doom | 1966 |
| Riding For Custer - A Captain Mesquite Novel | 1947 |
| Round Up Guns | |
| Trail Blazers, The - A Rio Kid Western | |
| Trail Town Guns | 1948 |
| Wagons To California | 1972 |

== State register ==
Curry's former home in Norwalk, CT is listed on the Connecticut State Register of Historic Places.
