= The Hiding of Black Bill =

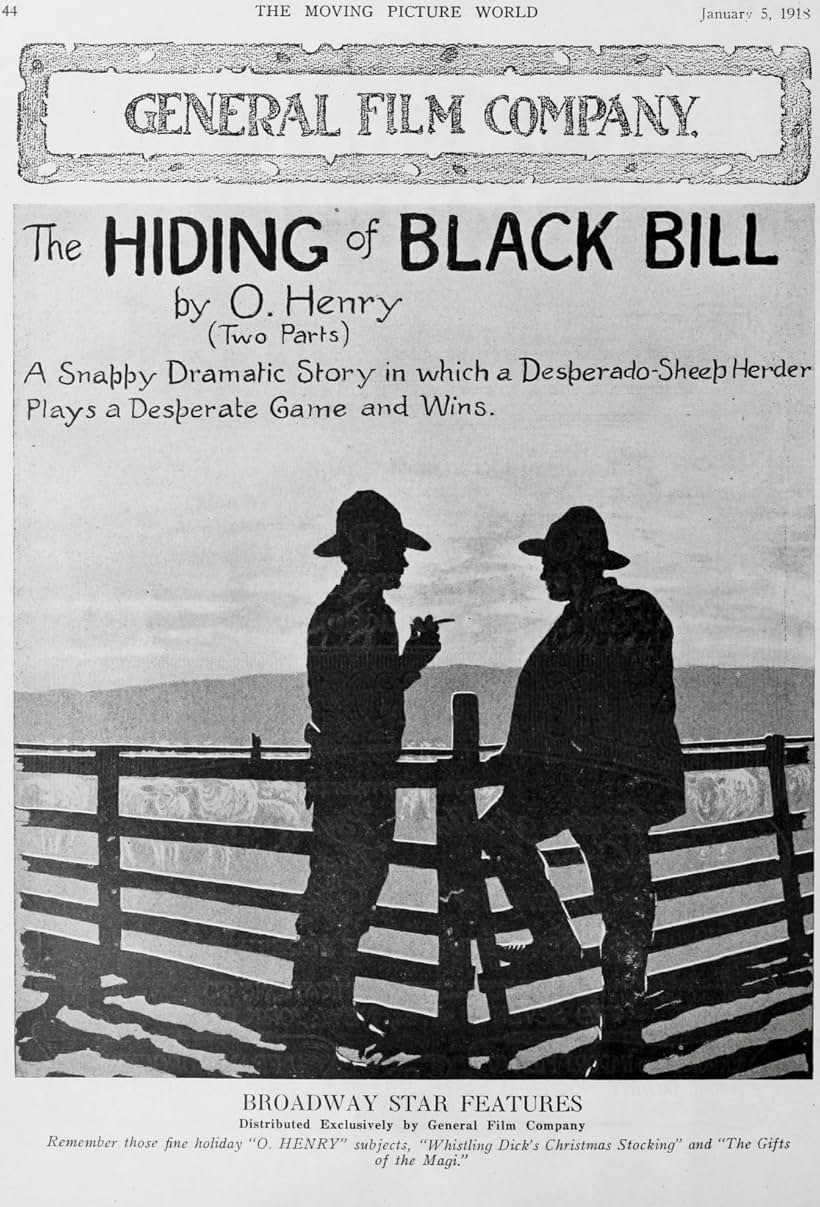
- Film advertisement
- Directed by: David Smith
- Written by: F. R. Buckley as F.H. Buckley (scenario)
- Based on: O. Henry
- Starring: Walter Rogers as W.L. Rogers
- Distributed by: General Film Company
- Release date: 1918 (United States)
- Running time: 2 reels
- Country: United States
- Language: Silent (English intertitles)

The Hiding of Black Bill is a 1918 American silent short film directed by David Smith, distributed by General Film Company. It is based on a story by O. Henry. It is currently classified as a lost film.

== Cast ==
- Walter Rogers as W.L. Rogers, A Hobo
- Chet Ryan as Henry Ogden
