= The Child of Destiny =

1916 film by William Nigh, David H. Thompson

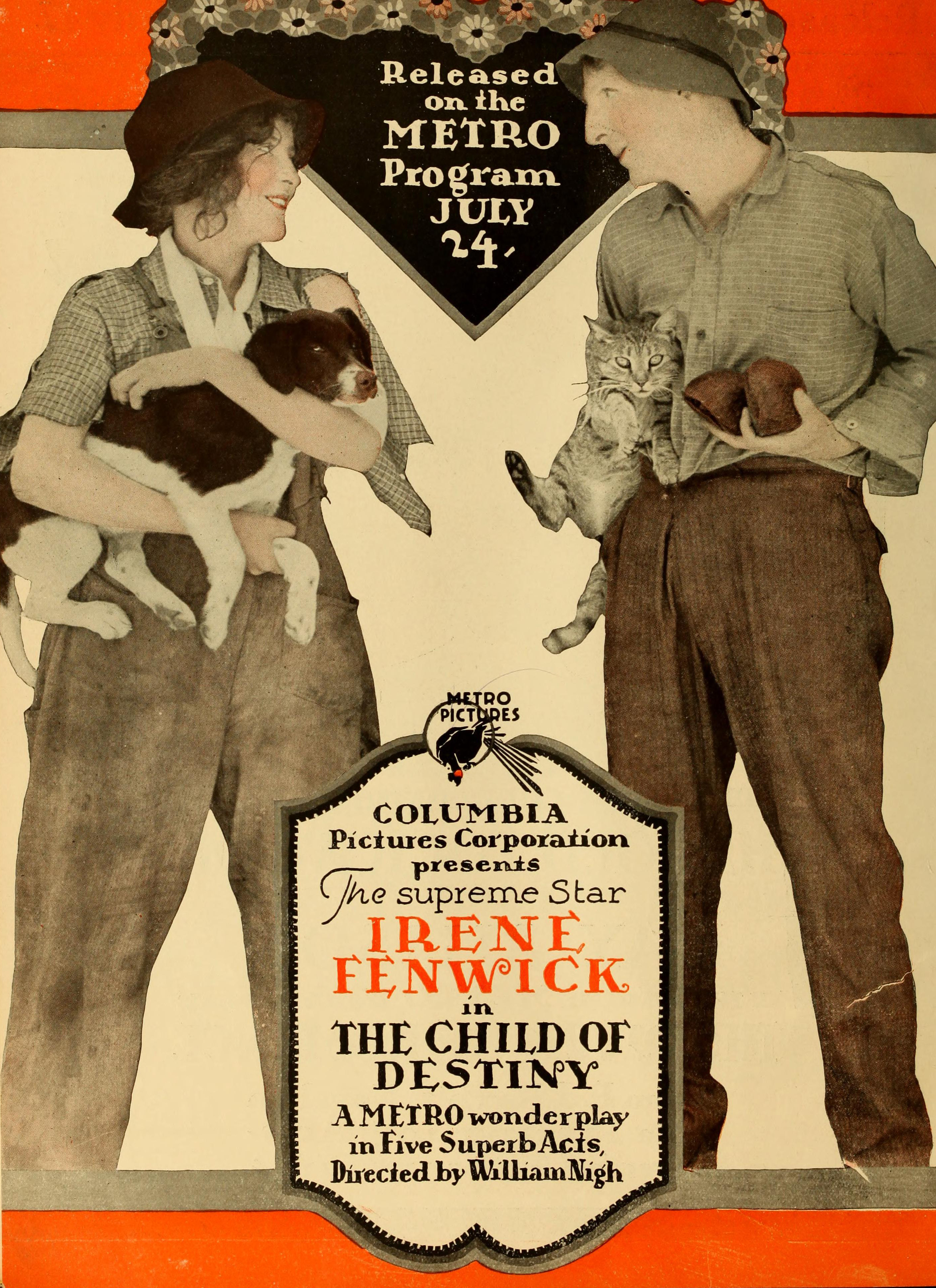
- Advertisement
- Directed by: William Nigh; David Thompson(assistant)
- Written by: William Nigh; Harry O. Hoyt
- Starring: Irene Fenwick
- Cinematography: Arthur A. Cadwell
- Production company: Columbia Pictures Corporation
- Distributed by: Metro Pictures
- Release date: July 24, 1916
- Running time: 50 minutes; 5 reels
- Country: USA
- Language: Silent ..English titles

The Child of Destiny is a lost 1916 American silent drama film directed by William Nigh and starring Irene Fenwick. It was produced and distributed by Metro Pictures.

== Cast ==
- Irene Fenwick - Alita
- Madame Ganna Walska - Constance (aka Ganna Walska)
- Robert Elliott - Bob Stange
- Roy Applegate - Judge Gates
- Roy Clair - Weird Willie
- William Yearance - Professor Jaeger
- Martin Faust - Oswald, His Son (*Martin J. Faust)
- William B. Davidson - Calvin Baker (*as William Davidson)
- R. A. Breese - Putnam
- Elizabeth Le Roy - Mrs. Putnam

== Production ==
The Child of Destiny was partially shot on location at a farm near Dyckman Street.
