= The Bearcat =

1922 film directed by Edward Sedgwick

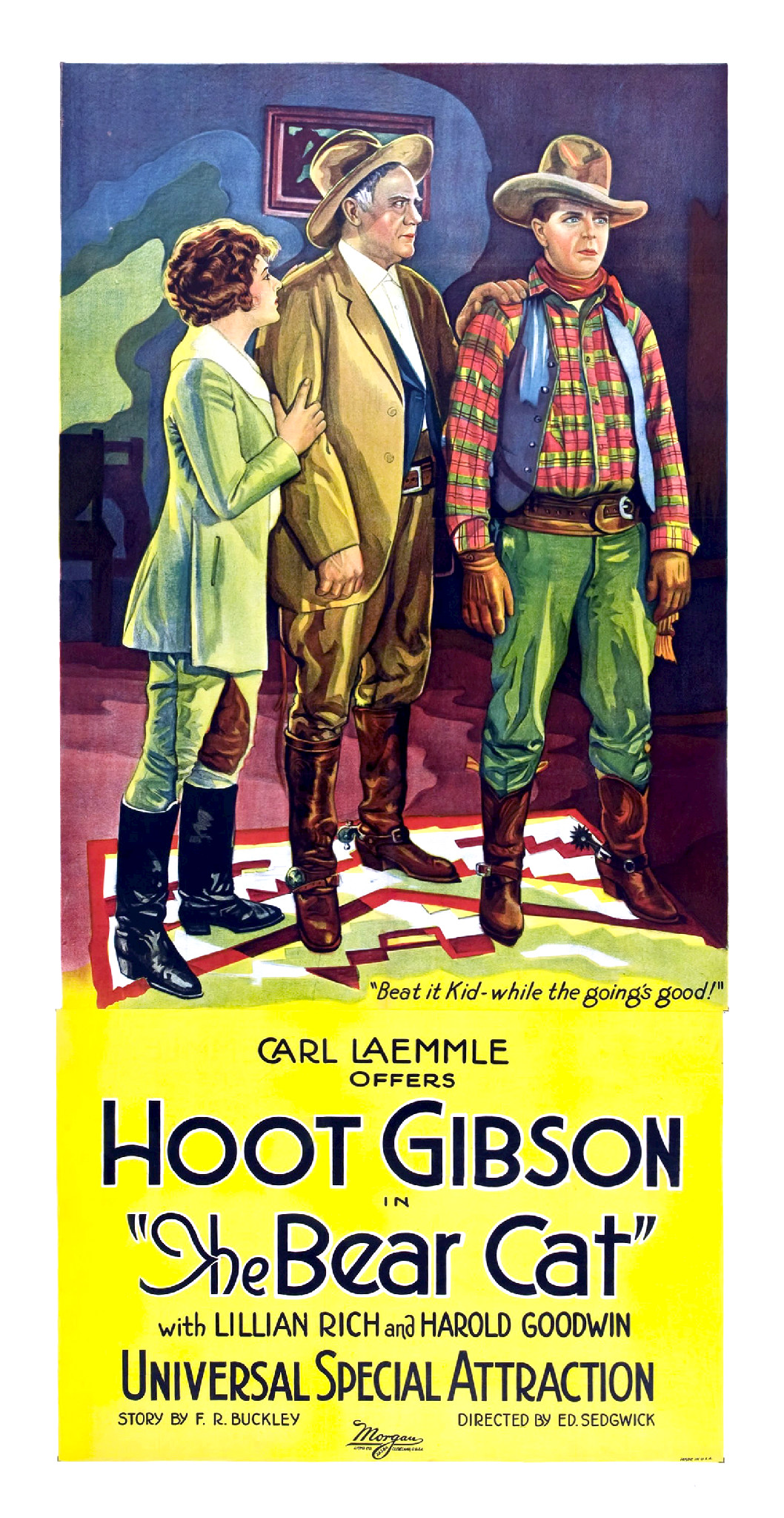
- Film poster
- Directed by: Edward Sedgwick
- Written by: F. R. Buckley; George Hively
- Starring: Hoot Gibson
- Cinematography: Charles E. Kaufman
- Distributed by: Universal Film Manufacturing Company
- Release date: April 3, 1922
- Running time: 50 minutes
- Country: United States
- Languages: Silent; English intertitles

The Bearcat is a 1922 American silent Western film, now considered lost. It was directed by Edward Sedgwick and featured Hoot Gibson in the lead role.

== Plot ==
As described in a film magazine, The Singin' Kid rides into town after a brief sojourn south of the border where he had been hiding because of an unjust charge. While employed as a "runner" on a ranch where he discovers a plot to mulct his employer. He frustrates the plan, exposes a trick that attempted to railroad him into jail, and discloses the worthlessness of Archer Aitken, lover of the ranch owner's daughter Alys May.

== Cast ==
- Hoot Gibson as The Singin' Kid
- Lillian Rich as Alys May
- Charles K. French as Sheriff Bill Garfield (credited as Charles French)
- Joe Harris as Doc Henderson
- Alfred Hollingsworth as John P. May
- Harold Goodwin as Peter May
- William Buckley as Archer Aitken
- Fontaine La Rue as Mary Lang
- James Alamo as Henry
- J.J. Allen as Jake Hensen
- Stanley Fitz as Cut Face
- Joe De La Cruz as One Eye
- Sam Polo as Pining Willis

== See also ==
- List of American films of 1922
- Hoot Gibson filmography
