= Helen Curry =

American stage actress

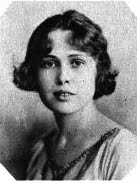
- Helen Curry (1920)
- Born: October 22, 1896; Chester, Pennsylvania, US
- Died: November 15, 1931 (aged 35); Norwalk, Connecticut, US
- Occupation: Actress
- Years active: 1913–1920
- Spouse: F. R. Buckley (m. 1916–1931) 1 daughter

Helen Curry (October 22, 1896 – November 15, 1931) was an American stage actress.

== Biography ==
=== Early life and family ===
Helen Curry was born October 22, 1896, in Chester, Pennsylvania to Thomas A. Curry and Sarah Jefferis, both of whom were playwrights. Curry had one brother, pulp fiction writer Tom Curry (1900-1976). In 1916, Curry married author F. R. Buckley and had a daughter in 1922.

=== The American Academy of Dramatic Arts ===
Curry studied at The American Academy of Dramatic Arts (AADA) which at the time was housed in the Lyceum Theatre. Her father, in addition to being a playwright, was the personal secretary to theatrical impresario David Belasco from 1914 until Belasco's death in 1931 and subsequently held the same position for Morris Gest. David Belasco was an important early supporter of the AADA. He taught acting there and also acted as stage manager (in today's terms, director or artistic director) for several productions at the Lyceum Theatre.

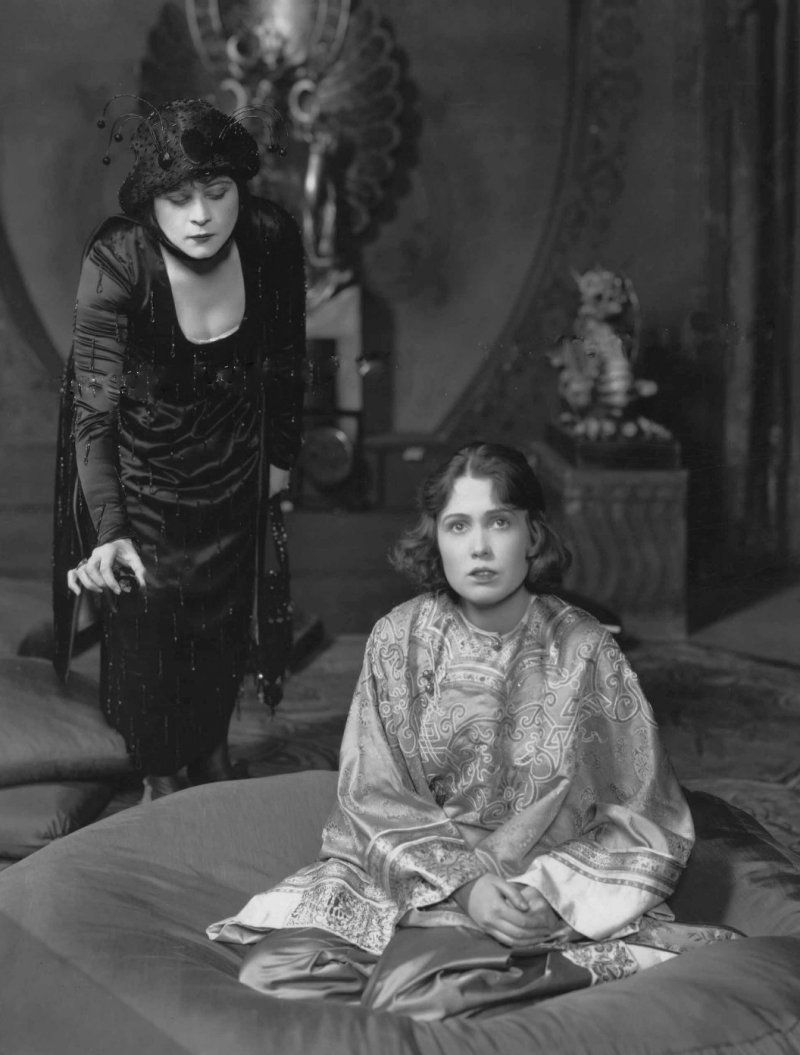
Theda Bara and Helen Curry in The Blue Flame

=== Career ===
She appeared in amateur theatricals with her parents as a child.

In 1913 at the age of 17 Curry had her first professional role touring with Doris Keane in Edward Sheldon's play Romance.

Curry played Miss Carpenter in Good Night, Nurse!, later renamed Sick-A-Bed, by Ethel Watts Mumford at the Tremont Theatre in Boston.

She also appeared in Cleves Kinkead's Common Clay with Jane Cowl.

She played the title character in Mary Broome at the Neighborhood Playhouse, part of the early 20th century Little Theatre Movement, similar to the off-Broadway movement of the 1950s. O. W. Firkins of The Weekly Review said of her "Miss Helen Curry as Mary Broome was perfect".

In 1920 Curry appeared on Broadway with silent film star Theda Bara in The Blue Flame, a four-act play written by George V. Hobart and John Willard.

=== Death ===
Curry died November 15, 1931, at the age of 35 at her home in Norwalk, Connecticut an apparent suicide. She was interred in Cedar Hill Cemetery, Hartford, Connecticut.

== State register ==
Curry's former home in Norwalk, CT is listed on the Connecticut State Register of Historic Places.
