= F. R. Buckley =

English writer

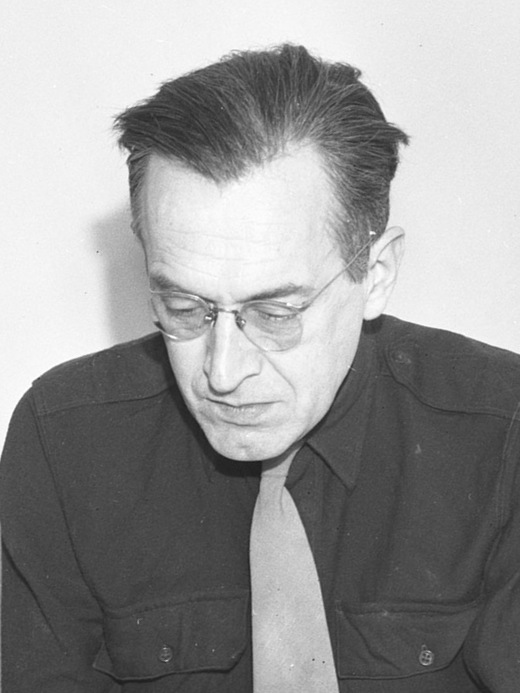
- F. R. Buckley in 1945
- Born: 20 December 1896; Colton, Staffordshire, England
- Died: 11 April 1976 (aged 79); Kings Lynn, Norfolk, England
- Occupations: Writer; screenwriter; radio presenter; film critic; actor
- Years active: 1917–1972
- Spouses: Helen Curry (m. 1916; died 1931); Ruth Tennant (m. 1950, divorced); Marie Victoria Lindsey (m. 1959)
- Children: 2
- Parents: R. J. Buckley; Mary Wakelin

F. R. Buckley (1896–1976) was an English writer. He wrote more than 200 short stories for pulp magazines between 1918 and 1953.

== Early and personal life ==
He was born Frederick Robert Buckley on 20 December 1896 in Colton, Staffordshire, England and died in 1976. He was the son of R. J. Buckley (1847–1938) and Mary Wakelin. His father was music critic for the Birmingham Gazette from 1886 to 1926. Frederick attended King Edward's School, Birmingham and Birmingham University, studying journalism. While at King Edward's School, at age 14, he performed in Aristophanes' Peace in the role of Theoria. Also in the cast was schoolmate J. R. R. Tolkien playing Hermes.

In 1915, Buckley went to the United States on the SS St Louis and worked as Chief reviewer and later Editor for the Motion Picture Mail, a Saturday magazine supplement of the New York Evening Mail. Buckley then moved to become New York Managing Editor of the Exhibitors Herald.

In 1916, Buckley married American actress Helen Curry, sister of fellow pulp fiction author Tom Curry. He returned to England in 1932 after his first wife's suicide. His second marriage to Ruth Tennant ended in divorce. He remarried once again in 1959, to Marie Victoria Lindsay.

== Silent film era ==
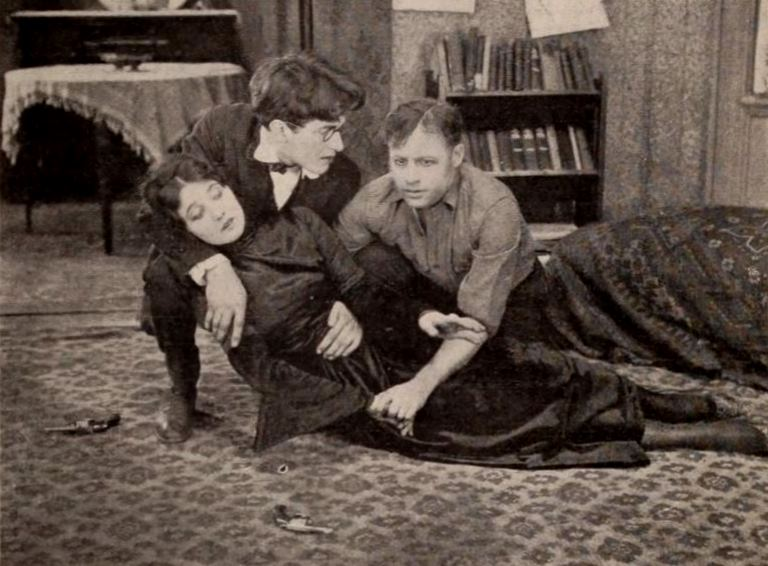
Betty Blythe, Frederick Buckley and Guy Empey in a still from the 1919 silent film The Undercurrent

Starting in 1917, he worked in silent film in Brooklyn for the Vitagraph Studios where he was primarily a screenwriter and occasionally an actor. Between 1917 and 1918 he wrote, co-wrote or adapted the scenarios for The Cambric Mask, By the World Forgot, A Gentleman's Agreement, The Purple Dress, Lost on Dress Parade, The Song of the Soul, The Other Man, The Hiding of Black Bill, A Night in New Arabia, The Last of the Troubadours and The Lovers' Knot. He appeared in principal roles in The Undercurrent and The Unknown Quantity.

== Writer ==
External images
- The Red Book Magazine cover, March 1922
- Adventure magazine cover, v105 #5, September 1941
- Adventure magazine cover, v106 #4, February 1942

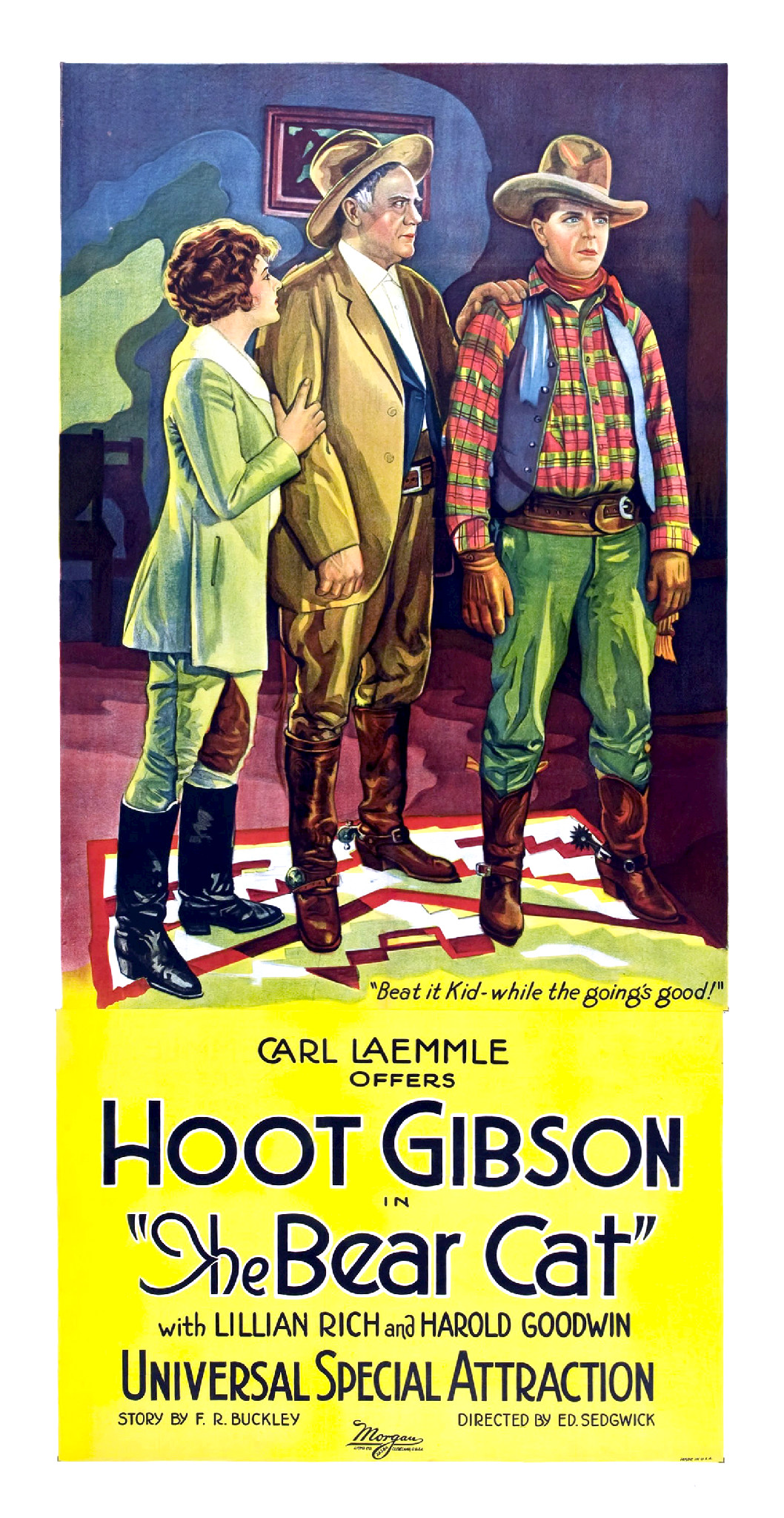
Poster of the movie The Bearcat, a Western now lost from 1922, crediting the writer F.R. Buckley

Buckley left Vitagraph after selling Getting It, his first short story to The Black Cat, an American magazine specializing in original short stories of an unusual nature for $20.00.

=== O. Henry Award ===
In 1922, Buckley won the O. Henry Award for his short story Gold-Mounted Guns published in Red Book Magazine, March 1922. His story Habit, honorably mentioned in the O'Henry Memorial Volume for 1923. and published in the 30 April 1923 issue of Adventure was adapted for the 18 July 1948 episode of the CBS radio program Escape.

=== Slicks, Pulps and Novels ===
Buckley's fiction also appeared in Collier's, Liberty, McClure's, Ellery Queen's Mystery Magazine, and The Saturday Evening Post. He was also extensively published in many pulp magazines including Adventure, Hutchinson's Adventure-story Magazine, Argosy, The Blue Book Magazine, Short Stories , The Story-Teller and Western Story Magazine. For Adventure, Buckley wrote a series of stories set in the Italian Renaissance, revolving around the swashbuckling exploits of condottieri Captain Luigi Caradosso. The Luigi Caradosso stories were enormously popular with Adventure's readers. When Adventure published a new Caradosso story in the May 1940 issue (after a six-year hiatus), the editor Howard Bloomfield noted that many readers had written in to request that the magazine "Bring back Captain Caradosso." Buckley also wrote a novel, The Way of Sinners, set in sixteenth-century Italy, in which Caradosso is mentioned. Buckley also published Western, mystery and sea stories as well as historical fiction.

Later, some of Buckley's short stories would be adapted for film or radio by others. The Bearcat, a 1922 Universal Film Manufacturing Company picture, Peg Leg and the Kidnapper, originally published in Western Story Magazine was used for the 1926 Fox Film Corporation film The Gentle Cyclone and RKO Radio Pictures Stung 1931.

=== Return to journalism ===
In the 1930s, Buckley returned to England and wrote film criticism again, now for the Birmingham Evening Despatch.

== Broadcaster ==
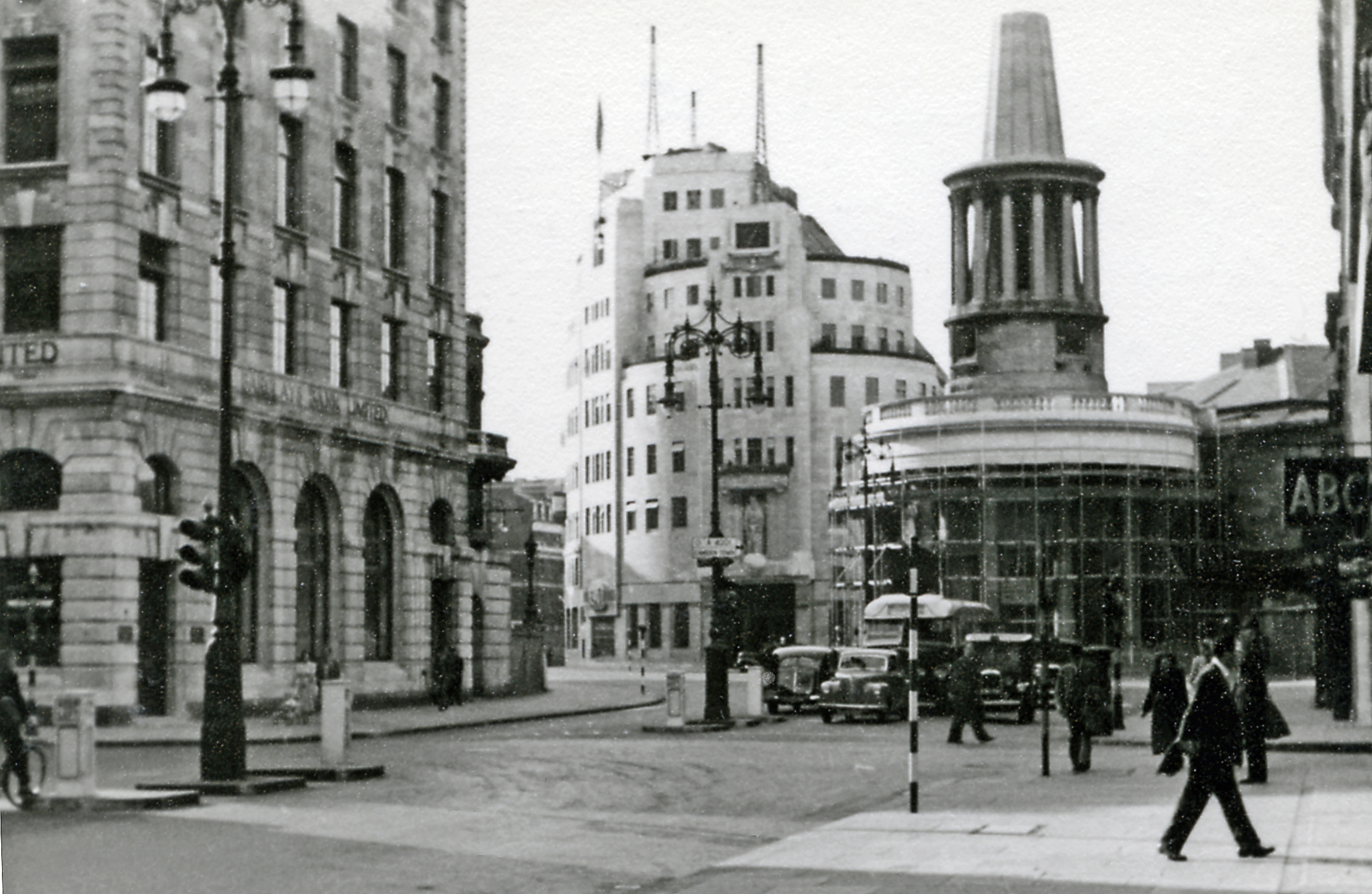
BBC Broadcasting House in London in 1949

Back in England, Buckley was a writer and on-air radio presenter on the BBC from 1934 to 1970.

Sometime between 1947 and 1951, Buckley is credited with bringing actor and comedian Stanley Unwin to the attention of BBC producers Peter Cairns and David Martin, who premiered Unwin's first broadcast on the radio programme Pat Dixon's Mirror of the Month In the mid 1950s, Buckley worked as a portrait painter in Paris.

From 1959 to 1962, Buckley was heard as a regular panellist on the weekly BBC radio programme The Guilty Party, wherein a crime play was dramatised, after which the panellists would cross-examine the characters in an effort to figure out who was guilty of the crime.

== Historic Homes ==
=== Connecticut State Register ===
Buckley's former home (1920-1932) in Norwalk, Connecticut is listed in both the Norwalk Historic Resource Inventory and with the Connecticut State Historic Preservation Office on the Connecticut State Register of Historic Places.

=== National Heritage List for England ===
From the 1960s to the time of his death in 1976, Buckley lived in a reportedly haunted (though not very enthusiastically, according to Buckley) listed building on the National Heritage List for England in King's Lynn, Norfolk, England, which is known as The Exorcist's house.
