= Westward Ho! (1919 film) =

- Directed by: Percy Nash
- Written by: Charles Kingsley (novel); W. Courtney Rowden
- Produced by: Harry B. Parkinson
- Starring: Renee Kelly; Charles Quatermaine; Irene Rooke
- Production company: Master Films
- Distributed by: British Exhibitors' Films
- Release date: November 1919
- Country: United Kingdom
- Languages: Silent; English intertitles

Westward Ho! is a 1919 British silent historical adventure film directed by Percy Nash and starring Renee Kelly, Charles Quatermaine and Irene Rooke. It is an adaptation of the 1855 novel Westward Ho! by Charles Kingsley, set during the Spanish Armada (1588).

== Cast ==
- Renee Kelly as Rose Salterne
- Charles Quatermaine as Don Guzman
- Eric Harrison as Amyas Leigh
- Booth Conway as Salvation Yeo
- Irene Rooke as Mistress Leigh
- Ernest Wallace as John Oxenham
- Dolly Robbins as Aya Canova
- Allen Hilton as Frank Leigh
- J.H. Barnes as Master Salterne

== Bibliography ==
- Goble, Alan. The Complete Index to Literary Sources in Film. Walter de Gruyter, 1999.
