= All for a Girl (1915 film) =

1915 short film by Roy Applegate

- Directed by: Roy Applegate
- Written by: Rupert Hughes (play)
- Story by: Lillian Case Russell
- Produced by: H.J. Streyckmans
- Cinematography: George Coudert
- Production company: Mirograph Corp.
- Distributed by: Mirograph Corp.
- Release date: July 1915
- Country: United States

All for a Girl is a 1915 American comedy drama short silent black and white film directed by Roy Applegate and starring Renee Kelly. It is based on the 1908 play by Rupert Hughes.

== Cast ==
- Renee Kelly as Antoinette Hoadley
- Edward G. Longman as Harold Jepson
- Frank DeVernon as Mr. Dinwiddie
- Sue Balfour as Mrs. Van Espen
- E.T. Roseman as Briggs
- Roy Applegate as Arthur Jepson / Old farmer
- Margaret Willard as Miss Dinwiddie
- Georgia Harvey as Miss Broderick
- Al Grady as Basil Mugg
- Jerold Hevener as Count Barony
- Sidney D'Albrook as Prince De Cauchy
- Bert Tuey as Clerk
- Robert Lawrence
