= Held for Damages =

- Directed by: Jack Harvey
- Written by: Harry Dittmar
- Starring: Harry Benham; Edna Pendleton
- Production company: Independent Moving Pictures
- Distributed by: Universal Film Manufacturing Company
- Release date: April 11, 1916
- Running time: 2 reels
- Country: USA
- Language: Silent

Held for Damages is a 1916 American short silent comedy film, directed by Jack Harvey. It stars Bertram Busby, Harry Benham, and Edna Pendleton.

== Plot ==
Bob Norton is in love with Peggy O’Brien, who runs a successful dress shop under the name "Madame Frou Frou". Peggy refuses to marry him unless he can show that he has money of his own. Bob asks his wealthy father for help, but his father refuses and instead boasts about a bulldog he has just bought for five hundred dollars. He tells Bob that if he can prove he is worth as much as the dog, he will give him the same amount. Bob is ordered to take the dog home and care for it.

Bob brings the bulldog to Peggy’s shop. The dog chases a cat that lives there and causes major damage to the shop. Peggy locks the dog in a closet. Soon after, Bob is also locked in the closet during the chaos. Peggy calls Bob’s father and demands that he come to the shop and pay for the release of his dog.

Bob’s father arrives and pays for the dog. He is surprised to learn that Peggy also expects payment for Bob, who has been stuck in the closet the whole time. The father says he only cares about the dog. Peggy replies that she does not want Bob either and hands him over.

As Bob is taken away, Peggy realizes she cannot lose him. She offers Bob’s father the money she received for the shop damage in exchange for her son. This gesture softens the old man. He sees that Bob is worth five hundred dollars to Peggy, even if no one else values him. Touched by her good sense and affection, he tears up her check and writes a new one. This time it is enough to secure Bob and Peggy’s future together.

== Cast ==
- Edna Pendleton as Peggy O'Brien
- Harry Benham as Bob Norton
- Bertram Busby as Elisha Norton
