= The Curious Conduct of Judge Legarde =

1915 film directed by Will S. Davis

- Directed by: Will S. Davis
- Written by: Jesse J. Goldburg (scenario)
- Based on: Play by Victor Mapes and Louis Forest
- Production company: Life Photo Film Corp.
- Release date: April 1915

The Curious Conduct of Judge Legarde (released in 1920 as The Valley of Night) is a 1915 American drama silent black and white film directed by Will S. Davis. It is based on the play of the same name by Victor Mapes and Louis Forest. The film is lost.

This film, The Case of Becky (1915) and The Brand of Satan (1917) established a basic framework of representation which is still often utilized (the split personality).

== Cast ==
- Lionel Barrymore as Judge Randolph Legarde
- Edna Pendleton as Amelia Garside
- William H. Tooker as Inspector Barton
- Roy Applegate as Big Charles
- T.W.M. Draper
- August Balfour
- Charles E. Graham
- Arthur Morrison
- Ed Roseman
- Thomas O'Keefe
- Betty Young

== Bibliography ==
- Soister, John T.; Nicolella, Henry; Joyce, Steve (January 10, 2014). American Silent Horror, Science Fiction and Fantasy Feature Films, 1913–1929. McFarland Publishing. p. 830. ISBN 9780786487905.
