= Maurice Black =

American actor (1891–1938)

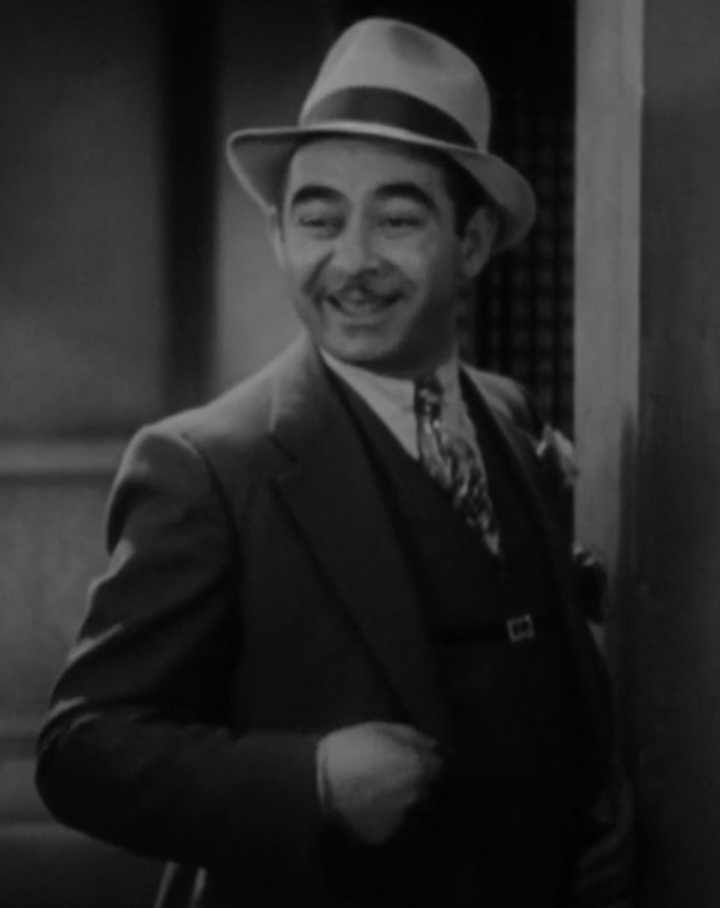
- Black in The Front Page (1931)
- Born: January 14, 1891; Queens, New York City, U.S.
- Died: January 18, 1938 (aged 47); Hollywood, California, U.S.
- Occupation: Actor
- Years active: 1928–1938
- Spouse: Edythe Raynore

Maurice Black (January 14, 1891 – January 18, 1938) was an American character actor. He appeared in more than 100 films from 1928 to 1938.

Black assimilated the many dialects of his native New York, and became a proficient, all-purpose character actor. He often played immigrants and urban gangsters of international origin. He is best known to today's audiences for his appearances in the Edward G. Robinson features Little Caesar and Smart Money (both 1931), the Ben Hecht-Charles MacArthur comedy The Front Page (1931), the Boris Karloff thriller The Bride of Frankenstein (1935), and the Laurel and Hardy comedy Bonnie Scotland (1935).

He was married to Edythe Raynore. His screen career was cut short when he died of pneumonia in 1938, four days after his 47th birthday.

== Selected filmography ==
- Captain Swagger (1928) – Manager, Viennese Club (uncredited)
- Show Folks (1928) – Vaudeville Performer
- Marked Money (1928) – Donovan
- Romance of the Underworld (1928) – Maitre D' (uncredited)
- The Carnation Kid (1929) – Tony
- Square Shoulders (1929) – Hook
- Broadway Babies (1929) – Nick Stepanos
- Dark Streets (1929) – Beefy Barker
- Song of Love (1929) – Tony Giuseppe (uncredited)
- Playing Around (1930) – Joe
- Street of Chance (1930) – Nick
- Framed (1930) – Bing Murdock
- Show Girl in Hollywood (1930) – Actor in Scene (uncredited)
- The Runaway Bride (1930) – 'Red' Dugan (uncredited)
- True to the Navy (1930) – Sharpie (uncredited)
- Numbered Men (1930) – Lou Rinaldo
- Common Clay (1930) – Speakeasy Proprietor (uncredited)
- Abraham Lincoln (1930) – Conspirator (uncredited)
- The Sea God (1930) – Rudy
- Brothers (1930) – Giuseppe Michaelo Lorenzo
- Renegades (1930) – Cafe Manager (uncredited)
- Big Money (1930) – Lewis Wilder
- Little Caesar (1931) – Little Arnie Lorch
- No Limit (1931) – Happy
- Lonely Wives (1931) – Taxi Driver
- Sit Tight (1931) – Mr. White (uncredited)
- The Front Page (1931) – Diamond Louie
- The Spy (1931) – Commissar
- Smart Money (1931) – Greek Barber
- Women Go on Forever (1931) – Pete
- Sob Sister (1931) – Gimp Peters (uncredited)
- Stung (1931, Short) – The Accused
- Stowaway (1932) – Minor Role
- Dancers in the Dark (1932) – Max
- Steady Company (1932) – Blix
- Scarface (1932) – Jim – Headwaiter (uncredited)
- Symphony of Six Million (1932) – Felix's Patient (uncredited)
- While Paris Sleeps (1932) – Roca
- The Famous Ferguson Case (1932) – Kaplan (scenes deleted)
- The Strange Love of Molly Louvain (1932) – Nicky's Pal (uncredited)
- The King Murder (1932) – Philip Scott
- Tiger Shark (1932) – Jean Fernandez – a Shipwrecked Crewman (uncredited)
- The All American (1932) – Blackie Doyle
- The Face on the Barroom Floor (1932) – Cesar Vanzetti
- Rasputin and the Empress (1932) – Revolutionary Soldier (uncredited)
- Grand Slam (1933) – Paul (uncredited)
- Blondie Johnson (1933) – Tony (uncredited)
- The Keyhole (1933) – Cuban Jewelry Salesman (uncredited)
- The Cohens and Kellys in Trouble (1933) – Nick (uncredited)
- Elmer, the Great (1933) – Dice Dealer (uncredited)
- Picture Snatcher (1933) – Speakeasy Proprietor (uncredited)
- I Cover the Waterfront (1933) – Ortegus
- A Shriek in the Night (1933) – Josephus Martini (uncredited)
- Her First Mate (1933) – Boat Extra on Steps (uncredited)
- Ship of Wanted Men (1933) – George Spinoli
- Night Flight (1933) – Nightclub Manager (uncredited)
- Tillie and Gus (1933) – Bit Part (uncredited)
- Murder on the Campus (1933) – Blackie Atwater
- Twin Husbands (1933) – Feets
- Flying Down to Rio (1933) – One of the Three Greeks #2
- Sixteen Fathoms Deep (1934) – Nick – Henhman / Crewman
- Half a Sinner (1934) – Mike
- Friends of Mr. Sweeney (1934) – Pierre, the Headwaiter (uncredited)
- The Party's Over (1934) – Proprietor of Sweet Shop (uncredited)
- Down to Their Last Yacht (1934) – Joe Spilatti (uncredited)
- Gift of Gab (1934) – Audition Room Owner (uncredited)
- Wake Up and Dream (1934) – Tom Romero
- The Mighty Barnum (1934) – Imposter (uncredited)
- West of the Pecos (1934) – Shorty Evans
- Bride of Frankenstein (1935) – Gypsy (uncredited)
- Under the Pampas Moon (1935) – Patron (uncredited)
- The Daring Young Man (1935) – Florist (uncredited)
- Orchids to You (1935) – Flower Seller (uncredited)
- The Crusades (1935) – Amir (uncredited)
- Bonnie Scotland (1935) – Khan Mir Jutra
- The Last Days of Pompeii (1935) – Attendant in Gladiators' Training Room (uncredited)
- Stars Over Broadway (1935) – Jim Flugel (uncredited)
- Exclusive Story (1936) – Martinello (uncredited)
- Laughing Irish Eyes (1936) – Tony Martin
- Silly Billies (1936) – Bandit with Toothache (uncredited)
- A Son Comes Home (1936) – Greek Sailor (uncredited)
- Missing Girls (1936) – Miller
- Ellis Island (1936) – Nails
- Under Strange Flags (1937) – General Pancho Villa
- Three Legionnaires (1937) – Gen. Stavinski's aide
- The Californian (1937) – Pancho
- The Life of Emile Zola (1937) – Minor Role (uncredited)
- The Firefly (1937) – Pigeon Vendor (uncredited)
- The Game That Kills (1937) – Jeff
- Adventure's End (1937) – Blackie
- Walking Down Broadway (1938) – Norton (uncredited) (final film role)
