= Dan Hanlon =

American silent film actor (1866–1951)

- Born: 1866; San Francisco, California, United States
- Died: 1951 (aged 84–85)
- Occupation: Actor
- Years active: 1916

Daniel E. Hanlon (1866–1951) was an American silent film actor born in San Francisco, California, of Irish heritage. He was best known for his debut film role as Professor Aronnax in 20,000 Leagues Under the Sea (1916). He began his career performing in theatre, debuting on stage in 1894 in Brooklyn, New York. He subsequently toured for the Lizzie Gonzalez Opera company, performed with Lewis Morrison in a West Coast tour of The Privateer, acted opposite Henry Ludlowe, stage managed for Jacob Adler, and appeared with Ralph Stuart in By Right of Sword. He also spent three seasons in the part of Sanballet in the theatre blockbuster Ben-Hur.

Hanlon is noted by The New York Dramatic Mirror for "contributing to the success of the Crescent Stock company in Brooklyn" in 1909." In 1917, while directing for the Players Stock company of St. Louis, he was announced as the producer of a five-reel drama for the St. Louis Times.

He died in 1951.

== Filmography ==
Year	Title	Role	Ref
1916	The Great Problem	Bill Carson	
1916	The River of Romance	Butler	
1916	20,000 Leagues Under the Sea	Prof. Aronnax	
