= Renee Kelly =

British actress (1888–1965)

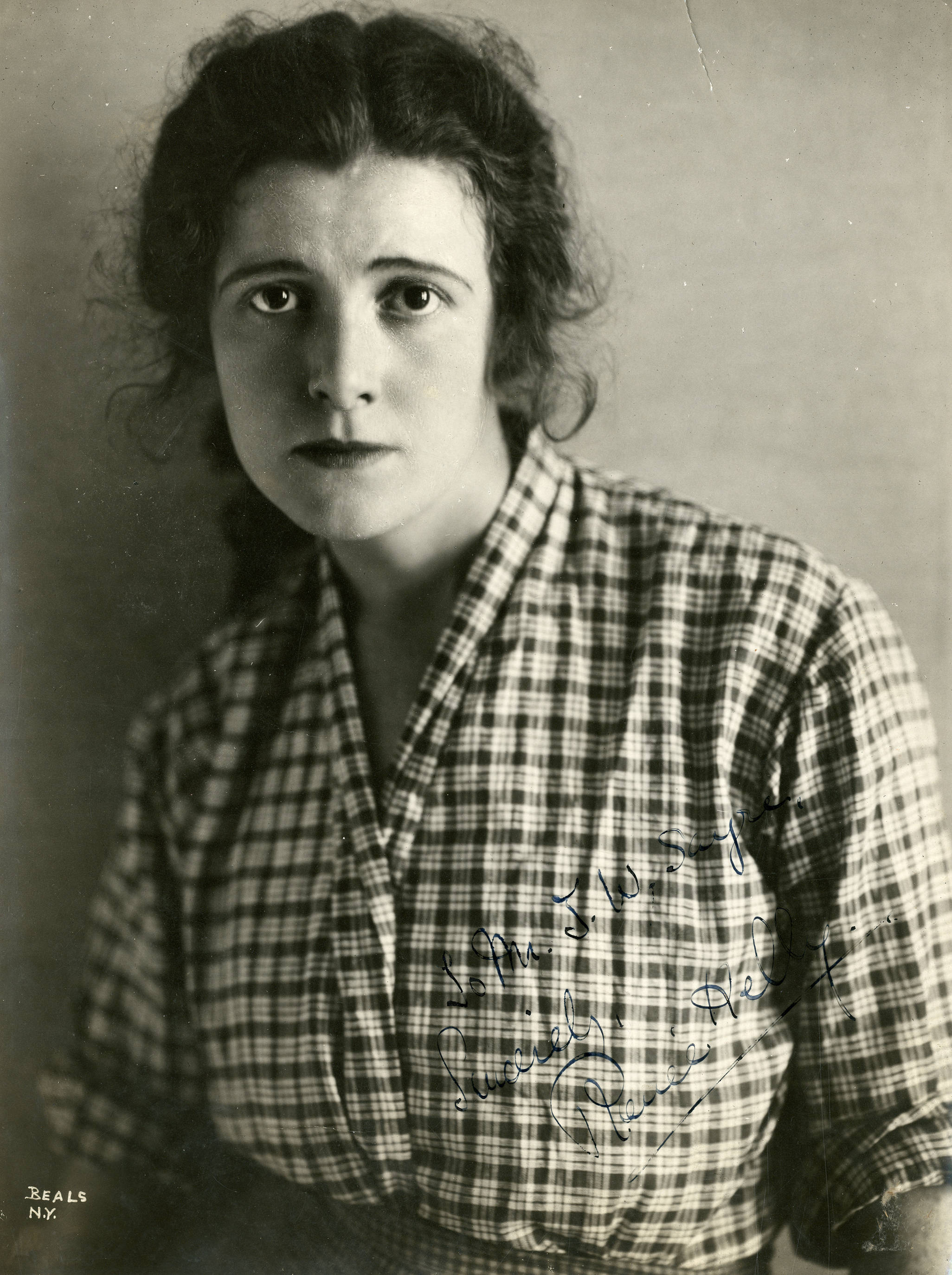
- Renee Kelly in 1915
- Born: 4 June 1888; London, England
- Died: 28 August 1965
- Occupation(s): Stage and film actress

Renee Kelly (4 June 1888 – 28 August 1965) was an English stage and film actress.

Kelly was born in London but her family moved to New York during her childhood. She won awards for elocution at Erasmus Hall High School in Brooklyn.

When Kelly was 24, she stepped into a role at Wyndham's Theatre after an actress became sick, and Kelly "received rave notices". Her credits on Broadway include The Garden of Paradise (1914), Don't Weaken (1914), June Madness (1912), Peggy (1911), The Learned Ladies (1911), The Lady from the Sea (1911), and Modern Marriage (1911). In the 1910s, Kelly portrayed Judy Abbott in a touring production of Daddy Longlegs. The production set house records at theaters in Cincinnati, Cleveland, Detroit, Pittsburgh, Seattle and St. Louis.

Kelly later lived in Mid Sussex and opened a China and Glass shop in South Road, Haywards Heath. She called it "Judy Abbott" after the role she played in the production of Daddy Longlegs. Kelly was married to actor Hilton Allen. On 28 August 1965, she died in Haywards Heath Hospital near London, aged 77.

== Selected filmography ==
- The Bigger Man (1915)
- All for a Girl (1915) as Antoinette Hoadley
- Everybody's Business (1917)
- Westward Ho! (1919)
- Foul Play (1920)
- All Sorts and Conditions of Men (1921)
- The Likeness of the Night (1921)
- Scarlet Thread (1951)
