= Lionel Adams =

American actor (1866–1952)

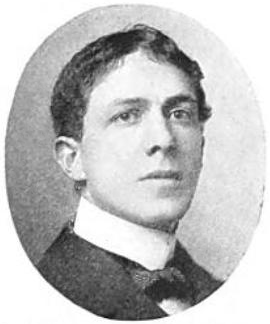
- Born: 1866; New Orleans, Louisiana, US
- Died: August 10, 1952 (aged 85–86); New York, New York, US
- Occupation: Actor

Lionel Adams (1866 – August 10, 1952) was an American silent film and theater actor.

== Biography ==
Lionel Adams was born in New Orleans in 1866.

He died in New York City on August 10, 1952.

== Filmography ==
- The Great Problem (1916)
- Thais (1917)
- The Impostor (1918)
- Fantômas (1920)
- Yes or No (1920)
- Janice Meredith (1924)
