= Victor Mapes =

American playwright and director

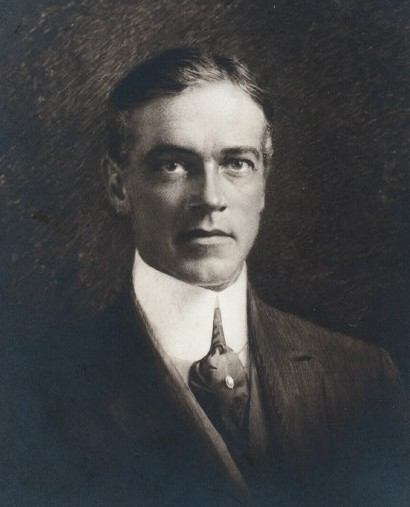
- Mapes c. 1910
- Born: 10 March 1870; New York City, New York, US
- Died: 27 September 1943 (aged 73); Cannes, Alpes-Maritimes, France
- Occupation(s): Playwright, producer and director

Victor Mapes (10 March 1870 – 27 September 1943) was an American playwright, stage manager and director.

== Life ==
Victor Mapes was born in New York City on 10 March 1870. He belonged to an old New York Family. He attended Columbia University, where he proved an excellent athlete and graduated in 1891 at the head of his class. He became a journalist, and the next year spent time in Paris, France, where he studied drama at the Sorbonne. He lived in Paris from 1892 to 1896. In May 1895 his play La Comtesse de Lisne was staged at the Theatre Mondaine. He was Paris correspondent for The New York Sun.

After returning to the USA Mapes became stage manager at the Lyceum Theatre in New York for Daniel Frohman in 1897. Later that year he resigned to become drama critic for the New York World. He wrote under the pseudonym of "Sidney Sharp". When his first American play, A Flower of Yeddo, was produced Mapes resigned from the World. A Flower of Yeddo was staged at the Empire Theater of New York in 1898. His play The Tory's Guest was produced at the same theater in 1900.

While writing plays, Mapes became general stage director of Daly's Theater in New York, and in 1904 became manager at the Globe Theater in Boston. In 1906 he became director of the New Theater in Chicago, which opened in October that year. The theater was founded by a group of leading Chicago citizens with the aim of producing worthwhile plays for limited runs without elaborate scenery or costumes, and without promoting stars. The high-minded formula was not successful. Mapes resigned at the end of 1906.

Mapes's best known works are The Boomerang (1915), and two plays written in collaboration, The New Henrietta (1913) and The Hottentot (1920). The Boomerang, produced by David Belasco and starring Arthur Byron and Martha Hedman, ran at the Belasco Theatre for 522 performances. It has been called a "sunny, youthful, spirited play", with excellent performances by the leader actors. Boomerang was written in collaboration with Winchell Smith, The farce Hottentot was written in collaboration with William Collier Sr.

Victor Mapes died in Cannes, France on 27 September 1943 during World War II.

== Work ==
=== Broadway ===
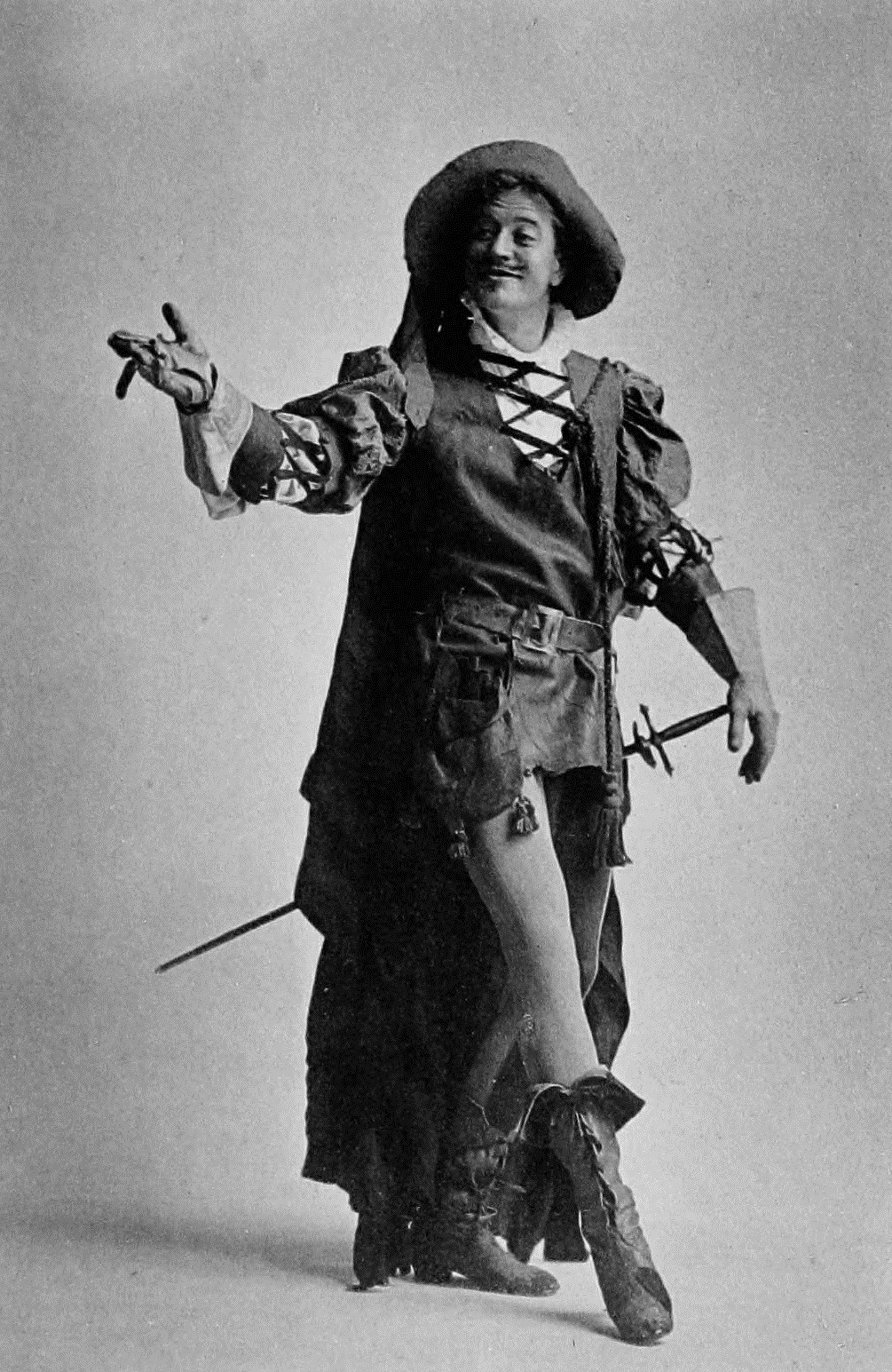
James K. Hackett in Don Caesar's Return (1901)

Mapes' Broadway shows include the following:

- Don Caesar's Return (Play) Author and Director, 3 September 1901 – November 1901
- Captain Barrington (Drama) Author, 23 November 1903 – January 1904
- Gallops (Comedy) Stage Manager, 12 February 1906 – April 1906
- The New Henrietta (Comedy) Revisor, 22 December 1913 – February 1914
- The Boomerang (Comedy) Author, 10 August 1915 – November 1916
- The Lassoo (Play) Author, 13 August 1917 – October 1917
- The Long Dash (Play) Author, 5 November 1918 – December 1925
- The Hottentot (Comedy, Farce) Author, 1 March 1920 – June 1920

=== Novels ===
- Mapes, Victor (1909). Partners Three: a Novel. New York: Frederick A. Stokes. pp. 258.
- Mapes, Victor (1910). The Gilded Way: A Novel. New York, Washington: Neale Publishing Company. pp. 326.
- Mapes, Victor (1921). Heart and Soul. (published under the pseudonym "Maveric Post"). New York: The Century Co. p. 132.

=== Film ===
Mapes was credited as writer for a number of films:

- 1915 The Curious Conduct of Judge Legarde (based on the play The Curious Conduct of Judge Legarde)
- 1915 The Lamb (based on the play The New Henrietta - uncredited)
- 1920 The Saphead (based on the play The New Henrietta)
- 1922 The Hottentot (based on the play)
- 1925 The Boomerang (based on the play The Boomerang: A Comedy in Three Acts)
- 1929 The Hottentot (based on the play)
- 1929 The Love Doctor (based on the play The Boomerang)
- 1937 High Flyers (based on the play)
- 1938 Going Places (based on the play The Hottentot)
