= Henry Hallett =

British actor (1888–1952)

Henry Hallett (1 February 1888 in Whitehaven, Cumbria, England, UK – 24 July 1952) was a British stage and film actor.

== Filmography ==
- The Hound of the Baskervilles (1932)
- Jew Süss (1934)
- Tudor Rose (1936)
- Spy of Napoleon (1936)
- Victoria the Great (1937)
- Sixty Glorious Years (1938)
- Let's Be Famous (1939)
- The Thief of Bagdad (1940)
- Penn of Pennsylvania (1941)
- Salute John Citizen (1942)
