= The Magnificent Ambersons (disambiguation) =

The Magnificent Ambersons is a 1918 novel written by Booth Tarkington.

The Magnificent Ambersons may also refer to:

- The Magnificent Ambersons (film), a 1942 American period drama directed by Orson Welles
- The Magnificent Ambersons (2002 film), a poorly received 2002 television film, directed by Alfonso Arau
