= Pampered Youth =

1925 film

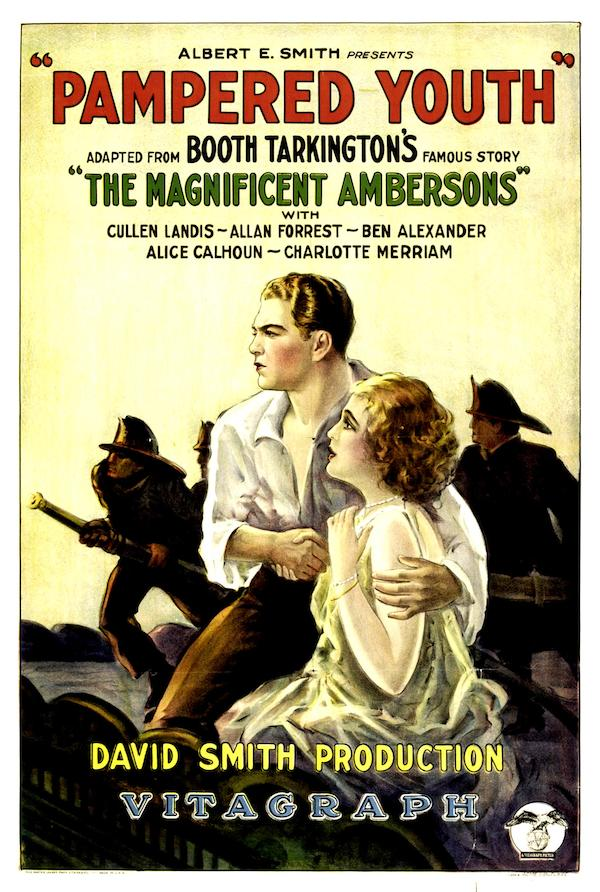
- Directed by: David Smith
- Written by: Jay Pilcher
- Based on: The Magnificent Ambersons by Booth Tarkington
- Produced by: Albert E. Smith
- Starring: Cullen Landis; Alice Calhoun; Allan Forrest
- Cinematography: W. Steve Smith Jr.
- Production company: Vitagraph Company of America
- Distributed by: Vitagraph Company of America
- Release date: February 1, 1925
- Running time: 6640 feet (73 minutes at 24 fps)
- Country: United States
- Language: Silent (English intertitles)

Pampered Youth is a 1925 American silent drama film directed by David Smith and starring Cullen Landis, Alice Calhoun, and Allan Forrest. It is an adaption of the 1918 novel The Magnificent Ambersons by Booth Tarkington. It was one of the final films produced by Vitagraph Studios before the firm was absorbed into Warner Bros.

== Plot ==
Two To One, abridged surviving version of Pampered Youth.

As described in a review in a film magazine, twenty-five or thirty years ago, every small town boasted of its Amberson family, whose home was the show place and whose every move made news. Major Amberson's daughter Isabel loves Eugene Morgan, but he gets himself in disgrace by performing a drunken serenade, and leaves town. Isabel marries Wilbur Minafer, a poor second choice, who makes a very passable husband. Not loving her husband, Isabel centers all of the love in her heart upon her son George, who naturally grows from a very spoiled young boy into a despicable young cad. His extravagances eventually deplete the Amberson fortune. When his father dies, George resents his mother's love for Morgan, who has returned as a prosperous automobile manufacturer. George has come to love, however, Morgan's daughter Lucy. The death of Major Amberson forces George to go to work, bringing about his regeneration. Then there is the heroic rescue of Isabel by Morgan when the home in which she lodges burns. The final tableau suggests the rehabilitation of George.

== Cast ==
- Cullen Landis as George Minafer
- Ben Alexander as George Minafer, as a child
- Allan Forrest as Eugene Morgan
- Alice Calhoun as Isabel Minafer
- Emmett King as Major Amberson
- Wallace MacDonald as Wilbur Minafer
- Charlotte Merriam as Lucy Morgan
- Kathryn Adams as Fanny Minafer
- Aggie Herring as Mrs. Foster
- William Irving as George Amberson

== Preservation ==
The complete 7-reel feature is a lost film. However, a 16 mm abridged version, released in 1931 for the United Kingdom as Two to One, survives and it was first included on the 1986 Criterion Laserdisc edition of The Magnificent Ambersons and subsequent Blu-ray release in 2018.

== Bibliography ==
- Goble, Alan (1999). The Complete Index to Literary Sources in Film. Walter de Gruyter.
