= It Can Be Done =

It Can Be Done may refer to:

- It Can Be Done (1921 film), an American silent comedy film
- It Can Be Done (1929 film), an American comedy film

== See also ==
- It Can Be Done Amigo, a 1972 Spanish / Italian / French film
