= The Shooting of Dan McGrew (1915 film) =

1915 film

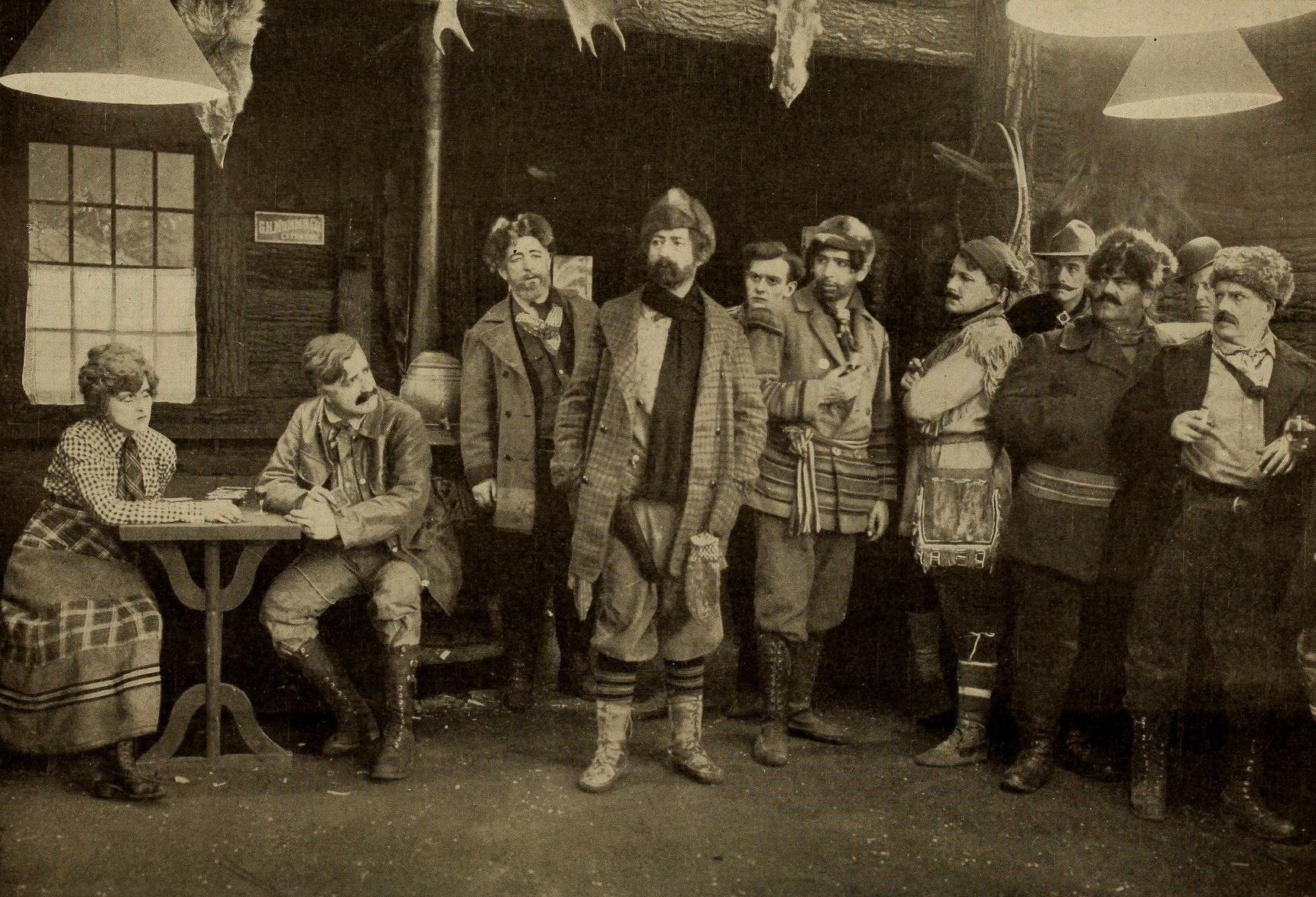
- Scene from film
- Directed by: Herbert Blaché
- Written by: Aaron Hoffman; Marvin Dana
- Story by: Aaron Hoffman (scenario)
- Based on: "The Shooting of Dan McGrew" by Robert W. Service
- Produced by: Herbert Blaché; Alice Guy
- Starring: Edmund Breese; William A. Morse; Kathryn Adams; Betty Riggs
- Cinematography: Alfred Ortlieb
- Production companies: Popular Plays and Player Company
- Distributed by: Metro Pictures
- Release date: May 2, 1915
- Running time: Five reels
- Country: United States
- Language: Silent

The Shooting of Dan McGrew is a 1915 silent American drama film directed by Herbert Blaché, based on the 1907 poem of the same name. It was produced by Solax Studios when it and many other early film studios in America's first motion picture industry were based in Fort Lee, New Jersey, at the beginning of the 20th century.

The setting of the original poem was a Yukon saloon during the Klondike Gold Rush of the late 1890s. As of 2019, the National Film Preservation Board considers The Shooting of Dan McGrew lost.

== Plot ==
The opening scene is of the interior of the Malamute saloon. Dangerous Dan McGrew and the lady that's known as Lou are seen seated at a table in one corner. A dog-sleigh stops outside, and its owner, a tired-looking, bedraggled miner, stumbles through the door. After treating the house, he sits down at the piano and begins to play. Into the soulful, stirring music he pours his pent up feelings of hatred, sorrow, love and regret. Years before, Jim Maxwell's best friend, Dan McGrew, had deceived his wife into believing him unfaithful. Their elopement completely unnerved him for a time. But finally he resolved to forget about it, until he next met Dan McGrew. Years afterwards, while prospecting, he met his daughter, now grown to womanhood and married. Her husband had been arrested for a murder committed by McGrew, and Maxwell assisted in effecting his escape. Just previous to the miner's entrance, Nell's husband had been captured in the saloon by the sheriff. As Maxwell finishes playing, he turns about, faces Dangerous Dan McGrew, and tells him, in uncomplimentary language, what he thinks of a man of his type. The lights go out, two guns blaze in the dark, and both men fall. Maxwell recovers and is reunited to Lou, his wife. McGrew dies.

— Motography (May 22, 1915)

== Cast ==
- Edmund Breese as Jim Maxwell
- William A. Morse as Dan McGrew
- Kathryn Adams as Lou Maxwell
- Ordean Stark as Nell Maxwell (child) (as Audrine Stark)
- Evelyn Brent as Nell (adult) (as Betty Riggs)
- Wallace Stopp as Nell's Husband

== See also ==
- The Shooting of Dan McGrew (1924 film), another silent film based on the same poem
- List of films based on poems
