= Red and White Roses =

- Directed by: William J. Humphrey; Ralph Ince
- Written by: W. A. Tremayne
- Produced by: Vitagraph Company of America
- Starring: William Humphrey; Julia Swayne Gordon; Earle Williams
- Distributed by: Vitagraph Company of America
- Release date: March 10, 1913
- Running time: short
- Country: USA
- Language: Silent.. English

Red and White Roses is a 1913 silent short film directed by William Humphrey and Ralph Ince. It starred Humphrey, Julia Swayne Gordon and Leah Baird. It was produced by the Vitagraph Company of America and distributed by the General Film Company.

It survives in the Library of Congress.

== Plot ==
The character Lida de Jeanne, who portrays a vamp in the film, attempts to seduce the character of Morgan Andrews who is running for governor.

== Cast ==
- William Humphrey - Morgan Andrews
- Julia Swayne Gordon - Lida de Jeanne
- Leah Baird - Beth Whitney
- L. Rogers Lytton - Ralph Clark
- Earle Williams - Morgan Andrews
- Edith Storey - Mrs. Andrews
- Harry T. Morey - Murray
