= The Turmoil (novel) =

1915 novel by Booth Tarkington

- Pdf of the book
- Author: Booth Tarkington
- Illustrator: C.E. Chambers
- Language: English
- Genre: Drama; Historical fiction
- Publisher: Harper & Brothers Publishers
- Publication date: 1915
- Publication place: United States
- Media type: Print
- Pages: 349
- Followed by: The Magnificent Ambersons

The Turmoil is a 1915 novel by American author Booth Tarkington. Written when Tarkington was about 50, it became a #1 bestseller. It deals with the transformation of idealized small town life and the relationship of a father and son. It received favorable reviews from critics. The depiction of a clash of wills between a business driven father and his aspiring writer son "finds the golden way of truth, interest, and genuine humor," according to a review in the North American Review.

== Film adaptations ==
The novel has twice been adapted:

- The Turmoil, a 1916 silent film directed by Edgar Jones
- The Turmoil, a 1924 silent film directed by Hobart Henley
