= A Rogue's Romance =

1919 film by James Young

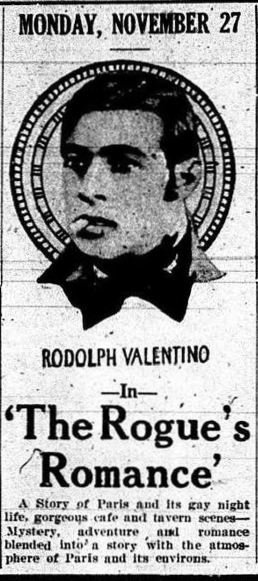
- Newspaper ad for 1922 release of the film promoting Valentino
- Directed by: James Young
- Written by: James Young (scenario)
- Story by: H. H. Van Loan
- Produced by: Albert E. Smith
- Starring: Earle Williams
- Cinematography: Max Dupont
- Distributed by: Vitagraph Company of America
- Release date: June 9, 1919
- Running time: 50 minutes
- Country: United States

A Rogue's Romance is a 1919 American silent crime drama film produced and released by the Vitagraph Company of America. It was directed by James Young and starred matinee star Earle Williams. Rudolph Valentino (billed as Rudolph Volantino), who was then a young unknown dancer, also makes an appearance in a bit part as an Apache dancer. The film is now considered lost.

== Plot ==
As described in a film magazine, Jules Marin, a Paris thief so clever that the police cannot catch him, has been decorated with the Croix de guerre and loves children. He is popular with the underworld and people warn him when the police are coming. He makes an Apache jealous, and this man tells the prefect of police Henri Duval that Marin will be at a particular restaurant. However, Marin is told that one of his adopted orphan, whom he has picked out among the refugees, is sick, and leaves, thus saving himself. On the way to the orphan his car breaks down, and he goes to the home of jeweler Anton Deprenay to get a car. The daughter Mme. Helen is there alone and, believing that he is on a mission of mercy, lets him use the car, with him leaving his military decoration as collateral. The police later follow and take down the number of the car. When the prefect goes to the Deprenays, the car has been returned. Later, at a party, Marin is introduced to Helen as M. Picard, but she recognizes his voice. Marin recognizes a crooked promoter at the party. A necklace is stolen, and Helen suspects Marin, but he proves his innocence and recovers the gems. Helen tells him that when he gets as good a recognition from society as he obtained in the field of battle, she will be his friend. Marin learns that the promoter has a stock market scheme to swindle the community out of millions, so, while posing as an investigator from Scotland Yard, Marin helps the prefect get the money back. He and Helen ride off in an automobile.

== Cast ==
- Earle Williams as Jules Marin/ M. Picard
- Brinsley Shaw as Henri Duval
- Harry Van Meter as Leon Voliere
- Herbert Standing as Anton Deprenay
- Sidney Franklin as Burgomaster
- Karl Formes as Brulon
- Marian Skinner
- Harry Dunkinson
- Mathilde Comont
- Peaches Jackson
- Jenette Trebol
- Pat Moore
- Mrs. Griffith
- William Orlamond
- Rudolph Valentino as An Apache Dancer (credited as Rudolph Volantino)
- Gladys McMurray
- Katherine Adams as Mme. Helen Deprenay
- Maude George as Jeanne Deprenay
