= Restless Souls (1919 film) =

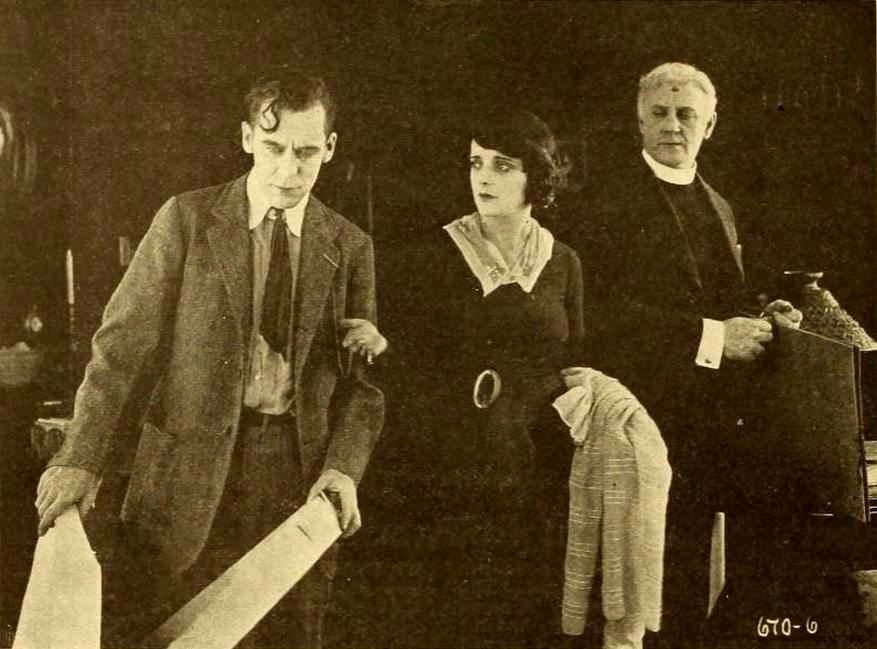
- Directed by: William C. Dowlan
- Written by: Cosmo Hamilton
- Starring: Alma Rubens; Kathryn Adams; Jack Conway
- Production company: Triangle Film Corporation
- Distributed by: Triangle Distributing
- Release date: February 2, 1919
- Running time: 60 minutes
- Country: United States
- Languages: Silent; English intertitles

Restless Souls is a 1919 American silent drama film directed by William C. Dowlan and starring Alma Rubens, Kathryn Adams and Jack Conway.

== Cast ==
- Alma Rubens as Marion Gregory
- Kathryn Adams as Judith Wingate
- Jack Conway as Hugh Gregory
- Harvey Clark as Chester Wingate
- J. Barney Sherry as Dr. Robert Calvert
- Eugene Burr as Oliver Sloan

== Bibliography ==
- Robert B. Connelly. The Silents: Silent Feature Films, 1910-36, Volume 40, Issue 2. December Press, 1998.
