= The Magnificent Ambersons =

1918 novel by Booth Tarkington

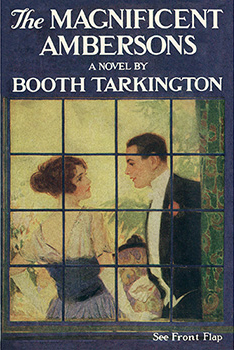
- First edition
- Author: Booth Tarkington
- Language: English
- Publisher: Doubleday, Page
- Publication date: 1918
- Publication place: United States
- Media type: Print
- Pages: 516
- Preceded by: The Turmoil
- Followed by: The Midlander

The Magnificent Ambersons is a 1918 novel by Booth Tarkington, the second in his Growth trilogy, after The Turmoil (1915) and before The Midlander (1923, retitled National Avenue in 1927). It won the Pulitzer Prize for fiction.

In 1925, it was adapted into the silent film Pampered Youth directed by David Smith. In 1942, it was made into The Magnificent Ambersons film written and directed by Orson Welles (though the released version was edited against Welles's wishes). In 2002 came a same-titled TV adaptation based on Welles's screenplay.

== Plot summary ==
The story is set in a largely fictionalized version of Indianapolis, and much of it was inspired by the neighborhood of Woodruff Place.

The novel and trilogy trace the growth of the United States through the declining fortunes of three generations of the aristocratic Amberson family in an upscale Indianapolis neighborhood between the end of the Civil War and the early 20th century, a period of rapid industrialization and socioeconomic change in America. The Ambersons' decline is contrasted with the rising fortunes of industrial tycoons and other new money families, which derive power not from family names but by "doing things." As George Amberson's unspecified friend says, "Don't you think being things is 'rahthuh bettuh' than doing things?"

The Ambersons are the most prosperous and powerful family in town at the turn of the century. The young George Amberson Minafer, the patriarch's grandson, is spoiled terribly by his mother, Isabel. Growing up arrogant, sure of his own worth and position, and totally oblivious to the lives of others, George falls in love with Lucy Morgan, a young but sensible debutante. However, there is a long history between George's mother and Lucy's father of which George is unaware. As the town grows into a city, industry thrives; the Ambersons' prestige and wealth wanes; and the Morgans, thanks to Lucy's prescient father, grow prosperous. When George sabotages his widowed mother's growing affections for Lucy's father, life as he knows it comes to an end.

== Reception ==
The Magnificent Ambersons received the 1919 Pulitzer Prize.

"The Magnificent Ambersons is perhaps Tarkington's best novel," said Van Wyck Brooks. "[It is] a typical story of an American family and town—the great family that locally ruled the roost and vanished virtually in a day as the town spread and darkened into a city. This novel no doubt was a permanent page in the social history of the United States, so admirably conceived and written was the tale of the Ambersons, their house, their fate and the growth of the community in which they were submerged in the end."

== Adaptations ==
=== Radio ===
The Campbell Playhouse presented Orson Welles's one-hour radio adaptation of The Magnificent Ambersons on October 29, 1939. The cast included Welles, Walter Huston, Ray Collins, Everett Sloane, Bea Benaderet, Nan Sunderland, and other members of the Mercury Theatre company.

=== Film ===
The Magnificent Ambersons was adapted by Jay Pilcher for a Vitagraph Pictures feature film titled Pampered Youth (1925), directed by David Smith and starring Cullen Landis, Ben Alexander, Allan Forrest, Alice Calhoun, Emmett King, Wallace MacDonald, Charlotte Merriam, Katheryn Adams, Aggie Herring and William Irving. After Vitagraph was purchased by Warner Bros., the 70-minute film was reedited to 33 minutes and released under the title Two to One (1927). The original film is considered lost.

Orson Welles adapted the story for his second feature film, The Magnificent Ambersons (1942), starring Joseph Cotten, Dolores Costello, Anne Baxter, Tim Holt, Agnes Moorehead, and Ray Collins, with Welles providing the narration. Welles lost control of the editing of the film to RKO Pictures, and the version released to audiences differed significantly from his rough cut. More than an hour of footage was cut by the studio, which also shot and substituted a happier ending. Welles's extensive notes for how he wished the film to be cut have survived, but the excised footage was destroyed. Composer Bernard Herrmann insisted his credit be removed when, like the film itself, his score was heavily edited by the studio. Even in the released version, The Magnificent Ambersons is often regarded as among the best American films ever made.

In 2002, the A&E Network aired its original film The Magnificent Ambersons, directed by Alfonso Arau and starring Madeleine Stowe, Bruce Greenwood, Jonathan Rhys Meyers, Gretchen Mol, Jennifer Tilly, Dina Merrill and James Cromwell.
