= Big Happiness =

1920 film by Colin Campbell

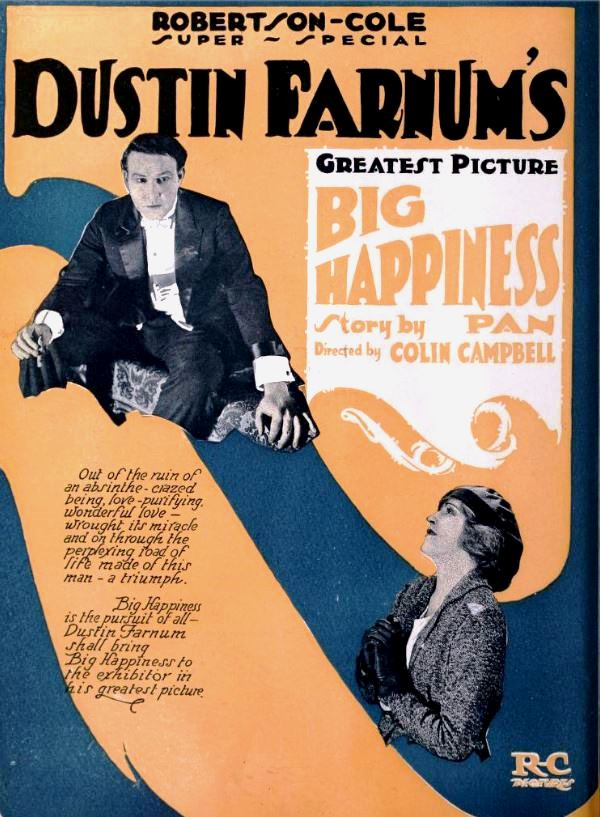
- Directed by: Colin Campbell
- Written by: Jack Cunningham
- Based on: Big Happiness by Pan (aka Leslie Beresford)
- Produced by: Dustin Farnum
- Starring: Dustin Farnum
- Cinematography: Robert Newhard
- Distributed by: Robertson-Cole Distributing Corporation
- Release date: September 5, 1920
- Running time: 7 reels
- Country: United States
- Language: Silent (English intertitles)

Big Happiness is a lost 1920 American silent drama film directed by Colin Campbell and starring Dustin Farnum. It was produced by Dustin Farnum and distributed through Robertson-Cole Distributing Corporation.

== Cast ==
- Dustin Farnum as John Dant / James Dant
- Kathryn Adams as June Dant
- Fred Malatesta as Raoul de Bergerac
- Violet Scram as Mlle DeFarge
- Joseph J. Dowling as Alick Crayshaw
- William H. Brown as Watson
- Aggie Herring as Concierza
