= Earle Williams =

American actor

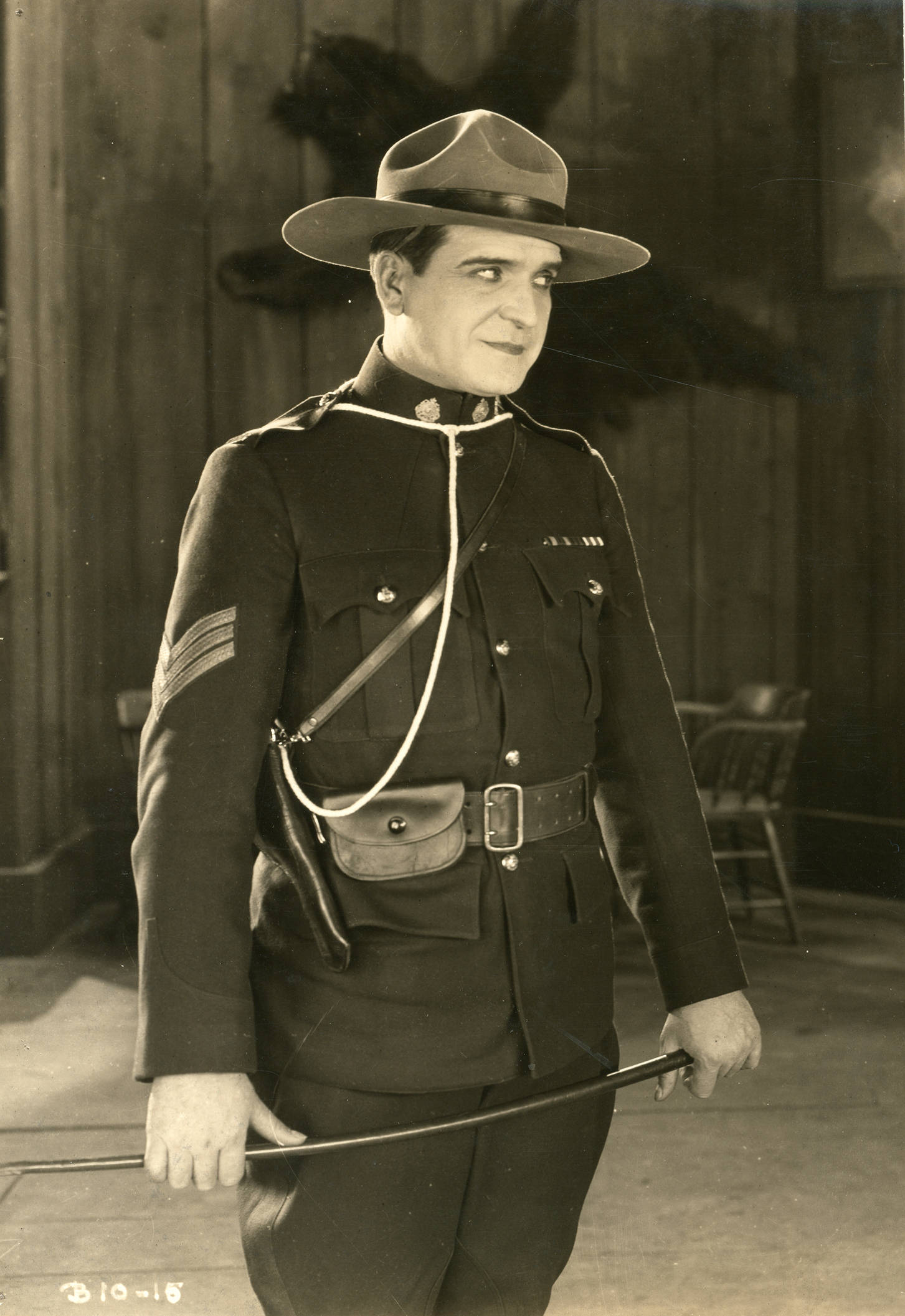
- Williams in 1923
- Born: Earle Raphael Williams; February 28, 1880; Sacramento, California U.S.
- Died: April 25, 1927 (aged 47); Hollywood, California U.S.
- Years active: c. 1899–1927
- Spouse(s): Florine Mahackmo Walz (1918–1927; his death)
- Parent(s): Augustus P. Williams; Eva M. Paget Williams

Earle Williams (born Earle Raphael Williams; February 28, 1880 – April 25, 1927) was an American stage actor and film star in the silent era.

== Early life ==
Williams was born in Sacramento, California, the son of Augustus P. Williams and Eva M. Paget Williams. When he was six years old, he moved with his family to Oakland. Later he attended the Polytechnic College of California. Before he began his acting career, Williams worked in a bicycle shop, competed as a bicycle racer, and served as a newspaper photographer for the Oakland Tribune.

== Stage and film careers ==
After performing in bit parts in Oakland theaters, Williams began professional acting in earnest in 1901 with the Baldwin-Melville Stock Company in New Orleans. He went on from there to act in the Alcazaar Theater's stock company in San Francisco and with a touring company in Canada and the United States.

In 1908, he joined the Vitagraph film company, becoming its leading man in the 1910s, Williams was voted America's number one star in 1915, starting his career on stage as a teenager, the year he made his most popular film, The Juggernaut. Vitagraph wrecked a real train in this action melodrama, which co-starred Williams with his most frequent leading lady, Anita Stewart. They were also teamed in the studio's earliest entry in the then-popular serial genre, The Goddess in 1915, and Williams made a dashing gentleman thief in Vitagraph's 1917 version of the ever popular Arsene Lupin. He often portrayed stalwart military heroes into the 1920s.

== Personal life, death, and family tragedy ==
Williams married New York native Florine Mahackmo Walz in October 1918. Nine years later, at age 47, he died in Hollywood, California, reportedly due to bronchial pneumonia. Following his death, his wife Florine lost most of the money from his estate through bad investments. By 1931 she had become so desperate for cash that she resorted to writing checks with insufficient funds in the bank and to forging signatures. Her previous arrests for dispersing bad checks and other financial and personal setbacks finally prompted the 33-year-old widow, who was on probation at the time in San Francisco, and her 80-year-old mother to commit suicide together by inhaling excessive amounts of chloroform. Death, according to news reports, appeared to be preferable for the two women rather than facing further humiliations for their family. Before their own deaths, the women used the same method of saturating rolls of cotton with chloroform to sedate and murder Florine's six-year-old daughter and three-year-old son.

== Selected filmography ==
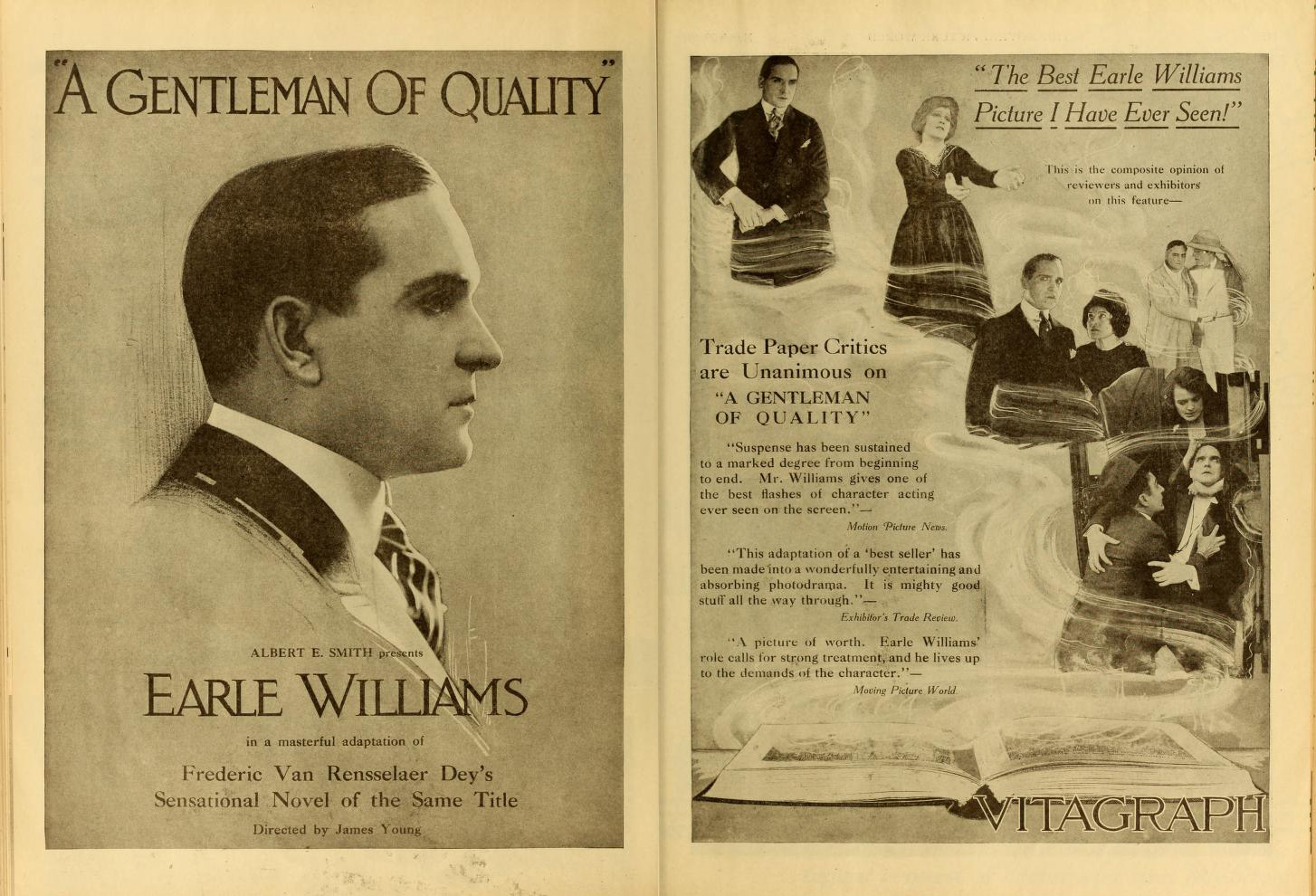
A Gentleman of Quality (1919)

- A Tale of Two Cities (1911)
- The Military Air-Scout (1911)
- Red and White Roses (1913)
- Hearts of the First Empire (1913)
- Bunny Dips Into Society (1913)
- The Christian (1914)
- My Official Wife (1914)
- The Scarlet Runner (1916)
- The Maelstrom (1917)
- Arsene Lupin (1917)
- The Grell Mystery (1917)
- The Stolen Treaty (1917)
- A Diplomatic Mission (1918)
- A Gentleman of Quality (1919)
- Two Women (1919)
- When a Man Loves (1919)
- A Rogue's Romance (1919)
- The Black Gate (1919)
- The Purple Cipher (1920)
- Captain Swift (1920)
- The Romance Promoters (1920)
- A Master Stroke (1920)
- The Fortune Hunter (1920)
- It Can Be Done (1921)
- Bring Him In (1921)
- The Silver Car (1921)
- Lucky Carson (1921)
- Diamonds Adrift (1921)
- Restless Souls (1922)
- The Man from Downing Street (1922)
- Fortune's Mask (1922)
- The Eternal Struggle (1923)
- Jealous Husbands (1923)
- Masters of Men (1923)
- Borrowed Husbands (1924)
- Was It Bigamy? (1925)
- Lena Rivers (1925)
- The Adventurous Sex (1925)
- The Ancient Mariner (1925)
- The Skyrocket (1926)
- Diplomacy (1926)
- You'd Be Surprised (1926)
- She's My Baby (1927)
- Say It with Diamonds (1927)
