= Jealous Husbands =

1923 film by Maurice Tourneur

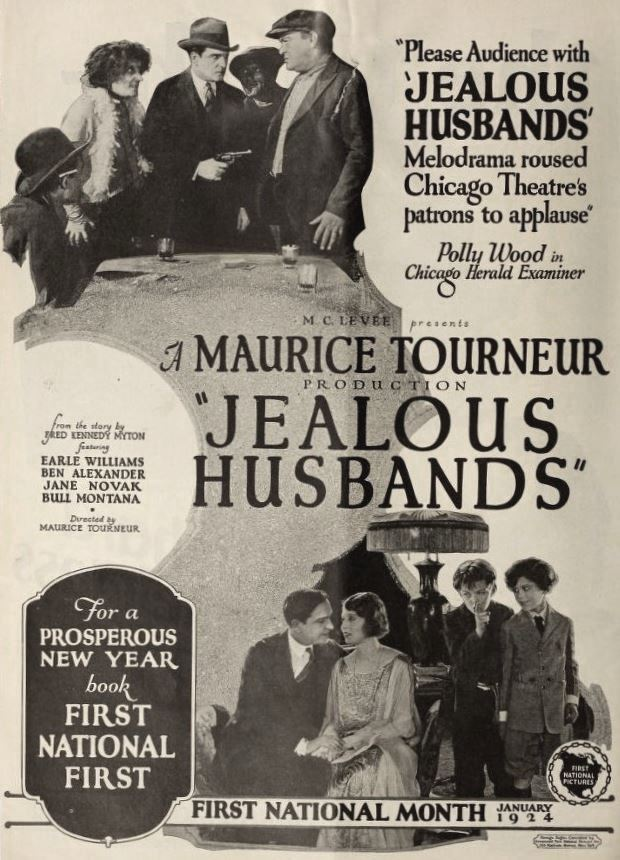
- Advertisement
- Directed by: Maurice Tourneur
- Written by: Pierre Decourcelle (play); Fred Myton
- Produced by: Maurice Tourneur
- Starring: Earle Williams; Jane Novak; Ben Alexander
- Cinematography: Scott R. Beal
- Production company: Maurice Tourneur Productions
- Distributed by: Associated First National Pictures
- Release date: November 12, 1923
- Running time: 70 minutes; 7 reels
- Country: United States
- Language: Silent (English intertitles)

Jealous Husbands is a 1923 American silent drama film directed by Maurice Tourneur and starring Earle Williams, Jane Novak, and Ben Alexander.

== Plot ==
As described in a film magazine review, returning from Europe, Ramón Martinez overhears a conversation which causes him to doubt the fidelity of Alice, his wife. On reaching home, who is away. He finds a note among her belongings which increases his suspicions. A burglar appears and is made the instrument of Ramón's revenge, being hired to abduct Ramón's little son. The son grows up in the company of Romani people. Years later, he is found by his real parents and a packet of letters turns up which establishes Alice's innocence, leading to happiness for all.

== Cast ==
- Earle Williams as Ramón Martinez
- Jane Novak as Alice Martinez
- Ben Alexander as Bobbie
- Marion Feducha as Sliver
- George Siegmann as 'Red' Lynch
- Emily Fitzroy as Amaryllis
- Bull Montana as Portland Kid
- J. Gunnis Davis as Sniffer Charlie
- Carl Miller as Harvey Clegg
- Wedgwood Nowell as George Conrad
- Carmelita Geraghty as Carmen Inez

== Preservation ==
With no prints of Jealous Husbands located in any film archives, it is a lost film.

== Bibliography ==
- Waldman, Harry. Maurice Tourneur: The Life and Films. McFarland & Co., 2001. ISBN 0-7864-0957-6
