= The Silver Car =

1921 film

The Silver Car (aka:Secret of the Silver Car)
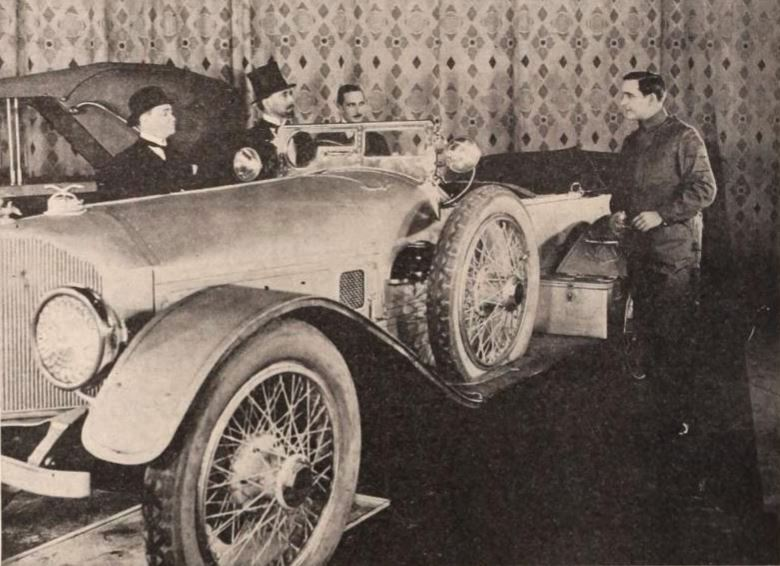
- Directed by: David Smith
- Written by: Wyndham Martin(story)
- Produced by: Vitagraph Company; Albert E. Smith
- Starring: Earle Williams; Kathryn Adams
- Cinematography: Jack MacKenzie
- Distributed by: Vitagraph Company
- Release date: June 1921
- Running time: 6 reels
- Country: USA
- Language: Silent..English titles

The Silver Car is a lost 1921 silent crime film directed by David Smith starring Earle Williams and Kathryn Adams. It was produced and distributed by the Vitagraph Company.

== Cast ==
- Earle Williams - Anthony Trent
- Kathryn Adams - Daphne Grenvil
- Geoffrey Webb - Arthur Grenvil
- Eric Mayne - Count Michael Temesvar
- Emmett King - Earl of Rosecarrel
- Mona Lisa - Pauline
- John Steppling - Vicar
- Max Asher - Hentzi
- Walter Rodgers - Colonel Langley
