= Borrowed Husbands =

1924 film directed by David Smith

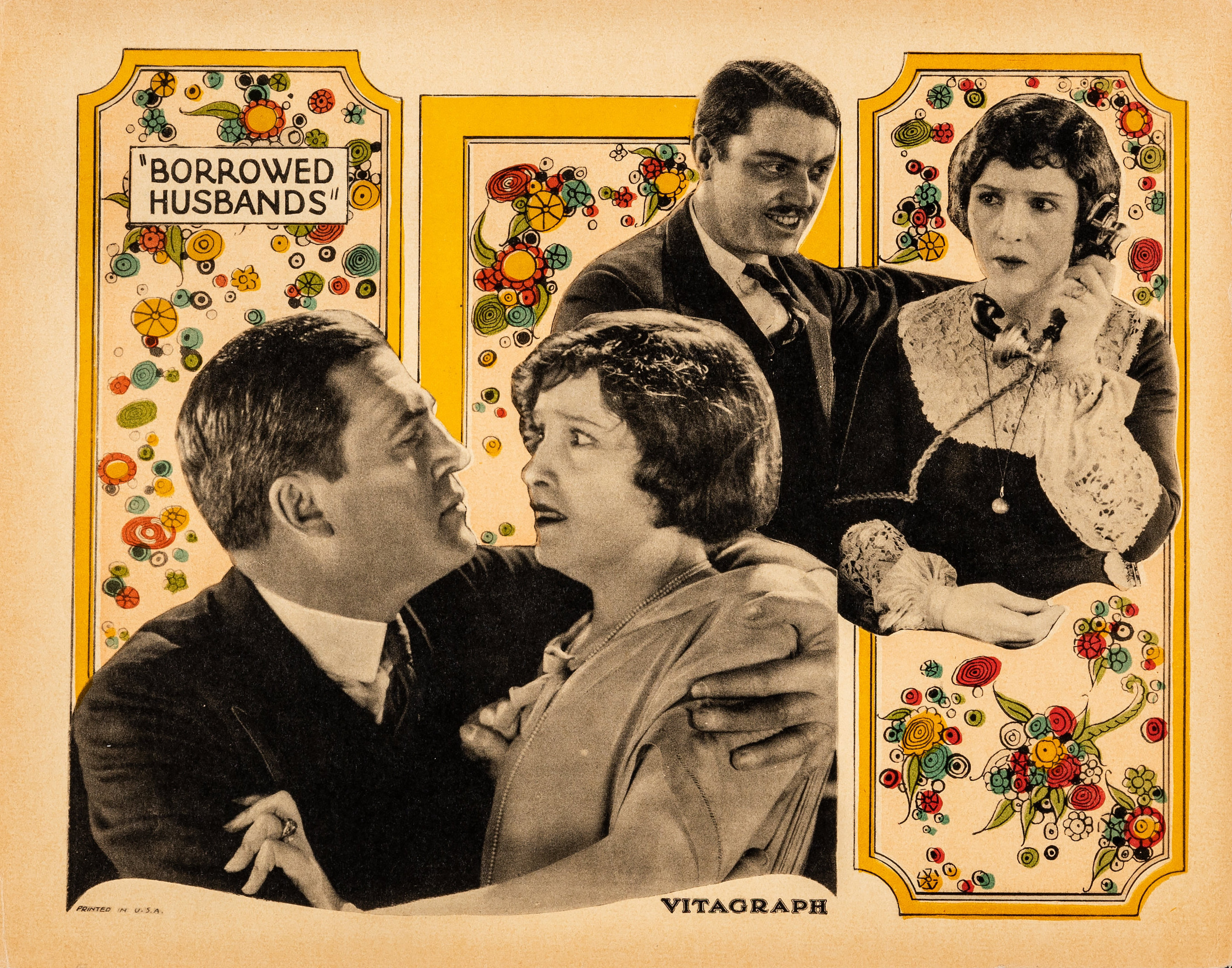
- Lobby card
- Directed by: David Smith
- Written by: C. Graham Baker
- Story by: Mildred K. Barbour
- Produced by: Albert E. Smith
- Starring: Florence Vidor
- Cinematography: Steve Smith
- Distributed by: Vitagraph Company of America
- Release date: April 13, 1924
- Running time: 7 reels
- Country: United States
- Language: Silent (English intertitles)

Borrowed Husbands is a 1924 American silent comedy film directed by David Smith and starring Florence Vidor. It was produced and distributed by Vitagraph Company of America.

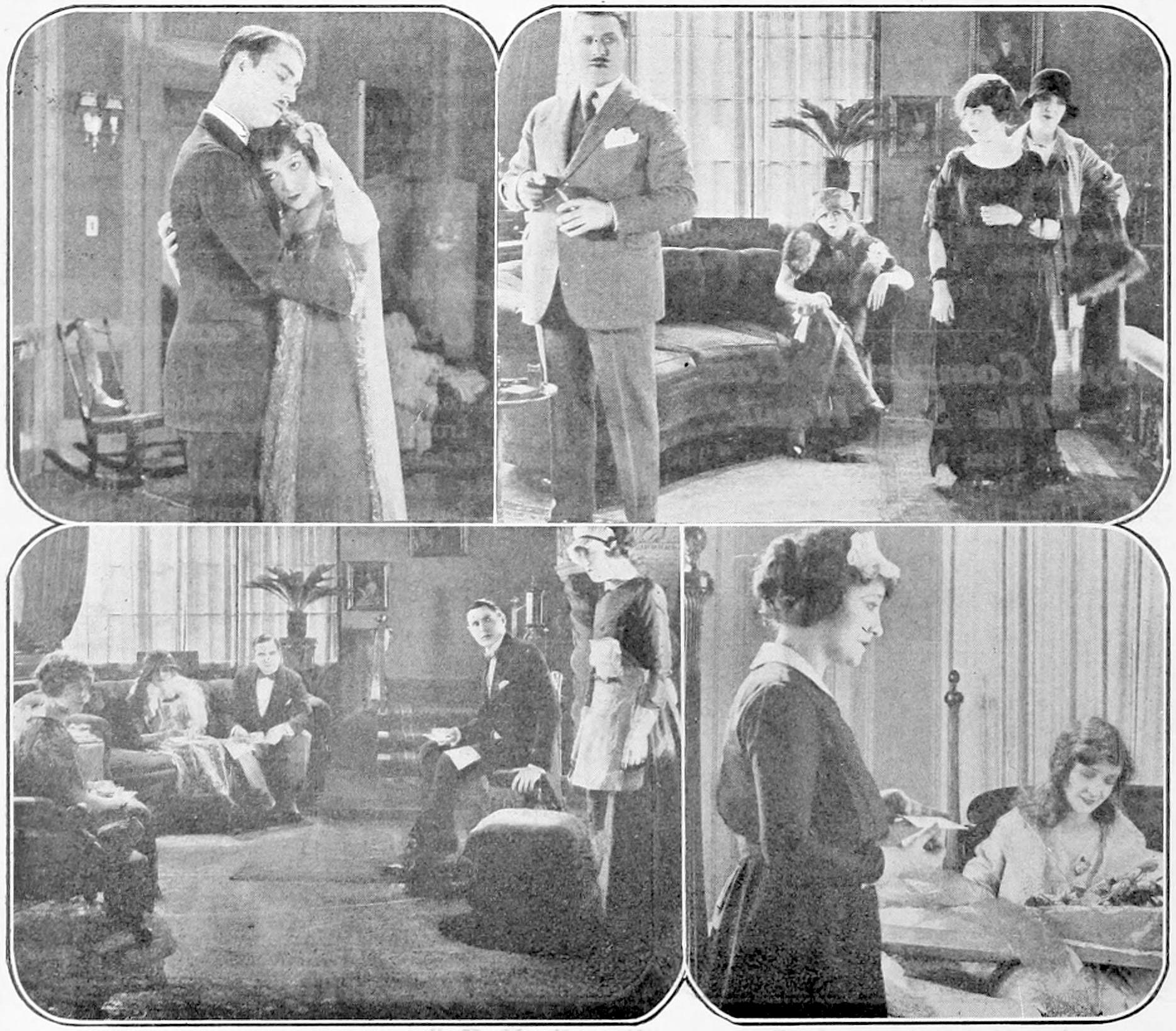
Publicity photos for the film.

== Plot ==
As described in a film magazine review, Nancy Burrard's husband Gerard goes on a business trip to South America and she beguiles the lonely hours by borrowing a few husbands for flirtations purposes, and engaging in a flirtation with Major Desmond, who supposes her to be a widow. He meets her husband in South America, where the truth is made known to him. Many complications result through the philandering of Dr. Langwell with various married women and a nurse, who dies under suspicious circumstances. The martial troubles of the different wives are finally dispelled, and Nancy and her husband are reconciled so that all ends well.

== Cast ==
- Florence Vidor as Nancy Burrard
- Rockliffe Fellowes as Dr. Langwell
- Earle Williams as Major Desmond
- Robert Gordon as Gerald Burrard
- Kathryn Adams as Edith Langwell
- Violet Palmer as Constance Stanley
- Alpheus Lincoln as Reeve Lewis
- Claire Du Brey as Peggy Fleurette
- Charlotte Merriam as Peggy Lewis
- J. W. Irving as Curtis Stanley
- Ynez Seabury

== Preservation ==
With no prints of Borrowed Husbands located in any film archives, it is a lost film.
