= The Man from Downing Street =

1922 film

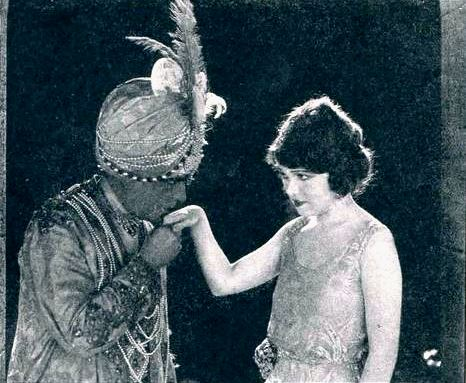
- Still with Earle Williams (disguised as a Rajah) and Betty Ross Clarke
- Directed by: Edward José
- Written by: Bradley J. Smollen (screenplay); Lottie Horner (story); Clyde Westover (story); Florine Williams (story)
- Produced by: Albert E. Smith
- Starring: Earle Williams; Charles Hill Mailes; Boris Karloff; Betty Ross Clarke
- Cinematography: Ernest F. Smith
- Distributed by: Vitagraph Studios
- Release date: April 2, 1922
- Running time: 5 reels (50 minutes)
- Country: United States
- Language: Silent (English intertitles)

The Man from Downing Street is a 1922 American silent starring Earle Williams, Charles Hill Mailes, Betty Ross Clark and Boris Karloff. The screenplay was written by Bradley J. Smollen, based on a screen story by Clyde C. Westover, Lottie Horner and Florine Williams. It is thought to be a lost film.

== Plot ==
Captain Robert Kent of the London Secret Service is assigned to Delhi to discover the person responsible for the passing out of government information from the British Commission in India. He is disguised as a Rajah and is the guest of Colonel Wentworth, who is in charge of the district. Wentworth is the only one who knows Kent's identity, and the two follow up on one clue after another as several persons become implicated. Finally, only two men remain as the logical suspects. To catch the guilty party, Kent confides to the Colonel that he has issued instructions to the London office to send cables to each of the two suspects on two different matters of commercial importance with the idea being that the subsequent leak of information would reveal the guilty party. The plan works and guilt is attached to Captain Graves, whom Colonel Wentworth claims has started a rumor on the subject suggested in one of the cables. However, the fact that the Colonel has accused Captain Graves proves that the Colonel was the guilty party as Captain Kent announces that neither of the two cables had ever actually been sent. Trapped, the Colonel is forced to confess.

== Cast ==
- Earle Williams as Capt. Robert Kent
- Charles Hill Mailes as Col. Wentworth
- Boris Karloff dual role as Maharajah Jehan Dharwar and Dell Monckton
- Kathryn Adams as Norma Graves
- Herbert Prior as Capt. Graves
- Eugenia Gilbert as Sarissa
- James Butler as Lt. Wyndham
- George Stanley as Sir Edward Craig
- Henry A. Barrows as Maj. Barnham

== See also ==
- Boris Karloff filmography
