= Uncharted Channels =

1920 film by Henry King

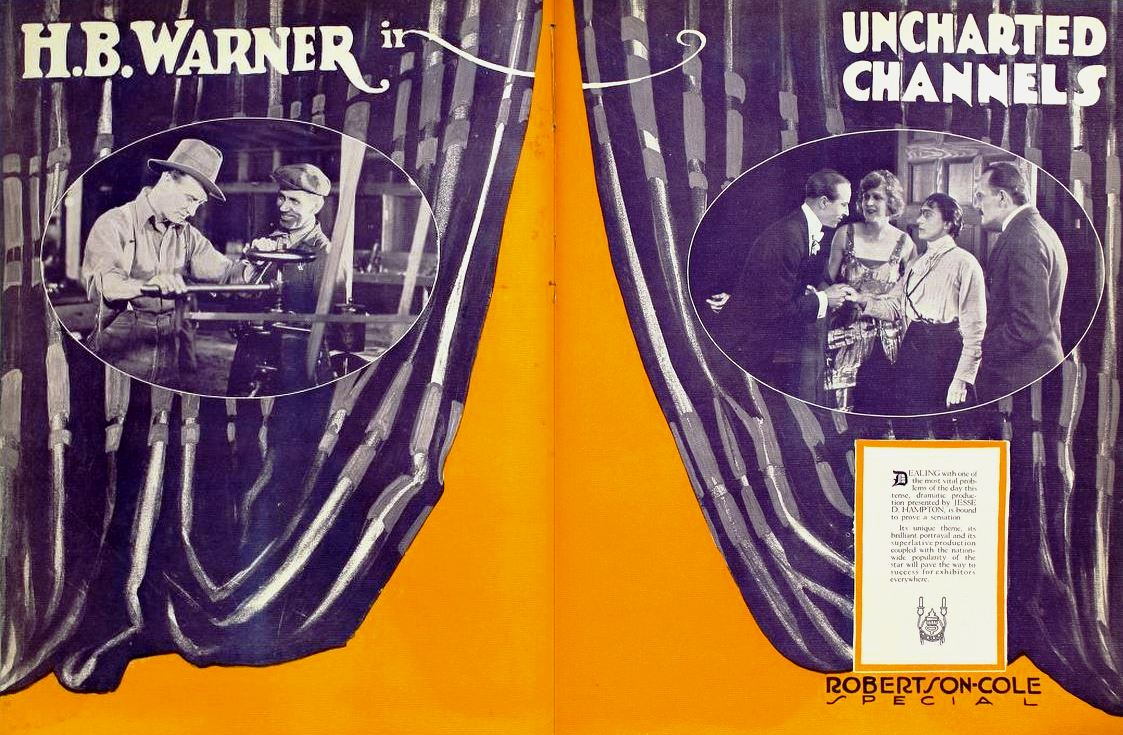
- Advertisement
- Directed by: Henry King
- Produced by: Jesse D. Hampton
- Starring: H. B. Warner; Kathryn Adams; Sam De Grasse
- Production company: Jesse D. Hampton Productions
- Distributed by: Robertson-Cole Distributing Corporation
- Release date: June 1920
- Running time: 60 minutes
- Country: United States
- Languages: Silent; English intertitles

Uncharted Channels is a 1920 American silent drama film directed by Henry King and starring H. B. Warner, Kathryn Adams and Sam De Grasse.

== Cast ==
- H. B. Warner as Timothy Webb Jr
- Kathryn Adams as Sylvia Kingston
- Sam De Grasse as Nicholas Schonnn
- Evelyn Selbie as Elsa Smolski
- William Elmer as Jim Baker
- Percy Challenger as Roger Webb
- Thomas Persse as Peter Hines
- J. P. Lockney as Thomas Empey

== Bibliography ==
- Donald W. McCaffrey & Christopher P. Jacobs. Guide to the Silent Years of American Cinema. Greenwood Publishing, 1999. ISBN 0-313-30345-2
