= The Vicar of Wakefield (1917 film) =

1917 film by Ernest C. Warde

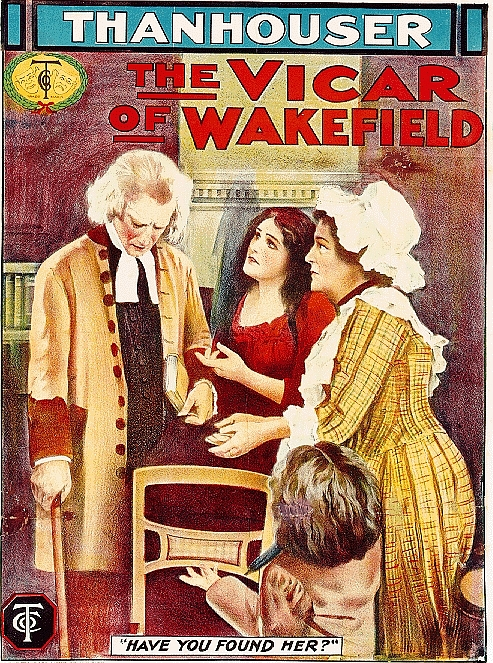
- poster to Thanhauser's 1910 version of the same story
- Directed by: Ernest C. Warde
- Written by: Oliver Goldsmith (novel); Emmett Mixx
- Produced by: Edwin Thanhouser
- Starring: Frederick Warde; Boyd Marshall; Kathryn Adams
- Cinematography: William Zollinger
- Production company: Thanhouser Film Corporation
- Distributed by: Pathé Exchange
- Release date: February 25, 1917
- Running time: 90 minutes
- Country: United States
- Languages: Silent; English intertitles

The Vicar of Wakefield (1917)

The Vicar of Wakefield is a 1917 American silent historical drama film directed by Ernest C. Warde and starring Frederick Warde, Boyd Marshall and Kathryn Adams. It is based on the 1766 novel The Vicar of Wakefield by Oliver Goldsmith. Unlike many productions of the era, the film still survives.

== Cast ==
- Frederick Warde as Vicar of Wakefield
- Boyd Marshall as George Primrose
- Kathryn Adams as Olivia Primrose
- Gladys Leslie as Sophia Primrose
- Thomas A. Curran as Knight Geoffrey / Mr. Burchell
- Robert Vaughn as Squire Thornhill / Squire Wilmot
- Carey L. Hastings as Mrs. Primrose
- William Parke Jr. as Moses Primrose
- Tula Belle as Dick Primrose
- Barbara Howard as Bill Primrose
- Grace DeCarlton as Arabella Wilmot
- Arthur Bauer as Mr. Wilmot
- Morgan Jones as Jenkinson

== Bibliography ==
- Richard Lewis Ward. When the Cock Crows: A History of the Pathé Exchange. SIU Press, 2016.
