= A Gentleman of Quality =

1919 film by James Young

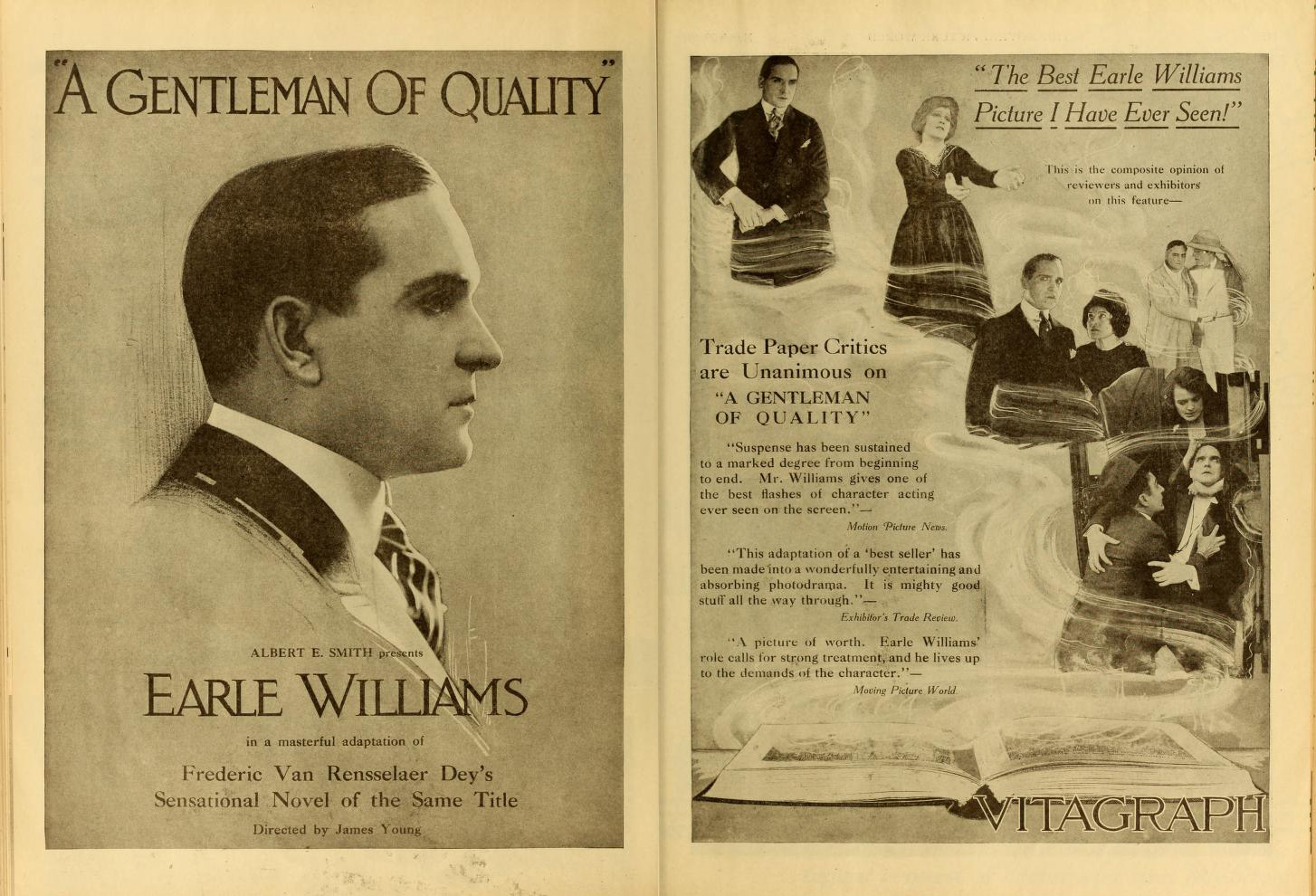
- Advertising for A Gentleman of Quality on the Moving Picture World (March 1919).
- Directed by: James Young
- Written by: Edward J. Montagne
- Based on: A Gentleman of Quality by Frederick Van Rensselaer Dey
- Starring: Earle Williams; Kathryn Adams; Joyce Moore; James Carpenter; Robert Bolder
- Cinematography: Max Dupont
- Production company: Vitagraph Company of America
- Distributed by: Vitagraph Company of America
- Release date: March 17, 1919
- Running time: 5 reels
- Country: United States
- Languages: Silent film (English intertitles)

A Gentleman of Quality is a 1919 American silent drama film directed by James Young and starring Earle Williams, Kathryn Adams, Joyce Moore, James Carpenter, and Robert Bolder. It is based on the 1909 novel of the same name by Frederick Van Rensselaer Dey. The film was released by Vitagraph Company of America on March 17, 1919.

== Cast ==
- Earle Williams as John Ashton / Lord John Hartford
- Kathryn Adams as Lady Mercy Covington
- Joyce Moore as Hope Hollister
- James Carpenter as Harry Hollister
- Robert Bolder as Robert
- George C. Pearce as Dean Douglas
- Ronald Byram as Richard Hertford

== Preservation ==
The film is now considered lost.

== See also ==
- List of lost films
