= The Juggernaut =

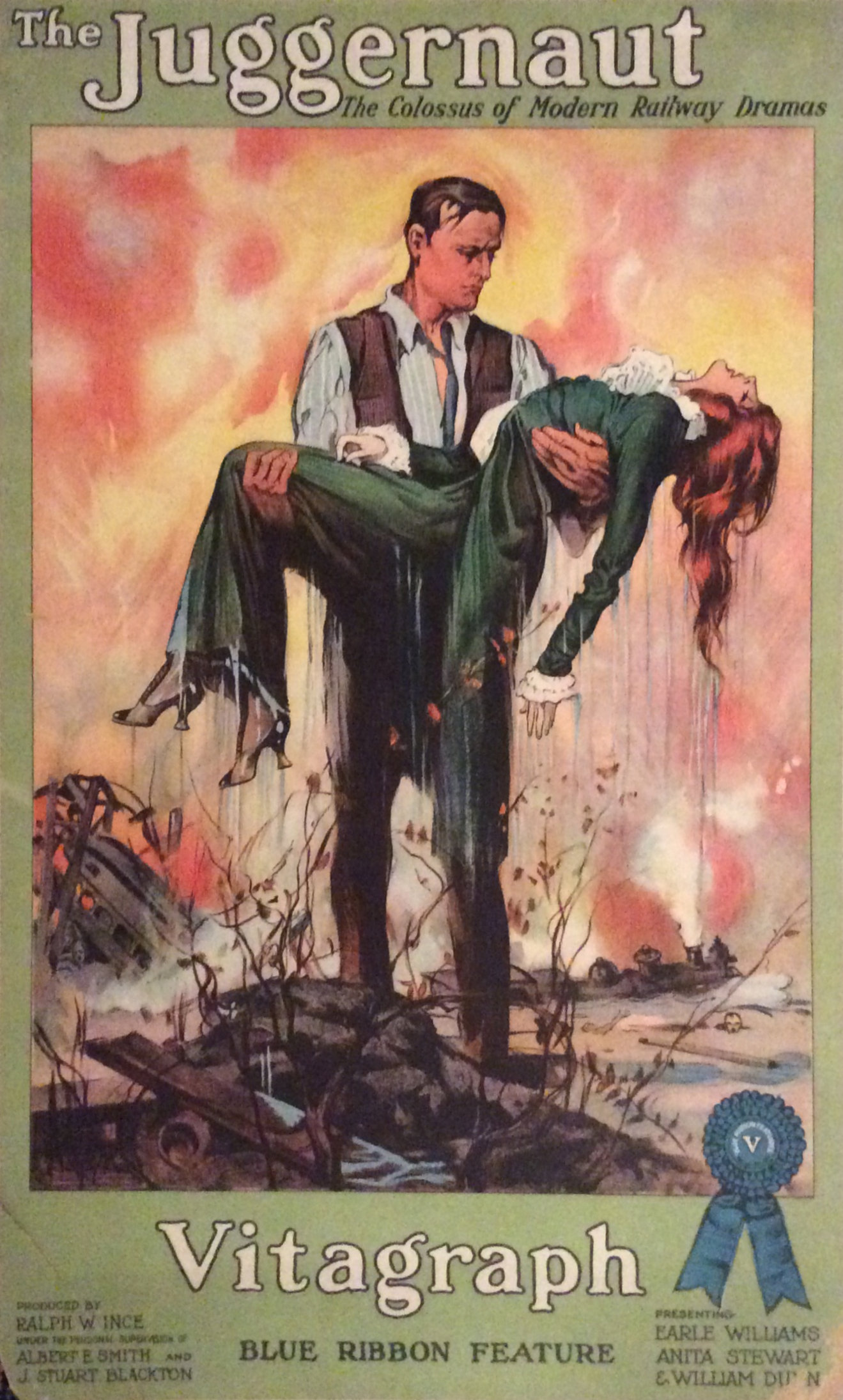
- Poster
- Directed by: Ralph W. Ince
- Written by: Donald I. Buchanan; Ralph W. Ince
- Produced by: Albert E. Smith; J. Stuart Blackton
- Starring: Earle Williams; Anita Stewart
- Cinematography: William S. Adams; William T. Stuart; Walter Arthur
- Production company: Vitagraph Company of America
- Release date: April 19, 1915
- Running time: 5 reels
- Country: United States
- Languages: Silent; English intertitles

The Juggernaut is a silent train disaster drama film produced by the Vitagraph Company of America and released on April 19, 1915. It was directed by Ralph W. Ince and stars Earle Williams and Anita Stewart.

== Plot ==
John Ballard's (Earle Williams) parents are killed in a railroad accident. In college, he meets and becomes friends with Philip Hardin (William R. Dunn), the son of the railroad owner. Philip plays poker with a gang of sharpers and a fight breaks out when he discovers he is being cheated. Red Hogan (Jack Brawn), the chief of the gang, would have killed Philip, but John rushes in and breaks a chair over his head. Red Hogan is apparently killed. No one knows who did it and Philip swears he will never reveal John's secret.

After graduation, John meets Viola Ruskin (Anita Stewart) and the two fall in love. Philip has run into debt and his father (Frank Currier) threatens to cut him off if he does not marry and settle down. With the Hardin fortune in mind, Viola's mother (Julia Swayne Gordon) forces her to marry Philip. She dies a year later after giving birth to a daughter, Louise.

Twenty years later, John is the District Attorney and he brings a suit against the railroad. Although Philip owns it, he has little involvement in its operation. Chester Jordon (Paul Scardon), one of the company's largest shareholders, has real control of the line and is maximizing profits by cutting maintenance and safety measures. Philip would blackmail John into silence, but Louise (Anita Stewart) discovers that John did not actually kill Red Hogan after all.

Philip is indicted and goes to trial. John's case against the railroad is strong. At recess, Philip calls Louise for documents kept in his home safe. Her car breaks down on the way and she telegraphs that she will come on the train. Meanwhile, a railroad inspector discovers that the bridge her train will cross is in imminent danger of collapse. Philip races to catch the train but is too late. The bridge breaks apart and the train crashes into the water, its boiler exploding.

The Juggernaut had three endings. At the premiere, John rushes to the scene and pulls Louise from the wreckage, but she is dead. Alternately, he finds her in a coma and she is taken to the hospital. After several days, she awakens and John is there to profess his love to her. When the film was released in Britain, the happy ending was retained but greatly shortened, with Louise waking up just after being dragged ashore.

== Cast ==
- Earle Williams - John Ballard
- Anita Stewart - Viola Ruskin / Louise Hardin
- William R. Dunn - Philip Hardin
- Julia Swayne Gordon - Mrs. Ruskin
- Eulalie Jensen - Mrs. Ballard
- Frank Currier - James Hardin
- Paul Scardon - Chester Jordon
- Jack Brawn - Red Hogan

== Behind the Scenes ==
The final scene of The Juggernaut was shot at South River, New Jersey on September 27, 1914. To produce this scene, Director Ralph Ince found an old quarry about a mile away from a railroad that could be transformed into a believable riverbed. After filling the quarry, railroad builders then laid down 100 yards of track that connected from the main line railroad to the quarry. For the train, an old engine from the scrap heap and three old passenger cars were brought up, painted, and converted into what looked like a functioning locomotive. The setup of the scene alone had cost over $25,000 by the time everything was ready for filming.

Before filming of the scene could properly start, crowds of people who came from the surrounding areas to watch the shoot were found standing within the shot. It took two hours for Ralph Ince and his staff to move the thousands of people from their positions to behind their cameras and out of the shot. Once the crowds were out of the way, the twenty-five cameras began rolling and the train was sent on its way to the river. The train was going at a steady pace of fifteen miles an hour once the driver had bailed out, but before it could make it to the river the engine sped up to double that speed, risking it derailing. The danger of a derailment caused some of the crowd to move out of position, but the train made it to the river and promptly crashed while splashing one of the cameras overlooking the event.

The next part of the scene required around twenty-five actors to go into the wrecked passenger cars to act as if escaping the crash. Once the cameras start rolling, the actors would then climb out of the wreck and swim to shore. But before the next shots could be taken, the crowds of spectators were found surrounding the wreckage, forcing the staff to move them once again out of camera view as to not compromise the shot. While the crowds were being moved, the actors were waiting in freezing waters inside of the passenger cars. By the time the actors were told to swim to shore, many were too cold to swim all the way and had to be rescued by. At first, the people on the crowds and staff believed that the actors cries for help were part of the show and did not intervein for some time before realizing that help was needed. Four actors working for the Vitagraph Company, including Rose Dugan, Mary Green, Earle Williams, and Dick Ardmore were nearly killed due to injuries sustained while swimming across the quarry to shore.

It was previously stated that this scene cost $50,000 to produce, which is incorrect. The film cost $50,000 to produce, and the scene cost $25,000.

== Survival status ==
The Juggernaut was originally five reels long, but only two are known to survive today. These exist in private collections. The film has been reconstructed twice using production stills and title cards to replace the missing material. The 2012 reconstruction was 30 minutes long and the 2017 reconstruction 62 minutes. Both were produced by Harpodeon. The original film would have been between 60 and 80 minutes long, depending on projection speed.

== Associated media ==
Dorothy Donnell published a novelization of The Juggernaut in the April 1915 issue of Motion Picture Magazine
