= The Best of Luck =

1920 film

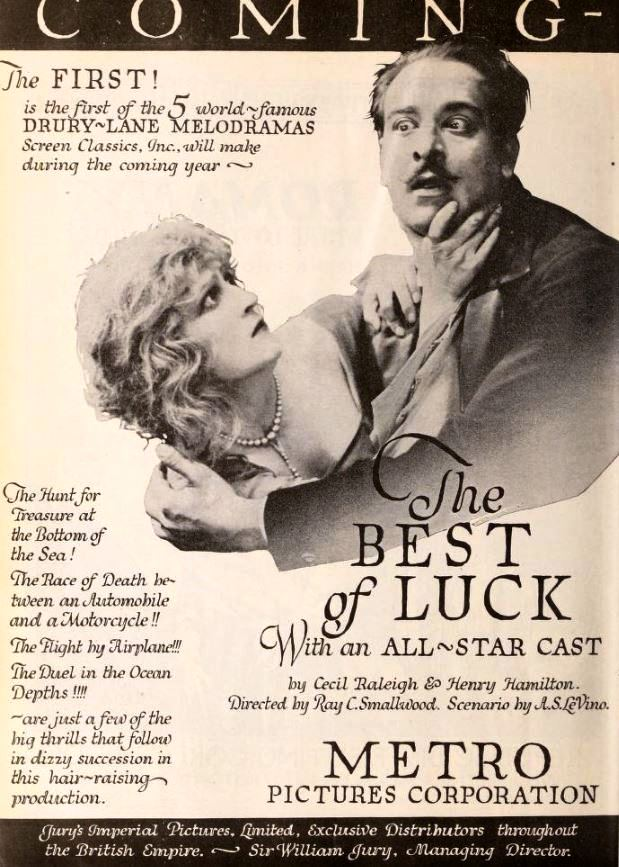
- Directed by: Ray C. Smallwood
- Written by: Arthur Collins (play); Henry Hamilton (play); Cecil Raleigh (play); Albert S. Le Vino
- Starring: Kathryn Adams; Jack Holt; Lila Leslie
- Cinematography: Harold Wenstrom
- Production company: Screen Classics
- Distributed by: Metro Pictures
- Release date: July 1920
- Running time: 6 reels
- Country: United States
- Languages: Silent; English intertitles

The Best of Luck is a 1920 American silent drama film directed by Ray C. Smallwood and starring Kathryn Adams, Jack Holt and Lila Leslie. It was adapted from a British play which had been a hit in the West End. A young American woman moves to Scotland and purchases an ancestral castle. She is pursued by two suitors, one a British nobleman and the other an underhand Spaniard.

== Cast ==
- Kathryn Adams as Leslie MacLeod
- Jack Holt as Kenneth, Lord Glenayr
- Lila Leslie as Lady Blanche Westamere
- Fred Malatesta as Lanzana
- Frances Raymond as The Countess of Strathcaird
- Emmett King as Blake, an American attorney
- Robert Dunbar as The General
- Effie Conley as Maid
- John Underhill as The Footman

== Bibliography ==
- Goble, Alan. The Complete Index to Literary Sources in Film. Walter de Gruyter, 1999.
