= The Adventurous Sex =

1925 film directed by Charles Giblyn

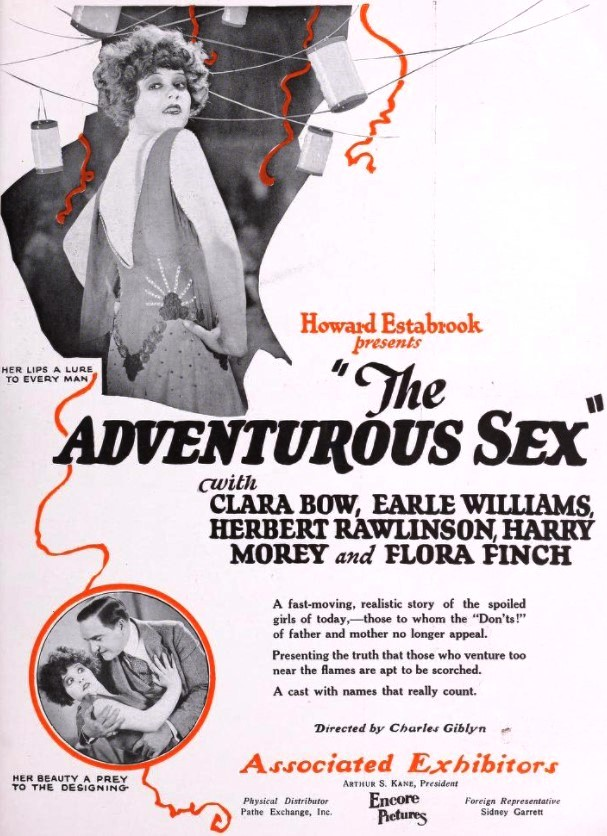
- Advertisement
- Directed by: Charles Giblyn
- Written by: Carl Stearns Clancy
- Story by: Hamilton Mannon
- Produced by: Howard Estabrook
- Starring: Clara Bow; Herbert Rawlinson; Earle Williams
- Cinematography: George Peters; Albert Wetzel
- Production company: Howard Estabrook Productions
- Distributed by: Associated Exhibitors
- Release date: June 12, 1925
- Running time: 6 reels (approximately 60-70 minutes)
- Country: United States
- Language: Silent (English intertitles)

The Adventurous Sex is a lost 1925 American silent drama film that was directed by Charles Giblyn and starred Clara Bow, Herbert Rawlinson, and Earle Williams. The Howard Estabrook production was shot in studios in New York City and on location at Niagara Falls.

The Library of Congress includes this film among the National Film Preservation Board's updated 2021 list of "7,200 Lost U.S. Silent Feature Films" produced between 1912 and 1929.

== Plot ==
Rodney Adams spends too much time maintaining and flying his airplane, so much so that he neglects his fiancée Patricia, who is also tiring of her parents' efforts to control her behavior and limit her socializing. Soon she embarks on a more independent "flapper" lifestyle that includes wild parties and other excesses that attract the attention of Victor Ashley, a handsome but lecherous "adventurer". Her interactions with Victor result in a situation where they are later found together in a room at a roadside inn. Although nothing intimate had occurred between the two, Victor lies to a group of his friends and Rodney as they arrive at the inn. Victor tells them he has married "Pat". She rushes out frantically, devastated by the circumstances that have "soiled" her reputation. Rodney, though, soon learns the truth from the innkeeper, that Victor is lying about everything, Rodney begins searching for his fiancée, who is wandering along the nearby Niagara River. Unable to cope with the disgrace, Pat now attempts suicide by hurling herself into the water. Rodney sees her and dives in to save her as the rapid current sweeps her toward the great falls. With the aid of another pilot guiding his airplane overhead and lowering a rope ladder, Rodney manages to rescue Pat just moments before she would have plummeted to her death over the edge of the falls. The film ends with the young couple happily reunited.

== Cast ==
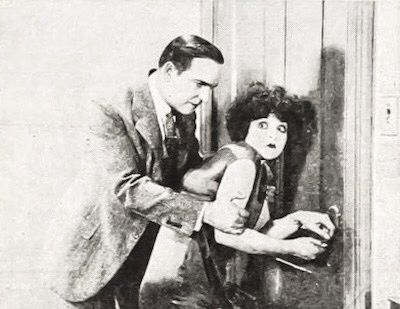
Still of the worldly "adventurer" (Earle Williams) trying to prevent Patricia (Clara Bow) from leaving the room at the roadside inn

- Clara Bow as Patricia Webster
- Herbert Rawlinson as Rodney Adams
- Earle Williams as Victor Ashley, the "adventurer"
- Flora Finch as Patricia's grandmother
- Lillian Beck as Mrs. Webster, the mother
- Harry T. Morey as Mr. Webster, the father
- Edna Giblyn as Mrs. Adams
- Joseph Burke as proprietor of Pinelawn Inn
- Doris Freeman as Lulu
- Mae Atwood as Winnie Allen
- Wilton Lackaye, Jr. as Stephen Lask
- George Decarlton as Dr. Winchell
- Alton Hamilton as Harry Rand

== Production ==
In September 1924, as part of pre-production planning, director Giblyn traveled with his assistant director Bert Siebel and producer Estabrook to the region around Niagara, New York. There they scouted for the most suitable locations for the script's dramatic outdoor scenes once filming commenced. In addition to choosing sites at Niagara Falls, they also chose locations at nearby Three Sisters Islands and at Ausable Chasm much farther away in the Adirondack Mountains. By mid-October the New York-based trade paper The Film Daily was reporting to its readers that Metropolitan Casting, on behalf of Estabrook Productions, had officially contracted or "engaged" Herbert Rawlinson, Earle Williams, and Clara Bow to costar in the upcoming motion picture. The paper in the same issue also announced that some of the project's "players" had already left California and were en route by train to New York City. Within days of her arrival in Manhattan, on October 20, Bow and her fellow cast members began filming the script's interior scenes at the facilities of Tec-Art Studios, which were located on 44th Street and at 318 East 48th Street.

News updates on the film's progress in the final quarter of 1924 document that production work at Tec-Art and location shooting at Niagara Falls were completed in just three weeks, between the last week in October and mid-November. The company's filming at Niagara drew many curious spectators from the surrounding community and resulted in the near fatality of a stunt performer. In its November 29 issue the trade weekly Moving Picture World describes that location work:

A troupe of 4 picture actors under the direction of Charles Giblin [sic]...and three stars, flirted with the rapids of the Niagara river off the Three Sister Island last week, making "The Adventurous Sex"...The stars were Henry Rawlinsom, Clara Bow, and Earl [sic] Williams. A vast crowd gathered as Clara in flimsy garments was rescued from the rapids by Rawlinson. Later in the week William Tyndal, 23 years old, of New York, was seriously injured when the plane he was flying for another rescue scene over the Falls, was wrecked in a tree.

Immediately after completing her location work at Niagara, Bow boarded a train in Buffalo, New York to return to California. The Film Daily reports on November 13 that Bow had completed her work on The Adventurous Sex and was already traveling back to Hollywood to work on another production, Capital Punishment, for B. P. Schulberg. Several days later, other cast and crew from California began their cross-country returns as well, including Herbert Rawlinson, who arrived in Los Angeles by November 30.

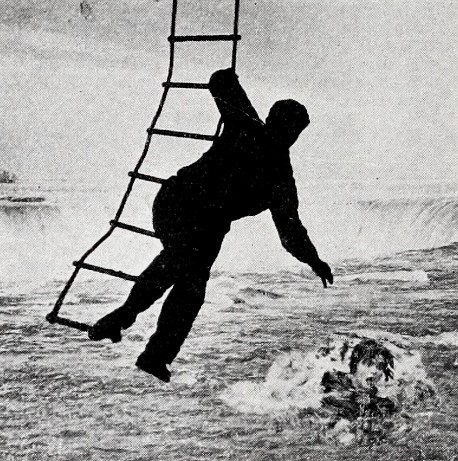
Frame featuring the animated silhouette of Rodney rescuing Patricia from a "watery grave".

In finalizing the theatrical footage and publicity stills of the rescue scenes shot at Niagara Falls, Estabrook's film editors employed special effects, using multiple exposures to add animated silhouettes of Rodney hanging on a rope ladder suspended from his airplane. Studio editors also superimposed images of Bow's face onto the water's surface near the falls' edge. In its pre-release promotion of the film in April 1925, the Exhibitors Trade Review highlights a frame from those "thrilling" scenes and describes it as "a fine example" of the film's "unusual photography". After the film's release, some reviewers did not find the effects used for the rescue scenes convincing. Robert Sisk of Variety, the entertainment industry's most widely read paper at the time, simply states in his June 17 review that the rescue's presentation is "Faked, but interesting".

== Release ==
Following Giblyn's completion of filming in New York, trade publications announced that The Adventurous Sex was already booked on theater schedules and set for general release on February 1, 1925. That date was later canceled, and the revised release was delayed for over four months. Such a protracted postponement in the film's distribution suggests that the film may have encountered post-production problems or, more likely, was temporarily shelved to allow Bow's other film at the time, Capital Punishment, to precede it. That film, according to Bow biographer David Stenn, "did more for Clara's career than her last half dozen movies put together."

Although The Adventurous Sex was officially released on June 12, 1925, the film was screened a month earlier in Jefferson City, Missouri. That preview, presented on May 11, was likely a test run to gauge audience reactions to the film and to assess the response of "Middle America" to its provocative title.

== Reception ==
The film in 1925 received generally mixed, lukewarm, or indifferent reviews from critics for leading newspapers and trade publications. Variety provides a straightforward review on June 17, largely recounting the film's plot with little commentary or critical insight. The popular paper does describe the picture as a "fair production" but one that "obviously skimped in parts". It also acknowledges that the six-reeler has a "good cast" and characterizes its footage of the rescue scene, as noted, as "interesting" but not credible. The trade paper notes too that the film was shown on June 12 as half of a double bill at Loew's Theatre in Manhattan, adding "'The Adventurous Sex' falls into the middle class of pictures and looks best suited for the daily changes." That added remark by Variety was a clear insult or dismissive slight, at least as interpreted in the motion picture industry, where "daily changes" was a "pejorative term for movies that played one day, then moved on to another theater in another town". Actually, the film "didn't last two days in New York", and it was not even reviewed by The New York Times.

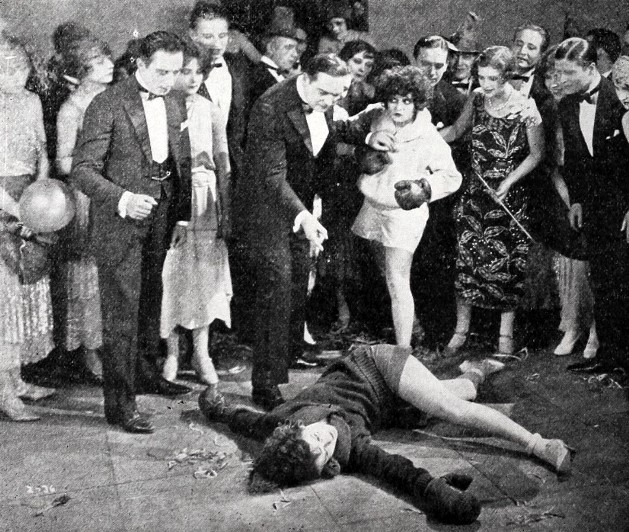
Scene with Patricia (Bow in white shorts) standing over a woman she defeated in a boxing match at a "wild" party

In its review of June 21, 1925, The Film Daily judges Giblyn's direction of the picture as mediocre and describes the climactic airplane stunt at Niagara Falls as farfetched but still a "thrill" to watch. Exhibitors Herald, a trade journal largely marketed to theater owners, simply describes the film as a "flapper story" in its review and summarizes its storyline with a good measure of detail. The journal also recommends a half dozen scenes for theaters to "highlight" in their promotion of the film, including "Boxing bout between two flappers" and "The rescue by aeroplane on the brink of the falls".

== "Lost" film status ==
Some additional promotional stills from the film can be found in 1924 and 1925 trade publications. Those images document at least the general content of some scenes in the photoplay. However, no full prints of The Adventurous Sex or any fragments of footage from its six reels are known to be preserved among the extensive holdings of the Library of Congress, the George Eastman Museum, the moving-images collection of the Museum of Modern Art, the UCLA Film and Television Archive, the Cinémathèque québécoise, the British Film Institute (BFI), or in any film repositories in the European Union. This motion picture is therefore "presumed lost".

== See also ==
- List of lost silent films (1925–1929)
