= 1942 New York Film Critics Circle Awards =

8th New York Film Critics Circle Awards

8th New York Film Critics Circle Awards

January ?, 1943
(announced December 26, 1942)

In Which We Serve

The 8th New York Film Critics Circle Awards, announced on 26 December 1942, honored the best filmmaking of 1942.

== Winners ==
- Best Film:
  - In Which We Serve
- Best Actor:
  - James Cagney - Yankee Doodle Dandy
- Best Actress:
  - Agnes Moorehead - The Magnificent Ambersons
- Best Director:
  - John Farrow - Wake Island
- Best War Fact Film:
  - Moscow Strikes Back
