= The Magnificent Ambersons (2002 film) =

- DVD cover
- Genre: Drama
- Based on: The Magnificent Ambersons by Orson Welles; The Magnificent Ambersons by Booth Tarkington
- Written by: Orson Welles
- Directed by: Alfonso Arau
- Starring: Madeleine Stowe; Bruce Greenwood; Jonathan Rhys Meyers; Gretchen Mol; Jennifer Tilly; Dina Merrill; James Cromwell
- Music by: Ruy Folguera
- Country of origin: United States
- Original language: English

Production
- Executive producers: Ted Hartley; Guido De Angelis; Delia Fine
- Producers: Gene Kirkwood; Norman Stephens; Jonas Bauer
- Cinematography: Kenneth MacMillan
- Editor: David Martin
- Running time: 150 minutes
- Production companies: A&E Networks; De Angelis Group; RKO Pictures; Victory Media Group

Original release
- Network: A&E
- Release: January 13, 2002

The Magnificent Ambersons is an A&E Network television film, inspired by Booth Tarkington's novel The Magnificent Ambersons. It was filmed using Orson Welles's screenplay and editing notes of the original film. Directed by Alfonso Arau, the film stars Madeleine Stowe, Bruce Greenwood, Jonathan Rhys Meyers, Gretchen Mol, Jennifer Tilly, Dina Merrill, and James Cromwell. This film does not strictly follow Welles's screenplay. It lacks several scenes included in the 1942 version, and contains essentially the same ending as Tarkington's novel.

== Cast ==
- Madeleine Stowe as Isabel Amberson Minafer
- Bruce Greenwood as Eugene Morgan
- Jonathan Rhys Meyers as George Amberson Minafer
- Gretchen Mol as Lucy Morgan
- Jennifer Tilly as Fanny Minafer
- William Hootkins as Uncle George
- Dina Merrill as Mrs. Johnson
- James Cromwell as Major Amberson
- Keith Allen as George - Age 9
- Jane Brennan as Nurse

== Reception ==
=== Critical response ===
Shortly after it was released, Variety characterized it as "one more sad step in the tragic film history of The Magnificent Ambersons." On review aggregator Rotten Tomatoes, it holds an audience approval rating of 30% based on 250+ reviews.
