= It Can Be Done (1921 film) =

1921 film

- Directed by: David Smith
- Story by: Frederick J. Jackson
- Starring: Earle Williams; Elinor Fair; Henry A. Barrows; Jack Mathis; Jack Carlyle
- Cinematography: Jack MacKenzie
- Production company: Earle Williams Productions
- Distributed by: Vitagraph Company of America
- Release date: March 1921
- Running time: 5 reels
- Country: United States
- Languages: Silent film (English intertitles)

It Can Be Done is a 1921 American silent comedy film directed by David Smith and starring Earle Williams, Elinor Fair, Henry A. Barrows, Jack Mathis, and Jack Carlyle. The film was released by Vitagraph Company of America in March 1921.

== Cast ==
- Earle Williams as Austin Crane
- Elinor Fair as Eve Standish
- Henry A. Barrows as Webb Standish (as Henry Barrows)
- Jack Mathis as Jasper Braden (as Jack Mathies)
- Jack Carlyle as Bill Donahue (as Jack Carlisle)
- Alfred Aldridge as Spike Dawson
- William McCall as Byron Tingley
- Florence Hart as Mrs. Standish
- Mary Huntress as Mrs. Faire

== Preservation ==
The film is now considered lost.
