= Kathryn Adams (actress, born 1893) =

American actress (1893-1959)

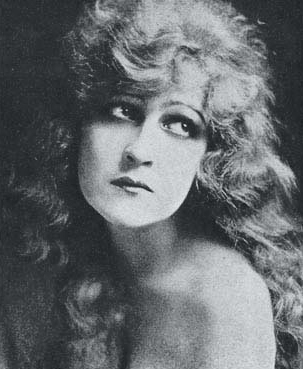
- Who's Who on the Screen, 1920
- Born: Ethalinda Colson; May 25, 1893; St. Louis, Missouri, US
- Died: February 17, 1959 (aged 65); Hollywood, Los Angeles, California, US
- Other name: Catherine Adams
- Occupation: Actress
- Spouse: Jacques Magnin

Kathryn Adams (born Ethalinda Colson; May 25, 1893 – February 17, 1959), sometimes credited as Catherine Adams or Katherine Adams, was an American actress. She began her career in 1911 working as a chorus girl in the Chicago production of Addison Burkhardt's hit musical Louisiana Lou which starred Sophie Tucker. She went to New York City to pursue training as a singer, and appeared in DeWolf Hopper's musical Hop o' My Thumb in the 1913-1914 season. She began her silent film career in 1915 working for Tom Terriss on The Pursuing Shadow, and that same year became a leading lady with first Metro Pictures and then the Thanhouser Company. She made numerous films with Thanhouser between 1915-1917, and worked with a variety of film companies thereafter. She became a supporting actress in the 1920s, and her silent film career ended in 1925. She made one sound film, making a minor uncredited appearance in the film The Squaw Man (1931).

== Early years ==
Adams was born Ethalinda Colson on May 25, 1893 , the daughter of actress Kate Colson. She attended schools in St. Louis, and also studied drama in that city at the Belmont School of Acting on Olive St. She later had vocal training in New York.

== Career ==
Adams initially worked as a stage actress. She began her career performing in the ensemble of Louisiana Lou, a musical by Addison Burkhardt which opened at the La Salle Theater in Chicago in September 1911 and starred Sophie Tucker and Alexander Carr. It was tremendously successful and had what was then a record-breaking-long run at that theater in the 1911-1912 season. She next joined the company of Hop o' My Thumb, a musical extravaganza by DeWolf Hopper which played at the Manhattan Opera House in December 1913 and January 1914 before going on tour.

In 1915, Adams began her film career with Tom Terriss's film company with her first movie being The Pursuing Shadow (1915). After this she made a couple films for Metro Pictures, including The Shooting of Dan McGrew (1915), before becoming a leading actress with the Thanhouser Company based in New Rochelle, New York. She had the lead roles in that company's productions The Bird of Prey (1916) and The Phantom Witness (1916). By 1917 she had left Thanhouser and come under contract with Goldwyn Pictures with whom she portrayed Aggie in the film Baby Mine (1917). Some of her notable films included The Vicar of Wakefield (1917), The Valentine Girl (1917), The Streets of Illusion (1917), Raffles The Amateur Cracksman (1917), Riders of the Purple Sage (1918), Restless Souls (1919), A Rogue's Romance (1919), Uncharted Channels (1920), The Forbidden Woman (1920), The Best of Luck (1920), Big Happiness (1920), and The Man from Downing Street (1922).

After working as a leading actress into the early 1920s, her career shifted into supporting roles; including the parts of Edith Langwell in Borrowed Husbands and Fanny Minafer in Pampered Youth. The latter part was her final silent film role, and except for a brief appearance in the 1931 version of The Squaw Man, she no longer made pictures after 1925.

== Personal life and death ==
After retiring from the film industry, Adams worked as an assembler at Lockheed Corporation making aircraft. She married Arthur Witter in 1920; in 1928, the two divorced due to Witter's drinking. She later married Jacques Magnin, a businessman from Los Angeles.

On February 17, 1959, Adams died in Hollywood Presbyterian Hospital of an intestinal hemorrhage at the age of 65. She is buried in section R of Calvary Cemetery, East Los Angeles next to her mother.

== Filmography ==
- The Pursuing Shadow (1915)
- The Shooting of Dan McGrew (1915)
- After Dark (1915)
- Helene of the North (1915)
- The Long Arm of the Secret Service (1915)
- In Baby's Garden (1915)
- Her Confession (1915)
- An Innocent Traitor (1915)
- Bubbles in the Glass (1916)
- The Phantom Witness (1916)
- A Bird of Prey (1916)
- The Spirit of the Game (1916)
- The Romance of the Hollow Tree (1916)
- For Uncle Sam's Navy (1916)
- Other People's Money (1916)
- The Shine Girl (1916)
- Divorce and the Daughter (1916)
- The Vicar of Wakefield (1917)
- Pots-and-Pans Peggy (1917)
- The Woman and the Beast (1917)
- The Valentine Girl (1917)
- Hinton's Double (1917)
- The Streets of Illusion (1917)
- The Customary Two Weeks (1917)
- Baby Mine (1917, credited as Katherine Adams)
- Raffles The Amateur Cracksman (1917)
- True Blue (1918)
- Riders of the Purple Sage (1918)
- Restless Souls (1919)
- A Gentleman of Quality (1919)
- The Silver Girl (1919)
- Whom the Gods Would Destroy (1919)
- A Rogue's Romance (1919, credited as Katherine Adams)
- Cowardice Court (1919)
- A Little Brother of the Rich (1919)
- The Brute Breaker (1919)
- Uncharted Channels (1920)
- The Forbidden Woman (1920)
- The Best of Luck (1920)
- Big Happiness (1920)
- 813 (1920)
- The Silver Car (1921)
- The Man from Downing Street (1922)
- Borrowed Husbands (1924)
- Pampered Youth (1925)
- The Squaw Man (Uncredited, 1931)
