= The Magnificent Ambersons (film) =

1942 film by Orson Welles

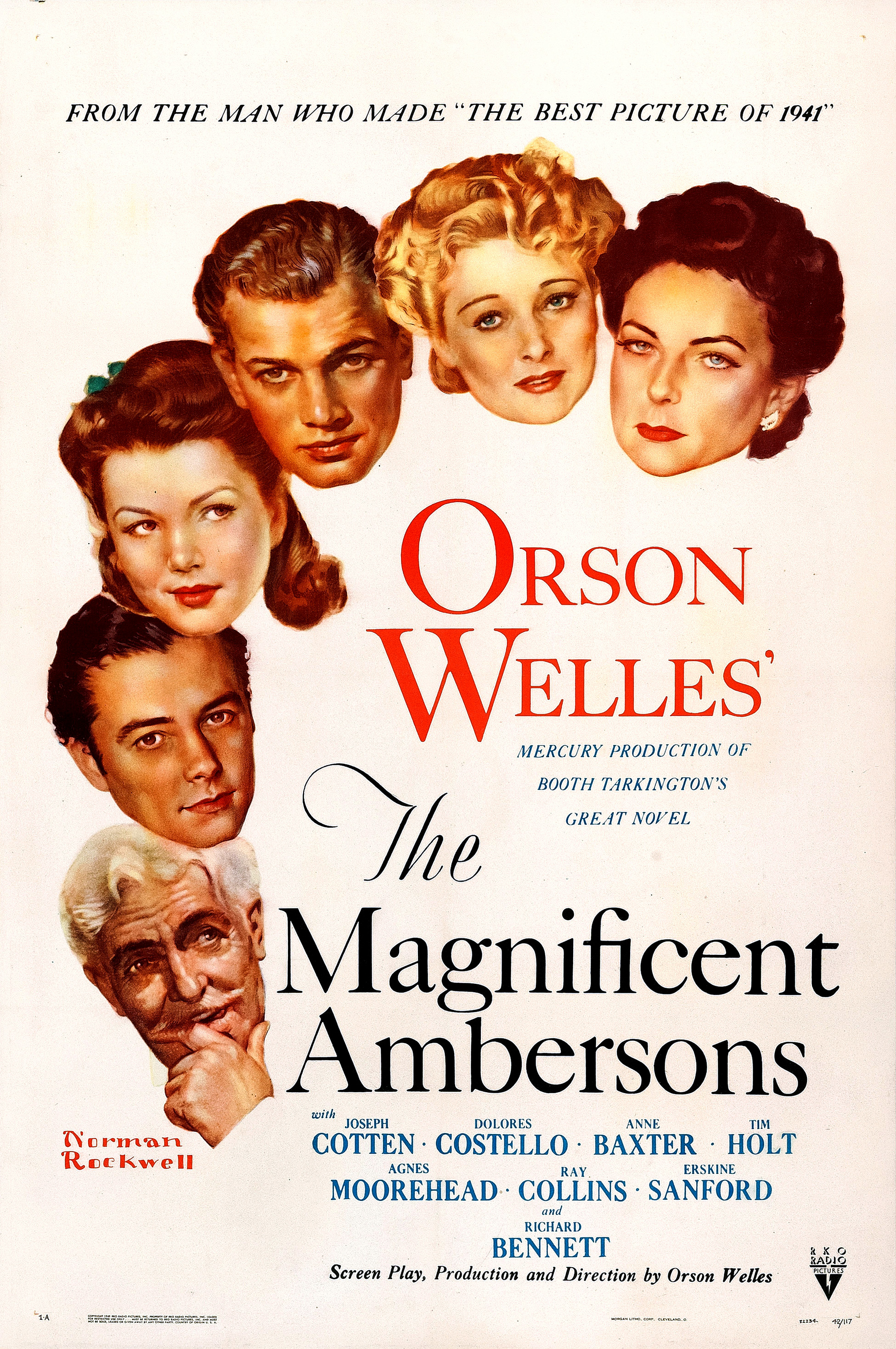
- Theatrical release poster by Norman Rockwell
- Directed by: Orson Welles
- Screenplay by: Orson Welles
- Based on: The Magnificent Ambersons; 1918 novel by Booth Tarkington
- Produced by: Orson Welles
- Starring: Joseph Cotten; Dolores Costello; Anne Baxter; Tim Holt; Agnes Moorehead; Ray Collins; Erskine Sanford; Richard Bennett
- Cinematography: Stanley Cortez; Orson Welles (Note: Uncredited); Jack MacKenzie (Note: Uncredited)
- Edited by: Robert Wise; Jack Moss (Note: Uncredited)
- Music by: Bernard Herrmann (Note: Uncredited)
- Production companies: RKO Radio Pictures; Mercury Productions
- Distributed by: RKO Radio Pictures
- Release date: July 10, 1942
- Running time: 88 minutes 131 minutes (original cut)
- Country: United States
- Language: English
- Budget: $1.1 million
- Box office: $1 million (US rentals); 210,966 admissions (France, 1946)

The Magnificent Ambersons is a 1942 American period drama written, produced, and directed by Orson Welles. Welles adapted Booth Tarkington's Pulitzer Prize–winning 1918 novel about the declining fortunes of a wealthy Midwestern family and the social changes brought by the automobile age. The film stars Joseph Cotten, Dolores Costello, Anne Baxter, Tim Holt, Agnes Moorehead, and Ray Collins, with Welles providing the narration.

Welles lost control of the editing of The Magnificent Ambersons to RKO, and the final version released to audiences differed significantly from his rough cut of the film. The studio cut more than an hour of footage and then shot and substituted a happier ending. Although Welles's extensive notes for how he wished the film to be cut have survived, the excised footage was destroyed. Composer Bernard Herrmann insisted his credit be removed when, like the film itself, his score was heavily edited by the studio.

Even in the released version, The Magnificent Ambersons is often regarded as among the greatest films of all time, a distinction it shares with Welles's first film, Citizen Kane. The film was nominated for four Academy Awards, including Best Picture, and was selected for preservation in the National Film Registry of the Library of Congress in 1991.

== Plot ==
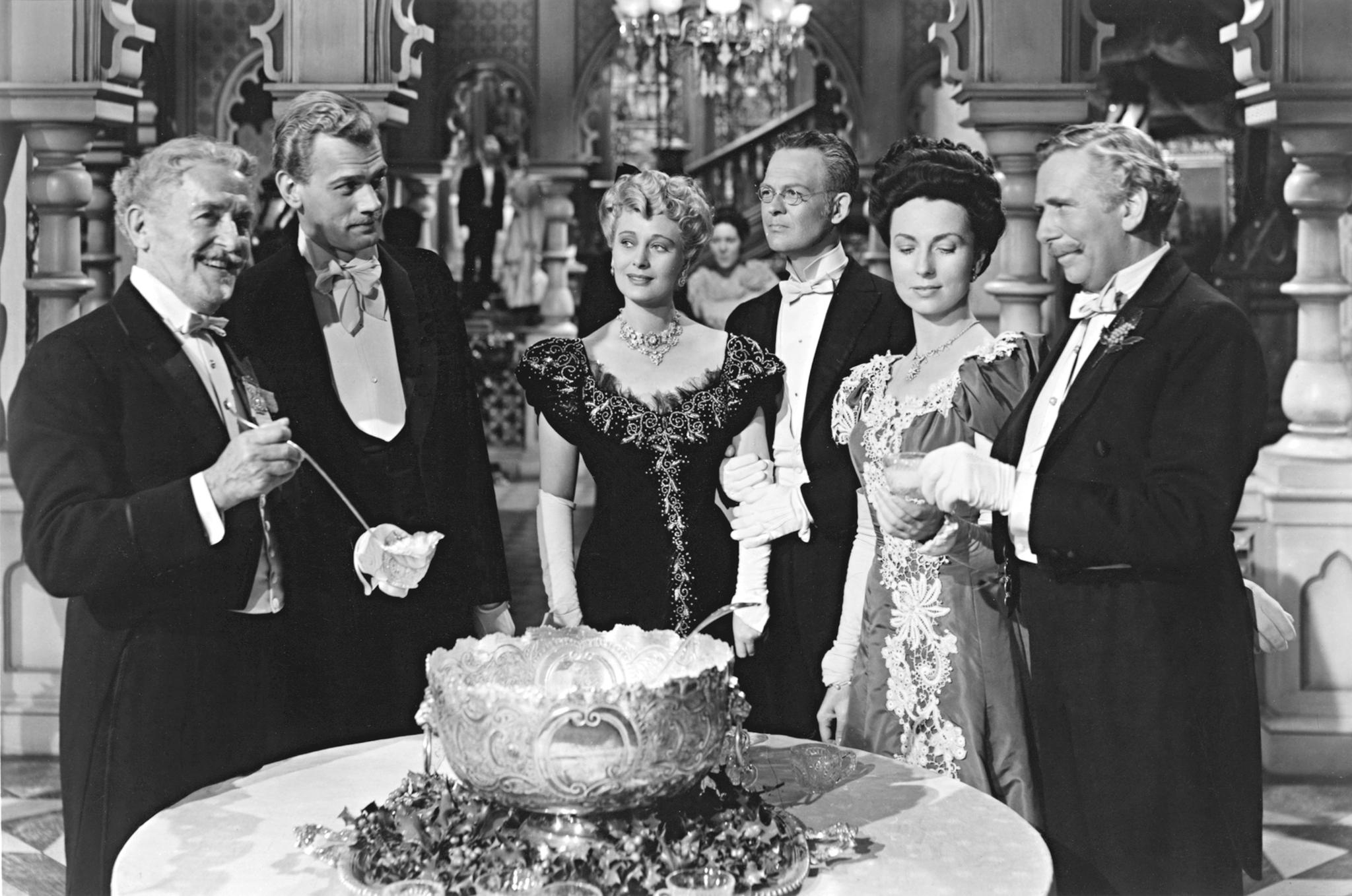
Richard Bennett, Joseph Cotten, Dolores Costello, Don Dillaway, Agnes Moorehead, and Ray Collins

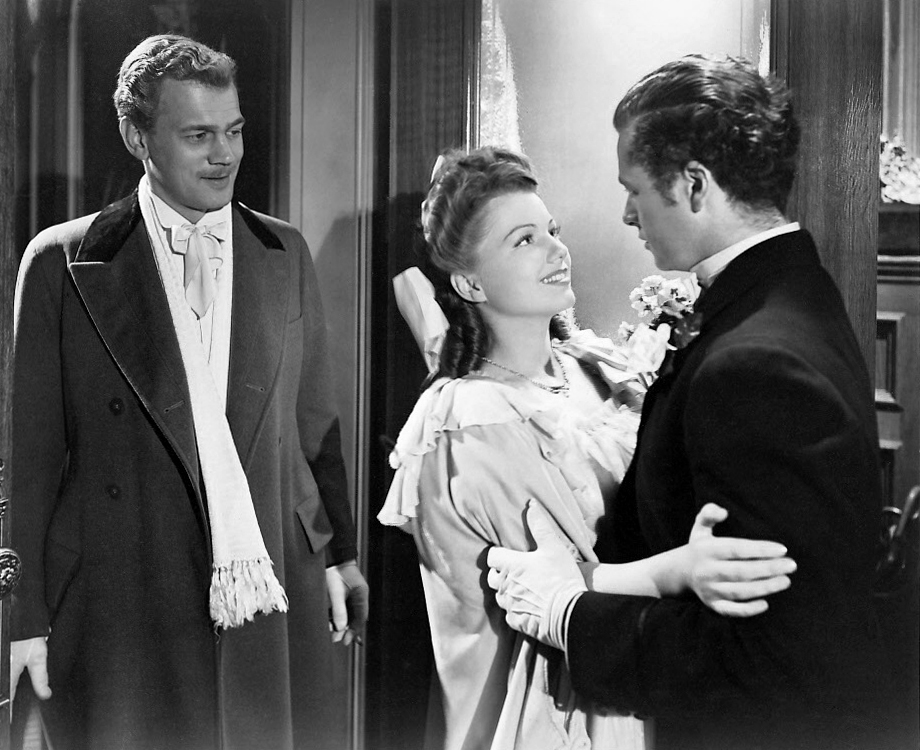
Joseph Cotten, Anne Baxter, and Tim Holt

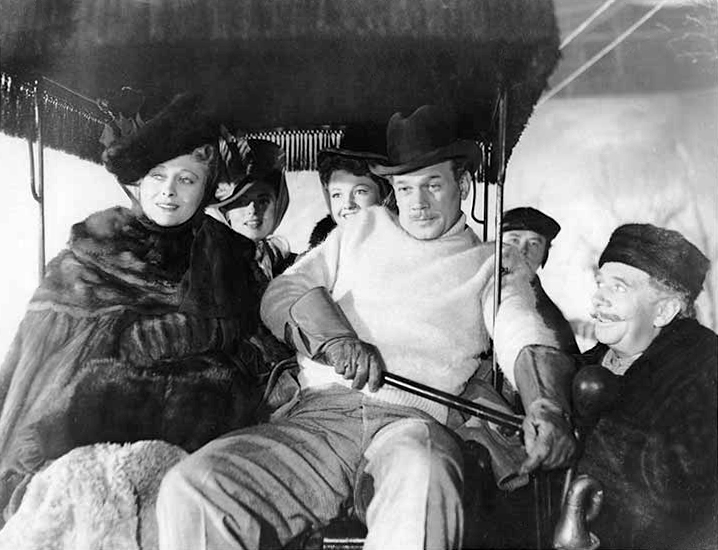
Dolores Costello, Agnes Moorehead, Anne Baxter, Joseph Cotten, Tim Holt, and Ray Collins

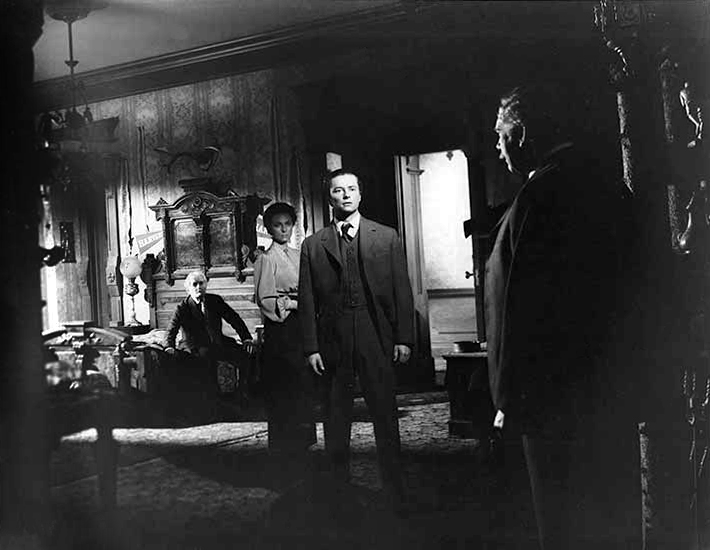
Richard Bennett, Agnes Moorehead, Tim Holt, and Ray Collins

The Magnificent Ambersons trailer

The Ambersons are by far the wealthiest family in their Midwestern city in the last few decades of the 19th century. As a young man Eugene Morgan courts Isabel Amberson, but she rejects him after he publicly embarrasses her. She instead marries Wilbur Minafer, a passionless man she does not love, and spoils their child George. The townspeople long to see George get his "comeuppance."

In the early 20th century Major Amberson gives a large party at the Amberson Mansion for George, who is home from college for the holidays. Eugene, now a widower who has just returned to town after 20 years, attends. George dislikes Eugene, whom he sees as a social climber, and ridicules Eugene's investment in the automobile. He instantly takes to Eugene's daughter Lucy.

The next day, George and Lucy take a sleigh ride. They pass Eugene, George's aunt Fanny, Isabel, and Isabel's brother Jack. Eugene's "horseless carriage" has gotten stuck in the snow, and George jeers at them to "get a horse." The Amberson sleigh then overturns, and Eugene, after his vehicle is mobile again, gives everyone a ride back home. George is humiliated by the incident and angered by Eugene's attention toward Isabel and his mother's obvious affection for Eugene.

Wilbur Minafer loses a substantial amount of money on bad investments and soon dies. George is largely unmoved by his father's death. The night after the funeral, George teases Fanny, who is besotted with Eugene.

Time passes, and Eugene becomes very wealthy manufacturing automobiles and again courts Isabel, who refuses to risk George's disapproval by telling him about their love. Lucy rejects George's marriage proposal by saying that he has no ambition in life other than to be wealthy and keep things as they are, and she leaves town. The Ambersons invite the lonely Eugene to dinner, where George, blaming him for turning Lucy against him, criticizes automobiles. The Ambersons are shocked by his rudeness, but Eugene says that George may turn out to be right.

That evening George learns from Aunt Fanny that Eugene has been courting Isabel. Enraged, he rudely confronts a neighbor for spreading gossip about his mother. The next day, George refuses to let Eugene see her. Jack tells Isabel about George's terrible behavior, but she declines to do anything that might upset her son. Eugene writes to Isabel and asks her to choose between her son and his love. Heartbroken due to her son's selfishness, Isabel nevertheless chooses George, thus destroying her chance for happiness.

Lucy returns home to find that George is taking his mother to Europe on an extended trip. George talks to Lucy in an attempt to discover if she loves him. She feigns indifference and they part. Lucy is heartbroken, however, and faints.

Months pass and Isabel is seriously ill, but George will not allow her to come home for fear that she will renew her relationship with Eugene. He relents only when she starts to die. George refuses to let Eugene go upstairs to visit Isabel on her deathbed, although she begs to see Eugene one last time.

After Isabel's death Major Amberson sinks into senility and dies. His estate is worthless. Jack leaves town to take a job in another city. George intends to live on Fanny's income while he trains to be a lawyer, but she reveals that she lost everything in bad investments, and they are left with only a few hundred dollars to live on for the rest of the year.

Eugene asks Lucy if she will reconcile with George. Lucy instead tells her father a story about an American Indian chief who was "pushed out on a canoe into the sea" when he became too obnoxious, which Eugene understands to be an analogy for George.

Penniless, George gives up his job as a law clerk and finds higher paying work in a chemical factory, which gives him enough money for himself and Fanny to live on. George wanders the city and is dazed by the modern factories and slums, which have grown up around him. In his last night in the Amberson mansion before it is sold, George prays by his dead mother's bed. The narrator says that no one is around to see him receive his comeuppance.

George is seriously injured by an automobile. Lucy and Eugene go to see him at the hospital and reconcile with him. In a hospital corridor Eugene tells Fanny that Isabel's spirit had inspired Eugene to bring George "under shelter again," which implies that his and Fanny's financial security was assured.

== Cast ==
- Joseph Cotten as Eugene Morgan
- Dolores Costello as Isabel Amberson Minafer
- Anne Baxter as Lucy Morgan
- Tim Holt as George Amberson Minafer
- Agnes Moorehead as Fanny Minafer, Wilbur's sister
- Ray Collins as Jack Amberson, Isabel's brother. Jack is a Congressman at the time of the ball.
- Erskine Sanford as Roger Bronson
- Richard Bennett as Major Amberson, father of Jack and Isabel.
- Don Dillaway as Wilbur Minafer
- Orson Welles as narrator

== Production ==
=== Adaptation history ===
Welles first adapted The Magnificent Ambersons for a one-hour radio drama performed October 29, 1939, by his Mercury Players on The Campbell Playhouse, with Orson Welles portraying George Minafer, and providing narration. While Welles supplied narration to the film adaptation, Ray Collins was the only actor from the radio production to appear in the film.

=== Production history ===
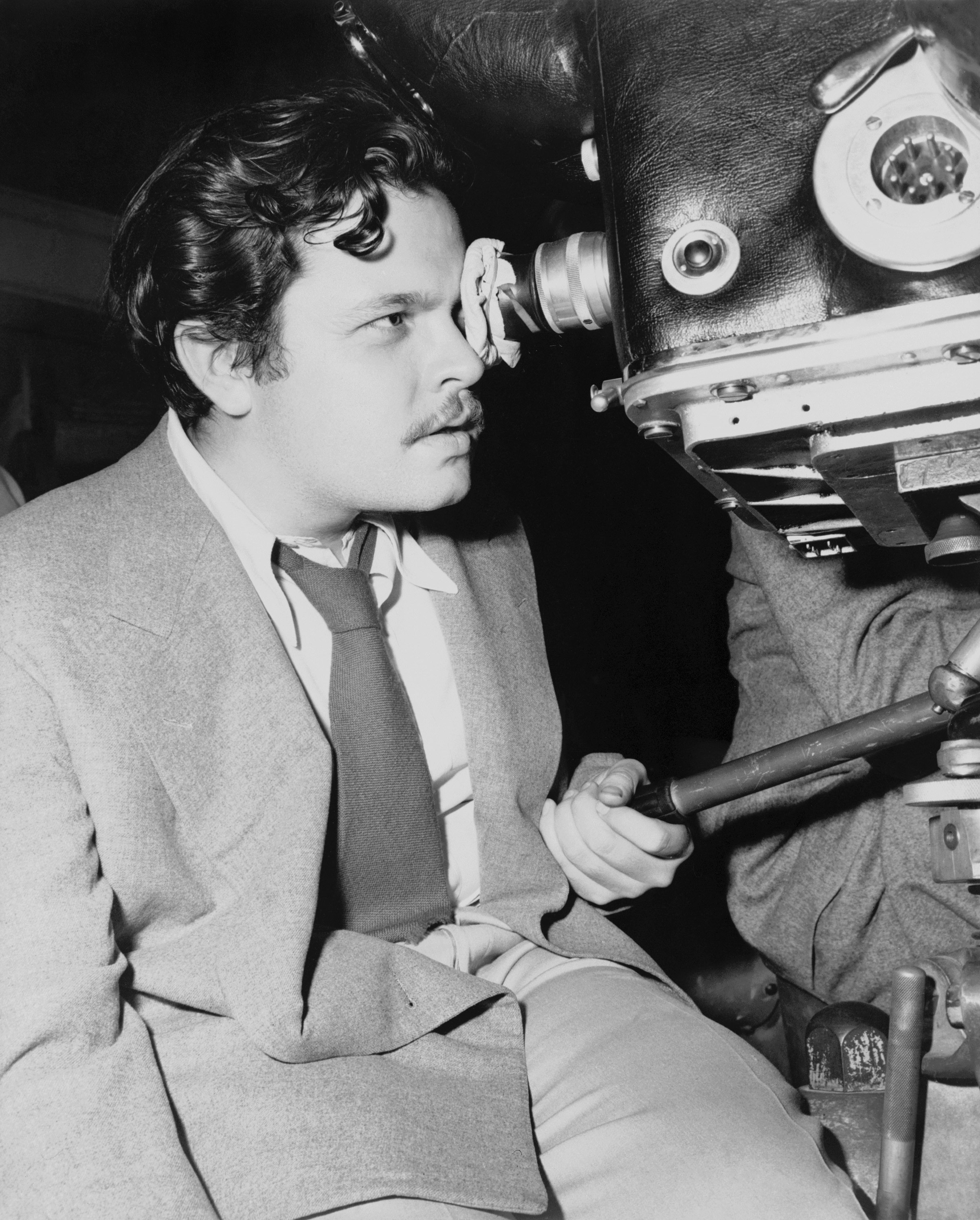
Orson Welles directing The Magnificent Ambersons

The Magnificent Ambersons was in production October 28, 1941 – January 22, 1942, at RKO's Gower Street studios in Los Angeles. The set for the Amberson mansion was constructed like a real house, but it had walls that could be rolled back, raised, or lowered to allow the camera to appear to pass through them in a continuous take. RKO later used many of the film's sets for its low-budget films, including a series of horror films produced by Val Lewton.

Location shooting took place at various places around the Los Angeles area, including Big Bear Lake, the San Bernardino National Forest, and East Los Angeles. Snow scenes were shot in the Union Ice Company ice house in downtown L.A. The film was budgeted at $853,950 but this went over during the shoot and ultimately exceeded $1 million.

In a 1973 interview with Dick Cavett, Moorehead recalled the arduous work involved before filming her climactic scene where she sinks against the unheated boiler. In rehearsal, Welles told Moorehead (who was still a novice to film acting) to "play it like a little girl," a characterization which went against what Moorehead had prepared. Then Welles told her to play "like an insane woman." Following that, Welles told her to play it "like she's absolutely inebriated." Then he said to play with "an absolutely vacuous mind." Moorehead was thinking to herself, "What in the world does he want?" She did the scene 11 times, each with a different characterization. For the twelfth time, Welles told Moorehead: "Now play it." After those rehearsals, her playing the scene had "a little bit of the hysteria, it had a little bit of the insanity, it had a little bit of the little girl…. [H]e had mixed it all up in my mind so that the characterization that I played had a little bit of all of these; and it was terribly exciting." Moorehead continued reflecting on Welles's directorial abilities: "He never directed obviously; he always directed in some strange oblique way where you thought 'Well, that isn't right at all.' But if you put your career or the role in his hands he loved to mold you the way he wanted and it was always much better than you could do yourself. He was the most exciting director that you could possibly imagine."

The original rough cut of the film was 131 minutes in length. Welles felt that the film needed to be shortened and, after receiving a mixed response from a March 17 preview audience in Pomona, film editor Robert Wise removed several minutes from it. The film was previewed again, but the audience's response did not improve.

Because Welles had conceded his original contractual right to the final cut (in a negotiation with RKO over a film which he was obliged to direct but never did), RKO took over editing once Welles had delivered a first cut. RKO deleted more than 40 additional minutes and reshot the ending in late April and early May, in changes directed by assistant director Fred Fleck, Robert Wise, and Jack Moss, the business manager of Welles's Mercury Theatre. The retakes replaced Welles's original ending with a happier one that broke significantly with the film's elegiac tone. The reshot ending is the same as in the novel.

Welles did not approve of the cuts, but because he was simultaneously working in Brazil on It's All True for RKO—Nelson Rockefeller had personally asked him to make a film in Latin America as part of the wartime Good Neighbor policy—his attempts to protect his version ultimately failed. Details of Welles's conflict over the editing are included in the 1993 documentary about It's All True.

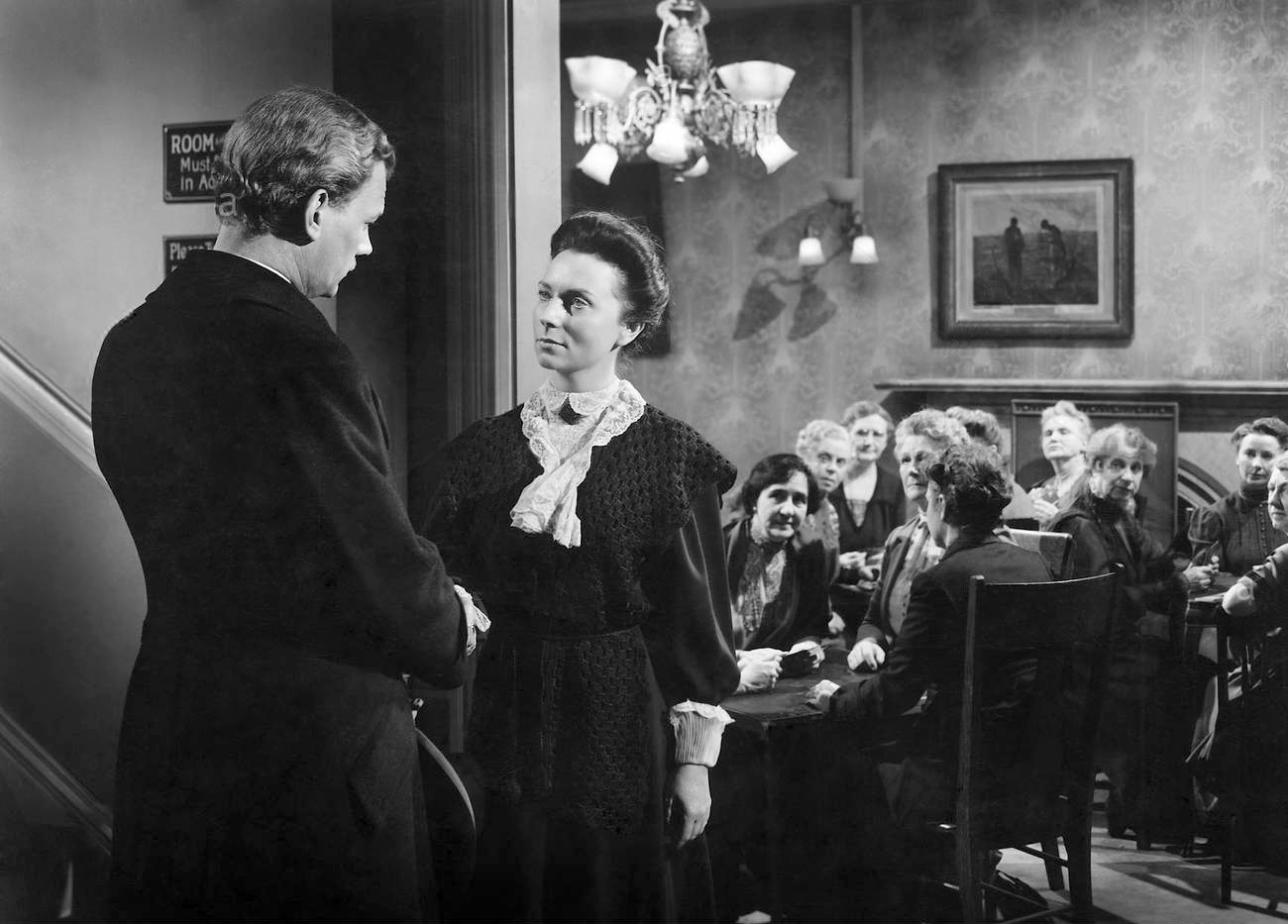
Promotional photograph showing the boardinghouse scene excised from The Magnificent Ambersons

"Of course I expected that there would be an uproar about a picture which, by any ordinary American standards, was much darker than anybody was making pictures," Welles told biographer Barbara Leaming:

There was just a built-in dread of the downbeat movie, and I knew I'd have that to face, but I thought I had a movie so good—I was absolutely certain of its value, much more than of Kane… It's a tremendous preparation for the boardinghouse… and the terrible walk of George Minafer when he gets his comeuppance. And without that, there wasn't any plot. It's all about some rich people fighting in their house.

Welles said he would not have gone to South America without the studio's guarantee that he could finish editing The Magnificent Ambersons there. "And they absolutely betrayed me and never gave me a shot at it. You know, all I could do was send wires… But I couldn't walk out on a job which had diplomatic overtones. I was representing America in Brazil, you see. I was a prisoner of the Good Neighbor Policy. That's what made it such a nightmare. I couldn't walk out on Mr. Roosevelt's Good Neighbor policy with the biggest single thing that they'd done on the cultural level, and simply walk away. And I couldn't get my film in my hands."

The negatives for the excised portions of The Magnificent Ambersons were later destroyed in order to free vault space. A print of the rough cut sent to Welles in Brazil has yet to be found and is generally considered to be lost, along with the prints from the previews. A documentary team led by Joshua Grossberg and backed by Turner Classic Movies planned a search for the rough cut in September 2021. Due to the COVID-19 pandemic, their arrival in Brazil was postponed until 2022. As of April 2024, Grossberg continued to search for the film. Filmmaker Brian Rose revealed in January 2021 he hoped to restore the original version of the film by use of animation, but his plan did not have the backing of the rights holder.

In the 2020s, Edward Saatchi, through his studio Fable, initiated an experimental project to reconstruct the approximately forty-three minutes of The Magnificent Ambersons that were cut and destroyed by RKO in 1942, using artificial intelligence trained on surviving scripts, production materials and the existing film. The project, intended as a noncommercial, academic exercise, aims to approximate Orson Welles’s original vision, though it has raised legal and ethical questions regarding authorship and creative restoration.

The film features what could be considered an in-joke: news of the increase in automobile accidents is featured prominently on the front page of the Indianapolis Daily Inquirer, part of the fictional chain of newspapers owned by mogul Charles Foster Kane in Citizen Kane. Also appearing on the front page is the column "Stage News", by the fictional writer Jed Leland, with a photo of Joseph Cotten, who portrayed Leland in the earlier film.

=== Budget ===
The budget for The Magnificent Ambersons was set at $853,950, roughly the final cost of Citizen Kane. During shooting the film went over budget by 19 percent ($159,810), bringing the cost of the Welles cut to $1,013,760. RKO's subsequent changes cost $104,164. The total cost of the motion picture was $1,117,924.

=== Score ===
Like the film itself, Bernard Herrmann's score for The Magnificent Ambersons was heavily edited by RKO. When more than half of his score was removed from the soundtrack, Herrmann bitterly severed his ties with the film and promised legal action if his name was not removed from the credits.

=== Spoken credits ===
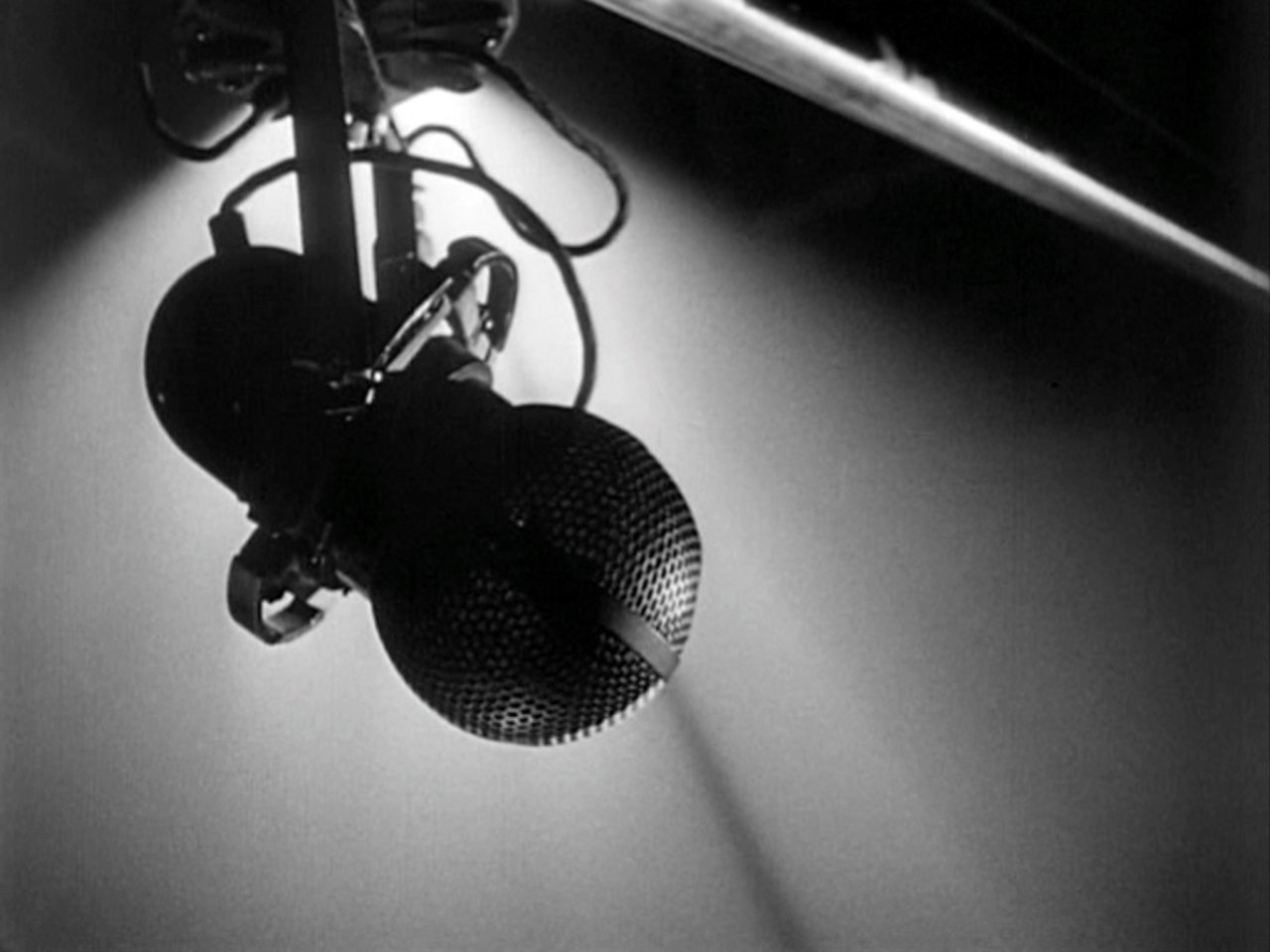
"I wrote the script and directed it. My name is Orson Welles. This is a Mercury Production."

The Magnificent Ambersons is one of the earliest films in movie history in which nearly all the credits are spoken by an off-screen voice and not shown printed onscreen (a technique used before only by the French director and player Sacha Guitry for his 1936 film Confessions of a Cheat). The only credits shown onscreen are the RKO logo, "A Mercury Production by Orson Welles", and the film's title, shown at the beginning of the picture. At the end of the film, Welles's voice announces all the main credits. Each actor in the film is shown as Welles announces his or her name. As he speaks each technical credit, a machine is shown performing that function. Welles reads his own credit — "My name is Orson Welles" — over top of an image of a microphone which then recedes into the distance.

"I got a lot of hell because of that," Welles later said of his verbal sign-off. "People think it's egotistic. The truth is, I was just speaking to a public who knew me from the radio in a way they were used to hearing on our shows. In those days we had an enormous public — in the millions — who heard us every week, so it didn't seem pompous to end a movie in our radio style."

=== Welles's 1970s revisit ===
In conversations (1969–75) with Peter Bogdanovich compiled in This Is Orson Welles, Welles confirmed that he had planned to reshoot the ending of The Magnificent Ambersons with the principal cast members who were still living:

Yes, I had an outside chance to finish it again just a couple of years ago, but I couldn't swing it. The fellow who was going to buy the film for me disappeared from view. The idea was to take the actors who are still alive now—Cotten, Baxter, Moorehead, Holt—and do quite a new end to the movie, twenty years after. Maybe that way we could have got a new release and a large audience to see it for the first time. You see, the basic intention was to portray a golden world—almost one of memory—and then show what it turns into. Having set up this dream town of the "good old days," the whole point was to show the automobile wrecking it—not only the family but the town. All this is out. What's left is only the first six reels. Then there's a kind of arbitrary bringing back down the curtain by a series of clumsy, quick devices. The bad, black world was supposed to be too much for people. My whole third act is lost because of all the hysterical tinkering that went on. And it was hysterical. Everybody they could find was cutting it.

== Release ==
By January 1943, the film managed to earn $1 million in box office rentals in North America. However, it was not enough to recoup the film's cost and it recorded a loss of $620,000.

=== Contemporary reception ===
Thomas M. Pryor of The New York Times praised The Magnificent Ambersons as "an exceptionally well-made film, dealing with a subject scarcely worth the attention which has been lavished upon it." He further praised the performances from the cast highlighting Dolores Costello as being "too beautiful and capable an actress to remain inactive for such long periods. Agnes Moorehead, playing the role of a romantically frustrated aunt, is splendid. Other fine performances are contributed by Ray Collins, Anne Baxter and the veteran Richard Bennett as the grandfather." Time heralded the film as "a great motion picture, adult and demanding. Artistically, it is a textbook of advanced cinema technique. The novel use of sidelighting and exaggerated perspective that made Kane seem unlike any other movie floods Ambersons with the same revealing eloquence, examining faces, bathrooms, streets, the cluttered detail of the Ambersons' magnificence, from a viewpoint so fresh that it creates a visual suspense in the very act of clarification." Harrison's Reports positively wrote the film "is an artistic achievement, excelling in every department—that of direction, acting, production, and photography."

Herm Schoenfeld of Variety unfavorably compared the film to The Little Foxes (1941), writing that it is "without the same dynamic power of story, acting, and social preachment. Also unlike 'Foxes,' this film hasn't a single moment of contrast; it piles on and on a tale of woe, but without once striking at least a true chord of sentimentality." Mae Tinée of the Chicago Tribune wrote "All the acting is commendable, but somehow for me, the characters seldom 'came alive.' ... And I guess I wasn't alone in that action, because people sitting near me exhibited a baffled restlessness." Manny Farber, reviewing for The New Republic, criticized Welles's radio-style approach writing: "...at the times when something is on the screen and Welles tells you what for. Meanwhile, for something to do, you count the shadows. Theater-like is the inability to get the actors or story moving, which gives you a desire to push with your hands. There is really no living, moving or seeing to the movie; it is a series of static episodes connected by narration, as though someone sat you down and said "Here!" and gave you some postcards of the 1890s."

=== Retrospective reviews ===
On Rotten Tomatoes, The Magnificent Ambersons has an 89% approval rating based on 46 reviews, with an average rating of 8.9/10. On Metacritic, the film has a score of 93 out of 100 based on 17 critic reviews, indicating "universal acclaim".

In the Los Angeles Times, Kevin Thomas argued, "Although reams have been written about the mutilation of Orson Welles's second feature, what remains of it is nevertheless a major accomplishment". Jonathan Rosenbaum of the Chicago Reader called its mise-en-scène "extraordinary" and wrote that the film contains some of the finest acting in American cinema.

In 1991, The Magnificent Ambersons was selected for preservation in the United States National Film Registry by the Library of Congress as being "culturally, historically, or aesthetically significant". In 1998 Time Out conducted a poll and the film was voted the 62nd greatest film of all time. The film was included in Sight and Sound's 1972 list of the top 10 greatest films ever made, and again in the 1982 list. In 2000, the film was ranked at 25th place in The Village Voice's 100 Greatest Films list, The Magnificent Ambersons placed 81st in the 2012 Sight & Sound critics' poll of the greatest films ever made; it also received four directors' votes, one of which was that of Terence Davies. In 2015, the film ranked 11th on the BBC's "100 Greatest American Films" list, voted on by film critics from around the world. The February 2020 issue of New York Magazine lists The Magnificent Ambersons as among "The Best Movies That Lost Best Picture at the Oscars." In the 2022 Sight and Sound critic's poll, the film was ranked at 169th place.

=== Awards and nominations ===
Award	Category	Nominees	Result
Academy Awards	Best Picture	Mercury	Nominated
Academy Awards	Best Actress in a Supporting Role	Agnes Moorehead	Nominated
Academy Awards	Best Black-and-White Cinematography	Stanley Cortez	Nominated
Academy Awards	Best Black-and-White Art Direction-Interior Decoration	Albert S. D'Agostino, A. Roland Fields and Darrell Silvera	Nominated
National Board of Review Awards	Best Actor	Tim Holt	Won
National Board of Review Awards	Best Actress	Agnes Moorehead	Won
New York Film Critics Circle Awards	Best Actress	Agnes Moorehead	Won

== Home media ==
- 1985: RKO Home Video, VHS (2073), 1985
- 1986: The Voyager Company (The Criterion Collection), Laserdisc, 1986—audio commentary by Robert Carringer
- 1989: Turner Home Entertainment, VHS, December 27, 1989, colorized version
- 2011: Warner Home Video, Region 1 DVD, September 13, 2011 (Amazon.com exclusive); January 31, 2012 (general release)
- 2018: The Criterion Collection, Region A Blu-ray / Region 1 DVD, November 20, 2018

== Film memorabilia ==
In an auction of April 26, 2014, a script of The Magnificent Ambersons was sold for $10,625 and a collection of approximately 275 stills and production photos sold for $2,750. The materials were among those found in boxes and trunks of Welles's personal possessions by his daughter Beatrice Welles.

== Soundtrack releases ==
A CD of the soundtrack to this film was released in 1990 in the US. The pieces were entirely re-recorded.

All pieces were composed by Bernard Herrmann, and were re-recorded by the Australian Philharmonic Orchestra, conducted by Tony Bremner.

== 2002 remake ==
In 2002, The Magnificent Ambersons was made as an A&E Network original film for television, using the Welles screenplay and his editing notes. Directed by Alfonso Arau, the film stars Madeleine Stowe, Bruce Greenwood, Jonathan Rhys Meyers, Gretchen Mol, and Jennifer Tilly. This film does not strictly follow Welles's screenplay; it omits several scenes included in the 1942 version and has essentially the same happy ending.

== See also ==
- List of films cut over the director's opposition
- List of incomplete or partially lost films
