= List of Chesterfield Pictures films =

This is a list of films released by the American studio Chesterfield Pictures between its founding in 1925 and 1937 when it was absorbed into the larger Republic Pictures. The studio was a Poverty Row producer, distributing mainly low-budget second features. In 1932, it merged with another company Invincible Pictures, and distributed films put out under that name. In total Chesterfield handled more than a hundred films during its twelve-year existence.

== 1920s ==
Title	Release date	Director
A Jungle Heroine	April 1925	Bertram Bracken
The Were-Tiger	May 1925	Paul Hurst
The Last Man	June 1925	Bertram Bracken
The Lion's Mate	July 1925	Bertram Bracken
A Jungle Tragedy	August 1925	Bertram Bracken
Beasts of the Veldt	September 1925	Bertram Bracken
The Sagebrush Lady	October 1, 1925	Horace B. Carpenter
Flashing Steeds	November 1, 1925	Horace B. Carpenter
The Girl of the West	December 1, 1925	Alan James
Fangs of Fate	December 9, 1925	Horace B. Carpenter
Lucky Spurs	1926	Horace B. Carpenter
A String of Diamonds	March 1, 1926	Frank S. Mattison
The Love Fighter	May 1, 1926	Lou Carter
Western Trails	May 15, 1926	Horace B. Carpenter
The Wolf	June 1, 1926	Lou Carter
Beyond All Odds	June 15, 1926	Alan James
Detective K-9	July 1, 1926	William Bertram
The Last Chance	July 15, 1926	Horace B. Carpenter
Code of the Northwest	July 25, 1926	Frank S. Mattison
Dumb Romeo	August 1, 1926	Frank S. Mattison
Thundering Speed	August 15, 1926	Alan James
Fangs of Vengeance	September 1, 1926	William Bertram
Beyond the Trail	September 1926	Albert Herman
The Silent Trailer	October 1, 1926	Francis Ford
Dog Scents	November 1, 1926	Francis Ford
Lure of the West	November 1926	Alan James
Dog of Dogs	December 1, 1926	Ernest Van Pelt
The Call of the Wilderness	December 5, 1926	Jack Nelson
Doc's Dog	January 1, 1927	Ernest Van Pelt
Almost Human	March 1, 1927	Robin Williamson
The Thief Trapper	April 1, 1927	
The Sky Rider	June 5, 1927	Alan James
Avenging Fangs	June 15, 1928	Ernest Van Pelt
The Adorable Cheat	August 15, 1928	Burton L. King
The House of Shame	October 1, 1928	Burton L. King
South of Panama	November 15, 1928	Charles J. Hunt
Below the Deadline	January 1, 1929	J.P. McGowan
Just Off Broadway	May 1, 1929	Frank O'Connor
The Peacock Fan	March 17, 1929	Phil Rosen
Campus Knights	March 1929	Albert H. Kelley
Circumstantial Evidence	April 1, 1929	Wilfred Noy
Silent Sentinel	May 15, 1929	Alan James
The House of Secrets	May 26, 1929	Edmund Lawrence
Love at First Sight	December 15, 1929	Edgar Lewis

== 1930s ==
Title	Release date	Director	Notes
Ladies in Love	May 15, 1930	Edgar Lewis	
The Jazz Cinderella	September 1, 1930	Scott Pembroke	
The Midnight Special	December 7, 1930	Duke Worne	
The Lawless Woman	May 5, 1931	Richard Thorpe	
The Lady from Nowhere	August 1, 1931	Richard Thorpe	
Grief Street	October 1, 1931	Richard Thorpe	
The Devil Plays	December 15, 1931	Richard Thorpe	
Second Chances	March 15, 1932	Richard Thorpe	
Dangerous Ground	April 1, 1932	Richard Thorpe	
The Midnight Lady	May 15, 1932	Richard Thorpe	
Forbidden Company	June 15, 1932	Richard Thorpe	
Beauty Parlor	June 15, 1932	Richard Thorpe	
Thrill of Youth	August 15, 1932	Richard Thorpe	
The King Murder	September 15, 1932	Richard Thorpe	
Slightly Married	October 15, 1932	Richard Thorpe	
Women Won't Tell	November 15, 1932	Richard Thorpe	
The Secrets of Wu Sin	December 15, 1932	Richard Thorpe	
Forgotten	February 15, 1933	Richard Thorpe	
Love Is Dangerous	March 15, 1933	Richard Thorpe	
I Have Lived	June 15, 1933	Richard Thorpe	
Strange People	June 17, 1933	Richard Thorpe	
By Appointment Only	July 7, 1933	Frank R. Strayer	
Notorious But Nice	August 5, 1933	Richard Thorpe	
Dance Girl Dance	September 1, 1933	Frank R. Strayer	
A Man of Sentiment	September 15, 1933	Richard Thorpe	
On the Stroke of Nine	October 30, 1933	Richard Thorpe	
In the Money	November 7, 1933	Frank R. Strayer	
Twin Husbands	November 30, 1933	Frank R. Strayer	
Rainbow Over Broadway	December 1, 1933	Richard Thorpe	
Cross Streets	January 22, 1934	Frank R. Strayer	
The Quitter	February 5, 1934	Richard Thorpe	
Stolen Sweets	March 15, 1934	Richard Thorpe	
City Park	May 1, 1934	Richard Thorpe	
In Love with Life	May 12, 1934	Frank R. Strayer	
Green Eyes	June 15, 1934	Richard Thorpe	
Fifteen Wives	July 15, 1934	Frank R. Strayer	
Fugitive Road	August 22, 1934	Frank R. Strayer	
The Curtain Falls	October 2, 1934	Charles Lamont	
Port of Lost Dreams	October 15, 1934	Frank R. Strayer	
The World Accuses	November 12, 1934	Charles Lamont	
The Ghost Walks	December 1, 1934	Frank R. Strayer	
Sons of Steel	December 15, 1934	Charles Lamont	
Symphony of Living	January 20, 1935	Frank R. Strayer	
A Shot in the Dark	February 1, 1935	Charles Lamont	
Public Opinion	March 15, 1935	Frank R. Strayer	
One in a Million	March 21, 1935	Frank R. Strayer	
Circumstantial Evidence	March 30, 1935	Charles Lamont	
The Girl Who Came Back	June 21, 1935	Charles Lamont	
Society Fever	June 23, 1935	Frank R. Strayer	
Death from a Distance	July 3, 1935	Frank R. Strayer	
Happiness C.O.D.	September 10, 1935	Charles Lamont	
Condemned to Live	September 15, 1935	Frank R. Strayer	
The Lady in Scarlet	October 20, 1935	Charles Lamont	
False Pretenses	October 22, 1935	Charles Lamont	
Tango	February 14, 1936	Phil Rosen	
The Bridge of Sighs	February 15, 1936	Phil Rosen	
Ring Around the Moon	February 15, 1936	Charles Lamont	
The Dark Hour	February 18, 1936	Charles Lamont	
August Weekend	February 18, 1936	Charles Lamont	
Murder at Glen Athol	February 28, 1936	Frank R. Strayer	
The Little Red Schoolhouse	March 2, 1936	Charles Lamont	
Footlights and Shadows	March 12, 1936	Frank R. Strayer	
Brilliant Marriage	March 25, 1936	Phil Rosen	
Three of a Kind	May 20, 1936	Phil Rosen	
Below the Deadline	June 8, 1936	Charles Lamont	
Easy Money	June 14, 1936	Phil Rosen	
It Couldn't Have Happened (But It Did)	August 1, 1936	Phil Rosen	
Missing Girls	September 10, 1936	Phil Rosen	
Lady Luck	September 14, 1936	Charles Lamont	
House of Secrets	October 28, 1936	Roland D. Reed	
Ellis Island	November 5, 1936	Phil Rosen	
Red Lights Ahead	November 29, 1936	Roland D. Reed	

== Bibliography ==
- Michael R. Pitts. Poverty Row Studios, 1929-1940: An Illustrated History of 55 Independent Film Companies, with a Filmography for Each. McFarland & Company, 2005.
