= Rudolph de Cordova =

Jamaican-British writer and actor (1860–1941)

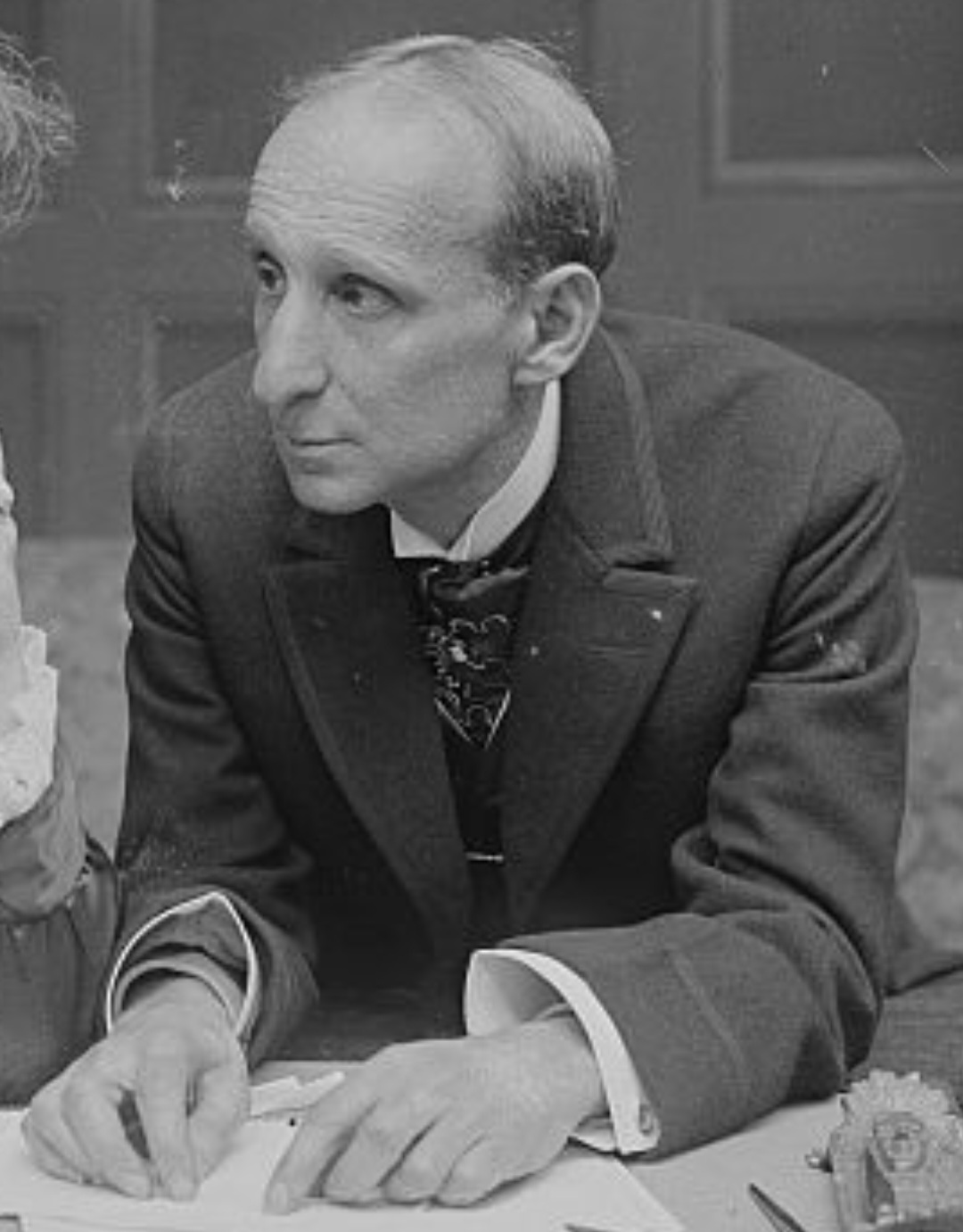
- Cordova in 1916
- Born: 10 June 1859; Kingston, Jamaica, British West Indies
- Died: 11 January 1941 (aged 81); Kensington, London, England, UK
- Occupations: Writer; screenwriter; actor
- Years active: 1917–1925
- Spouse: Alice Joanna Royston (m. 1916)
- Relatives: Leander de Cordova (brother); Jacob de Cordova (grand-uncle)

Rudolph de Cordova (10 June 1859 – 11 January 1941) was a Jamaican-born British writer, screenwriter and actor. Cordova was born in Kingston, the son of Altamont de Cordova, a prominent merchant, and Katherine Lewis. He went to London to study medicine in the 1880s, but soon abandoned his studies in order to become an actor. His brother was the actor and film director Leander de Cordova. He was also the grandnephew of Jacob de Cordova, and great grandnephew of Raphael de Cordova, a coffee brewer and president of the first synagogue in Philadelphia, Pennsylvania. He was also the cousin of Julian de Cordova, former president of Union Glass Company, and founder of the deCordova Sculpture Park and Museum.

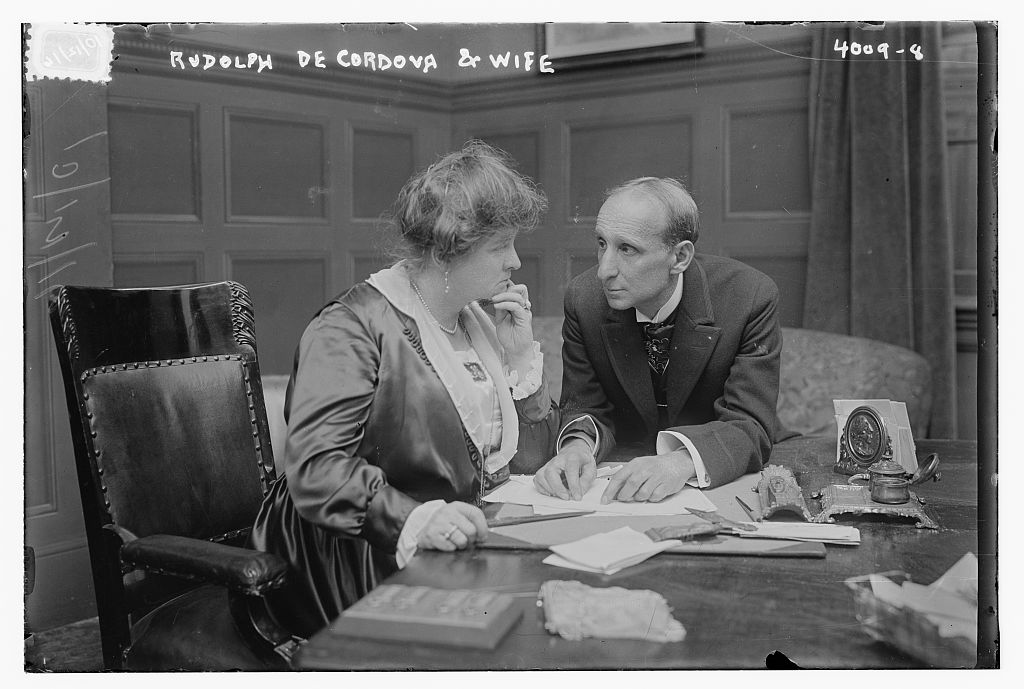
Rudolph de Cordova and Alicia Ramsey in 1916

He was married to the writer Alicia Ramsey and collaborated with her on several plays.

== Selected filmography ==
Actor

- The Greatest Power (1917)
- The Trail of the Shadow (1917)
- The Glorious Adventure (1922)
- The Secret Kingdom (1925)

Screenwriter

- Romeo and Juliet (1916)
- Trumpet Island (1920)

== Bibliography ==
- Hill, Errol. The Jamaican Stage, 1655–1900, Profile of a Colonial Theatre. University of Massachusetts Press, 1992.
