= Fangs of Fate =

Fangs of Fate may refer to:

- Fangs of Fate (1925 film), an American silent Western film
- Fangs of Fate (1928 film), an American silent action film
