= George Marion =

George Marion may refer to:

- George F. Marion (1860–1945), American actor and director of stage and screen
- George Marion Jr. (1899–1968), American screenwriter
