= False Fathers =

1929 film

- Directed by: Horace B. Carpenter
- Starring: Noah Beery; Horace B. Carpenter
- Cinematography: Harry Neumann
- Production company: El Dorado Productions
- Distributed by: Davis Distributing Division
- Release date: April 11, 1922
- Running time: 60 minutes
- Country: United States
- Language: Silent (English intertitles)

False Fathers is a 1929 American silent Western film directed by Horace B. Carpenter, starring Carpenter and Noah Beery.

== Plot ==
As described in a film review, two gold prospectors, after ending an Indian attack on a covered wagon with dynamite, are led by a dog to a baby as the sole survivor of the attack. One of the prospectors is wanted for a murder that he did not commit, and he dreams of life with the young woman who believes him innocent. The two prospectors comically take care of the baby the best they can (for much of the film), and they come to love the child. A lawman is waylaid by a storm, and the accused man saves the detective from a wildcat. The detective tells him that the real murderer has confessed, and that he was after a band of crooks who had kidnapped the baby. It turns out that the baby belongs to one of the prospectors, but the lawman takes the child away. A parson then informs them that by law the child must be returned to the father. The child is returned for the joyous ending.

== Cast ==
- Noah Beery as Parson
- Horace B. Carpenter
- Francis Pomerantz
- E. A. Martin

== Review ==
A review in Variety described the film as "rank hokum" and noted that Noah Beery appeared for only a few minutes as the Parson.

== Preservation ==
With no holdings located in archives, False Fathers is considered a lost film.

== Bibliography ==
- Connelly, Robert B. The Silents: Silent Feature Films, 1910-36, Volume 40, Issue 2. December Press, 1998.
- Munden, Kenneth White. The American Film Institute Catalog of Motion Pictures Produced in the United States, Part 1. University of California Press, 1997.
