= A Son of the Desert =

1928 film

- Directed by: Merrill McCormick
- Written by: Merrill McCormick
- Starring: Merrill McCormick; Marin Sais; Bob Burns
- Production company: F.W. Kraemer Productions
- Distributed by: American Releasing Corporation
- Release date: February 11, 1928
- Running time: 50 minutes
- Country: United States
- Languages: Silent; English intertitles

A Son of the Desert is a 1928 American silent drama film directed by Merrill McCormick and starring McCormick, Marin Sais and Bob Burns.

== Synopsis ==
Helen Dobson, an American art student travelling through the Arabian Peninsula arranges to paint the portrait of a sheikh but soon finds herself in trouble and is rescued by a Texas cowboy friend.

== Cast ==
- Merrill McCormick as Sheik Hammid Zayad
- Marin Sais as Helen Dobson
- Bob Burns as Steve Kinard
- Faith Hope as Zuebida
- Jim Welch as Colonel Dobson

== Bibliography ==
- Munden, Kenneth White. The American Film Institute Catalog of Motion Pictures Produced in the United States, Part 1. University of California Press, 1997.
