= Merrill McCormick =

American actor

- Born: February 5, 1892; Denver, Colorado, U.S.
- Died: August 19, 1953 (aged 61); San Gabriel, California, U.S.
- Resting place: California
- Occupation: Actor
- Years active: 1916-1953

William Merrill McCormick (February 5, 1892 – August 19, 1953) was an American film actor. He appeared in more than 250 films between 1916 and 1953.

== Biography ==
William Merrill McCormick was born on February 5, 1892, in Denver, Colorado.

McCormick appeared in films like The Last Chance (1926) as Black Bart, The Prisoner of Shark Island, Oh, Susanna!, Heroes of the Alamo as one of the Alamo's defenders, Stagecoach, Dodge City, Man of Conquest, Dick Tracy's G-Men, San Antonio, and Buffalo Bill in Tomahawk Territory. His television appearances included The Cisco Kid, The Adventures of Wild Bill Hickok, and The Gene Autry Show.

When McCormick made A Son of the Desert, he wrote the story and directed the film in addition to having the leading role.

McCormick died in San Gabriel, California from a heart attack.

== Selected filmography ==
- '49-'17 (1917) - Townsman (uncredited)
- Something New (1920) - Agrilla Gorgez - the Bandit
- Hands Off! (1921) - Tony Alviro
- Red Courage (1921) - Percy Gibbons
- Robin Hood (1922) - Henchman to Prince John
- Danger (1923) - Jose
- Good Men and Bad (1923) - Don Pedro Martinez
- The Dramatic Life of Abraham Lincoln (1924) - Corporal of Guard (as William McCormick)
- Pioneer's Gold (1924) - Pascale
- Range Blood (1924)
- Notch Number One (1924)
- Tonio, Son of the Sierras (1925) - Soldier
- Vic Dyson Pays (1925) - Albert Stacey
- Reckless Courage (1925) - Chuck Carson
- Flashing Steeds (1925) - Lord Algernon Rathburne
- Fangs of Fate (1925) - 'Red Mack' - the Renegade
- The Desperate Game (1926) - Luke Grayson
- The Last Chance (1926) - 'Black' Bart
- The Long Loop on the Pecos (1927)
- Whispering Smith Rides (1927)
- Arizona Nights (1927)
- A Son of the Desert (1928)
- The Apache Raider (1928)
- Romance of the Rio Grande (1929)
- Battling with Buffalo Bill (1931)
- Trails of the Golden West (1931)
- South of the Rio Grande (1932)
- Two-Fisted Law (1932)
- The Boiling Point (1932)
- The Three Musketeers (1933)
- Fog (1933)
- The Law of the Wild (1934)
- The New Adventures of Tarzan (1935)
- Winds of the Wasteland (1936)
- Rebellion (1936)
- We're in the Legion Now! (1936)
- Tundra (1936)
- Zorro Rides Again (1937)
- Outlaws of Sonora (1938)
- Days of Jesse James (1939)
- Overland Mail (1939)
- The Son of Davy Crockett (1941)
- Tombstone, the Town Too Tough to Die (1942)
- Hitler's Madman (1943)
- They Were Expendable (1945)
- Galloping Thunder (1946)
- I Shot Billy the Kid (1950)
- Santa Fe (1951)
- High Noon (1952) - Fletcher (uncredited)
- Salome (1953)
