= Bill Patton (actor) =

American actor (1894–1951)

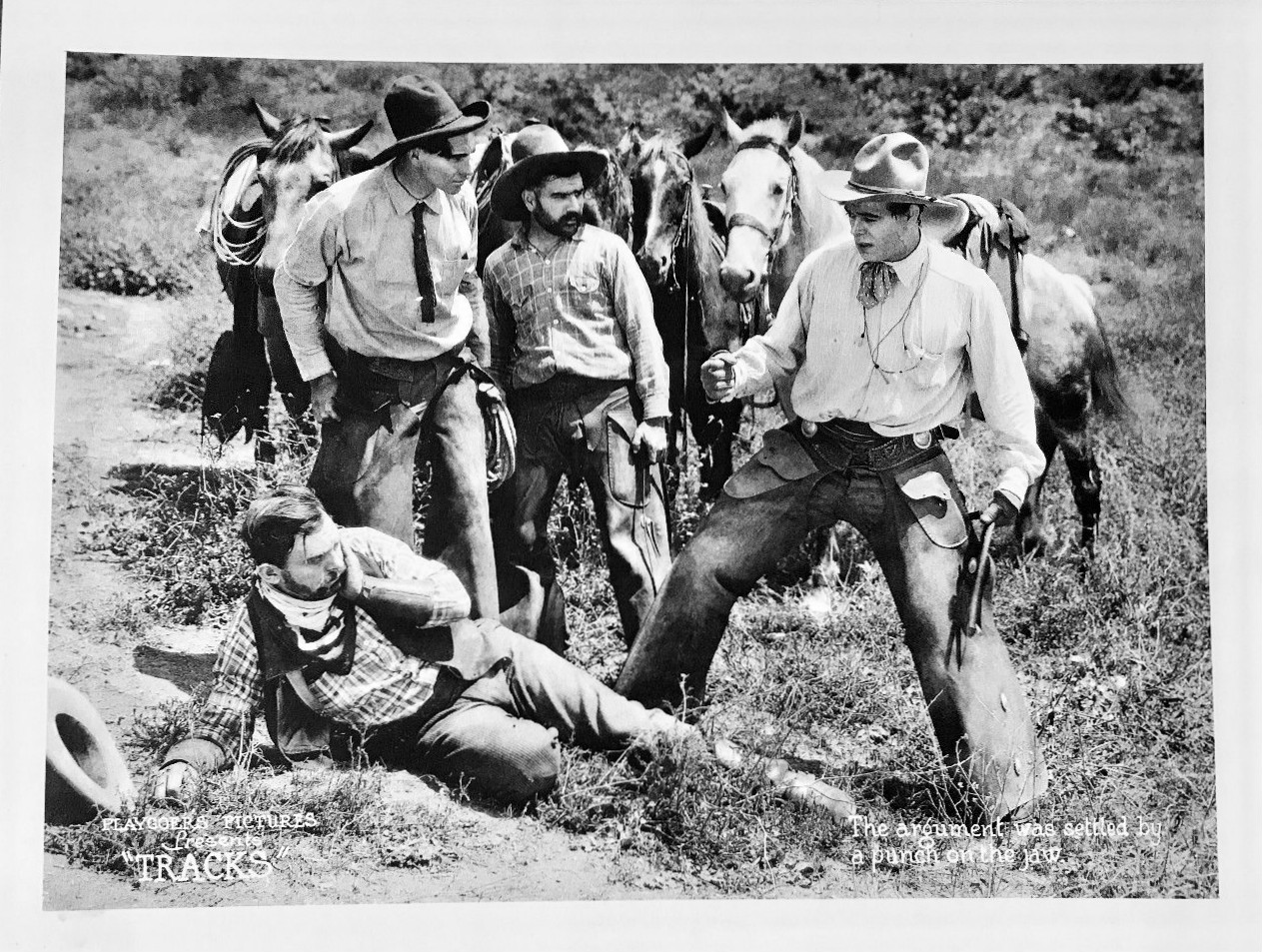
- Lobby card for Tracks (1922) with Patton at right
- Born: William P. Patton; June 2, 1894; Amarillo, Texas, United States
- Died: December 12, 1951 (aged 57); Los Angeles, California, United States
- Occupation: Actor
- Years active: 1918–1945

Bill Patton (June 2, 1894 – December 12, 1951) was an American actor of the silent and early sound eras. Born in Amarillo, Texas, he debuted in the film industry in The Boss of the Lazy Y in 1918. After small roles in several films, he received his first starring role in 1921's Outlawed. Over the next six years he starred in more than 20 films. In 1927, he returned to smaller roles, which continued through the advent of talking pictures. His last performance on screen was in a small role in the classic The Picture of Dorian Gray in 1945. He died on December 12, 1951.

== Filmography ==
(Per AFI database)

- The Boss of the Lazy Y (1917)
- Wild Life (1918)
- Bare-Fisted Gallagher (1919)
- Leave It to Susan (1919)
- A Sagebrush Hamlet (1919)
- Outlawed (1921)
- Bulldog Courage (1922)
- Tracks (1922)
- Cyclone Jones (1923)
- Ace of the Law (1924)
- Battlin' Buckaroo (1924)
- The Desert Secret (1924)
- Fighting Odds (1924)
- Fightin' Thru (1924)
- A Game Fighter (1924)
- The Last Man (1924)
- The Smoking Trail (1924)
- Fangs of Fate (1925)
- Flashing Steeds (1925)
- Tonio, Son of the Sierras (1925)
- Under Fire (1926)
- Beyond the Trail (1926)
- The Winning of Barbara Worth(1926)
- Fort Frayne (1926)
- The Last Chance (1926)
- Lucky Spurs (1926)
- Paths of Flame (1926)
- Western Trails (1926)
- The Flying U Ranch (1927)
- Orphan of the Sage (1928)
- The Bantam Cowboy (1928)
- The Pinto Kid (1928)
- Yellow Contraband (1928)
- Young Whirlwind (1928)
- Below the Deadline (1929)
- The Freckled Rascal (1929)
- Pals of the Prairie (1929)
- The Vagabond Cub (1929)
- The White Outlaw (1929)
- Beau Bandit (1930)
- Desert Vengeance (1931)
- Not Exactly Gentlemen (1931)
- Battling Buckaroo (1932)
- Guns for Hire (1932)
- Strawberry Roan (1933)
- Fighting Through (1934)
- Twisted Rails (1934)
- The Westerner (1934)
- The Way of the West (1934)
- The Brand of Hate (1934)
- The Cowboy and the Bandit (1935)
- The Ghost Rider (1935)
- Pals of the Range (1935)
- Arizona Trails (1935)
- Desert Mesa (1935)
- Five Bad Men (1935)
- The Rawhide Terror (1935)
- Desert Guns (1936)
- Dodge City Trail (1937)
- Deep in the Heart of Texas (1942)
- Little Joe, the Wrangler (1942)
- The Desperadoes (1943)
- The Picture of Dorian Gray (1945)
