= Tonio, Son of the Sierras =

1925 film

- Directed by: Ben F. Wilson
- Written by: George W. Pyper
- Based on: Tonio, Son of the Sierras by Charles King
- Produced by: J. Charles Davis
- Starring: Ben F. Wilson; Neva Gerber; Robert Walker; Ruth Royce
- Cinematography: Alfred Gosden
- Production company: J. Charles Davis Productions
- Distributed by: Davis Distributing Division
- Release date: December 19, 1925
- Running time: 50 minutes
- Country: United States
- Languages: Silent; English intertitles

Tonio, Son of the Sierras is a 1925 American silent Western film directed by Ben F. Wilson and starring Wilson, Neva Gerber, Robert Walker and Ruth Royce. It is based on the novel of the same name by Charles King.

== Cast ==
- Ben F. Wilson as Lt. Harris
- Neva Gerber as Evelyn Brower
- Robert Walker as Lt. Booth
- Chief Yowlachie as Tonio
- Jim Welch as Col. Brower
- Ruth Royce as Mrs. Bennett
- Dick Hatton as Sanchez
- Bill Patton as Henchman
- Fred Gamble as Lt. Willet
- Fay Adams as Lt. Downs
- Merrill McCormick as Soldier

== Bibliography ==
- Connelly, Robert B. The Silents: Silent Feature Films, 1910-36, Volume 40, Issue 2. December Press, 1998.
- Munden, Kenneth White. The American Film Institute Catalog of Motion Pictures Produced in the United States, Part 1. University of California Press, 1997.
