= The Desperate Game =

1926 film

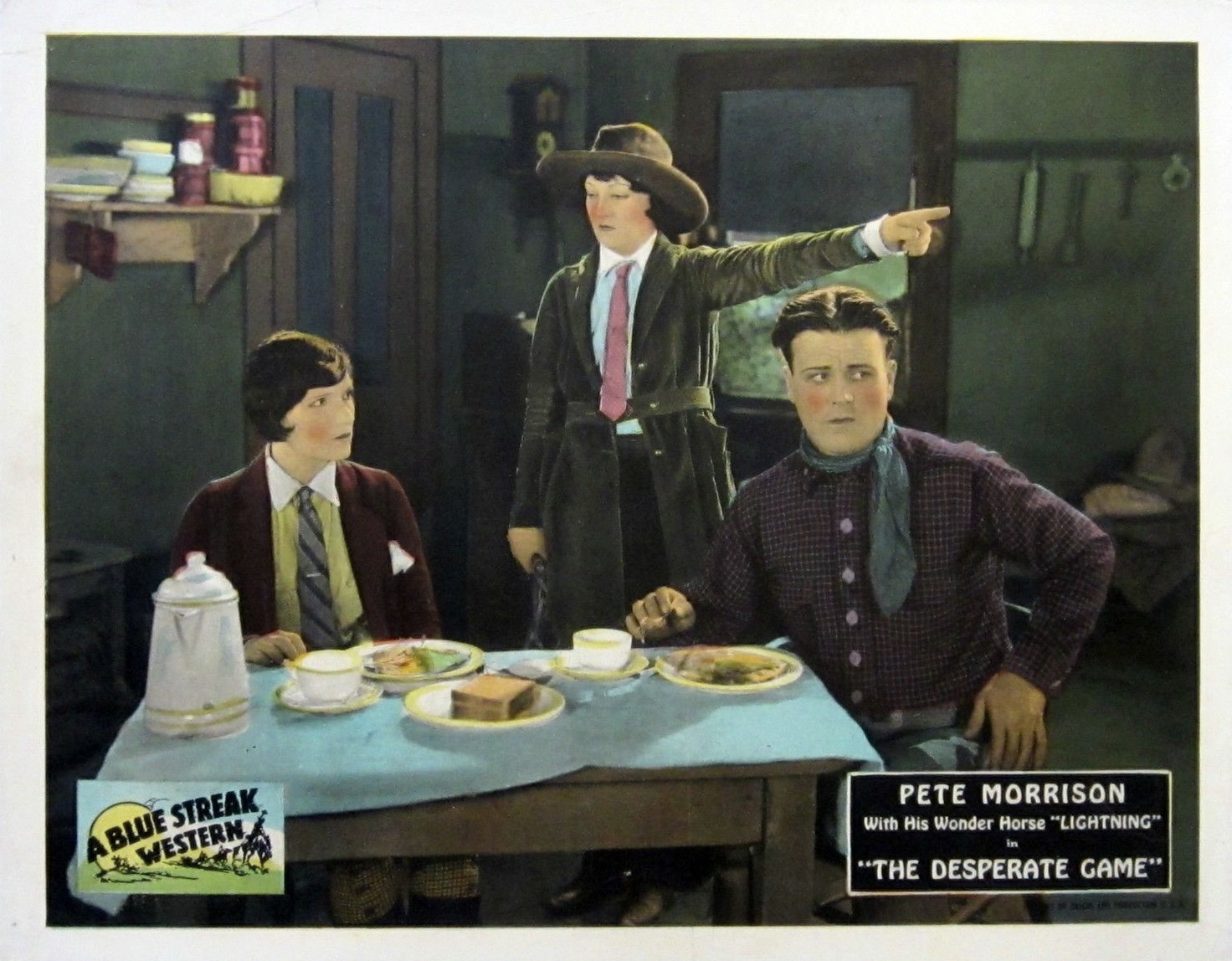
- Lobby card
- Directed by: Joseph Franz; Milburn Morante
- Written by: George Elwood Jenks; Frank S. Beresford
- Produced by: Carl Laemmle
- Starring: Pete Morrison; Lew Meehan; Bert Lindley
- Cinematography: William Thornley
- Production company: Universal Pictures
- Distributed by: Universal Pictures
- Release date: February 14, 1926
- Running time: 51 minutes
- Country: United States
- Languages: Silent; English intertitles

The Desperate Game is a 1926 American silent Western film directed by Joseph Franz and Milburn Morante. It stars Pete Morrison, Lew Meehan, and Bert Lindley.

== Cast ==
- Pete Morrison as Jim Wesley
- Dolores Gardner as Marguerite Grayson
- Jim Welch as Mr. Wesley - Jim's Father
- Jere Austin as Mel Larrimer
- J.P. Lockney as Adam Grayson
- Al Richmond as Montana McGraw
- Virginia Warwick as Belle Deane
- Lew Meehan as Bat Grayson
- Milburn Morante as Shinney
- Merrill McCormick as Luke Grayson
- Bert Lindley as Pat Davis
