= Leander de Cordova =

Jamaican-American actor and film director (1877–1969)

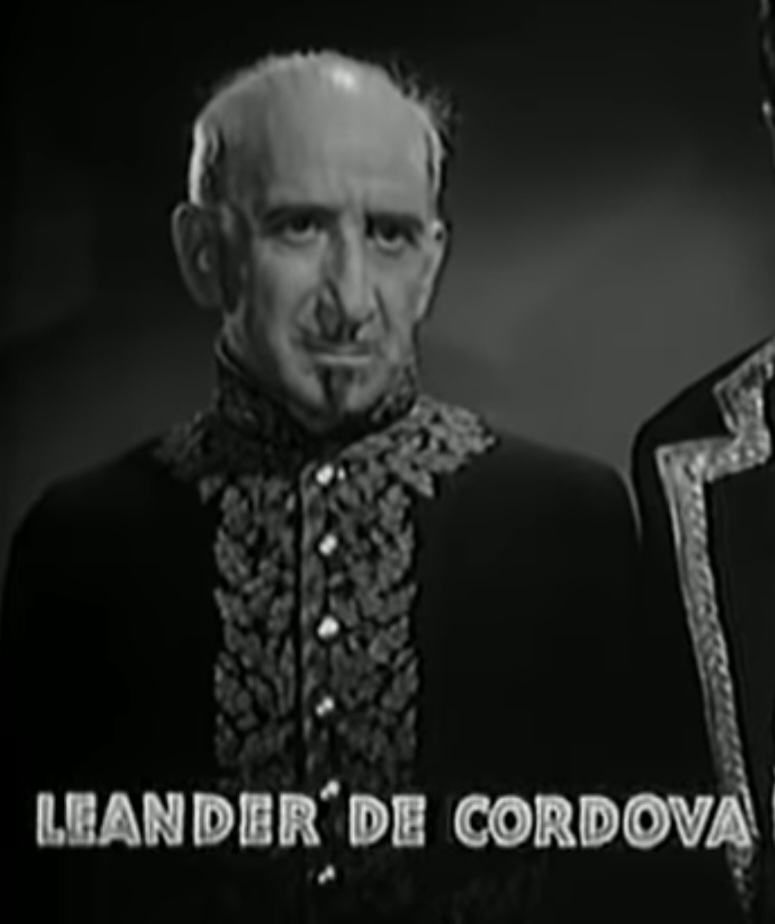
- Cordova in Zorro's Fighting Legion (1939)
- Born: 5 December 1877; Kingston, Jamaica, British West Indies
- Died: 19 September 1969 (aged 91); Los Angeles, California, U.S.
- Occupations: Actor; film director
- Years active: 1919–1951
- Relatives: Rudolph de Cordova (brother); Jacob de Cordova (grand-uncle)

Leander de Cordova (5 December 1877 – 19 September 1969) was a Jamaican-born American actor and film director. He was the brother of Rudolph de Cordova. He was the son of Altamont de Cordova and Katherine Lewis. He was also the grandnephew of Jacob de Cordova.

== Selected filmography ==
=== Acted ===
- The Penal Code (1932) – Isaac Lewin
- Dick Tracy (1937, Serial) – Stevens (uncredited)
- The Emperor's Candlesticks (1937) – Bidder (uncredited)
- Midnight (1939) – Footman (uncredited)
- Torture Ship (1939) – Ezra Matthews
- Zorro's Fighting Legion (1939, Serial) – Felipe
- The Phantom Cowboy (1941) – Don Jose Toreno (uncredited)
- Prairie Pioneers (1941) – Father Garcia (uncredited)
- Mission to Moscow (1943) – Heckler (uncredited)
- The Laramie Trail (1944) – Esteban
- The Gay Senorita (1945) – Padre Anselmo (uncredited)
- Yolanda and the Thief (1945) – Elderly Butler (uncredited)
- Gilda (1946) – Servant (uncredited)
- Big Town (1946) – Minor Role (uncredited)
- Fear in the Night (1947) – Man (uncredited)
- Danger Street (1947) – Minor Role (uncredited)
- A Double Life (1947) – Audience Member (uncredited)
- Albuquerque (1948) – Townsman (uncredited)
- Casbah (1948) – Doorman (uncredited)
- The Mysterious Desperado (1949) – Padre
- Tough Assignment (1949) – Schultz
- According to Mrs. Hoyle (1951) – Pastor J. Berland

=== Directed ===
- A Scream in the Night (1919)
- Polly With a Past (1920)
- Love, Honor and Obey (1920)
- She (1925)
- After the Fog (1929)
- Trails of the Golden West (1931)
