= Trails of the Golden West =

1931 film

- Directed by: Leander De Cordova
- Written by: L. V. Jefferson
- Produced by: Robert J. Horner
- Starring: Jay Wilsey; Wanda Hawley; Tom London
- Cinematography: William C. Thompson
- Edited by: William Austin
- Production company: West Coast Pictures
- Distributed by: Cosmos Productions
- Release date: February 15, 1931
- Running time: 58 minutes
- Country: United States
- Language: English

Trails of the Golden West is a 1931 American Western film directed by Leander De Cordova and starring Jay Wilsey, Wanda Hawley and Tom London.

== Cast ==
- Jay Wilsey
- Wanda Hawley
- Tom London
- George Reed
- Horace B. Carpenter
- Merrill McCormick
- William Bertram
- Chief White Eagle

== Plot ==
Buffalo Bill, Jr. is a trail scout for a wagon train. Indians raid the wagon train, but he leads the others in the group to overcome the attack.

== Bibliography ==
- Rainey, Buck. Sweethearts of the Sage: Biographies and Filmographies of 258 actresses appearing in Western movies. McFarland & Company, 1992.
