= A Broadway Scandal =

1918 film

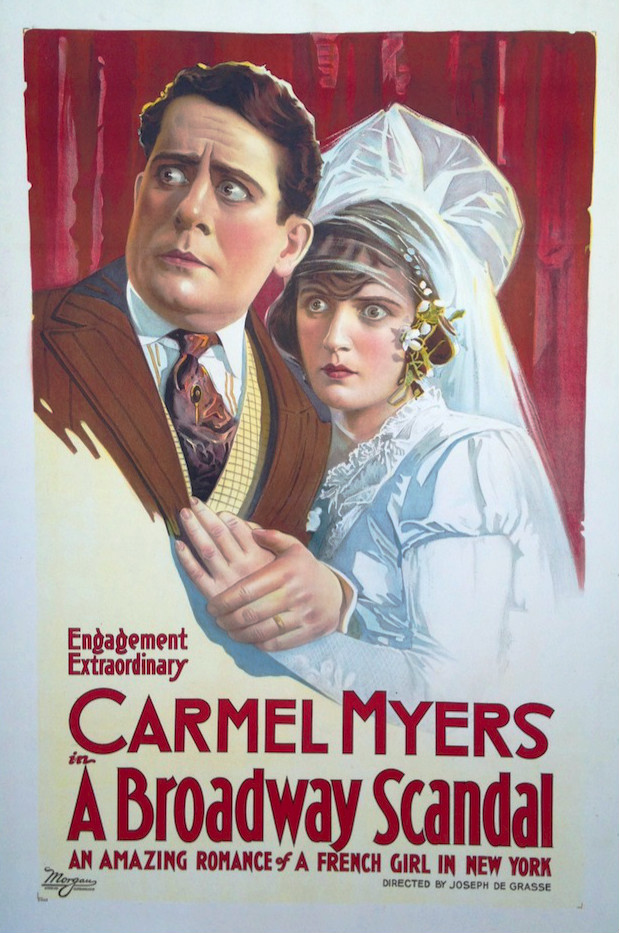
- Film poster
- Directed by: Joe De Grasse
- Written by: Harvey Gates
- Produced by: Bluebird Photoplays
- Starring: Lon Chaney; Carmel Myers; Edwin August
- Cinematography: Edward Ullman
- Distributed by: Universal Film Manufacturing Company
- Release date: June 1, 1918
- Running time: 5 reels (50 minutes)
- Country: United States
- Language: Silent (English intertitles)

A Broadway Scandal is a 1918 American silent romantic drama film directed by Joe De Grasse that features Carmel Myers, Lon Chaney and Edwin August. The screenplay was written by Harvey Gates. This would be Lon Chaney's last film for director Joe De Grasse, ending a multiyear collaboration between the two men. The film's tagline was "Engagement Extraordinary! An Amazing Romance of a French Girl in New York". It is today considered to be a lost film. A still exists showing Lon Chaney as Kink Colby, together with the other main players in the shot.

== Plot ==
Nenette Bisson, an adventurous French girl, is shot in the shoulder by the police while joyriding in a stolen car with a lowlife punk named "Kink" Colby. Nenette is taken to the Kendall Hospital, where she becomes infatuated with her young physician, David Kendall. Kendall, believing all French women to be frivolous, toys with Nenette's affections but will not look upon her as a serious candidate for marriage.

War breaks out and Dr. Kendall goes off to Europe to offer medical aid to the suffering. Nenette's father Armande runs a small cafe in New York City where Nenette sings for the patrons. Enraged, he throws her out when he learns of her involvement with Kink Colby. Over the next two years, Nenette goes on to become a Broadway star, but her attempts to win her father's forgiveness are fruitless.

One night, however, she shows up at the cafe unexpectedly and tries in vain to get her father to forgive her. Dr. Kendall, home from the war after two years, has come to value the courage of French women while he was stationed in Europe. He seeks out Nenette at the cafe and proposes marriage to her. He later helps her to win back her father's love and approval.

== Cast ==
- Carmel Myers as Nenette Bisson
- Edwin August as Dr. David Kendall
- Lon Chaney as "Kink" Colby
- Andrew Robson as Armande Bisson (Nenette's father)
- W. H. Bainbridge as the elder Dr. Kendall (David's father)
- S. K. Shilling as Paul Caval
- Fred Gamble as Falkner

== Reception ==
Moving Picture World gave the film a positive review and highlighted the acting of Carmel Myers specifically as a positive for the movie.

== Censorship ==
Like many American films of the time, A Broadway Scandal was subject to restrictions and cuts by city and state film censorship boards. For example, the Chicago Board of Censors cut, in Reel 2, the shooting of a motorcycle policeman.
