= Smiling Jim =

1922 film

- Directed by: Joseph J. Franz
- Written by: Hal C. Norfleet
- Produced by: Phil Goldstone
- Starring: Franklyn Farnum; Alma Bennett; Percy Challenger
- Cinematography: Edgar Lyons
- Production company: Phil Goldstone Productions
- Release date: April 1, 1922 (US)
- Running time: 5 reels
- Country: United States
- Languages: Silent; English intertitles

Smiling Jim is a 1922 American silent Western film directed by Joseph J. Franz from a screenplay by Hal C. Norfleet. The film stars Franklyn Farnum, Alma Bennett, and Percy Challenger.

== Cast ==
- Franklyn Farnum as Smiling Jim/Frank Harmon
- Alma Bennett as Louise Briggs
- Percy Challenger as Judd Briggs
- Al Ferguson as Sheriff Thomas
