= Five Bad Men =

1935 film directed by Clifford S. Smith

- Theatrical release poster
- Directed by: Clifford S. Smith
- Screenplay by: Harry L. Fraser
- Starring: Noah Beery Jr. Bill Patton; Jay Wilsey
- Cinematography: Paul Eagler
- Edited by: Earl Turner
- Production company: Sunset Studios
- Distributed by: State Rights
- Release date: 1935 (US)
- Running time: 6 reels
- Country: United States
- Language: English

Five Bad Men is a 1935 American Western film directed by Clifford S. Smith, starring Noah Beery Jr., Bill Patton, and Jay Wilsey.

== Cast ==
- Noah Beery Jr. as Gene Taggart
- Bill Patton as Bad man
- Jay Wilsey (credited as Buffalo Bill Jr.) as Bad man
- Hal Taliaferro credited as Wally Wales) as Bad man
- Pete Morrison as Bad man
- Art Mix as Bad man
- William Desmond as Mattoon
- Billy Franey as Billy
- Frank Yaconelli as Tony
- Steve Clemento as Rodriguez
- Claude Hart as Sam
- Shirley Wells as Olga
- Louise Larabee as Marie
- Jack Rockwell
- Helen Gibson as Mrs. Swift
- Tom London as Gangster
- Lew Meehan as Gangster
- Pat Harmon as Cafe manager
- Duke R. Lee as Sheriff
- Sally Dolling as Janet Bartlett
- Edward Coxen as Sim Bartlett
- Bartlett Carré as Lige Jenkins
- Mrs. Jack Hoxie as Mrs. Jenkins

== Reception ==
The Devon and Exeter Gazette called the film "a thrilling outdoor drama in which there is plenty of gunplay" The Progressive Age stated, "You can expect some slap-bang action and loads of good entertainment."
