= After the Fog =

1929 film directed by Leander De Cordova

- Directed by: Leander De Cordova
- Written by: George Terwilliger; Arthur F. Statter
- Produced by: Robert S. Furst
- Starring: Mary Philbin; Edmund Burns; Carmelita Geraghty
- Cinematography: Charles P. Boyle
- Production company: Beacon Productions
- Distributed by: Weiss Brothers; Affiliated Exchanges; Wardour Films (UK)
- Release date: December 15, 1929
- Running time: 62 minutes
- Country: United States
- Language: English

After the Fog is a 1929 pre-Code drama film directed by Leander De Cordova and starring Mary Philbin, Edmund Burns and Carmelita Geraghty. It was an early sound film, made during the transition from silent films. A separate silent version was also produced. It was Philbin's final acting role.

== Plot ==
Joshua Barker and his family have tended a lighthouse for generations, and he wants his daughter Faith to remain in the area and marry a local fisherman. However she dreams of a more exciting life and is won over when a socialite arrives in a yacht. She marries him and this sends her father over the edge, leading him to attack her with an axe.

== Cast ==
- Mary Philbin as Faith Barker
- Edmund Burns as John Temple
- Carmelita Geraghty as Winifred Blake
- Russell Simpson as Joshua Barker
- Margaret Seddon as Letitia Barker
- Allan Simpson as Phil Langhorne
- Joseph Bennett as Bill Reynolds

== See also ==
- List of early sound feature films (1926–1929)

== Bibliography ==
- Munden, Kenneth White. The American Film Institute Catalog of Motion Pictures Produced in the United States, Part 1. University of California Press, 1997.
