= Her First Mate =

1933 film

- Film poster
- Directed by: William Wyler
- Written by: Frank Craven (play); John Golden (play); Daniel Jarrett (play); Clarence Marks; Earle Snell; H. M. Walker
- Produced by: Carl Laemmle, Jr.
- Starring: Slim Summerville; ZaSu Pitts; Una Merkel; Warren Hymer; Berton Churchill; George F. Marion
- Cinematography: George Robinson
- Edited by: Ted J. Kent
- Production company: Universal Pictures
- Distributed by: Universal Pictures
- Release date: August 3, 1933
- Running time: 66 minutes
- Country: United States
- Language: English

Her First Mate is a 1933 American pre-Code comedy film directed by William Wyler and written by Clarence Marks, Earle Snell and H. M. Walker, who adapted it from the play written by Frank Craven, John Golden and Daniel Jarrett. The film stars Slim Summerville, ZaSu Pitts, Una Merkel, Warren Hymer, Berton Churchill and George F. Marion. The film was released on August 3, 1933, by Universal Pictures.

== Plot ==
A peanut and candy butcher on an Albany night boat dreams of owning his own boat.

== Cast ==
- Slim Summerville as John Horner
- ZaSu Pitts as Mary Horner
- Una Merkel as Hattie
- Warren Hymer as Percy
- Berton Churchill as Davis
- George F. Marion as Sam
- Henry Armetta as Nick Socrates
