= Fightin' Mad =

1921 film

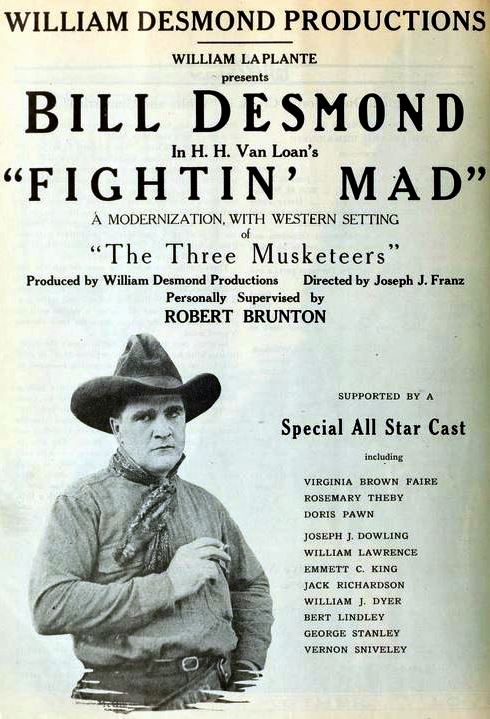
- Theatrical release poster
- Directed by: Joseph Franz
- Written by: H.H. Van Loan
- Produced by: Robert Brunton; William Desmond
- Starring: William Desmond; Virginia Brown Faire; Rosemary Theby
- Cinematography: Harry W. Gerstad
- Production company: William Desmond Productions
- Distributed by: Metro Pictures
- Release date: November 20, 1921
- Running time: 60 minutes
- Country: United States
- Languages: Silent; English intertitles

Fightin' Mad is a 1921 American silent Western comedy film directed by Joseph Franz and starring William Desmond, Virginia Brown Faire and Rosemary Theby.

== Cast ==
- William Desmond as Bud McGraw
- Virginia Brown Faire as Peggy Hughes
- Doris Pawn as Eileen Graham
- Rosemary Theby as Nita de Garma
- Joseph J. Dowling as James McGraw
- W.E. Lawrence as Francisco Lazaro
- Emmett King as Howard Graham
- Jack Richardson as Amos Rawson
- William J. Dyer as Obadiah Brennan
- Bert Lindley as Micah Higgins
- George Stanley as Colonel Gates
- Vernon Snively as Captain Farley

== Bibliography ==
- Connelly, Robert B. The Silents: Silent Feature Films, 1910-36, Volume 40, Issue 2. December Press, 1998.
- Munden, Kenneth White. The American Film Institute Catalog of Motion Pictures Produced in the United States, Part 1. University of California Press, 1997.
