= Joseph Franz (director) =

American actor and director (1883–1970)

- Born: October 12, 1883; Utica, New York, United States
- Died: September 9, 1970 (aged 86); Los Angeles, California, United States
- Occupations: Director, actor
- Years active: 1913-1939 (film)

Joseph J. Franz (October 12, 1883 – September 9, 1970) was an actor and film director during the silent film era in the United States. Franz was born in Utica, New York. He died in Los Angeles in 1970. He was sometimes credited as Joseph J. Franz. He features in a Frontier advertisement with two of the studio's other stars.

Franz acted on stage in stock theater for three years before he began acting in films.

== Filmography ==
=== Actor ===
- Honor the Law (1938), a 39 installment series of 15 minute episodes
- Good Dame (1934) as Detective Scanlon (credited as Joseph J. Franz)
- Easy Come, Easy Go (1928) as a detective
- The Devil's Trail (1919) (credited as J.J. France)
- The Mints of Hell (1919) as Sgt. Blake
- The End of the Game (1919) as Hotel Clerk (credited as J.J. Franz)
- Life's a Funny Proposition (1919) as Horace Pendleton
- The Pretender (1918 film) as Percival Longstreet (credited as Joseph J. Franz)
- The Law at Silver Camp (1915), a short, as Kerns - the Stagecoach Driver (credited as Joseph J. Franz)
- Gangsters of the Hills (1915)
- The Decree of Destiny (1915)
- When Shadows Fall (1915)
- Christmas at Lonesome Gulch (1915)
- Her Birthday Present (1914)
- Joe's Retribution (1914)
- The Hello Girl of Angel Camp (1914)
- The Rustler Outwitted (1914)
- The School Teacher at Angel Camp (1914)
- The Circle of Gold (1914)
- The Bandit of Devil's Gap (1914)
- The Moccasin Print (1914)
- Dolly's Deliverance (1914)
- The Girl from Texas (1914
- The Scarecrow's Secret (1914)
- In the Hollow of an Oak (1914)
- Four Days (1914)
- The Man in the Attic (1914)
- A Rose of Yesterday (1914)
- Cattle (1914 film)
- Under Arizona Skies (1914)
- The Janitor's Son (1914)
- The Strange Signal (1914)
- A Frontier Romance (1914)
- The Mind's Awakening (1914)
- When Memory Recalls (1914)
- The Ranger's Reward (1914)
- The Fight in Lonely Gulch (1914)
- The Broken Barrier (1914)
- On the Verge (1914)
- The Gun Men of Plumas (1914)
- His Dress Rehearsal (1914)
- The Girl and the Hobo (1914)
- Brother for Brother (1914)
- The Sheriff's Story (1914)
- Won by Wire (1914)
- The Outlaw's Daughter (1914)
- The Runaway (1914 film)
- Nugget Nell's Ward (1914)
- Man's Best Friend (1914 film)
- The Poison (1914 film)
- Strange Evidence (1914)
- The Girl Bandit (1914)
- The Sheriff's Deputy (1914)
- His Younger Brother (1914)
- The Mystery of Buffalo Gap (1914)
- So Shall Ye Reap (1914)
- The Fatal Card (1914 film) (1914)
- The Heart of Smiling Joe (1914)
- Put Yourself in His Place (1914 film) (1914)
- The Turning Point (1914)
- I Abide with Me (1914)
- Her Brother (1914 film)
- Crossroads (1914 film)
- The Winning Stroke (1914)
- His Father (1913)
- The Circuit Rider of the Hills (1913)
- When Spirits Walk (1913)
- A Hasty Jilting (1913)
- The Frontier Twins Start Something (1913)
- Big Bluff Joe (1913)
- College Holiday as a cop (uncredited) (1936)
- Invitation to Happiness (1939) as a reporter (uncredited)
- I'm from Missouri as a timekeeper (1939)(uncredited)

== Director ==
- A Sagebrush Hamlet (1919)
- The Blue Bandanna (1919)
- The Cave Girl (1921)
- Fightin' Mad (1921)
- Tracks (1922)
- Steppin' Fast (1923)

== Selected filmography ==
- A Sagebrush Hamlet (1919)
- Bare-Fisted Gallagher (1919)
- The Gray Wolf's Ghost (1919)
- The Blue Bandanna (1919)
- A Broadway Cowboy (1920)
- The Parish Priest (1920)
- The Cave Girl (1921)
- Fightin' Mad (1921)
- The Love Gambler (1922)
- Youth Must Have Love (1922)
- Tracks (1922)
- Smiling Jim (1922)
- The New Teacher (1922)
- Stepping Fast (1923)
- Alias the Night Wind (1923)
- The Pell Street Mystery (1924)
- Blue Blazes (1926)
- The Desperate Game (1926)

== Bibliography ==
- Munden, Kenneth White. The American Film Institute Catalog of Motion Pictures Produced in the United States, Part 1. University of California Press, 1997.
