= The Gambling Fool =

1925 film

- Directed by: J. P. McGowan
- Written by: J. P. McGowan
- Produced by: Jesse J. Goldburg; Independent Pictures Corporation
- Starring: Franklyn Farnum
- Cinematography: King D. Gray
- Distributed by: Independent Pictures Corporation
- Release dates: November 1, 1924 (premiere in Riverdale, Illinois); January 1925 (nationwide)
- Running time: 5 reels
- Country: United States
- Languages: Silent; English intertitles

The Gambling Fool is a 1925 silent Western film directed by J. P. McGowan starring Franklyn Farnum.

== Plot ==
As described in a film magazine review, an honest gambler arrives at a tough town to meet the hard-hearted owner of a ranch. He wins the ranch and pays the back taxes on it in time to prevent it from being auctioned off. He finds an infant in the ranch house, rescuing it from the arch villain. He also protects the infant's aunt. Later, he overcomes the villains and triumphs in romance.

== Cast ==
- Franklyn Farnum as Jack Stanford
- Otto Meyer as Stringy Hawkins (credited as Otto Myers)
- Fred Holmes as Plump Parker
- Harry S. Northrup as Lightning Cass
- Jack P. Pierce as Bud Fitzroy (credited as Jack Pierce)
- Ralph Yearsley as George Morgan
- Mary Louise Montague as Morgan's Child
- Joseph W. Girard as George Hartford
- Ruth Dwyer as Mary Hartford

== Preservation ==
This picture is preserved in the Library of Congress collection.
