= Franklyn Farnum =

American actor (1878–1961)

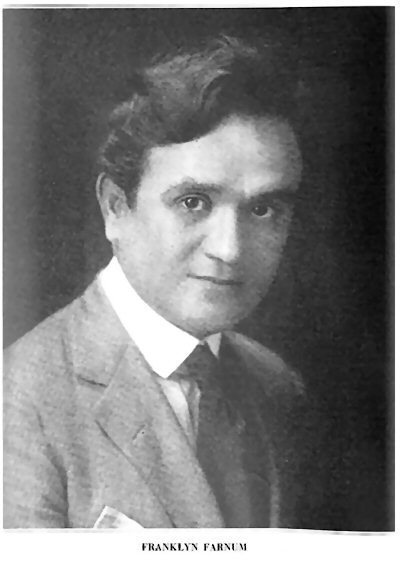
- Farnum in the fan magazine Photoplay, 1917
- Born: William Smith; June 5, 1878; Boston, Massachusetts, US
- Died: July 4, 1961 (aged 83); Woodland Hills, California, US
- Other name: Frank Farnum
- Occupations: Actor; vaudevillian
- Years active: 1913–1961
- Spouses: Alma Rubens (m. 1918; div. 1919) Edith Goodwin Walker (m. 1924; died 1959)
- Children: 1

Signature
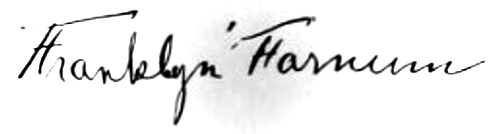

Franklyn Farnum (born William Smith, also credited as Frank Farnum; June 5, 1878 – July 4, 1961) was an American character actor and Hollywood extra who appeared in at least 1,100 films. Farnum appeared in eight films that won the Academy Award for Best Picture.

== Life and career ==
Farnum's Broadway credits include Keep It Clean (1929), Ziegfeld 9 O'clock Frolic (1921), Ziegfeld Midnight Frolic (1921), and Somewhere Else (1913).

Farnum's career was dominated mostly by westerns. Some of his films include the serial Vanishing Trails (1920) and the features The Clock (1917), The Firebrand (1922), The Drug Store Cowboy (1925), and The Gambling Fool (1925). He left films in 1925 but returned five years later at the advent of sound, only to find himself billed much further down the credits, if billed at all. However, he continued on in these obscure roles well into the 1950s.

One of his three wives was actress Alma Rubens, to whom he was briefly married in 1918. The couple divorced in 1919. He had one daughter, actress Geraldine Rose Farnum (b. 1924), by his third wife Edith Goodwin Farnum nee Walker.

Farnum appeared in a record-eight Academy Award for Best Picture winners: The Life of Emile Zola (1937), Going My Way (1944), The Lost Weekend (1945), Gentleman's Agreement (1947), All About Eve (1950), The Greatest Show on Earth (1952), Around the World in 80 Days (1956), and The Apartment (1960). He shares the record with fellow character actress Bess Flowers; Farnum and Flowers appeared together (both uncredited) in All About Eve, The Greatest Show on Earth, and Around the World in 80 Days.

On July 4, 1961, Farnum died of cancer at the Motion Picture & Television Country House and Hospital in Woodland Hills, California, at the age of 83.

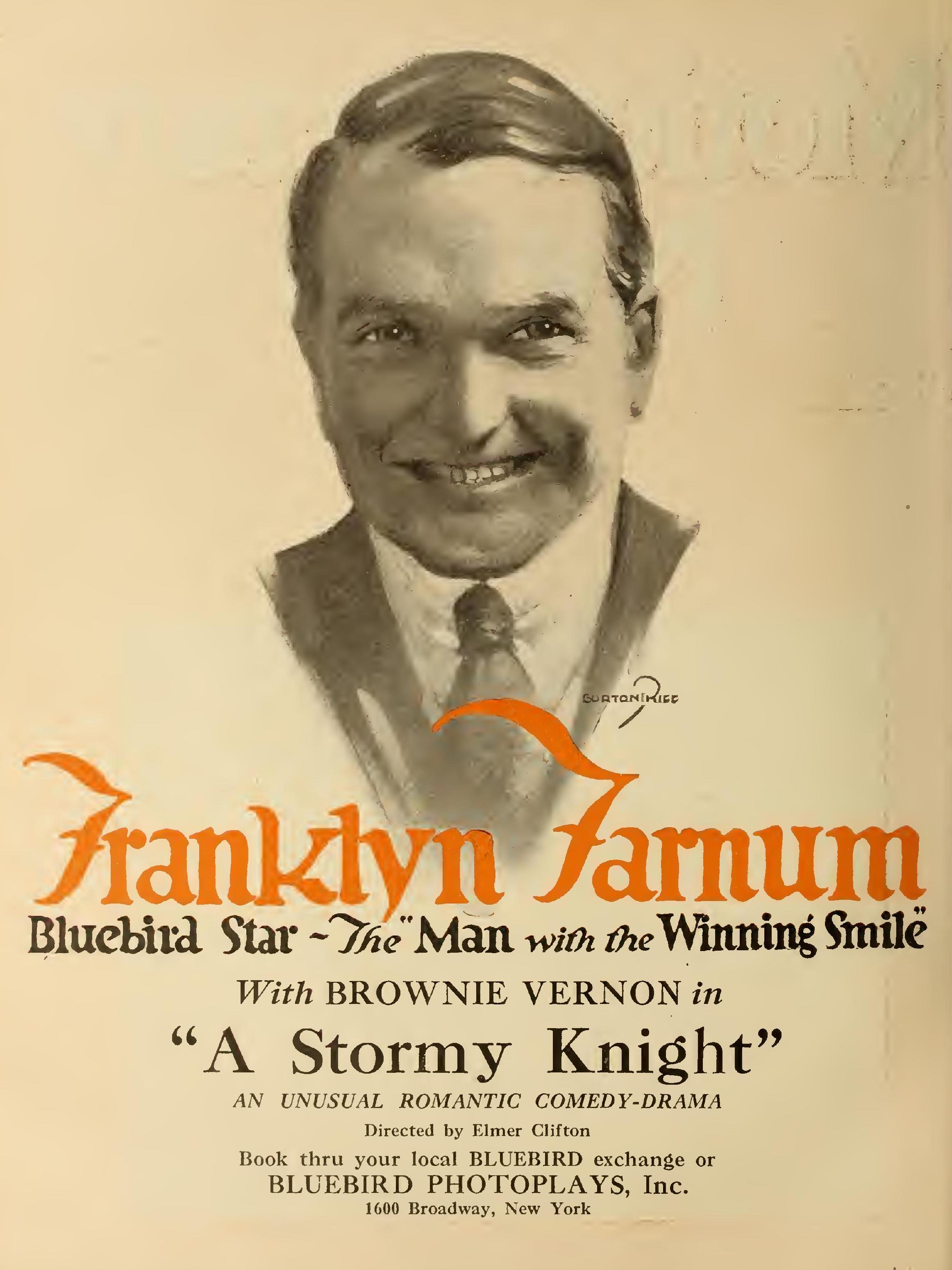
A Stormy Knight ad in 1917

== Selected filmography ==
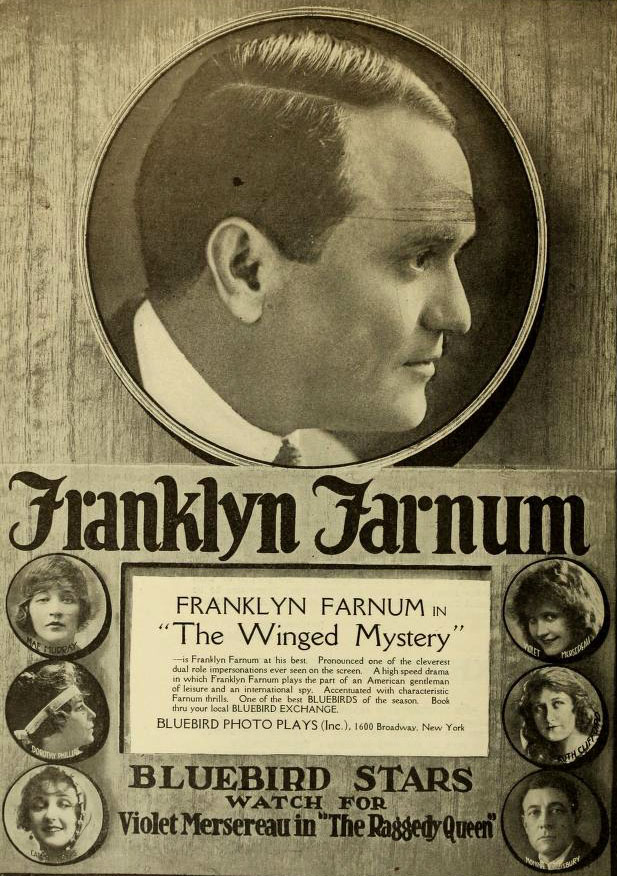
The Winged Mystery (1917)

=== 1910s ===
- The Devil's Pay Day (1917) – Gregory Van Houten
- The Man Who Took a Chance (1917) – Monty Gray
- The Clock (1917) – Jack Tempest
- Bringing Home Father (1917) – Peter Drake
- The Car of Chance (1917) – Arnold Baird
- The Clean-Up (1917) – Stuart Adams
- The Empty Gun (1917, Short) – Robber
- A Stormy Knight (1917) – John Winton
- Anything Once (1917) – Teddy Crosby
- The Winged Mystery (1917) – Captain August Sieger / Louis Siever
- The Scarlet Car (1917) – Billy Winthrop
- Fast Company (1918) – Lawrence Percival Van Huyler
- $5,000 Reward (1918) – Dick Arlington
- The Fighting Grin (1918) – Billy Kennedy
- The Empty Cab (1918) – Henry Egbert Xerxes
- In Judgement Of (1918) – Dr. John O'Neill
- Rough and Ready (1918) – Richard Bolton / Spike O'Brien
- The Vanity Pool (1918) – Drew Garrett
- Go-Get-Em Garringer (1919) – Garringer
- The Virtuous Model (1919) – Edward Dorin

=== 1920s ===
- Vanishing Trails (1920) – Silent Joe
- The Galloping Devil (1920) – Andy Green
- The Land of Jazz (1920) – Minor Role
- The Fighting Stranger (1921) – Australia Joe
- The Hunger of the Blood (1921) – Maslun
- The Last Chance (1921) – Rance Sparr
- The Struggle (1921) – Dick Storm
- The Raiders (1921) – Private Fitzgerald, RCMP
- The White Masks (1921) – Jack Bray
- So This Is Arizona (1922) – Norman Russell
- Smiling Jim (1922) – Smiling Jim / Frank Harmon
- When East Comes West (1922) – Jones
- Texas (1922)
- Trail's End (1922) – Wilder Armstrong
- Angel Citizens (1922) – Frank Bartlett
- Gun Shy (1922) – James Brown
- Gold Grabbers (1922)
- The Firebrand (1922) – Bill Holt
- Cross Roads (1922) – The Hero
- Wolves of the Border (1923)
- The Man Getter (1923)
- It Happened Out West (1923)
- Two Fisted Tenderfoot (1924)
- Baffled (1924) – Dick Osborne
- Crossed Trails (1924) – Tom Dawson
- Western Vengeance (1924) – Jack Caldwell
- Calibre 45 (1924)
- Battling Brewster (1924, Serial) – Battling Jack Brewster
- Courage (1924)
- A Desperate Adventure (1924)
- Border Intrigue (1925) – Tom Lassen
- The Gambling Fool (1925) – Jack Stanford
- The Drug Store Cowboy (1925) – Marmaduke Grandon
- The Bandit Tamer (1925) – William Warren
- Billy the Kid (1925) – Bill Bonney
- The Train Wreckers (1925) – Jack Stewart
- Rough Going (1925) – Himself
- Two Gun Sap (1925)
- Double-Barreled Justice (1925)
- Pals of the West (1927)

=== 1930s ===
- Beyond the Rio Grande (1930) – Joe Kemp
- Beyond the Law (1930) – Army Lieutenant
- The Third Alarm (1930) – Fire Department Captain
- Dames Ahoy! (1930) - Master of Ceremonies (uncredited)
- Oklahoma Jim (1931) – Army Captain
- Hell's Valley (1931) - Manuel Valdez
- Left Over Ladies (1931) - Benson
- Mark of the Spur (1932) - Sheriff Jake Ludlow
- The Reckless Rider (1932) - Sheriff
- Human Targets (1932) - Sheriff
- Frontier Days (1934) - George Wilson
- Gold Diggers of 1935 (1935) - Bartender (uncredited)
- Fighting Caballero (1935) - Bartender
- Desert Mesa (1935) - Jones
- The Ghost Rider (1935) - Jim Bullard
- The Cowboy and the Bandit (1935) - Crooked Dealer
- What Becomes of the Children? (1936) - Shelby (uncredited)
- The Preview Murder Mystery (1936) - James Deley
- In Early Arizona (1938) - Spike, Henchman

=== 1940s ===
- Meet John Doe (1941) (uncredited)
- Appointment in Berlin (1943) - Royal Air Force Officer (uncredited)
- Hail the Conquering Hero (1944) - Town Councilman (uncredited)
- Going My Way (1944) - Church Usher (uncredited)
- The White Cliffs of Dover (1944) - Ball Guest (uncredited)
- The Lost Weekend (1945) - Concert Attendee / Barfly (uncredited)
- The Jolson Story (1946) - Man in Audience (uncredited)
- Gentleman's Agreement (1947) - Party Guest (uncredited)
- Monsieur Verdoux (1947) - Victim of the stock market crash (uncredited)
- Road to Rio (1947) - Ship Lounge Extra (uncredited)
- Angel on the Amazon (1948) - Diner (uncredited)
- Johnny Belinda (1948) - Man on Jury (uncredited)
- I Remember Mama (1948) - Drug Store Pharmacist (uncredited)
- The Fighting Kentuckian (1949) - De Marchand Party Guest (uncredited)

=== 1950s ===
- Destination Moon (1950) - Factory Worker (uncredited)
- Sunset Boulevard (1950) - Undertaker
- All About Eve (1950) - Sarah Siddons Awards Guest (uncredited)
- The Day the Earth Stood Still (1951) - Extra in Office Building Corridor (uncredited)
- Here Comes the Groom (1951) - Airplane Passenger (uncredited)
- The Bad and the Beautiful (1952) - Assistant on Set (uncredited)
- Carrie (1952) - Restaurant Patron (uncredited)
- The Greatest Show on Earth (1952) - Spectator (uncredited)
- The Beast from 20,000 Fathoms (1953) - Ballet-Goer (uncredited)
- White Christmas (1954) - Nightclub Patron (uncredited)
- Black Widow (1954) - Party Guest (uncredited)
- The Long, Long Trailer (1954) - Trailer Park Extra (uncredited)
- Alfred Hitchcock Presents (1955) (Season 1 Episode 6: "Salvage") - Party Guest (uncredited)
- No Man's Woman (1955) - Police Criminologist (uncredited)
- East of Eden (1955) - Townsman at Carnival (uncredited)
- You're Never Too Young (1955) - Man in Ticket Line (uncredited)
- Alfred Hitchcock Presents (1956) (Season 1 Episode 30: "Never Again") - Party Guest (uncredited)
- Around the World in 80 Days (1956) (uncredited)
- Gunfight at the O.K. Corral (1957) - Barfly (uncredited)
- My Man Godfrey (1937) - Scavenger Hunter / Party Guest (uncredited)
- King Creole (1958) - Drugstore Lunch Counterman (uncredited)
- Pillow Talk (1959) - Nightclub Patron (uncredited)
- Some Like It Hot (1959) - Party Guest (uncredited)
