= The Pecos Dandy =

1934 film

- Directed by: Victor Adamson; Horace B. Carpenter
- Written by: L.V. Jefferson
- Produced by: Victor Adamson; Bartlett A. Carre
- Starring: George J. Lewis; Dorothy Gulliver; Robert Walker
- Cinematography: Brydon Baker; Tom Galligan
- Edited by: Arthur Cohen
- Production company: Security Pictures
- Distributed by: Security Pictures
- Release date: March 3, 1934
- Running time: 55 minutes
- Country: United States
- Language: English

The Pecos Dandy is a 1934 American western film directed by Victor Adamson and Horace B. Carpenter and starring George J. Lewis, Dorothy Gulliver and Robert Walker. It was produced on Poverty Row as a second feature. It is now considered a lost film.

== Plot ==
The Pecos Dandy falls in love with a woman but his attempts to win her are threatened when he is accused of horse theft by a rival.

== Cast ==
- George J. Lewis as The Pecos Dandy
- Dorothy Gulliver as His Sweetheart
- Betty Lee as Girl
- Horace B. Carpenter
- Robert Walker
- Clyde McClary
- Victor Adamson

== Bibliography ==
- Pitts, Michael R. Poverty Row Studios, 1929–1940. McFarland & Company, 2005.
