= Anna Christie (1923 film) =

1923 film

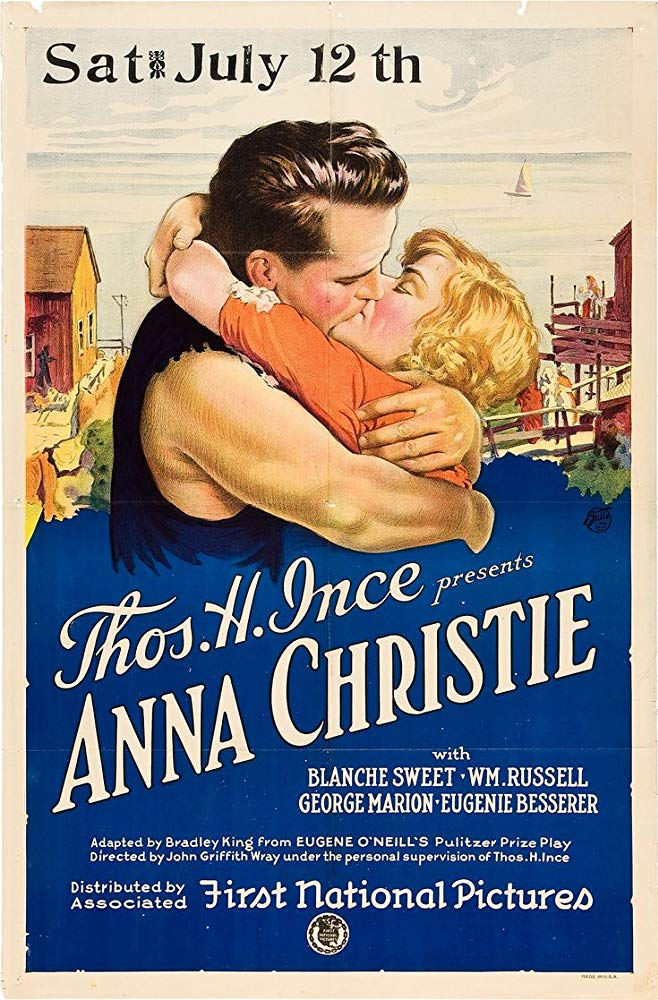
- Original 1923 theatrical poster
- Directed by: John Griffith Wray
- Written by: Bradley King (screenplay)
- Based on: Anna Christie; 1921 play by Eugene O'Neill
- Produced by: Thomas H. Ince
- Starring: Blanche Sweet; William Russell; George F. Marion
- Cinematography: Henry Sharp
- Distributed by: First National Pictures
- Release date: November 25, 1923
- Running time: 96 minutes
- Country: United States
- Language: Silent (English intertitles)
- Budget: $165,236

Anna Christie is a 1923 American silent film drama based on the 1921 play by Eugene O'Neill. It stars Blanche Sweet and William Russell.

Directed by John Griffith Wray and produced by Thomas H. Ince for First National Pictures, the screenplay was adapted by Bradley King from the Eugene O'Neill play of the same title. Thomas H. Ince Inc. paid a then-astronomical $35,000 for the screen rights to the play.

== Plot ==
Anna Christie (1923)

As described in a film magazine review, Anna Christie, daughter of rugged coal barge captain Chris Christopherson, has not seen her father since she was a baby. During her life on a farm, she has been betrayed by one man and been the mistress of another. Her father, unaware of her past, is determined to protect her from the advances of sailor folk. She takes a voyage with him and falls in love with drunken Matt Burke. She admits her sins and is rescued from suicide by Chris. She is forgiven by Matt who still wishes to wed her.

== Cast ==
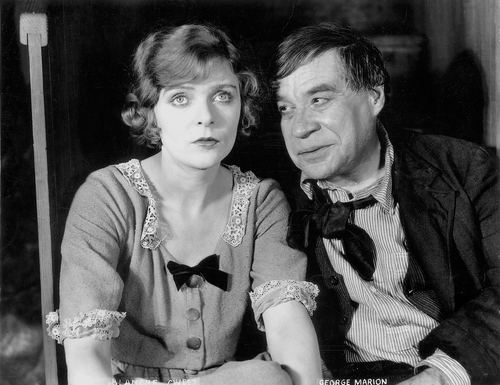
Still with Blanche Sweet and George Marion, Sr.

- Blanche Sweet as Anna Christie
- William Russell as Matt Burke
- George F. Marion as Chris Christopherson
- Eugénie Besserer as Marthy
- Ralph Yearsley as The Brutal Cousin
- Chester Conklin as Tommy
- George Siegmann as Anna's uncle
- Irving Bacon in a minor role
- Matthew Betz in a minor role
- Fred Kohler in a minor role
- Victor Potel in a minor role

== Preservation ==
Prints of Anna Christie are located in the Museum of Modern Art in New York City, George Eastman Museum Motion Picture Collection, Gosfilmofond in Moscow, Cineteca Del Friuli in Genoma, Italy, and the Harvard Film Archive.

== See also ==
- Blanche Sweet filmography
- Anna Christie (1930 film)
