= Julian de Cordova =

American businessman

- Born: January 2, 1851; New York City, New York, U.S.
- Died: November 23, 1945 (aged 94); Arlington, Massachusetts, U.S.
- Occupations: Businessman and art collector

Julian de Cordova (January 2, 1851 – November 23, 1945) was an American businessman and art collector. He bought the Union Glass Company in 1893, and was its president until its 1924 closure. He donated the land on which the DeCordova Sculpture Park and Museum now stands in Lincoln, Massachusetts.

== Career ==
de Cordova became a successful tea broker, wholesale merchant and investor. He lost his fortune in the financial panic of 1884, but managed to build it back up again.

In 1893, he bought the Union Glass Company in Somerville, Massachusetts. He was its president until 1924, when it closed.

== Personal life ==
Julian de Cordova was born in 1851, to Raphael Joshua de Cordova, a Jamaican merchant, and Fanny Blume Nathan, an Englishwoman. They were wed three years earlier.

He attended Harvard University between 1880 and 1882.

In 1876, de Cordova married Mary Elizabeth Dana, with whom he had one child: Julian Dana de Cordova, who was born on Christmas Day 1877.

The family summered in Lincoln, Massachusetts, where in 1910 they remodeled their home of twenty-seven years to resemble a European castle.

In 1930, de Cordova donated his home and 22 acres (8.9 ha) of land to the Town of Lincoln on the condition that a museum be founded upon his death. Although his collection of paintings was substantial, they were not altogether valuable. Their sale did help fund today's DeCordova Sculpture Park and Museum, however.

de Cordova's cousin was Rudolph de Cordova, the Jamaican-born British writer and actor.

== Death ==
de Cordova died at Ring Sanatorium in Arlington, Massachusetts, in 1945, aged 94. He had been ill for some time. He was interred in Mount Auburn Cemetery in Cambridge, Massachusetts, alongside his wife, who preceded him in death by twenty-three years, and son, who died the year after his mother.
