= Youth Must Have Love =

1922 film

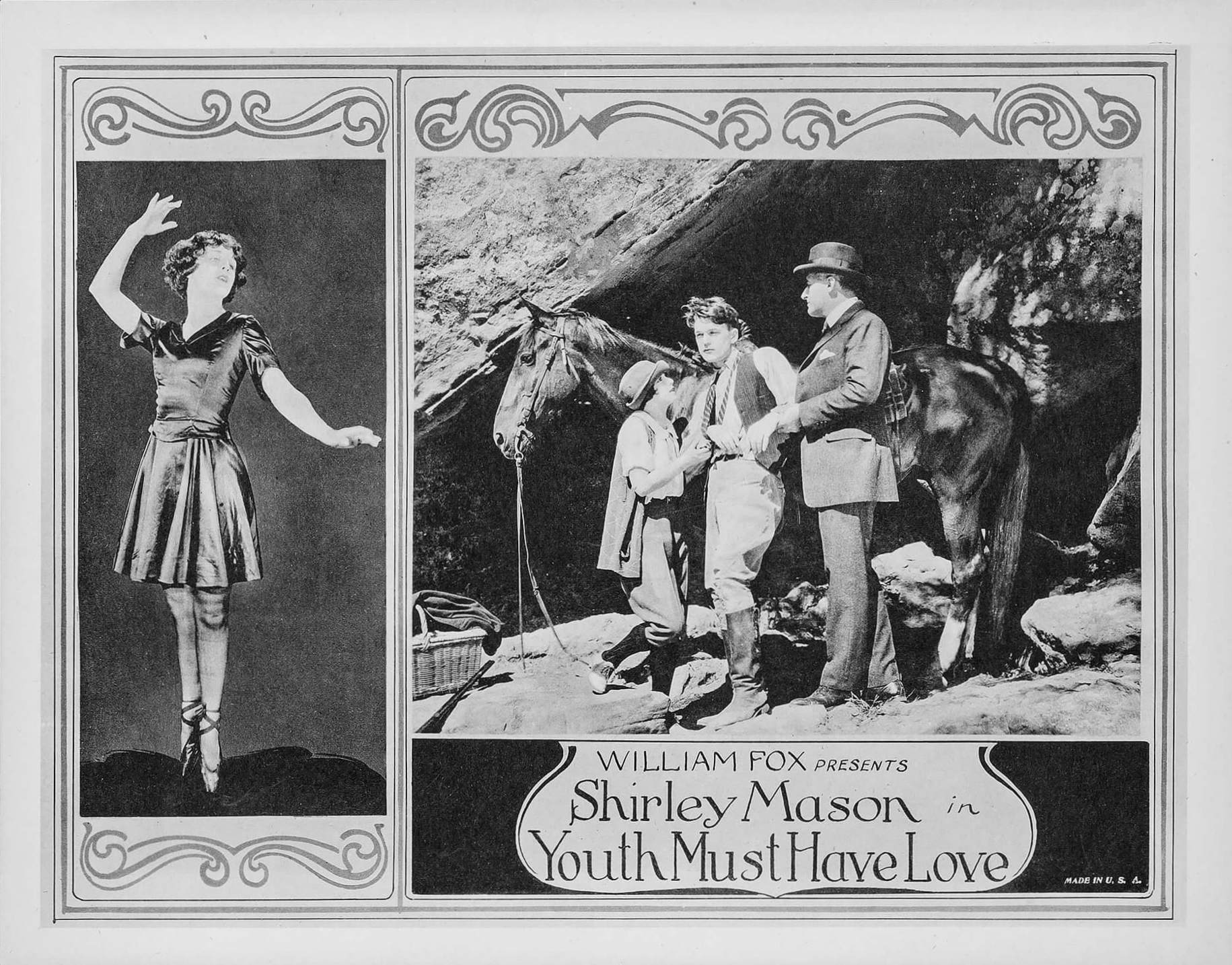
- Lobby card
- Directed by: Joseph Franz
- Screenplay by: Dorothy Yost; Paul Schofield
- Story by: Dorothy Yost
- Starring: Shirley Mason; Cecil Van Auker; Wallace MacDonald; Landers Stevens; Clarence Wilson
- Cinematography: George Schneiderman
- Production company: Fox Film Corporation
- Distributed by: Fox Film Corporation
- Release date: October 1, 1922
- Running time: 50 minutes
- Country: United States
- Language: Silent (English intertitles)

Youth Must Have Love is a 1922 American drama film directed by Joseph Franz and written by Dorothy Yost and Paul Schofield. The film stars Shirley Mason, Cecil Van Auker, Wallace MacDonald, Landers Stevens, and Clarence Wilson. The film was released on October 1, 1922, by Fox Film Corporation.

== Cast ==
- Shirley Mason as Della Marvin
- Cecil Van Auker as Marvin
- Wallace MacDonald as Earl Stannard
- Landers Stevens as Frank Hibbard
- Clarence Wilson as Austin Hibbard
