= A Sage Brush Hamlet =

1919 film

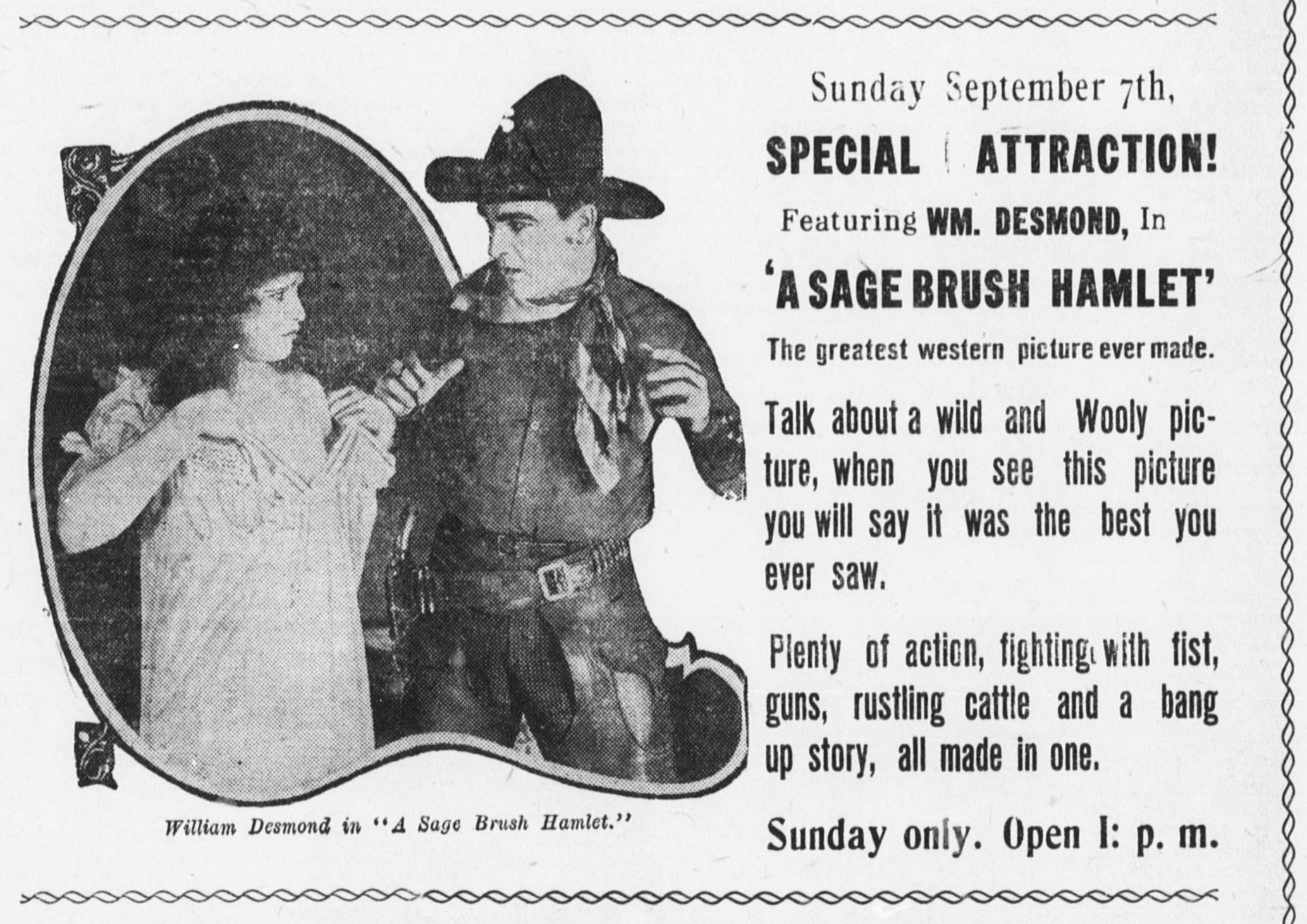
- Contemporary advertisement
- Directed by: Joseph J. Franz
- Written by: George Elwood Jenks
- Produced by: Jesse D. Hampton
- Starring: William Desmond; Florence Gibson; Edward Piel
- Production company: Jesse D. Hampton Productions
- Distributed by: Robertson-Cole
- Release date: August 3, 1919 (US)
- Running time: 5 reels
- Country: United States
- Languages: Silent; English intertitles

A Sage Brush Hamlet is a 1919 American silent Western film directed by Joseph J. Franz and written by Rex Taylor and Irma Whipley Taylor. It stars William Desmond, Florence Gibson, and Edward Piel.

== Cast list ==
- William Desmond as Larry Lang
- Florence Gibson as Mother Dolan
- Edward Piel as Claude Dutton
- Frank Lanning as Two-Gun Dan
- Walter Perry as Sheriff John Doe
- Harrish Ingraham as Mister Blank
- Marguerite De La Motte as Dora Lawrence
- George Fields as Pedro
- Bill Patton as Larry's pal
- Rosalie Sershon as Rosa O'Flynn

== Preservation ==
Two reels of A Sage Brush Hamlet were among the over 500 reels of film discovered in the Dawnson Film Find. The reels are held by Library and Archives Canada.
