= Fred Gamble (actor) =

American actor

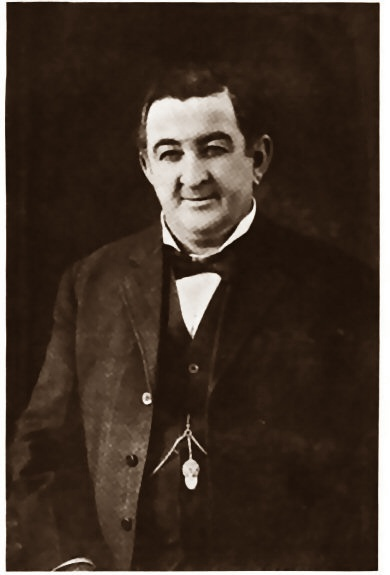
- Who's Who in the Film World, 1914
- Born: Fred Alvin Gambold; October 26, 1868; Indianapolis, Indiana, US
- Died: February 17, 1939 (aged 70); Hollywood, California, US
- Other names: Fred Gambold
- Occupation: Actor
- Years active: 1913–1928

Fred Gamble (born Fred Alvin Gambold, October 26, 1868 – February 17, 1939) was an American film actor. He appeared in more than 130 films between 1913 and 1928. He was sometimes billed as Fred Gambold.

== Biography ==
Gamble was born in Indianapolis, Indiana. At age 15, he left his home to join a minstrel show, beginning his career as an entertainer. He performed in vaudeville as a member of the Queen City Four and acted in stock theater. In 1912 he became a part of the American Film Company.

On February 17, 1939, Gamble died in Hollywood, California, at 70.

== Partial filmography ==
- Susie's New Shoes (1914)
- A Broadway Scandal (1918)
- The Woman Under Cover (1919)
- Homespun Folks (1920)
- The Screaming Shadow (1920)
- Bullet Proof (1920)
- Love Never Dies (1921)
- Golf (1922)
- Boy Crazy (1922)
- The Firebrand (1922)
- Black Oxen (1923)
- The Tornado (1924)
- A Woman of the World (1925)
- Tumbleweeds (1925)
- Tonio, Son of the Sierras (1925)
- Chasing Trouble (1926)
- Born to Battle (1926)
- The Blackbird (1926)
- The Red Mill (1927)
- The Fighting Stallion (1927)
- Laddie Be Good (1928)
