= Vanishing Trails =

1920 film

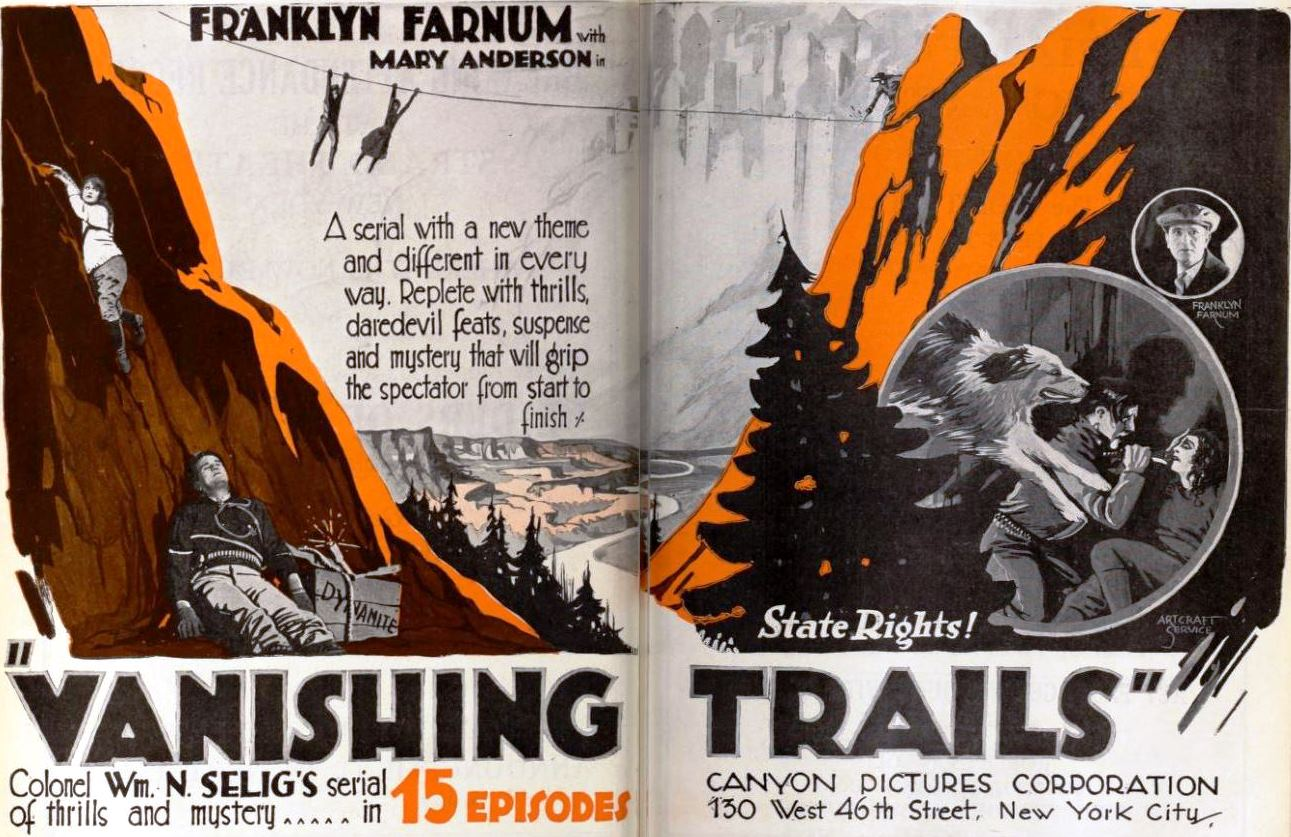
- Contemporary advertisement
- Directed by: Leon De La Mothe
- Produced by: William Nicholas Selig
- Starring: Franklyn Farnum; Mary Anderson
- Production company: Canyon Films
- Distributed by: Aywon Pictures
- Release date: September 1920
- Running time: 15 episodes
- Country: United States
- Languages: Silent; English intertitles

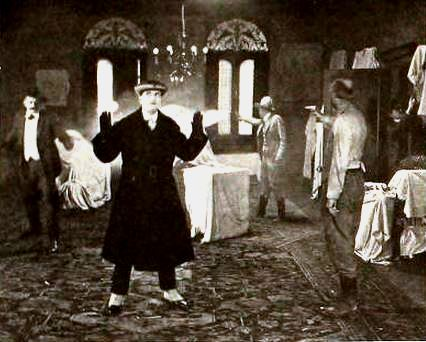
Scene from the film.

Vanishing Trails is a 1920 American silent Western film serial directed by Leon De La Mothe. The film is considered to be lost.

== Plot ==
As described in a summary in a film publication, the serial involves the mystery of the murder of William Stillman (Wells) and the finding of the heir to his fortune. Silent Joe (Farnum) arrives in an effort to discover the murderer and prove that he is the true heir. He and the heroine Lou (Anderson) have their adventures in the mountainous terrain with its "vanishing trails." They are aided by The Shadow (Orlamond), a demented scientist with his trained dog, and several remarkable, death-dealing inventions.

== Cast ==
- Franklyn Farnum as Silent Joe
- Mary Anderson as Durant's Daughter, Lou
- L. M. Wells as William Stillman
- Duke R. Lee as Steve Durant
- Harry Lonsdale as Grandon
- Vester Pegg as Rankin
- William Orlamond as The Shadow
- Pedro León as Bully Drake
- Bud Osborne as Skip Brandt

== See also ==
- List of film serials
- List of film serials by studio
- List of lost films
