= Tracks (1922 film) =

1922 film

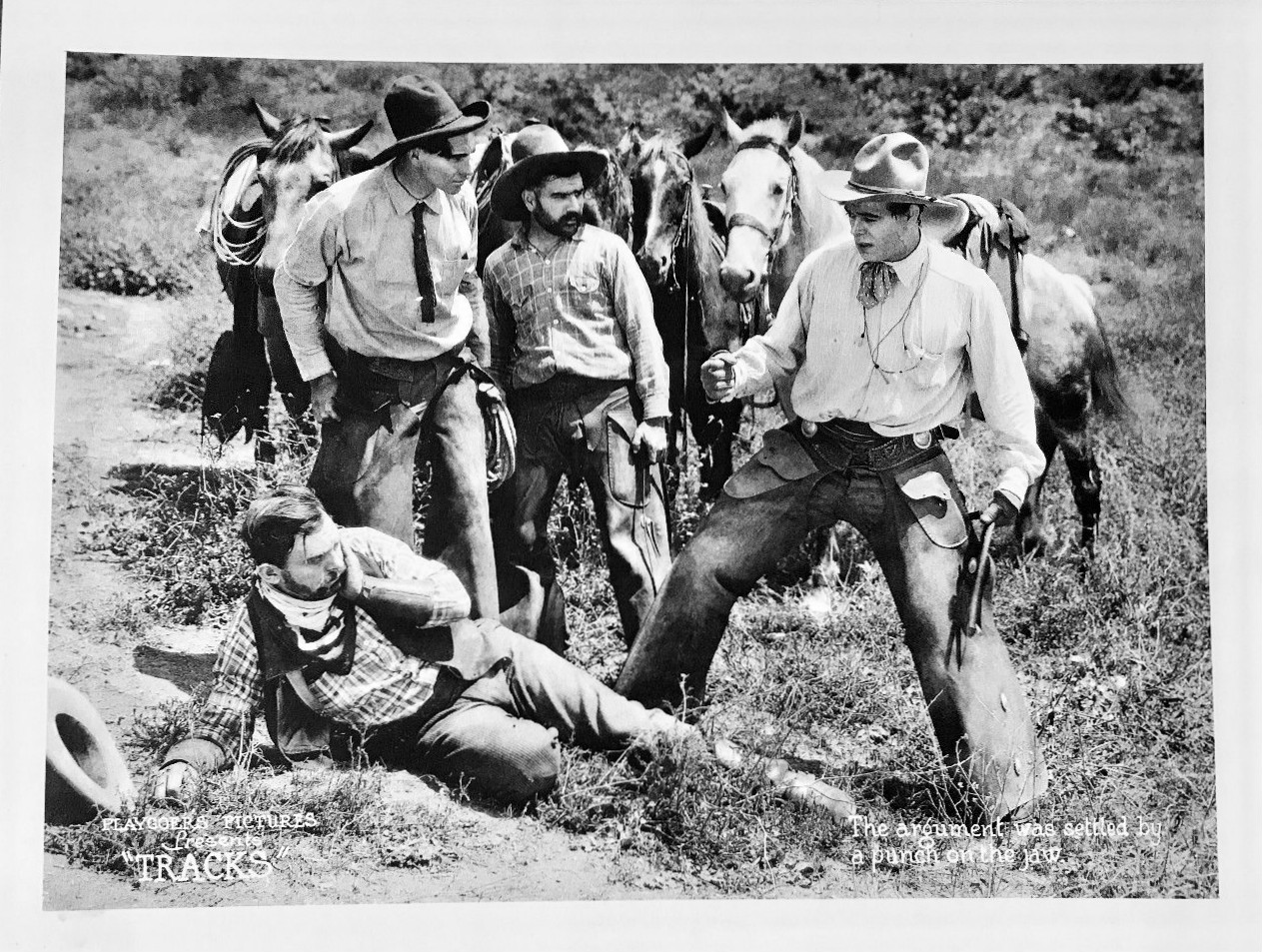
- Lobby card for Tracks.
- Directed by: Joseph J. Franz
- Written by: L. V. Jefferson; Mark Noble
- Starring: Bill Patton; George Berrell; François Dumas
- Cinematography: George Barney
- Production company: Western Pictures
- Distributed by: Pathé Exchange
- Release date: May 7, 1922 (US)
- Running time: 6 reels
- Country: United States
- Languages: Silent; English intertitles

Tracks is a 1922 American silent Western film directed by Joseph J. Franz and written by L. V. Jefferson and Mark Noble. The film stars Bill Patton, George Berrell, and François Dumas.

== Cast ==
- Bill Patton as Norman Draper
- George Berrell as Phillip Carlson
- François Dumas as Marcos Valverde
- Beatrice Burnham as Elicia
- Noble Johnson as Leon Serrano
- J. Farrell MacDonald as Jack Bess
