= Ashton Stevens =

American journalist

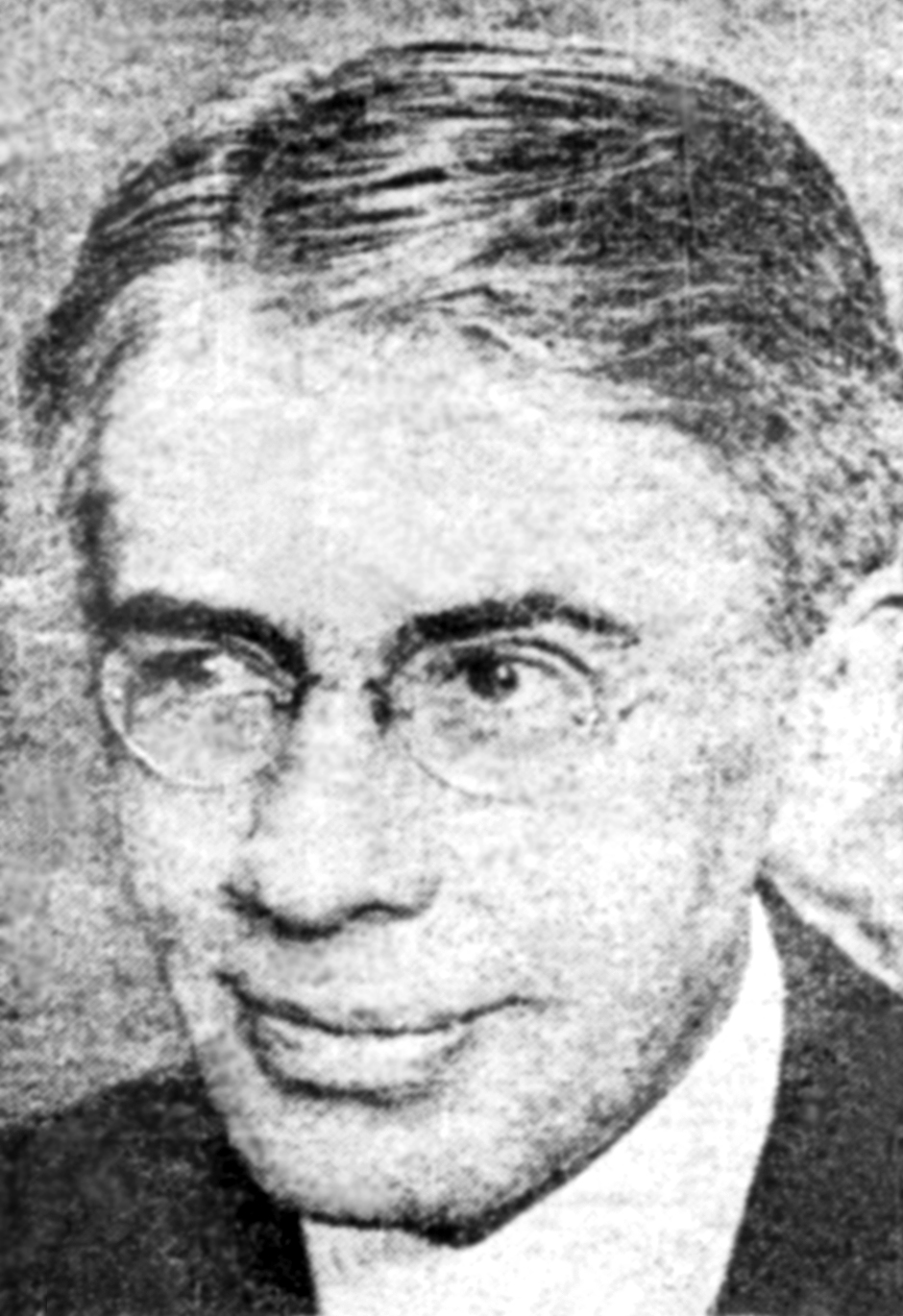
- Ashton Stevens in 1920
- Born: August 11, 1872; San Francisco, California
- Died: July 12, 1951 (aged 78); Chicago, Illinois
- Occupations: Drama critic Arts journalist
- Years active: 1894–1951
- Spouse(s): Aleece Uhlorn (1900–1926); Florence Katherine Krug (1927–1951)
- Relatives: George Stevens (nephew)

Ashton P. Stevens (August 11, 1872 – July 12, 1951) was an American journalist regarded as the dean of American drama critics. His newspaper column appeared in The San Francisco Examiner and later in the Chicago Herald-American. He was a theater critic for the Hearst Newspapers for 50 years, 40 of them in Chicago.

== Life and career ==
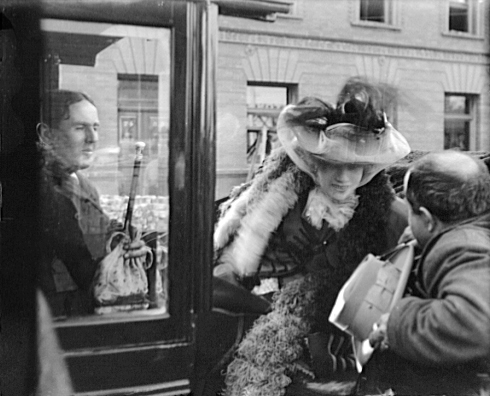
In April 1906 Ashton Stevens (left) escorted actress Sarah Bernhardt through the ruins of San Francisco after the earthquake and fire Photograph by Arnold Genthe

Ashton Stevens was born in San Francisco, California, the son of Hannah L. and James W. Stevens. He was the brother of actor John Landers Stevens and uncle of Jack Landers Stevens and George Stevens, director of such films as Shane, Giant and The Greatest Story Ever Told. He was the great-granduncle of producer-director Michael Stevens and granduncle of producer George Stevens, Jr.

Stevens began his journalism career in 1894 in San Francisco, as theatre reporter for the San Francisco News Letter. He started working for William Randolph Hearst's San Francisco Examiner in 1897, and went to work at the New York Evening Journal in 1907. In 1910 he moved to Chicago as drama critic for The Chicago Examiner and the Chicago Herald-American.

Stevens was regarded the dean of American play reviewers and drama critics, and was friend and confidante of many prominent playwrights and stage performers. Known for his sharp wit and fair criticism, he once wrote that "critics should write about plays and playwrights as they would about the weather, with hardly any regard for the weather's feelings."

An expert banjo player, Stevens defended its integrity as an instrument and wrote the Encyclopædia Britannica article on the subject. In 1923 his book Actorviews: Intimate Portraits, a collection of his feature interviews illustrated by Gene Markey, was published by Covici-McGee. Stevens wrote a number of plays, including Prospect Avenue and, with Franklin D. Roosevelt's ghostwriter Charles Michaelson, a comedy titled Mary's Way Out.

One of Stevens's close friends in Chicago was Dr. Maurice Bernstein, guardian of Orson Welles. Welles told filmmaker Peter Bogdanovich that the character of Jedediah Leland, played by Joseph Cotten in his 1941 film Citizen Kane, was modeled on Ashton Stevens:

Jed was really based on a close childhood friend of mine — George Stevens' uncle Ashton Stevens. He was practically my uncle, too. … I sent him the script before we began, of course, and while he was visiting me on the Coast, I brought him to the set during shooting. Later he saw the movie and thought the old man would be thrilled by it. As it turned out, after Kane was released, Ashton was forbidden by his Hearst editors to even mention my name. … Ashton was really one of the great ones. The last of the dandies — he worked for Hearst for some 50 years or so, and adored him. A gentleman … very much like Jed.

Stevens's first wife, Aleece Uhlorn, was a daughter of a San Francisco banker and the sister of novelist Gertrude Atherton. They were married in 1900 or on December 4, 1901; she died in 1926. The following year Stevens married actress Florence Katherine Krug, known thereafter as Kay Ashton-Stevens.

Stevens was in poor health in his later years, but continued to write regularly for The Herald-American. He died of a heart attack at his home in Chicago July 12, 1951. His papers were bequeathed to the Newberry Library in Chicago.
