= Landers Stevens =

American actor

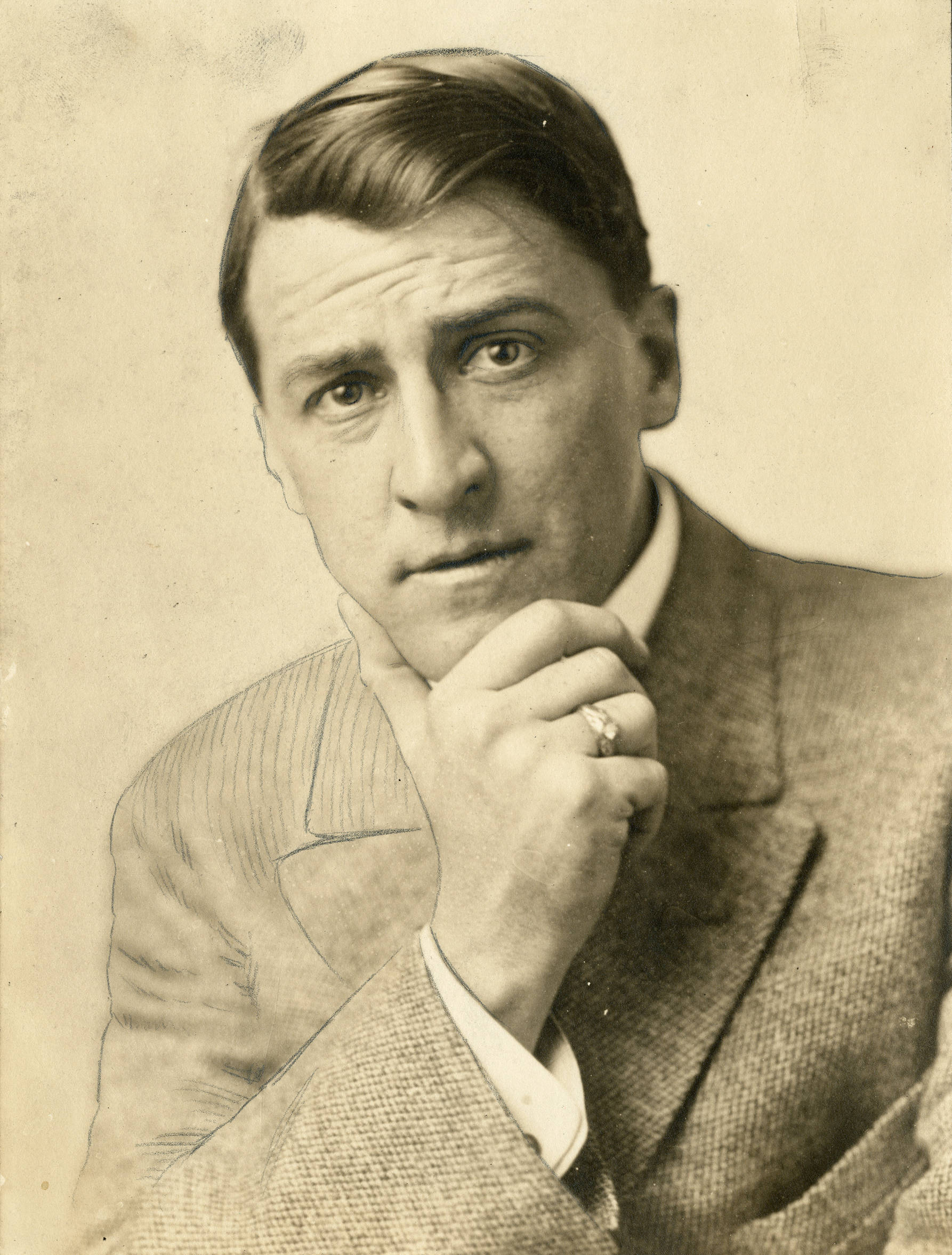
- Stevens in 1914
- Born: John Landers Stevens; February 17, 1877; San Francisco, California, United States
- Died: December 19, 1940 (aged 63); Los Angeles, California, United States
- Occupation: Actor
- Years active: 1920–1940 (film)
- Children: George Stevens, Jack Stevens
- Relatives: Ashton Stevens (brother)

John Landers Stevens (1877–1940) was an American stage and film actor. A character actor he appeared in prominent screen roles in the early 1920s before switching to smaller supporting parts, often authority figures, in the following decade. He was the brother of the journalist Ashton Stevens and the father of film director George Stevens. He appeared in the 1936 musical film Swing Time directed by his son. His final screen appearance was in Citizen Kane.

== Early years ==
Stevens was born on February 17, 1877, in San Francisco. He came from a theatrical family, and his brother, Ashton, became a drama critic in San Francisco and later in Chicago.

== Career ==
After having acted with an amateur company, Stevens directed plays at the Majestic theater.

== Personal life and death ==
Landers married actress Fanny Gillette on April 15, 1896, in San Francisco. They were divorced on April 28, 1903. He married actress Georgie Cooper in San Jose, California, on April 29, 1903. They had two sons, film producer and director George Stevens and cameraman Jack Stevens. He died in Hollywood Hospital on December 19, 1940, aged 63.

== Selected filmography ==
- The Price of Redemption (1920)
- A Thousand to One (1920)
- Keeping Up with Lizzie (1921)
- Shadows of Conscience (1921)
- The Veiled Woman (1922)
- Wild Honey (1922)
- Handle with Care (1922)
- A Wonderful Wife (1922)
- Youth Must Have Love (1922)
- Battling Bunyan (1924)
- Frozen Justice (1929)
- The Trial of Mary Dugan (1929)
- The Gorilla (1930)
- Little Caesar (1931)
- The Rainbow Trail (1932)
- Hell Divers (1932)
- Midshipman Jack (1933)
- After Tonight (1933)
- Bachelor Bait (1934)
- Elinor Norton (1934)
- The Great Hotel Murder (1935)
- Romance in Manhattan (1935)
- Thunder in the Night (1935)
- Charlie Chan's Secret (1936)
- Postal Inspector (1936)
- Educating Father (1936)
- Gentle Julia (1936)
- The Cowboy Star (1936)
- Swing Time (1936)
- Bill Cracks Down (1937)
- We Who Are About to Die (1937)
- Join the Marines (1937)
- The Zero Hour (1939)
- Rio (1939)
- The Lone Wolf Spy Hunt (1939)
- Mr. Smith Goes to Washington (1939)
- Cross-Country Romance (1939)
- The Story of Alexander Graham Bell (1939)
- Danger on Wheels (1940)
- Citizen Kane (1941)

== Bibliography ==
- Green, Stanley. Hollywood Musicals Year by Year. Hal Leonard Corporation, 1999.
- Moss, Marilyn Ann. Giant: George Stevens, a Life on Film. Terrace Books, 2015.
