= The Firebrand (1922 film) =

1922 film

- Directed by: Alan James
- Produced by: Phil Goldstone
- Starring: Franklyn Farnum; Ruth Langdon; Fred Gamble
- Cinematography: Edgar Lyons
- Production company: Phil Goldstone Productions
- Release date: December 15, 1922 (US)
- Running time: 5 reels
- Country: United States
- Languages: Silent; English intertitles

The Firebrand is a 1922 American silent Western film directed by Alan James. The film stars Franklyn Farnum, Ruth Langdon, and Fred Gamble.

== Plot ==
Bill Holt is a homesteader, also known as a "nester", who battles his neighbors and cattle rustlers in order to keep his home. He helps the local sheriff capture a band of rustlers by forcing them down a well, where he keeps them trapped until the sheriff arrives. He also has the last laugh on his main antagonist, Judd Acker, when he finally reveals that he is married to Acker's daughter, Alice.

== Cast ==
- Franklyn Farnum as Bill Holt
- Ruth Langdon as Alice Acker
- Fred Gamble as Judd Acker
- Pat Harmon as Hank Potter
- William Berke as Sheriff Harding
- Tex Keith as Buck Knowles

== Reception ==
Moving Picture World gave the film a good review, saying that it was nice mix of melodrama and comedy, with good action sequences, and beautiful exteriors. Motion Picture News also gave the film a positive review, "'The Firebrand' is a peppery western which moves along at creditable speed, maintaining the interest not so much through the plot which is rather old, but through several original twists which are revealed occasionally." They complimented the directing and production values, as well as the acting.
