= Flashing Steeds =

1925 film

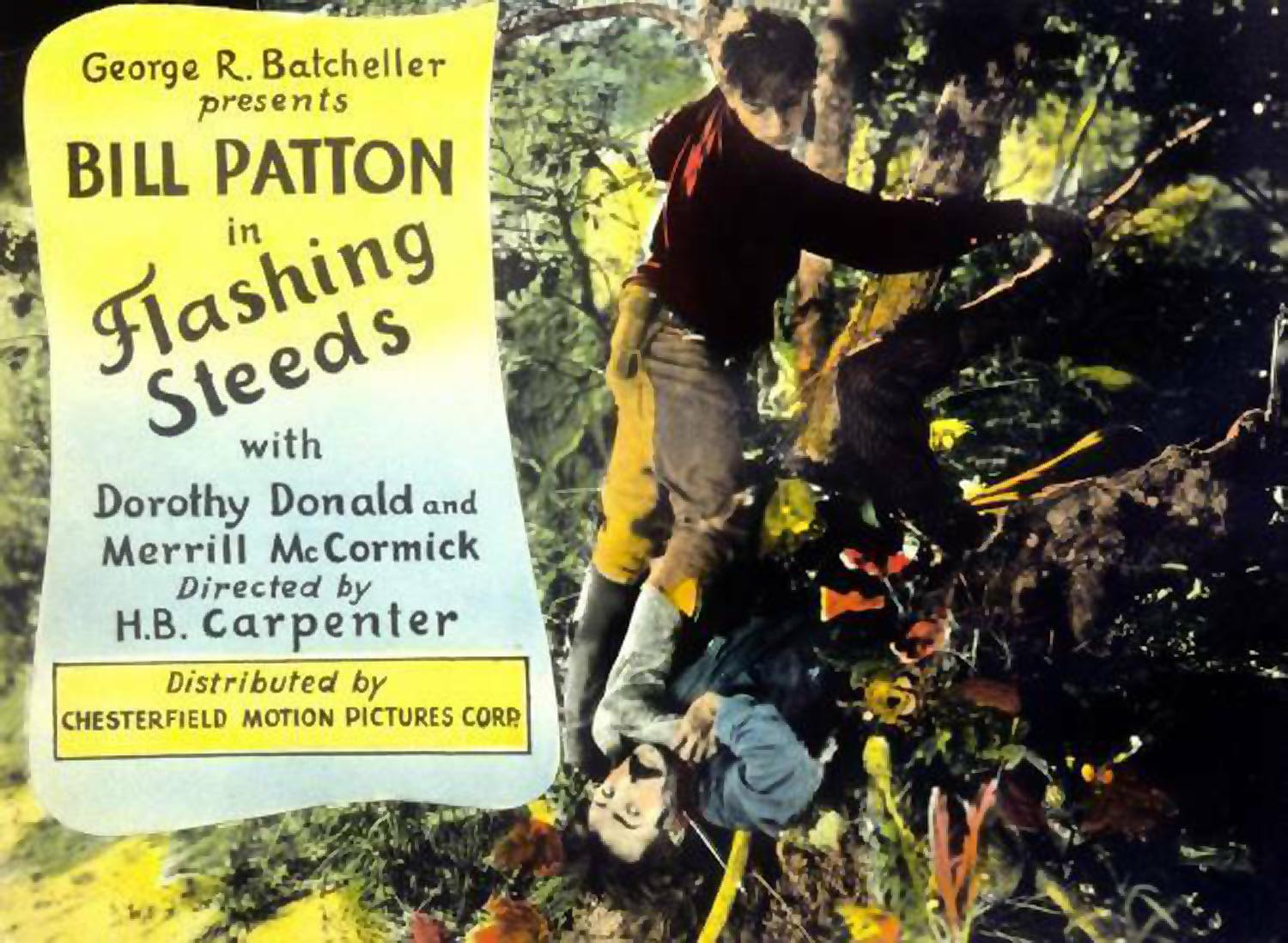
- Directed by: Horace B. Carpenter
- Written by: Horace B. Carpenter
- Produced by: George R. Batcheller
- Starring: Bill Patton; Dorothy Donald; Merrill McCormick
- Cinematography: Paul H. Allen
- Production company: Chesterfield Pictures
- Distributed by: Chesterfield Pictures
- Release date: October 1, 1925 (U.S.)
- Running time: 57 minutes
- Country: United States
- Language: Silent (English intertitles)

Flashing Steeds is a 1925 American silent Western film directed by Horace B. Carpenter and starring Bill Patton, Dorothy Donald, and Merrill McCormick.

== Plot ==
As described in a film magazine review, Bill Swift goes to work on Captain Randall's ranch, and finds that he is in love with Randall's daughter Helen. Randall, a former sailor, possesses a valuable black pearl. Lord and Lady Rathburne visit the ranch. They are really international thieves, working with confederates to obtain the Randall pearl. Bill gains the crook's confidence and thus is able to thwart their scheme. He finally rounds up the gang, reveals that he is a government agent, and marries Helen.

== Cast ==
- Bill Patton as Bill Swift
- Dorothy Donald as Helen Randall
- Merrill McCormick as Lord Algernon Rathburne
- Ethel Childers as Lady Rathburne
- Alfred Hewston as 'Shorty' Travers
- Dick La Reno as Captain Randall
- Harry O'Connoras Joe Stern
- Pat Patton as One Lung, the cook

== Bibliography ==
- Pitts, Michael R. Western Movies: A Guide to 5,105 Feature Films. McFarland, 2012.
