= George F. Marion =

American actor (1860–1945)

George F. Marion, Sr.
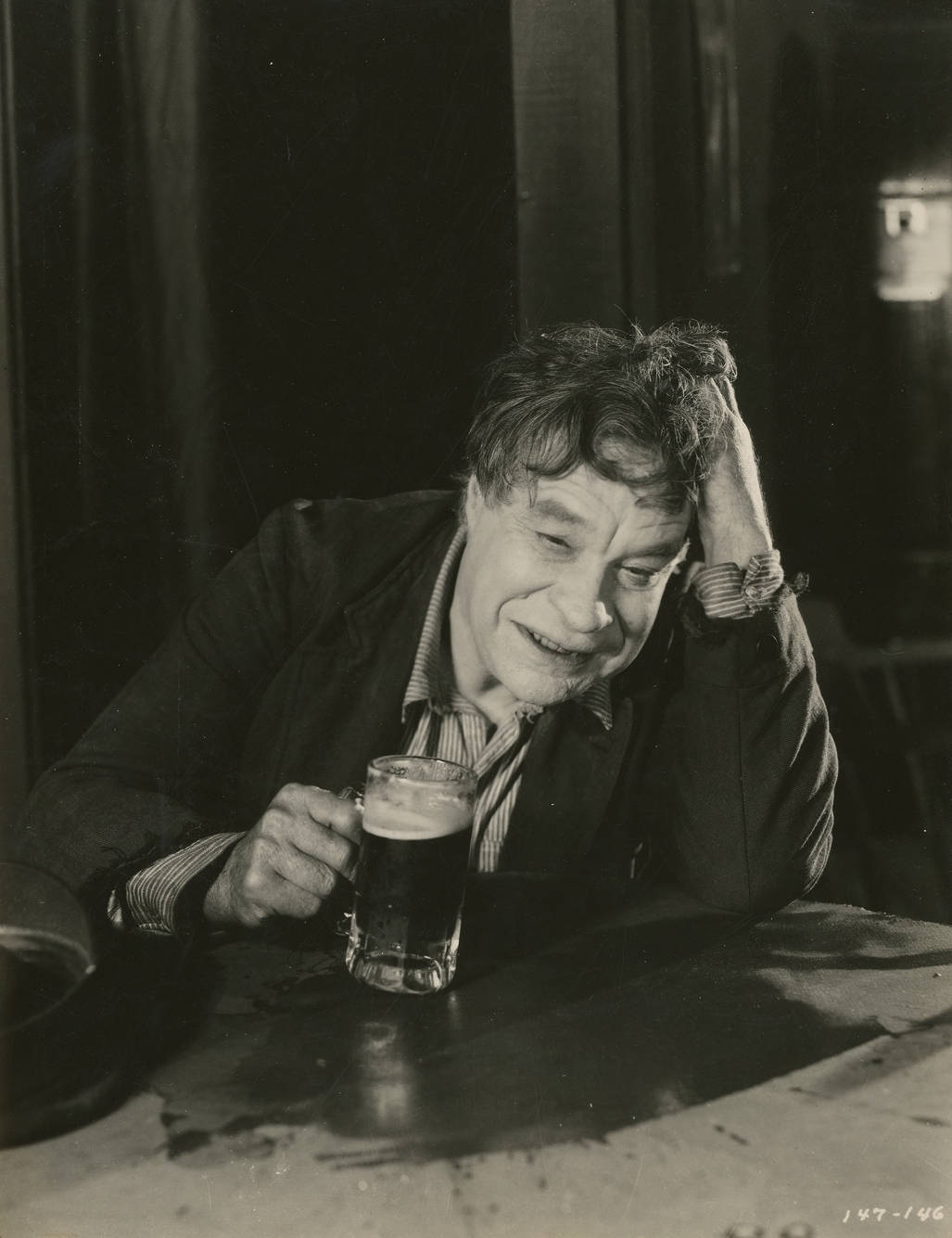
- George Marion in 1923
- Born: George Francis Marion; July 16, 1860; San Francisco, California, U.S.
- Died: November 30, 1945 (aged 85); Carmel, California, U.S.
- Occupations: Actor; director
- Years active: 1915–1935
- Spouses: Lillian E. Swain (m. 1894, divorced) Agnes E. Daly (m. 1896)
- Children: 3, including George Marion, Jr.

George Francis Marion Sr. (July 16, 1860 – November 30, 1945) was an American film and stage actor and director, known for Anna Christie, both (1923) and (1930), and Death from a Distance (1935). Marion acted in 35 films between 1915 and 1935.

== Early life ==
George F. Marion was born on July 16, 1860, in San Francisco, California, USA as George Francis Marion.

== Career ==
Marion directed and starred as Count Cassibianca in The Little Duchess in 1901. He directed the 1904 musical Higgledy-Piggledy. He was in the Broadway production of Anna Christie (1921) of Pauline Lord and the two film versions of Anna Christie of Blanche Sweet (1923 silent) and Greta Garbo (1930 talkie).

== Personal life and death ==
Marion was married to actress Lillian E. Swain in 1894 and later to Agnes E. Daly in 1896. He died of a heart attack in Carmel, California in 1945, at the age of 85. His son George Marion, Jr. was a famous Hollywood screenwriter.

== Partial filmography ==
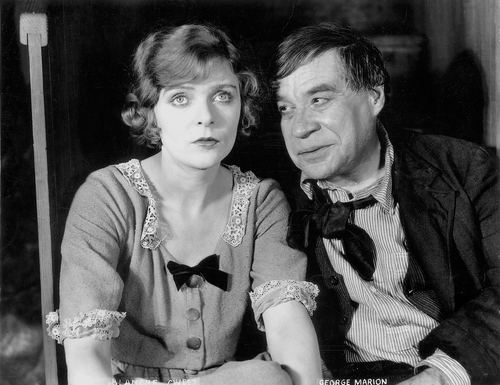
Blanche Sweet and George F. Marion in Anna Christie (1923)

- Excuse Me (1915) - Porter
- Madame X (1916, director)
- Luke Wins Ye Ladye Faire (1917, Short)
- Go Straight (1921) - Jim Boyd
- Gun Shy (1922) - The Undertaker
- The Girl I Loved (1923) - The Judge
- A Million to Burn (1923) - Old Ben Marlowe
- Anna Christie (1923) - Chris Christopherson
- The Untameable (1923) - Old Man
- Bringin' Home the Bacon (1924) - Noel Simms
- On the Go (1925) - Eb Moots
- Straight Through (1925) - Parson Sanderson
- The White Monkey (1925) - Soames Forsyte
- Clothes Make the Pirate (1925) - Jennison
- Tumbleweeds (1925) - Old Man
- Skinner's Dress Suit (1926) - Old Man on Bench (uncredited)
- The Highbinders (1926) - Wadsworth Ladd
- The Wise Guy (1926) - Horace Palmer
- Rolling Home (1926) - Selectman
- The Gypsy Romance (1926) - Old Man playing Old Gypsy Woman
- Loco Luck (1927) - 'Dad' Perkins (postmaster)
- The King of Kings (1927) - (uncredited)
- Skedaddle Gold (1927) - George F.
- A Texas Steer (1927) - Fishback
- Evangeline (1929) - René La Blanc
- The Isle of Lost Ships (1929) - Old Sea Captain (uncredited)
- The Bishop Murder Case (1929) - Adolph Drukker
- Anna Christie (1930) - Chris Christopherson
- The Big House (1930) - Pop
- The Sea Bat (1930) - Antone
- The Pay-Off (1930) - Mouse
- A Lady's Morals (1930) - Innkeeper
- Man to Man (1930) - Jim McCord - Banker
- Hook, Line and Sinker (1930) - the bellboy of the hotel Ritz de la Riviera
- Laughing Sinners (1931) - Humpty
- Six Hours to Live (1932) - Prof. Otto Bauer
- Her First Mate (1933) - Sam
- Port of Lost Dreams (1934) - Capt. Morgan Rock
- Rocky Mountain Mystery (1935) - James Ballard
- Death from a Distance (1935) - Jim Gray
- Metropolitan (1935) - Papa Perontelli (final film role)
