= Horace B. Carpenter =

American actor (1875–1945)

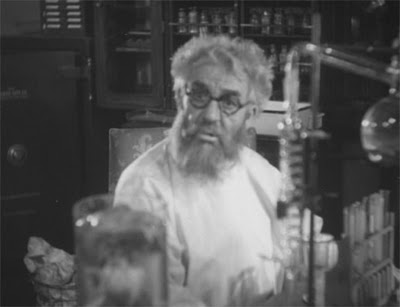
- as Dr. Meirschultz in Maniac (1934)
- Born: January 31, 1875; Grand Rapids, Michigan, US
- Died: May 21, 1945 (aged 70); Hollywood, California, US
- Occupation(s): Actor; Film director Screenwriter
- Years active: 1914–1945

Horace B. Carpenter (January 31, 1875 – May 21, 1945) was an American actor, film director, and screenwriter. He appeared in more than 330 films between 1914 and 1945. He also directed 15 films between 1925 and 1934. Born in Grand Rapids, Michigan, Carpenter died in Hollywood, California, from a heart attack.

== Selected filmography ==
=== Actor ===
- The Man on the Box (1914)
- The Call of the North (1914)
- The Virginian (1914)
- The Man from Home (1914)
- The Ghost Breaker (1914)
- The Goose Girl (1915)
- The Arab (1915)
- Carmen (1915)
- The Unknown (1915)
- The Golden Chance (1915)
- The Plow Girl (1916)
- The Sowers (1916)
- Maria Rosa (1916)
- Sweet Kitty Bellairs (1916)
- The Clown (1916)
- Common Ground (1916)
- The Heir to the Hoorah (1916)
- Joan the Woman (1916)
- Castles for Two (1917)
- Nan of Music Mountain (1917)
- The Devil-Stone (1917)
- Terror of the Range (1919)
- The Silent Stranger (1924)
- Vultures of the Sea (1928)
- Texas Tommy (1928)
- Bride of the Desert (1929)
- False Fathers (1929)
- West of the Rockies (1929)
- Trails of the Golden West (1931)
- Pueblo Terror (1931)
- Riders of the Rio (1931)
- Partners of the Trail (1931)
- Out of Singapore (1932)
- Riders of the Desert (1932)
- Outlaw Justice (1932)
- The Seventh Commandment (1932)
- Mark of the Spur (1932)
- Breed of the Border (1933)
- The Pecos Dandy (1934)
- Maniac (1934)
- The Man from Guntown (1935)
- Smokey Smith (1935)
- Where Trails End (1942)

=== Director ===
- Flashing Steeds (1925)
- Desperate Odds (1925)
- The Sagebrush Lady (1925)
- Fangs of Fate (1925)
- The Last Chance (1926)
- The Lovin' Fool (1926)
- Jus' Travlin (1927)
- False Fathers (1929)
- West of the Rockies (1929)
- The Pecos Dandy (1934)

=== Writer ===
- Wild and Woolly (Story, 1917)
- Fangs of Fate (1925)
- The Last Chance (1926)
- Bullets and Justice (Scenario, 1929)
- The Arizona Kid (Scenario, 1929)
- Fighters of the Saddle (Scenario, 1929)
