= The Last Chance (1926 film) =

1926 film

- Directed by: Horace B. Carpenter
- Written by: Horace B. Carpenter
- Produced by: George R. Batcheller; Horace B. Carpenter
- Starring: Bill Patton; Dorothy Donald; Merrill McCormick
- Cinematography: Paul H. Allen
- Production company: H.B. Carpenter Productions
- Distributed by: Chesterfield Pictures
- Release date: July 15, 1926
- Running time: 52 minutes
- Country: United States
- Languages: Silent; English intertitles

The Last Chance is a 1926 American silent Western film directed by Horace B. Carpenter and starring Bill Patton, Dorothy Donald and Merrill McCormick.

== Cast ==
- Bill Patton as Bill Dexter
- Dorothy Donald as Miss Stubbins
- Merrill McCormick as 'Black' Bart
- Harry O'Connor as Bill Stubbins
- Walter Patton as Postmaster
- Theodore Henderson as Sheriff
- Walter Blunt as Pete Walcolm

== Bibliography ==
- Connelly, Robert B. The Silents: Silent Feature Films, 1910-36, Volume 40, Issue 2. December Press, 1998.
- Munden, Kenneth White. The American Film Institute Catalog of Motion Pictures Produced in the United States, Part 1. University of California Press, 1997.
