= Death from a Distance =

1935 film by Frank R. Strayer

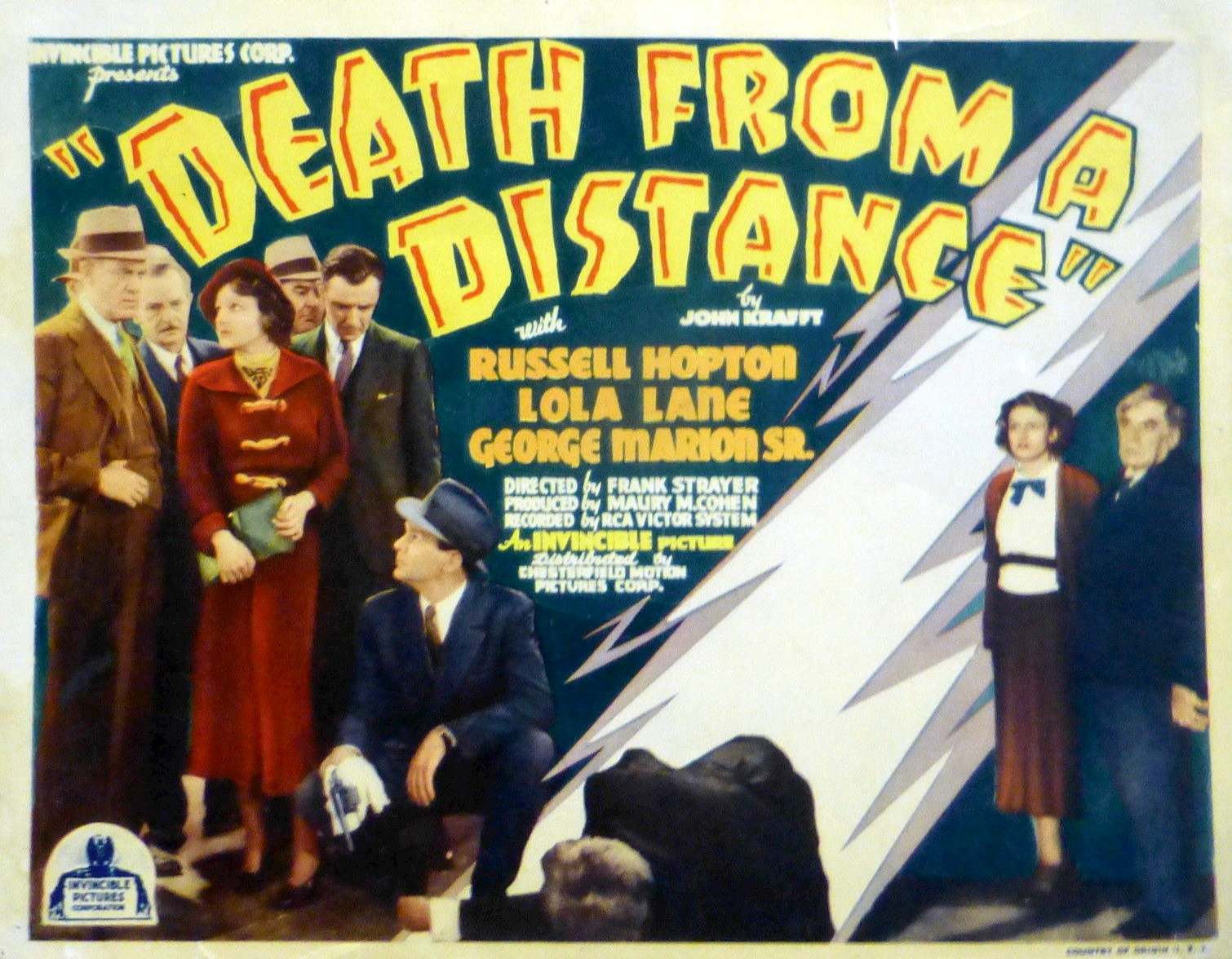
- Lobby card
- Directed by: Frank R. Strayer
- Written by: John W. Krafft
- Produced by: Maury M. Cohen
- Starring: Russell Hopton; Lola Lane; George F. Marion
- Cinematography: M. A. Anderson
- Edited by: Roland D. Reed
- Music by: Sidney Cutner
- Production company: Invincible Pictures
- Distributed by: Chesterfield Pictures
- Release date: September 17, 1935
- Running time: 68 minutes
- Country: United States
- Language: English

Death from a Distance is a 1935 American mystery film starring Russell Hopton and Lola Lane. Lane plays a young reporter who eventually combines forces with a detective played by Hopton to solve a murder-mystery. Directed by Frank R. Strayer, the film was produced by Maury M. Cohen. The film's sets were designed by the art director Edward C. Jewell.

It was the first feature film broadcast on U.S. commercial television, on July 2, 1941, during the first week of official commercial broadcasts on NBC's New York television station WNBT-TV.

== Plot summary ==
While a distinguished astronomer is giving a lecture in a planetarium, a shot rings out and one of the audience members is found dead. A tough detective and a brassy female reporter lock horns as they both try to break the case.

== Cast ==
- Russell Hopton as Det. Lt. Ted Mallory
- Lola Lane as Kay Palmer
- George F. Marion as Jim Gray
- Lee Kohlmar as Prof. Ernst Einfeld
- John St. Polis as Prof. Trowbridge
- Lew Kelly as Det. Regan
- E.H. Calvert as District Attorney
- Wheeler Oakman as Langsdale, aka George Fremont
- Robert Frazer as Morgan
- Cornelius Keefe as Clay Gorman
- John Davidson as Ahmad Haidru
- John Dilson as Newspaper Editor McConnell
- Herb Vigran as the Police Photographer
