= Beyond the Trail =

1926 film

- Directed by: Albert Herman
- Produced by: George R. Batcheller
- Starring: Bill Patton; Eric Mayne; Janet Dawn
- Edited by: Joe Rock; Sam Winston
- Production company: Sierra Pictures
- Distributed by: Chesterfield Pictures
- Release date: September 1, 1926
- Running time: 50 minutes
- Country: United States
- Languages: Silent; English intertitles

Beyond the Trail is a 1926 American silent Western film directed by Albert Herman and starring Bill Patton, Eric Mayne and Janet Dawn. A print of Beyond the Trail exists.

== Plot ==
Bill is a klutzy cowpoke who accidentally causes to two thieves to shoot each other. He is then assigned to bring in Foreman Cal, the thieving foreman. Bill and Cal fight for the affection of Mary, and Bill is victorious.

== Cast ==
- Bill Patton as Bill
- Eric Mayne as Ranch Owner
- Janet Dawn as Mary
- Sheldon Lewis as Foreman Cal
- Stuart Holmes as Archibald Van Jones
- Clara Horton as Clarabell Simpkins
- James F. Fulton as Buck
