= In Love with Life =

1934 film by Frank R. Strayer

- Directed by: Frank R. Strayer
- Written by: Robert Ellis (screenplay and dialogue)
- Produced by: George R. Batcheller; Maury M. Cohen
- Cinematography: M.A. Anderson
- Edited by: Roland D. Reed
- Distributed by: Chesterfield Motion Pictures Corporation
- Release date: May 12, 1934
- Running time: 66 minutes
- Country: United States
- Language: English

In Love with Life is a 1934 American pre-Code film directed by Frank R. Strayer.

== Plot summary ==
Sharon is a penniless widow, forced to seek help from her father, Morley, a wealthy financier, who didn't approve of her marriage. Morley agrees to take in his grandson, Laury, but declares Sharon can never see her son again.

Morley hires Professor John Applegate to tutor Laury. John secretly keeps Sharon informed of her son's welfare. When the stock market crashes Morley uses his own fortune to help his investors. John proposes to Sharon. Morley, now humbled by his financial loses, reconciles with his daughter.

== Production ==
The film was shot in Los Angeles, California. Twelve child performers from the Meglin School made appearances in the Kiddie Kabaret scenes.

== Cast ==
- Lila Lee as Sharon
- Dickie Moore as Laurence (Laury)
- Onslow Stevens as Professor John Applegate
- Claude Gillingwater as Morley
- Rosita Marstini as Brouquet
- Clarence Geldart as Barlow
- Tom Ricketts as Book Store Proprietor
