= Below the Deadline (1929 film) =

1929 film by J. P. McGowan

- Directed by: J.P. McGowan
- Written by: Lee Authmar; Arthur Hoerl
- Starring: Frank Leigh; Barbara Worth; Arthur Rankin
- Cinematography: M.A. Anderson; Jack Jackson
- Edited by: James Sweeney
- Production company: Chesterfield Pictures
- Distributed by: Chesterfield Pictures
- Release date: January 1, 1929
- Running time: 57 minutes
- Country: United States
- Languages: Silent; English intertitles

Below the Deadline is a 1929 American silent crime film directed by J.P. McGowan and starring Frank Leigh, Barbara Worth and Arthur Rankin.

== Cast ==
- Frank Leigh as Beau Nash
- Barbara Worth as Claire Byron
- Arthur Rankin as Jimmy Byron
- Walter Merrill as Donald Cornwall
- J.P. McGowan as Taggart
- Mike Donlin as Sandy
- Virginia Sale as Mother Biblow
- Lou Gory as Stella
- Bill Patton as Johnston
- Tiny Ward as Tubby
- Charles H. Hickman as Police Captain
- Fred Walton as Festenberg

== Bibliography ==
- Michael R. Pitts. Poverty Row Studios, 1929-1940: An Illustrated History of 55 Independent Film Companies, with a Filmography for Each. McFarland & Company, 2005.
