= Union Glass Company =

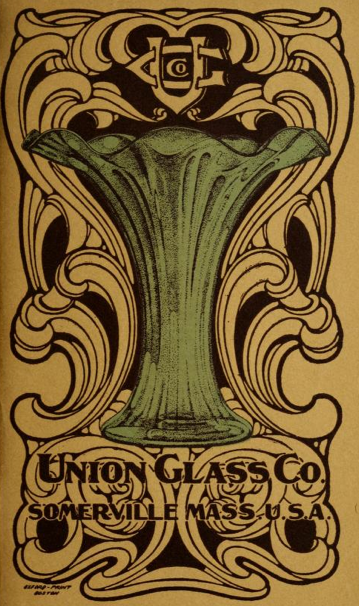
Union Glass Company catalog, circa 1911

The Union Glass Company was an American glass manufacturer located at 52 Webster Avenue, Somerville, Massachusetts, and active from 1854 until 1924. It manufactured a full line of flint glass products during its existence, and art glass (mostly iridescent) from 1892 onwards.

== History ==
The Union Glass Company was established by Amory Houghton (1812–1882), of Cambridge's Houghton family, who had previously in 1851 invested in a fledgling glass works started by Mason W. Teasdale and Norman S. Cate. This company, until then known as Cate & Phillips, was renamed the Bay State Glass Company, and produced a variety of flint (lead) glassware from lamps to flasks.

In January 1854, Houghton liquidated his holdings in Bay State Glass to start his own flint glass factory in Somerville, which he named the Union Glass Company It housed two nine-pot furnaces, with each clay pot holding over three thousand pounds of molten glass. The crown furnaces were coal-fired. In its early years, the Union Glass Company manufactured a wide range of flint glass products including lamps, lamp trimmings, bottles, windows, lenses, and tableware. It employed 20 to 40 men ( one who was a very famous paper weight maker and glass blower was Philip Buonomo of Somerville, who was one of the best workers. Who also managed the company until it closed.

However, during the winter of 1857–58, the company suffered severely amid a nationwide financial crisis. In 1860–61 it fell into insolvency and was reorganized and reopened as The Union Glass Works. By August 1864, the Houghton family had sold its entire interest in Union Glass to K.S. Chaffee. They subsequently purchased one of New York's most reputable glass factories, the Brooklyn Flint Glass Works. After it too proved financially unsuccessful, in 1868 Houghton moved again to Corning, New York to start the Corning Flint Glass Works, which eventually flourished as Corning Inc.

With Chaffee as president and treasurer, the firm's original name of Union Glass Company was restored. In 1893, control passed to Julian de Cordova, who operated the plant until its 1924 closing.

== Sources ==
- The Union Glass Company, Somerville, Mass., 1854–1927, Lillian G. Pattinson, 39 pages, 1960.
- Art glass of Union Glass Company, Somerville, Massachusetts (1893–1927), Kelly Ann Conway, 120 pages, 2005. Thesis/Dissertation.
- "Yankee Enterprise! The Houghtons of Massachusetts & the Rise and Fall of 'Corning Incorporated', 1851–1871", Jeffrey J. Matthews, Essays in Economic and Business History, 2002.
- Alanson B. Houghton: Ambassador of the New Era, Jeffrey J. Matthews, Rowman & Littlefield Publishers, 2004. ISBN 978-0-8420-5050-0
- The Grove Encyclopedia of Decorative Arts, ed. Gordon Campbell, Volume 1, p. 501, Oxford University Press, 2006. ISBN 978-0-19-518948-3
