= Port of Lost Dreams =

1934 film by Frank R. Strayer

- Directed by: Frank R. Strayer
- Written by: Charles Belden; Robert Ellis
- Produced by: Maury M. Cohen
- Starring: William Boyd; Lola Lane; George F. Marion
- Cinematography: M. A. Anderson
- Edited by: Roland D. Reed
- Production company: Invincible Pictures
- Distributed by: Chesterfield Pictures
- Release date: October 15, 1934
- Running time: 71 minutes
- Country: United States
- Language: English

Port of Lost Dreams is a 1934 American drama film directed by Frank R. Strayer and starring William Boyd, Lola Lane and George F. Marion.

== Plot ==
A gangster's girlfriend on the run from the police, who suspect her of helping her boyfriend commit a robbery, holes up in a waterfront bar. She stows away on a fishing boat headed out to sea, and winds up falling in love with and marrying one of the fishermen, but doesn't tell him about her past. However, a year after they're married and have a child, her ex-boyfriend gets out of jail and comes looking for her.

== Cast ==
- William Boyd as Lars Christensen
- Lola Lane as Molly Deshon / Molly Clark Christensen
- George F. Marion as Capt. Morgan Rock
- Edward Gargan as Porky the Freda's 'Crew'
- Harold Huber as Louis Constolos
- Robert Elliott as Lt. Andersen
- Evelyn Carter Carrington as Mother McGee, Bar Owner
- Charles C. Wilson as Warden
- Robert Frazer as Radio Announcer
- Lafe McKee as Justice of the Peace
- Lew Kelly as First Hospital Detective
- Eddie Phillips as Constolos' Lawyer

== Bibliography ==
- Michael R. Pitts. Poverty Row Studios, 1929–1940: An Illustrated History of 55 Independent Film Companies, with a Filmography for Each. McFarland & Company, 2005.
