= Fangs of Fate (1925 film) =

1925 film

- Directed by: Horace B. Carpenter
- Written by: Horace B. Carpenter
- Produced by: Horace B. Carpenter
- Starring: Bill Patton; Dorothy Donald; Ivor McFadden
- Cinematography: Paul H. Allen
- Production company: Sierra Pictures
- Distributed by: Chesterfield Pictures
- Release date: December 9, 1925
- Running time: 45 minutes
- Country: United States
- Language: Silent (English intertitles)

Fangs of Fate is a 1925 American silent Western film directed by Horace B. Carpenter and starring Bill Patton, Dorothy Donald, and Ivor McFadden.

== Plot ==
As described in a film magazine review, outlaws terrorize the town of Arcady, Arizona. Bob Haynes, a stranger, is attracted by Azalia Bolton, daughter of a boarding house keeper, and protects her from some drunken rowdies. She inspires him to change his life to the better. Sheriff Dan Dodo Briggs offers to make Bob a deputy, but he declines. Later, following a stage coach holdup, he accepts the offered position and brings in the guilty bandits, but confesses that he used to be their leader. The outlaws are sent to jail, but Judge Harcourt paroles Bob into Azalia's custody.

== Cast ==
- Bill Patton as Bob Haynes
- Dorothy Donald as Azalia Bolton
- Ivor McFadden as Sheriff Dan Dodo Briggs
- Beatrice Allen as Azalia's Mother
- William Bertram as Judge Harcourt
- Merrill McCormick as 'Red Mack' - the Renegade
- Karl Silvera as Lew Sontag
- Tex Starr as Bill (uncredited)
- Ted Wells as Man Who Reports Robbery (uncredited)
