= List of American films of 1924 =

American films released in 1924

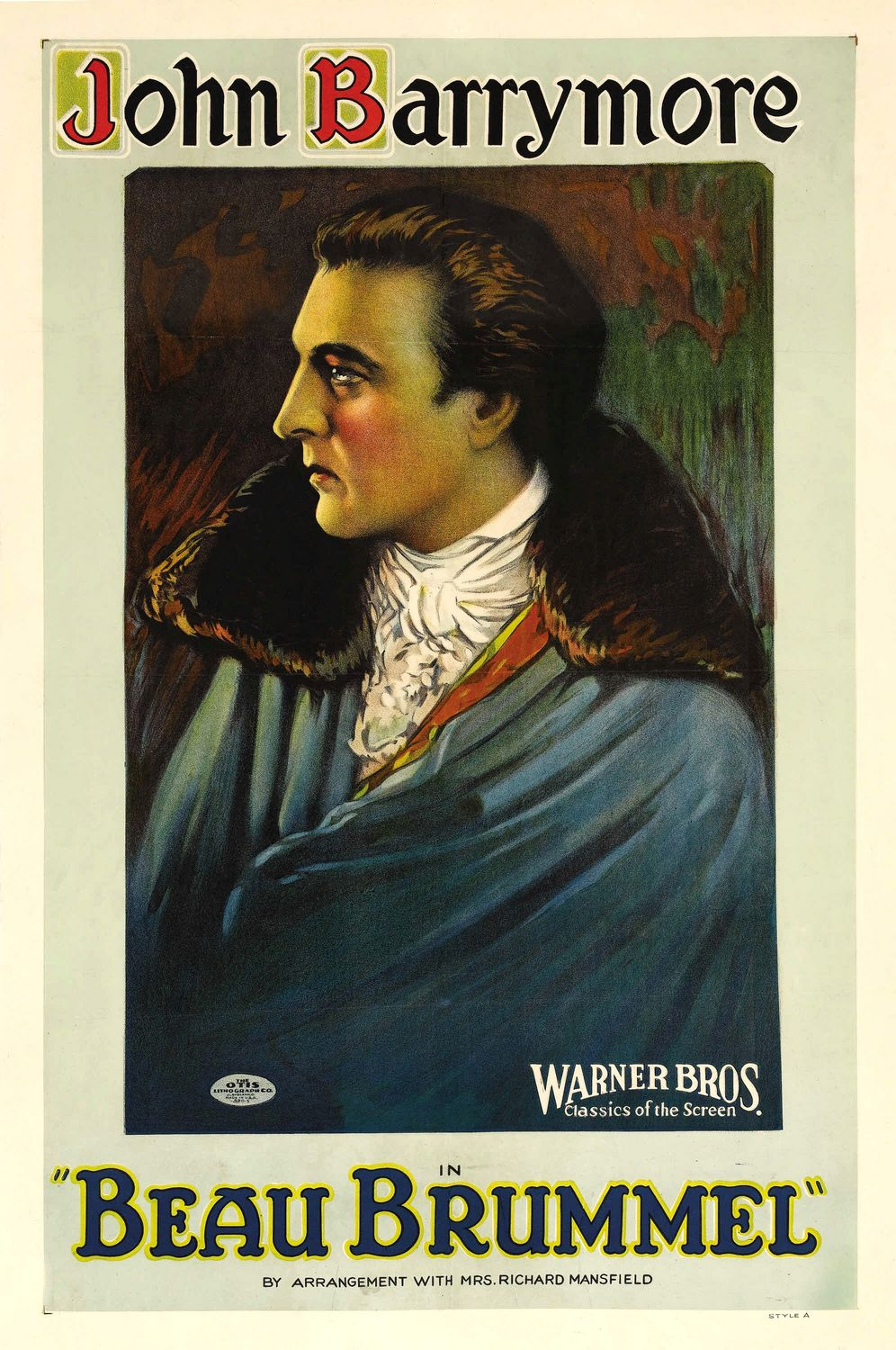
Beau Brummel starring John Barrymore and Mary Astor.

American firms released more than 584 feature films in 1924.

== A ==
Title	Director	Featured Cast	Genre	Note
40-Horse Hawkins	Edward Sedgwick	Hoot Gibson, Anne Cornwall	Comedy	Universal
$50,000 Reward	Clifford S. Elfelt	Ken Maynard, Esther Ralston	Western	Independent
Abraham Lincoln	Phil Rosen	George A. Billings	Biographical	First National Pictures
Ace of Cactus Range	Victor Adamson	Art Mix, Virginia Warwick	Western	Independent
After the Ball	Dallas M. Fitzgerald	Gaston Glass, Miriam Cooper	Drama	FBO
The Age of Innocence	Wesley Ruggles	Beverly Bayne, Edith Roberts	Drama	Warner Bros.
The Air Hawk	Bruce Mitchell	Al Wilson, Virginia Brown Faire	Action	FBO
The Alaskan	Herbert Brenon	Thomas Meighan, Estelle Taylor	Adventure	Paramount
Alimony	James W. Horne	Warner Baxter, Ruby Miller	Drama	FBO
Along Came Ruth	Edward F. Cline	Viola Dana, Walter Hiers	Comedy	MGM
America	D. W. Griffith	Carol Dempster, Neil Hamilton	Historical	United Artists
American Manners	James W. Horne	Richard Talmadge, Mark Fenton	Action	FBO
Another Man's Wife	Bruce Mitchell	James Kirkwood, Lila Lee, Wallace Beery	Drama	PDC
Another Scandal	Edward H. Griffith	Lois Wilson, Holmes Herbert	Drama	PDC
The Arab	Rex Ingram	Ramon Novarro, Alice Terry	Romance	MGM
The Arizona Express	Tom Buckingham	Pauline Starke, Evelyn Brent	Crime	Fox Film
Argentine Love	Allan Dwan	Bebe Daniels, Ricardo Cortez	Romance	Paramount
The Average Woman	Christy Cabanne	Pauline Garon, David Powell	Drama	Independent

== B ==
Title	Director	Cast	Genre	Notes
Babbitt	Harry Beaumont	Willard Louis, Mary Alden	Drama	Warner Bros.
Baffled	J. P. McGowan	Franklyn Farnum, Alyce Mills	Western	Independent
The Bandolero	Tom Terriss	Pedro de Cordoba, Gustav von Seyffertitz	Drama	MGM
Barbara Frietchie	Lambert Hillyer	Florence Vidor, Edmund Lowe	Drama	PDC
Battling Brewster	Dell Henderson	Franklyn Farnum, Helen Holmes	Drama	Rayart
Battling Bunyan	Paul Hurst	Wesley Barry, Frank Campeau	Comedy	Pathé Exchange
The Battling Fool	W.S. Van Dyke	William Fairbanks, Eva Novak	Drama	Columbia
Battling Mason	William James Craft, Jack Nelson	Frank Merrill, Eva Novak, Joseph W. Girard	Comedy	Independent
Battling Orioles	Fred Guiol	Glenn Tryon, Blanche Mehaffey	Comedy	Pathé Exchange
Beau Brummel	Harry Beaumont	John Barrymore, Mary Astor	Historical	Warner Bros.
The Beauty Prize	Lloyd Ingraham	Viola Dana, Pat O'Malley	Comedy	MGM
The Beautiful Sinner	W. S. Van Dyke	William Fairbanks, Eva Novak	Crime	Columbia
The Bedroom Window	William C. deMille	May McAvoy, Ricardo Cortez	Mystery	Paramount
Behind the Curtain	Chester M. Franklin	Lucille Ricksen, John Harron	Mystery	Universal
Behind Two Guns	Robert N. Bradbury	Otto Lederer, Marin Sais	Western	Independent
Behold This Woman	J. Stuart Blackton	Irene Rich, Marguerite De La Motte	Drama	Vitagraph
Being Respectable	Phil Rosen	Marie Prevost, Monte Blue, Louise Fazenda	Drama	Warner Bros.
The Beloved Brute	J. Stuart Blackton	Marguerite De La Motte, Victor McLaglen	Western	Vitagraph
Between Friends	J. Stuart Blackton	Lou Tellegen, Anna Q. Nilsson	Drama	Vitagraph
Biff Bang Buddy	Lloyd Ingraham	Buddy Roosevelt, Jean Arthur	Western	Independent
Big Timber	George Melford	William Desmond, Olive Hasbrouck	Drama	Universal
Black Lightning	James P. Hogan	Clara Bow, Eddie Phillips, Mark Fenton	Drama	Gotham
Black Oxfords	Del Lord	Sidney Smith, Vernon Dent, Marceline Day	Comedy	
Bluff	Sam Wood	Agnes Ayres, Antonio Moreno	Drama	Paramount
The Back Trail	George Marshall	Jack Hoxie, Eugenia Gilbert	Western	Universal
The Border Legion	William K. Howard	Antonio Moreno, Helene Chadwick	Western	Paramount
Born Rich	William Nigh	Claire Windsor, Bert Lytell	Comedy	First National
Borrowed Husbands	David Smith	Florence Vidor, Rockliffe Fellowes	Comedy	Vitagraph
The Bowery Bishop	Colin Campbell	Henry B. Walthall, Leota Lorraine	Drama	Selznick
A Boy of Flanders	Victor Schertzinger	Jackie Coogan, Nigel De Brulier	Drama	MGM
The Brass Bowl	Jerome Storm	Edmund Lowe, Claire Adams	Mystery	Fox Film
Branded a Bandit	Paul Hurst	Yakima Canutt, Wilbur McGaugh	Western	Independent
Bread	Victor Schertzinger	Mae Busch, Pat O'Malley, Robert Frazer	Drama	MGM
The Breaking Point	Herbert Brenon	Nita Naldi, Patsy Ruth Miller	Mystery	Paramount
The Breath of Scandal	Louis J. Gasnier	Betty Blythe, Patsy Ruth Miller, Jack Mulhall	Drama	Independent
The Breathless Moment	Robert F. Hill	William Desmond, Charlotte Merriam	Comedy	Universal
Breed of the Border	Harry Garson	Dorothy Dwan, Louise Carver	Western	FBO
Bringin' Home the Bacon	Richard Thorpe	Jay Wilsey, Jean Arthur	Western	Independent
Broadway After Dark	Monta Bell	Adolphe Menjou, Norma Shearer	Comedy	Warner Bros.
Broadway or Bust	Edward Sedgwick	Hoot Gibson, Gertrude Astor	Western	Universal
Broken Barriers	Reginald Barker	James Kirkwood, Norma Shearer, Adolphe Menjou	Drama	MGM
Broken Laws	Roy William Neill	Dorothy Davenport, Percy Marmont	Drama	FBO
Butterfly	Clarence Brown	Laura La Plante, Kenneth Harlan	Romance	Universal
By Divine Right	Roy William Neill	Mildred Harris, Anders Randolf	Drama	FBO

== C ==
Title	Director	Cast	Genre	Notes
A Cafe in Cairo	Chester Withey	Priscilla Dean, Robert Ellis	Drama	PDC
Calibre 45	J. P. McGowan	Franklyn Farnum, Dorothy Wood	Western	Independent
Captain Blood	David Smith	J. Warren Kerrigan, Jean Paige, Charlotte Merriam	Historical	Vitagraph
Captain January	Edward F. Cline	Baby Peggy, Hobart Bosworth, Irene Rich	Drama	Independent
Chalk Marks	John G. Adolfi	Marguerite Snow, June Elvidge	Action	PDC
Changing Husbands	Paul Iribe	Leatrice Joy, Victor Varconi	Comedy	Paramount
Cheap Kisses	John Ince	Lillian Rich, Cullen Landis	Drama	FBO
Christine of the Hungry Heart	George Archainbaud	Florence Vidor, Clive Brook	Drama	First National
The Chorus Lady	Ralph Ince	Margaret Livingston, Alan Roscoe	Drama	PDC
Circe, the Enchantress	Robert Z. Leonard	Mae Murray, James Kirkwood Sr., Tom Rickets	Drama	MGM
The Circus Cowboy	William A. Wellman	Buck Jones, Marian Nixon	Western	Fox Film
The City That Never Sleeps	James Cruze	Louise Dresser, Ricardo Cortez	Drama	Paramount
Classmates	John S. Robertson	Richard Barthelmess, Madge Evans	Drama	First National
The Clean Heart	J. Stuart Blackton	Percy Marmont, Otis Harlan, Marguerite De La Motte	Drama	Vitagraph
Code of the Sea	Victor Fleming	Rod La Rocque, Jacqueline Logan	Adventure	Paramount
Code of the Wilderness	David Smith	John Bowers, Alice Calhoun	Western	Vitagraph
Conductor 1492	Frank Griffin	Johnny Hines, Doris May	Comedy	Warner Bros.
The Confidence Man	Victor Heerman	Thomas Meighan, Virginia Valli	Crime	Paramount
Cornered	William Beaudine	Marie Prevost, Raymond Hatton	Crime	Warner Bros.
The Cowboy and the Flapper	Alan James	William Fairbanks, Dorothy Revier	Western	Independent
Crossed Trails	J. P. McGowan	Franklyn Farnum, Alyce Mills	Western	Independent
Cupid's Rustler	Francis Ford	Edmund Cobb, Florence Gilbert, Janet Gaynor	Western	Independent
Curlytop	Maurice Elvey	Shirley Mason, Warner Oland	Drama	Fox Film
The Cyclone Rider	Tom Buckingham	Reed Howes, Alma Bennett	Drama	Fox Film
Cytherea	George Fitzmaurice	Irene Rich, Alma Rubens, Constance Bennett	Drama	First National

== D ==
Title	Director	Cast	Genre	Notes
Daddies	William A. Seiter	Mae Marsh, Harry Myers	Comedy	Warner Bros.
Damaged Hearts	T. Hayes Hunter	Mary Carr, Jerry Devine	Drama	FBO
The Dancing Cheat	Irving Cummings	Herbert Rawlinson, Alice Lake	Drama	Universal
The Danger Line	Édouard-Émile Violet	Sessue Hayakawa, Tsuru Aoki, Gina Palerme	Drama	FBO
The Dangerous Blonde	Robert F. Hill	Laura La Plante, Edward Hearn	Comedy	Universal
The Dangerous Coward	Albert S. Rogell	Fred Thomson, Hazel Keener	Western	FBO
The Dangerous Flirt	Tod Browning	Evelyn Brent, Edward Earle	Melodrama	FBO
Dangerous Money	Frank Tuttle	William Powell, Bebe Daniels	Drama	Paramount
Dangerous Pleasure	Harry Revier	Niles Welch, Dorothy Revier, Sheldon Lewis	Drama	Independent
Dante's Inferno	Henry Otto	Ralph Lewis, Winifred Landis	Horror	Fox Film; Remake of 1935 film
Daring Chances	Clifford Smith	Jack Hoxie, Alta Allen	Western	Universal
Daring Love	Rowland G. Edwards	Elaine Hammerstein, Huntley Gordon	Drama	Independent
Daring Youth	William Beaudine	Bebe Daniels, Norman Kerry, Lee Moran	Comedy drama	Independent
Dark Stairways	Robert F. Hill	Herbert Rawlinson, Ruth Dwyer	Mystery	Universal
The Dark Swan	Millard Webb	Marie Prevost, Monte Blue	Drama	Warner Bros.
Darwin Was Right	Lewis Seiler	Nell Brantley, George O'Hara	Comedy	Fox Film
Daughters of Pleasure	William Beaudine	Marie Prevost and Monte Blue	Romantic comedy	Independent
Daughters of the Night	Elmer Clifton	Orville Caldwell, Alyce Mills	Crime	Fox Film
Daughters of Today	Rollin S. Sturgeon	Patsy Ruth Miller, Ralph Graves	Drama	Selznick
The Dawn of a Tomorrow	George Melford	Jacqueline Logan, David Torrence	Drama	Paramount
The Deadwood Coach	Lynn Reynolds	Tom Mix, George Bancroft	Western	Fox Film
Defying the Law	Bertram Bracken	Lew Cody, Renée Adorée, Josef Swickard	Drama	Gotham
The Desert Hawk	Leon De La Mothe	Ben F. Wilson, Mildred Harris, Louise Lester	Western	Arrow
The Desert Outlaw	Edmund Mortimer	Buck Jones, Evelyn Brent	Western	Fox Film
The Desert Sheik	Tom Terriss	Wanda Hawley, Nigel Barrie	Drama	FBO
The Diamond Bandit	Francis Ford	Frank Baker, Florence Gilbert	Western	Independent
Discontented Husbands	Edward LeSaint	James Kirkwood, Cleo Madison	Drama	Columbia
The Dixie Handicap	Reginald Barker	Claire Windsor, Lloyd Hughes	Sports drama	MGM
Don't Doubt Your Husband	Harry Beaumont	Viola Dana, Allan Forrest	Comedy	Metro
Dorothy Vernon of Haddon Hall	Marshall Neilan	Mary Pickford, Anders Randolf	Historical	United Artists
The Dramatic Life of Abraham Lincoln	Phil Rosen	George A. Billings, Ruth Clifford	Biopic	First National
Dynamite Dan	Bruce M. Mitchell	Frank Rice, Boris Karloff	Action	Independent
Dynamite Smith	Ralph Ince	Jacqueline Logan, Bessie Love, Wallace Beery	Drama	Pathé Exchange

== E ==
Title	Director	Cast	Genre	Notes
The Eagle's Claw	Charles R. Seeling	Guinn "Big Boy" Williams, Lew Meehan	Western	Independent
East of Broadway	William K. Howard	Owen Moore, Marguerite De La Motte	Comedy	Independent
Empty Hands	Victor Fleming	Jack Holt, Norma Shearer	Romance	Paramount
Empty Hearts	Alfred Santell	John Bowers, Clara Bow	Drama	Independent
The Enchanted Cottage	John S. Robertson	Richard Barthelmess, May McAvoy	Romance	First National
The Enemy Sex	James Cruze	Betty Compson, Percy Marmont	Drama	Paramount
Excitement	Robert F. Hill	Laura La Plante, Guy Edward Hearn	Comedy	Universal

== F ==
Title	Director	Cast	Genre	Notes
Fair Week	Rob Wagner	Walter Hiers, Carmen Phillips	Comedy	Paramount
The Family Secret	William A. Seiter	Baby Peggy, Gladys Hulette	Drama	Universal
Fast and Fearless	Richard Thorpe	Jay Wilsey, Jean Arthur	Western	Independent
The Fast Set	William C. de Mille	Betty Compson, Adolphe Menjou	Comedy drama	Paramount
The Fast Worker	William A. Seiter	Reginald Denny, Laura La Plante	Comedy	Universal
The Fatal Mistake	Scott R. Dunlap	William Fairbanks, Eva Novak	Crime	Columbia
Feet of Clay	Cecil B. DeMille	Vera Reynolds, Rod La Rocque	Drama	Paramount
The Female	Sam Wood	Betty Compson, Warner Baxter	Drama	Paramount
A Fight for Honor	Henry MacRae	William Fairbanks, Eva Novak	Action	Columbia
The Fighting Coward	James Cruze	Ernest Torrence, Mary Astor	Comedy	Paramount
Fighting Fury	Clifford Smith	Jack Hoxie, Helen Holmes	Western	Universal
The Fighting Adventurer	Tom Forman	Pat O'Malley, Mary Astor	Drama	Universal
A Fighting Heart	Jack Nelson	Frank Merrill, Margaret Landis, Otto Lederer	Action	Independent
Find Your Man	Malcolm St. Clair	June Marlowe, Eric St. Clair	Adventure	Warner Bros.
The Fighting Sap	Albert S. Rogell	Fred Thomson, Hazel Keener	Western	FBO
The Fire Patrol	Hunt Stromberg	Anna Q. Nilsson, Madge Bellamy	Drama	Independent
Flames of Desire	Denison Clift	Wyndham Standing, Diana Miller	Drama	Fox Film
Flaming Barriers	George Melford	Jacqueline Logan, Antonio Moreno	Drama	Paramount
The Flaming Forties	Tom Forman	Harry Carey, Jacqueline Gadsden	Western	PDC
Flapper Wives	Jane Murfin	May Allison, Rockliffe Fellowes	Drama	Selznick
Flashing Spurs	B. Reeves Eason	Bob Custer, Marguerite Clayton	Western	FBO
Flirting with Love	John Francis Dillon	Colleen Moore, Conway Tearle	Drama	First National
Floodgates	George Irving	John Lowell, Evangeline Russell, Jane Thomas	Drama	Independent
Flowing Gold	Joseph De Grasse	Anna Q. Nilsson, Milton Sills	Drama	First National
The Folly of Vanity	Maurice Elvey, Henry Otto	Billie Dove, Jack Mulhall	Drama	Fox Film
A Fool's Awakening	Harold M. Shaw	Mary Alden, Lionel Belmore	Drama	Metro
Fools Highway	Irving Cummings	Mary Philbin, Pat O'Malley	Romance	Universal
Fools in the Dark	Alfred Santell	Patsy Ruth Miller, Matt Moore	Comedy	FBO
The Foolish Virgin	George W. Hill	Elaine Hammerstein, Robert Frazer	Drama	Columbia
For Another Woman	David Kirkland	Kenneth Harlan, Florence Billings	Drama	Rayart
For Sale	George Archainbaud	Claire Windsor, Adolphe Menjou	Drama	First National
Forbidden Paradise	Ernst Lubitsch	Pola Negri, Rod La Rocque, Adolphe Menjou	Adventure	Paramount

== G ==
Title	Director	Cast	Genre	Notes
The Gaiety Girl	King Baggot	Mary Philbin, William Haines	Romance	Universal
The Galloping Ace	Robert N. Bradbury	Jack Hoxie, Margaret Morris	Western	Universal
The Galloping Fish	Del Andrews	Louise Fazenda, Syd Chaplin	Comedy	First National
Galloping Gallagher	Albert S. Rogell	Fred Thomson, Hazel Keener	Western	FBO
Galloping Hoofs	George B. Seitz	Allene Ray, Johnnie Walker	Western	Pathé Exchange
Gambling Wives	Dell Henderson	Marjorie Daw, Edward Earle	Drama	Independent
The Garden of Weeds	James Cruze	Betty Compson, Warner Baxter	Drama	Paramount
Geared to Go	Albert S. Rogell	Reed Howes, Carmelita Geraghty	Drama	Rayart
George Washington Jr.	Malcolm St. Clair	Wesley Barry, Gertrude Olmstead	Comedy	Warner Bros.
Gerald Cranston's Lady	Emmett J. Flynn	James Kirkwood, Alma Rubens	Drama	Fox Film
The Girl in the Limousine	Noel M. Smith	Larry Semon, Claire Adams	Comedy	First National
A Girl of the Limberlost	James Leo Meehan	Gloria Grey, Emily Fitzroy	Drama	FBO
Girl Shy	Fred Newmeyer, Sam Taylor	Harold Lloyd, Jobyna Ralston	Romantic comedy	Pathé Exchange
Girls Men Forget	Maurice Campbell, Wilfred Lucas	Patsy Ruth Miller, Alan Hale	Comedy	Independent
Gold Heels	W. S. Van Dyke	Robert Agnew, Peggy Shaw	Drama	Fox Film
The Goldfish	Jerome Storm	Constance Talmadge, Jack Mulhall	Comedy	First National
Good Bad Boy	Edward F. Cline	Joe Butterworth, Mary Jane Irving	Comedy	Independent
Great Diamond Mystery	Denison Clift	Shirley Mason, Jackie Saunders	Mystery	Fox Film
The Great White Way	E. Mason Hopper	Anita Stewart, Oscar Shaw	Sports comedy	Goldwyn
Greater Than Marriage	Victor Halperin	Marjorie Daw, Lou Tellegen	Drama	Vitagraph
The Greatest Love of All	George Beban	George Beban, Jack W. Johnston	Drama	Associated Exhibitors
Greed	Erich von Stroheim	ZaSu Pitts, Gibson Gowland	Drama	MGM
Grit	Frank Tuttle	Glenn Hunter, Roland Young	Crime	Independent
The Guilty One	Joseph Henabery	Agnes Ayres, Edmund Burns	Mystery	Paramount

== H ==
Title	Director	Cast	Genre	Notes
Half-A-Dollar-Bill	W.S. Van Dyke	Anna Q. Nilsson, William P. Carleton	Drama	Metro
The Hansom Cabman	Harry Edwards	Harry Langdon, Marceline Day, Charlotte Mineau	Comedy	Pathé Exchange
Happiness	King Vidor	Laurette Taylor, Pat O'Malley, Hedda Hopper	Comedy	MGM
Hard-Hittin' Hamilton	Richard Thorpe	Jay Wilsey, Hazel Keener	Action	Independent
He Who Gets Slapped	Victor Sjöström	Lon Chaney, Norma Shearer, John Gilbert	Drama	MGM
The Heart Bandit	Oscar Apfel	Viola Dana, Milton Sills	Drama	Metro
The Heart Buster	Jack Conway	Tom Mix, Esther Ralston	Western	Fox Film
Hearts of Oak	John Ford	Hobart Bosworth, Pauline Starke	Drama	Fox Film
Helen's Babies	William A. Seiter	Baby Peggy, Edward Everett Horton, Clara Bow	Comedy	Independent
Her Love Story	Allan Dwan	Gloria Swanson, Ian Keith	Romance	Paramount
Her Marriage Vow	Millard Webb	Monte Blue, Willard Louis	Drama	Warner Bros.
Her Night of Romance	Sidney Franklin	Constance Talmadge, Ronald Colman, Jean Hersholt	Romance	First National
Her Own Free Will	Paul Scardon	Helene Chadwick, Holmes Herbert	Drama	PDC
The Heritage of the Desert	Irvin Willat	Bebe Daniels, Ernest Torrence, Noah Beery	Western	Paramount
High Speed	Herbert Blaché	Herbert Rawlinson, Carmelita Geraghty	Comedy	Universal
The Hill Billy	George W. Hill	Jack Pickford, Lucille Ricksen	Drama	Independent
His Darker Self	John W. Noble	Lloyd Hamilton, Tom Wilson, Sally Long	Comedy	Hodkinson
His Forgotten Wife	William A. Seiter	Warner Baxter, Madge Bellamy	Drama	FBO
His Hour	King Vidor	Aileen Pringle, John Gilbert	Drama	MGM
Hit and Run	Edward Sedgwick	Hoot Gibson, Cyril Ring	Comedy	Universal
Hold Your Breath	Scott Sidney	Dorothy Devore, Walter Hiers	Comedy	PDC
Honor Among Men	Denison Clift	Edmund Lowe, Claire Adams	Drama	Fox Film
Hook and Ladder	Edward Sedgwick	Hoot Gibson, Frank Beal	Western	Universal
The Hoosier Schoolmaster	Oliver L. Sellers	Henry Hull, Jane Thomas	Drama	PDC
Hot Water	Fred C. Newmeyer	Harold Lloyd, Jobyna Ralston	Comedy	Pathé Exchange
The House of Youth	Ralph Ince	Jacqueline Logan, Malcolm McGregor	Drama	PDC
How to Educate a Wife	Monta Bell	Marie Prevost, Monte Blue	Comedy	Warner Bros.
The Humming Bird	Sidney Olcott	Gloria Swanson, Edmund Burns	Crime drama	Paramount
Husbands and Lovers	John M. Stahl	Lewis Stone, Florence Vidor	Comedy	First National

== I ==
Title	Director	Cast	Genre	Notes
I Am the Man	Ivan Abramson	Lionel Barrymore, Seena Owen	Drama	FBO
Icebound	William C. deMille	Richard Dix, Lois Wilson	Drama	Paramount
Idle Tongues	Lambert Hillyer	Percy Marmont, Doris Kenyon	Drama	First National
In Every Woman's Life	Irving Cummings	Virginia Valli, Lloyd Hughes	Drama	First National
In Fast Company	James W. Horne	Richard Talmadge, Mildred Harris	Action	Independent
In Hollywood with Potash and Perlmutter	Alfred E. Green	Vera Gordon, Betty Blythe	Comedy	First National
In Love with Love	Rowland V. Lee	Marguerite De La Motte, Allan Forrest	Comedy	Fox Film
Inez from Hollywood	Alfred E. Green	Anna Q. Nilsson, Lewis Stone, Mary Astor	Drama	First National
The Iron Horse	John Ford	George O'Brien, Madge Bellamy	Western	Fox Film
Is Love Everything?	Christy Cabanne	Alma Rubens, Frank Mayo	Drama	Independent
Isn't Life Wonderful	D. W. Griffith	Carol Dempster, Neil Hamilton	Drama	United Artists
It Is the Law	J. Gordon Edwards	Arthur Hohl, Herbert Heyes	Mystery	Fox Film

== J ==
Title	Director	Cast	Genre	Notes
Jack O'Clubs	Robert F. Hill	Herbert Rawlinson, Ruth Dwyer	Crime	Universal
Janice Meredith	Walter Futter, E. Mason Hopper	Marion Davies, Holbrook Blinn, Tyrone Power Sr.	Historical	MGM
Judgment of the Storm	Del Andrews	Lloyd Hughes, Lucille Ricksen	Drama	FBO
Just Off Broadway	Edmund Mortimer	John Gilbert, Marian Nixon	Drama	Fox Film

== K ==
Title	Director	Cast	Genre	Notes
K – The Unknown	Harry A. Pollard	Virginia Valli, Percy Marmont	Mystery	Universal
The King of Wild Horses	Fred Jackman	Edna Murphy, Charley Chase	Western	Pathé Exchange

== L ==
Title	Director	Cast	Genre	Notes
Ladies to Board	John G. Blystone	Tom Mix, Gertrude Olmstead	Comedy	Fox Film
A Lady of Quality	Hobart Henley	Virginia Valli, Milton Sills	Historical	Universal
Lash of the Whip	Francis Ford	Ashton Dearholt, Harry Dunkinson, Florence Gilbert	Western	Independent
The Last Man on Earth	John G. Blystone	Earle Foxe, Grace Cunard	Comedy	Fox Film
The Last of the Duanes	Lynn Reynolds	Tom Mix, Marian Nixon	Western	Fox Film
Laughing at Danger	James W. Horne	Richard Talmadge, Eva Novak	Action	FBO
The Law and the Lady	John L. McCutcheon	Alice Lake, Tyrone Power Sr., Maurice Costello	Drama	Independent
The Law Forbids	Jess Robbins	Robert Ellis, Elinor Fair	Drama	Universal
Leap Year	James Cruze	Roscoe Arbuckle, Mary Thurman	Comedy	Paramount
Leave It to Gerry	Arvid E. Gillstrom	Billie Rhodes, William Collier Jr., Claire McDowell	Comedy	Independent
Legend of Hollywood	Renaud Hoffman	Percy Marmont, Zasu Pitts	Drama	PDC
Lend Me Your Husband	Christy Cabanne	Doris Kenyon, David Powell	Drama	Associated Exhibitors
Let Not Man Put Asunder	J. Stuart Blackton	Pauline Frederick, Lou Tellegen	Drama	Vitagraph
Life's Greatest Game	Emory Johnson	Tom Santschi, Jane Thomas	Sports	FBO
The Lighthouse by the Sea	Malcolm St. Clair	William Collier Jr., Louise Fazenda	Adventure	Warner Bros.
The Lightning Rider	Lloyd Ingraham	Harry Carey, Virginia Brown Faire	Western	Independent
Lightning Romance	Albert S. Rogell	Reed Howes, Ethel Shannon	Drama	Rayart
Lilies of the Field	John Francis Dillon	Corinne Griffith, Conway Tearle	Drama	First National
Lily of the Dust	Dimitri Buchowetzki	Pola Negri, Ben Lyon	Drama	Paramount
Listen Lester	William A. Seiter	Louise Fazenda, Harry Myers	Comedy drama	Independent
Little Robinson Crusoe	Edward F. Cline	Jackie Coogan, Will Walling	Adventure	MGM
The Lone Chance	Howard M. Mitchell	John Gilbert, Evelyn Brent	Drama	Fox Film
The Lone Wolf	Stanner E. V. Taylor	Dorothy Dalton, Jack Holt	Mystery	Independent
A Lost Lady	Harry Beaumont	Irene Rich, June Marlowe	Drama	Warner Bros.
Love and Glory	Rupert Julian	Charles de Rochefort, Wallace MacDonald	Drama	Universal
The Love Bandit	Dell Henderson	Doris Kenyon, Victor Sutherland	Western	Vitagraph
Love Letters	David Selman	Shirley Mason, John Miljan	Drama	Fox Film
The Love Master	Laurence Trimble	Lillian Rich, Strongheart	Drama	First National
Love of Women	Whitman Bennett	Helene Chadwick, Montagu Love	Drama	Selznick
Love's Whirlpool	Bruce M. Mitchell	James Kirkwood, Lila Lee	Crime	Independent
Love's Wilderness	Robert Z. Leonard	Corinne Griffith, Holmes Herbert	Drama	First National
The Lover of Camille	Harry Beaumont	Monte Blue, Willard Louis, Marie Prevost	Romance	Warner Bros.
Lovers' Lane	Phil Rosen, William Beaudine	Robert Ellis, Gertrude Olmstead	Romantic comedy	Warner Bros.
Loving Lies	W. S. Van Dyke	Evelyn Brent, Monte Blue	Drama	Independent
The Luck o' the Foolish	Harry Edwards	Harry Langdon, Marceline Day, Frank J. Coleman	Comedy	Pathé Exchange
The Lullaby	Chester Bennett	Jane Novak, Robert Anderson	Drama	FBO
Lure of the Yukon	Norman Dawn	Eva Novak, Buddy Roosevelt	Western	Independent

== M ==
Title	Director	Cast	Genre	Notes
Mademoiselle Midnight	Robert Z. Leonard	Mae Murray, Monte Blue	Drama	Tiffany
Madonna of the Streets	Edwin Carewe	Alla Nazimova, Milton Sills	Drama	First National
A Man's Mate	Edmund Mortimer	John Gilbert, Renée Adorée	Drama	Fox Film
The Man from Wyoming	Robert N. Bradbury	Jack Hoxie, Lillian Rich	Western	Universal
The Man Who Came Back	Emmett J. Flynn	George O'Brien, Dorothy Mackaill	Drama	Fox Film
The Man Who Fights Alone	Wallace Worsley	William Farnum, Lois Wilson, Edward Everett Horton	Drama	Paramount
The Man Who Played Square	Alfred Santell	Buck Jones, Wanda Hawley	Action	Fox Film
The Man Without a Heart	Burton L. King	Kenneth Harlan, Jane Novak	Drama	Independent
Manhandled	Allan Dwan	Gloria Swanson, Tom Moore	Comedy	Paramount
Manhattan	R. H. Burnside	Richard Dix, Jacqueline Logan	Comedy	Paramount
The Marriage Cheat	John Griffith Wray	Leatrice Joy, Adolphe Menjou	Drama	First National
The Marriage Circle	Ernst Lubitsch	Florence Vidor, Adolphe Menjou, Monte Blue, Marie Prevost	Comedy	Warner Bros.
Married Flirts	Robert G. Vignola	Pauline Frederick, Mae Busch	Drama	MGM
Marry in Haste	Duke Worne	William Fairbanks, Dorothy Revier	Comedy	Independent
The Martyr Sex	Duke Worne	William Fairbanks, Dorothy Revier	Drama	Independent
The Mask of Lopez	Albert S. Rogell	Fred Thomson, Wilfred Lucas	Western	FBO
The Masked Dancer	Burton L. King	Lowell Sherman, Helene Chadwick	Romance	Independent
The Measure of a Man	Arthur Rosson	Francis Ford, Marin Sais	Drama	Universal
Meddling Women	Ivan Abramson	Lionel Barrymore, Sigrid Holmquist	Drama	Independent
Men	Dimitri Buchowetzki	Pola Negri, Robert Frazer	Drama	Paramount
Merton of the Movies	James Cruze	Glenn Hunter, Viola Dana	Comedy	Paramount
Miami	Alan Crosland	Betty Compson, Lawford Davidson	Drama	Independent
The Midnight Express	George W. Hill	Elaine Hammerstein, William Haines	Romance	Columbia
Midnight Secrets	Jack Nelson	George Larkin, Kathleen Myers	Action	Rayart
The Millionaire Cowboy	Harry Garson	Maurice "Lefty" Flynn, Gloria Grey	Western	FBO
The Mine with the Iron Door	Sam Wood	Dorothy Mackaill, Raymond Hatton	Western	Independent
The Mirage	George Archainbaud	Florence Vidor, Clive Brook	Comedy	PDC
Missing Daughters	William Clifford	Eileen Percy, Pauline Starke	Drama	Selznick
Monsieur Beaucaire	Sidney Olcott	Rudolph Valentino, Bebe Daniels, Lois Wilson, Doris Kenyon	Drama	Paramount
The Moral Sinner	Ralph Ince	Dorothy Dalton, James Rennie	Crime	Paramount
My Husband's Wives	Maurice Elvey	Shirley Mason, Bryant Washburn	Drama	Fox Film
My Man	David Smith	Patsy Ruth Miller, Dustin Farnum	Drama	Vitagraph

== N ==
Title	Director	Cast	Genre	Notes
Name the Man	Victor Seastrom	Mae Busch, Conrad Nagel	Drama	Goldwyn
The Navigator	Donald Crisp, Buster Keaton,	Buster Keaton, Kathryn McGuire	Comedy	MGM
Nellie, the Beautiful Cloak Model	Emmett J. Flynn	Claire Windsor, Edmund Lowe	Drama	Goldwyn
Never Say Die	George Crone	Douglas MacLean, Lillian Rich	Comedy	Independent
The New School Teacher	Gregory La Cava	Doris Kenyon, Mickey Bennett	Comedy	Independent
The Next Corner	Sam Wood	Dorothy Mackaill, Lon Chaney, Conway Tearle	Drama	Paramount
The Night Hawk	Stuart Paton	Harry Carey, Claire Adams	Western	Independent
The Night Message	Perley Poore Sheehan	Howard Truesdale, Gladys Hulette	Drama	Universal
The No-Gun Man	Harry Garson	Maurice Bennett Flynn, Gloria Grey	Western	FBO
No More Women	Lloyd Ingraham	Matt Moore, Madge Bellamy	Comedy	Independent
North of 36	Irvin Willat	Jack Holt, Ernest Torrence, Lois Wilson	Western	Paramount
North of Nevada	Albert S. Rogell	Fred Thomson, Hazel Keener	Western	FBO
Not a Drum Was Heard	William A. Wellman	Buck Jones, Betty Bouton	Western	Fox Film

== O ==
Title	Director	Cast	Genre	Notes
Oh, You Tony!	John G. Blystone	Tom Mix, Claire Adams	Western	Fox Film
On Probation	Charles Hutchison	Edith Thornton, Robert Ellis, Joseph Kilgour	Drama	Independent
On the Stroke of Three	F. Harmon Weight	Kenneth Harlan, Madge Bellamy	Drama	FBO
On Time	Henry Lehrman	Richard Talmadge, Billie Dove	Comedy	Independent
One Glorious Night	Scott R. Dunlap	Elaine Hammerstein, Alan Roscoe	Drama	Columbia
One Law for the Woman	Dell Henderson	Cullen Landis, Mildred Harris	Western	Vitagraph
One Night in Rome	Clarence G. Badger	Laurette Taylor, Tom Moore	Romance	MGM
The Only Woman	Sidney Olcott	Norma Talmadge, Eugene O'Brien	Drama	First National
Open All Night	Paul Bern	Viola Dana, Jetta Goudal, Raymond Griffith	Comedy	Paramount
The Other Kind of Love	Duke Worne	William Fairbanks, Dorothy Revier	Drama	Independent

== P ==
Title	Director	Cast	Genre	Notes
Pagan Passions	Colin Campbell	Wyndham Standing, June Elvidge	Drama	Selznick
The Painted Flapper	John Gorman	James Kirkwood, Pauline Garon	Romance	Independent
The Painted Lady	Chester Bennett	George O'Brien, Dorothy Mackaill	Drama	Fox Film
Painted People	Clarence G. Badger	Colleen Moore, Ben Lyon	Comedy	First National
Pal o' Mine	Edward LeSaint	Irene Rich, Josef Swickard	Drama	Columbia
The Passing of Wolf MacLean	Paul Hurst	Jack Mower, Alma Rayford	Western	Independent
Passion's Pathway	Bertram Bracken	Estelle Taylor, Wilfred Lucas	Drama	Independent
The Pell Street Mystery	Joseph Franz	George Larkin, Frank Whitson	Mystery	Rayart
The Perfect Flapper	John Francis Dillon	Colleen Moore, Syd Chaplin, Phyllis Haver	Comedy	First National
Peter Pan	Herbert Brenon, Glen Castle	Betty Bronson, Ernest Torrence, Virginia Browne Faire	Fantasy, Family	Paramount
The Phantom Horseman	Robert N. Bradbury	Jack Hoxie, Lillian Rich	Western	Universal
Phantom Justice	Richard Thomas	Rod La Rocque, Kathryn McGuire	Crime	FBO
Pied Piper Malone	Alfred E. Green	Thomas Meighan, Lois Wilson	Comedy drama	Paramount
Pioneer's Gold	Victor Adamson	Kathryn McGuire, Pete Morrison, Virginia Warwick	Western	Independent
Playthings of Desire	Burton L. King	Estelle Taylor, Mahlon Hamilton	Drama	Independent
The Plunderer	George Archainbaud	Frank Mayo, Evelyn Brent	Western	Fox Film
Poisoned Paradise	Louis J. Gasnier	Kenneth Harlan, Clara Bow	Drama	Independent
The Price of a Party	Charles Giblyn	Hope Hampton, Mary Astor	Drama	Independent
The Price She Paid	Henry MacRae	Alma Rubens, Frank Mayo	Drama	Columbia

== R ==
Title	Director	Cast	Genre	Notes
Racing for Life	Henry MacRae	Eva Novak, William Fairbanks	Action	Columbia
Racing Luck	Herman C. Raymaker	Monty Banks, Helen Ferguson	Comedy	Independent
Ramshackle House	F. Harmon Weight	Betty Compson, John Davidson	Drama	PDC
Range Blood	Francis Ford	Edmund Cobb, Florence Gilbert	Western	Independent
Rarin' to Go	Richard Thorpe	Jay Wilsey, Olin Francis	Western	Independent
The Reckless Age	Harry A. Pollard	Reginald Denny, Ruth Dwyer	Comedy	Universal
Reckless Romance	Scott Sidney	Harry Myers, Wanda Hawley	Comedy	PDC
Reckless Speed	William James Craft	Frank Merrill, Virginia Warwick, Joseph W. Girard	Action	Independent
The Recoil	T. Hayes Hunter	Mahlon Hamilton, Betty Blythe	Drama	Goldwyn
The Red Lily	Fred Niblo	Ramon Novarro, Enid Bennett	Drama	MGM
The Rejected Woman	Albert Parker	Alma Rubens, Conrad Nagel	Drama	Goldwyn
Restless Wives	Gregory La Cava	Doris Kenyon, James Rennie	Drama	Independent
Revelation	George D. Baker	Viola Dana, Monte Blue	Romance	MGM
The Riddle Rider	William James Craft	William Desmond, Eileen Sedgwick	Western	Universal
Ride for Your Life	Edward Sedgwick	Hoot Gibson, Laura La Plante	Western	Universal
Riders Up	Irving Cummings	Creighton Hale, George Cooper	Sports	Universal
Ridgeway of Montana	Clifford Smith	Jack Hoxie, Olive Hasbrouck	Western	Universal
The Ridin' Kid from Powder River	Edward Sedgwick	Hoot Gibson, Gladys Hulette	Western	Universal
The Right of the Strongest	Edgar Lewis	E.K. Lincoln, Helen Ferguson	Drama	Selznick
Rip Roarin' Roberts	Richard Thorpe	Buddy Roosevelt, Joe Rickson	Western	Independent
Roaring Rails	Tom Forman	Harry Carey, Edith Roberts	Action	PDC
A Rodeo Mixup	Francis Ford	Edmund Cobb, Florence Gilbert	Western	Independent
Roaring Lions at Home	Benjamin Stoloff	Oliver Hardy	Comedy	Fox Film
Romance Ranch	Howard M. Mitchell	John Gilbert, Virginia Brown Faire, John Miljan	Drama	Fox Film
Romola	Henry King	Lillian Gish, Dorothy Gish, William Powell	Drama	MGM
The Rose of Paris	Irving Cummings	Mary Philbin, Robert Cain	Romance	Universal
Rough Ridin'	Richard Thorpe	Buddy Roosevelt, Elsa Benham	Western	Independent
The Roughneck	Jack Conway	George O'Brien, Billie Dove	Adventure	Fox Film
Roulette	Stanner E. V. Taylor	Edith Roberts, Norman Trevor	Drama	Selznick

== S ==
Title	Director	Cast	Genre	Notes
A Sainted Devil	Joseph Henabery	Rudolph Valentino, Nita Naldi	Drama	Paramount
Sandra	Arthur H. Sawyer	Barbara La Marr, Bert Lytell	Drama	First National
The Sawdust Trail	Edward Sedgwick	Hoot Gibson, Josie Sedgwick	Western	Universal
The Sea Hawk	Frank Lloyd	Milton Sills	Swashbuckler	First National
Second Youth	Albert Parker	Alfred Lunt, Lynn Fontanne	Comedy	Goldwyn
Secrets	Frank Borzage	Norma Talmadge, Eugene O'Brien	Drama	First National
Secrets of the Night	Herbert Blaché	James Kirkwood, Madge Bellamy, Zasu Pitts	Mystery	Universal
A Self-Made Failure	William Beaudine	Lloyd Hamilton, Ben Alexander, Matt Moore	Comedy	First National
The Shadow of the Desert	George Archainbaud	Frank Mayo, Mildred Harris	Horror	Fox Film
Shadows of Paris	Herbert Brenon	Pola Negri, Adolphe Menjou	Drama	Paramount
Sherlock Jr.	Buster Keaton	Buster Keaton, Kathryn McGuire	Comedy	MGM
The Shooting of Dan McGrew	Clarence G. Badger	Barbara La Marr, Lew Cody, Mae Busch	Drama	Metro
The Side Show of Life	Herbert Brenon	Ernest Torrence, Anna Q. Nilsson	Drama	Paramount
The Signal Tower	Clarence Brown	Virginia Valli, Rockliffe Fellowes	Drama	Universal
The Silent Accuser	Chester M. Franklin	Eleanor Boardman, Raymond McKee	Crime	MGM
The Silent Stranger	Albert S. Rogell	Fred Thomson, Hazel Keener	Western	FBO
The Silent Watcher	Frank Lloyd	Glenn Hunter, Bessie Love	Drama	First National
Silk Stocking Sal	Tod Browning	Evelyn Brent, Robert Ellis	Drama	FBO
Singer Jim McKee	Clifford Smith	William S. Hart, Phyllis Haver	Western	Paramount
Single Wives	George Archainbaud	Corinne Griffith, Milton Sills	Drama	First National
Sinners in Heaven	Alan Crosland	Bebe Daniels, Richard Dix	Drama	Paramount
Sinners in Silk	Hobart Henley	Eleanor Boardman, Adolphe Menjou	Drama	Paramount
The Siren of Seville	Jerome Storm	Priscilla Dean, Allan Forrest	Adventure	PDC
The Sixth Commandment	Christy Cabanne	William Faversham, Charlotte Walker, John Boles	Drama	Independent
The Slanderers	Nat Ross	Johnnie Walker, Gladys Hulette	Drama	Universal
The Snob	Monta Bell	John Gilbert, Norma Shearer, Conrad Nagel	Drama	MGM
A Society Scandal	Allan Dwan	Gloria Swanson, Rod La Rocque	Drama	Paramount
So Big	Charles Brabin	Colleen Moore, Joseph De Grasse	Drama	First National
So This Is Marriage	Hobart Henley	Conrad Nagel, Eleanor Boardman	Drama	MGM
A Son of the Sahara	Edwin Carewe	Bert Lytell, Claire Windsor	Adventure	First National
South of the Equator	William James Craft	Kenneth MacDonald, Virginia Warwick, Gino Corrado	Adventure	Independent
The Speed Spook	Charles Hines	Johnny Hines, Faire Binney	Comedy	Independent
The Spirit of the USA	Emory Johnson	Johnnie Walker, Mary Carr	Drama	FBO
The Spitfire	Christy Cabanne	Betty Blythe, Lowell Sherman	Drama	Independent
Sporting Youth	Harry A. Pollard	Reginald Denny, Laura La Plante	Comedy	Universal
Star Dust Trail	Edmund Mortimer	Shirley Mason, Bryant Washburn	Drama	Fox Film
Stepping Lively	James W. Horne	Richard Talmadge, Mildred Harris	Action	FBO
Stolen Secrets	Irving Cummings	Herbert Rawlinson, Kathleen Myers	Mystery	Universal
The Storm Daughter	George Archainbaud	Priscilla Dean, Tom Santschi	Drama	Universal
The Story Without a Name	Irvin Willat	Agnes Ayres, Antonio Moreno	Action	Paramount
The Stranger	Joseph Henabery	Betty Compson, Richard Dix	Drama	Paramount
The Street of Tears	Travers Vale	Tom Santschi, Marguerite Clayton	Drama	Rayart
Stupid, But Brave	Fatty Arbuckle	Al St. John, Eugene Pallette	Comedy	Independent
Sundown	Laurence Trimble	Bessie Love, Hobart Bosworth	Western	First National
The Sunset Trail	Ernst Laemmle	William Desmond, Gareth Hughes	Western	Universal
Surging Seas	James Chapin	Edith Thornton, George Hackathorne, David Torrence	Drama	Independent
The Sword of Valor	Duke Worne	Dorothy Revier, Otto Lederer, Snowy Baker	Drama	Independent

== T ==
Title	Director	Cast	Genre	Notes
Tainted Money	Henry MacRae	William Fairbanks, Eva Novak	Drama	Columbia
Tarnish	George Fitzmaurice	May McAvoy, Ronald Colman, Marie Prevost	Drama	First National
Teeth	John G. Blystone	Tom Mix, Lucien Littlefield	Action	Fox Film
The Tenth Woman	James Flood	Beverly Bayne, John Roche	Drama	Warner Bros.
Tess of the d'Urbervilles	Marshall Neilan	Blanche Sweet, Conrad Nagel	Drama	MGM
That French Lady	Edmund Mortimer	Shirley Mason, Theodore von Eltz	Drama	Fox Film
The Thief of Bagdad	Raoul Walsh	Douglas Fairbanks, Snitz Edwards, Charles Belcher, Julanne Johnston, Anna May Wong	Swashbuckler	United Artists
This Woman	Phil Rosen	Irene Rich, Ricardo Cortez	Drama	Warner Bros.
Those Who Dance	Lambert Hillyer	Blanche Sweet, Bessie Love, Warner Baxter	Drama	First National
Those Who Dare	John B. O'Brien	John Bowers, Marguerite De La Motte	Drama	
Those Who Judge	Burton L. King	Patsy Ruth Miller, Flora le Breton	Drama	Independent
Three Miles Out	Irvin Willat	Madge Kennedy, Harrison Ford	Drama	Independent
Three Weeks	Alan Crosland	Conrad Nagel, Aileen Pringle	Romance Drama	Goldwyn
Three Women	Ernst Lubitsch	May McAvoy, Pauline Frederick, Marie Prevost	Drama	Warner Bros.
Through the Dark	George W. Hill	Colleen Moore, Forrest Stanley	Crime	Goldwyn
Thundering Hoofs	Albert S. Rogell	Fred Thomson, William Lowery	Western	FBO
Thundering Romance	Richard Thorpe	Jay Wilsey, Jean Arthur	Western	Independent
Thy Name Is Woman	Fred Niblo	Ramon Novarro, Barbara La Marr	Drama	Metro
Tiger Love	George Melford	Antonio Moreno, Estelle Taylor	Drama	Paramount
Tiger Thompson	B. Reeves Eason	Harry Carey, Marguerite Clayton	Western	Independent
The Tomboy	David Kirkland	Herbert Rawlinson, Dorothy Devore	Comedy	Independent
Tongues of Flame	Joseph Henabery	Thomas Meighan, Bessie Love	Drama	Paramount
Torment	Maurice Tourneur	Bessie Love, Owen Moore	Crime drama	First National
The Tornado	King Baggot	House Peters, Ruth Clifford	Drama	Universal
The Torrent	A.P. Younger	William Fairbanks, Ora Carew, Gertrude Astor	Drama	Independent
Traffic in Hearts	Scott R. Dunlap	Robert Frazer, Mildred Harris	Drama	Columbia
Trail Dust	Gordon Hines	David Dunbar, Alfred Hewston	Western	Rayart
The Trail of the Law	Oscar Apfel	Wilfred Lytell, Norma Shearer	Drama	Independent
The Triflers	Louis Gasnier	Mae Busch, Elliott Dexter	Drama	Independent
Trigger Fingers	B. Reeves Eason	Bob Custer, George Field, Margaret Landis	Western	FBO
Triumph	Cecil B. DeMille	Leatrice Joy, Rod La Rocque	Drama	Paramount
The Trouble Shooter	Jack Conway	Tom Mix, Kathleen Key	Western	Fox Film
Troubles of a Bride	Tom Buckingham	Robert Agnew, Mildred June	Comedy	Fox Film
Trouping with Ellen	T. Hayes Hunter	Helene Chadwick, Mary Thurman	Comedy	PDC
True as Steel	Rupert Hughes	Aileen Pringle, Huntley Gordon	Drama	Goldwyn
The Truth About Women	Burton L. King	Hope Hampton, Lowell Sherman	Drama	Independent
Try and Get It	Cullen Tate	Billie Dove, Edward Everett Horton	Comedy	PDC
The Turmoil	Hobart Henley	George Hackathorne, Theodore von Eltz	Drama	Universal
Turned Up	James Chapin	Charles Hutchison, Crauford Kent, Otto Lederer	Drama	Independent
Twenty Dollars a Week	F. Harmon Weight	George Arliss, Ronald Colman, Edith Roberts	Comedy	Selznick
Two Fisted Justice	Dick Hatton	Dick Hatton, Marilyn Mills, J. Morris Foster	Western	Arrow
Two Shall Be Born	Whitman Bennett	Jane Novak, Kenneth Harlan, Sigrid Holmquist	Drama	Vitagraph

== U ==
Title	Director	Cast	Genre	Notes
Unguarded Women	Alan Crosland	Bebe Daniels, Richard Dix, Mary Astor	Drama	Paramount
The Uninvited Guest	Ralph Ince	Maurice "Lefty" Flynn, Mary MacLaren	Drama	Metro
Unmarried Wives	James P. Hogan	Mildred Harris, Gladys Brockwell	Drama	Gotham
Unseen Hands	Jacques Jaccard	Wallace Beery, Fontaine La Rue	Horror	Independent
Untamed Youth	Emile Chautard	Derelys Perdue, Lloyd Hughes	Drama	FBO

== V ==
Title	Director	Cast	Genre	Notes
The Vagabond Trail	William A. Wellman	Buck Jones, Marian Nixon	Western	Fox Film
The Valley of Hate	Russell Allen	Raymond McKee, Helen Ferguson, Earl Metcalfe	Action	Independent
Vanity's Price	Roy William Neill	Anna Q. Nilsson, Wyndham Standing	Drama	FBO
Venus of the South Seas	James R. Sullivan	Annette Kellerman, Roland Purdie	Romance	Independent
The Virgin	Alan James	Kenneth Harlan, Dorothy Revier	Drama	Independent
Virginian Outcast	Robert J. Horner	Jack Perrin, Marjorie Daw, Otto Lederer	Drama	Independent
Virtue's Revolt	James Chapin	Edith Thornton, Crauford Kent, Betty Morrissey	Drama	Independent
Virtuous Liars	Whitman Bennett	David Powell, Edith Allen	Drama	Vitagraph

== W ==
Title	Director	Cast	Genre	Notes
Wages of Virtue	Allan Dwan	Gloria Swanson, Ben Lyon	Drama	Paramount
Wanderer of the Wasteland	Irvin Willat	Jack Holt, Noah Beery	Western	Paramount
Wandering Husbands	William Beaudine	James Kirkwood, Lila Lee, Margaret Livingston	Drama	Independent
Wanted by the Law	Robert N. Bradbury	Jay Morley, William McCall, Frank Rice	Western	Independent
The Warrens of Virginia	Elmer Clifton	George Backus, Robert Andrews, Rosemary Hill	Historical	Fox Film
Week End Husbands	Edward H. Griffith	Holmes Herbert, Alma Rubens, Montagu Love	Drama	Independent
Welcome Stranger	James Young	Florence Vidor, Virginia Brown Faire	Comedy	PDC
Western Feuds	Francis Ford	Edmund Cobb, Florence Gilbert	Western	Independent
Western Luck	George Beranger	Buck Jones, Beatrice Burnham	Western	Fox Film
Western Vengeance	J. P. McGowan	Franklyn Farnum, Marie Walcamp	Western	Independent
The Western Wallop	Clifford Smith	Jack Hoxie, Margaret Landis	Western	Universal
Western Yesterdays	Francis Ford	Edmund Cobb, Florence Gilbert	Western	Independent
What Shall I Do?	John G. Adolfi	Dorothy Mackaill, John Harron, Louise Dresser	Drama	Independent
When a Girl Loves	Victor Halperin	Agnes Ayres, Percy Marmont	Drama	Associated Exhibitors
When a Man's a Man	Edward F. Cline	John Bowers, Marguerite De La Motte	Drama	First National
Which Shall It Be?	Renaud Hoffman	Willis Marks, Ethel Wales, David Torrence	Drama	Hodkinson
The Whispered Name	King Baggot	Ruth Clifford, Charles Clary	Comedy	Universal
White Man	Louis J. Gasnier	Kenneth Harlan, Alice Joyce	Drama	Independent
The White Moth	Maurice Tourneur	Barbara La Marr, Conway Tearle	Drama	First National
The White Sin	William A. Seiter	Madge Bellamy, John Bowers	Romance	FBO
The White Sheep	Hal Roach	Glenn Tryon, Blanche Mehaffey	Comedy	Pathé Exchange
Who's Cheating?	Joseph Levering	Ralph Kellard, Zena Keefe, Montagu Love	Drama	Independent
Why Get Married?	Paul Cazeneuve	Andrée Lafayette, Jack Perrin, Helen Ferguson	Drama	Associated Exhibitors
Why Men Leave Home	John M. Stahl	Lewis Stone, Helene Chadwick	Comedy	First National
The Wife of the Centaur	King Vidor	Eleanor Boardman, John Gilbert	Drama	MGM
Wild Oranges	King Vidor	Virginia Valli, Frank Mayo	Drama	Goldwyn
Wine	Louis J. Gasnier	Clara Bow, Forrest Stanley	Comedy drama	Universal
Wine of Youth	King Vidor	Eleanor Boardman, William Haines	Comedy drama	MGM
Winner Take All	W. S. Van Dyke	Buck Jones, Peggy Shaw	Western	Fox Film
The Wise Virgin	Lloyd Ingraham	Patsy Ruth Miller, Edythe Chapman	Drama	PDC
The Wolf Man	Edmund Mortimer	John Gilbert, Norma Shearer	Drama	Fox Film
The Woman on the Jury	Harry O. Hoyt	Sylvia Breamer, Frank Mayo	Drama	First National
A Woman Who Sinned	Finis Fox	Morgan Wallace, Irene Rich	Drama	FBO
Women First	B. Reeves Eason	William Fairbanks, Eva Novak	Drama	Columbia
Women Who Give	Reginald Barker	Barbara Bedford, Frank Keenan, Renée Adorée	Drama	MGM
Worldly Goods	Paul Bern	Agnes Ayres, Pat O'Malley, Victor Varconi	Comedy	Paramount

== Y–Z ==
Title	Director	Cast	Genre	Notes
The Yankee Consul	James W. Horne	Douglas MacLean, Patsy Ruth Miller	Comedy	Independent
Yankee Madness	Charles R. Seeling	George Larkin, Billie Dove	Adventure	FBO
Yolanda	Robert G. Vignola	Marion Davies, Lyn Harding	Historical	MGM
Young Ideas	Robert F. Hill	Laura La Plante, Lucille Ricksen	Comedy	Universal
Youth for Sale	Christy Cabanne	May Allison, Sigrid Holmquist	Drama	Independent

== See also ==
- 1924 in the United States
