= The Danger Rider =

The Danger Rider may refer to:

- The Danger Rider (1924 film), silent film directed by Denver Dixon
- The Danger Rider (1928 film), silent film western directed by Henry Macrae
