= Secrets of the Night =

1924 film directed by Herbert Blaché

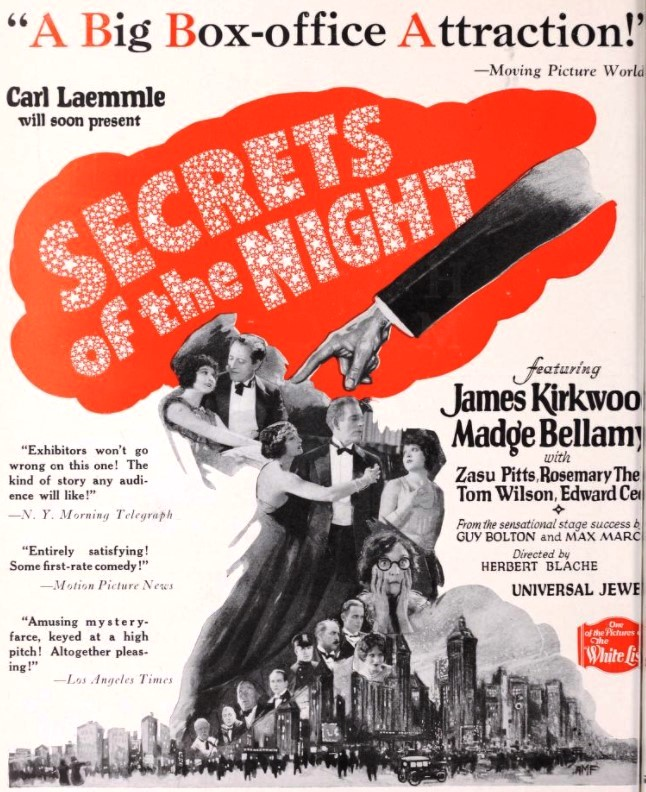
- Film advertisement
- Directed by: Herbert Blaché
- Screenplay by: Edward J. Montagne
- Based on: The Nightcap by Guy Bolton and Max Marcin
- Starring: James Kirkwood
- Cinematography: Gilbert Warrenton
- Production company: Universal Pictures
- Distributed by: Universal Pictures
- Release date: December 11, 1924
- Running time: 64 minutes, 7 reels (6700 ft)
- Country: United States
- Language: Silent (English intertitles)

Secrets of the Night is a 1924 American silent film directed by Herbert Blaché and made at Universal Pictures. The black-and-white "murder mystery-melodrama comedy" stars James Kirkwood Sr., Madge Bellamy, and ZaSu Pitts. It was adapted from the play The Nightcap written by Guy Bolton and Max Marcin. The film was thought lost until a print of the film was rediscovered in a basement in Mississauga, Ontario, in 2017.

== Plot ==
Robert Andrews, president of a bank, invites the bank examiner and several directors to his home for a house party in order to keep him from examining the books and discovering a big shortage. Andrews quarrels with young Hammond, who is in love with his ward, Anne Maynard, and also with Lester Knowles, who is jealous of the friendship between Andrews and his wife Margaret. Andrews courts death as his insurance money will cover the shortage. A little later he is "killed” in Mrs. Knowles’ room following a series of mysterious happenings. The coroner and police find that practically every one has a motive for wanting to get rid of him and suspicion points with about equal force in several directions. This causes the coroner to ask, "Is there anyone in this crowd that did not have a reason for killing Andrews?" Everything is in a turmoil until it is discovered that Andrews is still alive. Cornered, he explains it was all a frame-up to distract the bank examiner's attention from the shortage, which has been repaid, and it develops that the bank examiner has given up his job and is now trying to sell real estate.

== Cast ==
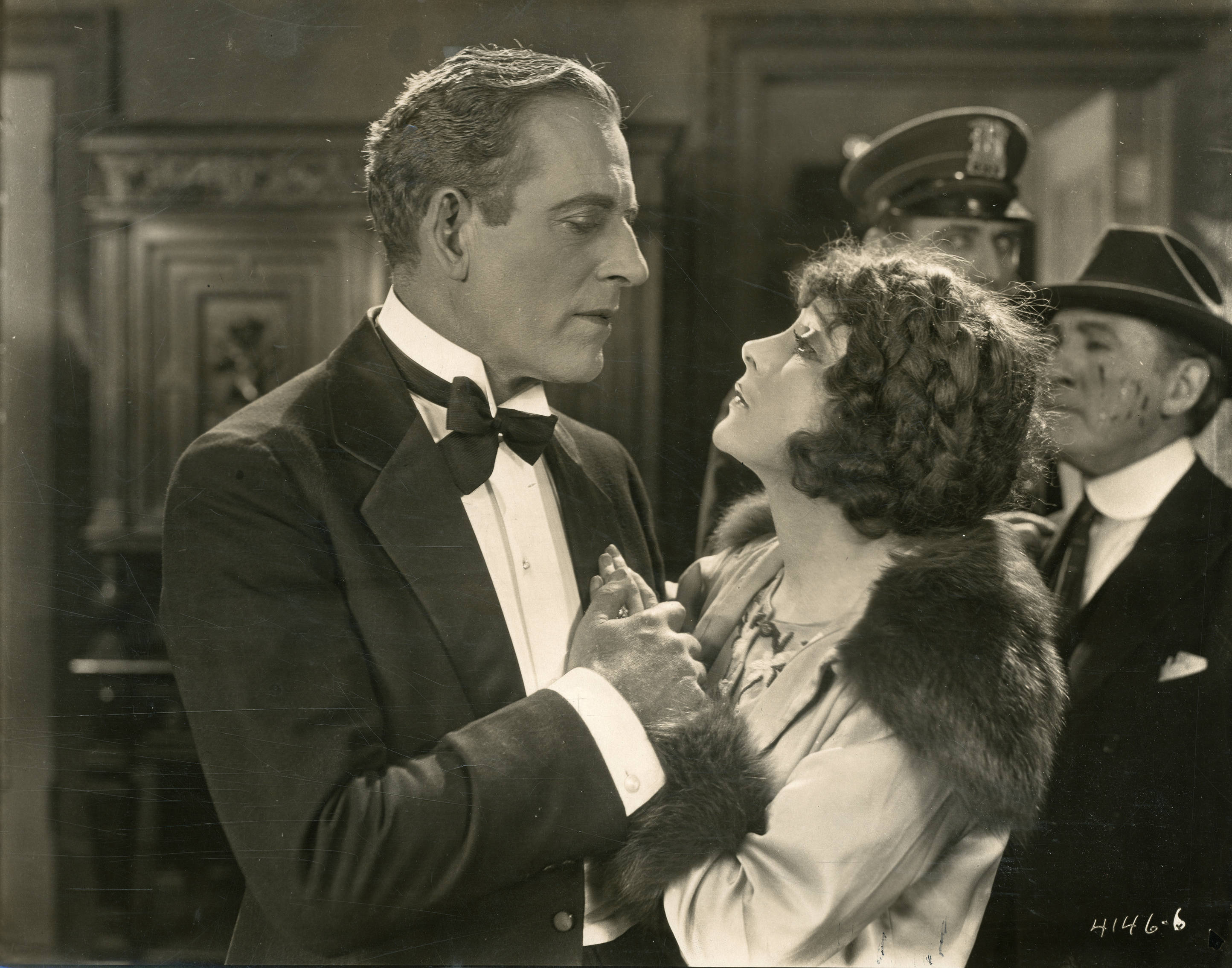
Film still with James Kirkwood and Madge Bellamy

- James Kirkwood as Robert Andrews
- Madge Bellamy as Anne Maynard
- Zasu Pitts as Celia Stebbins
- Rosemary Theby as Margaret Knowles
- Tom Wilson as Thomas Jefferson White
- Tom Ricketts as Jerry Hammond (credited as Thomas Ricketts)
- Arthur Stuart Hull as Lester Knowles
- Tom Guise as Colonel James Constance (credited as Tom S. Guise)
- Edward Cecil as Alfred Austin
- Frederick Cole as Freddy Hammond
- Joseph Singleton as Charles
- Otto Hoffman as Coroner
- Anton Vaverka as Joshua Brown
- Tyrone Brereton as Anne's Brother (uncredited)
- Bull Montana as The Killer (uncredited)
- Arthur Thalasso as Detective Reardon (uncredited)

== Production ==
Consistent with the practice at that time, the comic role of the butler Thomas Jefferson White was played by Wilson in blackface. The use of white actors in blackface for black character roles in Hollywood films did not begin to decline until the late 1930s, and is now considered highly offensive, disrespectful, and racist.

== Preservation ==
For many years, it was believed that Secrets of the Night was a lost film. A partial 16 mm print exists in a private collection, missing the original opening credits and three scenes from the ending. A complete copy of the film was rediscovered by Richard Scott in his basement, a former Winnipegger now living in Mississauga, Ontario. Scott's father used to work at the Eatons department store in Winnipeg; the store had offered a film library, but shut it down in the 1940s and got rid of its stock. His father brought home 15 films and a projector. The films then sat in a box in Scott's basement for 30 years before being rediscovered in early 2017. Upon discovery, Scott contacted the L. Jeffrey Selznick School of Film Preservation at the George Eastman Museum in Rochester, New York, about the films. Museum staff put him in touch with a media archivist at the University of Toronto, who went to Scott's home and picked up the box films to examine back at the school. After a few weeks, the university got back to him; they were going to restore and digitize all the films. The newly restored Secrets of the Night was then screened for Scott and 100 guests at the University of Toronto in March 2017, with pianist Jordan Klapman providing the soundtrack. Klapman performed another accompaniment of the film virtually for the University of Toronto on March 2, 2021.

== See also ==
- List of American films of 1924
- List of rediscovered films
