= Moran of the Mounted =

1926 film

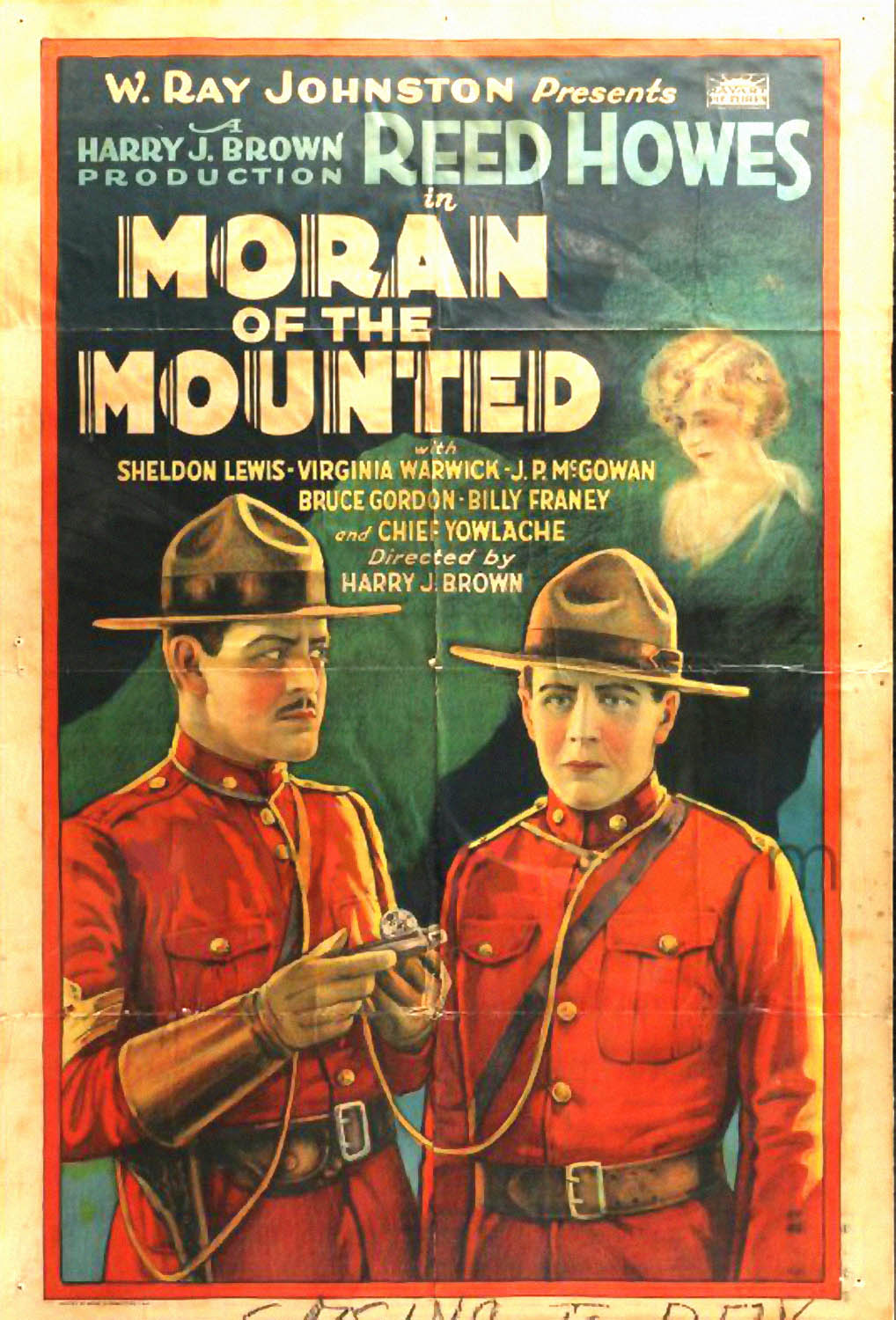
- Directed by: Harry Joe Brown
- Written by: Arthur Q. Hagerman; Jack Natteford
- Produced by: Harry Joe Brown
- Starring: Reed Howes; Sheldon Lewis; Virginia Warwick
- Cinematography: William H. Tuers
- Production company: Harry J. Brown Productions
- Distributed by: Rayart Pictures
- Release date: August 3, 1926
- Running time: 50 minutes
- Country: United States
- Languages: Silent; English intertitles

Moran of the Mounted is a 1926 American silent Western film directed by Harry Joe Brown and starring Reed Howes, Sheldon Lewis and Virginia Warwick. A northern, it was distributed by the independent Rayart Pictures, the forerunner of Monogram Pictures.

== Synopsis ==
Moran, a Mountie, is accused of killing the father of the woman he loves. He is given one week to track down the real culprit.

== Cast ==
- Reed Howes as Moran
- Sheldon Lewis as Lamont
- J.P. McGowan as Sgt. Churchill
- Bruce Gordon as Carlson
- Virginia Warwick as Fleurette
- Billy Franey as 'Mooch' Mullens
- Harry Semels as Dubuc
- Chief Yowlachie as Biting Wolf

== Bibliography ==
- Connelly, Robert B. The Silents: Silent Feature Films, 1910-36, Volume 40, Issue 2. December Press, 1998.
