= Dames Ahoy! =

1930 film by William James Craft

- Directed by: William James Craft
- Written by: Sherman L. Lowe; Albert DeMond; Matt Taylor
- Produced by: Carl Laemmle
- Starring: Glenn Tryon; Otis Harlan; Gertrude Astor
- Cinematography: Alan Jones
- Edited by: Harry W. Lieb
- Production company: Universal Pictures
- Distributed by: Universal Pictures
- Release date: February 9, 1930
- Running time: 64 minutes
- Country: United States
- Language: English

Dames Ahoy! is a 1930 American comedy film directed by William James Craft and starring Glenn Tryon, Otis Harlan, and Gertrude Astor. Produced and distributed by Universal Pictures, it was also released in a silent version.

== Plot ==
The silent version of Dames Ahoy!

Three sailors on shore leave search for a blonde woman who conned one of them out of some money. They encounter a different woman in a dance hall and win a contest.

== Cast ==
- Glenn Tryon as Jimmy Chase
- Helen Wright as Mabel McGuire
- Otis Harlan as Bill Jones
- Eddie Gribbon as Mac Dougal
- Gertrude Astor as the Blonde
- Alice Belcher as parson's wife
- Walter Brennan as side show barker
- Edmund Cobb as marine
- Andy Devine as marine at dance contest
- Robert Dudley as parson
- Franklyn Farnum as master of ceremonies
- Jack Kirk as sailor
