= Poor Girls =

1927 film by William James Craft

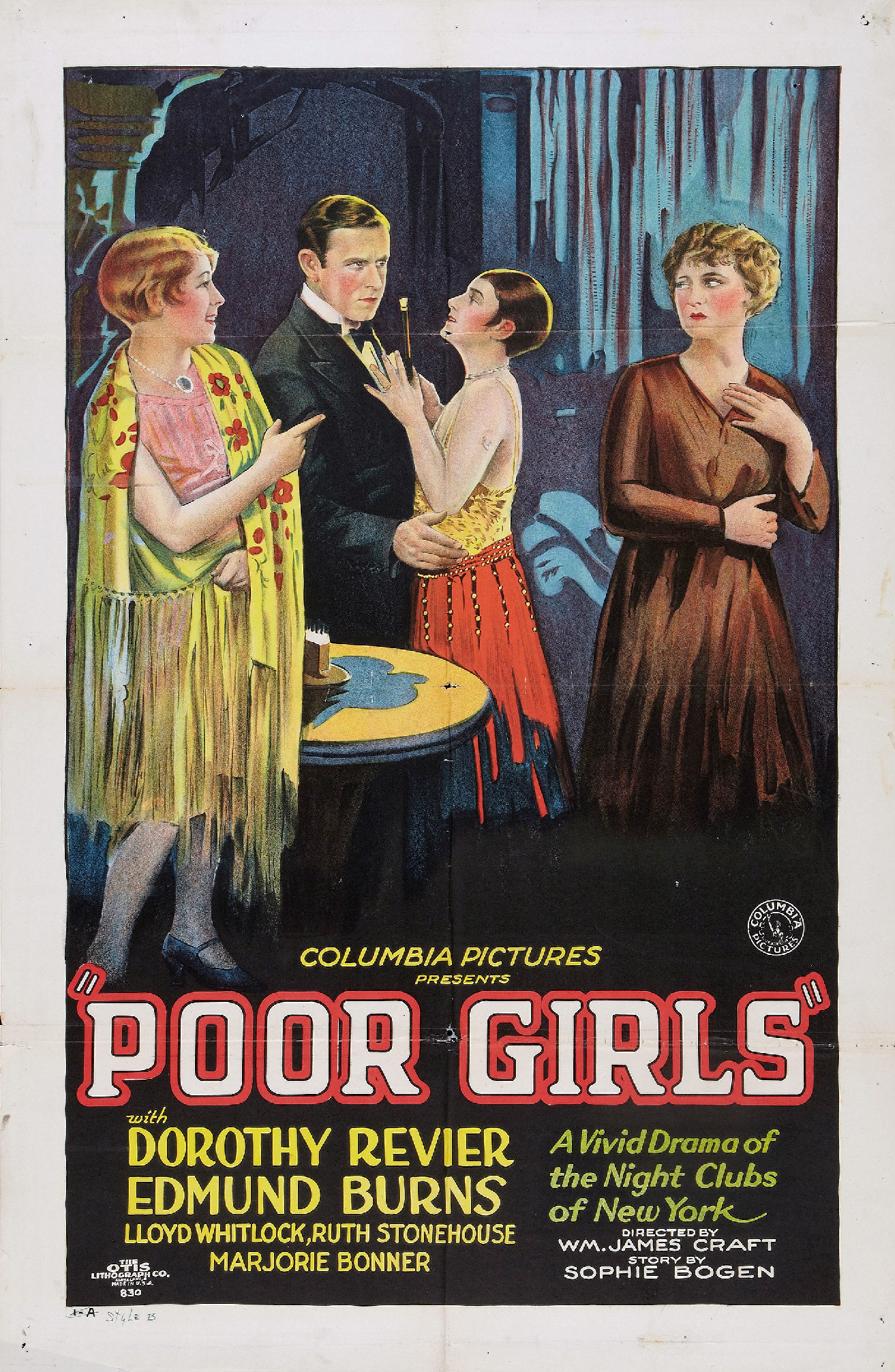
- Film poster
- Directed by: William James Craft
- Based on: original story by William Branch and Sophie Bogen
- Produced by: Harry Cohn
- Starring: Dorothy Revier
- Cinematography: Norbert Brodine
- Distributed by: Columbia Pictures
- Release date: May 5, 1927
- Running time: 58 minutes
- Country: United States
- Language: Silent (English intertitles)

Poor Girls is a 1927 American silent drama film directed by William James Craft and starring Dorothy Revier. It was produced and distributed by Columbia Pictures.

== Cast ==
- Dorothy Revier as Peggy Warren
- Edmund Burns as Richard Deane
- Ruth Stonehouse as Katherine Warren/Texas Kate
- Lloyd Whitlock as Witlard
- Marjorie Bonner as Vivian Stewart

== Preservation ==
The film is preserved in the Library of Congress collections.
