= A Gentleman Roughneck =

1925 film

- Directed by: Grover Jones
- Written by: Grover Jones
- Produced by: Peter Kanellos
- Starring: Frank Merrill; Virginia Warwick; Jack Richardson
- Production company: Hercules Film Productions
- Distributed by: Independent Film Corporation
- Release date: November 1925
- Running time: 50 minutes
- Country: United States
- Languages: Silent; English intertitles

A Gentleman Roughneck is a 1925 American silent action film directed by Grover Jones and starring Frank Merrill, Virginia Warwick and Jack Richardson. The plot revolves around corruption in a lumber camp.

== Cast ==
- Frank Merrill
- Virginia Warwick
- William Conklin
- Jack Richardson
- Murdock MacQuarrie
- William T. Hayes
- Eddie Boland

== Bibliography ==
- Connelly, Robert B. The Silents: Silent Feature Films, 1910-36, Volume 40, Issue 2. December Press, 1998.
- Munden, Kenneth White. The American Film Institute Catalog of Motion Pictures Produced in the United States, Part 1. University of California Press, 1997.
