= 40-Horse Hawkins =

1924 film by Edward Sedgwick

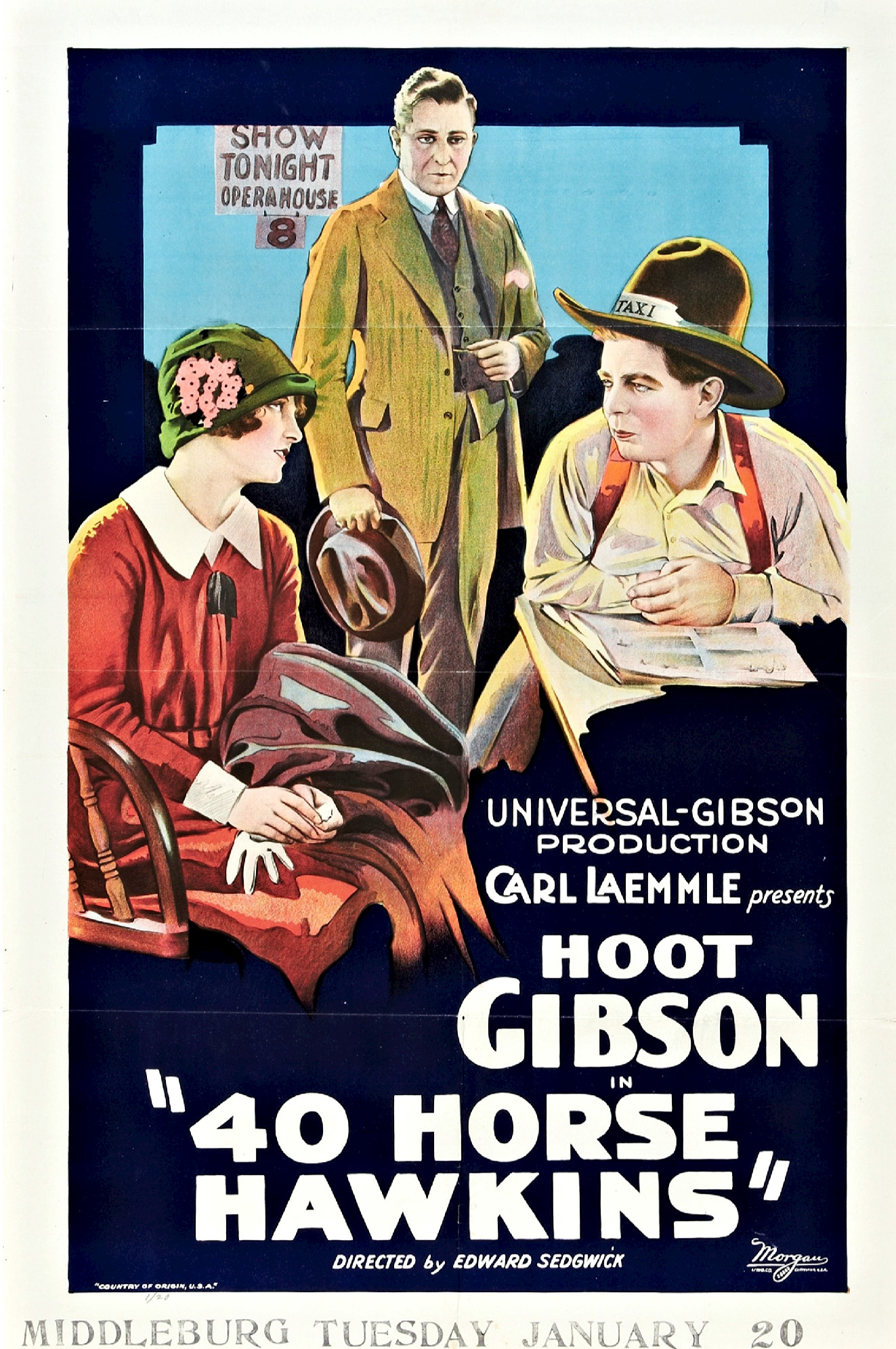
- Film poster
- Directed by: Edward Sedgwick
- Written by: Edward Sedgwick; Raymond L. Schrock
- Based on: story by Edward Sedgwick and Raymond L. Schrock
- Produced by: Carl Laemmle
- Starring: Hoot Gibson
- Cinematography: Virgil Miller
- Distributed by: Universal Pictures
- Release date: April 21, 1924
- Running time: 6 reels
- Country: United States
- Languages: Silent; English intertitles

40-Horse Hawkins is a lost 1924 American silent Western comedy film directed by Edward Sedgwick and starring Hoot Gibson. It was produced and distributed by Universal Pictures.

== Plot ==
Luke Hawkins, a Jack-of-all-trades and resident of the western town of Lariat. An old fashioned theatrical troupe visits the town, and Luke falls in love with its leading lady, Mary Darling.

Luke heads to New York to follow Mary. He takes another series of jobs, and eventually finds work as an extra in Mary's new production. Just as the play is about to flop, Luke's rush to take her in his arms turns the show into a hit.

== Cast ==
- Hoot Gibson as Luke Hawkins
- Anne Cornwall as Mary Darling
- Richard Tucker as Rudolph Catalina
- Helen Holmes as Sylvia Dean
- Jack Gordon Edwards as Johnny
- Edward Burns as Sheriff (not Edmund Burns)
- Edward Sedgwick as State Manager

== Themes ==
40-Horse Hawkins involves several cliches of the day. The Luke Hawkins character is typical of the Western country boy "fish out of water" tale when he finds himself in the city-of-cities, New York. The film offers a nostalgic look at the touring theatre companies of the day, and offers the typical cliche of mustache-twirling villain (Richard Tucker) and a grand leading woman (Helen Holmes).

== See also ==
- Hoot Gibson filmography
- List of American films of 1924
