= George A. Billings =

American actor (1870–1934)

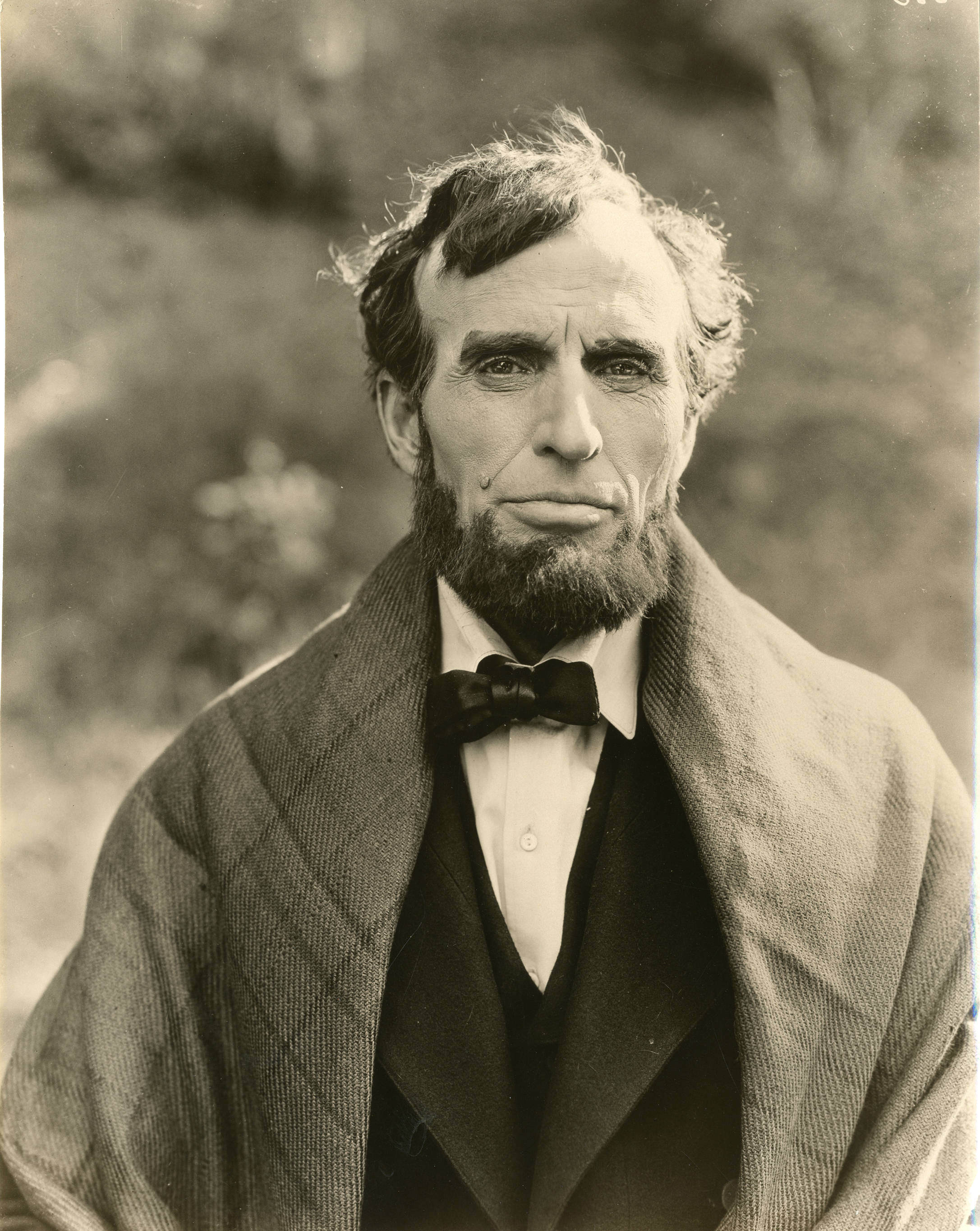
- Billings in The Dramatic Life of Abraham Lincoln (1924)
- Born: November 22, 1870; Preston, Minnesota, US
- Died: April 15, 1934 (aged 63); West Los Angeles, California, US
- Occupations: Film, stage actor
- Years active: 1924–1929

George A. Billings (November 22, 1870 – April 15, 1934) was an American actor noted for his portrayals of Abraham Lincoln in films of the 1920s.

== Biography ==
Born in Preston, Minnesota in 1870, he the son of Henry Orville Billings and Amanda Melvina Warr. Billings was a carpenter for most of his life. While working for the Los Angeles City Department, he heard Al and Ray Rockett were looking for a man that resembled Lincoln for the 1924 film The Dramatic Life of Abraham Lincoln. He was hired for the film, despite a lack of prior acting experience, due to his striking resemblance to Lincoln, even down to the mole on his face. Billings went on to portray Lincoln in several more films.

In 1927, he also toured the mid-western United States playing Lincoln in a two-man play with Henry Fonda. Things started out well, but Fonda finally quit due to Billings prodigious drinking. It was Fonda's first professional job as an actor.

== Filmography (all roles playing Abraham Lincoln) ==
- The Dramatic Life of Abraham Lincoln (1924)
- Barbara Frietchie (1924)
- The Man Without a Country (1925)
- Hands Up! (1926)
- Lincoln (1929) (10-minute sound short)
