= Reckless Speed =

1924 film

- Directed by: William James Craft
- Written by: William E. Wing
- Produced by: Peter Kanellos
- Starring: Frank Merrill; Virginia Warwick; Joseph W. Girard
- Production company: Hercules Film Productions
- Distributed by: Bud Barsky Corporation
- Release date: October 9, 1924
- Running time: 50 minutes
- Country: United States
- Languages: Silent; English intertitles

Reckless Speed is a lost 1924 American silent action film directed by William James Craft and starring Frank Merrill, Virginia Warwick and Joseph W. Girard.

== Synopsis ==
The son of an oil magnate discovers that the foreman of their works is secretly in league with a rival company. He joins forces with a female reporter to expose the wrongdoers.

== Cast ==
- Frank Merrill as Speed Creswell
- Virginia Warwick as Vera Wray
- Joseph W. Girard as Dad Creswell
- Gino Corrado as David Brierly
- Eddie O'Brien as Creswell's valet
- Slim Cole as Mr. Jackson

== Preservation ==
With no holdings located in archives, Reckless Speed is considered a lost film.

== Bibliography ==
- Connelly, Robert B. The Silents: Silent Feature Films, 1910-36, Volume 40, Issue 2. December Press, 1998.
- Munden, Kenneth White. The American Film Institute Catalog of Motion Pictures Produced in the United States, Part 1. University of California Press, 1997.
