= Pioneer's Gold =

1924 film

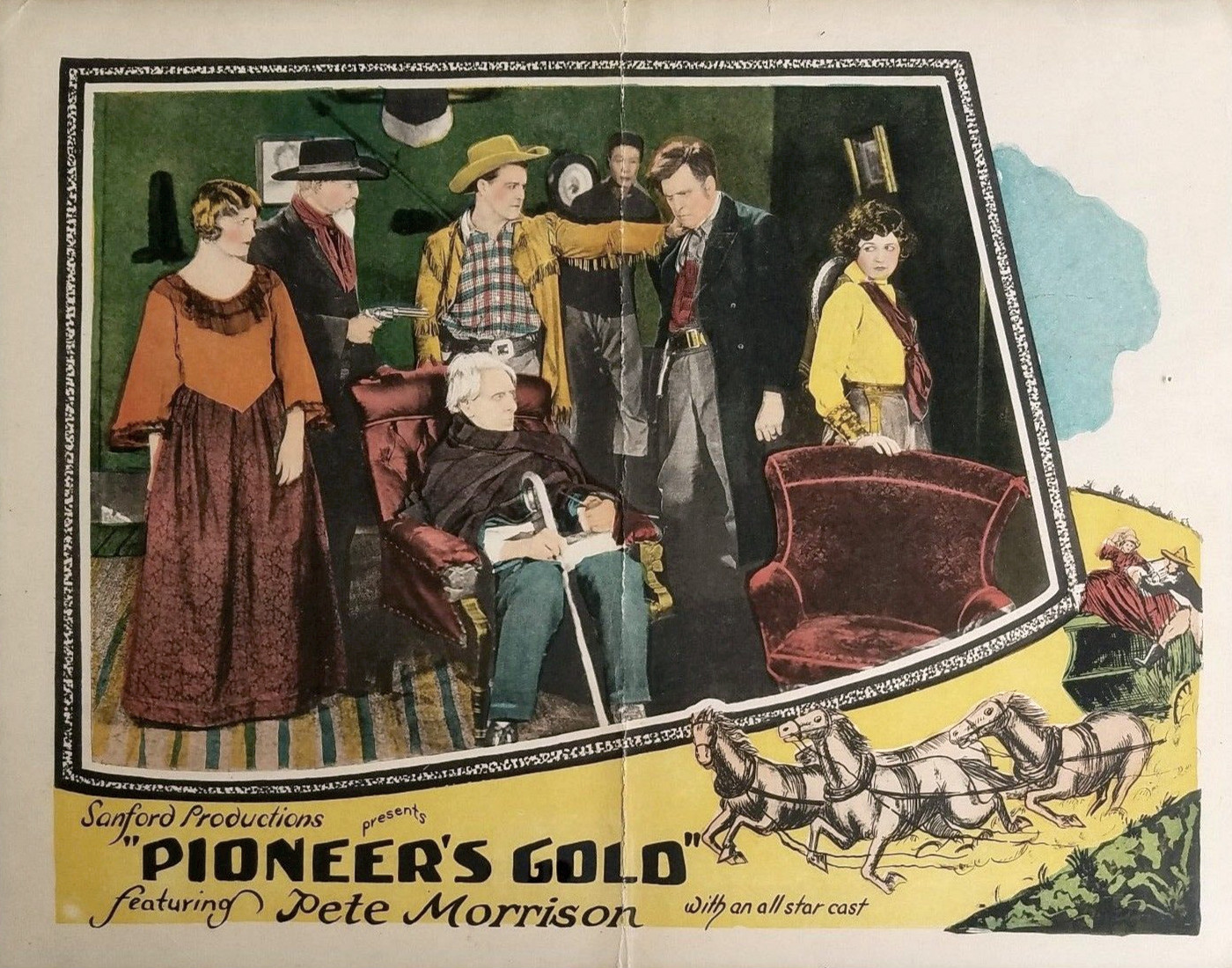
- Directed by: Victor Adamson
- Written by: William Berke
- Produced by: F. M. Sanford
- Starring: Kathryn McGuire; Pete Morrison; Virginia Warwick
- Production company: Sanford Productions
- Distributed by: Sanford Productions
- Release date: April 1, 1924
- Running time: 64 minutes
- Country: United States
- Languages: Silent; English intertitles

Pioneer's Gold is a 1924 American silent Western film directed by Victor Adamson and starring Kathryn McGuire, Pete Morrison and Virginia Warwick. It was produced by the independent Sanford Productions.

== Synopsis ==
An elderly prospector wants his brother's children to inherit his vast wealth, but a scheming figure plans to bring in two impersonators so he can get his own hands on the inheritance.

== Cast ==
- Kathryn McGuire as Mary Marsden
- Pete Morrison as Jim Hartley
- Virginia Warwick as Marie La Monte
- Spottiswoode Aitken as Bob Hartley
- Louise Emmons as Mother La Monte
- Madge Lorese Bates as Goldie
- Merrill McCormick as Pascale
- Les Bates as Jeff Kerr aka The Fox
- George King as Tsu Tsi
- George Sowards as Stage driver

== Bibliography ==
- Connelly, Robert B. The Silents: Silent Feature Films, 1910-36, Volume 40, Issue 2. December Press, 1998.
- Munden, Kenneth White. The American Film Institute Catalog of Motion Pictures Produced in the United States, Part 1. University of California Press, 1997.
