= Abraham Lincoln (1924 film) =

1924 film

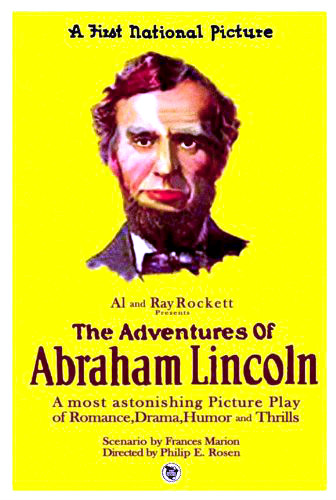
- Film poster
- Directed by: Phil Rosen
- Written by: Frances Marion (story and screenplay)
- Produced by: Al Rockett; Ray Rockett
- Starring: George A. Billings; Ruth Clifford; Irene Hunt; Louise Fazenda
- Cinematography: H. Lyman Broening; Robert Kurrle
- Music by: Joseph Carl Breil
- Production company: Rockett-Lincoln Productions
- Distributed by: Associated First National
- Release dates: January 21, 1924 (New York City premiere); February 2, 1924 (U.S.)
- Running time: 120 minutes (12 reels); 150 minutes (15 reels) at NYC premiere
- Country: United States
- Language: Silent (English intertitles)

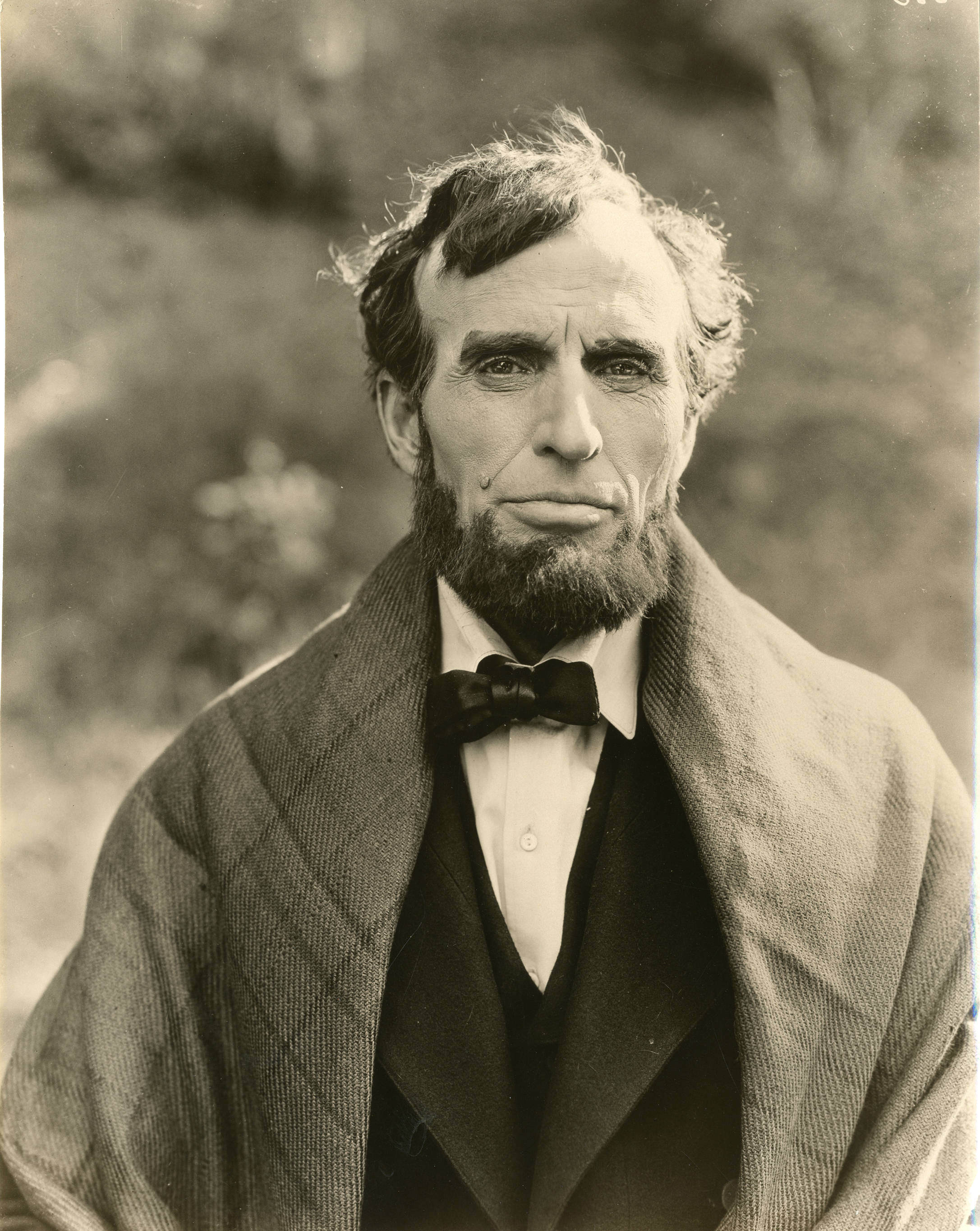
George Billings

The Dramatic Life of Abraham Lincoln is a 1924 American silent historical drama film directed by Phil Rosen and written by Frances Marion. By the date of release, the film's title was shortened to Abraham Lincoln, since the previous title was regarded as cumbersome.

== Cast ==
- George A. Billings as Abraham Lincoln
- Danny Hoy as Lincoln as a boy
- Ruth Clifford as Ann Rutledge
- Irene Hunt as Nancy Hanks Lincoln
- Fay McKenzie as Sarah Lincoln
- Westcott Clarke as Thomas Lincoln
- Charles K. French as Isom Enlow
- William J. Humphrey as Stephen A. Douglas
- A. Edward Sutherland as William Scott (billed as Eddie Sutherland)
- Louise Fazenda as Sally
- William F. Moran as John Wilkes Booth
- Walter Rogers as Gen. Ulysses S. Grant
- James Welch as Gen. Robert E. Lee
- Willis Marks as Secretary of State William H. Seward
- Fred Kohler as New Orleans slave auctioneer
- Pat Hartigan as Jack Armstrong
- Otis Harlan as Denton Offutt
- Jules Hanft as James Rutledge
- Julia Hesse as Mrs. Rutledge
- Robert Bolder as country politician
- William McIllwain as Dr. Allen
- Robert Milasch as Southern planter
- George Reehm as Southern planter
- Genevieve Blinn as Mrs. Ninian Edwards, Mary's sister
- Mickey Moore as Willie Lincoln
- Newton Hall as Tad Lincoln
- Francis Powers as Richard J. Oglesby
- Homer Willits as John Hay, Lincoln's secretary
- Jim Blackwell as Tom
- Frances Raymond as Scott's mother
- Jack Rollings as Union sentry
- Merrill McCormick as corporal of the guard (billed as William McCormick)
- Frank Newburg as Bixby
- W. John Steppling as delegation chairman
- Wanda Crazer as dancer
- Alfred Allen as General George Meade
- Miles McCarthy as Major/General Robert Anderson
- Earl Schenck as Colonel Henry Rathbone
- Dolly McLean as Miss Harris
- Cordelia Callahan as Mrs. Surratt
- Dallas Hope as stable boy
- Dick Johnson as bartender
- Jack Winn as Ned Spangler
- Lawrence Grant as actor at Ford's Theatre
- Ivy Livingston as actress at Ford's Theatre
- Kathleen Chambers as actress at Ford's Theatre
- Henry Rattenberry as stagehand
- W. L. McPheeters as Secret Service Chief Allan Pinkerton
- Nick Cogley as Secretary of War Simon Cameron
- Charles Smiley as Secretary of the Treasury Salmon P. Chase
- R. G. Dixon as Secretary of the Navy Gideon Welles
- Harry Kelsey as Secretary of the Interior Caleb B. Smith
- Joseph S. Mills as Postmaster-General Montgomery Blair
- Fred Manly as Attorney-General Edward Bates
- William von Hardenburg as Attorney-General James Speed
- R. J. Duston as Postmaster-General William Dennison, Jr.

== Awards ==
The movie won the Photoplay Medal of Honor for 1924 given out by Photoplay Magazine, the most prestigious American film award of its time.

== Preservation ==
An abridged, two-reel version of Abraham Lincoln is held by the National Film and Sound Archive in Canberra. The incomplete print is on 35mm and is color-tinted and color-toned. As the film's original length was twelve reels, it is considered a lost film.

== See also ==
- Cultural depictions of Abraham Lincoln
- List of films and television shows about the American Civil War
- List of incomplete or partially lost films
- List of actors who have played the President of the United States of America
