= William James Craft =

Canadian film director

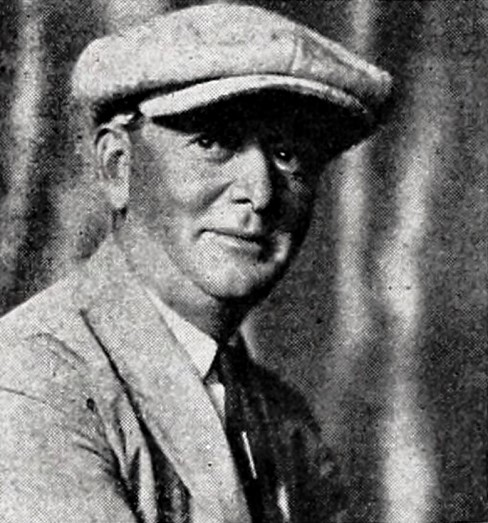
- From a 1925 magazine
- Born: 1886; Toronto, Ontario, Canada
- Died: 30 June 1931 (aged 44–45); Hollywood, California, US
- Occupations: Film director, screenwriter
- Years active: 1910–1931

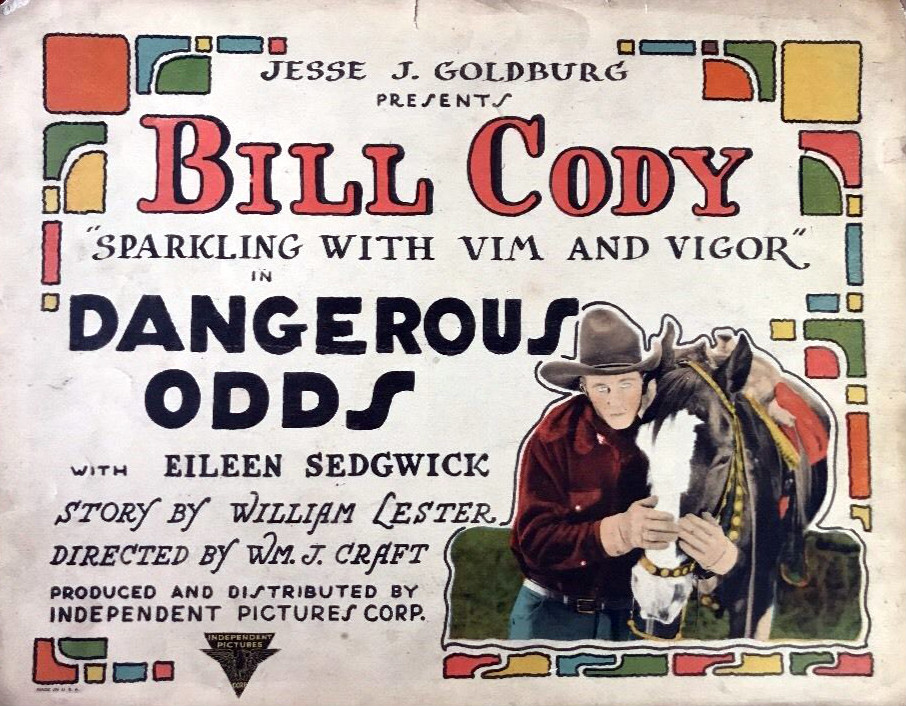
Dangerous Odds lobby card, a film directed by William James Craft (1925)

William James Craft (1886 – 30 June 1931) was a Canadian film director and screenwriter. He directed more than 60 films between 1910 and 1931. He is also credited with writing for 12 films between 1920 and 1928. Craft was born in Toronto and died in 1931 from injuries received in an auto accident.

== Partial filmography ==
- Who Was the Man? (1921)
- Crossed Clues (1921)
- Cameron of the Royal Mounted (1921)
- Double Crossers (1921)
- God's Crucible (1921) (writer)
- With Stanley in Africa (1922)
- Another Man's Boots (1922)
- Headin' West (1922)
- In the Days of Daniel Boone (1923)
- Beasts of Paradise (1923)
- The Riddle Rider (1924)
- South of the Equator (1924)
- Reckless Speed (1924)
- Battling Mason (1924)
- Galloping Vengeance (1925)
- That Man Jack! (1925)
- The Bloodhound (1925)
- The Radio Detective (1926)
- The Silent Flyer (1926)
- The Galloping Cowboy (1926)
- The Power of the Weak (1926)
- King of the Saddle (1926)
- The Wreck (1927)
- Birds of Prey (1927)
- The Arizona Whirlwind (1927)
- Poor Girls (1927)
- The Clown (1927)
- Hot Heels (1927)
- A Hero for a Night (1927)
- How to Handle Women (1928)
- The Gate Crasher (1928)
- The Kid's Clever (1929)
- One Hysterical Night (1929)
- Skinner Steps Out (1929)
- The Cohens and the Kellys in Atlantic City (1929)
- Embarrassing Moments (1930)
- Dames Ahoy! (1930)
- The Cohens and the Kellys in Scotland (1930)
- The Czar of Broadway (1930)
- See America Thirst (1930)
- The Little Accident (1930)
- Honeymoon Lane (1931)
- The Runaround (1931)
