= The Danger Rider (1924 film) =

1924 film directed by Denver Dixon

- Directed by: Denver Dixon
- Produced by: Denver Dixon
- Starring: Art Mix; Virginia Warwick; Dorothy Lee
- Production company: Art Mix Productions
- Release date: December 26, 1924 (US)
- Running time: 5 reels
- Country: United States
- Language: English

The Danger Rider is a 1924 American silent film directed by Denver Dixon, and starring Art Mix, Virginia Warwick and Dorothy Lee. It premiered on September 29, 1924, in Linton, Indiana.

== Cast list ==
- Art Mix
- Virginia Warwick
- Dorothy Lee
- Harry Tenbrook
- Dick La Reno

== Reception ==
The St. Joseph Gazette gave the film a good review, stating that the picture "gave the audience plenty of thrills". The Missouri Valley Independent also enjoyed the movie, calling it a "forceful and interesting Western picture," "full of thrilling incidents and stirring action."
