= Paul Bern =

German-born American film director, screenwriter, and producer (1889–1932)

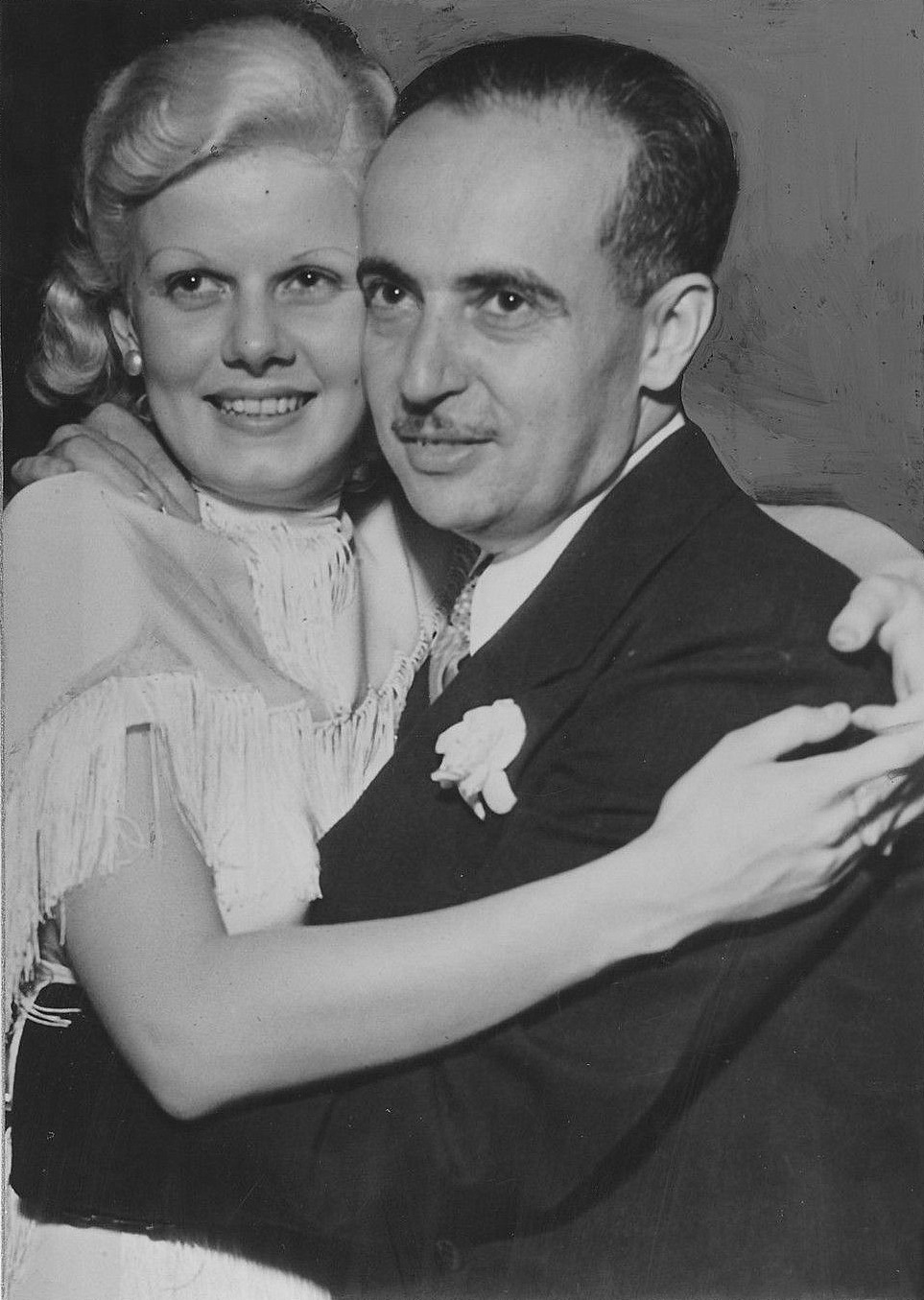
- Jean Harlow and Paul Bern in 1932
- Born: Paul Levy; December 3, 1889; Wandsbek, Schleswig-Holstein, German Empire (present day Hamburg, Germany)
- Died: September 5, 1932 (aged 42); Beverly Hills, California, U.S.
- Cause of death: Gunshot wound, ruled a suicide by coroner
- Resting place: Inglewood Park Cemetery
- Occupations: Screenwriter, director, producer
- Years active: 1919–1932
- Spouse: Jean Harlow (m. 1932)
- Partner: Dorothy Millette (born Adele Roddy)(1911–1920)

Paul Bern (né Levy; December 3, 1889 – September 5, 1932) was a German-born American film director, screenwriter and producer for Metro-Goldwyn-Mayer (MGM), where he became the assistant to producer Irving Thalberg. He helped launch the career of Jean Harlow, whom he married in July 1932; two months later, he was found dead of a gunshot wound, leaving what appeared to be a suicide note. Various alternative theories of his death have been proposed. MGM writer and film producer Samuel Marx believed that he was killed by his ex-common-law wife Dorothy Millette, who jumped to her death from a ferry two days afterward.

== Early life and career ==
Paul Bern was born Paul Levy in Wandsbek, which was then a town in the Prussian province of Schleswig-Holstein (now a district of the city of Hamburg). He was one of six children of Julius and Henriette (née Hirsch) Levy, a Jewish couple. Bern's father worked as a clerk for a shipping company before opening a candy store. In 1898 he decided to move the family to the United States due to the rise of unemployment and anti-Jewish attitudes in Wandsbek. The family eventually settled in New York City. Bern's father died in 1908; his mother drowned herself in 1920, possibly as a threat to keep her beloved son from marrying.

In adulthood, Bern pursued a career in acting on the stage and studied at the American Academy of Dramatic Arts. He later adopted the stage name "Paul Bern." Bern soon realized he had little aptitude for acting and pursued other aspects of theater production, working as a stage manager on Broadway for a time before moving to Hollywood in the early 1920s. He was initially a film editor before working his way up to scenario writing and directing for United Artists and Paramount Pictures. This led to his working full-time as a producer at Metro-Goldwyn-Mayer (MGM), the major studio of the time. Bern eventually became the production assistant of Irving Thalberg and then a producer on the MGM lot in his own right.

The star-studded film Grand Hotel, released six days after Bern's death, won the Academy Award for Best Picture for 1931–1932. Bern and Thalberg produced the film, although neither was listed in the credits (which wasn't common practice for MGM pictures during the period). The award was presented solely to Thalberg, however, since Bern, being deceased, obviously could not also accept it.

== Personal life ==
In the 1920s, Bern fell in love with actress Barbara La Marr. She did not reciprocate his feelings, but the two remained close friends and confidants. Bern assisted La Marr with her career and paid for her medical and funeral expenses. Bern was also godfather to her son Don Gallery, and actress Jean Harlow was his godmother. Although Bern was rumored to be Donald Gallery's biological father, a DNA test later disproved this.

While living in New York, Bern lived with his common-law wife Dorothy Millette (born Adele Roddy). The two had met in Toronto and their relationship began around 1911. Bern financially supported Millette, who reportedly had a mental illness and ended up in a sanatorium in Connecticut. Millette traveled to Los Angeles in September 1932, where she reportedly visited Bern on the night of his death. Her body was found in the Sacramento River two days after Bern's death. It was later determined that she had committed suicide by jumping from the steamboat Delta King.

Bern met Harlow shortly before the premiere of Hell's Angels in 1930. Bern was instrumental in helping Harlow's career, as he was the only person who took her seriously as an actress. The two struck up a friendship and eventually began dating. They announced their engagement in June 1932 and married on July 2 of that year.

== Death ==
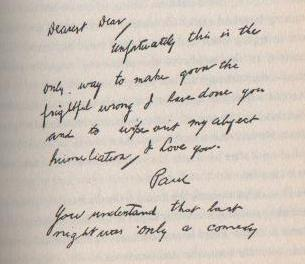
Note signed "Paul" discovered by police after his death, viewed by authorities as a suicide note but authenticity of the note remains questionable

Two months after marrying Harlow, on September 5, 1932, Bern was found dead from a gunshot wound to the head in their home on Easton Drive in Beverly Hills, California. The coroner ruled Bern's death a suicide.

Police discovered a note at the scene that read as follows:

"Dearest Dear,
Unfortuately [sic] this is the only way to make good the frightful wrong I have done you and to wipe out my abject humiliation, I Love [sic] you.
Paul
You understand that last night was only a comedy"

Authorities viewed this as a suicide note signed by Bern. To the police, and before a grand jury, Harlow's only statement was that she "knew nothing." She was made an executor of her husband's estate by Judge May Darlington Lahey. She never publicly spoke on the matter, and later died of renal failure (caused by a childhood bout of scarlet fever) in June 1937 at the age of 26.

Two-thousand people attended Bern's funeral, held on September 9, at the Grace Chapel at Inglewood Park Cemetery. Conrad Nagel delivered the eulogy. Bern was cremated, and his ashes were interred in the Golden West Mausoleum at Inglewood Park Cemetery.

=== Investigation reopened, 1960 ===
In the November 1960 issue of Playboy magazine, screenwriter Ben Hecht questioned the official verdict of Bern's death, causing renewed interest in the case. Hecht suggested that Bern was murdered by an unnamed woman and that the investigation into the killing was a "suicide whitewash." He went on to say that the explanation of Bern's suicide "would be less a black eye for their [MGM's] biggest movie making heroine. It might crimp her [Harlow's] box office allure to have her blazoned as a wife who couldn't hold her husband." The article prompted Los Angeles County District Attorney William B. McKesson to reopen the case, but McKesson later closed it, stating, "When I ordered the record check I assumed Hecht was still a responsible reporter. It now appears ... that he apparently was peddling a wild and unconfirmed rumor as fact."

=== Alternative theories ===
In 1990, film producer Samuel Marx, a friend and colleague of both Bern and Irving Thalberg, published a book giving a different version of Bern's death. Marx, at the time the head of MGM's screenwriting department, said he had gone to Bern's house in the early morning of September 5, before the police were notified of the body's discovery, and had seen Thalberg tampering with evidence. The next day, he had been among the studio executives who were told by Louis B. Mayer that the case would have to be ruled "suicide because of impotence" in order to avoid a scandal which would have finished Harlow's film career. Marx, after reviewing the evidence, concluded that Bern was murdered by his former common-law wife Dorothy Millette, who then died by suicide by drowning two days later. In a 1974 interview, Henry Hathaway (who also worked under Bern) concurred with Marx's findings, stating that MGM felt it was better off in challenging Bern's masculinity and make Harlow out as an "innocent dupe" rather than a party to bigamy.

== Popular culture ==
He was played by Peter Lawford in the 1965 film Harlow.

== Selected filmography ==
=== Director ===
- Head over Heels (1922)
- Open All Night (1924)
- The Dressmaker from Paris (1925)
- Flower of Night (1925)
- The Woman Racket (uncredited, 1930)

=== Producer ===
- Geraldine (1929)
- Noisy Neighbors (1929)
- Square Shoulders (1929)
- Anna Christie (1930)

=== Writer ===
- Greater Than Love (1919)
- The Marriage Circle (1924)
- Men (1924)
- Prince of Tempters (1926)
- The Beloved Rogue (1927)
- The Dove (1927)
- Grand Hotel (1932)

== See also ==
- List of unsolved deaths

== Footnote ==
- Samuel Marx and Joyce Vanderveen: Deadly Illusions (Random House, New York, 1990), re-published as Murder Hollywood Style - Who Killed Jean Harlow's Husband? (Arrow, 1994, ISBN 0-09-961060-4)
