= South of the Equator =

1924 film

- Directed by: William James Craft
- Written by: Robert Dillon
- Produced by: Bud Barsky
- Starring: Kenneth MacDonald; Virginia Warwick; Gino Corrado
- Production company: Bud Barsky Corporation
- Distributed by: Bud Barsky Corporation; Woolf and Freedman (UK)
- Release date: October 10, 1924
- Running time: 50 minutes
- Country: United States
- Languages: Silent; English intertitles

South of the Equator is a 1924 American silent comedy adventure film directed by William James Craft and starring Kenneth MacDonald, Virginia Warwick and Gino Corrado.

== Synopsis ==
The daughter of the democratically elected president of a South American country travels to America in order to secure arms supplies to resist an insurgency in her native country. In New York henchman of the revolutionary movement attempt to thwart her mission, but she is rescued by a young America John Dunlap. He then travels back with her to South America.

== Cast ==
- Kenneth MacDonald as John Dunlap
- Virginia Warwick as Clara Montavlo
- Gino Corrado as Presidente Montavlo
- Martin Turner as The Young Man's Friend
- Alphonse Martell as The General's Aide
- Robert Barnes as The Officer

== Bibliography ==
- Connelly, Robert B. The Silents: Silent Feature Films, 1910-36, Volume 40, Issue 2. December Press, 1998.
- Munden, Kenneth White. The American Film Institute Catalog of Motion Pictures Produced in the United States, Part 1. University of California Press, 1997.
