= The Rose of Paris =

1924 film by Irving Cummings

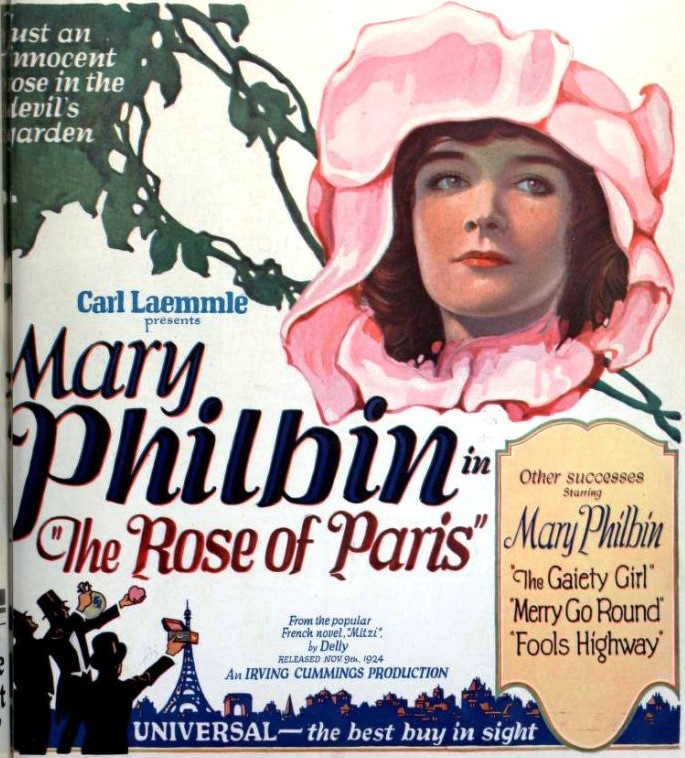
- Advertisement
- Directed by: Irving Cummings
- Screenplay by: Melville W. Brown; Edward T. Lowe Jr. Lenore Coffee; Bernard McConville
- Based on: Mitsi by Ethel M. Dell
- Starring: Mary Philbin; Robert Cain; John St. Polis; Rose Dione; Dorothy Revier; Gino Corrado
- Cinematography: Charles J. Stumar
- Production company: Universal Pictures
- Distributed by: Universal Pictures
- Release date: November 9, 1924
- Running time: 70 minutes
- Country: United States
- Languages: Silent; English intertitles

The Rose of Paris is a 1924 American silent drama film directed by Irving Cummings and written by Melville W. Brown, Edward T. Lowe Jr., Lenore Coffee, and Bernard McConville. It is based on the 1922 novel Mitsi by Ethel M. Dell. The film stars Mary Philbin, Robert Cain, John St. Polis, Rose Dione, Dorothy Revier, and Gino Corrado. The film was released on November 9, 1924, by Universal Pictures.

== Plot ==
As described in a film magazine, unaware of her ancestry, knowing only that she had been told that in her infancy her mother died, Mitsi is a beautiful young French woman leading a happy life in a convent. One day a young man comes to the convent bringing with him to be his adopted daughter the child of a friend who had died. Mitsi and the child were firm friends and their parting was touching. Came another day when to the convent came a woman saying she was the friend of the girl's mother and had come to take the girl away, which she did, to a room over a squalid cafe frequented by the Apaches of Paris. The woman was actuated by the money promised her by the business partner of the child's grandfather, who, on his death bed, pledged this partner to find the daughter the old man had disowned because of her marriage. Horrified by her surroundings, Mitsi escapes and goes to the great estate where her little convent friend had been taken. There she becomes a servant, but her beauty subjects her to abhorrent attentions. Through various incidents Mitsi again finds herself in the power of the woman who has taken her from the convent. Just as she decides that death is her only relief, there comes greater happiness than ever she had conceived for herself, and she comes into her heritage of love and inheritance of fortune.

== Cast ==
- Mary Philbin as Mitsi
- Robert Cain as Christian
- John St. Polis as André du Vallois
- Rose Dione as Madame Bolomoff
- Dorothy Revier as Florine du Vallois
- Gino Corrado as Paul Maran
- Doreen Turner as Yvette
- Ed Brady as Jules
- Károly Huszár as Victor
- Carrie Daumery as Mother Superior
- Cesare Gravina as George
- Alice H. Smith as Governess
- Frank Currier as George Der Vroo
- D. Mitsoras as Major Domo

== Preservation ==
An incomplete print of The Rose of Paris is maintained in the George Eastman Museum Motion Picture Collection.
