= Gino Corrado =

Italian actor (1893–1982)

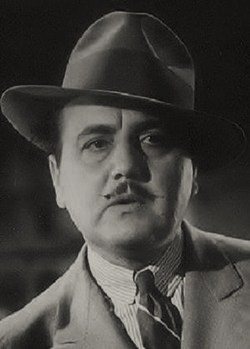
- Corrado in Algiers (1938)
- Born: Gino Corrado Liserani; 9 February 1893; Florence, Italy
- Died: 23 December 1982 (aged 89); Los Angeles, California, U.S.
- Occupation: Actor
- Years active: 1916–1954
- Spouse: Anna Lina Alberti (m. 1931)

Gino Corrado (born Gino Liserani; 9 February 1893 – 23 December 1982) was an Italian-born film actor. He appeared in more than 400 films between 1916 and 1954, almost always in small roles as a character actor. From 1916 to 1923, he was known as Eugene Corey, which was an Anglicized version of his name.

== Career ==
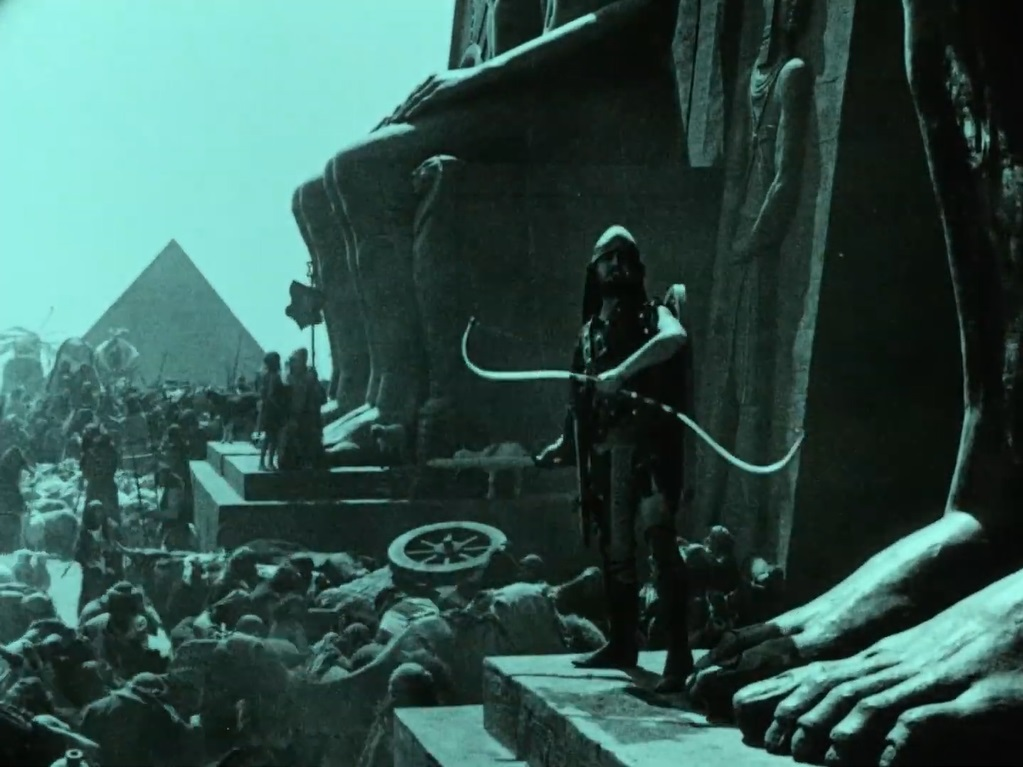
Corrado as Joshua in Cecil B. DeMille's The Ten Commandments (1923)

Born in Florence, Italy, Corrado is considered to have one of the most impressive filmographies of any actor; for example, he is the only actor to appear in Gone With The Wind, Citizen Kane and Casablanca, three of the leading films of Hollywood's Golden Age. He played Aramis in The Iron Mask (1929). He made his film debut in D. W. Griffith's Intolerance in 1916, and appeared in such other silent classics as The Ten Commandments and Sunrise. By the time sound arrived, he had already been reduced to a bit player, but worked constantly (making 18 appearances just in 1939) and was always a welcome presence. Corrado made an appearance in the Our Gang short "Follies of 1938" (released in 1937). He is especially known by Three Stooges fans for his appearances in Saved by the Belle, An Ache in Every Stake and Micro-Phonies. His final film role was a shoe salesman in the 1954 Martin and Lewis comedy Living It Up.

His younger brother was the silent film actor Louis Dumar (born as Luigi Liserani).

Corrado became a restaurateur following the end of his film career. ‘Gino’s’, his place on Ventura Blvd., was highly thought of, and drew many in the film industry. Gino later lost the restaurant, due to what he said was fraud.

== Death ==
Corrado died at the Motion Picture and Television Country House in Woodland Hills, California, on 23 December 1982 at age 89. His grave is located at Valhalla Memorial Park Cemetery, and his gravestone epitaph is etched with Corrado's image from the classic Three Stooges short, Micro-Phonies, with the inscription, "Forever On The Screen — Forever In Our Hearts".

== Selected filmography ==
- Gretchen the Greenhorn (1916) – Wedding Guest (uncredited)
- Intolerance (1916) – The Runner (uncredited)
- Forbidden Paths (1917) – A Mexican Flirt (uncredited)
- The Gown of Destiny (1917) – in French Consulate office
- The Flames of Chance (1918) – Anatole
- The Argument (1918) – John Corbin Jr.
- The Velvet Hand (1918)
- The Hopper (1918) – Roger Livingston Talbot
- Restitution (1918) – Adam
- A Roman Scandal (1919, Short)
- The Great Lover (1920) – Secretary
- The Guttersnipe (1922) – Clarence Phillips
- Beyond the Rocks (1922) – Guest at Alpine Inn (uncredited)
- The Ordeal (1922) – Gene
- My American Wife (1922) – Pedro DeGrossa
- Slander the Woman (1923) – Tetreau, the Guide
- Adam's Rib (1923) – Lt. Braschek
- The Spanish Dancer (1923) – Musketeer (uncredited)
- Flaming Youth (1923) – Leo Stenak
- The Ten Commandments (1923) – Israelite Slave (uncredited)
- The Thrill Chaser (1923) – Rudolph Biggeddo
- Men (1924) – The Stranger
- Reckless Speed (1924) – David Brierly
- South of the Equator (1924) – The General
- The Rose of Paris (1924) – Paul Maran
- He Who Laughs Last (1925) – Elwood Harkness
- The Coast Patrol (1925) – Eric Marmont
- The Desert Flower (1925) – José Lee
- Off the Highway (1925) – Rabbitt
- Speed Madness (1925)
- Without Mercy (1925) – Malay Jack (uncredited)
- Away in the Lead (1925)
- Never Too Late (1925) – Count Gaston La Rue
- La Bohème (1926) – Marcel
- The Volga Boatman (1926) – White Army Officer (uncredited)
- Modern Youth (1926)
- The Dead Line (1926) – Juan Álavarez
- The Amateur Gentleman (1926) – Prince Regent
- The Little Firebrand (1926) – Adonis Wenhoff
- Bardelys the Magnificent (1926) – Dueling Husband (uncredited)
- Gigolo (1926) – Hotel Crillon Desk Clerk (uncredited)
- The White Black Sheep (1926) – El Rahib
- Uneasy Payments (1927) – Bozoni
- Paid to Love (1927) – Tour Director (uncredited)
- Sunrise (1927) – Manager of Hair Salon (uncredited)
- Women's Wares (1927) – Modiste
- The Cohens and the Kellys in Paris (1928) – Pierre
- The Devil's Skipper (1928) – Philip La Farge
- The House of Scandal (1928) – Morgan
- The Charge of the Gauchos (1928) – Moreno
- The Gun Runner (1928) – Garcia
- Fazil (1928) – Sultan's Messenger (uncredited)
- Prowlers of the Sea (1928) – The Skipper
- The Rainbow (1929) – Slug
- The Iron Mask (1929) – Aramis
- Tide of Empire (1929) – Carlos Montalvo (uncredited)
- The One Woman Idea (1929) – Bordinnas
- Señor Americano (1929) – Carlos Ramirez
- Navy Blues (1929) – Headwaiter at Garden Cabaret (uncredited)
- Lord Byron of Broadway (1930) – Riccardi
- Those Who Dance (1930) – Tony
- A Notorious Affair (1930) – Serge – Pianist (uncredited)
- The Czar of Broadway (1930) – El Dorado Club Headwaiter (uncredited)
- Song of the Caballero (1930) – Don Jose Madero
- Oh Sailor Behave (1930) – Stephan
- Sin Takes a Holiday (1930) – Dressmaker (uncredited)
- Oh, For a Man! (1930) – Signor Ferrari, Italian Master of Ceremonies (uncredited)
- Kiss Me Again (1931) – Gino – Orchestra Leader in Cafe (uncredited)
- The Last Parade (1931) – Joe
- Always Goodbye (1931) – Italian Policeman (uncredited)
- That's My Line (1931, Short) – Henchman
- The Man from Death Valley (1931) – Ortego
- Possessed (1931) – Signor Martini – Party Guest (uncredited)
- Her Majesty, Love (1931) – Venetian Hotel Clerk (uncredited)
- Cock of the Air (1932) – Banquet Guest (uncredited)
- Hotel Continental (1932) – Waiter (uncredited)
- Scarface (1932) – Waiter at Columbia Cafe (uncredited)
- Careless Lady (1932) – French Hotel Waiter (uncredited)
- This Is the Night (1932) – Manager of Neopolitan Hotel (uncredited)
- Street of Women (1932) – Nightclub Patron (uncredited)
- Love Is a Racket (1932) – Sardi's Waiter (uncredited)
- Trouble in Paradise (1932) – Venetian (uncredited)
- A Farewell to Arms (1932) – Italian Soldier (uncredited)
- The King's Vacation (1933) – Headwaiter (uncredited)
- Hallelujah, I'm a Bum (1933) – Mayor's Chef (uncredited)
- Grand Slam (1933) – Barber (uncredited)
- Obey the Law (1933) – Giovanni
- The White Sister (1933) – Enrico – Guido's Chauffeur (uncredited)
- The Keyhole (1933) – Gino – Hotel Metropole Waiter #2 (uncredited)
- Picture Snatcher (1933) – Barber (uncredited)
- I Loved You Wednesday (1933) – Opera Singing Neighbor (uncredited)
- Laughing at Life (1933) – Don Flavio's Associate (uncredited)
- Voltaire (1933) – Musician in Versailles (uncredited)
- My Woman (1933) – George – Waiter (uncredited)
- Walls of Gold (1933) – 2nd Furrier (uncredited)
- Jimmy and Sally (1933) – 1st Waiter at Club Rendezvous (uncredited)
- Girl Without a Room (1933) – Man at Art Awards (uncredited)
- Flying Down to Rio (1933) – Messenger (uncredited)
- I Am a Thief (1934)
- I Sell Anything (1934)
- Flirting with Danger (1934)
- Paradise Canyon (1935)
- The Widow from Monte Carlo (1935)
- The Great Hotel Murder (1935)
- The Oregon Trail (1936)
- Mr. Deeds Goes to Town (1936)
- Dodsworth (1936)
- Rebellion (1936)
- Beau Geste (1939)
- Rose of the Rio Grande (1938)
- Gone with the Wind (1939) – Minor Role (uncredited)
- Mr. Moto Takes a Vacation (1939)
- Saved by the Belle (1939) – General Casino
- The Grapes of Wrath (1940) – Chef (uncredited)
- Rebecca (1940) – Hotel Manager (uncredited)
- The Mark of Zorro (1940) – Caballero (uncredited)
- An Ache in Every Stake (1941) – Chef
- Affectionately Yours (1941)
- Citizen Kane (1941) – Gino (uncredited)
- Casablanca (1942) – Waiter at Rick's (uncredited)
- Appointment in Berlin (1943)
- Chetniks! The Fighting Guerrillas (1943) – Italian Lieutenant
- House of Frankenstein (1944)
- Micro-Phonies (1945) – Italian Singer
- Secrets of Monte Carlo (1951)
- Living It Up (1954)
