= Men (1924 film) =

1924 film by Dimitri Buchowetzki

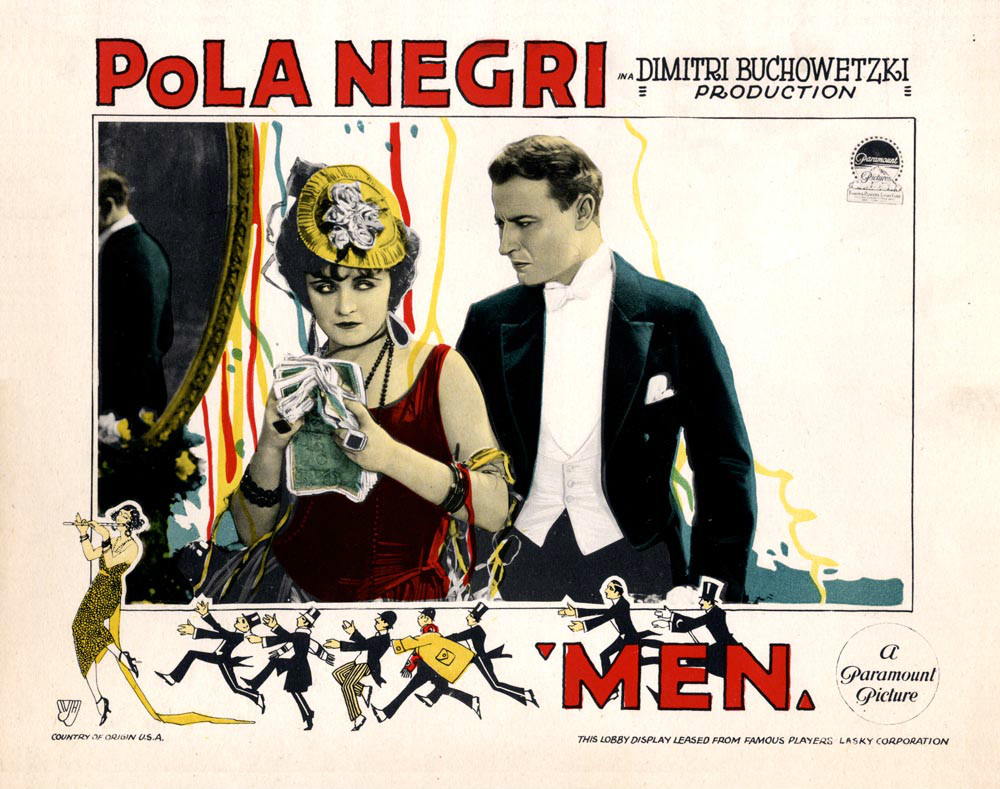
- Lobby card
- Directed by: Dimitri Buchowetzki
- Written by: Paul Bern (adaptation)
- Story by: Dimitri Buchowetzki
- Produced by: Adolph Zukor; Jesse L. Lasky
- Starring: Pola Negri
- Cinematography: Alvin Wyckoff
- Production company: Famous Players–Lasky
- Distributed by: Paramount Pictures
- Release date: May 4, 1924
- Running time: 7 reels, 6,634 feet
- Country: United States
- Language: Silent (English intertitles)

Men is a 1924 American silent drama film directed by Dimitri Buchowetzki and starring Pola Negri that was produced by Famous Players–Lasky and distributed by Paramount Pictures.

The film was Negri's fifth feature for Paramount since coming to the United States in 1923.

== Plot ==
As described in a film magazine review, Cleo, a waitress in a cheap Marseilles cafe, is lured to Paris by a procurer in the white slave business and there is betrayed by a nobleman. The following day, while grieving over her experience, she is accosted by Georges Kleber, whom she repulses. Years pass, and she becomes a famous dancer and fascinates the banker Henri Duval, but spurns his love. Georges again appears, and this time is favorably received by her, but laughed at when he discloses his passion for her. He steals money from Duval's bank, where he is employed, and gives it to Cleo. Threatened with arrest, Georges is saved when Cleo, who now loves him, offers herself to Duval in payment. However, Duval relents and allows the lovers to be together.

== Cast ==
- Pola Negri as Cleo
- Robert Frazer as Georges Kleber
- Robert Edeson as Henri Duval
- Josef Swickard as Cleo's Father
- Monte Collins as Francois
- Gino Corrado as The Stranger
- Edgar Norton as The Baron
- Alan George (uncredited)
- Carlton Griffin (uncredited)
- Billy Seay as Little Boy (uncredited)
- Dick Sutherland (uncredited)
- Hal Thompson (uncredited)

== Censorship ==
Films during that period were subject to censorship by state and city censor boards. The Board of Motion Picture Review of Worcester, Massachusetts, banned the showing of Men after it had been shown in two theaters.

== Preservation status ==
With no copies of Men located in any film archives, it is a lost film.

== See also ==
- List of lost films
