= Virginia Warwick =

Silent film actress

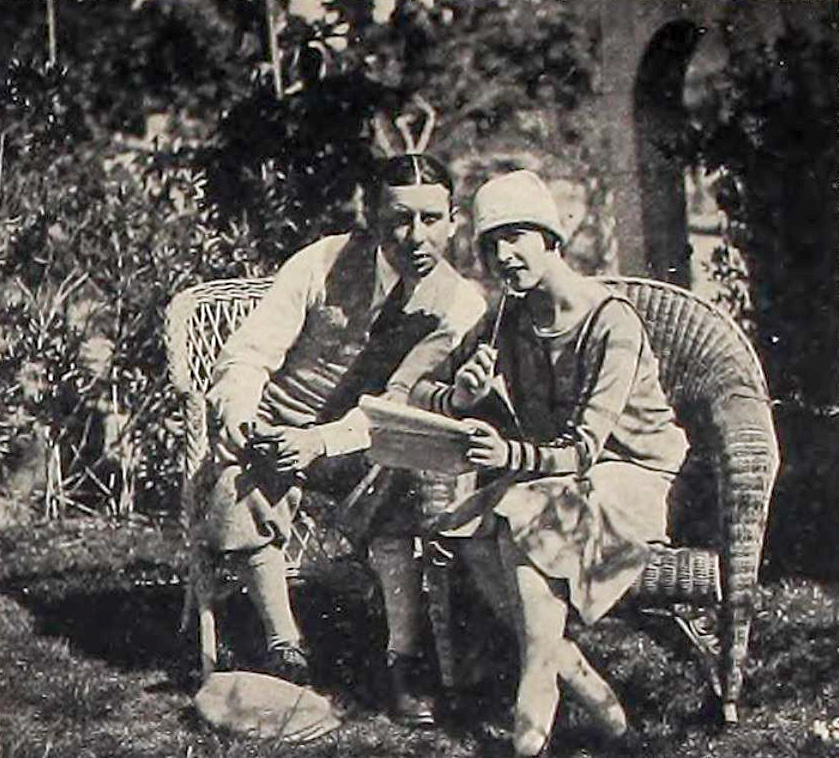
- Warwick with her husband Jimmie Adams in May 1926
- Born: August 26, 1902; Kirkwood, Missouri, U.S.
- Died: July 27, 1988 (aged 85); Palm Springs, California, U.S.
- Occupation: Actress
- Spouse: Jimmie Adams (m. 1924–1933) (his death)

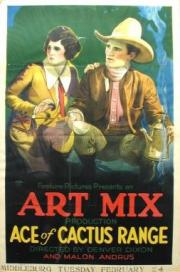
Poster from Ace of Cactus Range (1924)

Virginia Warwick (August 26, 1902 – July 27, 1988) was an American actress in silent films. She had several starring roles, including the western film Ace of Cactus Range (1924).

== Biography ==
Warwick received her early education in her hometown of St. Louis before continuing her schooling in Los Angeles.

As a high school athlete, she became one of Mack Sennett's bathing beauties. After being a Sennett Bathing Beauty, Warwick starred opposite Frank Merrill in Reckless Speed (1925) and A Gentleman Roughneck.

In October 1924, Warwick married actor and comedian Jimmie Adams. In 1923, Warwick filed a lawsuit to prevent Virginia Helen Warrick from using the name Virginia Warrick professionally.

Virginia Warwick Rhoads died on July 27, 1988, in Palm Springs, California.

== Partial filmography ==
- The Four Horsemen of the Apocalypse (1921) as Chichí
- Hands Off! (1921)
- Boomerang Justice (1922)
- Pioneer's Gold (1924)
- Reckless Speed (1924)
- South of the Equator (1924)
- The Vagabond Trail (1924) as Nellie Le Brun
- The Danger Rider (1924)
- Ace of Cactus Range (1924)
- Wild West (1925) as Elsie Withers
- A Gentleman Roughneck (1925)
- The Desperate Game (1926) as Belle Deane
- My Own Pal (1926) as Molly
- Moran of the Mounted (1926) with Reed Howes
