= The Vagabond Trail =

1924 film

- Directed by: William A. Wellman
- Written by: Doty Hobart (writer)
- Based on: Donnegan by George Owen Baxter
- Produced by: Willam Fox
- Starring: Buck Jones; Marian Nixon
- Cinematography: Joseph H. August
- Distributed by: Fox Film Corporation
- Release date: March 9, 1924
- Running time: 50 minutes
- Country: United States
- Language: Silent (English intertitles)

The Vagabond Trail is a lost 1924 American silent Western film directed by William A. Wellman and produced and distributed by the Fox Film Corporation.

The film is based on the 1923 novel Donnegan by George Owen Baxter (aka Max Brand).

== Plot ==
As described in a film magazine review, while playing with his younger brother Donnegan, Lord Nick is the cause of his injury and, when he learns that the youngster may die, he leaves home and becomes a vagabond. However, the boy does not die, and when he becomes older he sets out to find his older brother. He has several thrilling encounters, among which is one with a bully who shoots and wounds Donnegan rather severely. It develops after the shooting that the man who committed the crime is the brother for whom he had been searching. After a reconciliation, there is happiness among the parties.

== Cast ==
- Buck Jones as Donnegan (credited as Charles Jones)
- Marian Nixon as Lou Macon
- Charles Coleman as Aces
- Lee Shumway as Lord Nick (credited as L.C. Shumway)
- Virginia Warwick as Nellie Le Brun
- Harry Lonsdale as Colonel Macon
- Frank Nelson as Slippy
- George H. Reed as George Romain

== Preservation status ==
With no prints of The Vagabond Trail located in any film archives, it is a lost film.
