= Across the Atlantic =

1928 film

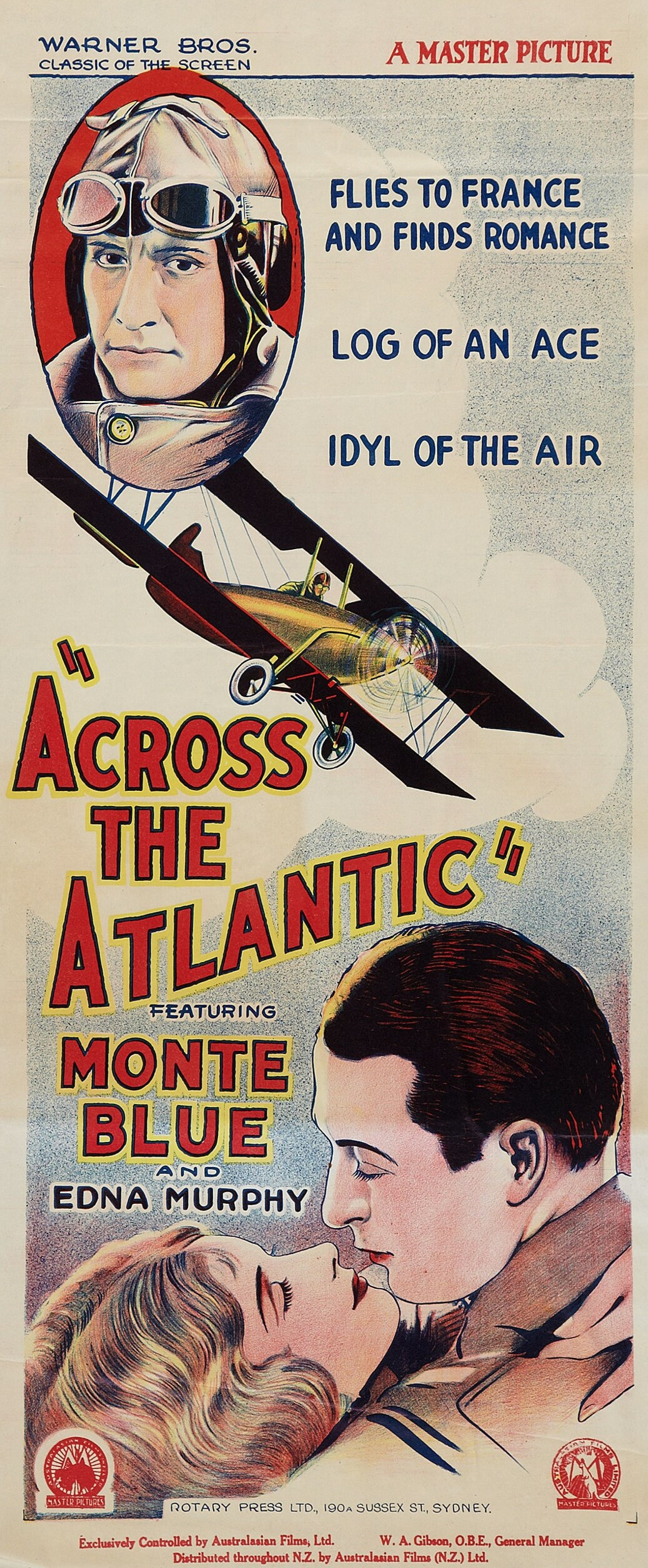
- Film poster
- Directed by: Howard Bretherton
- Written by: Harvey Gates
- Story by: John Ransom
- Starring: Monte Blue
- Cinematography: Barney McGill
- Music by: Philip Green
- Production company: Warner Bros.
- Distributed by: Warner Bros.
- Release date: February 25, 1928 (US)
- Running time: 60 minutes; 7 reels
- Country: United States
- Languages: Sound (Synchronized) (English Intertitles)

Across the Atlantic is a 1928 lost American synchronized sound romantic drama produced and distributed by Warner Bros. While the film has no audible dialog, it was released with a synchronized musical score with sound effects using the sound-on-disc Vitaphone process. Influenced by the "Lindy craze", generated by Charles Lindbergh's famous ocean crossing flight, Across the Atlantic was rushed into production.

== Plot ==
John Clayton, a self-made industrial magnate shaped by the era of American wartime prosperity, has built his fortune in manufacturing during World War I. He is the proud but stern father of two sons: Dan Clayton, a dutiful and business-minded man, and Hugh Clayton, a spirited aviator with a daredevil streak. Both brothers are in love with Phyllis Joynes, their father's intelligent and graceful secretary. Though both men hope to win her heart, Phyllis clearly favors Hugh.

Despite John's disapproval, Hugh pursues his passion for aviation and is among the first to enlist for overseas service due to his expertise with aircraft. Before shipping out, Hugh and Phyllis marry. John, although reluctant, accepts Hugh's choice. Dan, deeply disappointed but noble, accepts defeat with the words, "The best man wins," and devotes himself to helping their father manage the family business.

Time passes. Phyllis awaits letters from Hugh, but eventually, the correspondence stops. News comes that Hugh's plane has been shot down. He is listed among the missing. Phyllis clings to the hope that he is alive, but years go by without word.

Unbeknownst to his family, Hugh has survived—found with no memory of who he is. In a German hospital, he becomes known as a strange, hopeless case of amnesia, a man without a past.

Years roll on. The war ends, peace returns, and the world moves on. Eight years later, Phyllis has mourned, grieved, and resolved to let go. In gratitude for Dan's kindness and constant support, she agrees to marry him—after a final pilgrimage to the village of Debrie, the last place Hugh was seen.

Meanwhile, John Clayton, still honoring the memory of his lost son, has invested millions in aviation and built a massive experimental aircraft intended to make the first transatlantic flight. The plane is named The Spirit of Hugh Clayton—a monument to the son he believes lost.

Fate intervenes. Hugh, now released from a hospital but still unaware of his identity, finds work at his father's aviation plant. Though he never encounters John or Dan directly, his natural talent for aeronautics earns him a spot on the test crew of the transatlantic flight.

As the aircraft climbs into the clouds, the rush of flight triggers something deep within Hugh. Suddenly, the memories return—his life, his love, his family—all comes flooding back. But in that same moment, a mechanical failure sends the plane crashing to the ground.

Though injured, Hugh survives. When he awakens in the hospital and insists he is Hugh Clayton, he is declared delusional and transferred to an asylum. He is frantic when he learns that Phyllis and Dan are now in Europe, preparing to wed. The asylum officials attempt to contact John Clayton, but he cannot be found.

Desperate, Hugh escapes the asylum and returns to the Clayton airfield. In a bold move, he steals the second transatlantic aircraft and launches into the sky, determined to prove who he is and win back the life he lost.

Word spreads of the mysterious lone flyer: “Sighted 400 miles off Newfoundland... later off the Irish coast.” The world watches in suspense.

In Paris, John Clayton is finally located and informed of the astonishing claims of the unknown pilot. As the aircraft lands to great acclaim at the Paris airport, the haggard man steps from the cockpit—and into the arms of his astonished father.

Phyllis, overwhelmed with joy, reunites with her husband. Dan, noble to the end, gracefully steps aside. The family is whole again. Hugh and Phyllis, reunited after years of sorrow and separation, look forward to the future together.

== Cast ==
- Monte Blue as Hugh Clayton
- Edna Murphy as Phyllis Jones
- Burr McIntosh as John Clayton
- Robert Ober as Dan Clayton
- Irene Rich as unknown role

== Production ==
Aviation historian Michael Paris in From the Wright Brothers to Top Gun: Aviation, Nationalism, and Popular Cinema (1995) described the frenzy of trying to woo Lindbergh to do a film. Hollywood resorted to a spate of aviation-related features including Publicity Madness (1927), Flying Romeos (1928) and A Hero for a Night, even the Walt Disney Studios' Plane Crazy (1928), all comedy spoofs of the Lindbergh transatlantic flight. (Note: Lindbergh was right in refusing Hollywood entries as most of the proposals were "slapstick" comedies.)

Across the Atlantic was a silent film but Warner Bros. added the Vitaphone process with musical score and sound effects, but no dialogue.

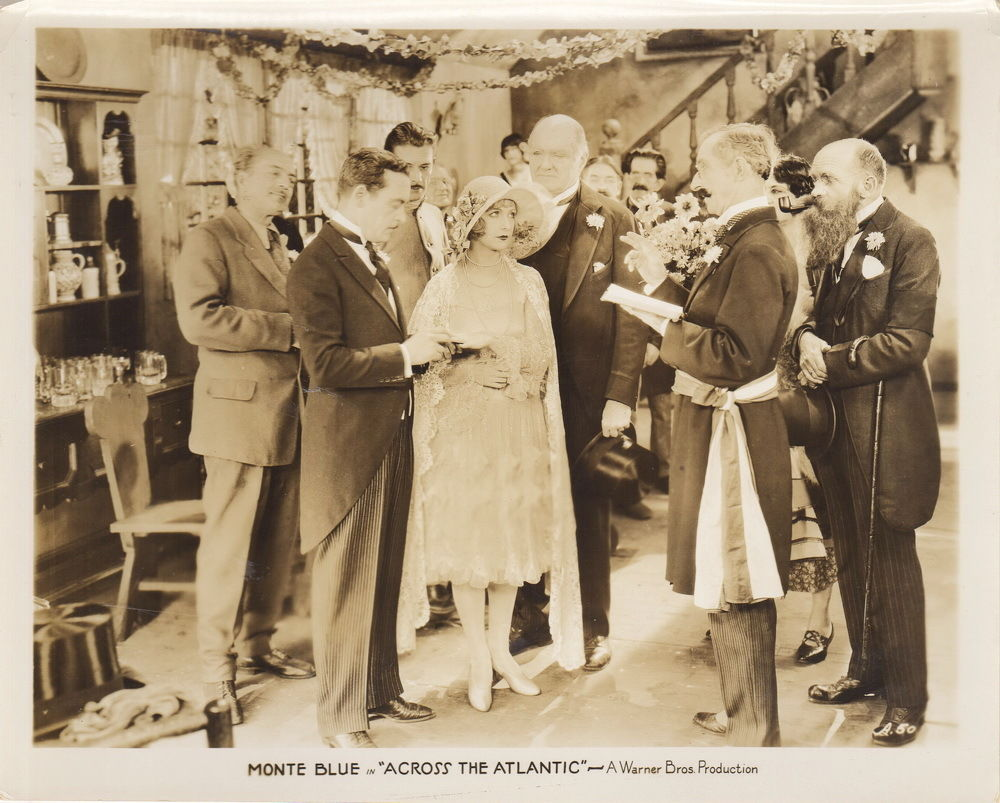
Image of the film

== Reception ==
H. Hugh Wynne in The Motion Picture Stunt Pilots and Hollywood's Classic Aviation Movies (1987) wrote "Lindbergh's flight influenced the story of 'Across the Atlantic'."

== See also ==
- List of early sound feature films (1926–1929)
