= Embarrassing Moments =

Embarrassing Moments may refer to:

- Embarrassing Moments (1930 film), an American comedy film
- Embarrassing Moments (1934 film), an American comedy film
