= So This Is Paris =

So This Is Paris may refer to:

- So This Is Paris (1926 film), an American silent comedy film
- So This Is Paris (1954 film), an American romantic musical comedy film
