= The Gate Crasher =

1928 film

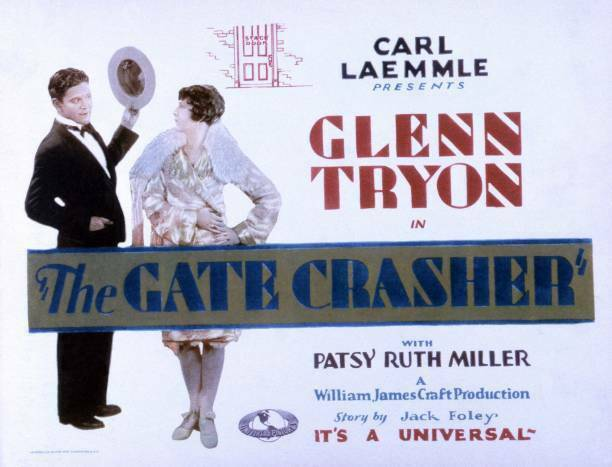
- Directed by: William James Craft
- Screenplay by: Carl Krusada; Vin Moore; William James Craft; Albert DeMond
- Story by: Jack Foley
- Produced by: Harry L. Decker
- Starring: Glenn Tryon; Patsy Ruth Miller; T. Roy Barnes; Carla Laemmle; Fred Malatesta; Claude Payton
- Cinematography: Alan Jones
- Edited by: Charles Craft
- Production company: Universal Pictures
- Distributed by: Universal Pictures
- Release date: December 9, 1928
- Running time: 60 minutes
- Country: United States
- Language: English

The Gate Crasher is a 1928 American comedy film directed by William James Craft and written by Carl Krusada, Vin Moore, William James Craft and Albert DeMond. The film stars Glenn Tryon, Patsy Ruth Miller, T. Roy Barnes, Carla Laemmle (credited as Beth Laemmle), Fred Malatesta and Claude Payton. The film was released on December 9, 1928, by Universal Pictures.

== Cast ==
- Glenn Tryon as Dick Henshaw
- Patsy Ruth Miller as Mara Di Leon
- T. Roy Barnes as Hal Reade
- Carla Laemmle as Maid
- Fred Malatesta as Julio
- Claude Payton as Zanfield
- Russ Powell as Caesar
- Tiny Sandford as Stage Doorman
- Albert J. Smith as Pedro
- Monte Montague as Crook
