= Christopher Wren (disambiguation) =

Christopher Wren (1632–1723), was an English architect.

Christopher Wren may also refer to:

- Christopher Wren (priest) (1589–1658), Anglican cleric, father of the architect
- Christopher Wren the Younger (1675–1747), English Member of Parliament, son of the architect
- Christopher Wren, character in Agatha Christie's play The Mousetrap
- Christopher S. Wren (1936–2026), American journalist and author
