= Rose of the World (1925 film) =

1925 film directed by Harry Beaumont

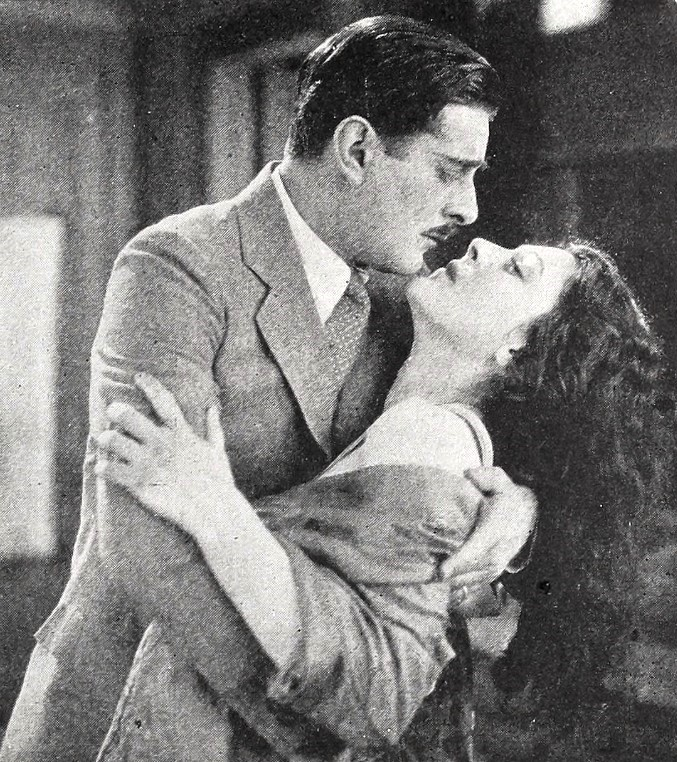
- Film still with Forrest and Miller
- Directed by: Harry Beaumont
- Screenplay by: Julien Josephson; Dorothy Farnum
- Based on: Rose of the World by Kathleen Norris
- Produced by: Harry Cohn
- Starring: Patsy Ruth Miller; Allan Forrest; Pauline Garon
- Cinematography: David Abel
- Production company: Warner Bros. Pictures
- Distributed by: Warner Bros. Pictures
- Release date: November 21, 1925 (US)
- Running time: 8 reels
- Country: United States
- Language: Silent (English intertitles)

Rose of the World is a lost 1925 American silent melodrama film directed by Harry Beaumont, which stars Patsy Ruth Miller, Allan Forrest, and Pauline Garon. The screenplay was written by Julien Josephson and Dorothy Farnum. Based on the 1924 novel of the same name by Kathleen Norris, the film was released by Warner Bros. Pictures on November 21, 1925.

The film has no relation to the 1918 film of the same name released by Artcraft Pictures, which is based upon a different novel.

== Plot ==
As described in a film magazine review, a young man who breaks his engagement to one woman to marry another learns after marriage that he is sadly mismated. The woman to whom he was first engaged also marries and is unhappy. The frivolous wife of the hero dies, however, and his longing turns toward the woman he once rejected. Her husband is killed, and she and the man who once spurned her plan a happy future together.

== Cast list ==
- Patsy Ruth Miller as Rose Kirby
- Allan Forrest as Jack Talbot
- Pauline Garon as Edith Rogers
- Rockliffe Fellowes as Clyde Bainbridge
- Barbara Luddy as Cecilia Kirby
- Alec Francis as Gramp Tallifer
- Helen Dunbar as Mrs. John Talbot
- Lydia Knott as Mrs. Kirby
- Edward Peil Jr. as The boy
- Carrie Clark Ward as Sally Towsey
- Carmencita Johnson as Baby (uncredited)
- Virginia Marshall as Little Girl (uncredited)
- Cammilla Johnson as Audrey (uncredited)

== Preservation ==
With no prints of Rose of the World located in any film archives, it is a lost film.
