= Skinner Steps Out =

1929 film

- Directed by: William James Craft
- Screenplay by: Albert DeMond; Matt Taylor
- Based on: Skinner's Dress Suit by Henry Irving Dodge
- Starring: Glenn Tryon; Merna Kennedy; E. J. Ratcliffe; Burr McIntosh; Lloyd Whitlock; William Welsh
- Cinematography: Alan Jones
- Edited by: Harry W. Lieb
- Music by: David Broekman
- Production company: Universal Pictures
- Distributed by: Universal Pictures
- Release date: November 24, 1929
- Running time: 70 minutes
- Country: United States
- Language: English

Skinner Steps Out is a 1929 American comedy film directed by William James Craft and written by Albert DeMond and Matt Taylor. It stars Glenn Tryon, Merna Kennedy, E. J. Ratcliffe, Burr McIntosh, Lloyd Whitlock and William Welsh. The film is based on Skinner's Dress Suit by Henry Irving Dodge which originally featured in serialised form in the Saturday Evening Post before it was subsequently published as a novel in 1916.

It was released on November 24, 1929, by Universal Pictures.

This film was the third filmed adaption of Dodge's novel, earlier versions included a 1917 short starring Harry Beaumont by Essanay Studios; and Skinner's Dress Suit (1926), which starred Reginald Denny and Laura La Plante.

== Cast ==
- Glenn Tryon as William Henry Skinner
- Merna Kennedy as 'Honey' Skinner
- E. J. Ratcliffe as Jackson
- Burr McIntosh as J.B. McLaughlin
- Lloyd Whitlock as Parking
- William Welsh as Crosby
- Kathleen Kerrigan as Mrs. Crosby
- Frederick Lee as Gates
- Jack Lipson as Neighbor
- Edna Marion as Neighbor's Wife

== See also ==
- List of early sound feature films (1926–1929)
