= Barnum Was Right =

1929 American comedy film

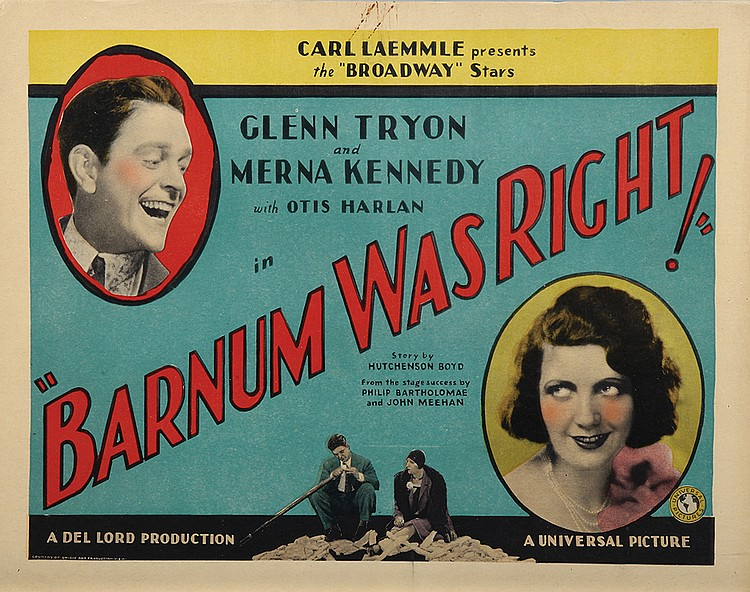
- Directed by: Del Lord
- Written by: Philip Bartholomae (play); John Meehan (play); Hutcheson Boyd; Arthur Ripley; Ewart Adamson
- Produced by: Carl Laemmle Jr.
- Starring: Glenn Tryon; Merna Kennedy; Basil Radford
- Cinematography: Jerome Ash
- Production company: Universal Pictures
- Distributed by: Universal Pictures
- Release date: September 22, 1929
- Running time: 57 minutes
- Country: United States
- Language: English

Barnum Was Right is a 1929 American comedy film directed by Del Lord and starring Glenn Tryon, Merna Kennedy and Basil Radford. Along with the sound version, the film was also released in a silent version for theatres not wired for sound. At present only the silent version exists, whilst the sound version is presumed lost.

== Cast ==
- Glenn Tryon as Freddie Farrell
- Merna Kennedy as Miriam Locke
- Otis Harlan as Samuel Locke
- Basil Radford as Standish
- Clarence Burton as Martin
- Lew Kelly as Harrison
- Isabelle Keith as Phoebe O'Dare
- Gertrude Sutton as Sarah
- Louise Beavers as Maid

== See also ==
- List of early sound feature films (1926–1929)

== Bibliography ==
- Munden, Kenneth White. The American Film Institute Catalog of Motion Pictures Produced in the United States, Part 1. University of California Press, 1997.
