= Rolling Home (1926 film) =

1926 film by William A. Seiter

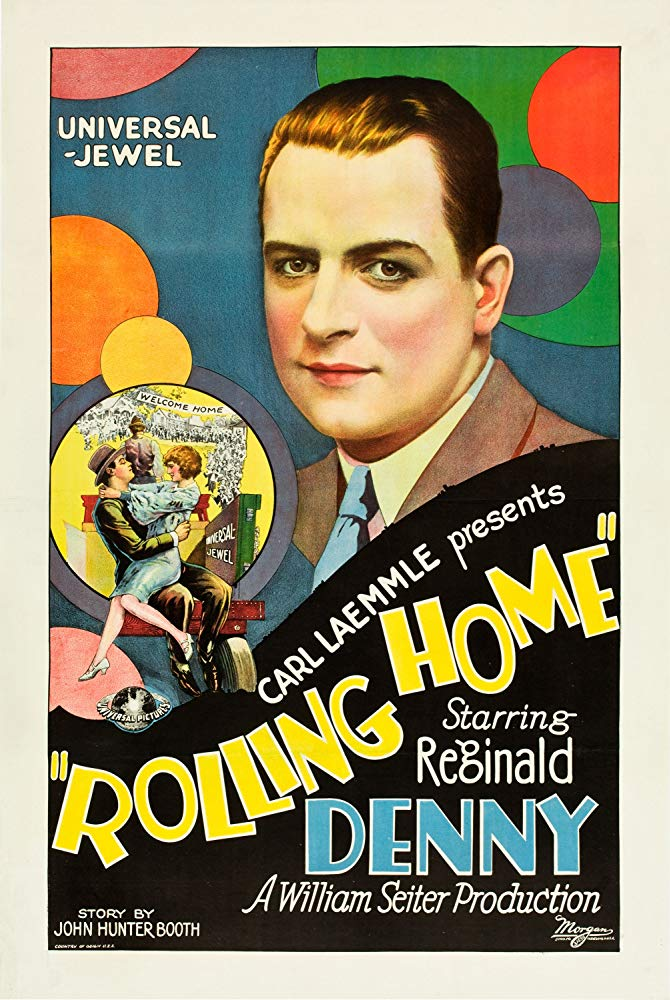
- Poster
- Directed by: William A. Seiter
- Written by: Rex Taylor; John McDermott
- Based on: Like a King by John Hunter Booth
- Produced by: Carl Laemmle
- Starring: Reginald Denny
- Cinematography: Arthur L. Todd
- Distributed by: Universal Pictures
- Release date: June 27, 1926
- Running time: 7 reels
- Country: United States
- Language: Silent (English intertitles)

Rolling Home is a 1926 American silent comedy film directed by William A. Seiter and starring Reginald Denny. It was produced and distributed by Universal Pictures.

== Cast ==
- Reginald Denny as Nat Alden
- Marian Nixon as Phyllis
- E. J. Ratcliffe as Mr. Grubbell
- Ben Hendricks Jr. as Dan Mason
- Margaret Seddon as Mrs. Alden
- George Nichols as Colonel Lowe
- Alfred Allen as General Wade
- Charles Thurston as Sheriff (credited as C.E. Thurston)
- George F. Marion as Selectman
- Alfred Knott as Selectman
- Anton Vaverka as Pemberton
- Howard Enstedt as Office Boy
- Adele Watson as Aunt

== Preservation ==
This film was recently rediscovered in a version missing ten minutes.
