= Broken Hearts of Hollywood =

1926 film

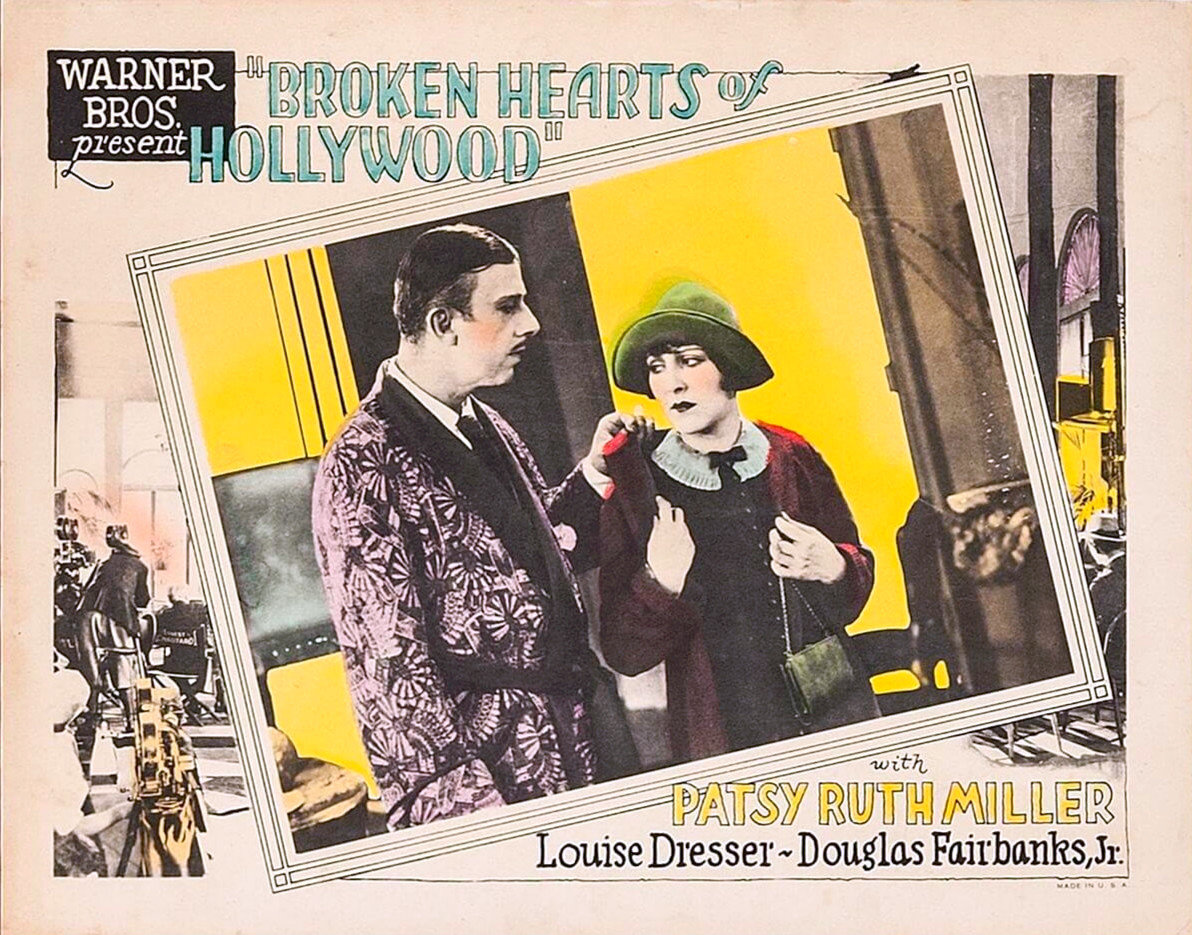
- Lobby card
- Directed by: Lloyd Bacon
- Screenplay by: Raymond L. Schrock; Edward Clark; Graham Baker (scenario)
- Starring: Patsy Ruth Miller; Louise Dresser; Douglas Fairbanks Jr.
- Cinematography: Virgil Miller
- Edited by: Clarence Kolster
- Production company: Warner Bros.
- Distributed by: Warner Bros.
- Release date: September 14, 1926
- Running time: 80 minutes (8 reels)
- Country: United States
- Language: Silent (English Intertitles)

Broken Hearts of Hollywood is a 1926 American silent comedy drama film released by Warner Bros. and directed by Lloyd Bacon. It is unknown, but the film might have been released with a Vitaphone soundtrack. A print of the film exists.

== Plot ==
Virginia Perry leaves her husband and child to return to Hollywood; but having dissipated her beauty and seeking solace in drink, she soon finds herself another "has been" on the fringe of movie circles. Her daughter, Betty Anne, wins a national beauty contest, and en route to Hollywood she meets Hal, another contest winner. Both fail in their first screen attempts and turn to Marshall, an unscrupulous trickster, who enrols them in his acting school. Molly, a movie extra, induces Betty Anne to attend a wild party, where she is arrested in a raid, and Hal, to raise the money for her bail, takes a "stunt" job in which he is badly hurt. Betty Anne seeks the aid of star actor McLain, who obtains for her the leading female role in his next film. Virginia, who is cast as her mother, keeps silent about their relationship until the film is completed. Apprehensive for her daughter's safety, she shoots Marshall while in a drunken stupor and is arrested. At the trial, Betty Anne's testimony saves her mother, who is then happily united with her daughter and Hal.

== Cast ==
- Patsy Ruth Miller as Betty Anne Bolton
- Louise Dresser as Virginia Perry
- Douglas Fairbanks Jr. as Hal Terwilliger
- Jerry Miley as Marshall
- Stuart Holmes as McLain
- Barbara Worth as Molly
- Dick Sutherland as the Sheriff
- Emile Chautard as the Director
- Anders Randolf as the District Attorney
- George Nichols as the Chief of Detectives
- Sam de Grasse as the Defense Attorney
- Dolores Corrigan as Betty Anne Bolton as a Child (uncredited)

== See also ==
- List of early Warner Bros. sound and talking features

== Preservation ==
A print of Broken Hearts of Hollywood is preserved in the George Eastman House and Filmmuseum Amsterdam.
