= Glenn Tryon =

American actor

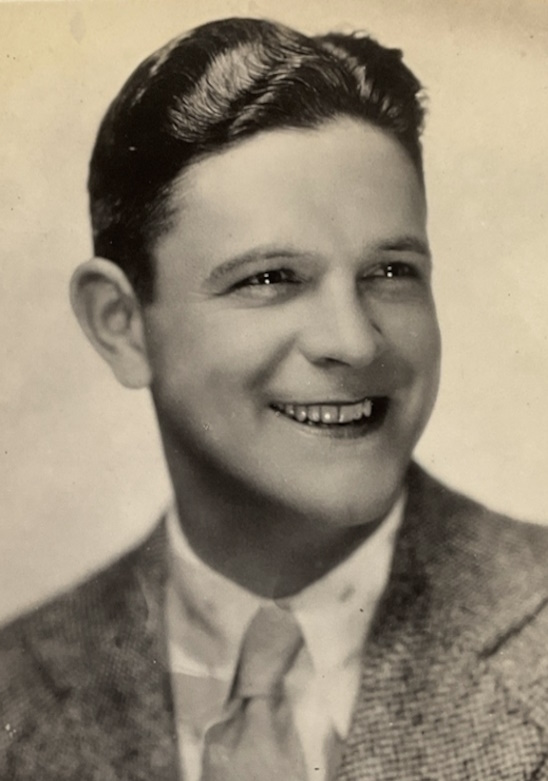
- Tryon around 1928
- Born: Glenn Monroe Kunkel; August 2, 1898; Juliaetta, Idaho, U.S.
- Died: April 18, 1970 (aged 71); Orlando, Florida, U.S.
- Occupations: Actor, screenwriter, film director
- Years active: 1923–1951
- Spouses: Jane Frazee (m. 1942; div. 1947): Lillian Hall
- Children: 1

Glenn Tryon (born Glenn Monroe Kunkel; August 2, 1898 – April 18, 1970) was an American film actor, screenwriter, director and producer. He appeared in more than 60 films between 1923 and 1951.

== Biography ==
He was born as Glenn Monroe Kunkel on August 2, 1898, in Juliaetta, Idaho. Tryon was married to actress Jane Frazee from 1942 to 1947 and they had one son, Timothy Tryon. Glenn was also married to actress Lillian Hall (1896–1959). Tryon died on April 18, 1970, in Orlando, Florida at the age of 71.

== Selected filmography ==
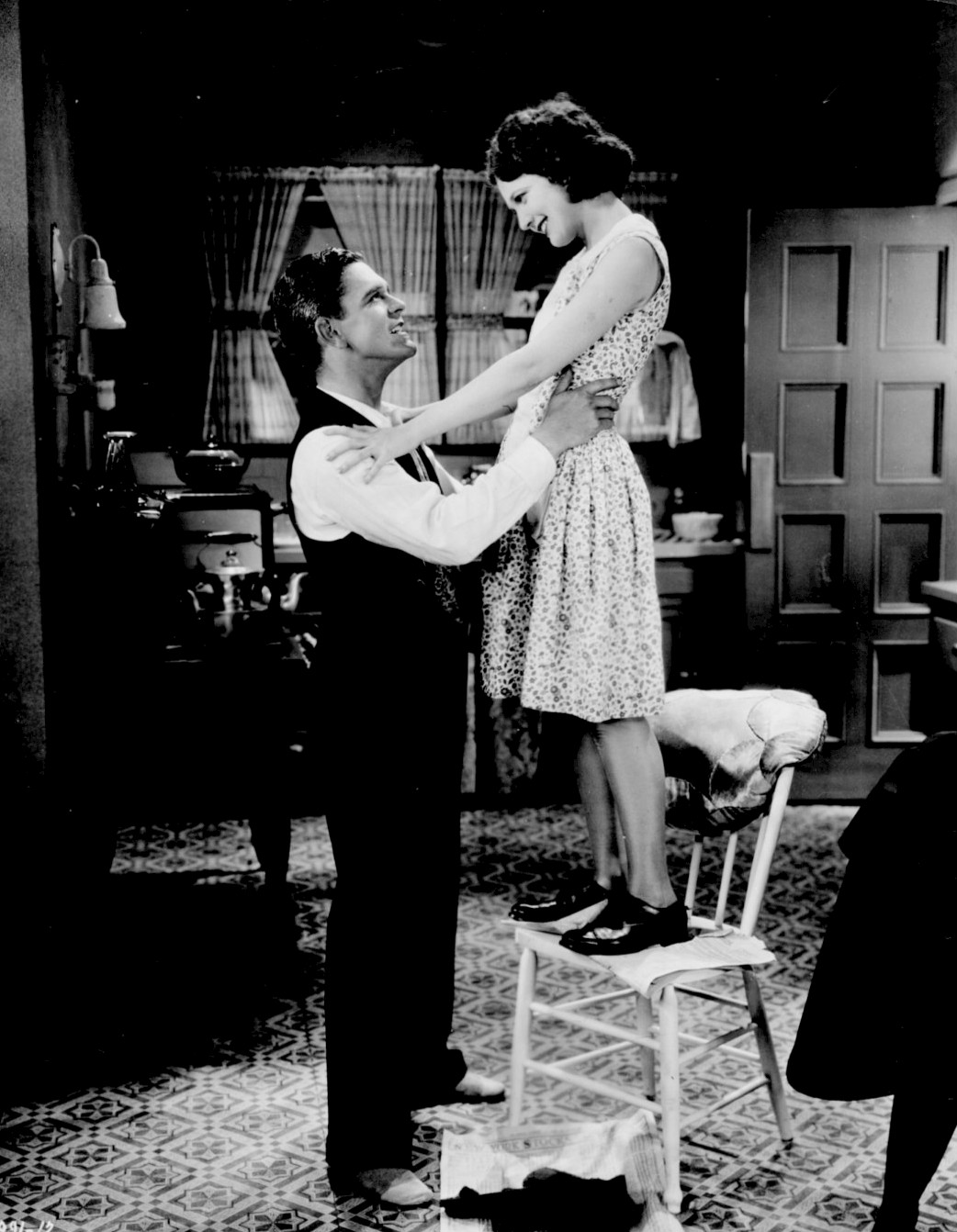
Tryon and Merna Kennedy in the film Skinner Steps Out (1929)

- Her Dangerous Path (1923)
- Mother's Joy (1923)
- Battling Orioles (1924)
- Smithy (1924)
- Near Dublin (1924)
- The White Sheep (1924)
- Say It with Babies (1926)
- The Cow's Kimona (1926)
- Along Came Auntie (1926)
- 45 Minutes from Hollywood (1926)
- Long Pants (1926)
- Two-Time Mama (1927)
- The Poor Nut (1927)
- A Hero for a Night (1927)
- Hot Heels (1928)
- How to Handle Women (1928)
- The Gate Crasher (1928)
- Lonesome (1928)
- Thanks for the Buggy Ride (1928)
- Barnum Was Right (1929)
- It Can Be Done (1929)
- Skinner Steps Out (1929)
- Broadway (1929)
- Dames Ahoy! (1930)
- The Midnight Special (1930)
- Dragnet Patrol (1931)
- Secret Menace (1931)
- The Widow in Scarlet (1932)
- The Pride of the Legion (1932)
- Beauty for the Asking (1939)
- Law Men (1944)
- George White's Scandals (1945)
- Messenger of Peace (1947)
- Miss Mink of 1949 (1949)
