= Say It with Babies =

1926 film

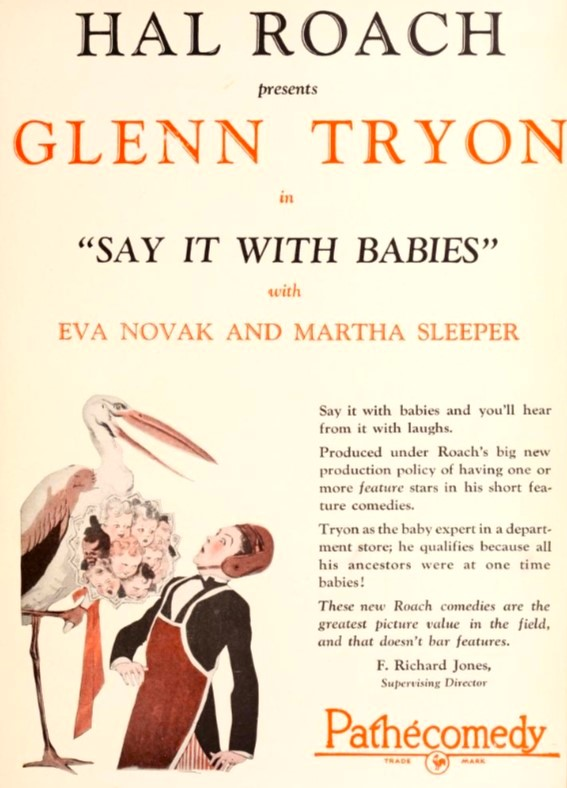
- Advertisement
- Directed by: Fred Guiol
- Written by: Carl Harbaugh; Grover Jones; James Parrott; Hal Yates
- Produced by: Hal Roach
- Starring: Glenn Tryon; Oliver Hardy
- Cinematography: Len Powers
- Distributed by: Pathé Exchange
- Release date: May 16, 1926
- Running time: 18 minutes
- Country: United States
- Language: Silent (English intertitles)

Say It with Babies (1926)

Say It with Babies is a 1926 American silent short comedy film directed by Fred Guiol, starring Glenn Tryon, and featuring Oliver Hardy.

== Plot ==
According to the copyright description, "Glenn is the baby expert in a department store. A mother leaves her baby for him to adopt, but he leaves it with the newlyweds next door. Sunday they go for a picnic. Glenn gets stung by a swarm of bees and gets a summons for speeding. They think baby has swallowed the key to the car. Glenn is forced to push them to the nearest trolley. They finally find the key and the car sinks almost out of sight in a mud puddle with Glenn and his wife still carrying on their fight on the roof of the car."

== Cast ==
- Glenn Tryon as Casper Crum
- Vivien Oakland as Mrs. Crum
- Oliver Hardy as Hector, the floorwalker (credited as Babe Hardy)
- Martha Sleeper as His wife
- Jackie Hanes as The waif (credited as Jackie 'Husky' Hanes)
- Eva Novak as Undetermined role
- Sammy Brooks as Undetermined role
- Helen Gilmore as Undetermined role
- Fred Kelsey as Policeman
- Nona Arlynn as Child
- Clara Guiol as Laughing Woman (uncredited)
- Billy O'Brien as Child (uncredited)
- Gus Schaffrath [= Gustav Schaffrath] as Undetermined role

== See also ==
- List of American films of 1926
- Oliver Hardy filmography
