= Carla Laemmle =

American actress (1909–2014)

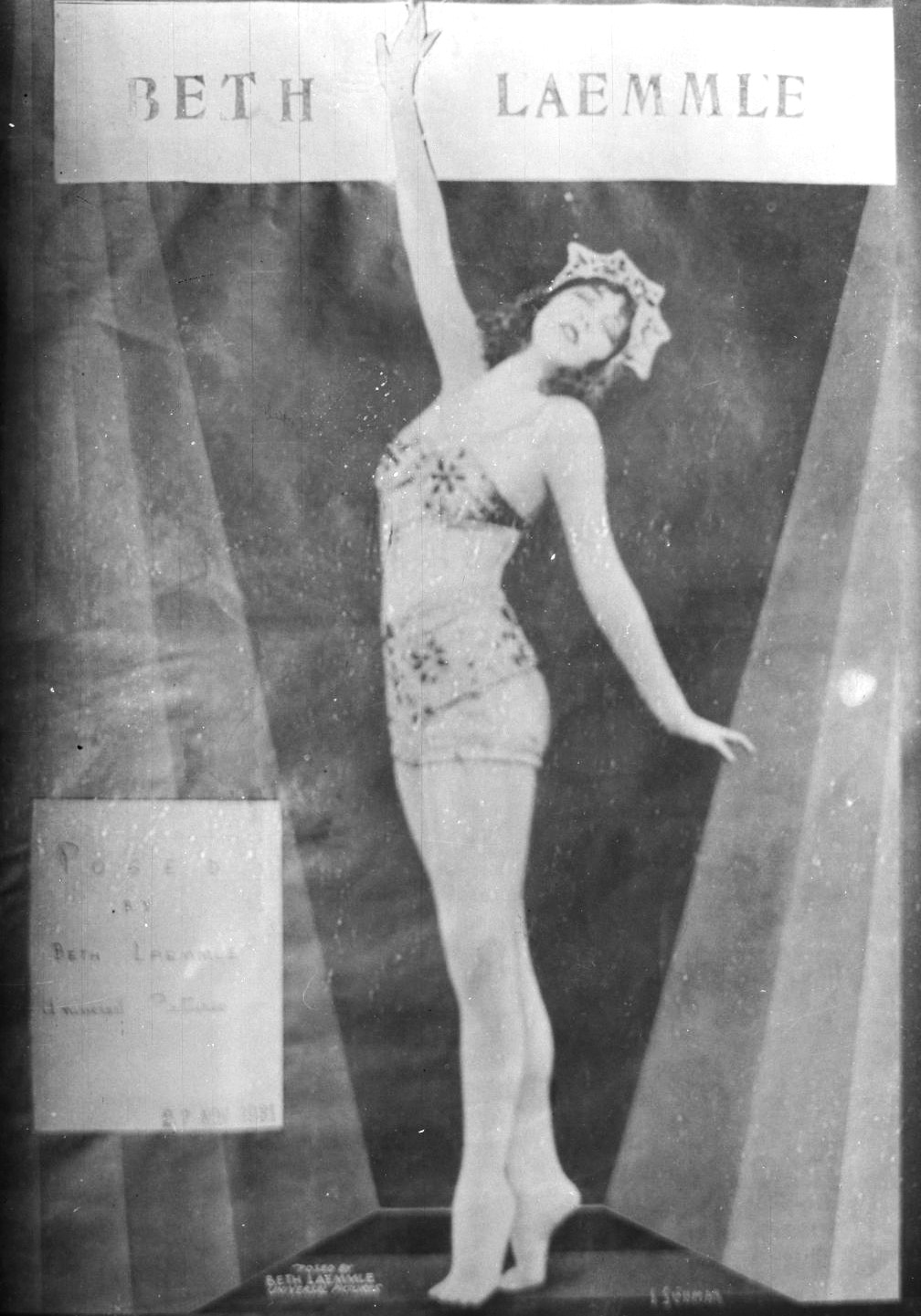
- Laemmle (as Beth Laemmle) on a magazine cover in 1932
- Born: Rebekah Isabelle Laemmle; October 20, 1909; Chicago, Illinois, U.S.
- Died: June 12, 2014 (aged 104); Los Angeles, California, U.S.
- Occupation: Actress
- Years active: 1925–1939; 2001; 2010–2014

Rebekah Isabelle Laemmle (October 20, 1909 – June 12, 2014), known professionally as Carla Laemmle and occasionally as Beth Laemmle, was an American actress and dancer, and the niece of Universal Pictures studio founder Carl Laemmle. As an actress/dancer, she is known primarily for her roles in The Phantom of the Opera (1925) and Dracula (1931). At the time of her death, she was one of the last surviving actors of the silent film era, with her career spanning nearly nine decades, also with one of the longest gaps.

== Career ==
Laemmle entered films in 1925, as "Carla Laemmle", in an uncredited role as a ballet dancer in the original silent film version of The Phantom of the Opera (1925) and later had a small role in the early talkie version of Dracula (1931). In that film, she portrayed (again uncredited) a bespectacled passenger riding in a bumpy horse-drawn carriage with Renfield as he is travelling to Dracula's castle. Laemmle continued to appear in small roles until the late 1930s, when she disappeared from the movie screen. She briefly came out of retirement to play a vampire in The Vampire Hunters Club (2001).

In 2009, the book Growing Up with Monsters: My Times at Universal Studios in Rhymes, co-authored by Laemmle and Daniel Kinske, was released. The book was illustrated by the legendary Jack Davis (of Mad magazine fame) and details her life at Universal Studios from 1921 to 1937. On October 20, 2009, she celebrated her 100th birthday with a guestlist which included Ray Bradbury, George Clayton Johnson, Bela Lugosi Jr., Sara Karloff, and Ron Chaney.

On October 3, 2010, she appeared in BBC Four documentary A History of Horror with Mark Gatiss, sharing memories of her early film work with Lon Chaney and Bela Lugosi. She also recited her opening lines from Dracula.

In November 2010, she made an appearance in the documentary Moguls and Movie Stars: A History of Hollywood for Turner Classic Movies and in May 2011 she appeared in Paul Merton's Birth of Hollywood on the BBC. In March 2012, Turner Classic Movies presented a screening of Dracula, where Laemmle appeared at the screening in connection with its Classic Movie Festival.

== Death ==
Laemmle died at her home in Los Angeles at the age of 104 on June 12, 2014. She never married nor had children, but was the companion of actor-writer Raymond Cannon until his death in 1977. She was buried at Home of Peace Cemetery (East Los Angeles).

== Filmography ==
| Year | Title | Role | Notes |
|---|---|---|---|
| 1925 | The Phantom of the Opera | Prima Ballerina | Uncredited |
| 1927 | Topsy and Eva | Angel | Uncredited |
| 1927 | Uncle Tom's Cabin | Auction Spectator | Uncredited |
| 1928 | The Gate Crasher | Maid | Credited as Beth Laemmle |
| 1929 | The Broadway Melody | Specialty Dancer | Uncredited |
| 1929 | The Hollywood Revue | Pearl Dancer | Uncredited |
| 1930 | King of Jazz | Chorine | Credited as Beth Laemmle |
| 1931 | Dracula | Coach Passenger | Uncredited |
| 1935 | The Mystery of Edwin Drood | Schoolgirl | Uncredited |
| 1935 | His Last Fling | Role unconfirmed | Short film, credited as Beth Laemmle |
| 1936 | The Adventures of Frank Merriwell | Carla Rogers | |
| 1936 | The King Steps Out | Ballerina | Uncredited |
| 1939 | On Your Toes | Ballet Dancer | Uncredited |
| 2001 | The Vampire Hunters Club | Elder Vampire | Direct-to-video release |
| 2010 | Pooltime | Zelda | |
| 2011 | Among the Rugged Peaks | No | Producer only |
| 2013 | A Sad State of Affairs | Connie | |
| 2015 | Mansion of Blood | Maribelle | Scenes filmed in 2014, posthumous release |
| 2017 | The Extra | Minnie | Scenes filmed in 2014 (final film role), posthumous release |
