= Virginia Sale =

American actress (1899–1992)

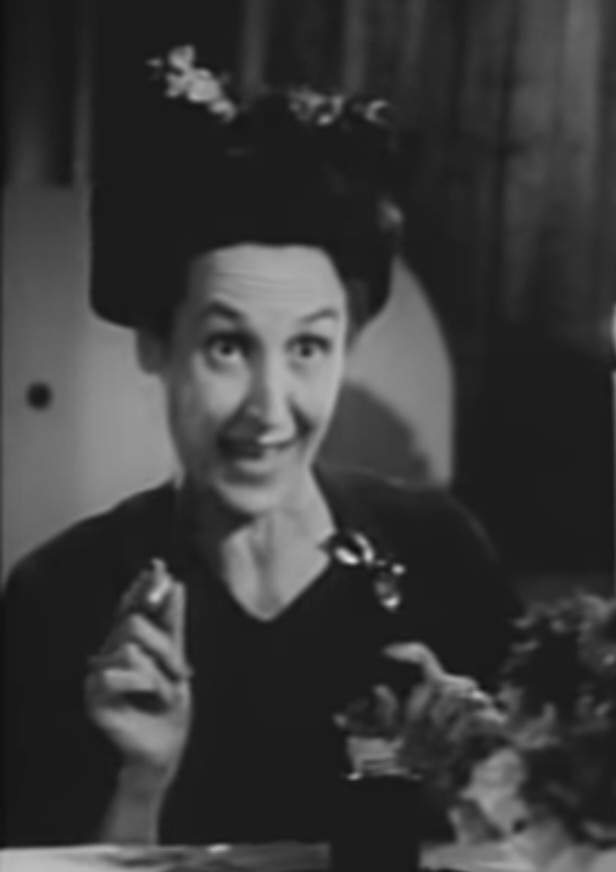
- Sale in Dark Mountain (1944)
- Born: May 20, 1899; Urbana, Illinois, U.S.
- Died: August 23, 1992 (aged 93); Woodland Hills, California, U.S.
- Resting place: Arlington National Cemetery
- Occupation: Actress
- Years active: 1927–1973
- Spouse: Sam Wren (m. 1935; died 1962)
- Children: 2

Virginia Sale (May 20, 1899 – August 23, 1992) was an American character actress whose career spanned six decades, during most of which she played older women, even when she was in her twenties. Over the 46 years she was active as an actress, she worked in films, stage, radio and television. She was famous for her one-woman stage show, Americana Sketches, which she did for more than 1,000 performances during a 15-year span.

Married to actor and studio executive Sam Wren, she co-starred with him in one of the first television family comedies, Wren's Nest, in the late 1940s and early 1950s. She gave birth to fraternal twins, Virginia and Christopher, in 1936. Later in her career she worked on television, and in commercials. She died from heart failure at the age of 93 at the Motion Picture and Television Hospital in 1992.

== Early life ==
Born on May 20, 1899, in Urbana, Illinois to Frank Orville and Lillie Belle (Partlow) Sale, she attended the University of Illinois for two years, before transferring to the American Academy of Dramatic Arts, from which she graduated. Her brother, vaudeville comedian Charles "Chic" Sale, convinced her to leave New York and pursue a career in Hollywood films.

== Career ==
Upon her arrival in Hollywood, Sale quickly discovered it was easier for her to get character roles as older women. Even though she was still in her twenties, Sale was cast as old women in many films. Her career began at the end of the silent film era, with her first film being Legionnaires In Paris (1927). Her early career included roles in Moby Dick (1930), Oliver Twist (1933), and Madame Du Barry (1934). During this period she met actor and studio executive Sam Wren, and the two were married in 1935. The following year she gave birth to fraternal twins, Virginia and Christopher.

She developed her own one-woman show, Americana Sketches, based on her life and experiences growing up in Urbana, Illinois. During the 1930s, 1940s and 1950s, she performed this piece more than 6,000 times, including touring Europe during World War II, performing for the troops. She was also a frequent performer on radio, and was a regular on For Those We Love, a radio serial in the late 1930s and 1940s. During this period, she continued to appear in films, including: Topper (1937), starring Cary Grant and Constance Bennett; When Tomorrow Comes (1939), with Irene Dunne and Charles Boyer; Raoul Walsh's They Died with Their Boots On (1942), starring Errol Flynn and Olivia de Havilland; Badman's Territory (1945) and Trail Street (1947), both with Randolph Scott; and Night and Day (1946), directed by Michael Curtiz and starring Cary Grant.

In 1947, she had a recurring role in back-to-back films centered on a detective character, Russ Ashton (played by Tom Neal): The Hat-box Mystery and The Case of the Baby Sitter. While a series based on the character might have been planned, these were the only two films produced about the character by Screen Art Pictures.

As the television industry began, Sale's husband, Sam Wren, developed a sitcom for the new medium. Entitled Wren's Nest, it centered around the family life of the Wrens, starring the couple and their twin twelve-year-old children, and ran three times a week during 1949.

Sale took a hiatus from the film industry in the 1950s, focusing on television, mainly in commercials. In the 1960s, she began to appear on episodic television, including a featured role as the first Selma Plout on Petticoat Junction from 1964 to 1965 (with guest appearances in 1966 and 1969 as Maude Blake and Myra King) She also returned to the big screen, appearing in How to Succeed in Business Without Really Trying (1967), and One Man's Way (1964). Her final film appearance was in a small role in 1973's Slither, starring James Caan, Peter Boyle, and Sally Kellerman.

== Later years and death ==
She remained married to her husband, Sam, until his death in 1962. In her final years, she lived at the Motion Picture and Television Country Hospital in Woodland Hills, California, where she died on August 23, 1992, from heart failure. She was interred next to her husband in Arlington National Cemetery, in Arlington, Virginia, where he had earned a burial plot for his service in World War I.

== Filmography ==
(Per AFI database)

- Legionnaires in Paris (1927) as Fifi
- The Floating College (1928) as Miss Cobbs
- Harold Teen (1928) as Mrs. Schmittenberger
- Midnight Madness (1928) as The Gargoyle - Childers' Secretary
- The Cohens and Kellys in Atlantic City (1929)
- Below the Deadline (1929)
- Fancy Baggage (1929)
- The Kid's Clever (1929)
- Back Pay (1930)
- Bright Lights (1930)
- The Dude Wrangler (1930)
- Embarrassing Moments (1930)
- Loose Ankles (1930)
- Lovin' the Ladies (1930)
- Moby Dick (1930)
- Showgirl in Hollywood (1930)
- Big Business Girl (1931)
- Her Majesty, Love (1931)
- Gold Dust Gertie (1931)
- My Past (1931)
- Secret Service (1931)
- Compromised (1931)
- Too Young to Marry (1931)
- Many a Slip (1931)
- Union Depot (1932)
- Those We Love (1932)
- Man Wanted (1932)
- Fireman Save My Child (1932)
- Rackety Rax (1932)
- The Iron Master (1933)
- Bachelor Mother (1933)
- Easy Millions (1933)
- Sitting Pretty (1933)
- Smoke Lightning (1933)
- Oliver Twist (1933)
- Love Past Thirty (1934)
- Marrying Widows (1934)
- Smarty (1934)
- Madame Du Barry (1934)
- The Man with Two Faces (1934)
- Registered Nurse (1934)
- I Like It That Way (1934)
- Embarrassing Moments (1934)
- We're in the Money (1935)
- It's a Small World (1935)
- After the Dance (1935)
- Three Men on a Horse (1936)
- Think Fast, Mr. Moto (1937)
- Dangerous Holiday (1937)
- Topper (1937)
- Angel's Holiday (1937)
- Outcast (1937)
- A Family Affair (1937)
- Meet the Missus (1937)
- Live, Love and Learn (1937)
- We Have Our Moments (1937)
- Trouble at Midnight (1937)
- A Trip to Paris (1938)
- His Exciting Night (1938)
- The Jury's Secret (1938)
- Time Out for Murder (1938)
- Charlie Chan in Reno (1939)
- The Amazing Mr. Williams (1939)
- The Lady's from Kentucky (1939)
- When Tomorrow Comes (1939)
- Little Accident (1939)
- The Doctor Takes a Wife (1940)
- Flowing Gold (1940)
- Gold Rush Maisie (1940)
- Strike Up the Band (1940)
- Calling All Husbands (1940)
- Forty Little Mothers (1940)
- Back Street (1941)
- The Flame of New Orleans (1941)
- Her First Beau (1941)
- Miss Polly (1941)
- Skylark (1941)
- One Foot in Heaven (1941)
- Harvard, Here I Come (1941)
- They Died with Their Boots On (1942)
- The Big Shot (1942) as Mrs. Miggs
- Boston Blackie Goes Hollywood (1942)
- Miss Annie Rooney (1942)
- Pittsburgh (1942)
- Torpedo Boat (1942)
- Destroyer (1943)
- The Gang's All Here (1943)
- Hers to Hold (1943)
- Hit the Ice (1943)
- My Kingdom for a Cook (1943)
- Reveille with Beverly (1943)
- Janie (1944)
- Hi, Beautiful (1944)
- Heavenly Days (1944)
- Gambler's Choice (1944)
- Dark Mountain (1944)
- Can't Help Singing (1944)
- Together Again (1944)
- When Strangers Marry (1944)
- The Thin Man Goes Home (1945)
- Blazing the Western Trail (1945)
- Star in the Night (1945) - film short
- Danger Signal (1945)
- Her Highness and the Bellboy (1945)
- Her Lucky Night (1945)
- Out of This World (1945)
- Rhapsody in Blue (1945)
- She Gets Her Man (1945)
- Badman's Territory (1946)
- Night and Day (1946)
- So Goes My Love (1946)
- The Case of the Baby Sitter (1947)
- The Hat Box Mystery (1947)
- Trail Street (1947)
- One Man's Way (1964)
- How to Succeed in Business Without Really Trying (1967) as Cleaning Woman (uncredited)
- Big Daddy (1969)
- Slither (1973)
