= Adele Watson (actress) =

American actress (1890–1933)

- Born: January 3, 1890; Morris, Minnesota, United States
- Died: March 27, 1933 (aged 43); Los Angeles, California, United States
- Education: St. Catherine's College
- Occupation: Actor
- Years active: 1922–1932
- Era: 1920s · Pre-Code

Adele Watson (January 3, 1890 – March 27, 1933) was an American actress during the silent film era. She was known for her roles in romance films Once and Forever (1927), and Blue Skies (1929), and Street Scene (1931).

== Personal life and career ==
Adele Watson was born in Morris, Minnesota, in 1890. She studied at St. Catherine's College–now known as St. Catherine University–in St. Paul and specialized in music and dramatics.

Watson was known for her homely appearance and played various domestic roles. Due to her career being primarily in the pre-Code silent film era, many of her roles go uncredited. Outside of her acting career, she was also a school principal, a legislative assistant, a billing clerk, a cashier, and more.

She died from pneumonia in Los Angeles, California, in 1933.

== Filmography ==
Year	Name	Role	Notes
1922	The Lying Truth	Ellie Clairborne	
1922	Beyond the Rocks	Sarah – Theodora's Older Sister #2	Uncredited role
1923	Reno	Mrs. Tod Hake	
1924	Don't Doubt Your Husband	Mrs. Ruggles	
1925	Welcome Home	Annie	
1925	The Tower of Lies	Farmer's Wife	Uncredited role
1926	Rolling Home	Aunt	
1927	The Broken Gate	Gossip	
1927	Good as Gold	Timothea	
1927	A Harp in Hock	Investigator	
1927	Once and Forever	Henriette	
1928	The Night Bird	Maid	Uncredited role
1928	A Lady of Chance	Western Union Clerk	Uncredited role
1928	The Black Pearl	Sarah Runyan	
1929	Blue Skies	First Assistant Matron	Episode 1
1929	Why Is a Plumber?		Short film
1929	Cat, Dog & Co.	Snitcher	Short film; Uncredited role
1929	The Very Idea	Miss Duncan	
1929	Jazz Heaven	Miss Dunn	Uncredited role
1929	Saturday's Lesson	The Other Kids' Mom	Short film
1929	Navy Blues	Head of Ladies Uplift Society	Uncredited role
1929	This Thing Called Love	Secretary	
1930	Alias French Gertie	Miss Jenks	Uncredited role
1930	Common Clay	Maid	Uncredited role
1931	Once a Sinner	Lenore, Lounge Attendant	Uncredited role
1931	The Finger Points	Wheeler's Secretary	Uncredited role
1931	The Public Enemy		
1931	Street Scene	Olga Olsen	
1931	Expensive Women	Martha, Connie's maid	
1931	Compromised	Mrs. Bird	
1931	Arrowsmith	Mrs. Novak	Uncredited role
1932	The Famous Ferguson Case	Annie Murphin – Ferguson Housemaid	Uncredited role
1932	Choo-Choo!	Woman in Charge of the Orphans	Uncredited role
1932	The Purchase Price	Mrs. Sarah Tipton	Uncredited role
1932	Pack Up Your Troubles	Annie	
1932	Three on a Match	Ship's Nurse	Uncredited Role
1933	Treason	Flirtatious Old Maid	Uncredited role
1933	Pilgrimage	Mrs. Simms – Hannah's Neighbor	Uncredited role
