= The Midnight Special (film) =

1931 film

- Directed by: Duke Worne
- Written by: Arthur Hoerl (story, screenplay); Ehren Johns
- Produced by: George R. Batcheller
- Starring: Glenn Tryon; Merna Kennedy
- Cinematography: M.A. Anderson
- Edited by: Tom Persons
- Distributed by: Chesterfield Pictures - (state's rights)
- Release date: January 1, 1931
- Running time: 60 minutes
- Country: United States
- Language: English

The Midnight Special is a 1931 pre-Code sound film produced and released by independent film maker Chesterfield. It was directed by Duke Worne and starred Glenn Tryon and Merna Kennedy.

The film is preserved at the Library of Congress.

== Cast ==
- Glenn Tryon as Gerald Boone
- Merna Kennedy as Ellen Harboard
- Mary Carr as Mrs. Boone
- Phillips Smalley as Mr. Harboard
- Jimmy Aubrey as Joe
- Tom O'Brien as Dan Padden
- Norman Phillips Jr. as Billy
