= David Broekman =

Dutch-born American composer

- Born: c. 1900 – c. 1903; Leiden, Kingdom of the Netherlands
- Died: April 1, 1958 (aged 55 or 58) Fifth Avenue, Manhattan, New York City, US
- Genre: Traditional pop
- Occupations: Composer, violinist, score composer

David Broekman (c. 1900 – c. 1903 – April 1, 1958) was a Dutch-born American composer, violinist and film scorer.

== Biography ==
Broekman was born c. 1900 – c. 1903, in Leiden, Kingdom of the Netherlands. While living in the Netherlands, he orchestrated the Royal Opera House while living there. In 1924, he immigrated to the United States and joined the New York Philharmonic. He produced film soundtracks for studios such as Warner Bros., Columbia Pictures, and Universal Pictures, with him being musical director of the latter two in 1929 to 1931 and from 1932 to 1935, respectively. He later joined CBS.

During World War II, Broekman served as musical director for the United States Department of the Treasury. As which, he appeared in and recorded music for war bond projects. Following the war, he rejoined the New York Philharmonic, with him leading traditional pop concerts at Carnegie Hall with them. It was around this time he began scoring, with most of his early scoring being for films about the Cold War. He also served as the first musical director of Altec Lansing.

Broekman was a television scorer, having produced the soundtracks to shows such as Wide Wide World. He was nominated in 8th Primetime Emmy Awards, in the category "Best Musical Contribution". He also frequently appeared on the 1949 game show Think Fast, as a judge.

Broekman wrote an autobiography titled The Shoestring Symphony in 1948, which received a positive review from a reviewer of The New York Times. He composed the operas Barbara Allen, Manhattan Fairy Tale Suite, The Stranger, and The Toledo War.

Broekman died on April 1, 1958, aged 55 or 58, in his home in Fifth Avenue, of a heart attack.

== Film and television credits ==
Adopted from TV Guide.

- Submarine (1928)
- The Mississippi Gambler (1929)
- Skinner Steps Out (1929)
- Tonight at Twelve (1929)
- Outside the Law (1930)
- Roaring Ranch (1930)
- Platinum Blonde (1931)
- Scandal for Sale (1932)
- The Old Dark House (1932)
- Tomorrow at Seven (1933)
- The Law of the Wild (1934)
- The Cheyenne Tornado (1935)
- Danger (1950–1955)
- The Best of Broadway (1954–1955)
- Wide Wide World (1955–1958)
- Crowded Paradise (1956)
