= Once and Forever =

1927 film

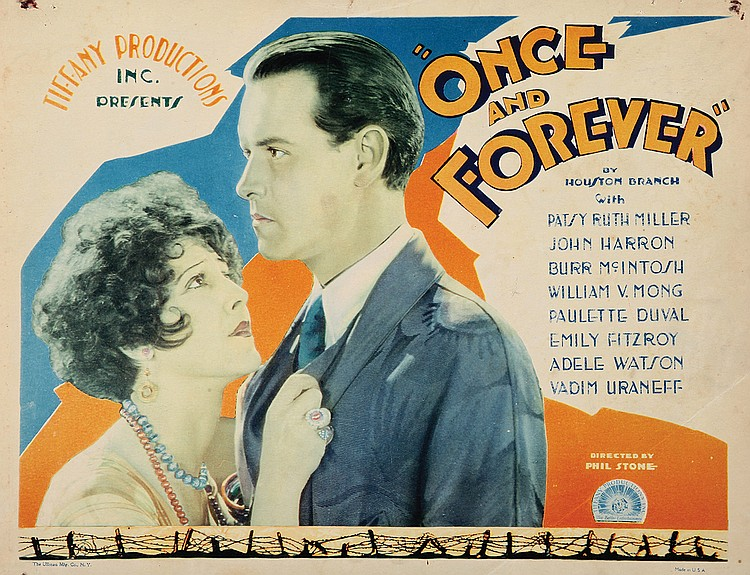
- Lobby card
- Directed by: Phil Goldstone
- Written by: Houston Branch
- Produced by: Lou L. Ostrow
- Starring: Patsy Ruth Miller; John Harron; Burr McIntosh
- Cinematography: Max Dupont; E. Fox Walker
- Edited by: Martin G. Cohn
- Production company: Tiffany Pictures
- Distributed by: Tiffany Pictures
- Release date: October 15, 1927
- Running time: 60 minutes
- Country: United States
- Language: Silent (English intertitles)

Once and Forever is a 1927 American silent drama film directed by Phil Goldstone and starring Patsy Ruth Miller, John Harron, and Burr McIntosh.

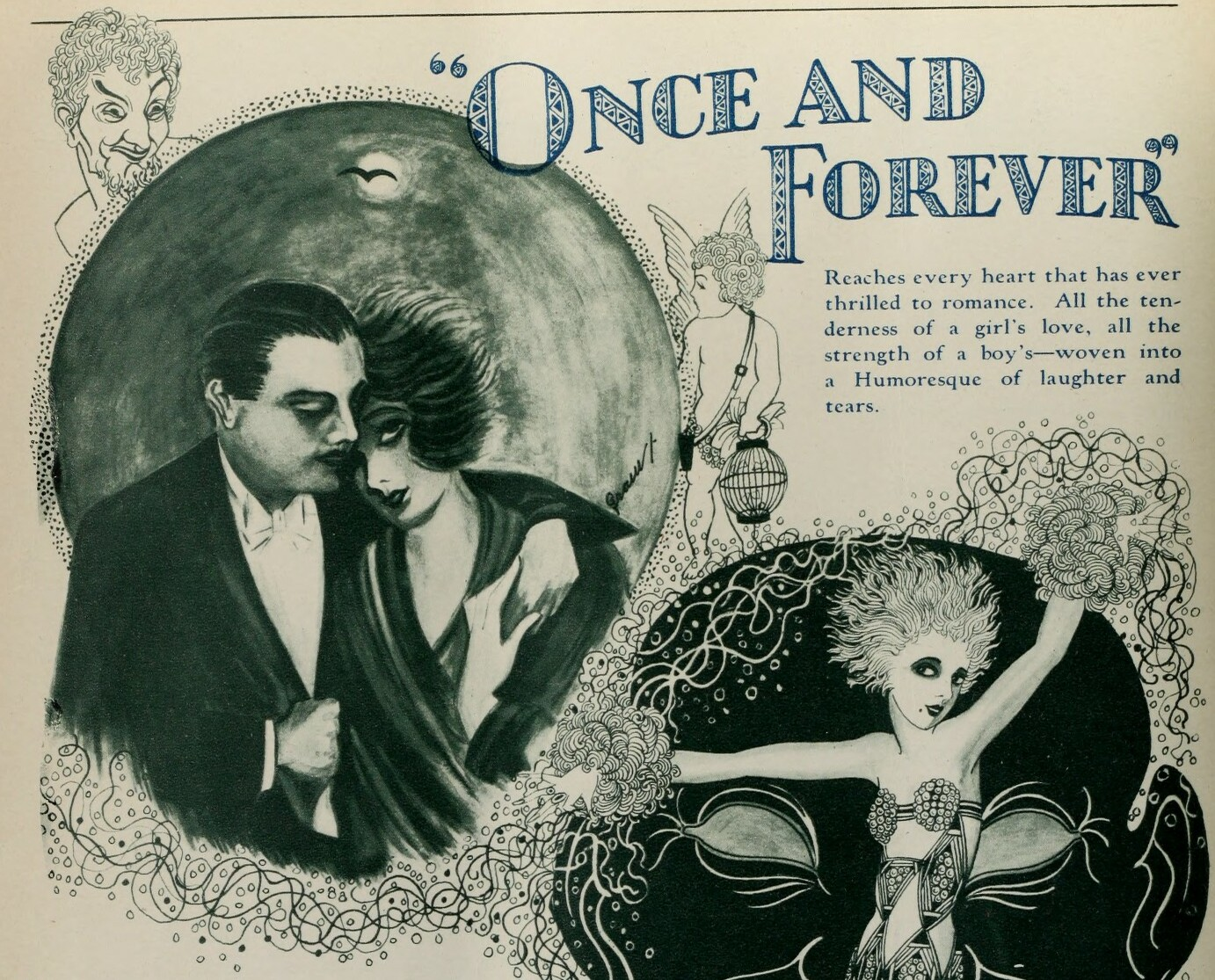
Once and Forever ad, 1927

The film's sets were designed by the art director George Sawley.

== Cast ==
- Patsy Ruth Miller as Antoinette
- John Harron as Georges
- Burr McIntosh as Governor
- Emily Fitzroy as Katherine
- Adele Watson as Henriette
- Vadim Uraneff as Axel

== Preservation ==
A print of Once and Forever with one reel missing is held in the BFI National Archive.

== Bibliography ==
- Munden, Kenneth White. The American Film Institute Catalog of Motion Pictures Produced in the United States, Part 1. University of California Press, 1997.
