= The Cow's Kimono =

1926 film

- Lobby card
- Directed by: Fred Guiol; James Parrott
- Produced by: Hal Roach
- Starring: Glenn Tryon
- Release date: June 20, 1926
- Country: United States
- Languages: Silent film English intertitles

The Cow's Kimono is a 1926 American film starring Glenn Tryon and featuring Oliver Hardy. Hardy's scenes would later be deleted.

== Plot ==
This summary comes from the original Library of Congress copyright filing:

Glenn and Vivian, newlyweds, are touring the wide open spaces on their honeymoon. They come to a farmhouse where they put up for the night. The rancher's daughter is a two-gun woman and she has nightmares which scare everybody nearly out of their wits. After a night with her and a day being chased by a bull, the newlyweds decide that the east is safer if not quite so exciting.

— Hal Roach, scenario

== Cast ==
- Glenn Tryon
- Charles Sellon as The father
- Oliver Hardy (scenes deleted)

== See also ==
- Oliver Hardy filmography
