= Hot Heels =

1928 film

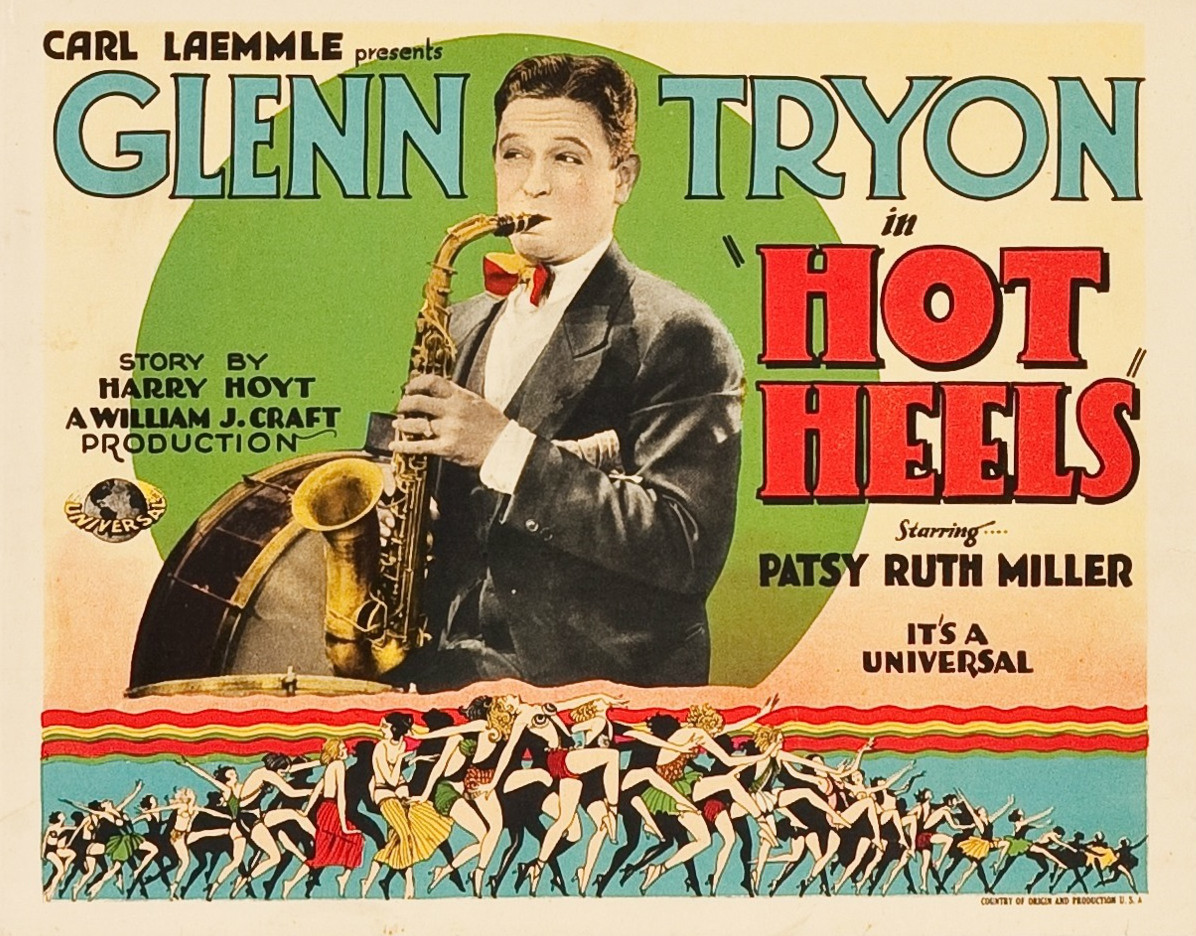
- Lobby card
- Directed by: William James Craft
- Produced by: Carl Laemmle
- Starring: Glenn Tryon; Patsy Ruth Miller
- Cinematography: Arthur L. Todd
- Edited by: Charles Craft
- Distributed by: Universal Pictures
- Release date: May 13, 1928 (U.S.)
- Running time: 6 reels
- Country: United States
- Language: Silent (English intertitles)

Hot Heels is a lost 1928 American silent comedy film directed by William James Craft and starring Glenn Tryon and Patsy Ruth Miller. It was produced and distributed by Universal Pictures.

A trailer for the film survives.

== Cast ==
- Glenn Tryon as Glenn Seth Higgins
- Patsy Ruth Miller as Patsy Jones
- Greta Yoltz as Fannie
- James Bradbury Sr. as Mr. Fitch
- Tod Sloan as Himself, A Jockey
- Lloyd Whitlock as Manager Carter
- Edward Hearn as Gambler
- Walter Brennan as Pool Hall Inhabitant (uncredited)
