= The Mississippi Gambler (1929 film) =

1929 film directed by Reginald Barker

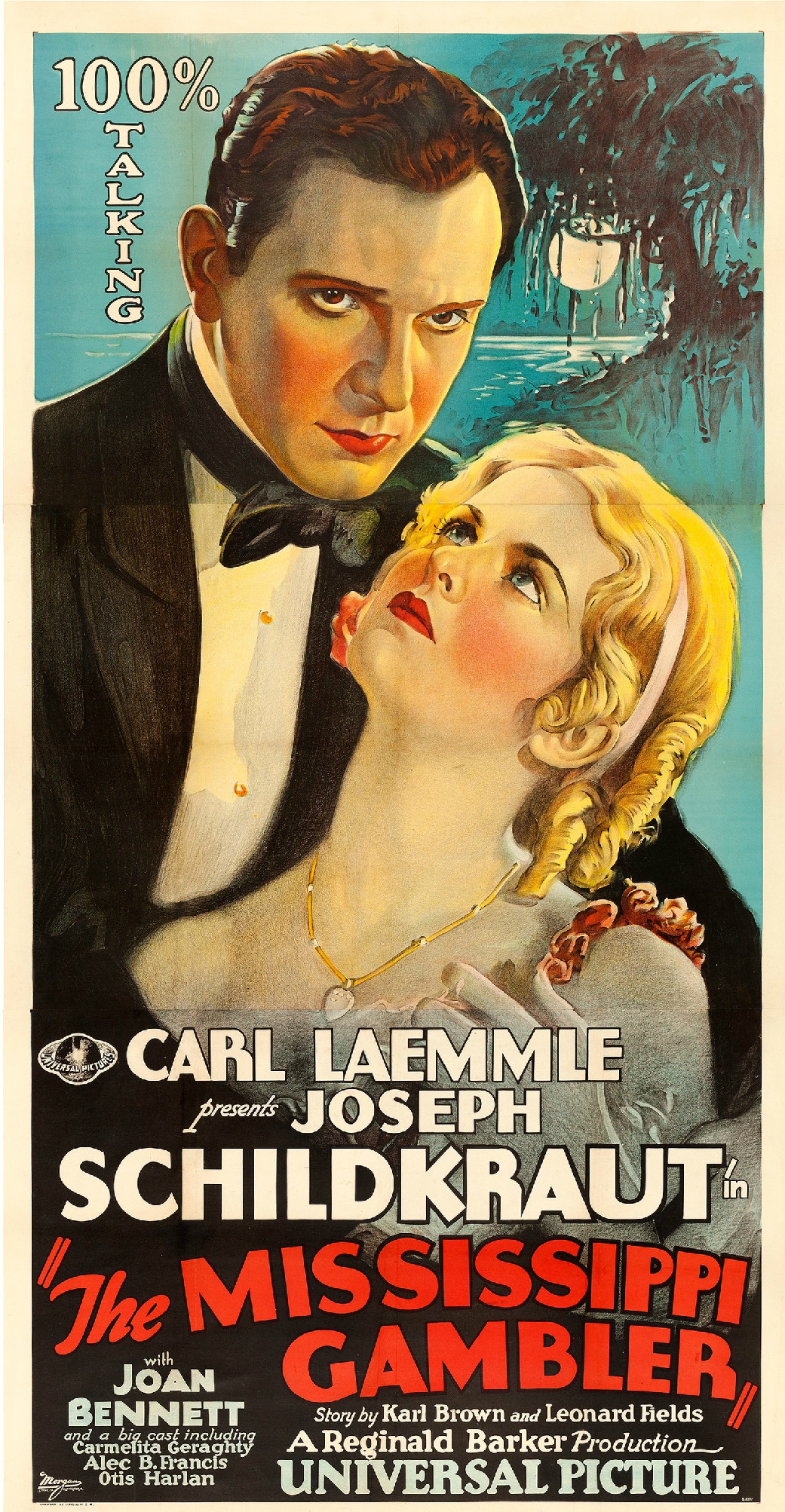
- Theatrical poster
- Directed by: Reginald Barker
- Written by: Edward T. Lowe Jr. Dialogue: Winifred Reeve; H.H. Van Loan; Titles: Dudley Early
- Story by: Karl Brown; Leonard Fields
- Starring: Joseph Schildkraut; Joan Bennett
- Cinematography: Gilbert Warrenton
- Edited by: Robert B. Wilcox
- Music by: David Broekman
- Distributed by: Universal Pictures
- Release date: November 3, 1929
- Running time: 57 min
- Country: United States
- Language: English

The Mississippi Gambler is a 1929 American romantic drama film directed by Reginald Barker, and starring Joseph Schildkraut and Joan Bennett. While this early Universal Pictures talkie used a Western Electric Movietone sound-on-film system, it was also released in a silent version.

== Cast ==
- Joseph Schildkraut as Jack Morgan
- Joan Bennett as Lucy Blackburn
- Carmelita Geraghty as Suzette Richards
- Alec B. Francis as Junius Blackburn
- Otis Harlan as Tiny Beardsley
- William Welsh as Captain Weathers

== See also ==
- List of early sound feature films (1926–1929)
