= Merna Kennedy =

American actress

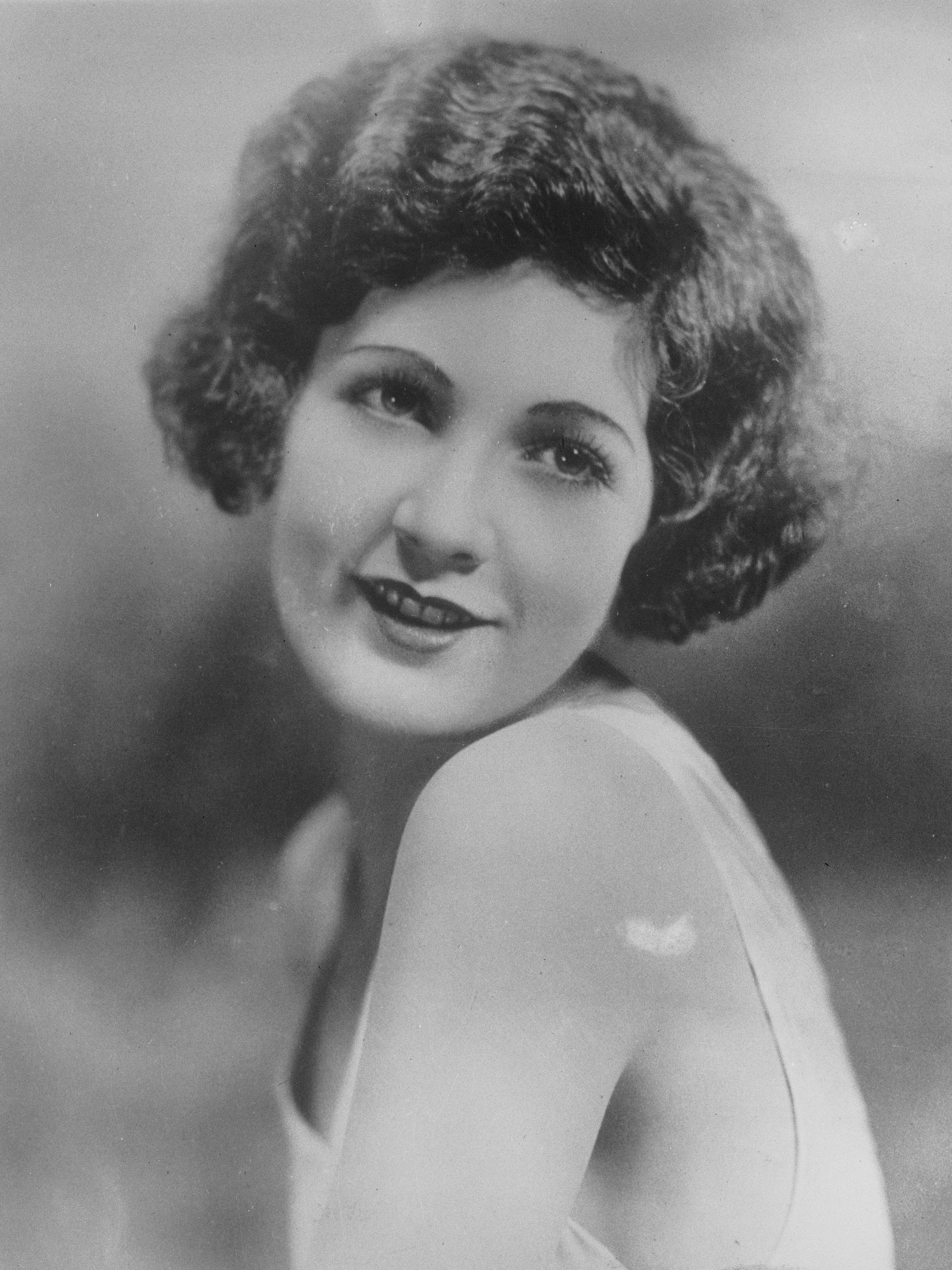
- Kennedy in 1933
- Born: Maude Kahler; September 7, 1908; Kankakee, Illinois, U.S.
- Died: December 20, 1944 (aged 36); Los Angeles California, U.S.
- Resting place: Inglewood Park Cemetery, California
- Occupation: Actress
- Years active: 1928–1934
- Spouses: Busby Berkeley (m. 1934; div. 1935); Forrest Brayton (m. 1944)

Merna Kennedy (born Maude Kahler; September 7, 1908 – December 20, 1944) was an American actress of the late silent era and the transitional period into talkies.

== Career ==
She was born in Kankakee, one of two children to Maud (née Reed) and John Kahler, a German-American butcher turned chiropractor. After her parents separated, her mother moved the family to California, where she married a grocer two years later, and changed their name to Kennedy. At the outbreak of World War I, their mother prepped seven-year-old Merna and brother Melvin (known as Merle) to tour as a dancing and singing sibling act on the Orpheum and Pantages theater circuits of vaudeville, where she became acquainted with Lita Grey. Merle broke his leg ending the duo, prompting Grey to suggest silent films to Merna.

Kennedy was best known during her brief career for her role opposite Charlie Chaplin in the silent film The Circus (1928), a role for which she was brought to the attention of Chaplin by her friend Lita Grey, who became Chaplin's second wife in 1924. She had red hair and muscular legs (due to being a dancer,) the latter of which helped her gain the role of the circus bareback rider.

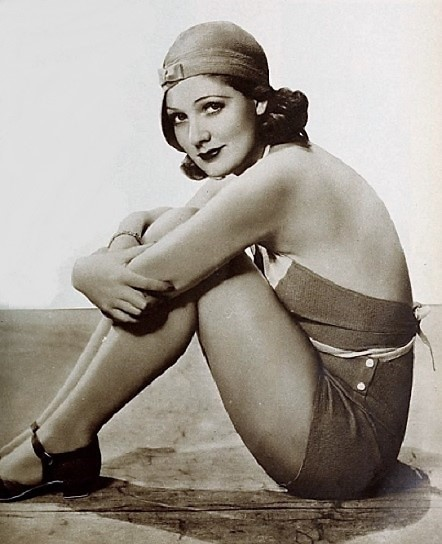
Kennedy in May 1933

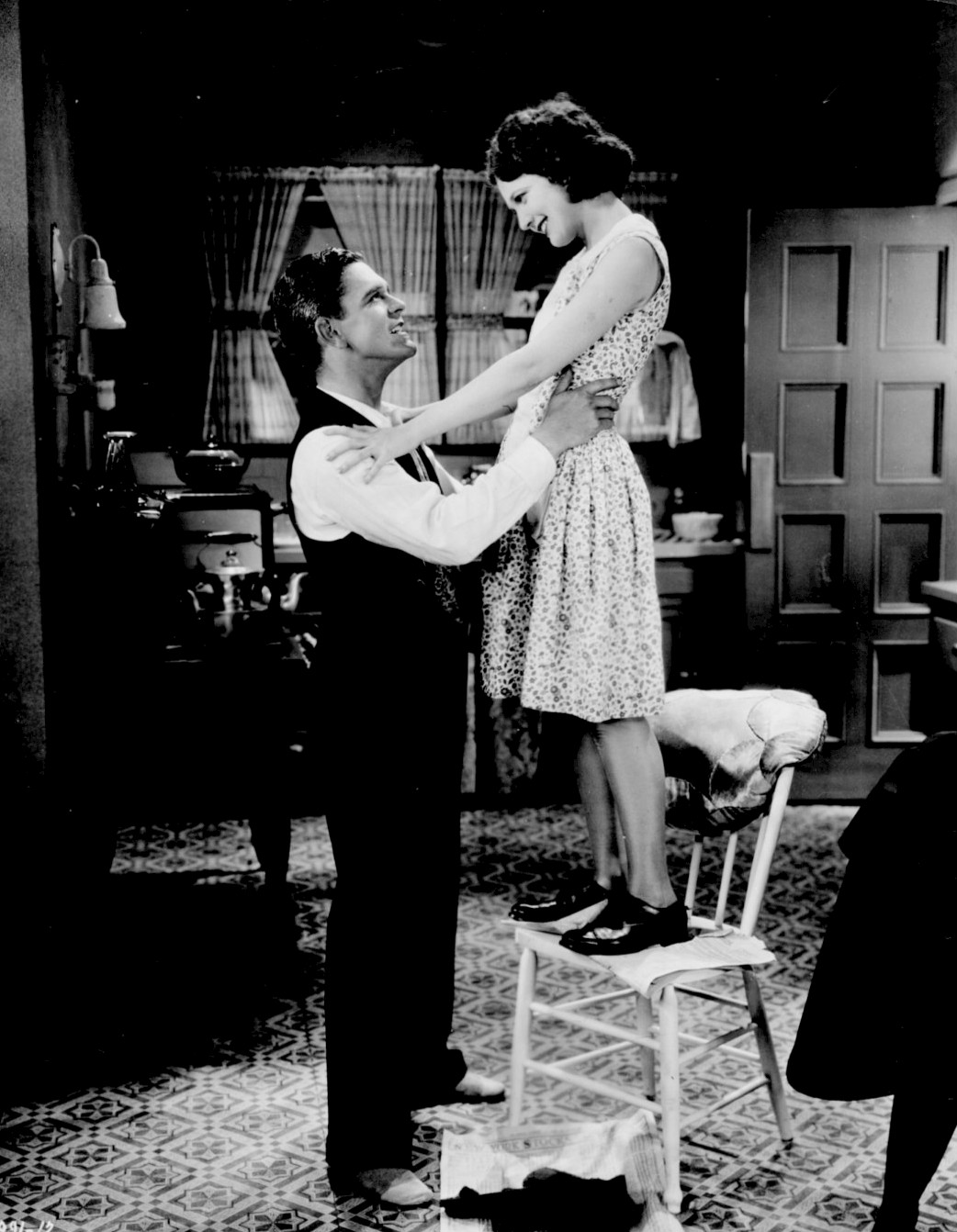
Kennedy and Glenn Tryon in the film Skinner Steps Out (1929)

Kennedy continued acting after The Circus, starring in early sound films, but retired in 1934 when she married choreographer/director Busby Berkeley on February 10, 1934 at Hollywood United Methodist Church. Their marriage broke up by 1936.

== Death ==
Kennedy died at age 36 of a heart attack on December 20, 1944, four days after her marriage to Master Sergeant Forrest Brayton. She is buried at Inglewood Park Cemetery, Inglewood, California.

== Filmography ==
Year	Title	Role	Notes
1928	The Circus	The Ringmaster's Step-daughter, a Circus Rider	
1929	Broadway	Billie Moore	Silent and sound versions both released.
1929	Barnum Was Right	Miriam Locke	Silent and sound versions both released.
1929	Skinner Steps Out	'Honey' Skinner	Silent and sound versions both released.
1930	The Rampant Age	Doris Lawrance	
1930	Embarrassing Moments	Marion Fuller	
1930	The King of Jazz	Second Reporter/ Wife/ Unmarried Wife	Appears in the following segments: "Ladies of the Press" and "In Conference"
1930	Worldly Goods	Mary Thurston	Credited as Myrna Kennedy
1930	The Midnight Special	Ellen Harboard	
1931	Stepping Out	Madge Horton	
1931	The Gay Buckaroo	Midlred Fields	
1932	Lady with a Past	Ann Duryea	
1932	Ghost Valley	Jane Worth	
1932	Come On, Tarzan	Pat Riley	
1932	The All American	Gloria Neuchard	
1932	The Red-Haired Alibi	Lynn Monith	
1933	Laughter in Hell	Marybelle Evans	
1933	Emergency Call	Day File Clerk	
1933	Easy Millions		
1933	Don't Bet on Love	Ruby 'Babe' Norton	
1933	I Love That Man	Alice	Scenes deleted
1933	Arizona to Broadway	Flo Sandberg	
1933	Wanted	Eveyln	Original title: "Police Call"
1933	The Big Chance	Mary Wilson	
1933	Son of a Sailor	Isabel	
1934	Wonder Bar	Claire	
1934	Jimmy the Gent	Jitters (Typist)	
1934	I Like It That Way	Telephone Company Information Girl	Final role
