= Crowded Paradise =

1956 film

- Directed by: Fred Pressburger
- Written by: Marc Connelly; Arthur Forrest
- Produced by: Ben Gradus
- Starring: Hume Cronyn; Nancy Kelly; Frank Silvera
- Cinematography: Boris Kaufman
- Edited by: Rita Roland
- Music by: David Broekman
- Production company: Ben Gradus Productions
- Distributed by: Tudor Pictures
- Release date: June 21, 1956
- Running time: 94 minutes
- Country: United States
- Language: English

Crowded Paradise is a 1956 American drama film directed by Fred Pressburger and starring Hume Cronyn, Nancy Kelly and Frank Silvera .

== Cast ==
- Hume Cronyn as George Heath
- Nancy Kelly as Louise Heath
- Frank Silvera as Papa Diaz
- Enid Rudd as Felicia Diaz
- Mario Alcalde as Juan Figueroa
- Stefan Schnabel as Big Man
