= Patsy Ruth Miller =

American actress (1904-1995)

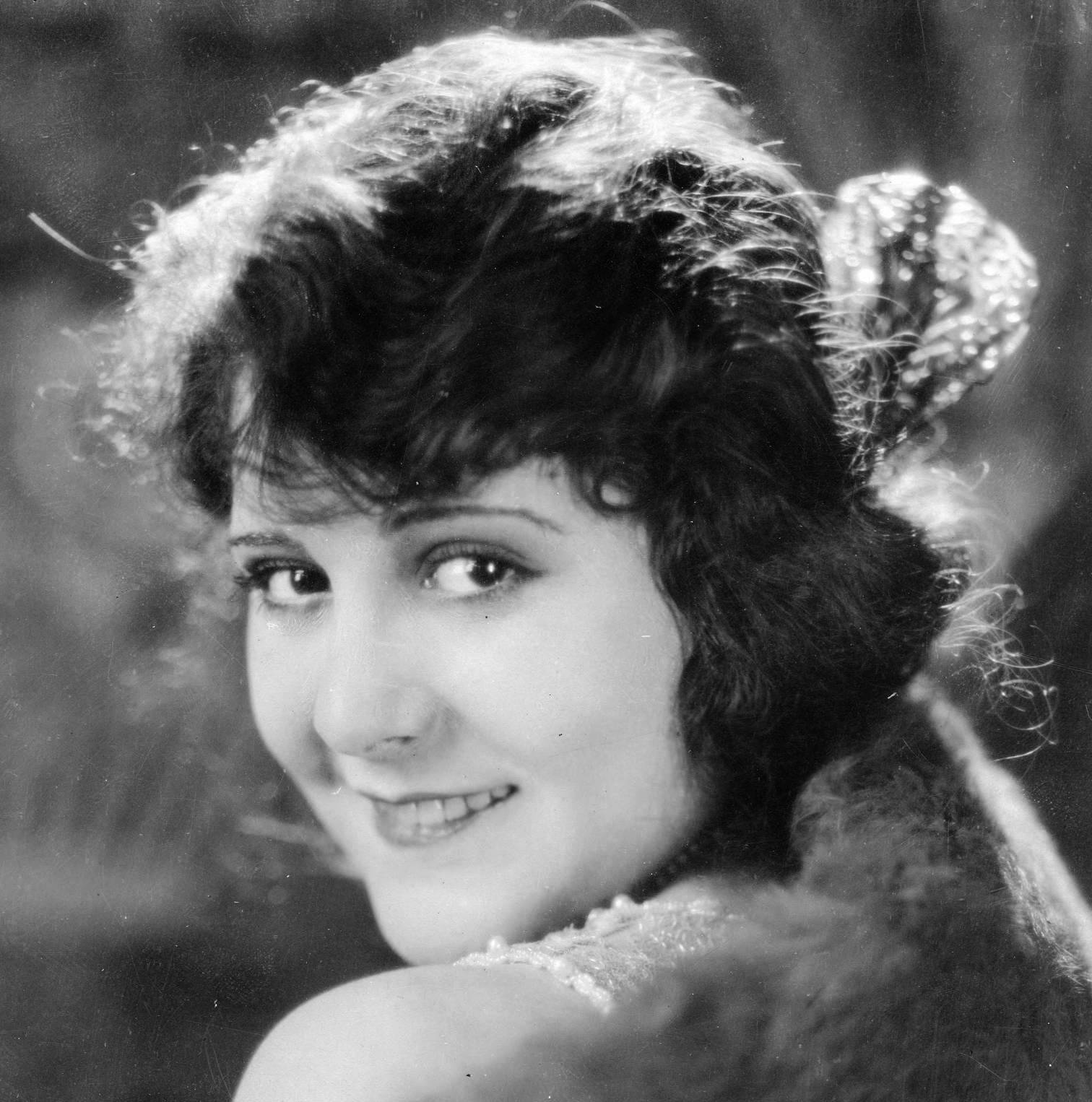
- Miller in 1922
- Born: Patricia Ruth Miller; January 17, 1904; St. Louis, Missouri, U.S.
- Died: July 16, 1995 (aged 91); Palm Desert, California, U.S.
- Occupations: Actress; writer
- Years active: 1921–1978
- Spouses: Tay Garnett (m. 1929; div. 1933) John Lee Mahin (m. 1937; div. 1946) Effingham Smith Deans (m. 1951; died 1986)

Patsy Ruth Miller (born Patricia Ruth Miller; January 17, 1904 – July 16, 1995) was an American film actress who played Esméralda in The Hunchback of Notre Dame (1923) opposite Lon Chaney.

== Early years ==
Miller, the daughter of Mr. and Mrs. Oscar W. Miller, was born and raised in St. Louis, Missouri. As a girl, she had a screen test in Hollywood, but her mother was advised to take her home because she had no potential to be an actress. She was born Ruth Mae Miller but changed her name to avoid confusion with another actress, Ruth Miller, who was already active in film. She attended Mary Institute in St. Louis.

== Career ==
After being discovered by actress Alla Nazimova at a Hollywood party, Miller got her first break with a small role in Camille, which starred Rudolph Valentino. Her roles gradually improved, and she was chosen as a WAMPAS Baby Star in 1922. In 1923, she was acclaimed for her performance as Esmeralda in The Hunchback of Notre Dame opposite Lon Chaney.

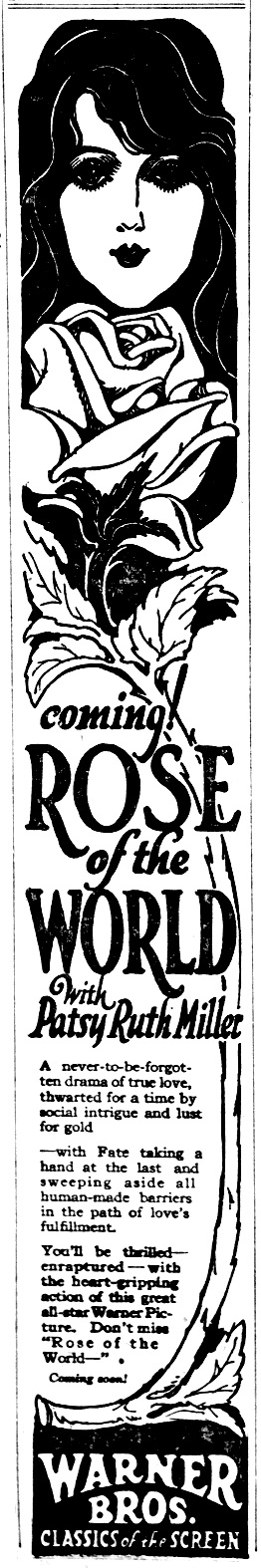
Advertisement for Rose of the World (1926)

In the later part of the decade Miller appeared chiefly in light romantic comedies, opposite such actors as Clive Brook and Edward Everett Horton. Among her film credits in the late 1920s are Broken Hearts of Hollywood (1926), A Hero for a Night (1927), Hot Heels (1928), and The Aviator (1929). She retired from films in 1931. She may have attempted a comeback when she appeared on stage in 1933 in "Eve the Fifth" at Harold Lloyd's Beverly Hills Little Theatre for Professionals, although her intentions are not clear. She made a cameo appearance in the 1951 film Quebec, which starred John Barrymore Jr., and stated in her autobiography that she had participated as a joke. She came out of retirement to do the film Mother in 1978 by Brian Pinette. She later achieved recognition as a writer. She won three O. Henry Awards for her short stories, wrote a novel, radio scripts, and plays. She also performed for a brief time on Broadway.

== Personal life ==
Miller was married three times. The first two marriages ended in divorce. Her first husband was film director Tay Garnett and the second was screenwriter John Lee Mahin. Her third husband, businessman E. S. Deans, died in 1986. The frequent news about her love life once earned Miller the nickname "the most engaged girl in Hollywood."

== Book ==
In 1988, MagicImage Filmbooks published Miller's autobiography My Hollywood: When Both of Us Were Young (ISBN 978-1593934897). Reviewer Richard Brody of The New Yorker called the memoir "a hidden masterwork of the genre".

== Death ==
Patsy Ruth Miller died at her home at the age of 91 in Palm Desert, California.

== Partial filmography ==
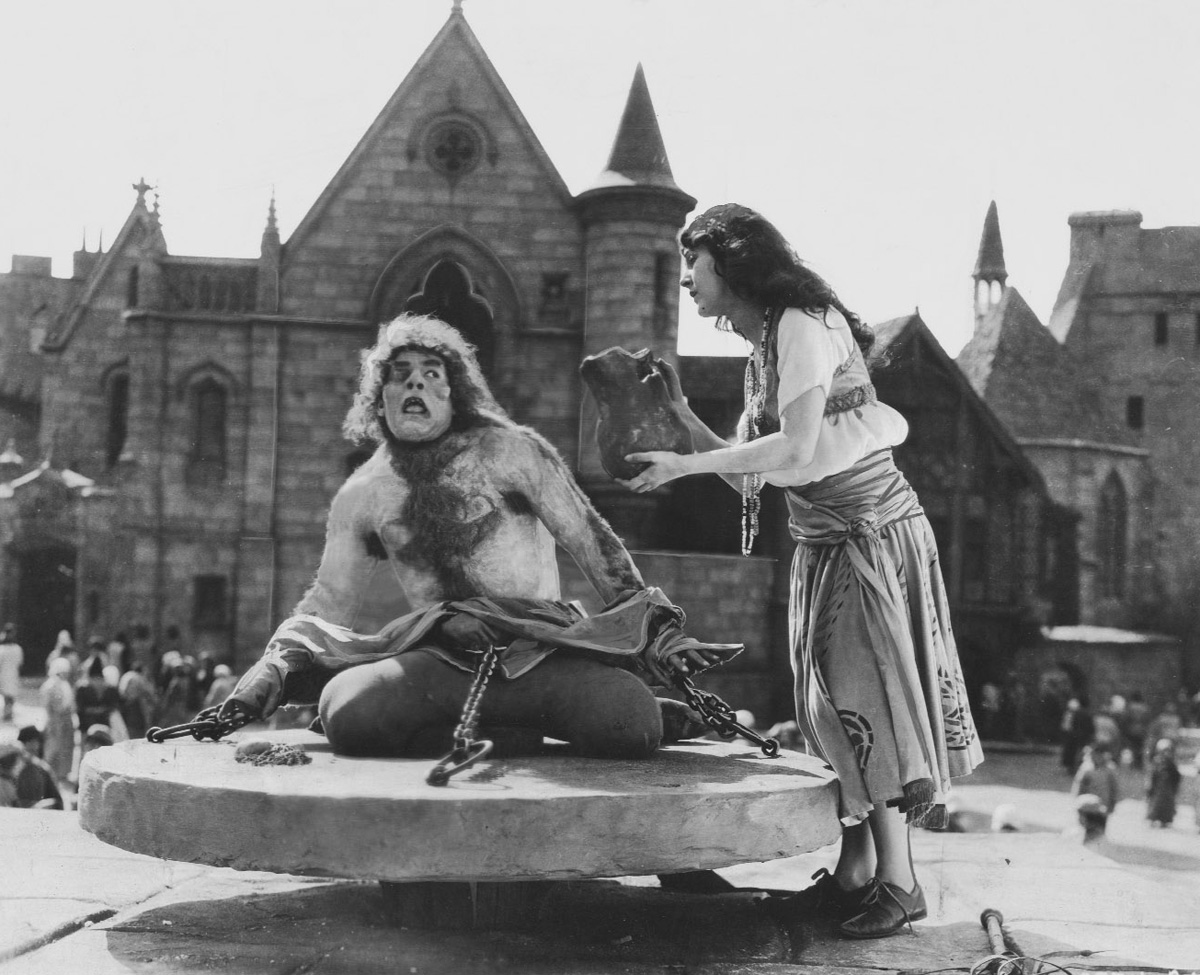
Miller with Lon Chaney in The Hunchback of Notre Dame

- One a Minute (1921)
- Camille (1921)
- Watch Your Step (1922)
- For Big Stakes (1922)
- Trimmed (1922)
- The Fighting Streak (1922)
- Fortune's Mask (1922)
- Omar the Tentmaker (1922)
- Handle with Care (1922)
- The Drivin' Fool (1923)
- The Hunchback of Notre Dame (1923)
- The Girl I Loved (1923)
- My Man (1924)
- Those Who Judge (1924)
- Fools in the Dark (1924)
- The Yankee Consul (1924)
- The Breath of Scandal (1924)
- Daughters of Today (1924)
- Her Husband's Secret (1925)
- Back to Life (1925)
- Head Winds (1925)
- Red Hot Tires (1925)
- The Girl on the Stairs (1925)
- Lorraine of the Lions (1925)
- Rose of the World (1925)
- Hogan's Alley (1925)
- Why Girls Go Back Home (1926)
- Hell-Bent for Heaven (1926)
- So This Is Paris (1926)
- The Fighting Edge (1926)
- Broken Hearts of Hollywood (1926)
- Private Izzy Murphy (1926)
- The King of the Turf (1926)
- The White Black Sheep (1926)
- The First Auto (1927)
- South Sea Love (1927)
- Shanghaied (1927)
- Once and Forever (1927)
- A Hero for a Night (1927)
- Hot Heels (1928)
- Marriage by Contract (1928)
- We Americans (1928)
- The Tragedy of Youth (1928)
- Red Riders of Canada (1928)
- Beautiful But Dumb (1928)
- Tropical Nights (1928)
- The Hottentot (1929)
- So Long Letty (1929)
- The Aviator (1929)
- The Fall of Eve (1929)
- Whispering Winds (1929)
- Wide Open (1930)
- Lonely Wives (1931)
- Night Beat (1931)
- The Last of the Lone Wolf (1931)
- Quebec (1951)
- Mother (1978) by Brian Pinette with Coleen Gray
