= So This Is Paris (1926 film) =

Film by Ernst Lubitsch

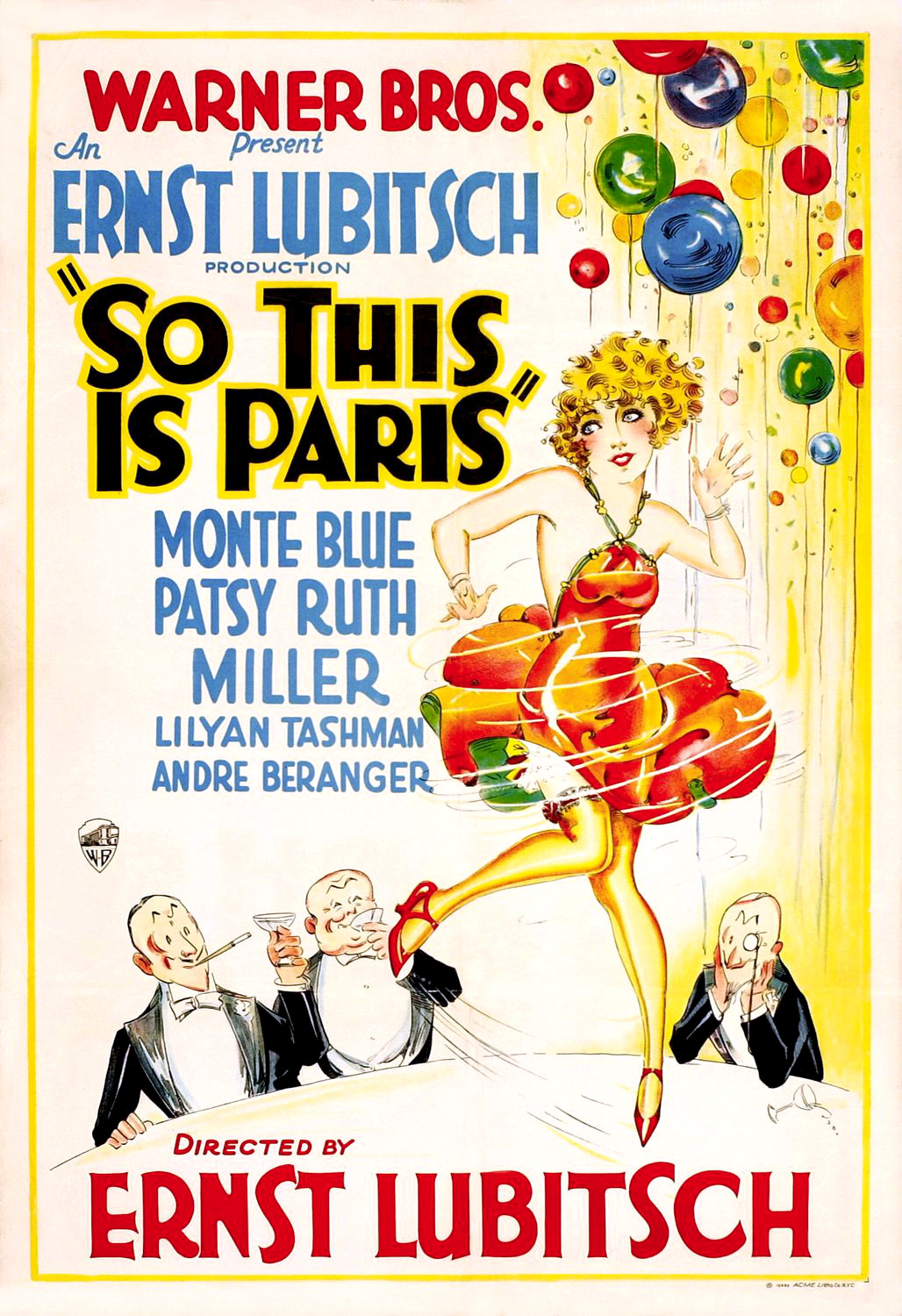
- Theatrical release poster
- Directed by: Ernst Lubitsch
- Written by: Hans Kraly (screen adaptation); Rob Wagner (titles); Robert E. Hopkins (titles)
- Based on: Le Reveillon; 1872 play by Henri Meilhac; Ludovic Halévy
- Starring: Monte Blue; Patsy Ruth Miller; Lilyan Tashman; Andre Beranger
- Cinematography: John J. Mescall
- Production company: Warner Bros.
- Distributed by: Warner Bros.
- Release date: July 31, 1926
- Running time: 80 minutes
- Country: United States
- Language: Silent (English intertitles)
- Budget: $253,000
- Box office: $310,000

So This Is Paris is a 1926 American silent comedy film produced and distributed by Warner Bros. and directed by Ernst Lubitsch. It is based on the 1872 stage play Le Reveillon by Henri Meilhac and Ludovic Halévy. It stars Monte Blue and Patsy Ruth Miller.

== Plot ==
So This Is Paris (1926)

Paul and Suzanne Giraud are happily married and living in a quiet neighborhood. When Suzanne notices that their new neighbors are expressive dancers in revealing outfits, she demands Paul speak to them about their lack of morality. Paul discovers that the woman is Georgette Lalle, an old flame. Paul does not respond to Georgette's displays of affection and instead introduces himself to her husband, Maurice. Back at home, Paul lies about his meeting with the Lalles, which confuses Suzanne when Maurice returns the visit moments later. Suzanne and Maurice exchange flirtations, which Paul overhears.

Paul is on his way to a secret meeting with Georgette when he is stopped by a police officer for speeding. After insulting the officer, Paul is charged, convicted and sentenced to three days in prison. As Paul dresses up for a night out at the Artists' Ball with Georgette, he convinces Suzanne that he is heading to jail to serve his three-day sentence.

While Paul and Georgette are enjoying themselves and dancing the Charleston, Maurice visits Suzanne and they grow intimate. They are interrupted by a detective, who has come to arrest Paul for failing to serve his sentence. Fearing a scandal, Suzanne convinces Maurice to pose as her husband and he unhappily complies, but he steals a number of kisses before leaving. Meanwhile, she overhears through the radio that Paul and Georgette are the winners of a Charleston contest at the Artists' Ball. Suzanne confronts her drunken husband at the Ball and tells him that, thanks to her pleading, he will not have to go to jail. They reunite.

Maurice sends Georgette a telegram telling her that he has been sent to a sanatorium for three days, which she finds comical. The next morning at breakfast, Paul and Suzanne are having a blissful breakfast when the morning paper is delivered. It features an article about Paul's (but really Maurice's) tender goodbye and Suzanne becomes nervous that Paul will realize the truth. Instead, he laughs heartily, saying, "That shows how much you can believe in the newspapers." They laugh and kiss.

== Cast ==
- Monte Blue as Doctor Paul Giraud
- Patsy Ruth Miller as Suzanne Giraud
- Lilyan Tashman as Georgette Lalle
- Andre Beranger as Maurice Lalle
- Dot Farley as Madame Moreau
- Myrna Loy as The Maid
- Sidney D'Albrook as The Policeman
- Max Barwyn as The Detective

== Reception ==
The film received positive reviews and was voted by The New York Times as one of the ten best films of 1926. The paper's film critic, Mordaunt Hall, wrote that "in So This Is Paris, [Lubitsch's] tour de force is an extraordinarily brilliant conception of an eye full of a Charleston contest, with vibrant kaleidoscopic changes from feet and figures to the omnipotent saxophones. [..] The comedy in this film had, up to that time, kept the audience in constant explosions of laughter, but the startling dissolving scenic effects and varied "shots" elicited a hearty round of applause."

=== Box office ===
According to Warner Bros. records, the film earned $258,000 domestically and $52,000 foreign.

== Preservation ==
Prints of So This Is Paris are held by:

- the Library of Congress (35mm print),
- the Museum of Modern Art,
- Cineteca del Friuli in Gemona del Friuli (16mm print),
- the British Film Institute,
- the Wisconsin Center for Film and Theater Research in Madison, Wisconsin,
- Cinematheque Royale de Belgique,
- the UCLA Film & Television Archive (16mm print),
- and Cinémathèque française
