= A Hero for a Night =

1927 film by William James Craft

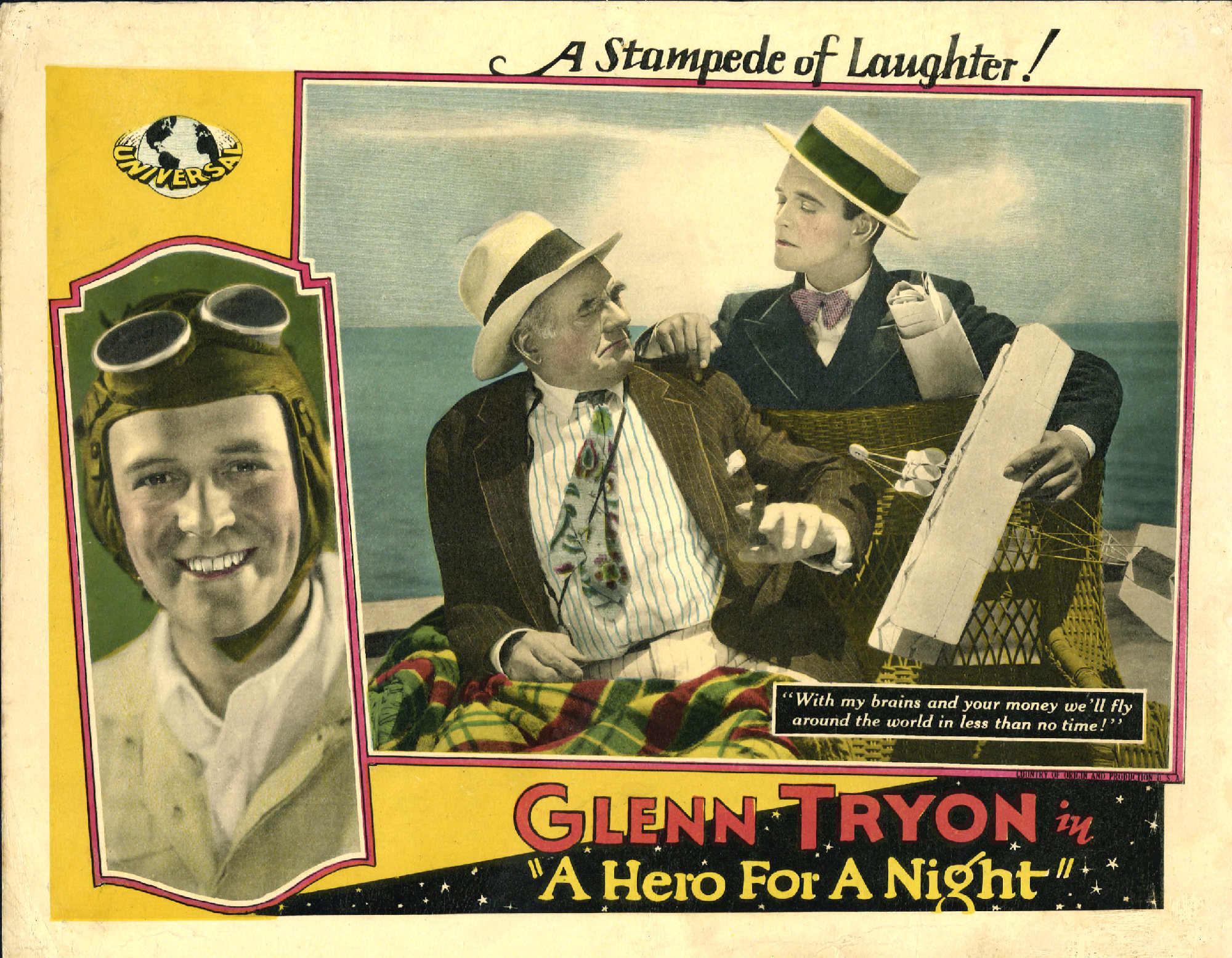
- Lobby card
- Directed by: William James Craft
- Written by: Harry O. Hoyt (story); Albert DeMond (titles)
- Produced by: Carl Laemmle
- Starring: Glenn Tryon; Patsy Ruth Miller
- Cinematography: George Robinson
- Edited by: Charles Craft
- Production company: Universal Pictures
- Distributed by: Universal Pictures
- Release date: December 18, 1927
- Running time: 60 minutes; 6 reels
- Country: United States
- Language: Silent (English intertitles)

A Hero for a Night is a 1927 American silent comedy film directed by William James Craft and produced and distributed by Universal Pictures, cashing in on the "Lindy craze", generated by Charles Lindbergh's famous ocean crossing flight. The film stars Glenn Tryon, Patsy Ruth Miller and Burr McIntosh.

== Plot ==
Hiram Hastings (Glenn Tryon), who drives a taxi at an eastern United States summer resort, wants to become an aviator. He takes a correspondence course in aviation and builds his own aircraft, hoping to enter a race from New York to Europe. Samuel Sloan (Burr McIntosh), a wealthy soap manufacturer, arrives with his daughter Mary (Patsy Ruth Miller), a trained nurse (Ruth Dwyer), and his confidential secretary (Lloyd Whitlock), the last two secretly plotting to get Sloan's holdings.

Hiram, infatuated with Mary, crashes a banquet in honor of a visiting French aviator and takes it upon himself to be the speaker of the evening. Although he is ejected, Hiriam perseveres.

Mary learns of the plot against her father and with the aid of Hiram and his aircraft sets out for New York, but Hiram pilots them across the ocean into Russia and there makes a forced landing. The success of the flight, however, saves the Sloan fortune.

== Cast ==
- Glenn Tryon as Hiram Hastings
- Patsy Ruth Miller as Mary Sloan
- Burr McIntosh as Samuel Sloan
- Lloyd Whitlock as Jack Ferber
- Robert Milasch as Bill Donovan
- Ruth Dwyer as Nurse Mack
- Leo White in a bit part (uncredited)

== Production ==
In the era of Charles Lindbergh's ocean crossing flight, the Curtiss Model D Headless pusher that Glenn Tryon flies, which is depicted in some lobby art, would have been an antique by 1927. The Curtiss "Pusher" was a replica created by Al Wilson for use in air fairs as well in Hollywood features. Several early Curtiss Pushers were still airworthy in 1927 but the rapid advance in aviation made them obsolete especially just prior to World War I and after. (Note: Al Wilson nearly lost his life when his Curtiss Pusher replica caught on fire while he was performing in an air show. He barely made it down to the ground before the aircraft was consumed by fire.)

== Reception ==
Aviation historian Michael Paris in From the Wright Brothers to Top Gun: Aviation, Nationalism, and Popular Cinema (1995) described the frenzy of trying to woo Lindbergh to do a film. Hollywood resorted to a spate of aviation-related features including Publicity Madness (1927), Flying Romeos (1928) and A Hero for a Night, even the Walt Disney Studios' Plane Crazy (1928), all comedy spoofs of the Lindbergh transatlantic flight.

Aviation film historian Stephen Pendo, in Aviation in the Cinema (1985) noted A Hero for a Night involved "high jinks" in the air. Aviation film historian James Farmer in Celluloid Wings: The Impact of Movies on Aviation (1984) considered A Hero for a Night, a "comedic melodrama."

=== Preservation status ===
A Hero for a Night survives and has been released on DVD.
