= Burr McIntosh =

American actor

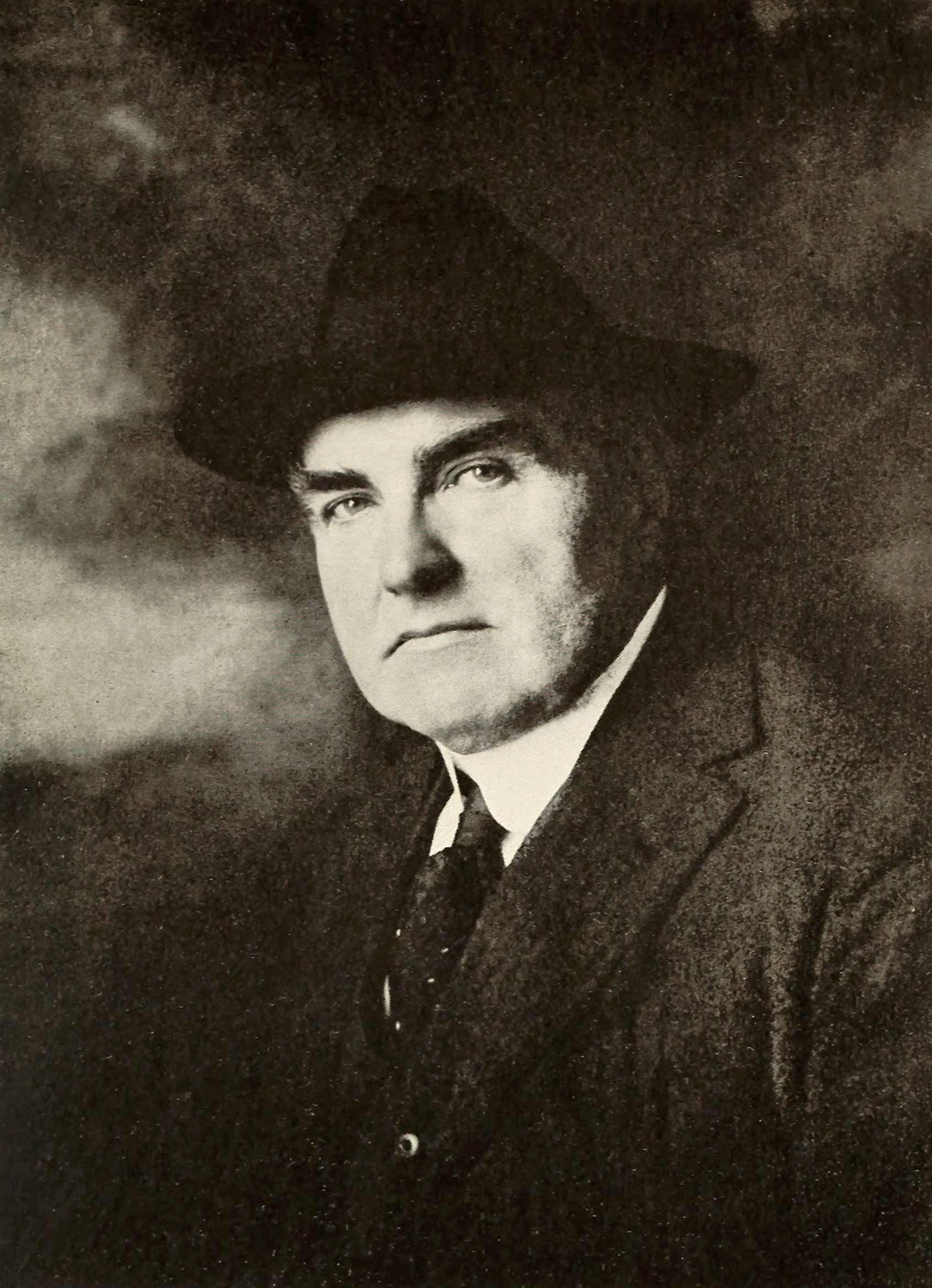
- Burr McIntosh, 1918
- Born: William Burr McIntosh; August 21, 1862; Wellsville, Ohio, US
- Died: April 28, 1942 (aged 79); Hollywood, California, US
- Occupations: Lecturer, photographer, film studio owner, silent film actor, author, publisher
- Years active: 1880s–1934

William Burr McIntosh (August 21, 1862 – April 28, 1942) was an American lecturer, photographer, film studio owner, silent film actor, author, publisher of The Burr McIntosh Monthly, reporter and a pioneer in the early film and radio business.

== Life and career ==
He was born in Wellsville, Ohio, the son of William A. McIntosh (died 1921) and his wife Minerva née Bottenberg (died 1883). His father was the president of a public company, New York and Cleveland Gas Coal Company, and a member of the South Fork Fishing and Hunting Club. The club's activities were blamed (but the members were not held legally responsible) for the failure of the South Fork Dam, which caused the Johnstown Flood in 1889 that resulted in the loss of over 2,200 lives in Johnstown, Pennsylvania. His sister Nancy McIntosh, an operatic soprano, was the protege, adopted daughter and heiress to the estate of W. S. Gilbert of Gilbert and Sullivan.

McIntosh graduated from Lafayette College in 1884, where he was an athlete and became a member of the Sigma Chi fraternity.

He began as a stage actor and then moved into silent films. His most enduring role was Squire Bartlett, who banished the character played by Lillian Gish from his home and into the cold Maine winter in D.W. Griffith's classic film, Way Down East (1920). Miss Gish described McIntosh as a gentle giant, "always apologizing for having to treat me so cruelly". He appeared in 53 films between 1914 and 1934.

He died in Hollywood on April 28, 1942, aged 79, from a heart attack.

== The Burr McIntosh Monthly ==
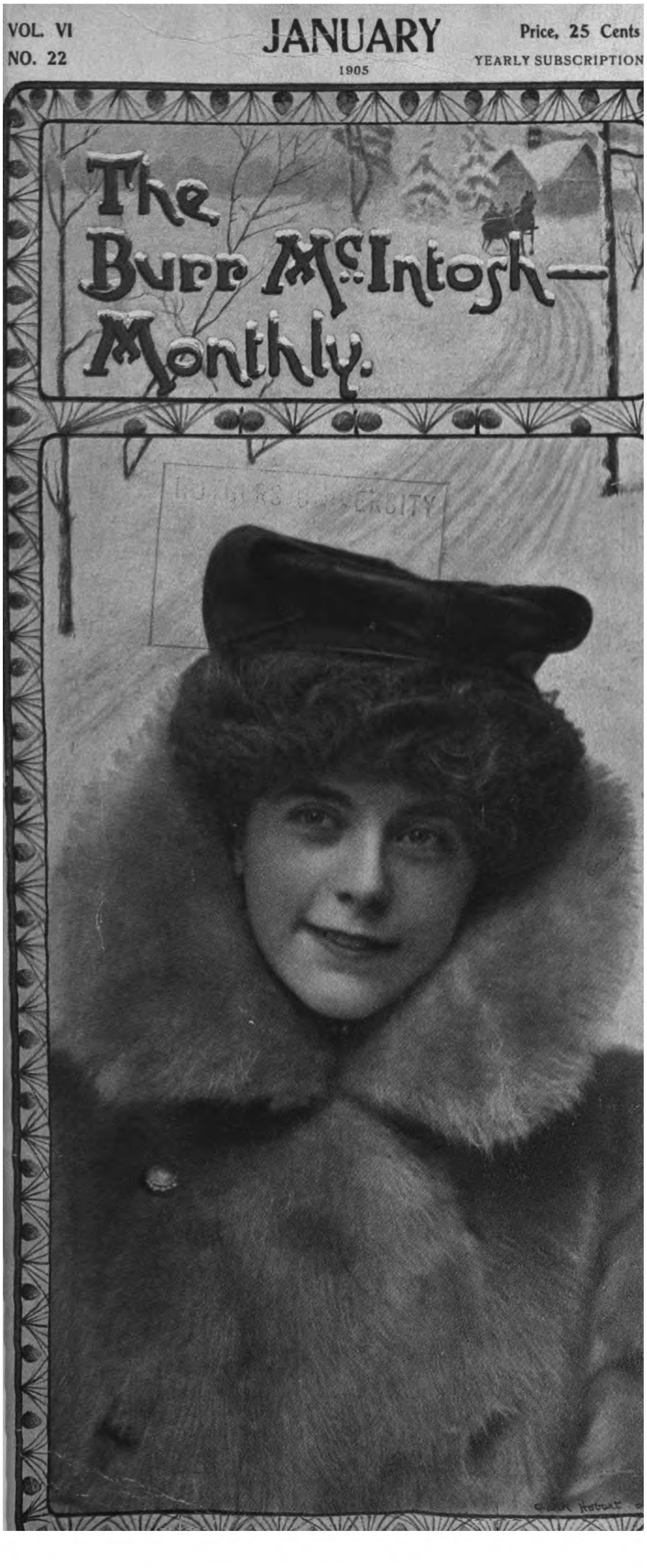
Cover of Burr McIntosh Monthly vol. 6, no. 22 (January 1905)

The Burr McIntosh Monthly was a monthly magazine started by Burr McIntosh which lasted from 1903–1910. It consisted mainly of photographs of famous people and landscapes, and was bound by string so as to encourage framing of the photographs. It was published and edited by Burr McIntosh, with Clark Hobart as art director.

== Selected filmography ==
- The New Adventures of J. Rufus Wallingford (1915)
- Way Down East (1920)
- The Exciters (1923)
- On the Banks of the Wabash (1923)
- Restless Wives (1924)
- Virtuous Liars (1924)
- The Spitfire (1924)
- The Average Woman (1924)
- Lend Me Your Husband (1924)
- Camille of the Barbary Coast (1925)
- Enemies of Youth (1925)
- The Green Archer (1925)
- The Wilderness Woman (1926)
- The Buckaroo Kid (1926)
- Lightning Reporter (1926)
- The Golden Stallion (1927)
- See You in Jail (1927)
- Fire and Steel (1927)
- Breakfast at Sunrise (1927)
- A Hero for a Night (1927)
- Hazardous Valley (1927)
- Once and Forever (1927)
- Framed (1927)
- Taxi! Taxi! (1927)
- The Fourflusher (1928)
- Sailors' Wives (1928)
- The Grip of the Yukon (1928)
- Lilac Time (1928)
- The Adorable Cheat (1928)
- Fancy Baggage (1929)
- Skinner Steps Out (1929)
- The Rogue Song (1930)
- A Private Scandal (1931)
- Command Performance (1931)
- The Richest Girl in the World (1934)
