= Christopher S. Wren =

American journalist and author (1936–2026)

Christopher Sale Wren (February 22, 1936 – February 15, 2026) was an American journalist and author. For 28 years he was a foreign correspondent for The New York Times.

== Early life and education ==
Wren was born in Hollywood, California, on February 22, 1936. His father was the actor Sam Wren and his mother was the actress Virginia Sale. In 1949, when Wren and his twin sister Virginia were young adults, they appeared in the ABC-TV television program, The Wren’s Nest, a comedy set in New York City which starred their parents.

In 1953, Wren graduated from Trinity-Pawling School. In 1957, he graduated from Dartmouth with a BA in English. He received a Rotary fellowship to do graduate work in Russian at the University of Edinburgh. After college, he joined the United States Army and trained as a paratrooper with the Green Berets. In 1961, he received a master's degree from the Columbia School of Journalism.

== Career ==
In 1961, Wren joined Look. He traveled to Vietnam several times to cover the war and went to Greece to report on the military junta that took over the country in 1967. He worked at the magazine until its closure in 1971.

In 1973, Wren joined The New York Times as a metropolitan reporter. In 1974, he became The Times bureau chief in Moscow. In 1977, he became bureau chief in Cairo until 1980, then moved to the position in Beijing until 1984, and finally in Johannesburg from 1988 to 1992.

Wren retired from The Times in 2001. The week after his retirement, he hiked 400 miles alone from Times Square to his retirement home in central Vermont, partly using the Appalachian Trail. In 2004, he published a book about the journey.

== Death ==
Wren died at his home in Thetford, Vermont, on February 15, 2026, at the age of 89.

== Awards and honors ==
In 1970, Wren won the George Polk Award of the Overseas Press Club for "Magazine reporting From Abroad" for the story "Greece: Government by Torture" published in Look Magazine.

== Books ==
- Those Turbulent Sons of Freedom: Ethan Allen’s Green Mountain Boys and the American (Simon & Schuster, 2018)
- Walking to Vermont: From Times Square into the Green Mountains -- a Homeward Adventure (Simon & Schuster, 2004)
- The Cat Who Covered the World: The Adventures of Henrietta and Her Foreign Correspondent (Simon & Schuster, 2000)
- Hacks (Simon & Schuster, 1996)
- The End of the Line: The Failure of Communism in the Soviet Union and China (Simon & Schuster, 1990)
- Winners Got Scars Too: The Life and Legends of Johnny Cash (1973)
- The Super Summer of Jamie McBride (Simon & Schuster, 1970)
