= Embarrassing Moments (1930 film) =

1930 film

- Directed by: William James Craft
- Screenplay by: Albert DeMond; Gladys Lehman; Earle Snell
- Story by: Earle Snell
- Produced by: Carl Laemmle
- Starring: Reginald Denny; Merna Kennedy; Otis Harlan; Greta Granstedt; Virginia Sale; William Austin
- Cinematography: Arthur L. Todd
- Edited by: W. Duncan Mansfield
- Production company: Universal Pictures
- Distributed by: Universal Pictures
- Release date: June 1930
- Running time: 58 minutes
- Country: United States
- Language: English

Embarrassing Moments is a 1930 American pre-Code comedy film directed by William James Craft and written by Albert DeMond, Gladys Lehman and Earle Snell. The film stars Reginald Denny, Merna Kennedy, Otis Harlan, Greta Granstedt, Virginia Sale and William Austin. The film was released in June 1930 by Universal Pictures.

== Cast ==
- Reginald Denny as Thaddeus Cruikshank
- Merna Kennedy as Marion Fuller
- Otis Harlan as Adam Fuller
- Greta Granstedt as Betty Black
- Virginia Sale as Aunt Prudence
- William Austin as Jasper Hickson
- Mary Foy as Mrs. Hickson
