= Publicity Madness =

1927 film directed by Albert Ray

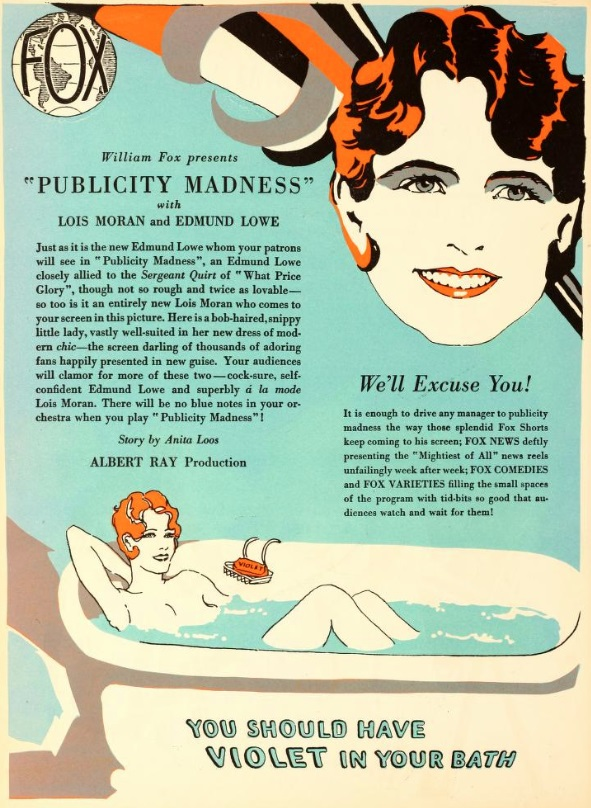
- Advertisement
- Directed by: Albert Ray
- Screenplay by: Andrew Bennison; Malcolm Stuart Boylan
- Story by: Anita Loos
- Produced by: William Fox
- Starring: Lois Moran; Edmund Lowe; E. J. Ratcliffe; James Gordon; Arthur Housman; Byron Munson
- Cinematography: Sidney Wagner
- Production company: Fox Film Corporation
- Distributed by: Fox Film Corporation
- Release date: October 2, 1927
- Running time: 60 minutes
- Country: United States
- Language: English

Publicity Madness is a lost 1927 American comedy film directed by Albert Ray and written by Andrew Bennison and Malcolm Stuart Boylan. The film stars Lois Moran, Edmund Lowe, E. J. Ratcliffe, James Gordon, Arthur Housman and Byron Munson. The film was released on October 2, 1927, by Fox Film Corporation, in a rush to capitalize on the publicity surrounding transatlantic flight of Charles Lindbergh.

== Plot ==
Pete Clark, advertising and publicity manager for the Henly soap manufacturing company, puts up $100,000 of the company's money for a promotional contest, but endangers his job, in the process.

Believing that no one would be so foolhardy as to compete for a prize involving a nonstop flight from the Pacific Coast to Hawaii, when Charles Lindbergh makes headlines crossing the Atlantic, Pete realizes the flight across the Pacific is possible. After taking a "crash" cours eon aviation, Pete decides to enter the race himself so as to collect the prize money and save himself from disgrace.

After a series of amazing stunts, Pete does reach Hawaii and thereby wins the admiration of Violet, the boss's daughter. He also saves his job.

== Cast ==
- Lois Moran as Violet Henly
- Edmund Lowe as Pete Clark
- E. J. Ratcliffe as Uncle Elmer Henly
- James Gordon as Brutus Banning
- Arthur Housman as Oscar Hawks
- Byron Munson as Henry Banning
- Norman Peck as Wilbur

== Production ==
Aviation historian Michael Paris in From the Wright Brothers to Top Gun: Aviation, Nationalism, and Popular Cinema(1995) described the frenzy of trying to woo Lindbergh to do a film. Hollywood resorted to a spate of aviation-related features including Publicity Madness (1927), Flying Romeos (1928) and A Hero for a Night, even the Walt Disney Studios' Plane Crazy (1928), all comedy spoofs of the Lindbergh transatlantic flight. (Note: Lindbergh was right in refusing Hollywood entries as most of the proposals were "slapstick" comedies.)

== Reception ==
The contemporary film review of Publicity Madness in The New York Times, noted, "A typical strip of Hollywood's more respectable canned fun is now decorating the Hippodrome screen. It bears the title of 'Publicity Madness' and its principal ingredients are beauty, resourcefulness, impertinence and stupidity; these are mixed up with dashes of flying machines, a full-blown ocean and a special soap."

Aviation film historian Stephen Pendo, in Aviation in the Cinema (1985) noted Publicity Madness involved "high jinks" in the air.
