= Those Who Dance =

Those Who Dance may refer to:

- Those Who Dance (1930 film), an American pre-Code crime film
- Those Who Dance (1924 film), an American silent drama film
