= Lucille Ricksen =

American child actress (1910–1925)

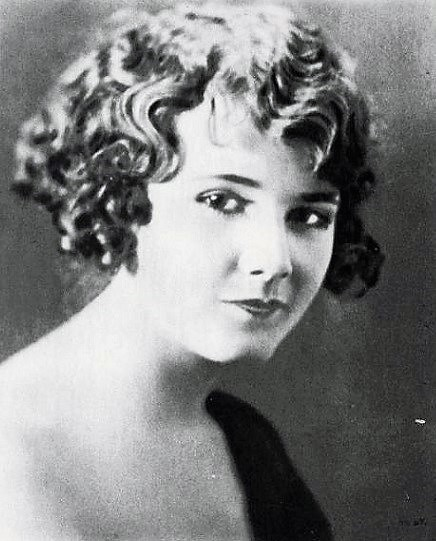
- Ricksen in 1924
- Born: Ingeborg Myrtle Elisabeth Ericksen; August 22, 1910; Chicago, Illinois, U.S.
- Died: March 13, 1925 (aged 14); Los Angeles, California, U.S.
- Resting place: Forest Lawn Memorial Park (Glendale)
- Other name: Lucille Rickson
- Occupations: Actress; model
- Years active: 1913–1923

Lucille Ricksen (born Ingeborg Myrtle Elisabeth Ericksen; August 22, 1910 – March 13, 1925) was an American motion picture actress during the silent film era. She died of tuberculosis on March 13, 1925, at the age of 14.

== Early life ==
Ingeborg Myrtle Elisabeth Ericksen was born in Chicago, Illinois on August 22, 1910. Her parents were Danish immigrants named Samuel and Ingeborg Nielsen Ericksen. Although Ricksen's birth year has been stated to be earlier, particularly as she often portrayed adult characters in films, her birth certificate states 1910 as her true birth year. She had an older brother, Marshall, who was born in 1907 in Chicago, who also appeared in early silent films. She became known as Lucille Ricksen.

== Edgar Pomeroy series ==
Ricksen began her career as a baby model, initially within poorly-paid modeling roles. Upon her parents' urging, she advanced to more professional child modeling and acting roles, adopting the pseudonym Lucille Ricksen at age four. (Note: This was a common theme for child actresses of this era, with other child actresses to adopt pseudonyms including Madge Evans, Helen Chandler and Kittens Reichert.) Through these modelling and acting roles, she and her brother rose to fame and provided a revenue for their parents as both children were committed to increasingly exhausting work schedules.

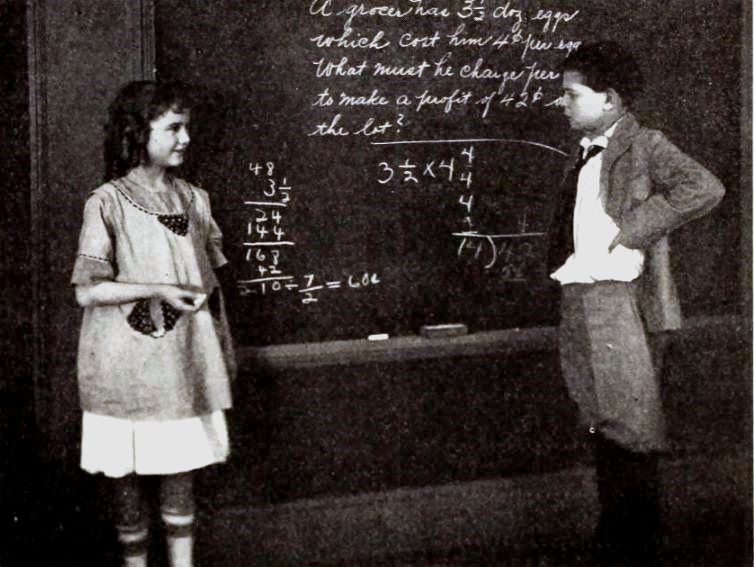
Still of Ricksen with Edward Peil Jr. from the short Edgar Takes the Cake (1920)

By the time Lucille was eight, her parents had divorced and her mother reportedly began to view the income from her daughter's acting career as a primary source of stability for her entire family. At the request of Samuel Goldwyn, Ingeborg relocated to Hollywood with her children in 1920. Shortly thereafter, Goldwyn cast the 11-year-old in a comedy serial entitled The Adventures of Edgar Pomeroy, and from this point on, Ricksen's acting and modeling commitments increased greatly, although at least outwardly, Ricksen enjoyed the fame and attention her career attracted. The serial shorts of The Adventures of Edgar Pomeroy ran in approximately 12 installments and were based on the stories of Booth Tarkington, with child actor Edward Peil Jr. taking the leading role of Edgar, and Ricksen the leading female role. In one review of her performances in this series, Ricksen was described as: "One of the most promising Hollywood actresses" and through this acting role, Ricksen formed close acquaintances with many notable directors, actors and actresses of the 1920s. She would also extensively tour the entire country, appearing in theaters and attending celebrity events, thus becoming one of the best known child actresses of the era.

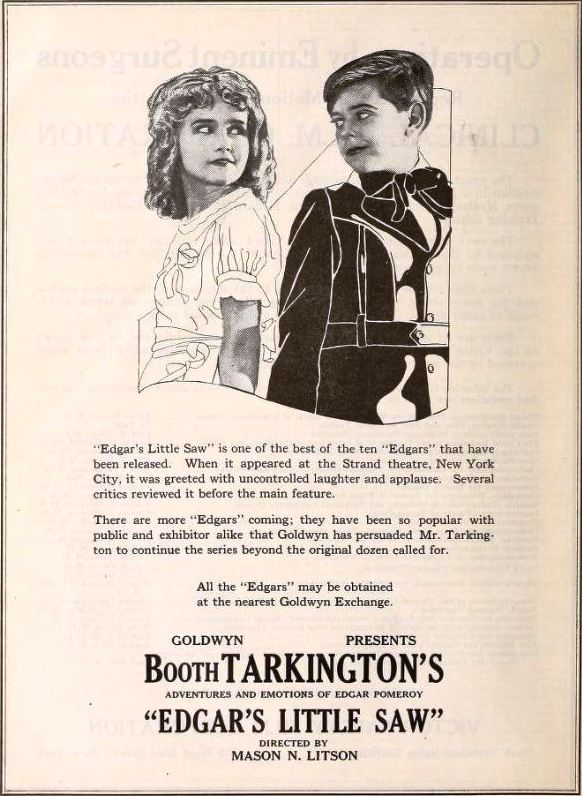
Ricksen, age 10, in promotion for the short Edgar's Little Saw (1920)

After leaving the Edgar Pomeroy serials, Ricksen appeared in more than 12 films between 1920 and 1921 alone. She was next cast in the 1922 Stuart Paton directed comedy The Married Flapper opposite Marie Prevost and Kenneth Harlan and the 13-year-old's career opportunities began to improve dramatically. In 1922, Ricksen was signed to a contract with actor and director Marshall Neilan, who cast her in the commercially and critically successful Neilan-directed drama The Stranger's Banquet in which she was cast alongside both Claire Windsor and Hobart Bosworth.

=== Progression of career ===
Beginning with the development of her career via the Edgar series, Ricksen took great care to preserve records of the early years of her career and her experiences in the silent films in which she starred. She is known to have preserved flyers and posters documenting her career, and to have cut and pasted newspaper clippings relating to any works in which she held a role into a journal. Beneath each cutting or photograph, she would write her personal sentiments as to her feelings relating to her progressing career.

Throughout the early 1920s, Ricksen appeared in a number of high-profile acting roles, although in many instances, she had to portray a character much older than her years. Her first assigned role as the leading female actress in a major film was in the 1923 movie The Rendezvous; a World War I satire in which she was cast as a deaf Russian peasant girl named Vera. Another notable performance Ricksen undertook in 1923 was her role as Ginger in the John Griffith Wray directed drama Human Wreckage: a drug prevention film produced by and starring actress Dorothy Davenport. (This film was made in reaction to the death of Davenport's husband, actor Wallace Reid, as a result of his morphine addiction).

Initially, her true age was accurately reported in the press, with one typical editorial, the Covington Republic, appraising her in February 1923 as being "The youngest leading lady on the screen".

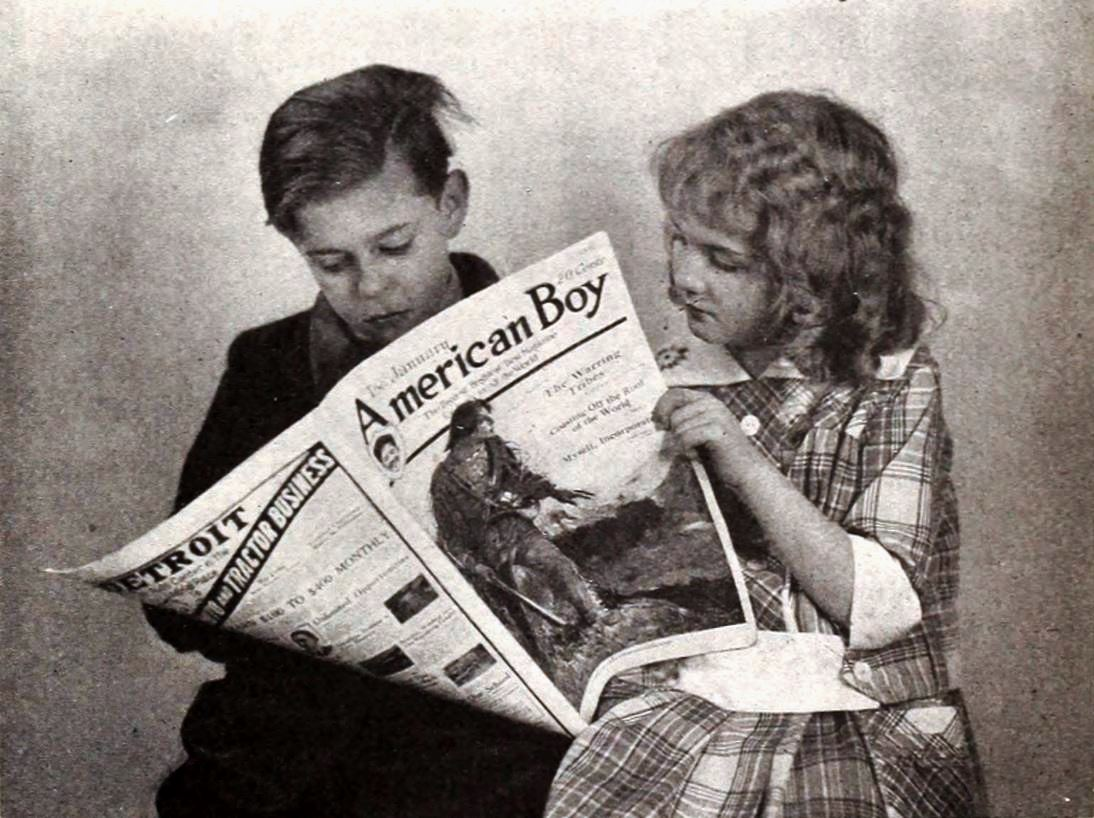
Edward Peil, Jr. with Ricksen, February 1920

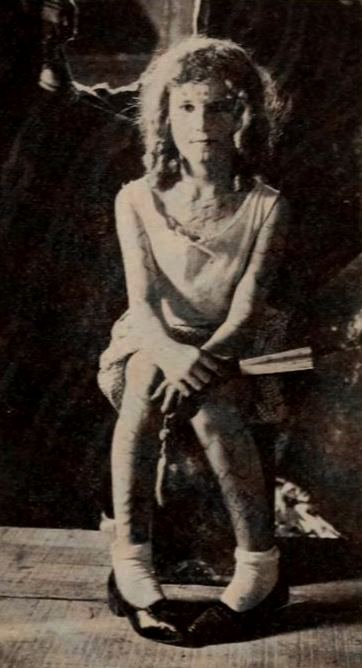
Still of Ricksen from the short Edgar Camps Out (1920)

From 1920 to 1925, Ricksen starred opposite some of the most popular actors of the silent era, including Conrad Nagel, James Kirkwood, Sr., Jack Pickford, Louise Fazenda, Laura La Plante, Anna Q. Nilsson, Blanche Sweet, Bessie Love, Cullen Landis and Patsy Ruth Miller, although the number of contracts and thus the required hours to be devoted to her career increased dramatically, with Ricksen completing no fewer than 10 films within a seven-month period within 1924 alone, often portraying characters who were much older than she was.

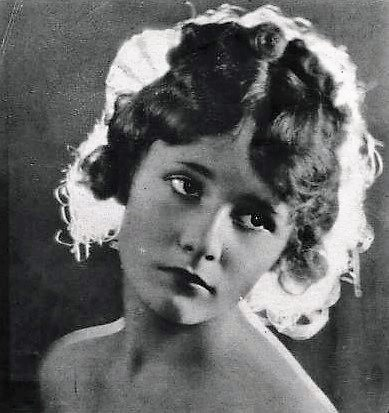
Ricksen in 1921

In 1924, at age 14, Ricksen was named one of the WAMPAS Baby Stars; a promotional campaign sponsored by the Western Association of Motion Picture Advertisers in the United States, which honored thirteen young women each year who they believed to be on the threshold of movie stardom. Other actresses named that year included Dorothy Mackaill and Clara Bow.

== Death ==
While filming the Del Andrews directed comedy The Galloping Fish in 1924 opposite Sydney Chaplin and Louise Fazenda (in which she portrayed the role of the wife of the lead character), Ricksen became ill. She had appeared in prominent roles in 10 films that year, including the popular drama The Painted Lady opposite George O'Brien and Dorothy Mackaill. However, by early 1925, her condition had worsened and she was diagnosed as having tuberculosis. During her illness, her father disappeared. Ricksen's last screen appearance was opposite Claire Windsor and William Haines in the drama The Denial, filmed in 1924 and released in early 1925.

Ricksen was bedridden for the last few months of her life, and her distraught mother Ingeborg maintained a bedside vigil over her daughter, insisting that both the press and all contacts Ricksen had made throughout her filming career cease until she had recovered. Nonetheless, Ricksen was visited on a weekly basis by film director and screenwriter Paul Bern, who brought her flowers and would read magazines to her while he held her hand.

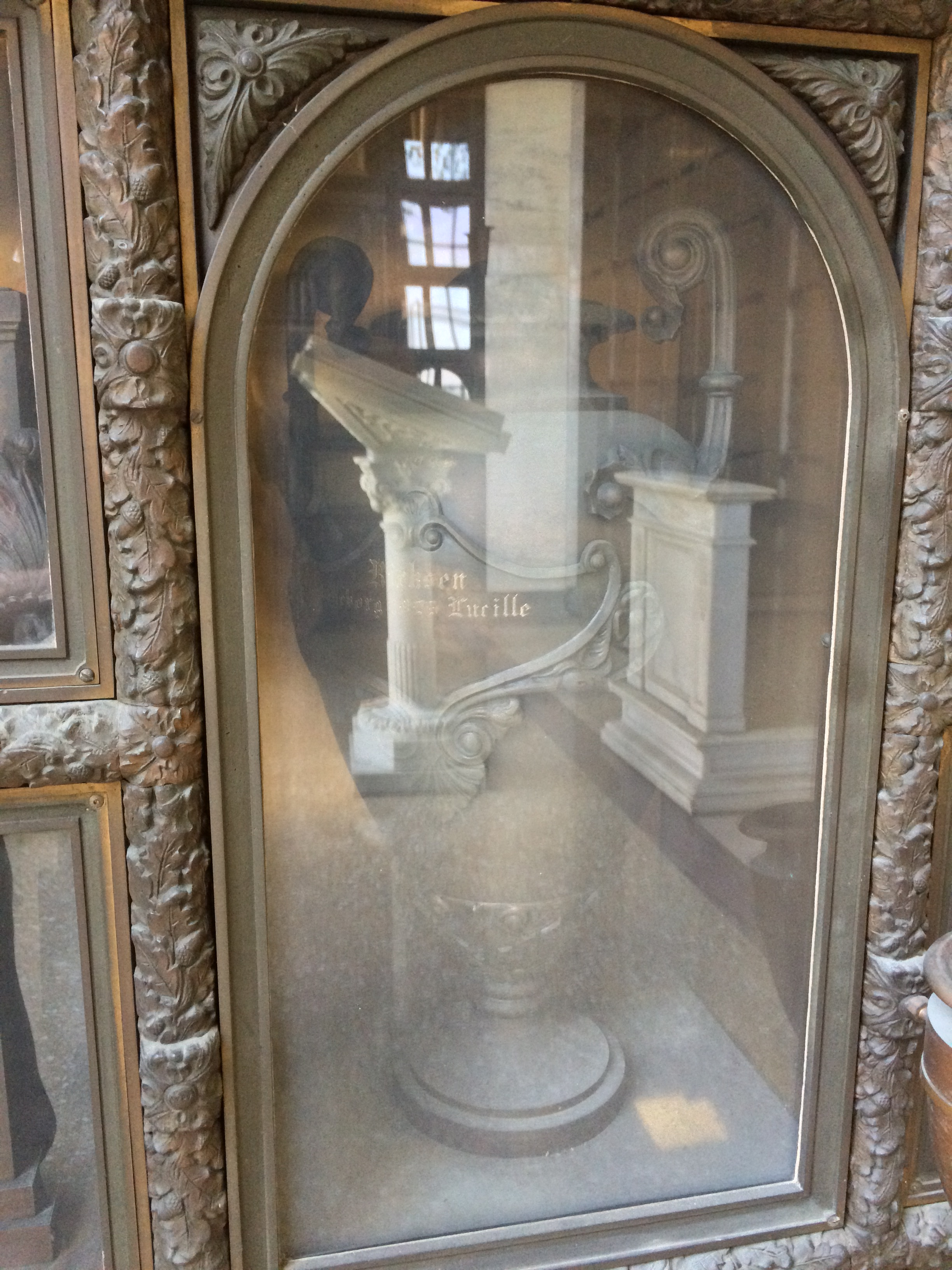
Ricksen's niche in the Great Mausoleum, Forest Lawn Memorial Park, Glendale

In late February 1925, Ingeborg succumbed to a fatal heart attack and collapsed on top of her bedridden daughter. After her mother's death, Ricksen was tended by others in the movie colony, including Paul Bern and actress Lois Wilson. She died just two weeks after her mother, on March 13, 1925, at age 14.

== Posthumous ==
After Ricksen's death, the media extensively reported that her illness had been created through a combination of malnutrition and exhaustion due to her working almost non-stop for twelve years, largely under poor conditions and at the insistence of both her mother and her agents. The Ricksen family doctor would support this prognosis prior to her death, stating: "She crowded too much work into too short a time, and overtaxed her capacities. Other youthful stars have done the same thing. The result is that she has had a complete physical and nervous collapse ...so complete that she has not rallied from it as she should." Ricksen's death was cited as an example for parents not to exploit their children to showcase their talent.

A photo article of Ricksen is featured in the 2011 film The Artist. In the film, she is listed as a newcomer in 1929, four years after she had died in real life.

After her death, Ricksen's estate and savings were divided amongst relatives and coworkers. Her father, Samuel Ericksen, received 1/4 of her life insurance and became the administrator of her estate. Rupert Hughes and Conrad Nagel were awarded the remaining amount "for the benefit of Marshall Ericksen, brother of the deceased." The two were named as his guardians.

== Filmography ==
Year	Title	Role	Notes
1920	Edgar and the Teacher's Pet		Short film Lost film
1920	Edgar's Hamlet		Short film
1920	Edgar's Jonah Day		Short film Lost film
1920	Edgar Takes the Cake		Short film Lost film
1920	Edgar's Sunday Courtship		Short film Lost film
1920	Edgar Camps Out		Short film Lost film
1920	Edgar's Little Saw		Short film Lost film
1920	Edgar, the Explorer		Short film Lost film
1921	Edgar's Country Cousin		Short film Lost film
1921	Edgar's Feast Day		Short film Lost film
1921	Edgar, the Detective		Short film Lost film
1921	The Old Nest	Kate at 9	
1922	The Married Flapper	Carolyn Carter	Lost film
1922	Remembrance	Child	Lost film
1922	The Girl Who Ran Wild	Clytie	Lost film
1922	Forsaking All Others	May Wharton	Lost film
1922	The Strangers' Banquet	Flapper	Lost film
1923	The Social Buccaneer	Lucille Vail	Lost film
1923	One of Three		Lost film Short film
1923	Under Secret Orders		Lost film Short film
1923	Trimmed in Scarlet	Faith Ebbing	Lost film Credited as Lucille Rickson
1923	The Secret Code		Lost film Short film
1923	The Radio-Active Bomb		Lost film Short film
1923	The Showdown		Lost film Short film
1923	Human Wreckage	Ginger	Lost film
1923	The Rendezvous	Vera	
1924	Judgment of the Storm	Mary Heath	
1924	The Galloping Fish	Hyla Wetherill	
1924	The Hill Billy	Emmy Lou Spence	Lost film
1924	Those Who Dance	Ninon	Lost film
1924	Young Ideas	Eloise Lowden	
1924	Behind the Curtain	Sylvia Bailey	
1924	Vanity's Price	Sylvia, Teddy's fiancee	Alternative title: This House of Vanity; Lost film
1924	The Painted Lady	Alice Smith	Lost film
1924	Idle Tongues	Faith Copeland	Lost film
1925	The Denial	The daughter	Incomplete film

== See also ==
- Lost films
- Silent films
