= The Married Flapper =

1922 film directed by Stuart Paton

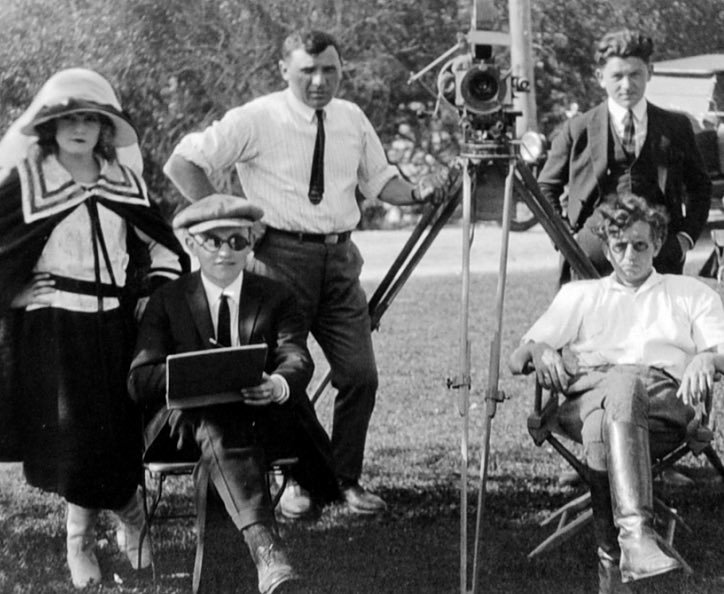
- Lucille Ricksen, director Stuart Paton, and film crew
- Directed by: Stuart Paton
- Screenplay by: Doris Schroeder
- Story by: Bernard H. Hyman
- Starring: Marie Prevost; Kenneth Harlan; Philo McCullough; Frank Kingsley; Lucille Ricksen; Kathleen O'Connor
- Cinematography: Jackson Rose
- Production company: Universal Film Manufacturing Company
- Distributed by: Universal Film Manufacturing Company
- Release date: July 31, 1922
- Running time: 50 minutes
- Country: United States
- Language: Silent (English intertitles)

The Married Flapper is a 1922 American comedy film directed by Stuart Paton and written by Doris Schroeder. The film stars Marie Prevost, Kenneth Harlan, Philo McCullough, Frank Kingsley, Lucille Ricksen, and Kathleen O'Connor. The film was released on July 31, 1922, by Universal Film Manufacturing Company.

== Cast ==
- Marie Prevost as Pamela Billings
- Kenneth Harlan as Bill Billings
- Philo McCullough as Glenn Kingdonn
- Frank Kingsley as Oliver Holbrook
- Lucille Ricksen as Carolyn Carter
- Kathleen O'Connor as Gwen Barker
- Hazel Keener as Muriel Vane
- Tom McGuire as John Holbrook
- Burton S. Wilson as Robert Mills
- William Quinn as 'Wild Ben' Clark
- Lydia Yeamans Titus as Mrs. Brewer
- Martha Mattox as Aunt Libby
