= Human Wreckage =

1923 film

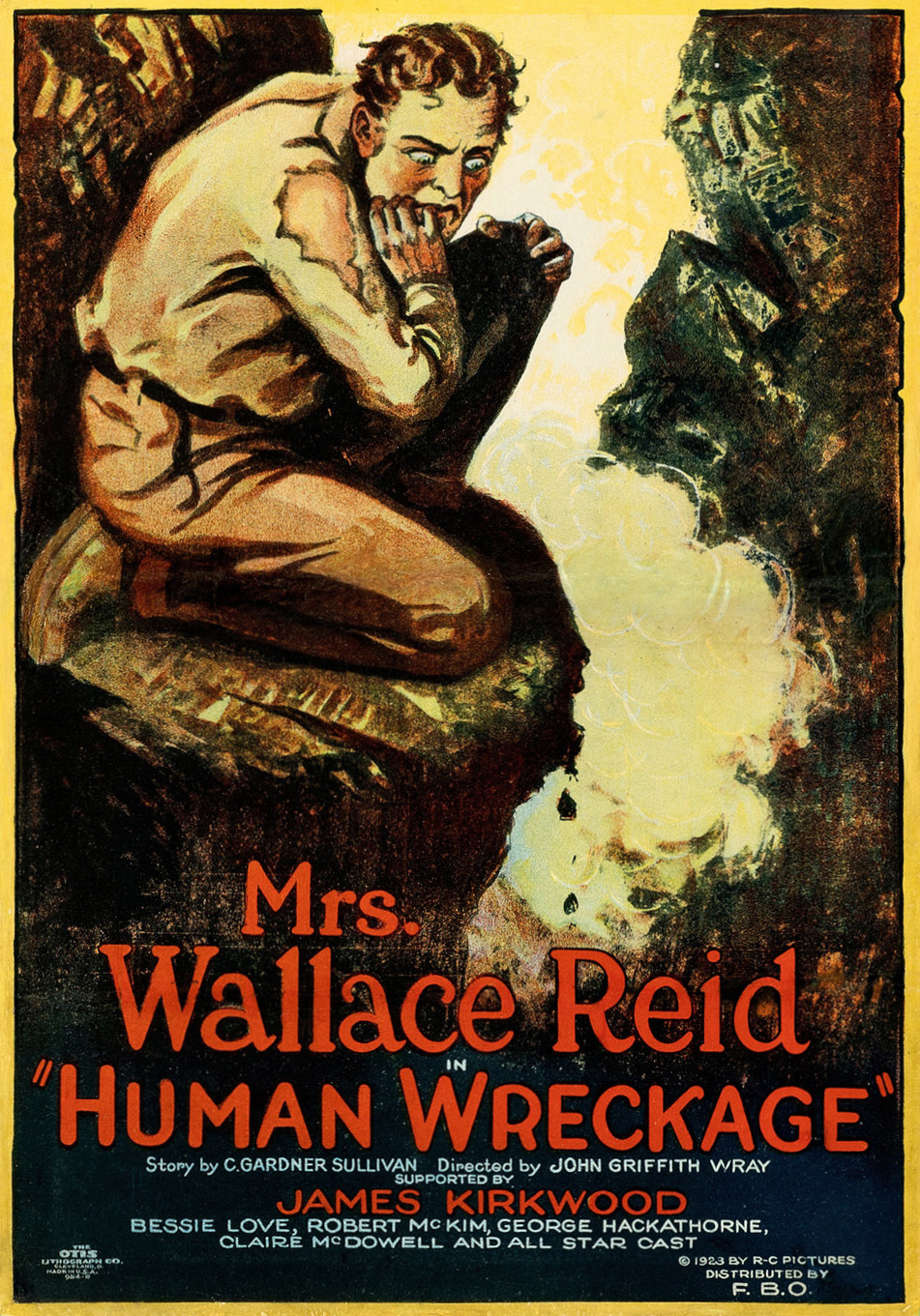
- 1923 lobby poster
- Directed by: John Griffith Wray
- Written by: C. Gardner Sullivan; Dorothy Davenport (uncredited)
- Story by: Will Lambert
- Produced by: Dorothy Davenport; Thomas Ince
- Starring: Dorothy Davenport; Bessie Love; James Kirkwood, Sr.
- Cinematography: Henry Sharp
- Distributed by: Film Booking Offices of America
- Release date: June 17, 1923 (U.S.)
- Running time: 80 minutes
- Country: United States
- Language: Silent (English intertitles)

Human Wreckage is a 1923 American independent silent drama propaganda film that starred Dorothy Davenport and featured James Kirkwood, Sr., Bessie Love, and Lucille Ricksen. The film was co-produced by Davenport and Thomas H. Ince and distributed by Film Booking Offices of America, with a premiere on June 17, 1923. No print of this film is known to exist today, and it is considered a lost film.

Davenport's husband Wallace Reid was addicted to morphine, which had been prescribed to him after an injury. The film portrayed the dangers of drug addiction and was shown across the country by Davenport herself, billed as Mrs. Wallace Reid, in an early example of what would later be called a roadshow engagement.

== Plot ==
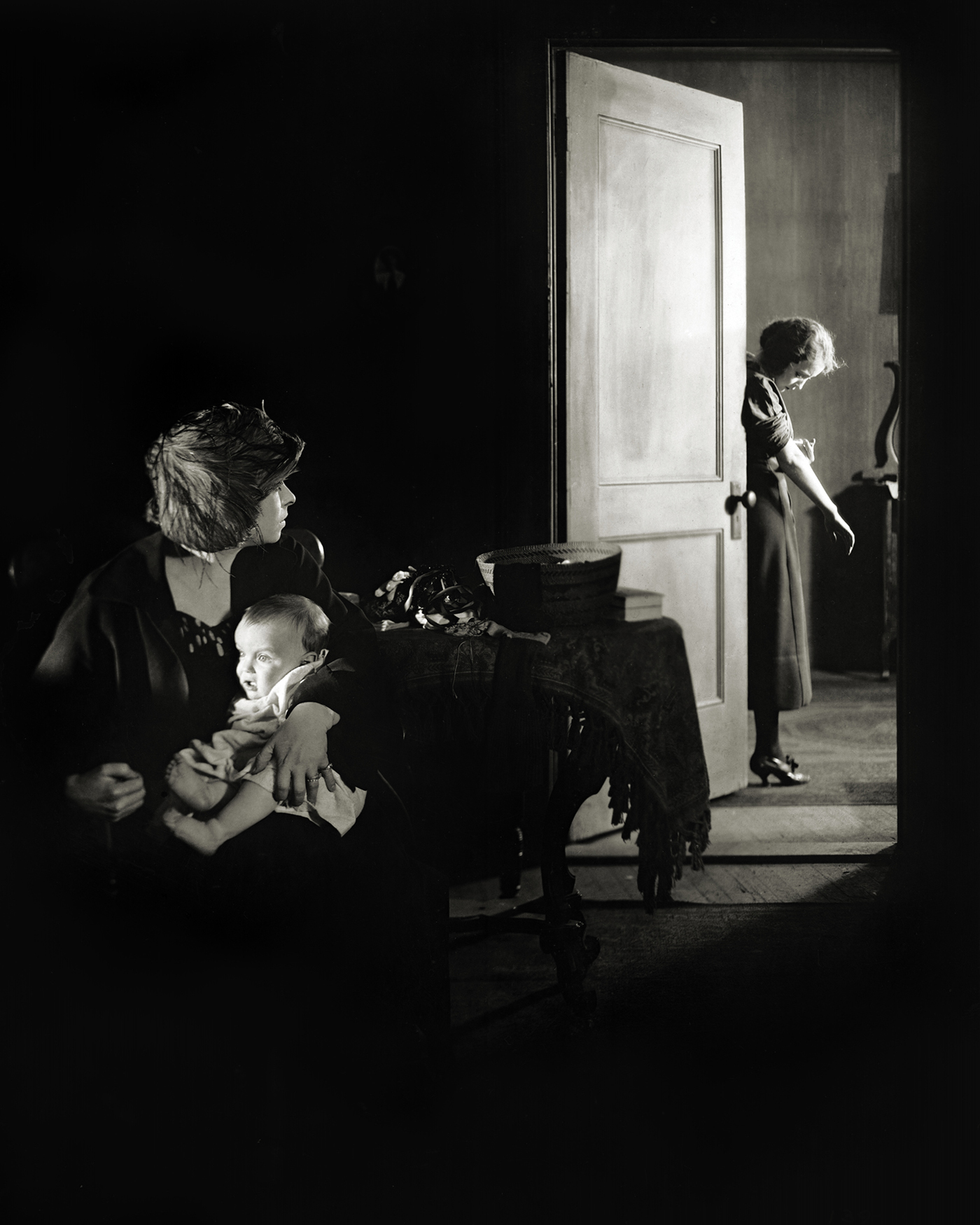
Bessie Love injects herself with morphine while Dorothy Davenport cares for her infant.

Ethel McFarland (Davenport) presents her attorney husband, Alan (Kirkwood), with the case of a dope addict named Jimmy Brown (Hackathorne). With the help of Alan's impassioned defense, Jimmy gets acquitted.

Alan feels the pressures of his job and is introduced to a doctor at his club. When he becomes addicted, he is blackmailed by his peddlers to represent their friends in court. Jimmy, now off the smack and a taxi driver, hears of these goings-on. When he discovers that his passenger is the leader of the dope ring, he resolves to aid the war on narcotics by crashing the vehicle head-on into an oncoming train, killing them both. Alan gets treated for his addiction and begins to fight the pushers in court, all the while pushing for stronger laws against addictive substances.

At the film's close, Davenport addresses the audience directly, imploring them to support her in her crusade to wipe out the menace of narcotics.

== Cast ==
- Dorothy Davenport as Ethel MacFarland (billed as Mrs. Wallace Reid)
- James Kirkwood as Alan MacFarland
- Bessie Love as Mary Finnegan
- George Hackathorne as Jimmy Brown
- Claire McDowell as Mrs. Brown
- Robert McKim as Dr. Hillman
- Harry Northrup as Steve Stone
- Victory Bateman as Mother Finnegan
- Eric Mayne as Dr. Blake
- Otto Hoffman as Harris
- Philip Sleeman as Dunn
- George Clark as The Baby
- Lucille Ricksen as Ginger
- George E. Cryer as mayor of Los Angeles
- Doctor Rufus B. von KleinSmid as president of University of Southern California
- Benjamin Bledsoe as U.S. judge, 12th Federal District
- Louis D. Oaks as Los Angeles chief of police
- Martha Nelson McCan as Los Angeles parks commissioner
- Mrs. Chester Ashley as a civic leader
- John P. Carter as a former Internal Revenue Service collector
- Mrs. Charles F. Gray as a civic leader (Congress of Mothers and Parent-Teacher Associations)
- Doctor L. M. Powers as Los Angeles health commissioner
- Brigadier C. R. Boyd as a Salvation Army leader

== Censorship ==
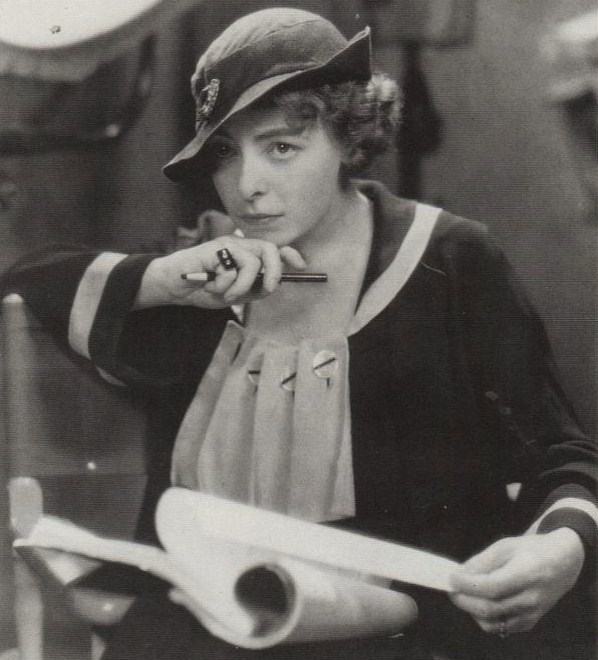
Davenport on the film set

Wallace Reid died on January 18, 1923, during the first year of existence of the Motion Picture Producers and Distributors of America, which was led by Will H. Hays and which set standards for films to be approved for showing in theaters. Although it took years for the so-called "Hays Code" to be finalized, the Code did set certain standards for movies from the very beginning, including a ban on any reference to drug use. Despite this, Davenport received a dispensation from Hays allowing her to produce Human Wreckage because of its anti-drug message.

The film was banned by the British Board of Film Censors in 1924.

== Legacy ==
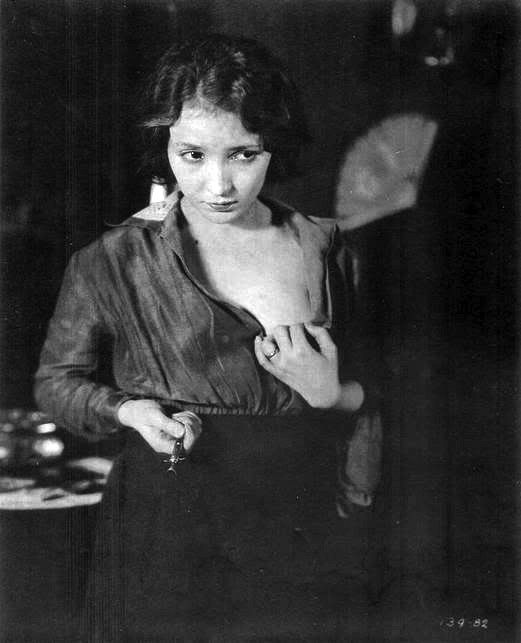
Love in the photograph that inspired later artworks

A promotional photograph of Bessie Love in the film inspired artworks by Nina Mae Fowler (Bessie, 2010) and Dave McKean (Human Wreckage, 2023).

== See also ==
- List of lost films
