= The Strangers' Banquet =

1922 film

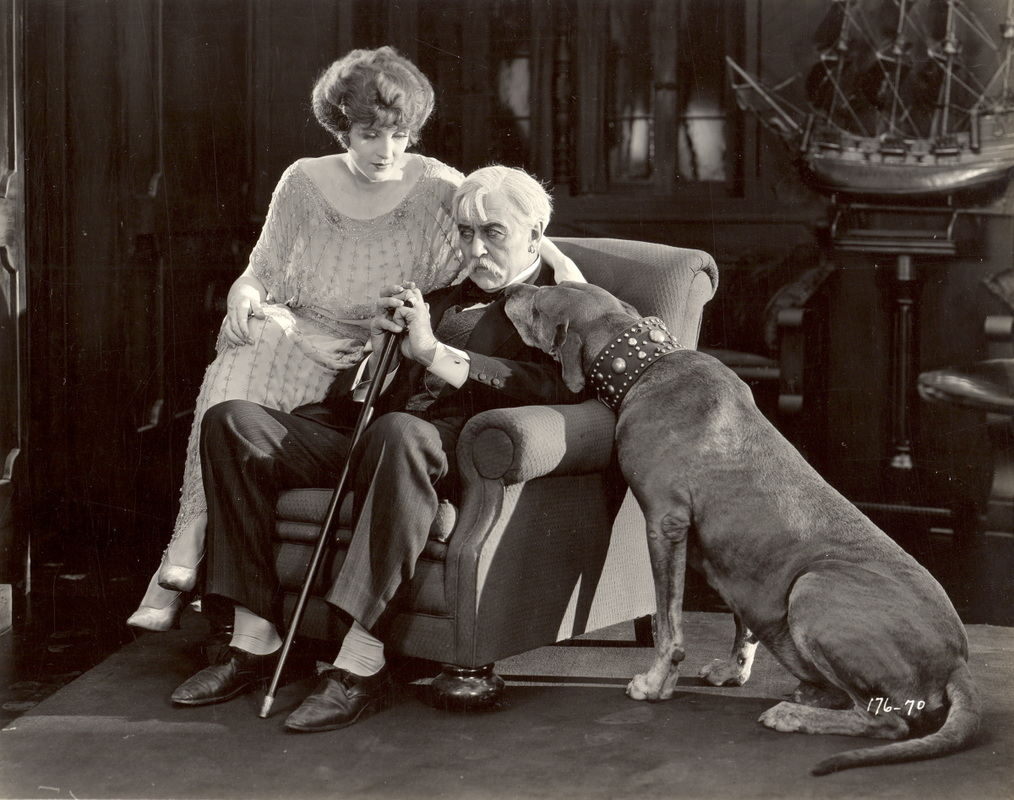
- Claire Windsor, Hobart Bosworth, and Teddy
- Directed by: Marshall Neilan
- Written by: Marshall Neilan; Frank Urson
- Based on: The Strangers' Banquet by Brian Oswald Donn-Byrne
- Produced by: Marshall Neilan
- Starring: Hobart Bosworth; Claire Windsor; Rockliffe Fellowes
- Cinematography: Max Fabian; David Kesson
- Production company: Marshall Neilan Productions
- Distributed by: Goldwyn Pictures
- Release date: December 31, 1922
- Running time: 80 minutes
- Country: United States
- Language: Silent (English intertitles)

The Strangers' Banquet is a 1922 American silent drama film directed by Marshall Neilan and starring Hobart Bosworth, Claire Windsor, and Rockliffe Fellowes. It is based on the 1919 novel of the same title by Brian Oswald Donn-Byrne. Locations shooting for the film was done at the shipyards at San Pedro, CA.

== Plot ==
In managing the shipyard inherited from her father, Derith Keogh has considerable labor problems and accedes to the unreasonable demands of John Trevelyan, an anarchist labor agitator. Derith's brother John is off in pursuit of an adventuress, and Angus Campbell, her superintendent, resigns in exasperation. Angus returns, however, to help Derith persuade Trevelyan to settle a strike, which Trevelyan accomplishes in spite of being shot by one of his own men.

== Cast ==
- Hobart Bosworth as Shane Keogh
- Claire Windsor as Derith
- Rockliffe Fellowes as Angus Campbell
- Ford Sterling as Al Norton
- Eleanor Boardman as Jean McPherson
- Thomas Holding as John Trevelyan
- Eugenie Besserer as Mrs. McPherson
- Nigel Barrie as John Keogh
- Stuart Holmes as Prince
- Claude Gillingwater as Uncle Sam
- Margaret Loomis as Bride
- Tom Guise as Bride's Father
- Lillian Langdon as Bride's Mother
- William Humphrey as Groom's Friend
- Edward McWade as Harriman
- Lorimer Johnston as Ross
- James A. Marcus as Braithwaite
- Edward W. Borman as Dolan
- Jack Curtis as McKinstry
- Brinsley Shaw as Krischenko
- Arthur Hoyt as Morel
- Aileen Pringle as Mrs. Schuyler-Peabody
- Virginia Ruggles as Olive Stockton
- Cyril Chadwick as Bond
- Philo McCullough as Britton
- Jean Hersholt as Fiend
- Lucille Ricksen as Flapper
- Dagmar Godowsky as Senorita
- Hayford Hobbs as Toreador
- Violet Joy as Cabaret Girl

== Preservation ==
The Stranger's Banquet is currently presumed lost. In February of 2021, the film was cited by the National Film Preservation Board on their Lost U.S. Silent Feature Films list.

== Bibliography ==
- Connelly, Robert B. The Silents: Silent Feature Films, 1910-36, Volume 40, Issue 2. December Press, 1998.
- Munden, Kenneth White. The American Film Institute Catalog of Motion Pictures Produced in the United States, Part 1. University of California Press, 1997.
