= Those Who Dance (1930 film) =

1930 film by William Beaudine

- Directed by: William Beaudine
- Screenplay by: Joseph Jackson
- Story by: George Kibbe Turner
- Produced by: Robert North
- Starring: Monte Blue; Lila Lee; Betty Compson
- Cinematography: Sid Hickox
- Edited by: George Amy
- Distributed by: Warner Bros. Pictures, Inc.
- Release date: April 19, 1930 (U.S.); (Limited release)
- Running time: 75 minutes
- Country: United States
- Language: English

Those Who Dance is a 1930 American Pre-Code crime film produced and distributed by Warner Bros. Pictures, directed by William Beaudine, and starring Monte Blue, Lila Lee, William "Stage" Boyd and Betty Compson. It is a remake of the 1924 silent film Those Who Dance starring Bessie Love and Blanche Sweet. The story, written by George Kibbe Turner, was based on events that occurred among gangsters in Chicago.

== Plot ==
A police detective is after a famous gangster. The detective disguises himself and lives incognito in the house of the gangster by pretending to be an out-of-town gangster who has just murdered someone. The detective pretends to be the sweetheart of a girl who suspects her brother has been framed for murder by Dan Hogan. Hogan's moll is also in on the conspiracy as she became fed up with his cheating, lying and mistreatment. The life of Brady's brother, who has been sentenced to death in the electric chair, depends on their getting evidence against Diamond Joe Jennings.

== Cast ==
- Lila Lee as Nora Brady
- Monte Blue as Dan Hogan
- William "Stage" Boyd as Diamond Joe Jennings
- Betty Compson as Kitty
- William Janney as Tim Brady
- Wilfred Lucas as Big Ben Benson
- Cornelius Keefe as Pat Hogan
- DeWitt Jennings as Captain O'Brien
- Gino Corrado as Tony
- Richard Cramer as Steve Daley
- Harry Semels as Hood
- Nick Thompson as Hood

The Silver Sheet, a studio publication promoting Thomas Ince Productions, April 1924

== Foreign-language versions ==
Foreign-language versions were made in Spanish (Los Que Danzan), German (The Dance Goes On or Der Tanz geht weiter), and French Counter Investigation (Contre-Enquête). They are all apparently lost.

== Pre-Code material ==
The film contains a lot of Pre-Code material. For example, Lila Lee's character is called "a professional virgin" and two unmarried couples live together. There is a reference to homosexuality where a man is vaguely called being "that way" about Tim Brady (played by William Janney), etc.

== Preservation ==
The complete film survives in 16 mm. It was remastered in this format by Associated Artists Productions in 1956 and included in a package of vintage feature films syndicated to television stations. A 16-mm print is housed at the Wisconsin Center for Film & Theater Research. Another print exists at the Library of Congress.
