= Young Ideas (1924 film) =

1924 film by Robert F. Hill

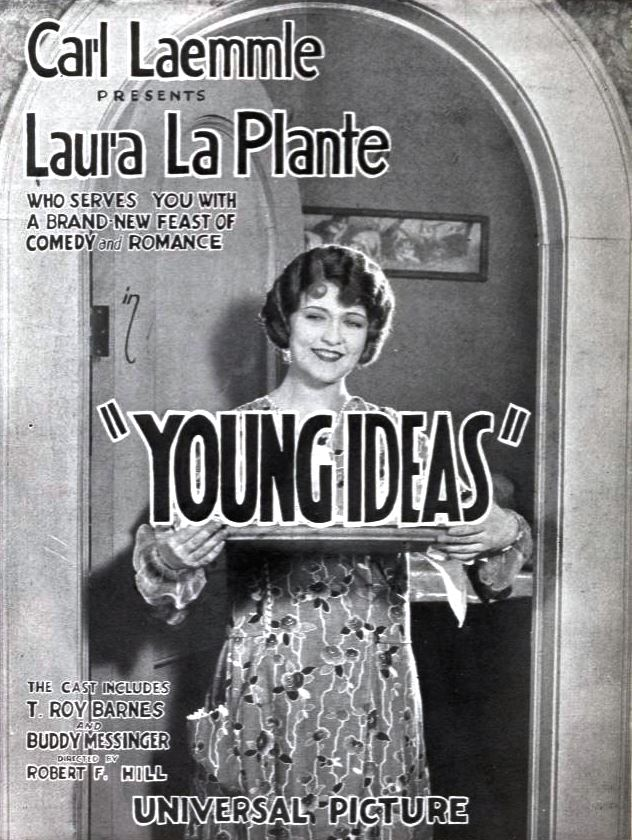
- Advertisement
- Directed by: Robert F. Hill
- Written by: Hugh Hoffman
- Based on: "Relative Values" by Sophie Kerr
- Produced by: Carl Laemmle
- Starring: Laura La Plante; T. Roy Barnes; Lucille Ricksen
- Cinematography: Jackson Rose
- Production company: Universal Pictures
- Distributed by: Universal Pictures
- Release date: July 7, 1924
- Running time: 50 minutes
- Country: United States
- Language: Silent (English intertitles)

Young Ideas is a 1924 American silent comedy film directed by Robert F. Hill and starring Laura La Plante, T. Roy Barnes, and Lucille Ricksen. It also featured an uncredited appearance of the future star Janet Gaynor.

== Plot ==
As described in a film magazine, Octavia Lowden is the mainstay of a family consisting of Aunt Minnie, firmly convinced that she is "not long for this world," Eloise, a younger sister with a twisted disposition, Uncle Eph, who fought with General Grant at Appomattox, Bob, a kid brother with a sleep-and-mischief complex, and Grandma, the only regular sport in the outfit, but tied to her chair. Octavia is a photographer in Pritchett Spence's gallery and much, but hopelessly admired by Spence. With a family of sick people Octavia cannot give Spence a moment's attention. Finally he ventures to her house one Sunday afternoon, with such results that he is driven to a desperate trick. To get her away from her bloodsucking relatives, he sends her on an out-of-town assignment and then has a doctor friend quarantine the house. Detectives keep Octavia and the other inmates of the house within, and of course Octavia worries over her fam- ily, all of them probably starving or dying. As a matter of fact, they are all — but Grandma — at work, facing a realization that they either work or starve. Meanwhile, Spence and Dr. Hiram Smith sit back and chuckle — until Grandma gets sick. Then Spence goes to the country place to bring Octavia home, and has to whip the very detectives he put around the house because they do not know him. But a skunk releases the "prisoners" and in a short time Octavia finds herself at home — and a strange home it is, with Bob in overalls and Eloise and Aunt Minnie in aprons. And then Spence seeks forgiveness for his "trick" and receives punishment extraordinary — a life sentence with Octavia.

== Cast ==
- Laura La Plante as Octavia Lowden
- T. Roy Barnes as Pritchett Spence
- Lucille Ricksen as Eloise Lowden
- James O. Barrows as Uncle Eph
- Lydia Yeamans Titus as Aunt Minnie
- Jennie Lee as Grandma
- Rolfe Sedan as Bertie Loomis
- Buddy Messinger as Bob Lowden
- Janet Gaynor

== Preservation ==
A print of Young Ideas is held at the EYE Film Institute Netherlands.

== Bibliography ==
- Goble, Alan. The Complete Index to Literary Sources in Film. Walter de Gruyter, 1999.
