= The Painted Lady (1924 film) =

1924 American drama film

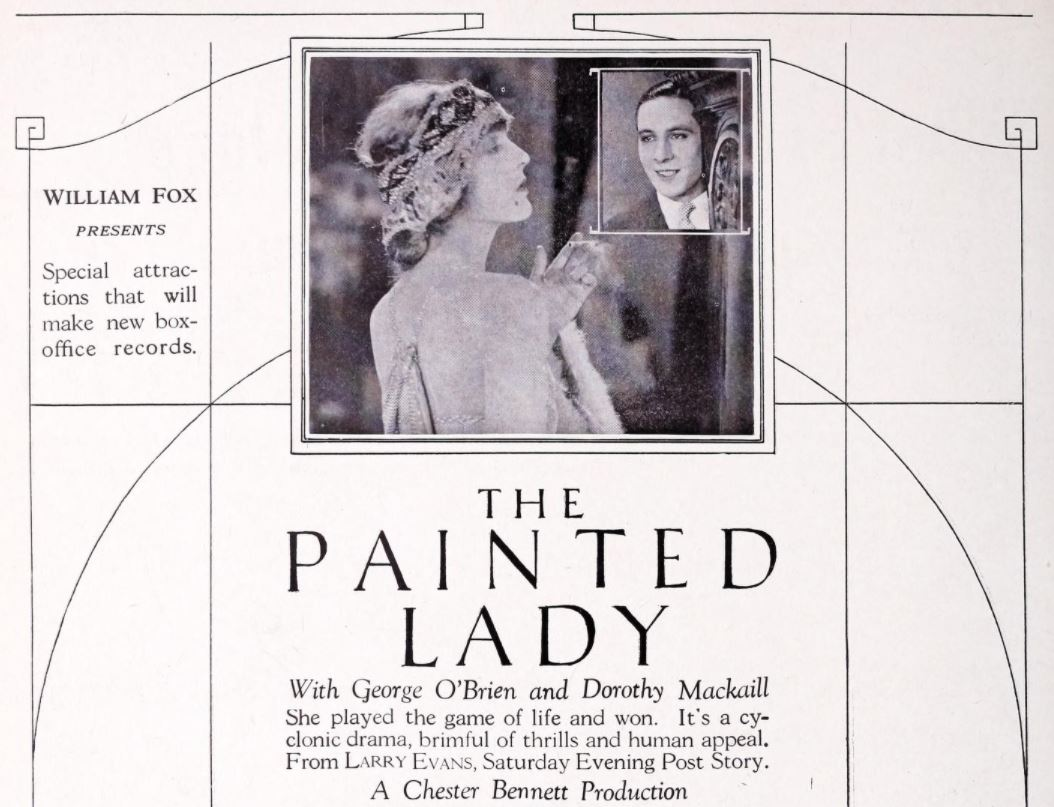
- Advertisement for film
- Directed by: Chester Bennett
- Screenplay by: Thomas Dixon Jr.
- Based on: The Painted Lady by Larry Evans
- Starring: George O'Brien; Dorothy Mackaill; Harry T. Morey; Lucille Hutton; Lucille Ricksen; Margaret McWade
- Cinematography: Alfred Gosden
- Production company: Fox Film Corporation
- Distributed by: Fox Film Corporation
- Release date: September 28, 1924
- Running time: 70 minutes
- Country: United States
- Language: Silent (English intertitles)

The Painted Lady is a 1924 American drama film directed by Chester Bennett and written by Thomas Dixon Jr. The film stars George O'Brien, Dorothy Mackaill, Harry T. Morey, Lucille Hutton, Lucille Ricksen, and Margaret McWade. The film was released on September 28, 1924, by Fox Film Corporation.

== Plot ==
As described in a film magazine, Violet (Mackaill) hurries to save her half-sister Pearl when she receives a message that Pearl with others is robbing a house. She is caught and sent to jail for three years while Pearl escapes. As a governess, she is hounded by the law until she becomes a "painted lady." She goes on a tour of the South Seas with wealthy Roger Lewis (Elliott). In a storm at sea, the yacht is destroyed. Violet is picked up by a vessel and finds love with Luther Smith (O'Brien) onboard, who saves her from the clutches of Captain Sutton (Morey).

== Cast ==
- George O'Brien as Luther Smith
- Dorothy Mackaill as Violet
- Harry T. Morey as Captain Sutton
- Lucille Hutton as Pearl Thompson
- Lucille Ricksen as Alice Smith
- Margaret McWade as Mrs. Smith
- John Miljan as Carter
- Frank Elliott as Roger Lewis
- Lucien Littlefield as Matt Logan

== Censorship concerns ==
The Motion Picture Producers and Distributors of America, formed by the film industry in 1922, regulated the content of films through a list of subjects that were to be avoided. While Dorothy Mackaill portrayed a prostitute in The Painted Lady, this was acceptable as prostitution was not explicitly barred so long as it was not forced (i.e., white slavery) and aspects of her work were not shown in the film.
