= The Galloping Fish =

1924 film by Del Andrews

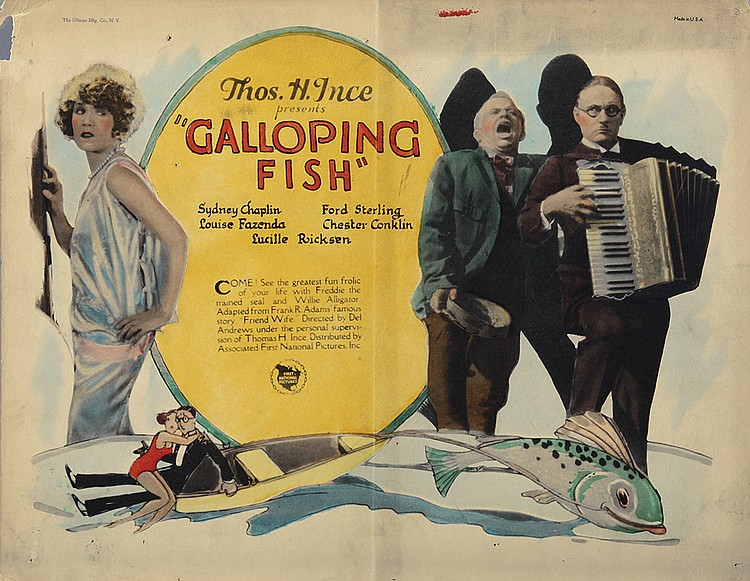
- Lobby card
- Directed by: Del Andrews
- Written by: Will Lambert (adaptation)
- Based on: Friend Wife by Frank R. Adams
- Starring: Louise Fazenda; Syd Chaplin; Ford Sterling; Chester Conklin; Lucille Ricksen; John Steppling
- Cinematography: Max Dupont; Conrad Wells
- Production company: Thomas H. Ince Corporation
- Distributed by: First National Pictures
- Release date: March 10, 1924
- Running time: 46 minutes
- Country: United States
- Language: Silent (English intertitles)

The Galloping Fish is a 1924 American silent comedy film directed by Del Andrews and starring Louise Fazenda, Syd Chaplin, Ford Sterling, Chester Conklin, Lucille Ricksen, and John Steppling. It is based on the 1917 novel Friend Wife by Frank R. Adams. The film was released by First National Pictures on March 10, 1924.

The film was later re-released by Selected Pictures in 1930 with talking sequences.

== Plot ==
As described in a film magazine review, Freddie, a trained seal, is smuggled out of a theatre using an ambulance by George Fitzgerald, the fiancé of his owner, Undine, a vaudeville performer, to escape seizure for debt. Freddy Wetherill, George's friend, assists. The latter is notified that his rich uncle is dying and wants Wetherill's wife Hyla to nurse him. But the husband and wife have quarreled, so Undine substitutes for the wife and is accompanied by George, as Wetherill's valet. A flood engulfs the uncle's house. The occupants seek the roof, where escaping animals from a circus also find refuge. They are all finally rescued by the seal, who conveys them ashore with the aid of a telegraph pole.

== Cast ==
- Louise Fazenda as Undine
- Syd Chaplin as Freddy Wetherill
- Ford Sterling as George Fitzgerald
- Chester Conklin as Jonah
- Lucille Ricksen as Hyla Wetherill
- John Steppling as Cato Dodd
- Freddie the Seal as The Trained Seal
- Willie Aligator as The Aligtaor (uncredited)
- Lloyd Ingraham as Process Server (uncredited)
- Eugene Pallette as Anti-Volstead Esquire (uncredited)
- Truly Shattuck as Mrs. Dodd (uncredited)

== Preservation ==
Prints of the film survive at the Filmoteka Narodowa in Warsaw, Poland and Cineteca Italiana in Milan, Italy.
