= Judgment of the Storm =

1924 film directed by Del Andrews

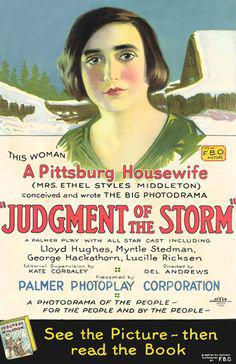
- Directed by: Del Andrews
- Story by: Ethel Styles Middleton
- Starring: Lloyd Hughes; Lucille Ricksen; George Hackathorne
- Cinematography: Max Dupont; Henry Sharp
- Production company: Palmer Photoplay Corporation
- Distributed by: Film Booking Offices of America
- Release date: January 6, 1924
- Running time: 70 minutes
- Country: United States
- Language: Silent (English intertitles)

Judgment of the Storm is a 1924 American silent drama film directed by Del Andrews and starring Lloyd Hughes, Lucille Ricksen, and George Hackathorne. A print exists in the Centre national du cinéma et de l'image animée film archive.

== Plot ==
As described in a film magazine review, wealthy college student John Trevor loves Mary Heath, who lives on a small, impoverished farm near the college town. Martin Freeland, an adventurous student, also admires her. The burden of supporting the Heath family rests upon Mary's sturdy older brother Dave. The younger, slightly built and much petted brother Bob goes to college. Martin takes Dave on a "sight seeing" tour of the town and John comes along to visit his mother. Dave is killed by accident while visiting a gambling den, which is secretly run by John's mother and is the source of the family's wealth. John is mad with grief and shame, and binds himself out to be a slave on the farm, for life, to atone. No chance is missed to humiliate him. During a storm, John rescues most of the family from otherwise certain death.

== Cast ==
- Lloyd Hughes as John Trevor
- Lucille Ricksen as Mary Heath
- George Hackathorne as Bob Heath
- Myrtle Stedman as Mrs. Trevor
- Claire McDowell as Mrs. Heath
- Philo McCullough as Martin Freeland
- Bruce Gordon as Dave Heath
- Frankie Darro as Heath Twin
- Fay McKenzie as Heath Twin
- F.F. Guenste as Butler

== Bibliography ==
- Munden, Kenneth White. The American Film Institute Catalog of Motion Pictures Produced in the United States, Part 1. University of California Press, 1997.
