= The Rendezvous (1923 film) =

1923 film directed by Marshall Neilan

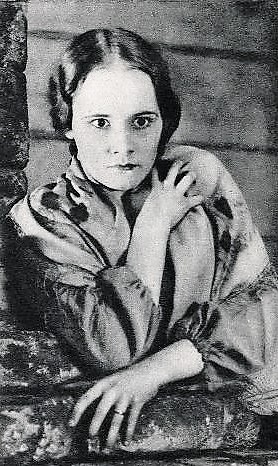
- Still with Ricksen
- Directed by: Marshall Neilan
- Written by: Josephine Lovett
- Story by: Madeleine Ruthven
- Produced by: Goldwyn Pictures
- Starring: Richard Travers; Lucille Ricksen; Conrad Nagel
- Cinematography: David Kesson
- Distributed by: Goldwyn Pictures
- Release date: November 11, 1923
- Running time: 85 minutes
- Country: United States
- Language: Silent (English intertitles)

The Rendezvous is a 1923 American silent adventure melodrama film with comedic overtones directed by Marshall Neilan and starring Richard Travers, Conrad Nagel, Lucille Ricksen, and Syd Chaplin. It was produced and distributed by Goldwyn Pictures.

== Plot ==
As described in a film magazine review, in the Russian Empire, Prince Sergei and his wife Varvara are exiled to Siberia by the Tsar Nicholas II. Varvara dies giving birth to a daughter, Vera, who is left in a friend's care by the father. 18 years later, Cossacks raid the country. Walter Stanford, an officer in the American Expeditionary Force, Siberia, rescues Vera from a Cossack raid at a shrine, but she is forced to wed a Cossack chief. After the chief is killed, Vera and Stanford are united and they marry.

== Cast ==
- Conrad Nagel as Walter Stanford
- Lucille Ricksen as Vera
- Richard Travers as Prince Sergei
- Kathleen Key as Varvara
- Emmett Corrigan as Vassily
- Elmo Lincoln as Godunoff
- Syd Chaplin as Winkie (credited as Sydney Chaplin)
- Kate Lester as Mrs. Stanford
- Cecil Holland as Nichi
- Lucien Littlefield as Commissar
- Max Davidson as Commissar
- Eugenie Besserer as Nini
- R. O. Pennell as Czar

== Production ==
The film was shot in San Francisco and Los Angeles using real-life U.S. Army soldiers as extras.

== Preservation status ==
This is a surviving silent film preserved by Metro-Goldwyn-Mayer.
