= Trimmed in Scarlet =

1923 film by Jack Conway

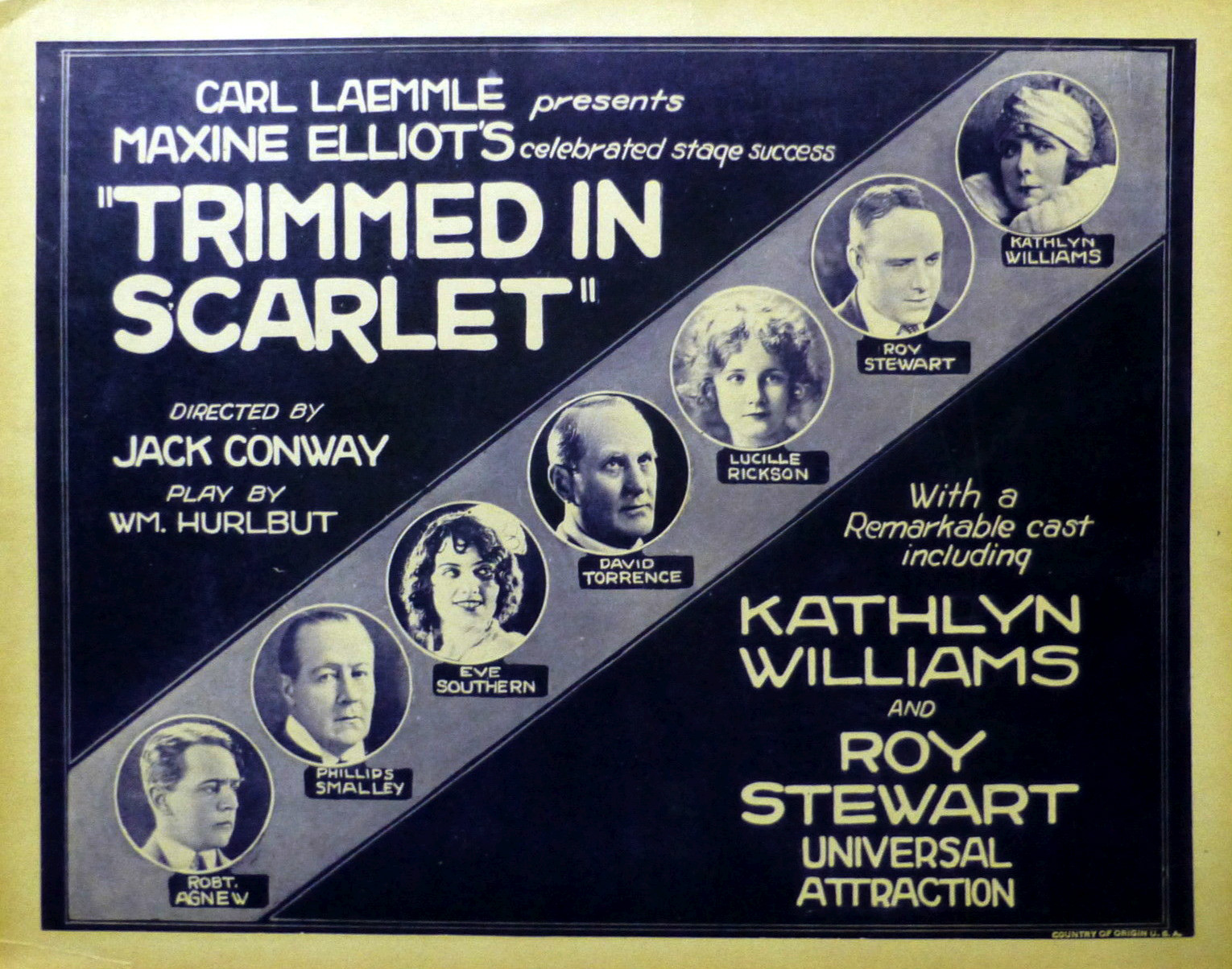
- Lobby card
- Directed by: Jack Conway
- Written by: Edward T. Lowe, Jr.
- Based on: Trimmed in Scarlet by William Hurlbut
- Produced by: Carl Laemmle
- Starring: Kathlyn Williams; Roy Stewart; Lucille Ricksen
- Cinematography: Charles Kaufman
- Distributed by: Universal Pictures
- Release date: April 9, 1923
- Running time: 54 minutes
- Country: United States
- Language: Silent (English intertitles)

Trimmed in Scarlet is a 1923 American silent drama film directed by Jack Conway and produced and distributed by Universal Pictures. It is based on the 1920 Broadway play, Trimmed in Scarlet, by William Hurlbut and starring Broadway's Maxine Elliott. This play marked the last time Maxine Elliott appeared on Broadway. Her role in the film is played by veteran cinema star Kathlyn Williams. All prints of this film are believed lost.

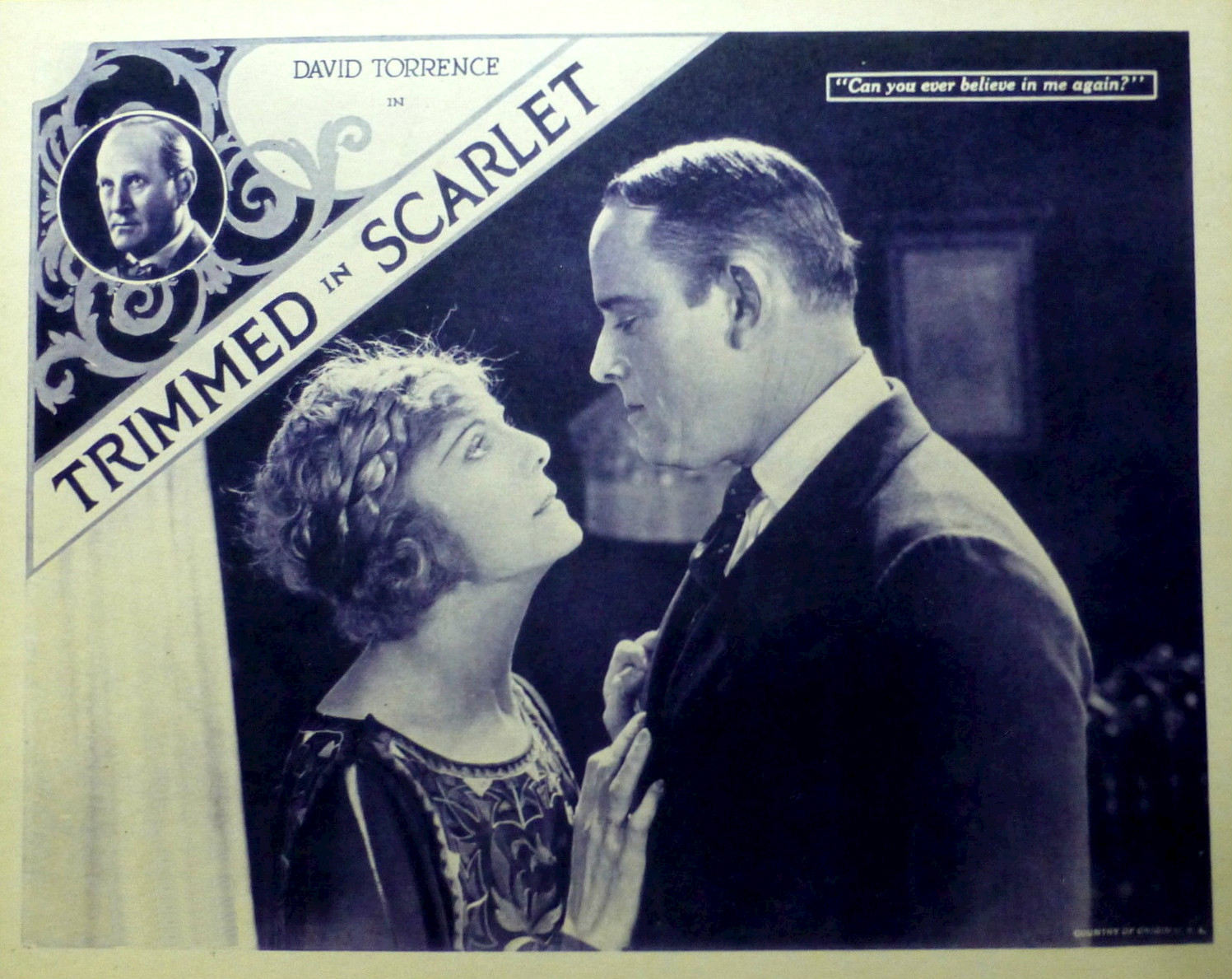
Lobby card

== Cast ==
- Kathlyn Williams as Cordelia Ebbing / Madame de la Fleur
- Roy Stewart as Revere Wayne
- Lucille Ricksen as Faith Ebbing (credited as Lucille Rickson)
- Robert Agnew as David Pierce
- David Torrence as Charles Knight
- Phillips Smalley as Peter Ebbing
- Eve Southern as Fifi Barclay
- Bert Sprotte as Duroc
- Grace Carlyle as Molly Todd
- Gerard Alexander as Ruth Kipp (credited as Gerard Grassby)
- Raymond Hatton as Mr. Kipp
- Philo McCullough as Count De Signeur
