= Those Who Dance (1924 film) =

1924 film by Lambert Hillyer

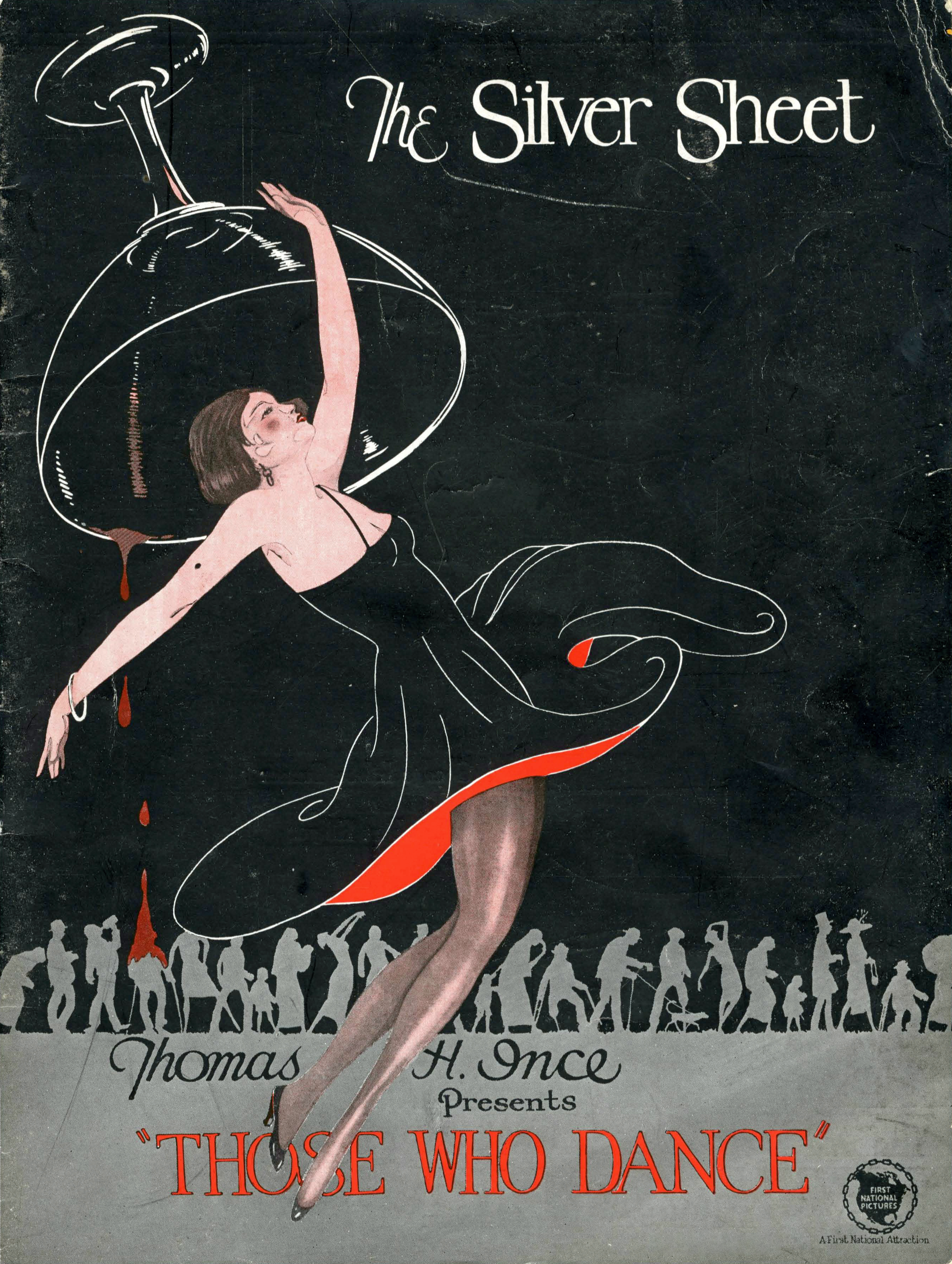
- Cover of promotional publication
- Directed by: Lambert Hillyer
- Written by: Lambert Hillyer (adaptation); Arthur F. Slatter (adaptation)
- Story by: George Kibbe Turner
- Produced by: Thomas H. Ince
- Starring: Blanche Sweet; Bessie Love; Warner Baxter
- Cinematography: Sidney Hickox
- Distributed by: Associated First National
- Release date: April 28, 1924 (U.S.)
- Running time: 8 reels; 7,312 feet
- Country: United States
- Language: Silent (English intertitles)

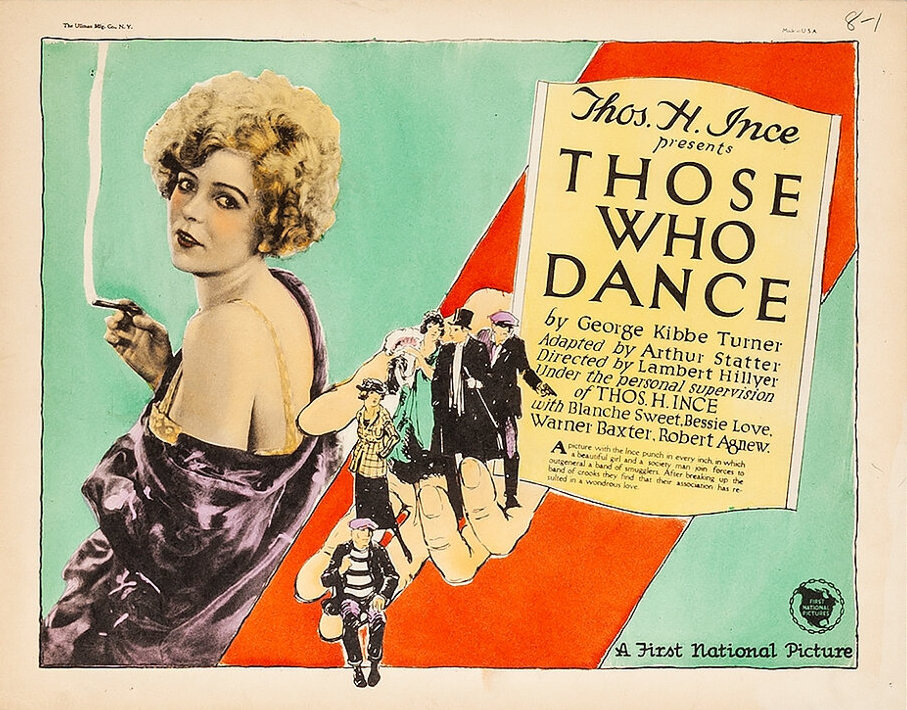
Lobby card for the film.

Those Who Dance is a lost 1924 American silent drama film produced by Thomas H. Ince and directed by Lambert Hillyer. Released by Associated First National, the film stars Blanche Sweet, Bessie Love, and Warner Baxter. It is based on a story by George Kibbe Turner.

Warner Bros. later inherited First National in a merger and remade the film in 1930 as Those Who Dance, which exists at the Library of Congress.

== Plot ==
When a young lawyer Bob Kane's sister is killed in a bootleg liquor-related accident, he seeks justice by joining the prohibition force. He is assigned to shadow a corrupt officer who helps the district's bootleg king.

When Matt Carney, another young man, falls in with the gang, his mother sends his sister Rose to the city to find him. Rose finds Matt and realizes the only way to save him is to infiltrate the gang herself. The gang frames Matt for the murder of a federal officer, and he is sentenced to death. Vida, the bootleg king's wife, tells Rose that Matt was framed, and Rose appeals to the chief of the prohibition force for help. He assigns Bob to work with her, and Bob disguises himself as a notorious criminal. Using a Dictograph, he overhears enough to prove Matt's innocence.

At the gang's annual ball, Vida blows his cover by rubbing a fake scar off Bob's face. The bootleg king tries to kill him, but Rose seizes the gun. Her shot misses, but as the kingpin flees, the corrupt officer shoots him before he can testify. The prohibition force arrives, arrests the bootleg gang, and Matt is freed.

== Production ==
Those Who Dance was the first film produced at the Ince studios to be shot entirely behind closed doors. Ince restricted access to the set out of concern that visitors would misinterpret the film's more controversial scenes.

The film's climactic underworld ball required several days of construction to build a set modeled after a real-life New York hall. More than five hundred dancing couples and two jazz bands were used, with cameras filming from multiple angles.

For a key scene involving adjoining rooms, director Lambert Hillyer had a working Dictograph installed on set rather than directing through a megaphone. Cameras simultaneously filmed Mathew Betz and Bessie Love in one room, and Blanche Sweet and Warner Baxter in another. The scene was filmed in a single take after one rehearsal.

== Cast ==
- Blanche Sweet as Rose Carney
- Bessie Love as Vida Anargas
- Warner Baxter as Bob Kane
- Robert Agnew as Matt Carney
- John Sainpolis as Monahan
- Lucille Ricksen as Ruth Kane
- Mathew Betz as Joe "the Greek" Anargas
- Lydia Knott as Mrs. Carney
- Charles Delaney as Tom Andrus
- W. S. McDunnough as Bob Kane's Father
- Jack Perrin as Frank Church
- Frank Campeau as "Slip" Blaney

== Reception ==
The film received positive reviews. Blanche Sweet's performance was praised, and Bessie Love's received even higher praise for playing—against type—an underworld flapper.

== Preservation ==
With no holdings located in archives, Those Who Dance is considered a lost film.
