= Philo McCullough =

American actor

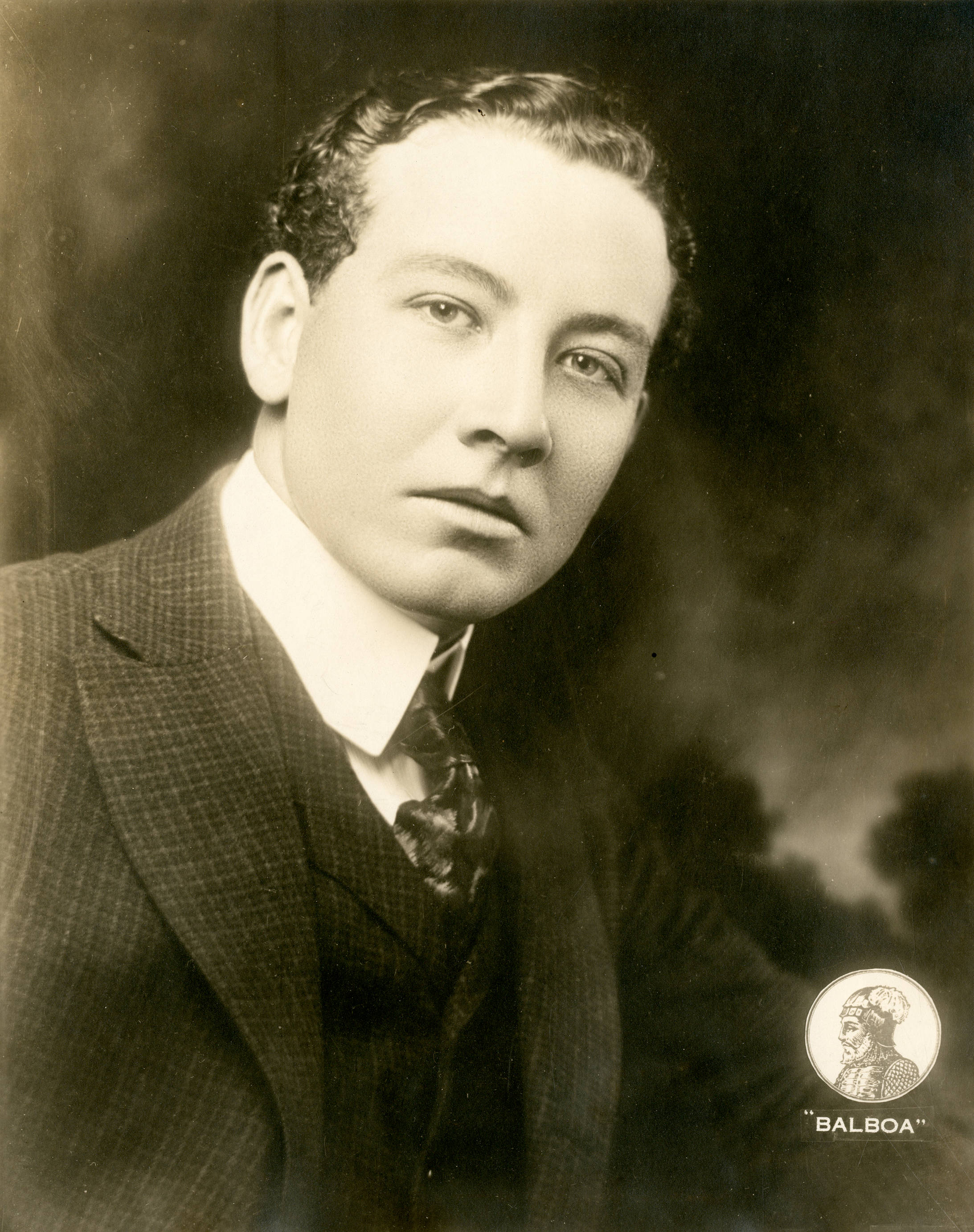
- McCullough in 1916
- Born: January 16, 1893; San Bernardino, California, US
- Died: June 5, 1981 (aged 88); Burbank, California, US
- Occupation: Actor
- Years active: 1914-1969

Philo McCullough (June 16, 1893 – June 5, 1981) was an American actor. He appeared in more than 250 films between 1914 and 1969. He was born in San Bernardino, California, and died in Burbank, California.

McCullough's film debut came in 1912 with the Selig Company. He initially acted in light comedy roles, and in 1921 he directed Maid of the West. After that, he appeared primarily as a villain.

== Selected filmography ==
- The Livid Flame (1914, Short)
- The Grip of Evil (1916)
- Vengeance of the Dead (1917)
- The Neglected Wife (1917)
- Tears and Smiles (1917)
- The Legion of Death (1918)
- A Rich Man's Darling (1918)
- Modern Love (1918)
- The Dream Lady (1918)
- The Girl Who Wouldn't Quit (1918)
- Daughter Angele (1918)
- Happy Though Married (1919)
- The Gay Lord Quex (1919)
- Johnny-on-the-Spot (1919)
- The Scoffer (1920)
- A Splendid Hazard (1920)
- Flame of Youth (1920)
- The Great Accident (1920)
- In the Heart of a Fool (1920)
- The Little Grey Mouse (1920)
- The Blushing Bride (1921)
- The Lamplighter (1921)
- Partners of Fate (1921)
- West of Chicago (1922)
- The Strangers' Banquet (1922)
- The Right That Failed (1922)
- Seeing's Believing (1922)
- Calvert's Valley (1922)
- The First Degree (1923)
- Yesterday's Wife (1923)
- The Fourth Musketeer (1923)
- Trilby (1923)
- Trimmed in Scarlet (1923)
- Forgive and Forget (1923)
- Hook and Ladder (1924)
- Wife of the Centaur (1924)
- Judgment of the Storm (1924)
- The Chorus Lady (1924)
- Racing for Life (1924)
- Daughters of Today (1924)
- Dick Turpin (1925)
- The Calgary Stampede (1925)
- The Boomerang (1925)
- The Mansion of Aching Hearts (1925)
- Chip of the Flying U (1926)
- The Devil's Partner (1926)
- Silver Valley (1927)
- The Woman Who Did Not Care (1927)
- The Night Flyer (1928)
- Warming Up (1928)
- Lilac Time (1928)
- The Power of the Press (1928)
- Untamed Justice (1929)
- The Show of Shows (1929)
- Defenders of the Law (1931)
- Swanee River (1931)
- Grand Hotel (1932)
- Sons of the Desert (1933)
- The Mighty Barnum (1934)
- Clive of India (1935)
- Les Misérables (1935)
- Annie Oakley (1935)
- Klondike Annie (1936)
- The Plainsman (1936)
- Born to Fight (1936)
- Captains Courageous (1937)
- The Buccaneer (1938)
- Young Mr. Lincoln (1939)
- Frontier Marshal (1939)
- Mr. Smith Goes to Washington (1939)
- Destry Rides Again (1939)
- My Little Chickadee (1940)
- Edison, the Man (1940)
- Here Comes Mr. Jordan (1941)
- The Lodger (1944)
- Mr. Skeffington (1944)
- Hail the Conquering Hero (1944)
- Mildred Pierce (1945)
- Deception (1946)
- Life with Father (1947)
- Silver River (1948)
- Easter Parade (1948)
- Samson and Delilah (1949)
- Stars in My Crown (1950)
- Father of the Bride (1950)
- Harvey (1950)
- My Favorite Spy (1951)
- Singin' in the Rain (1952) - Audience Member (uncredited)
- House of Wax (1953)
- Titanic (1953)
- Calamity Jane (1953)
- A Star Is Born (1954)
- Destry (1954)
- East of Eden (1955)
- The Seven Little Foys (1955)
- High Society (1956)
- Giant (1956)
- Raintree County (1957)
- Teacher's Pet (1958)
- Cheyenne TV series (1958) - as Townsman (uncredited)
- The Last Hurrah (1958)
- The Young Philadelphians (1959)
- Heller in Pink Tights (1960)
- A Fever in the Blood (1961)
- Wild in the Country (1961)
- Cheyenne Autumn (1964)
- My Fair Lady (1964) - Ball Guest (uncredited)
- The Great Race (1965)
- Big Deal at Dodge City (1966)
- Hotel (1967)
- The Great Bank Robbery (1969)
- They Shoot Horses, Don't They? (1969)
