= Bessie Love =

American actress (1898–1986)

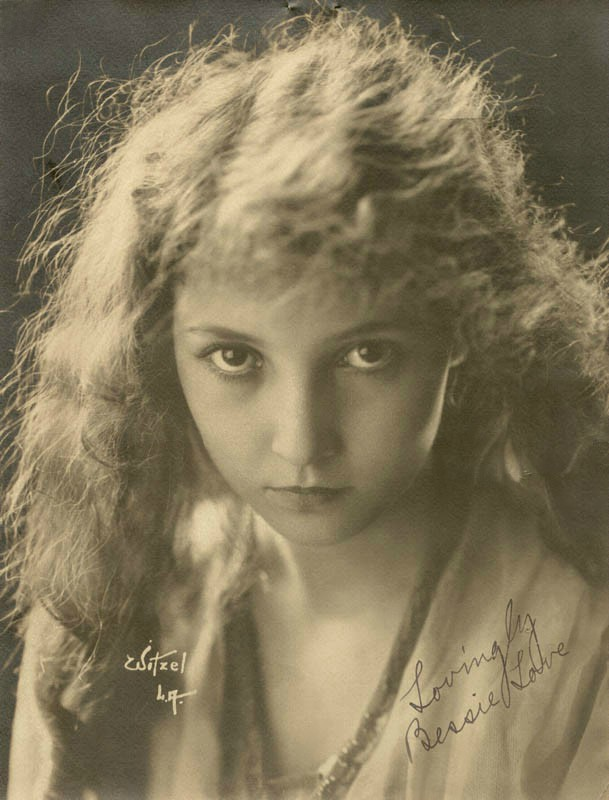
- Love in 1918
- Born: Juanita Horton; September 10, 1898; Midland, Texas, U.S.
- Died: April 26, 1986 (aged 87); London, England
- Resting place: Breakspear Crematorium, London, England
- Citizenship: American; British
- Occupations: Actress; writer
- Years active: 1915–1983
- Spouse: William Hawks (m. 1929; div. 1936)
- Children: 1
- Relatives: Howard Hawks (brother-in-law); Kenneth Hawks (brother-in-law); Mary Astor (sister-in-law); Athole Shearer (sister-in-law)
- Awards: WAMPAS Baby Star; Hollywood Walk of Fame

Bessie Love (born Juanita Horton; September 10, 1898 – April 26, 1986) was an American-British actress who achieved prominence playing innocent, young girls and wholesome leading ladies in silent and early sound films. Her acting career spanned nearly seven decades—from silent film to sound film, including theatre, radio, and television—and her performance in The Broadway Melody (1929) earned her a nomination for the Academy Award for Best Actress.

== Early life ==
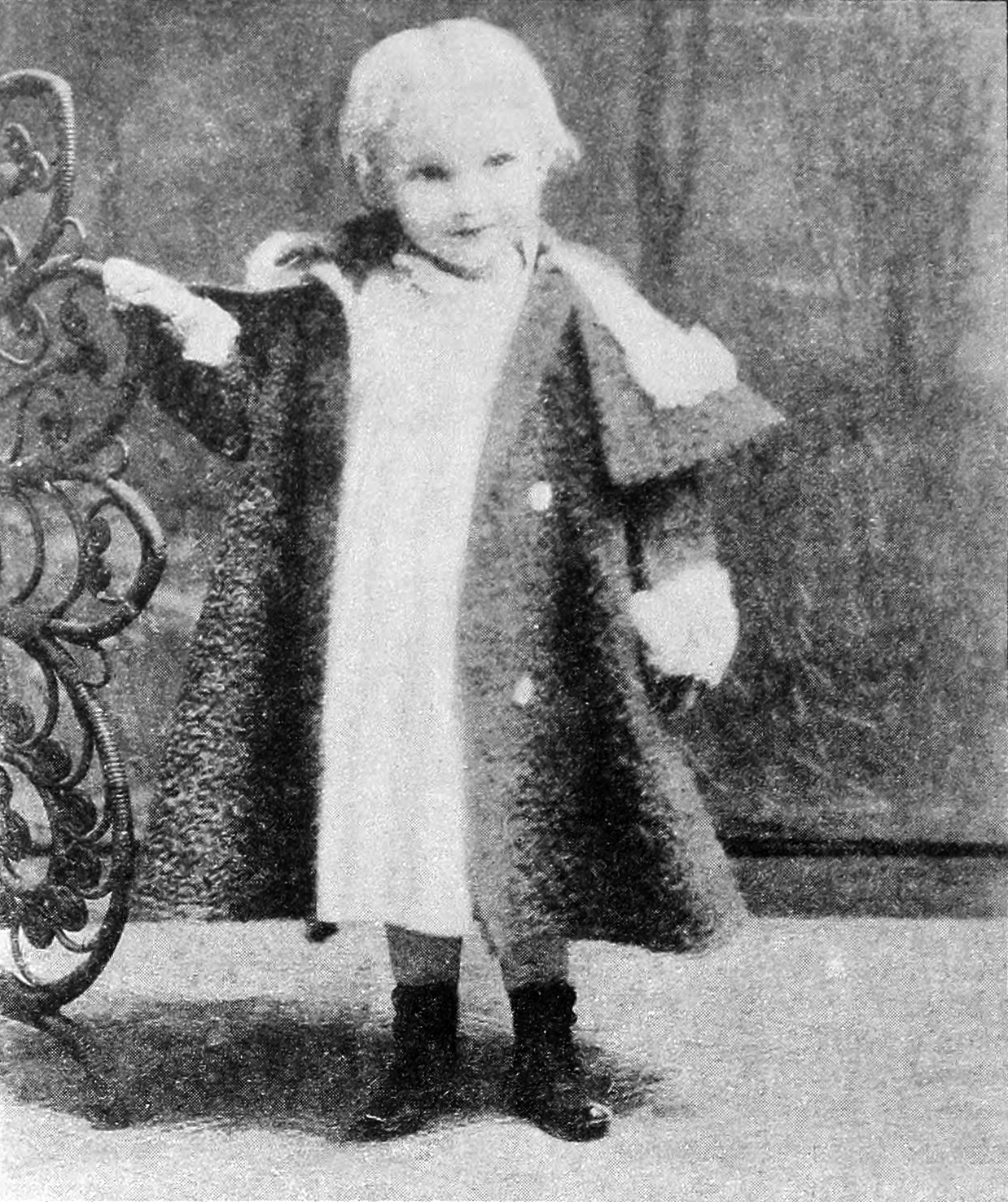
Horton as a child in Texas

Love was born Juanita Horton in Midland, Texas, to John Cross Horton and Emma Jane Horton (née Savage). Her father was a cowboy and bartender, while her mother worked in and managed restaurants. She attended school in Midland until she was in the eighth grade, when her family moved to Arizona, New Mexico, and then to California, where they settled in Hollywood. When in Hollywood, her father became a chiropractor, and her mother worked at the Jantzen's Knitwear and Bathing Suits factory.

== Career ==
=== The silent era ===
==== 1915–1920: Young ingenue ====
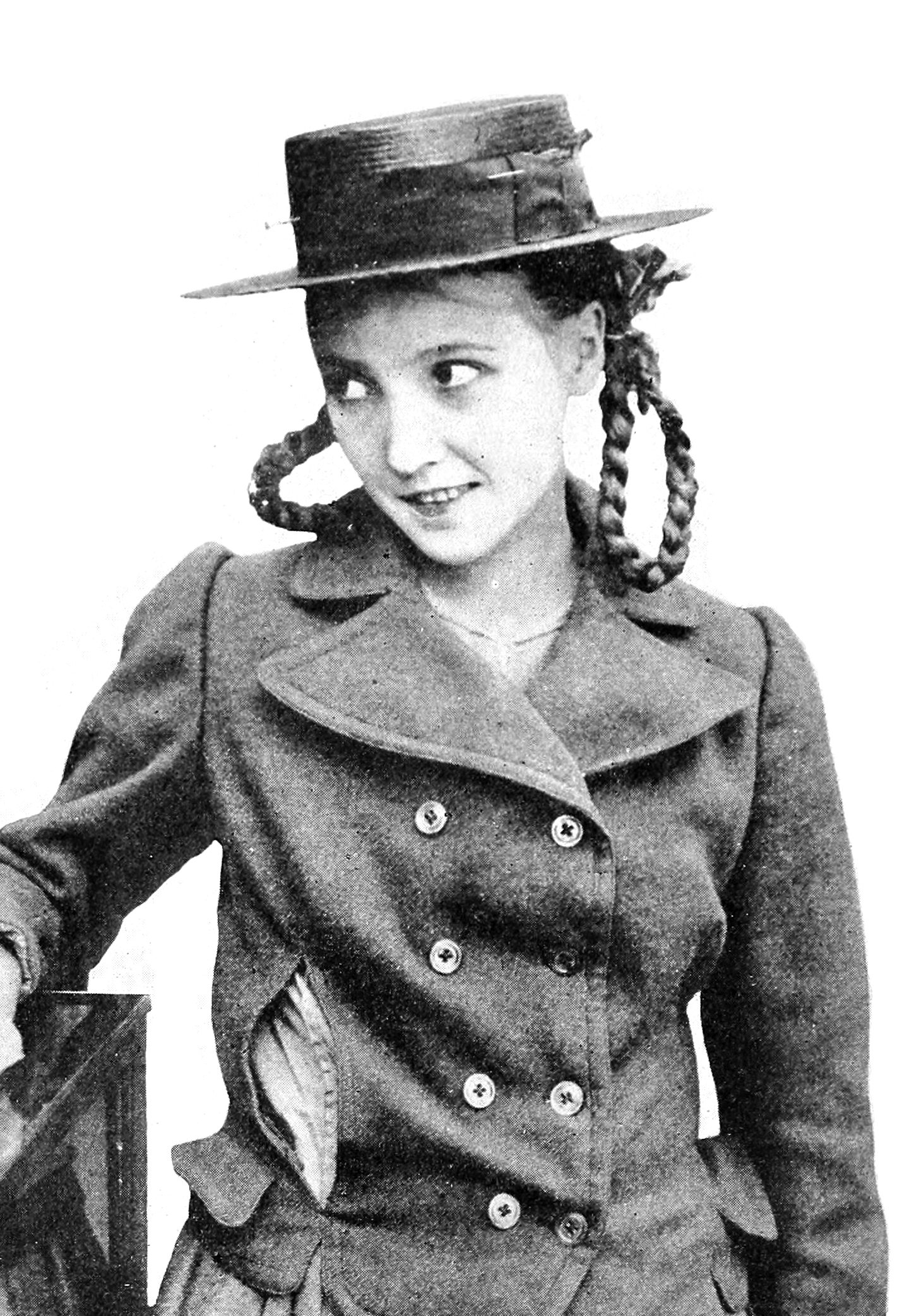
Love as Hulda, the Swedish maid, in The Flying Torpedo (1916), her second onscreen appearance

In June 1915, while a student at Los Angeles High School, Horton went to the set of a film to meet with actor Tom Mix, who had recommended that she visit him if she wanted to "get into pictures". However, when Mix was unavailable, she was advised to meet with pioneering film director D. W. Griffith, who placed her under personal contract. When it was decided that her given name was too long for theater marquees and too difficult to pronounce, Griffith's associate Frank Woods gave Horton the stage name Bessie Love: "Bessie, because any child can pronounce it. And Love, because we want everyone to love her!" Love dropped out of high school to pursue her film career, but she completed her diploma in 1919.

Griffith gave her a small role in his Intolerance (1916). Although Intolerance was her first performance to be filmed, it was her ninth film to be released. The first films Love made were with Griffith's Fine Arts company, yet Intolerance was the only film that he formally directed. (Note: At Fine Arts, other directors would direct the films, but Griffith would direct the final rehearsal before filming.)

Her "first role of importance"—in the second of her films to be released—was in The Flying Torpedo (1916). She later appeared opposite William S. Hart in The Aryan and with Douglas Fairbanks in The Good Bad-Man, Reggie Mixes In, and The Mystery of the Leaping Fish (all 1916). This string of appearances and supporting roles led to her first starring role, in A Sister of Six (1916). In her early career, she was likened to Mary Pickford, and was called "Our Mary" by Griffith.

In early 1918, Love left Fine Arts for a better contract with Pathé. After the Pathé films were unsuccessful, she signed a nine-film contract with Vitagraph later that year, (Note: All nine films with Vitagraph were made: 1918's The Dawn of Understanding; 1919's The Enchanted Barn, The Wishing Ring Man, A Yankee Princess, The Little Boss, Cupid Forecloses, Over the Garden Wall, and A Fighting Colleen; and 1920's Pegeen.) all of which were directed by David Smith. Her performances often received positive reviews, but her films often were shown at smaller movie theaters, which impacted the growth of her career.

==== 1921–1928: Dramatic actress ====
Upon the completion of her Vitagraph contract, Love became a free agent. She took an active role in the management of her career, and was represented by Gerald C. Duffy, the former editor of Picture-Play Magazine.

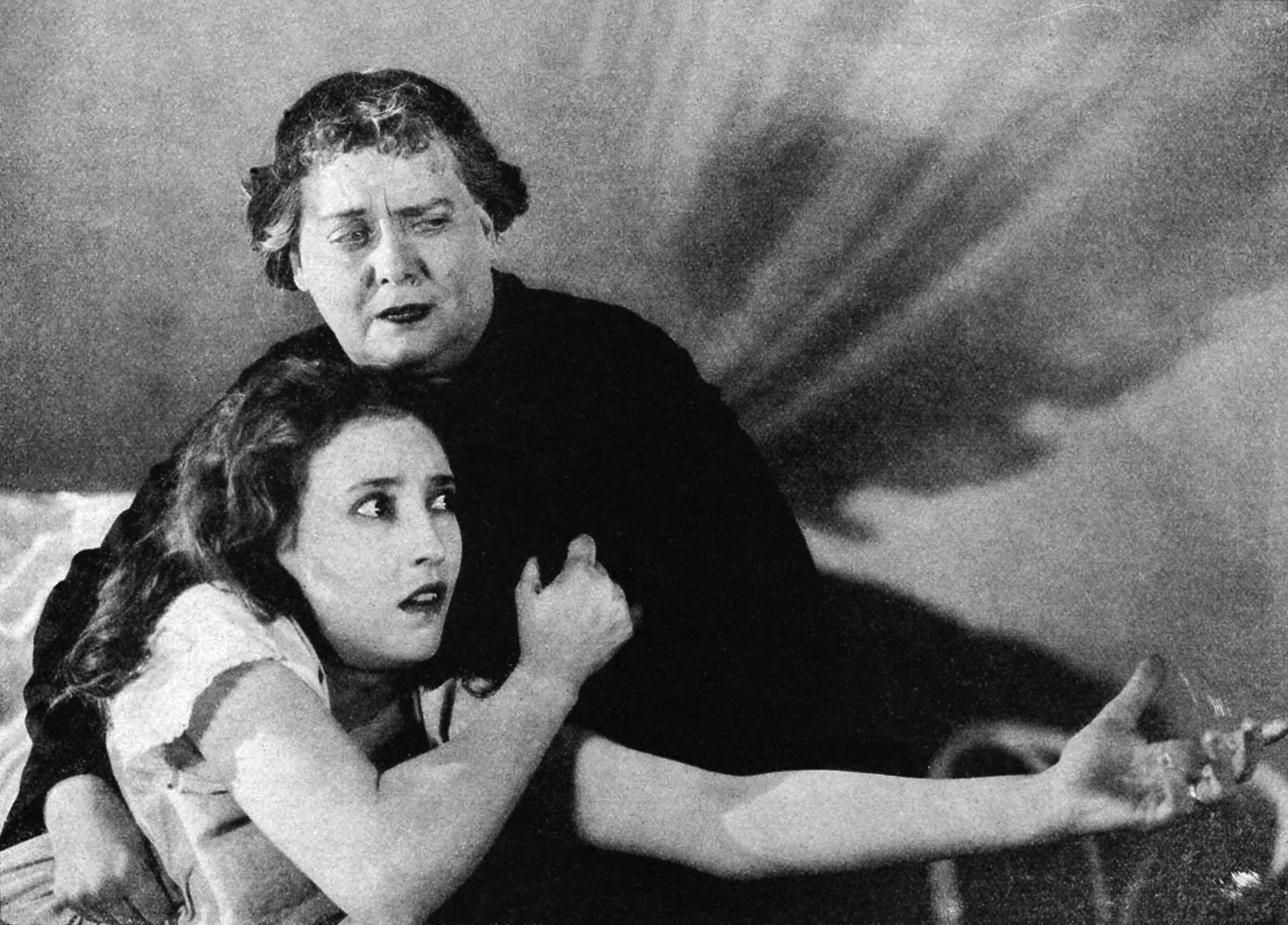
With Victory Bateman in Human Wreckage (1923)

Love sought roles that were different from the little girls she had portrayed earlier in her career when under contract to studios. She played Asian women in The Vermilion Pencil (1922) and The Purple Dawn (1923); a drug-addicted mother in Human Wreckage (1923); a woman accused of murder in The Woman on the Jury (1924); an underworld flapper in Those Who Dance (1924); and versions of her real-life self in Night Life in Hollywood (1922), Souls for Sale (1923), and Mary of the Movies (1923).

As a film star, she was expected to entertain studio executives at parties, so she learned to sing, dance, and play the ukulele. She gradually honed these skills and later performed them onscreen and on the stage. Because of her performance in The King on Main Street (1925), Love is credited with being the first person to dance the Charleston on film, popularizing it in the United States. Her technique was documented in instructional guides, including a series of photographs by Edward Steichen. She subsequently performed the dance the following year in The Song and Dance Man.

In 1925, she starred in The Lost World, a science fiction adventure based on the novel of the same title by Sir Arthur Conan Doyle. In 1927, she appeared in the successful Dress Parade, and was so impressed by her experiences on location that she wrote the unpublished novel Military Mary. A year later, she starred in The Matinee Idol, a romantic comedy directed by a young Frank Capra. Despite these successes, Love's career was on the decline. She lived frugally so she could afford lessons in singing and dancing.

=== The sound era and stage work ===
==== 1929–1930: Musical comedy star ====
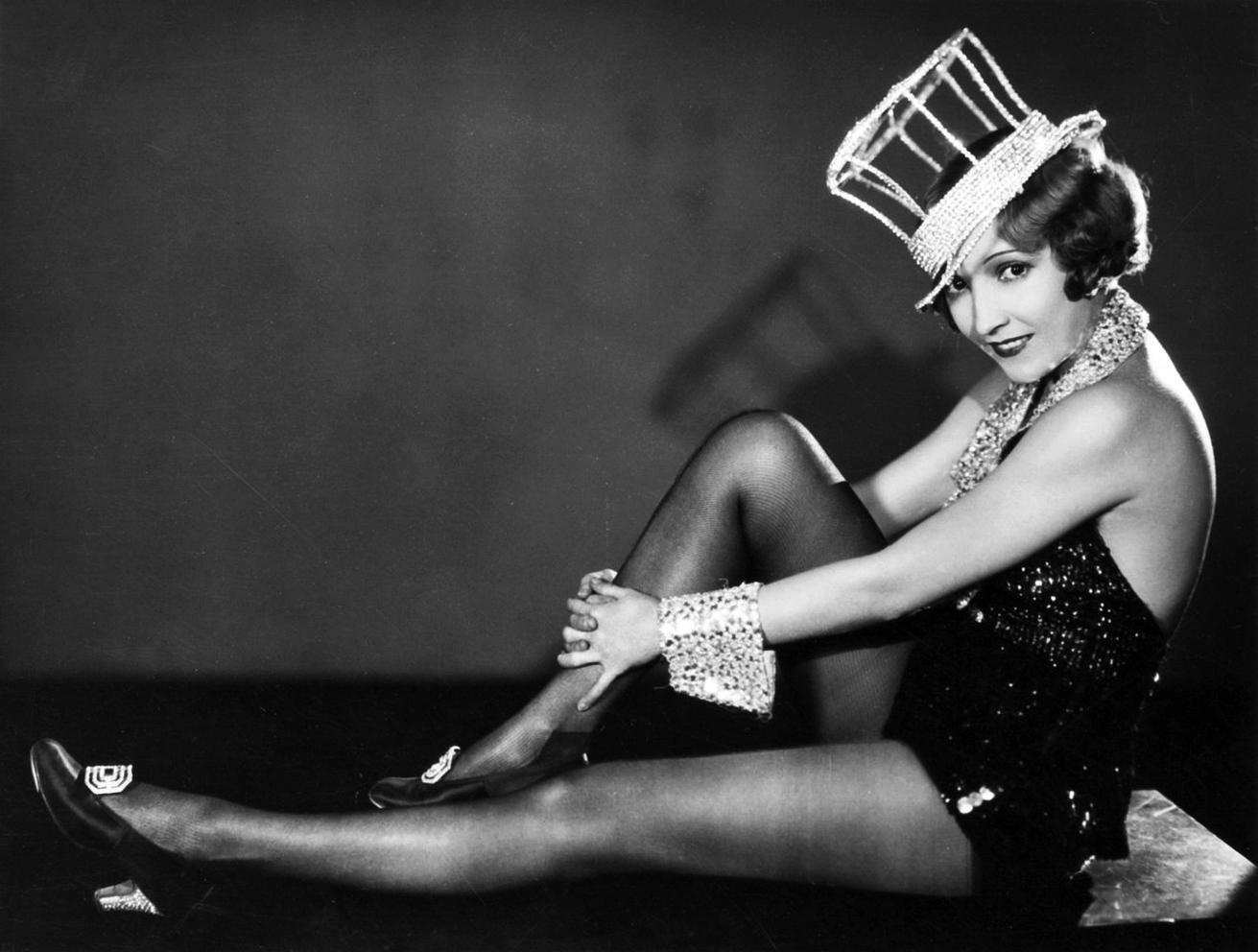
Love, photographed by Ruth Harriet Louise to promote The Broadway Melody (1929)

Love toured with a musical revue for sixteen weeks, which was so physically demanding that she broke a rib. The experience she gained on the vaudeville stage singing and dancing in three performances a day prepared her for the introduction of sound films. She appeared in the successful sound musical short film The Swell Head in early 1928, and was signed to MGM later that year.

In 1929, she appeared in her first feature-length sound film, the musical The Broadway Melody. Her performance earned her a nomination for the Academy Award for Best Actress, and the success of the film resulted in a five-year contract with MGM and an increase in her weekly salary from US$500 to $3,000 (equivalent to $56,000 in 2025)—$1,000 more than her male co-star Charles King.

She appeared in several other early musicals, including 1929's The Hollywood Revue of 1929 and 1930's Chasing Rainbows, Good News, and They Learned About Women. Her success in these musicals earned her the title "the screen's first musical comedy star."

==== 1931–1943: Semi-retirement ====
However, the success of musical films waned, again putting her career in decline. Love is quoted as saying of her career: "I guess I'm through. They don't seem to want me any more." She shifted focus to her personal life, marrying in December 1929.

She semi-retired from films, and traveled with a musical revue that included clips from her films The Broadway Melody, The Hollywood Revue, and Chasing Rainbows. While on tour, she learned she was pregnant with her daughter, who was born in 1932. Love stopped her stage work to raise her daughter. In 1935, Love moved to England, briefly returning to the United States in 1936 to obtain a divorce.

During World War II in Britain, when it was difficult to find employment as an actress, Love worked as the script supervisor on the film drama San Demetrio London (1943). She also worked for the American Red Cross.

==== 1944–1983: Working actress ====
Towards the end of the war, Love began acting again, this time primarily in the theater and on BBC radio as a member of their Drama Repertory Company; she also played small roles in British films, often as an American tourist. Stage work included such productions as Love in Idleness (1944) and Born Yesterday (1947). She wrote and performed in The Homecoming, a semiautobiographical play, which opened in Perth, Scotland in 1958. Film work included The Barefoot Contessa (1954) with Humphrey Bogart, and Ealing Studios' Nowhere to Go (1958), and Next to No Time, 1958. She had supporting roles in The Greengage Summer (1961) starring Kenneth More, the James Bond thriller On Her Majesty's Secret Service (1969), and John Schlesinger's Sunday Bloody Sunday (1971). In addition to playing the mother of Vanessa Redgrave's titular character in Isadora (1968), Love also served as dialect coach to the actress.

On television, Love appeared in dozens of episodes of British television shows in the 1950s, 1960s, and 1970s. In October 1963, she became the subject of This Is Your Life when host Eamonn Andrews surprised her at the stage door of Never Too Late after its London opening. Guests included London Scrapbook director Derrick De Marney, her Forget Me Not (1922) co-star Gareth Hughes, actor Percy Marmont, her friend and Those Who Dance (1924) co-star Blanche Sweet, and her daughter Patricia.

Love appeared in John Osborne's play West of Suez (1971), and as "Aunt Pittypat" in a large-scale musical version of Gone with the Wind (1972) and as an "American Lady" in Vampyres (1974). She also played Maud Cunard in the TV miniseries Edward & Mrs. Simpson in 1978. Her film work continued through the seventies with movies like The Ritz (1976), Sunday Bloody Sunday (1971), and Gulliver's Travels (1981), and into the 1980s with roles in Ragtime (1981), Reds (1981), Lady Chatterley's Lover (1981), and her final film The Hunger (1983).

== Personal life ==
Love was an early resident of the Laurel Canyon celebrity enclave, purchasing her first property in 1917, and a second in 1920, a log cabin that had previously operated as a roadhouse and which later became home to musician Frank Zappa.

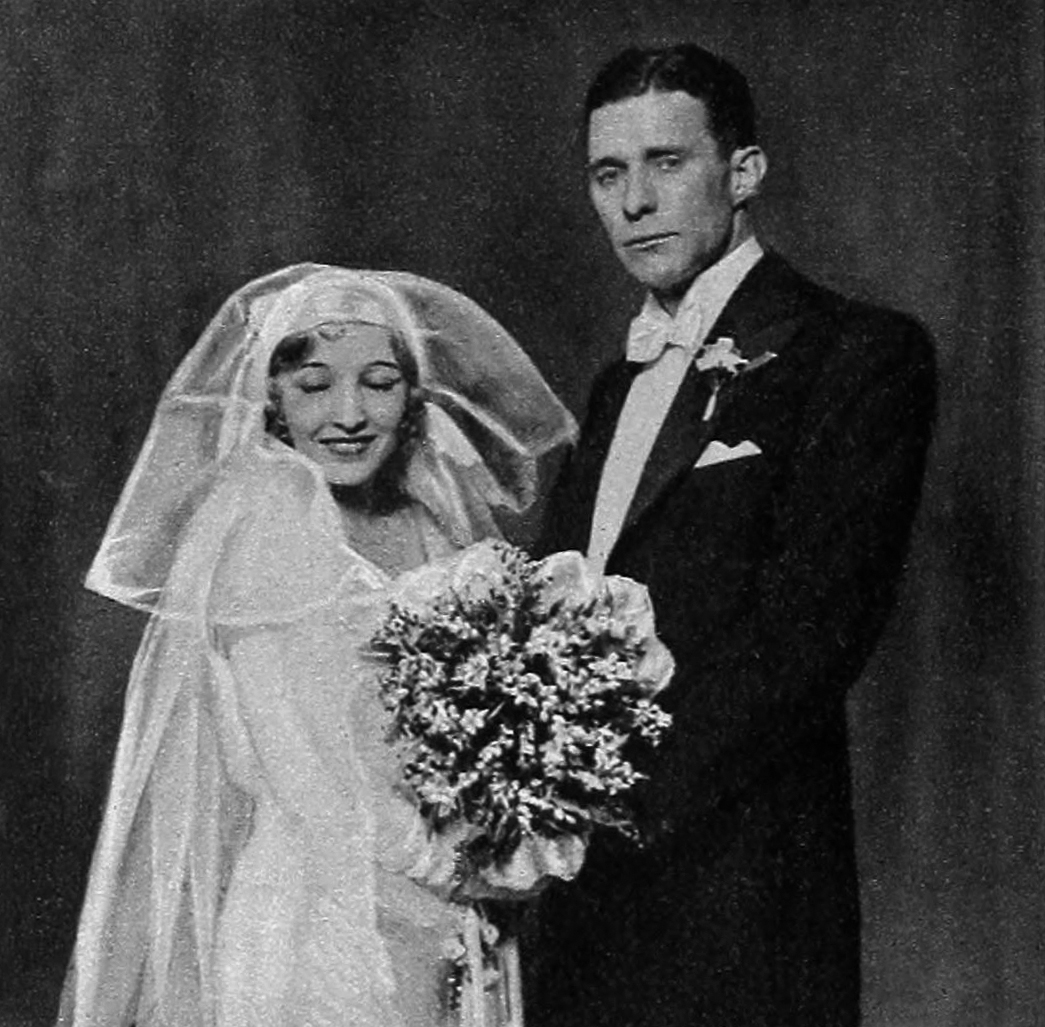
Wedding portrait of Love and Hawks

Love married then-stockbroker William Hawks at St. James' Episcopal Church in South Pasadena, California on December 27, 1929. Blanche Sweet was her matron of honor; Bebe Daniels, Carmel Myers, Norma Shearer, and Hawks's sister-in-law Mary Astor were among her bridesmaids; and Irving Thalberg and Hawks's brother Howard served as ushers. Adrian had designed a wedding dress for Love, but she instead wore a silk charmeuse gown by Howard Greer. The ceremony was attended by such celebrities as Cecil Beaton, Ronald Colman, Cecil B. DeMille, Hedda Hopper, Laura La Plante, Harold Lloyd, Anita Loos, Ramon Novarro, and William Powell, and it was mobbed by a crowd of 25,000. The wedding and reception were documented by the press and by Beaton in his Diaries, where he wrote that Love "looked like a terrified bird" but "radiated love".

Following their wedding, the couple lived at the Havenhurst Apartments in Hollywood, and their only child, Patricia, was born in 1932. (Note: The exact birthday of Patricia Hawks is February 19, 1932. She studied dance at the Ballet Rambert, had bit parts in films in 1952, and appeared in a West End production of Candide later that decade. She married actor Julian Pepper, with whom she had two children, Edmund and Hannah.) Four years later, the couple divorced.

Love moved to England with her daughter in 1935, a year before her divorce was final. Her life in England kept her out of the eye of her American fans, which resulted in the American press erroneously reporting her as dead multiple times. Love became a British subject in the late 1960s. Love was a Christian Scientist.

=== Later years and death ===
After several years of declining health, Love died at the Mount Vernon Hospital in Northwood, London, from natural causes on April 26, 1986.

== Legacy ==
=== Honors ===
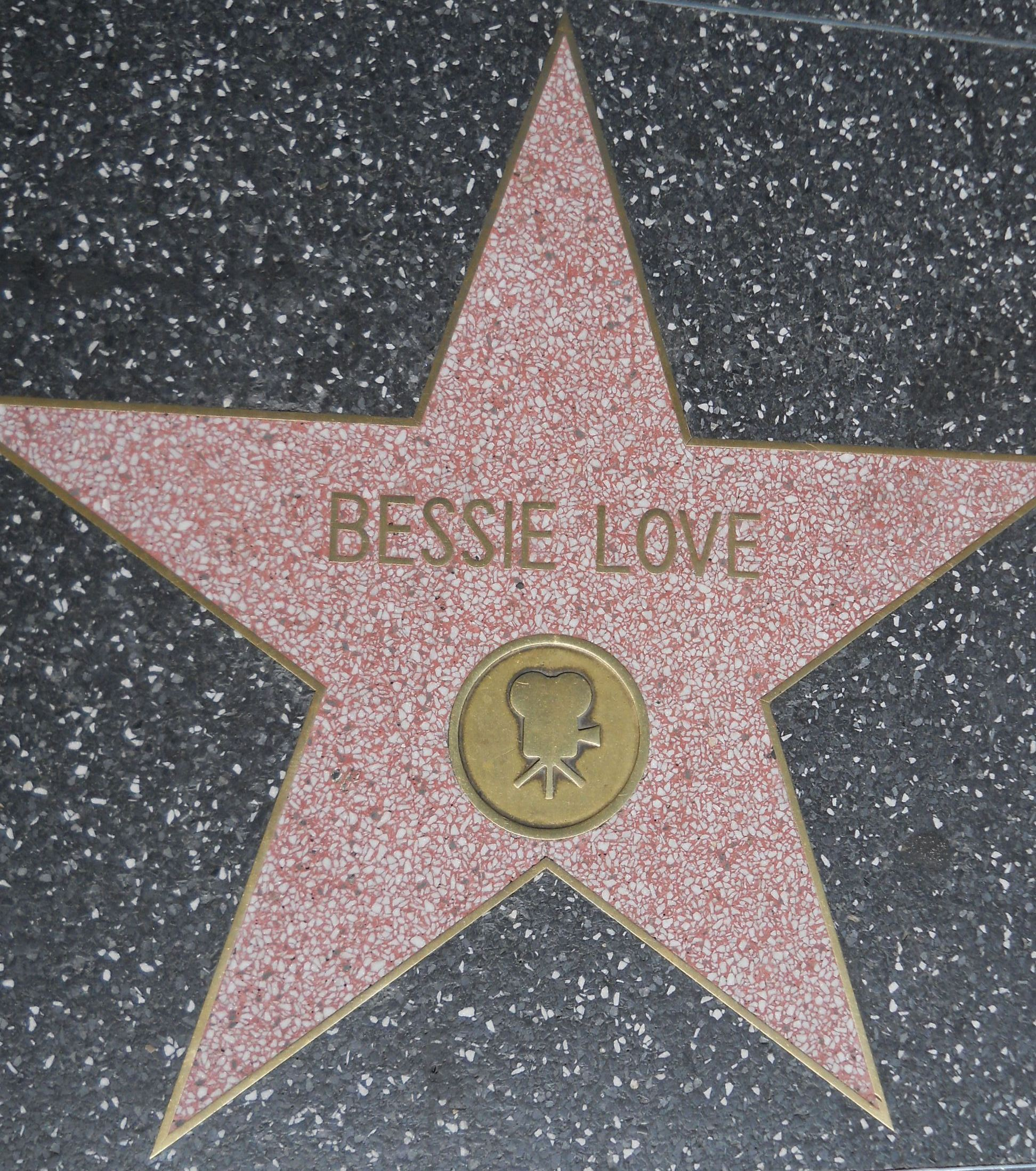
Love's star on Hollywood Walk of Fame at 6777 Hollywood Blvd.

For her contributions to the motion picture industry, Love was honored with a star on the Hollywood Walk of Fame in 1960 at 6777 Hollywood Boulevard.

=== Cinema ===
In Damien Chazelle's 2022 film Babylon, fellow Academy Award nominee Margot Robbie wears overalls with nothing underneath, which pays homage to a famous photo of Love.

=== Portraiture ===
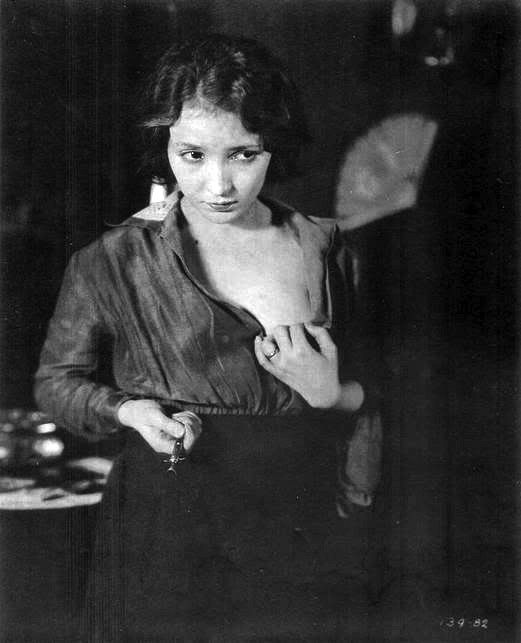
Love in the Human Wreckage photo that inspired Fowler and McKean

Portraits of Love are preserved in public and private collections, including those of the Smithsonian National Portrait Gallery in Washington, D.C., and the National Portrait Gallery in London. A photograph of Love promoting Human Wreckage (1923) inspired art by Nina Mae Fowler and Dave McKean.

Cartoonist Alex Gard created a caricature of Love for Sardi's, the famed restaurant in Manhattan's Theater District. It is now part of the Billy Rose Theatre Division of the New York Public Library for the Performing Arts. A Vargas illustration of Love as a young woman appeared in Playboy – published in December 1978 when Love was 80 years old.

Despite her demure public image, Love was photographed in the nude by James Abbe and Clarence Sinclair Bull, and in sheer fabric by Edwin Bower Hesser, who had also photographed Jean Harlow in a similar fashion. These images have been shown in exhibitions of these artists' work.

=== Interviews and archives ===
Love periodically was interviewed by film historians, and was featured in the television documentary series The Hollywood Greats (1978) and Hollywood: A Celebration of the American Silent Film (1980), both about early filmmaking in Hollywood. She also loaned materials from her personal collection to museums. (Note: Love contributed to the exhibition 300 années de cinématographie, 60 ans de cinéma at the Musée d'Art Moderne de Paris in 1955.) In 1962, she began contributing articles about her experiences to The Christian Science Monitor. In 1977, she published an autobiography entitled From Hollywood with Love.

== See also ==
- List of actors with Academy Award nominations
- List of actors with Hollywood Walk of Fame motion picture stars
- List of caricatures at Sardi's
- List of people in Playboy 1970–1979
