= Nina Mae Fowler =

British artist (born 1981)

- Born: 1981 (age 43–44); London, England
- Education: University of Brighton (BA)
- Known for: Large scale pencil and graphite drawings
- Spouse: Craig Wylie
- Website: ninamaefowler.art

Nina Mae Fowler (born 1981) is a British artist living and working in Norfolk. She is known for her large scale pencil and graphite drawings, which are often accompanied by sculptures.

== Early life and education ==
Fowler grew up in London and attended South Hampstead High School before attending the University of Brighton, where she graduated in Sculpture in 2003. In her early 20s she worked as an archivist to the founder of Indica Gallery, John Dunbar.

== Career ==
Speaking about her work, Fowler said "Deep psychological conflict, the turbulent mix of early black and white Hollywood glamour and its attendant dark side are the focus of my work. Using imagery appropriated from films and the day-to-day lives of celebrated icons such as Elvis; Marlene Dietrich and Jean Harlow, as well as unknown figures drowned in the wake of Hollywood's dream machine".

In 2012, the University of Oxford commissioned her to depict Professor Richard Dawkins. The portrait was used by Dawkins in his book An Appetite for Wonder: The Making of a Scientist.

In 2015, a monograph of her works to date titled Nina Mae Fowler: Measuring Elvis was published by The Cob Gallery. The book features essays offering various interpretations of Fowler's work. Contributors include, former Director of London's, National Portrait Gallery, Sandy Nairne, Sienna Miller, playwright Polly Stenham and counterculture historian Barry Miles.

In April 2019, Fowler unveiled a major commission awarded to her by the National Portrait Gallery, London. Fowler's series of charcoal portraits depict nine of the UK's leading living film directors; Sir Ridley Scott, Asif Kapadia, Sally Potter, Ken Loach, Paul Greengrass, Nick Park, Sam Mendes, Joe Wright and Amma Asante. Fowler chose to capture each director whilst watching a film of importance to them. With their faces illuminated only by the light of the screen, Fowler took several stills of the directors and made preliminary sketches that formed the basis of the final pencil and charcoal drawings. Intriguingly, the director's film choice remains private between artist and sitter and not revealed to the public. The intimate scale of the works draws the viewer into the minds of the people behind the lens, conveying the inspiration felt by the directors when watching great cinema. Portraits of Film Directors by Nina Mae Fowler are now part of the museum's permanent collection and represent the institutions first contemporary drawing commission. The drawings were on public display from April 2019 until October 2019.

In 2020, a second publication titled Ruined Finery was published in Zine format by The Cob Gallery. It catalogues Fowler's subsequent drawing and sculptural works from 2015 to 2020. Featured is Fowler's 2019 commission for the National Portrait Gallery, London, accompanied by a text from cultural historian and novelist Dame Marina Warner. An essay titled Hollywood Sin features as a stand-alone insert within the zine, by poet and journalist Olivia Cole.

Fowler's work is collected by prominent figures such as John Maybury, Jude Law, Sharleen Spiteri and Caroline Issa. Her work is in the National Portrait Gallery, London.

== Recognition ==
She has been nominated for the BP Portrait Award for her painting of the ballet dancer Carlos Acosta, as well as reaching the shortlist for the Jerwood Drawing Prize in 2010 and 2015.

== Personal life ==
Fowler lives in Norfolk with her husband, the painter and BP Portrait Award winner Craig Wylie. The couple have a son and a daughter.

== Notable exhibitions ==
- Nina Mae Fowler: Selected Works, curated by James Birch (Dadiani Fine Art, 2014)
- Starke Frauen (Neuer Kunstverein Aschaffenburg, Germany, 2013)
- It's Just My Funny Way of Dancing: Parts I-XIII (Lazarides, UK, 2011)
- A Real Allegory: Parts I & II (Galerie Dukan Hourdequin, France, 2011)
