= Streets of Laredo (film) =

1949 film by Leslie Fenton

- Theatrical release poster
- Directed by: Leslie Fenton
- Screenplay by: Charles Marquis Warren
- Story by: Louis Stevens; Elizabeth Hill
- Produced by: Robert Fellows
- Starring: William Holden; Macdonald Carey; Mona Freeman; William Bendix
- Cinematography: Ray Rennahan
- Edited by: Archie Marshek
- Music by: Victor Young
- Color process: Technicolor
- Production company: Paramount Pictures
- Distributed by: Paramount Pictures
- Release date: May 11, 1949 (New York)
- Running time: 93 minutes
- Country: United States
- Language: English
- Budget: $1,472,000
- Box office: $2,150,000

Streets of Laredo is a 1949 American Western film directed by Leslie Fenton and starring William Holden, Macdonald Carey and William Bendix as three outlaws who rescue a young girl, played by Mona Freeman. When they become separated, two reluctantly become Texas Rangers, while the third continues on a life of crime.

The film is a Technicolor remake of King Vidor's black-and-white film The Texas Rangers (1936), which starred Fred MacMurray in Holden's role, Jack Oakie in William Bendix's, Lloyd Nolan in MacDonald Carey's role, and Jean Parker as the girl they rescue.

== Plot ==
A trio of outlaws, Jim Dawkins (Holden), Lorn Reming (Carey), and Reuben "Wahoo" Jones (Bendix), rob a stage. But when a young lady, Rannie Carter (Freeman), is menaced by rich and ruthless protection-racketeer Charley Calico (Alfonso Bedoya) after her uncle is killed, the robbers come to her rescue. They run him off, then pay old Pop Lint (Clem Bevans) to watch over her at his ranch.

Lorn ends up separated from his partners but continues his life of crime. Jim and Wahoo inadvertently aid some Texas Rangers and are sworn in as Rangers themselves. Lorn sees an opportunity, steals a herd of cattle the Rangers are guarding, then lets Jim and Wahoo enhance their reputation by being the ones who bring the cattle back.

Lorn's friends turn a blind eye to his activities for a while. Calico is a worse villain, burning Pop's barn and causing the old man to have a fatal heart attack. Calico assaults a Ranger as well, and is ultimately killed by Jim.

But it doesn't end there. Lorn now wants Calico's empire for himself. He also wants Rannie, who has grown to be a beautiful woman. Jim, who loves her, calls off the agreement to look the other way at Lorn's misdeeds. But he does remove a bullet when a wounded Lorn hides out at Rannie's after a holdup.

After being ordered to apprehend Lorn, Jim resigns as a Ranger, then vows revenge after Lorn kills Wahoo in cold blood. Now that Rannie can see Lorn for what he really is, she wishes Jim luck as he rides to Laredo for a showdown. The former partners face each other for the last time, then Lorn is killed by Rannie.

== Cast ==
- William Holden as Jim Dawkins
- Macdonald Carey as Lorn Reming
- Mona Freeman as Rannie Carter
- William Bendix as Wahoo Jones
- Stanley Ridges as Major Bailey
- Alfonso Bedoya as Charley Calico
- Ray Teal as Cantrell
- Clem Bevans as Pop Lint
- James Bell as Ike
- Dick Foote as Pipes
- Joe Dominguez as Francisco
- Grandon Rhodes as Phil Jessup
- Perry Ivins as Mayor Towson

== Inspiration ==
The film takes its title from the old Western ballad "The Streets of Laredo", which is frequently used as underscoring.

== Release ==
The film opened May 11, 1949 at the Paramount Theatre in New York City together with a stageshow featuring Peter Lorre, The Pied Pipers and the Victor Lombardo orchestra. It grossed $63,000 in its opening week.
