= The Turn in the Road =

1919 film directed by King Vidor

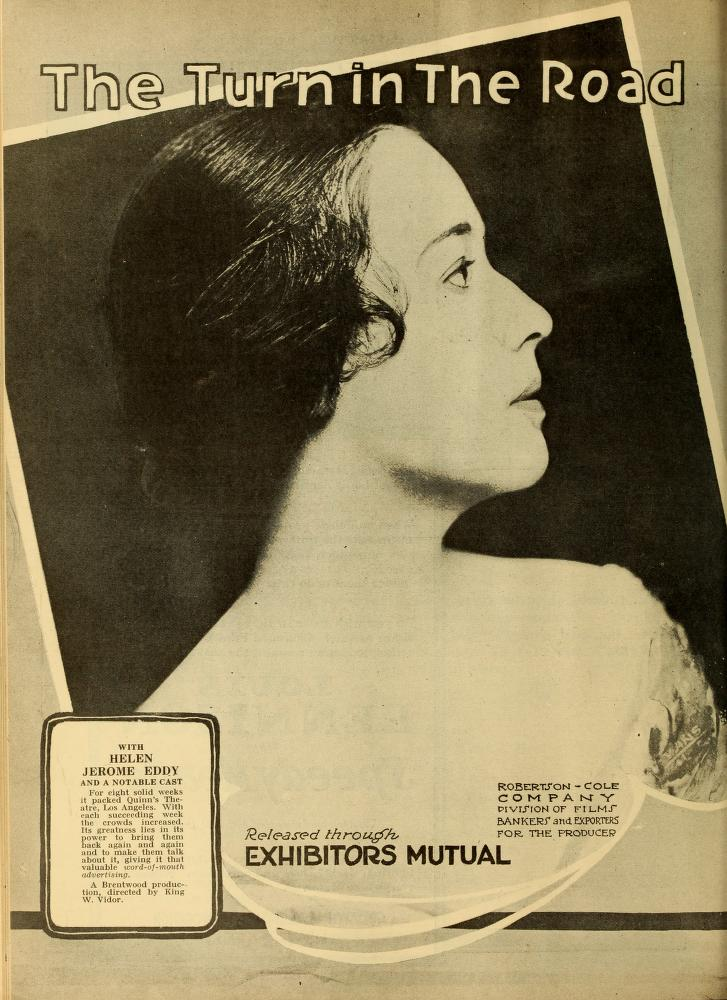
- Ad for film
- Directed by: King Vidor
- Written by: King Vidor
- Starring: George Nichols
- Distributed by: Robertson-Cole
- Release date: March 29, 1919
- Running time: 50 minutes
- Country: United States
- Language: Silent (English intertitles)

The Turn in the Road is a 1919 American silent drama film directed by King Vidor. His first feature film, the production was financed by the Brentwood Film Corporation and the title and the scenario based on a Christian Science religious tract. No print of this film is known to exist, which suggests that it is a lost film.

== Plot ==
As described in a film magazine, Paul Perry (Hughes), the son of wealthy iron manufacturer Hamilton Perry (Nichols), openly loves the younger daughter of Reverend Matthew Barker (Hall), while the older daughter, who is more practical, secretly loves him. The young couple get married, and a child is born a year later but the mother dies. Almost insane with grief, the husband reproaches the clergyman for having preached a doctrine of a God who inflicts His children with sorrow. Unable to reconcile himself with his sorrow, he leaves for the slums of Chicago and searches for the truth in connection with the purpose of God. Meanwhile, his son Bob (Alexander) is cared for by the wife's sister. Paul decides to leave Chicago on a freight train, and returns to his home town and spends the night in his father's barn. The next morning Bob, who has spent the night with his grandfather, goes out to the barn to feed some puppies and discovers the sleeping man in the hay. They talk, and Paul's sister-in-law comes to the barn and recognizes him, while Paul discovers that the child is his, resolving his quest for spiritual understanding. There is also a subplot involving a feud between the wealthy iron manufacturer and his workers.

== Cast ==
- George Nichols as Hamilton Perry
- Lloyd Hughes as Paul Perry
- Winter Hall as Reverend Matthew Barker
- Helen Jerome Eddy as Jane Barker
- Pauline Curley as Evelyn Barker
- Ben Alexander as Bob
- Charles Arling

== Production ==
In 1918 Vidor sought financing for a feature film, his first, from several physicians and dentists incorporated as "Brentwood Films". The group had funded a series of films produced by Judge Willis Brown of the Boy City Film Company in 1918. Vidor had directed ten of these two-reelers.

King Vidor describe how he broke into feature film directing in 1918:

"I wrote a script [The Turn in the Road] and sent it around... and nine doctors put up $1,000 each... and it was a success. That was the beginning. I didn't have time to go to college."

Due to budgetary constraints, Vidor made only a single print of the picture. Nonetheless, its “record-breaking run” at a Los Angeles theater drew the attention of Robertson-Cole, which purchased it for national release through Exhibitors Mutual. Impressed with the picture’s success, Brentwood Film Corporation (from the name of a Brentwood country club) financed three more features with Vidor as director: Better Times, The Other Half, and Poor Relations, all released in 1919.

The Christian Science ideals that Vidor presented in The Turn in the Road suggest his financial backers at Brentwood were at least sympathetic to its precepts.

== Theme ==
The scenario and title for the film is based on a religious tract published by Christian Scientists of whom Vidor was a lifelong adherent. Vidor's religious idealism praised the power of mind over matter and Jeffersonian Agrarianism.

Film historian John Baxter cites a contemporary review by The New York Times describing a “particularly powerful” scene contrasting the response of “a child, and a rich, powerful man” to the fury of a thunderstorm: the child reacts with curiosity and wonder at the “natural force”; the man winces at each lightning flash and peal of thunder, daunted by an element that his “money and [social] power cannot overcome.”

Film historians Raymond Durgnat and Scott Simmons report that no print of the film has been discovered by archivists: Of all of Vidor’s features, the loss of his first… is most to be regretted. From all reports it was dramatically successful and heartfelt…”
