= Elizabeth Hill (screenwriter) =

American screenwriter (1901–1978)

- Born: February 27, 1901; Cape Elizabeth, Maine, U.S.
- Died: August 21, 1978 (aged 77); Los Angeles, California, U.S.
- Occupation: Screenwriter
- Spouse: King Vidor (m. 1932)

Elizabeth Hill (February 27, 1901 – August 21, 1978) was an American screenwriter and the third wife of King Vidor.

== Biography ==
=== Origins ===
Hill was born in Cape Elizabeth, Maine. When she was 20, she married her first husband. She moved to Hollywood and gained work as a studio stenographer, and eventually made her way to a script-girl role.

=== Career ===
Hill and Vidor fell in love on the set of Bird of Paradise in 1932; at the time, Hill was divorced, but Vidor was married to actress Eleanor Boardman. Boardman secured a divorce in 1933.

In 1933, there were rumours circulating around Hollywood that Hill had disappeared, but columnist Louella Parsons investigated and found that Hill was still working as a script girl alongside Vidor. Vidor and Hill's ongoing relationship was the subject of many gossip items until the two got married in Mexico in 1937.

Hill and Vidor collaborated on several projects over the course of their relationship, including H.M. Pulham, Esq. According to a 1934 L.A. Times piece, Hill was entrusted with directing several scenes in Vidor's Our Daily Bread.

=== Divorce ===
In 1951, Hill sued Vidor for divorce on the grounds of adultery, alleging that he was having an affair with actress Mary Anderson. The high-profile divorce case was eventually settled for $300,000; Vidor had counter-filed alleging that their marriage in Mexico was illegal.

== Filmography ==
- Streets of Laredo (1949)
- H.M. Pulham, Esq. (1941)
- Northwest Passage (1940) (uncredited)
- The Citadel (1938)
- The Texas Rangers (1936)
- Our Daily Bread (1934)
