= The Texas Rangers (1936 film) =

1936 film by King Vidor

- Theatrical release poster
- Directed by: King Vidor
- Written by: King Vidor; Elizabeth Hill; Louis Stevens
- Based on: The Texas Rangers: A Century of Frontier Defense; 1935 book by Walter Prescott Webb
- Produced by: King Vidor
- Starring: Fred MacMurray; Jack Oakie; Jean Parker
- Cinematography: Edward Cronjager
- Edited by: Doane Harrison
- Music by: Gerard Carbonara (uncredited)
- Color process: Black and white
- Production company: Paramount Pictures
- Distributed by: Paramount Pictures
- Release date: August 28, 1936
- Running time: 98 minutes
- Country: United States
- Language: English

The Texas Rangers is a 1936 American Western film directed by King Vidor and starring Fred MacMurray and Jack Oakie. The picture was nominated for Best Sound Recording (Franklin Hansen) at the 9th Academy Awards. The film was inspired by incidents from Walter Prescott Webb's 1935 history book The Texas Rangers, A Century of Frontier Defense but filmed in New Mexico.

The film involves two out-of-luck Texas Rangers who must arrest an old friend turned outlaw. The supporting cast features Lloyd Nolan, Edward Ellis, Jean Parker, and George "Gabby" Hayes. In February 2020, the film was shown at the 70th Berlin International Film Festival, as part of a retrospective dedicated to King Vidor's career.

== Plot ==
Sam, Jim and "Wahoo" are outlaws with a sweet racket. Wahoo is a stagecoach driver who feeds information of routes and cargoes of stagecoaches to his outlaw confederates Sam and Jim, who rob the stage and shoot at Wahoo to prove he has nothing to do with the robberies. The three split up one night when lawmen surround their camp and they make their escape but Sam is nowhere to be found.

Wahoo and Jim continue their racket until one day a Texas Ranger rides shotgun on the couch next to Wahoo. Jim is supposed to rob the stage when the stagecoach stops to water their mules but Wahoo has a feeling about the Ranger and won't let Jim rob the stage, instead bundling a mystified Jim on board as a paying passenger. Wahoo and Jim realise their lives have been saved when the Ranger quickly kills two other robbers.

Needing money and impressed by the Ranger's reputation, Jim and Wahoo join the Rangers with the pair planning to use the position to enrich themselves. When sent to locate cattle rustlers Jim and Wahoo discover they are led by Sam who agrees that teaming up to work both ends against the middle will make all of them rich. However Wahoo and Jim begin to have second thoughts when they take on a group of hostile Indians who have murdered the family of young David whom they look after. Jim gets a strong reputation among the Rangers when he saves their company from annihilation by a large Apache war party. Jim becomes so trusted he is sent to singlehandedly arrest and prosecute a murdering town boss. Jim originally plans to install Sam as the new town boss but changes his mind and has Sam promise to leave the area.

Sam begins a reign of terror and Jim is tasked with bringing him to justice. Rather than arrest his friend, Jim attempts to resign from the Rangers. He is immediately arrested and put in jail when proof of his former association with Sam is presented to him. Wahoo sets out in Jim's place with a plan to lure Sam to the Rangers headquarters by pretending to join his gang and together spring Jim from prison. When Sam discovers the plot he kills Wahoo. Upon learning of Wahoo's death, the Rangers release Jim to go after Sam. Sam offers to leave for California but Jim insists on bringing him in. Sam refuses and is killed by Jim in a shootout. The film ends with Wahoo's funeral.

== Production ==
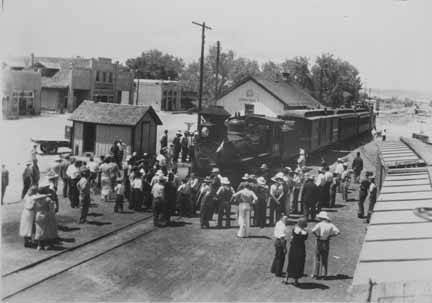
During filming in Española

The film had outdoor scenes shot in and around Española, New Mexico, along the Chili Line railroad with a Denver and Rio Grande locomotive redecorated to resemble its 1890 appearance and labelled as "Old Montezuma D&RG No. 1" for the occasion.

== Cast ==
- Fred MacMurray as Jim Hawkins
- Jack Oakie as Henry B. "Wahoo" Jones
- Jean Parker as Amanda Bailey
- Lloyd Nolan as Sam "Polka Dot" McGee
- Edward Ellis as Major Bailey
- Benny Bartlett as David
- Frank Shannon as Capt. Stafford
- Frank Cordell as Ranger Ditson
- Richard Carle as Casper Johnson
- Jed Prouty as District Attorney Dave Twitchell
- Fred Kohler as Jess Higgens
- Charles Middleton as Higgins's lawyer
- George "Gabby" Hayes as Judge Snow

== Reception ==
Writing for The Spectator in 1936, Graham Greene gave the film a neutral review. While favorably comparing King Vidor's direction to D. W. Griffith, Greene noted that "the story gets in the way" effectively reducing the epic quality of the drama.

The film was followed by a sequel in 1940 called The Texas Rangers Ride Again with a new cast. The film was also remade in 1949 as Streets of Laredo.

== See also ==
- List of American films of 1936
