= Hurricane in Galveston =

1913 film directed by King Vidor

- Directed by: King Vidor
- Release date: 1913
- Country: United States
- Language: Silent with English intertitles

Hurricane in Galveston is a 1913 American short documentary directed by King Vidor. It was Vidor's debut film as a director.

== Production ==
King Vidor and Ray Clough produced and photographed the film using a homemade camera borrowed from a friend. The commercial release was limited to the state of Texas. Hurricane in Galveston is a lost film.
