= Our Daily Bread (1934 film) =

1934 film by King Vidor

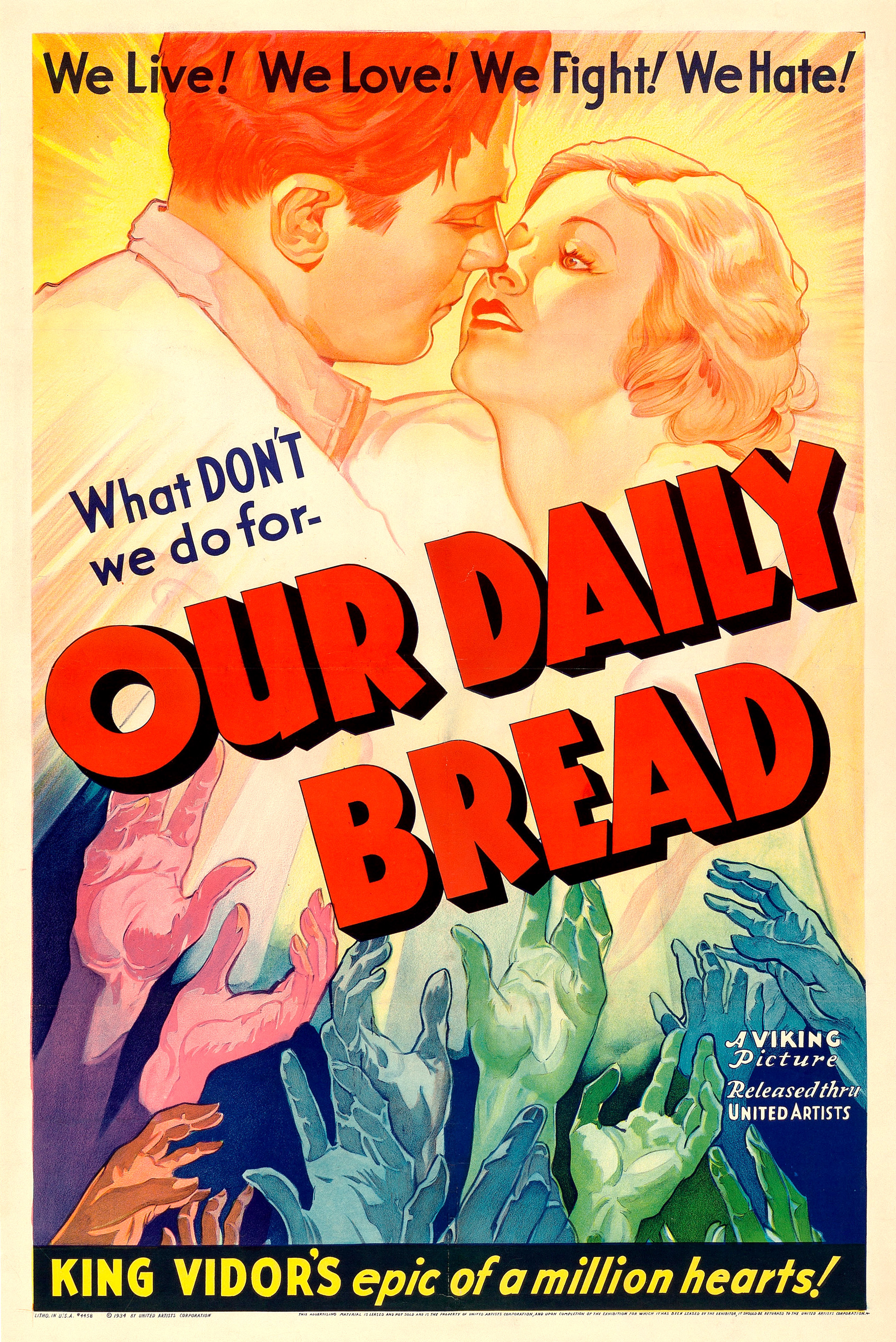
- Theatrical release poster
- Directed by: King Vidor
- Written by: King Vidor (story); Elizabeth Hill (scenario); Joseph L. Mankiewicz (dialogue)
- Produced by: King Vidor
- Starring: Karen Morley; Tom Keene; Barbara Pepper
- Cinematography: Robert H. Planck
- Edited by: Lloyd Nosler
- Music by: Alfred Newman
- Production company: Viking Productions
- Distributed by: United Artists
- Release dates: August 1, 1934 (U.S. premiere); October 2, 1934 (U.S. wide)
- Running time: 80 minutes
- Country: United States
- Language: English
- Budget: $125,000 (estimate)

Our Daily Bread is a 1934 American drama film directed by King Vidor and starring Karen Morley, Tom Keene, and John Qualen. The film is a sequel to Vidor's silent classic The Crowd (1928), using the same characters although with different actors.

== Plot ==
A couple, down on their luck during the Great Depression, moves to a farm to try to make a go of living off the land. They have no idea what to do at first, but soon find other downtrodden people to help them. Soon, they have a collective of people, some from the big city, who work together on a farm. A severe drought is killing the crops. The people then dig a ditch by hand, almost two miles long, to divert water from a creek to irrigate the crops.

== Production ==
Vidor tried to interest Irving Thalberg of MGM in the project, but Thalberg, who had greenlighted the earlier film, rejected the idea. Vidor then produced the film himself and released it through United Artists. The film is also known as Hell's Crossroads, an American reissue title.

== Cast ==
- Karen Morley as Mary Sims
- Tom Keene as John Sims
- Barbara Pepper as Sally
- Addison Richards as Louie Fuente
- John Qualen as Chris Larsen
- Lloyd Ingraham as Uncle Anthony
- Sidney Bracey as Rent Collector
- Henry Hall as Frank
- Nellie V. Nichols as Mrs. Cohen
- Frank Minor as Plumber
- Bud Rae as Stonemason
- Harry Brown as Little Man

== Reception and legacy ==
Our Daily Bread was a box-office disappointment. Vidor, who produced the film with his own money, said he "just about broke even."

The New York Times called the film "a social document of amazing vitality and emotional impact."

In 2015, the United States Library of Congress selected the film for preservation in the National Film Registry, finding it "culturally, historically, or aesthetically significant". In February 2020, the film was shown at the 70th Berlin International Film Festival, as part of a retrospective dedicated to Vidor's career.

== Soundtrack ==
- Sidney Bracey – "Just Because You're You"
- The farmers – "You're in the Army Now"
- Musicians at the farm – "Camptown Races" (music by Stephen Foster)
- Tom Keene – "Oh! Susanna" with modified lyrics (music and lyrics by Stephen Foster)
