= H. M. Pulham, Esq. =

1941 film by King Vidor

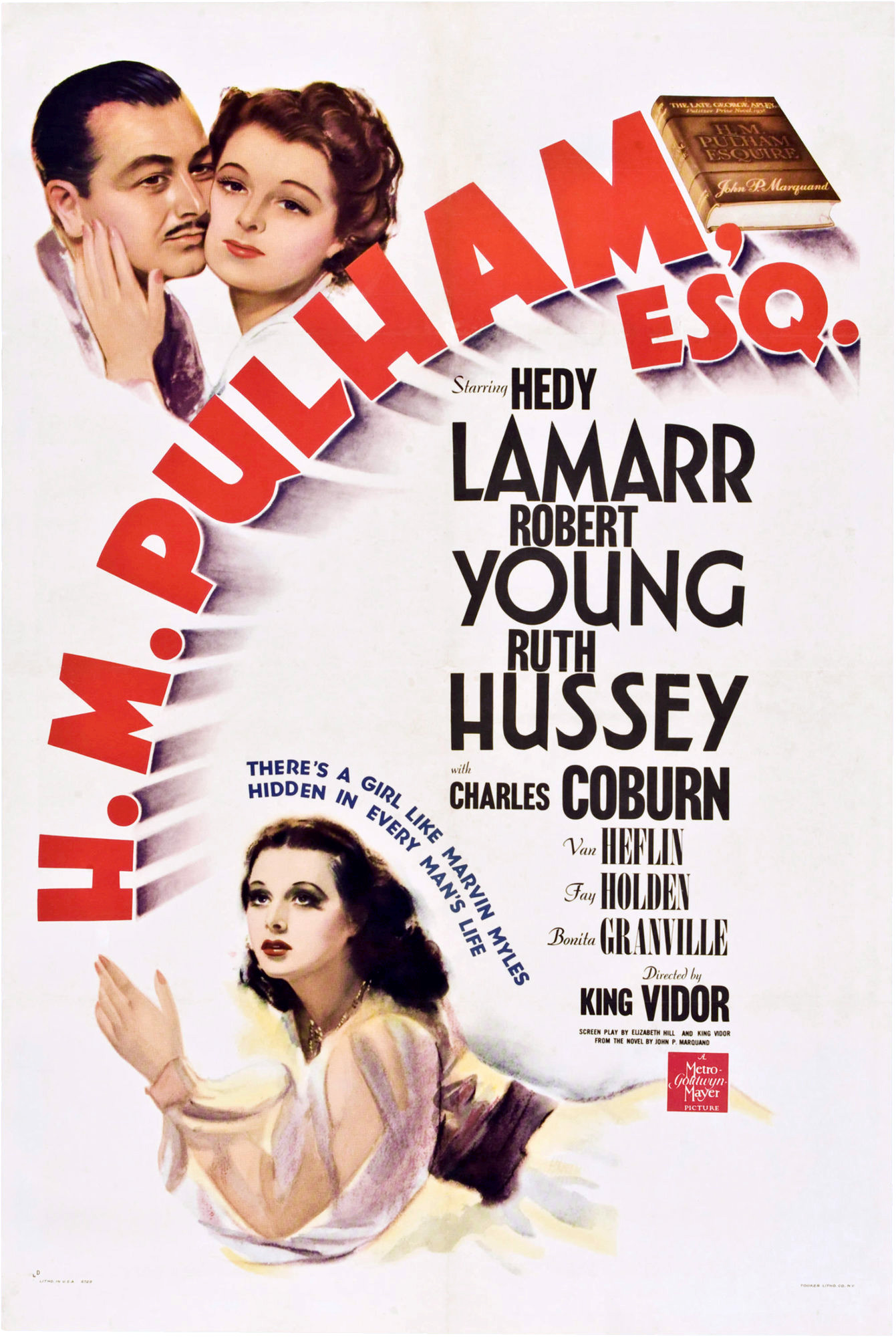
- Theatrical Film Poster
- Directed by: King Vidor
- Screenplay by: King Vidor; Elizabeth Hill Vidor
- Based on: H. M. Pulham, Esq. 1941 novel by John P. Marquand
- Produced by: King Vidor
- Starring: Hedy Lamarr; Robert Young; Ruth Hussey; Charles Coburn
- Cinematography: Ray June
- Edited by: Harold Kress
- Music by: Bronislau Kaper
- Production company: Metro-Goldwyn-Mayer
- Distributed by: Loew's Inc.
- Release date: December 18, 1941 (USA)
- Running time: 120 minutes
- Country: United States
- Language: English

H. M. Pulham, Esq. is a 1941 American drama film directed by King Vidor and starring Hedy Lamarr, Robert Young, and Ruth Hussey. Based on the novel H. M. Pulham, Esq. by John P. Marquand, the film is about a middle-aged businessman who has lived a conservative life according to the routine conventions of society, but who still remembers the beautiful young woman who once brought him out of his shell. Vidor co-wrote the screenplay with his wife, Elizabeth Hill Vidor. The film features an early uncredited appearance by Ava Gardner. In February 2020, the film was shown at the 70th Berlin International Film Festival, as part of a retrospective dedicated to King Vidor's career.

== Plot ==
Harry Moulton Pulham Jr. (Robert Young) is a conservative, middle-aged Boston businessman, set in a precise daily routine. He has a proper wife, Kay (Ruth Hussey), with whom he has settled into a comfortable if passionless relationship. However, it was not always that way.

When Harry is saddled with the task of organizing a twenty-five-year college reunion, it triggers a flashback to a time more than twenty years earlier. After the end of World War I, his Harvard classmate and friend Bill King (Van Heflin) gets him a job in a New York City advertising company, where he falls in love with a vivacious, independent coworker oddly named Marvin Myles (Hedy Lamarr). However, though they love each other, she cannot bring herself to fit into his traditional idea of a wife's role and he cannot imagine living anywhere other than hidebound Boston. So they break off their relationship. Harry falls in love with and marries a woman from his own social set with the same attitudes and assumptions, someone approved of by his father (Charles Coburn) and mother (Fay Holden).

Harry is now profoundly dissatisfied with his dull routine. At breakfast, he begs his wife to go away with him immediately, to rekindle their love. She dismisses the idea as impractical and even silly. Harry calls Marvin and arranges to meet her again after these twenty years. He visits her apartment in the city. There are sparks, and Harry is tempted to have an affair. When she takes a phone call, we realize she, too, is married. They both realize they cannot recapture the past.

On the street after his lunch with Marvin, Harry sees his wife in the car trying to get his attention. She tells him she wants to go away with him as he suggested that morning, and he now says it is impractical, but she has canceled her appointments and packed their bags in the car and persuades him to go. He seems happy.

== Cast ==
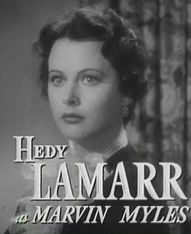
Lamarr plays both a single and married woman in the film

- Hedy Lamarr as Marvin Myles Ransome
- Robert Young as Harry Moulton Pulham
- Ruth Hussey as Cordelia 'Kay' Motford Pulham
- Charles Coburn as John Pulham
- Van Heflin as Bill King
- Fay Holden as Mrs. John Pulham
- Bonita Granville as Mary Pulham
- Douglas Wood as Mr. 'J. T.' Bullard
- Charles Halton as Walter Kaufman
- Leif Erickson as Rodney 'Bo-Jo' Brown
- Phil Brown as Joe Bingham
- David Clyde as Hugh, the butler
- Sara Haden as Miss Rollo, Harry's secretary
- Ava Gardner as Young Socialite (uncredited)
- Anne Revere as John's Secretary, Miss Redfern (uncredited)

== Production notes ==
- Production Dates: 30 July-30 September 1941
- John P. Marquand's novel was serialized as Gone Tomorrow in McCall's magazine (September 1940-January 1941). It sold over 200,000 copies within the first six months of publication.
- Most reviews singled out the performance of Hedy Lamarr and called it the best of her career.
- Modern sources include Ava Gardner in the cast, but she was not identifiable in the viewed print. A Hollywood Reporter news item on August 1, 1941, noted that Gardner, "a model," had just been signed by M-G-M. If she did appear as an extra in H. M. Pulham, Esq., it may have been her debut film.

== Director's Essay ==
As the film opened, Vidor described his thoughts and aims in bringing the story to the screen:

Here was American life today told in terms of American humor, romance and a generous sprinkling of our home-grown satire. In addition, the story covered a span of more than 30 years, and I saw a chance to present a sort of American cavalcade of the significant events of this century while telling the human story of an American gentleman.

The book is written in the first person. It was all told from Harry Pulham's viewpoint. This is responsible for much of the deep human psychology of the novel. Here was a challenge. Could a motion picture be told completely in the first person? It would mean that nothing could happen in the entire picture unless it was seen or witnessed or experienced by Pulham. We decided to try it. The result is that in the picture nothing happens that is not experienced by Pulham.

So Robert Young is in every scene of the picture or is in the room when every scene happens. In the case of telephone conversations, no one is shown at the other end of the line. We only hear what Pulham hears. We do not see the other person at any time, for this would be letting the audience see something that Harry Pulham didn't see.
