= The Crowd (1928 film) =

1928 film directed by King Vidor

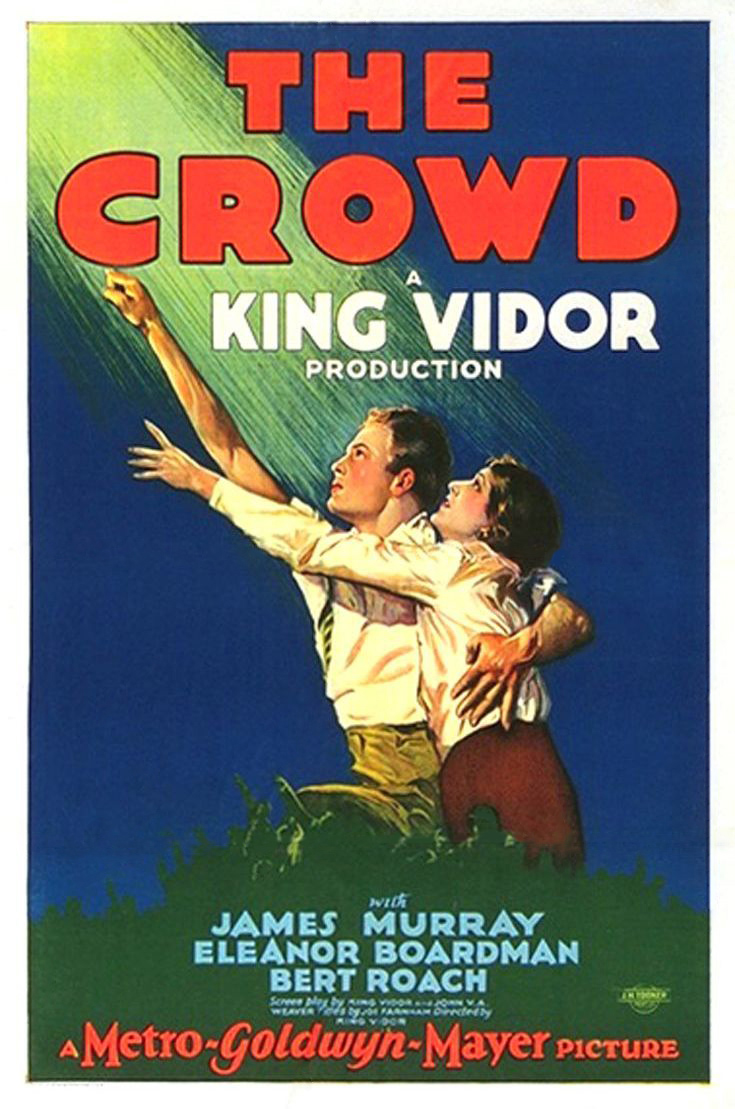
- Theatrical release poster
- Directed by: King Vidor
- Written by: Joseph Farnham (titles)
- Screenplay by: King Vidor; John V.A. Weaver
- Story by: King Vidor; Harry Behn (uncredited)
- Produced by: Irving Thalberg
- Starring: James Murray; Eleanor Boardman; Bert Roach
- Cinematography: Henry Sharp
- Edited by: Hugh Wynn
- Production company: Metro-Goldwyn-Mayer
- Distributed by: Metro-Goldwyn-Mayer
- Release dates: February 28, 1928 (NYC); March 3, 1928 (US)
- Running time: 98 minutes
- Country: United States
- Language: Silent (English intertitles)

The Crowd is a 1928 American silent drama film directed by King Vidor and starring James Murray, Eleanor Boardman and Bert Roach. The feature film was nominated at the first Academy Award presentation in 1929 for several awards, including Unique and Artistic Production for MGM and Best Director for Vidor. The film is widely regarded by critics and historians as one of the greatest films ever made and a landmark of silent-era cinema.

Kevin Brownlow and David Gill restored The Crowd in 1981, and it was released with a score by Carl Davis. In 1989, the film was one of the first 25 selected by the Library of Congress for preservation in the United States National Film Registry for being "culturally, historically, or aesthetically significant". In February 2020, the film was shown at the 70th Berlin International Film Festival, as part of a retrospective dedicated to Vidor's career.

The film entered the public domain in the United States in 2024.

== Plot ==
The Crowd (1928) by King Vidor

Born on the Fourth of July, 1900, John Sims loses his father when he is twelve. At 21, he sets out for New York City, where he is sure he will become somebody important, just as his father had always believed. Another boat passenger tells him he will have to be good in order to stand out from the crowd.

John gets a job as one of many office workers of the Atlas Insurance Company. Fellow employee Bert talks him into a double date to Coney Island. John is so smitten with Mary, he proposes to her at the end of the date; she accepts. Bert predicts the marriage will last a year or two.

A Christmas Eve dinner in their tiny apartment with Mary's mother and two brothers, with whom John is not on friendly terms, ends badly. John goes to Bert's to get some liquor. A young woman there throws herself at him, complimenting him on his looks, and starts to dance with him. John returns home very late and very drunk. Mary's family has gone home, and she tells him that they do not understand him. They exchange Christmas gifts and John compliments her, but yells at her when she does something trivial.

In April, they quarrel and Mary threatens to leave, and is shocked and hurt by John's apathy when he does not try to stop her. The couple reconciles when Mary tells John that she is pregnant. She gives birth to a son. Over the next five years, the couple have a daughter and an $8 raise, but Mary is dissatisfied with John's lack of advancement, especially compared to Bert, and in light of John's big talk about his prospects.

Finally, John wins $500 for an advertising slogan; and buys presents for his family. When he and Mary urge their children to rush home to see their gifts, their daughter is killed by a truck. John is so overcome with grief, he cannot function at work. When reprimanded, he quits.

John gets other jobs, but cannot hold onto any of them. Mary's brothers reluctantly offer him a position, but John is too proud to accept what he deems a "charity job". In a fit of rage, Mary slaps him. John goes for a walk, contemplates suicide, but his son goes with him. The child's unconditional love for him makes him rethink his situation, and he changes his mind. John gets work as a sandwich board carrier and returns home, his optimism renewed, only to find Mary about to leave with her brothers. She steps out of the house, but no further. She loves John too much to abandon him. The reconciled family attends a vaudeville comedy show, with the final shot showing them overcome with laughter, and lost in the crowded audience of laughing people.

== Cast ==
- Eleanor Boardman as Mary Sims
- James Murray as John Sims
- Bert Roach as Bert
- Estelle Clark as Jane
- Daniel G. Tomlinson as Jim
- Dell Henderson as Dick
- Lucy Beaumont as Mary's mother
- Freddie Burke Frederick as "Junior"
- Alice Mildred Puter as daughter

== Production ==
The Crowd was conceived by director King Vidor and filmed after the success of his previous film, the critically acclaimed box office success The Big Parade. Vidor wanted the new film to be innovative in its story, acting, and cinematography. The film mixes striking visual styles and moving camera cinematography – as well as hidden cameras in some of the New York City scenes, and subtle use of scale models and dissolves – influenced by 1920s German cinema and F.W. Murnau in particular, with intense, intimate scenes of the family's struggle. Vidor avoided casting big-name stars in the film to attain greater authenticity; Murray had started as a studio extra, and had appeared in featured roles already, but had made his way to California riding boxcars and doing odd jobs such as shoveling coal and washing dishes. For his female lead, Vidor selected Eleanor Boardman, an MGM contract actress and also Vidor's second wife.

Vidor's great financial success at MGM in the 1920s allowed him to sell the unusual scenario to production head Irving Thalberg as an experimental film. MGM chief Louis B. Mayer reportedly disliked the film for its bleak subject matter and lack of a happy ending, and the studio held the film from release for almost a year. At the studio's insistence, seven alternate upbeat endings were filmed, according to Vidor's autobiography, and previewed in small towns. The film was finally released with two endings, one Vidor's original ending, and another with the family gathered around a Christmas tree after John has gotten a job with an advertising agency. Exhibitors could choose which version to show, but, at least according to Vidor, the happy ending was rarely shown.

== Murray and Vidor in later years ==
James Murray succumbed to alcoholism and became a "Skid Row bum." When Vidor saw him on the street, panhandling, he offered Murray a part in his upcoming film Our Daily Bread, but Murray angrily refused, saying "Just because I stop you on the street and try to borrow a buck, you think you can tell me what to do. As far as I am concerned, you know what you can do with your lousy part." In 1936, his body was found in the Hudson River, a possible suicide. Vidor was haunted by Murray's death, and in 1979 attempted to raise funds to film The Actor, a screenplay he had written based on Murray's story, but the film was never made.

== Critical reception and influence ==
The Crowd was a modest financial and critical success upon its initial release. Mordaunt Hall, a reviewer for The New York Times in 1928, called it "substantial and worthy" and "a powerful analysis of a young couple's struggle for existence in this city"; but the trade publication Variety disagreed and described the film as "a drab actionless story of ungodly length and apparently telling nothing."

Since then, The Crowd has been hailed by film critics as one of the greatest, most enduring silent films in American cinematic history. French director Jean-Luc Godard, when asked in the 1960s why more films were not made about ordinary people, he responded, "The Crowd had already been made, so why remake it?" Yet, at the time of its release, just before the start of the Great Depression, audiences were already seeking escapist entertainment over the realism portrayed in The Crowd, a stark realism that filmmakers would not embrace again until after World War II. The film, however, proved to be popular enough during the months after its distribution in 1928 that it grossed twice its production costs. The arrival of sound films at the same time combined to radically change filmmaking. Due to the limitations imposed by early sound-filming techniques, The Crowd's innovations in camera movement would not be equaled for another decade.

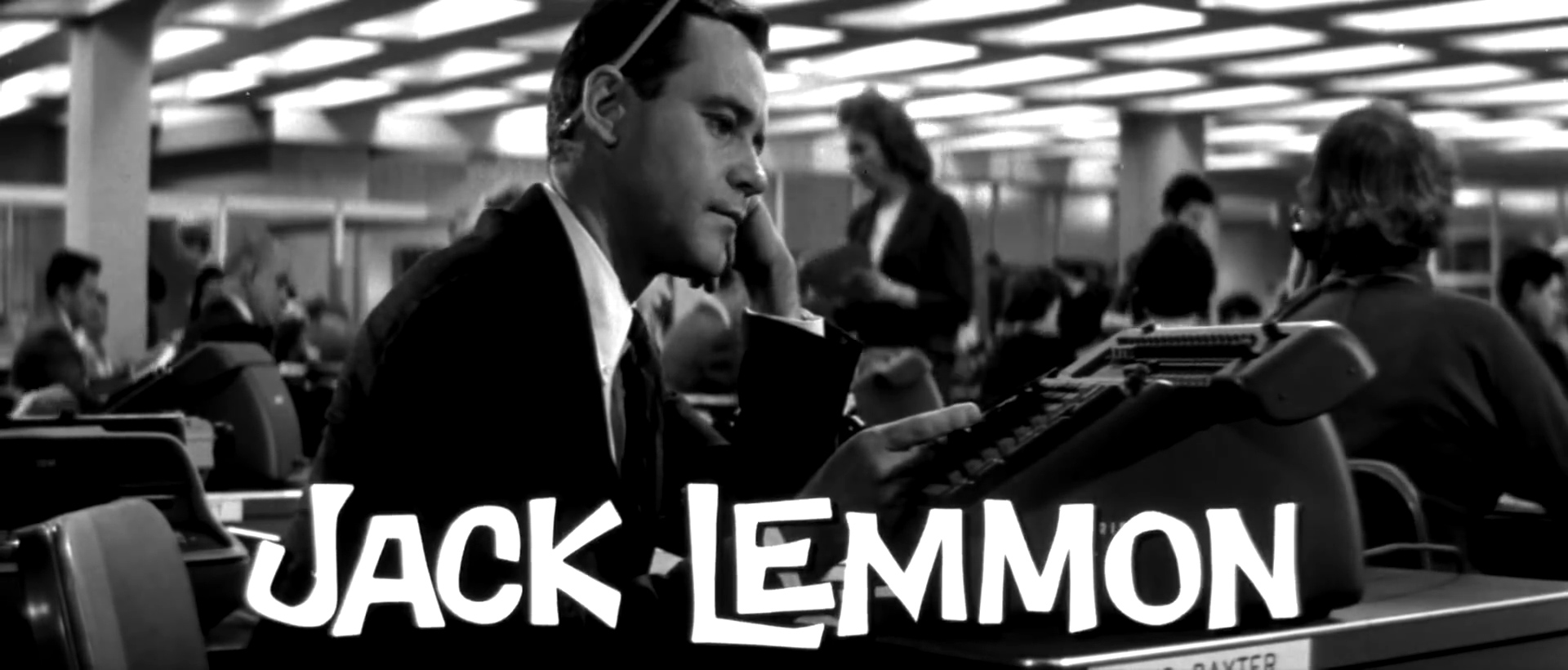
The introduction of Jack Lemmon's character in Billy Wilder's The Apartment is inspired by the sequence that moves the camera towards Sims's desk.

Vidor used the John and Mary Sims characters again, with different actors, in his 1934 film Our Daily Bread. He also provided an insightful interview on the making of the film in a segment of the British documentary series Hollywood (1980).

== Awards and honors ==
Nominations

- Academy Award for Best Unique and Artistic Production – Irving Thalberg for MGM
- Academy Award for Best Director, Dramatic Picture – King Vidor

== Soundtrack ==
Composer Carl Davis created an orchestral score for the film in 1981, and it was released on video in conjunction with MGM and British television Thames Silents series in the late 1980s.

== Home media ==
The Crowd was released on VHS as part of the MGM Silent Classics series in the 1980s, with a new score by Carl Davis. It was also released as part of a double-bill LaserDisc package with The Wind.

In October 2026, Flicker Alley announceed a Blu-ray release of the film; featuring a brand-new restoration from Blackhawk Films with three musical scores, which is scheduled for December 8.
