= Louis Stevens (writer) =

American screenwriter

- Born: December 25, 1896; Riga, Latvia
- Died: September 29, 1963 (aged 66); Hollywood, California, United States
- Occupation: Screenwriter
- Years active: 1920–58

Louis Stevens (December 25, 1896 – September 29, 1963) was an American screenwriter of the silent and sound film eras. Born on Christmas Day 1896 in Riga, Governorate of Livonia, Russian Empire, Stevens entered the film industry in 1920 when he co-wrote the silent film A World of Folly, with Jane Grogan. In his over 30-year career he worked on over 40 screenplays, as well as several film shorts and two television series. Among his more notable films were: contributing to the script of the 1931 version of Dracula, starring Bela Lugosi; co-writing the story for What Price Hollywood? (1932); the screenplay for the 1940 western, Colorado, directed by Joseph Kane, and starring Roy Rogers; the story for Streets of Laredo (1949), starring William Holden, Macdonald Carey and William Bendix; 1951's The Cimarron Kid, starring Audie Murphy; and Horizons West (1952), starring Robert Ryan, Julie Adams, and Rock Hudson. Stevens' final screenplay was for Flaming Frontier in 1958, although he did some work on additional dialogue for the 1959 film, Desert Desperadoes. Stevens also wrote several television episodes, one for Cheyenne, and two for Hawkeye and the Last of the Mohicans, all in 1957.

Stevens died on September 29, 1963, at the age of 66, in Hollywood, California.

== Filmography ==
(Per AFI database)

- A World of Folly, screenplay (1920)
- The Bronze Bell, screenplay (1921)
- The Home Stretch, screenplay (1921)
- Dollar Devils, screenplay (1923)
- The Ne'er-Do-Well, screenplay (1923)
- Babe Comes Home, screenplay (1927)
- Easy Pickings, screenplay (1927)
- United States Smith, scenario (1928)
- Burning Daylight, screenplay (1928)
- Hell Ship Bronson, screenplay (1928)
- Hot Stuff, scenario (1929)
- Scarlet Seas, titles (1929)
- Heads Up, continuity (1930)
- Dracula, screenplay (1932)
- Girl of the Rio, screenplay (1932)
- Men of Chance, screenplay (1932)
- State's Attorney, story (1932)
- What Price Hollywood?, story (1932)
- Flying Devils, story & screenplay (1933)
- Gridiron Flash (1934)
- Hot Tip (1935)
- Mary Burns, Fugitive, continuity (1935)
- The Texas Rangers, screenplay (1936)
- Special Investigator, screenplay (1936)
- Criminal Lawyer, story (1937)
- The Last Train from Madrid, screenplay (1937)
- Sinners in Paradise, screenplay (1938)
- The Border Legion, screenplay (1940)
- Colorado, screenplay (1940)
- Amazon Quest, dialogue (1949)
- Massacre River, screenplay (1949)
- Streets of Laredo, story (1949)
- Santa Fe, story (1951)
- The Cimarron Kid, story & screenplay (1952)
- Horizons West, story & screenplay (1952)
- Border River, story & screenplay (1954)
- Gun Duel in Durango, screenplay (1957)
- The Beast of Budapest, story (1958)
- Wolf Dog, screenplay (1958)
- Flaming Frontier, screenplay (1958)
- Desert Desperadoes, dialogue (1959)
