= Better Times (film) =

1919 film directed by King Vidor

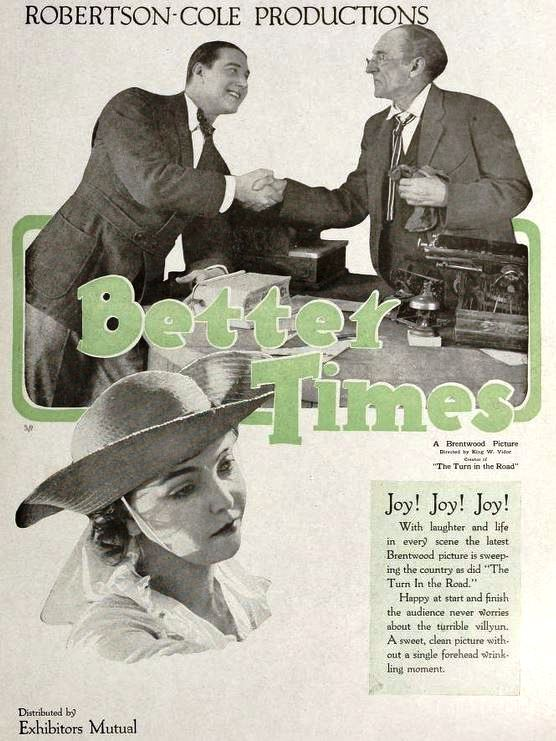
- Ad for film
- Directed by: King Vidor
- Written by: King Vidor
- Starring: ZaSu Pitts
- Cinematography: William Thornley
- Distributed by: Robertson-Cole
- Release date: July 13, 1919
- Running time: 50 minutes
- Country: United States
- Language: Silent (English intertitles)

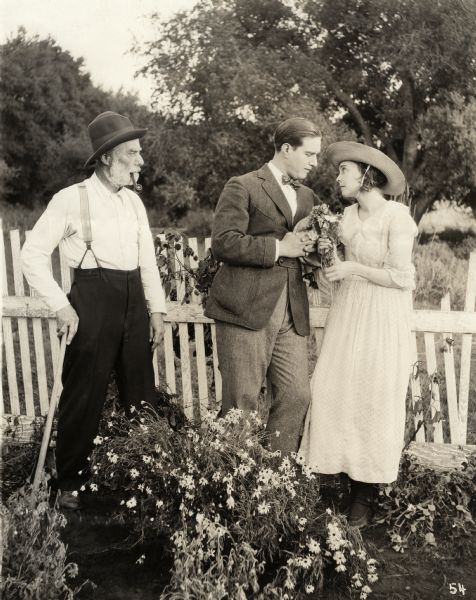
David Butler and Zasu Pitts look lovingly at each other while Jack McDonald glares in a still from the film

Better Times is a 1919 American silent comedy film directed by King Vidor. A print survives in the Filmmuseum Nederlands. Produced by the Brentwood Corporation, the film stars the then unknown ZaSu Pitts in an early screen appearance.

The picture is the second of four Christian Science “preachment” films that represent a brief phase in Vidor’s output, championing the superiority of self-healing through moral strength, supplemented by the benefits of rural living.

== Plot ==
As described in a film magazine, the plot of the film is as follows. A western Pennsylvania town has two hotels that have seen better days. Nancy Scroggs is the neglected daughter of Ezra Scroggs, who is the chief reason no one visits his hotel, the Lakeview. A gambler and procrastinator, he has succeeded in diverting trade from himself to Si Whittaker, proprietor of the Majestic.

Nancy, finally spurred into action by lines printed on a calendar, takes an ancient automobile used in the hotel's glory days and takes a stand at the train depot. Her one and only passenger is Spike Macauley, champion pinch hitter for a baseball team, who partly for pity and partly for a lark accompanies the girl. Through Spike's advertisement of the culinary department among the summer boarders of the Majestic, the later's guests are soon transferred to Nancy's care. A sudden telegram causes Spike to leave for the city, which leaves Nancy, who believes he has gone to see his sweetheart, sad.

In the days that follow, tragedy hits when Ezra gambles away his life savings and the hotel and then commits suicide. Nancy, using the insurance money from her father, goes to boarding school. While there she writes pretend love letters to herself from a famous ball player whom she only knows as Peter, make believing to have a sweetheart. This leads to a distressing situation, not anticipated by Nancy, when she is entertained at a box party at a ball game with expectations that she will meet her "lover." However, when she looks and sees that Peter and Spike are one and the same, and jumps onto the field with joy.

== Cast ==
- ZaSu Pitts as Nancy Scroggs
- David Butler as Peter Van Alstyne
- Jack McDonald as Ezra Scroggs
- William De Vaull as Si Whittaker (as William De Vaulle)
- Hugh Fay as Jack Ransom
- George Hackathorne as Tony
- Julanne Johnston (as Julianne Johnstone)

== Production ==
With the cooperation of the manager of the Chicago Cubs, Fred Mitchell, and business manager of the Los Angeles Baseball Club, Jim Morley, King Vidor shot several scenes of the Angels vs. Cubs game at Washington Park. The school scenes were shot in Oak Knoll, Pasadena, with the help of a "Mr. Wallenstein," who lent the use of his winter home for the picture. When King Vidor could not find a suitable lake for filming, a lake was constructed near the Brentwood Studios.

== Reception ==
Variety's review was mostly positive, calling it an "excellent little comedy of its kind."

Moving Picture World reviewer Margaret I. MacDonald gave the film a positive review, noting the exceptional performance of newcomer ZaSu Pitts, saying "Her work in 'Better Times' entitles her to rapid screen advancement."

== Gallery ==
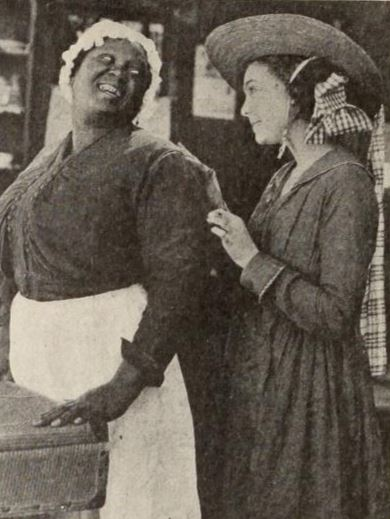
ZaSu Pitts and Unidentified Actress

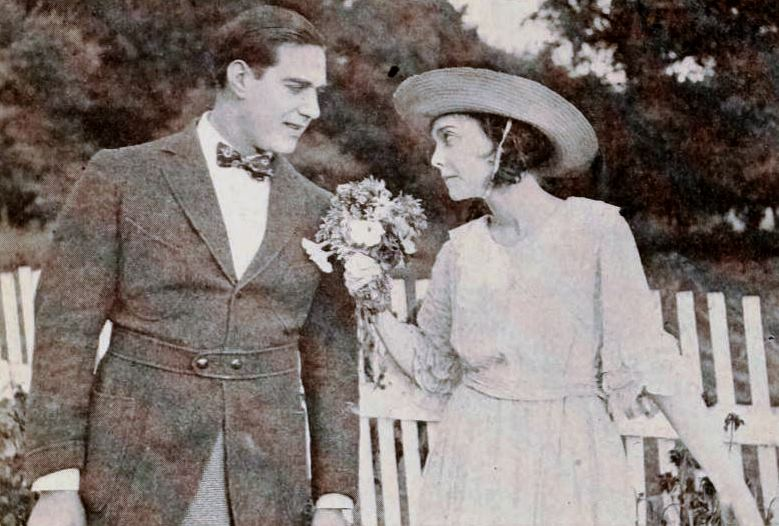
David Butler and ZaSu Pitts

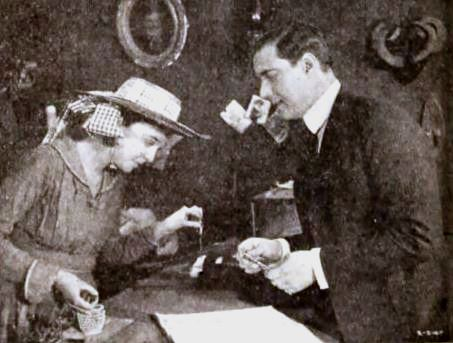
ZaSu Pitts and David Butler

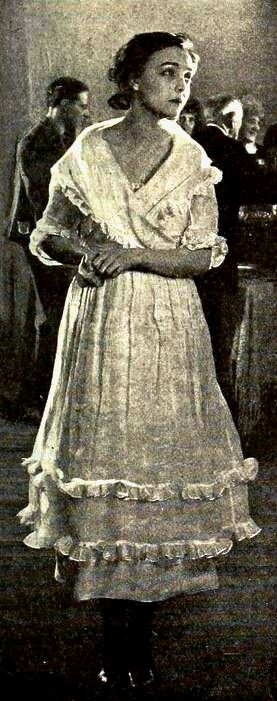
ZaSu Pitts

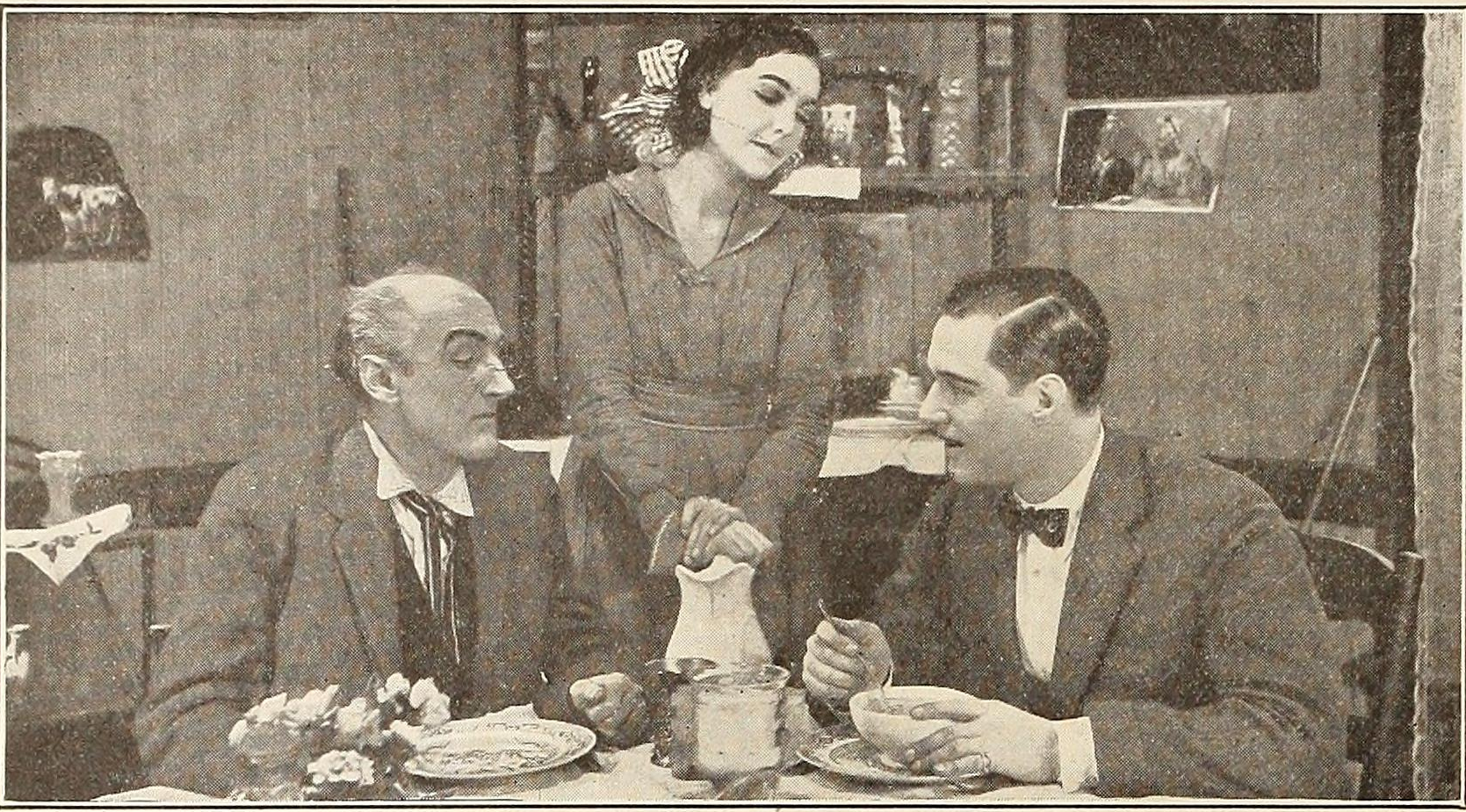
Jack McDonald, ZaSu Pitts, and ???

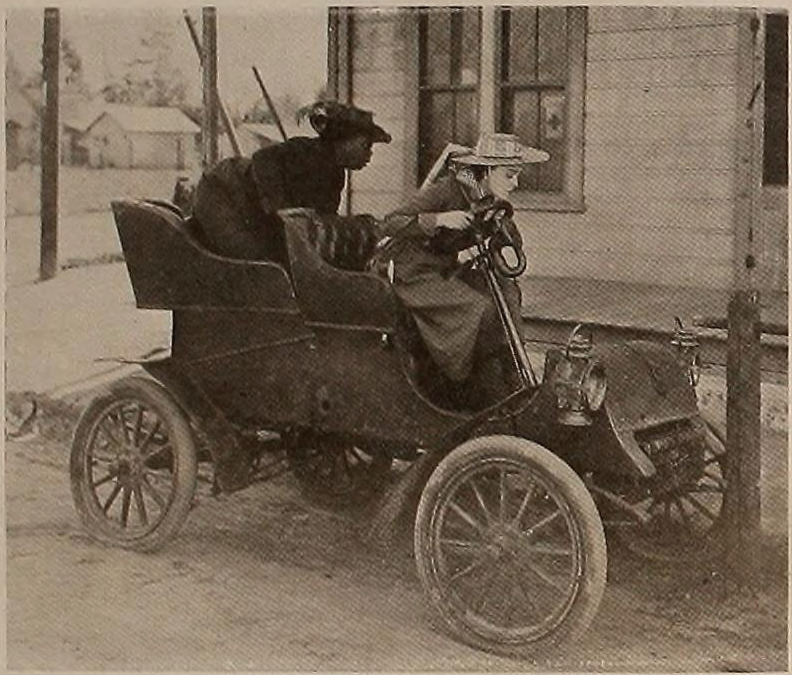
ZaSu Pitts with an Unidentified Actress
