= King Vidor =

American writer and director (1894–1982)

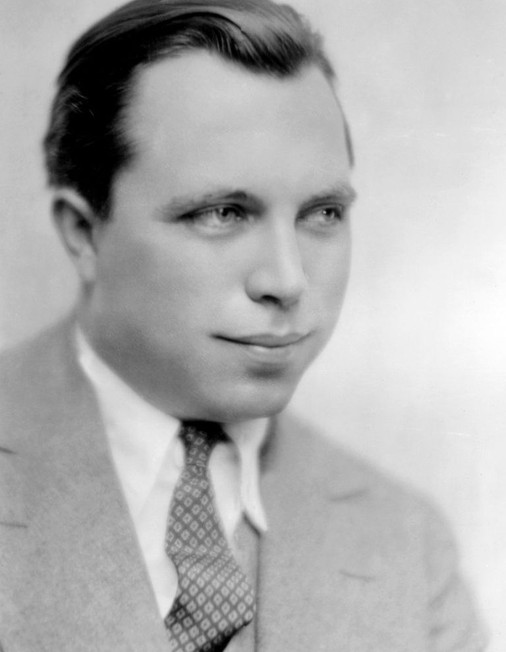
- Vidor in 1925
- Born: King Wallis Vidor; February 8, 1894; Galveston, Texas, U.S.
- Died: November 1, 1982 (aged 88); Paso Robles, California, U.S.
- Other names: King W. Vidor, John Vidor
- Occupations: Film director; producer; screenwriter
- Years active: 1913–1980
- Known for: The Big Parade; Northwest Passage; Comrade X; An American Romance; Duel in the Sun
- Spouses: Florence Arto (m. 1915; div. 1924) Eleanor Boardman (m. 1926; div. 1931) Elizabeth Hill (m. 1932; died 1978)
- Children: 2
- Awards: Hollywood Walk of Fame

King Wallis Vidor (/ˈviːdɔːr/ VEE-dor; February 8, 1894 – November 1, 1982) was an American film director, film producer, and screenwriter. His 67-year career spanned the silent and sound eras, with works distinguished by a sympathetic depiction of contemporary social issues. Considered an auteur director, Vidor approached multiple genres and allowed the subject matter to determine the style, often pressing the limits of film-making conventions.

His most acclaimed and successful film in the silent era was The Big Parade (1925). Vidor's sound films of the 1940s and early 1950s, such as Northwest Passage (1940), Comrade X (1940), An American Romance (1944), and The Fountainhead (1949), have been characterized as some of his best. His dramatic depictions of the American western landscape endow nature with a sinister force where his characters struggle for survival and redemption. Vidor's earlier films tend to identify with the common people in a collective struggle, whereas his later works place individualists at the center of his narratives.

He was considered an "actors' director"; many of his players received Academy Award nominations or awards, among them Wallace Beery, Robert Donat, Barbara Stanwyck, Jennifer Jones, Anne Shirley, and Lillian Gish. Vidor was nominated five times by the Academy Awards for Best Director. In 1979, he was awarded an Honorary Academy Award for his "incomparable achievements as a cinematic creator and innovator." Additionally, he won eight national and international film awards during his career, including the Screen Directors Guild Lifetime Achievement Award in 1957. In 1962, he was head of the jury at the 12th Berlin International Film Festival. In 1969, he was a member of the jury at the 6th Moscow International Film Festival.

== Early life and career ==
Vidor was born into a well-to-do family in Galveston, Texas, the son of Kate (née Wallis) and Charles Shelton Vidor, a lumber importer and mill owner. His paternal grandfather, Károly Vidor, was a refugee of the Hungarian Revolution of 1848. He adopted the Americanized name "Charles" when he settled in Galveston in the early 1850s and fought for the Confederacy during the American Civil War. Vidor's mother, Kate Wallis, was of Scotch-English descent and was a relative of the second wife of frontiersman and politician Davy Crockett. "King" was his given name, not a sobriquet, and honored his mother's favorite brother, King Wallis.

At the age of six, Vidor witnessed the devastation of the Galveston Hurricane of 1900. He published a historical memoir of the disaster titled "Southern Storm" for the May 1935 issue of Esquire magazine. In an interview with the Directors Guild of America (DGA) in 1980 Vidor recalled the hurricane's aftermath:

All the wooden structures of the town were flattened ... [t]he streets were piled high with dead people, and I took the first tugboat out. On the boat I went up into the bow and saw that the bay was filled with dead bodies, horses, animals, people, everything.

Near the end of production for Metro-Goldwyn-Mayer's The Wizard of Oz, Vidor was called in to direct the remaining scenes set in Kansas. His contributions include the cyclone sequence and the musical number "Over the Rainbow."

Vidor was introduced to Mary Baker Eddy's Christian Science by his mother at a very early age. Vidor would endow his films with the moral precepts of the faith, a "blend of pragmatic self-help and religious mysticism."

Vidor attended grade school at the Peacock Military Academy, located in San Antonio, Texas.

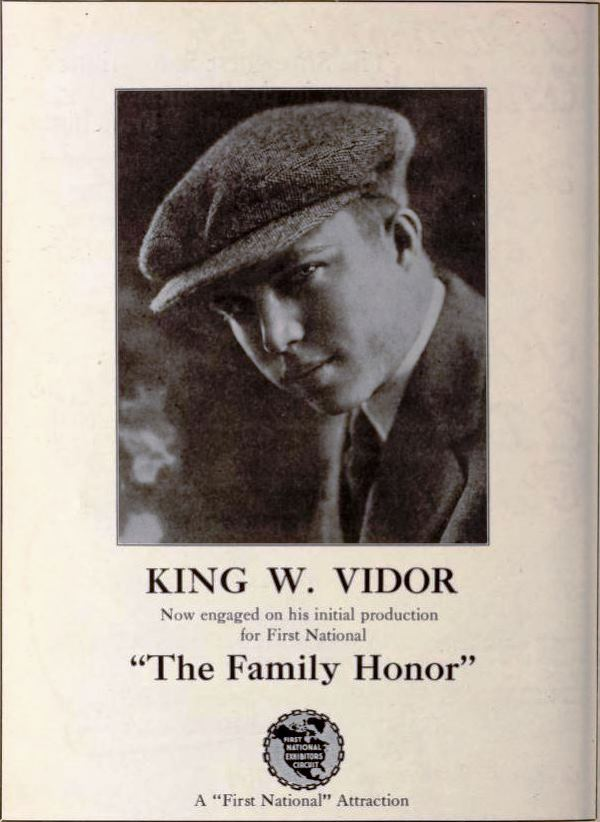
Vidor featured in the February 21, 1920, issue of Exhibitors Herald

== Amateur apprenticeship in Galveston ==
As a boy, Vidor engaged in photographing and developing portraits of his relatives with a Box Brownie camera.

At the age of 16, Vidor dropped out of a private high school in Maryland and returned to Galveston to work as a nickelodeon ticket taker and projectionist. As an 18-year-old amateur newsreel cameraman, Vidor began to acquire skills as a film documentarian. His first movie was based on footage taken of a local hurricane. He sold footage from a Houston army parade to a newsreel outfit (titled The Grand Military Parade) and made his first fictional movie, In Tow (1913), a semidocucomedy concerning a local automobile race.

== Hotex Motion Picture Company ==
Vidor, in a partnership with vaudevillian and movie entrepreneur Edward Sedgwick, formed the Hotex Motion Picture Company in 1914 ("HO" for Houston, "TEX" for Texas) to produce low-budget one- or two-reelers. The enterprise garnered a national press release in Moving Picture World announcing its formation. Only still photos survive from these comedy-adventures, for which Hotex failed to collect any royalties.

In 1915, newlyweds Vidor and actress Florence Arto Vidor, along with business partner Sedgwick, moved to California in search of employment in the emerging Hollywood movie industry, arriving on the West Coast virtually penniless.

== Hollywood apprenticeship ==
Based on a screen test arranged by Texas actress Corinne Griffith and shot by Charles Rosher in Hollywood, Florence Vidor procured a contract with Vitagraph Studios, marking the start of her successful movie career. Vidor obtained minor roles acting at Vitagraph and Inceville studios, such as a chauffeur in The Intrigue (1916). As a low-level office clerk at Universal, he was fired for trying to present his own scripts under the pseudonym "Charles K. Wallis", but soon was rehired by the studio as a writer of shorts.

=== Judge Willis Brown series ===
Beginning in 1915, Vidor served as screenwriter and director on a series of shorts about the rehabilitation of juvenile delinquents by social reformer Judge Willis Brown. Written and produced by Brown, Vidor filmed ten of the 20-film series, a project in which Vidor declared he had "deeply believed". A single reel from Bud's Recruit is known to survive, the earliest extant footage from Vidor's film directing career.

=== Brentwood Film Corporation and the "Preachment" films, 1918–1919 ===
In 1918, at the age of 24, Vidor directed his first Hollywood feature, The Turn in the Road (1919), a film presentation of a Christian Science evangelical tract sponsored by a group of doctors and dentists affiliated as the independent Brentwood Film Corporation. Vidor recalls of his first foray into Hollywood film-making:

I wrote a script [The Turn in the Road] and sent it around ... and nine doctors put up $1,000 each ... and it was a success. That was the beginning. I didn't have time to go to college.

Vidor made three more films for the Brentwood Corporation, all of which featured as yet-unknown comedienne Zasu Pitts, whom the director had discovered on a Hollywood streetcar. The films Better Times, The Other Half, and Poor Relations, all completed in 1919, also featured future film director David Butler and starred Vidor's then-wife Florence Arto Vidor (married in 1915), a rising actor in Hollywood pictures. Vidor ended his association with the Brentwood group in 1920.

=== Vidor Village and First National Exhibitors, 1920–1925 ===
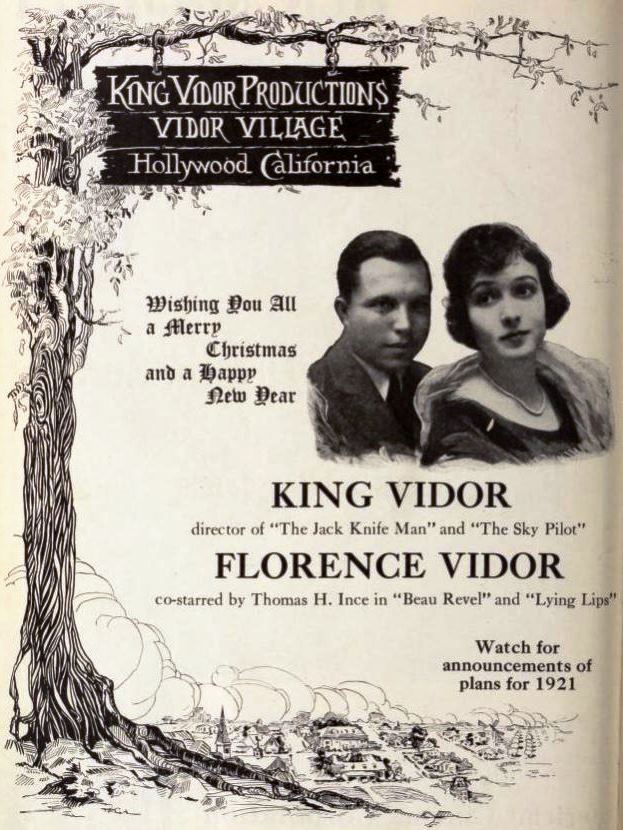
Holiday greetings from the Vidors, December 25, 1920

King Vidor next embarked on a major project in collaboration with a New York-based film exhibitor First National. In a bid to compete with the increasingly dominant Hollywood studios, First National advanced Vidor funding to build a small film-production facility in Santa Monica, California, dubbed Vidor Village. King Vidor issued a founding statement entitled "Creed and Pledge" that set forth moral anodynes for filmmaking, inspired by his Christian Science sympathies.

I believe in the motion picture that carries a message to humanity.

I believe in the picture that will help humanity to free itself from the shackles of fear and suffering that have so long bound it in chains.

I will not knowingly produce a picture that contains anything that I do not believe to be absolutely true to human nature, anything that could injure anyone or anything unclean in thought or action.

Nor will I deliberately portray anything to cause fright, suggest fear, glorify mischief, condone cruelty or extenuate malice.

I will never picture evil or wrong, except to prove the fallacy of its line.

So long as I direct pictures, I will make only those founded on the principles of right, and I will endeavor to draw upon the inexhaustible source of good for my stories, my guidance and my inspiration.

His "manifesto" was carried in Variety magazine's January 1920 issue.

The first production from Vidor Village was his The Jack Knife Man (1920), a bleak and bitter story of an orphaned boy raised by an impoverished yet kindly hermit, performed by former stage actor Fred Turner. The recluse achieves financial success and is ultimately rewarded with the affection of a hard-nosed but soft-hearted widow, played by Lillian Leighton. Redolent with the precepts of the "Creed and Pledge", the film's "relentless realism" did not please the executives at First National. They demanded entertainment that would garner a mass share of box-office receipts so as to fill their theaters.

As film critic and biographer John Baxter observed: "[t]his experience had a fundamental effect on Vidor's attitude toward filmmaking." Under pressure "as the studio system began to harden into place", the 26-year-old Vidor began to craft his films to conform to prevailing standards of the period. His 1920 film The Family Honor exemplifies this shift towards romantic comedies and away from the ideals that had informed The Jack Knife Man.

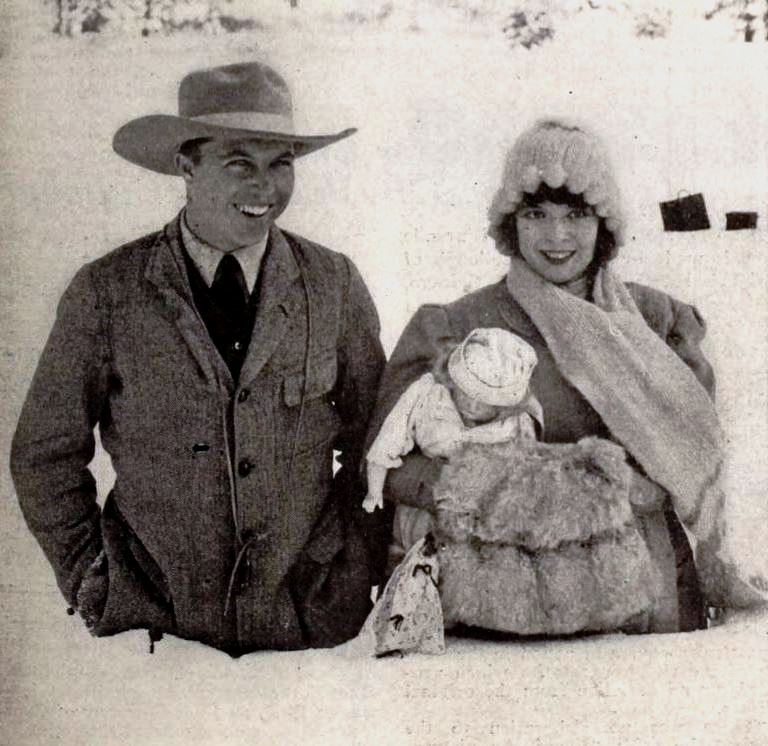
King Vidor and Colleen Moore on location for The Sky Pilot near Truckee, California

Vidor's The Sky Pilot (1921) was a big-budget western-comedy shot on location in the high Sierra Nevada of California. John Bowers stars as the intrepid preacher and Colleen Moore (soon to be famous as the quintessential Hollywood "flapper") as the girl he loved and rescued from a deadly cattle stampede. The natural landscapes serve as an essential dramatic component in the film, as they would in subsequent Vidor movies. The cost overruns cut into First National profits, and they declined to fund any further Vidor projects.

Vidor and Moore began a three-year romance on the set of The Sky Pilot that became "a Hollywood legend." In 1963, almost 40 years later, the couple resumed their relationship and remained close until Vidor's death in 1982.

Love Never Dies (1921) is a "rural love story" with a disaster scene depicting a locomotive and box cars derailing and plunging into a river below. The dramatic presentation of rivers served as a standard motif in Vidor films. Impressed with this Vidor sequence, producer Thomas H. Ince helped to finance the picture.

In 1922, Vidor produced and directed films that served as vehicles for his spouse, Florence Vidor, notable only for their "artificiality". These works conformed to the comedies of manners and romantic melodramas that were typical of his contemporary, Cecil B. DeMille at Famous Players–Lasky studios. Later, Vidor admitted to being overawed by DeMille's talents. Florence Vidor, in her later career, frequently starred in DeMille productions.

Vidor's next picture, Conquering the Woman, was an unabashed imitation of DeMille's drama Male and Female (1919), starring Gloria Swanson. Vidor followed up with Woman, Wake Up and The Real Adventure (both 1922), with each depicting a female struggling successfully to assert herself in a male-dominated world. As such, these may be considered as early examples of feminist-oriented cinema, but with entirely conventional endings.

By the early 1920s, Florence Vidor had emerged as a major film star in her own right and wished to pursue her career independent of her spouse. The couple divorced in 1926, and shortly thereafter, Florence married violinist Jascha Heifetz. Vidor would soon marry model and future film actress Eleanor Boardman.

Vidor Village went bankrupt in 1922, and Vidor, now without a studio, offered his services to the top executives in the film industry.

== Metro and Peg o' My Heart (1922) ==
Film producer Louis B. Mayer engaged Vidor to direct Broadway actress Laurette Taylor in a film version of her famous juvenile role as Peg O'Connell in Peg o' My Heart, written by her husband J. Hartley Manners. Despite viewing screen tests supplied by director D. W. Griffth, Vidor was anxious that the aging Taylor (born 1884) would not be convincing as her 18-year-old stage character on screen. Biographer Marguerite Courtney describes their first encounter:

in [her] frowzy wig and dead white makeup, the famous star looked closer to 40 than 18. At the first sight of Laurette, [Vidor] experienced acute relief. She came toward him smiling, and his camera-minded eye saw at once a face all round and animated, essentially youthful. Pumping her hand, he burst out impulsively, "For Heaven's sake, let's make a test with your own lovely hair!"

The process of adapting the stage version to film was nevertheless fraught with difficulties, complicated by a romantic attachment between director and star. The final product proved cinematically "lifeless".

Pleased with Peg o' My Heart box-office receipts, Mayer matched Vidor and Taylor again, resulting in a second feature-film success, Happiness (1923), also written by Manners, with Taylor playing a charming Pollyanna-like character. The film marked Vidor's final collaboration with the couple.

Next, Vidor was entrusted to direct Mayer's top female star Clara Kimball Young in The Woman of Bronze, a 1923 melodrama that resembled the formulaic films he had created with Florence Vidor at Vidor Village.

== Metro-Goldwyn-Mayer (1923–1944) ==
=== Silent era: 1923–1928 ===
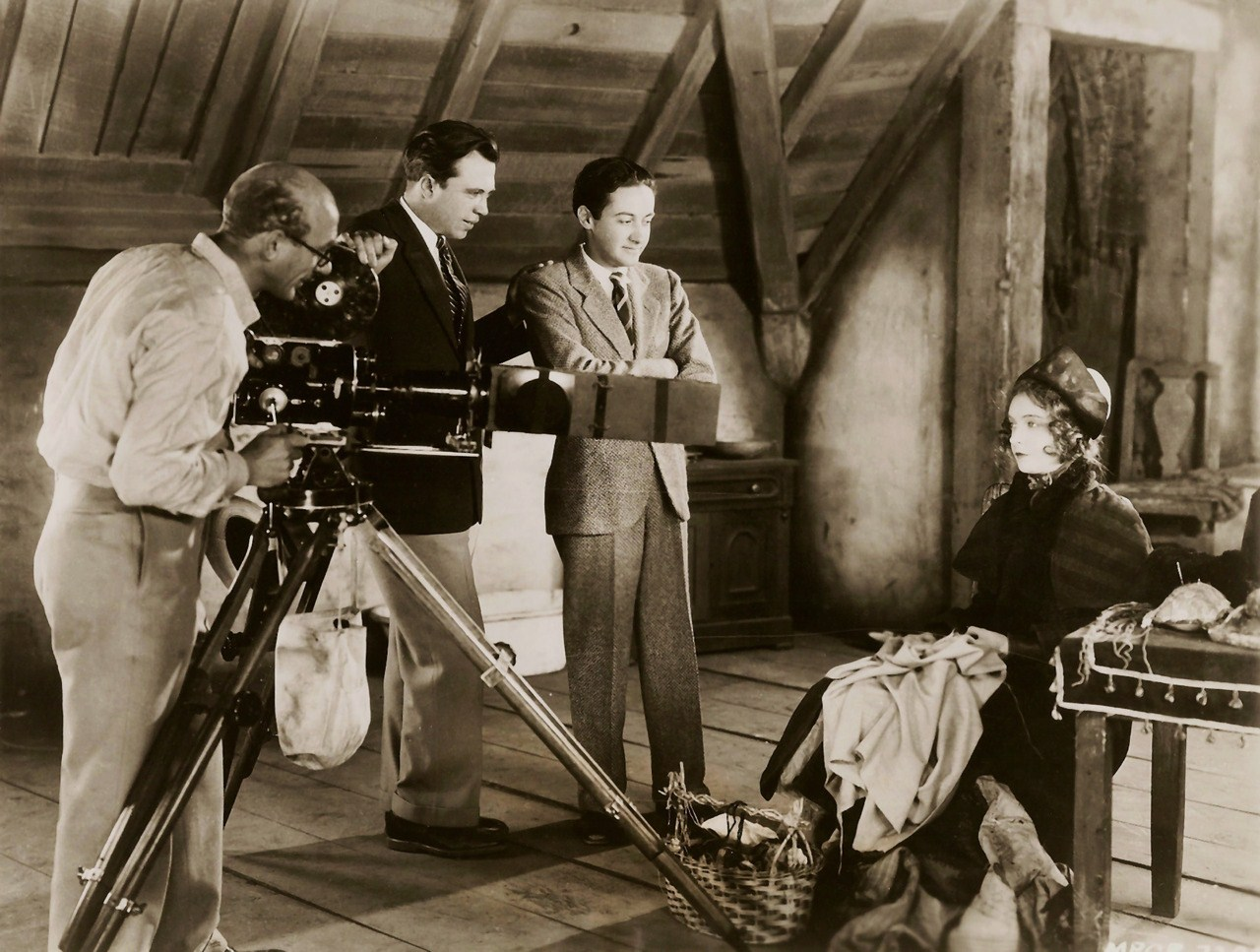
Hendrik Sartov (cinematographer), King Vidor (director), Irving Thalberg (producer) & Lillian Gish (co-star) on the set of La Bohème

Vidor's yeoman service to Louis B. Mayer secured him entrée into Goldwyn Pictures in 1923, a holding soon to be amalgamated with Metro-Goldwyn-Mayer. Samuel Goldwyn and other film producers of the early 1920s favored "literary" texts as the basis for movie screenplays. Parvenu-rich movie executives wished to provide a patina of class or "tone" to an industry often regarded as vulgar and cash-driven.

Vidor was content to adapt these "prestigious properties" to secure his reputation as a reliable studio asset. Wild Oranges (1924), from a story by Joseph Hergesheimer, is notable as a harbinger of his best work in the sound era. The natural features of the coastal regions of Georgia are endowed with sinister and homicidal potential, where a fugitive arrives to terrorize rural residents. As such, the film exhibits Vidor's trademark use of nature to symbolize aspects of the human conflict.

==== John Gilbert collaborations: 1925–1926 ====
Metro-Goldwyn-Mayer's cast of rising movie stars included soon-to-be matinee idol John Gilbert. Vidor directed him in His Hour (1924), based on an Elinor Glyn "febrile romance", and is one of the few films from Vidor's output of that period to survive. Gilbert, as the Russian nobleman Prince Gritzko, so ardently performed as co-star Aileen Pringle's seducer that one scene was deleted.

Vidor's typically "routine" movies of this period include Wine of Youth (1924) and Proud Flesh (1925), emphasizing the "time-honored virtues" of familial and matrimonial loyalty, even among the liberated Jazz Age flappers.

=== The Big Parade (1925) ===
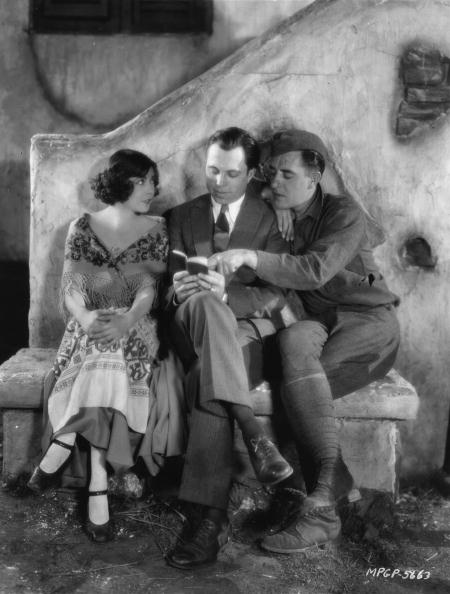
King Vidor (center) with Renée Adorée and John Gilbert. On the set of The Big Parade

"One of his least satisfactory silent films ... The Big Parade does not wear well: the portrait of World War I is softened and sentimentalized out of existence, soldiers portrayed as innocents thrust into the maw of battle, the cannons wreathed in scriptwriter's roses ... The scenes on the Western Front look trivial alongside contemporary photographs: the lice, the rats, and roaches, the urine and blood, the disease, fear, and horror of the true events are altogether lost in this version."—Biographer Charles Higham, in The Art of the American Film (1973).

In 1925 Vidor directed The Big Parade, among the most acclaimed films of the silent era, and a tremendous commercial success. The Big Parade, a war romance starring John Gilbert, established Vidor as one of MGM's top studio directors for the next decade. The film would influence contemporary directors G. W. Pabst in Westfront 1918 and Lewis Milestone in All Quiet on the Western Front, both 1930. Producer Irving Thalberg arranged for Vidor to film two more Gilbert films: La Bohème and Bardelys the Magnificent, both released in 1926. In La Bohème, a film of "great and enduring merit", leading lady Lillian Gish exerted considerable control over the film's production. Bardelys the Magnificent, a picaresque swashbuckler, mimicked the films of Douglas Fairbanks. Vidor would spoof the movie on his own Show People (1928) with comedienne Marion Davies.

=== The Crowd (1928) and cinematic populism ===
Vidor's next film would be a departure from romantic entertainment to an exposure of the "cruel deception of the American dream". In the late 1920s European films, especially from German directors, exerted a strong influence on filmmakers internationally. Vidor's The Crowd resonates with these populist films, a "pitiless study" of a young working man's descent into isolation and loss of morale who is ultimately crushed by the urban "assembly line", while his wife struggles to maintain some order in their relationship. Though the most uncharacteristic of Vidor's pictures, it was his personal favorite: the picture, he said, "came out of my guts."

Employing relatively unknown actors, the film had modest box office success, but was widely praised by critics. In 1928, Vidor received his first Oscar nomination for Best Director. M-G-M executives, who had been content to allow Vidor an "experimental" film, found the bleak social outlook of The Crowd troubling, and they delayed the film's release for a year. The Crowd has since been recognized as one of the "masterpieces" of the late silent era.

=== The Marion Davies comedies, 1928–1930 ===
Cosmopolitan Pictures, a subsidiary of M-G-M studios and controlled by influential newspaper magnate William Randolph Hearst, insisted that Vidor direct Marion Davies – Hearst's longtime mistress – in these Cosmopolitan-supervised films, to which Vidor acquiesced. Though not identified as a director of comedies, Vidor filmed three ""screwball"-like comedies that revealed Davies talents with her "drive-you-to-distraction persona".

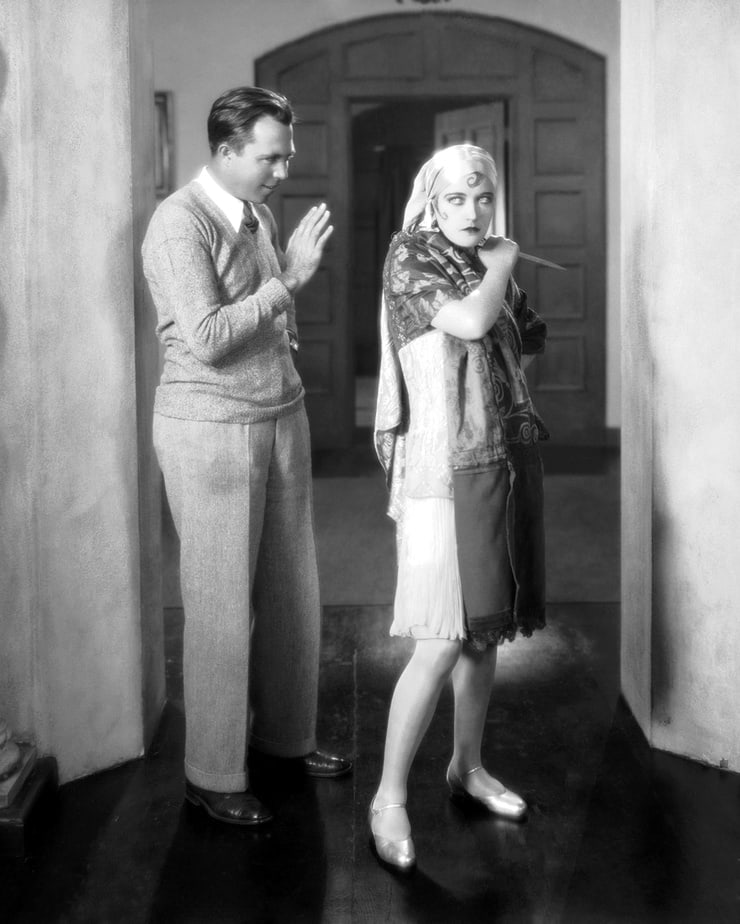
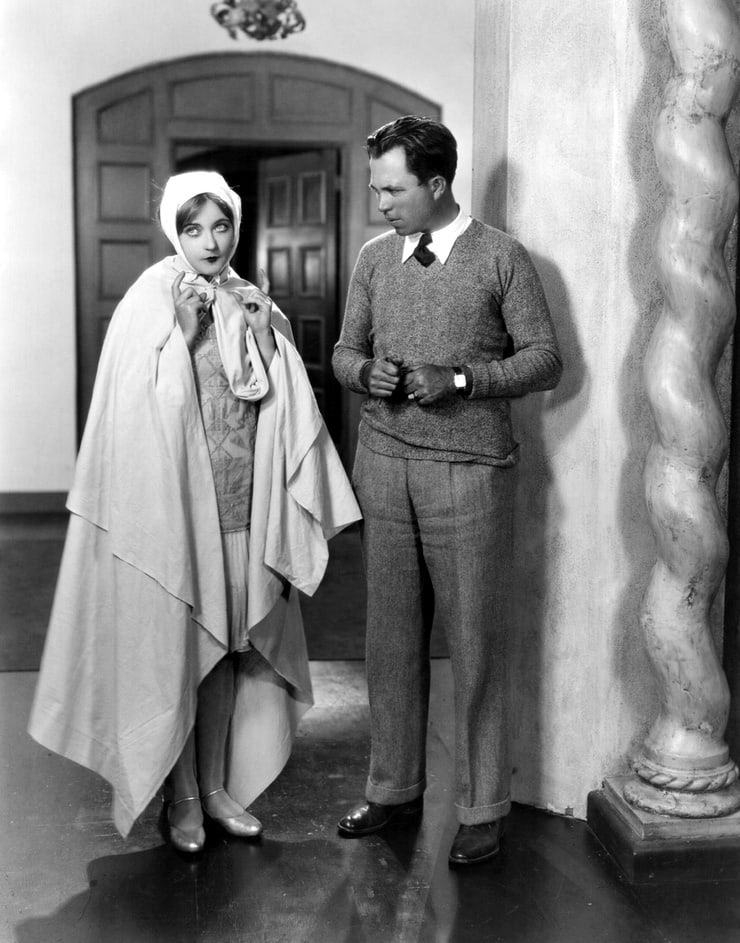
Left image: Davies imitating Gloria Swanson with King Vidor
Right image: Davies imitating Lillian Gish, both from the set of The Patsy

The Patsy, a comedy of manners, brought Marie Dressler and Dell Henderson, veterans of Mack Sennett "slapstick" era out of retirement to play Davies' farcical upper-class parents. Davies performs a number of celebrity imitations she was known for at social gatherings at Hearst's San Simeon estate, including Gloria Swanson, Lillian Gish, Pola Negri and Mae Murray. The scenario for Show People (1928) was inspired by Gloria Swanson, who began her film career in slapstick. Davies' character Peggy Pepper, a comic, is elevated to the high-style star Patricia Pepoire. Vidor spoofs his own recently completed Bardelys the Magnificent (1926), an over-the-top swashbuckling costume drama featuring romantic icon John Gilbert. Some of the best-known film stars of the silent era appeared in cameos, as well as Vidor himself. Show People is considered the enduring picture of the Vidor–Davies collaborations.

Vidor's third and final film with Davies was his second sound film (after Hallelujah (1929)): Not So Dumb (1930), adapted from the 1921 Broadway comedy Dulcy by George S. Kaufman. The limitations of early sound, despite recent innovations, interfered with the continuity of Davies' performance that had enlivened her earlier silent comedies with Vidor.

=== Early sound era: 1929–1937 ===
In early 1928, Vidor and his spouse Eleanor Boardman were visiting France in the company of Scott and Zelda Fitzgerald. There Vidor mixed with literary expatriates, among them James Joyce and Ernest Hemingway. Vidor was shaken by news that US film studios and theaters were converting to sound technology and he returned quickly to Hollywood, concerned about the impact on silent cinema. Adjusting to the advent of sound, Vidor enthusiastically embarked upon his long-desired project of making a picture about rural black American life incorporating a musical soundtrack. He quickly completed writing the scenario for Hallelujah and began recruiting an all African-American cast.

M-G-M studios had not yet decided which emerging sound technology they would invest in, Vitaphone or Movietone, a decision that would determine what camera system Vidor would use. Vidor circumvented the dilemma by appealing directly to President of Loew's Inc. Nicholas Schenck, who authorized Vidor to begin shooting outdoor location sequences without sound and with the caveat that Vidor waive his $100,000 salary.

==== Hallelujah (1929) ====
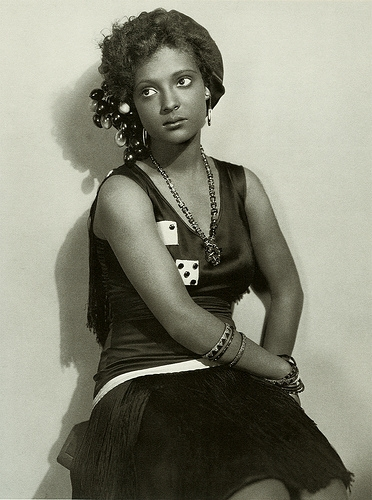
Nina Mae McKinney as Chick in Hallelujah

Vidor's first sound film Hallelujah (1929) combines a dramatic rural tragedy with a documentary-like depiction of black agrarian community of sharecroppers in the South. Daniel L. Haynes as Zeke, Nina Mae McKinney as Chick and William Fontaine as Hot Shot developed a love-triangle that leads to a revenge murder. A quasi-musical, Vidor's innovative integration of sound into the scenes, including jazz and gospel added to the cinematic effect.

Vidor, a third-generation Texan, encountered black workers employed at his father's sawmills when he was a child, and there he became familiar with their spirituals. As an adult, he was not immune to the racial prejudices common among whites in the South of the 1920s. His paternalistic claim to know the character of the "real negro" is reflected in his portrayal of some rural black characters as "childishly simple, lecherously promiscuous, fanatically superstitious, and shiftless". Vidor, nonetheless, avoids reducing his characters to Uncle Tom stereotypes and his treatment bears no resemblance to the overt racism in D. W. Griffith's The Birth of a Nation (1915).

The black sharecroppers resemble more the poor white agrarian entrepreneurs Vidor praised in his 1934 Our Daily Bread, emphasizing the class, rather than race, of his subjects. The film emerges as a human tragedy in which elemental forces of sexual desire and revenge contrast with family affection and community solidarity and redemption.

Hallelujah enjoyed an overwhelmingly positive response in the United States and internationally, praising Vidor's stature as a film artist and as a humane social commentator. Vidor was nominated for Best Director at the Academy Awards of 1929.

==== M-G-M 1930–1931: Billy the Kid and The Champ ====
Filmed just before passage of the Production Code of 1933, Vidor's Billy the Kid is free of the fixed moral dualities that came to typify subsequent Good Guy vs. Bad Guy Westerns in Hollywood. Starring former football champion Johnny Mack Brown as Billy and Wallace Beery as his nemesis Sheriff Pat Garrett, the protagonists display a gratuitous violence that anticipates Vidor's 1946 film Duel in the Sun (1946). Homicidal behavior resonates with the brutal and deadly desert landscape, Hemingwayesque in its brevity and realism. Studio executives were concerned that the excessive violence would alienate audiences, though the Prohibition era in the United States was saturated with news of the gangster-related killings.

Shot partially in the new 70 mm Grandeur system, the film was conceived by producers to be an epic, but few cinemas were equipped to handle the new wide-screen technology. The film did poorly at the box-office.

Upon his return to M-G-M after completing Street Scene for Samuel Goldwyn, Vidor embarked on his second picture starring actor Wallace Beery, this time with child actor Jackie Cooper in The Champ. Based on a story by Frances Marion, Vidor adapts a standard plot about a socially and economically impaired parent who relinquishes a child to insure his/her escape from squalid conditions to achieve an upwardly mobile future. The film is a descendant of director Charlie Chaplin's The Kid (1921), as well as Vidor's own early silent shorts for Judge Willis Brown. Vidor owed M-G-M a more conventional and "fool-proof" production after executives allowed him to make the more experimental Street Scene in 1931. The Champ would prove to be a successful vehicle for Beery and propel him to top-rank among M-G-M movie stars.

==== Bird of Paradise and RKO Pictures : Sojourn in Hawaii, 1932 ====
After finishing The Champ, Vidor was loaned to Radio-Keith-Orpheum (RKO) to make a "South Seas" romance for producer David Selznick filmed in the US territory of Hawaii. Starring Dolores del Río and Joel McCrea, the tropical location and mixed-race love theme in Bird of Paradise included nudity and sexual eroticism.

During production Vidor began an affair with script assistant Elizabeth Hill that led to a series of highly productive screenplay collaborations and their marriage in 1937. Vidor divorced his wife, actress Eleanor Boardman shortly after Bird of Paradise was completed.

==== Great Depression: 1933–1934 ====
The Stranger's Return (1933) and Our Daily Bread (1934) are Depression era films that present protagonists who flee the social and economic perils of urban America, plagued by high unemployment and labor unrest to seek a lost rural identity or make a new start in the agrarian countryside. Vidor's expressed enthusiasm for the New Deal and Franklin Delano Roosevelt's exhortation in his first inaugural in 1933 for a shift of labor from industry to agriculture.

In The Stranger's Return, a city girl (Miriam Hopkins) abandons her life in a great metropolis to visit her grandfather (Lionel Barrymore) in Iowa, the aging patriarch of a working farm. Her arrival upsets the schemes of parasitic relatives to seize the property in anticipation of Grandpa Storr's passing. The scenario presents the farm as "bountiful", even in the midst of the Dust Bowl where banks seized tens-of-thousands of independent family farms in the Midwest and drove millions into low wage seasonal agricultural labor. The picture is a paean to family "blood" ties and rural generational continuity, manifested in the granddaughter's commitment (though raised in New York City) to inherit the family farm and honor its agrarian heritage.

Vidor continued his "back to the land" theme in his 1934 Our Daily Bread. The picture is the second film of a trilogy he referred to as "War, Wheat and Steel". His 1925 film The Big Parade was "war" and his 1944 An American Romance was "steel". Our Daily Bread – "wheat" – is a sequel to his silent masterpiece The Crowd (1928).

Our Daily Bread is a deeply personal and politically controversial work that Vidor financed himself when M-G-M executives declined to back the production. M-G-M was uncomfortable with its characterization of big business, and particularity banking institutions, as corrupt. A struggling Depression-era couple from the city inherit a derelict farm, and in an effort to make it a productive enterprise, they establish a cooperative in alliance with unemployed locals who possess various talents and commitments. The film raises questions as to the legitimacy of the American system of democracy and to government imposed social programs.

The picture garnered a mixed response among social and film critics, some regarding it as a socialistic condemnation of capitalism and others as tending towards fascism – a measure of Vidor's own ambivalence in organizing his social outlook artistically.

=== The Goldwyn films: 1931–1937 ===
Street Scene (1931), Cynara (1932), The Wedding Night (1935), Stella Dallas (1937)

During the 1930s Vidor, though under contract to M-G-M studios, made four films under loan-out to independent producer Samuel Goldwyn, formerly with the Goldwyn studios that had amalgamated with Metro-Goldwyn-Mayer in 1924. Goldwyn's insistence on fidelity to the prestigious literary material he had purchased for screen adaptations imposed cinematic restraints on his film directors, including Vidor. The first of their collaborations since the silent era was Street Scene (1931)

The adoption of the Pulitzer Prize-winning play by Elmer Rice depicts a microcosm in a major American metropolis and its social and economic inequalities. The cinematic limitations imposed by a single set restricted to a New York City block of tenements building and its ethnically diverse inhabitants presented Vidor with unique technical challenges. He and cinematographer George Barnes countered and complemented these structural restrictions by using a roving camera mounted on cranes, an innovation made possible by recent developments in early sound technology.

The excellent cast, drawn largely from the Broadway production, contributed to the critical success of the film, as did the huge publicity campaign engineered by Goldwyn. Street Scene's immense box-office profits belied the financial and economic crisis of the early Depression years, when movie studios feared bankruptcy.

Cynara (1932), a romantic melodrama of a brief, yet tragic affair between a British barrister and a shopgirl, was Vidor's second sound collaboration with Goldwyn. Starring two of Hollywood's biggest stars of the period, Ronald Colman and Kay Francis, the story by Frances Marion is a cautionary tale concerning upper- and lower-class sexual infidelities set in England. Framed, as in the play and novel, in a series of flashbacks told by the married barrister Warlock (Colman), the story ends in honorable redemption for the barrister and death for his mistress. Vidor was able to inject some "pure cinema" into a picture that was otherwise a "dialogue-heavy" talkie: "Colman [in London] tears up a piece of paper and throws the pieces out a window, where they fly into the air. Vidor cuts to St. Mark's Square in Venice (where Frances, his spouse is vacationing), with pigeons flying into the air".

In his third collaboration with Goldwyn, Vidor was tasked with salvaging the producer's huge investment in Soviet-trained Russian actress Anna Sten. Goldwyn's effort to elevate Sten to the stature of Dietrich or Garbo had thus far failed despite his relentless promotion when Vidor began directing her in The Wedding Night (1935).

A tale of a doomed affair between a married New Yorker (Gary Cooper) (whose character Vidor based on novelist F. Scott Fitzgerald) and a farm girl (Sten) from an Old World Polish family, Vidor provided thoughtful direction to Cooper and Sten while cinematographer Gregg Toland's devised effective lighting and photography. Despite good reviews the picture did not establish Sten as a star among movie-goers and she remained "Goldwyn's Folly".

In 1937 Vidor made his final and most profitable picture with Samuel Goldwyn: Stella Dallas. A remake of Goldwyn's most successful silent movie, the 1925 Stella Dallas, also an adaptation of Olive Higgins Prouty's popular novel. Barbara Stanwyck stars as the eponymous "martyr of motherhood" in the sound re-make. Vidor analyzed director Henry King's handling of his silent production and incorporated or modified some of its filmic structure and staging. Stanwyck's performance, reportedly without undue oversight by Vidor, is outstanding, benefited by her selective vetting of Belle Bennett's famous portrayal. Vidor contributed to defining Stanwyck's role substantially in the final cut, providing a sharper focus on her character and delivering one of the great tear-jerkers in film history.

Despite the success of the film it would be his last with Goldwyn, as Vidor had tired of the producer's outbursts on the set. Vidor emphatically declined to work with the "mercurial" producer again.

=== Paramount Pictures: 1935–1936 ===
So Red the Rose (1935) and The Texas Rangers (1936)

Paramount production manager at Paramount Pictures, Ernst Lubitsch, persuaded Vidor to undertake the direction of a film based on a story that afforded a ""Southern" perspective, So Red the Rose, an American Civil War epic.

The topic appealed to the Texas-bred Vidor and he offered a dual vision of the antebellum South's response to the war among the white planter class, sentimentalizing their struggle and defeat. Here, the western "pioneer" plantation owners possess less of the anti-Northern fury that led to secession by their "Old South" counterparts. The scion of the estate, Duncan Bedford (Randolph Scott) initially refuses to join the Confederate army ("I don't believe Americans should fight Americans") but his cousin Vallette Duncan (Margaret Sullavan) scorns his pacifism and singlehandedly diverts her slaves from rebellion. The white masters of the "Portobello" plantation in Mississippi emerge from the conflict content that North and South made equal sacrifices, and that a "New South" has emerged that is better off without its white aristocracy and slavery. With Portobello in ruins, Valette and Duncan submit to the virtues of hard work in a pastoral existence.

The novel So Red the Rose (1934) by Stark Young in its narrative and theme anticipates author Margaret Mitchell's Gone with the Wind (1936). Vidor, initially tapped to direct Mitchell's epic, was ultimately assigned to director George Cukor.

The box-office failure of So Red the Rose led the film industry to anticipate the same for Cukor's adaptation of Mitchell's Civil War epic. To the contrary, Gone with the Wind (1939) enjoyed immense commercial and critical success.

At a period in the 1930s when Western theme films were relegated to low-budget B movies, Paramount studios financed an A Western for Vidor at $625,000 (lowered to $450,000 when star Gary Cooper was replaced with Fred MacMurray in the lead role.) The Texas Rangers, Vidor's second and final film for Paramount reduced, but did not abandon, the level of sadistic and lawless violence evidenced in his Billy the Kid. Vidor presents a morality play where the low-cunning of the outlaws cum vigilantes heroes is turned to the service of law-and-order when they kill their erstwhile accomplice in crime – the "Polka Dot Bandit.".

The film's scenario and script was penned by Vidor and wife Elizabeth Hill, based loosely on The Texas Rangers: A History of Frontier Defense of the Texas Rangers by Walter Prescott Webb. Made on the 100th anniversary of the formation of the Texas Ranger Division the picture includes standard B western tropes, including Indian massacres of white settlers and a corrupt city official who receives small town justice at the hands of a jury composed of saloon denizens. The film presages, as does Vidor's Billy the Kid (1931), his portrayal of the savagery of civilization and nature in producer David O. Selznick's Duel in the Sun (1946).

In an effort to retain Vidor at Paramount, the production head William LeBaron offered him a biopic of Texas icon, Sam Houston. Vidor emphatically declined: "... "I've [had] such a belly-full of Texas after the Rangers that I find myself not caring whether Sam Houston takes Texas from the Mexicans or lets them keep it."

=== Screen Directors Guild ===
In the 1930s Vidor became a leading advocate for the formation of the Screen Directors Guild (SDG) (called the Directors Guild of America (DGA) since 1960 when television directors joined its ranks.)

In an effort to enlarge movie director's meager influence in studio production decisions, Vidor personally exhorted a dozen or more leading directors, among them Howard Hawks, William Wellman, Ernst Lubitsch and Lewis Milestone to form a union, leading to the incorporation of the SDG in January 1936. By 1938, the collective bargaining unit had grown from a founding membership of 29 to an inclusive union of 600, representing Hollywood directors and assistant directors. The demands under Vidor's tenure at SDG were mild, seeking increased opportunities to examine scripts before filming and to make the initial cut on a movie.

As the SDG's first president, and a founding member of the anti-Communist group the Motion Picture Alliance for the Preservation of American Ideals, Vidor failed to bring the SDG into affiliation with the American Federation of Labor (AFL) that had already organized actors and screenwriters (deemed a "Bolshevik" political front by anti-communist critics). Not until 1939 would the directors sign an accord with these sister guilds, under then SDG president Frank Capra.

== M-G-M: 1938–1944 ==
Upon completion of Stella Dallas and his disaffection from Samuel Goldwyn, Vidor returned to M-G-M under a five-film contract that would produce The Citadel (1938), Northwest Passage (1940), Comrade X (1940), H. M. Pulham, Esq. (1941) and An American Romance (1944). In 1939, Vidor would also direct the final three weeks of primary filming for The Wizard of Oz (1939).

Film historian John Baxter describes the demands that the studio system at M-G-M had on an auteur director such as Vidor in this period:

M-G-M's assembly line system caught up with even top directors like Vidor, who could be called on to pass judgment on a new property or even prepare a project, only to find themselves a few days later shifted to something else.

These unconsummated projects at M-G-M include National Velvet (1944) and The Yearling (1946), the later in which Vidor presided over a failed attempt to produce a population of juvenile deer who would be age-appropriate throughout the production (female deer refused to reproduce out of season). Both films would be completed by the director Clarence Brown. Vidor further invested six months shooting an Amazon River survival-adventure, The Witch in the Wilderness from which he was diverted to perform pre-production for Northwest Passage (1940). This period would be one of transition for Vidor but would lead to an artistic phase where he created some of his richest and most characteristic works.

The Citadel: The first picture under the contract and the first under the Screen Directors Guild (SDG) was The Citadel in 1938. Filmed in England at a time the British government and trade unions had placed restrictions designed to extract a portion of the highly lucrative American movie exports to the British Isles. M-G-M, as a tactical olive branch, agreed to hire British actors as cast members for The Citadel and provided them generous compensation. (American actress Rosalind Russell and Vidor were the only two non-Britons who served on the film's production).

The movie is a close adaptation of A. J. Cronin's novel of the same name, an exposé of the mercenary aspects of the medical profession that entices doctors to serve the upper-classes at the expense of the poor. Vidor's Christian Science-inspired detachment from the medical profession influence his handling of the story, in which an independent doctor's cooperative is favored over both socialized medicine and a profit-driven medical establishment.

The protagonist, Dr. Andrew Manson (Robert Donat) ultimately resorts to an act of anarchism by using explosives to destroy a disease-producing sewer, but emerges personally vindicated. A success at the Academy Awards, the film garnered nominations for Best Picture, Best Actor (Donat), Best Director and Best Original Screenplay.

During the late 1930s M-G-M enlisted Vidor to assume artistic and technical responsibilities, some of which went uncredited. The most outstanding of these was his shooting of the black-and-white "Kansas" sequences in The Wizard of Oz, including the notable musical production in which Dorothy Judy Garland sings "Over the Rainbow". Portions of the Technicolor sequences that depict Dorothy and her companions lulled into sleep on a field of poppies were also handled by Vidor.

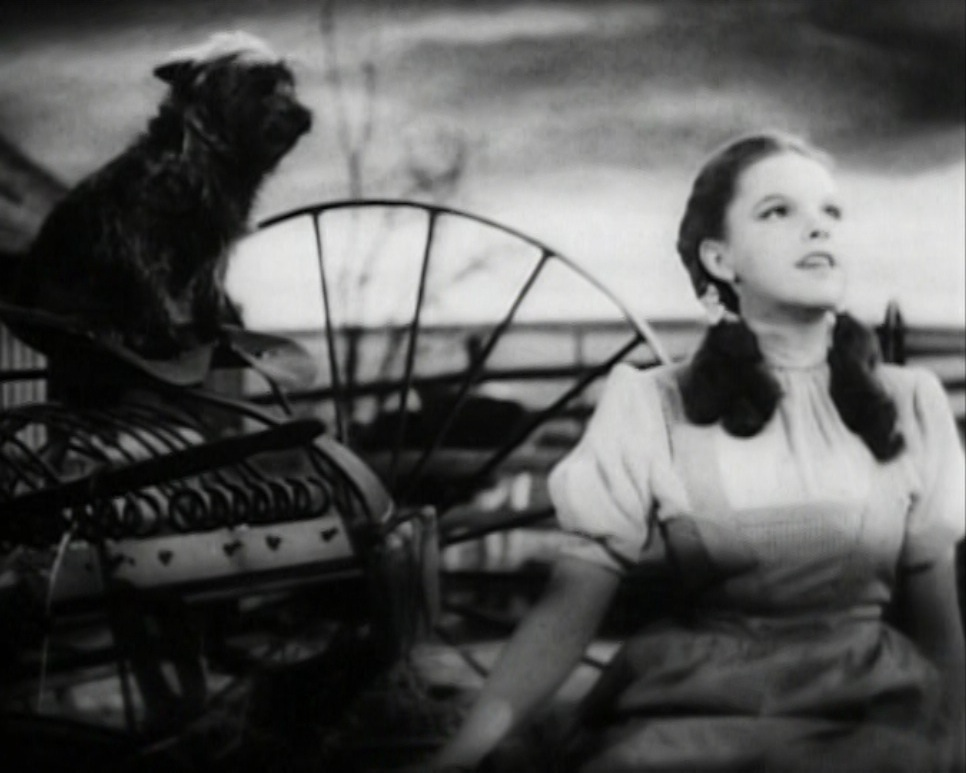
Vidor directed the black & white sequences for The Wizard of Oz (1939), including Judy Garland singing "Over the Rainbow"

The sound era saw the eclipse of the Western movie that had its heyday in the silent era and by the 1930s the genre was relegated to the producers of B movies. By the end of the decade high-budget films depicting the Indian Wars in the America of the 18th and 19th century reappeared, notably Ford's Drums Along the Mohawk (1939) and DeMille's North West Mounted Police (1940)

In the summer of 1939, Vidor began filming a Western-themed picture in Idaho using the three-strip Technicolor system. The picture that emerged is one of his "master works": Northwest Passage (1940).

Northwest Passage: Based on an American colonial-era epic novel, the film describes a punitive expedition against an Abenaki (Iroquois) village by a unit of British Army irregulars during the French and Indian Wars. Major Robert Rogers (Spencer Tracy) leads his green-clad "Roberts Rangers" on a grueling trek through 200 miles of wilderness. The Rangers fall upon the village and brutally exterminate the inhabitants who are suspected of assaulting white settlements. A demoralized retreat ensues led by Rogers. Under retaliatory attack by Indians and a savage landscape the Rangers are pushed to the limits of their endurance, some reduced to cannibalism and madness.

The script by Laurence Stallings and Talbot Jennings (and several uncredited writers) conveys the unabashed anti-Indian hatred that motivates Roger's men to their task. The level of violence anticipates film noir of the post-World War II period and the McCarthy era.

Vidor began filming in July 1939, just weeks before war was declared in Europe and the isolationist or interventionist policies were widely debated. The film influenced tropes that appeared in subsequent war films, depicting small military units operating behind enemy lines and relying on harsh tactics to destroy enemy combatants. The relevance of Northwest Passage's sanguinary adventurer to contemporary Americans confronted with a looming world war is never made explicit but raises moral questions on "military virtue" and how a modern war might be conducted. Though Vidor was "anti-fascist" his political predilections are left unstated in Northwest Passage. Vidor established an unusually close professional relationship with the film's star, Spencer Tracy, and the actor delivered what Vidor considered a performance of "tremendous conviction".

Vidor used Technicolor's three-strip camera system for the film, marking his first full film in color. The two 800-pound [365 kg] rented Technicolor cameras had to be transported by train. The color photography conveys the scenics of Payette Lake, injecting documentary realism into key sequences. Notable are those of the Rangers portaging boats through a rugged mountain pass, and the famous river "human chain" crossing. Despite its significant box office earnings, Northwest Passage failed to recoup its $2 million production costs. The cinematography earned an Oscer nomination in that category.

Comrade X: A political comedy set in the Soviet Union, Comrade X (1940) was conceived as a vehicle for M-G-M's glamorous acquisition Hedy Lamarr, in the hopes they might duplicate the profits they reaped from M-G-M star Greta Garbo in Ninotchka (1939). "Comrade" X is played by Clark Gable, a cynical American journalist who exposes Stalin-era cultural falsifications in his dispatches to his newspaper in the United States. Lamarr plays a Moscow tram conductor. Her coldly logical persona ultimately proves susceptible to Gable's America-inspired enthusiasms. Released in December 1940, the scurrilous tone of the dialogue toward the USSR officials was consistent with US government posture in the aftermath of the Hitler–Stalin Pact of August 1939. When Germany invaded the Soviet Union in June 1941 (after America's entry into WWII in December 1941), Russians became US allies in the war effort against the Axis powers. Reflecting these developments, M-G-M executives, just six months after the film's release, inserted a disclaimer assuring audiences that the movie was only a farce, not a hostile critique of the USSR. Writer Walter Reisch, who also scripted Ninotchka, earned an Oscar nomination for best original story.

Vidor disparaged the picture as "an insignificant light comedy" that afforded him "a change of pace." Vidor's next picture would be a cold-eyed examination of the institution of marriage and a much more personal work: H.M. Pulham, Esq. (1941).

H. M. Pulham, Esq.: With wife and screenwriting partner Elizabeth Hill, Vidor adapted John P. Marquand's highly popular novel of the same name. A story of a married man tempted to revive an affair with an old flame, Vidor draws upon memories of a failed romance from his own youth.

Harry Pulham (Robert Young), a member of the New England's conservative upper-middle class, is stultified by the respectable routines of life and a proper marriage to his wife Kay (Ruth Hussey). Vidor examines Pulham's past in a series of flashbacks that reveal a youthful affair Harry had with an ambitious German immigrant, Marvin Myles (Hedy Lamarr) at a New York advertising agency. They prove incompatible, largely due to different class orientation and expectations: Marvin pursues her dynamic career in New York and Harry returns to the security of his Bostonian social establishment. In an act of desperate nostalgia, Pulham attempts to rekindle the relationship 20 years later, to no avail. His attempt at rebellion failed, Harry Pulham consciously submits to a life of conformity that falls short of freedom but offers self-respect and a modest contentment.

H. M. Pulham, Esq was completed by Vidor after years of manufacturing "conventional successes" for M-G-M. The calm certitude of Harry Pulham in the face of enforced conformity may reflect Vidor's determination to artistically address larger issues in contemporary American society. His next, and final movie for M-G-M, would be the "Steel" component of his "War, Wheat and Steel" film trilogy: An American Romance (1944).

An American Romance: Rather than demonstrate his patriotism by joining a military film unit Vidor attempted to create a paean to American democracy. His 1944 An American Romance represents the "steel" installment of Vidor's "War, Wheat and Steel" trilogy and serves as his "industrial epic".and emerged from an extremely convoluted screenwriting evolution. Vidor personifies the relationship between man and the natural resources on which struggles to impose his purpose on nature.

The lead role of immigrant Stefan Dubechek was offered to Spencer Tracy but the actor declined, an acute disappointment for the director who had greatly admired Tracy's performance in his Northwest Passage (1940). Vidor's dissatisfaction with the studio's casting, including lead Brian Donlevy, led Vidor to concentrate on the industrial landscape to reveal the motivations of his characters.

Despite producer Louis B. Mayer's personal enthusiasm for the picture, his studio deleted 30 minutes from the movie, mostly essential human interest sequences and only preserving the abundant documentary scenes. Disgusted by M-G-M's mutilations, Vidor terminated his 20-year association with the studio. The film received negative reviews and was a financial failure. Some critics noted a shift in Vidor's focus from working class struggles to celebrating the ascent of a "Ford-like" industrial magnate. Film historian Raymond Durgnat considers the picture "his least personal, artistically weakest and most spiritually confused."

The failure of An American Romance, after an artistic investment of three years, staggered Vidor and left him deeply demoralized. The break with M-G-M presented an opportunity to establish a more satisfying relationship with other studio producers. Emerging from this "spiritual" nadir he would create a Western of great intensity: Duel in the Sun (1946).

=== A sound era magnum opus: Duel in the Sun (1946) ===
At the end of 1944 Vidor considered a number of projects, including a remake of his silent era Wild Oranges (1924), this time with producer David O. Selznick.

When Selznick purchased the rights to Niven Busch's novel Duel in the Sun in 1944, Vidor agreed to rewrite Oliver H. P. Garrett's screenplay and direct a miniature Western, "small" but "intense". Selznick's increasingly grandiose plans for the production involved his wish to promote the career of actress-mistress Jennifer Jones and to create a movie rivaling his successful 1939 Gone with the Wind. Selzick's personal and artistic ambitions for Duel in the Sun led to conflicts with Vidor over development of the themes which emphasized "sex, violence and spectacle". Vidor walked off the set just before primary filming was completed, unhappy with Selznick's intrusive management. The producer would enlist eight additional directors to complete the picture. Though the final cut was made without Vidor's participation, the production reflects the participation of these talented filmmakers, among them William Dieterle and Josef von Sternberg. Vidor was awarded sole screen credit after Directors Guild arbitration.

Duel in the Sun is a melodramatic treatment of a Western theme concerning a conflict between two generations of the McCanles family. The elderly and crippled McCanles Lionel Barrymore presides with an iron fist over his a vast cattle estate with his invalid wife Laura Belle Candles Lillian Gish. Their two sons, Lewt and Jess, are polar opposites: the educated Jess "the good son" Joseph Cotten takes after his refined mother, while Lewt "the bad son" Gregory Peck emulates his domineering cattle baron father. The adoption of the young orphan girl Pearl Chavez, the "half-breed" offspring of a European gentleman and a native-American mother, whom Pearl's father has murdered and been executed for his crime, introduces a fatal element into the McCanles family. The film noir ending includes an attempted fratricide and a suicide-like love pact, destroying the McCanles family.

The iconic film director D. W. Griffith, famous for his silent classics Broken Blossoms (1919) and Way Down East (1920) both starring Lillian Gish, visited the Duel in the Sun set unannounced during filming. Abashed, Gish and co-star Barrymore became tongue-tied. Vidor was compelled to insist that Griffith withdraw, and the chastened Griffith complied graciously.

The "unbridled sexuality" portrayed by Vidor between Pearl and Lewt created a furor that drew criticism from the US Congressmen and film censors, which led to the studio cutting several minutes before its final release.

Selznick launched Duel in the Sun in hundreds of theaters, backed by a multiple-million dollar promotional campaign. Despite the film's poor critical reception (termed "Lust in the Dust" by its detractors) the picture's box office returns rivaled the highest-grossing film of the year, The Best Years of Our Lives (1946).

Film archivist Charles Silver offered this appraisal of the Vidor-Selznick collaboration:

"[W]hen Pearl Chavez (Jennifer Jones) rides out to kill Lewt (Gregory Peck), she is uncannily transformed into a phantasm of a young resolute Mrs. McCanles (Lillian Gish), thus killing the son she despises via the daughter she never had. This is perhaps the most outrageous conceit of an entirely outrageous movie, and it is brilliant. As Andrew Sarris has said: 'In cinema, as in all art, only those who risk the ridiculous have a real shot at the sublime.' In Duel in the Sun, an older, less hopeful, but still enterprising King Vidor came damn close to the bullseye."

==== On Our Merry Way (A Miracle Can Happen), Universal Studios 1948 ====
In the aftermath of his critical failures in An American Romance (1944) and Duel in the Sun (1946), Vidor disengaged from Hollywood film production to purchase his Willow Creek Ranch in Paso Robles, California.

A Miracle Can Happen (1948) is a film sketch that Vidor participated in with co-director Leslie Fenton during this period of relative inactivity. A "low-budget" Universal Studios release of the early baby boom era, this "omnibus" presents vignettes filmed or performed by an array of actors and directors (some of them returning from service in the armed forces) among them Burgess Meredith, Paulette Goddard, Dorothy Lamour, James Stewart, John Huston and George Stevens. (An episode with British actor Charles Laughton was cut from the final release, a disappointment to Vidor.) The picture's title was changed shortly after opening to On Our Merry Way to promote its comedic virtues. Vidor dismissed the film from his oeuvre in later years.

In 1948 Vidor was diverted from making a series of 16mm Westerns for television and produced on his ranch when Warner Brothers studios approached him to direct an adaptation of author Ayn Rand's controversial novel The Fountainhead. Vidor immediately accepted the offer.

=== Warner Brothers: 1949–1951 ===
Vidor's three films for Warner Brothers studios—The Fountainhead (1949), Beyond the Forest (1949) and Lightning Strikes Twice (1951)—were crafted to reconcile the excessive and amoral violence displayed in his Duel in the Sun (1946) with a constructive presentation of American individualism that comported with his Christian Science precepts of morality.

The Fountainhead (1949): Unhappy with the screen adaptation offered by Warner Brothers for Ayn Rand's 1943 novel The Fountainhead, Vidor asked the author to write the script. Rand accepted but inserted a caveat into her contract requiring that she authorize any deviation from the book's story or dialogue. Vidor accepted the provision.

Aspects of Rand's philosophy of Objectivism are distilled through the character of architect Howard Roark (Gary Cooper), who adopts an uncompromising stance on the physical integrity of his proposed designs. When one of his architectural projects is compromised, he destroys the building with dynamite. At his trial, Roark offers a principled and forthright defense for his act of sabotage and is exonerated by the jury. Though Vidor was committed to developing his own populist notion of American individualism, Rand's didactic Objectivist scenario and script informs much of the film. The Roark character is loosely based on the architect Frank Lloyd Wright, both in the novel and Vidor's film version.

Vidor's most outstanding cinematic innovation in The Fountainhead is his highly stylized images of the Manhattan high-rise interiors and skylines. The urban landscapes, created by Art Director Edward Carrere were strongly influenced by German Expressionism and contribute to the film's compelling film noir character. The eroticism inherent in the sets resonate with the on-screen sexual tension, augmented by the off-screen affair between Cooper and Patricia Neal, who plays the architect's ally-adversary Dominique Francon.

The Fountainhead enjoyed profitable box-office returns but a poor critical reception. Satisfied with his experience at Warner's, Vidor signed a two-film contract with the studio. In his second picture he would direct Warner's most prestigious star Bette Davis in Beyond the Forest (1949).

Beyond the Forest (1949): A lurid noir melodrama that tracks the descent of a petty-bourgeois Madame Bovary-like character, Rosa Moline (Bette Davis) into marital infidelity, murder and a sordid death, the picture has earned a reputation as a "Camp" classic. The film is often cited for providing the phrase "What a dump!", appropriated by playwright Edward Albee in his 1962 Who's Afraid of Virginia Woolf? and its 1966 screen adaptation.

Despising the role assigned her by producer Jack Warner and feuding with director Vidor over her character's portrayal, Davis delivers a performance considered one of the best in her mid-career by critics. The role of Rosa Moline would be her last film with Warner Brothers after seventeen years with the studio.

Vidor's characterization of Davis as the unsophisticated Gorgon-like Rosa (the film was titled La Garce, [The Bitch], in French releases) were widely rejected by her fans and contemporary film critics and reviews "were the worst of Vidor's career."

Vidor and Max Steiner inserted a leitmotif into those sequences where Rosa obsessively longs for escape from the dull, rural Loyalton to the cosmopolitan and sophisticated Chicago. The "Chicago" theme surfaces (a tune made famous by Judy Garland) in an ironic style reminiscent of film composer Bernard Herrmann. Steiner earned an Academy Award nomination for Best Film Score.

Lightning Strikes Twice (1951): His final picture for Warner Brothers, Vidor attempted to create a film noir tale of a deadly love triangle starring Richard Todd, Ruth Roman and Mercedes McCambridge, a cast that did not suit Vidor. A standard Warner's melodrama, Vidor declared that the picture "turned out terribly" and is largely unrepresentative of his work except in its western setting and its examination of sexual strife, the theme of the film. Vidor's next project was proposed by producer Joseph Bernhard after pre-production and casting were nearly complete: Japanese War Bride (1952).

==== Japanese War Bride (1952): Twentieth Century Fox ====
The topic of the film, white racial prejudice in post-WWII America, had been addressed in a number of Hollywood films of the period, including directors Joseph Losey's The Lawless (1950) and Mark Robson's Home of the Brave (1949).

The story by co-producer Anson Bond concerns wounded Korean War veteran Jim Sterling (Don Taylor), who returns with his bride, Japanese nurse Tae (Shirley Yamaguchi), to his parents' farm in California's Central Valley. Conflicts arise when Jim's sister-in-law falsely accuses Tae of infidelity, sparking conflicts with the neighboring Nisei-owned farm. The picture locates acts of racism towards non-whites as personal neurosis rather than socially constructed prejudice. Vidor's artistic commitments to the film were minimal in a production that was funded as a B Movie, though he meticulously documents the experience of workers in field and factory.

Before beginning direction of Japanese War Bride, Vidor had already arranged with Bernhard to finance his next project and perhaps "the last great film" of his career: Ruby Gentry (1952).

==== Ruby Gentry (1952): Twentieth Century Fox ====
With Ruby Gentry, Vidor revisits the themes and scenario of Duel in the Sun (1946), in which an impoverished young woman, Jennifer Jones (Ruby née Corey, later Gentry), is taken in by a well-to-do couple. When the foster mother dies (Josephine Hutchinson) Ruby marries the widower (Karl Malden) for security, but he too dies under circumstances that cast suspicions on Ruby. She is harried by her evangelical preacher-sibling (James Anderson) and her love affair with the son of a local land-owing scion (Charlton Heston) leads to a deadly shootout, a climax that recalls Vidor's violent 1946 Western.

Vidor deferred his own salary to make the low-budget work, filming the "North Carolina" landscapes on his California ranch. American critics generally disparaged the movie.

Film historian Raymond Durgnat champions Ruby Gentry "as a truly great American film...film noir imbued with new fervor" that combines a radical social understanding with a Hollywood veneer and an intensely personal artistic statement. Vidor ranks Ruby Gentry among his most artistically gratifying works: "I had complete freedom in shooting it, and Selznick, who could have had an influence on Jennifer Jones, didn't intervene. I think I succeeded in getting something out of Jennifer, something quite profound and subtle." The swamp sequence where Ruby and her lover Boake hunt one another is "perhaps the best sequence [Vidor] ever filmed." Ruby Gentry showcases the essential elements of Vidor's oeuvre depicting the extremes of passion inherent in humanity and nature. Vidor commented on these elements as follows:

"There's one scene I like a lot...because it corresponds to something vital. It's the scene where the girl [Jennifer Jones] has the barrage demolished. At the moment when the earth is flooded, the man [Charlton Heston] is destroyed. All his ambitions crumble. I think there is a fine symbol there".

==== Autobiography: A Tree is a Tree ====
In 1953, Vidor's autobiography entitled A Tree is a Tree was published and widely praised. Film critic Dan Callahan provides this excerpt the book:

"I believe that every one of us knows that his major job on earth is to make some contribution, no matter how small, to this inexorable movement of human progress. The march of man, as I see it, is not from the cradle to the grave. It is instead, from the animal or physical to the spiritual. The airplane, the atom bomb, radio, radar, television are all evidences of the urge to overcome the limitations of the physical in favor of the freedom of the spirit. Man, whether he is conscious of it or not, knows deep inside that he has a definite upward mission to perform during the time of his life span. He knows that the purpose of his life cannot be stated in terms of ultimate oblivion."

==== Light's Diamond Jubilee, General Electric, 1954 ====
As part of the 75th Anniversary of Thomas Edison's invention of electric light, Vidor adapted two short stories for television produced by David O. Selznick. The production aired on all the major American TV networks on October 24, 1954.

Vidor's contributions included "A Kiss for the Lieutenant" by author Arthur Gordon starring Kim Novak, an amusing romantic vignette, as well as an adaptation of novelist John Steinbeck's short story "Leader of the People" (1937) (from his novella The Red Pony) in which a retired wagon-master, Walter Brennan, rebuffed by his son Harry Morgan, finds a sympathetic audience for his War Horse reminiscences about the Old West in his grandson Brandon deWilde. Screenwriter Ben Hecht wrote the scripts for both segments.

In 1954 Vidor, in collaboration with longtime associate and screenwriter Laurence Stallings, pursued a remake of the director's silent era The Turn in the Road (1919). Vidor's persistent efforts to revive this Christian Science-themed work spanning 15 years in the post-war period was never consummated, though a cast was proposed for an Allied Artists production in 1960. Setting aside this endeavor, Vidor opted to film a Western with Universal-International, Man Without a Star (1955).

==== Man Without a Star, 1955 ====
Based on a story by Dee Linford of the same name and scripted by Borden Chase, Man Without a Star is an iconographic Western tale of remorseless struggle between a wealthy rancher Reed Bowman (Jeanne Crain) and small homesteaders. Saddle-tramp and gunman Dempsey Rae (Kirk Douglas) is drawn into the vortex of violence, that Vidor symbolizes with ubiquitous barbed-wire. The cowboy ultimately prevails against the hired gunslinger Steve Miles (Richard Boone) who had years ago murdered Rae's younger brother.

Kirk Douglas acted as both the star and uncredited producer in a collaborative effort with director Vidor. Neither was entirely satisfied with the result. Vidor failed to fully develop his thematic conception, the ideal of balancing personal freedoms with conservation of the land as a heritage. Vidor and Douglas succeeded in creating Douglas's splendid character, Dempsey Rae, who emerges as a vital force, especially in the saloon-banjo sequence that screenwriter Borden Chase termed "pure King Vidor".

Man Without a Star, rated as "a minor work" by biographer John Baxter, marks a philosophical transition in Vidor's outlook towards Hollywood: the Dempsey Rae figure, though retaining his personal integrity, "is a man without a star to follow; no ideal, no goal" reflecting a declining enthusiasm by the director for American topics. Vidor's final two movies, the epics War and Peace (an adaptation of the novel by Russian author Leo Tolstoy), and Solomon and Sheba, a story from the Old Testament, followed the director's realization that his self-conceived film proposals would not be welcomed by commercial movie enterprises. This pair of historical costume dramas were created outside Hollywood, both filmed and financed in Europe.

=== War and Peace (1956) ===
Contrary to his aesthetic aversion to adapting historical spectaculars, in 1955 Vidor accepted independent Italian producer Dino De Laurentis's offer to create a screen adaptation of Leo Tolstoy's vast historical romance of the late-Napoleonic era, War and Peace (1869). In the public domain, War and Peace was under consideration for adaptation by several studios. Paramount Pictures and De Laurenti rushed the film into production before a proper script could be formulated from Tolstoy's complex and massive tale, requiring rewrites throughout the shooting. The final cut, at three hours, was necessarily a highly compressed version of the literary work.

Tolstoy's themes of individualism, the centrality of family and national allegiance and the virtues of agrarian egalitarianism were immensely appealing to Vidor. He commented on the pivotal character in the novel, Pierre Bezukhov (played by Henry Fonda): "The strange thing about it is the character of Pierre is the same character I had been trying to put on the screen in many of my own films." Vidor was unsatisfied with the choice of Henry Fonda for the role of Pierre, and argued in favor of British actor Peter Ustinov. He was overruled by Dino de Laurentis, who insisted that the central figure in the epic appear as a conventional romantic leading man, rather than as the novel's "overweight, bespectacled" protagonist. Vidor sought to endow Pierre's character so as to reflect the central theme of Tolstoy's novel: an individual's troubled striving to rediscover essential moral truths. The superficiality of the script and Fonda's inability to convey the subtleties of Pierre's spiritual journey thwarted Vidor's efforts to actualize the film's theme. Recalling these interpretive disputes, Vidor remarked that "though a damn good actor... [Fonda] just did not understand what I was trying to say."

Vidor was delighted with the vitality of Audrey Hepburn's performance as Natasha Rostova, in contrast to the miscasting of the male leads. His assessment of the centrality of Natasha is based in the process of her maturation:

"Natasha permeated [War and Peace's] entire structure as the archetype of womankind which she so thoroughly represents. If I were forced to reduce the whole story of War and Peace to some basically simple statement, I would say that it is a story of the maturing of Natasha. She represents, to me, the anima of the story and she hovers over it all like immortality itself."

Cinematographer Jack Cardiff devised one of the film's most visually striking sequences, the sunrise duel between Pierre (Henry Fonda) and Kuragin (Tullio Carminati), shot entirely on a sound-stage. Vidor performed second-production duties to oversee the spectacular battle reenactments and director Mario Soldati (uncredited) shot a number of scenes with the principal cast.

American audiences showed modest enthusiasm at the box-office, but War and Peace was well received by film critics. The movie was met with huge popular approval in the USSR, a fact alarming to Soviet officials, coming as it did near the height of Cold War hostilities between America and Russia. The Soviet government responded in 1967 with its own heavily financed adaptation of the novel, War and Peace (film series) (1967).

War and Peace garnered Vidor further offers to film historical epics, among these King of Kings (1961), (directed by Nicholas Ray) as well as a project to develop a script about the life of 16th Century Spanish author Miguel Cervantes. Vidor finally settled on the Old Testament story of Solomon and Sheba, with Tyrone Power and Gina Lollobrigida tapped as the star-crossed monarchs. This would be Vidor's final Hollywood film of his career.

=== Solomon and Sheba (1959) ===
Solomon and Sheba is one of a cycle of bible-based epics popular favored by Hollywood during the 1950s. The film is best remembered as the Vidor's last commercial production of his long career in Hollywood.

A tragic footnote is attached to this picture. Six weeks into production the leading man, 45-year-old star Tyrone Power, suffered a heart attack during a climactic sword fight scene. He died within the hour. Considered the "ultimate nightmare" for any major movie production, the entire film had to be re-shot, with the lead role of Solomon now recast with Yul Brynner. The death of Power was less a financial disaster and more a creative loss. Vidor was bereft of an actor who had grasped the complex nature of the Solomon figure, adding depth to Power's performance. Brynner and Vidor were instantly at loggerheads when the leading man substituted a portrayal of an "anguished monarch" for an Israelite king who would "dominate each situation without conflict." Vidor reported, "it was an attitude that affected the depth of his performance and probably the integrity of the film." Leading lady Gina Lollobrigida adopted Brynner's approach to her character development of her Queen of Sheba, adding another facet of discord with the director.

Solomon and Sheba includes some impressive action sequences, including a widely cited battle finale in which Solomon's tiny army faces an approaching onslaught of mounted warriors. His troops turn their burnished shields to the sun, the reflected light blinding the enemy hordes and sending them careening into an abyss. Astonishing sequences such as these abound in Vidor's work, prompting film historian Andrew Sarris to observe "Vidor was a director for anthologies [who] created more great moments and fewer great films than any director of his rank." Despite the setbacks that plagued the production and the ballooning costs associated with the reshoot, Solomon and Sheba "more than earned back its costs."

Contrary to claims that Solomon and Sheba ended Vidor's career, he continued to receive offers to film major productions after its completion. The reasons for the director's disengagement from commercial film-making are related to his age (65) and to his desire to pursue smaller and more personal movie projects. Reflecting on independent productions, Vidor remarked, "I'm glad I got out of it."

=== Post-Hollywood projects, 1959–1981 ===
==== Truth and Illusion: An Introduction to Metaphysics (1964) ====
In the mid-1960s Vidor crafted a 26-minute 16mm movie that sets forth his philosophy on the nature of individual perception. Narrated by the director, and quoting from theologian-philosophers Jonathan Edwards and Bishop Berkeley, the images serve to complement the abstract ideas he sets forth. The film is a discourse on subjective idealism, which maintains that the material world is an illusion, existing only in the human mind: humanity creates the world they experience.

As Vidor describes in Whitmanesque terms:

"Nature gets the credit for what in truth should be reserved for ourselves: the rose for its scent, the nightingale for its song, the sun for its radiance. The poets are entirely mistaken; they should address their lyrics to themselves and should turn them into odes of self-congratulation."

Truth and Illusion provides an insight into the significance of Vidor's themes in his work, and is consistent with his Christian Science precepts.

Micheal Neary served as assistant director on the film, and Fred Y. Smith completed the editing. The movie was never released commercially.

==== The Metaphor: King Vidor meets with Andrew Wyeth (1980) ====
Vidor's documentary The Metaphor consists of a number of interviews between the director and painter Andrew Wyeth. Wyeth had contacted Vidor in the late 1970s expressing admiration for his work. The artist emphasized that much of his material had been inspired by the director's 1925 war-romance The Big Parade.

The documentary records the discussions between Vidor and both Wyeth and his spouse Betsy. A montage is formed by inter-cutting images of Wyeth's paintings with short clips from Vidor's The Big Parade. Vidor attempts to reveal an "inner metaphor" demonstrating the sources of artistic inspiration.

Considering the film only a work in progress at the time of his death, the documentary had its premiere at the American Film Institute in 1980. It was never given a general release and is rarely screened.

=== Unproduced film projects ===
Northwest Passage (Book 2): Vidor attempted to make a sequel to his film Northwest Passage in which Rogers' Rangers find the Northwest Passage, although filming never began because author Kenneth Roberts refused to cooperate with the project, and because MGM thought the cost in making the first film in Technicolor had proven prohibitive enough.

Bright Light (late 1950s): a biographical study of Christian Science founder Mary Baker Eddy.

Conquest (formerly The Milly Story): In 1960, Vidor resumed efforts to make a sound version of his 1919 The Turn in the Road. His reconceived screenplay concerns a Hollywood director disillusioned with the film industry who inherits a gas station from his father in the fictional Colorado town of "Arcadia". The script's dialogue contains oblique references to a number of Vidor's silent films including (The Big Parade (1925) and The Crowd (1928)). Conquest introduces a mysterious young woman, "a feminine archetype" (a figure in Jungian philosophy) who serves as "the answer to everyone's problems" while pumping gas at the station. She disappears suddenly, leaving the director inspired, and he returns to Hollywood. Impressed by Italian director Federico Fellini's 8 ½ (1963), Vidor briefly corresponded with Fellini while writing Conquest. Vidor soon abandoned his 15-year effort to make the "unfashionable" movie, despite Sid Grauman – like Vidor an adherent to Christian Science – having purchased the rights. Even the modest budgetary requests were rejected by the tiny Allied Artists and they dropped the project.

The Marble Faun: a "quite faithful" version of the 1860 story by Nathaniel Hawthorne.

The Crowd: Vidor developed revisions of his 1928 silent masterpiece, including a 1960s sequel of Ann Head's 1967 novel Mr and Mrs Bo Jo Jones (made as a TV feature without his input), and in the early 1970s another effort, Brother Jon.

A Man Called Cervantes: Vidor was involved in script writing for an adaptation of Bruno Frank's novel, but withdrew from the project, unhappy with script changes. The movie was shot and released in 1967 as Cervantes, but Vidor withdrew his name from the production.

William Desmond Taylor: Vidor researched the murder of silent era actor-director William Desmond Taylor, killed under mysterious circumstances in 1922. Though no screenplay was forthcoming, author Sidney D. Kirkpatrick alleges in his novel, A Cast of Killers (1986), that Vidor solved the murder.

The Actor: In 1979, Vidor sought financing for a biography of the ill-fated James Murray, star of Vidor's The Crowd (1928).

==== Academic Presentations ====
Vidor lectured occasionally on film production and directing in the late 1950s and the 1960s at the University of California, Los Angeles and the University of Southern California. He published a non-technical handbook providing anecdotes from his film career, On Film Making, in 1972.

=== Vidor as actor: Love and Money (1982) ===
Vidor served as an 'extra" or made cameo appearances during his film career. An early film still exists from an unidentified Hotex Motion Picture Company silent short made in 1914, when he was 19 years old (he wears a Keystone Cop costume and false beard). While attempting to break into Hollywood as a director and screenwriter, Vidor took "bit parts" for Vitagraph Studios and Inceville in 1915–1916. During the height of his fame he made a number of cameo appearances in his own films, including The Patsy in 1926, Show People in 1928, and Our Daily Bread in 1934.

He did not appear as a featured actor until 1981, at the age of 85. Vidor provided a "charming" tongue-in-cheek portrayal of Walter Klein, a senile grandfather, in director James Toback's Love and Money. Vidor's motivation in accepting the role was a desire to observe contemporary movie-making technology. Love and Money was released in 1982, shortly before Vidor's death.

== Personal life ==
In 1944 Vidor, a Republican, joined the anti-communist Motion Picture Alliance for the Preservation of American Ideals.

Vidor published his autobiography, A Tree is a Tree, in 1953. This book's title is inspired by an incident early in Vidor's Hollywood career. Vidor wanted to film a movie in the locations where its story was set, a decision which would have greatly added to the film's production budget. A budget-minded producer told him, "A rock is a rock. A tree is a tree. Shoot it in Griffith Park" (a nearby public space which was frequently used for filming exterior shots).

King Vidor was a Christian Scientist and wrote occasionally for church publications.

=== Marriages ===
Vidor was married three times and had three daughters:

1. Florence Arto (m. 1915–1924)
  - (later married Jascha Heifetz)
  - Suzanne (1918–2003)
  - (adopted by Jascha Heifetz)
2. Eleanor Boardman (m. 1926–1931)
  - Antonia (1927–2012)
  - Belinda (1930–2023)
3. Elizabeth Hill (m. 1932–1978)

== Death ==
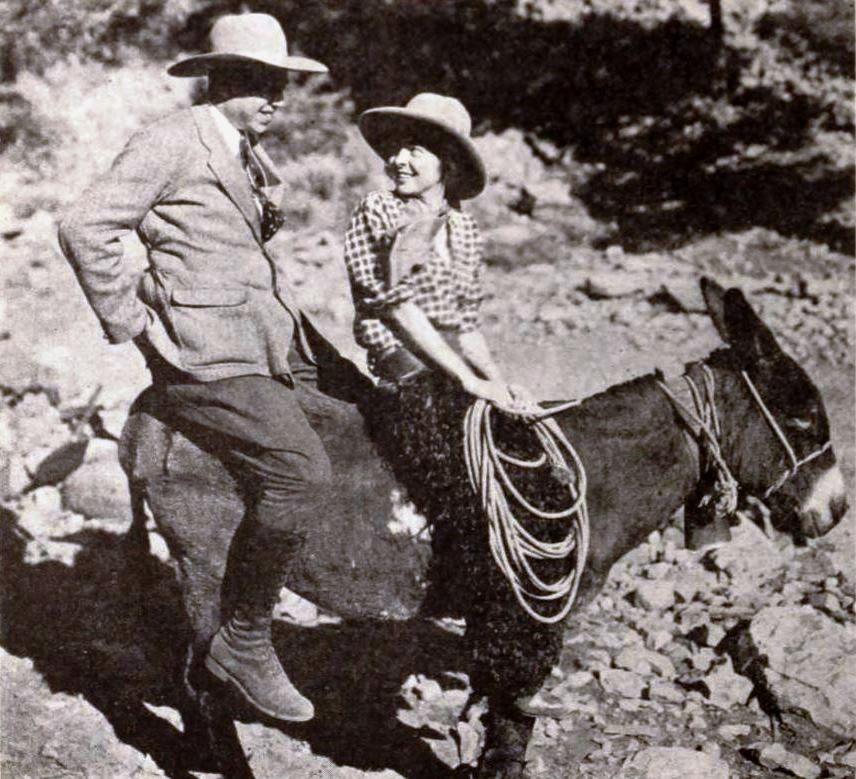
King Vidor and Colleen Moore on the set of The Sky Pilot (1921)

"King Vidor died of a heart attack on November 1, 1982. The previous weekend he and his longtime friend [and former lover in their early careers] Colleen Moore had driven up to San Simeon, William Randolph Hearst's "Castle", to watch home movies made when they had been Hearst's guests there, sixty years before."

Vidor died at age 88 of a heart attack at his ranch in Paso Robles, California, on November 1, 1982.

== Filmography ==
- The Grand Military Parade (1913)
- Hurricane in Galveston (1913)
- The Intrigue (1916) (*as young actor)
- The Lost Lie (1918)
- Bud's Recruit (1918)
- The Chocolate of the Gang (1918)
- Tad's Swimming Hole (1918)
- The Accusing Toe (1918)
- I'm a Man (1918)
- The Turn in the Road (1919)
- Better Times (1919) (as King W. Vidor)
- The Other Half (1919) (as King W. Vidor)
- Poor Relations (1919)
- The Family Honor (1920) (as King W. Vidor)
- The Jack-Knife Man (1920)
- The Sky Pilot (1921)
- Love Never Dies (1921)
- The Real Adventure (1922)
- Dusk to Dawn (1922)
- Conquering the Woman (1922)
- Peg o' My Heart (1922)
- The Woman of Bronze (1923)
- Three Wise Fools (1923)
- Wild Oranges (1924)
- Happiness (1924)
- Wine of Youth (1924)
- His Hour (1924)
- The Wife of the Centaur (1924)
- Proud Flesh (1925)
- The Big Parade (1925)
- La Bohème (1926)
- Bardelys the Magnificent (1926)
- The Crowd (1928)
- The Patsy, also known as The Politic Flapper (1928)
- Show People (1928)
- Hallelujah (1929)
- Not So Dumb (1930)
- Billy the Kid, US TV title The Highwayman Rides (1930)
- Street Scene (1931)
- The Champ (1931)
- Bird of Paradise (1932)
- Cynara (1932) US reissue title I Was Faithful
- The Stranger's Return (1933)
- Our Daily Bread (1934)
- The Wedding Night (1935)
- So Red the Rose (1935)
- The Texas Rangers (1936)
- Stella Dallas (1937)
- The Citadel (1938)
- The Wizard of Oz (1939) (Kansas scenes only) (uncredited)
- Northwest Passage (1940)
- Comrade X (1940)
- H. M. Pulham, Esq. (1941)
- An American Romance (1944)
- Duel in the Sun (1946)
- On Our Merry Way, also known as A Miracle Can Happen (1948)
- The Fountainhead (1949)
- Beyond the Forest (1949)
- Lightning Strikes Twice (1951)
- Japanese War Bride (1952)
- Ruby Gentry (1952)
- Light's Diamond Jubilee (1954) (TV)
- Man Without a Star (1955)
- War and Peace (1956)
- Solomon and Sheba (1959)
- Truth and Illusion (1964)
- The Metaphor (1980)

== Academy Awards and nominations ==
Year	Award	Film	Result
1927–28	Best Director	The Crowd	Frank Borzage – 7th Heaven
1929–30	Best Director	Hallelujah	Lewis Milestone – All Quiet on the Western Front
1931–32	Best Director	The Champ	Frank Borzage – Bad Girl
1938	Best Director	The Citadel	Frank Capra – You Can't Take It with You
1956	Best Director	War and Peace	George Stevens – Giant
1979	Academy Honorary Award	for his incomparable achievements as a cinematic creator and innovator	

=== Directed Academy Award performances ===
Year	Performer	Film	Result
Academy Award for Best Actor
1931–32	Wallace Beery	The Champ	Won
1938	Robert Donat	The Citadel	Nominated
Academy Award for Best Actress
1937	Barbara Stanwyck	Stella Dallas	Nominated
1946	Jennifer Jones	Duel in the Sun	Nominated
Academy Award for Best Supporting Actress
1937	Anne Shirley	Stella Dallas	Nominated
1946	Lillian Gish	Duel in the Sun	Nominated

=== Academy Awards in King Vidor films ===
Year	Film	Academy Award Nominations	Academy Award wins
1927–28	The Crowd	2	0
1929–30	Hallelujah	1	0
1931–32	The Champ	4	2
1936	The Texas Rangers	1	0
1938	The Citadel	4	0
1940	Northwest Passage	1	0
1940	Comrade X	1	0
1946	Duel in the Sun	2	0
1949	Beyond the Forest	1	0
1956	War and Peace	3	0

=== Other awards ===
In 1964, he received the Golden Plate Award of the American Academy of Achievement. At the 11th Moscow International Film Festival in 1979, he was awarded with the Honorable Prize for his contribution to cinema. In 2020, Vidor was honored with a retrospective at the 70th Berlin International Film Festival, showcasing more than 30 of his films. A one block street near the 20th Century Fox Studio in Los Angeles is named Vidor drive.
