= List of American films of 1918 =

Including foreign productions, the total number of feature-length motion pictures released in the U.S. in 1918 is at least 841.

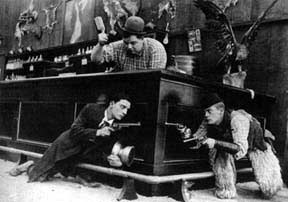
Out West

== A–B ==
Title	Director	Cast	Genre	Notes
$5,000 Reward	Douglas Gerrard	Franklyn Farnum, J. Farrell MacDonald, Lule Warrenton	Mystery	Universal
Ace High	Lynn Reynolds	Tom Mix, Kathleen O'Connor	Western	Fox
The Accidental Honeymoon	Léonce Perret	Robert Warwick, Elaine Hammerstein, Edward Kimball	Comedy	Independent
After the War	Joseph De Grasse	Grace Cunard, Edward Cecil, Fontaine La Rue	Drama	Universal
Ali Baba and the Forty Thieves	Sidney Franklin, Chester Franklin	George Stone, Gertrude Messinger	Adventure	Fox
Alias Mary Brown	Henri D'Elba	Pauline Starke, Casson Ferguson, Arthur Millett	Drama	Triangle
All Man	Paul Scardon	Harry T. Morey, Betty Blythe	Drama	Vitagraph
All Night	Paul Powell	Carmel Myers, Rudolph Valentino, Charles Dorian	Comedy drama	Universal
All Woman	Hobart Henley	Mae Marsh, Jere Austin	Comedy	Goldwyn
All the World to Nothing	Henry King	William Russell, Winifred Westover, J. Morris Foster	Comedy	Pathe Exchange
Amarilly of Clothes-Line Alley	Marshall Neilan	Mary Pickford, William Scott, Kate Price	Drama	Paramount
American Buds	Kenean Buel	Jane Lee, Albert Gran	Comedy	Fox
An Alien Enemy	Wallace Worsley	Louise Glaum, Mary Jane Irving, Thurston Hall	War drama	Hodkinson
An American Live Wire	Thomas R. Mills	Earle Williams, Grace Darmond	Comedy	Vitagraph
An Honest Man	Frank Borzage	William Desmond, Ann Forrest	Comedy	Triangle
Annexing Bill	Albert Parker	Gladys Hulette, Creighton Hale	Comedy	Pathe Exchange
Ann's Finish	Lloyd Ingraham	Margarita Fischer, Jack Mower	Drama	Mutual
The Answer	E. Mason Hopper	Alma Rubens, Francis McDonald, Jean Hersholt	Drama	World
Appearance of Evil	Lawrence C. Windom	June Elvidge, Frank Mayo	Drama	World
The Argument	Walter Edwards	J. Barney Sherry, Pauline Starke	Mystery	Triangle
Arizona	Albert Parker	Douglas Fairbanks, Theodore Roberts	Drama	Paramount
Ashes of Love	Ivan Abramson	James K. Hackett, Effie Shannon, Rubye De Remer	Drama	Independent
At the Mercy of Men	Charles Miller	Alice Brady, Frank Morgan, Jack W. Johnston	Drama	Selznick
The Atom	Frank Borzage	Pauline Starke, Belle Bennett	Drama	Triangle
A Bachelor's Children	Paul Scardon	Harry T. Morey, Alice Terry	Drama	Vitagraph
Back to the Woods	George Irving	Mabel Normand, Herbert Rawlinson	Comedy	Goldwyn
Battling Jane	Elmer Clifton	Dorothy Gish, Katherine MacDonald, Bertram Grassby	Drama	Paramount
Beans	John Francis Dillon	Edith Roberts, Lew Cody, Charles K. Gerrard	Comedy	Universal
The Beautiful Mrs. Reynolds	Arthur Ashley	June Elvidge, Carlyle Blackwell	Historical	World
Beauty and the Rogue	Henry King	Mary Miles Minter, Allan Forrest	Crime drama	Mutual
Beauty in Chains	Elsie Jane Wilson	Ella Hall, Emory Johnson	Drama	Universal
The Belgian	Sidney Olcott	Valentine Grant, Walker Whiteside, Anders Randolf	War	Independent
Believe Me, Xantippe	Donald Crisp	Wallace Reid, Ann Little, Noah Beery	Comedy	Paramount
The Bells	Ernest C. Warde	Frank Keenan, Lois Wilson, Carl Stockdale	Drama	Pathe Exchange
The Beloved Blackmailer	Dell Henderson	Carlyle Blackwell, Evelyn Greeley	Comedy	World
The Beloved Impostor	Joseph Gleason	Gladys Leslie, Huntley Gordon, Denton Vane	Drama	Vitagraph
The Beloved Traitor	William Worthington	Mae Marsh, E.K. Lincoln, Hedda Hopper	Drama	Goldwyn
Berlin Via America	Francis Ford	Francis Ford, Donald Keith	War drama	Independent
The Better Half	John S. Robertson	Alice Brady, Crauford Kent	Drama	Selznick
Betty Takes a Hand	John Francis Dillon	Olive Thomas, Frederick Vroom	Drama	Triangle
Beyond the Shadows	James McLaughlin	William Desmond, Josie Sedgwick	Drama	Triangle
The Biggest Show on Earth	Jerome Storm	Enid Bennett, Ethel Lynne	Drama	Paramount
The Bird of Prey	Edward LeSaint	Gladys Brockwell, Herbert Heyes, Lee Shumway	Drama	Fox
The Birth of a Race	John W. Noble	Louis Dean, Doris Doscher	Drama	Independent
A Bit of Jade	Edward Sloman	Mary Miles Minter, Allan Forrest	Comedy	Mutual
The Blind Adventure	Wesley Ruggles	Edward Earle, Eulalie Jensen	Mystery	Vitagraph
Blindfolded	Raymond B. West	Bessie Barriscale, Joseph J. Dowling, Edward Coxen	Crime	Hodkinson
The Blindness of Divorce	Frank Lloyd	Charles Clary, Rhea Mitchell, Nancy Caswell	Drama	Fox
The Blue Bird	Maurice Tourneur	Tula Belle, Gertrude McCoy	Fantasy	Paramount
'Blue Blazes' Rawden	William S. Hart	William S. Hart, Maude George, Robert McKim	Drama	Paramount
Blue Blood	Eliot Howe	Howard Hickman, George Fisher	Drama	Goldwyn
Blue-Eyed Mary	Harry Millarde	June Caprice, Helen Tracy	Drama	Fox
Bonnie Annie Laurie	Harry F. Millarde	Peggy Hyland, Henry Hallam	Drama	Fox
The Border Legion	T. Hayes Hunter	Blanche Bates, Hobart Bosworth, Russell Simpson	Western	Goldwyn
The Border Wireless	William S. Hart	William S. Hart, Wanda Hawley, Charles Arling	Western	Paramount
Borrowed Clothes	Lois Weber	Mildred Harris, Lew Cody	Drama	Universal
Boston Blackie's Little Pal	E. Mason Hopper	Bert Lytell, Rhea Mitchell, Rosemary Theby	Crime	Metro
Bound in Morocco	Allan Dwan	Douglas Fairbanks, Pauline Curley, Edythe Chapman	Adventure	Paramount
Brace Up	Elmer Clifton	Herbert Rawlinson, Claire Du Brey	Drama	Universal
Branding Broadway	William S. Hart	William S. Hart, Seena Owen, Arthur Shirley	Western	Paramount
The Brass Check	Will S. Davis	Francis X. Bushman, Beverly Bayne	Comedy	Metro
Brave and Bold	Carl Harbaugh	George Walsh, Dan Mason	Comedy	Fox
The Bravest Way	George Melford	Sessue Hayakawa, Florence Vidor, Tsuru Aoki	Drama	Paramount
The Brazen Beauty	Tod Browning	Priscilla Dean, Gertrude Astor, Thurston Hall	Comedy	Universal
Bread	Ida May Park	Mary MacLaren, Edward Cecil, Kenneth Harlan	Drama	Universal
Breakers Ahead	Charles Brabin	Viola Dana, Clifford Bruce, Mabel Van Buren	Drama	Metro
The Bride of Fear	Sidney Franklin	Jewel Carmen, Charles Gorman	Drama	Fox
The Bride's Awakening	Robert Z. Leonard	Mae Murray, Lew Cody, Clarissa Selwynne	Drama	Universal
Broadway Bill	Fred J. Balshofer	Harold Lockwood, May Allison	Drama	Metro
Broadway Love	Ida May Park	Dorothy Phillips, Juanita Hansen, Lon Chaney	Romance	Universal
A Broadway Scandal	Joe De Grasse	Lon Chaney, Carmel Myers	Comedy	Universal
Broken Ties	Arthur Ashley	June Elvidge, Montagu Love	Drama	World
Brown of Harvard	Harry Beaumont	Tom Moore, Hazel Daly, Walter McGrail	Sports	Selig
Buchanan's Wife	Charles Brabin	Virginia Pearson, Marc McDermott, Victor Sutherland	Drama	Fox
The Burden of Proof	Julius Steger	Marion Davies	Drama	Selznick
A Burglar for a Night	Ernest C. Warde	J. Warren Kerrigan, Lois Wilson	Comedy	Hodkinson
The Business of Life	Tom Terriss	Alice Joyce, Betty Blythe, Walter McGrail	Drama	Vitagraph
By Hook or Crook	Dell Henderson	Carlyle Blackwell, Evelyn Greeley, Jack Drumier	Comedy	World
By Proxy	Clifford Smith	Roy Stewart, Maude Wayne	Western	Triangle
By Right of Purchase	Charles Miller	Norma Talmadge, Eugene O'Brien, Ida Darling	Drama	Selznick
By the World Forgot	David Smith	Hedda Nova, Patricia Palmer, Otto Lederer	Drama	Vitagraph

== C–D ==
Title	Director	Cast	Genre	Notes
The Cabaret	Harley Knoles	June Elvidge, Montagu Love, Carlyle Blackwell	Drama	World
The Cabaret Girl	Douglas Gerrard	Ruth Clifford, Carmen Phillips, Ashton Dearholt	Drama	Universal
Cactus Crandall	Clifford Smith	Roy Stewart, Pete Morrison	Western	Triangle
The Caillaux Case	Richard Stanton	Madlaine Traverse, George Majeroni	Drama	Fox
A Camouflage Kiss	Harry F. Millarde	June Caprice, Pell Trenton	Comedy	Fox
Captain of His Soul	Gilbert P. Hamilton	William Desmond, Claire McDowell, Jack Richardson	Mystery	Triangle
Carmen of the Klondike	Reginald Barker	Clara Williams, Herschel Mayall, Edward Coxen	Adventure	Independent
The Cast-Off	Raymond B. West	Bessie Barriscale, Howard Hickman	Drama	Triangle
Caught in the Act	Harry F. Millarde	Peggy Hyland, Leslie Austin	Comedy	Fox
Cavanaugh of the Forest Rangers	William Wolbert	Nell Shipman, Gayne Whitman, Otto Lederer	Drama	Vitagraph
Cecilia of the Pink Roses	Julius Steger	Marion Davies, Harry Benham, Willette Kershaw	Drama	Selznick
The Challenge Accepted	Edwin L. Hollywood	Zena Keefe, Charles Eldridge, Russell Simpson	Drama	Hodkinson
The Changing Woman	David Smith	Hedda Nova, J. Frank Glendon, Otto Lederer	Comedy	Vitagraph
Cheating the Public	Richard Stanton	Enid Markey, Ralph Lewis	Drama	Fox
The City of Dim Faces	George Melford	Sessue Hayakawa, Marin Sais, Doris Pawn	Drama	Paramount
The City of Purple Dreams	Colin Campbell	Tom Santschi, Bessie Eyton, Fritzi Brunette	Drama	Selig
The City of Tears	Elsie Jane Wilson	Carmel Myers, Edwin August, Leatrice Joy	Comedy drama	Universal
The Claim	Frank Reicher	Edith Storey, Wheeler Oakman, Mignon Anderson	Western	Metro
The Claw	Robert G. Vignola	Clara Kimball Young, Milton Sills, Jack Holt	Drama	Selznick
The Claws of the Hun	Victor Schertzinger	Charles Ray, Jane Novak, Robert McKim	Drama	Paramount
The Clutch of Circumstance	Henry Houry	Corinne Griffith, Robert Gaillard	Drama	Vitagraph
Closin' In	James McLaughlin	William Desmond, Maude Wayne	Drama	Triangle
Coals of Fire	Victor Schertzinger	Enid Bennett, Fred Niblo, Melbourne MacDowell	Drama	Paramount
Code of the Yukon	Bertram Bracken	Mitchell Lewis, Tom Santschi	Drama	Selznick
Come On In	John Emerson	Shirley Mason, Ernest Truex	Comedy	Paramount
Confession	Sidney Franklin	Jewel Carmen, Lee Shumway	Drama	Fox
Conquered Hearts	Francis J. Grandon	Marguerite Marsh, Harry Myers	Drama	Independent
Convict 993	William Parke	Irene Castle, Warner Oland, Helene Chadwick	Drama	Pathe Exchange
The Craving	John Ford	Francis Ford, Duke Worne	Drama	Universal
The Cross Bearer	George Archainbaud	Montagu Love, Jeanne Eagels	Drama	World
Crown Jewels	Roy Clements	Claire Anderson, Lillian Langdon	Drama	Triangle
The Cruise of the Make-Believes	George Melford	Lila Lee, Harrison Ford, Raymond Hackett	Drama	Paramount
Cupid by Proxy	William Bertram	Marie Osborne, Mildred Harris	Comedy	Pathe Exchange
Cupid's Round Up	Edward LeSaint	Tom Mix, Wanda Hawley	Western	Fox
The Curse of Iku	Frank Borzage	Frank Borzage, Tsuru Aoki, Thomas Kurihara	Drama	Essanay
Cyclone Higgins, D.D.	Christy Cabanne	Francis X. Bushman, Beverly Bayne	Comedy	Metro
Daddy's Girl	William Bertram	Marie Osborne, Lew Cody	Drama	Pathe Exchange
The Danger Game	Harry A. Pollard	Madge Kennedy, Tom Moore	Comedy	Goldwyn
Danger, Go Slow	Robert Z. Leonard	Mae Murray, Jack Mulhall, Lon Chaney	Comedy	Universal
The Danger Mark	Hugh Ford	Elsie Ferguson, Mahlon Hamilton, Crauford Kent	Drama	Paramount
Danger Within	Rae Berger	Zoe Rae, Winifred Greenwood	Drama	Universal
The Danger Zone	Frank Beal	Madlaine Traverse, Fritzi Ridgeway	Drama	Fox
The Daredevil	Francis J. Grandon	Gail Kane, Norman Trevor	Drama	Mutual Film
Daughter Angele	William C. Dowlan	Pauline Starke, Philo McCullough	Drama	Triangle
A Daughter of France	Edmund Lawrence	Virginia Pearson, Hugh Thompson	Drama	Fox
A Daughter of the Old South	Émile Chautard	Pauline Frederick, Pedro de Cordoba	Drama	Paramount
A Daughter of the West	William Bertram	Marie Osborne, Leota Lorraine	Western	Pathe Exchange
The Dawn of Understanding	David Smith	Bessie Love, John Gilbert	Western	Vitagraph
Daybreak	Albert Capellani	Emily Stevens, Julian L'Estrange	Drama	Metro
De Luxe Annie	Roland West	Norma Talmadge, Eugene O'Brien, Frank R. Mills	Drama	Selznick
The Death Dance	J. Searle Dawley	Alice Brady, Holmes Herbert, Mahlon Hamilton	Drama	Selznick
The Debt of Honor	Oscar Lund	Peggy Hyland, Eric Mayne	Drama	Fox
The Deciding Kiss	Tod Browning	Edith Roberts, Hallam Cooley	Comedy	Universal
The Demon	George D. Baker	Edith Storey, Charles K. Gerrard	Comedy	Metro
Denny from Ireland	William Clifford	Shorty Hamilton, Ellen Terry	Comedy	Independent
Desert Law	Jack Conway	Gayne Whitman, Jack Richardson, George C. Pearce	Western	Triangle
A Desert Wooing	Jerome Storm	Enid Bennett, Jack Holt	Drama	Paramount
The Desired Woman	Paul Scardon	Harry T. Morey, Florence Deshon, Jean Paige	Drama	Vitagraph
Doing Their Bit	Kenean Buel	Jane Lee, Franklyn Hanna	Comedy	Fox
A Doll's House	Maurice Tourneur	Elsie Ferguson, Holmes Herbert	Drama	Paramount
Dolly Does Her Bit	William Bertram	Marie Osborne, Ernest Morrison	Comedy	Pathe Exchange
Dolly's Vacation	William Bertram	Marie Osborne, Ernest Morrison	Comedy	Pathe Exchange
Deuce Duncan	Thomas N. Heffron	William Desmond, Louella Maxam	Western	Triangle
The Devil's Wheel	Edward LeSaint	Gladys Brockwell, William Scott	Drama	Fox
A Diplomatic Mission	Jack Conway	Earle Williams, Grace Darmond, Leslie Stuart	Comedy	Vitagraph
The Divine Sacrifice	George Archainbaud	Kitty Gordon, Selene Johnson	Drama	World Film
The Doctor and the Woman	Phillips Smalley, Lois Weber	Mildred Harris, True Boardman, Alan Roscoe	Mystery	Universal
Dodging a Million	George Loane Tucker	Mabel Normand, Tom Moore	Comedy	Goldwyn
The Dream Lady	Elsie Jane Wilson	Carmel Myers, Thomas Holding, Harry von Meter	Comedy	Universal

== E–F ==
Title	Director	Cast	Genre	Notes
The Eagle	Elmer Clifton	Monroe Salisbury, Alfred Allen	Western	Universal
The Eleventh Commandment	Ralph Ince	Lucille Lee Stewart, Carleton Macy	Drama	Independent
The Embarrassment of Riches	Edward Dillon	Lillian Walker	Comedy	Independent
The Empty Cab	Douglas Gerrard	Franklyn Farnum, Eileen Percy	Mystery	Universal
Empty Pockets	Herbert Brenon	Bert Lytell, Barbara Castleton	Mystery	First National
Eve's Daughter	James Kirkwood	Billie Burke, Thomas Meighan, Lionel Atwill	Comedy	Paramount
Every Mother's Son	Raoul Walsh	Charlotte Walker, Percy Standing	War	Fox
Everybody's Girl	Tom Terriss	Alice Joyce, Walter McGrail	Comedy	Vitagraph
Everywoman's Husband	Gilbert P. Hamilton	Gloria Swanson, Joe King, Lillian Langdon	Drama	Triangle
Eye for Eye	Albert Capellani	Alla Nazimova, Charles Bryant, Sally Crute	Drama	Metro
The Eyes of Julia Deep	Lloyd Ingraham	Mary Miles Minter, Allan Forrest	Comedy drama	Pathe Exchange
The Eyes of Mystery	Tod Browning	Edith Storey, Bradley Barker	Mystery	Metro
The Face in the Dark	Hobart Henley	Mae Marsh, Niles Welch, Alec B. Francis	Mystery	Goldwyn
Face Value	Robert Z. Leonard	Mae Murray, Wheeler Oakman	Drama	Universal
Fair Enough	Edward Sloman	Margarita Fischer, Eugenie Forde	Comedy	Pathé Exchange
The Fair Pretender	Charles Miller	Madge Kennedy, Tom Moore, Robert Walker	Drama	Goldwyn
Faith Endurin'	Clifford Smith	Roy Stewart, Fritzi Ridgeway	Western	Triangle
Fallen Angel	Robert Thornby	Jewel Carmen, Charles Clary, Lee Shumway	Drama	Fox
False Ambition	Gilbert P. Hamilton	Alma Rubens, Peggy Pearce	Drama	Triangle
Fame and Fortune	Lynn Reynolds	Tom Mix, Kathleen O'Connor	Western	Fox
The Family Skeleton	Victor Schertzinger, Jerome Storm	Charles Ray, Sylvia Breamer, Andrew Arbuckle	Drama	Paramount
Fan Fan	Chester M. Franklin, Sidney Franklin	Virginia Lee Corbin, Francis Carpenter, Gertrude Messinger	Comedy	Fox
Fast Company	Lynn Reynolds	Lon Chaney, Franklyn Farnum, Juanita Hansen	Comedy	Universal
Fedora	Edward José	Pauline Frederick, Alfred Hickman	Drama	Paramount
Fields of Honor	Ralph Ince	Mae Marsh, Marguerite Marsh	Drama	Goldwyn
The Fighting Grin	Joseph De Grasse	Franklyn Farnum, Edith Johnson, J. Morris Foster	Western comedy	Universal
Find the Woman	Tom Terriss	Alice Joyce, Walter McGrail, Henry Houry	Drama	Vitagraph
The Firebrand	Edmund Lawrence	Virginia Pearson, Carleton Macy, Herbert Evans	Drama	Fox
The Firefly of France	Donald Crisp	Wallace Reid, Ann Little, Raymond Hatton	Drama	Paramount
Fires of Youth	Rupert Julian	Ruth Clifford, Ralph Lewis	Drama	Universal
The First Law	Lawrence McGill	Irene Castle, Antonio Moreno	Mystery	Pathe Exchange
Five Thousand an Hour	Ralph Ince	Hale Hamilton, Lucille Lee Stewart	Comedy	Metro
The Flames of Chance	Raymond Wells	Margery Wilson, Jack Mulhall	Comedy	Triangle
Flare-Up Sal	Roy William Neill	Dorothy Dalton, Thurston Hall	Drama	Paramount
The Flash of Fate	Elmer Clifton	Herbert Rawlinson, Sally Starr, Jack Nelson	Crime	Universal
The Floor Below	Clarence G. Badger	Mabel Normand, Tom Moore	Comedy	Goldwyn
Flower of the Dusk	John H. Collins	Viola Dana, Howard Hall	Drama	Metro
The Fly God	Clifford Smith	Roy Stewart, Claire Anderson	Western	Triangle
For Freedom	Frank Lloyd	William Farnum, Coit Albertson, Rubye De Remer	Drama	Fox
For the Freedom of the East	Ira M. Lowry	Robert Elliott, Lady Tsen Mei	Drama	Goldwyn
For Husbands Only	Lois Weber, Phillips Smalley	Mildred Harris, Lew Cody, Kathleen Kirkham	Comedy drama	Universal
For Sale	Fred E. Wright	Gladys Hulette, Creighton Hale, Helene Chadwick	Drama	Pathe Exchange
The Forbidden City	Sidney Franklin	Norma Talmadge, Thomas Meighan	Drama	Selznick
The Forbidden Path	J. Gordon Edwards	Theda Bara, Walter Law	Drama	Fox
Free and Equal	Roy William Neill	Charles K. French, Gloria Hope, Lydia Knott	Drama	Independent
Friend Husband	Clarence G. Badger	Madge Kennedy, Rockliffe Fellowes	Comedy drama	Goldwyn
From Two to Six	Albert Parker	Winifred Allen, Earle Foxe, Forrest Robinson	Comedy drama	Triangle
Fuss and Feathers	Fred Niblo	Enid Bennett, Douglas MacLean	Comedy	Paramount

== G–H ==
Title	Director	Cast	Genre	Notes
A Game with Fate	Paul Scardon	Harry T. Morey, Betty Blythe, Denton Vane	Mystery	Vitagraph
The Gates of Gladness	Harley Knoles	Madge Evans, Gerda Holmes, George MacQuarrie	Drama	World
A Gentleman's Agreement	David Smith	Gayne Whitman, Nell Shipman	Drama	Vitagraph
The Ghost Flower	Frank Borzage	Alma Rubens, Francis McDonald	Drama	Triangle
The Ghost of Rosy Taylor	Edward Sloman	Mary Miles Minter, Allan Forrest, George Periolat	Drama	Pathe Exchange
The Ghost of Slumber Mountain	Willis O'Brien	Herbert M. Dawley, Willis O'Brien	Fantasy	World
The Ghost of the Rancho	William Worthington	Bryant Washburn, Rhea Mitchell, Joseph J. Dowling	Western	Pathe Exchange
The Ghosts of Yesterday	Charles Miller	Norma Talmadge, Eugene O'Brien, Stuart Holmes	Drama	Selznick
The Girl and the Judge	John B. O'Brien	Olive Tell, David Powell	Drama	Mutual
The Girl from Beyond	William Wolbert	Nell Shipman, Gayne Whitman	Drama	Vitagraph
The Girl from Bohemia	Lawrence B. McGill	Irene Castle, Edward Cecil	Comedy	Pathe Exchange
The Girl in His House	Thomas R. Mills	Earle Williams, Grace Darmond, Irene Rich	Drama	Vitagraph
The Girl in the Dark	Stuart Paton	Carmel Myers, Ashton Dearholt, Frank Tokunaga	Mystery	Universal
The Girl of My Dreams	Louis Chaudet	Billie Rhodes, Lamar Johnstone	Romance	Robertson-Cole
The Girl of Today	John S. Robertson	Corinne Griffith, Marc McDermott	War	Vitagraph
The Girl Who Came Back	Robert G. Vignola	Ethel Clayton, Elliott Dexter, Theodore Roberts	Drama	Paramount
The Girl Who Wouldn't Quit	Edgar Jones	Louise Lovely, Gertrude Astor, Philo McCullough	Drama	Universal
The Girl with the Champagne Eyes	Chester M. Franklin	Jewel Carmen, Lee Shumway	Drama	Fox
Go West, Young Man	Harry Beaumont	Tom Moore, Ora Carew, Jack Richardson	Western	Goldwyn
The Goat	Donald Crisp	Fred Stone, Fanny Midgley, Rhea Mitchell	Comedy	Paramount
The Goddess of Lost Lake	Wallace Worsley	Louise Glaum, Lawson Butt, Hayward Mack	Drama	Hodkinson
The Golden Fleece	Gilbert P. Hamilton	Joseph Bennett, Peggy Pearce, Jack Curtis	Comedy	Triangle
The Golden Goal	Paul Scardon	Harry T. Morey, Florence Deshon, Jean Paige	Drama	Vitagraph
The Golden Wall	Dell Henderson	Carlyle Blackwell, Evelyn Greeley, Johnny Hines	Comedy drama	World
Good-Bye, Bill	John Emerson	Shirley Mason, Ernest Truex	Comedy	Paramount
A Good Loser	Dick Donaldson	Lee Hill, Arthur Millett, Peggy Pearce	Western	Triangle
Good Night, Paul	Walter Edwards	Harrison Ford, Constance Talmadge, Norman Kerry	Comedy	Selznick
The Grain of Dust	Harry Revier	Lillian Walker, Ramsey Wallace, Edith Day	Drama	Independent
The Grand Passion	Ida May Park	Dorothy Phillips, Jack Mulhall, Lon Chaney	Western	Universal
The Great Adventure	Alice Guy-Blaché	Bessie Love, Wyndham Standing	Drama	Goldwyn
The Great Love	D. W. Griffith	George Fawcett, Lillian Gish	War drama	Paramount
The Greatest Thing in Life	D. W. Griffith	Robert Harron, Lillian Gish	War drama	Paramount
Green Eyes	Roy William Neill	Dorothy Dalton, Jack Holt, Doris May	Drama	Paramount
The Green God	Paul Scardon	Harry T. Morey, Betty Blythe, Arthur Donaldson	Mystery	Vitagraph
The Grey Parasol	Lawrence C. Windom	Claire Anderson, Ed Brady	Drama	Triangle
The Grouch	Oscar Apfel	Montagu Love, John Davidson	Drama	World
The Guilt of Silence	Elmer Clifton	Monroe Salisbury, Ruth Clifford	Crime	Universal
The Guilty Man	Irvin Willat	William Garwood, Vivian Reed, Gloria Hope	Drama	Paramount
The Gun Woman	Frank Borzage	Texas Guinan, Ed Brady, Francis McDonald	Western	Triangle
The Gypsy Trail	Walter Edwards	Bryant Washburn, Wanda Hawley, Casson Ferguson	Comedy	Paramount
The Hand at the Window	Raymond Wells	Joe King, Margery Wilson, Irene Hunt	Mystery	Triangle
Hands Down	Rupert Julian	Monroe Salisbury, Ruth Clifford	Western	Universal
The Hard Rock Breed	Raymond Wells	Jack Livingston, Margery Wilson	Drama	Triangle
He Comes Up Smiling	Allan Dwan	Douglas Fairbanks, Marjorie Daw	Adventure	Paramount
Headin' South	Allan Dwan	Douglas Fairbanks, Katherine MacDonald, Frank Campeau	Romantic comedy	Paramount
The Heart of a Girl	John G. Adolfi	Barbara Castleton, Irving Cummings	Drama	World
The Heart of Rachael	Howard Hickman	Bessie Barriscale, Herschel Mayall, Ella Hall	Drama	Hodkinson
The Heart of Romance	Harry F. Millarde	June Caprice, George Bunny	Comedy	Fox
The Heart of Humanity	Allen Holubar	Dorothy Phillips, William Stowell, Erich von Stroheim	War	Universal
Heart of the Sunset	Frank Powell	Anna Q. Nilsson, Herbert Heyes	Western	Goldwyn
Heart of the Wilds	Marshall Neilan	Elsie Ferguson, Thomas Meighan, Joseph W. Smiley	Drama	Paramount
Hearts of Love	J. Charles Haydon	Edna Mayo, Gladden James	Drama	Independent
Hearts of the World	D. W. Griffith	Lillian Gish, Dorothy Gish, Robert Harron	War	Paramount
Hearts or Diamonds	Henry King	William Russell, Charlotte Burton	Drama	Mutual
A Heart's Revenge	Oscar Lund	Gretchen Hartman, Eric Mayne	Drama	Fox
Heiress for a Day	John Francis Dillon	Olive Thomas, Joe King	Comedy	Triangle
Hell Bent	John Ford	Harry Carey, Duke R. Lee, Neva Gerber	Western	Universal
The Hell Cat	Reginald Barker	Geraldine Farrar, Tom Santschi, Milton Sills	Western	Goldwyn
Hell's Crater	W.B. Pearson	Grace Cunard, Eileen Sedgwick	Western	Universal
Hell's End	James McLaughlin	William Desmond, Josie Sedgwick	Drama	Triangle
Her American Husband	E. Mason Hopper	Teddy Sampson, Darrell Foss, Leota Lorraine	Drama	Triangle
Her Body in Bond	Robert Z. Leonard	Mae Murray, Kenneth Harlan, Joseph W. Girard	Drama	Universal
Her Boy	George Irving	Effie Shannon, Niles Welch	Drama	Metro
Her Country First	James Young	Vivian Martin, John Cossar, Florence Oberle	Comedy	Paramount
Her Decision	Jack Conway	Gloria Swanson, Ann Forrest	Drama	Triangle
Her Final Reckoning	Émile Chautard	Pauline Frederick, Warren Cook, Karl Dane	Drama	Paramount
Her Great Chance	Charles Maigne	Alice Brady, David Powell	Drama	Selznick
Her Inspiration	Robert Thornby	May Allison, Herbert Heyes	Drama	Metro
Her Man	John Ince, Ralph Ince	Elaine Hammerstein, Lawson Butt, Erville Alderson	Drama	Pathe Exchange
Her Mistake	Julius Steger	Evelyn Nesbit, Lois Meredith	Drama	Independent
Her Moment	Frank Beal	Anna Luther, William Garwood, Anne Schaefer	Drama	Independent
Her One Mistake	Edward LeSaint	Gladys Brockwell, William Scott	Drama	Fox
Her Only Way	Sidney Franklin	Norma Talmadge, Eugene O'Brien	Drama	Selznick
Her Price	Edmund Lawrence	Virginia Pearson, Paul Stanton	Drama	Fox
Heredity	William P.S. Earle	Madge Evans, Barbara Castleton, George MacQuarrie	Drama	World
Hidden Fires	George Irving	Mae Marsh, Rod La Rocque, Alec B. Francis	Comedy	Goldwyn
The Hidden Pearls	George Melford	Sessue Hayakawa, Florence Vidor, Margaret Loomis	Drama	Paramount
High Stakes	Arthur Hoyt	J. Barney Sherry, Harvey Clark	Mystery	Triangle
High Tide	Gilbert P. Hamilton	Harry Mestayer, Marie Pavis	Drama	Triangle
The Hillcrest Mystery	George Fitzmaurice	Irene Castle, Wyndham Standing, DeWitt Jennings	Mystery	Pathe Exchange
The Hired Man	Victor Schertzinger	Charles Ray, Charles K. French, Doris May	Comedy	Paramount
His Birthright	William Worthington	Sessue Hayakawa, Marin Sais, Tsuru Aoki	Drama	Mutual
His Bonded Wife	Charles Brabin	Emmy Wehlen, Creighton Hale	Comedy drama	Metro
His Daughter Pays	Paolo Trinchera	Gertrude McCoy, Pauline Curley	Drama	Independent
His Enemy, the Law	Raymond Wells	Jack Richardson, Irene Hunt	Drama	Triangle
His Majesty, Bunker Bean	William Desmond Taylor	Jack Pickford, Louise Huff	Comedy	Paramount
His Own Home Town	Victor Schertzinger	Charles Ray Katherine MacDonald, Charles K. French	Drama	Paramount
His Robe of Honor	Rex Ingram	Henry B. Walthall, Mary Charleson, Noah Beery	Drama	Independent
His Royal Highness	Carlyle Blackwell	Carlyle Blackwell, Evelyn Greeley, Kate Lester	Adventure	World
Hit-The-Trail Holliday	Marshall Neilan	George M. Cohan, Marguerite Clayton, Richard Barthelmess	Comedy	Paramount
Hitting the High Spots	Charles Swickard	Bert Lytell, Eileen Percy, Winter Hall	Comedy	Metro
Hitting the Trail	Dell Henderson	Carlyle Blackwell, Evelyn Greeley, Muriel Ostriche	Drama	World
Hoarded Assets	Paul Scardon	Harry T. Morey, Betty Blythe	Drama	Vitagraph
Hobbs in a Hurry	Henry King	William Russell, Henry A. Barrows, Winifred Westover	Western	Pathé Exchange
The Home Trail	William Wolbert	Nell Shipman, Gayne Whitman	Western	Vitagraph
The Honor of His House	William C. deMille	Sessue Hayakawa, Florence Vidor, Jack Holt	Drama	Paramount
Honor's Cross	Wallace Worsley	Rhea Mitchell, Herschel Mayall, Edward Coxen	Drama	Goldwyn
A Hoosier Romance	Colin Campbell	Colleen Moore, Edward Jobson, Thomas Jefferson	Comedy	Selig
The Hope Chest	Elmer Clifton	Dorothy Gish, George Fawcett, Richard Barthelmess	Comedy drama	Paramount
The Hopper	Thomas N. Heffron	Walt Whitman, Irene Hunt, Gino Corrado	Comedy	Triangle
The House of Glass	Emile Chautard	Clara Kimball Young, Pell Trenton	Drama	Selznick
The House of Gold	Edwin Carewe	Emmy Wehlen, Joseph Kilgour	Drama	Metro
The House of Mirth	Albert Capellani	Katherine Harris Barrymore, Henry Kolker, Christine Mayo	Drama	Metro
The House of Silence	Donald Crisp	Wallace Reid, Ann Little, Adele Farrington	Drama	Paramount
How Could You, Caroline?	Frederick A. Thomson	Bessie Love, James W. Morrison	Comedy	Pathe Exchange
How Could You, Jean?	William Desmond Taylor	Mary Pickford, Casson Ferguson, Herbert Standing	Comedy	Paramount
Huck and Tom	William Desmond Taylor	Jack Pickford, Robert Gordon	Comedy drama	Paramount
Hugon, The Mighty	Rollin S. Sturgeon	Monroe Salisbury, Antrim Short	Drama	Universal
Humdrum Brown	Rex Ingram	Henry B. Walthall, Mary Charleson	Comedy drama	Independent
Humility	Jack Pratt	Betty Brice, Murdock MacQuarrie	Drama	Independent
The Hun Within	Chester Withey	Dorothy Gish, George Fawcett, Charles K. Gerrard	War drama	Paramount
Hungry Eyes	Rupert Julian	Monroe Salisbury, Ruth Clifford, Gretchen Lederer	Western	Universal

== I–J ==
Title	Director	Cast	Genre	Notes
I Love You	Walter Edwards	Alma Rubens, Francis McDonald, Wheeler Oakman	Drama	Triangle
I Want to Forget	James Kirkwood	Evelyn Nesbit, Alphonse Ethier	Drama	Fox
I'll Say So	Raoul Walsh	George Walsh, William Bailey	Comedy	Fox
Impossible Susan	Lloyd Ingraham	Margarita Fischer, Jack Mower, Lloyd Hughes	Comedy	Mutual
The Impostor	Dell Henderson	Anna Murdock, David Powell, George Abbott	Comedy	Mutual
In Bad	Edward Sloman	William Russell, Francelia Billington	Comedy drama	Mutual
In Judgement Of	Will S. Davis	Anna Q. Nilsson, Franklyn Farnum, Herbert Standing	Drama	Metro
In Pursuit of Polly	Chester Withey	Billie Burke, Thomas Meighan, Frank Losee	Comedy	Paramount
In the Hollow of Her Hand	Charles Maigne	Alice Brady, Percy Marmont, Myrtle Stedman	Mystery	Selznick
The Inn of the Blue Moon	John B. O'Brien	Doris Kenyon, Crauford Kent	Drama	Independent
Innocent	George Fitzmaurice	Fannie Ward, Armand Kaliz	Drama	Pathe Exchange
Innocent's Progress	Frank Borzage	Pauline Starke, Jack Livingston	Drama	Triangle
Inside the Lines	David Hartford	Lewis Stone, Marguerite Clayton, George Field	Thriller	World
The Interloper	Oscar Apfel	Kitty Gordon, Irving Cummings, Warren Cook	Drama	World
Irish Eyes	William C. Dowlan	Pauline Starke, Joe King	Drama	Triangle
Jack Spurlock, Prodigal	Carl Harbaugh	George Walsh, Dan Mason, Ruth Taylor	Comedy	Fox
A Japanese Nightingale	George Fitzmaurice	Fannie Ward, W.E. Lawrence, Yukio Aoyama	Drama	Pathe Exchange
Jilted Janet	Lloyd Ingraham	Margarita Fischer, Jack Mower	Comedy	Mutual
Joan of Plattsburg	George Loane Tucker	Mabel Normand, Joseph W. Smiley, Edward Elkas	Comedy	Goldwyn
Joan of the Woods	Travers Vale	June Elvidge, John Bowers, George MacQuarrie	Drama	World
Johanna Enlists	William Desmond Taylor	Mary Pickford, Anne Schaefer, Fred Huntley	Comedy	Paramount
Journey's End	Travers Vale	Ethel Clayton, John Bowers, Muriel Ostriche	Comedy	World
Jules of the Strong Heart	Donald Crisp	George Beban, Helen Jerome Eddy, Raymond Hatton	Drama	Paramount
Just a Woman	Julius Steger	Charlotte Walker, Florence Deshon	Drama	Independent
Just for Tonight	Charles Giblyn	Tom Moore, Lucy Fox	Comedy drama	Goldwyn
Just Sylvia	Travers Vale	Barbara Castleton, Jack Drumier, Johnny Hines	Comedy	World

== K–L ==
Title	Director	Cast	Genre	Notes
The Kaiser, the Beast of Berlin	Rupert Julian	Elmo Lincoln, Nigel De Brulier, Lon Chaney	War	Universal
Kaiser's Finish	John Joseph Harvey	Earl Schenck, Claire Whitney, Percy Standing	War drama	Warners
The Kaiser's Shadow	Roy William Neill	Dorothy Dalton, Thurston Hall, Leota Lorraine	Drama	Paramount
Keith of the Border	Clifford Smith	Roy Stewart, Josie Sedgwick	Western	Triangle
The Keys of the Righteous	Jerome Storm	Enid Bennett, Earle Rodney, George Nichols	Drama	Paramount
The Kid Is Clever	Paul Powell	George Walsh, Doris Pawn	Comedy	Fox
Kidder and Ko	Richard Foster Baker	Bryant Washburn, Harry Dunkinson	Comedy	Pathe Exchange
Kildare of Storm	Harry L. Franklin	Emily Stevens, King Baggot, Crauford Kent	Drama	Metro
The King of Diamonds	Paul Scardon	Harry T. Morey, Betty Blythe	Drama	Vitagraph
The Kingdom of Youth	Clarence G. Badger	Madge Kennedy, Tom Moore	Romance	Goldwyn
Kiss or Kill	Elmer Clifton	Herbert Rawlinson, Priscilla Dean	Crime	Universal
The Knife	Robert G. Vignola	Alice Brady, Frank Morgan, Crauford Kent	Drama	Selznick
Kultur	Edward LeSaint	Gladys Brockwell, William Scott	War	Fox
The Lady of the Dug-Out	W. S. Van Dyke	Al Jennings, Frank Jennings	Western	Independent
A Lady's Name	Walter Edwards	Constance Talmadge, Harrison Ford, Emory Johnson	Comedy drama	Selznick
Lafayette, We Come	Léonce Perret	Dolores Cassinelli, E.K. Lincoln, Ernest Maupain	War	Independent
The Landloper	George Irving	Harold Lockwood, Pauline Curley, Stanton Heck	Romance	Metro
The Last Rebel	Gilbert P. Hamilton	Belle Bennett, Walt Whitman, Lillian Langdon	Drama	Triangle
Laughing Bill Hyde	Hobart Henley	Will Rogers, Anna Lehr, Mabel Ballin	Adventure	Goldwyn
The Law of the Great Northwest	Raymond Wells	Gino Corrado, William V. Mong, Margery Wilson	Drama	Triangle
The Law of the North	Irvin Willat	Charles Ray, Doris May, Robert McKim	Drama	Paramount
The Law's Outlaw	Clifford Smith	Roy Stewart, Fritzi Ridgeway	Western	Triangle
The Law That Divides	Howard M. Mitchell	Kathleen Clifford, Kenneth Harlan, Gordon Sackville	Drama	Hodkinson
A Law Unto Herself	Wallace Worsley	Louise Glaum, Sam De Grasse, Irene Rich	Drama	Hodkinson
Lawless Love	Robert Thornby	Jewel Carmen, Edward Hearn	Western	Fox
Leap to Fame	Carlyle Blackwell	Carlyle Blackwell, Evelyn Greeley, Muriel Ostriche	Adventure	World
The Legion of Death	Tod Browning	Edith Storey, Philo McCullough	Drama	Metro
Lend Me Your Name	Fred J. Balshofer	Harold Lockwood, Pauline Curley, Bessie Eyton	Romantic comedy	Metro
Less Than Kin	Donald Crisp	Wallace Reid, Ann Little, Raymond Hatton	Comedy	Paramount
Lest We Forget	Léonce Perret	Rita Jolivet, Hamilton Revelle, L. Rogers Lytton	War drama	Metro
Let's Get a Divorce	Charles Giblyn	Billie Burke, Pinna Nesbit, Rod La Rocque	Comedy	Paramount
The Liar	Edmund Lawrence	Virginia Pearson, Edward Roseman	Drama	Fox
The Lie	J. Searle Dawley	Elsie Ferguson, David Powell (actor), Percy Marmont	Drama	Paramount
Life's Greatest Problem	J. Stuart Blackton	Mitchell Lewis, Rubye De Remer, Helen Ferguson	War	Independent
The Life Mask	Frank Hall Crane	Olga Petrova, Thomas Holding, Wyndham Standing	Mystery	First National
Life or Honor?	Edmund Lawrence	Leah Baird, James Morrison, Mathilde Brundage	Mystery	Independent
The Light of the Western Stars	Charles Swickard	Dustin Farnum, Winifred Kingston	Western	Independent
The Light Within	Laurence Trimble	Olga Petrova, Lumsden Hare, Thomas Holding	Drama	First National
Limousine Life	John Francis Dillon	Olive Thomas, Lee Phelps, Lillian West	Comedy	Triangle
Little Miss Hoover	John S. Robertson	Marguerite Clark, Eugene O'Brien, Alfred Hickman	Romance	Paramount
Little Miss No-Account	William P.S. Earle	Gladys Leslie, Eulalie Jensen	Comedy	Vitagraph
Little Orphant Annie	Colin Campbell	Colleen Moore, Tom Santschi, Harry Lonsdale	Drama	Selig
Little Red Decides	Jack Conway	Frederick Vroom, Jean Hersholt	Drama	Triangle
The Little Runaway	William P.S. Earle	Gladys Leslie, Edward Earle, Betty Blythe	Comedy	Vitagraph
A Little Sister of Everybody	Robert Thornby	Bessie Love, George Fisher	Comedy	Pathe Exchange
Little Women	Harley Knoles	Isabel Lamon, Dorothy Bernard, Conrad Nagel	Drama	Paramount
Loaded Dice	Herbert Blaché	Frank Keenan, Florence Billings	Drama	Pathe Exchange
The Locked Heart	Henry King	Gloria Joy, Vola Vale, Henry King	Drama	Independent
The Lonely Woman	Thomas N. Heffron	Belle Bennett, Alberta Lee	Drama	Triangle
The Love Brokers	E. Mason Hopper	Alma Rubens, Texas Guinan	Drama	Triangle
Love Me	Roy William Neill	Dorothy Dalton, Jack Holt, William Conklin	Drama	Paramount
The Love Net	Tefft Johnson	Madge Evans, Kate Lester	Comedy	World
The Love Swindle	John Francis Dillon	Edith Roberts, Leo White, Clarissa Selwynne	Comedy	Universal
Love Watches	Henry Houry	Corinne Griffith, Florence Deshon	Comedy	Vitagraph
Love's Conquest	Edward José	Lina Cavalieri, Courtenay Foote	Drama	Paramount
Love's Law	Francis J. Grandon	Gail Kane, Courtenay Foote	Drama	Mutual
Love's Pay Day	E. Mason Hopper	Rosemary Theby, Pete Morrison	Drama	Triangle
The Lure of the Circus	J.P. McGowan	Eddie Polo, Eileen Sedgwick, Molly Malone	Adventure	Universal
The Lure of Luxury	Elsie Jane Wilson	Ruth Clifford, Edward Hearn	Drama	Universal

== M–N ==
Title	Director	Cast	Genre	Notes
Madam Who?	Reginald Barker	Bessie Barriscale, Edward Coxen	Drama	Independent
Madame Jealousy	Robert G. Vignola	Pauline Frederick, Thomas Meighan	Drama	Paramount
Madame Sphinx	Thomas N. Heffron	Alma Rubens, Wallace MacDonald	Mystery	Triangle
Madame Spy	Douglas Gerrard	Jack Mulhall, Jean Hersholt, Claire Du Brey	Comedy	Universal
The Magic Eye	Rae Berger	Claire Du Brey, Zoe Rae	Drama	Universal
Maid o' the Storm	Raymond B. West	Bessie Barriscale, Herschel Mayall	Drama	Independent
The Make-Believe Wife	John S. Robertson	Billie Burke, Alfred Hickman, David Powell	Comedy	Paramount
The Man Above the Law	Raymond Wells	Jack Richardson, Josie Sedgwick, Claire McDowell	Western	Triangle
The Man from Funeral Range	Walter Edwards	Wallace Reid, Ann Little, Lottie Pickford	Western	Paramount
The Man Hunt	Travers Vale	Ethel Clayton, Rockliffe Fellowes	Comedy	World
The Man of Bronze	David Hartford	Lewis Stone, Marguerite Clayton	Drama	World
The Man Who Woke Up	James McLaughlin	William V. Mong, Pauline Starke	Drama	Triangle
The Man Who Wouldn't Tell	James Young	Earle Williams, Grace Darmond	Drama	Vitagraph
A Man's World	Herbert Blaché	Emily Stevens, Florence Short	Drama	Metro
The Mantle of Charity	Edward Sloman	Margarita Fischer, Jack Mower	Comedy	Pathe Exchange
The Marriage Lie	Stuart Paton	Carmel Myers, Kenneth Harlan, Harry Carter	Drama	Universal
The Marriage Ring	Fred Niblo	Enid Bennett, Jack Holt	Drama	Paramount
The Marionettes	Emile Chautard	Clara Kimball Young, Nigel Barrie, Alec B. Francis	Comedy	Selznick
Marked Cards	Henri D'Elba	Margery Wilson, Wallace MacDonald	Drama	Triangle
Marriage	James Kirkwood Sr.	Catherine Calvert, David Powell, Thomas Holding	Drama	Independent
Marriages Are Made	Carl Harbaugh	Peggy Hyland, Dan Mason	Comedy	Fox Film
The Married Virgin	Joseph Maxwell	Vera Sisson, Rudolph Valentino, Kathleen Kirkham	Drama	Independent
The Mask	Thomas N. Heffron	Claire Anderson, John Gilbert, Edward Hearn	Comedy	Triangle
The Mating	Frederick A. Thomson	Gladys Leslie, Herbert Rawlinson	Comedy	Vitagraph
The Mating of Marcella	Roy William Neill	Dorothy Dalton, Thurston Hall, Juanita Hansen	Drama	Paramount
Men	Perry N. Vekroff	Anna Lehr, Charlotte Walker	Drama	Independent
Men Who Have Made Love to Me	Arthur Berthelet	Mary MacLane, Ralph Graves	Biopic	Essanay
The Menace	John S. Robertson	Corinne Griffith, Evart Overton	Drama	Vitagraph
Merely Players	Oscar Apfel	Kitty Gordon, Irving Cummings, George MacQuarrie	Drama	World
Mickey	F. Richard Jones, James Young	Mabel Normand, George Nichols, Lew Cody	Comedy	FBO
Midnight Madness	Rupert Julian	Ruth Clifford, Kenneth Harlan, Claire Du Brey	Mystery	Universal
The Midnight Patrol	Irvin Willat	Thurston Hall, Rosemary Theby, Charles K. French	Drama	Selznick
The Midnight Trail	Edward Sloman	William Russell, Francelia Billington, Carl Stockdale	Mystery	Mutual
Milady o' the Beanstalk	William Bertram	Marie Osborne, Ernest Morrison	Comedy	Pathe Exchange
Mile-a-Minute Kendall	William Desmond Taylor	Jack Pickford, Louise Huff, Jane Wolfe	Drama	Paramount
The Million Dollar Dollies	Léonce Perret	Dolly Sisters, Huntley Gordon, Dolores Cassinelli	Comedy	Metro
Mirandy Smiles	William C. deMille	Vivian Martin, Douglas MacLean, Mayme Kelso	Drama	Paramount
Miss Ambition	Henry Houry	Corinne Griffith, Walter McGrail, Betty Blythe	Drama	Vitagraph
Miss Innocence	Harry Millarde	June Caprice, Marie Shotwell	Drama	Fox
Missing	James Young	Thomas Meighan, Sylvia Breamer, Robert Gordon	Drama	Paramount
M'Liss	Charles Miller	Mary Pickford, Theodore Roberts, Thomas Meighan	Comedy	Paramount
The Model's Confession	Ida May Park	Mary MacLaren, Kenneth Harlan, Gretchen Lederer	Drama	Universal
Modern Love	Robert Z. Leonard	Mae Murray, Philo McCullough, Claire Du Brey	Drama	Universal
Molly Go Get 'Em	Lloyd Ingraham	Margarita Fischer, Jack Mower	Comedy	Mutual
Money Isn't Everything	Edward Sloman	Margarita Fischer, Jack Mower	Comedy	Pathe Exchange
Money Mad	Hobart Henley	Mae Marsh, Rod La Rocque, Corinne Barker	Mystery	Goldwyn
The Moral Law	Bertram Bracken	Gladys Brockwell, Rosita Marstini	Drama	Fox
Moral Suicide	Ivan Abramson	John Mason, Anna Luther, Alan Hale	Drama	Pathe Exchange
More Trouble	Ernest C. Warde	Frank Keenan, John Gilbert, Helen Dunbar	Comedy	Pathe Exchange
Morgan's Raiders	Wilfred Lucas, Bess Meredyth	Violet Mersereau, Edmund Burns	Drama	Universal
The Mortgaged Wife	Allen Holubar	Dorothy Phillips, Alan Roscoe	Drama	Universal
A Mother's Secret	Douglas Gerrard	Ella Hall, Emory Johnson	Drama	Universal
A Mother's Sin	Thomas R. Mills	Earle Williams, Ernest Maupain	Drama	Vitagraph
Mr. Fix-It	Allan Dwan	Douglas Fairbanks, Wanda Hawley, Marjorie Daw	Romantic comedy	Paramount
Mr. Logan, U.S.A.	Lynn F. Reynolds	Tom Mix, Kathleen O'Connor	Western	Fox Film
Mrs. Dane's Defense	Hugh Ford	Pauline Frederick, Frank Losee, Leslie Austin	Drama	Paramount
Mrs. Leffingwell's Boots	Walter Edwards	Constance Talmadge, Harrison Ford, George Fisher	Comedy	Selznick
Mrs. Slacker	Hobart Henley	Gladys Hulette, Creighton Hale	War comedy	Pathe Exchange
My Cousin	Edward José	Enrico Caruso, Carolina White	Drama	Paramount
My Four Years in Germany	William Nigh	Louis Dean, Earl Schenck	Drama	Warners
My Own United States	John W. Noble	Arnold Daly, Charles E. Graham	Drama	Metro
My Unmarried Wife	George Siegmann	Carmel Myers, Kenneth Harlan	Drama	Universal
My Wife	Dell Henderson	Ann Murdock, Rex McDougall, Ferdinand Gottschalk	Comedy	Mutual
The Mysterious Client	Fred E. Wright	Irene Castle, Milton Sills, Warner Oland	Comedy	Pathe Exchange
The Mysterious Mr. Browning	Sidney M. Goldin	Walter Miller, Paul Panzer, Edna Maison	Mystery	Independent
The Mystery Girl	William C. deMille	Ethel Clayton, Clarence Burton	Drama	Paramount
Mystic Faces	E. Mason Hopper	Yutaka Abe, Larry Steers, Clara Morris	Comedy drama	Triangle
The Naulahka	George Fitzmaurice	Antonio Moreno, Helene Chadwick, Warner Oland	adventure	Pathe Exchange
Nancy Comes Home	John Francis Dillon	Myrtle Lind, John Gilbert, George Pearce	Comedy	Triangle
The Narrow Path	George Fitzmaurice	Fannie Ward, W. E. Lawrence	Drama	Pathé Exchange
The Nature Girl	Oscar Lund	Violet Mersereau, Donald Stuart	Drama	Universal
Naughty, Naughty!	Jerome Storm	Enid Bennett, Earle Rodney, Marjorie Bennett	Comedy	Paramount
Neighbors	Frank Hall Crane	Madge Evans, Johnny Hines	Comedy	World
New Love for Old	Elsie Jane Wilson	Ella Hall, Winter Hall, Gretchen Lederer	Drama	Universal
A Nine O'Clock Town	Victor Schertzinger	Charles Ray, Jane Novak, Otto Hoffman	Comedy	Paramount
Nine-Tenths of the Law	B. Reeves Eason	Mitchell Lewis, B. Reeves Eason Jr.	Drama	Independent
No Man's Land	Will S. Davis	Bert Lytell, Anna Q. Nilsson, Charles Arling	Drama	Metro
Nobody's Wife	Edward LeSaint	Jack Hoxie, Louise Lovely	Romance	Universal
A Nymph of the Foothills	Frederick A. Thomson	Gladys Leslie, Walter Hiers	Drama	Vitagraph

== O–P ==
Title	Director	Cast	Genre	Notes
Oh, Johnny!	Ira M. Lowry	Louis Bennison, Alphonse Ethier	Western	Goldwyn
Old Hartwell's Cub	Thomas N. Heffron	William Desmond, Mary Warren	Drama	Triangle
Old Love for New	Raymond Wells	Margery Wilson, Irene Hunt	Drama	Triangle
Old Wives for New	Cecil B. DeMille	Elliott Dexter, Florence Vidor, Wanda Hawley	Drama	Paramount
The Oldest Law	Harley Knoles	June Elvidge, John Bowers	Drama	World
On the Jump	Raoul Walsh	George Walsh, James A. Marcus	Comedy	Fox
On the Quiet	Chester Withey	John Barrymore, Lois Meredith, Frank Losee	Comedy	Paramount
Once to Every Man	T. Hayes Hunter	Mable Withee, Roy Applegate	Drama	Independent
One Dollar Bid	Ernest C. Warde	J. Warren Kerrigan, Lois Wilson, Leatrice Joy	Drama	Hodkinson
One More American	William C. deMille	George Beban, Marcia Manon, Jack Holt	Drama	Paramount
One Thousand Dollars	Kenneth S. Webb	Edward Earle, Agnes Ayres, Florence Deshon	Comedy	Vitagraph
The One Woman	Reginald Barker	Lawson Butt, Clara Williams	Drama	Selznick
The Only Road	Frank Reicher	Viola Dana, Casson Ferguson	Western	Metro
Opportunity	John H. Collins	Viola Dana, Hale Hamilton	Comedy	Metro
The Ordeal of Rosetta	Émile Chautard	Alice Brady, Crauford Kent	Drama	Selznick
Other Men's Daughters	Carl Harbaugh	Peggy Hyland, Eric Mayne	Drama	Fox
The Other Man	Paul Scardon	Harry T. Morey, Grace Darmond, Florence Deshon	Drama	Vitagraph
The Other Woman	Albert Parker	Peggy Hyland, Milton Sills	Drama	Pathe Exchange
Our Little Wife	Edward Dillon	Madge Kennedy, Walter Hiers, Marguerite Marsh	Comedy drama	Goldwyn
Our Mrs. McChesney	Ralph Ince	Ethel Barrymore, Huntley Gordon, Wilfred Lytell	Comedy	Metro
Out of a Clear Sky	Marshall Neilan	Marguerite Clark, Thomas Meighan, Raymond Bloomer	Romance	Paramount
Out of the Night	James Kirkwood	Catherine Calvert, Herbert Rawlinson	Drama	Independent
Over the Top	Wilfrid North	Arthur Guy Empey, Lois Meredith, James W. Morrison	War	Vitagraph
The Painted Lily	Thomas N. Heffron	Alma Rubens, William V. Mong	Drama	Triangle
Painted Lips	Edward LeSaint	Louise Lovely, Lew Cody	Drama	Universal
A Pair of Cupids	Charles Brabin	Francis X. Bushman, Beverly Bayne	Comedy	Metro
A Pair of Silk Stockings	Walter Edwards	Constance Talmadge, Harrison Ford, Wanda Hawley	Comedy	Selznick
A Pair of Sixes	Lawrence C. Windom	Taylor Holmes, Robert Conness, Maude Eburne	Comedy	Essanay
Pals First	Edwin Carewe	Harold Lockwood, Rubye De Remer	Romance	Metro
The Panther Woman	Ralph Ince	Olga Petrova, Rockliffe Fellowes	Drama	First National
Patriotism	Raymond B. West	Bessie Barriscale, Herschel Mayall	Drama	Hodkinson
Pay Day	Sidney Drew	Sidney Drew, Lucile McVey, Florence Short	Comedy	Metro
Paying His Debt	Clifford Smith	Roy Stewart, Josie Sedgwick	Western	Triangle
Peck's Bad Girl	Charles Giblyn	Mabel Normand, Earle Foxe, Corinne Barker	Comedy	Paramount
Peg of the Pirates	Oscar Lund	Peggy Hyland, Louis Wolheim, Eric Mayne	Historical	Fox
A Perfect 36	Charles Giblyn	Mabel Normand, Rod La Rocque, Flora Zabelle	Comedy	Goldwyn
A Perfect Lady	Clarence G. Badger	Madge Kennedy, Rod La Rocque, May McAvoy	Comedy	Goldwyn
A Petticoat Pilot	Rollin S. Sturgeon	Vivian Martin, Theodore Roberts, Harrison Ford	Comedy	Paramount
Petticoats and Politics	Howard M. Mitchell	Anita King, Gordon Sackville	Comedy	Independent
The Phantom Riders	John Ford	Harry Carey, William Steele, Molly Malone	Western	Universal
Playing the Game	Victor Schertzinger	Charles Ray, Doris May, Robert McKim	Comedy	Paramount
Playthings	Douglas Gerrard	Fritzi Brunette, Charles K. Gerrard, Lew Cody	Drama	Universal
The Poor Rich Man	Charles Brabin	Francis X. Bushman, Beverly Bayne, Stuart Holmes	Comedy	Metro
The Power and the Glory	Lawrence C. Windom	June Elvidge, Frank Mayo, Madge Evans	Drama	World
Powers That Prey	Henry King	Mary Miles Minter, Allan Forrest	Comedy drama	Mutual
The Pretender	Clifford Smith	William Desmond, Joseph Franz	Comedy western	Triangle
The Price of Applause	Thomas N. Heffron	Jack Livingston, Claire Anderson	Drama	Triangle
The Primitive Woman	Lloyd Ingraham	Margarita Fischer, Jack Mower	Comedy	Mutual
Prisoners of the Pines	Ernest C. Warde	J. Warren Kerrigan, Lois Wilson, Claire Du Brey	Drama	Hodkinson
Private Peat	Edward José	Harold R. Peat, Miriam Fouche, William Sorelle	War	Paramount
The Prodigal Wife	Frank Reicher	Mary Boland, Lucy Cotton	Drama	Independent
Prunella	Maurice Tourneur	Marguerite Clark, Nora Cecil, Marcia Harris	Romance	Paramount
The Prussian Cur	Raoul Walsh	Miriam Cooper, Ralph Faulkner	War	Fox
The Purple Dress	Martin Justice	Evart Overton, Adele DeGarde	Drama	Broadway Star
The Purple Lily	Fred Kelsey	Kitty Gordon, Frank Mayo, Muriel Ostriche	Drama	World

== Q–R ==
Title	Director	Cast	Genre	Notes
The Queen of Hearts	Edmund Lawrence	Virginia Pearson, Joseph W. Smiley	Mystery	Fox Film
Queen of the Sea	John G. Adolfi	Annette Kellermann, Walter Law, Louis Dean	Adventure	Fox
Quicksand	Victor Schertzinger	Henry A. Barrows, Edward Coxen, Dorothy Dalton	Drama	Paramount
The Racing Strain	Emmett J. Flynn	Mae Marsh, Clifford Bruce	Drama	Goldwyn
The Rainbow Trail	Frank Lloyd	William Farnum, Ann Forrest, Mary Mersch	Western	Fox
Real Folks	Walter Edwards	Francis McDonald, Fritzi Ridgeway	Comedy	Triangle
The Reason Why	Robert G. Vignola	Clara Kimball Young, Milton Sills	Drama	Selznick
The Red-Haired Cupid	Clifford Smith	Roy Stewart, Peggy Pearce	Comedy	Triangle
The Red, Red Heart	Wilfred Lucas	Monroe Salisbury, Ruth Clifford	Western	Universal
The Return of Mary	Wilfred Lucas	May Allison, Clarence Burton, Claire McDowell	Drama	Metro
The Reckoning Day	Roy Clements	Belle Bennett, Jack Richardson, J. Barney Sherry	Drama	Triangle
Restitution	Howard Gaye	Gino Corrado, John Steppling	Drama	Independent
Resurrection	Edward José	Pauline Frederick, Robert Elliott, Jere Austin	Drama	Paramount
Revelation	George D. Baker	Alla Nazimova, Charles Bryant, Frank Currier	Drama	Metro
Revenge	Tod Browning	Edith Storey, Wheeler Oakman	Western	Metro
A Rich Man's Darling	Edgar Jones	Louise Lovely, Philo McCullough	Comedy	Universal
Rich Man, Poor Man	J. Searle Dawley	Marguerite Clark, Richard Barthelmess	Romance	Paramount
The Richest Girl	Albert Capellani	Anna Murdock, David Powell	Comedy drama	Mutual
Riddle Gawne	William S. Hart, Lambert Hillyer	William S. Hart, Katherine MacDonald, Lon Chaney	Western	Paramount
Riders of the Night	John H. Collins	Viola Dana, Clifford Bruce	Drama	Metro
Riders of the Purple Sage	Frank Lloyd	William Farnum, Mary Mersch, Murdock MacQuarrie	Western	Fox
Rimrock Jones	Donald Crisp	Wallace Reid, Ann Little	Western	Paramount
The Risky Road	Ida May Park	Dorothy Phillips, Juanita Hansen	Drama	Universal
The Road Through the Dark	Edmund Mortimer	Clara Kimball Young, Jack Holt, Elinor Fair	War	Selznick
The Road to France	Dell Henderson	Carlyle Blackwell, Evelyn Greeley, Jack Drumier	War	World
The Romance of Tarzan	Wilfred Lucas	Elmo Lincoln, Enid Markey	Adventure	First National
A Romance of the Air	Harry Revier	Edith Day, Florence Billings, Stuart Holmes, Herbert Standing	War	Independent
A Romance of the Underworld	James Kirkwood	Catherine Calvert, David Powell	Drama	Independent
Rose of the World	Maurice Tourneur	Elsie Ferguson, Wyndham Standing, Percy Marmont	Drama	Paramount
Rose o' Paradise	James Young	Bessie Barriscale, Howard Hickman, Norman Kerry	Drama	Hodkinson
Rosemary Climbs the Heights	Lloyd Ingraham	Mary Miles Minter, Allan Forrest, Margaret Shelby	Drama	Pathé Exchange
Rough and Ready	Richard Stanton	William Farnum, Alphonse Ethier, Mabel Bardine	Western	Fox
The Rough Lover	Joseph De Grasse	Franklyn Farnum, Juanita Hansen	Comedy	Universal
Ruggles of Red Gap	Lawrence C. Windom	Taylor Holmes, Frederick Burton, Lawrence D'Orsay, Virginia Valli	Comedy	Essanay
Ruler of the Road	Ernest C. Warde	Frank Keenan, Frank Sheridan	Drama	Pathe Exchange
Ruling Passions	Abraham S. Schomer	Julia Dean, Edwin Arden, Claire Whitney	Drama	Selznick

== S–T ==
Title	Director	Cast	Genre	Notes
The Safety Curtain	Sidney Franklin	Norma Talmadge, Eugene O'Brien	Drama	Selznick
Salomé	J. Gordon Edwards	Theda Bara, G. Raymond Nye, Alan Roscoe	Drama	Fox
Sandy	George Melford	Jack Pickford, Louise Huff, Edythe Chapman	Drama	Paramount
Sauce for the Goose	Walter Edwards	Constance Talmadge, Harrison Ford, Vera Doria	Comedy	Selznick
The Savage Woman	Edmund Mortimer	Clara Kimball Young, Edward Kimball, Milton Sills	Adventure	Selznick
Say! Young Fellow	Joseph Henabery	Douglas Fairbanks, Marjorie Daw, Frank Campeau	Comedy	Paramount
The Scarlet Drop	John Ford	Harry Carey, Molly Malone	Western	Universal
The Scarlet Road	Edward LeSaint	Gladys Brockwell, Lee Shumway	Drama	Fox Film
The Sea Flower	Colin Campbell	Juanita Hansen, Gayne Whitman	Adventure	Universal
The Sea Panther	Thomas N. Heffron	William Desmond, Mary Warren, Jack Richardson	Adventure	Triangle
The Sea Waif	Frank Reicher	Louise Huff, John Bowers	Drama	World
The Seal of Silence	Thomas R. Mills	Earle Williams, Grace Darmond	Drama	Vitagraph
The Secret Code	Albert Parker	Gloria Swanson, J. Barney Sherry	Drama	Triangle
Secret Strings	John Ince	Olive Tell, Hugh Thompson	Crime	Metro
Selfish Yates	William S. Hart	William S. Hart, Jane Novak, Bert Sprotte	Western	Paramount
The Service Star	Charles Miller	Madge Kennedy, Mabel Ballin, Victory Bateman	Drama	Goldwyn
Set Free	Tod Browning	Edith Roberts, Harold Goodwin	Drama	Universal
Shackled	Reginald Barker	Louise Glaum, John Gilbert, Herschel Mayall	Drama	Hodkinson
Shark Monroe	William S. Hart	William S. Hart, Katherine MacDonald, Joseph Singleton	Adventure	Paramount
The She-Devil	J. Gordon Edwards	Theda Bara, Albert Roscoe	Drama	Fox
She Hired a Husband	John Francis Dillon	Priscilla Dean, Pat O'Malley	Comedy	Universal
The Shell Game	George D. Baker	Emmy Wehlen, Henry Kolker, Joseph Kilgour	Drama	Paramount
Shifting Sands	Albert Parker	Gloria Swanson, Joe King, Harvey Clark	Drama	Triangle
The Shoes That Danced	Frank Borzage	Pauline Starke, Wallace MacDonald	Drama	Triangle
Shoulder Arms	Charles Chaplin	Charlie Chaplin, Sydney Chaplin, Edna Purviance	Comedy	First National
The Shuttle	Rollin S. Sturgeon	Constance Talmadge, Alan Roscoe, Edith Johnson	Romance	Selznick
The Sign Invisible	Edgar Lewis	Mitchell Lewis, Edward Roseman, Mabel Julienne Scott	Drama	First National
The Silent Rider	Clifford Smith	Roy Stewart, Lafe McKee	Western	Triangle
The Silent Woman	Herbert Blaché	Edith Storey, Joseph Kilgour	Drama	Metro
The Sins of the Children	John S. Lopez	Mahlon Hamilton, Alma Hanlon, Stuart Holmes	Drama	Independent
Six Shooter Andy	Sidney Franklin, Chester Franklin	Tom Mix, Bert Woodruff	Western	Fox
Smashing Through	Elmer Clifton	Herbert Rawlinson, Sam De Grasse, Sally Starr	Western	Universal
The Soap Girl	Martin Justice	Gladys Leslie, Edmund Burns	Comedy	Vitagraph
Social Ambition	Wallace Worsley	Howard Hickman, Rhea Mitchell, Kathleen Kirkham	Drama	Goldwyn
Social Briars	Henry King	Mary Miles Minter, Allan Forrest	Comedy drama	Mutual
Social Hypocrites	Albert Capellani	May Allison, Marie Wainwright, Joseph Kilgour	Drama	Metro
Society for Sale	Frank Borzage	William Desmond, Gloria Swanson, Herbert Prior	Drama	Triangle
A Society Sensation	Paul Powell	Carmel Myers, Rudolph Valentino	Comedy	Universal
The Song of Songs	Joseph Kaufman	Elsie Ferguson, Frank Losee, Crauford Kent	Drama	Paramount
The Song of the Soul	Tom Terriss	Alice Joyce, Percy Standing, Walter McGrail	Drama	Vitagraph
A Soul for Sale	Allen Holubar	Dorothy Phillips, Alan Roscoe, Joseph W. Girard	Drama	Universal
A Soul in Trust	Gilbert P. Hamilton	Belle Bennett, J. Barney Sherry	Drama	Triangle
The Soul of Buddha	J. Gordon Edwards	Theda Bara, Hugh Thompson	Romance	Fox
A Soul Without Windows	Travers Vale	Ethel Clayton, Frank Mayo	Drama	World
The Source	George Melford	Wallace Reid, Ann Little, Theodore Roberts	Drama	Paramount
The Spirit of '17	William Desmond Taylor	Jack Pickford, Clarence Geldart, Edythe Chapman	Drama	Paramount
The Splendid Sinner	Edwin Carewe	Mary Garden, Hamilton Revelle, Anders Randolf	War drama	Goldwyn
Sporting Life	Maurice Tourneur	Ralph Graves, Warner Richmond, Constance Binney	Sports	Independent
The Spurs of Sybil	Travers Vale	Alice Brady, John Bowers	Drama	World
The Square Deal	Lloyd Ingraham	Margarita Fischer, Jack Mower	Drama	Mutual
The Squaw Man	Cecil B. DeMille	Elliott Dexter, Ann Little, Katherine MacDonald	Western	Paramount
Station Content	Arthur Hoyt	Gloria Swanson, Lee Hill, Arthur Millett	Drama	Triangle
Stolen Hours	Travers Vale	Ethel Clayton, John Bowers, Frank Mayo	Drama	World
Stolen Orders	Harley Knoles	Montagu Love, Kitty Gordon, June Elvidge, Carlyle Blackwell	War	World
Suspicion	John M. Stahl	Grace Davison, Warren Cook, Mathilde Brundage	Drama	Independent
Stella Maris	Marshall Neilan	Mary Pickford, Herbert Standing, Conway Tearle	Drama	Paramount
The Still Alarm	Colin Campbell	Tom Santschi, Bessie Eyton, Eugenie Besserer	Drama	Selig
Stolen Honor	Richard Stanton	Virginia Pearson, Clay Clement	Drama	Fox
The Strange Woman	Edward LeSaint	Gladys Brockwell, William Scott	Drama	Fox
The Street of Seven Stars	John B. O'Brien	Doris Kenyon, Hugh Thompson	Drama	Independent
String Beans	Victor Schertzinger	Charles Ray, Jane Novak, Otto Hoffman	Comedy	Paramount
The Studio Girl	Charles Giblyn	Constance Talmadge, Earle Foxe, Johnny Hines	Comedy	Selznick
The Struggle Everlasting	James Kirkwood	Florence Reed, Milton Sills	Drama	Independent
A Successful Adventure	Harry L. Franklin	May Allison, Harry Hilliard, Frank Currier	Comedy	Metro
Such a Little Pirate	George Melford	Lila Lee, Theodore Roberts, Harrison Ford	Adventure	Paramount
Sunshine Nan	Charles Giblyn	Ann Pennington, Richard Barthelmess, Johnny Hines	Comedy	Paramount
Suspicion	John M. Stahl	Grace Davison, Warren Cook, Mathilde Brundage	Drama	Independent
Swat the Spy	Arvid E. Gillstrom	Jane Lee, Pat Hartigan	Comedy	Fox Film
Sylvia on a Spree	Harry L. Franklin	Emmy Wehlen, Frank Currier	Comedy	Metro
The Talk of the Town	Allen Holubar	Dorothy Phillips, George Fawcett, Clarissa Selwynne	Comedy	Universal
Tangled Lives	Paul Scardon	Harry T. Morey, Betty Blythe, Jean Paige	Drama	Vitagraph
Tarzan of the Apes	Scott Sidney	Elmo Lincoln, Enid Markey, Kathleen Kirkham	Adventure	First National
Tell It to the Marines	Arvid E. Gillstrom	Jane Lee, Katherine Lee	Comedy	Fox
Tempered Steel	Ralph Ince	Olga Petrova, Thomas Holding	Drama	First National
The Temple of Dusk	James Young	Sessue Hayakawa, Jane Novak, Louis Willoughby	Drama	Mutual
The Testing of Mildred Vane	Wilfred Lucas	May Allison, Darrell Foss, Nigel De Brulier	Drama	Metro
That Devil, Bateese	William Wolbert	Monroe Salisbury, Ada Gleason, Lon Chaney	Action	Universal
They're Off	Roy William Neill	Enid Bennett, Rowland V. Lee, Melbourne MacDowell	Drama	Triangle
Thieves' Gold	John Ford	Harry Carey, Molly Malone, Helen Ware	Western	Universal
The Thing We Love	Lou Tellegen	Wallace Reid, Kathlyn Williams, Tully Marshall	Drama	Paramount
Thirty a Week	Harry Beaumont	Tom Moore, Brenda Fowler, Warburton Gamble	Drama	Goldwyn
Three Mounted Men	John Ford	Harry Carey, Neva Gerber	Western	Universal
Three X Gordon	Ernest C. Warde	J. Warren Kerrigan, Lois Wilson, John Gilbert	Comedy	Hodkinson
The Tiger Man	William S. Hart	William S. Hart, Jane Novak, Milton Ross	Western	Paramount
Till I Come Back to You	Cecil B. DeMille	Bryant Washburn, Florence Vidor, Gustav von Seyffertitz	Drama	Paramount
Tinsel	Oscar Apfel	Kitty Gordon, Muriel Ostriche	Drama	World
To Hell with the Kaiser!	George Irving	Lawrence Grant, Olive Tell, Karl Dane	War comedy	Metro
To Him That Hath	Oscar Apfel	Montagu Love, Gertrude McCoy	Drama	World
To the Highest Bidder	Tom Terriss	Alice Joyce, Percy Standing, Mary Carr	Drama	Vitagraph
Together	Oscar Lund	Violet Mersereau, Chester Barnett	Drama	Universal
Tongues of Flame	Joseph Henabery	Thomas Meighan, Bessie Love	Drama	Paramount
Tony America	Thomas N. Heffron	Francis McDonald, Marie Pavis	Drama	Triangle
Too Fat to Fight	Hobart Henley	Frank McIntyre, Harold Entwistle	Comedy	Goldwyn
Too Many Millions	James Cruze	Wallace Reid, Ora Carew, Tully Marshall	Comedy	Paramount
Tosca	Edward José	Pauline Frederick, Frank Losee	Drama	Paramount
Toys of Fate	George D. Baker	Alla Nazimova, Charles Bryant, Irving Cummings	Drama	Metro
The Trail to Yesterday	Edwin Carewe	Bert Lytell, Anna Q. Nilsson	Western	Metro
The Trap	George Archainbaud	Alice Brady, Crauford Kent	Drama	World
Treason	Burton L. King	Edna Goodrich, Stuart Holmes	Drama	Mutual
Treasure Island	Sidney Franklin, Chester Franklin	Francis Carpenter, Virginia Lee Corbin	Adventure	Fox Film
The Treasure of the Sea	Frank Reicher	Edith Storey, Lew Cody	Drama	Metro
The Triumph of the Weak	Tom Terriss	Alice Joyce, Walter McGrail, Eulalie Jensen	Drama	Vitagraph
True Blue	Frank Lloyd	William Farnum, Kathryn Adams, Charles Clary	Western	Fox
The Turn of a Card	Oscar Apfel	J. Warren Kerrigan, Lois Wilson, Eugene Pallette	Comedy drama	Hodkinson
The Turn of the Wheel	Reginald Barker	Geraldine Farrar, Herbert Rawlinson, Percy Marmont	Drama	Goldwyn
Two-Gun Betty	Howard Hickman	Bessie Barriscale, Lee Shumway	Western comedy	Pathe Exchange
The Two-Soul Woman	Elmer Clifton	Priscilla Dean, Ashton Dearholt, Joseph W. Girard	Drama	Universal
Tyrant Fear	Roy William Neill	Dorothy Dalton, Thurston Hall, Melbourne MacDowell	Drama	Paramount

== U–V ==
Title	Director	Cast	Genre	Notes
The Unbeliever	Alan Crosland	Marguerite Courtot, Raymond McKee, Erich von Stroheim	War	Edison
The Unchastened Woman	William J. Humphrey	Grace Valentine, Frank R. Mills, Paul Panzer	Drama	World
Unclaimed Goods	Rollin S. Sturgeon	Vivian Martin, Harrison Ford, Casson Ferguson	Comedy	Paramount
Uncle Tom's Cabin	J. Searle Dawley	Marguerite Clark, Sam Hardy, Frank Losee	Historical	Paramount
Under Suspicion	Will S. Davis	Francis X. Bushman, Beverly Bayne	Comedy	Metro
Under the Yoke	J. Gordon Edwards	Theda Bara, G. Raymond Nye	Drama	Fox
Under the Greenwood Tree	Émile Chautard	Elsie Ferguson, Eugene O'Brien	Drama	Paramount
Uneasy Money	Lawrence C. Windom	Taylor Holmes, Virginia Valli, Arthur W. Bates	Comedy	Essanay
Unexpected Places	E. Mason Hopper	Bert Lytell, Rhea Mitchell, Rosemary Theby	Comedy	Metro
Untamed	Clifford Smith	Roy Stewart, Ethel Fleming	Western	Triangle
Up Romance Road	Henry King	William Russell, Charlotte Burton, Carl Stockdale	Comedy	Mutual
Up the Road with Sallie	William Desmond Taylor	Constance Talmadge, Norman Kerry, Kate Toncray	Comedy	Selznick
The Uphill Path	James Kirkwood	Catherine Calvert, Guy Coombs	Drama	Independent
The Vamp	Jerome Storm	Enid Bennett, Douglas MacLean, Charles K. French	Comedy	Paramount
The Vanity Pool	Ida May Park	Mary MacLaren, Anna Q. Nilsson, Thomas Holding	Drama	Universal
The Velvet Hand	Douglas Gerrard	Fritzi Brunette, William Conklin, Gino Corrado	Drama	Universal
Vengeance	Travers Vale	Montagu Love, Barbara Castleton, George MacQuarrie	Drama	World
The Venus Model	Clarence G. Badger	Mabel Normand, Rod La Rocque	Romantic comedy	Goldwyn
Virtuous Wives	George Loane Tucker	Anita Stewart, Conway Tearle, Hedda Hopper	Drama	First National
Vive la France!	Roy William Neill	Dorothy Dalton, Edmund Lowe	War	Paramount
Viviette	Walter Edwards	Vivian Martin, Eugene Pallette, Harrison Ford	Drama	Paramount
The Voice of Destiny	William Bertram	Marie Osborne, J. Morris Foster	Mystery	Pathe Exchange
The Vortex	Gilbert P. Hamilton	Mary Warren, Joe King	Drama	Triangle

== W–Z ==
Title	Director	Cast	Genre	Notes
Waifs	Albert Parker	Gladys Hulette, Creighton Hale, J.H. Gilmour	Comedy drama	Pathe Exchange
Wanted: A Mother	Harley Knoles	Madge Evans, George MacQuarrie, Gerda Holmes	Drama	World
Wanted for Murder	Frank Hall Crane	Elaine Hammerstein, Irene Franklin	War	Independent
The Wasp	Lionel Belmore	Kitty Gordon, Rockliffe Fellowes	Comedy	World
The Way of a Man with a Maid	Donald Crisp	Bryant Washburn, Wanda Hawley, Fred Goodwins	Comedy	Paramount
The Way Out	George Kelson	June Elvidge, Carlyle Blackwell, Kate Lester	Drama	World
We Can't Have Everything	Cecil B. DeMille	Kathlyn Williams, Elliott Dexter, Wanda Hawley	Drama	Paramount
We Should Worry	Kenean Buel	Jane Lee, Rubye De Remer	Comedy	Fox
A Weaver of Dreams	John H. Collins	Viola Dana, Clifford Bruce, Mildred Davis	Drama	Metro
Wedlock	Wallace Worsley	Louise Glaum, John Gilbert, Herschel Mayall	Drama	Hodkinson
Western Blood	Lynn Reynolds	Tom Mix, Victoria Forde, Barney Furey	Western	Fox
Whatever the Cost	Robert Ensminger	Anita King, Gordon Sackville	Western	Independent
When a Woman Sins	J. Gordon Edwards	Theda Bara, Josef Swickard, Alan Roscoe	Drama	Fox
When Do We Eat?	Fred Niblo	Enid Bennett, Albert Ray, Robert McKim	Comedy	Paramount
When Men Betray	Ivan Abramson	Gail Kane, Sally Crute, Stuart Holmes	Drama	Independent
Which Woman?	Tod Browning, Harry A. Pollard	Ella Hall, A. Edward Sutherland	Drama	Universal
The Whims of Society	Travers Vale	Ethel Clayton, Frank Mayo	Drama	World
The Whirlpool	Alan Crosland	Alice Brady, Holmes Herbert, William B. Davidson	Crime	Selznick
The Whispering Chorus	Cecil B. DeMille	Raymond Hatton, Kathlyn Williams, Edythe Chapman	Drama	Paramount
The White Lie	Howard Hickman	Bessie Barriscale, Edward Coxen	Mystert	Hodkinson
The White Man's Law	James Young	Sessue Hayakawa, Florence Vidor, Jack Holt	Drama	Paramount
Who Is to Blame?	Frank Borzage	Yutaka Abe, Jack Livingston	Drama	Triangle
Who Killed Walton?	Thomas N. Heffron	J. Barney Sherry, Ed Brady	Mystery	Triangle
Who Loved Him Best?	Dell Henderson	Edna Goodrich, Tallulah Bankhead, Herbert Evans	Drama	Mutual
Why America Will Win	Richard Stanton	Ernest Maupain, Frank McGlynn	War drama	Fox
Why I Would Not Marry	Richard Stanton	Lucy Fox, Edward Sedgwick	Comedy drama	Fox
The Widow's Might	William C. deMille	Julian Eltinge, Florence Vidor, Gustav von Seyffertitz	Comedy	Paramount
The Wife He Bought	Harry Solter	Carmel Myers, Kenneth Harlan, Howard Crampton	Drama	Universal
Wild Honey	Francis J. Grandon	Doris Kenyon, Frank R. Mills, Herbert Standing	Western	Independent
Wild Life	Henry Otto	William Desmond, Josie Sedgwick	Western	Triangle
Wild Primrose	Frederick A. Thomson	Gladys Leslie, Richard Barthelmess, Eulalie Jensen	Drama	Vitagraph
The Wild Strain	William Wolbert	Nell Shipman, Gayne Whitman, Otto Lederer	Comedy	Vitagraph
Wild Women	John Ford	Harry Carey, Molly Malone, Martha Mattox	Western	Universal
Wild Youth	George Melford	Louise Huff, Theodore Roberts, Jack Mulhall	Drama	Paramount
The Wildcat of Paris	Joseph De Grasse	Priscilla Dean, Edward Cecil	War drama	Universal
The Winding Trail	John H. Collins	Viola Dana, Clifford Bruce, Hayward Mack	Western	Metro
The Wine Girl	Stuart Paton	Carmel Myers, Rex De Rosselli, Kenneth Harlan	Drama	Universal
Winner Takes All	Elmer Clifton	Monroe Salisbury, Betty Schade, Sam De Grasse	Western	Universal
Winning Grandma	William Bertram	Marie Osborne, J. Morris Foster	Comedy	Pathe Exchange
The Winning of Beatrice	Harry L. Franklin	May Allison, Hale Hamilton	Comedy	Metro
The Witch Woman	Travers Vale	Ethel Clayton, Frank Mayo	Drama	World
Without Honor	E. Mason Hopper	Margery Wilson, Walt Whitman	Drama	Triangle
With Hoops of Steel	Eliot Howe	Henry B. Walthall, Mary Charleson, Joseph J. Dowling	Western	Hodkinson
With Neatness and Dispatch	Will S. Davis	Francis X. Bushman, Beverly Bayne, Frank Currier	Comedy	Metro
Within the Cup	Raymond B. West	Bessie Barriscale, Edward Coxen	Drama	Independent
Wives and Other Wives	Lloyd Ingraham	Mary Miles Minter, Colin Chase	Comedy	Pathe Exchange
Wives of Men	John M. Stahl	Florence Reed, Mathilde Brundage	Drama	Independent
The Wolf and His Mate	Edward LeSaint	Louise Lovely, Jack Hoxie	Adventure	Universal
Wolves of the Border	Clifford Smith	Roy Stewart, Josie Sedgwick	Western	Triangle
Wolves of the Rail	William S. Hart	William S. Hart, Melbourne MacDowell, Vola Vale	Western	Paramount
Woman	Maurice Tourneur	Warren Cook, Florence Billings, Flore Revalles	Drama	Independent
The Woman and the Law	Raoul Walsh	Miriam Cooper, Ramsey Wallace	Drama	Fox
Woman and Wife	Edward José	Alice Brady, Elliott Dexter, Helen Lindroth	Drama	Selznick
The Woman Between Friends	Tom Terriss	Alice Joyce, Marc McDermott	Drama	Vitagraph
The Woman the Germans Shot	John G. Adolfi	Julia Arthur, Creighton Hale, Paul Panzer	War	Selznick
A Woman of Impulse	Edward José	Lina Cavalieri, Gertrude Robinson, Raymond Bloomer	Drama	Paramount
A Woman of Redemption	Travers Vale	June Elvidge, John Bowers	Drama	World
The Woman Who Gave	Kenean Buel	Evelyn Nesbit, Irving Cummings	Drama	Fox
A Woman's Experience	Perry N. Vekroff	Sam Hardy, Mary Boland, Lawrence McGill	Drama	Independent
A Woman's Fool	John Ford	Harry Carey, Betty Schade, Molly Malone	Western	Universal
Women's Weapons	Robert G. Vignola	Ethel Clayton, Elliott Dexter, Vera Doria	Comedy	Paramount
The Wooing of Princess Pat	William P.S. Earle	Gladys Leslie, J. Frank Glendon	Fantasy	Vitagraph
The World for Sale	J. Stuart Blackton	Conway Tearle, Ann Little	Drama	Vitagraph
The Yellow Dog	Colin Campbell	Arthur Hoyt, Antrim Short, Clara Horton	Drama	Universal
The Yellow Ticket	William Parke	Fannie Ward, Milton Sills, Warner Oland	Drama	Pathe Exchange
You Can't Believe Everything	Jack Conway	Gloria Swanson, Darrell Foss	Drama	Triangle
The Zero Hour	Travers Vale	June Elvidge, Frank Mayo	Drama	World

== Documentaries ==
Title	Director	Cast	Genre	Notes
America's Answer	Edwin F. Glenn			
Among the Cannibal Isles of the South Pacific	Martin E. Johnson		Documentary	

== Shorts ==
Title	Director	Cast	Genre	Notes
The Accident Attorney	Bud Fisher		Comedy	
The Accusing Toe	King Vidor	Sadie Clayton	Comedy	
Are Crooks Dishonest?	Gilbert Pratt	Harold Lloyd, Snub Pollard	Comedy	
Back to the Woods	Hal Roach	Harold Lloyd, Bebe Daniels	Short Comedy	
Beat It	Gilbert Pratt	Harold Lloyd	Comedy	
Bees in His Bonnet	Gilbert Pratt	Harold Lloyd	Comedy	
The Bell Boy	Roscoe Arbuckle	Fatty Arbuckle, Buster Keaton	Comedy short	
The Bond	Charles Chaplin	Charles Chaplin, Edna Purviance, Sydney Chaplin	Propaganda	
Bride and Gloom	Alfred J. Goulding	Harold Lloyd, Bebe Daniels	Comedy	
Bud's Recruit	King Vidor	Wallace Brennan	Comedy	
The Chocolate of the Gang	King Vidor	Thomas Bellamy	Short Drama	
The City Slicker	Gilbert Pratt	Harold Lloyd, Bebe Daniels	Short Comedy	
The Cook	Roscoe Arbuckle	Fatty Arbuckle, Buster Keaton	Short Comedy	
A Dog's Life	Charles Chaplin	Charlie Chaplin, Edna Purviance	Short Comedy	
Fireman Save My Child	Alfred J. Goulding	Harold Lloyd	Comedy	
Follow the Crowd	Alfred J. Goulding	Harold Lloyd	Comedy	
A Gasoline Wedding	Alfred J. Goulding	Harold Lloyd, Bebe Daniels	Comedy	
Hear 'Em Rave	Gilbert Pratt	Harold Lloyd, Bebe Daniels	Comedy	
Here Come the Girls	Fred Fishback	Harold Lloyd	Comedy	
Hey There!	Alfred J. Goulding	Harold Lloyd	Comedy	
Hit Him Again	Gilbert Pratt	Harold Lloyd	Comedy	
I'm a Man	King Vidor	Martin Pendleton	Comedy	
It's a Wild Life	Gilbert Pratt	Harold Lloyd	Comedy	
Kicked Out	Alfred J. Goulding	Harold Lloyd	Comedy	
Kicking the Germ Out of Germany	Alfred J. Goulding	Harold Lloyd, Bebe Daniels	Comedy	
The Lamb	Gilbert Pratt, Harold Lloyd	Harold Lloyd, Bebe Daniels	Comedy	
Let's Go	Alfred J. Goulding	Harold Lloyd, Bebe Daniels	Comedy	
Look Pleasant, Please	Alfred J. Goulding	Harold Lloyd, Bebe Daniels	Comedy	
The Lost Lie	King Vidor	Ruth Hampton	Comedy	
Lost on Dress Parade	Martin Justice	Patsy De Forest	Drama	
Moonshine	Roscoe Arbuckle	Fatty Arbuckle, Buster Keaton	Comedy	
The Non-Stop Kid	Gilbert Pratt	Harold Lloyd	Comedy	
Nothing But Trouble		Harold Lloyd, Bebe Daniels	Comedy	
On the Jump	Alfred J. Goulding	Harold Lloyd	Comedy	
Out of the Inkwell	Max Fleischer, Dave Fleischer		Animated series	
Out West	Roscoe Arbuckle	Fatty Arbuckle, Buster Keaton	Comedy	
An Ozark Romance	Alfred J. Goulding	Harold Lloyd, Bebe Daniels	Comedy	
Pipe the Whiskers	Alfred J. Goulding	Harold Lloyd	Comedy	
She Loves Me Not		Harold Lloyd, Bebe Daniels	Comedy	
Sic 'Em, Towser	Gilbert Pratt	Harold Lloyd	Comedy	
The Sinking of the Lusitania	Winsor McCay		short animated propaganda	
Somewhere in Turkey	Alfred J. Goulding	Harold Lloyd, Bebe Daniels	Comedy	
Swing Your Partners	Alfred J. Goulding	Harold Lloyd, Bebe Daniels	Comedy	
Tad's Swimming Hole	King Vidor	Ernest Butterworth	Comedy	
Take a Chance	Alfred J. Goulding	Harold Lloyd, Bebe Daniels	Comedy	
That's Him	Gilbert Pratt	Harold Lloyd, Bebe Daniels	Comedy	
The Tip	Billy Gilbert, Gilbert Pratt	Harold Lloyd, Bebe Daniels	Comedy	
Triple Trouble	Charles Chaplin, Leo White	Charlie Chaplin	Comedy	
Two-Gun Gussie	Alfred J. Goulding	Harold Lloyd	Comedy	
Two Scrambled	Gilbert Pratt	Harold Lloyd, Bebe Daniels	Comedy	
Why Pick on Me?		Harold Lloyd, Bebe Daniels	Comedy	

== See also ==
- 1918 in the United States
