= Leon H. Caverly =

American war photographer and film cameraman

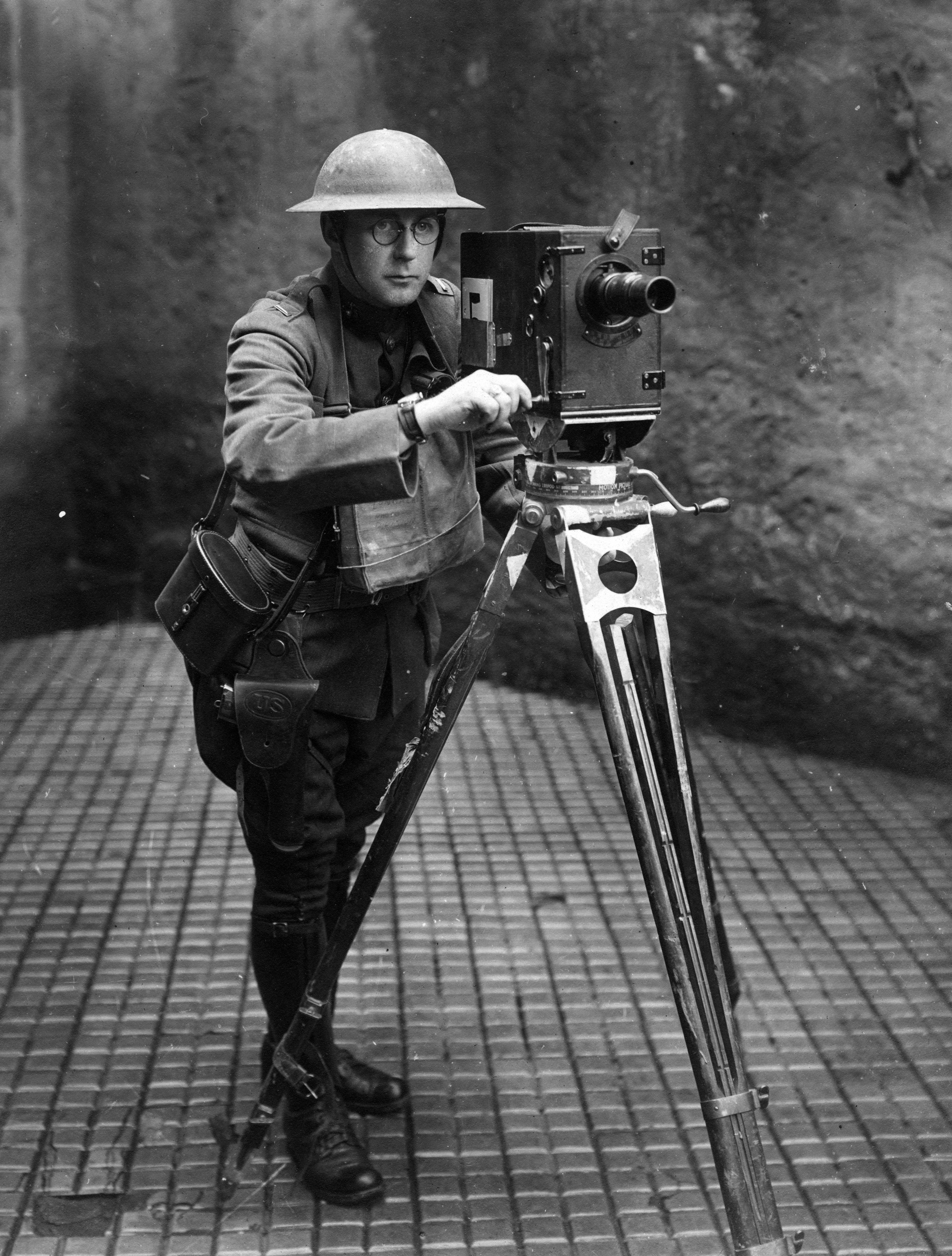
- Leon Caverly with movie camera, 1917
- Born: November 22, 1884; Dover, New Hampshire
- Died: December 12, 1966 (aged 82); New York City, New York
- Occupation: photographer/newsreel cinematographer

Leon Hollis Caverly (1884-1966) was an official photographer with the U.S. Marine Corps and 2nd Division, A.E.F, and the first cameraman to land in Europe in July 1917 with the American Expeditionary Forces to film the U.S. entry into World War I.

== Biography ==
Leon Hollis Caverly was born on November 22, 1884, in Dover, New Hampshire. He started working as a photographer in his hometown Lynn, Massachusetts, around 1905. Caverly became a newsreel cameraman around 1914, working for Mutual Weekly and Universal Animated Weekly. Apart from his work on these first American newsreels, Caverly is also credited as cameraman for the film A Daughter of the Gods (1916), directed by Herbert Brenon for the Fox Film Corporation.

On April 30, 1917, Caverly was enrolled as a Quartermaster Sergeant in the U.S. Marine Corps Reserve. From that moment he was transferred to the Marine Corps Publicity Bureau to boost the recruitment campaign with fresh pictures and film. The Marine Corps sent Caverly to Europe in June 1917 to record the first shipment of American soldiers to France.

Caverly sailed with the 5th Regiment, U.S. Marine Corps. He covered the 4th Marine Brigade training for war, the occupation of the American trenches near Verdun, as well as most of the major campaigns of the 2nd Division (A.E.F): Château-Thierry, the Third Battle of the Aisne (Belleau Wood), the Aisne-Marne offensive (Soissons), the Defensive Sector at Marbache, the St. Mihiel Offensive, the Battle of Blanc Mont Ridge, the Meuse–Argonne offensive, and the 3rd U.S. Army occupation of the Koblenz bridgehead, Germany, in 1919. Caverly was promoted to 2nd Lieutenant in the Marine Corps on July 16, 1918. On December 15, 1918, Caverly was transferred to the photographic section of the 7th Army Corps. From January until April 1919 he was in Germany with the 3rd Army Corps. He was honorably discharged from the U.S. Marine Corps on April 21, 1920.

Caverly remained active as a photographer throughout his life. In the 1920s he worked for Newman Travel Talks, producing films and photographs across the globe. In the 1930s he took up a job as a photostat operator in New York City until his retirement at 72. Leon Caverly died in Queens, New York, on December 12, 1966. He was buried at Long Island National Cemetery in Farmingdale, New York.

== Film work ==
Caverly was by all accounts the first official cinematographer to film the Great War with the American forces. His films and photographs record the U.S. troops in Europe from the first landings in France until the occupation of Germany in 1919. As the photographic officer for the 5th Marine Regiment and the 2nd Division, Caverly contributed to many war films that are now in the National Archives in Washington, D.C., notably a three-reel compilation on the 2nd Division during the Great War, documentary footage on the arrival of the U.S. Marines in France and the activities in the Bourmont training area, as well as the occupation of the Toulon and Troyons sectors, the occupation of the Château-Thierry sector, and the march of his unit into Germany. A list of footage shot by Caverly was compiled in 2017 by film historians Ron van Dopperen and Cooper C. Graham.

Leon Caverly with movie camera circa 1917

This pictorial coverage, as well as Caverly's letters and notebook on his experiences as a war photographer, represent an invaluable historical record. Caverly is also credited as cinematographer for America's Answer, the second and most successful official World War I film produced by the Committee on Public Information (CPI), America's wartime propaganda agency.

War on the Western Front/ pictures by Leon Caverly, 1917-1918

Caverly's life and work featured in an article by film historians Ron van Dopperen and Cooper C. Graham for the Historical Journal of Film, Radio & Television that was published in 2017: First to Film: Leon H. Caverly and the U.S. Marine Corps in World War I, 1917-1919.

Caverly's film work during World War I also featured in the documentary Mobilizing Movies! The U.S. Signal Corps Goes to War, 1917-1919.

Documentary on the official American film cameramen in World War I

In 2018, Richard Pelster-Wiebe published a dissertation on Caverly's film work during World War I.

== Sources ==
- James W. Castellan, Ron van Dopperen, Cooper C. Graham, American Cinematographers in the Great War, 1914-1918 (New Barnet 2014) https://doi.org/10.2307%2Fj.ctt1bmzn8c
- Book review "American Cinematographers in the Great War, 1914-1914" Historical Journal of Film, Radio & Television (2016)
- Ron van Dopperen and Cooper C. Graham, "First to Film: Leon H. Caverly and the U.S. Marine Corps in World War I, 1917-1919" Historical Journal of Film, Radio & Television (August 2017), 447–473. http://dx.doi.org/10.1080/01439685.2017.1357352
- Ron van Dopperen and Cooper C. Graham, The Growth of Official Military Cinema in the United States, 1917-1919 (2017)
- Weblog on the American Films and Cinematographers of World War I, 2013-2018
- Richard Pelster-Wiebe, "In the jaws of death: Leon Caverly's camera-history of World War I." PhD (Doctor of Philosophy) thesis, University of Iowa, 2018.

https://doi.org/10.17077/etd.vayn-ulzc

- Leon. H. Caverly, U.S. Marine Corps World War I Cameraman (pictures by Caverly taken on the Western Front, 1918)
- "My Trip Overseas" - Personal notes by Caverly on his film and photographic coverage of World War I (1918/1919)
- Military Record File Leon. H. Caverly in World War I (1917-1919)
- "Mobilizing Movies! The U.S. Signal Corps Goes To War, 1917-1919" (documentary, 4K improved video edit, 2026)
- "Photographic Activities U.S. Signal Corps During World War I" (reconstruction, 4K improved video edit, 2026)
- American Cameramen in World War I - video reconstruction with Signal Corps pictures (2026)
- Movie Trailer "American Cinematographers in the Great War, 1914-1918"
