= The Man Who Woke Up =

The Man Who Woke Up may refer to:

- The Man Who Woke Up (1918 film), an American silent film directed by James McLaughlin
- The Man Who Woke Up (1921 film), an American short Western film directed by Lee Kohlmar
