= Follow the Crowd (film) =

1918 film

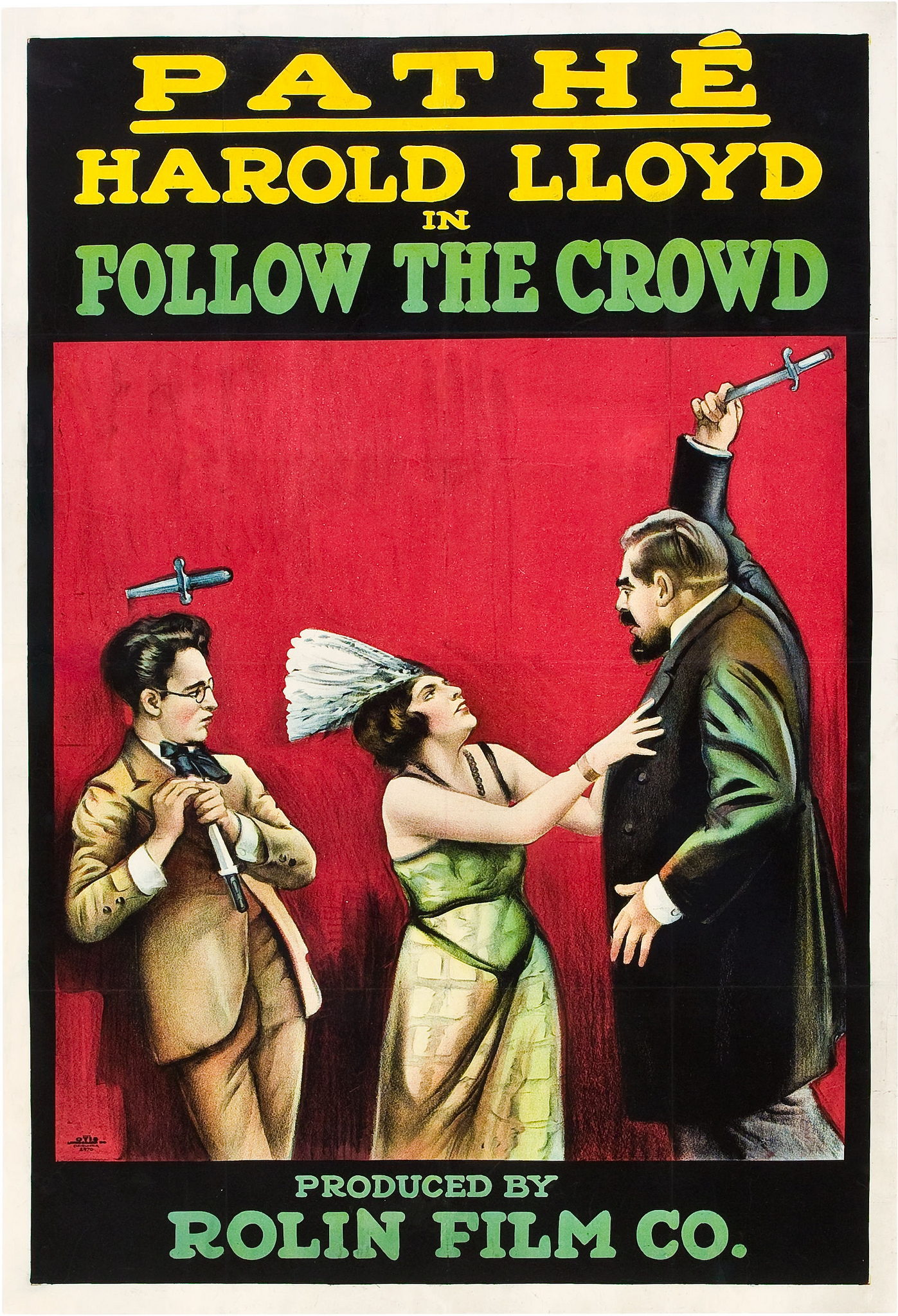
- Poster for the film.
- Directed by: Alfred J. Goulding
- Produced by: Hal Roach
- Starring: Harold Lloyd
- Production company: Rolin Film Company
- Distributed by: Pathé Exchange
- Release date: April 7, 1918
- Running time: 10 minutes
- Country: United States
- Language: Silent with English intertitles

Follow the Crowd is a 1918 American short comedy film with Harold Lloyd. Previously thought to be a lost film, the SilentEra website says now that a "print exists". A truncated version (of slightly less than seven minutes), with both English and Spanish intertitles, was posted on YouTube in 2016. The film's plot has Harold accidentally getting involved with a terrorist group.

== Cast ==
- Harold Lloyd
- Snub Pollard
- Bebe Daniels
- William Blaisdell
- Billy Fay (as B. Fay)
- Helen Gilmore
- Dee Lampton
- Gus Leonard
- Marvin Loback
- James Parrott
- Charles Stevenson
- Dorothea Wolbert

== See also ==
- List of American films of 1918
