= Bride and Gloom (film) =

1918 film

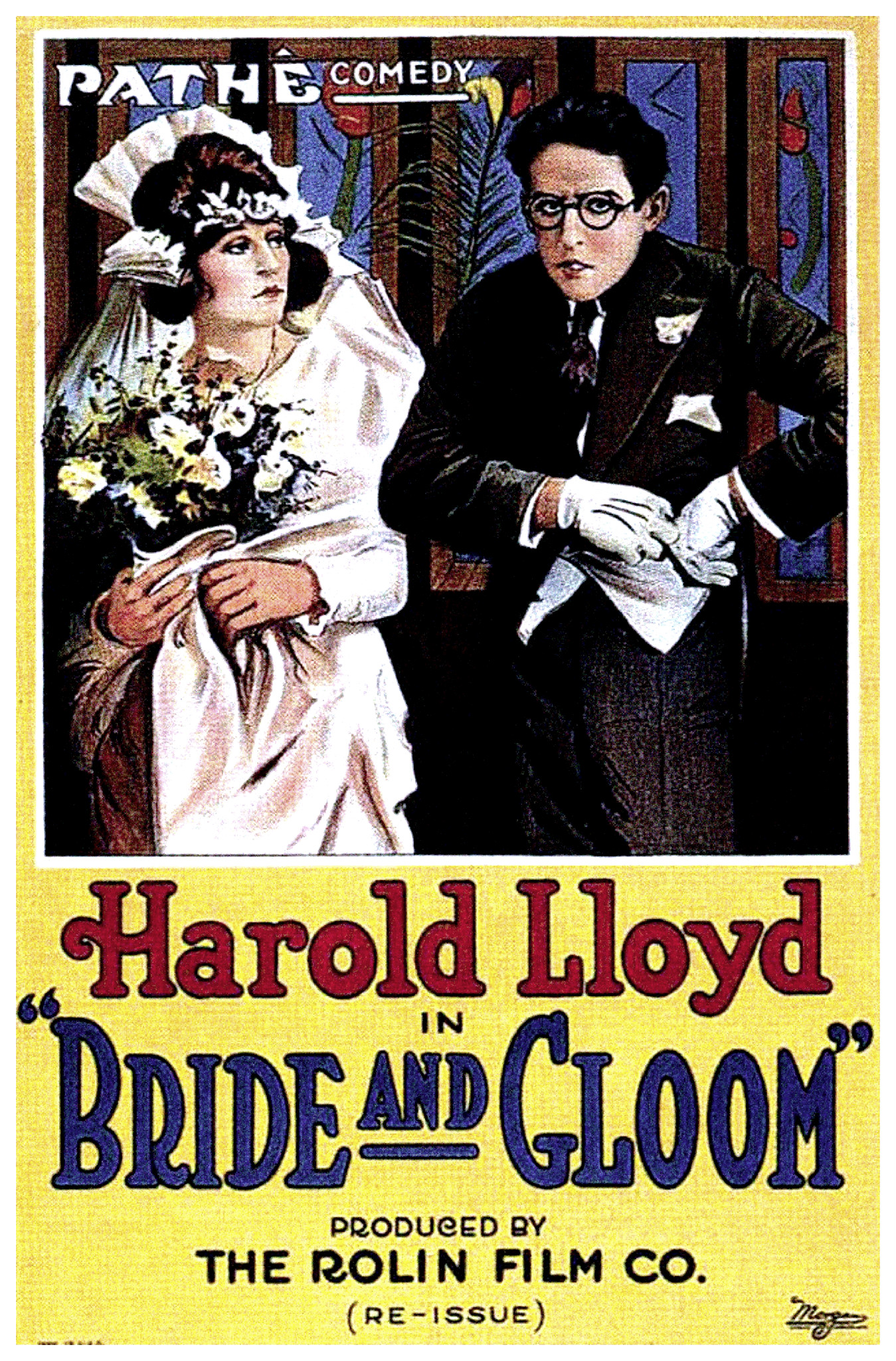
- Theatrical poster to Bride and Gloom
- Directed by: Alfred J. Goulding
- Produced by: Hal Roach
- Starring: Harold Lloyd
- Release date: August 18, 1918
- Country: United States
- Language: Silent (English intertitles)

Bride and Gloom is a 1918 American short comedy film starring Harold Lloyd. It is presumed to be a lost film. Like many American films of the time, Bride and Gloom was subject to restrictions and cuts by city and state film censorship boards. For example, the Chicago Board of Censors required a cut of two scenes of Lloyd in berth with woman.

== Cast ==
- Harold Lloyd as Groom
- Bebe Daniels as Bride
- Snub Pollard
- William Gillespie
- Helen Gilmore
- Lew Harvey
- James Parrott
- Charles Stevenson (credited as Charles E. Stevenson)

== See also ==
- List of American films of 1918
