= Reputation (1921 film) =

1921 film

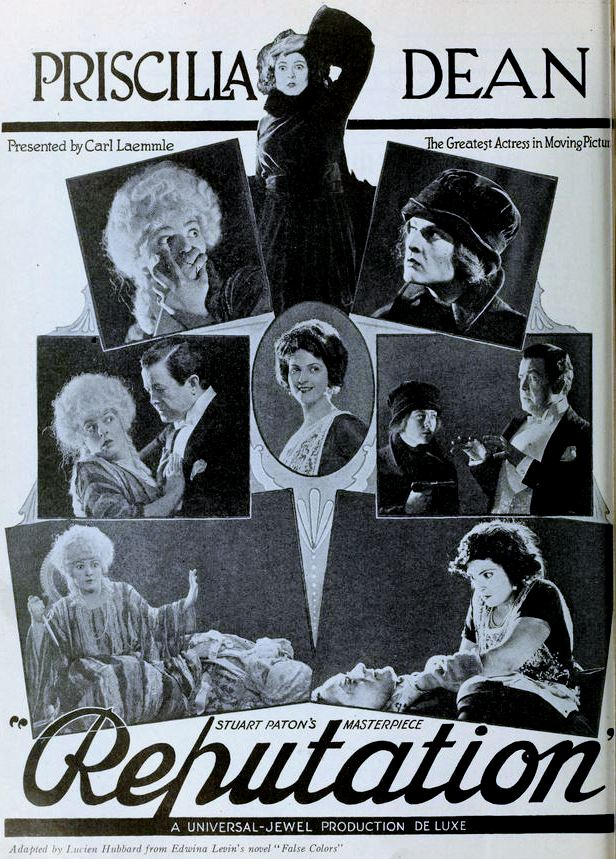
- Advertisement in Film Daily (May 8, 1921)
- Directed by: Stuart Paton
- Written by: Lucien Hubbard (scenario); Doris Schroeder (scenario)
- Based on: "False Colors" by Edwina LeVin
- Produced by: Irving Thalberg
- Starring: Priscilla Dean
- Cinematography: Harold Janes
- Music by: Hugo Riesenfeld
- Distributed by: Universal Film Manufacturing Company
- Release date: May 1921
- Running time: 7 reels (7,153 feet)
- Country: United States
- Language: Silent (English intertitles)

Reputation is a lost 1921 American silent drama film produced and distributed by the Universal Film Manufacturing Company and directed by Stuart Paton. Priscilla Dean stars in what was considered one of her finest performances.

== Cast ==
- Priscilla Dean as Fay McMillan, Laura Figlan, Pauline Stevens
- Mae Giraci as Pauline Stevens, as a child (credited as May Giraci)
- Harry von Meter as Monty Edwards (credited as Harry Van Meter)
- Harry Carter as Dan Frawley
- Niles Welch as Jimmie Dorn
- William Welsh as Max Gossman
- Spottiswoode Aitken as Karl
- Rex De Rosselli as Theater Owner
- William Archibald as Photographer
- Harry S. Webb as Photographer's Assistant (credited as Harry Webb)
- Madge Hunt as Matron
- Al Ernest Garcia as Leading Man (stage sequence)
- James McLaughlin as Heavy Man (stage sequence)
- Kathleen Myers as Ingenue (stage sequence)
- Marion Mack as Ingenue (stage sequence) (credited as Joey McCreery)
- Alice H. Smith as Charwoman (stage sequence)
- François Dumas as Char-man (stage sequence)
- Joe Ray as Stage manager (stage sequence)
