= The Lost Lie =

1918 film directed by King Vidor

- Directed by: King Vidor
- Written by: Judge Willis Brown
- Produced by: Judge Willis Brown
- Starring: Ruth Hampton
- Release date: 1918
- Country: United States
- Language: Silent with English intertitles

The Lost Lie is a 1918 American short comedy film directed by King Vidor.

== Cast ==
- Ruth Hampton
- Mike O'Rourke
- William Vaughn
- Judge Willis Brown (as himself)

== Production ==
The Lost Lie is one of ten short films written and produced by Judge Willis Brown that were directed by King Vidor. They were filmed at Boy City Film Company in Culver City, California and released by General Film Company between January and May 1918.

Film historian and archivist Raymond Durgnat reports that all of Vidor’s films from the Judge Willis Brown series are lost, with the exception of Bud's Recruit of which one reel survives.

== Theme ==
Brown was a Salt Lake City juvenile court judge who specialized in “rehabilitating juvenile offenders.” He based the series on his experiences operating his “Boy’s Cities” (not to be confused with Boys Town). The movies depict “inter-ethnic” city youth facing and resolving social and moral challenges constructively. Director Vidor declared that he "deeply believed" in the value of the films.
