= The Chocolate of the Gang =

1918 film by King Vidor

- Directed by: King Vidor
- Written by: Judge Willis Brown
- Produced by: Judge Willis Brown
- Starring: Thomas Bellamy
- Production company: Boy City Film
- Distributed by: General Film Company
- Release date: January 26, 1918
- Running time: 2 reels (approx. 20 minutes)
- Country: United States
- Language: Silent (English intertitles)

The Chocolate of the Gang is a 1918 American silent short comedy film directed by King Vidor.

== Cast ==
- Ruth Hampton as The Heiress
- Thomas Bellamy as Black Boy
- Ernest Butterworth Jr. as White Boy
- Judge Willis Brown as himself / Commentator

== Reception ==
Like many American films of the time, The Chocolate of the Gang was subject to cuts by city and state film censorship boards. For example, the Chicago Board of Censors required a cut, in Reel 1, of a front view of the nude Black Boy and, in Reel 2, three views of Black Boy through the periscope with pigeons in crate. The Kansas Board of Review made similar eliminations.

== See also ==
- List of American films of 1918
