= The Spirit of '17 =

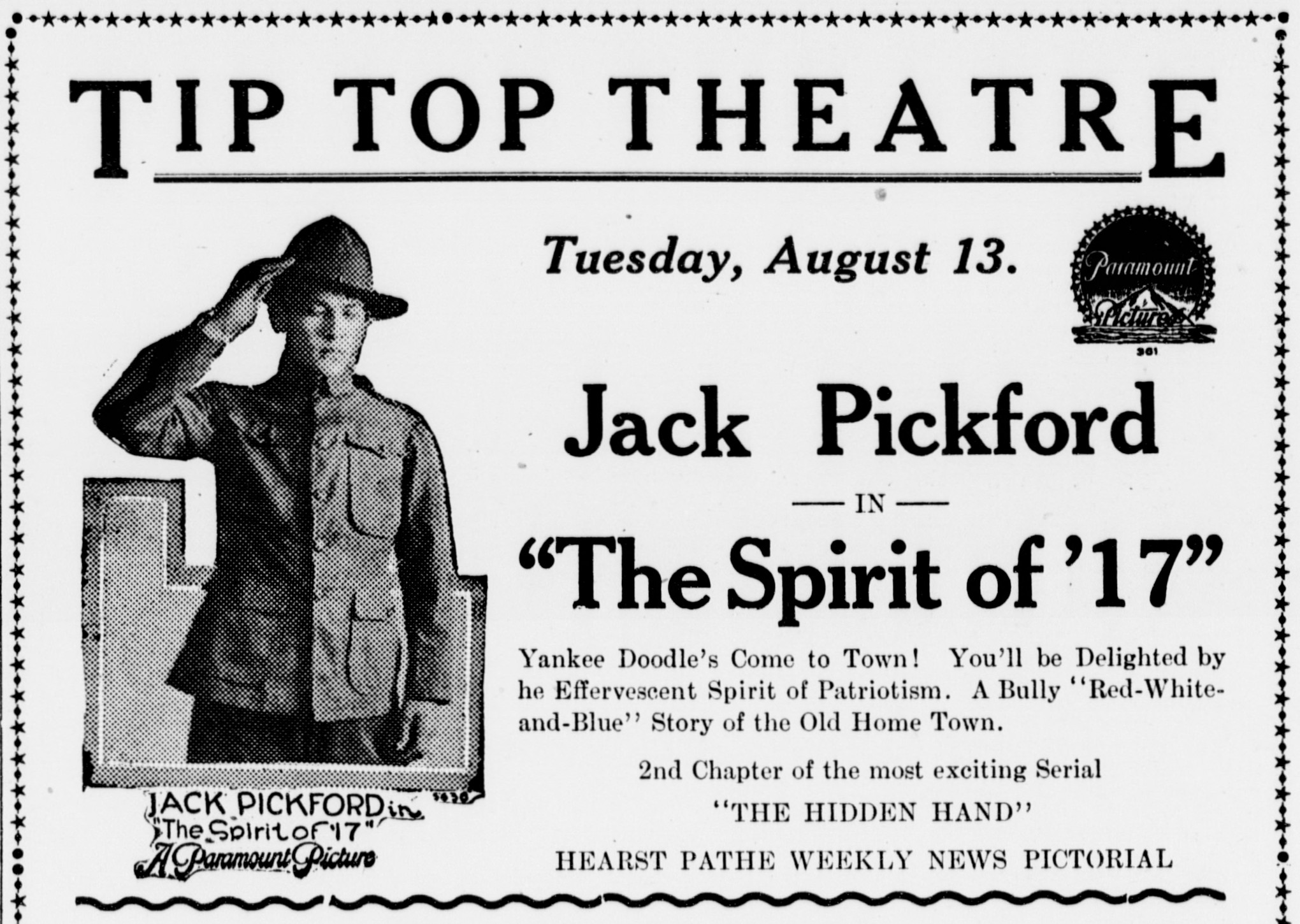
- Newspaper advertisement
- Directed by: William Desmond Taylor
- Screenplay by: Judge Willis Brown; Julia Crawford Ivers
- Produced by: Jesse L. Lasky
- Starring: Jack Pickford; Clarence Geldart; Edythe Chapman; L.N. Wells; Charles Arling; Virginia Ware
- Cinematography: Homer Scott
- Production company: Jesse L. Lasky Feature Play Company
- Distributed by: Paramount Pictures
- Release date: January 26, 1918
- Running time: 50 minutes
- Country: United States
- Language: Silent (English intertitles)

The Spirit of '17 is a lost 1918 American silent drama film directed by William Desmond Taylor and written by Judge Willis Brown and Julia Crawford Ivers. The film stars Jack Pickford, Clarence Geldart, Edythe Chapman, L.N. Wells, Charles Arling, and Virginia Ware. The film was released on January 26, 1918, by Paramount Pictures and, like several other films released shortly after the American entry into World War I, had a patriotic theme. Several of the intertitles of this film had messages at the bottom which encouraged young men to enlist.

== Plot ==
As described in a film magazine, when the American Civil War veterans staying at an old soldiers' home in a small town hear that young men are not volunteering for military service, they attempt to enlist but are rejected, much to the amusement of some idle young rich men. This includes Randall Lee, whose father Thomas Lee owns large mining interests such as the local Top Copper mine. Davy Glidden, a boy scout whose father Adjutant Glidden is in charge of the old soldiers' home, wants to serve but is too young to join the army. While on a secret investigation, Davy overhears two German spies, Carl Bender and Frank Schmale, planning to cripple the Lee mine and take a large amount of its product back to their native land. With the assistance of men from the old soldiers' home, the spies are rounded up and brought before the laboring men of the mine before they can do any damage and the Edwards family, who had been visiting the Lee's, are saved. Davy believes that he is in love with the Edwards' daughter Flora, although she is several years older than him. Randall sees the bravery of Davy and the veterans of the old soldiers' home and, ashamed of himself, enlists.

== Cast ==
- Jack Pickford as Davy Glidden
- Clarence Geldart as Adjutant Glidden
- Edythe Chapman as Mrs. Glidden
- L.N. Wells as Capt. Jerico Norton
- Charles Arling as John Edwards
- Virginia Ware as Mrs. Edwards
- Katherine MacDonald as Flora Edwards
- Jim Farley as Carl Bender
- Seymour Hastings as Frank Schmale
- William Chester as Tom Brand
- Helen Jerome Eddy as Susan Brand
- John Burton as Thomas Lee
- Ashton Dearholt as Randall Lee
- Tom Bates as Cpl. Trimble
- Jack W. Johnston as Pvt. Butler

== Reception ==
Like many American films of the time, The Spirit of '17 was subject to cuts by city and state film censorship boards. For example, the Chicago Board of Censors required a cut of a scene with the cutting of telephone wires.
