= I'm a Man (film) =

1918 film directed by King Vidor

- Directed by: King Vidor
- Written by: Judge Willis Brown
- Produced by: Judge Willis Brown
- Starring: Martin Pendleton
- Release date: April 21, 1918
- Country: United States
- Languages: Silent; English intertitles

I'm a Man is a 1918 American short comedy film directed by King Vidor.

== Cast ==
- Martin Pendleton

== Plot ==
A boy (Pendleton) demonstrates that his German-American family is more loyal to the United States than a devious French immigrant.
