= Willis Brown =

American judge

Salt Lake City Juvenile Court judge
- In office 1905–1907

Personal details
- Born: July 31, 1881 Columbus, Indiana
- Died: April 30, 1933 (aged 51) Los Angeles, California
- Occupation: Film producer
- Known for: Founder of Boy City Film Company

Willis Brown (July 31, 1881 – April 30, 1933) was a permanently removed Utah juvenile court judge, falsely-claimed lawyer, self-described humanitarian, and filmmaker.

Born James Willhenry Brown in Columbus, Indiana to James W. Brown and Lucetta Pierson.

== Judge ==
In the decade of the 1900s Brown lectured on the Chautauqua circuit as a judge of the Utah Juvenile Court and a progressive expert on boys' reformation.

He was appointed to the Juvenile Court in Salt Lake City in the spring of 1905, served two years, but had been permanently removed by the Utah Supreme Court. In 1910, the Juvenile Court debunked Judge Brown's credentials. Brown was, in fact, not even a lawyer, and had been misrepresenting himself.

== Boy City Film Company ==
Building a national reputation, in the 1910s he started "Boy Cities" in Charlevoix, Michigan, and Gary, Indiana, then relocated to Southern California. (The better-known Boys Town, Nebraska was founded in December 1917.)

By 1917 Brown founded the Boy City Film Company in Culver City, part film studio, part homeless shelter. He served as a film producer.

In film history, Brown is remarkable for giving director King Vidor his first directing job. Brown funded a series of twenty-two reelers, both moral lessons and promotional films. Brown appeared as himself in all but the first one; Vidor directed at least ten of them. These films have evidence of "fascinating social content" - the plot of the second entry, The Chocolate of the Gang, deals with a black child being denied membership in an all-white club, and employed black actors for the lead roles as opposed to the usual practice of white performers in blackface.

Willis Brown, former judge of the Salt Lake City Juvenile Court, died in his home of a heart attack. Brown, 53 years old is survived by a widow and three children.

== Film series ==
- The Boy City (1910) (it) (fr)
- Bud's Recruit (1918)
- The Chocolate of the Gang (1918)
- The Lost Lie (1918)
- Tad's Swimming Hole (1918)
- Marrying Off Dad (1918)
- The Accusing Toe (1918)
- Thief or Angel (1918)
- The Rebellion (1918)
- The Preacher's Son (1918)
- A Boy Built City (1918)
- I'm a Man (1918)
- Love of Bob (1918)
- Dog vs. Dog (1918)
- The Three Fives (1918)
- The Case of Bennie (1918)
- Kid Politics (1918)
- The Demand of Dugan (1919)
- Shift the Gear, Freck (1919)
- Gum Drops and Overalls (1919)
- Danny Asks Why (1919)
