= Love Watches =

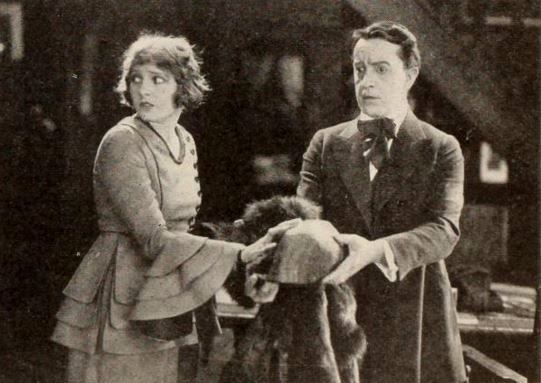
- Still with Griffith and Vane
- Directed by: Henry Houry
- Written by: Graham Baker
- Based on: L'amour veille by Gaston Arman de Caillavet and Robert de Flers
- Produced by: Albert E. Smith
- Starring: Corinne Griffith
- Cinematography: Arthur Ross
- Distributed by: Vitagraph Company of America
- Release date: July 15, 1918
- Running time: 5 reels
- Country: United States
- Language: Silent (English intertitles)

Love Watches is a lost 1918 American silent feature comedy-drama film directed by Henry Houry and starring Corinne Griffith. It was produced and distributed by the Vitagraph Company of America. A Broadway play produced by Charles Frohman starred Billie Burke in 1908.

== Plot ==
As described in a film magazine, although her aunt had planned that Jacqueline Cartaret would marry the bookworm Ernest Augarde, Jacqueline loves Andre de Juvigny and they are eventually married. But Andre previously had a flirtation with Lucia de Morfontaine, and when Jacqueline hears of this she makes Andre promise never to see Lucia again. When Lucia calls on Andre when Jacqueline is out, Jacqueline, angered, decides to pay him back and starts a flirtation with Ernest, which arouses the jealousy of his lady secretary. However, Andre is confident of Jacqueline's consistency, and when Ernest learns that the woman he loved has used him as a dupe, he readily turns to his secretary for consolation.

== Cast ==
- Corinne Griffith as Jacqueline Cartaret
- Denton Vane as Ernest Augarde
- Florence Deshon as Lucia de Morfontaine
- Edmund Burns as Count Andre de Juvigny
- Julia Swayne Gordon as Marquise de Javigny
- Alice Terry as Charlotte Bernier
- Nellie Parker Spaulding as Sophie
- Charles A. Stevenson as Cartaret
- Carola Carson as Baroness
- Alice Nash as Christine
- Edna Nash as Solange
