= Henry Houry =

French actor and director (1874–1972)

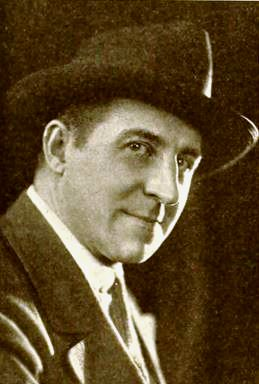
- Houry in 1919 when he was working in America
- Born: Henry Émile Houry; 2 July 1874; Paris, France
- Died: 13 March 1972 (aged 97); Nice, Alpes-Maritimes, France
- Occupation: Actor
- Years active: 1909–1963 (film)

Henry Houry (1874–1972) was a French stage actor. He also appeared in and directed films. He worked for a while in the United States during the silent era, directing the 1918 Corinne Griffith film Love Watches.

== Selected filmography ==
- Love Watches (1918)
- Miss Ambition (1918)
- Koenigsmark (1923)
- Heart of an Actress (1924)
- Azaïs (1931)
- The House of Mystery (1933)
- The Crime of Bouif (1933)
- The Alibi (1937)
- The Woman Who Dared (1944)
- Dominique (1950)
- The Convict (1951)

== Bibliography ==
- Waldman, Harry & Slide, Anthony. Hollywood and the Foreign Touch: A Dictionary of Foreign Filmmakers and Their Films from America, 1910-1995. Scarecrow Press, 1996.
