= Tad's Swimming Hole =

1918 film directed by King Vidor

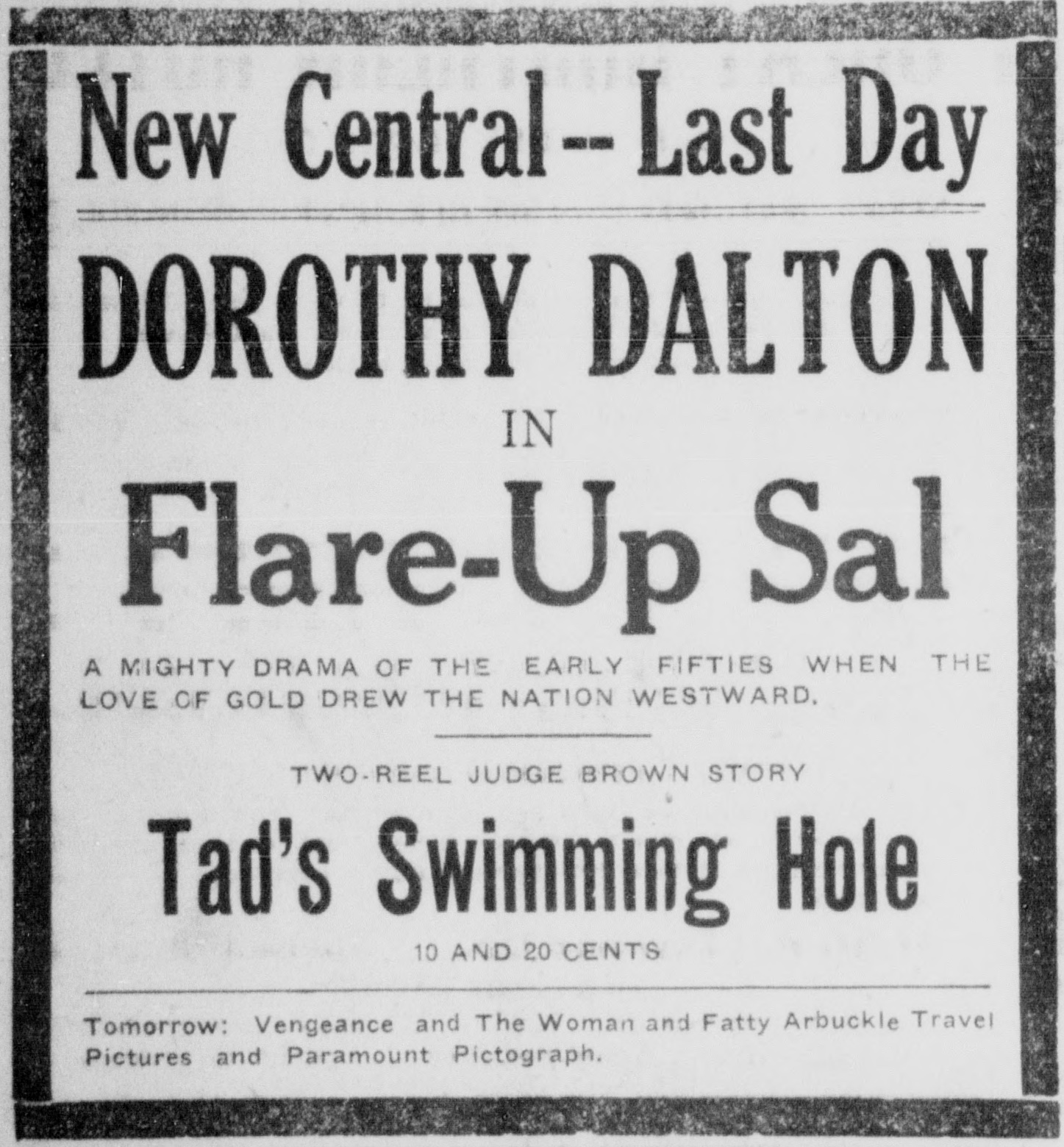
- Contemporary advertisement for the films Flare-Up Sal and Tad's Swimming Hole
- Directed by: King Vidor
- Written by: Judge Willis Brown
- Produced by: Judge Willis Brown
- Starring: Ernest Butterworth
- Production company: Boy City Film
- Distributed by: General Film Company
- Release date: February 20, 1918
- Country: United States
- Language: Silent (English intertitles)

Tad's Swimming Hole is a 1918 American silent short comedy film directed by King Vidor. It was the fourth of a series of twenty films funded by Judge Willis Brown as both moral lessons and promotional films.

== Cast ==
- Ernest Butterworth
- Ruth Hampton
- Guy Hayman
- Ernest Butterworth Jr.
- Thomas Bellamy

== Reception ==
Like many American films of the time, Tad's Swimming Hole was subject to cuts by city and state film censorship boards. For example, the Chicago Board of Censors cut all closeups of naked boys facing the camera.
