= The Accusing Toe =

1918 film directed by King Vidor

- Directed by: King Vidor
- Written by: Judge Willis Brown
- Produced by: Judge Willis Brown
- Starring: Sadie Clayton
- Release date: March 18, 1918
- Country: United States
- Languages: Silent; English intertitles

The Accusing Toe is a 1918 American short comedy film directed by King Vidor.

== Cast ==
- Sadie Clayton
- Dale Faith
- Wharton Jones
