= Back to the Woods (1918 film) =

1918 American silent comedy film

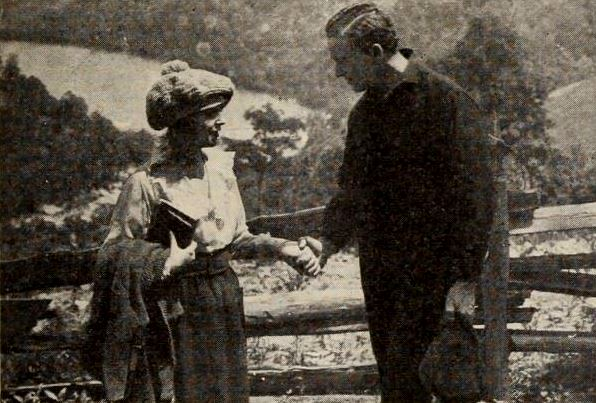
- Directed by: George Irving
- Written by: J. Clarkson Miller
- Starring: Mabel Normand; Herbert Rawlinson; T. Henderson Murray
- Cinematography: J.C. Bitzer
- Production company: Goldwyn Pictures
- Distributed by: Goldwyn Distributing
- Release date: July 28, 1918
- Running time: 50 minutes
- Country: United States
- Languages: Silent; English intertitles

Back to the Woods is a 1918 American silent comedy film directed by George Irving and starring Mabel Normand, Herbert Rawlinson and T. Henderson Murray. The film's sets were designed by the art director Hugo Ballin.

== Cast ==
- Mabel Normand as Stephanie Trent
- Herbert Rawlinson as Jimmy Raymond
- T. Henderson Murray as Stephen J. Trent
- Arthur Housman as Bill Andrews
- James Laffey

== Preservation ==
With no holdings located in archives, Back to the Woods is considered a lost film.

== Bibliography ==
- Betty Harper Fussell. Mabel. Limelight Editions, 1992.
