= James McLaughlin (actor) =

American film actor and director

James McLaughlin, (a.k.a. James W. MacLaughlin and J.W. McLaughlin) was an American film actor and director.

== Filmography ==
=== Actor ===
- The Girl from the East as Jim Brandon (1915)
- The Scrub as Dick Blackwood (1915)
- The Vagabond Prince as "Red" Kelly (1916)
- The Tar Heel Warrior as James Adams (1917)
- God's Gold as Corwin Carson (1921)
- Black Sheep as José (1921)
- Reputation as a Heavy man (stage sequence) (1921)
- South of Northern Lights as Caporal McAllister (1922)
- The Fighting Strain as Herbert Canfield (1923)
- Three Pals Wingate's Secretary (1926)

=== Director ===
- Beyond the Shadows (1918)
- Hell's End (1918)
- Closin' In (1918)
- The Man Who Woke Up (1918)
