= America's Answer =

1918 film

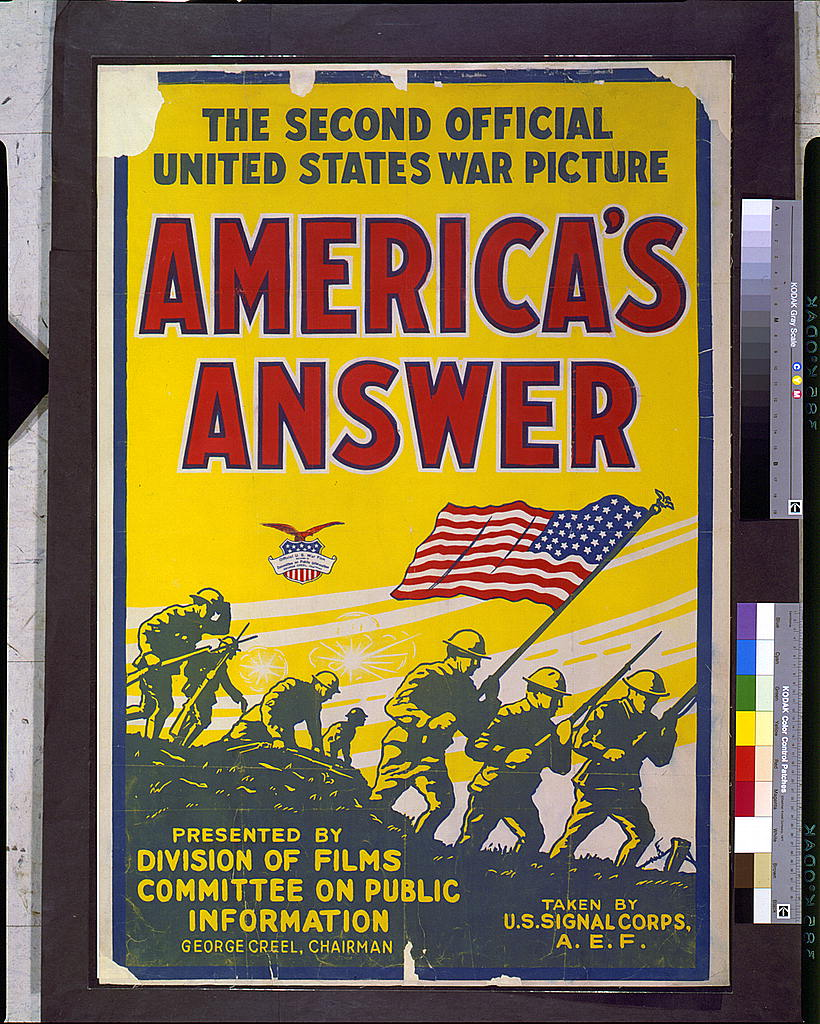
- Theatrical release poster
- Directed by: Edwin F. Glenn
- Produced by: Charles S. Hart
- Cinematography: Freeman H. Owens
- Music by: none (silent film)
- Release date: 14 July 1918
- Running time: 80 minutes
- Country: United States
- Language: English
- Box office: $185,144

America's Answer is a 1918 American documentary and war silent film directed by Edwin F. Glenn. It chronicles the arrival of the first half-million American troops in France during World War I.
