= The Man Who Woke Up (1918 film) =

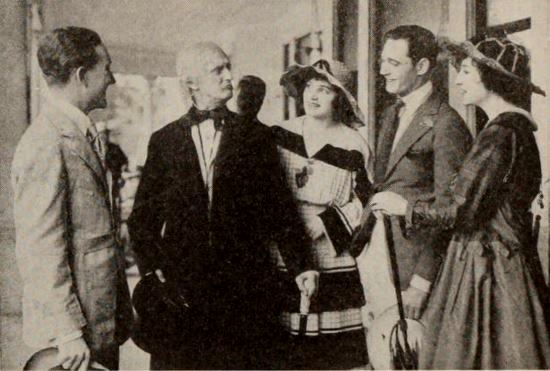
- Still from The Man Who Woke Up on June 29, 1918 Exhibitors Herald.
- Directed by: James McLaughlin (as J.W. McLaughlin)
- Written by: William V. Mong (scenario)
- Starring: William V. Mong; Pauline Starke; George Hernandez
- Cinematography: Stephen S. Norton (as Steve S. Norton)
- Distributed by: Triangle Distributing
- Release date: June 2, 1918
- Country: United States
- Languages: Silent; English intertitles

The Man Who Woke Up is a lost 1918 American silent film drama directed by James McLaughlin and featuring William V. Mong.

== Cast ==
- William V. Mong as William Oglesby
- Pauline Starke as Edith Oglesby
- George Hernandez as Thomas Foster
- Estelle Evans as Sylvia Oglesby
- Darrell Foss as Foster's Son
- Harry Depp as G. Waldo Campbell
- George C. Pearce as Judge Campbell (as George Pearce)
- Jean Calhoun as Dorothy Foster
- Jim Blackwell On Hand (as J. Blackwell)
- Alberta Lee as Undetermined Role
