= Bud's Recruit =

1918 film directed by King Vidor

- Directed by: King Vidor
- Written by: Judge Willis Brown; King Vidor
- Produced by: Judge Willis Brown
- Starring: Wallace Brennan
- Distributed by: General Film Company
- Release date: January 19, 1918
- Running time: 26 minutes
- Country: United States
- Languages: Silent; English intertitles

Bud's Recruit is a 1918 American silent short comedy film directed by King Vidor. A print survives at the UCLA Film & Television Archive. In February 2020, the film was shown at the 70th Berlin International Film Festival, as part of a retrospective dedicated to King Vidor's career.

== Cast ==
- Wallace Brennan as Bud Gilbert
- Robert Gordon as Reggie Gilbert
- Ruth Hampton as Edith
- Mildred Davis as Edith's sister

== Production ==
Bud’s Recruit is one of ten short films written and produced by Judge Willis Brown that were directed by King Vidor. These were filmed at Boy City Film Company in Culver City, California and released by General Film Company between January and May 1918. Bud’s Recruit is unique in that it is the only film from the Judge Willis Brown series that survives. This film is the only one of the series in which Judge Willis Brown did not appear.

== Theme ==
Brown was a Salt Lake City juvenile court judge who specialized in “rehabilitating juvenile offenders.” He based the series on his experiences operating his “Boy’s Cities” (not to be confused with Boys Town). The movies depict “inter-ethnic” city youth facing and resolving social and moral challenges constructively. Written and filmed shortly after the United States entered WWI in 1917, the Bud’s Recruit alludes to the isolationist impulses that affected recruitment efforts. The movie is pro-intervention, though Vidor presents a tough-in-check portrayal of the under-age brother (Bud) pro-enlistment enthusiasm. His chastening ultimately served to overcome his mother’s and older brothers’ resistance to supporting the war effort. His older brother (Reggie) is “Bud’s Recruit”.
