= Charles Meredith (actor) =

American actor (1894–1964)

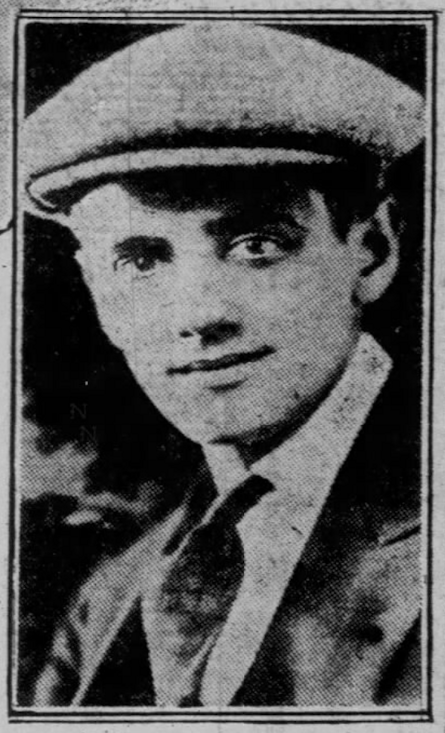
- Meredith in That Something (1920)
- Born: Charles Howard Meredith; August 27, 1894; Knoxville, Pennsylvania, U.S.
- Died: November 28, 1964 (aged 70); Woodland Hills, California, U.S.
- Education: Carnegie Institute of Technology
- Occupations: Actor, director
- Years active: 1913–1964
- Spouses: Melba Dorothy Melsing (m. 1920; div. 1927); Jewel Hummel Bolton (m. 1928; div. 1930); Margaret Muse (m. 1932)
- Children: 3

Charles Meredith (August 27, 1894 – November 28, 1964) was an American stage, film, and television actor, who also directed plays and taught in college drama departments. His screen career came in two widely separated phases: as a leading man for silent films in the early 1920s, and as a character actor for films and television from 1947 through 1964. He was a series regular on television shows Rocky Jones, Space Ranger and The Court of Last Resort.

== Early life ==
Charles Howard Meredith was born in Knoxville, (Note: This is not the Knoxville, Pennsylvania in Tioga County.) a suburb of Pittsburgh, Pennsylvania. He was the second of four children for Benjamin Franklin Meredith, a school teacher, and his wife Rosabel Fleming, a daughter of English immigrants. As a child he attended Belleville School in Oakland, Pittsburgh through the eighth grade, then Pittsburgh High School where he ran track and graduated from the academic curriculum during June 1912.

== College and early stage career ==
Meredith attended the Carnegie Institute of Technology, where he was a student in the Drama department for the School of Applied Design. At the start of his first year he was in a professional production of Salvation Nell at the Pitt Theater in Pittsburgh, his first known stage credit. While at Carnegie, Meredith was active in performing student productions. He also acted as assistant to the department head in staging both college plays and outside special events. According to his 1964 obituary notice in The New York Times and to columnist Kaspar Monahan in The Pittsburgh Press, Meredith earned an M.A. degree at Carnegie. (Note: While Meredith's activities at Carnegie are well documented in local newspapers for the years 1914-1916, his name is not in any of the graduate lists published each June. A 1919 Pittsburgh newspaper account after his first motion pictures reached that city mentions he spent three years at Carnegie, but says nothing about a degree.)

After college, Meredith joined the road company for the Washington Square Players (WSP), performing its repertory of one-act plays alongside Sam Jaffe and Ralph Roeder. He then had a major role in a two-act play, Plots and Playwrights, staged by the WSP at the Comedy Theatre, which also featured Katharine Cornell and Helen Westley. Meredith returned to Pittsburgh for a play in October 1917, but went back to New York in early 1918 for a series of short-lived Broadway productions. First up was the debut of "an odd new comedy" called April by Hubert Osborne, followed by Her Honor, the Mayor, and in June 1918, The Best Sellers, which amused Heywood Broun in his review. Meredith's final Broadway play for seven years came in August 1918, with Allegiance.

== West Coast and silent films ==
=== Morosco Players ===
Meredith left New York in November 1918 to join the Morosco Players in Los Angeles as their new leading man. (Note: Their previous leading man, Charles Gunn, was leaving to fulfill a movie contract but soon died in the Spanish flu pandemic.) He received acclaim from the Los Angeles Times for stepping into the lead role of Pals First with just two days notice. By May 1919 he had performed the male lead in seven productions at the Morosco Theatre when he was signed by King Vidor to support his wife Florence Vidor in films.

=== King Vidor films ===
The Other Half was third of a series of Christian Science-themed films King Vidor made for Brentwood Film Corporation. Meredith's parents had been Christian Science practitioners; whether that played any role in his casting is unknown. The Los Angeles Times said the four principals, Florence Vidor, Meredith, ZaSu Pitts, and David Butler, would play characters representing "the Classes" and "the Masses". Filming completed in July 1919, even as Sheldon Johnson was working on the scenario for the next Vidor-Brentwood collaboration.

In between filmings, Meredith decided to join another stage company, taking part in one-act plays with Neely Dickson's Hollywood Community Theater.

The Other Half was in Eastern cinema houses by September, and in Los Angeles by October. For both coasts, the female leads drew the attention of reviewers, in part because the film publicity emphasized them. However, the Los Angeles Times reviewer acknowledged Meredith's "dramatic excellence" in an ill-defined role. Meredith's second Vidor film Poor Relations was released in November 1919. Pittsburgh newspapers recognized him as a hometown boy and reported on his career.

The Family Honor, released in March 1920, was Meredith's last film for King Vidor, though he would later make other pictures with Florence Vidor. It was made by Vidor's own production company in conjunction with First National Film Distributors,. Two Los Angeles reviewers were mildly critical of Meredith's character, reporting that it wasn't quite convincing, though well-acted.

=== Famous Players–Lasky ===
Meredith had signed in June 1919 to support Marguerite Clark, then working with Famous Players–Lasky, after his Brentwood film commitment was finished. While discussing his performances with the Hollywood Community Theatre in early October, a newspaper mentioned Meredith was "now playing leads at the Lasky studio". Meredith's first picture at Lasky, Luck in Pawn, was released in November 1919. His second Lasky film, in support of Ethel Clayton, was The Thirteenth Commandment, released in January 1920. As with his previous films, though Meredith was the leading man, he still took a distant second place to the female star in terms of billing and publicity.

His third Lasky film was Judy of Rogue's Harbor, for which he supported Mary Miles Minter in a pot-boiler involving kidnapped children, a stolen fortune and bomb-throwing anarchists. The Ladder of Lies starred Ethel Clayton as Edith Parrish, a magazine illustrator whose publisher friend marries an "unworthy" wife. Meredith is the leading man, Blaine, whom Parrish really loves.

A Romantic Adventuress, produced by Adolph Zukor for Lasky, was a twist on the usual storyline for these fantasies. While heroine Dorothy Dalton is supposed to be a professional dancer being exploited by her mother, Meredith's leading man is athletic and gallant, but he's also an engineer with little money. The heroine rejects the temptations of ill-gotten gains from her roguish mother and settles for taking a chance on life with her young man. Reviewers were not impressed with Dalton's attempt at interpretive dancing, nor with the pace of the movie.

In Beyond, adapted from the stage play Lift the Veil, Meredith played opposite Ethel Clayton once more. Directed by William Desmond Taylor for Lasky, the New York Tribune reviewer said: "Miss Clayton, as Avis, did good work, as did, also, Charles Meredith, as the husband. The rest of the cast ranged from fair to terrible." Clayton and Meredith were reunited again in The Cradle, completed at the Lasky studio during October 1921.

=== Independent player ===
Though he worked for Vidor and Lasky in his first films, Meredith wasn't bound to an exclusive contract like later leading players under the studio system. The Herman Film Corporation, based in Santa Monica, hired Meredith and Margery Wilson for That Something, from a novel by W. W. Woodbridge. The picture was completed by November 1919, and given a preview showing a month later, but wasn't in general release until May 1920. It was the first picture in which Meredith received equal billing with the female star. It was also his first movie in which the focus was on the male character: his downfall from a wealthy upbringing to being a derelict, his reformation through suffering, and his rise back through self-reliance and hard work. The movie was financially backed by the Rotary Club of Los Angeles, to raise funds for its community Settlement House.

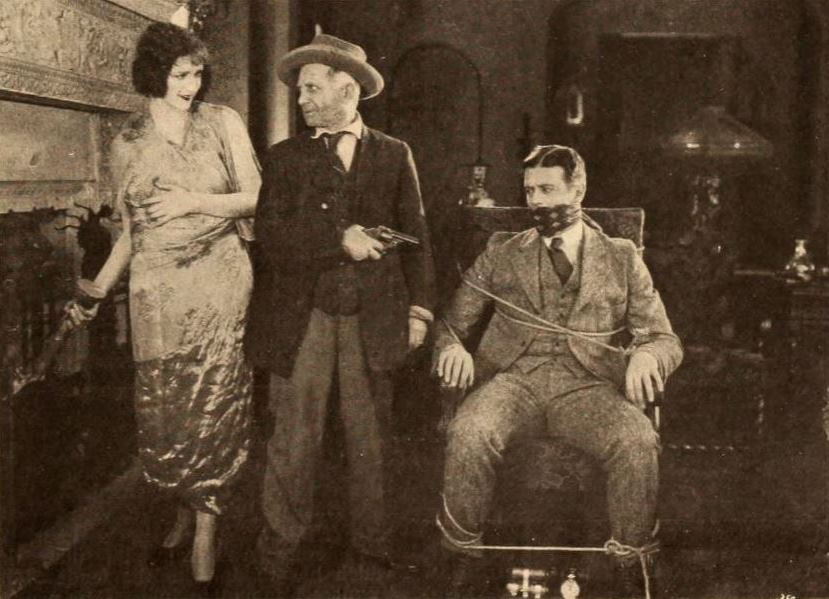
The Perfect Woman

Simple Souls starred Blanche Sweet with Meredith as the leading man. Produced by Jesse D. Hampton, it was a fairy tale of "a little shopgirl who marries a duke". Meredith's duke was also a "simple soul", an amateur biologist who naively gives the little shopgirl money to buy books, they being her refuge from drudgery. Another fairy tale of a story was The Perfect Woman, which starred Constance Talmadge and was produced by Joseph M. Schenck for First National Film Distributors. Meredith's character believes he's a woman-hater, until he is rescued by Talmadge from anarchists. The Little 'Fraid Lady, starring Mae Marsh, was a production of the independent Robertson-Cole Pictures Corporation. Marsh played an artist who has isolated herself in the woods through distrust of people; Meredith is the man who reaches through her suspicion.

The Foolish Matrons produced and directed by Maurice Tourneur, was an ensemble film with six lead players, including Meredith. Three interrelated stories, each with its own married couple, make up the plot. During September 1921 Meredith made Hail the Woman with Florence Vidor and Madge Bellamy at the Thomas H. Ince studio.

== Sabbatical and stage return ==
At the end of November 1921, with his film career still going strong, Meredith took a year off to study in Europe. Three films he had already completed, The Beautiful Liar, The Cradle, and Woman, Wake Up were released after he had sailed. The year turned into almost two before he returned to Hollywood. He told an interviewer in 1929: "I was a preposterously high paid leading man in pictures... that's how I got the money to go to Europe". Upon returning, he labelled it a "sabbatical", and insisted that actors as well as academics need time off to broaden their knowledge. Meredith said he had studied new cinema and stage developments in Europe. However, his film career in Hollywood had lost its momentum; he had only one more screen role, a small supporting part in In Hollywood with Potash and Perlmutter (1924), before returning to the stage for over twenty years.

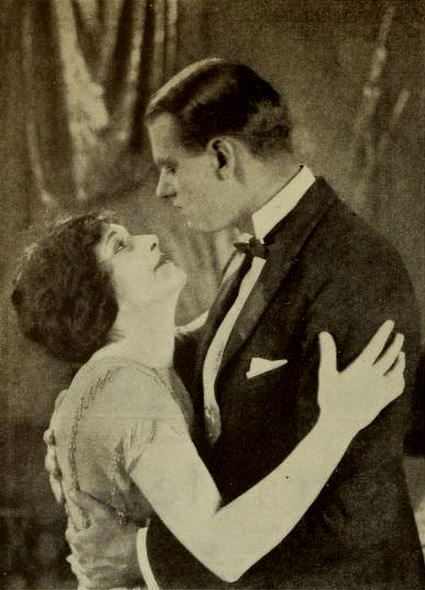
With Anna Lehr in The Cradle (1922)

Meredith's final Broadway performance came in March 1925, when he played Doris Keane's lover in Starlight, "a comedy in ten scenes and an epilogue". The play ran thru May 2, 1925 for some 71 performances. He spent the next two years performing in repertory and road companies for plays such as Quarantine and The Comedienne. Thereafter Meredith's stage work would mostly be as director for community and Little Theatre, starting at the Lobero Theatre in Santa Barbara, California in November 1927.

== Stage direction and academic work ==
Meredith officially replaced Irving Pichel as director for the Santa Barbara Community Arts players during January 1928. He held the position until August 1929, when he resigned in a dispute over whether the Community Arts group should open a drama school and mount amateur productions.

From 1931 Meredith was the director for the Dallas Little Theater. For 1937-1938 he was also head of the Speech and Drama department at the Hockaday School. Meredith resigned the Dallas positions in July 1938 to take up managing and directing at the Dock Street Theatre in Charleston, South Carolina. He was elected president of the Confederacy of American Community Theaters during May 1939. Meredith remained with the Dock Street Theatre through 1942, when he took a visiting summer faculty position at the University of Michigan.

Meredith then went to Le Petit Theatre du Vieux Carre in New Orleans as director. While there he received a grant from the Rockefeller Foundation to conduct a survey on independent theatres in America.

== Return to screen acting ==
Meredith returned to Los Angeles and film work in May 1947 with a role in Dream Girl. Edwin Schallert of the Los Angeles Times, who first covered Meredith in 1919, called him "one of the kingpin leading men of the silent screen" and made much of his return to films after twenty years. By the start of 1950 Meredith had done small parts in 19 films, albeit many of them uncredited. The pace of his film work slowed as he branched out into television, where his parts were bigger, but he still performed in 51 more films between 1950 and 1964.

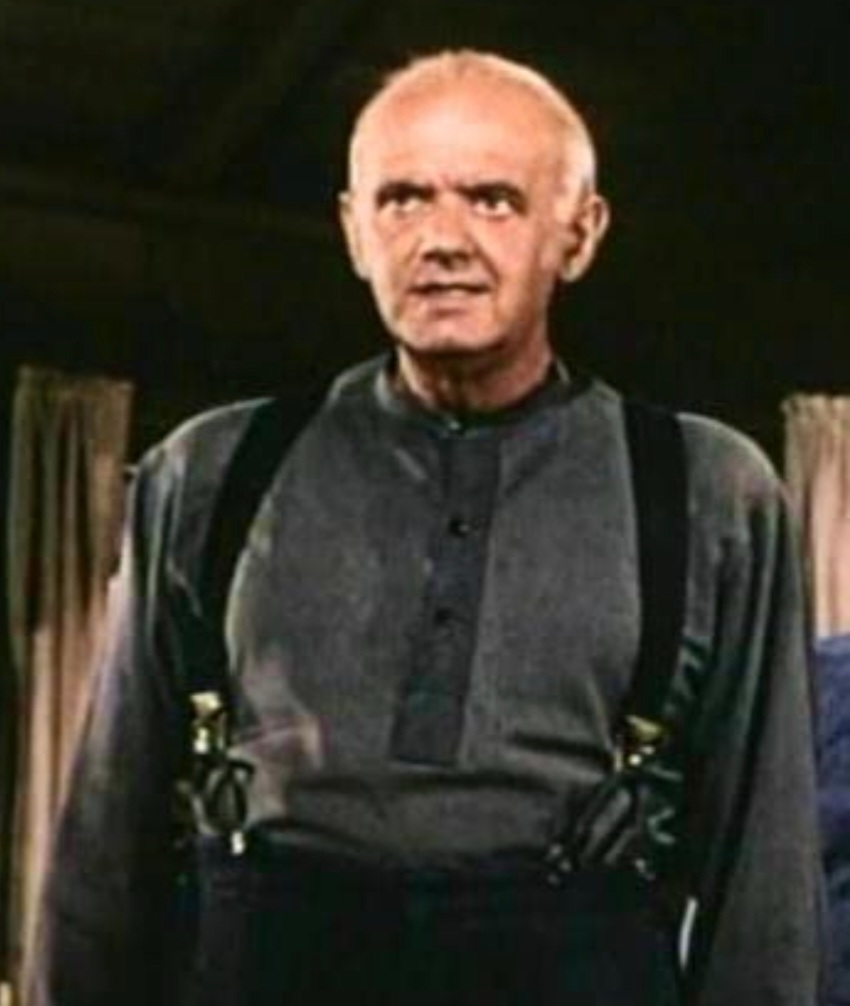
Meredith in The Big Trees (1952)

== Television ==
An anthology series was Meredith's first credit on television, with an episode of The Magnavox Theatre in 1950. The following year he did another anthology show, Family Theater, and a narrative series Racket Squad. For the next twelve years he would appear on fifty more television shows, some for multiple episodes, before his final appearance on that medium in 1963 with Petticoat Junction.

=== Series regular ===
Meredith was twice cast as a series regular on television shows. The first was Rocky Jones, Space Ranger, a filmed syndicated children's series that first aired in February 1954. He played Secretary Drake, a government official who was a father-figure to the lead character, Rocky Jones (Richard Crane). His second stint as a series regular was for a network series The Court of Last Resort, a weekly dramatised courtroom show that began in October 1957. Meredith played Dr. LeMoyne Snyder in this series that re-examined real cases where the convicted was felt to be innocent. The show lasted until April 1958 on NBC, but was later rebroadcast on ABC during 1959–1960.

== Later years ==
Meredith continued performing in films right up to the last year of his life, when four movies he had made were released: The Incredible Mr. Limpet, Seven Days in May, Dead Ringer, and The Quick Gun. On September 30, 1964, he was admitted to the Motion Picture Country Home in Woodland Hills, California, where two months later he died on November 28, 1964.

== Personal life ==
Meredith stated on registering for the draft in June 1917 that he was married. The registrar also recorded "Claims both ankles broken playing football", along with supporting a wife, as mitigating factors for Meredith being drafted. According to a 1923 passport application, Meredith at age 29 stood 6 ft 2 in (188 cm) with brown hair and blue eyes. He didn't drink alcohol, but was fond of buttermilk.

Meredith was at a party given by Alexander Pantages in September 1919 where Melba Melsing entertained by singing and playing the piano. By February 1920 Meredith was boarding with the Melsing family in Los Angeles. Melba Melsing and Meredith were married March 10, 1920, at the Mission Inn in Riverside, California. While on a working tour in Europe, their daughter was born in Berlin, Germany during December 1922. After their return to the United States, a son was born in Los Angeles in November 1924.

While director of the Santa Barbara Community Arts Theater, Meredith married Jewel Hummel Bolton on November 27, 1928. They met at rehearsals for The Swan, in which she played a princess and Meredith directed.

During Meredith's tenure as director for the Dallas Little Theater, he met and married an aspiring actress named Margaret Muse. They had one son, born during October 1933. The couple remained married until Meredith's death in 1964.

== Stage performances ==
Listed by year of first performance, excluding student productions and director credits.

| Year | Play | Role | Venue | Notes |
|---|---|---|---|---|
| 1913 | Salvation Nell | Dr. Benedict | Pitt Theatre | Meredith's first known professional stage credit. |
| 1917 | Plots and Playwrights | Tom Burch | Comedy Theatre | An original two-act play by Edward Massey, it ran for two months on Broadway. |
| 1917 | Baa, Baa, Blacksheep | | Duquesne Theatre | An original play by Frederick J. Jackson, |
| 1918 | April | | Punch & Judy Theatre | Debut comedy by Hubert Osborne, ran for a month. |
| 1918 | Her Honor, the Mayor | Buddy Martin | Fulton Theatre | By Arline Van Ness Hines, produced by the Actors' and Authors' Theatre, Inc. |
| 1918 | The Best Sellers | Balkan Prince | Fulton Theatre | One-act play with three scenes by Kenneth Webb and Roy Webb. |
| 1918 | Allegiance | Max Hartmann | Maxine Elliott's Theatre | Topical play about the loyalties of a hyphenated American family. |
| 1918 | Pals First | Danny Rowland | Morosco Theatre | Meredith had only two rehearsals before replacing the ailing Charles Gunn. |
| 1918 | Nothing But the Truth | Bob Bennett | Morosco Theatre | |
| 1918 | Sick-a-Bed | Reginald Jay | Morosco Theatre | |
| 1919 | A Stitch in Time | Worthing Bryce | Morosco Theatre | |
| 1919 | Yes or No | Tom Martin | Morosco Theatre | Three-act play by Arthur Goodrich with a bisected stage on which parallel domestic stories unfold. |
| 1919 | The Walkoffs | Robert Shirley Winston | Morosco Theatre | Meredith plays a backwoods scion adrift among the urban intelligentsia. |
| 1919 | Daddy Long-Legs | Daddy Long-Legs | Morosco Theatre | |
| 1919 | Eyes of Youth | | Morosco Theatre | Meredith played one of three suitors to the female lead. |
| 1919 | The Lady with a Dagger | | Hollywood Community Theatre | One-act tragedy by Arthur Schnitzler starred Meredith and Helen Jerome Eddy. |
| 1919 | The Pot Boiler | | Hollywood Community Theatre | One-act comedy on a playwright's characters rewriting themselves. |
| 1919 | He Said and She Said | | Hollywood Community Theatre | One-act comedy of gossip by Alice Gerstenberg. |
| 1919 | The Bear | Grigory Smirnov | Hollywood Community Theatre | Anton Chekhov's one-act comedy also starred Glory Raye and Antrim Short. |
| 1925 | Starlight | Lucien | Broadhurst Theatre; Wallack's Theatre | Meredith's last Broadway stage credit. |
| 1925 | Quarantine | | Repertory Company | Meredith and Isabel Randolph are supposed newlyweds confined together by a public health order. |
| 1925 | The Boomerang | Dr. Sumner | Repertory Company | The Woodward Players, with Meredith and Isabel Randolph as leads, also included Jane Darwell. |
| 1925 | Upstairs and Down | Capt. Terrence O'Keefe | Repertory Company | Comedy by Frederick and Fanny Hatton. |
| 1927 | The Comedienne | Herbert Risbee | Touring company | Meredith played a ham actor opposite Laurette Taylor in a play by J. Hartley Manners. |
| 1929 | The Youngest | | Vine Street Theater | Douglas Fairbanks Jr. starred in this Philip Barry comedy. |
| 1929 | What a Woman Wants | Mr. East | Vine Street Theater | Marjorie Rambeau starred. |
| 1929 | Merely Mary Ann | | Vine Street Theater | Another Marjorie Rambeau vehicle, with Meredith again the male lead. |

== Partial filmography ==
- The Other Half (1919) - Donald Trent
- Poor Relations (1919) - Monty Rhodes
- Luck in Pawn (1919) - Richard Standish Norton
- The Thirteenth Commandment (1920) - Clay Wimborn
- Judy of Rogue's Harbor (1920) - Lieutenant Teddy Kingsland
- The Family Honor (1920) - Merle Curran
- That Something (1920) - Edwin Drake
- Simple Souls (1920) - Duke of Wynninghame
- The Ladder of Lies (1920) - John Blaine
- The Perfect Woman (1920) - James Stanhope
- A Romantic Adventuress (1920) - Captain Maxwell
- The Little 'Fraid Lady (1920) - Saxton Graves
- The Foolish Matrons (1921) - Lafayette Wayne
- Beyond (1921) - Geoffrey Southerne
- The Cave Girl (1921) - Divvy Bates
- Hail the Woman (1921) - Richard Stuart
- The Beautiful Liar (1921) - Bobby Bates
- The Cradle (1922) - Dr. Robert Harvey
- Woman, Wake Up (1922) - Henry Mortimer
- In Hollywood with Potash and Perlmutter (1924) - Sam Pemberton
- Daisy Kenyon (1947) - Judge (uncredited)
- The Miracle of the Bells (1948) - Father Spinsky
- All My Sons (1948) - Ellsworth (uncredited)
- Homecoming (1948) - Major on Return Transport Ship (uncredited)
- Dream Girl (1948) - Charles
- A Foreign Affair (1948) - Congressman Yandell
- They Live by Night (1948) - Commander Hubbell
- For the Love of Mary (1948) - Justice Hastings
- The Boy with Green Hair (1948) - Mr. Piper
- He Walked by Night (1948) - Hollywood Police Official (uncredited)
- The Lucky Stiff (1949) - Jim Childers a.k.a. Big Jim
- Tulsa (1949) - Ned, Governor of Oklahoma (uncredited)
- Streets of San Francisco (1949) - James T. Eckert, Chief of Police
- Tokyo Joe (1949) - General Ireton
- Always Leave Them Laughing (1949) - Dr. Finley (uncredited)
- The Lady Takes a Sailor (1949) - Dr. Rufus McKewen (uncredited)
- Samson and Delilah (1949) - High Priest of Dagon (uncredited)
- Malaya (1949) - Big Man (uncredited)
- Francis (1950) - Banker Munroe
- Perfect Strangers (1950) - Lyle Pettijohn
- Caged (1950) - Parole Board Chairman (uncredited)
- Bright Leaf (1950) - Pendleton (uncredited)
- Kiss Tomorrow Goodbye (1950) - Fred Golightly, Attorney (uncredited)
- The Sun Sets at Dawn (1950) - Reporter, AP
- Counterspy Meets Scotland Yard (1950) - Miller
- Al Jennings of Oklahoma (1951) - Judge Evans
- The Great Missouri Raid (1951) - Member Bankers Association (uncredited)
- Santa Fe (1951) - Official in Santa Fe (uncredited)
- Along the Great Divide (1951) - Judge Marlowe
- Dear Brat (1951) - Speaker (uncredited)
- Strangers on a Train (1951) - Judge Donahue (uncredited)
- Fort Worth (1951) - Sam, Railroad Backer (uncredited)
- Close to My Heart (1951) - Dr. George E. Williamson (uncredited)
- The Sea Hornet (1951) - Mr. Goodrich (uncredited)
- Submarine Command (1951) - Admiral Tobias
- Room for One More (1952) - Mr. Thatcher (uncredited)
- The Big Trees (1952) - Elder Bixby
- Loan Shark (1952) - F.L. Rennick (uncredited)
- Paula (1952) - Dr. Walter T. Farrell (uncredited)
- Cattle Town (1952) - Texas Governor
- So This Is Love (1953) - Arthur Bodansky (uncredited)
- A Lion Is in the Streets (1953) - Judge (uncredited)
- Them! (1954) - Washington Official (uncredited)
- Rocky Jones, Space Ranger (1954, TV Series, 23 episodes) - Secretary of Space Drake
- New York Confidential (1955) - Congressman (uncredited)
- The Eternal Sea (1955) - Vice Admiral (uncredited)
- City of Shadows (1955) - Judge Fellows (uncredited)
- The Road to Denver (1955) - Lawyer Krump (uncredited)
- Illegal (1955) - Judge (uncredited)
- The Lone Ranger (1956) - Governor
- Miracle in the Rain (1956) - Mr. Baldwin's Associate (uncredited)
- The Birds and the Bees (1956) - Passenger (uncredited)
- Back from Eternity (1956) - Dean Simmons (uncredited)
- Giant (1956) - Minister (uncredited)
- Top Secret Affair (1957) - Charlie (uncredited)
- The Guns of Fort Petticoat (1957) - Commanding Officer (uncredited)
- Beau James (1957) - Judge John Harrison (uncredited)
- Chicago Confidential (1957) - Dr. Charing, Sound Expert (uncredited)
- The Court of Last Resort (1957–1958, TV Series) - Dr. LeMoyne Snyder
- The Buccaneer (1958) - Senior Senator
- Alfred Hitchcock Presents (1959) (Season 4 Episode 25: "The Kind Waitress") - Dr. Lacey
- Twelve Hours to Kill (1960) - Herbst, the Druggist
- Noose for a Gunman (1960) - Minister (uncredited)
- Ocean's Eleven (1960) - Mr. Cohen, Mortician (uncredited)
- Alfred Hitchcock Presents (1961) (Season 6 Episode 17: "The Last Escape") - Reverend
- Alfred Hitchcock Presents (1961) (Season 6 Episode 25: "Museum Piece") - Judge
- A Public Affair (1962) - Senator Lewis (uncredited)
- The Incredible Mr. Limpet (1964) - Fleet Admiral
- Seven Days in May (1964) - Senate Committee Member (uncredited)
- Dead Ringer (1964) - Defense Lawyer (uncredited)
- The Quick Gun (1964) - Reverend Staley (final film role)
