= The Perfect Woman =

The Perfect Woman may refer to:

- The Perfect Woman (1920 film), an American silent comedy starring Constance Talmadge
- The Perfect Woman (1949 film), a British comedy starring Patricia Roc
- La mujer perfecta, a Venezuelan telenovela whose English title is The Perfect Woman
