= The Real Adventure =

1922 film directed by King Vidor

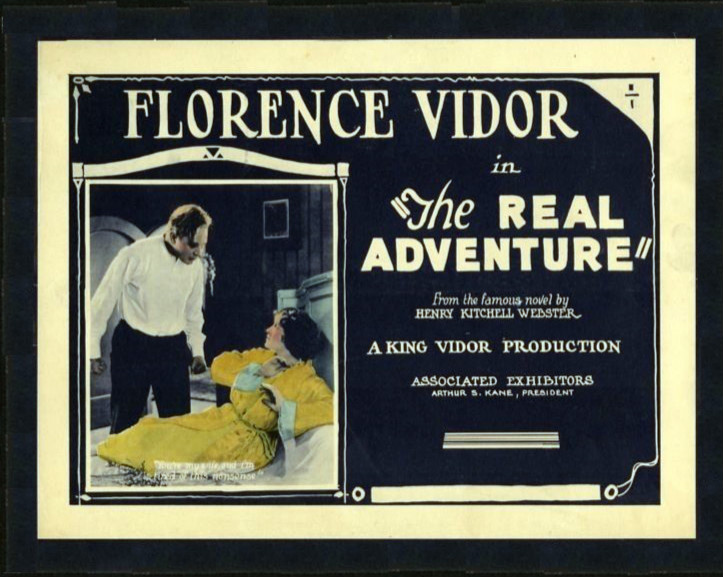
- Film poster
- Directed by: King Vidor
- Written by: Mildred Considine
- Based on: The Real Adventure by Henry Kitchell Webster
- Produced by: King Vidor
- Starring: Florence Vidor
- Cinematography: George Barnes
- Distributed by: Associated Exhibitors
- Release date: May 28, 1922
- Running time: 50 minutes; 5 reels (4,932 feet)
- Country: United States
- Language: Silent (English intertitles)

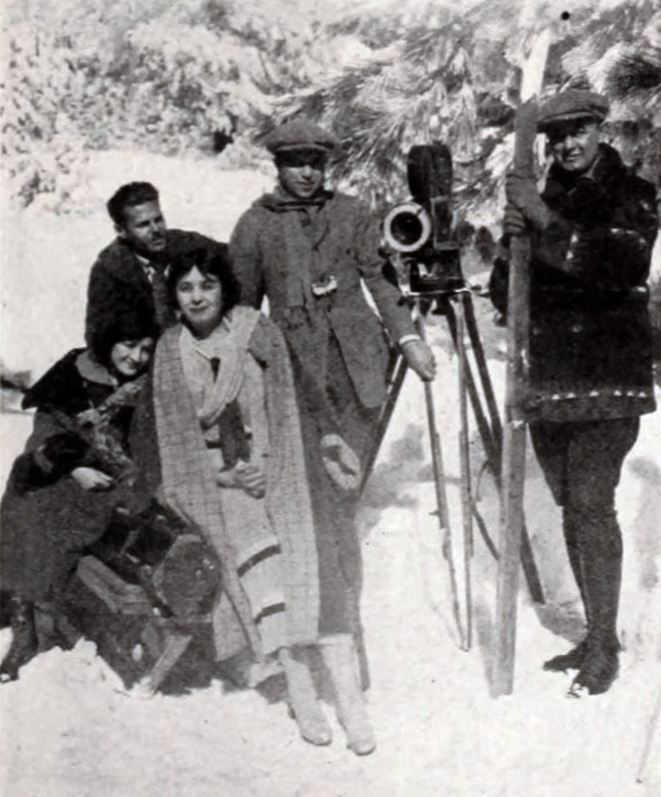
Florence Vidor, director King Vidor, and cinematographer George Barnes, on location in Pinecrest, California

The Real Adventure is a 1922 American silent drama film directed by King Vidor, based on the best-selling novel by Henry Kitchell Webster that was serialized in 1915 and published as a book in 1916. A print of the film is held by the Cinémathèque de Toulous. In February 2020, the film was shown at the 70th Berlin International Film Festival, as part of a retrospective dedicated to King Vidor's career.

== Plot ==
As described in a film magazine, impetuous and headstrong Rose Stanton (Vidor) accidentally meets famous attorney Rodney Aldrich (Fillmore) when a conductor rudely accosts her for her streetcar fare. It is love at first sight and, after a brief courtship, they are married. Rose becomes cross at Rodney while on their honeymoon at his mountain lodge when he studies from a law book for an hour. He saves her after she dashes out into a snow storm. Back home, after her husband ridicules her for attempting to study law, she determines to leave him and, using the name Doris Dane, she becomes famous in New York City as the designer of stage dresses. Her husband follows her to the city and, following a reconciliation, they have a complete understanding. The film ends as a child arrives at the Aldrich residence and the real adventure begins.

== Cast ==
- Florence Vidor as Rose Stanton
- Clyde Fillmore as Rodney Aldrich
- Nellie Peck Saunders as Mrs. Stanton
- Lilyan McCarthy as Portia
- Philip Ryder as John Walbraith

== Theme ==
Film historian John Baxter identifies The Real Adventure (as well as his Woman, Wake Up, also from 1922, as early feminist films: “[Both films] have earned a place in the history of feminist cinema with their picture of a woman struggling to succeed in a male society. In Woman, Wake Up, Florence Vidor becomes involved in society to please her husband and is so successful at it that he becomes jealous, while in The Real Adventure, she is transformed after her marriage to a wealthy husband: she studies law, goes on stage as a chorus girl, designs costumes, opens a salon but realizes home and family must come first”
