= All Wrong =

All Wrong may refer to:

- All Wrong (film), a 1919 American silent comedy film
- "All Wrong" (Below Deck), a 2023 TV episode
- "All Wrong", a song by God Lives Underwater from Empty, 1995
- "All Wrong", a song by the Story So Far from What You Don't See, 2013
