= The Family Honor =

1920 film directed by King Vidor

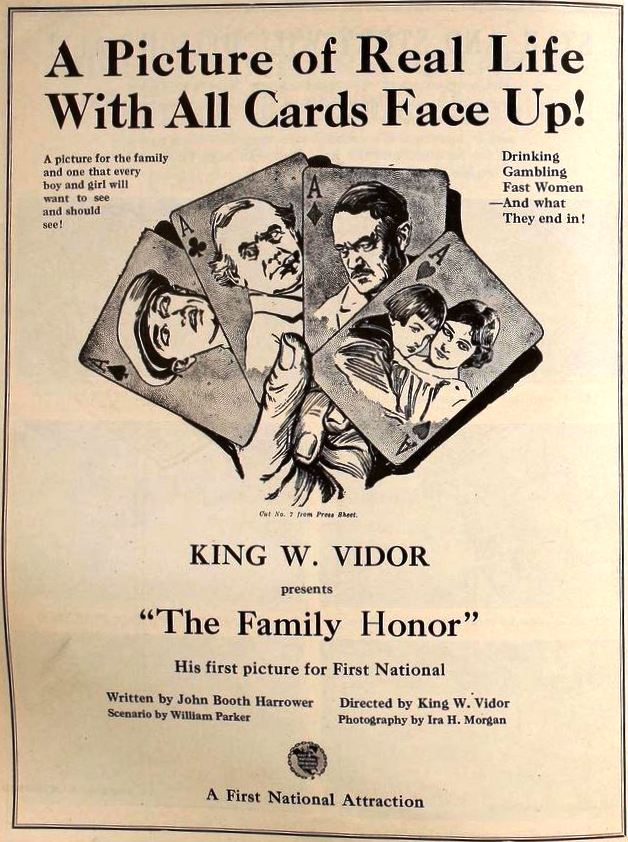
- Advert for film
- Directed by: King Vidor
- Written by: John Booth Harrower; William Parker
- Produced by: King Vidor
- Starring: Florence Vidor
- Cinematography: Ira H. Morgan
- Distributed by: First National Exhibitors' Circuit
- Release date: March 15, 1920
- Running time: 50 minutes
- Country: United States
- Language: Silent (English intertitles)

The Family Honor is a 1920 American silent drama-romance film directed by King Vidor and starring Florence Vidor. A copy of the film is in a French archive.

== Plot ==
As described in a film publication, the proud, Southern, and old Tucker family is now broke and places its hopes on a college youth, Dal, who has a taste for gambling, his sister Beverly, full of hope and trust, and young Ben, a disciple of right thinking. Beverly has put her brother through college only to find out that he has become a first class scamp. To maintain the honor of her name, Beverley's fiance tries to anticipate a raid on a vicious dive in the town that is frequented by Dal. The raid takes place and Dal escapes, only to be later caught and indicted for murder. The evidence is going against Dal until his little brother Ben comes into the courtroom and, with the spirit of truth, testifies such that Dal is freed.

== Cast ==
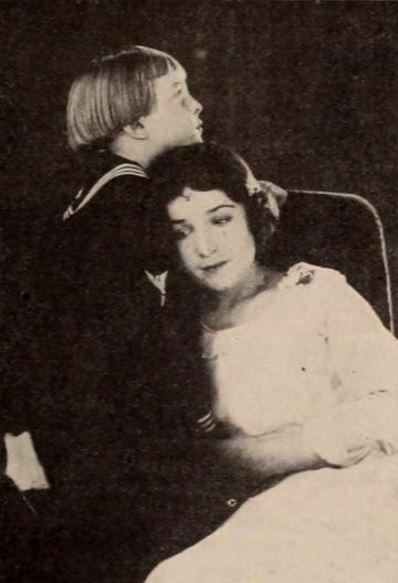
Ben Alexander (l.), Florence Vidor (r.)

- Florence Vidor as Beverly Tucker
- Roscoe Karns as Dal Tucker
- Ben Alexander as Little Ben Tucker
- Charles Meredith as Merle Curran
- George Nichols as Mayor Curran
- J. P. Lockney as Felix
- Willis Marks as Dobbs
- Harold Goodwin as The Grocer Boy

== Production ==
In 1919, Vidor formed an independent production company in collaboration with the New York-based First National exhibitors. The New York conglomerate controlled numerous theaters, and in a bid to break into movie production, advanced Vidor the funds to build a small 15-acre studio that Vidor christened “Vidor Village”. The financial risks in making independent films were high at a time when Hollywood was witnessing the consolidation of “an increasingly rigid studio system" where production and exhibition were subordinated to market considerations and increasingly judged on profitability.

Vidor opted to make a formula comedy-romance then in vogue starring his spouse Florence Vidor, but preserving the Christian Science precepts that had informed his work with the Brentwood Corporation.
