= Skin Deep (1922 film) =

1922 film by Lambert Hillyer

- Silver Sheet, in colour
- Directed by: Lambert Hillyer
- Written by: LeRoy Stone
- Based on: a novel, Lucky Damage, by Marc Edmund Jones
- Produced by: Thomas H. Ince
- Starring: Milton Sills; Florence Vidor
- Cinematography: Charles J. Stumar
- Music by: Walter Donaldson
- Distributed by: Associated First National (*later First National Pictures)
- Release date: September 1922
- Running time: 7 reels
- Country: USA
- Language: Silent...English intertitles

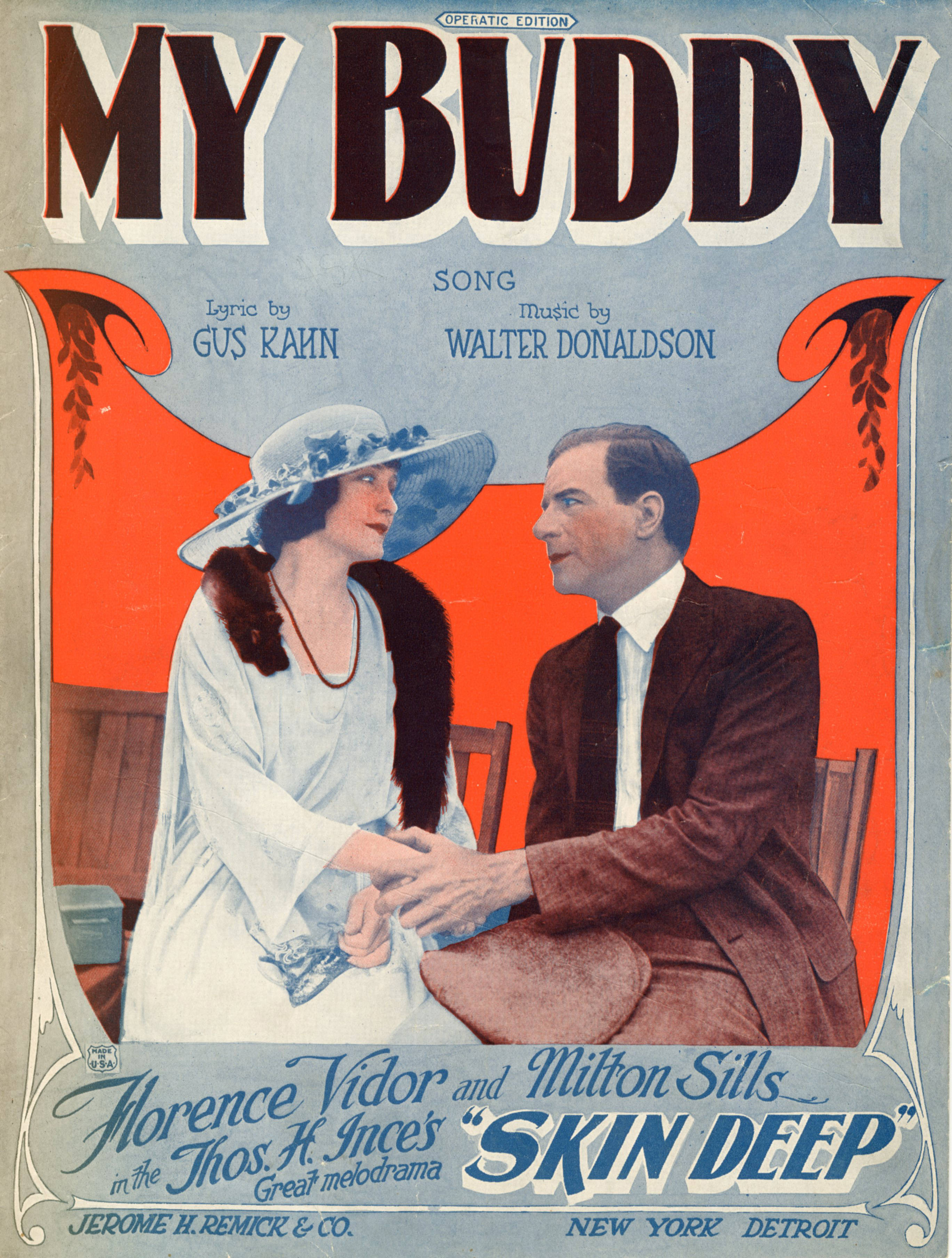
sheet music cover.

Skin Deep is a 1922 silent crime drama film directed by Lambert Hillyer and starring Milton Sills and Florence Vidor. It was based on a novel, Lucky Damage, by Marc Edmund Jones.

The Film was remade in 1929 by Warner Brothers, First National's inheritor, as Skin Deep.

== Cast ==
- Milton Sills - Bud Doyle
- Florence Vidor - Ethel Carter
- Marcia Manon - Sadie Doyle
- Charles Clary - James Carlson
- Winter Hall - Dr. Langdon
- Joe Singleton - Joe Culver
- Frank Campeau - Boss McQuarg
- Gertrude Astor - Mrs. Carlson
- Muriel Dana - Baby Carlson (*aka Muriel Frances Dana)
- B. H. DeLay - Aviator

== Preservation status ==
Prints held by Filmmuseum Netherlands now EYE Institut and the Library of Congress.
