= Beyond (1921 film) =

1921 film

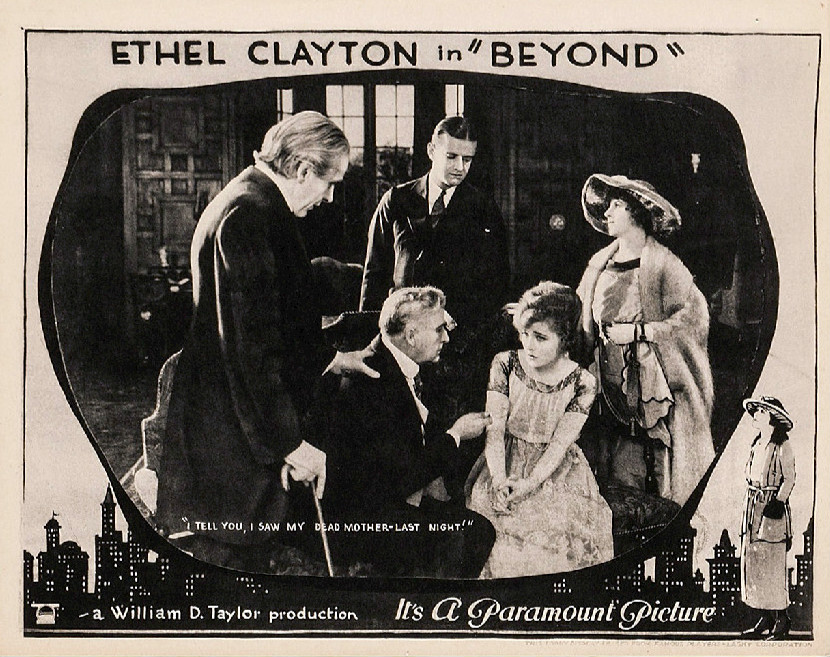
- Lobby card for film
- Directed by: William Desmond Taylor
- Screenplay by: Julia Crawford Ivers
- Based on: The Lifted Veil (play) by Henry Arthur Jones
- Produced by: Jesse L. Lasky
- Starring: Ethel Clayton; Charles Meredith; Earl Schenck
- Production company: Famous Players–Lasky Corporation
- Distributed by: Paramount Pictures
- Release date: October 30, 1921
- Running time: 5 reels
- Country: United States
- Language: Silent (English intertitles)

Beyond is a 1921 American drama silent film based on the play The Lifted Veil by Henry Arthur Jones. The film was directed by William Desmond Taylor and produced by Jesse L. Lasky. It stars Ethel Clayton, Charles Meredith and Earl Schenck. The feature was distributed by Paramount Pictures and was set in part in New Zealand. It is presumed to be a lost film.

== Plot ==
On her deathbed, the mother of Avis Langley begs her to watch over her wayward twin brother, Alec. Just before Avis is to be married to Geoffrey Southerne, Alec disappears and the spirit of Mrs. Langley appears to Avis to remind her of her promise. Samuel Ackroyd, from New Zealand, calls to explain that Alec who is engaged to his daughter has disappeared. Avis goes to New Zealand, finds Alec and persuades him to reform and marry Bessie and then sails for home. En route, the steamer is wrecked, and Avis being the only survivor is washed up on the shore of a small island. Geoffery, believing her dead, marries Viva Newmarch whom he does not love. After a year, Avis returns and her mother's spirit comes to console her. She declines to reveal that she is alive, however, until the accidental death of Viva creates the possibility of her reunion with Geoffrey.

— The American Film Institute of Motion Pictures Produced in the United States

== Cast ==
- Ethel Clayton as Avis Langley
- Charles Meredith as Geoffrey Southerne
- Earl Schenck as Alec Langley
- Fontaine La Rue as Mrs. Langley
- Winifred Kingston as Viva Newmarch
- Lillian Rich as Bessie Ackroyd
- Charles K. French as Samuel Ackroyd
- Spottiswoode Aitken as Rufus Southerne
- Herbert Fortier as Dr. Newmarch

== Background ==
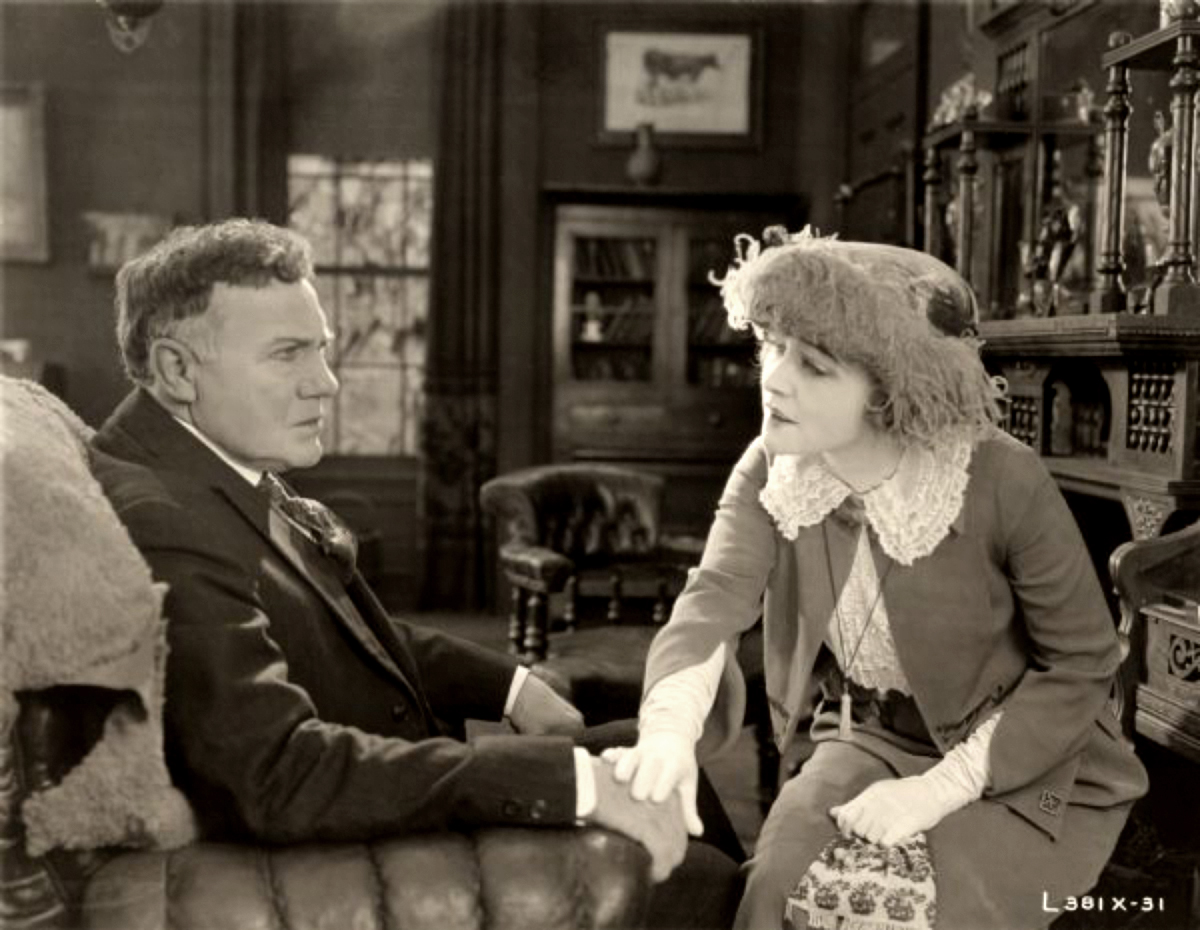
Film still of French and Clayton

The director, William Taylor told the Los Angeles Times in 1921 that, "motion pictures are in their occult age...mysticism has a strong grip on popular fancy, there are those who absorb with avidity every new idea in the subject, from the ouija board on. Others believe strongly in some one phase. But all, total scoffers included, are interested in what is said and done on the subject".

== Reviews and reception ==
Reviews for the film were generally mediocre. The New York Daily Telegraph (September 11, 1921) praised Clayton's performance saying she did "exceedingly well with the role of the daughter", and noted that the film "would not hold one's attention so well were it not for the star [Clayton] and the well thought out direction of William D. Taylor". The Moving Picture World (September 17, 1921) said of the film, "the big dramatic points seem to miss fire and the death of the second wife [is] a trick of the dramatist’s to bring about a happy ending". J. S. Dickerson's review in the Motion Picture News (September 11, 1921) was critical of the film saying, "the ghost of Ethel's mother shows up every so often to explain that everything will come out all right, but she never tells her anything that will aid in bringing this about...About the only place [Beyond] may be expected to go over is at a spiritualistic camp meeting...it has no theme worthy of respect nor technical construction unusual enough to command interest".

== Preservation ==
Beyond is preserved incomplete at the Library of Congress with only three of the five reels.

== See also ==
- My Favorite Wife (1940)
- Cast Away (2000)
