= A Fool There Was (1922 film) =

1922 film by Emmett J. Flynn

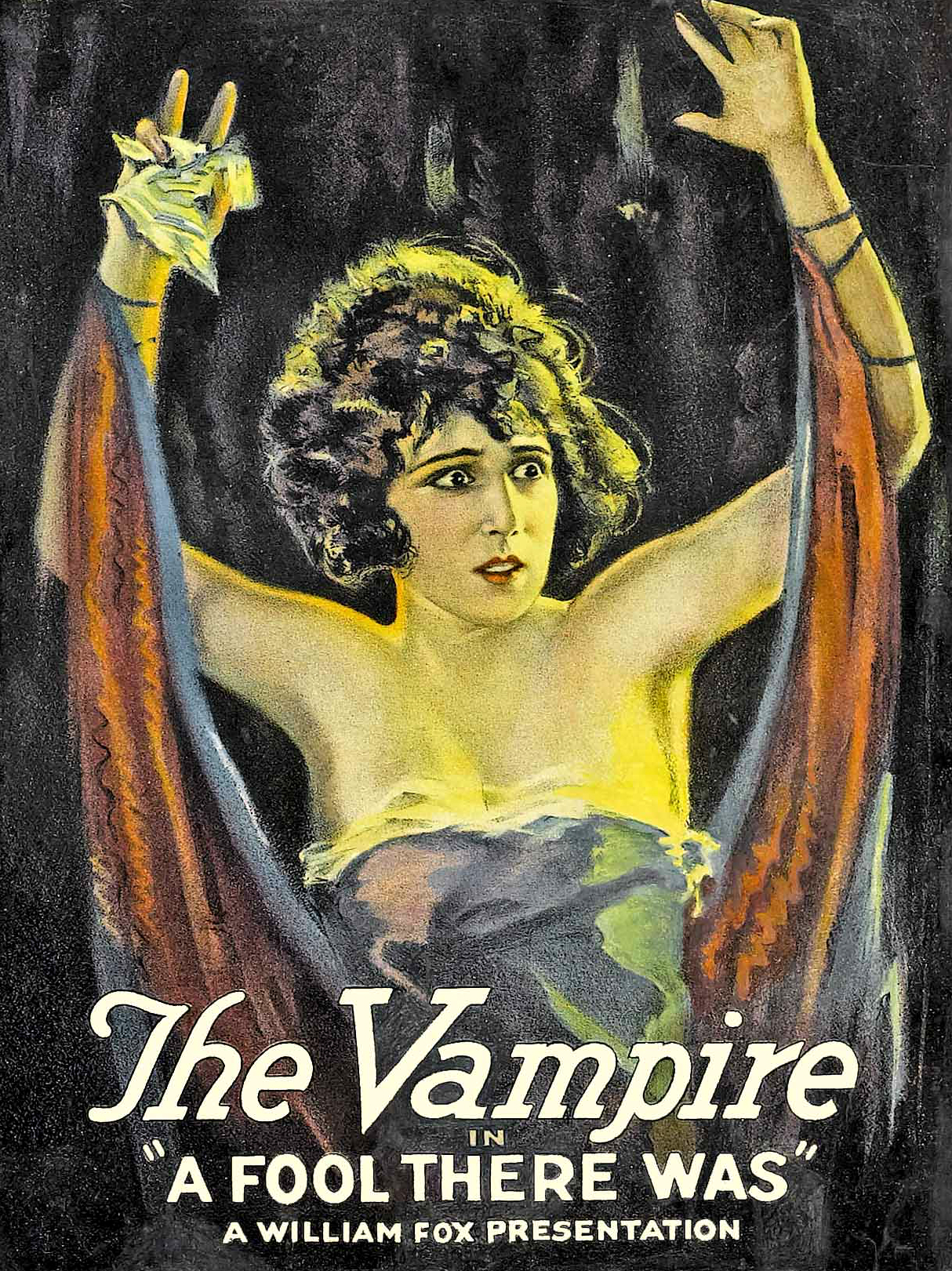
- Theatrical release poster
- Directed by: Emmett J. Flynn
- Screenplay by: Bernard McConville
- Based on: A Fool There Was by Porter Emerson Browne
- Starring: Estelle Taylor; Lewis Stone; Irene Rich; Muriel Frances Dana; Marjorie Daw; Mahlon Hamilton
- Cinematography: Lucien Andriot
- Production company: Fox Film Corporation
- Distributed by: Fox Film Corporation
- Release date: June 18, 1922
- Running time: 70 minutes
- Country: United States
- Language: Silent (English intertitles)

A Fool There Was is a 1922 American drama film directed by Emmett J. Flynn and written by Bernard McConville. It is based on the 1909 play A Fool There Was by Porter Emerson Browne. The film stars Estelle Taylor, Lewis Stone, Irene Rich, Muriel Frances Dana, Marjorie Daw and Mahlon Hamilton. It was released on June 18, 1922, by Fox Film Corporation and is considered a lost film.

== Cast ==
- Estelle Taylor as Gilda Fontaine
- Lewis Stone as John Schuyler
- Irene Rich as Mrs. Schuyler
- Muriel Frances Dana as Muriel Schuyler
- Marjorie Daw as Nell Winthrop
- Mahlon Hamilton as Tom Morgan
- Wallace MacDonald as Avery Parmelee
- William V. Mong as Boggs
- Harry Lonsdale as Parks
