= Panthea (film) =

1917 film by Allan Dwan

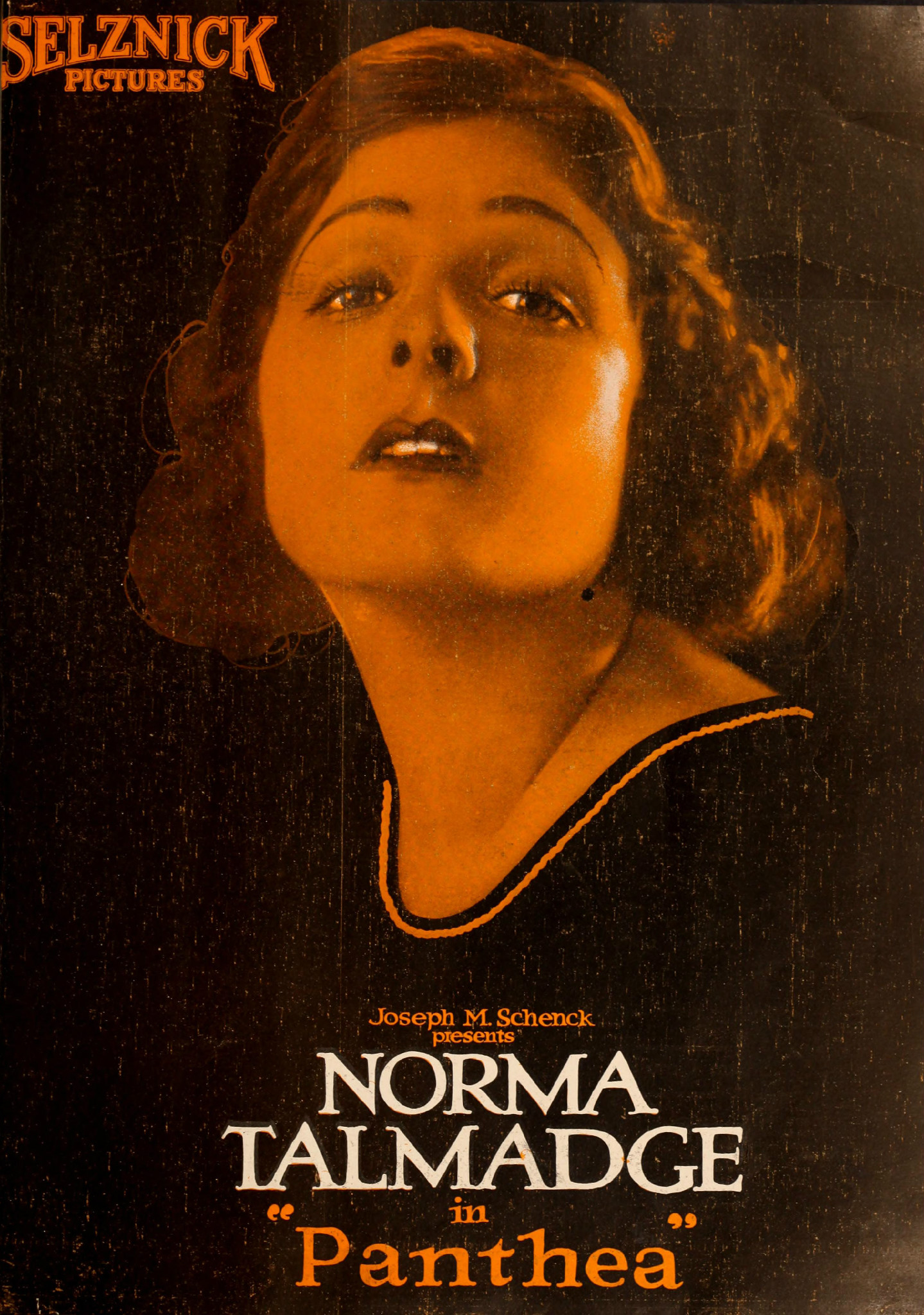
- Advertisement
- Directed by: Allan Dwan
- Written by: Mildred Considine; Allen Dwan
- Based on: Panthea by Monckton Hoffe
- Produced by: Allan Dwan; Joseph M. Schenck; Norma Talmadge
- Starring: Norma Talmadge; Earle Foxe; L. Rogers Lytton
- Cinematography: Roy Overbaugh; Harold Rosson
- Distributed by: Selznick Pictures
- Release date: January 11, 1917
- Running time: 78 minutes
- Country: United States
- Language: Silent (English intertitles)

Panthea is a 1917 American silent drama film directed by Allan Dwan and starring Norma Talmadge. This was the first film Talmadge made after leaving D. W. Griffith's company to form her own production company with Joseph M. Schenck. It is believed to be a lost film. It was last shown in Venice in 1958.

== Cast ==
- Norma Talmadge as Panthea Romoff
- Earle Foxe as Gerald Mordaunt
- L. Rogers Lytton as Baron de Duisitor
- George Fawcett as Prefect of Police
- Murdock MacQuarrie as Police Agent
- Erich von Stroheim as Lieutenant
- Norbert Wicki as Ivan Romoff
- William L. Abingdon as Sir Henry Mordaunt
- Winifred Harris as Gerard's Mother
- Eileen Percy as Gerard's Sister (credited as Elaine Persey)
- Stafford Windsor as Percival
- Richard Rosson as Pablo Centeno
- Frank Currier as Dr. Von Reichstadt
- Herbert Barry
- Jack Meredith

== Production ==
The film was shot at the former Biograph studio in New York.

== Release ==
Panthea opened in U.S. theaters in January, 1917, and performed well at the box office. Talmadge made several personal appearances to help the film, often wearing her costumes from the film. It was well reviewed; Julian Johnson of Photoplay described the film as "staged with an eye both to artistic lighting and dramatic effect, true to life even in its most melodramatic moments, tingling with suspense, saturate with sympathy."

Selznick Enterprises re-released Panthea in 1923 to extremely good business. It was screened at the Venice Film Festival in 1958, but has since not been available, leading to the consensus that it is a lost film.
