= Can a Woman Love Twice? =

1923 film

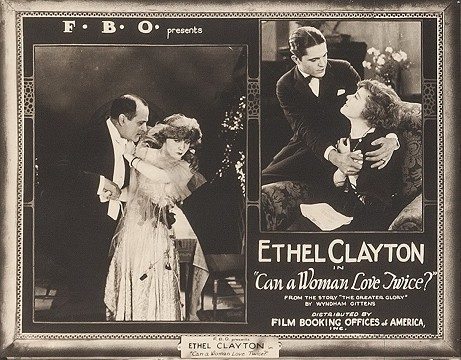
- Directed by: James W. Horne
- Written by: Wyndham Gittens
- Starring: Ethel Clayton; Muriel Frances Dana; Kate Lester
- Cinematography: Irving Allen; Joseph A. Dubray
- Edited by: James B. Morley
- Production company: Robertson-Cole Pictures Corporation
- Distributed by: Film Booking Offices of America; Wardour Films (UK)
- Release date: March 4, 1923
- Running time: 70 minutes
- Country: United States
- Languages: Silent; English intertitles

Can a Woman Love Twice? is a 1923 American silent drama film directed by James W. Horne and starring Ethel Clayton, Muriel Frances Dana and Kate Lester.

== Synopsis ==
Mary Grant, a war widow, supports herself and her child by working in a cabaret. She receives an offer from Abner Grant to live at his ranch, and he mistakenly believes her to be the wife of his own son who died in World War I. Unexpectedly this son does return home alive and eventually the two become a genuine couple.

== Cast ==
- Ethel Clayton as Mary Grant
- Muriel Frances Dana as Thomas Jefferson Grant Jr
- Kate Lester as Mrs. Grant
- Fred Esmelton as Coleman Grant
- Victory Bateman as Mary's Landlady
- Wilfred Lucas as Franklyn Chase
- Bertram Anderson-Smith as Detective Means
- Al Hart as Abner Grant
- Malcolm McGregor as Abner's Son
- Theodore von Eltz as Thomas Jefferson Grant
- Carrie Clark Ward as Housekeeper
- Madge Hunt as Nurse

== Bibliography ==
- Connelly, Robert B. The Silents: Silent Feature Films, 1910-36, Volume 40, Issue 2. December Press, 1998.
- Munden, Kenneth White. The American Film Institute Catalog of Motion Pictures Produced in the United States, Part 1. University of California Press, 1997.
