= Christine of the Hungry Heart =

1924 film by George Archainbaud

- Silver Sheet
- Directed by: George Archainbaud
- Written by: Bradley King
- Story by: Kathleen Norris
- Produced by: Thomas H. Ince
- Starring: Florence Vidor
- Cinematography: Henry Sharp
- Distributed by: First National Pictures
- Release date: October 12, 1924
- Running time: 80 mins.
- Country: United States
- Language: Silent (English intertitles)

Christine of the Hungry Heart is a 1924 American silent drama film directed by George Archainbaud and starring Florence Vidor. It was produced by Thomas H. Ince and released through First National Pictures.

== Plot ==
As described in a review in a film magazine, Christine Madison marries Stuart Knight. He is a heavy drinker and prefers the company of his companions to that of his wife’s more polite circle. She realizes a loss of love, and becomes interested in Dr. Monteagle, an orthopedic specialist. When she realizes his love and her reciprocation, she hurries from him. One her way home there is an automobile crash and her intoxicated husband, joy riding with one of his young charmers, is at the wheel. Monteagle wins her back and marries her. Christine finds devotion to science no more tolerable than the worship of Bacchus. She elopes with Ivan Vianney, but even before they reach their objective, Rio de Janeiro, she realizes that the man is wrapped up in his work. Monteagle reclaims his little son by cable to the consulate and Christine leaves Ivan, realizing a little too late, that all men make marriage secondary to their love. Eventually, Christine makes atonement through nursing her first husband through his last illness, and Monteagle promises to try and assuage her heart-hunger if she will come back to him and her boy.

== Cast ==
- Florence Vidor as Christine Madison
- Clive Brook as Dr. Alan Monteagle
- Ian Keith as Ivan Vianney
- Warner Baxter as Stuart Knight
- Walter Hiers as Dan Madison
- Lillian Lawrence as Mrs. Michael Knight
- Dorothy Brock as Jeffy
- Tommy Hicks as Fat kid

== Preservation ==
A fragment of a print from Christine of the Hungry Heart exists in the George Eastman Museum Motion Picture Collection.
