= The Thirteenth Commandment =

1920 film by Robert G. Vignola

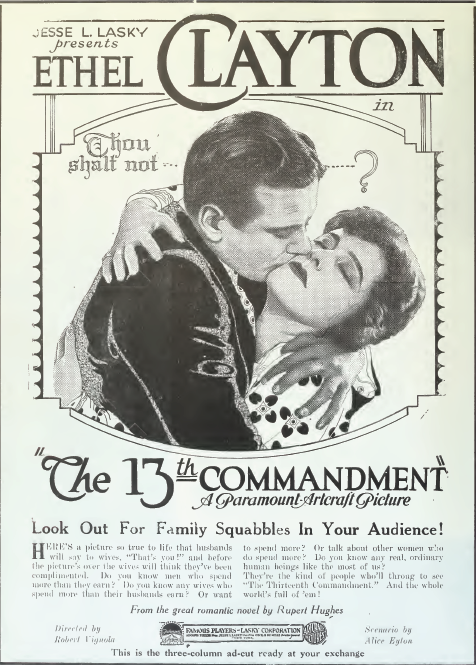
- Ad for film
- Directed by: Robert G. Vignola
- Screenplay by: Alice Eyton
- Based on: The Thirteenth Commandment by Rupert Hughes
- Produced by: Jesse L. Lasky
- Starring: Ethel Clayton; Charles Meredith; Monte Blue; Anna Q. Nilsson; Irving Cummings; Winter Hall
- Cinematography: James Van Trees
- Production companies: Artcraft Pictures Corporation; Famous Players–Lasky Corporation
- Distributed by: Paramount Pictures
- Release date: January 17, 1920
- Running time: 50 minutes
- Country: United States
- Language: Silent (English intertitles)

The Thirteenth Commandment is a 1920 American silent drama film directed by Robert G. Vignola and written by Alice Eyton. The film stars Ethel Clayton, Charles Meredith, Monte Blue, Anna Q. Nilsson, Irving Cummings and Winter Hall. It is based on the 1916 novel The Thirteenth Commandment by Rupert Hughes. The film was released on January 17, 1920, by Paramount Pictures. It is not known whether the film currently survives.

== Cast ==
- Ethel Clayton as Daphne Kip
- Charles Meredith as Clay Wimborn
- Monte Blue as Bayard Kip
- Anna Q. Nilsson as Leila Kip
- Irving Cummings as Thomas Warwick Duane
- Winter Hall as Roger Kip Sr.
- Lucille Ward as Mrs. Kip Sr.
- Arthur Maude as Mr. Wtherell
- Beverly Travers as Sheila Kemble
- Louis Morrison as Herman Reben
- Jane Wolfe as Mrs. Chivvis
