= You Never Know Women =

1926 film by William A. Wellman

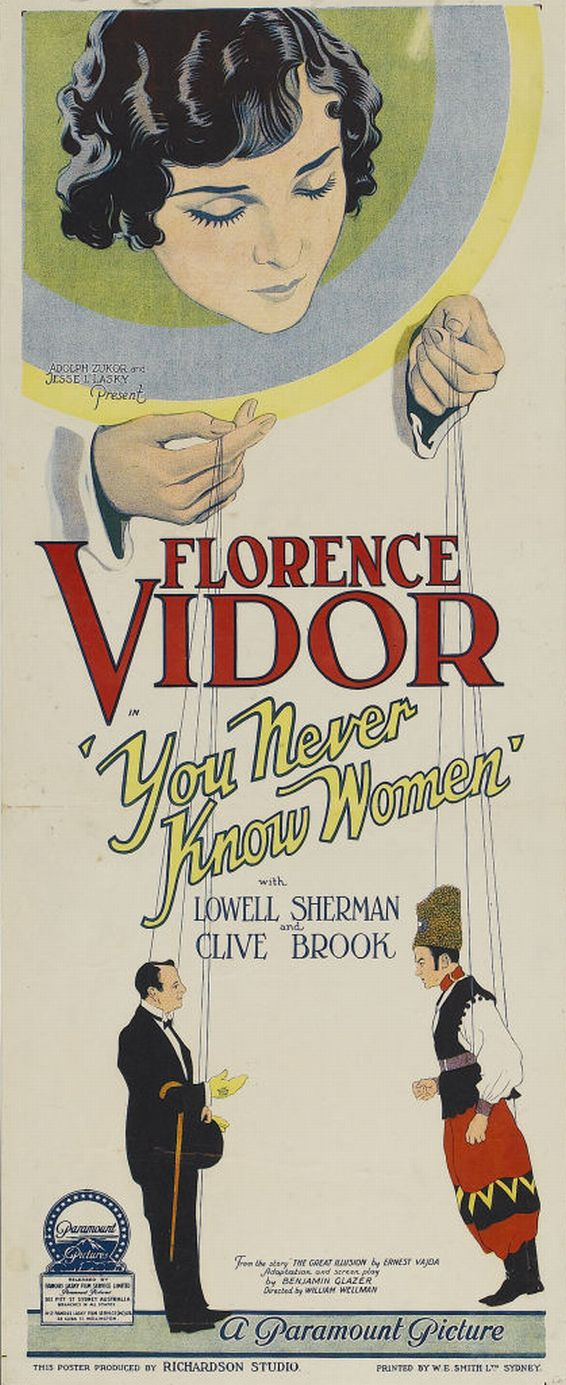
- Theatrical release poster
- Directed by: William A. Wellman
- Written by: Benjamin Glazer (scenario)
- Story by: Ernest Vajda
- Produced by: Adolph Zukor; Jesse L. Lasky
- Starring: Florence Vidor; Lowell Sherman
- Cinematography: Victor Milner
- Distributed by: Paramount Pictures
- Release date: September 20, 1926
- Running time: 6 reels (6,064 feet)
- Country: United States
- Language: Silent (English intertitles)

You Never Know Women (1926)

You Never Know Women is a 1926 American silent romantic drama film from director William A. Wellman that was produced by Famous Players–Lasky and distributed by Paramount Pictures. The stars of the picture are Florence Vidor, Lowell Sherman, and Clive Brook.

== Cast ==
- Florence Vidor as Vera
- Lowell Sherman as Eugene Foster
- Clive Brook as Norodin
- El Brendel as Toberchik
- Roy Stewart as Dimitri
- Joe Bonomo as The Strong Man
- Irma Kornelia as Olga
- Sidney Bracey as Manager
- Eugene Pallette as ?uncredited

== Preservation ==
The Library of Congress has a 35mm print of the film.

Kino Classics released a restoration on October 23, 2018. It is available on both Blu-ray and DVD.
