= The Ladder of Lies =

1920 film by Tom Forman

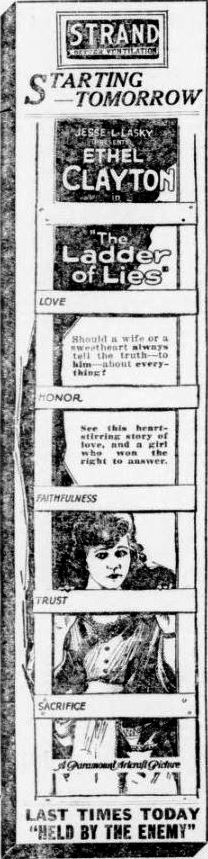
- Newspaper advertisement
- Directed by: Tom Forman
- Screenplay by: Edith Kennedy
- Story by: Harold Vickers
- Produced by: Jesse L. Lasky
- Starring: Ethel Clayton; Clyde Fillmore; Jean Acker; Irving Cummings; Charles Meredith; Ruth Ashby
- Cinematography: William Marshall
- Production companies: Artcraft Pictures Corporation; Famous Players–Lasky Corporation
- Distributed by: Paramount Pictures
- Release date: July 11, 1920
- Running time: 50 minutes
- Country: United States
- Language: Silent (English intertitles)

The Ladder of Lies is a lost 1920 American silent drama film directed by Tom Forman and written by Edith Kennedy from a story by Harold Vickers. The film stars Ethel Clayton, Clyde Fillmore, Jean Acker, Irving Cummings, Charles Meredith, and Ruth Ashby. The film was released on July 11, 1920, by Paramount Pictures.

== Plot ==
Edith Parrish is a magazine illustrator whose publisher friend, Peter Gordon, has married an "unworthy wife", Dora Leroy. To keep her friend from being shattered by his wife's infidelity with Ralph Brent, Edith begins a series of lies to cover up the affair. However, this leads to suspicion that she is having a romance with Brent, which causes her true love, John Blaine, to doubt her. Brent, who respects Edith, comes clean to Blaine about the situation, and he and Edith are reconciled. Sources:

== Cast ==
- Ethel Clayton as Edith Parrish
- Clyde Fillmore as Peter Gordon
- Jean Acker as Dora Leroy
- Irving Cummings as Ralph Brent
- Charles Meredith as John Blaine
- Ruth Ashby as Maid
