= The Girl of My Heart =

1920 silent film

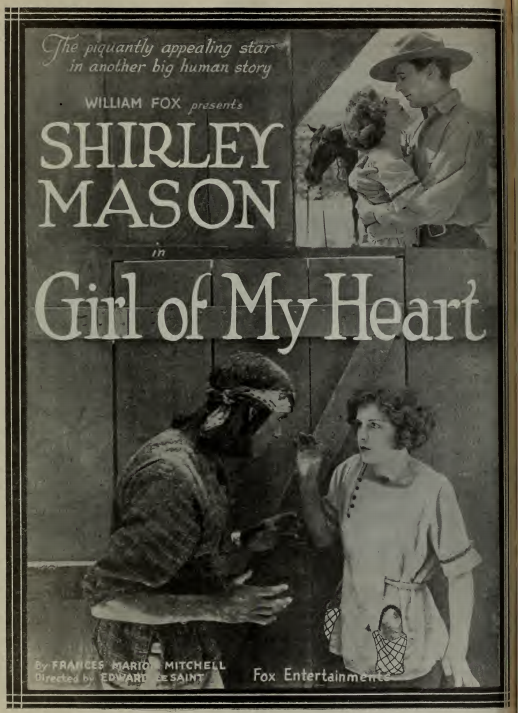
- Directed by: Edward LeSaint
- Written by: Frances Marian Mitchell (novel); Mildred Considine; Edward LeSaint
- Produced by: William Fox
- Starring: Shirley Mason; Raymond McKee; Martha Mattox
- Cinematography: Friend Baker
- Production company: Fox Film
- Distributed by: Fox Film
- Release date: October 24, 1920
- Running time: 50 minutes
- Country: United States
- Languages: Silent; English intertitles

The Girl of My Heart is a lost 1920 American silent adventure-drama film directed by Edward LeSaint and starring Shirley Mason, Raymond McKee and Martha Mattox.

== Cast ==
- Shirley Mason as Joan
- Raymond McKee as Rodney White
- Martha Mattox as Prudence White
- Al Fremont as Major Philips
- Cecil Van Auker as Dr. Norman
- Calvin Weller as Mona
- Hooper Toler as Chawa
- Alfred Weller as Pedro

== Bibliography ==
- Solomon, Aubrey. The Fox Film Corporation, 1915-1935: A History and Filmography. McFarland, 2011.
