= The Little 'Fraid Lady =

1920 film by John G. Adolfi

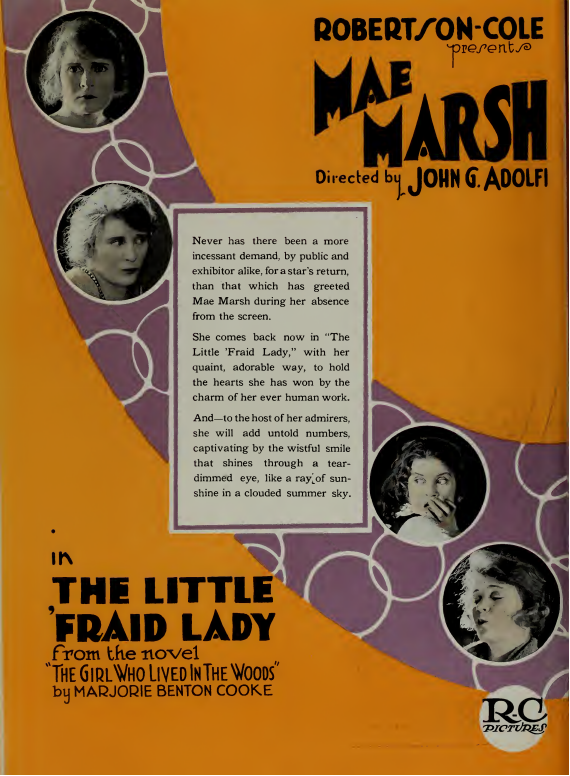
- Advertisement
- Directed by: John G. Adolfi
- Written by: Marjorie Benton Cooke (novel)
- Starring: Mae Marsh
- Cinematography: Georges Benoît
- Production company: Robertson-Cole Pictures Corporation
- Distributed by: Robertson-Cole Distributing Corporation
- Release date: December 14, 1920
- Running time: 6 reels
- Country: United States
- Language: Silent (English intertitles)

The Little 'Fraid Lady is a 1920 American silent drama film directed by John G. Adolfi and starring Mae Marsh.

== Cast ==
- Mae Marsh as Cecilia Carne
- Tully Marshall as Giron
- Kathleen Kirkham as Mrs. Helen Barrett
- Charles Meredith as Saxton Graves
- Herbert Prior as Judge Peter Carteret
- Gretchen Hartman as Sirotta
- George Bartholow as Bobby Barrett

== Bibliography ==
- Donald W. McCaffrey & Christopher P. Jacobs. Guide to the Silent Years of American Cinema. Greenwood Publishing, 1999. ISBN 0-313-30345-2
