= Hail the Woman =

1921 film by John Griffith Wray

- Silver Sheet cover, colour
- Directed by: John Griffith Wray
- Written by: C. Gardner Sullivan
- Produced by: Thomas H. Ince
- Starring: Florence Vidor; Lloyd Hughes; Theodore Roberts
- Cinematography: Henry Sharp (*French Wikipedia)
- Production company: Thomas H. Ince Productions
- Distributed by: Associated Producers
- Release date: November 28, 1921
- Running time: 80 minutes
- Country: United States
- Language: Silent (English intertitles)

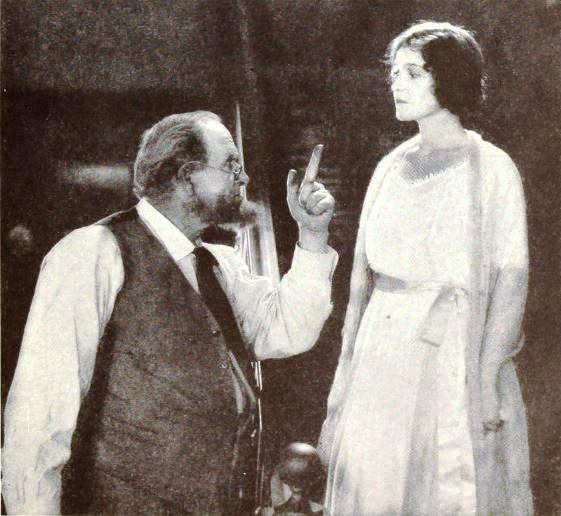
Film still with Roberts and Vidor

Hail the Woman is a 1921 American silent drama film directed by John Griffith Wray. Produced by Thomas Ince, it stars Florence Vidor as a woman who takes a stand against the hypocrisy of her father and brother, played by Theodore Roberts and Lloyd Hughes respectively.

== Plot ==
Oliver Beresford is a controlling and uncompromisingly rigid father. When shameful stories about his daughter Judith surface, he bans her from his house. Her brother David is training for the ministry at his father's insistence, but he has secretly wed Nan Higgins, the stepdaughter of an odd-jobs man, and has fathered a child. Oliver Beresford, learning the truth, buys the silence of the odd-jobs man who then evicts the pregnant Nan from his home. Nan travels to New York where she becomes a prostitute after the baby is born. Seeking a career, Judith also goes to New York where she finds Nan and her baby just as the young woman is dying. Judith decides to raise the child, and later she returns to New England, on the day that David is to be ordained, and confronts him with the child in front of the congregation.

== Cast ==
- Florence Vidor as Judith Beresford
- Lloyd Hughes as David Beresford
- Theodore Roberts as Oliver Beresford
- Gertrude Claire as Mrs. Beresford
- Madge Bellamy as Nan Higgins
- Tully Marshall as "Odd Jobs Man"
- Vernon Dent as Joe Hurd
- Edward Martindel as Wyndham Gray
- Charles Meredith as Richard Stuart
- Mathilde Brundage as Mrs. Stuart
- Eugene Hoffman as The Baby
- Muriel Frances Dana as David Junior

== Preservation status ==
Complete copies of the film survive. The Library of Congress holds a 35mm nitrate negative and a 35mm acetate master positive. The film is also preserved in the archives of the Museum of Modern Art in New York as well as in the Cinematheque Royale de Belgique in Brussels.
