= The Cradle (film) =

1922 film by Paul Powell

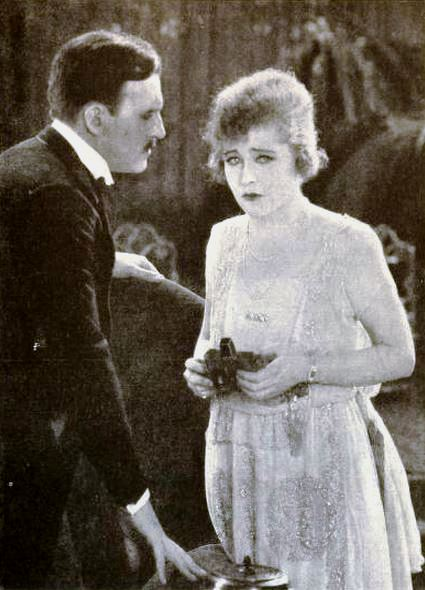
- Still with Walter McGrail and Ethel Clayton
- Directed by: Paul Powell
- Screenplay by: Olga Printzlau
- Based on: Le Berceau (play) by Eugène Brieux
- Produced by: Jesse L. Lasky
- Starring: Ethel Clayton; Charles Meredith; Mary Jane Irving; Anna Lehr; Walter McGrail; Adele Farrington
- Cinematography: Harold Rosson
- Production company: Famous Players–Lasky Corporation
- Distributed by: Paramount Pictures
- Release date: March 4, 1922
- Running time: 50 minutes
- Country: United States
- Language: Silent (English intertitles)

The Cradle is a 1922 American silent drama film directed by Paul Powell and written by Olga Printzlau. The film stars Ethel Clayton, Charles Meredith, Mary Jane Irving, Anna Lehr, Walter McGrail, and Adele Farrington. The film was released on March 4, 1922, by Paramount Pictures.

The film is preserved in the Library of Congress collections.

== Plot ==
As described in a film magazine, Margaret Harvey's husband, physician Dr. Robert Harvey, is won away from his home by an attractive patient. A divorce follows and the doctor marries the patient. Margaret marries an old admirer, and the child Doris is assigned to the custody of both parents for alternate periods of six months each. Both the step-mother and step-father resent the child's presence in their homes, and estrangement disturbs both households. The serious illness of the child results in the realization that the bond of parentage is stronger than man-made marriage, and the film closes with two more divorces and the prospect of a remarriage.

== Cast ==
- Ethel Clayton as Margaret Harvey
- Charles Meredith as Dr. Robert Harvey
- Mary Jane Irving as Doris Harvey
- Anna Lehr as Lola Forbes
- Walter McGrail as Courtney Webster
- Adele Farrington as Mrs. Mason
