= Luck in Pawn =

1919 film by Walter Edwards

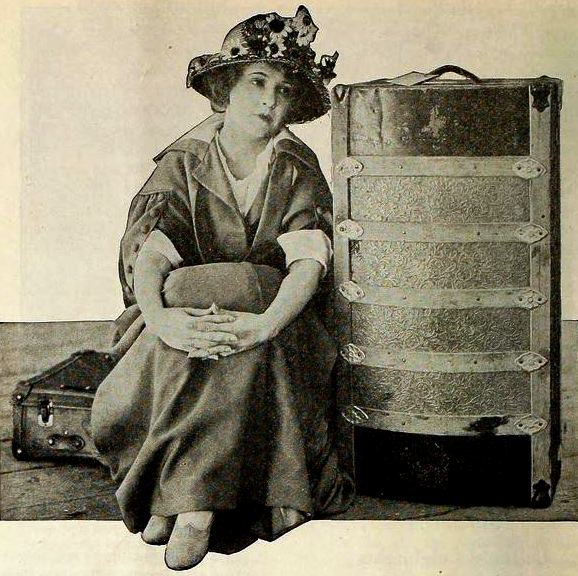
- Cropped still with Marguerite Clark
- Directed by: Walter Edwards
- Written by: Alice Eyton (scenario)
- Based on: Luck in Pawn by Marvin Taylor
- Produced by: Adolph Zukor; Jesse L. Lasky
- Starring: Marguerite Clark
- Cinematography: Hal Young
- Distributed by: Paramount Pictures
- Release date: November 19, 1919
- Running time: 5 reels; 4,451 feet
- Country: United States
- Language: Silent (English intertitles)

Luck in Pawn is a 1919 American silent romance film starring Marguerite Clark and directed by Walter Edwards. It was produced by Famous Players–Lasky and distributed through Paramount Pictures. The film is based on a play by Marvin Taylor, Luck in Pawn, and ran briefly on Broadway in 1919.

The film is listed as being preserved at the Library of Congress and New Zealand Film Archive.

== Cast ==
- Marguerite Clark as Annabel Lee
- Charles Meredith as Richard Standish Norton
- Leota Lorraine as Beth Vance
- Richard Wayne as Cole Bently
- John Steppling as Abraham Armsby
- Lillian Langdon as Mrs. Vance
- Myrtle Rishell as Mrs. Norton (credited as Myrtle Richelle)
- Lydia Knott as Mrs. Lee
- Paul Weigel as William Rainier
- Thomas Persse as Mr. Vance
- Pat Moore as Tommy Lee
- Nancy Chase as Rose Naunsell
- Dave Allen as Sam Wilzinski
