= Mildred Considine =

American screenwriter

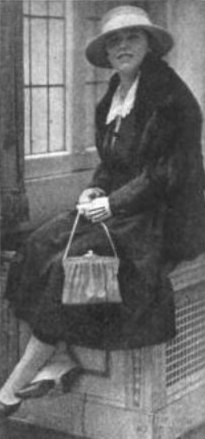
- In the Dramatic Mirror, February 9, 1918
- Born: Agnes Mildred Considine; June 16, 1887; Chicago, Illinois, US
- Died: November 15, 1933 (aged 46); Chicago, Illinois, US
- Occupation: Screenwriter
- Spouse: Archie Cherrill
- Parent: John Considine
- Relatives: John Considine Jr. (half-brother); Tim Considine (nephew); John Considine (nephew)

Mildred Considine (1887–1933) was an American screenwriter and actress active during Hollywood's silent era.

== Biography ==
=== Origins ===
Mildred was born in Chicago to John Considine (a big-time vaudeville promoter and theater manager who attracted a fair amount of controversies in his day) and Julia Nussbaumer.

Her parents divorced when she was young after her mother found out that her father—who spent a good deal of time working in Seattle—had taken up with another woman. She spent most of her childhood with her mother and stepfather in Chicago, where she later attended the Academy of Fine Arts.

=== Theatrical career ===
Given her family's vaudeville background, it was not surprising Mildred was writing and performing at venues in Chicago and around the country from a young age. Her work began to attract notice, and in 1913, she sued her father for US$100,000, alleging that he was interfering with booking agents at theaters around the country to prevent her from being booked.

=== Hollywood ambitions ===
Mildred been writing scenarios since she was 15, and had acted in a number of Essanay shorts as a teenager. By 1917, she had been hired by Constance Talmadge as a scenario editor. That same year, her first scripts, Panthea and Framing Framers, were produced and released. She later wrote for Anita Stewart and Mary Pickford, although her relationship with the latter star would turn sour in 1921 when Mildred alleged that Pickford had ripped off one of her scripts in Through the Back Door and not given proper credit. She would also sue Zelda Sears on similar grounds.

=== Death ===
She died in Chicago, Illinois on November 15, 1933, aged 46.

=== Relatives ===
Her half brother, John Considine Jr., would end up being a film producer; his sons, Tim and John, forged successful careers for themselves as actors.

== Selected filmography ==
- Panthea (1917)
- Framing Framers (1917)
- The Ghosts of Yesterday (1918)
- A Romance of the Underworld (1918)
- All Wrong (1919)
- Under Suspicion (1919)
- Let's Be Fashionable (1920)
- The Girl of My Heart (1920)
- Hearts and Masks (1921)
- The Bride's Play (1922)
- The Dangerous Little Demon (1922)
- The Real Adventure (1922)
- Heroes of the Street (1922)
