= The Other Half (1919 film) =

1919 film by King Vidor

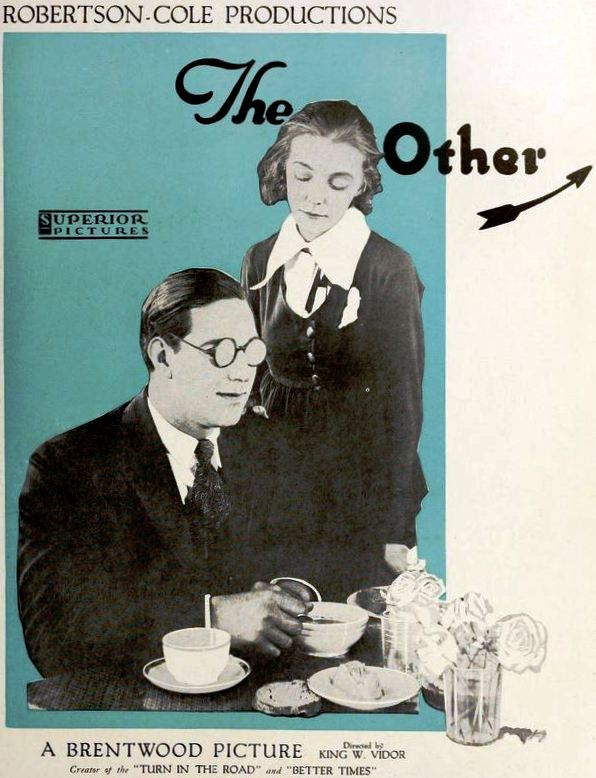
- Promotion of film featuring David Butler and ZaSu Pitts
- Directed by: King Vidor
- Written by: King Vidor
- Produced by: Joe Pasternak
- Starring: Florence Vidor; Charles Meredith
- Cinematography: Ira H. Morgan
- Production company: Brentwood Film
- Distributed by: Exhibitors Mutual; Robertson-Cole Distributing Corporation
- Release date: August 18, 1919
- Running time: 50 minutes
- Country: United States
- Language: Silent (English intertitles)

The Other Half is a 1919 American silent drama film directed by King Vidor. Produced by the Brentwood Corporation, the film starred Vidor’s wife Florence Vidor and featured comedienne ZaSu Pitts.

The picture is the third of four Christian Science-influenced films that represent a brief phase in Vidor’s output, championing the superiority of self-healing through moral strength and supplemented by the benefits of rural living. In February 2020, the film was shown at the 70th Berlin International Film Festival, as part of a retrospective dedicated to King Vidor's career.

== Plot ==
As described in a film magazine, Captain Donald Trent, whose father owns the mills that are the chief industry of the small town, returns from service in the American Expeditionary Forces in France with a clear vision of humanity and humanity's rights, deciding to start work in the plant at the bottom. With him returns Corporal Jimmy Davis who takes back his old job at the mill. Donald's sweetheart Katherine comes around, as does Jennie Jones, The Jazz Kid, making up the quartet. Then Trent Sr. dies and Donald becomes manager of the mills, quickly losing his new found views. After an accident at the mills blinds Jimmy, Donald refuses to see him. Katherine, through the editorial pages of a newspaper she has purchased, reaches Donald's heart with her columns, and brings the quartet back together in unity and happiness.

== Cast ==
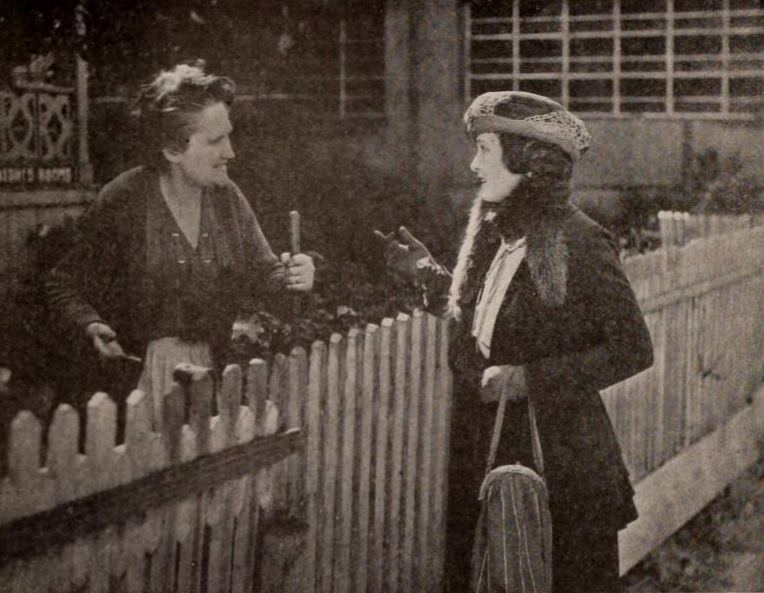
Florence Vidor (right)

- Florence Vidor as Katherine Boone
- Charles Meredith as Donald Trent
- ZaSu Pitts as Jennie Jones, The Jazz Kid
- David Butler as Cpl. Jimmy Davis
- Alfred Allen as J. Martin Trent
- Frances Raymond as Mrs. Boone
- Hugh Saxon as James Bradley
- Thomas Jefferson as Caleb Fairman
