= The Sunshine Trail =

1923 film

- Directed by: James W. Horne
- Screenplay by: Bradley King
- Story by: William Wallace Cook
- Starring: Douglas MacLean; Edith Roberts; Muriel Frances Dana; Rex Cherryman; Josie Sedgwick; Al Hart
- Cinematography: Henry Sharp
- Production company: Thomas H. Ince Corporation
- Distributed by: Associated First National Pictures
- Release date: April 23, 1923
- Running time: 50 minutes
- Country: United States
- Languages: Silent; English intertitles

The Sunshine Trail is a 1923 American silent comedy Western film directed by James W. Horne and written by Bradley King. The film stars Douglas MacLean as Jimmy McTavish, Edith Roberts, Muriel Frances Dana, Rex Cherryman, Josie Sedgwick, and Al Hart. The film was released on April 23, 1923, by Associated First National Pictures. A review in Variety noted:

From start to finish the picture satirizes and burlesques the Pollyanna theme. [...] [Jimmy McTavish's] one motto in life is "scatter seeds of kindness," etc., a guiding slogan conned from an illustrated post card. And so like all well-meaning humans who plan their kindnesses with purpose aforethought, his good intentions go astray and involve him in several embarrassing complications while he is traveling the "sunshine trail." [...] While practising one of his Pollyanna principles at a way station in minding a young child, he finds himself with the lad on his hands and so must continue his journey with a juvenile burden. Also, with the best of intention to assist an "eloping" couple who are in reality heads of a band of crooks, he effects the criminals' escape [...] although later he is solely responsible in foiling their hold-up on a bank and capturing them single-handed. [...] Much of the picture is screen persiflage but is interesting throughout for all its careless fun. Probably written to reflect a real situation humorously, the director at times has lapsed into farce and unrealistic hoke. The admixture all told is funny however.

George and Ira Gershwin, the latter under his early pen name "Arthur Francis," wrote a song for the film of the same title. Howard Pollack wrote that the song "anticipates the similarly titled 'Happy Trails'" by Dale Evans. He noted that, due its level of "pathos," the song "deserves comparison [...] with Charlie Chaplin's film music."

== Cast ==
- Douglas MacLean as James Henry McTavish
- Edith Roberts as June Carpenter
- Muriel Frances Dana as Algernon Aloysius Fitzmaurice Bangs
- Rex Cherryman as Willis Duckworth
- Josie Sedgwick as Woman Crook
- Al Hart as Col. Duckworth
- Barney Furey as Man Crook
- William Courtright as Mystery Man
