= The Quick Gun =

1964 film by Sidney Salkow

- Spanish release poster
- Directed by: Sidney Salkow
- Screenplay by: Robert E. Kent
- Based on: The Fastest Gun short story by Steve Fisher
- Produced by: Grant Whytock
- Starring: Audie Murphy
- Cinematography: Lester Shorr
- Edited by: Grant Whytock
- Music by: Richard LaSalle
- Color process: Technicolor
- Production company: Admiral Pictures
- Distributed by: Columbia Pictures
- Release date: April 1, 1964
- Running time: 89 minutes
- Country: United States
- Language: English
- Budget: $400,000

The Quick Gun is a 1964 American Techniscope Western directed by Sidney Salkow and starring Audie Murphy. It was the second of four films produced by Grant Whytock and Edward Small's Admiral Pictures in the 1960s.

The film's screenplay was based on Steve Fisher's short story The Fastest Gun that had previously provided the story for two other Westerns, Top Gun (1955) starring Sterling Hayden and Noose for a Gunman (1960) starring Jim Davis and Ted de Corsia as the villain, both for United Artists. Fisher at this time was also providing the screenplays for a series of A.C. Lyles's second-feature Techniscope Westerns for Paramount Pictures.

== Plot ==
In 1873, gunfighter Clint Cooper returns to his hometown of Shelby, Montana, after two years. He left Shelby in disgrace after killing the town's two hot-tempered but inexperienced young men in self-defense. The father of the young men, Tom Morrison feels that Cooper murdered them. Cooper plans to settle down in Shelby to claim his recently deceased father's ranch and marry his old girlfriend, Helen, the town's schoolteacher.

On the way to Shelby, he runs into his old gang, led by Spangler, who plan on not only robbing the town, but also burning it to the ground and having their way with its womenfolk. Spangler believes his former friend Clint is himself intending to rob Shelby's bank full of money from large cattle sales. Spangler seeks Clint to join his band of 15 men with the motivation of revenging himself on the town that exiled him or else he will not leave alive. Clint breaks free, killing two of his pursuers.

Clint arrives in Shelby to find all of the town's young men have left on a cattle drive. He tries to warn the town of the impending robbery, but everyone except the sheriff, an old friend of his called Scotty, and old coot Dan Evans, still hate Clint and want him to leave. Despite this welcome, Clint eventually agrees to help Scotty defend the town against the gang, though Clint discovers that Helen will marry Scotty in a week's time. Meanwhile, Tom Morrison and his nephew Rick scheme to kill Clint by making it look like self-defense.

== Cast ==
- Audie Murphy as Clint Cooper
- Merry Anders as Helen Reed
- James Best as Scotty Grant
- Ted de Corsia as Jud Spangler
- Walter Sande as Tom Morrison
- Rex Holman as Rick Morrison
- Charles Meredith as Reverend Staley
- Frank Ferguson as Dan Evans
- Mort Mills as Cagle
- Gregg Palmer as Donovan
- Frank Gerstle as George Keely
- Stephen Roberts as Dr. Stevens
- Paul Bryar as Mitchell
- Raymond Hatton as Elderly Man
- William Fawcett as Mike

== Production ==
Murphy was paid $37,500 for his performance. Originally, the film was known as The Fastest Gun. Though set in northern Montana, the film was entirely shot in southern California, which does not look like Montana at all.

== Quote ==
"Your guns have gotten too fast and too sudden. And from what I hear about your reputation, they have gotten a lot faster and suddener in the last two years." - Sheriff Scotty Grant

== See also ==
- List of American films of 1964
