= Wandering Husbands =

1924 film

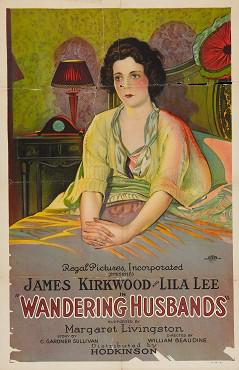
- Poster
- Directed by: William Beaudine
- Written by: C. Gardner Sullivan (screenplay)
- Produced by: Thomas H. Ince
- Starring: James Kirkwood; Lila Lee
- Cinematography: Ray June
- Distributed by: W. W. Hodkinson Corporation
- Release date: September 20, 1924
- Running time: 7 reels
- Country: United States
- Language: Silent (English intertitles)

Wandering Husbands, also known as Loves and Lies, is a 1924 American silent drama film directed by William Beaudine. It stars James Kirkwood, Lila Lee, and Margaret Livingston.

== Plot ==
As described in a film magazine review, Diana Moreland is aware of her husband's attentions to Marilyn Foster. As he does not reform, she surprises the pair while they are dining at a roadhouse and invites Marilyn to her home. The three of them go for a boat-ride. Diana has arranged to have the boat start leaking. Threatened with death by drowning, Moreland's affection for Diana reasserts itself and he starts to swim ashore with her. Marilyn, abandoned, is saved by another boat and retires defeated. The Morelands are then reconciled.

== Cast ==
- James Kirkwood as George Moreland
- Lila Lee as Diana Moreland
- Margaret Livingston as Marilyn Foster
- Eugene Pallette as Percy
- Muriel Frances Dana as Rosemary Moreland
- Turner Savage as Jim
- George C. Pearce as Bates
- George B. French as the Butler

== Preservation ==
Copies of Wandering Husbands are maintained by the UCLA Film and Television Archive and the Library of Congress.
