= Poor Relations =

1919 film directed by King Vidor

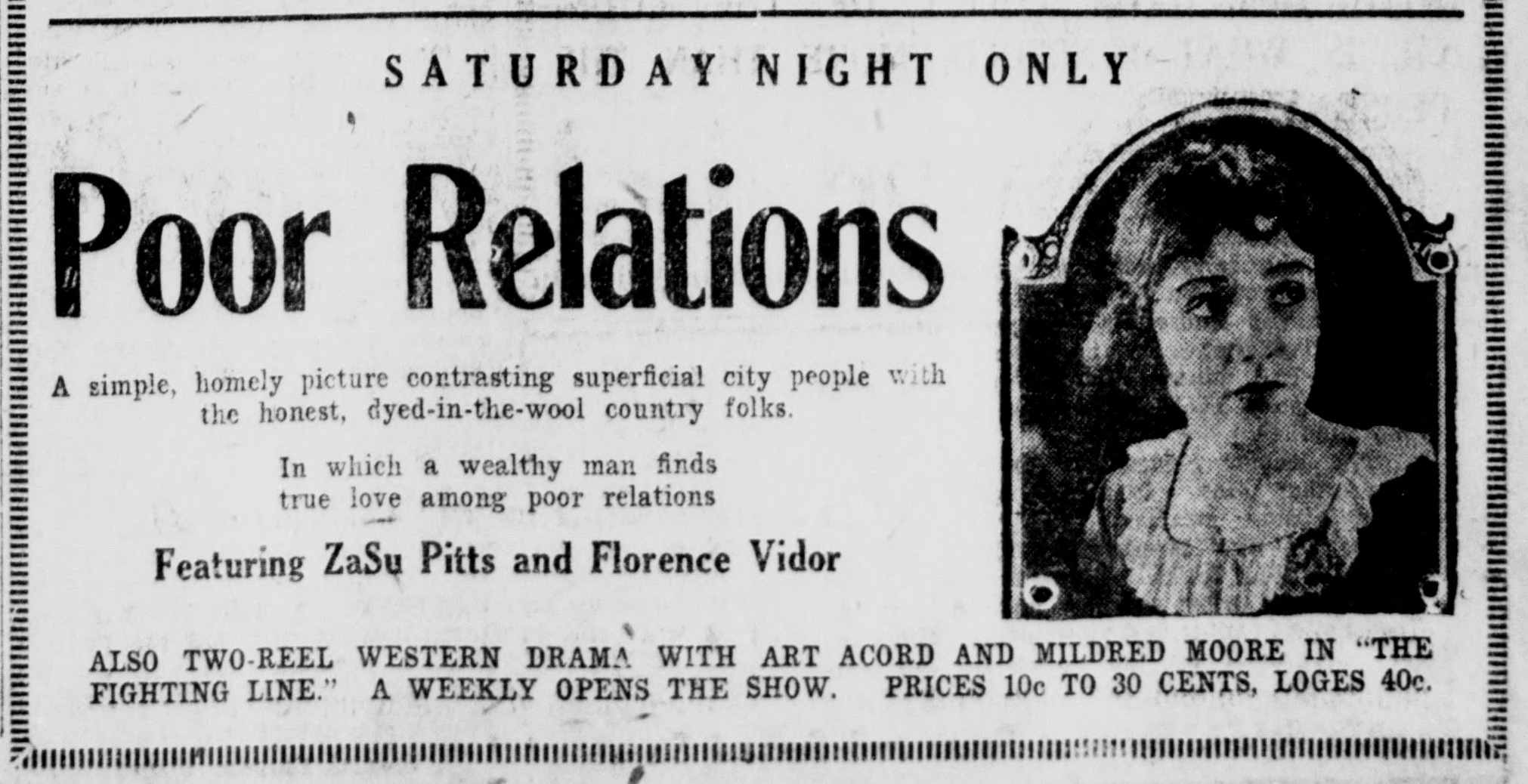
- Contemporary advertisement
- Directed by: King Vidor
- Written by: King Vidor
- Starring: Florence Vidor
- Cinematography: Ira H. Morgan
- Distributed by: Robertson-Cole
- Release date: November 1, 1919
- Running time: 50 minutes
- Country: United States
- Language: Silent with English intertitles

Poor Relations is a 1919 American silent drama film directed by King Vidor. Produced by the Brentwood Corporation, the film starred Vidor’s wife Florence Vidor and featured comedienne ZaSu Pitts.

The picture is the final of four Christian Science precept films that represent a brief phase in Vidor’s output championing the superiority of self-healing through moral strength and supplemented by the benefits of rural living.

== Plot ==
Country girl Dorothy Perkins succeeds as an architect in the city, but then is scorned by her old-money in-laws.

== Cast ==
- Florence Vidor as Dorothy Perkins
- Lillian Leighton as Ma Perkins
- William De Vaull as Pa Perkins (as William Du Vaull)
- Roscoe Karns as Henry
- ZaSu Pitts as Daisy Perkins
- Charles Meredith as Monty Rhodes

== Reception ==
The reviews were "poor". Exhibitors Trade Review observed that "the slender, fragile story has just about all it can do to make its way through the new-mown hay atmosphere."

== Theme ==
Poor Relations provides an early example of Vidor’s “feminist” presentation of professional and independent women, emphasizing reciprocal exchanges between the sexes.
