= Simple Souls =

1920 film

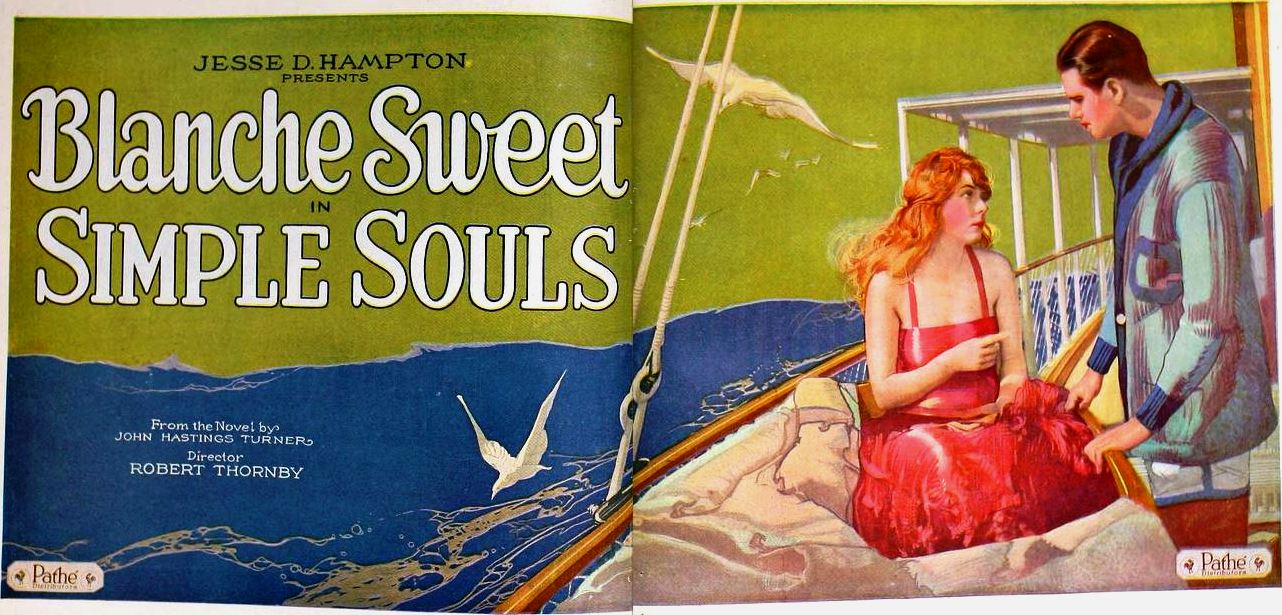
- Ad for film
- Directed by: Robert Thornby
- Written by: Fred Myton (scenario)
- Based on: Simple Souls by John Hastings Turner
- Produced by: Jesse D. Hampton
- Starring: Blanche Sweet
- Cinematography: Charles E. Kaufman
- Distributed by: Pathé Exchange
- Release date: May 12, 1920
- Running time: 6 reels; 5,264 feet
- Country: United States
- Language: Silent (English intertitles)

Simple Souls is a 1920 American silent drama film produced by Jesse Hampton and distributed through Pathé Exchange. It is based on a 1919 novel of the same name by John Hastings Turner and stars Blanche Sweet. Robert Thornby directed. It is not known whether the film currently survives.

== Plot ==
Based upon a description in a film publication, Molly Shine (Sweet) is a simple girl who likes her books, and lives with a drinking father (Grimwood) and weeping mother (Kelso). One day she meets the young Duke (Meredith) who falls in love with her and marries her, astonishing her parents who do not believe it until they see the marriage certificate. After the marriage she faces the problems of all who marry outside of their class. The Duke's sister Lady Octavia (Lester) tries to snub her at every turn, resulting in Molly's dejection and wish to leave. When an opportunity presents itself, she attempts to escape but fate returns her to her husband in a peculiar but pleasing way.

== Cast ==
- Blanche Sweet as Molly Shine
- Charles Meredith as Duke of Wynningham
- Kate Lester as Lady Octavia
- Herbert Standing as Peter Craine
- Mayme Kelso as Mrs. Shine
- Herbert Grimwood as Samuel Shine

== See also ==
- Blanche Sweet filmography
