= The Bride's Play =

1922 film by George Terwilliger

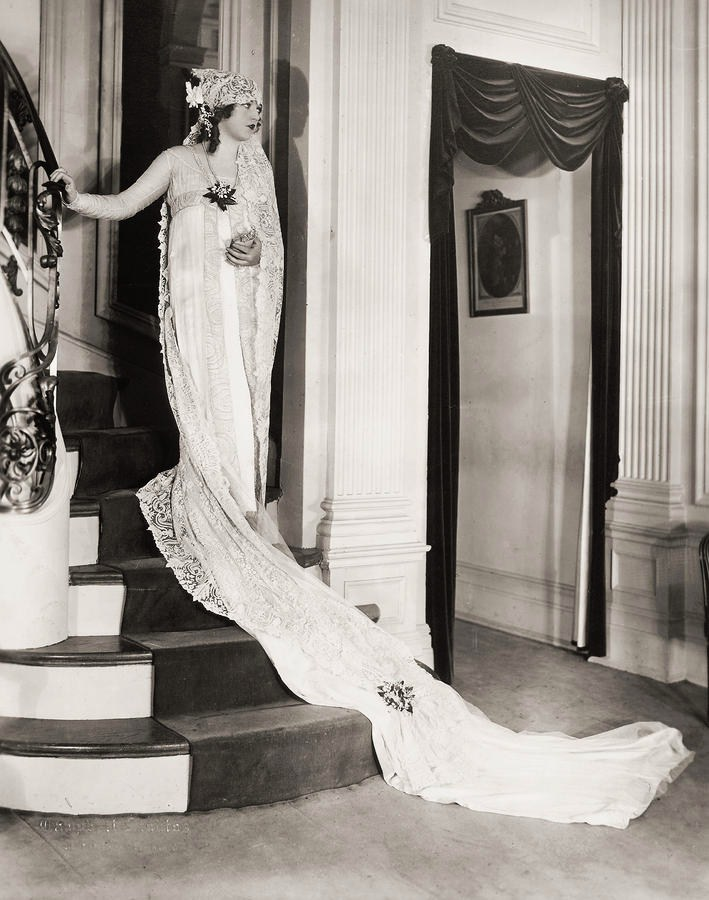
- Marion Davies in a scene in the film
- Directed by: George Terwilliger
- Written by: Mildred Considine (scenario)
- Based on: The Bride's Play (play) by Brian Oswald Donn-Byrne
- Produced by: William Randolph Hearst
- Starring: Marion Davies
- Cinematography: Ira H. Morgan
- Distributed by: Paramount Pictures
- Release date: January 22, 1922
- Running time: 72 minutes (7 reels; 6,476 feet)
- Country: United States
- Language: Silent (English intertitles)

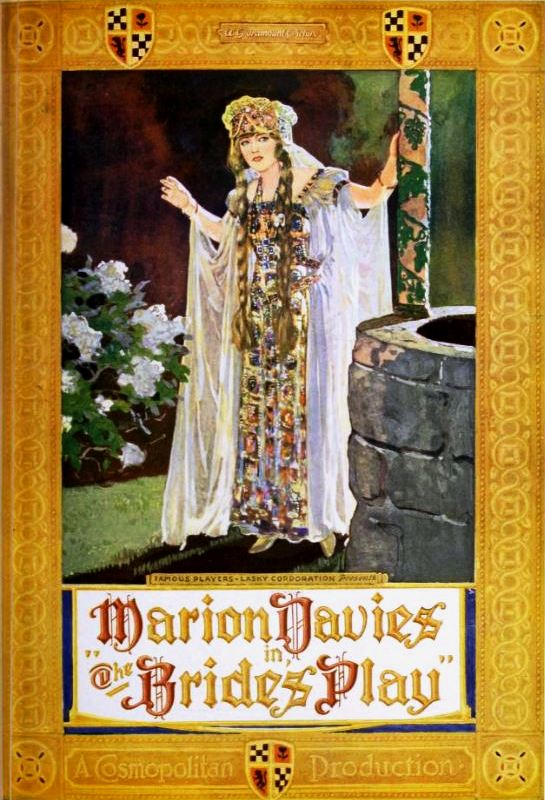
The Bride's Play, 1922 ad

The Bride's Play is a 1922 American silent romance film produced by William Randolph Hearst as a starring vehicle for Marion Davies. It was directed by George Terwilliger and distributed by Paramount Pictures. It is an extant film that is preserved at the Library of Congress.

== Plot ==
As described in a film magazine, Aileen Barrett and Sir Fergus Cassidy have been neighbors for years. He loves her but Aileen has become enamored of a poet, Bulmer Meade. When she learns that the poet regards her as but a passing whim, she realizes it is Sir Cassidy that she cares for and their wedding is arranged. The Bride's Play, which had been a custom in the Barrett family for years, is announced as being revived for the wedding. The former lover learns that several hundred years ago, during the process of the play at the wedding of a member of the family of Sir Cassidy, the bride was carried off by an old lover who arrived on the scene during its enactment. He attempts to do the same thing at Aileen's wedding, but the modern young woman, confronted with the crisis when he maliciously answers her question in the affirmative in the presence of the many wedding guests, strikes him across the face with her wedding slipper.

== Cast ==
- Marion Davies as Enid of Cashell / Aileen Barrett
- John B. O'Brien as Marquis of Muckross
- Frank Shannon as Sir John Mansfield
- Wyndham Standing as Sir Fergus Cassidy
- Carl Miller as Bulmer Meade
- Richard Cummings as John Barrett
- Eleanor Middleton as Bridget
- Thea Talbot as Sybil
- John P. Wade as Sir Robert Fennell
- Julia Hurley as Peasant Woman
- George Spink as Meade's Butler
- Louise Emmons as Faggot Carrier (uncredited)
- Arthur Lake as Boy Throwing Roses (uncredited)

== Production ==
In her 12th film, Marion Davies stars in a dual role as the modern-day Aileen and as the medieval Enid of Cashell. The massive medieval castle sets by Joseph Urban would be a harbinger of even more impressive medieval sets to come. The stunning location shooting was done at Point Lobos on the Monterey Peninsula, a about 150 miles north of San Simeon, where William Randolph Hearst had begun building his castle in 1919. For the New York City premiere, Hearst commissioned a symphonic score by George Spink (who also plays the butler), but this music now seems lost.

== Preservation status ==
A print of The Bride's Play is preserved in the Library of Congress collection Packard Campus for Audio-Visual Conservation.

== Status ==
A limited edition DVD was released by Edward Lorusso with a music score by Ben Model in 2016. The film was broadcast on Turner Classic Movies in August 2017 and January 2023.
