= Muriel Frances Dana =

American actress

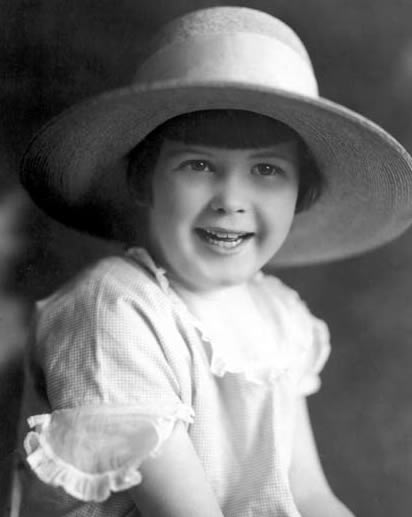
- Muriel Frances Dana
- Born: 1916; Clinton, Iowa
- Died: 1997 (aged 80–81); Thousand Oaks, California
- Occupation: film actress
- Years active: 1921–1926

Muriel Frances Dana (1916–1997) was a child actress in thirteen silent films from 1921 to 1926, appearing in two of them as a boy, Hail the Woman and Can a Woman Love Twice?.

Dana was born in Clinton, Iowa. Her parents were Walter C. Dana and Lois Mildred Dana. They divorced, and her mother married Harry K. Gibson.

In 1926, Dana's parents were involved in a legal battle when her mother charged Dana's father, grandfather, and uncle with breaking into her house in an attempt to take Dana. Gibson, who was suing Dana's mother for divorce, was also charged in the incident, as were four employees of a detective agency who accompanied the four men. Although Dana's father had custody of the girl, who was 9 years old, her mother had taken her, saying that her father had spent all of the girl's income. He responded that the expenditures were necessary for the actress's career.

Dana died in Thousand Oaks, California.

== Filmography ==
- Hail the Woman (1921)
- White Hands (1922)
- A Fool There Was (1922)
- Skin Deep (1922)
- The Forgotten Law (1922)
- Can a Woman Love Twice? (1923)
- The Sunshine Trail (1923)
- Daddies (1924)
- Wandering Husbands (1924)
- The Fast Worker (1924)
- The Sign of the Cactus (1925)
- Compromise (1925)
- Mike (1926)
