= Florence Vidor =

American actress (1895–1977)

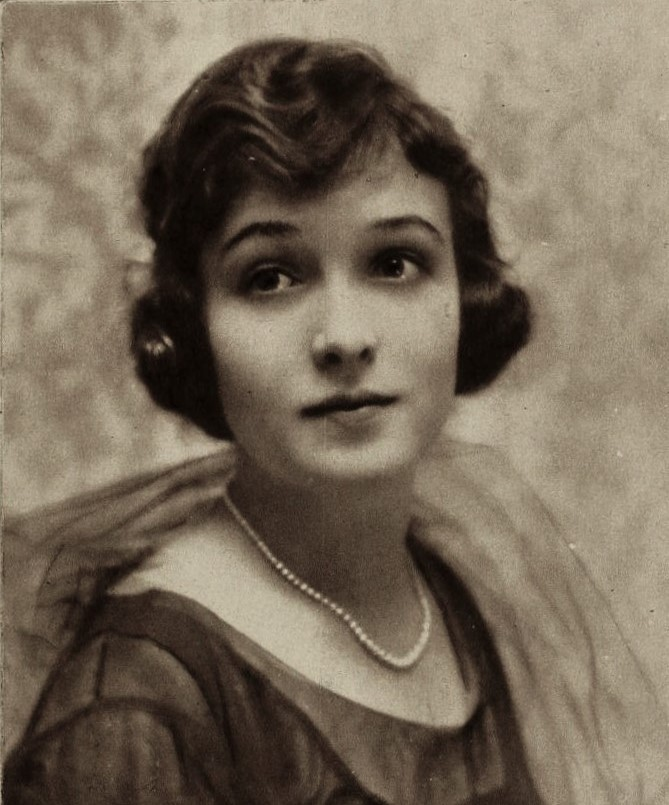
- Vidor, 1920
- Born: Florence Cobb; July 23, 1895; Houston, Texas, U.S.
- Died: November 3, 1977 (aged 82); Pacific Palisades, California, U.S.
- Occupation: Actress
- Years active: 1916–1929
- Spouses: King Vidor (m. 1915; div. 1924) Jascha Heifetz (m. 1928; div. 1945)
- Children: 3

Florence Vidor (née Cobb, later Arto; July 23, 1895 – November 3, 1977) was an American silent film actress.

She was the first wife of filmmaker King Vidor, and was later married to violinist Jascha Heifetz.

== Early life ==
Vidor was born in Houston on July 23, 1895, to John and Ida Cobb. Her parents had married in Houston on March 3, 1894, but divorced only three years later. Ida remained in Houston and soon married John P. Arto, a real estate man who later served as deputy chief of the city's fire department.

== Career ==
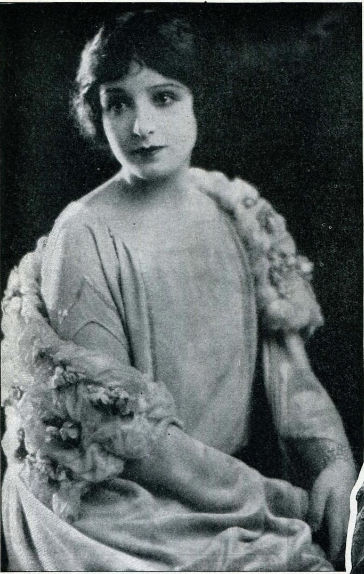
Vidor in Alice Adams (1923)

Florence Vidor started working in silent movies through the influence of her husband, film director King Vidor, whom she had married in 1915. She signed her first contract with Vitagraph Studios in 1916. Her early fame was due to her role in the 1921 film Hail the Woman. Throughout the 1920s, she was a major box office attraction for Paramount Pictures.

Her career ended with the advent of sound films. In 1929 she became so frustrated by the difficulties of making the partial sound film Chinatown Nights that she retired from acting before the production was completed. Director William A. Wellman had to use a voice double to complete some of her scenes.

== Personal life ==
Florence and King Vidor divorced in 1924. They had a daughter, Suzanne. Despite the end of their marriage, Florence continued to use Vidor as her surname.

Vidor married classical violinist Jascha Heifetz on August 20, 1928, in New York City. They had two children together and Heifetz also adopted Suzanne before divorcing in 1945.

=== Death ===
On November 3, 1977, Vidor died at her home in Pacific Palisades, California, aged 82.

== Selected filmography ==
- Bill Peter's Kid (1916, Short) - (uncredited)
- Curfew at Simpton Center (1916, Short)
- The Yellow Girl (1916, Short) - Flora
- The Intrigue (1916) - Pseudo Countess Sonia
- A Tale of Two Cities (1917) - Mimi
- American Methods (1917) - Betty Armstrong
- The Cook of Canyon Camp (1917, Lost film) - Mrs. Jack
- Hashimura Togo (1917) - Corinne Reynolds
- The Countess Charming (1917) - Betty Lovering
- The Secret Game (1917) - Kitty Little
- The Widow's Might (1918, Lost film) - Irene Stuart
- The Hidden Pearls (1918) - Enid Benton
- The Honor of His House (1918) - Lora Horning
- The White Man's Law (1918) - Maida Verne
- Old Wives for New (1918) - Juliet Raeburn
- The Bravest Way (1918) - Nume Rogers
- Till I Come Back to You (1918) - Yvonne
- A Heart in Pawn (1919) - Dr. Stone's daughter
- The Other Half (1919) - Katherine Boone
- Poor Relations (1919) - Dorothy Perkins
- The Family Honor (1920) - Beverly Tucker
- The Jack-Knife Man (1920) - Mrs. Marcia Montgomery
- Lying Lips (1921) - Nancy Abbott
- Beau Revel (1921) - Nellie Steel
- Hail the Woman (1921) - Judith Beresford
- Woman, Wake Up (1922, Lost film) - Anne
- The Real Adventure (1922) - Rose Stanton
- Dusk to Dawn (1922, Undetermined / presumed Lost) - Marjorie Latham / Aziza
- Skin Deep (1922) - Ethel Carter
- Conquering the Woman (1922) - Judith Stafford
- Souls for Sale (1923) - Himself (uncredited)
- Alice Adams (1923) - Alice Adams
- Main Street (1923, Lost film) - Carol Milford
- The Virginian (1923) - Molly Wood (Woods in credits)
- The Marriage Circle (1924) - Charlotte Braun
- Borrowed Husbands (1924, Lost film) - Nancy Burrard
- Welcome Stranger (1924, Lost film) - Mary Clark
- Barbara Frietchie (1924) - Barbara Frietchie
- Christine of the Hungry Heart (1924) - Christine Madison
- Husbands and Lovers (1924) - Grace Livingston
- The Mirage (1924, Lost film) - Irene Martin
- The Girl of Gold (1925) - Helen Merrimore
- Are Parents People? (1925) - Mrs. Hazlitt
- Grounds for Divorce (1925, Incomplete, missing third reel) - Alice Sorbier
- Marry Me (1925) - Hetty Gandy
- The Trouble with Wives (1925, Lost film) - Grace Hyatt
- The Enchanted Hill (1926, Lost film) - Gail Ormsby
- The Grand Duchess and the Waiter (1926) - The Grand Duchess Zenia
- Sea Horses (1926, Lost film) - Helen Salvia
- You Never Know Women (1926) - Vera
- The Eagle of the Sea (1926, Incomplete film) - Louise Lestron
- The Popular Sin (1926, Lost film) - Yvonne Montfort
- Afraid to Love (1927, Lost film) - Katherine Silverton
- The World at Her Feet (1927, Lost film) - Jane Randall
- One Woman to Another (1927, Lost film) - Rita Farrell
- Honeymoon Hate (1927, Lost film) - Gail Grant
- Doomsday (1928) - Mary Viner
- The Magnificent Flirt (1928, Lost film) - Mme. Florence Laverne
- The Patriot (1928, Lost film, only one reel exists) - Countess Ostermann
- Chinatown Nights (1929) - Joan Fry (final film role)
