= Woman, Wake Up =

1922 film

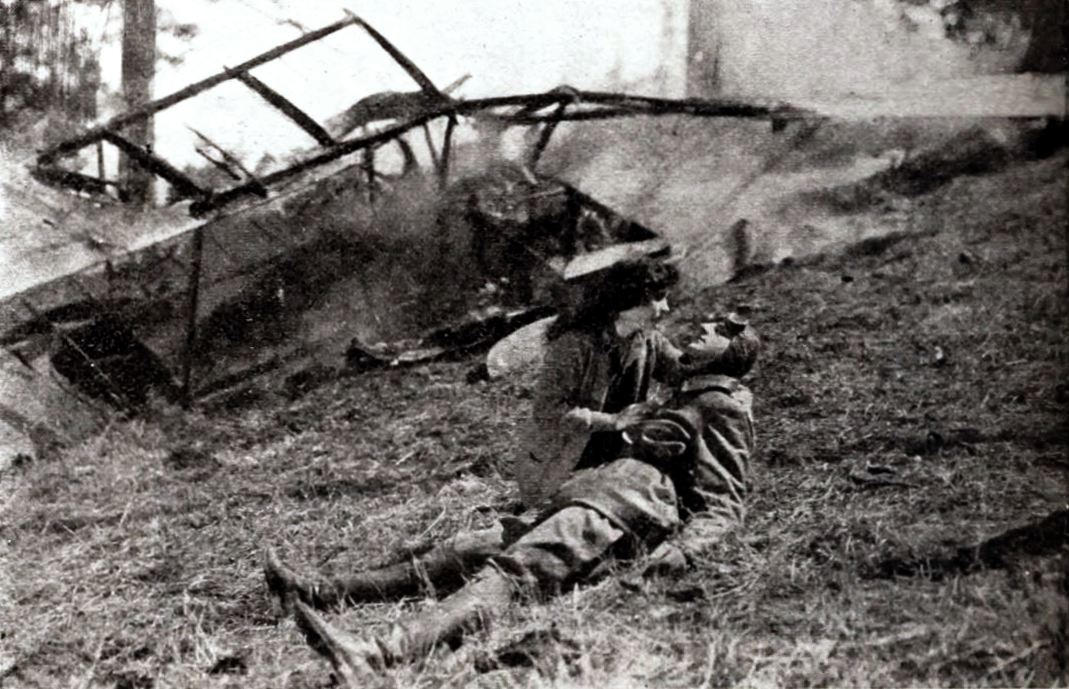
- Film still
- Directed by: Marcus Harrison
- Written by: C. B. Manly
- Story by: Ben Moore Clay; Jerry Bresler (?)
- Produced by: Florence Vidor
- Starring: Florence Vidor
- Cinematography: George Barnes
- Distributed by: Associated Exhibitors
- Release date: March 5, 1922
- Running time: 6 reels
- Country: United States
- Language: Silent (English intertitles)

Woman, Wake Up is a lost 1922 American silent comedy-drama film directed by Marcus Harrison and starring Florence Vidor.

== Plot ==
As described in a film magazine, Anne Clegg (Vidor) has been raised in seclusion of a cabin the mountains by her uncle, a former school teacher. Monte Collins (Calhern), a man of means and popular with the women of his set, visits his friend in the mountains. His airplane crashes near the cabin, and during his convalescence he falls in love with Anne and the two are married. Back in civilization, their marriage is a happy one until Monte tires of evenings spend home at the fireside, and he seeks recreation among his friends at the cabaret. Thereupon his wife, to teach him a lesson, takes a dancing course and acquires a lot of new gowns. With the aid of Henry Mortimer (Meredith), an old time friend and former suitor, who escorts her to a series of parties and affairs, she teaches her husband a lesson as Monte is much distracted. This comes to a climax when Henry and Anne are returning from an island excursion and the boat goes dead at sea, forcing them to remain there overnight. Monte becomes desperate and attempts to kill Henry, but Anne comes between them and falsely claims to love Henry. Later, after Monte learns the truth of what happened, he returns home only to discover that his wife has left. Surmising that she has probably gone back to the cabin in the mountains, he uses his airplane to beat her there. Here they both admit to having learned their lessons and are reconciled.

== Cast ==
- Florence Vidor as Anne Clegg
- Charles Meredith as Henry Mortimer
- Louis Calhern as Monte Collins
