= The Perfect Woman (1920 film) =

1920 film directed by David Kirkland

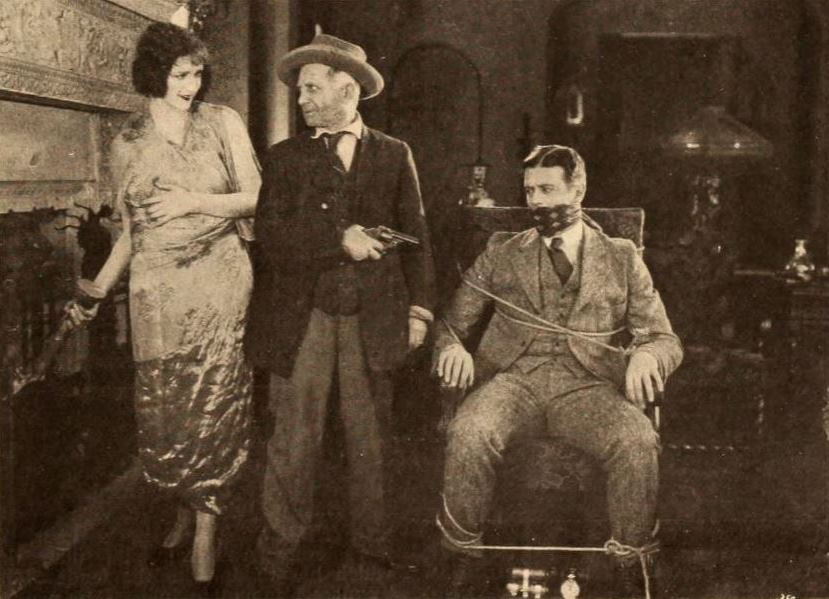
- Film still
- Directed by: David Kirkland
- Written by: John Emerson; Anita Loos
- Produced by: Joseph M. Schenck
- Starring: Constance Talmadge; Charles Meredith; Elizabeth Garrison
- Cinematography: Oliver T. Marsh
- Production company: Joseph M. Schenck Productions
- Distributed by: First National Pictures
- Release date: July 1920
- Running time: 60 minutes
- Country: United States
- Language: Silent (English intertitles)

The Perfect Woman is a 1920 American silent comedy film directed by David Kirkland and starring Constance Talmadge, Charles Meredith, and Elizabeth Garrison. It was preserved by the Academy Film Archive in 2017.

== Cast ==
- Constance Talmadge as Mary Blake
- Charles Meredith as James Stanhope
- Elizabeth Garrison as Mrs. Stanhope
- Joseph Burke as J.J. Simmons
- Ned Sparks as Grimes, the Anarchist

== Bibliography ==
- Donald W. McCaffrey & Christopher P. Jacobs. Guide to the Silent Years of American Cinema. Greenwood Publishing, 1999. ISBN 0-313-30345-2
