= Noose for a Gunman =

1960 film by Edward L. Cahn

- Theatrical release poster
- Directed by: Edward L. Cahn
- Screenplay by: James B. Gordon
- Story by: Steve Fisher
- Produced by: Robert E. Kent
- Starring: Jim Davis; Barton MacLane
- Cinematography: Walter Strenge
- Edited by: Grant Whytock
- Music by: Paul Sawtell; Bert Shefter
- Color process: Black and white
- Production company: Premium Pictures
- Distributed by: United Artists
- Release dates: April 13, 1960 (Los Angeles); May 1, 1960 (United States)
- Running time: 69 minutes
- Country: United States
- Language: English

Noose for a Gunman is a 1960 American Western film directed by Edward L. Cahn and starring Jim Davis and Barton MacLane. The film was a remake of Steve Fisher's Top Gun (1955) then was later remade as The Quick Gun.

== Plot ==
Though wanted for murder, gunslinger Case Britton returns home to Rock Valley when he learns that the stagecoach carrying his fiancée is being targeted by bandit Jack Cantrell in this suspenseful Western.

== Cast ==
- Jim Davis as Case Britton
- Barton MacLane as Carl Avery
- Lyn Thomas as Della Haines
- Ted de Corsia as Cantrell
- Leo Gordon as Link Roy
- Harry Carey Jr. as Jim Ferguson
- Walter Sande as Tom Evans
- William Tannen as Willetts
- William Challee as Gorse
- Robert Tetrick as Anders

== See also ==
- List of American films of 1960
