= All Wrong (film) =

1919 film by Raymond B. West

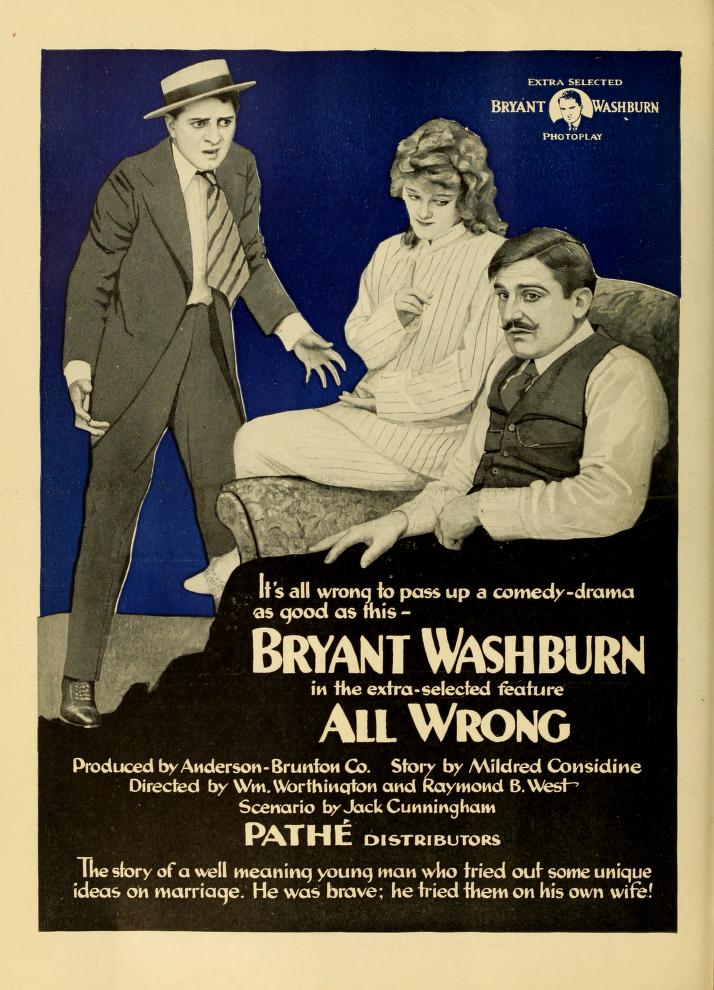
- Directed by: Raymond B. West; William Worthington
- Release date: June 1, 1919
- Running time: 50 minutes
- Country: United States
- Language: Silent with English intertitles

All Wrong is an American silent comedy film released on June 1, 1919. The film was directed by Raymond B. West and William Worthington, to a script by Mildred Considine and Jack Cunningham. The film starred Bryant Washburn, but was the breakthrough role for Mildred Davis. A print of All Wrong exists.

== Cast ==
- Bryant Washburn as Warren Kent
- Mildred Davis as Betty Thompson
- Charles Bennett as Donald Thompson
- Helen Dunbar as Mrs. Donald Thompson
- Fred Montague as Randolph Graham
- Margaret Livingston as Ethel Goodwin
