= The Beloved Vagabond =

The Beloved Vagabond may refer to:

- The Beloved Vagabond (novel), a 1906 British novel by William John Locke
- The Beloved Vagabond (play), a 1908 play adapted from the novel
- The Beloved Vagabond (1915 film), an American film
- The Beloved Vagabond (1923 film), a British film
- The Beloved Vagabond (1936 film), a British film
