= The Morals of Marcus Ordeyne =

The Morals of Marcus Ordeyne or The Morals of Marcus may refer to:

- The Morals of Marcus Ordeyne (novel), a 1905 novel by William John Locke, later developed into a play
  - Morals (film), a 1921 film adaptation
  - The Morals of Marcus (1915 film), a lost American silent comedy-drama film, based on the novel
  - The Morals of Marcus (1935 film), a British comedy film, based on the novel
