= Florence Deshon =

American actress (1893–1922)

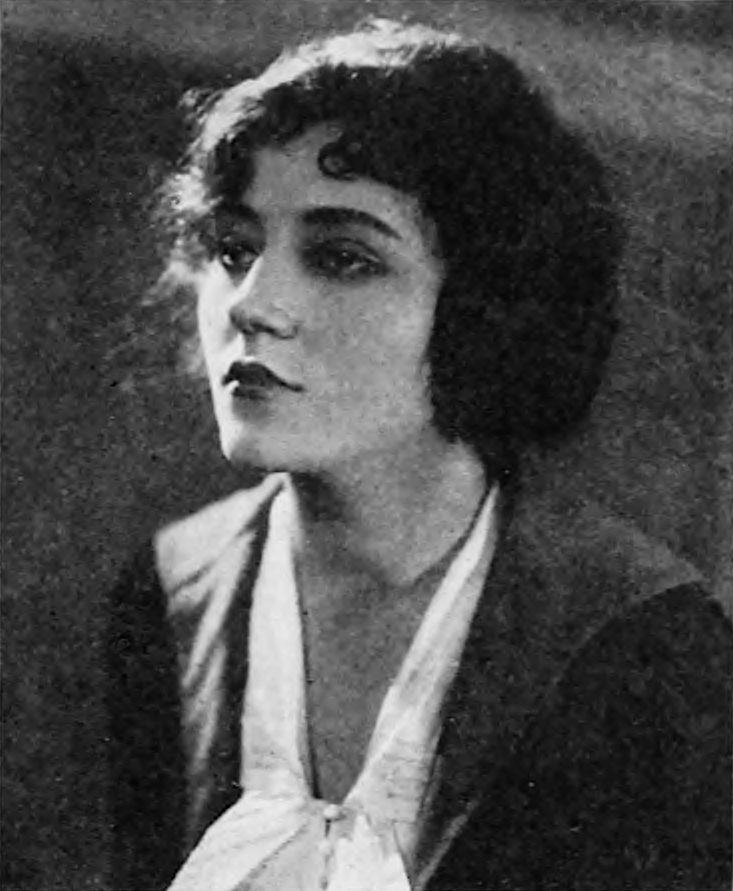
- Deshon in 1920
- Born: Florence Danks; July 19, 1893; Tacoma, Washington, U.S.
- Died: February 4, 1922 (aged 28); New York City, New York, U.S.
- Cause of death: Inert gas asphyxiation
- Other name: Florence Deschon

Florence Deshon (born Florence Danks; July 19, 1893 – February 4, 1922) was an American motion picture actress in silent films. Born in Tacoma, Washington, Deshon began her film career in 1915, appearing in The Beloved Vagabond, and would later star in numerous pictures for Samuel Goldwyn and Vitagraph Studios between 1918 and 1921. She was romantically involved with writer Max Eastman and actor Charlie Chaplin. Deshon died of gas asphyxiation in her New York City apartment.

== Early life ==
Florence Deshon was born Florence Danks in Tacoma, Washington, to Samuel Danks, a musician and union organizer from Wales, and Flora Caroline Spatzer, a pianist of Austro-Hungarian descent. She lived in Washington with her parents and older brother, Walter, until the family moved to New York City around 1900, as her parents pursued musical careers.

In 1913, she became acquainted with writer Max Eastman in Greenwich Village, and the two became romantically involved.

== Career ==
Deshon appeared in more than twenty silent films, beginning in 1915 with The Beloved Vagabond. In 1919, while living in New York, she was summoned by Samuel Goldwyn to Los Angeles, California, and offered her work in his studio. Charlie Chaplin, who became her lover, gave her a cameo role in his film A Day’s Pleasure (1919) but cut the scene from the final release.

Deshon played in features for Vitagraph Studios until 1921. Her final film credit was in the role of Sally McTurk in The Roof Tree, directed by John Francis Dillon. She returned to New York City with her mother in December 1921, hoping to continue her work in films there.

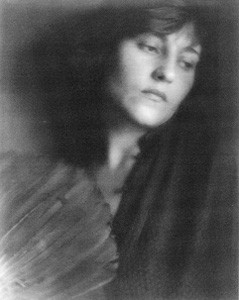
Margrethe Mather, Florence Deshon, 1921, bromide print. J. Paul Getty Museum

== Personal life ==
In addition to her relationship with Eastman, Deshon had a romantic relationship with Charlie Chaplin while living in Los Angeles and purportedly “commuted from coast to coast” between the two men. By 1920 she was pregnant by Chaplin, but at three months into her pregnancy she suffered a miscarriage. She went back to New York and underwent surgery to prevent septicemia. By late 1921 she had lost everything she had: Chaplin had left her, Eastman had a new lover, and her Hollywood contract was not renewed. She became depressed and fell into despair.

== Death ==
On February 4, 1922, Deshon was found unconscious on the third floor of her apartment building at 120 West Eleventh Street. A window was open in her bedroom, but illuminating gas flowed from an opened jet. A newspaperwoman, Minnie Morris, found Deshon when she returned to the building. An ambulance took Deshon to St. Vincent's Hospital, but attempts to revive her were unsuccessful. She died the following afternoon, aged 28. Deshon's apartment had been subleased from Doris Stevens, who was married to Dudley Field Malone. The couple were honeymooning in Europe at the time of the actress' death. She died five days after William Desmond Taylor, who overshadowed her.

A medical examiner concluded Deshon's death was accidental. However, rumors persisted among her circle of friends and acquaintances that she might have committed suicide, and several biographers, including Ross Wetzsteon and Christoph Irmscher, have described her death as such. An unsubstantiated comment from a neighbor had it that she had recently argued with a person who came to her apartment. Having recently broken off their relationship, Eastman claimed that Deshon had no reason to kill herself and that her death was accidental; he had come across her on the street on the afternoon before her death when they spoke briefly before going their separate ways. That evening, Eastman heard that she had been rushed to hospital whilst he was watching a theatre performance. He went to St. Vincent's and gave blood, but the attempt to revive Deshon was futile.

== Filmography ==
Year	Title	Role	Other notes	Ref.
1915	The Beloved Vagabond		Lost film	
1916	The Ruling Passion	Blanche Walcott	Lost film	
1916	Jaffery	Liosha	Lost film	
1917	The Judgment House	Al'Mah	Lost film	
1917	The Auction Block	Lilas Lynn	Lost film	
1918	The Other Man	Lucia Stedman	Lost film	
1918	The Desired Woman	Irene Mitchell	Lost film	
1918	A Bachelor's Children	Mrs. Beaumont	Lost film	
1918	Just a Woman	—N/a	Lost film	
1918	The Golden Goal	Beatrice Walton	Lost film	
1918	One Thousand Dollars	Lotta Lauriere	Lost film	
1918	Love Watches	Lucia de Morfontaine	Lost film	
1918	The Clutch of Circumstance	Lory Williams	Lost film	
1919	The Cambric Mask	Mrs. Lanark	Lost film	
1919	The Loves of Letty	Mrs. Allardyce		
1920	The Cup of Fury	Polly Widdicombe	Lost film	
1920	Duds	Marquise	Lost film	
1920	Dangerous Days	Marion Hayden	Lost film	
1920	Twins of Suffering Creek	Jess Jones	Lost film	
1920	Dollars and Sense	Daisy	Lost film	
1920	Curtain	Lila Grant	Lost film	
1920	Deep Waters	Kate Leroy	Lost film	
1921	The Roof Tree	Sally McTurk	Lost film	

== See also ==
- List of unsolved deaths

== Works cited ==
- Warren, Beth Gates (2011). Artful Lives: Edward Weston, Margrethe Mather, and the Bohemians of Los Angeles. Getty Publications. ISBN 978-1-606-06070-4.
- Wetzsteon, Ross (2007). Republic of Dreams: Greenwich Village: The American Bohemia, 1910–1960. Simon and Schuster. ISBN 978-1-416-58951-8.
