= The Beloved Vagabond (1915 film) =

1915 film

- Directed by: Edward José
- Written by: George B. Seitz
- Based on: The Beloved Vagabond by William John Locke
- Starring: Edwin Arden
- Music by: Darius Milhaud
- Production company: Pathé Exchange (as Gold Rooster Plays)
- Distributed by: Pathé Exchange
- Release date: December 17, 1915
- Running time: Six reels
- Country: United States
- Languages: Silent (English intertitles)

The Beloved Vagabond is a 1915 romantic drama film directed by Edward José and starring Edwin Arden. Originally, prints of the film were hand-colored. Darius Milhaud wrote the music to be played with this silent film.

The film is based on the 1906 novel The Beloved Vagabond by William John Locke. Two other film versions were made The Beloved Vagabond in 1923 and The Beloved Vagabond in 1936.

== Plot ==
The wealthy Gaston de Nerac (Arden) decides to live as a tramp until he falls in love.

== Cast ==
- Edwin Arden - Gaston de Nerac / Paragot
- Kathryn Brown-Decker - Joanna Rushworth
- Bliss Milford - Blanquette
- Doc Crane - Asticot
- Mathilde Brundage
- Florence Deshon
