= Edwin Arden =

American actor (1864–1918)

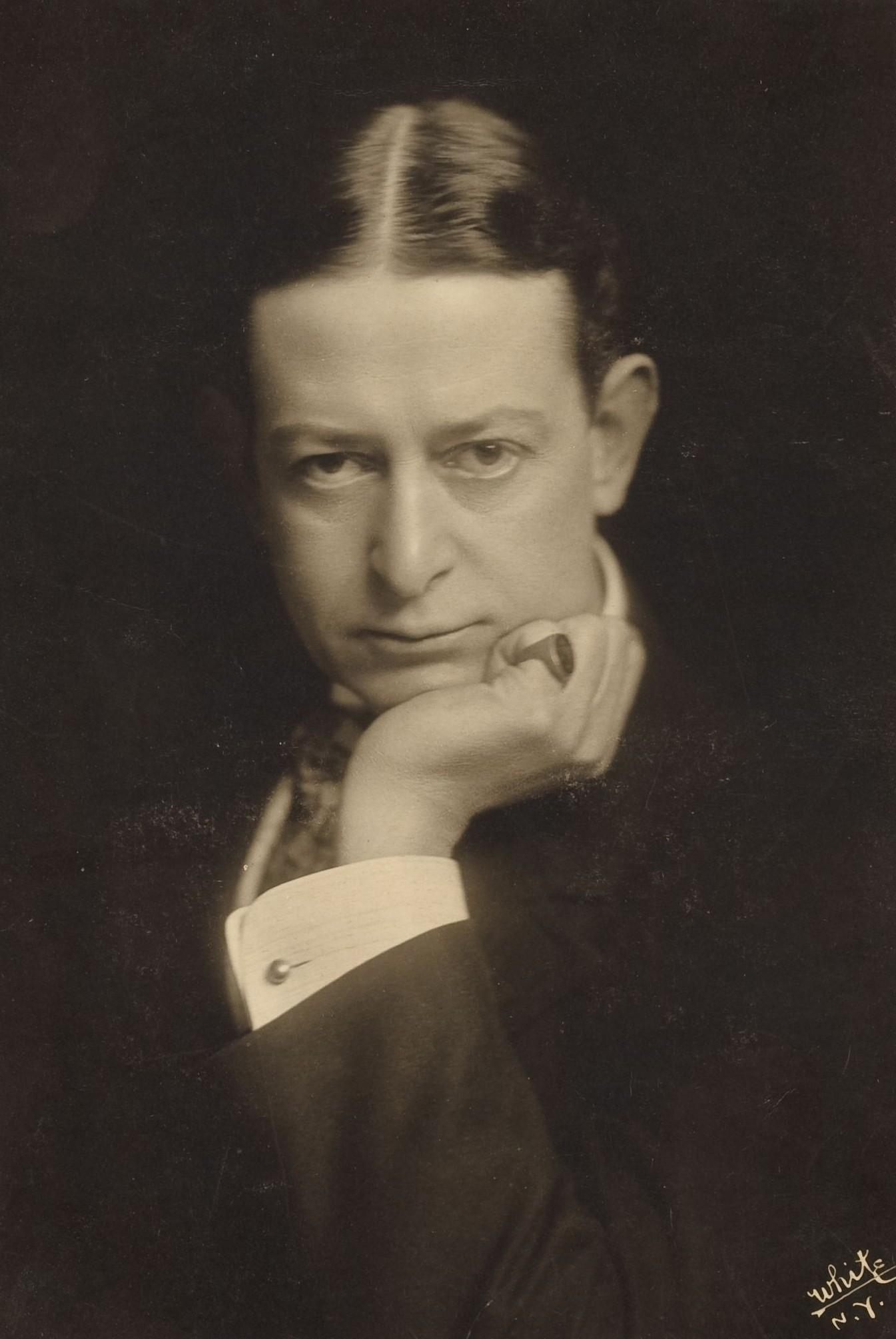
- Born: Edwin Hunter Pendleton Arden; February 4, 1864; St. Louis, Missouri, U.S.
- Died: October 2, 1918 (aged 54); New York City, New York, U.S.
- Occupations: Stage actor, manager and playwright

Edwin Hunter Pendleton Arden (February 4, 1864 – October 2, 1918) was an American actor, theatre manager, and playwright.

== Biography ==
Arden was born in St. Louis, Missouri, to Mary Berkley Hunter and Arden Richard Smith. After a common-school education he travelled west and worked in a number of different jobs, including as a mine-helper, cowboy, railroad brakeman, clerk, reporter, and theatre manager. In 1882, he made his debut as an actor with Thomas W. Keene's Shakespeare company. The next year, he married Keene's daughter Agnes Eagleson Keene. Their only child, daughter Mildred Arden, also became an actor. Around this time, he wrote several plays, including The Eagle's Nest, Raglan's Way, Barred Out, and Zorah.

He worked with a number of theatrical companies over the next thirty years, performing in such works as Edmond Rostand's L'Aiglon, Victorien Sardou's Fédora, and in an all-star production of Romeo and Juliet at the Knickerbocker Theatre in New York. In his later years, he had his own stock theatre company in Washington, D.C. He starred in silent films such as The Beloved Vagabond (1915).

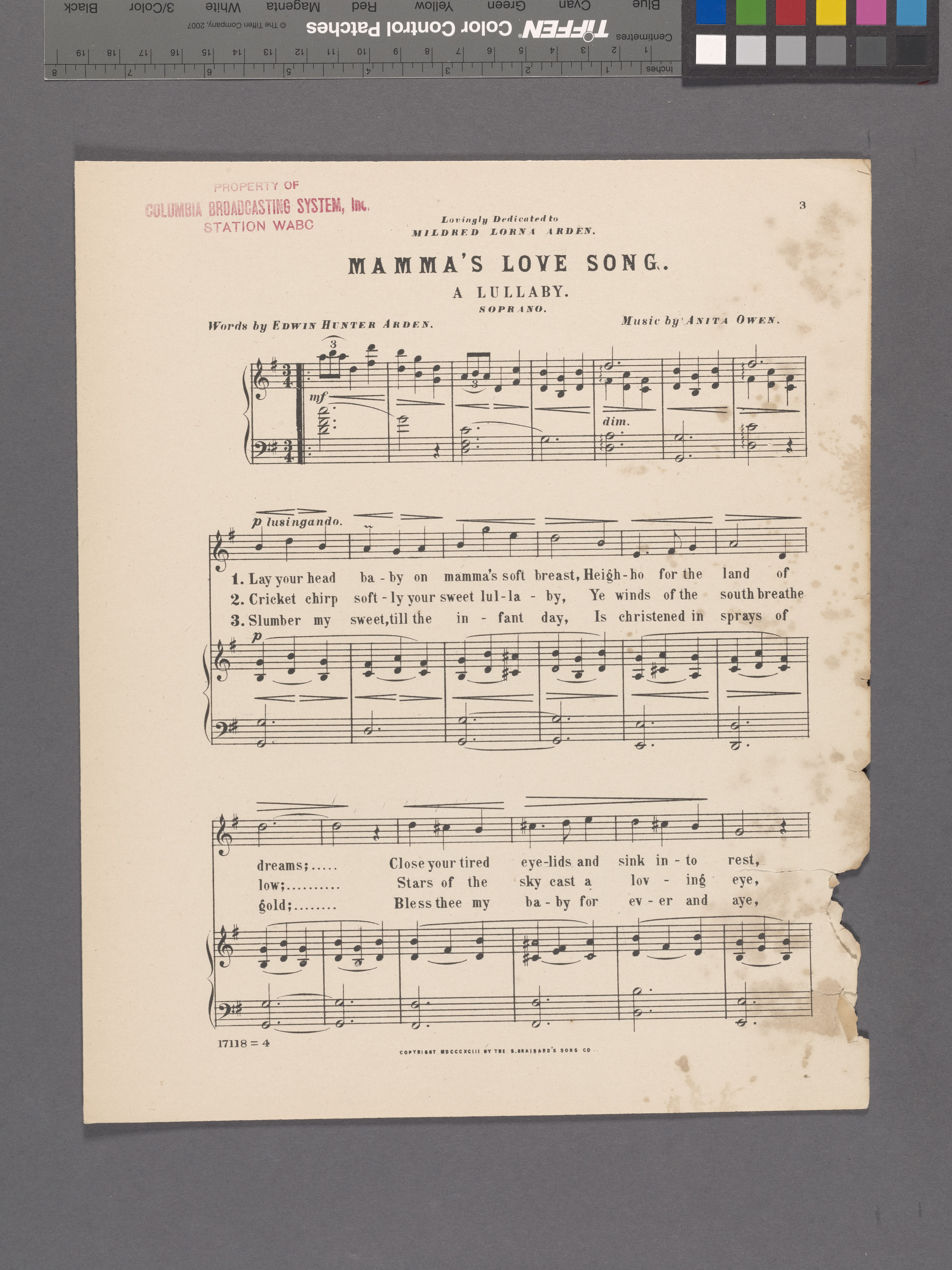
Mamma's love song, Lyrics by Edwin Hunter Arden and dedicated to his daughter Mildred Lorna Arden

== Partial filmography ==
- The Exploits of Elaine (1914)
- The New Exploits of Elaine (1915)
- The Beloved Vagabond (1915)
- The Iron Heart (1917)
- Ruling Passions (1918)
- Virtuous Wives (1918)
