= The Morals of Marcus Ordeyne (novel) =

1905 novel

- 1952 edition
- Author: William John Locke
- Language: English
- Genre: Adventure
- Publication date: 1905
- Media type: Print

The Morals of Marcus Ordeyne is a 1905 British novel written by William John Locke. Along with his next book, The Beloved Vagabond, it was a major success.

In the novel, a schoolmaster becomes the unexpected heir to a noble title and the associated wealth. He takes under his protection a female refugee from Syria.

== Plot summary ==
A middle aged schoolmaster unexpectedly inherits money and a title. Walking through a park he finds a young girl weeping - she is a harem girl who has been abandoned by her would-be lover after escaping from Syria. Not knowing what else to do, Sir Marcus brings her to his home.

== Adaptations ==
In 1907, the novel was adapted by Locke into a play. In 1915, the first silent version, The Morals of Marcus, was made with Marie Doro who starred in the 1907 play. In 1921, another silent film, Morals, was made. In 1935, Miles Mander directed a sound version of The Morals of Marcus, with Ian Hunter in the title role.

== Bibliography ==
- Elwin, Malcolm. Old Gods Falling. Collins, 1939.
- Munden, Kenneth White. American Film Institute Catalog: Feature Films 1921-1930. University of California Press, 1971.
- The Morals of Marcus Ordeyne public domain audiobook at LibriVox
