= The Glory of Clementina Wing =

1911 novel

- Author: William John Locke
- Language: English
- Genre: Drama
- Publisher: The Bodley Head; John Lane (US)
- Publication date: 1911
- Publication place: United Kingdom
- Media type: Print

The Glory of Clementina Wing is a 1911 novel by the British writer William John Locke. In the United States, it was published under the shorter title The Glory of Clementina.

== Adaptations ==
It was adapted twice for the screen, both times in the silent era. A 1915 American short version The Glory of Clementina was followed by a 1922 American feature The Glory of Clementina directed by Emile Chautard and starring Pauline Frederick, Edward Martindel and George Cowl.

== Bibliography ==
- Goble, Alan. The Complete Index to Literary Sources in Film. Walter de Gruyter, 1999.
- Phels, William Lyon. The Advance of the English novel. Dodd, Mead & Company, 1916.
