= Pettigrew's Girl =

1919 film

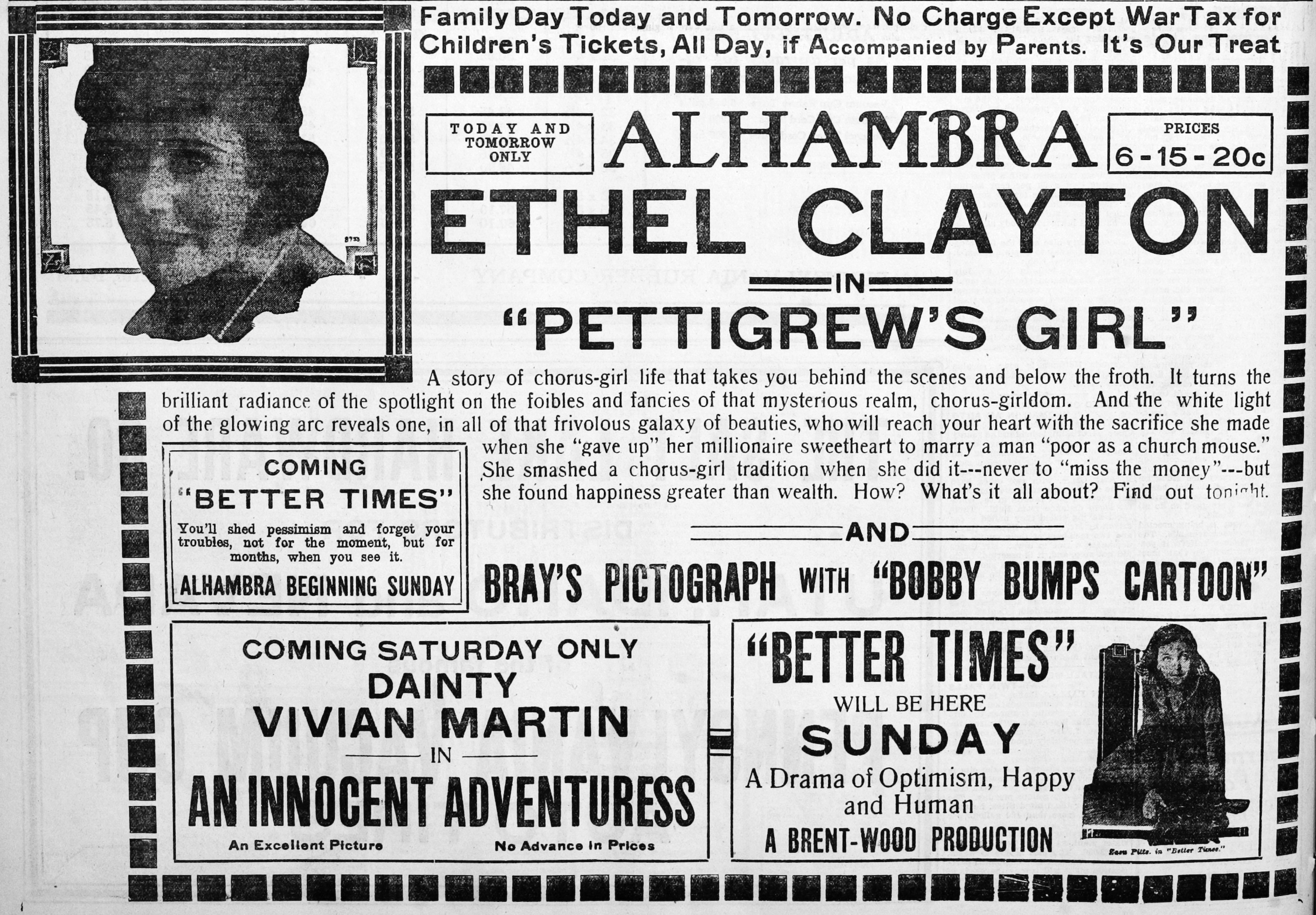
- Directed by: George Melford; Louis A. Howland (assistant)
- Written by: Will M. Ritchey
- Based on: short story Private Pettigrew's Girl, by Dana Burnett c.1918
- Produced by: Adolph Zukor; Jesse Lasky
- Starring: Ethel Clayton; Monte Blue
- Cinematography: Paul P. Perry
- Distributed by: Paramount Pictures
- Release date: March 23, 1919
- Running time: 5 reels
- Country: USA
- Language: Silent with English titles

Pettigrew's Girl is a lost 1919 silent film drama directed by George Melford and starring Ethel Clayton. It was produced by Famous Players–Lasky with distribution through Paramount Pictures.

== Cast ==
- Ethel Clayton - Daisy Heath
- Monte Blue - Private William Pettigrew
- James "Jim" Mason - Private Jiggers Botley
- Charles K. Gerrard - Hugh Varick
- Clara Whipple - Piggy
