= The Heart of a Hero =

1916 film by Emile Chautard, George Archainbaud

- Directed by: Émile Chautard; George Archainbaud (ass't director); M.N. Litson (ass't director)
- Written by: Frances Marion
- Based on: the play Nathan Hale by Clyde Fitch
- Produced by: World Film Corporation; William A. Brady
- Starring: Robert Warwick; Gail Kane
- Cinematography: Lucien Tainguy (it)
- Distributed by: World Film Corporation
- Release date: November 6, 1916
- Running time: six reels
- Country: United States
- Language: Silent..English titles

The Heart of a Hero is a surviving 1916 American silent historical drama film based upon the 1898 play Nathan Hale by Clyde Fitch, directed by Émile Chautard and starring Robert Warwick and Gail Kane. It was produced and distributed by World Film Corporation.

Prints exist at the George Eastman Museum and the Library of Congress.

== Plot ==
The story of Nathan Hale, an American soldier and spy from his days as a teacher to his eventual capture and execution.

== Cast ==
- Robert Warwick - Nathan Hale
- Gail Kane - Alice Adams
- Alec B. Francis - Colonel Knowlton
- George MacQuarrie - Guy Fitzroy
- Clifford Grey - Tom Adams
- Henry West - Cunningham
- Charles Jackson - Thomas Jefferson
- Clara Whipple - Widow Chichester
- Mildred Havens - Amy Brandon
- Herbert Evans - William Howe

== See also ==
- Cardigan (1922)
- America (1924)
- List of films about the American Revolution
- List of television series and miniseries about the American Revolution
