= Clara Whipple =

American actress

Clara Brimmer Whipple
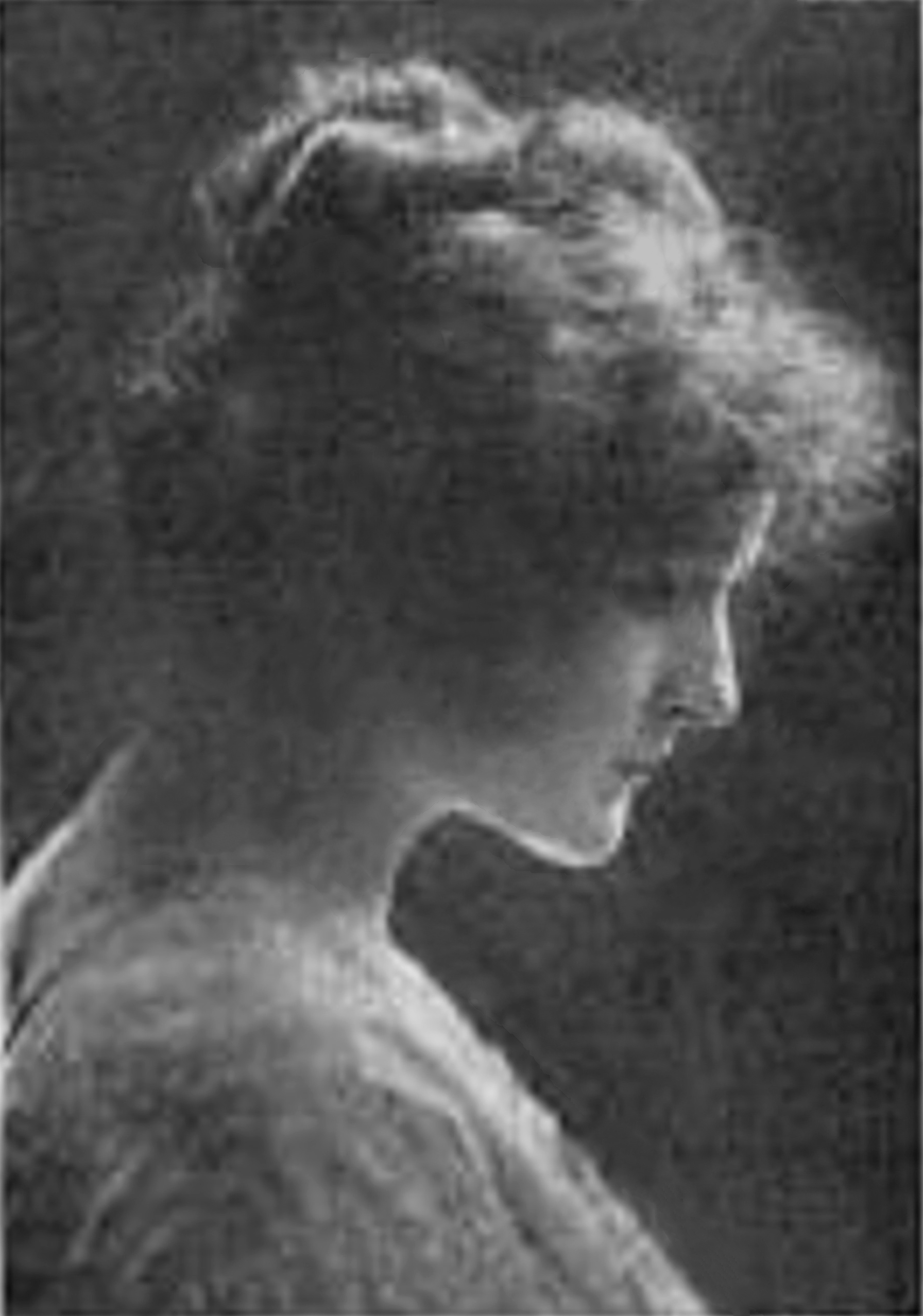
- Clara Whipple in 1908
- Born: Clarissa Brimmer Whipple; November 7, 1887; Saint Louis, Missouri, U.S.
- Died: November 6, 1932 (aged 44); Manhattan, New York City, U.S.
- Other name: Clara Whipple Young
- Occupations: Actress scenario writer
- Years active: 1912–1919
- Era: Silent film
- Employer(s): Stage; Pitt Theatre, Pittsburgh; Silent film Connes-Till Film Company Equitable Motion Picture Corporation Triumph Film Corporation; World Film Corporation
- Known for: The Reapers (1916), leading role
- Spouse(s): James Young (1919–1921); Charles J. Dewey (1928–1932)

Clara Whipple (née Clara or Clarissa or Clarise Brimmer Whipple; November 7, 1887 – November 6, 1932) was an American actress who flourished in theatre from 1913 to 1915 and in silent film from 1915 to 1919. She was also a silent film scenario writer.

== Early years ==
Whipple was born in Saint Louis. Sometime before 1910, she attended school in Germany, on the wooded isle of Nönnenwerth, Trier, and Eschweiler. Hildegard zur Bonsen (born 1889; Prussia) of Göttingen was her classmate and friend at all three locations. Whipple's biography states that she was educated at a convent in Germany and a finishing school in Switzerland. A 1915 article in The St. Louis Star stated that Whipple left Saint Louis "early in life to go to a school in Ohio" (Ursuline Convent) and later went to Ladycliff, on the Hudson." The article continued: "She then went to Nonnenwerth, a convent on an island in the Rhine, near Honnef." "Later, she went to Switzerland." "She completed her education in the Women's College at Trier, Germany."

== Career ==
=== Stage ===
From 1913 to 1915, Whipple was a stage actress in Pittsburgh, where her father and mother had been living. Her father, Thomas Hearne Bailey Whipple, was a Westinghouse publicist and advertising executive. Whipple debuted in Pittsburgh in June 1913 with the Harry Davis Players (Note: Harry Davis (1860–1940).) at the Grand Opera House in a production of The Christian, by Hall Caine.

Whipple subsequently joined the Pitt Players, a Pitt Theatre Company stock company, founded in 1913 and managed by William Moore Patch. At its founding, the Pitt Players were billed as "The Most Expensive and Evenly Balanced Stock Company in America." Patch's mission was to offer new and original plays and encourage native and Pittsburgh playwrights.

=== Film ===
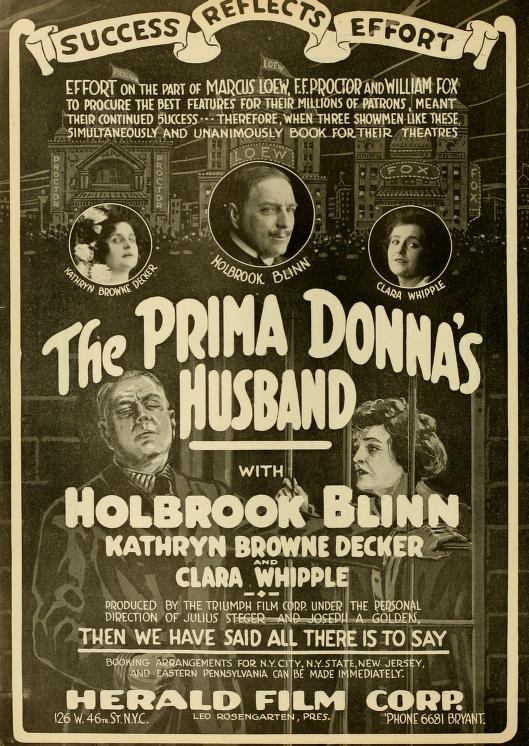
The Prima Donna's Husband poster (1916)

Whipple, from 1915 to 1919, was a silent film actress. She co-starred in the film The Prima Donna's Husband (1916), a crime drama directed by William A. Brady, Julius Steger (es), and Joseph A. Golden (pt). The screenplay was written by Edna Riley, who adapted it from a play by Wildbrandt. The film, five reels, was released by Triumph Films. The film also featured Kathryn Brown Decker (née Browne; 1883–1919) and Holbrook Blinn.

Whipple was the leading lady in The Reapers (1916), starring opposite John B. Mason. The drama exemplified the biblical truth, "As ye sow, so shall ye reap," from the Old Testament. The movie instructs about a high moral truth without preaching. Whipple was cast with Willard Mack and Gerda Holmes (née Gerda Helen Elfrida Henius; 1891–1943) in His One Big Chance (1916), directed by John Ince.

The Heart of a Hero (1916) was adapted from the Clyde Fitch play entitled Nathan Hale. Robert Warwick played Hale, and Gail Kane performed the role of Alice Adams, his girlfriend. The theme of the American Revolution was made more true-to-life with the inclusion of Charles Jackson as Thomas Jefferson. Whipple played the Widow Chichester.

Whipple, Decker, and Blinn teamed again to make a powerful photodrama, Would You Forgive (1919). In Pettigrew's Girl (1919), her last film, she portrays Piggy, a chorus girl friend of the heroine, Daisy Heath. The leading lady was Ethel Clayton.

== Family ==
=== Parents ===
Clara Brimmer Whipple was born November 7, 1887, in Saint Louis, Missouri, to the marriage of Thomas Hearne Bailey Whipple (1858–1942) and Frances (Fanny) Bell Mitchell (maiden; 1868–1941), who married January 25, 1887, in Columbia, Tennessee. Clara Whipple lived with her parents in Cleveland in 1900 and Pittsburgh in 1910. In Pittsburgh, T.H.B. Whipple had, for about 30 years, been a publicist with Westinghouse. In 1926, he became an instructor of business communication at Duquesne University. Clara's parents, T.H.B. and Frances, separated in 1907. T.H.B. filed for divorce in June 1914 in Pittsburgh. Clara's first and middle names are drawn from those of her great-grandmother Clarissa Whipple (née Brimmer; 1783–1835) and her aunt, Clarissa Brimmer Whipple (1850–1914), who was twice married, first on February 6, 1881, in Manhattan, New York, to Frederick H. Prentiss (born 1856) (divorced between 1897 and 1900), then on March 2, 1900, in Pittsburgh to Burcham Harding (1852–1930).

Clara Whipple's father, T.H.B. Whipple, remarried May 4, 1923, to Laura Evangeline Williamson (maiden; 1884–1978). From that marriage, Clara gained a half-sister, Frances Jane Whipple (born 1925), who in 1943 married Joseph John Kerchner (1920–2000).

=== Marriages ===
On April 10, 1919, Whipple married motion picture director James Young Jr. at the Mission Inn, Riverside, California. For Young, it was his third of four marriages. Whipple, at the time, was a well-regarded silent film scenario writer. From 1910 to 1917, James Young was married to the movie actress Clara Kimball Young, his second marriage. Clara Whipple retired from the screen after marrying James Young. She returned to movies as Clara Young in 1920, despite objections by Clara Kimball Young concerning the use of the Young name.

Whipple separated from Young in June 1920 and divorced him in October 1921. The couple had a home at 2000 Holly Drive, Los Angeles, California. Young settled money and real estate amounting to $40,000 on Whipple.

In September 1922, Young sought to reverse the annulment with a cross-complaint filed by his attorneys. Depositions mentioned misconduct by Whipple with other men. Jack Pickford, Thomas J. Moore, Texas Guinan, and Doris Pawn were named in Young's preliminary moves. On October 12, 1922, a day before Whipple became entitled to her divorce decree, Young filed a $50,000 slander suit against her. The legal action came in response to Whipple's accusations that Young threatened her, pointed guns at her, and offered her $2,000 to return his Ku Klux Klan membership paper and bundles of correspondence he had received from women. A month later, in early December 1922, James Young became seriously ill of auto-intoxication in December 1922.

Clara Whipple married again, to Charles J. Dewey (born 1883). They were married in Omaha in September 1928.

=== Death ===
Clara Whipple Dewey died November 6, 1932, in Manhattan, New York, a little more than two months after her brother, "Jamie" Whipple (né James Cameron Mitchell Whipple; 1892–1980), became Production Manager for NBC in Chicago. The cause of death was "Carcinoma of the Liver." Her residence at the time of her death was 180 Claremont Avenue, where her brother James lived, in the Morningside Heights neighborhood of Manhattan, less than 2 blocks north of Juilliard's location from 1910 to 1969.

=== Extended family ===
Armide Whipple (née Armide Nana Edith Whipple; 1920–2001) – Clara Whipple's niece, daughter of Jamie Whipple and Armide Whipple (née Armide Ana Cecile Marie Ayraud; 1901–1976) – was a jazz and big band vocalist with the orchestras of Jimmie Grier (né James Wilford Grier; 1902–1959), Chico Marx, Les Brown, and Ben Pollack. She sang under the stagename "Kim Kimberly." She was briefly married to big band trumpeter Bobby Clark (né Robert Charles Clark Jr.; 1916–1981) from about 1939 to about 1943.

== Other litigation ==
Adelbert George Volck, who worked in the film industry, rented Whipple's Holly Drive home. In September 1923, she sued Volck, charging him with damaging household furnishings, particularly her tapestries and draperies. The court had to decide whether the tapestries and draperies were imported and, therefore, valuable, as Whipple contended.

Whipple filed suit for the collection of a promissory note from motion picture producer Dale Hanshaw (Note: Dale Hanshaw (né Richard Lansdale Hinshaw; 1896–1938) was a son of Harry Hanshaw (1866–1944), who was an uncle of Annette Hanshaw, a jazz vocalist. Lansdale Hanshaw was married and divorced, 1917 to 1923 with Jane Loring, briefly married with actress Lucile Dorrington, and, 1928 to 1930 with actress Ethlyne Clair. Lansdale, in the late 1920s, enjoyed popularity as a film director and producer. But after distress from repeated misfortunes following the Crash of 1929, and their inability to recover during the Great Depression – Lansdale and his wife, actress Miriam de Will (1892–1938), carried out a double suicide pact on April 4, 1938, leaving a note and dying of carbon monoxide poisoning in their sedan with their pet terrier.) in October 1925. She asked for $566.50, the same amount she claimed to have advanced Hanshaw, in various sums, around June 18, 1923. At the time of the court action, Hanshaw had only paid $50. He had given Whipple a radio as security, which she sold, and applied the proceeds to the payment of the note. $56 of the amount Whipple requested was for interest.

== Extant productions and works ==
=== As writer ===
1. Bonds of Honor
  Clara Whipple (story)
  Frances Guihan (screenwriter)
  William Worthington (director)
  Haworth Pictures Corporation (production company)
  Robertson-Cole Distributing Corporation (distributor)

=== Stage acting ===
The Harry Davis Players

2. The Christian (1913)
  By Hall Caine
  The Grande Opera House
  (June 1913)
  Pittsburgh
3. Doctour
  The Grand Opera House
  Pittsburgh

The Pitt Players

Double bill (5 & 6)
Frederick Esmelton (director)

5. Sister Beatrice (1913)
  By Maurice Maeterlinck
6. Don (1913)
  By Rudolf Besier
  Pitt Theater (Note: The Pitt Theatre (aka the new Pitt Theatre) was, erected by Thomas Kenyon (1860–1922) in 1912 as the Kenyon Opera House. The name changed in 1913 to the Pitt Theater under the management of William Moore Patch (1887–1930). The theater was located at the corner of Penn Avenue and Seventh Street, Pittsburgh. Operating as the Barry Theater from 1936, the building was demolished 1951 in favor of a parking lot.)
  (opened September 6, 1913)
  Pittsburgh
7. Sauce for the Goose (1913)
  Pitt Theater
  William Moore Patch (1887–1930)
  Managing director of the theatre
  Pittsburgh
  (opened December 1, 1913)

Other productions

7. The Dragon's Claw (1913–1914)
  Henry Miller
  Pittsburgh
8. The Dragon's Claw (1913)
  By Austin Strong (1881–1952)
  (son of artist American artist Joseph Dwight Strong)
  New Amsterdam Theatre
  Manhattan
  (opened September 14, 1913)

=== Silent film acting ===
Mutual Film Corporation

9. Our Mutual Girl (serial) (1914)
  1. Chapter 34: "Lily's Mother"
  2. Chapter 35: "The Baby's Mother"
  3. Chapter 37: "The Baby's Mother"
  By Carolyn Wells
  (released September 14, 1914)

Connes-Till Film Company, Toronto
B C Feature Film Company (distributor)
George Brownridge (general manager)

10. The Faithful Servant (1915)
  Paul Bern (writer)
11. The Moreland Mystery (1915)
  Paul Bern (writer)
12. A Soul's Affinity (1915)
  Paul Bern (writer)
13. His Awakening (1915)
  Tom McKnight (director)
  Paul Bern (writer)
14. Motto on the Wall (1915)
  Paul Bern (writer)
15. The Better Man (1915)
  Paul Bern (writer)
16. Canada in Peace and War (1915)
  Paul Bern (writer)
17. On the King's Highway (1915) (Note: The Connes-Till Film Company was founded in 1914 at the initiative of Edward H. Robbins, who was born in Philadelphia)
  Paul Bern (writer)

Equitable Motion Picture Corporation (production company)

18. The Fisher Girl (1915); aka The Daughter of the Sea
  Charles M. Seay (director)
  (released November 22, 1915)
  (this film was Whipple's debut with Equitable)
19. Blue Grass (1915)
  An adaptation of the 1906 play
  By Paul Armstrong (1869–1915)
  Charles M. Seay (director)
  OCLC 913643389
20. The Bludgeon (it) (1915)
  Webster Cullison (it) (director)
  World Film Corporation (distributor)
  (released October 18, 1915)
  OCLC 20759041
21. The Question (1916)
  Harry Handworth (director)
  World Film Corporation (distributor)
  (released February 21, 1916)
22. His One Big Chance (1916)
  John Ince (director)
23. The Man Who Dared God (1917)
  Phillips Smalley & Lois Weber (directors)
  World Film Corporation (distributor)

Other films

24. The Prima Donna's Husband (it) (1916)
  Based on the play by Wildbrandt
  Screen version by Edna Goldsmith Riley (1880–1962) Julius Steger (es) & Joseph A. Golden (pt) (directors)
  Triumph Film Corporation (production company)
  A & W Film Corporation (distributor) (Note: A. & W. Film Corporation was incorporated in New York in 1916 with capital of $10,000. The founding directors were Abraham Press, Ernest V. Reiss, and William G. Keir. ("New Grist of Companies," Motography, Vol. 16, No. 1, July 1, 1916, pg. 44))
25. The Reapers (1916)
  Burton L. King (director)
  Whipple co-starred with John Mason
  Triumph Film Corporation (production company) (Note: Triumph Film Corporation was a subsidiary of the Equitable Motion Picture Corporation; Joseph A. Golden (pt) was president)
  Equitable Motion Pictures Corporation,
  releasing through World Film Corporation
  (released April 3, 1916)
26. Sudden Riches (1916)
  Émile Chautard (director)
  World Film Corporation; Peerless (production company)
  World Film Corporation (distributor)
27. The Revolt (1916)
  Barry O'Neil (it) (director)
  World Film Corporation (production company)
  World Film Corporation (distributor)
28. The Stolen Triumph (it) (1916)
  David H. Thompson (director)
  Scenario by Julius Steger (es) & Maxwell Karger
  Rolfe-Metro Corporation (B.A. Rolfe)
29. The Gilded Cage (1916)
  Harley Knoles (director)
  World Film Corporation (production company)
  World Film Corporation (distributor)
30. The Heart of a Hero (1916)
  Émile Chautard (director)
  Peerless Productions (production company)
  World Film Corporation (distributor)
31. Viviette (1918)
  Walter Edwards (director)
  Famous Players–Lasky Corporation (production company)
  Paramount Pictures
32. Would You Forgive? aka Her Sister's Guilt Alternative (1916)
  H.S. Thomas (director)
  Holbrook Blinn (actor)
  Gilbert Murray (actor)
  Clara Whipple (actress)
  Triumph Film Corporation (production company)
33. Would You Forgive? (1917)
  Julius Steger (es) (producer & director) Holbrook Blinn (actor)
  Clara Whipple (actress)
  Kathryn Brown-Decker (née Browne; 1883–1919)
  Triumph Film Corporation (production company)
34. Will You Be Staying for Supper? (1919)
  Kenneth S. Webb, director
35. Pettigrew's Girl (1919)
  George Melford (director)
  Famous Players–Lasky Corporation (production company)
  Famous Players–Lasky Corporation (distributor)

=== Lost film ===
Equitable Motion Picture Corporation

36. Birth of Character
  Working titles:
  The Making of a Man
  The Transmutation
  Life's Crucible
  By Marc Edmund Jones
  Isadore Bernstein (director)
  William Courtleigh Jr. (lead actor)
  World Film Corporation (distributor)
  (released around August 1915)
  The Birth of Character at the AFI Catalog of Feature Films

== Gallery ==
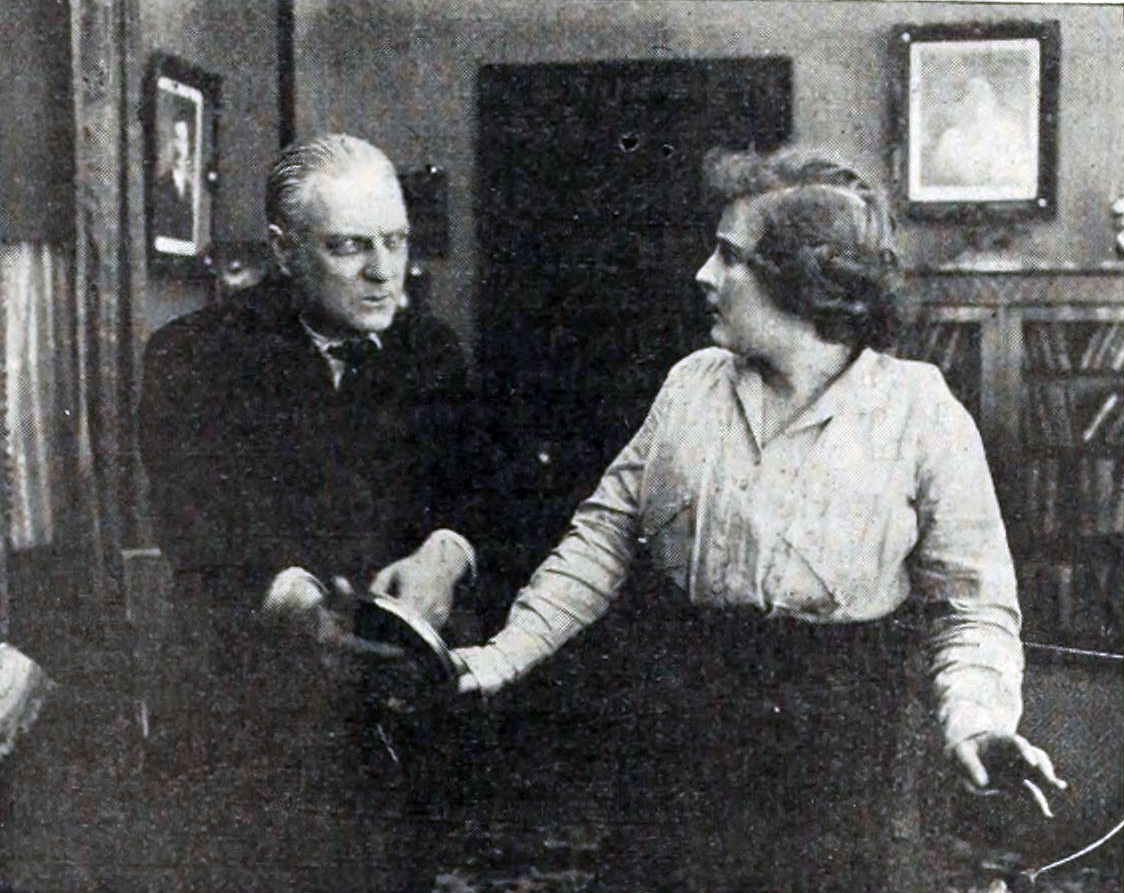
Still of Holbrook Blinn and Clara Whipple from the 1916 film, The Prima Donna's Husband (it)

== Notes and references ==
=== General references ===
- "Clara Whipple" (illustrated), Moving Picture World, Vol. 25, No. 10, September 4, 1915, p. 1657
- "Picture Actresses Want Club," Moving Picture World, Vol. 25, No. 12, September 18, 1915, p. 2003
- "How Clara Whipple Was 'Picked,' " Moving Picture World, Vol. 26, No. 4, October 23, 1915, p. 591
- "Clara Whipple in Ingenue Role," Moving Picture World, Vol. 27, No. 4, January 22, 1916, p. 612
- "World Film Reorganizes," Moving Picture World, Vol. 27, No. 6, February 12, 1916, p. 931
- "World-Equitable Players," Moving Picture World, Vol. 27, No. 7, February 19, 1916, p. 1133
- "Miss Whipple Claims 'Vampire' Record," Moving Picture World, Vol. 27, No. 11, March 18, 1916, p. 1831
- "Film Flashes," Variety, Vol. 42, No. 7, April 14, 2016, p. 22
- "News Notes From Movieland" (Central Press Association syndicated Sunday column), by Daisy Dean (pseudonym), Lima Times Democrat April 19, 1916, p. 4
  Paragraph: "Willard Mack, Gerda Holmes, Clara Whipple ... " (in reference to the 1916 film, His One Big Chance)
  (née Gerda Helen Elfrida Henius; 1891–1943)
  (accessible via Ancestry.com)
- "News Notes From Movieland" (Central Press Association syndicated Sunday column), by Daisy Dean (pseudonym), Racine Journal-News, May 13, 1916, p. 12 (accessible via www.newspapers.com/clip/78522623/)
- "Theatrical Notes". The New York Times. June 7, 1916. p. 11.
- "This Week's Guide For Playgoers". The Washington Post. November 5, 1916. p. MT2.
- "Gossip of Movie-Land". Mansfield News. November 11, 1916. p. 8.
- "James Young to Wed," Moving Picture World, Vol. 40, No. 2, April 12, 1919, p. 218
- "Young–Whipple," Moving Picture World, Vol. 40, No. 4, April 26, 1919, p. 519
- "Palace". Olean Evening Herald. May 24, 1919. p. 4.
- "At The Theatres". La Crosse Tribune and Leader-Press. October 14, 1919. p. 4.
- "Sued for Divorce," Moving Picture World, Vol. 51, No. 8, August 20, 1921, p. 793
