= Cardigan (film) =

1922 film

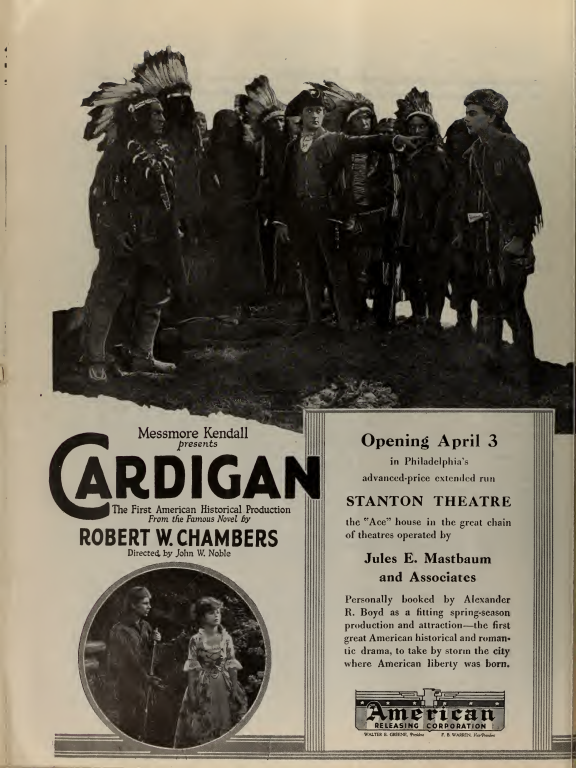
- Advertisement in The Film Daily
- Directed by: John W. Noble
- Written by: Robert W. Chambers (adaptation of his novel)
- Based on: Cardigan by Robert W. Chambers
- Produced by: Messmore Kendall
- Starring: William Collier Jr.
- Cinematography: John S. Stumar; Ned Van Buren; Max Schneider
- Distributed by: American Releasing Corporation
- Release date: February 19, 1922
- Running time: 7 reels
- Country: United States
- Languages: Silent; English intertitles

Cardigan is a lost 1922 American silent war film directed by John W. Noble and starring William Collier Jr. Set in the American Revolutionary War, it was adapted for the screen by Robert William Chambers from his own 1901 novel Cardigan.

== Plot ==
As described in a film magazine, two years before the start of the American Revolutionary War, Michael Cardigan (Collier), a young Irishman who is ward of the English governor, is in love with Felicity Warren (Carpenter), who is known as Silver Heels. Captain Butler (Pike) is also a suitor for her hand. Cardigan is sent to deliver a message to a distant point but is betrayed by Captain Butler, and almost meets death by being burned at the stake for the murder of the children of Chief Logan (Montgomery). A runner saves him and Cardigan is later admitted to the secret councils of the Minutemen. He hears Patrick Henry (Loeffler) utter the words, "Give me liberty or give me death!", and sees John Hancock (Willis) sign the Declaration of Independence "large so that the King may read it." There follows the ride of Paul Revere (Hume) and the Battles of Lexington and Concord and the retreat of the British, which follow with the splendid climax of the film.

== Cast ==
- William Collier Jr. as Michael Cardigan
- Betty Carpenter as Silver Heels
- Thomas Cummings as Sir William Johnson
- William Pike as Captain Butler
- Charles Graham as Lord Dunmore
- Madeleine Lubetty as Marie Hamilton
- Hattie Delaro as Lady Shelton
- Louis Dean as Sir John Johnson
- Colin Campbell as The Weazel
- Jere Austin as Jack Mount
- Frank Montgomery as Chief Logan
- Eleanor Griffith as Dulcina
- Dick Lee as Quider
- J. W. Johnston as Colonel Cresap (credited as Jack Johnston)
- Florence Short as Molly Brandt
- George Loeffler as Patrick Henry
- William Willis as John Hancock
- Austin Hume as Paul Revere

== See also ==
- The Heart of a Hero (1916)
- America (1924)
- List of films about the American Revolution
- List of television series and miniseries about the American Revolution
