= Thomas W. Keene =

American theatre actor (1840–1898)

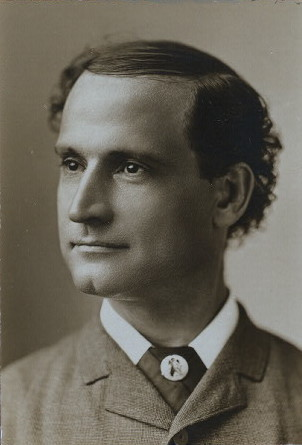
Thomas W. Keene

Thomas R. Eagleson (October 26, 1840 – June 1, 1898), better known by the stage name Thomas Wallace Keene, was an American theatre actor known for his Shakespearean roles which he performed throughout the United States.

== Life and career ==
Thomas R. Eagleson (Note: His middle name is listed only by the initial R. in contemporary and modern biographies such as The National Cyclopaedia of American Biography (1898), Dictionary of American Biography (1933), American National Biography (1999) The A to Z of American Theater (2009) and Historical Dictionary of American Theater (2015), yet is given as "Robert" in Ira K. Morris's Memorial History of Staten Island (1900), the accuracy of which has been questioned in later years.) was born in New York City, the son of Charles and Agnes (née Gamble) Eagleson. His father was employed on the staff of the Courier and Enquirer and died when Thomas was a child.

To aid in the support of his family, Eagleson secured an engagement as a supernumerary at New York's Bowery Theatre. He made his first appearance on the stage as an actor in 1863-64, at Albany, with James H. Hackett in King Henry IV, assuming the stage name Thomas Wallace Keene.

He was married, September 29, 1861, to Margaret A., daughter of Ann and James Creighton. He served as a volunteer in the American Civil War, 1861–65, and after its close joined a stock company in Newark, New Jersey.

He played juvenile parts with leading stars at Wood's theatre, New York City, in 1867. He joined the stock company of the National Theatre, Cincinnati, Ohio, and traveled through the west taking the parts of Macbeth, Hamlet and Richard III, 1869. He played burlesque and melodramatic parts at Wood's Museum, New York city, 1870-74. Between engagements at Wood's Museum in 1870 he made his debut in London, England, in the leading role of Across the Continent, and after a tour of the provinces he returned to Wood's Museum and appeared as Joe Morgan in Ten Nights in a Bar-Room. He supported E. L. Davenport, Charlotte Cushman and Clara Morris, and in 1875 was leading man to John McCullough in California.

In 1876 when Edwin Booth (brother of John Wilkes Booth) played an engagement there Keene alternated the roles of Iago and Othello with Booth, and Cassius, Brutus and Mark Antony with Booth and McCullough, and played Iago to McCullough's Othello and Macduff to his Macbeth. He was sent east with a part of the California stock company to play "Microscope" in Jules Verne's A Trip to the Moon in 1877 and in 1878 went to Ford's Grand Opera House, Baltimore, and starred through the south in Shakespearean plays.

He was engaged by Eugene Tompkins of the Boston Theatre, in 1879, and made a sensation by his acting of Couplan the drunkard in Zola's Drink and also played the leading roles in a number of Shakespearean plays. He starred under the management of William R. Hayden for eight successive seasons (1880–88) in a repertory of Shakespeare's plays. In style he was essentially melodramatic.

A paralytic shock rendered him speechless in 1886, but electrical treatment enabled him to resume his profession. His last appearance was in the character of Richelieu at Hamilton, Ontario, May 23, 1898. He resided in Castleton Corners, Staten Island, for the last 16 years of his life, amassing of library of some 2,600 books as well as costumes, autographs, and other theatre memorabilia. He died at New Brighton, Staten Island, New York, on June 1, 1898, and was buried in Fairview Cemetery, Castleton Corners. His daughter Agnes was married to the actor Edwin Arden.
