= The Glory of Clementina =

1922 film

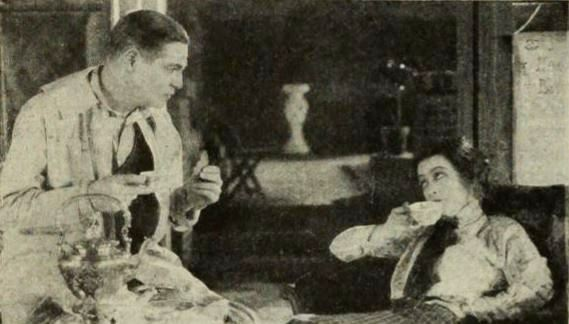
- Directed by: Emile Chautard
- Written by: Winifred Dunn; Richard Schayer
- Based on: The Glory of Clementina Wing by William John Locke
- Starring: Pauline Frederick; Edward Martindel; George Cowl
- Cinematography: Devereaux Jennings
- Production company: Robertson-Cole Pictures Corporation
- Distributed by: Film Booking Offices of America
- Release date: May 28, 1922
- Running time: 60 minutes
- Country: United States
- Languages: Silent; English intertitles

The Glory of Clementina is a 1922 American silent drama film directed by Emile Chautard and starring Pauline Frederick, Edward Martindel and George Cowl. It was the film debut of vaudeville star Louise Dresser. It is based on the 1911 novel The Glory of Clementina Wing by British author William John Locke. It had previously been adapted into a 1915 short film of the same title.

== Cast ==
- Pauline Frederick as Clementina Wing
- Edward Martindel as Quixtus
- George Cowl as Huckaby
- Lincoln Plumer as Billiter
- Edward Hearn as Tommy Burgrave
- Jean Calhoun as Etta Concannon
- Clarence Wilson as Vandemeer
- Louise Dresser as Lena Fontaine
- Helen Stone as Little Sheila
- Lydia Yeamans Titus as Shiela's Maid
- Truly Shattuck as Lady Louise Malling

== Preservation ==
In February of 2021, The Glory of Clementina was cited by the National Film Preservation Board on their Lost U.S. Silent Feature Films list and is therefore presumed lost.

== Bibliography ==
- Munden, Kenneth White. The American Film Institute Catalog of Motion Pictures Produced in the United States, Part 1. University of California Press, 1997.
