= Ruling Passions =

1918 film

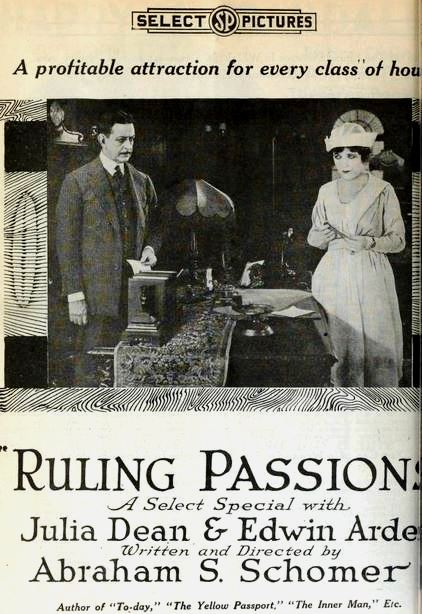
- Advertisement
- Directed by: Abraham S. Schomer
- Written by: Abraham S. Schomer
- Produced by: Schomer Photoplay Producing Company
- Starring: Julia Dean; Edwin Arden; Claire Whitney
- Cinematography: Sol Polito
- Distributed by: State Rights; Select Pictures
- Release date: October 1918
- Running time: 8 reels
- Country: United States
- Language: Silent (English intertitles)

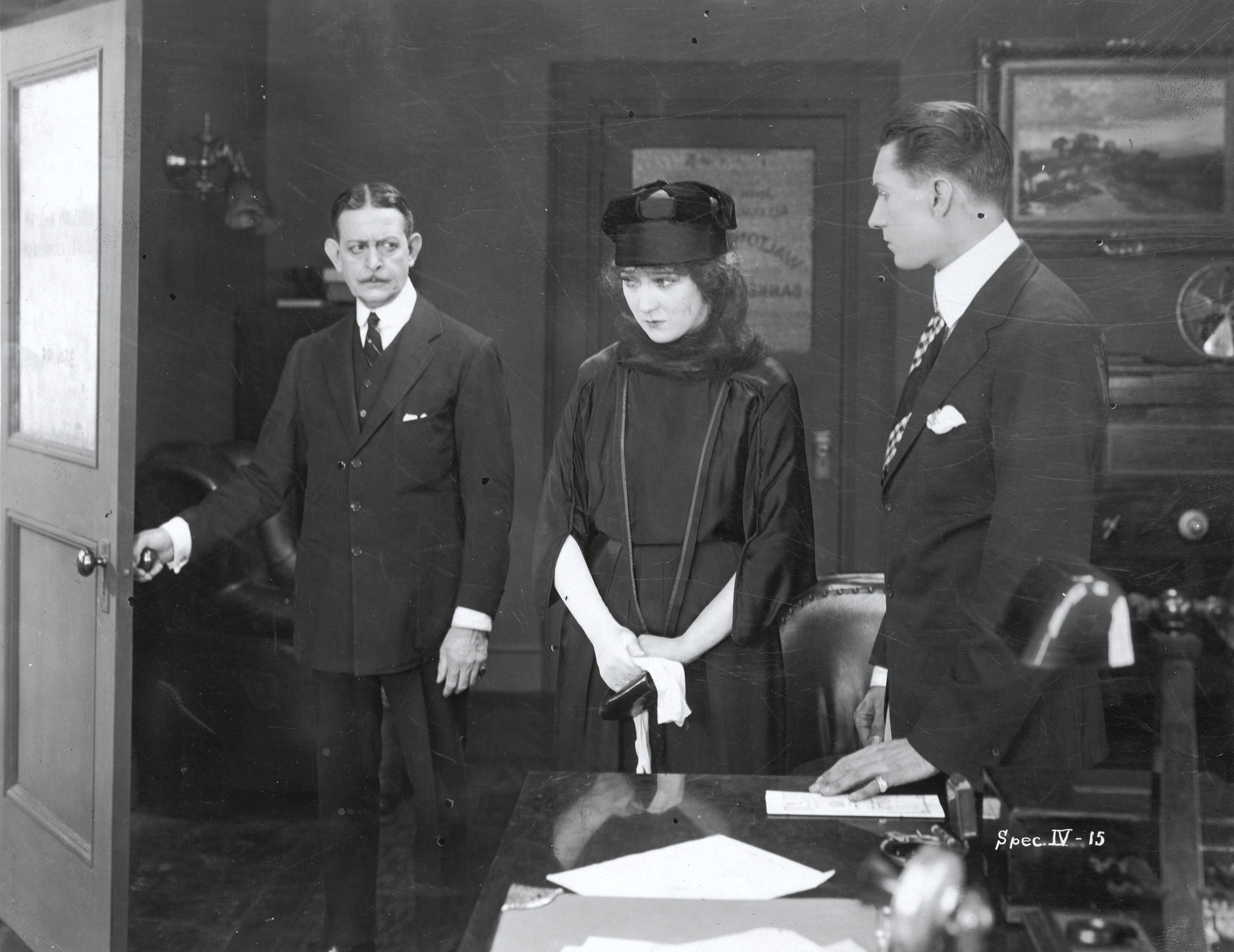
left to right: Edwin Arden, Claire Whitney and Earl Schenck.

Ruling Passions is a lost 1918 American silent drama film produced, written, and directed by Abraham S. Schomer and starring Julia Dean. It was released on State Rights basis.

== Cast ==
- Julia Dean as Eveline Roland
- Edwin Arden as John Walton
- Claire Whitney as Louise Palmer
- Earl Schenck as Alexander Vernon
- Doan Borrup as Lew
