= Viviette =

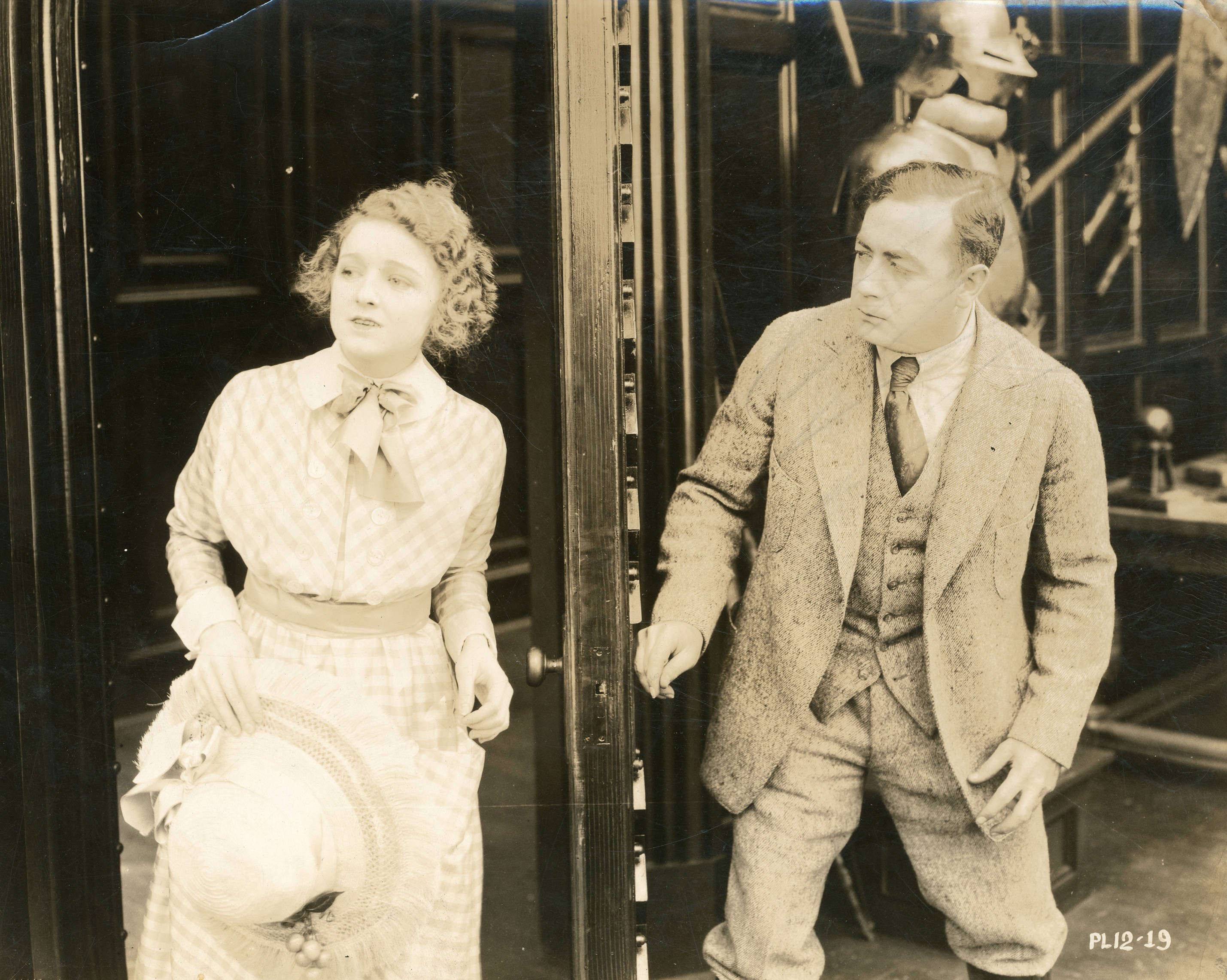
- Directed by: Walter Edwards
- Screenplay by: Julia Crawford Ivers; William J. Locke
- Produced by: Jesse L. Lasky
- Starring: Vivian Martin; Eugene Pallette; Harrison Ford; Kate Toncray; Clara Whipple; Donald Blakemore
- Cinematography: James Van Trees
- Production company: Famous Players–Lasky Corporation
- Distributed by: Paramount Pictures
- Release date: June 9, 1918
- Running time: 50 minutes
- Country: United States
- Language: Silent (English intertitles)

Viviette is a 1918 American silent drama film directed by Walter Edwards, written by Julia Crawford Ivers and William J. Locke, and starring Vivian Martin, Eugene Pallette, Harrison Ford, Kate Toncray, Clara Whipple, and Donald Blakemore. It was released on June 9, 1918, by Paramount Pictures.

== Plot ==
As described in a film magazine, Dick Ware is in love with Viviette, and the arrival of his handsome brother Austin and Viviette's attentiveness to the visitor arouses the jealousy of Dick to such a degree that murder enters his heart. Austin, realizing the depth of Dick's feeling for the charming Viviette, asks Kathryn Holroyd, a widowed friend of Viviette, to marry him. When Dick realizes that his brother is not trying to take Viviette away from him, he is both overjoyed and ashamed. The knowledge that Dick really loves her arouses a responsive chord in Viviette, and happiness reigns over the Ware household.

== Cast ==
- Vivian Martin as Viviette
- Eugene Pallette as Dick Ware
- Harrison Ford as Austin Ware
- Kate Toncray as Mrs. Ware
- Clara Whipple as Kathryn Holroyd
- Donald Blakemore as Lord Banstead

== Reception ==
Like many American films of the time, Viviette was subject to restrictions and cuts by city and state film censorship boards. For example, the Chicago Board of Censors cut, in Reel 1, the two intertitles "Oh, listen, it's something you must know" and "What the devil do you expect me to do about it?", scene of young woman whispering in man's ear, and the entire incident of man taking wallet from pocket, removing bills, and offering them to young woman.
