= The Judgment House =

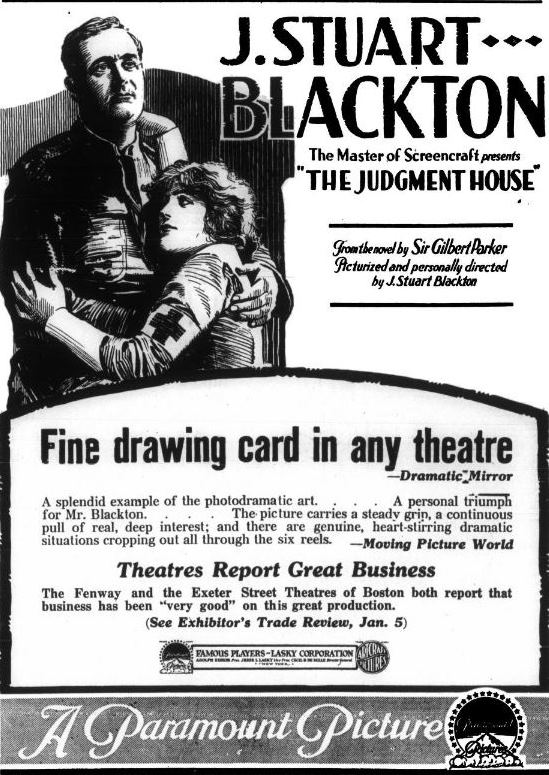
- Directed by: J. Stuart Blackton
- Screenplay by: J. Stuart Blackton
- Based on: The Judgement House by Gilbert Parker
- Produced by: J. Stuart Blackton
- Starring: Violet Heming; Wilfred Lucas; Conway Tearle; Paul Doucet; Florence Deshon; Lucille Hammill
- Cinematography: Tom Malloy
- Production company: J. Stuart Blackton Feature Pictures
- Distributed by: Paramount Pictures
- Release date: November 19, 1917
- Running time: 75 minutes
- Country: United States
- Language: Silent (English intertitles)

The Judgment House is a 1917 American silent drama film directed by J. Stuart Blackton and written by J. Stuart Blackton based upon the novel by Gilbert Parker. The film stars Violet Heming, Wilfred Lucas, Conway Tearle, Paul Doucet, Florence Deshon, and Lucille Hammill. The film was released on November 19, 1917, by Paramount Pictures.

== Plot ==
As described in a film magazine, Jasmine Grenfel forsakes her suitor Ian Stafford and marries Rudyard Byng, who has worked his way up to the top rungs of success in the African diamond mines of the Transvaal. Stafford, saddened, goes to Africa. During the three years that follow Byng becomes dissipated. Adrian Fellowes, his secretary, has intrigues with several women including the dancer Al'Mah. He has also paid some attention to Jasmine, which has aroused the dancer's jealousy. Fellowes is found murdered and the husband and wife both suspect each other of the crime. At the outbreak of the Boer War Byng joins the army and Jasmine and Al'Mah join the Red Cross. The battles that ensue bring out the manhood of Byng. Al'Mah is struck by a fragment of a shell and in a dying confession admits the murder of Fellow. Jasmine and Byng are later happily reunited.

== Cast ==
- Violet Heming as Jasmine Grenfel
- Wilfred Lucas as Rudyard Byng
- Conway Tearle as Ian Stafford
- Paul Doucet as Adrian Fellowes
- Florence Deshon as Al'Mah
- Lucille Hammill as Lou
- Crazy Thunder as Krool

== Reception ==
Like many American films of the time, The Judgment House was subject to cuts by city and state film censorship boards. For example, the Chicago Board of Censors cut the intertitle "Did Fellowes lead you to believe that I am bad?"
