= Ladies in Lavender =

2004 film by Charles Dance

- Theatrical release poster
- Directed by: Charles Dance
- Written by: Charles Dance
- Based on: "Ladies in Lavender" by William J. Locke
- Produced by: Nik Powell; Nicolas Brown; Elizabeth Karlsen
- Starring: Judi Dench; Maggie Smith; Natascha McElhone; Miriam Margolyes; David Warner; Daniel Brühl
- Cinematography: Peter Biziou
- Music by: Nigel Hess
- Production companies: Take Partnerships; Scala Productions; Baker Street Media Finance; Paradigm Hyde Films; UK Film Council
- Distributed by: Entertainment Film Distributors
- Release dates: 12 November 2004 (United Kingdom); 29 April 2005 (United States)
- Running time: 104 minutes
- Country: United Kingdom
- Language: English
- Box office: $20.3 million

Ladies in Lavender is a 2004 British drama film written and directed by Charles Dance. The screenplay is based on a 1908 short story by William J. Locke. The film stars Judi Dench, Maggie Smith, Daniel Brühl and Miriam Margolyes.

== Plot ==
In 1936, the Widdington sisters, Janet and Ursula, live in a tight-knit, picturesque Cornwallian fishing village. Andrea, a gifted young Polish violinist from Kraków, is sailing to America when he is swept overboard from his ship in a storm. The sisters discover the handsome stranger washed up on the beach below their house and nurse him back to health. The presence of the musically talented young man disrupts the peaceful lives of the sisters, and Ursula develops romantic feelings for the much younger visitor.

Holidaying artist Olga Danilof, the sister of famed violinist Boris Danilof, becomes interested in Andrea after hearing him play the violin. Olga writes a letter to the sisters, telling them who she is and that she would like to introduce her brother to Andrea. Instead of giving him the letter, understanding her sister has feelings for Andrea, Janet burns it. As time progresses, Olga and Andrea grow closer and one day Andrea angrily confronts the sisters about the letter. Andrea, realizing that Ursula has feelings for him, apologizes for getting angry and they reconcile.

Olga tells her brother of Andrea's talent and he asks to meet Andrea in London. When Andrea meets with Olga to discuss the letter from her brother, she tells him that they must leave on a train immediately because her brother is only in London for twenty-four hours. Although Andrea cares deeply for the sisters, he knows this is his chance to start a career and he leaves with Olga without saying goodbye. The sisters, worried that something has happened to him, call a friend of Andrea's who tells them he saw Andrea and Olga getting on a train. Thinking she will never see him again, Ursula is heartbroken and Janet consoles her as best she can. Andrea later sends them a letter, along with a portrait of himself painted by Olga, thanking them for saving his life and announcing his performance. The sisters travel to London to attend Andrea's first public performance in Britain, while the rest of the village listens in on the radio with Dorcas in the Widdington's home. After exchanging greetings with Andrea, he is pulled away to meet others. Ursula tells her sister they should leave, and the sisters depart, having let Andrea go.

== Cast ==
- Judi Dench as Ursula Widdington
- Maggie Smith as Janet Widdington
- Daniel Brühl as Andrea Marowski
- Miriam Margolyes as Dorcas
- David Warner as Dr Mead
- Natascha McElhone as Olga Danilof
- Toby Jones as Hedley
- Freddie Jones as Jan Pendered
- Gregor Henderson-Begg as Luke Pendered
- Clive Russell as Adam Penruddocke
- Peter Cellier as BBC announcer
- Geoffrey Bayldon as Mr Penhaligan
- Finty Williams as Pretty local girl
- Jimmy Yuill as Constable Timmins
- Alan Cox as Obsequious man
- Trevor Ray as Very old man 1
- John Boswall as Very old man 2
- Timothy Bateson as Mr Hallett
- Roger Booth as Arthur

== Production ==
The original story by William Locke was first published on 26 December 1908 in Collier's magazine, Vol. 42, later appearing in book form in his short-story collection Faraway Stories (1916).

Ladies in Lavender was produced by Tale Partnerships and Scala Productions, with funding by Baker Street Media Finance, Paradigm Hyde Films, and the UK Film Council. Lakeshore Entertainment handled the rights to international distribution.

Filming took place in September and October 2003. Exteriors were filmed in Cadgwith, Helston, St. Ives and Prussia Cove in Cornwall. Interiors were filmed at the Pinewood Studios in Buckinghamshire.

The film marked the directorial debut of actor Charles Dance. Longtime friends Maggie Smith and Judi Dench were appearing together in a play in London's West End when Dance first approached them about the project. They immediately accepted his offer without even reading the script. Dance said that Smith and Dench were the only choice for the lead roles and without them the film would not have happened. Freddie Jones thought his part was poor but agreed to do it for the chance to work with Dench. Dance considered Polish actor Krzysztof Siwczyk for the role of Andrea. Producer Nik Powell was impressed by the film Good Bye, Lenin! and suggested German actor Daniel Brühl. The film was the first English-language role for Brühl.

== Soundtrack ==
Ladies in Lavender (Original Motion Picture Soundtrack)

Soundtrack album by Nigel Hess
- Released: 8 November 2004
- Genre: Classical
- Length: 55:34
- Label: Sony Classical Records

The film's original music was written by Nigel Hess — his first feature film score — and performed by Joshua Bell and the Royal Philharmonic Orchestra. Hess received a Classical BRIT Awards nomination for Best Soundtrack Composer.

The violin music played by Andrea, including compositions by Felix Mendelssohn, Niccolò Paganini, Jules Massenet, Claude Debussy, Pablo de Sarasate, and Johann Sebastian Bach, was also performed by Bell.

1. "Ladies in Lavender" (Joshua Bell) – 4:06
2. "Olga" (Joshua Bell) – 3:31
3. "Teaching Andrea" (Joshua Bell) – 2:53
4. "Fantasy for Violin and Orchestra" (Joshua Bell) – 3:40
5. "Méditation from Thaïs" by Jules Massenet (Joshua Bell) – 5:01
6. "Our Secret" (Joshua Bell) – 2:01
7. "On the Beach" (Royal Philharmonic Orchestra) – 2:33
8. "Introduction and Tarantella, Op. 43" by Pablo de Sarasate (Joshua Bell) – 5:16
9. "The Letter" (Joshua Bell) – 2:25
10. "Polish Dance – Zabawa Weselna" (Joshua Bell) – 2:41
11. "Stirrings" (Joshua Bell) – 1:50
12. "Potatoes" (Joshua Bell) – 1:49
13. "The Girl With Flaxen Hair" by Claude Debussy (Joshua Bell) – 2:33
14. "A Broken Heart" (Joshua Bell) – 3:33
15. "Two Sisters" (Royal Philharmonic Orchestra) – 2:22
16. "The Carnival of Venice" (Joshua Bell) – 9:20

== Release ==
On 8 November 2004, Ladies in Lavender had its UK premiere as the 58th Royal Film Performance, an event held in aid of the Film & TV Charity. It was released nationwide in the United Kingdom on 12 November 2004. It made its North American debut at the Tribeca Film Festival on 23 April 2005. The film opened in limited release in the United States on 29 April 2005. Ladies in Lavender grossed £2,604,852 in the UK and US$6,765,081 in North America (on limited release). Its total worldwide gross was $20,377,075.

== Reception ==
On Rotten Tomatoes the film has a rating of 64% based on reviews from 94 critics. On Metacritic it has a score of 61% based on reviews from 29 critics, indicating "generally favorable reviews".

Stephen Holden of The New York Times wrote: "[Dench and Smith] sink into their roles as comfortably as house cats burrowing into a down quilt on a windswept, rainy night... This amiably far-fetched film... heralds the return of the Comfy Movie (increasingly rare nowadays), the cinematic equivalent of a visit from a cherished but increasingly dithery maiden aunt. In this fading, sentimental genre peopled with grandes dames (usually English) making 'grande' pronouncements, the world revolves around tea, gardening and misty watercolor memories."

Roger Ebert of the Chicago Sun-Times called the film "perfectly sweet and civilized... It's a pleasure to watch Smith and Dench together; their acting is so natural it could be breathing."

In The Guardian, Peter Bradshaw observed that "despite a bit of shortbread-sugary emotion and an ending that fizzles out disappointingly, there's some nice period detail and decent lines in Charles Dance's directing debut," while Philip French of The Observer commented on the "beautiful setting, a succession of implausible incidents, and characteristically excellent work from Smith (all suppression and stoicism) and Dench (exuding unfulfilled yearning)."

Peter Keough of the Boston Phoenix said, "This exercise in scenery and music is as innocuous as a nosegay."

In the Chicago Tribune, Robert K. Elder awarded the film two out of a possible four stars and added: "[it] exemplifies that kind of polite, underdramatic Masterpiece Theatre staging that can either provide a surgical examination of English society or bore the pants off you. Ladies in Lavender does a bit of both... director Dance's momentum fades soon after Andrea's ankle mends, and we're left with a vague back story involving Andrea's intent to emigrate to America, though the mystery of how he ended up in Cornwall is never revisited nor revealed. [He] becomes sort of a blank character, a personality on whom we can impose our own curiosity and emotions... as compelling and original as this theme is, it's not enough to keep our attention, no matter how lovely the ladies in lavender are."

In August 2025, the film's score ranked number 27 in Classic FM's annual "Movie Music Hall of Fame" of the top 100 film scores voted by radio listeners in the United Kingdom.

== Awards and nominations ==
Both Judi Dench and Maggie Smith were nominated for Best European Actress at the European Film Awards. Dench was nominated for the ALFS Award for British Actress of the Year by the London Film Critics Circle.
