= Morals (film) =

1921 American silent drama film

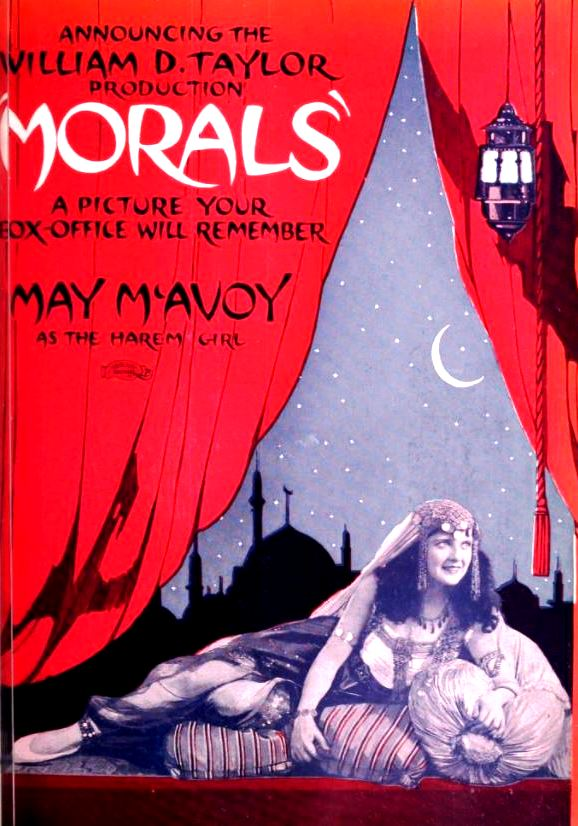
- Newspaper ad noting appearance by Kathlyn Williams before each screening
- Directed by: William Desmond Taylor
- Written by: Julia Crawford Ivers (scenario)
- Based on: The Morals of Marcus Ordeyne by William John Locke
- Produced by: Realart Pictures Company
- Starring: May McAvoy; William P. Carleton
- Cinematography: James Van Trees
- Distributed by: Paramount Pictures
- Release date: November 1921
- Running time: 5 reels (5,152 feet)
- Country: United States
- Language: Silent (English intertitles)

Morals is a 1921 American silent drama film directed by William Desmond Taylor and starring May McAvoy, William P. Carleton, and Marian Skinner. It is based on a 1905 novel, The Morals of Marcus Ordeyne by William John Locke, which was produced as a 1907 Broadway play starring Marie Doro who later made her screen debut in a 1915 film version.

A British talking version of Locke's story was made in 1935 as The Morals of Marcus.

== Plot ==
To escape a forced marriage, Carlotta flees the Turkish harem where she was raised and runs off to London with a British adventurer. After he is killed, she is taken in by Sir Marcus Ordeyne; captivated by her charm and innocence, he falls in love with her and prepares to marry her. However, Judith Mainwaring, determined to drive away her rival, tells Carlotta that the proposal was made not out of love, but to avoid a scandal. Hurt and disillusioned—though still in love—Carlotta abruptly leaves for Paris with Sebastian Pasquale, a friend of Sir Marcus. Much later, Judith Mainwaring tracks her down and reveals that Sir Marcus has been searching for her. Upon hearing this, Carlotta sets out to reunite with the man she still loves.

== Cast ==
- May McAvoy as Carlotta
- William P. Carleton as Sir Marcus Ordeyne
- W.E. Lawrence as Sebastian Pasquale
- Marian Skinner as Mrs McMurray
- Nick De Ruiz as Hamdi
- Starke Patteson as Harry
- Kathlyn Williams as Judith Mainwaring
- Bridgetta Clark as Antoinette
- Sidney Bracey as Stinson

== Preservation status ==
This film is preserved in the collection of the Library of Congress.
