= The Beloved Vagabond (novel) =

1906 novel

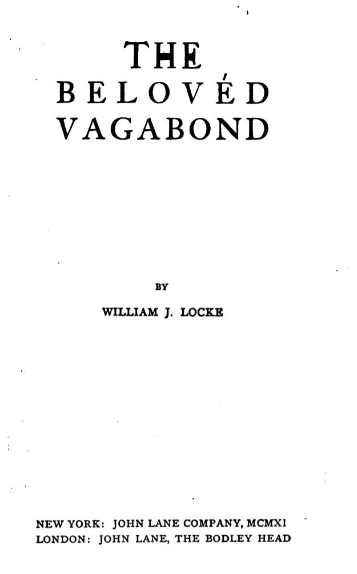
- Title page for The Beloved Vagabond (1906)
- Author: William John Locke
- Language: English
- Genre: Adventure
- Publication date: 1906
- Media type: Print

The Beloved Vagabond is a 1906 British novel written by William John Locke. It is the most famous work of Locke. In nineteenth-century France, an architect decides to disguise himself as a tramp.

== Adaptations ==
In 1908 Locke adapted the novel into a play. Several film adaptations have been made, including in 1915, 1923 and 1936.

== Bibliography ==
- Neuburg, Victor E., The Popular Press Companion to Popular Literature. Bowling Green State University Popular Press, 1983
