= The Morals of Marcus (1935 film) =

1935 film

- Directed by: Miles Mander
- Written by: Guy Bolton; H. Fowler Mear; Miles Mander
- Based on: The Morals of Marcus Ordeyne by William John Locke
- Produced by: Julius Hagen
- Starring: Ian Hunter; Lupe Vélez; Adrianne Allen; Noel Madison
- Cinematography: Sydney Blythe
- Edited by: Jack Harris
- Music by: W.L. Trytel
- Production company: Twickenham Studios
- Distributed by: Gaumont British Distributors
- Release date: February 1935
- Running time: 75 minutes
- Country: United Kingdom
- Language: English

The Morals of Marcus is a 1935 British comedy film directed by Miles Mander and starring Lupe Vélez, Ian Hunter and Adrianne Allen. It was written by Guy Bolton, H. Fowler Mear and Mander based on the 1905 novel The Morals of Marcus Ordeyne by William John Locke. The Morals of Marcus had been previously filmed twice as silents in 1915 (The Morals of Marcus, with Marie Doro) and in 1921 (Morals, with May McAvoy).

The screenplay concerns an archaeologist who finds a woman hiding in his luggage who has escaped from a harem and they eventually fall in love and marry.

== Plot ==
To escape a forced marriage, Carlotta flees from a Syrian harem and stows away aboard on an archeological cargo ship belonging to Sir Marcus Ordeyne. She falls in love with him, but they are then separated, finally re-uniting in Paris.

== Cast ==
- Ian Hunter as Sir Marcus Ordeyne
- Lupe Vélez as Carlotta
- Adrianne Allen as Judith
- Noel Madison as Tony Pasquale
- J.H. Roberts as butler
- Frank Atkinson as ship's steward
- Johnny Nitt as nightclub tap dancer
- Jenny Laird as maid

== Production ==
It was filmed at Twickenham Studios. Hagen brought in Vélez, a leading Mexican actress, to give the film greater international appeal.

== Reception ==
The Monthly Film Bulletin wrote: "This screen version of a novel is bright, full of varied incidents, has some very good comic touches, and is technically well-produced; yet notwithstanding the vivacious acting of Lupe Velez the thought rises that success as a novel is no guarantee of success when the same theme is put on the screen."

The Daily Film Renter wrote: "This adaptation of William J. Locke's appealing romance inevitably strikes a familiar note, while the lively performance of Lupe Velez does much to make the film entertaining. ... This slight and familiar story is competently handled by Miles Mander, who has made the most of the characterisations and brought out both its touches of humour and its appeal to the emotions. The attractive entertainment is, of course, due largely to the work of Miss Velez, who is absolutely at home in the role of the naive but impulsive fugitive from the harem."
