= One Thousand Dollars =

Short story by O. Henry

"One Thousand Dollars" is a short story by O.Henry, with his usual twist ending. It was published in the collection The Voice of the City in 1908. It was adapted into a five-reel film in 1918.

== Synopsis ==
Young Bobby Gillian is left $1,000 by his uncle Septimus Gillian in his will. In reality, Old Gillian was worth at least half a million dollars. The insignificant amount left to young Gillian is because the elder Gillian knows that Bobby is a wastrel. This money is left only as a test, as to what he does with his money. The condition of the will [in the form of a codicil] is that after he spends his $1,000, he has to give an account—in writing—of how he spent his money to the lawyer Tolman, who has been appointed for this purpose by old Gillian. If Tolman thinks that the money has been spent in right way, he would hand over an additional $50,000 to young Gillian. Young Gillian is not to be told about the codicil until he has given his account of expenditure in writing to Tolman.

Young Gillian asks several people how they would spend the money and found none of the answers satisfactory. He returns to Tolman's office and inquires about the inheritance of Miss Hayden, his uncle's ward. Tolman informs him that Miss Hayden received $10 and a sealing ring, the same as the butler and housekeeper. Gillian travels to his uncle's house where Miss Hayden still resides. He gives her the money and proceeds to write out his accounting of how he spent the money.

When Bobby submits the account to Tolman in a sealed envelope, the latter informs him about the codicil: if he spends his money well, he will receive $50,000, and if he fails to do so, Miss Hayden will receive that amount. Bobby immediately picks up the unopened envelope, and tears it to pieces and leaves whistling to himself.

== Interpretation ==
One interpretation posits that Young Gillian had a change of heart and character (from being a wastrel and spendthrift to a person of substance) when he sought advice from a blind man selling pencils on the corner. The man's bank account exceeded Gillian's $1,000 windfall.

At this point, Young Gillian freely gave his money to his uncle's ward who was left without a decent inheritance from Gillian's uncle. Gillian's selfless act then rewarded him (and Miss Hayden) fifty-fold. This could explain Gillian's light-hearted exit from the lawyer Toler's office after tearing up his accounting of how he spent the initial $1,000. (Toler could possibly have determined that Gillian's selfless act warranted payment of the $50,000 inheritance to Gillian, instead of going to Miss Hayden.)

Arguably, this story turns "The Gift of the Magi" on its head, as both Gillian and Miss Hayden are benefitted without any real loss to either.
