= William John Locke =

British writer (1863–1930)

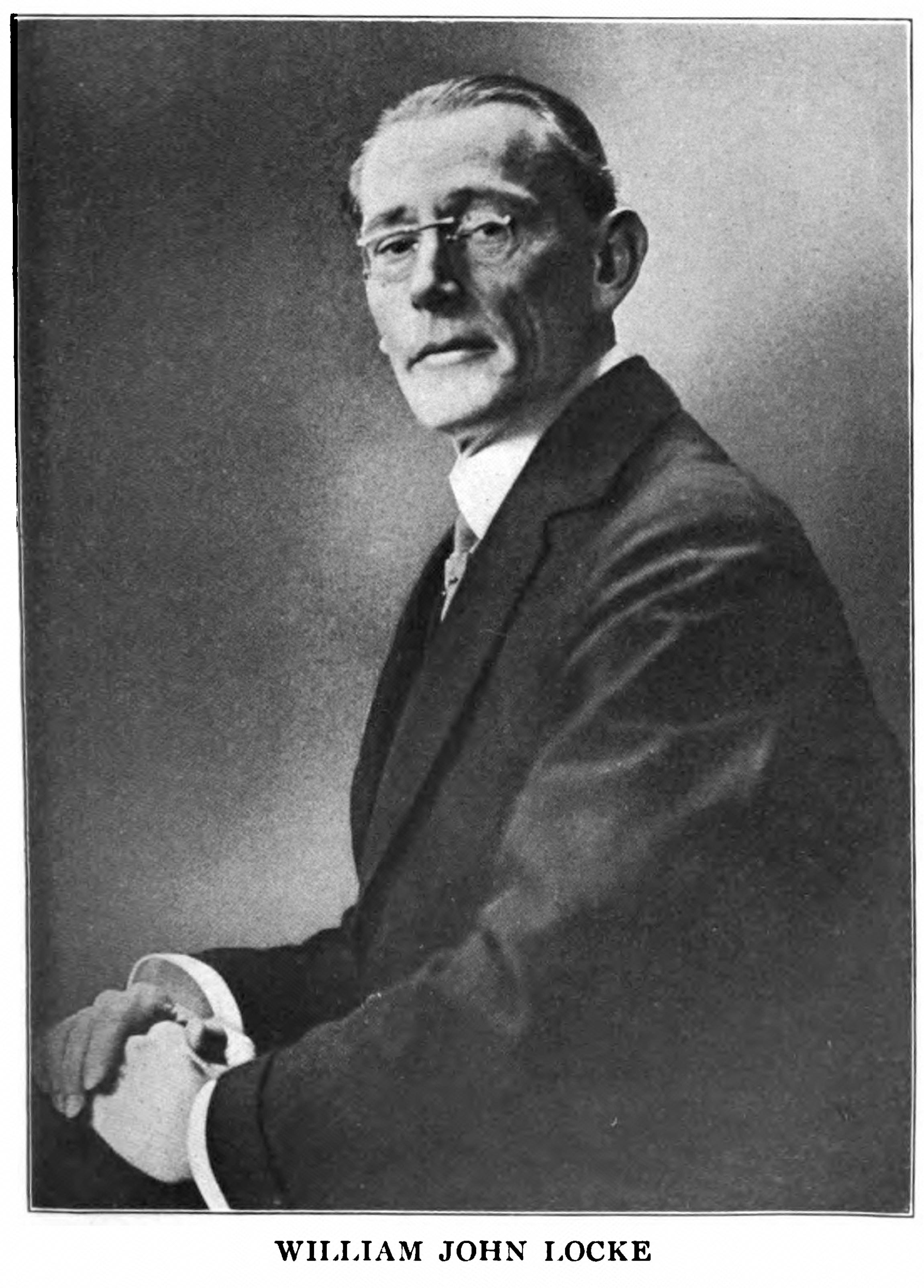
- Locke, c. 1912
- Born: 20 March 1863; Cunningsbury St George, Christ Church, Demerara, British Guiana
- Died: 15 May 1930 (aged 67); Paris, France
- Occupations: Novelist and playwright
- Spouse: Aimee Maxwell Close (née Heath)
- Relatives: John Locke – Father; Sarah Elizabeth Locke (née Johns) – Mother; Charlie Alfred Locke – Brother; Anna Alexandra Hyde (née Locke) – Half-sister; Henry Lytton Locke – Half-brother
- Writing career
- Genre: Drama

William John Locke (20 March 1863 – 15 May 1930) was a British novelist, dramatist and playwright, best known for his short stories.

== Biography ==
He was born in Georgetown, Demerara, British Guyana on 20 March 1863, the eldest son of John Locke, Bank Manager of Barbados, and his first wife, Sarah Elizabeth Locke (née Johns). His parents were English. In 1865, a second son was born, Charles Alfred Locke in Berbice, British Guyana, who was eventually to become a doctor. In about 1867 the family moved to Trinidad and Tobago. Charles Locke died in 1904 aged 39. His half-sister, Anna Alexandra Hyde (née Locke), by his father's second marriage, died in 1898 in childbirth aged 25.

At the age of three, Locke was sent to England for further education. He remained in England for nine years, before returning to Trinidad to attend prep school with his brother at Queen's Royal College. There, he won an exhibition to enter St John's College, Cambridge. He returned to England in 1881 to attend Cambridge University, where he graduated with honours in Mathematics in 1884, despite his dislike of that "utterly futile and inhuman subject".

Simon the Jester (1910)

After leaving Cambridge, Locke became a schoolmaster. He disliked teaching, but is known to have been a master at the Oxford Military College at Temple Cowley, in 1889 and 1890, and at Clifton College, Bristol in 1890; from 1891 to 1897 he was modern languages master at Trinity College, Glenalmond. In 1893 he published a school edition of Murat, an extract from the Celebrated Crimes (Les crimes célèbres) of Alexandre Dumas père. In 1890 he became seriously ill with tuberculosis, which affected him for the rest of his life. From 1897 to 1907 he was secretary of the Royal Institute of British Architects and lived in London.

In 1894 he published his first novel, At the Gate of Samaria, but he did not achieve real success for another decade, with The Morals of Marcus Ordeyne (1905) and The Beloved Vagabond (1906). Chambers Biographical Dictionary wrote of his "long series of novels and plays which with their charmingly written sentimental themes had such a success during his life in both Britain and America.... His plays, some of which were dramatised versions of his novels, were all produced with success on the London Stage" (p. 836).

On 19 May 1911, Locke married Aimee Maxwell Close (née Heath), the divorced wife of Percy Hamilton Close, in Chelsea in London. The wedding was attended by Alice Baines and James Douglas.

Five times Locke's books made the list of best-selling novels in the United States for the year. His works have been made into 24 films, one being Ladies in Lavender, filmed in 2004 and starring Judi Dench and Maggie Smith. Adapted to the screen by Charles Dance, it was based on Locke's 1916 short story of the same title that had been published in a collection entitled "Faraway Stories." Probably the most famous of Locke's books adapted to the screen was the 1918 production of Stella Maris starring Mary Pickford. In addition, four of his books were made into Broadway plays, two of which Locke wrote and were produced by Charles Frohman.

In the early twentieth century Locke lived at Corner Hall, Hemel Hempstead in England.

Locke died from cancer, aged 67, on 15 May 1930, in Paris, France.

== Bibliography ==
=== Books ===
- At the Gate of Samaria (1894)
- The Demagogue and Lady Phayre (1895)
- Some Women and a Man; A Comedy of Contrasts (1896)
- Derelicts (1897)
- The White Dove (1900)
- The Usurper (1901)
- Where Love Is (1903)
- The Morals of Marcus Ordeyne (1905)
- The Beloved Vagabond (1906)
- A Study in Shadows (1908)
- Septimus (1909) No. 10 for 1909 in the U.S.
- A Christmas Mystery – The Story of Three Wise Men (1910)
- Viviette (1910)
- Simon the Jester (1910) No. 6 for 1910 in the U.S.
- The Glory of Clementina Wing The Glory of Clementina Wing (1911)
- Idols (1911)
- The Joyous Adventures of Aristide Pujol (1912)
- Stella Maris (1913)
- The Fortunate Youth (1914) No. 5 for 1914 in the U.S.
- The William J. Locke Calendar (1914) Compiled by Emma M. Pope
- Jaffery (1915) No. 6 for 1915 in the U.S.
- Faraway Stories (1916) (short story collection)
- The Wonderful Year (1916)
- The Red Planet (1917) No. 3 for 1917 in the U.S.
- The Rough Road (1918)
- The Mountebank (1920. Serialised in Nash's & Pall Mall magazine February 1920)
- The House of Baltazar (1920)
- The Apostle (1921)
- The Tale of Triona (1922)
- The Lengthened Shadow (1923)
- Moordius & Co (1923)
- The Golden Journey of Mr. Paradyne (1924)
- The Coming of Amos (1924)
- The Great Pandolfo (1925)
- Perella (1926)
- The Old Bridge (1926)
- Stories Near and Far (1927)
- The Kingdom of Theophilus (1927)
- Joshua's Vision (1928)
- Ancestor Jorico (1929)
- The Town of Tombarel (1930)
- The Shorn Lamb (1930)

=== Short stories ===
- "Aftermath". [Uncollected]
  - 1895 Jul, in The New Review Vol. 13, pp. 103–116
  - 1895 Sep, in The Eclectic Magazine New Series Vol. 62, pp. 399–407 (from New Review)
  - 1895 Nov 30, @ PapersPast
- "A Fool's Errand". [Uncollected]
  - 1896 Mar 1, The Chap-Book Vol. 4, pp. 377–396
- "The Redemption of Jonas Eames". [Uncollected]
  - 1898 Jan 21, in Manchester Weekly Times
  - 1898 Jan 22, in The Nottinghamshire Guardian
  - 1898 Jul 27, @ Trove
  - 1903 Feb 14, @ PapersPast
  - 1912 Jul 13, @ Trove
  - 1927 Feb, in Argosy (UK)
- "The Strange Making of Roddy Nicol". [Uncollected]
  - 1899 Feb 18, in The Newcastle Courant
  - 1900 Feb 3, in The Manchester Courier Weekly Supplement
  - 1902 Oct 11, in The Whitstable Times and Herne Bay Herald
- Ridet Olympus.
  - 1899 Sep, in The Anglo-Saxon Review Vol.2, pp. 146–155
- "Martha Barrable’s Plot". [Uncollected]
  - 1899 Oct 21, in The Hampshire Telegraph Supplement
  - 1906 Sep 8, in The Derby Daily Telegraph
  - 1906 Dec 29, @ Trove
- "An Open Window". [Uncollected]
  - 1900 Jul 21, in The Newcastle Courant
  - 1902 Sep 13, in The Whitstable Times and Herne Bay Herald
- "The Story of Bertha Begg". [Uncollected]
  - 1900 Jul 27, in The Lichfield Mercury
- "The Dawn of a Day After a Night of Suffering". [Uncollected]
  - 1901 Jun 15, in The Manchester Courier Supplement
  - 1901 Aug 10, @ Trove
  - 1902 Mar 8, @ PapersPast
  - 1903 Nov 7, in The Whitstable Times and Herne Bay Herald
- "The Princess’s Kingdom".
  - 1905 Sep, in Ainslee's Magazine
  - 1925 Jun, in The Golden Book Magazine Vol. 1, pp. 773–
- "A Lover’s Dilemma".
  - 1908 Apr 11, in Collier's Vol. 41, pp. 15–
  - 1908 May, in The Pall Mall Magazine Vol. 41, pp. 527–535
  - 1926 May, in Famous Story Magazine
  - 1926 Jun, in The Famous Story Magazine (UK)
- "The Heart at Twenty".
  - 1908 Nov, in Ainslee's Magazine
  - 1925 Nov, in Ainslee's Magazine
  - 1926 Jun, in Argosy (UK)
- "Ladies in Lavender".
  - 1908 Dec 26, in Collier's Vol.42, pp. 15–
  - 1915 Apr 11, in Illustrated Sunday Magazine
  - 1927 Dec, in Argosy (UK)
- "A Moonlight Effect".
  - 1908, in The Illustrated London News Christmas Number
  - 1909 Aug, in The American Magazine Vol. 68, pp. 392–
- "An Old-World Episode".
  - 1909 Sep 25, in The Saturday Evening Post Vol. 182, pp. 3–
  - 1926 Nov, in The Famous Story Magazine
  - 1927 Mar, in The Famous Story Magazine (UK)
- "A Christmas Mystery".
  - 1909 Dec, in The American Magazine Vol. 69, pp. 147–
  - 1926 Dec, in Argosy (UK)
  - 1929 Dec, in The Golden Book Magazine Vol. 10, pp. 39–
- "Viviette".
  - 1910 Nov etc., in Ainslee's Magazine
  - 1929 Jul, in Argosy (UK)

The Joyous Adventures of Aristide Pujol:

- "The Adventure of the Fair Patronne".
  - 1911 Jan, in The American Magazine Vol. 71, pp. 290–
- "The Adventure of the Arlesienne".
  - 1911 Feb, in The American Magazine Vol. 71, pp. 467–
- The Adventure of the Foundling".
  - 1911 May, in The American Magazine Vol. 72, pp. 21–
  - 1928 Dec, in Argosy (UK)
- "The Adventure of the Kind Mr. Smith".
  - 1911 Jul, in The American Magazine Vol. 72, pp. 339–
  - 1926 Sep, in The Golden Book Magazine Vol. 4, pp. 331–
  - 1936 Oct, in Argosy (UK)
  - 194?, in Short Story Magazine #9
  - 1950 Aug, in Ellery Queen's Mystery Magazine
- "The Adventure of Fleurette".
  - 1911 Sep, in The American Magazine Vol. 72, pp. 578–
  - 1925 Oct, in The Golden Book Magazine Vol. 2, pp. 537–
- "The Adventure of the Miracle".
  - 1911 Oct, in The American Magazine Vol. 72, pp. 766–
- "The Adventure of the Fickle Goddess".
  - 1912 Aug, in The American Magazine Vol. 74, pp. 439–
  - 1930 Aug, in The Golden Book Magazine Vol. 12, pp. 30–
- "The Adventure of a Saint Martin’s Summer".
  - 1912 Sep, in The American Magazine

———

- The Joyous Adventures of Aristide Pujol (1912)
- "The Adventure of the Fair Patronne" (1911)
- "The Adventure of the Arlesienne" (1911)
- "The Adventure of the Kind Mr. Smith" (1911)
- "The Adventure of the Foundling" (1911)
- "The Adventure of the Pig’s Head"
- "The Adventure of Fleurette" (1911)
- "The Adventure of the Miracle" (1911)
- "The Adventure of the Fickle Goddess" (1912)
- "The Adventure of a Saint Martin’s Summer" (1912)

———

- "The Conqueror".
  - 1912 Dec, in The Windsor Magazine
  - 1913 Mar, in Everybody’s Magazine Vol. 28, pp. 291–
  - 1926 Aug, in The Famous Story Magazine
  - 1926 Dec, in The Famous Story Magazine (UK)
  - 1940 Jan, in Argosy (UK)
- "The Song of Life".
  - 1913 Dec, in Everybody’s Magazine Vol. 29, pp. 755–
  - 1927 Aug, in Argosy (UK)
- "The Scourge".
  - 1914 Sep, in Hearst's Magazine Vol. 26, pp. 296–308
  - 1926 Jan, in The Famous Story Magazine
  - 1926 May, in The Famous Story Magazine (UK)
  - 1939 Dec, in Argosy (UK)
- "A Woman of the War".
  - 1918 Aug, in Cosmopolitan Vol. 65, pp. 44–

———

- Far-Away Stories (1916) (1919)
- "The Song of a Life" (1913)
- "Ladies in Lavender" (1908)
- Studies in Blindness:
- "An Old-World Episode" (1909)
- "The Conqueror" (1912)
- "A Lover’s Dilemma" (1908)
- "A Woman of the War" (1918) [added 1919]
- "A Christmas Mystery" (1909) [omitted 1919]
- "The Princess’s Kingdom" (1905)
- "The Heart at Twenty" (1908)
- "The Scourge" (1914)
- "Viviette" (1910) [omitted 1919]
- "My Shadow Friends" [added 1919]

———

- "As it was in the Beginning" ("The Song of Oo-oo")
  - 1924 Mar, in Hearst's International Vol. 45
- The Golden Journey of Mr. Paradyne.
  - 1924 May, in Hearst's International Vol. 45
- Pontifex.
  - 1926 Apr, in Cosmopolitan
  - 1930 Apr, in The Grand Magazine
- "A Spartan of the Hills".
  - 1926 Jun, in Cosmopolitan Vol. 80
- "Roses".
  - 1926 Sep, in Cosmopolitan Vol. 81

———

- Stories Near and Far (1926) (1927)
- "The Song of Oo-oo" (1924, as "As it was in the Beginning")
- "A Moonlight Effect" (1908)
- "A Spartan of the Hills" (1926)
- "Pontifex" (1926)
- "An Echo of the Past"
- "The Apostle"
- "Ridet Olympus" (1899)
- "The Golden Journey of Mr. Paradyne" (1924)
- "Roses" (1926) [added 1927]

———

- "Madeleine of Creille".
  - 1926 Nov, in Cosmopolitan Vol. 81
- "Too Many Dreams". ("A Lady Paramount")
  - 1927 Apr, in Cosmopolitan Vol. 82
- "Love in Provence" ("The Mayorality of Creille")
  - 1927 Oct, in Cosmopolitan Vol. 83
- "The Famous Max Cadol".
  - 1928 Jan, in Cosmopolitan Vol. 84
- "When the Circus Came to Creille".
  - 1928 May, in Cosmopolitan Vol. 84
- "A Tale of Tombarel’s Past" ("Bouillabaisse")
  - 1930 Apr, in Cosmopolitan Vol. 88
- "A Snowflake from Picardy".
  - 1930 Jun, in Cosmopolitan Vol. 88

———

- The Town of Tombarel (1930)
- "A Spartan of the Hills" (1926)
- "Roses" (1926)
- "Madeleine of Creille" (1926)
- "A Lady Paramount" (1927, as "Too Many Dreams")
- "The Famous Max Cadol" (1928)
- "The Mayorality of Creille" (1927, as "Love in Provence")
- "When the Circus Came to Creille" (1928)
- "Bouillabaisse" (1930, as "A Tale of Tombarel’s Past")
- "A Snow-Flake from Picardy" (1930)
———

== Film adaptations ==
- The Morals of Marcus, directed by Edwin S. Porter and Hugh Ford (1915, based on the novel The Morals of Marcus Ordeyne)
- The Glory of Clementina, directed by Ashley Miller (1915, based on the novel The Glory of Clementina Wing)
- Simon the Jester, directed by Edward José (1915, based on the novel Simon the Jester)
- The Beloved Vagabond, directed by Edward José (1915, based on the novel The Beloved Vagabond)
- The Fortunate Youth, directed by Joseph W. Smiley (1916, based on the novel The Fortunate Youth)
- Idols, directed by Webster Cullison (1916, based on the novel Idols)
- Jaffery, directed by George Irving (1916, based on the novel Jaffery)
- Where Love Is (1917, based on the novel Where Love Is)
- Derelicts, directed by Sidney Morgan (UK, 1917, based on the novel Derelicts)
- Stella Maris, directed by Marshall Neilan (1918, based on the novel Stella Maris)
- Viviette, directed by Walter Edwards (1918, based on the novel Viviette)
- The Usurper, directed by Duncan McRae (1919, based on the novel The Usurper)
- The White Dove, directed by Henry King (1920, based on the novel The White Dove)
- The Joyous Adventures of Aristide Pujol, directed by Frank Miller (UK, 1920, based on the book The Joyous Adventures of Aristide Pujol)
- The Song of the Soul, directed by John W. Noble (1920, based on the story "An Old-World Episode")
- The Oath, directed by Raoul Walsh (1921, based on the novel Idols)
- The Wonderful Year, directed by Kenelm Foss (UK, 1921, based on the novel The Wonderful Year)
- Morals, directed by William Desmond Taylor (1921, based on the novel The Morals of Marcus Ordeyne)
- The Glory of Clementina, directed by Émile Chautard (1922, based on the novel The Glory of Clementina Wing)
- The Beloved Vagabond, directed by Fred LeRoy Granville (UK, 1923, based on the novel The Beloved Vagabond)
- A Fool's Awakening, directed by Harold M. Shaw (1924, based on the novel The Tale of Triona)
- The Side Show of Life, directed by Herbert Brenon (1924, based on the novel The Mountebank)
- The Coming of Amos, directed by Paul Sloane (1925, based on the novel The Coming of Amos)
- Simon the Jester, directed by George Melford (1925, based on the novel Simon the Jester)
- Stella Maris, directed by Charles Brabin (1925, based on the novel Stella Maris)
- Strangers in Love, directed by Lothar Mendes (1932, based on the novel The Shorn Lamb)
- The Morals of Marcus, directed by Miles Mander (UK, 1935, based on the novel The Morals of Marcus Ordeyne)
- The Beloved Vagabond, directed by Curtis Bernhardt (UK, 1936, based on the novel The Beloved Vagabond)
- Stella Maris, directed by Homero Cárpena (Argentina, 1953, based on the novel Stella Maris)
- Ladies in Lavender, directed by Charles Dance (UK, 2004, based on the story "Ladies in Lavender")
