= The Morals of Marcus (1915 film) =

1915 film

- Directed by: Edwin S. Porter; Hugh Ford
- Written by: William J. Locke (novel: The Morals of Marcus Ordeyne); Eve Unsell (scenario)
- Produced by: Adolph Zukor; Charles Frohman
- Starring: Marie Doro
- Distributed by: Paramount Pictures
- Release date: January 18, 1915
- Running time: 5 reels
- Country: United States
- Language: Silent film (English intertitles)

The Morals of Marcus is a lost 1915 American silent comedy-drama film produced by the Famous Players Film Company and distributed by Paramount Pictures. It is based on a 1905 novel by William John Locke, The Morals of Marcus Ordeyne, which was later produced on Broadway in 1907. The star of the play was Marie Doro who makes her motion picture debut in this film version. Both Edwin S. Porter and Hugh Ford take part in the direction of the film. The story was remade in 1921 as Morals with May McAvoy and in 1935 as The Morals of Marcus with Lupe Vélez.

== Cast ==
- Marie Doro – Carlotta
- Eugene Ormonde – Marcus Ordeyne
- Ida Darling – Mrs. Ordeyne
- Julian L'Estrange – Pasquale
- Russell Bassett – Hamdi
- Frank Andrews – Mustapha
- Wellington Playter – English Vice-Consul
- Phyllis Carrington – Vice-Consul's Wife
- Helen Freeman – Dora
- J. W. Austin – Harry Pelligrew

== See also ==
- Edwin S. Porter filmography
