= The Beloved Vagabond (1923 film) =

1923 British film by Fred LeRoy Granville

The Beloved Vagabond (1923)
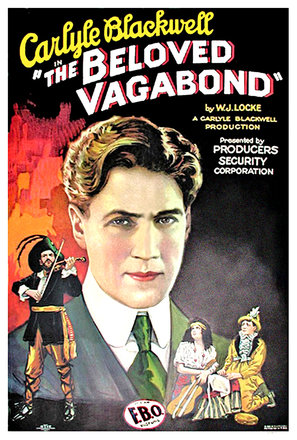
- Directed by: Fred LeRoy Granville
- Based on: The Beloved Vagabond by William John Locke
- Starring: Carlyle Blackwell
- Distributed by: Astra Films-National
- Release date: October 1923
- Running time: 10 reels (10,020 feet)
- Country: United Kingdom
- Languages: Silent (English intertitles)

The Beloved Vagabond is a 1923 British romantic drama film directed by Fred LeRoy Granville and starring Carlyle Blackwell, Madge Stuart, Jessie Matthews and Phyllis Titmuss. The film is based on the 1906 novel The Beloved Vagabond by William John Locke.

== Plot ==
As described in a film magazine review, in order to save the father of Joanna Rushworth, the young woman that he loves, from financial ruin, the wealthy Gaston de Nerac signs a paper giving her up to Comte de Verneuil, whom she then weds. Living as a tramp musician, he wanders through Brittany with Asticot and Blanquette, boy and girl, the latter an orphan. Later, the Comte dies. Joanna and her former lover meet again. Realizing that they are no longer suited to each other, he marries Blanquette.

== Cast ==
- Carlyle Blackwell as Gaston de Nerac / Paragot
- Madge Stuart as Blanquette
- Phyllis Titmuss as Joanna Rushworth
- Sydney Fairbrother as Mrs. Smith
- Albert Chase as Asticot
- Owen Roughwood as Comte de Verneuil
- Hubert Carter as DuBosc
- Cameron Carr as Bradshaw
- Irene Tripod as Madame Bain
- Ernest Hilliard as Major Walters
- Alfred Wood as Mr. Rushworth
- Emilie Nichol as Mrs. Rushworth
- Jessie Matthews as Pan
- Mrs. Hubert Willis as Mrs. DuBosc
- Marise Dorval
