= The Beloved Vagabond (1936 film) =

1936 British film directed by Curtis Bernhardt

- Directed by: Curtis Bernhardt
- Written by: Arthur Wimperis; Walter Creighton; Hugh Mills
- Based on: Novel by William John Locke
- Produced by: Ludovico Toeplitz
- Starring: Maurice Chevalier; Betty Stockfeld; Margaret Lockwood; Desmond Tester
- Cinematography: Franz Planer
- Edited by: Douglas Myers
- Music by: Darius Milhaud
- Production company: Toeplitz Productions
- Distributed by: Associated British (UK); Columbia Pictures (US)
- Release dates: 25 August 1936 (London, UK)
- Running time: 78 minutes
- Country: United Kingdom
- Language: English

The Beloved Vagabond is a 1936 British musical drama film directed by Curtis Bernhardt and starring Maurice Chevalier, Betty Stockfeld, Margaret Lockwood and Austin Trevor. It was written by Hugh Mills, Walter Creighton and Arthur Wimperis, adapted from the 1906 novel by William John Locke. The film was made at Ealing Studios by the independent producer Ludovico Toeplitz.

== Plot ==
In 1900, a poor but promising French architect, Gaston de Nerac, living in London woos Joanne Rushworth, the daughter of a gentleman facing economic ruin through exposure of his financial wrongdoing. Count de Verneuil, a rival for the hand of Joanne promises to resolve the father's economic problems in return for the hand of Joanne. Gaston feels obliged to agree and returns to France taking with him Asticot, a young boy also living in the boarding house.

During their meanderings in rural France, Gaston and Asticot meet a young woman, Blanquette, who is trying to support herself through music. They get together and become a musical partnership, finally moving to Paris where in a bar Gaston bumps into the Count de Verneuil – Gaston's old rival – who is now married to Joanne. Shortly after the meeting, the Count dies and Joanne is once more a free woman.

Joanne meets with Gaston and they re-establish the warm relationship of old, a painful process for Blanquette who, by this time, has fallen in love with Gaston (though he is oblivious to this).

Gaston and Joanne return to London to make plans for their wedding. Gaston invites Blanquette and Asticot to the wedding and they bring with them the spirit of life on the road. This is fascinating for the other conservative guests but annoying for Joanne who relegates the two to the kitchen to be fed away from the other guests. This proves too much for Gaston who rows with Joanne. When Joanne reveals to Gaston the obvious – that Blanquette is in love with him—he races off to find his two friends. But they have already departed for the train to Dover and the ferry to France.

Gaston requires the help of a horseless carriage to get to Dover to join Blanquette and Asticot. On the boat, he surprises Blanquette and tells her that he wants to be with his wife. She is puzzled and looks around for another woman before realising that she is the wife Gaston is referring to. A happy ending is guaranteed.

== Cast ==
- Maurice Chevalier as Gaston de Nerac 'Paragot'
- Betty Stockfeld as Joanna Rushworth
- Margaret Lockwood as Blanquette
- Desmond Tester as Asticot
- Austin Trevor as Count de Verneuil
- Peter Haddon as Major Walters
- Charles Carson as Charles Rushworth
- Cathleen Nesbitt as Mme Boin
- Barbara Gott as concierge
- Amy Veness as cafe owner
- D.J. Williams as undertaker
- C. Denier Warren as railway clerk

== Production ==
The film was shot in English and French versions with different supporting casts.

== Reception ==
The Monthly Film Bulletin wrote: "A tedious and disappointing film lacking much of the charm of the original novel. Maurice Chevalier would have seemed an excellent choice for the French wooer of a conventional English girl of the last century ... But the comedy lacks life though Chevalier works hard."

Kine Weekly wrote: "Kurt [sic] Bernhardt has on the whole, made a good thing out of Locke's novel, though one feels that the French atmosphere of Paragot's adventures is due far more to the presence of Maurice Chevalier than to the nature of the production as such. Some of the Continental scenes are very English in style and pace."

The Daily Film Renter wrote: "Slender plot, leisurely direction and uninspired choice of song numbers create boredom, while whole thing lacks conviction, but stellar personality and attractive rustic exteriors are assets. ... The hero is always Maurice Chevalier, wearing a funny tie, and trying to be a serious actor, a feat he never seems to be able to accomplish, despite a great deal of sincerity."
