= Skinner's Dress Suit =

Skinner's Dress Suit may refer to:

- Skinner's Dress Suit (1926 film), an American silent comedy film
- Skinner's Dress Suit (1917 film), an American silent comedy film
