= Thirty a Week =

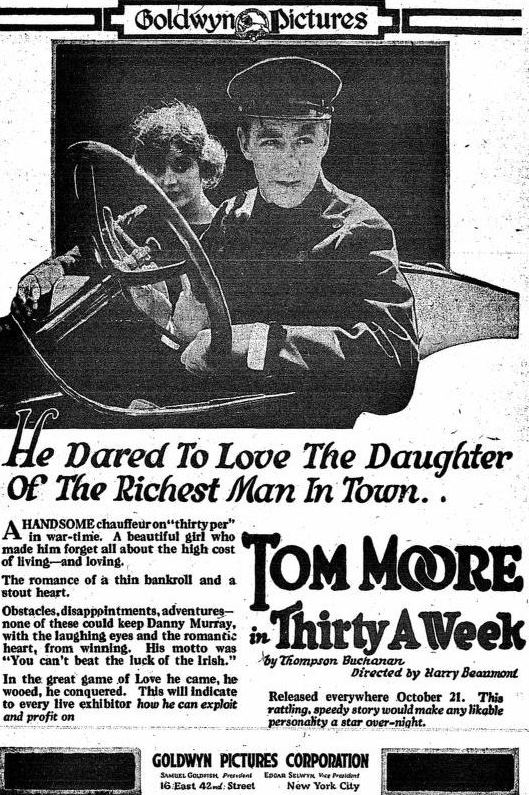
- Directed by: Harry Beaumont
- Written by: J. Clarkson Miller
- Based on: a play Thirty A Week by Thompson Buchanan
- Produced by: Samuel Goldwyn
- Starring: Tom Moore
- Cinematography: George Webber
- Distributed by: Goldwyn Pictures
- Release date: October 13, 1918
- Running time: 50 minutes
- Country: USA
- Language: Silent...English titles

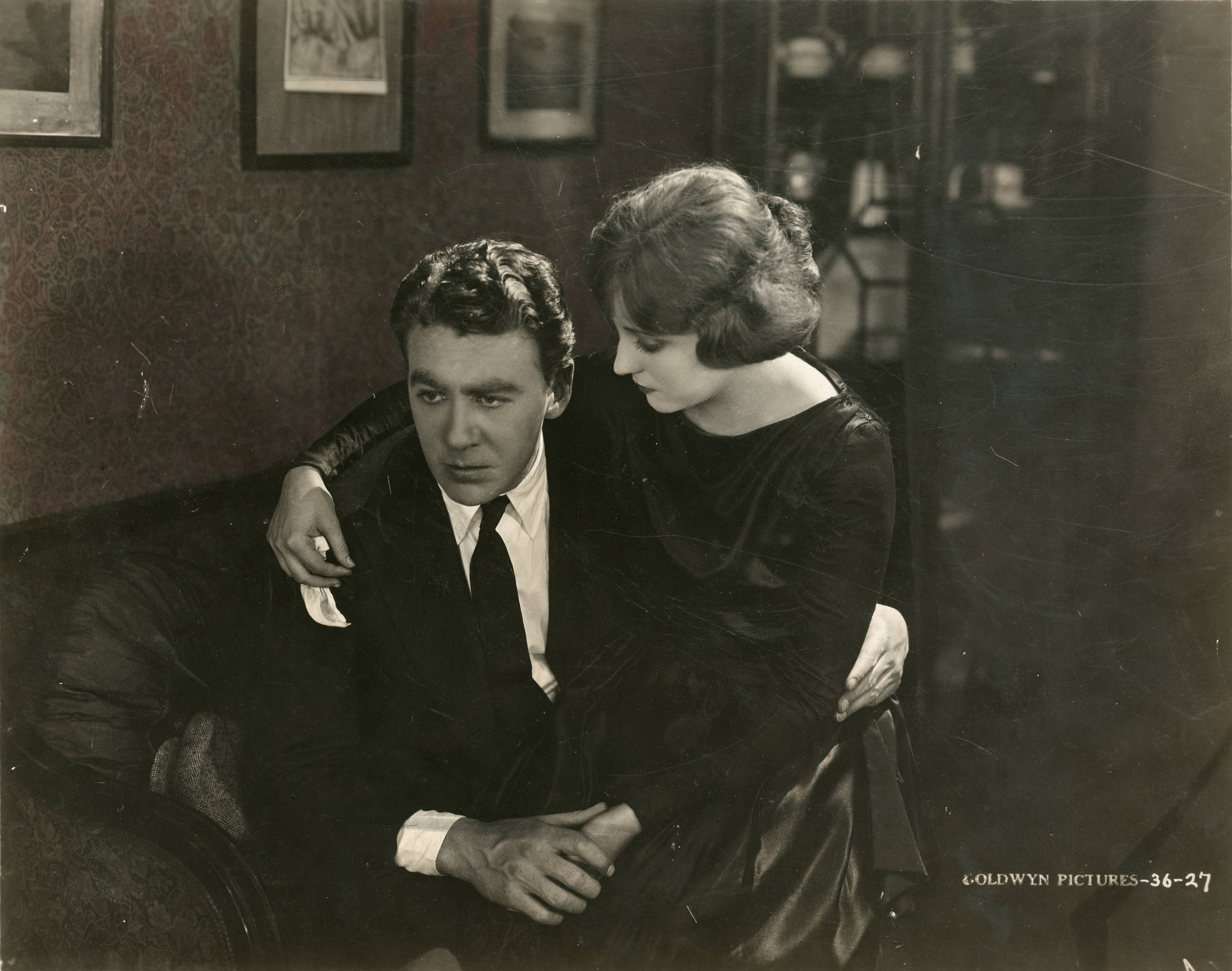
Tom Moore and Tallulah Bankhead

Thirty a Week is a lost 1918 silent film drama directed by Harry Beaumont and starring Tom Moore and sixteen year old ingenue Tallulah Bankhead in one of her first screen appearances. It was produced and distributed by Goldwyn Pictures.

== Cast ==
- Tom Moore as Dan Murray
- Alec B. Francis as Mr. Wright
- Brenda Fowler as Mrs. Wright
- Warburton Gamble as Freddy Ruyter
- Grace Henderson as Mrs. Murray
- Ruth Elder as Minnie Malloy (*Ruth Elder, not the aviatrix)
- Tallulah Bankhead as Barbara Wright (*uncredited)
