= A Wild Goose Chase =

1919 silent film

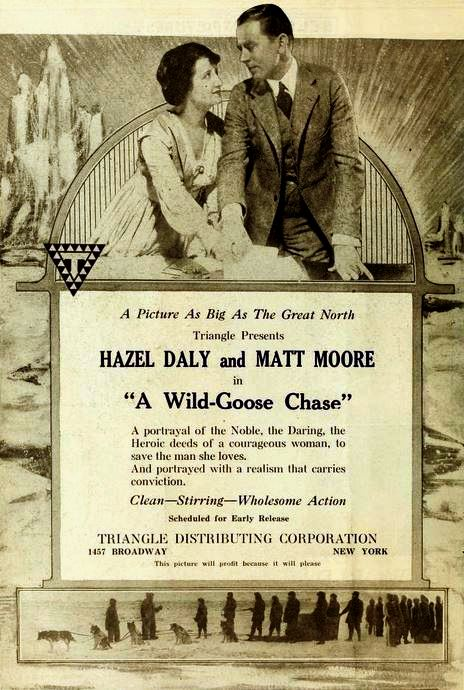
- Directed by: Harry Beaumont
- Written by: Edwin Balmer
- Starring: Matt Moore; Hazel Daly; Sidney Ainsworth
- Production company: Triangle Film Corporation
- Distributed by: Triangle Distributing
- Release date: March 2, 1919
- Running time: 50 minutes
- Country: United States
- Languages: Silent; English intertitles

A Wild Goose Chase is a 1919 American silent adventure film directed by Harry Beaumont and starring Matt Moore, Hazel Daly and Sidney Ainsworth.

== Cast ==
- Hazel Daly as Margaret Sherwood
- Sidney Ainsworth
- Chester Barnett
- Matt Moore

== Bibliography ==
- Nash, Jay Robert. The Motion Picture Guide 1988 Annual. Cinebooks, 1997.
