= Harry Beaumont =

American film director, actor, and screenwriter (1888–1966)

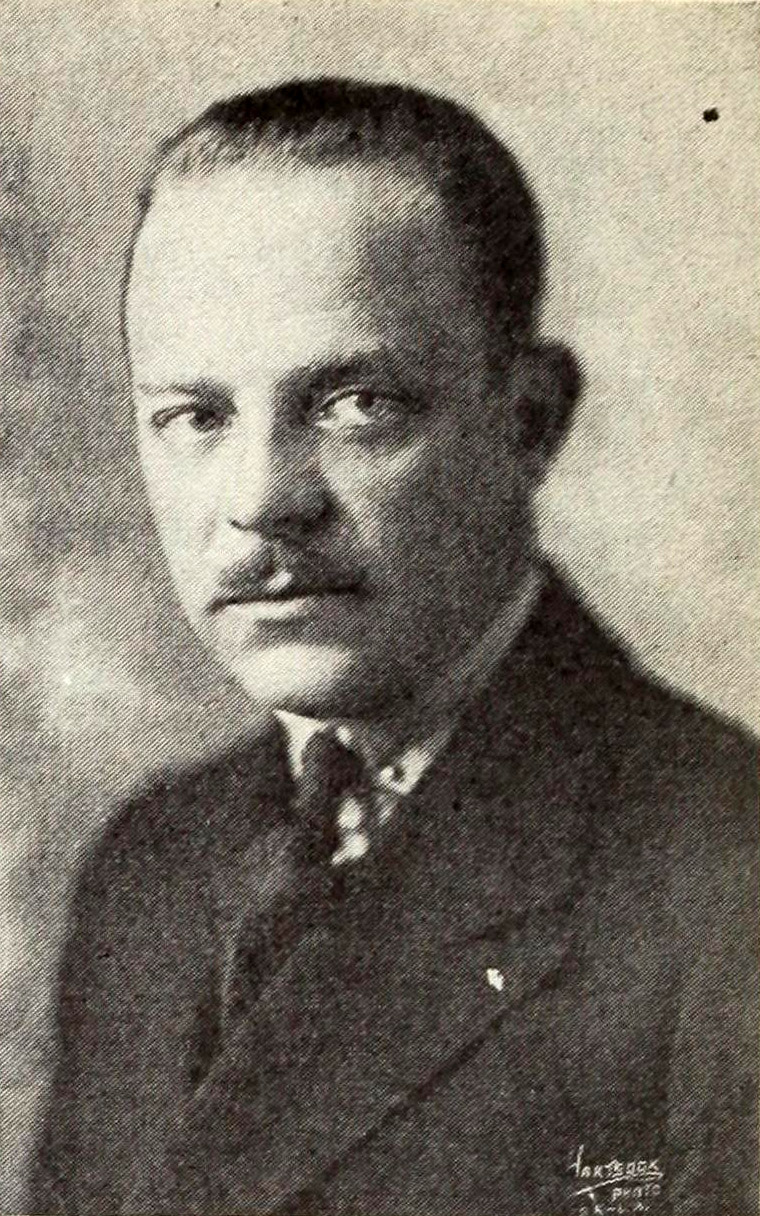
- Beaumont in 1921
- Born: February 10, 1888; Abilene, Kansas, U.S.
- Died: December 22, 1966 (aged 78); Santa Monica, California, U.S.
- Resting place: Forest Lawn Memorial Park, Glendale
- Occupations: Director, actor, screenwriter
- Years active: 1911–1948
- Spouse: Hazel Daly
- Children: 2

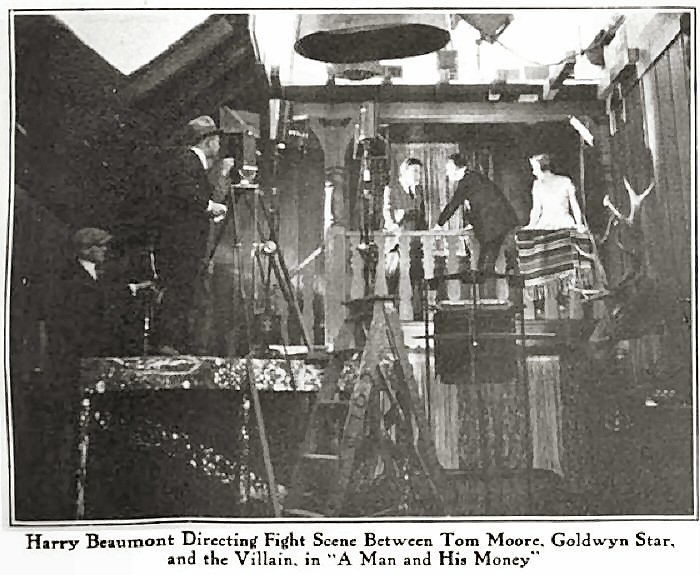
Beaumont directing a scene for the film A Man and His Money (1919)

Harry Beaumont (10 February 1888 – 22 December 1966) was an American film director, actor, and screenwriter. He worked for a variety of production companies including Fox, Goldwyn, Metro, Warner Brothers, and Metro-Goldwyn-Mayer.

== Career ==
Beaumont's greatest successes were during the silent film era, when he directed films including John Barrymore's Beau Brummel (1924) and the silent youth movie Our Dancing Daughters (1928), featuring Joan Crawford. He then directed MGM's first talkie musical, The Broadway Melody (1929). The latter film won the Best Picture Academy Award that year, and Beaumont was nominated for Best Director.

== Personal life and death ==
Beaumont was married to actress Hazel Daly. The couple had twin daughters Anne and Geraldine, born in 1922.

On 22 December 1966, Beaumont died at St. John's Hospital in Santa Monica, California. His gravesite is at Forest Lawn Memorial Park, Glendale.

== Filmography ==
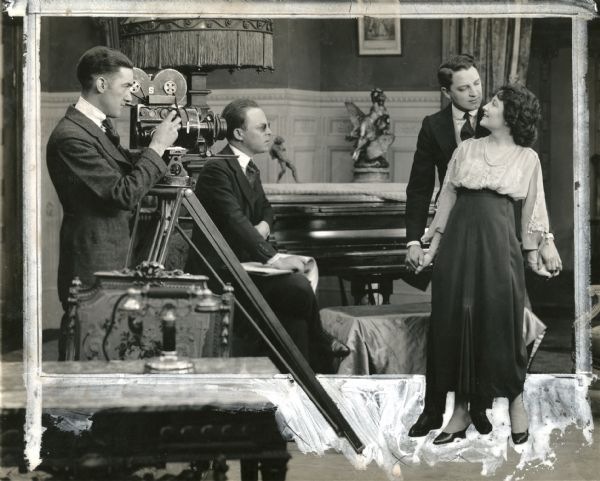
Beaumont directing Bryant Washburn and Hazel Daly in Filling His Own Shoes (1917)

=== Director ===
- The Truant Soul (1916)
- Skinner's Dress Suit (1917)
- Burning the Candle (1917)
- Skinner's Bubble (1917)
- Filling His Own Shoes (1917)
- Skinner's Baby (1917)
- Go West, Young Man (1918)
- Thirty a Week (1918)
- Brown of Harvard (1918)
- A Wild Goose Chase (1919)
- The Little Rowdy (1919)
- One of the Finest (1919)
- Heartsease (1919)
- A Man and His Money (1919)
- The City of Comrades (1919)
- The Gay Lord Quex (1919)
- Lord and Lady Algy (1919)
- Toby's Bow (1919)
- Dollars and Sense (1920)
- The Great Accident (1920)
- Going Some (1920)
- Stop Thief! (1920)
- The Fourteenth Man (1922)
- June Madness (1922)
- The Five Dollar Baby (1922)
- The Ragged Heiress (1922)
- They Like 'Em Rough (1922)
- Love in the Dark (1922)
- Seeing's Believing (1922)
- Glass Houses (1922)
- Very Truly Yours (1922)
- Lights of the Desert (1922)
- Crinoline and Romance (1923)
- Main Street (1923)
- A Noise in Newboro (1923)
- The Gold Diggers (1923)
- Beau Brummel (1924)
- Babbitt (1924)
- The Lover of Camille (1924)
- Don't Doubt Your Husband (1924)
- A Lost Lady (1924)
- His Majesty, Bunker Bean (1925)
- Rose of the World (1925)
- Recompense (1925)
- Sandy (1926)
- Womanpower (1926)
- One Increasing Purpose (1927)
- Forbidden Hours (1928)
- Our Dancing Daughters (1928)
- A Single Man (1929)
- The Broadway Melody (1929)
- Speedway (1929)
- Our Blushing Brides (1930)
- The Florodora Girl (1930)
- Children of Pleasure (1930)
- Lord Byron of Broadway (1930)
- Those Three French Girls (1930)
- Dance, Fools, Dance (1931)
- Laughing Sinners (1931)
- The Great Lover (1931)
- West of Broadway (1931)
- Faithless (1932)
- Are You Listening? (1932)
- Unashamed (1932)
- Made on Broadway (1933)
- Should Ladies Behave (1933)
- When Ladies Meet (1933)
- Murder in the Private Car (1934)
- Enchanted April (1935)
- The Girl on the Front Page (1936)
- When's Your Birthday? (1937)
- Maisie Goes to Reno (1944)
- Twice Blessed (1945)
- Up Goes Maisie (1946)
- The Show-Off (1946)
- Undercover Maisie (1947)
- Alias a Gentleman (1948)
- Great Day (Unfinished)

=== Writer ===
- Burning the Candle (1917)
- Filling His Own Shoes (1917)
- Brown of Harvard (1918)
- The Little Rowdy (1919)
- June Madness (1922)

== Actor ==
- The Librarian (1912, Short) as Jack Gibbs
