= The City of Comrades =

1919 film directed by Harry Beaumont

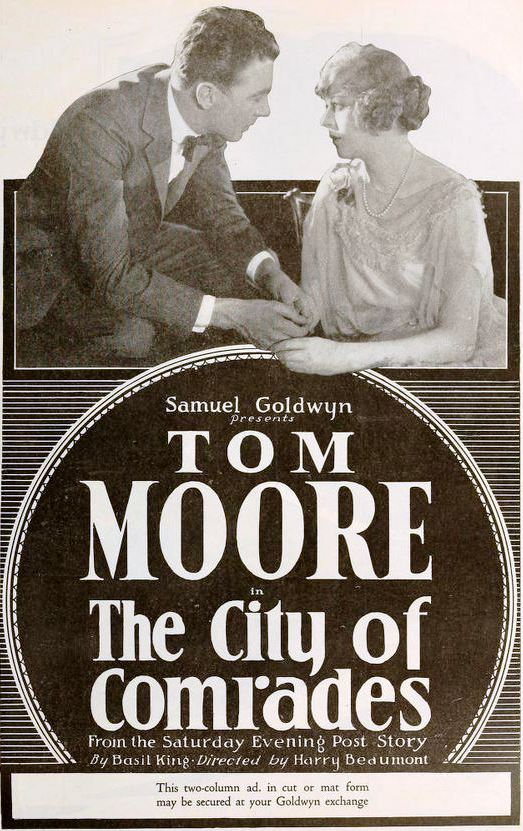
- Advertisement
- Directed by: Harry Beaumont
- Based on: The City of Comrades by Basil King
- Produced by: Samuel Goldwyn
- Starring: Tom Moore; Seena Owen
- Cinematography: George Webber
- Distributed by: Goldwyn Pictures
- Release date: July 13, 1919
- Running time: 50 minutes
- Country: United States
- Language: Silent (English intertitles)

The City of Comrades is a lost 1919 American silent drama film directed by Harry Beaumont with Tom Moore and Seena Owen in the leads. It was produced by Sam Goldwyn and released by Goldwyn Pictures.

== Cast ==
- Tom Moore as Frank Melbury
- Seena Owen as Regina Barry
- Otto Hoffman as Lovey
- Alan Roscoe as Dr. Stephen Cantyre (credited as Albert Roscoe)
- Alec B. Francis as Andy Christian
- Ralph Walker as Ralph Coningsby
- Mary Warren as Elsie Coningsby
- Kate Lester as Mrs. Sterling Barry
