= Skinner's Bubble =

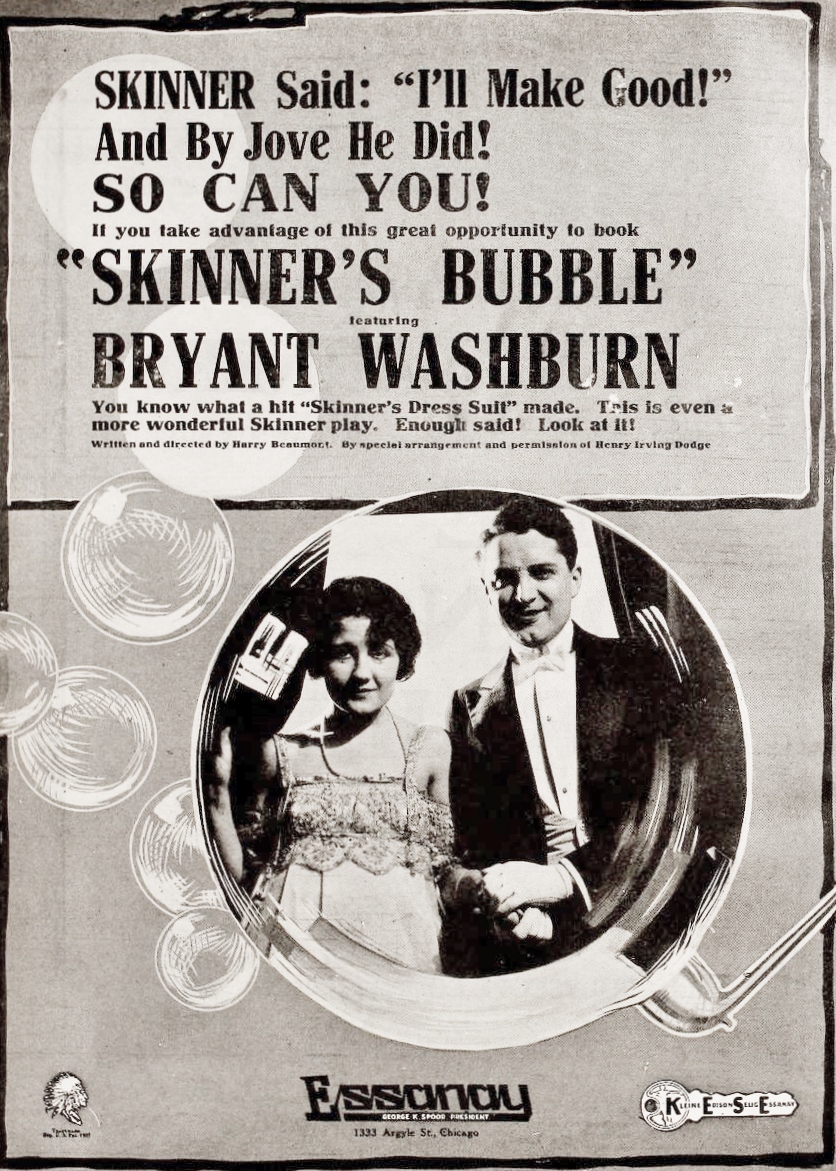
- Directed by: Harry Beaumont
- Written by: Harry Beaumont
- Starring: Bryant Washburn; Hazel Daly; James C. Carroll
- Production company: Essanay Pictures
- Distributed by: K-E-S-E Service
- Release date: April 23, 1917
- Running time: 50 minutes
- Country: United States
- Languages: Silent; English intertitles

Skinner's Bubble is a lost 1917 American silent comedy film directed by Harry Beaumont and starring Bryant Washburn, Hazel Daly and James C. Carroll. It was created as a sequel to Skinner's Dress Suit.

== Cast ==
- Bryant Washburn as William Manning Skinner
- Hazel Daly as Honey
- James C. Carroll as McLaughlin
- Ullrich Haupt as Perkins
- Marian Skinner as Mrs. McLaughlin

== Preservation ==
With no holdings located in archives, Skinner's Bubble is considered a lost film.

== Bibliography ==
- Joel Frykholm. George Kleine and American Cinema: The Movie Business and Film Culture in the Silent Era. Bloomsbury Publishing, 2019.
