= The Little Rowdy =

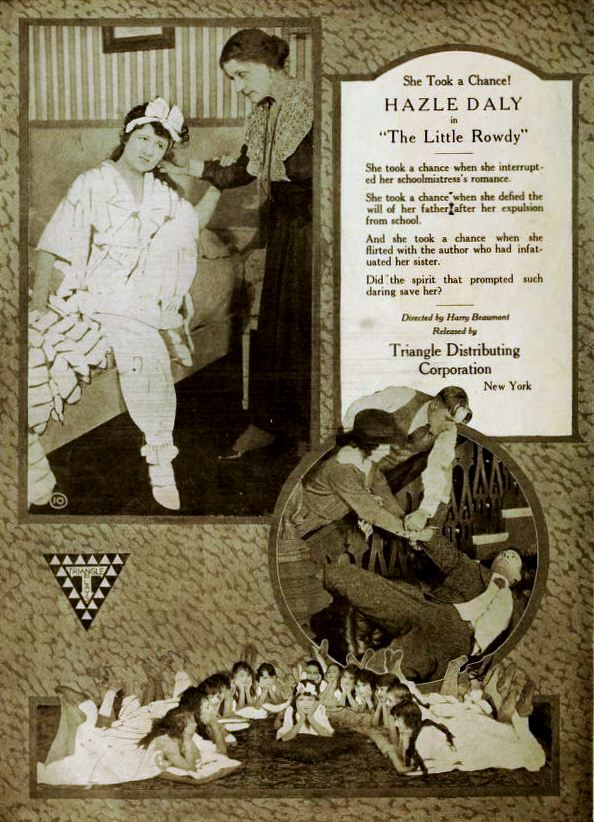
- Advertisement for The Little Rowdy on page 1750 of the March 29, 1919 issue of Moving Picture World
- Directed by: Harry Beaumont
- Story by: Harry Beaumont
- Starring: Hazel Daly; Harry Hilliard; Sidney Ainsworth
- Production company: Triangle Film Corporation
- Distributed by: Triangle Film Corporation
- Release date: March 23, 1919
- Running time: 5 reels
- Country: United States
- Languages: Silent film (English intertitles)

The Little Rowdy is a 1919 American silent comedy film directed by Harry Beaumont and starring Hazel Daly, Harry Hilliard, and Sidney Ainsworth. The film was released by Triangle Film Corporation on March 23, 1919.

== Plot ==
Betty Hall's constant pranks at boarding school has gotten her in bad with Ms. Elliott, the school's headmistress. Several times Betty is threatened with expulsion, and nothing stops her from creating mischief. But her latest prank is the final straw, where she ruins Miss Elliott's first and only love affair. Betty is expelled where her parents are furious and want to marry her off to the young Franklyn Winters, but Betty turns him down.

Franklyn is still besotted with her but his efforts are not fruitful. Then one day while Betty is out riding, her horse takes off while she's on it, and she is rescued by Roy Harper, a celebrated novelist. He takes her home to his apartment where Franklyn follows them, believing that the two are more than just acquaintances. Franklyn engages Roy in a fight, with the result that Betty wants nothing to do with him. Roy Harper immediately starts to make unwanted advances toward her and Betty now realizes how much she valued Winters after all.

She leaves in pursuit of Winters whom she now discovers she cannot live without. Winters has boarded a train for an officer's training camp and Betty just manages to make it onboard after a chase in an automobile, where the two reconcile. She pulls the emergency break at the next station, where the two lovebirds hop off of the train and search for the nearest minister.

== Cast ==
- Hazel Daly as Betty Hall, the little rowdy
- Harry Hilliard as Franklyn Winters
- Sidney Ainsworth as Roy Harper

== Preservation ==
The film is now considered lost.
