= Dollars and Sense (film) =

1920 silent film

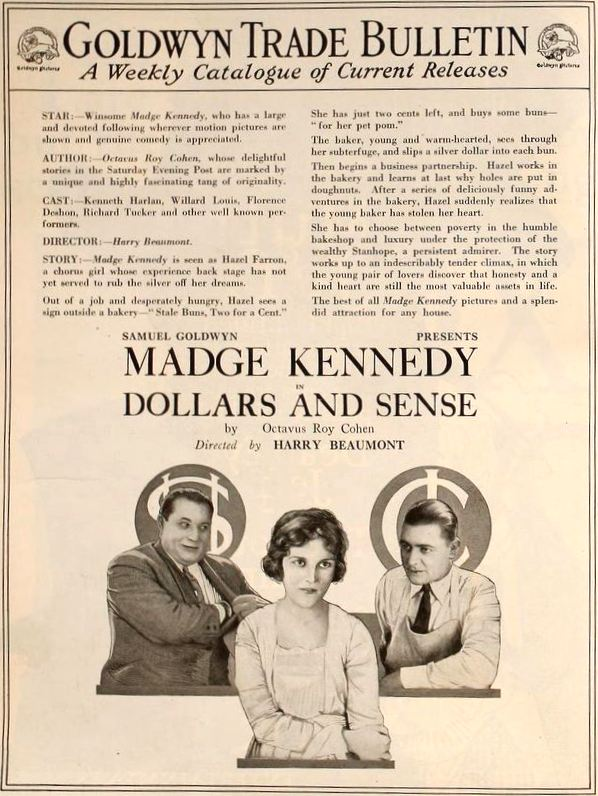
- Directed by: Harry Beaumont
- Written by: Octavus Roy Cohen (story); Gerald C. Duffy
- Starring: Madge Kennedy; Kenneth Harlan; Willard Louis
- Cinematography: Norbert Brodine
- Production company: Goldwyn Pictures
- Distributed by: Goldwyn Distributing
- Release date: June 27, 1920
- Running time: 50 minutes
- Country: United States
- Languages: Silent; English intertitles

Dollars and Sense is a 1920 American silent drama film directed by Harry Beaumont and starring Madge Kennedy, Kenneth Harlan and Willard Louis.

== Cast ==
- Madge Kennedy as Hazel Farron
- Kenneth Harlan as David Rogers
- Willard Louis as Geoffrey Stanhope
- Florence Deshon as Daisy
- Richard Tucker as George Garrison

== Bibliography ==
- Cooper C. Graham & Christoph Irmscher. Love and Loss in Hollywood: Florence Deshon, Max Eastman, and Charlie Chaplin. Indiana University Press, 2021.
