= A Double-Dyed Deceiver =

1920 film by Alfred E. Green

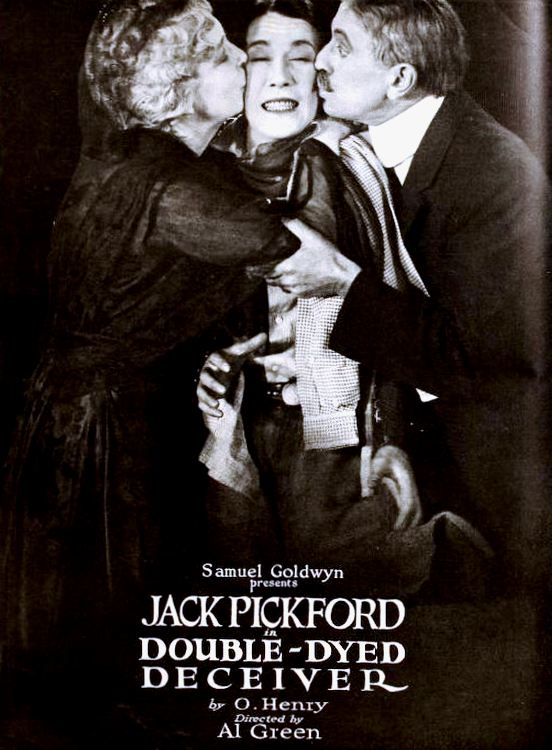
- Directed by: Alfred E. Green
- Written by: Edward T. Lowe Jr.
- Based on: a story, "Double-Dyed Deceiver", by O. Henry c.1905
- Produced by: Goldwyn Pictures
- Starring: Jack Pickford
- Cinematography: Clyde Cook
- Distributed by: Goldwyn Pictures
- Release date: June 1920
- Running time: 50 minutes
- Country: United States
- Language: Silent (English intertitles)

A Double-Dyed Deceiver is a lost 1920 American silent crime-drama film directed by Alfred E. Green and starring Jack Pickford. It was produced and distributed by the Goldwyn Pictures company.

== Plot ==
As described in a film magazine, The Llano Kid, after killing a Mexican in Texas, flees to Buennas Tierras, South America. The American counsel, seeking to rob an aristocratic Spanish family whose son disappeared years ago, schemes to use the Kid as a fence by having him pose as the lost son. The Kid is received royally by the family and for the first time he experiences love. Transformed through the experience of motherly love, the Kid rebels and he refuses to rob his benefactors. Instead, he falls in love with a relative and stays with the family.

== Cast ==
- Jack Pickford as The Llano Kid
- Marie Dunn as Estella
- James Neill as Senor Urique
- Edythe Chapman as Senora Urique
- Sidney Ainsworth as Thacker
- Manuel R. Ojeda as Secretary
