= The Gay Lord Quex (1919 film) =

1919 film by Harry Beaumont

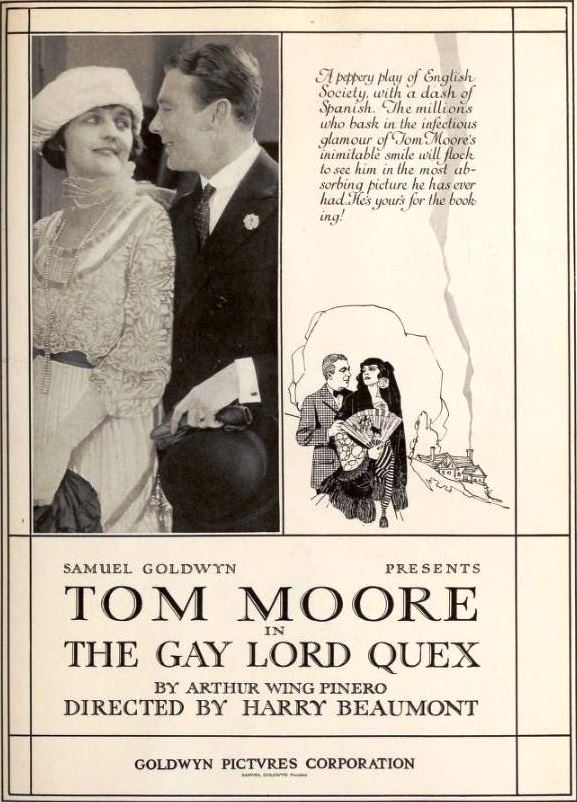
- Directed by: Harry Beaumont
- Written by: Edfrid A. Bingham
- Based on: The Gay Lord Quex by Arthur Wing Pinero
- Starring: Tom Moore; Gloria Hope; Naomi Childers
- Cinematography: Norbert Brodine; George Webber
- Production company: Goldwyn Pictures
- Distributed by: Goldwyn Distributing
- Release date: December 21, 1919
- Country: United States
- Language: Silent (English intertitles)

The Gay Lord Quex is a lost 1919 American silent comedy film directed by Harry Beaumont and starring Tom Moore, Gloria Hope, and Naomi Childers It is based on the 1899 play The Gay Lord Quex by the British writer Arthur Wing Pinero.

== Cast ==
- Tom Moore as The Marquis of Quex
- Gloria Hope as Muriel Eden
- Naomi Childers as The Duchess of Strood
- Hazel Daly as Sophie Fullgarney
- Sidney Ainsworth as Sir Chichester Frayne
- Philo McCullough as Captain Bastling
- Arthur Housman as Valma
- Kate Lester as Lady Owbridge
- Rube Miller as Jack Eden
- Kathleen Kirkham as Mrs. Jack Eden

== Bibliography ==
- Goble, Alan. The Complete Index to Literary Sources in Film. Walter de Gruyter, 1999.
