= Beating the Game (1921 crime film) =

1921 film by Victor Schertzinger

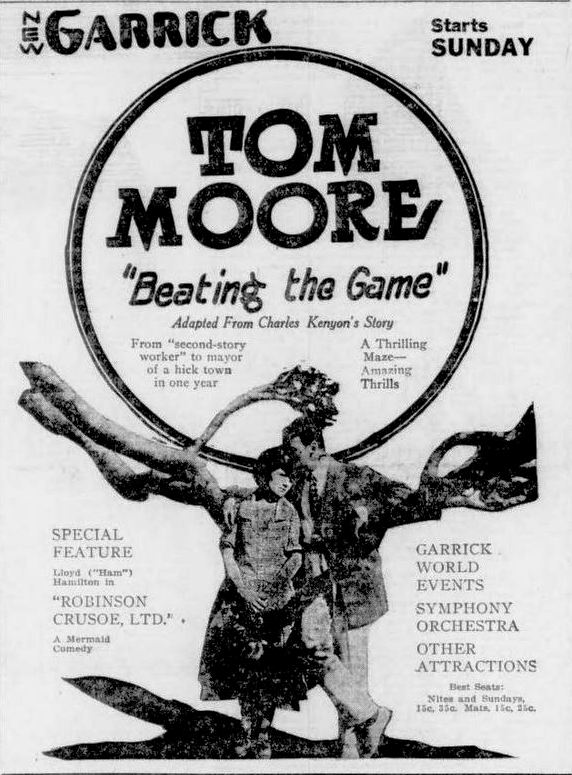
- Directed by: Victor Schertzinger
- Written by: Charles Kenyon
- Produced by: Samuel Goldwyn
- Starring: Tom Moore; Hazel Daly; DeWitt Jennings
- Cinematography: Ernest Miller
- Production company: Goldwyn Pictures
- Distributed by: Goldwyn Distributing
- Release date: September 1921
- Running time: 6 reels
- Country: United States
- Languages: Silent; English intertitles

Beating the Game is a 1921 American silent crime film directed by Victor Schertzinger and starring Tom Moore, Hazel Daly and DeWitt Jennings.

The film's sets were designed by the art director Cedric Gibbons.

== Cast ==
- Tom Moore as Fancy Charlie
- Hazel Daly as Nellie Brown
- DeWitt Jennings as G.B. Lawson
- Richard Rosson as Ben Fanchette
- Nick Cogley as 'Slipper' Jones
- Tom Ricketts as Jules Fanchette
- Lydia Knott as Madame Fanchette
- William Orlamond as Bank President
- Lydia Yeamans Titus as Angelica - the Bank President's Wife

== Bibliography ==
- James Robert Parish & Michael R. Pitts. Film directors: a guide to their American films. Scarecrow Press, 1974.
