= The Kingdom of Youth =

1918 silent film

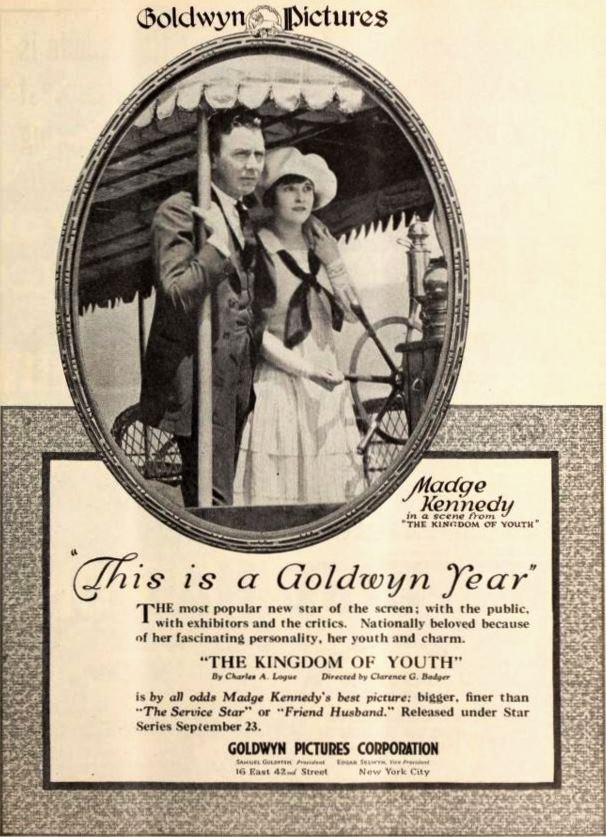
- Directed by: Clarence G. Badger
- Written by: Charles A. Logue; J. Clarkson Miller
- Produced by: Samuel Goldwyn
- Starring: Madge Kennedy; Tom Moore; Marie De Wolfe
- Cinematography: Ned Van Buren
- Production company: Goldwyn Pictures
- Distributed by: Goldwyn Pictures
- Release date: October 6, 1918
- Running time: 50 minutes
- Country: United States
- Languages: Silent; English intertitles

The Kingdom of Youth is a 1918 American silent comedy film directed by Clarence G. Badger and starring Madge Kennedy, Tom Moore and Marie De Wolfe. The film's sets were designed by the art director Hugo Ballin.

== Cast ==
- Madge Kennedy as Ruth Betts
- Tom Moore as Jimmy Betts
- Marie De Wolfe as Mrs. Ella Rice
- Lee Baker as Count Henri Duval
- Jennie Dickerson as Aunt Sophronia

== Bibliography ==
- Donald W. McCaffrey & Christopher P. Jacobs. Guide to the Silent Years of American Cinema. Greenwood Publishing, 1999.
