= One of the Finest =

1919 silent film

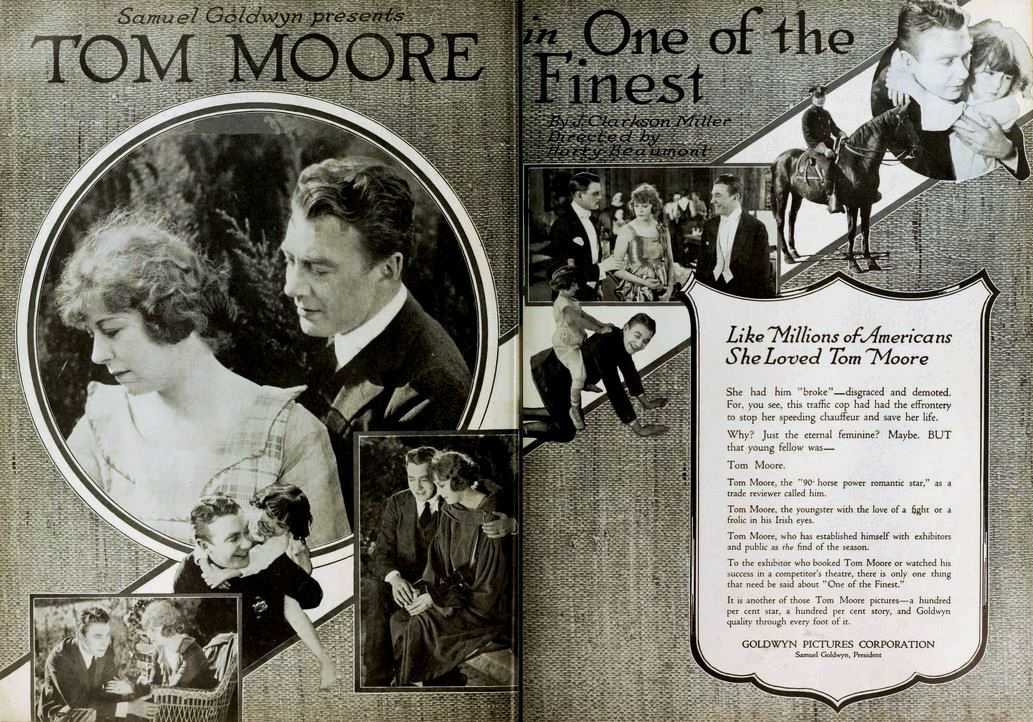
- Directed by: Harry Beaumont
- Written by: J. Clarkson Miller
- Produced by: Samuel Goldwyn
- Starring: Tom Moore; Seena Owen; Peaches Jackson
- Cinematography: George Webber
- Production company: Goldwyn Pictures
- Distributed by: Goldwyn Distributing
- Release date: June 1, 1919
- Running time: 50 minutes
- Country: United States
- Languages: Silent; English intertitles

One of the Finest is a 1919 American silent comedy film directed by Harry Beaumont and starring Tom Moore, Seena Owen and Peaches Jackson.

== Cast ==
- Tom Moore as Larry Hayes
- Seena Owen as Frances Hudson
- Peaches Jackson as Mary Jane
- Mollie McConnell as Mrs. Hayes
- Mary Warren as Nellie Andrews
- Hallam Cooley as Teddy
- Eddie Sturgis as Gus Andrews
- Frederick Vroom as Robert Fulton Hudson
- Adelaide Elliot as Mrs. Hudson

== Bibliography ==
- Langman, Larry. American Film Cycles: The Silent Era. Greenwood Publishing, 1998.
