= Hold Your Horses (film) =

1921 silent film

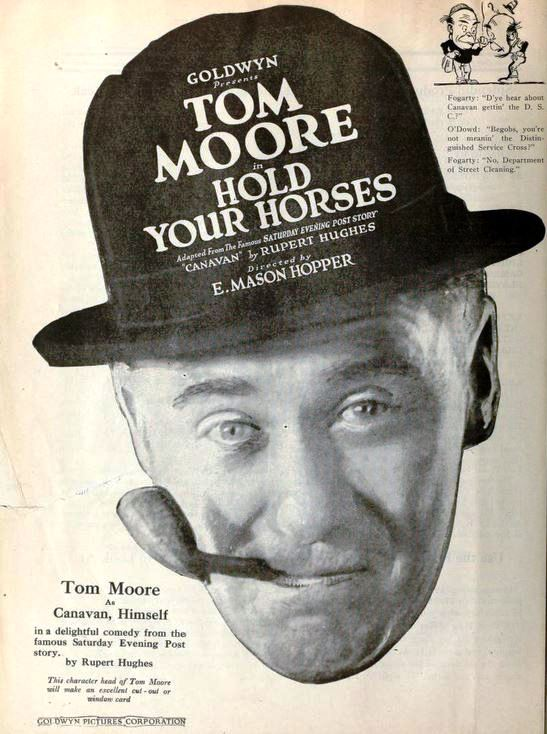
- Directed by: E. Mason Hopper
- Written by: Gerald C. Duffy
- Starring: Tom Moore; Sylvia Ashton; Naomi Childers
- Cinematography: John J. Mescall
- Production company: Goldwyn Pictures
- Distributed by: Goldwyn Pictures
- Release date: January 28, 1921
- Running time: 50 minutes
- Country: United States
- Languages: Silent; English intertitles

Hold Your Horses is a 1921 American silent comedy film directed by E. Mason Hopper and starring Tom Moore, Sylvia Ashton and Naomi Childers.

== Cast ==
- Tom Moore as Daniel Canavan
- Sylvia Ashton as Hoonora Canavan
- Naomi Childers as Beatrice Newness
- Bertram Grassby as Rodman Cadbury
- Mortimer E. Stinson as Jim James
- Sidney Ainsworth as Horace Slayton

== Bibliography ==
- Munden, Kenneth White. The American Film Institute Catalog of Motion Pictures Produced in the United States, Part 1. University of California Press, 1997.
