= Otto Hoffman =

American actor

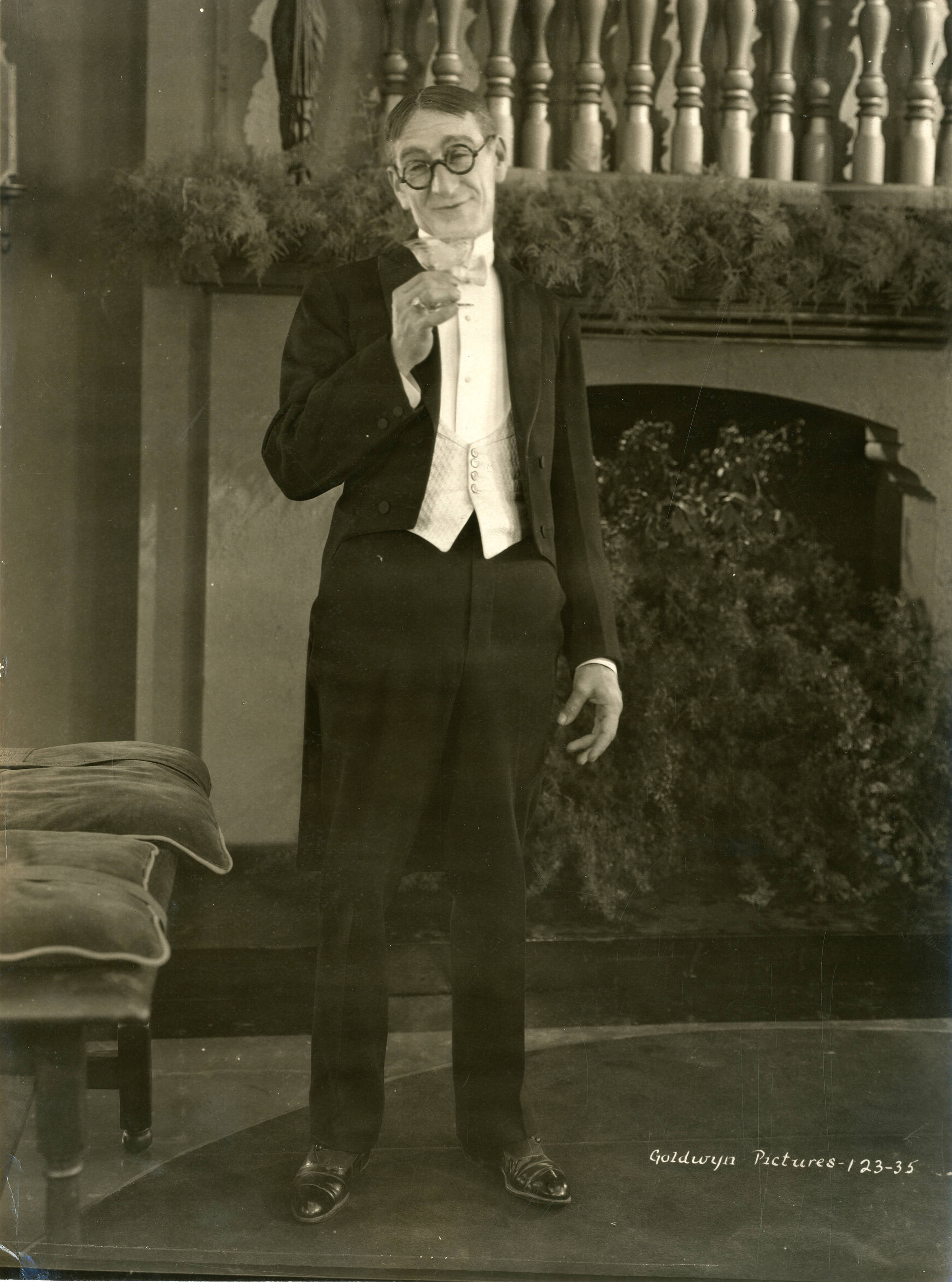
- Hoffman in 1922
- Born: Otto F. Hoffman; May 2, 1879; New York City, U.S.
- Died: June 23, 1944 (aged 65); Los Angeles, California, U.S.
- Occupation: Actor
- Years active: 1915–1944

Otto F. Hoffman (May 2, 1879 – June 23, 1944) was an American film actor. He appeared in almost 200 films between 1915 and 1944. He was born in New York City and died in Los Angeles, California, from lung cancer.

Hoffman's Broadway credits include The Strange Woman (1913), The Spring Maid (1910), and A Broken Idol (1909). He was also active in stock theater productions. Hoffman debuted in film in 1906 in a production of the Edison Company in New York. Later he worked for Goldwyn Pictures.

== Partial filmography ==
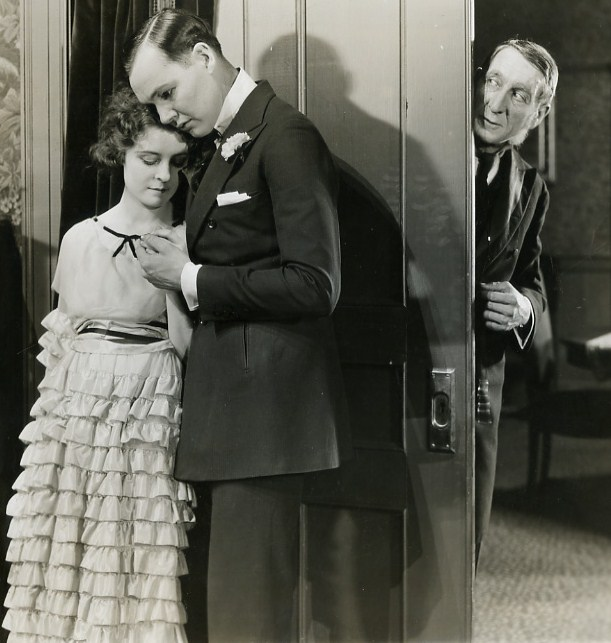
Hoffman (right) in Homer Comes Home (1920)

- The Haunted Bedroom (1919)
- The Egg Crate Wallop (1919)
- Behind the Door (1919)
- Homer Comes Home (1920)
- Stop Thief! (1920)
- The Jailbird (1920)
- The Great Accident (1920)
- Silk Hosiery (1920)
- Who Am I? (1921)
- Bunty Pulls the Strings (1921)
- The Bronze Bell (1921)
- The Devil Within (1921)
- Mr. Barnes of New York (1922)
- Trimmed (1922)
- The Sin Flood (1922)
- Ridin' Wild (1922)
- A Dangerous Game (1922)
- The Bootlegger's Daughter (1922)
- Confidence (1922)
- Very Truly Yours (1922)
- The Glorious Fool (1922)
- The New Teacher (1922)
- Double Dealing (1923)
- Strangers of the Night (1923)
- One Stolen Night (1923)
- Human Wreckage (1923)
- Lucretia Lombard (1923)
- The Price She Paid (1924)
- Arizona Express (1924)
- High Speed (1924)
- Secrets of the Night (1924)
- The Dixie Handicap (1924)
- Confessions of a Queen (1925)
- Bobbed Hair (1925)
- Satan in Sables (1925)
- Millionaires (1926)
- More Pay, Less Work (1926)
- The Stolen Bride (1927)
- Painted Ponies (1927)
- The Fourflusher (1928)
- Rinty of the Desert (1928)
- The Terror (1928)
- Noah's Ark (1928)
- The Charge of the Gauchos (1928)
- The Grain of Dust (1928)
- Hardboiled Rose (1929)
- The Desert Song (1929)
- On with the Show! (1929)
- The Hottentot (1929)
- Is Everybody Happy? (1929)
- Acquitted (1929)
- The Other Tomorrow (1930)
- Sinners' Holiday (1930)
- Downstairs (1932)
- The Dark Horse (1932)
- Haunted Gold (1932)
- The County Fair (1932)
- The Iron Master (1933)
- Kid Millions (1934)
- Marrying Widows (1934)
- Death Takes a Holiday - (1934)
- Big Calibre (1935)
- Fighting Shadows (1935)
- The Great Hotel Murder (1935)
- Girl Loves Boy (1937)
- Hideaway (1937)
- The Blue Bird (1940)
- Red River Robin Hood (1942)
