= A Man and His Money =

1919 film directed by Harry Beaumont

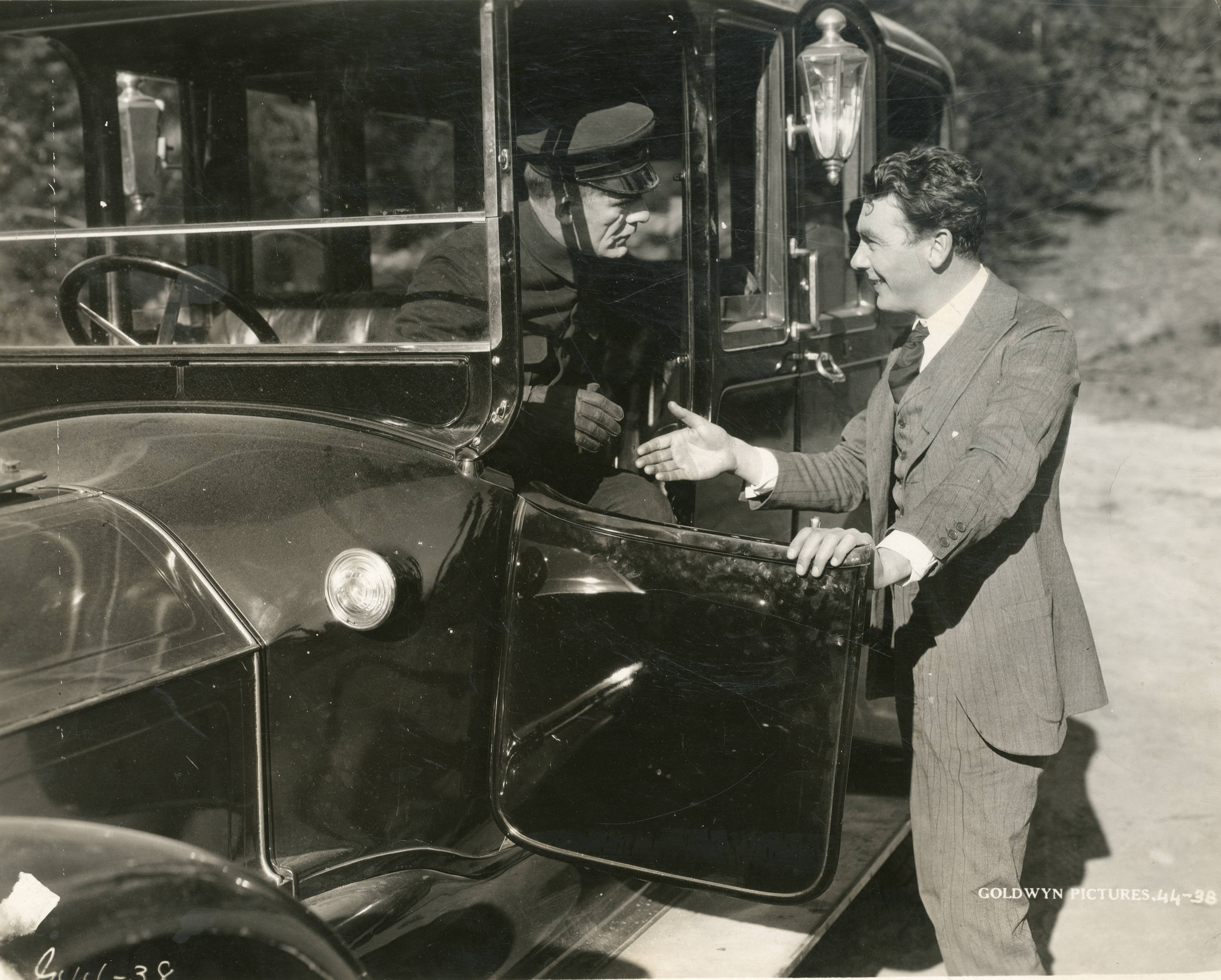
- Still with Eddie Sturgis and Tom Moore
- Directed by: Harry Beaumont
- Written by: Frederic S. Isham
- Produced by: Samuel Goldwyn
- Starring: Tom Moore; Seena Owen
- Cinematography: George Webber
- Distributed by: Goldwyn Pictures
- Release date: April 13, 1919
- Running time: 50 minutes
- Country: United States
- Language: Sielnt (English intertitles)

A Man and His Money is a 1919 American silent comedy film directed by Harry Beaumont and starring Tom Moore and Seena Owen. It was produced and distributed by Goldwyn Pictures.

== Plot ==
Betty Dalrymple doesn't approve of her millionaire fiance's, Harry Lathrop, methods of spending frivolously and living aimlessly. When he is supposed to escort her to a dinner, he appears both tipsy and under-dressed, and she breaks off their engagement. Once he sobers up, he contacts his lawyer and they make it so that he can't touch his millions until he has been able to make a living on his own. Moving far away from his mansion, he answers an ad requesting the services of a handy man, who is to look after dogs. He discovers that the ad was placed by Betty's wealthy aunt, and that Betty just so happens to be paying her a visit. Her persistent suitor, Walter Randall, appears at her home and tries to woo her, which she rebukes. He visits frequently but is always refused, so he lures her to his hunting lodge and attacks her. Harry has been trailing them, and fights off Randall and his chauffeur, rescuing Betty from their advances. She has a change of heart towards Harry and embraces him, just as the skies open up and rain drenches their figures.

== Cast ==
- Tom Moore as Harry Lathrop
- Seena Owen as Betty Dalrymple
- Sidney Ainsworth as Walter Randall
- Kate Lester as Mrs. Johnston DeLong
- Claire Du Brey as Varda Ropers
- Sydney Deane as John Sturgeon
- Eddie Sturgis as Chauffeur

== Production ==
Exterior scenes were filmed at Little Bear Lake.

== Reception ==
Motion Picture News gave it a mixed review, finding the story unoriginal but the performance of Tom Moore and the production worth watching the film for.

The Moving Picture World's review came to a similar conclusion, finding that Betty's affection for Harry even after breaking off their engagement was "seriously weakening the slender thread of curiosity as to the outcome on which sustained interest depends."

Exhibitor's Herald was positive, describing the film as being a "picture rich in technical and artistic merit."

== Preservation ==
A complete copy of A Man and His Money is held at the Museum of Modern Art (MOMA), New York.
