= Very Truly Yours =

1922 silent film

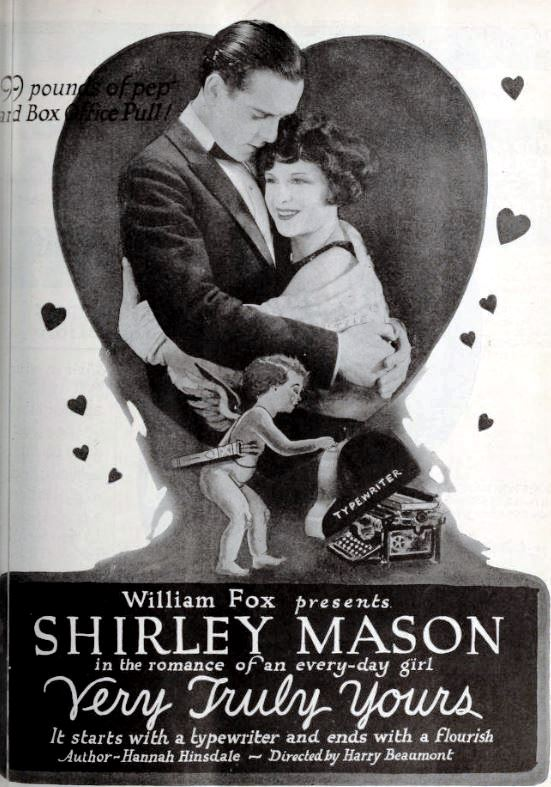
- Directed by: Harry Beaumont
- Written by: Hannah Hinsdale; Paul Schofield
- Produced by: William Fox
- Starring: Shirley Mason; Allan Forrest; Charles Clary
- Cinematography: John Arnold
- Production company: Fox Film
- Distributed by: Fox Film
- Release date: April 30, 1922
- Running time: 50 minutes
- Country: United States
- Languages: Silent; English intertitles

Very Truly Yours is a 1922 American silent romance film directed by Harry Beaumont and starring Shirley Mason, Allan Forrest and Charles Clary.

== Cast ==
- Shirley Mason as Marie Tyree
- Allan Forrest as Bert Woodmansee
- Charles Clary as A.L. Woodmansee
- Otto Hoffman as Jim Watson
- Harold Miller as Archie Small
- Helen Raymond as Mrs. Evelyn Grenfall
- Hardee Kirkland as Dr. Maddox

== Bibliography ==
- James Robert Parish & Michael R. Pitts. Film directors: a guide to their American films. Scarecrow Press, 1974.
