= The Great Accident =

1920 silent film

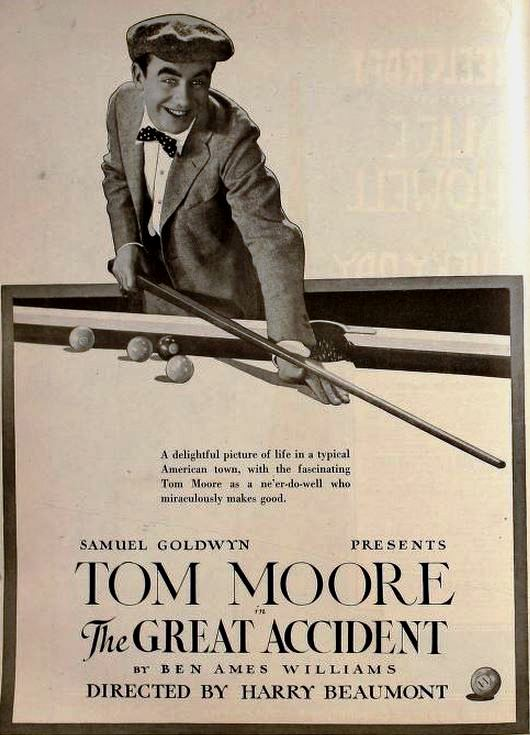
- Directed by: Harry Beaumont
- Written by: Ben Ames Williams (novel); Edfrid A. Bingham
- Produced by: Samuel Goldwyn
- Starring: Tom Moore; Jane Novak; Willard Louis
- Cinematography: Norbert Brodine
- Production company: Goldwyn Pictures
- Distributed by: Goldwyn Distributing
- Release date: June 4, 1920
- Running time: 60 minutes
- Country: United States
- Languages: Silent; English intertitles

The Great Accident is a 1920 American silent drama film directed by Harry Beaumont and starring Tom Moore, Jane Novak and Willard Louis.

== Cast ==
- Tom Moore as Wint Chase
- Jane Novak as Joan Caretall
- Andrew Robson as Winthrop Chase
- Willard Louis as Amos Caretall
- Lillian Langdon as Mrs. Winthrop Chase
- Ann Forrest as Hetty Morfee
- Philo McCullough as Jack Routt
- Otto Hoffman as V.R. Kite
- Roy Laidlaw as Peter Gergeu
- Edward McWade as Williams
- Don Bailey as Sheriff
- Maurice 'Lefty' Flynn as Sam O'Brien

== Bibliography ==
- Langman, Larry. American Film Cycles: The Silent Era. Greenwood Publishing, 1998.
