= Skinner's Baby =

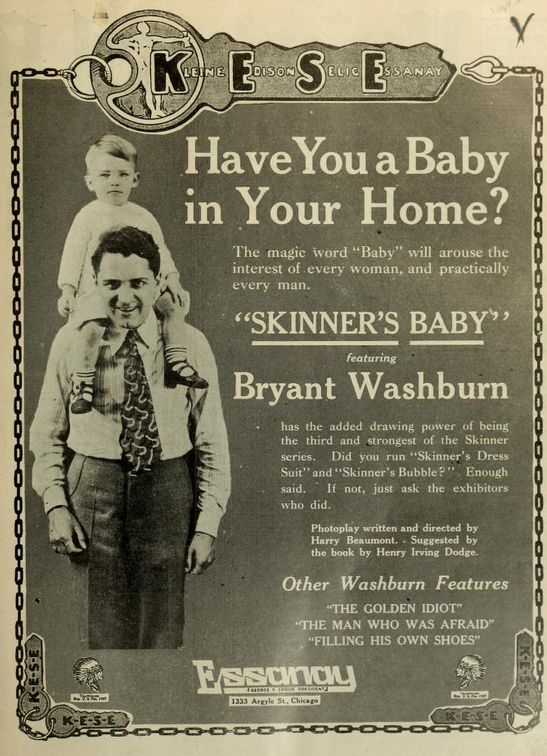
- Advertisement
- Directed by: Harry Beaumont
- Starring: Bryant Washburn; Hazel Daly; James C. Carroll; U.K. Haupt
- Production company: Essanay Film Manufacturing Company
- Distributed by: K-E-S-E
- Release date: August 6, 1917
- Running time: 65 minutes
- Country: United States
- Language: Silent (English intertitles)

Skinner's Baby is a lost 1917 American silent comedy film starring Bryant Washburn, Hazel Daly, James C. Carroll, and U.K. Haupt. This film projected Washburn out of obscurity; it was quite a success. It was Jackie Coogan's first film role, as the baby, though uncredited.

It was released on August 6, 1917, and loosely based on the story by Henry Irving Dodge. The movie was the third of a Skinner series for Washburn, with Skinner's Dress Suit coming first in January 1917, followed by Skinner's Bubble and Skinner's Baby, all in the same year.

== Plot ==
William Skinner, seeing the joy of his head bookkeeper over the arrival of a baby boy, realizes he is missing life's greatest opportunity. Everywhere they go, he and his wife run into parents and their babies, litters of puppies, and broods of ducklings. He talks about wanting children with Honey and a little time later she confides a secret to him. The day of the great event Skinner is informed of the arrival of "William Manning Skinner, Jr." He rushes out to buy every toy a baby could want, but arriving home, he finds it is a baby girl, but is elated nonetheless.

== Cast ==
- Bryant Washburn as William Manning Skinner
- Hazel Daly as Honey
- James C. Carroll as McLaughlin
- U.K. Haupt as Perkins
- Jackie Coogan as the baby (uncredited)

== Reception ==
Motography wrote that while the film "lacks the plot material of the earlier releases, it contains enough of human interest to 'get by' easily with most audiences." Variety concluded that it was "a sweet wholesome picture with little touches of sentiment interwoven that tug at the heart strings, a feature that provides clean, pleasurable entertainment." Exhibitors Herald's review was positive, the reviewer finding the number of children "enough to satisfy anybody."

== Preservation ==
With no holdings located in archives, Skinner's Baby is considered a lost film.
