= Heartsease (film) =

1919 silent film

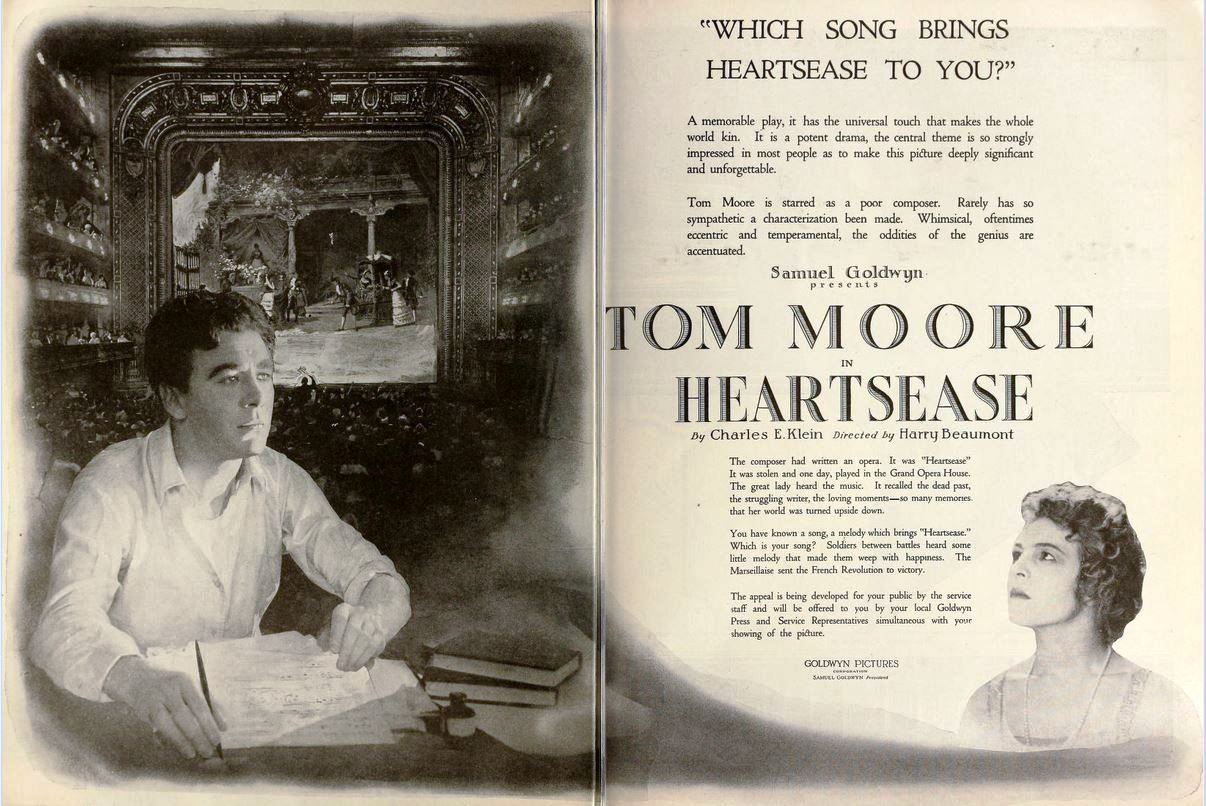
- Trade advertisement
- Directed by: Harry Beaumont
- Written by: Edfrid A. Bingham
- Based on: Heartsease by Joseph I.C. Clarke and Charles Klein
- Starring: Tom Moore; Helene Chadwick; Larry Steers
- Cinematography: Sam Landers
- Production company: Goldwyn Pictures
- Distributed by: Goldwyn Distributing
- Release date: August 24, 1919
- Running time: 50 minutes
- Country: United States
- Language: Silent (English intertitles)

Heartsease is a 1919 American silent drama film directed by Harry Beaumont and starring Tom Moore, Helene Chadwick, and Larry Steers.

== Cast ==
- Tom Moore as Eric Temple
- Helene Chadwick as Margaret Neville
- Larry Steers as Captain O'Hara
- Alec B. Francis as Lord Neville
- Sidney Ainsworth as Sir Geoffrey Pomfret
- Herbert Prior as Major Twombley
- William Burress as Peter Padbury
- Rosemary Theby as Lady Neville
- Mary Warren as Alice Temple

== Preservation ==
No known copies of the film survive.

== Bibliography ==
- Donald W. McCaffrey & Christopher P. Jacobs. Guide to the Silent Years of American Cinema. Greenwood Publishing, 1999. ISBN 0-313-30345-2
