= Hazel Daly =

American film actress

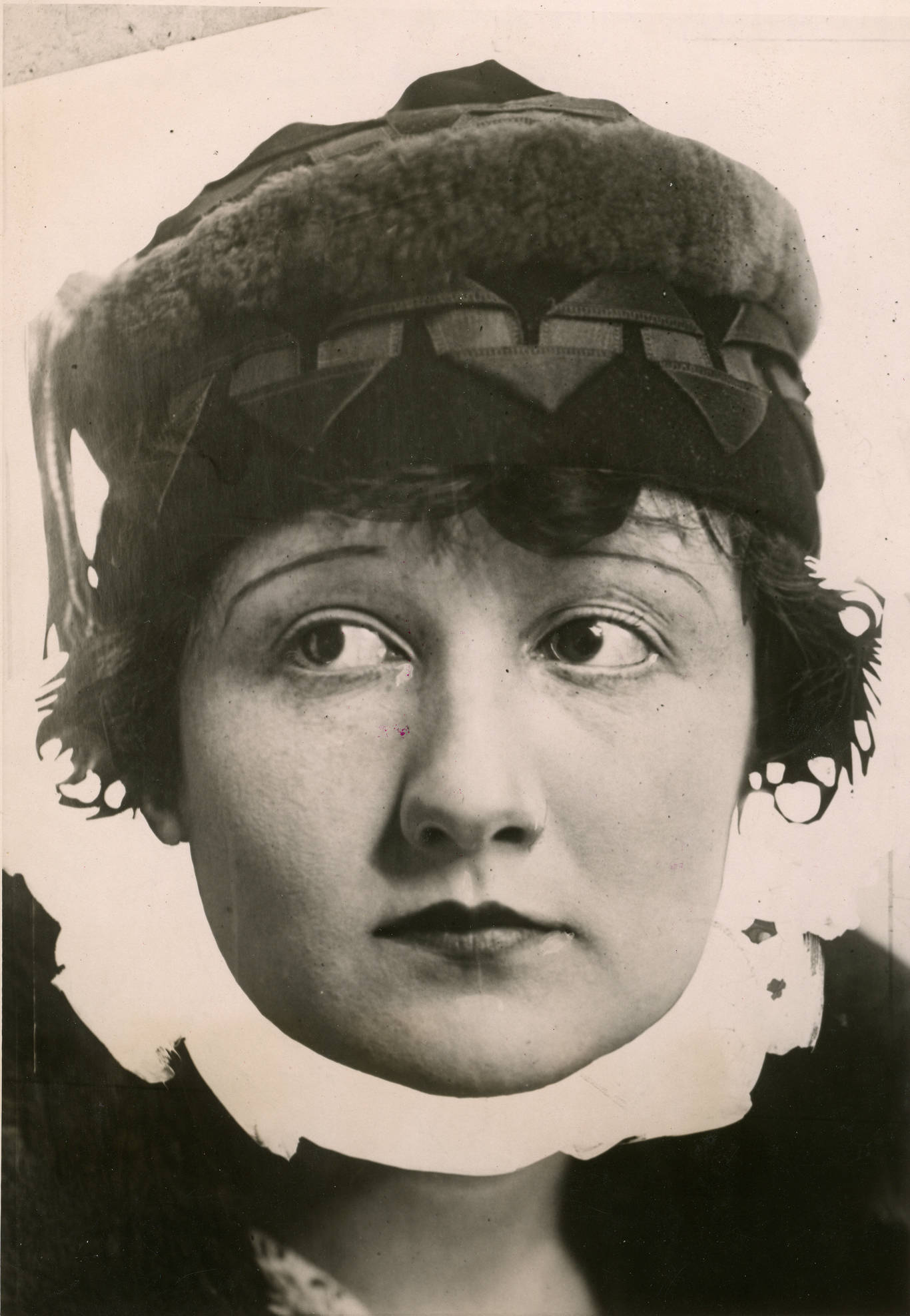
- Hazel Daly in 1922
- Born: Geraldine Daly; October 8, 1895; Chicago, Illinois, U.S.
- Died: January 2, 1987 (aged 91); Santa Monica, California, U.S.
- Occupation: Actress
- Years active: 1915–1921
- Spouse: Harry Beaumont
- Children: 2

Geraldine "Hazel" Daly (October 8, 1895 – January 2, 1987) was an American film actress.

Daly was born on October 8, 1895, in Chicago, Illinois, U.S. and died on January 2, 1987, in Santa Monica, California, at the age of 91. She appeared in 18 films.

She married Harry Beaumont and had twin daughters Anne and Geraldine, born in 1922.

== Filmography ==
- Boys Will Be Boys (1915)
- The Tenderfoot's Triumph (1915) – Hazel – the Ranchman's Daughter
- The Impersonation of Tom (1915) – Hazel
- Shooting Up the Movies (1916) – Hazel
- Skinner's Dress Suit (1917) – Honey
- A Four Cent Courtship (1917) – Miriam York
- Satan's Private Door (1917) – Anne Vance
- Skinner's Bubble (1917) – Honey
- Filling His Own Shoes (1917) – Ruth Downing
- Mr. Pringle and Success (1917) – Doris Pringle
- A Corner in Smiths (1917) – Isobel Smith
- Skinner's Baby (1917) – Honey
- Brown of Harvard (1918) – Evelyn Ames
- A Wild Goose Chase (1919) – Margaret Sherwood
- The Little Rowdy (1919) - Betty Hall, the little rowdy
- The Gay Lord Quex (1919) – Sophie Fullgarney
- Stop Thief! (1920) – Snatcher Nell
- Beating the Game (1921) – Nellie Brown
