= Wing Toy =

1921 film

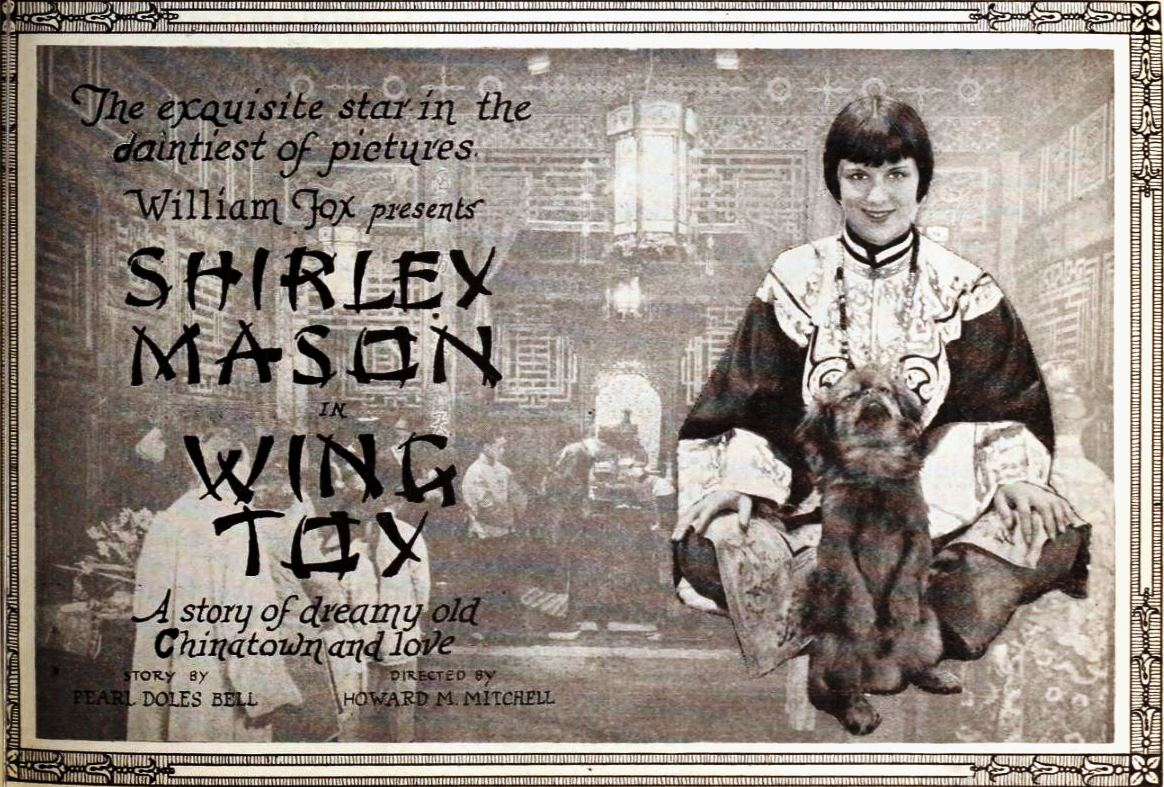
- Advertisement for the Wing Toy, on page 9 of the Exhibitors Herald (February 5, 1921)
- Directed by: Howard M. Mitchell
- Written by: Thomas Dixon Jr.
- Story by: Pearl Doles Bell
- Starring: Shirley Mason; Raymond McKee; Edward McWade; Harry Northrup; Betty Schade
- Cinematography: Glen MacWilliams
- Production company: Fox Film Corporation
- Distributed by: Fox Film Corporation
- Release date: January 30, 1921
- Running time: 6 reels
- Country: United States
- Languages: Silent film (English intertitles)

Wing Toy is a 1921 American silent drama film directed by Howard M. Mitchell and starring Shirley Mason, Raymond McKee, Edward McWade, Harry Northrup, and Betty Schade. The film was released by Fox Film Corporation on January 30, 1921.

== Cast ==
- Shirley Mason as Wing Toy
- Raymond McKee as Bob Harris
- Edward McWade as Wong
- Harry Northrup as Ye Low (as Harry S. Northrup)
- Betty Schade as White Lily
- Scott McKee as The Mole

== Censorship ==
Before Wing Toy could be exhibited in Kansas, the Kansas Board of Review required the elimination of scenes where White Lily is smoking and of Chinese men struggling with a white woman in a flashback.

== Preservation ==
It is unknown whether the film survives as no copies have been located, likely lost.
