= Stop Thief! (1920 film) =

1920 film

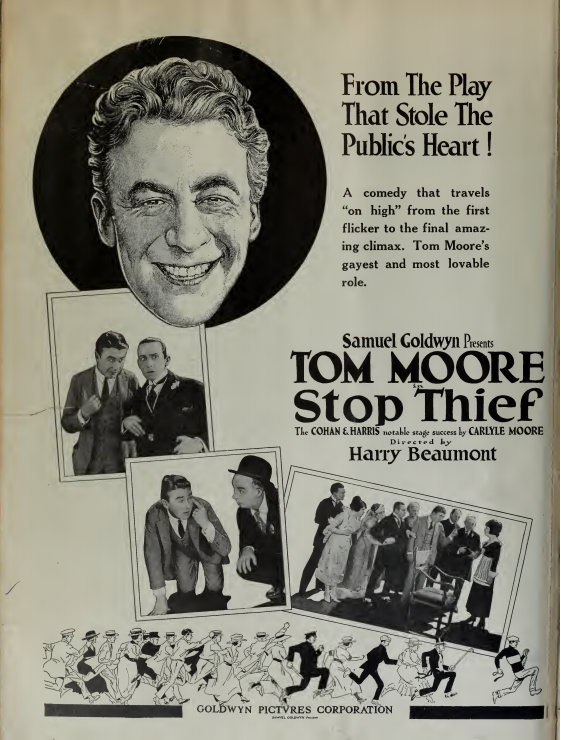
- Poster
- Directed by: Harry Beaumont
- Written by: Charles Kenyon
- Based on: Stop Thief (c. 1912) by Carlyle Moore
- Produced by: Goldwyn Pictures
- Starring: Tom Moore; Irene Rich
- Cinematography: Norbert Brodine
- Distributed by: Goldwyn Pictures
- Release date: August 1920
- Running time: 6 reels
- Country: United States
- Language: Silent (English intertitles)

Stop Thief! is an extant 1920 American silent comedy drama film directed by Harry Beaumont and starring Tom Moore and Irene Rich. It was produced and distributed by the Goldwyn Pictures company.

== Cast ==
- Tom Moore - Jack Dougan
- Hazel Daly - Snatcher Nell
- Irene Rich - Madge Carr
- Kate Lester - Mrs. Carr
- Molly Malone - Joan Carr
- Edward McWade - Mr. Carr
- Raymond Hatton -James Cluney
- Harris Gordon - Dr. Willoughby
- Henry Ralston - Reverend Spelvin
- John Lince - Detective Thompson
- Maurice Flynn - Police Sergeant

uncredited

- Otto Hoffman -
- James Neill -
- Andre Robson -

== Preservation status ==
A complete copy of the film is preserved at the George Eastman Museum.
