= Dodging a Million =

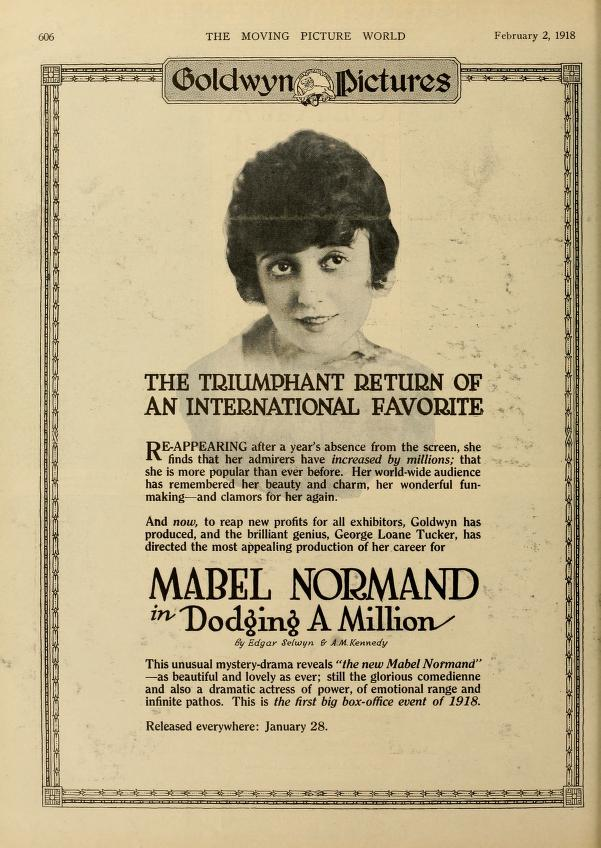
- 1918 magazine ad
- Directed by: George Loane Tucker
- Written by: Edgar Selwyn; A. M. Kennedy; George Loane Tucker
- Starring: Mabel Normand
- Cinematography: Oliver T. Marsh
- Production company: Goldwyn Pictures Corporation
- Distributed by: Goldwyn Distributing Corporation
- Release date: January 28, 1918
- Running time: 6 reels
- Country: United States
- Language: Silent

Dodging a Million is a 1918 American comedy film starring Mabel Normand and Tom Moore, directed by George Loane Tucker, written by A. M. Kennedy, Edgar Selwyn, and Loane, and photographed by Oliver T. Marsh. The black and white silent film was released by the Goldwyn Pictures Corporation. It is not known whether the film currently survives, and it may be a lost film.

== Plot ==
As described in a film magazine, employed as a mannequin, Arabella Flynn decides to have one good time and so with gown and coat belonging to her employer she goes to a fashionable restaurant where she attracts the attention of Jack Forsythe. During her meal her employer comes into the place so Arabella rushes pell mell into the street. Arriving at her boarding house, she finds that she has fallen heir to a fortune. She immediately goes to a fashionable hotel where, because of her inheritance, she is the center of attention. After several fashionable shops have given her their wares and extended unlimited credit, they learn a mistake has been made in her check and flock immediately to her hotel to demand payment. In the midst of her trouble Arabella learns that the only mistake made is in the size of her check. After she has reassured her creditors, she agrees to become the wife of Jack.

== Cast ==
- Mabel Normand as Arabella Flynn
- Tom Moore as Jack Forsythe
- J. Herbert Frank as Signor Rodrigues
- Shirley Aubert as Forelady
- Rita Dane as Luella
- Norah Sprague as Luella's Friend
- Bruce Biddle as Lawyer's Clerk
- Armand Cortes as Raquin
