= Filling His Own Shoes =

1917 silent film

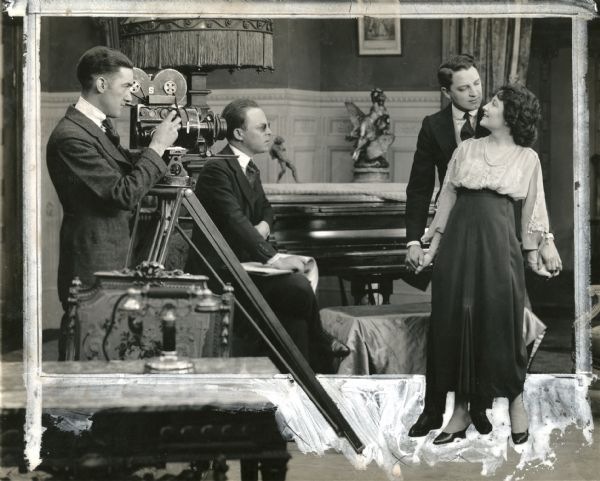
- Directed by: Harry Beaumont
- Written by: Henry C. Rowland (novel); Harry Beaumont
- Starring: Bryant Washburn; Hazel Daly; Rod La Rocque
- Cinematography: Will E. Smith
- Production company: Essanay Pictures
- Distributed by: K-E-S-E Service
- Release date: June 11, 1917
- Running time: 65 minutes
- Country: United States
- Languages: Silent; English intertitles

Filling His Own Shoes is a 1917 American silent comedy film directed by Harry Beaumont and starring Bryant Washburn, Hazel Daly and Rod La Rocque.

== Cast ==
- Bryant Washburn as William Ruggles
- Hazel Daly as Ruth Downing
- Rod La Rocque as Dick Downing
- Lyda Dalzell as Dorothea Westbrooke
- Virginia Valli as Roxana
- Helen Ferguson as Rosa
- Louise Long as Bulbul

== Bibliography ==
- Goble, Alan. The Complete Index to Literary Sources in Film. Walter de Gruyter, 1999.
