= Tom Moore (actor) =

Irish-American actor and film director (1883–1955)

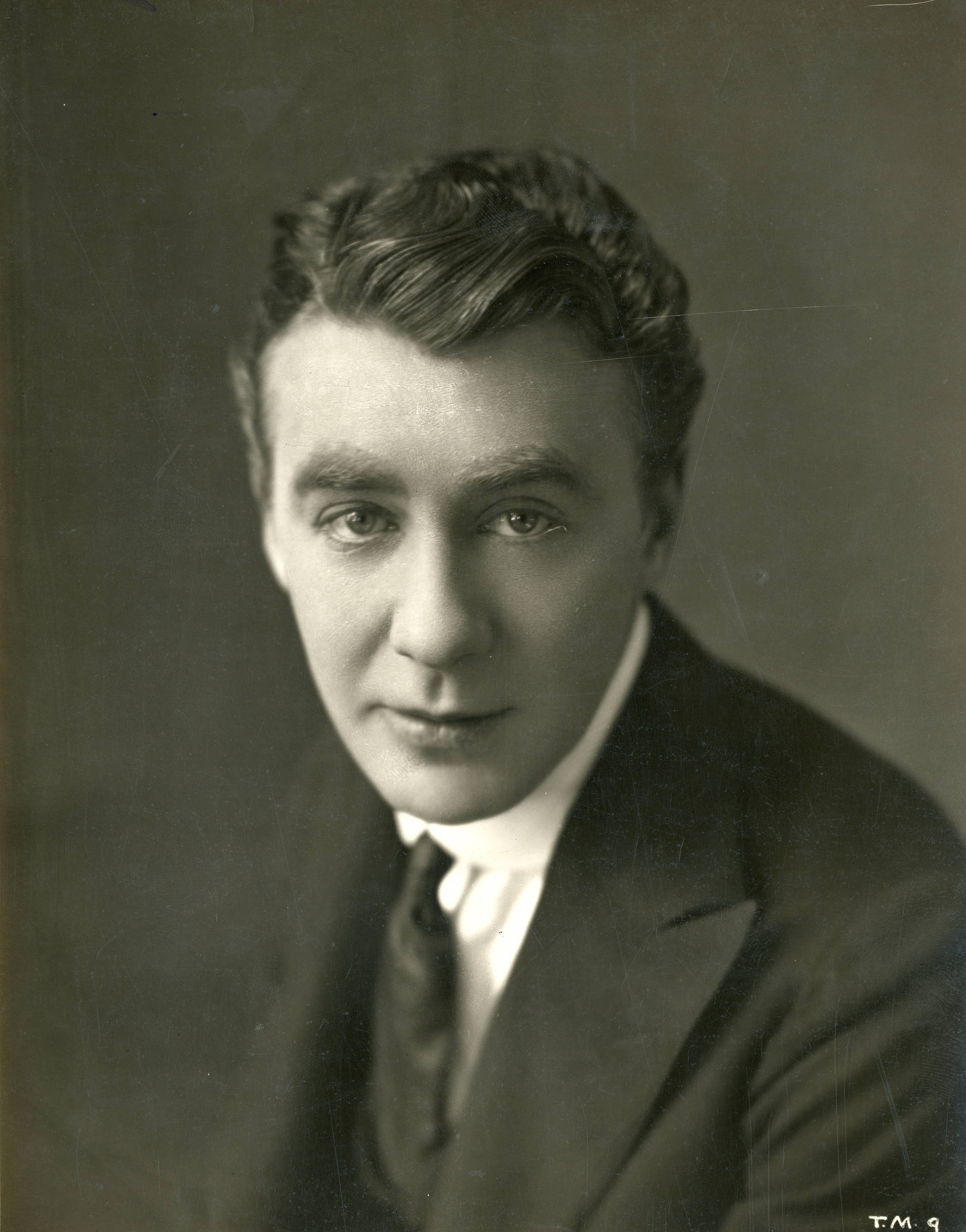
- Moore c. 1920
- Born: May 1, 1883; Fordstown Crossroads, County Meath, United Kingdom of Great Britain and Ireland (now Republic of Ireland)
- Died: February 12, 1955 (aged 71); Santa Monica, California, U.S.
- Occupation: Actor
- Years active: 1908–1954
- Spouses: Alice Joyce (m. 1914; div. 1920) Renée Adorée (m. 1921; div. 1924) Eleanor Merry (m. 1931)
- Children: 2
- Relatives: Brothers: Owen, Matt and Joe Moore

Thomas J. Moore (May 1, 1883 – February 12, 1955) was an Irish-American actor and director. He appeared in at least 186 motion pictures from 1908 to 1954. Frequently cast as the romantic lead, he starred in silent movies as well as in some of the first talkies.

Born in Fordstown Crossroads in May 1883, County Meath, Moore, along with his brothers, Owen, Matt, and Joe, and their sister Mary (1890–1919), he emigrated to the United States as a steerage passenger on board the S.S. Anchoria and was inspected on Ellis Island in May 1896. Owen and Matt also had successful movie careers. Tom Moore appeared in his first silent motion picture in 1908. He also directed 17 motion pictures in 1914 and 1915, including The Secret Room (1915).

== Personal life ==
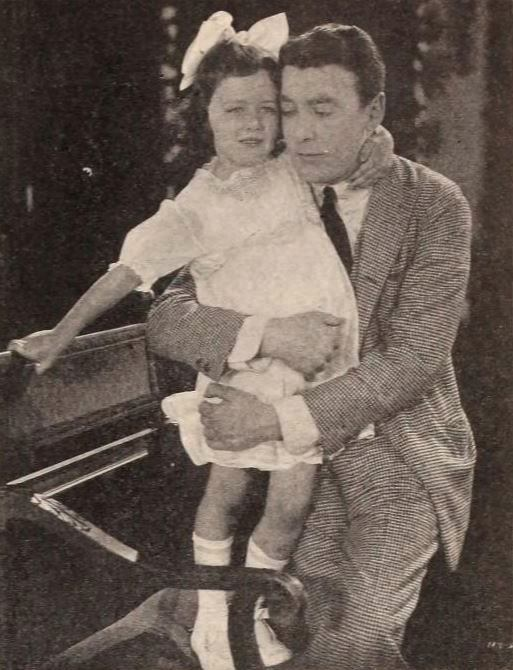
Tom Moore with daughter Alice (1920)

In 1914, he married silent star Alice Joyce, with whom he had a daughter, Alice Moore (1916–1960), who acted in six films with her father from 1934 to 1937. While in New York City on New Year's Eve 1920, Moore met the young French actress Renée Adorée. A whirlwind romance ensued, and six weeks after their meeting, on February 12, 1921, they married at his home in Beverly Hills. The marriage lasted only a few years. In 1931, Moore married a third time, to actress Eleanor Merry. His brother, Owen Moore, also an actor, was married to Mary Pickford.

The Great Depression saw many studios close and much consolidation as the motion picture industry went through tough times. Moore retired from the screen in the mid-1930s. Ten years later, he returned to act in minor supporting roles.

Tom Moore died of cancer at age 71 in Santa Monica, California. He has a star on the Hollywood Walk of Fame at 1640 Vine Street.

== Selected filmography ==
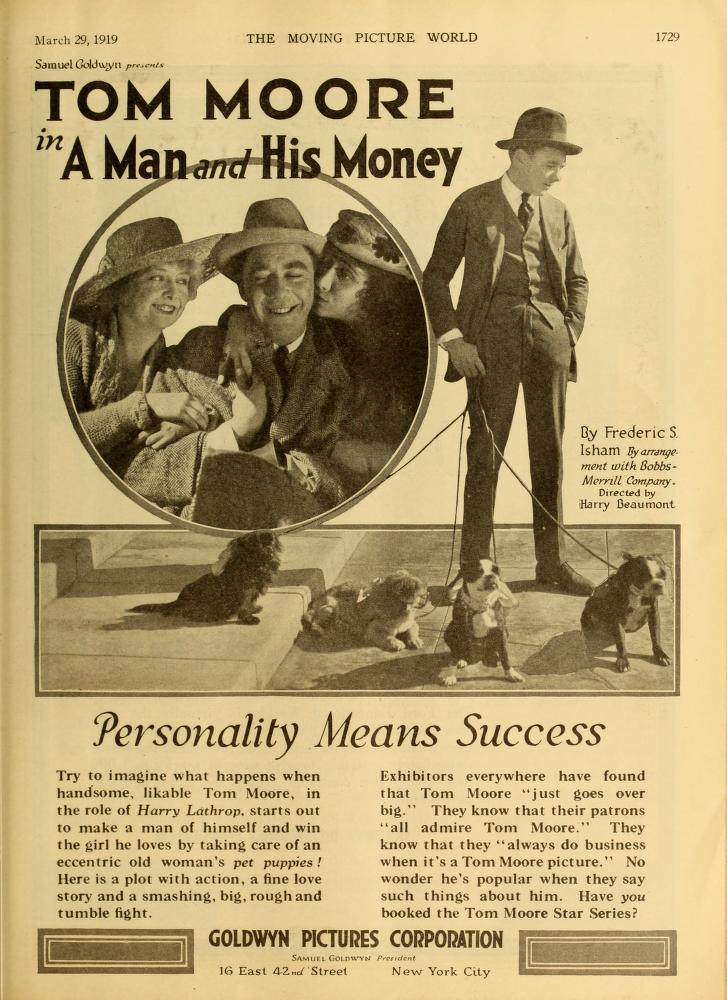
A Man and His Money (1919)

- The Christmas Burglars (1908, Short) - Customer
- The Helping Hand (1908, Short) - Man in Office / Wedding Guest
- The Criminal Hypnotist (1909, Short) - Party Guest
- The Vampire's Trail (1914, Short) - Horace Payne - a Wealthy Broker
- The Judge's Wife (1914) - Mr. Johnson
- Dollars and the Woman (1916) - Dan Hilyer
- The Primrose Ring (1917) - Bob MacLean
- The Jaguar's Claws (1917) - Phil Jordan
- The Lesson (1917) - Chet Vernon
- Little Miss Optimist (1917) - Deal Hendrie
- The Wild Girl (1917) - Donald MacDonald
- The Cinderella Man (1917) - Anthony Quintard
- Dodging a Million (1918) - Jack Forsythe
- Go West, Young Man (1918) - Dick Latham
- The Floor Below (1918) - Hunter Mason
- The Danger Game (1918) - Jimmy Gilpin
- The Fair Pretender (1918) - Don Meredith
- Just for Tonight (1918) - Theodore Whitney Jr.
- The Kingdom of Youth (1918) - Jimmy Betts
- Thirty a Week (1918) - Dan Murray
- Brown of Harvard (1918) - Tom Brown
- A Man and His Money (1919) - Harry Lathrop
- One of the Finest (1919) - Larry Hayes
- The City of Comrades (1919) - Frank Melbury
- Heartsease (1919) - Eric Temple
- Lord and Lady Algy (1919) - Lord Algy
- Toby's Bow (1919) - Tom Blake
- The Gay Lord Quex (1919) - The Marquis of Quex
- Duds (1920) - Phoebe Plunkett
- The Great Accident (1920) - Wint Chase
- Stop Thief! (1920) - Jack Dougan
- Officer 666 (1920) - Travers Gladwyn
- Hold Your Horses (1921) - Daniel Canavan
- Made in Heaven (1921) - William Lowry
- Beating the Game (1921) - 'Fancy Charlie'
- From the Ground Up (1921) - Terence Giluley
- Mr. Barnes of New York (1922) - Mr. Barnes
- Over the Border (1922) - Sgt. Flaherty
- The Cowboy and the Lady (1922) - Teddy North
- Pawned (1922) - John Bruce
- The Harbour Lights (1923) - Lieutenant David Kingsley
- Mary of the Movies (1923) - Himself (uncredited)
- Marriage Morals (1923) - Young Harry Ryan
- Rouged Lips (1923) - James Patterson III
- Big Brother (1923) - Jimmy Donovan
- Manhandled (1924) - Jim Hogan
- One Night in Rome (1924) - Richard Oak
- Dangerous Money (1924) - Tim Sullivan
- Adventure (1925) - David Sheldon
- On Thin Ice (1925) - Charles White
- Pretty Ladies (1925) - Al Cassidy
- Under the Rouge (1925) - Whitey
- The Trouble with Wives (1925) - William Hyatt
- A Kiss for Cinderella (1925) - Prince Charming (Policeman)
- The Song and Dance Man (1926) - Happy Farrell
- Good and Naughty (1926) - Gerald Gray
- The Clinging Vine (1926) - Jimmie Bancroft
- Syncopating Sue (1926) - Eddie Murphy
- Cabaret (1927) - Tom Westcott
- The Love Thrill (1927) - Jack Sturdevant
- The Wise Wife (1927) - John Blaisdell
- The Siren (1927) - Peter Dane
- Anybody Here Seen Kelly? (1928) - Pat Kelly
- His Last Haul (1928) - Joe Hammond
- The Yellowback (1929) - O'Mara
- Side Street (1929) - Jimmy O'Farrell
- The Woman Racket (1930) - Tom
- The Costello Case (1930) - Mahoney
- The Last Parade (1931) - Mike O'Dowd
- Stout Hearts and Willing Hands (1931, Short) - Lookalike Bartender 2
- Cannonball Express (1932) - John Logan
- Men Are Such Fools (1932) - Tom Hyland
- Neighbors' Wives (1933) - John McGrath
- Bombay Mail (1934) - Civil Surgeon
- The Dark Angel (1935) - Hunt Guest (uncredited)
- Robin Hood of El Dorado (1936) - Sheriff Hannan (uncredited)
- Trouble for Two (1936) - Major O'Rook
- Parole! (1936) - Carmody (uncredited)
- The Girl on the Front Page (1936) - Brace (uncredited)
- Reunion (1936) - Dr. Richard Sheridan
- Ten Laps to Go (1936) - Mr. Corbett - Norma's Father
- Behind Green Lights (1946) - Metcalfe (uncredited)
- The Shocking Miss Pilgrim (1947) - Office Clerk (uncredited)
- Moss Rose (1947) - Coroner's Foreman (uncredited)
- Mother Wore Tights (1947) - Man (uncredited)
- Forever Amber (1947) - Killigrew (uncredited)
- Scudda Hoo! Scudda Hay! (1948) - Judge Stillwell (uncredited)
- The Walls of Jericho (1948) - Minor Role (uncredited)
- Cry of the City (1948) - Doctor (uncredited)
- Road House (1948) - Foreman (uncredited)
- The Fighting O'Flynn (1949) - Tavernkeeper
- The Redhead and the Cowboy (1951) - Gus
- The Turning Point (1952) - Drugstore Owner (uncredited)
- The Great Diamond Robbery (1954) - Seedy Man (uncredited)
- Return from the Sea (1954) - Minor Role (uncredited)
- The Human Jungle (1954) - Witness at Murder Scene (uncredited)
