= Ullrich Haupt (actor, born 1887) =

American actor

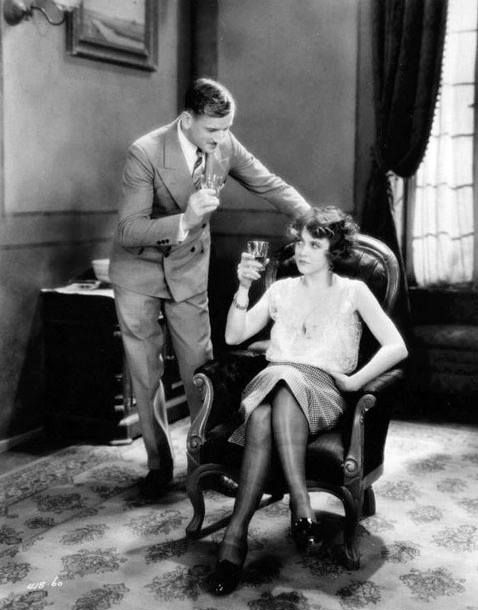
- Haupt and Ruth Chatterton in Madame X (1929)
- Born: 8 August 1887; Falkenburg, German Empire
- Died: 5 August 1931 (aged 43); Santa Monica, California, United States
- Occupation: Film actor
- Years active: 1915–1931

Ullrich Haupt (8 August 1887 – 5 August 1931) was a German actor who rose to prominence in Hollywood films. He was the father of Ullrich Haupt Jr., who was also an actor.

== Filmography ==
Year	Title	Role	Notes
1916	The Truant Soul	Dr. Jenkins	Film debut
1917	The Little Shoes	Vasili Arloff	
1917	Skinner's Dress Suit	Perkins	
1917	Satan's Private Door	Richard Vance	
1917	Skinner's Bubble	Perkins	
1917	Skinner's Baby	Perkins	
1917	The Kill-Joy	The Denver Kid	
1928	Tempest	The Captain	
1928	Captain Swagger	Von Dictor	
1929	The Iron Mask	De Rochefort	
1929	The Far Call	London Nick	
1929	Wonder of Women	Kurt	
1929	The Greene Murder Case	Dr. Arthur Von Blon	
1929	Madame X	Laroque	
1929	Frozen Justice	Captain Jones	
1930	A Royal Romance	Count von Baden	
1930	The Bad One	Pierre Ferrande	
1930	The Rogue Song	Prince Serge	
1930	Three Faces East	German Colonel	Uncredited
1930	Du Barry, Woman of Passion	Jean Du Barry	
1930	Morocco	Adjutant Caesar	
1930	Viennese Nights	Hugo - Elsa's Rejected Suitor	Uncredited
1931	The Man Who Came Back	Charles Reisling	
1931	Die große Fahrt	Thorpe	
1931	The Unholy Garden	Col. von Axt	Final film
