= Brown of Harvard (1918 film) =

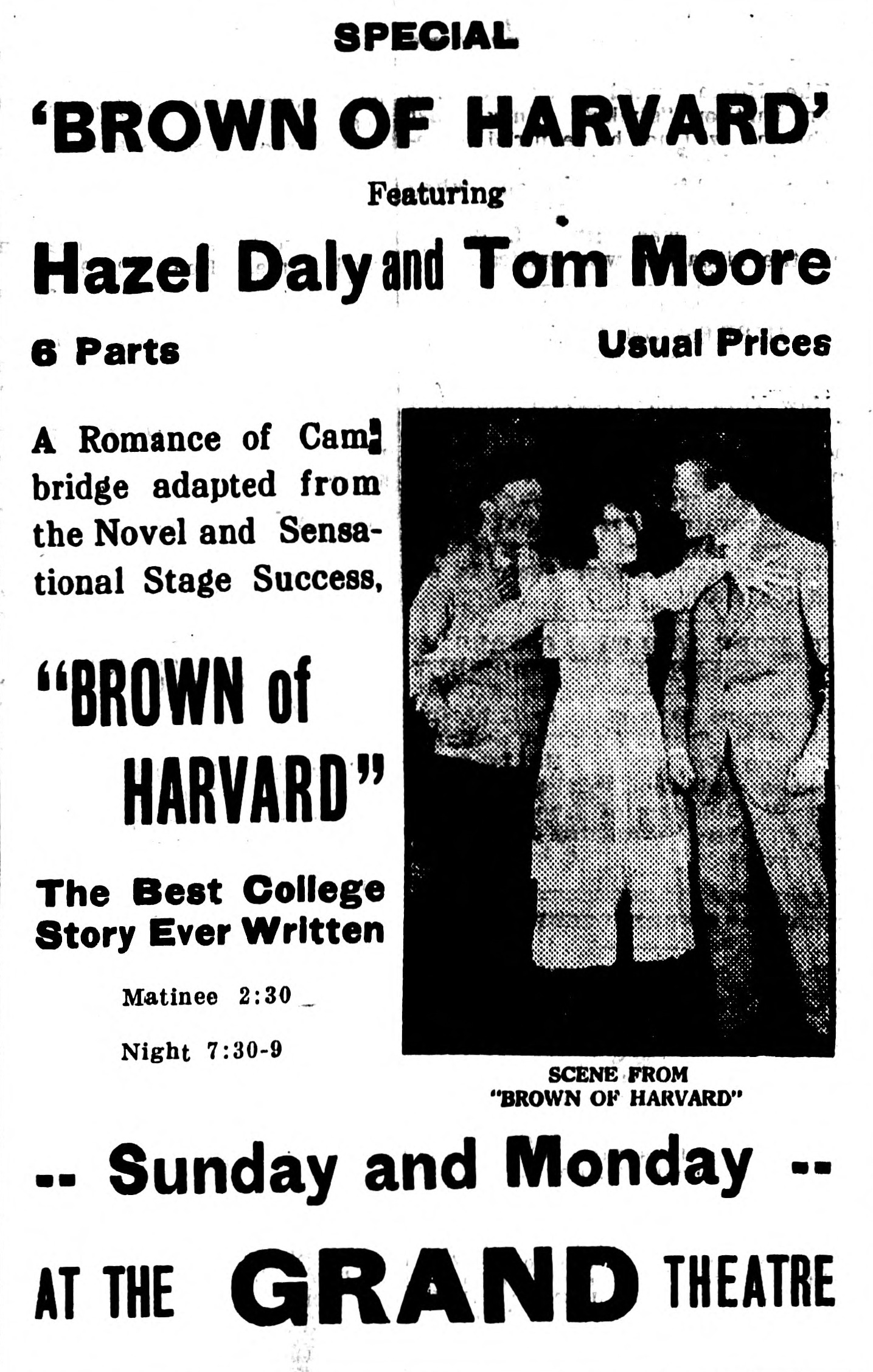
- Newspaper advertisement.
- Directed by: Harry Beaumont
- Written by: Harry Beaumont
- Based on: the 1906 play Brown of Harvard by Rida Johnson Young and the 1907 novel Brown of Harvard by Young and Gilbert Colman
- Produced by: William N. Selig
- Starring: Tom Moore; Hazel Daly
- Distributed by: Perfection Pictures (George Kleine System)
- Release date: December 27, 1918
- Running time: 6 reels
- Country: United States
- Language: Silent (English intertitles)

Brown of Harvard, also known as Tom Brown at Harvard, is a 1918 film based on the 1906 Broadway play Brown of Harvard by Rida Johnson Young and the novel by Young and Gilbert Colman. The Washington State University football team and its coach, William "Lone Star" Dietz, participated in filming while in Southern California for the 1916 Rose Bowl.

== Plot ==
As described in a film magazine, Tom Brown (Moore), a student at Harvard University, is engaged to Evelyn Ames (Daly). Her brother has become desperately involved with Marian Thorne (Winston). In an effort to protect his fiance's brother, the stigma associated with Marian Thorne's condition rests upon Tom. Evelyn breaks her engagement. Wilton Ames (Greene) crowns his borrowing of money from Tom by stealing a blank check and forging it for $300 to get Marion out of the city so that her condition may not get known. Gerald Thorne (McGrail), brother of Marian and stoke on the Harvard crew, refuses to enter the race after he is given a spurious note from his sister saying that she is leaving the city and wants to see him. Brown is put in his place and the race is won. Following the race, Gerald confronts him and charges him with being responsible for his sister's downfall. Evelyn demands that Tom marry Marian when Wilton finally confesses that he is the man involved. With Brown shown in his true light a happy reconciliation follows.

== Cast ==
- Tom Moore as Tom Brown
- Hazel Daly as Evelyn Ames
- Sidney Ainsworth as Victor Colton (credited as Sydney Ainsworth)
- Warner Richmond as Claxton Madden
- Walter McGrail as Gerald Thorne
- Nancy Winston as Marian Thorne
- Alice Gordon as Mrs. Ames
- Kempton Greene as Wilton Ames
- Francis Joyner as Cart Wright (credited as Frank Joyner)
- Frank Joyner as Cart Wright
- Robert Ellis as 'Bud' Hall
- Lydia Dalzell as Edith Sinclair
- Walter Hiers as Tubby
- Arthur Housman as Happy (credited as Arthur Hausman)
- Johnnie Walker as Jean
- William "Lone Star" Dietz Football Player (uncredited)
