= Edward McWade =

American actor

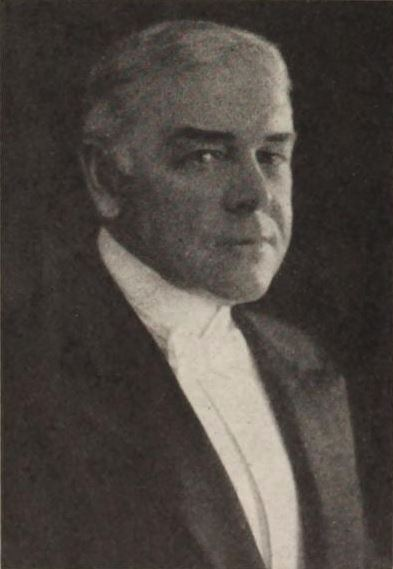
- From a 1920 magazine
- Born: January 14, 1865; Washington, D.C. U.S.
- Died: May 17, 1943 (aged 78); Los Angeles, California, U.S.
- Occupations: Actor, screenwriter
- Years active: 1889-1943
- Spouse: Margaret May Fish (m. 1897)

Edward McWade (January 14, 1865 – May 17, 1943) was an American actor, and screenwriter.

== Biography ==
McWade was born in Washington, D.C., on January 14, 1865. His father was notable stage actor Robert McWade Sr. (1835–1913) and his younger brother was character actor Robert McWade Jr.

On September 4, 1897, McWade married actress Margaret May Fish. They performed in a number of stage and film productions together both before and after they were married.

McWade appeared in more than 130 films between 1919 and 1944, mostly in secondary roles. He also wrote 15 stage plays and silent films scripts between 1897 and 1914.

McWade died in Los Angeles, California.

== Selected filmography ==
- Uncle Tom's Cabin (1914)
- Hornet's Nest (1919) - Wimms
- When a Man Loves (1919) - Takamura
- Dangerous Days (1920) - Dr. Haverford
- The Great Accident (1920) - Williams
- Stop Thief! (1920) - Mr. Carr
- The Husband Hunter (1920) - Charles Mack
- Wing Toy (1921) - Wong
- Pals of the West (1922) - Lee Wong
- The Strangers' Banquet (1922) - Harriman
- The Town Scandal (1923) - Avery Crawford
- The Monster (1925) - Luke Watson
- The Big Gamble (1931) - Justice of the Peace (uncredited)
- The Big Shot (1931) - Uncle Ira
- The Crowd Roars (1932) - Tom Beal - Counterman (uncredited)
- Two Seconds (1932) - The Prison Doctor
- Love Is a Racket (1932) - Messenger (uncredited)
- Big City Blues (1932) - Baggage Master (uncredited)
- Six Hours to Live (1932) - Ivan
- The Son-Daughter (1932) - Sin Kai's Servant (uncredited)
- Lawyer Man (1932) - Moyle (uncredited)
- The Billion Dollar Scandal (1933) - Income Tax Man (uncredited)
- Employees' Entrance (1933) - Second Fired Employee (uncredited)
- Murders in the Zoo (1933) - Dan Baker - Zoo Guard (uncredited)
- Girl Missing (1933) - Henry Gibson's Valet (uncredited)
- Song of the Eagle (1933) - Beer Drinking Businessman (uncredited)
- Adorable (1933) - Valet (uncredited)
- I Love That Man (1933) - Casket Salesman (uncredited)
- Bureau of Missing Persons (1933) - Tom - Dock Watchman (uncredited)
- Ever in My Heart (1933) - Mailman (uncredited)
- College Coach (1933) - Regent (uncredited)
- The Meanest Gal in Town (1934) - Clark - Tillie's Clerk
- I've Got Your Number (1934) - Crystal's Partner in Con Game (uncredited)
- Journal of a Crime (1934) - Rigaud
- I'll Tell the World (1934) - Trapper (uncredited)
- Dr. Monica (1934) - Janitor (uncredited)
- The Notorious Sophie Lang (1934) - Jeweler (uncredited)
- The Party's Over (1934) - Hurley (uncredited)
- One Exciting Adventure (1934) - Grouchy Man
- A Lost Lady (1934) - Simpson
- I Sell Anything (1934) - Mr. Arden - Old Man (uncredited)
- Gentlemen Are Born (1934) - Pawnbroker (uncredited)
- Murder in the Clouds (1934) - Clement Williams
- Bordertown (1935) - Dean of Law School (uncredited)
- Sweet Music (1935) - Justice of the Peace (uncredited)
- Life Begins at 40 (1935) - Doctor (uncredited)
- Mary Jane's Pa (1935) - Chuck - the Old Timer (uncredited)
- The Girl from 10th Avenue (1935) - Art Clerk
- Oil for the Lamps of China (1935) - Dan
- Stranded (1935) - Tim Powers
- Dante's Inferno (1935) - Professor of Anatomy (uncredited)
- China Seas (1935) - Minor Role (scenes deleted)
- Here's to Romance (1935) - Stage Doorman (uncredited)
- Red Salute (1935) - Baldy
- The Goose and the Gander (1935) - Justice of the Peace (uncredited)
- Shipmates Forever (1935) - Tailor (uncredited)
- Frisco Kid (1935) - Tupper
- The Calling of Dan Matthews (1935) - Lawyer Partington
- If You Could Only Cook (1935) - Justice of the Peace (uncredited)
- Tough Guy (1936) - Elderly Witness (uncredited)
- Darkest Africa (1936) - Gorn
- The Country Doctor (1936) - Newspaper Editor (uncredited)
- I Married a Doctor (1936) - Pa Dawson (uncredited)
- F-Man (1936) - Mr. Whitney
- The Ex-Mrs. Bradford (1936) - Minister in Film (uncredited)
- Forgotten Faces (1936) - Druggist
- The Big Noise (1936) - Douglas, the Gardener (uncredited)
- Satan Met a Lady (1936) - City Fathers Committee Member (uncredited)
- Alibi for Murder (1936) - Walter Emerson (uncredited)
- The Case of the Black Cat (1936) - Keene's Apartment Manager (uncredited)
- The Man I Marry (1936) - Druggist
- Reunion (1936) - Editor
- Laughing at Trouble (1936) - Harvey
- Let's Get Married (1937) - Tom
- The Road Back (1937) - Ticket Taker (uncredited)
- The Case of the Stuttering Bishop (1937) - Bishop Mallory
- Slim (1937) - Doctor (uncredited)
- She Had to Eat (1937) - Stationmaster Tucker (uncredited)
- They Won't Forget (1937) - Confederate Soldier
- The Women Men Marry (1937) - Brother Lamb
- A Girl with Ideas (1937) - Judge (uncredited)
- Love and Hisses (1937) - Ticket Seller (uncredited)
- The Patient in Room 18 (1938) - Frank Warren
- White Banners (1938) - Sloan
- Jezebel (1938) - Second Director (uncredited)
- Three Comrades (1938) - Ludwig - Pat's Majordomo (uncredited)
- Four's a Crowd (1938) - Mike (uncredited)
- Garden of the Moon (1938) - Peter McGillicuddy
- Comet Over Broadway (1938) - Harvey
- Zenobia (1939) - Minister (uncredited)
- They Asked for It (1939) - 'Pi' Kelly
- Naughty but Nice (1939) - Professor Trill (uncredited)
- Indianapolis Speedway (1939) - Tom Dugan, the Counterman
- The Magnificent Fraud (1939) - Little Old Man (uncredited)
- Quick Millions (1939) - Storekeeper
- No Place to Go (1939) - Old Soldier (uncredited)
- Bad Little Angel (1939) - Ticket Seller at Station (uncredited)
- Our Neighbors – The Carters (1939) - Pop Hagen
- Joe and Ethel Turp Call on the President (1939) - Neighbor (uncredited)
- Teddy, the Rough Rider (1940, Short) - Russell Alger, Secretary of War (uncredited)
- Hot Steel (1940) - Carlton
- Brother Orchid (1940) - Aged Brother (uncredited)
- The Return of Frank James (1940) - Colonel Jackson
- Money and the Woman (1940) - Bank Customer Explaining 'NSF' (uncredited)
- Margie (1940) - Pinwinkle
- A Dispatch from Reuters (1940) - Chemist Who Poisoned Medicine (uncredited)
- Youth Will Be Served (1940) - Eli Hoy (uncredited)
- Chad Hanna (1940) - Elias
- Meet John Doe (1941) - Joe (uncredited)
- The Big Store (1941) - Mr. Andrews (uncredited)
- Blossoms in the Dust (1941) - Darrow (uncredited)
- Richest Man in Town (1941) - Old Timer (uncredited)
- You'll Never Get Rich (1941) - Doctor at Induction Center (uncredited)
- Nothing but the Truth (1941) - Elderly Clerk (uncredited)
- I Wake Up Screaming (1941) - Old Man at Library (uncredited)
- Bedtime Story (1941) - Elderly Man (uncredited)
- Mr. and Mrs. North (1942) - Lacey - Antique Dealer (uncredited)
- Woman of the Year (1942) - Adolph (uncredited)
- The Lady Is Willing (1942) - Boston Doorman (uncredited)
- Yankee Doodle Dandy (1942) - New York Stage Doorman (uncredited)
- Are Husbands Necessary? (1942) - Mr. Greenfield (uncredited)
- Lady in a Jam (1942) - Ground-Hog
- Daring Young Man (1942) - Old Man (uncredited)
- You Can't Escape Forever (1942) - Jimmy (uncredited)
- The Hard Way (1943) - Stage Doorman (uncredited)
- Crash Dive (1943) - Crony (uncredited)
- Lost Angel (1943) - Old Man in the Park (uncredited)
- Arsenic and Old Lace (1944) - Mr. Gibbs - the old man
