= Toby's Bow =

1919 film by Harry Beaumont

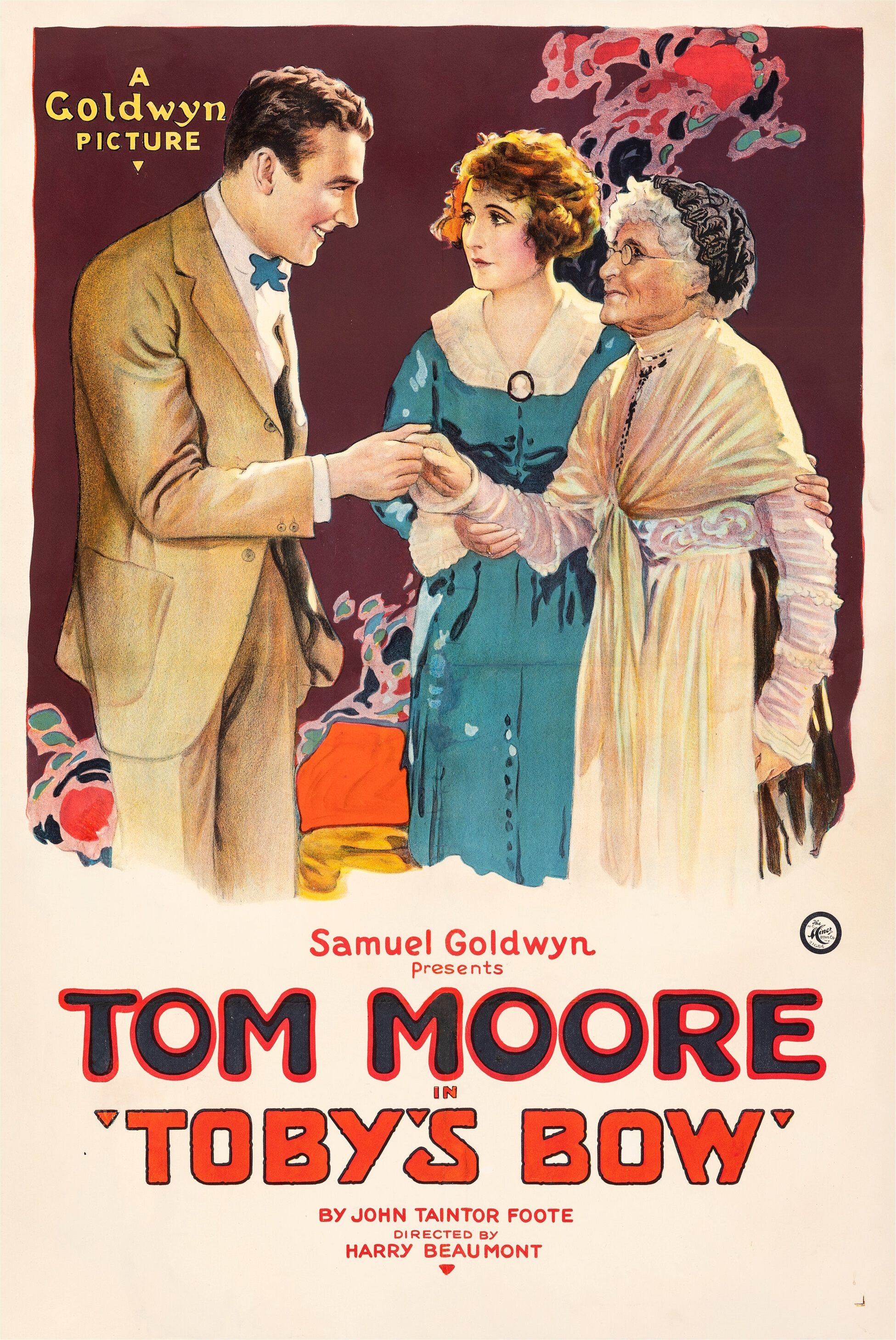
- Theatrical release poster
- Directed by: Harry Beaumont
- Written by: Edward T. Lowe Jr. (scenario)
- Based on: Toby's Bow by John Taintor Foote
- Starring: Tom Moore; Doris Pawn; Macey Harlam; Arthur Housman; Colin Kenny; Augustus Phillips
- Cinematography: Norbert Brodine
- Production company: Goldwyn Pictures
- Distributed by: Goldwyn Pictures
- Release date: December 14, 1919
- Running time: 50 minutes; 5 reels
- Country: United States
- Language: Silent (English intertitles)

Toby's Bow is a 1919 American silent drama film directed by Harry Beaumont and starring Tom Moore, Doris Pawn, Macey Harlam, Arthur Housman, Colin Kenny, and Augustus Phillips. It is based on the 1919 play of the same name by John Taintor Foote. The film was released by Goldwyn Pictures on December 14, 1919.

== Cast ==
- Tom Moore as Tom Blake
- Doris Pawn as Eugenia
- Macey Harlam as Dubois
- Arthur Housman as Bagby
- Colin Kenny as Bainbridge
- Augustus Phillips as Paige
- Catherine Wallace as Valerie
- Violet Schram as Mona
- Ruby Lafayette as Grandmother
- George Kuwa as Jap
- Nick Cogley as Uncle Toby

== Production ==
The role of the servant, Uncle Toby, was played by Nick Cogley in blackface. The use of blackface was not unusual in American silent films, and did not disappear in films until the 1930s when public sensibilities regarding race began to change and blackface became increasingly associated with racism and bigotry.

== Preservation ==
Toby's Bow is now considered to be a lost film.
