= Sidney Ainsworth =

English actor (1872–1922)

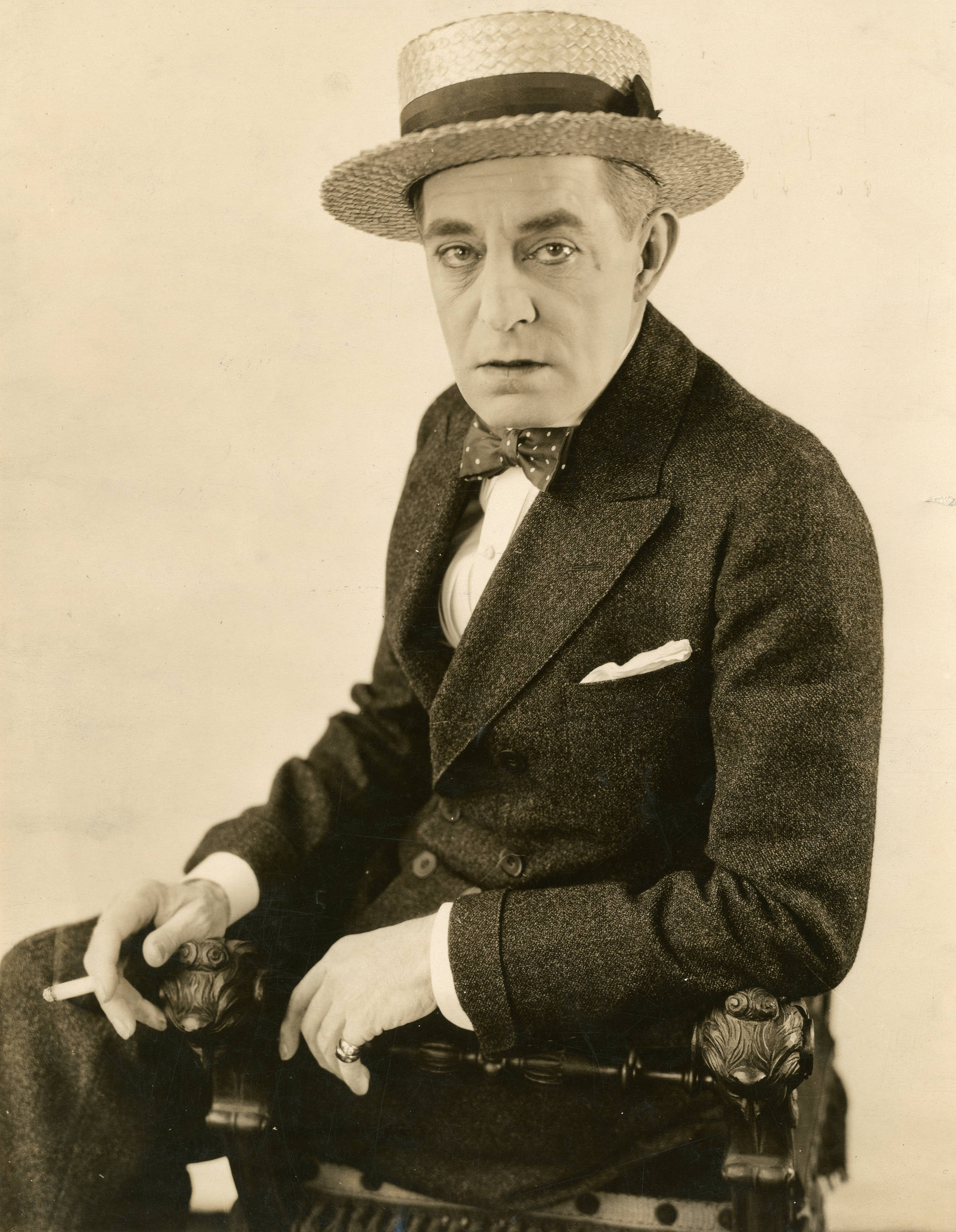
- Ainsworth c. 1920
- Born: Charles Sydney Ainsworth; December 21, 1872; Manchester, England
- Died: May 21, 1922 (aged 49); Madison, Wisconsin, United States
- Other name: Sydney Ainsworth
- Occupation: Actor

Charles Sydney Ainsworth (often credited as Sydney Ainsworth; December 21, 1872 – May 21, 1922) was a screen and stage actor who appeared in his first movie in 1909. He was born in Manchester, England and died in Madison, Wisconsin, United States.

== Filmography ==
- Mr. Wise, Investigator (1911)
- The Man Who Found Out (1914)
- The Romance of an American Duchess (1915)
- The Fable of the Bachelor and the Back-Pedal (1915) (as Sydney Ainsworth)
- The Conflict (1915)
- Lieutenant Governor (1915)
- Third Hand High (1915)
- Countess Veschi's Jewels (1915) (as Sydney Ainsworth)
- Above the Abyss (1915)
- The Greater Courage (1915) (as Sydney Ainsworth)
- The White Sister (1915) (as Sydney Ainsworth) .... Capt. Ugo Severi
- The Fable of the Scoffer Who Fell Hard (1915)
- The Counter Intrigue (1915)
- A Bag of Gold (1915) .... John Elliott
- Eyes That See Not (1915)
- Inheritance (1915)
- In the Palace of the King (1915) (as Sydney Ainsworth) .... Don Antonio Perez
- A Bit of Lace (1915)
- The Fable of Sister Mae, Who Did As Well As Could Be Expected (1915)
- The Strange Case of Mary Page (1916)
- The Misleading Lady (1916) .... Henry Tracey
- According to the Code (1916) (as Sydney Ainsworth) .... John Andrews
- The Woman Always Pays (1916)
- When Justice Won (1916)
- The Prince of Graustark (1916) .... Count Quinnox
- The Chaperon (1916) (as Sydney Ainsworth) .... Count Van Tuyle
- The Burning Band (1916) (as Sydney Ainsworth)
- Wife in Sunshine (1916) (as Sydney Ainsworth)
- The Extravagant Bride (1917)
- When the Man Speaks (1917) (as Sydney Ainsworth)
- The Wide, Wrong Way (1917)
- The Vanishing Woman (1917) (as Sydney Ainsworth)
- Ashes on the Hearthstone (1917) (as Sydney Ainsworth)
- The Wifeless Husband (1917) (as Sydney Ainsworth)
- The Trufflers (1917) .... Peter Ericson Mann
- On Trial (1917) .... Robert Strickland
- Two-Bit Seats (1917) (as Sydney Ainsworth) .... Merton Styles
- Brown of Harvard (1918) (as Sydney Ainsworth) .... Victor Colton
- A Man and His Money (1919) .... Walter Randall
- The Little Rowdy (1919) .... Roy Harper
- One Week of Life (1919) .... LeRoy Scott
- The Crimson Gardenia (1919) .... Francois
- Heartsease (1919) (as Sydney Ainsworth) .... Sir Geoffrey Pomfret
- The Girl From Outside (1919) .... Spencer
- The Loves of Letty (1919) .... Ivor Crosby
- The Gay Lord Quex (1919) .... Sir Chichester Frayne
- The Woman in Room 13 (1920) .... Andy Lewis
- Out of the Storm (1920) .... Al Levering
- A Double-Dyed Deceiver (1920) .... Thacker
- The Cup of Fury (1920) (as Sydney Ainsworth) .... Verrinder
- Madame X (1920) .... Laroque
- Half a Chance (1920) .... Jack Ronsdale
- The Branding Iron (1920) .... Jasper Morena
- Hold Your Horses (1921) .... Horace Slayton
- Boys Will Be Boys (1921) .... Sublette
- Doubling for Romeo (1921) .... Pendleton/Mercutio
- The Invisible Power (1921) .... Bob Drake
- A Poor Relation (1921) .... Sterrett
- Mr. Barnes of New York (1922) .... Danella
