= George Webber (cinematographer) =

American cinematographer (1876–1967)

- Born: May 10, 1876; Kingston, Ontario
- Died: August 29, 1967 (aged 91); New York, New York

George F. Webber (10 May 1876 – 29 August 1967), was a Canadian-born American cinematographer and actor. He cinematographed 171 films between 1914 and 1949.

He was born in Kingston, Ontario, Canada and died in New York, New York, United States.

== Partial filmography ==
- The Eternal Mother (1917)
- An American Widow (1917)
- The Image Maker (1917)
- The Candy Girl (1917)
- A Modern Monte Cristo (1917)
- Go West, Young Man (1918)
- A Man and His Money (1919)
- The City of Comrades (1919)
- One of the Finest (1919)
- Jinx (1919)
- The Gay Lord Quex (1919)
- Lord and Lady Algy (1919)
- Upstairs (1919)
- The Slim Princess (1920)
- Pinto (1920)
- Just Out of College (1920)
- The Blooming Angel (1920)
- The Concert (1921)
- Cinderella of the Hills (1921)
- Extra! Extra! (1922)
- Head Over Heels (1922)
- The Snow Bride (1923)
- The Exciters (1923)
- The Purple Highway (1923)
- The Little Red Schoolhouse (1923)
- Her Love Story (1924)
- Madame Sans-Gene (1925)
- Night Life of New York (1925)
- The Coast of Folly (1925)
- Stage Struck (1925)
- Fine Manners (1926)
- The Joy Girl (1927)
- East Side, West Side (1927)
- Syncopation (1929)
- Going Spanish (1934)
- Downward Slope (1934)
- Mixed Magic (1936)
- The Birth of a Baby (1940)
- Murder on Lenox Avenue (1941)
- Follies Girl (1943)
- Sepia Cinderella (1947)
