= Skinner's Dress Suit (1917 film) =

1917 silent film

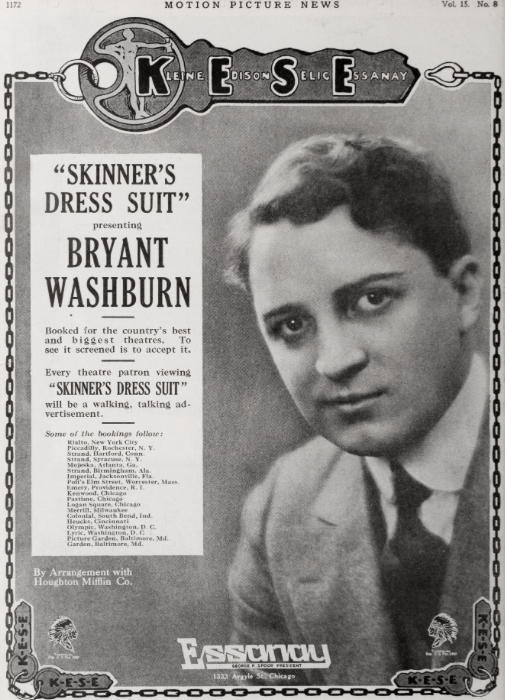
- Directed by: Harry Beaumont
- Written by: Charles J. McGuirk
- Based on: Skinner's Dress Suit by Henry Irving Dodge
- Starring: Bryant Washburn; Hazel Daly; Harry Dunkinson
- Cinematography: Jackson Rose
- Production company: Essanay Pictures
- Distributed by: K-E-S-E Service
- Release date: February 6, 1917
- Running time: 50 minutes
- Country: United States
- Languages: Silent; English intertitles

Skinner's Dress Suit is a lost 1917 American silent comedy film directed by Harry Beaumont and starring Bryant Washburn, Hazel Daly and Harry Dunkinson. It is based on the short story Skinner's Dress Suit by Henry Irving Dodge, which was again adapted into a silent film of the same title in 1926.

== Plot ==
William Skinner is afraid to ask his boss for a raise, but has promised his wife that he will get one. He gets cold feet at the last moment and fails to actually request the raise, and when he returns home, he lies and says that his pay has increased by 10 dollars a week, which he is secretly taking from his personal account. With his new "raise," she orders him to buy a new dress suit, which wipes out his whole account, and they enter a party attended by the wealthy. With his dress suit and apparent new high class status, he gets acquainted with the upper echelons of society and succeeds in a massive business deal for his firm. Skinner hurries off to the company's office to tell his boss the good news, and demands not only a raise but a partnership, and gains both.

== Cast ==
- Bryant Washburn as William Manning Skinner
- Hazel Daly as Honey
- Harry Dunkinson as Willard Jackson
- James C. Carroll as McLaughlin
- Ullrich Haupt as Perkins
- Florence Oberle as Mrs. J. Smith Crawford
- Frances Raymond as Mrs. Jackson
- Marian Skinner as Mrs. McLaughlin

== Production ==
A train chartered from Chicago to Milwaukee was used for the coach interiors.

== Preservation ==
With no holdings located in archives, Skinner's Dress Suit is considered a lost film.

== Bibliography ==
- Goble, Alan. The Complete Index to Literary Sources in Film. Walter de Gruyter, 1999.
