= Goldwyn Pictures =

Former American motion picture production company

Goldwyn Pictures Corporation
- Logo used from 1916 to 1924
- Industry: Film studio
- Founded: November 19, 1916; 109 years ago
- Founders: Samuel Goldwyn; Edgar Selwyn; Archibald Selwyn
- Defunct: April 17, 1924; 102 years ago
- Fate: Merged with the Metro Pictures Corporation and Louis B. Mayer Productions, Inc. to form Metro-Goldwyn-Mayer.
- Successors: Studio: Metro-Goldwyn-Mayer; Amazon MGM Studios; Library: Public domain
- Headquarters: Fort Lee, New Jersey, U.S.
- Products: Movies

Goldwyn Pictures Corporation was an American motion picture production company that operated from 1916 to 1924 when it was merged with two other production companies to form the major studio, Metro-Goldwyn-Mayer. It was founded on November 19, 1916, by Samuel Goldfish (who later changed his name to Goldwyn), an executive at Lasky's Feature Play Company, and Broadway producer brothers Edgar and Archibald Selwyn, using an amalgamation of both last names to name the company.

The studio proved moderately successful, but became most famous due to its iconic Leo the Lion trademark. Although Metro was the nominal survivor, the merged studio inherited Goldwyn's old facility in Culver City, California, where it would remain until 1986. The merged studio also retained Goldwyn's Leo the Lion logo.

Lee Shubert of The Shubert Organization was an investor in the company.

== History ==
Samuel Goldfish had left Lasky's Feature Play Company, of which he was a co-founder, in 1916 when Feature Play merged with Famous Players. Margaret Mayo, Edgar Selwyn's wife and play writer, and Arthur Hopkins, a Broadway producer, joined the trio as writer and director general.

At the beginning, Goldwyn Pictures rented production facilities from Solax Studios when it and many other early film studios in America's first motion picture industry were based in Fort Lee, New Jersey. The company's first release was Polly of the Circus, an adaptation of Mayo's 1907 play of the same name, released in September 1917 and starting Mae Marsh. By April 1917, Goldwyn Pictures agreed to rent the Universal Pictures studios in Fort Lee, then having the second largest stage, and had two film companies operating at the time with plans for more production companies. The company management planned on having 12 films done by September 1, 1917, without distributing the films so as to be able to show advanced footage to the theaters. Goldfish also associated the company with Columbia University via Professor Victor Freeburg's Photoplay Writing class in 1917 to increase the company's artistic standings. The company also released other production companies films with Marie Dressler's Dressler Producing Corporation film, The Scrub Lady, in 1917. The company was forced in October 1917 to switch out The Eternal Magalene for Fighting Odds, both starring Maxine Elliott, after the National Board of Review cleared the Magalene movie while censors in Pennsylvania state and Chicago city did not approve the film. Thais starring Mary Garden was released in late 1917 which was a costly loss.

In January 1918, Goldfish signed director Raoul Walsh and prematurely announced it as there were two years left on Walsh's contract with Fox. With Thais being the company's second costly loss, Goldfish decreased film budgets partly by not using theater divas to cross over to film and reducing design driven films. Instead, he relied on comedies starring Madge Kennedy and Mabel Normand. In August 1918, Goldwyn Pictures signed Will Rogers, at that time a Broadway Follies favorite, to star in a Rex Beach production, Laughing Bill Hyde, filmed at the Fort Lee studio for release in September. The company purchased the Triangle Studios in Culver City in 1918. Goldfish then headed west to Culver City, California in 1918; opening operations there also caused an increase in film expenses. Seeing an opportunity in December, Samuel Goldfish then had his name legally changed to Samuel Goldwyn.

In 1919, Frank Joseph "Joe" Godsol became an investor in Goldwyn Pictures. Since 1912, Godsol had been making deals for the Shubert Organization in the U.S. and abroad.

Goldwyn began looking to follow other film companies, like Loews Theaters/Metro Pictures and First National, into vertical integration. Goldwyn and the company backers were looking at renting the Astor Theatre for movie premiers. Instead, with the Capitol Theatre soon to be opened and the owners, headed by Messmore Kendall, looking for an operator to partner with, agreed to a stock swap and board seats, the Goldwyn Picture company and Moredall Realty Corporation. The Moredall Board, however, did not want the theater to rely only on Goldwyn films and operated The Capitol Theatre separately from the rest of the company.

By 1920, in addition owning its Culver City studio, Goldwyn Pictures was renting two New York studios and operations in Fort Lee.

After many personality clashes on the board, Samuel Goldwyn left the company in 1922. Godsol became president of Goldwyn Pictures in 1922. As things went from bad to worse at Goldwyn, in 1924 Frank Joseph Godsol initiated conversations with Marcus Loew about merging the company with Loew's Metro Pictures and after many long negotiations, all parties agreed to the merger. Louis B. Mayer heard about the pending merger and contacted Loew and Godsol, about adding his Louis B. Mayer Productions into the post-merger company, which became the blockbuster Metro-Goldwyn-Mayer.

== Feature staff ==
=== Actors ===
- Mae Marsh
- Mabel Normand
- Pauline Frederick
- Madge Kennedy
- Tallulah Bankhead
- Will Rogers
- E.K. Lincoln

=== Directors ===
- Raoul Walsh
- Ralph Ince
- Frank Lloyd
- Sidney Olcott

== Filmography ==
A 1965 fire in an MGM storage facility destroyed many negatives and prints, including the best-quality copies of every Goldwyn picture produced prior to 1924; over half of MGM's feature films from before 1930 are completely lost. On March 25, 1986, Ted Turner and his Turner Broadcasting System company purchased the pre-May 1986 MGM films (including Goldwyn Pictures films) from Kirk Kerkorian for $600 million.

=== Key ===
#	Considered to be lost.

Year	Title	Status
1917	Polly of the Circus	
1917	Baby Mine	
1917	Fighting Odds	
1917	The Spreading Dawn	Fragment
1917	Sunshine Alley	
1917	Nearly Married	Incomplete
1917	The Cinderella Man	
1917	Thais	
1918	Fields of Honor	
1918	Dodging a Million	
1918	Go West, Young Man	
1918	Our Little Wife	
1918	The Beloved Traitor	
1918	The Floor Below	
1918	The Splendid Sinner	
1918	The Face in the Dark	
1918	The Danger Game	
1918	Joan of Plattsburg	
1918	The Fair Pretender	
1918	All Woman	
1918	The Venus Model	
1918	The Service Star	
1918	The Glorious Adventure	
1918	Back to the Woods	
1918	The Border Legion	
1918	Friend Husband	
1918	Money Mad	
1918	The Turn of the Wheel	
1918	Peck's Bad Girl	
1918	Just for Tonight	
1918	The Kingdom of Youth	
1918	Hidden Fires	
1918	Thirty a Week	
1918	A Perfect 36	
1918	The Hell Cat	
1918	A Perfect Lady	Fragment
1918	The Racing Strain	
1919	Day Dreams	
1919	The Bondage of Barbara	
1919	Shadows	Fragment
1919	The Woman on the Index	
1919	Sis Hopkins	
1919	Daughter of Mine	
1919	Spotlight Sadie	
1919	A Man and His Money	
1919	The Pest	
1919	The Eternal Magdalene	
1919	The Stronger Vow	
1919	One Week of Life	
1919	Leave It to Susan	
1919	When Doctors Disagree	
1919	One of the Finest	
1919	The Fear Woman	
1919	The Crimson Gardenia	Incomplete
1919	The City of Comrades	
1919	Through the Wrong Door	
1919	Upstairs	
1919	The Peace of Roaring River	
1919	Heartsease	
1919	Lord and Lady Algy	
1919	The World and Its Woman	
1919	Strictly Confidential	Fragment
1919	Almost a Husband	
1919	Flame of the Desert	
1919	Bonds of Love	
1919	Jubilo	Inducted into the National Film Registry in 2021
1919	The Loves of Letty	
1919	Jinx	
1919	Toby's Bow	
1919	The Gay Lord Quex	
1920	Pinto	
1920	Water, Water, Everywhere	
1920	The Blooming Angel	
1920	The Paliser Case	
1920	Duds	
1920	The Little Shepherd of Kingdom Come	
1920	The Woman and the Puppet	
1920	The Strange Boarder	
1920	The Woman in Room 13	
1920	Jes' Call Me Jim	
1920	Dollars and Sense	
1920	A Double-Dyed Deceiver	
1920	The Great Accident	
1920	Cupid the Cowpuncher	
1920	The Penalty	
1920	The Slim Princess	
1920	Earthbound	
1920	The Truth	
1920	Stop Thief!	
1920	Milestones	
1920	Honest Hutch	
1920	Madame X	
1920	Officer 666	
1920	The Man Who Had Everything	
1920	Just Out of College	
1920	The Great Lover	
1920	Guile of Women	
1920	What Happened to Rosa	
1920	Help Yourself	
1921	Bunty Pulls the Strings	
1921	The Girl with the Jazz Heart	
1921	Hold Your Horses	
1921	The Highest Bidder	
1921	The Concert	
1921	Boys Will Be Boys	
1921	For Those We Love	
1921	A Tale of Two Worlds	
1921	Roads of Destiny	
1921	The Cabinet of Dr. Caligari	Originally released in 1920 in Germany
1921	An Unwilling Hero	
1921	Snowblind	
1921	Made in Heaven	
1921	A Voice in the Dark	
1921	The Old Nest	
1921	Don't Neglect Your Wife	
1921	Oh Mary Be Careful	
1921	The Ace of Hearts	
1921	All's Fair in Love	
1921	Beating the Game	Fragment
1921	Dangerous Curve Ahead	
1921	Doubling for Romeo	Incomplete
1921	The Invisible Power	
1921	The Grim Comedian	
1921	The Man from Lost River	
1921	Pardon My French	
1921	The Poverty of Riches	
1921	From the Ground Up	
1921	A Poor Relation	
1921	Voices of the City	
1922	Grand Larceny	
1922	Man with Two Mothers	
1922	Watch Your Step	
1922	Sherlock Holmes	
1922	Come on Over	
1922	When Romance Rides	
1922	Head over Heels	
1922	Yellow Men and Gold	
1922	His Back Against the Wall	
1922	Mr. Barnes of New York	
1922	The Wall Flower	
1922	The Strangers' Banquet	
1922	The Dust Flower	
1922	Remembrance	
1922	The Sin Flood	
1922	Brothers Under the Skin	Incomplete
1922	Hungry Hearts	
1922	A Blind Bargain	
1922	Broken Chains	
1922	The Glorious Fool	
1923	The Christian	
1923	Little Old New York	
1923	Gimme	
1923	Look Your Best	
1923	Unseeing Eyes	
1923	Under the Red Robe	
1923	The Love Piker	
1923	Lost and Found on a South Sea Island	Incomplete
1923	Vanity Fair	
1923	Souls for Sale	
1923	Three Wise Fools	
1923	The Spoilers	
1923	Red Lights	
1923	Six Days	
1923	Dr. Sunshine	
1923	The Eternal Three	
1923	The Steadfast Heart	
1923	Slave of Desire	
1923	The Last Moment	
1923	The Day of Faith	
1923	The Green Goddess	
1923	In the Palace of the King	
1923	The Rendezvous	
1923	Reno	
1923	The Ragged Edge	
1924	Wild Oranges	
1924	Name the Man	
1924	Through the Dark	Incomplete
1924	Second Youth	
1924	Three Weeks	
1924	Nellie, the Beautiful Cloak Model	
1924	True as Steel	
1924	The Rejected Woman	
1924	The Recoil	
1924	Tarnish	

== See also ==
- Samuel Goldwyn Productions, Samuel Goldwyn's next production company
- Samuel Goldwyn Studio, informal name for the Pickford-Fairbanks Studios lot in Hollywood.
- The Samuel Goldwyn Company, founded by Samuel Goldwyn Jr. in 1979, active through 1997
- Samuel Goldwyn Films, founded by Samuel Goldwyn Jr.
