= Hard Boiled (1926 film) =

1926 film

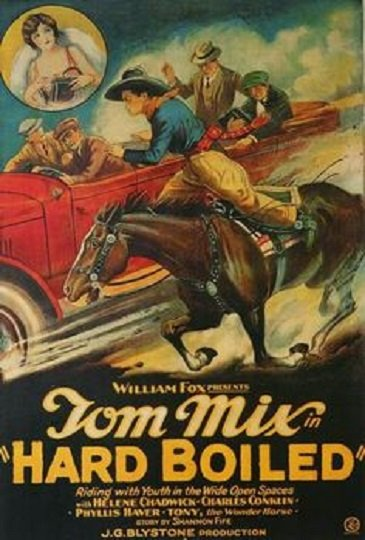
- Poster
- Directed by: John G. Blystone
- Written by: Shannon Fife; John Stone; Charles Darnton; Ralph Spence
- Produced by: William Fox; John G. Blystone
- Starring: Tom Mix; Helene Chadwick; Heinie Conklin
- Cinematography: Daniel B. Clark
- Edited by: Ralph Spence
- Production company: Fox Film
- Distributed by: Fox Film
- Release date: June 6, 1926
- Running time: 60 minutes
- Country: United States
- Language: Silent (English intertitles)

Hard Boiled is a 1926 American silent Western film directed by John G. Blystone and starring Tom Mix, Helene Chadwick, and Heinie Conklin.

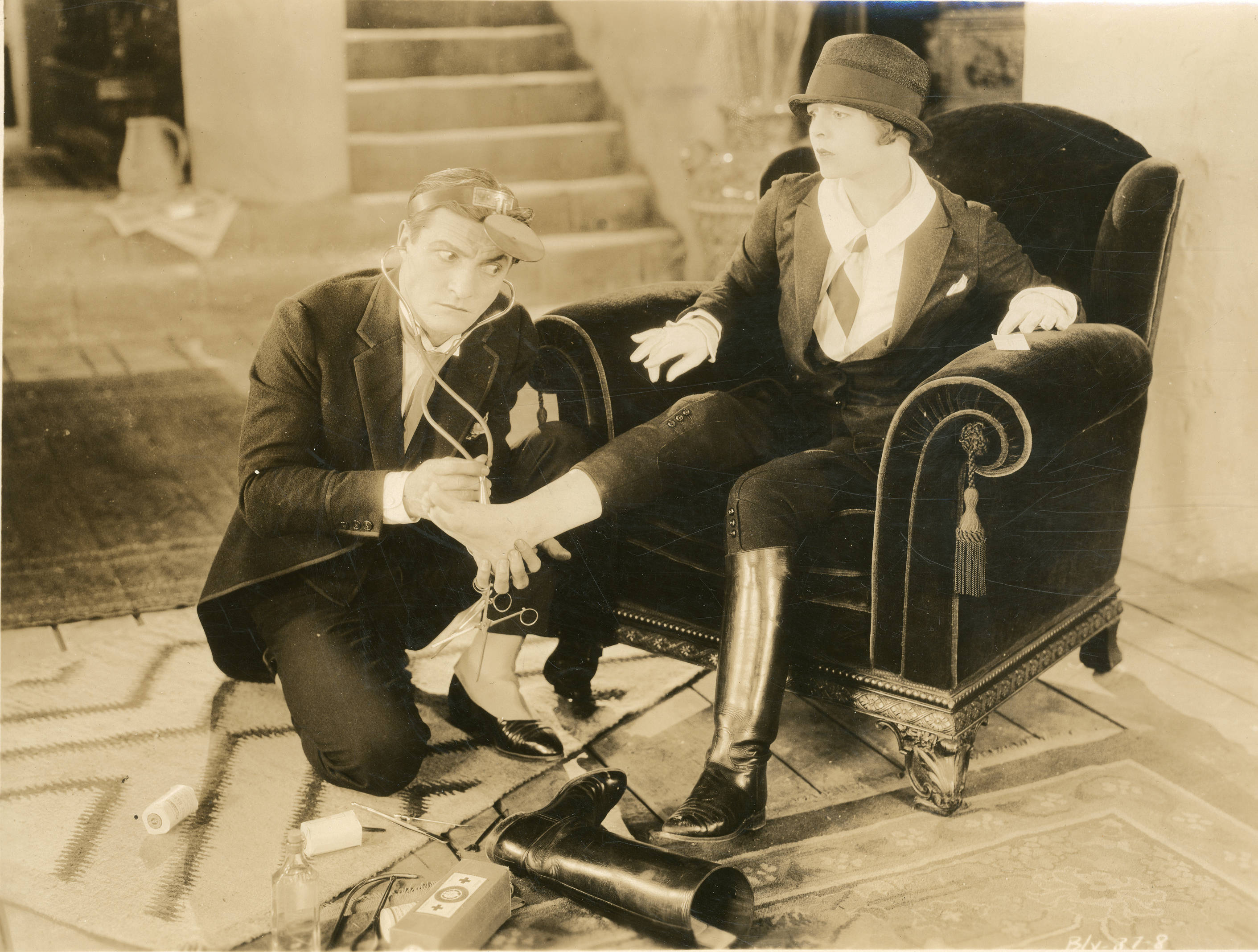
Still with Helene Chadwick

The film survives complete at the Czech Film Archive.

== Cast ==
- Tom Mix as Tom Bouden
- Helene Chadwick as Marjorie Gregg
- Heinie Conklin as Bill Grimes (as Charles Conklin)
- Phyllis Haver as Justine Morton
- W. E. Lawrence as Gordon Andrews
- Emily Fitzroy as Abigail Gregg
- Dan Mason as Abrue Boyden
- Spec O'Donnell as Eddie Blix (as Walter "Spec" O'Donnell)
- Ethel Grey Terry as Mrs. Sarah Morton
- Charley Chase (uncredited)
- Eddie Sturgis as First Crook
- Eddie Boland as Second Crook
- Emmett Wagner as Third Crook
- Tony the Wonder Horse as Tony, Tom's Horse

== See also ==
- List of American films of 1926

== Bibliography ==
- Solomon, Aubrey. The Fox Film Corporation, 1915-1935: A History and Filmography. McFarland, 2011.
