= Why Girls Leave Home =

Why Girls Leave Home may refer to:

- Why Girls Leave Home (1921 film), a lost American silent drama film produced by Harry Rapf for Warner Bros
- Why Girls Leave Home (1945 film), a film directed by William Berke, starring Lola Lane
