= Madame Jealousy =

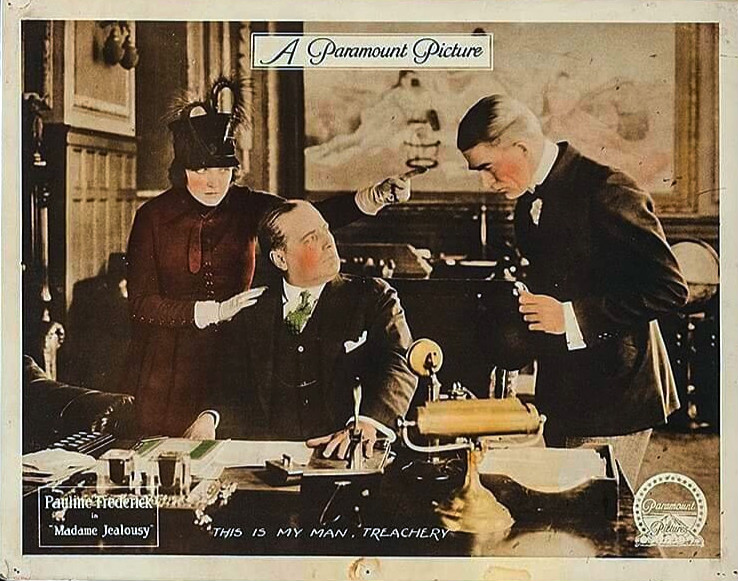
- Lobby card
- Directed by: Robert G. Vignola
- Screenplay by: George V. Hobart; Eve Unsell
- Produced by: Adolph Zukor
- Starring: Pauline Frederick; Thomas Meighan; Frank Losee; Charles Wellesley; Isabel O'Madigan; Elsie MacLeod
- Cinematography: Ned Van Buren
- Production company: Famous Players Film Company
- Distributed by: Paramount Pictures
- Release date: February 4, 1918
- Running time: 50 minutes
- Country: United States
- Language: Silent (English intertitles)

Madame Jealousy is a 1918 American silent allegorical drama film directed by Robert G. Vignola and written by George V. Hobart and Eve Unsell. The film stars Pauline Frederick, Thomas Meighan, Frank Losee, Charles Wellesley, Isabel O'Madigan, and Elsie MacLeod. The film was released on February 4, 1918, by Paramount Pictures. Its premiere was held at the Strand Theatre in New York City.

Location shooting for the film was done in St. Augustine, Florida.

== Plot ==
As described in a film magazine, always ready to wreck the happiness of human beings, Jealousy selects Charm and Valor as her two victims. She is almost successful at bringing about her desires, but the arrival of the child Happiness overcomes all disagreements. Jealousy awaits with interest her next victims.

== Cast ==
- Pauline Frederick as Madame Jealousy
- Thomas Meighan as Valour
- Frank Losee as Finance
- Charles Wellesley as Commerce
- Isabel O'Madigan as Pride
- Elsie MacLeod as Charm
- Ina Rorke as Display
- Francesca Cappelano as Mischief
- Grace Barton as Sorrow
- Eddie Sturgis as Treachery (credited as Edwin Sturgis)
- Marcia Harris as Rumor
- J.K. Murray as Good Nature

== Reception ==
L.J. Bourstein of Motography wrote: "Miss Frederick again is given opportunity to display her unusual dramatic capabilities and accomplishes another remarkable success [...] Excellent photography has considerable to do with this picture. Many of the numerous camera effects have been executed with precision and bespeaks of the capability of Ned Van Buren, the photographer. Robert Vignola directed and has turned out a very satisfactory and entertaining drama".

Like many American films of the time, Madame Jealousy was subject to cuts by city and state film censorship boards. The Chicago Board of Censors required a cut, in Reel 4, of an intoxicated young woman rising from a table and staggering towards a man.

== Preservation ==
Madame Jealousy is currently presumed lost. In February of 2021, the film was cited by the National Film Preservation Board on their Lost U.S. Silent Feature Films list.
