= Hobart Henley =

American actor (1887–1964)

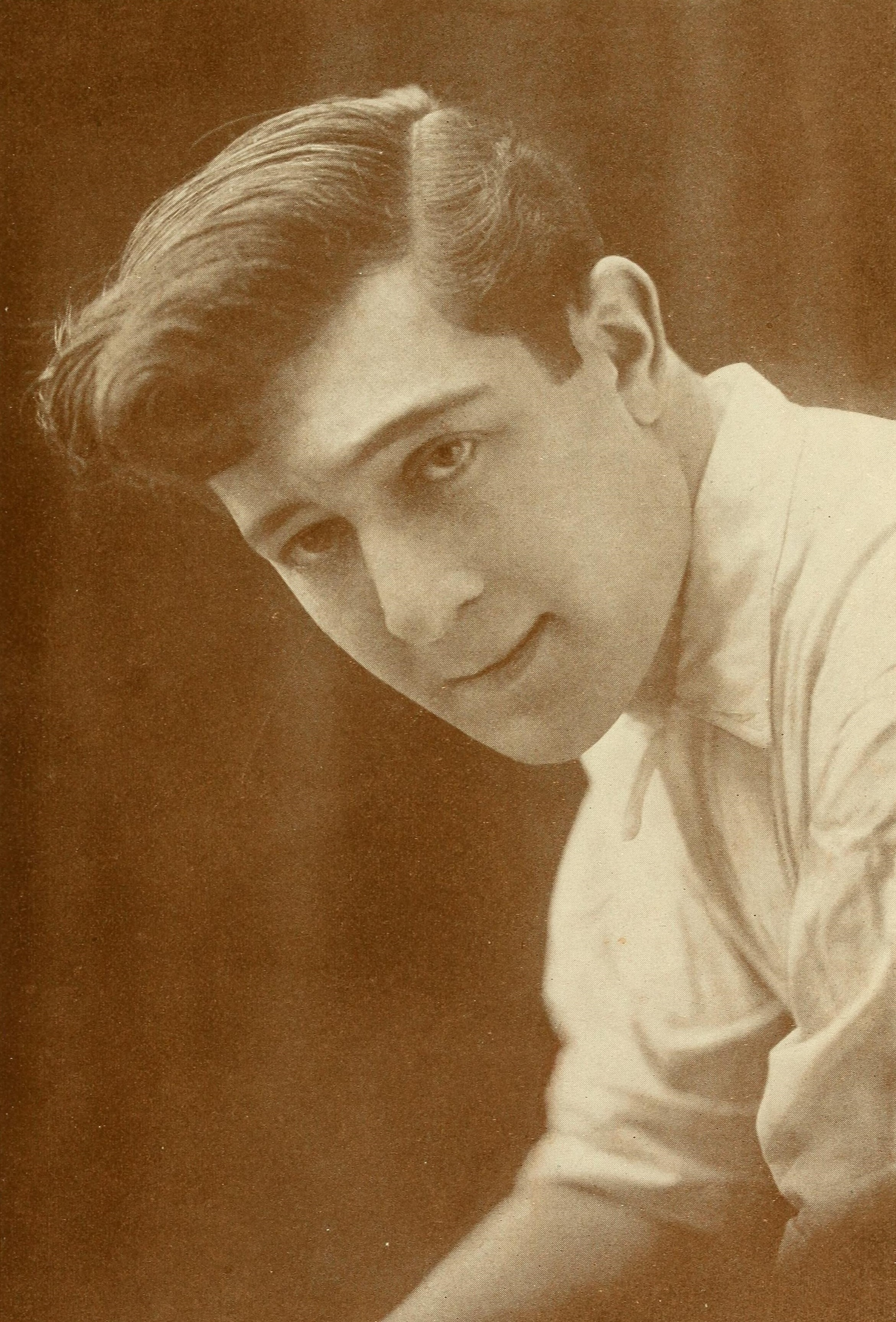
- Motion Picture Magazine, 1915
- Born: Hess Manassah Henle; November 23, 1887; Louisville, Kentucky
- Died: May 22, 1964 (aged 76); Beverly Hills, California
- Height: 6’2”
- Spouse: Dorothy Bertha March

Hobart Henley (born Hess Manassah Henle; November 23, 1887 – May 22, 1964) was an American silent film actor, director, screenwriter and producer. He was involved in over 60 films either as an actor or director or both from 1914 to 1934.

== Early life ==
Henley was born Hess Manassah Henle in Louisville, Kentucky, to Samuel Henle, a German immigrant and retailer, and his wife Clementine. His family moved to Cincinnati, Ohio, and Henley graduated from the University of Cincinnati.

== Career ==
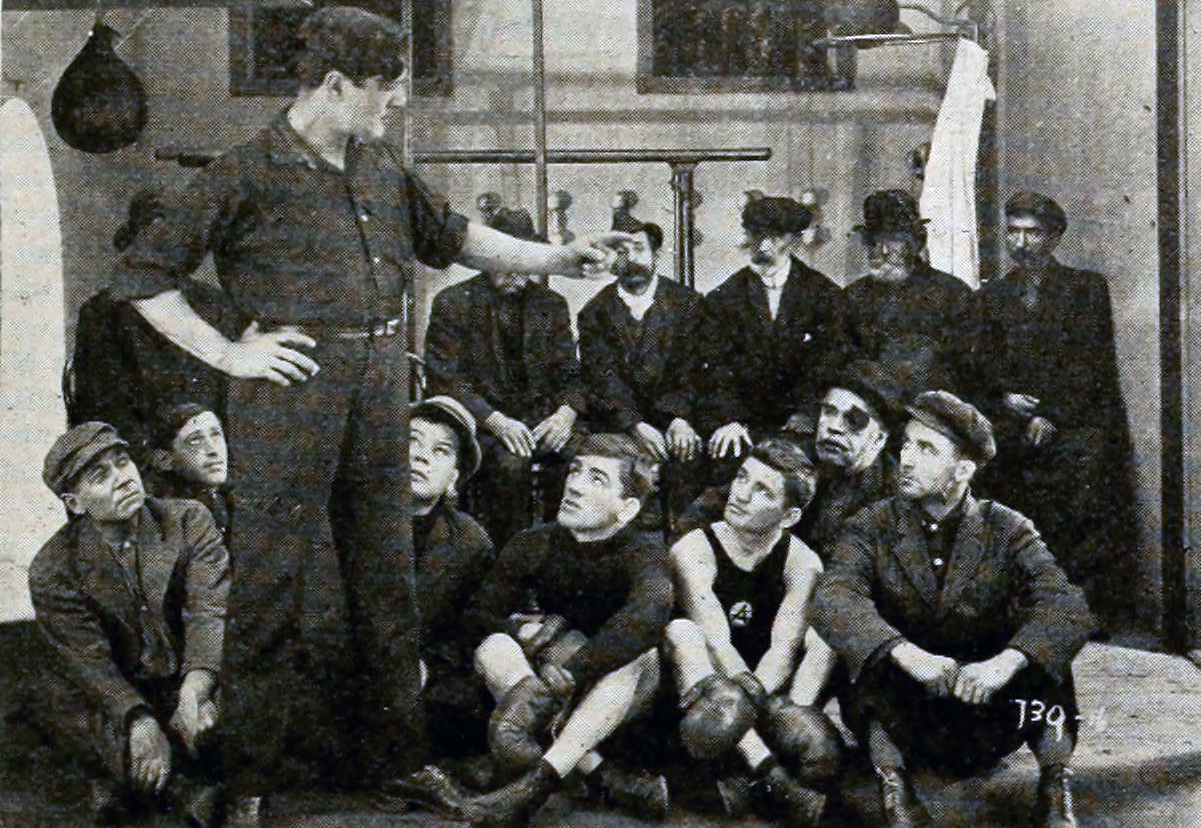
Henley on screen in Temptation and the Man (1916)

Henley began his career as a stage actor, then moved to acting in silent films. He began dual duties of directing and acting in such films as The Gay Old Dog for Pathé in 1919. He continued directing films, many of which were star's debuts like Bette Davis in the Bad Sister (1931) with Humphrey Bogart, as well as those of Reginald Denny, Jimmy Durante, and Will Rogers.

He started his own production company and later worked for Metro-Goldwyn-Mayer, Warner Brothers, Paramount Pictures and Universal Pictures. He directed top stars, including Claudette Colbert, Joan Crawford, Norma Shearer, and Maurice Chevalier. He retired in 1936.

== Personal life ==
He was married twice, first in 1920 to Corinne Barker, and later he married Louisiana native Dorothy March. He and March had two sons, David, and Hobart Jr. (deceased age 14). Henley died in Beverly Hills, California, aged 76, and he is interred at Chapel of the Pines Crematory, Los Angeles.

== Partial filmography ==
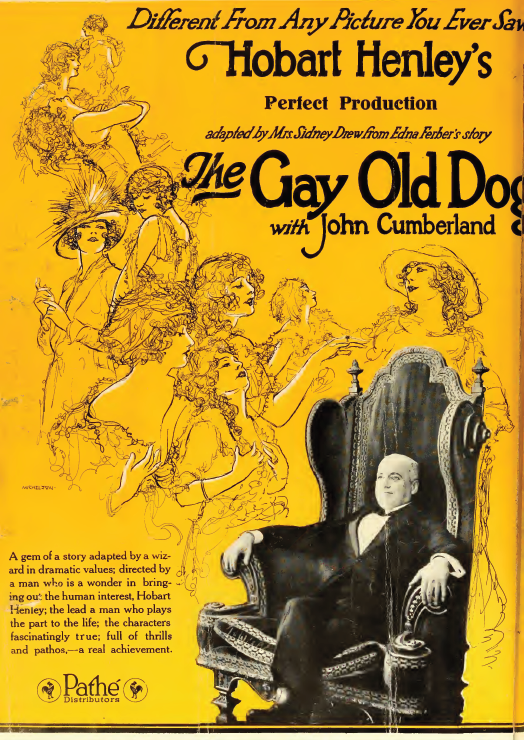
Advertisement for The Gay Old Dog (1919)

- Graft (1915)
- The Double Room Mystery (1917)
- All Woman (1918)
- Laughing Bill Hyde (1918)
- The Face in the Dark (1918)
- The Glorious Adventure (1918)
- The Woman on the Index (1919)
- One Week of Life (1919)
- The Gay Old Dog (1919)
- The Peace of Roaring River (1919)
- The Sin That Was His (1920)
- Society Snobs (1921)
- Cheated Hearts (1921)
- Her Night of Nights (1922)
- The Scrapper (1922)
- The Flame of Life (1923)
- The Flirt (1922)
- The Thrill Chaser (1923)
- The Abysmal Brute (1923)
- A Lady of Quality (1924)
- Sinners in Silk (1924)
- The Turmoil (1924)
- Married Flirts (1924)
- So This Is Marriage? (1924)
- The Denial (1925)
- A Slave of Fashion (1925)
- Exchange of Wives (1925)
- His Secretary (1925)
- The Auction Block (1926)
- Tillie the Toiler (1927)
- Wickedness Preferred (1928)
- A Certain Young Man (1928)
- His Tiger Lady (1928)
- The Lady Lies (1929)
- Roadhouse Nights (1930)
- The Big Pond (1930)
- Mothers Cry (1930)
- Free Love (1930)
- Captain Applejack (1931)
- Bad Sister (1931)
- Expensive Women (1931)
- Night World (1932)
- Unknown Blonde (1934)
