= Eddie Sturgis =

American actor

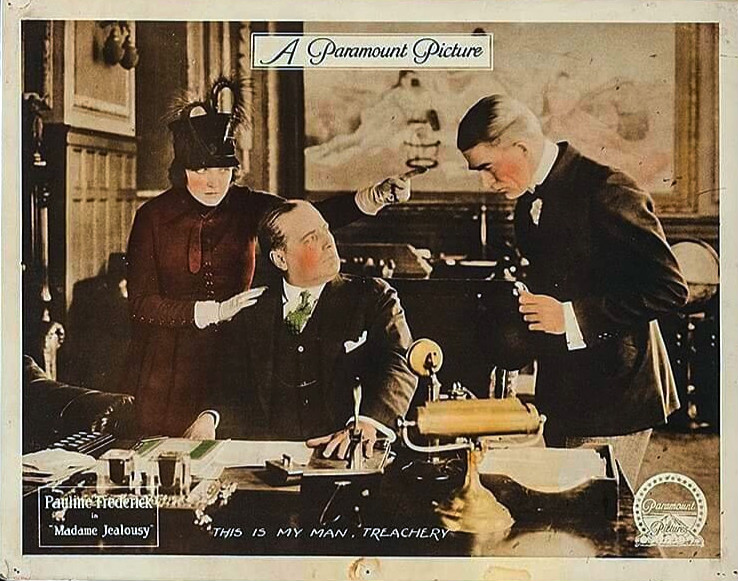
- Lobby card with Sturgis (right) in Madame Jealousy (1918)
- Born: Josef Edwin Sturgis; October 22, 1881; Washington, D.C., United States
- Died: December 13, 1947 (aged 66); Los Angeles, California, United States
- Occupation: Actor
- Years active: 1916–1938

Eddie Sturgis (1881–1947), also known as Edwin Sturgis, Ed Sturgis, or Edward Sturgis, was an American character actor of the silent and sound film eras.

== Biography ==
Born in Washington, D.C., his acting career began in the 1916 film The Lost Bridegroom, which starred John Barrymore. In his twenty-three year career, he appeared in over fifty films, mostly in supporting or smaller roles. His final performance would be in the 1939 Joe E. Brown vehicle, Beware, Spooks!, in a minor role. Sturgis died on December 13, 1947, in Los Angeles, California.

== Filmography ==
(Per AFI database)

- The Rainbow Princess (1916)
- The Lost Bridegroom (1916)
- The Moment Before (1916)
- Destiny's Toy (1916)
- A Case at Law (1917)
- A Girl Like That (1917)
- Heart's Desire (1917)
- Cassidy (1917)
- At First Sight (1917)
- We Should Worry (1918)
- Doing Their Bit (1918)
- Just for Tonight (1918)
- Madame Jealousy (1918)
- Peck's Bad Girl (1918)
- The Racing Strain (1918)
- The Bondage of Barbara (1919)
- Miss Crusoe (1919)
- One of the Finest (1919)
- The Peace of Roaring River (1919)
- A Man and His Money (1919)
- The Dark Star (1919)
- The Oakdale Affair (1919)
- The Deep Purple (1920)
- Man and Woman (1920)
- Legally Dead (1923)
- Ponjola (1923)
- Seven Keys to Baldpate (1925)
- The Blackbird (1926)
- Hard Boiled (1926)
- The Road to Mandalay (1926)
- The Show (1927)
- Let It Rain (1927)
- Wolf's Clothing (1927)
- After Midnight (1927)
- The Big City (1928)
- Fazil (1928)
- Shadows of the Night (1928)
- Square Crooks (1928)
- Outside the Law (1930)
- Shooting Straight (1930)
- The Squealer (1930)
- Sob Sister (1931)
- The Phantom of Crestwood (1932)
- Young America (1932)
- King Kong (1933)
- Broadway Bill (1934)
- Gentlemen Are Born (1934)
- Springtime for Henry (1934)
- Hell Bent for Love (1934)
- Here Comes the Groom (1934)
- Man on the Flying Trapeze (1935)
- Bad Boy (1935)
- Frisco Kid (1935)
- Red Hot Tires (1935)
- Mississippi (1935)
- Wanderer of the Wasteland (1935)
- Stolen Harmony (1935)
- The Jungle Princess (1936)
- Riffraff (1936)
- Hell-Ship Morgan (1936)
- Two-Fisted Gentleman (1936)
- Beware Spooks! (1939)
