= All Woman (film) =

1918 film by Hobart Henley

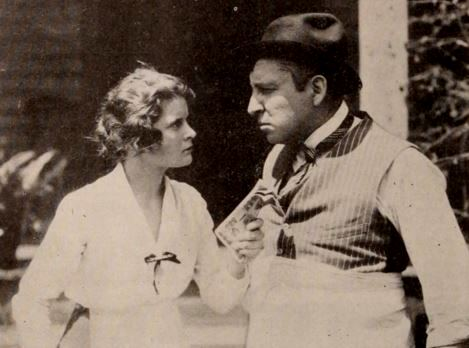
- Film still
- Directed by: Hobart Henley
- Written by: E. Lloyd Sheldon (scenario)
- Based on: When Carey Came to Town by Edith Barnard Delano
- Produced by: Samuel Goldwyn
- Cinematography: Oliver T. Marsh
- Production company: Goldwyn Pictures
- Distributed by: Goldwyn Pictures
- Release date: June 9, 1918
- Running time: 6 reels
- Country: United States
- Language: Silent (English intertitles)

All Woman is a 1918 American silent comedy film directed by Hobart Henley and starring Mae Marsh and Jere Austin. It is not known whether the film currently survives. Debut film of Warner Baxter.

== Plot ==
As described in a film magazine, Susan Sweeney, employed in a doll factory, learns that she has inherited a hotel in a small town in the Adirondacks. Picturing the hotel as resembling the most palatial building she has ever seen, she and two girl friends set out for the new home. Consternation reigns supreme when the young women are taken to a ramshackle building, one-half vacant and the other half decorated with persons in various stages of inebriation. The sight of two motherless children prompts Sue to remain and before long she has transferred the place into a fairly decent hotel. She is able to put the bar out of business, reforms the village drunkard, plays Cupid, and wins the love of Austin Strong.

== Cast ==
- Mae Marsh as Susan Sweeney
- Jere Austin as Austin Strong
- Arthur Housman as Dick Wellman
- John St. Polis as Sam Tupper
- John T. Dillon as William Kibby
- Joe Henaway as Hodges
- Hazel Alden as Miriam Strong
- Madelyn Clare as Millie
- Elsie Sothern as Agnes
- Lois Alexander as Amy
- Dan Mason as Cabdriver
- Jules Cowles as Alcoholic
- Alvina Alstadt as Motherless Child
- Warner Baxter (uncredited)
