= The Moment Before =

1916 film by Robert G. Vignola

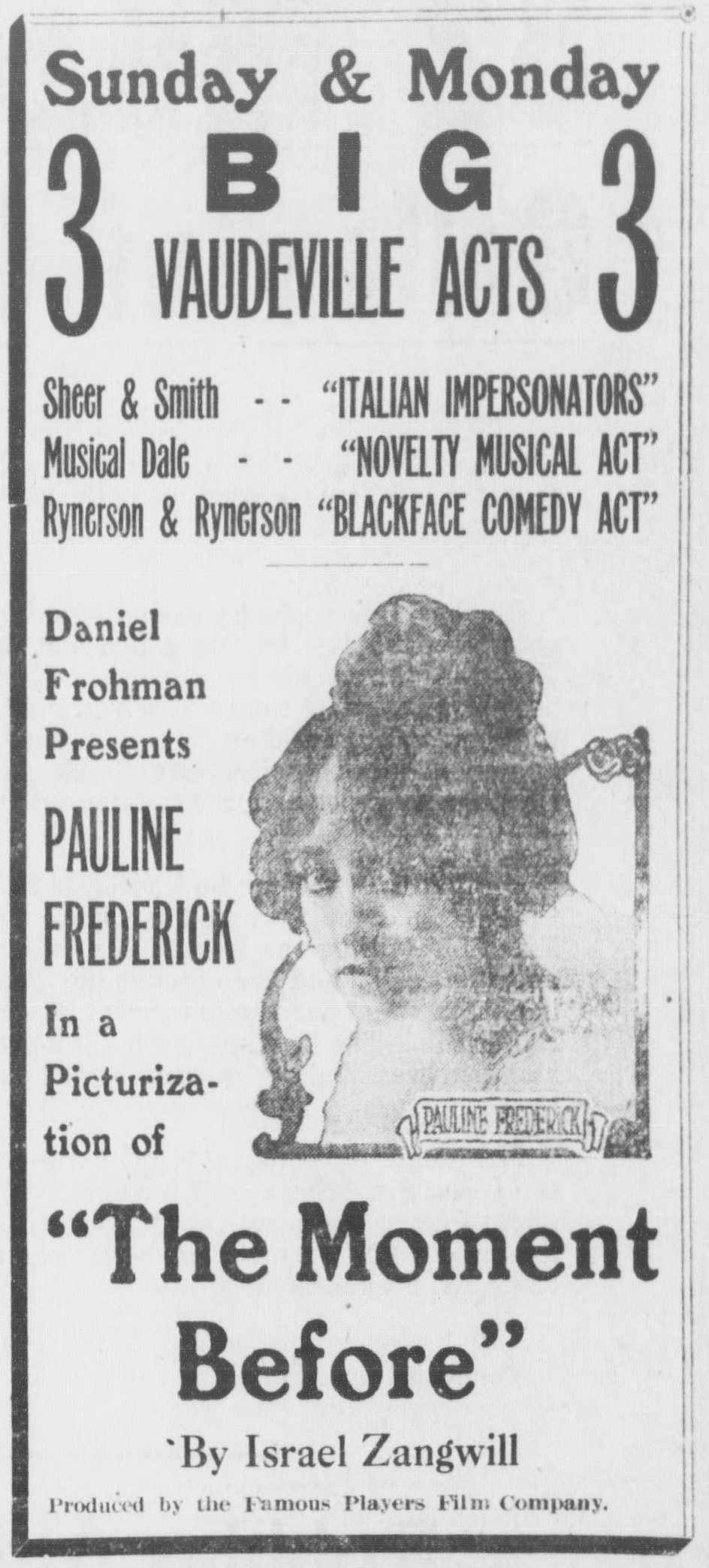
- Newspaper advertisement
- Directed by: Robert G. Vignola
- Written by: Hugh Ford (scenario)
- Based on: The Moment of Death by Israel Zangwill
- Cinematography: Edward Gheller
- Production company: Famous Players Film Company
- Distributed by: Paramount Pictures
- Release date: April 27, 1916
- Running time: 50 minutes
- Country: United States
- Language: Silent (English intertitles)

The Moment Before is a 1916 American silent drama film starring Pauline Frederick. Based on the play The Moment of Death by Israel Zangwill, it was produced by Famous Players Film Company and directed by Robert G. Vignola. The film opened at the Broadway Theatre in New York City on April 30, 1916.

== Cast ==
- Pauline Frederick as Madge
- Thomas Holding as Harold
- Frank Losee as Duke of Maldon
- J. W. Johnston as John, the Gypsy
- Edward Sturgis as Ojoe
- Henry Hallam as The Bishop

== Preservation ==
An incomplete, unpreserved 35mm nitrate print of The Moment Before is held by the Cineteca Nazionale in Rome. The print lacks the film's opening sequence, which establishes a flashback.

== See also ==
- List of rediscovered films
