= The Phantom of Crestwood =

1932 film

- Original theatrical poster
- Directed by: J. Walter Ruben
- Written by: Story: Bartlett Cormack; J. Walter Ruben; Screenplay: Bartlett Cormack
- Produced by: David O. Selznick
- Starring: Ricardo Cortez; Karen Morley; Richard "Skeets" Gallagher; Anita Louise; H.B. Warner; Pauline Frederick
- Cinematography: Henry W. Gerrard
- Edited by: Archie Marshek
- Music by: Max Steiner
- Distributed by: RKO Radio Pictures
- Release date: October 14, 1932
- Running time: 76 minutes
- Country: United States
- Language: English
- Budget: $187,000
- Box office: $436,000

The Phantom of Crestwood is a 1932 American pre-Code murder-mystery film released by Radio Pictures, directed by J. Walter Ruben, and starring Ricardo Cortez, Karen Morley, Richard "Skeets" Gallagher, Anita Louise, H.B. Warner, and Pauline Frederick. Morley plays Jenny Wren, who plans to extort money from various wealthy ex-lovers, after she lures them to a ranch called “Casa de Andes” near Crestwood, California. The picture features what Leonard Maltin called an "eye-popping" flashback technique, where the camera seems to whirl from one scene to the next, although William K. Howard had actually pioneered this technique earlier that year in The Trial of Vivienne Ware.

The film was based on a radio serial that was heard on NBC Radio's Hollywood on the Air for six weeks from August 26 through September 30, 1932. The radio program ended on a cliffhanger, with the solution to the murders to come in this film. A contest offered more than 100 prizes totaling $6,000 ($142,000 in 2025 dollars) for the best endings submitted to the network and Radio Pictures. The contest was closed before the film was released; the first winners were to be announced on the program on November 24, 1932. The picture was released on October 14, 1932. The film's introduction features NBC's Graham McNamee in a radio studio recapping the situation—he names Jenny Wren and Carter, as the doomed murder victims—and reminding the audience that the ending in the film was not drawn from contest submissions.

According to RKO records, the film made a profit of $100,000 ($2.36 million in 2025).

== Plot ==
Note on sources.

Beautiful courtesan Jenny Wren intends to “retire” to Europe, sailing first class and “alone, for once.” She gathers four rich and powerful former lovers—Priam Andes, William Jones, Eddie Mack and Herbert Walcott—along with Walcott's wife and Jones' fiancée, for an impromptu weekend party at Andes' ranch on the California coast. She blackmails Andes into hosting the event and informs him that his nephew and heir, Frank, is engaged to her young sister, Esther. Esther and Frank arrive at Jenny's apartment and decide to go to the ranch, too.

A man named Farnsbarns has been following Jenny.

At La Casa de Andes (1804) near Crestwood, the guests are playing darts. Jenny's surprise entrance stuns the three men. Andes introduces a Mr. Vayne. Andes' sister, Faith, arrives unexpectedly, obsessed with the family's old California bloodline and worried about her nephew's engagement.

The thunderstorms begin after dinner. Alone in the library with her victims, Jenny observes that they have all been “gamboling on the same green,” unaware. She demands money from each man according to his means—$50,000 from Jones, $100,000 from Andes, $25,000 from Mack and $250,000 from Walcott. Andes reveals that Vayne wants her as his mistress: “I'm through with that,” she replies. Her maid, Carter, interrupts to give Jenny a small box, delivered to the apartment. It contains a fraternity pin. Disturbed, Jenny tells the four another reason why she is through:

Flashback: Three weeks before, in the Adirondack Mountains, an unnamed young man, scion of a wealthy family, gives Jenny his fraternity pin, and tells her that he will get no money from his father if he marries before he is 25. She returns the pin and warns him to “stay away from hungry Mama bears.” He says “Goodbye” and steps off the cliff...

Walcott scoffs—the pin was delivered “from the grave, I suppose.” Jenny goes to her room and throws the pin out into the storm. She sees the boy's face gleaming in the trees outside.

At 3 a.m., Farnsbarns is prowling downstairs. Jenny screams and staggers from her room, a dart in her neck. He catches her; she murmurs “That face.” He puts her body on the sofa and leaves, but a landslide blocks the road. The house is roused. Faith phones the Crestwood police but is stopped by Farnsbarns, who introduces himself as Gary Curtis, a New York City private detective. He has teamed up with gangster Pete Harris (a childhood friend) and Pete's henchmen to retrieve a client's love letters to Jenny. Curtis starts his own investigation, knowing the police are coming; they will pin the crime on him unless he finds the killer first.

Curtis and Frank find Esther unconscious in Jenny's room. She remembers talking to Faith and going to Jenny. She was clubbed with a candlestick.

Curtis interviews suspects, including Vayne, who confesses—that his name is really Henry T. Herrick.

The lights go out; a white face appears and disappears. A distraught Vayne/Herrick cries out: It is the death mask of his son, Tom (the unnamed youth in Jenny's story). He wore it when he knocked out Esther and tried to kill Jenny. Herrick dies of a heart attack. “Wait, I remember now!” Esther calls. The lights go out; she is stabbed with a dart that misses her neck. At 5 a.m., she is asleep, locked in her room. Faith is looking after her.

Curtis is frustrated: If Esther had been killed, Faith would be the obvious suspect.

Carter has disappeared. Exploring outside, Curtis and Harris discover a tunnel door at the cliff. Inside, they find Carter's body and the death mask. Back in the house, Curtis stands where Jenny's murderer stood and mimes the dart throw, knocking the wall with his hand. In the wall, he finds a chip from a ruby ring. Curtis realizes that Faith Andes mistook Jenny for Esther. Using the tunnel, Faith has taken Esther out to the cliff edge. Forestalled, she calmly confesses before Esther, Frank, Curtis and Harris. As the police plane flies overhead, Curtis, face to face with Faith, pushes a stone over the edge with his toe. “Thank you,” she says, and follows it. Esther and Frank cling to each other as Curtis and Harris walk away.

== Cast ==
(cast list as per AFI database)

- Ricardo Cortez as Gary Curtis, also known as Farnes Barnes
- Karen Morley as Jenny Wren
- Anita Louise as Esther Wren
- Pauline Frederick as Faith Andes
- H.B. Warner as Priam Andes
- Mary Duncan as Dorothy Mears
- Sam Hardy as Pete Harris
- Tom Douglas as Allen Herrick
- Richard "Skeets" Gallagher as Eddie Mack
- Ivan Simpson as Henry T. Herrick, also known as Mr. Vayne
- Aileen Pringle as Mrs. Walcott
- George E. Stone as The Cat
- Robert McWade as Senator Herbert Walcott
- Hilda Vaughn as Carter
- Gavin Gordon as William Jones
- Matty Kemp as Frank Andes
- Clarence Wilson as Apartment house manager
- Eddie Sturgis as Bright Eyes
- Robert Elliott as Tall Man
