= Out of the Shadow (1919 film) =

1919 film by Emile Chautard

- Directed by: Emile Chautard; Al Lena (ass't director)
- Written by: Eve Unsell
- Based on: The Shadow of the Rope by E. W. Hornung
- Produced by: Adolph Zukor; Jesse Lasky
- Starring: Pauline Frederick
- Cinematography: Jacques Bizeul (fr)
- Distributed by: Paramount Pictures
- Release date: January 5, 1919
- Running time: 5 reels
- Country: United States
- Language: Silent (English intertitles)

Out of the Shadow is a 1919 American silent mystery film directed by Emil Chautard and starring Pauline Frederick.

== Plot ==
As described in a film magazine review, Ruth Minchin is unhappily married to her father's business partner Gabriel, who is a drunken brute. She starts a friendship with Severino, a pianist who lives in the same apartment building. Her husband discovers them together, orders Severino from the room, and strikes his wife down. Severino kills Gabriel while in a delirium following pneumonia, and Ruth is suspected of the crime. She is befriended by Richard Steel, who knew her husband from their time in Australia. However, Richard is also suspected of the crime, and she cannot marry the man who may have killed her husband. She later recalls the confrontation when she had been with Severino, and under pressure the pianist confesses to the crime, solving the mystery and leaving Ruth Richard on the road to happiness.

== Cast ==
- Pauline Frederick - Ruth Minchin
- Wyndham Standing - Richard Steel
- Ronald Byram - Edward Langholm
- William J. Gross - Reverend Woodgate
- Emma Campbell - Mrs. Woodgate
- Nancy Hathaway - Mrs. Vanables
- Agnes Wakefield - Richard Steel's, aunt
- Jack W. Johnston - Gabriel Minchin
- Syn De Conde - Severino
- William T. Hayes - ?

== Preservation ==
Out of the Shadow is currently presumed lost. In February of 2021, the film was cited by the National Film Preservation Board on their Lost U.S. Silent Feature Films list.
