= The Woman on the Index =

1919 film by Hobart Henley

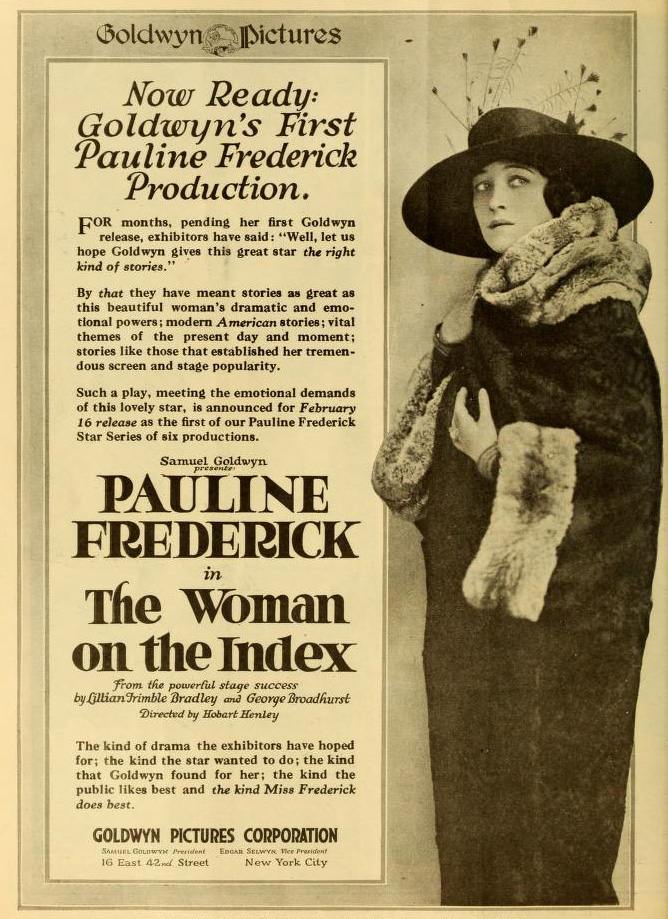
- lobby poster
- Directed by: Hobart Henley
- Written by: Willard Mack
- Based on: Lillian Trimble Bradley (play); George Broadhurst (play); Frank M. O'Brien (story)
- Produced by: Samuel Goldwyn
- Starring: Pauline Frederick
- Cinematography: Edward Gheller
- Distributed by: Goldwyn Pictures
- Release date: February 23, 1919
- Running time: 50 minutes
- Country: United States
- Language: Silent (English intertitles)

The Woman on the Index is a 1919 American silent drama film directed by Hobart Henley and starring Pauline Frederick and her then-husband playwright Willard Mack. It was Frederick's first film at Goldwyn Pictures after coming over from Paramount. The film was adapted by Mack based on a 1918 Broadway play of the same name by Lillian Trimble Bradley and George Broadhurst. The play had been based on a short story, again by the same name, by Frank M. O'Brien, which first appeared in Munsey's Magazine in 1913.

Openings for the film were held at the Rialto Theatre in New York City and at the Colonial Theatre in Green Bay, Wisconsin in March of 1919.

== Plot ==
As described in a film magazine, Sylvia Martin's past is that of despair. Turned out of an unhappy home, she becomes the wife of a handsome and manly type of crook. However, before the marriage can be consummated, he kills himself to avoid arrest. Sylvia is put on trial for murder and acquitted, but her name is recorded in a police index that falls into the hands of Hugo Declasse, an astute agent of the Bolsheviki. He pursues the wife, but she is also compelled to lend herself to the schemes of a secret service officer. She through her cleverness obtains documents held in the rooms of Declasse. In the end, she is returned to the arms of a forgiving and adoring husband.

== Cast ==
- Pauline Frederick as Sylvia Martin
- Wyndham Standing as David Maber
- Willard Mack as Hugo Declasse
- Ben Hendricks Sr. as John Alden (*as Ben Hendricks)
- Jere Austin as Louis Gordon
- Louis Stern as John Martin
- Francis Joyner as Butler (as Frank Joyner)
- Florence Ashbrooke as Mother Fralonz
- Florida Kingsley as Mrs. Martin

== Preservation ==
The Woman on the Index is currently presumed lost. In February of 2021, the film was cited by the National Film Preservation Board on their Lost U.S. Silent Feature Films list.
