= The Silent Barrier =

1920 silent film

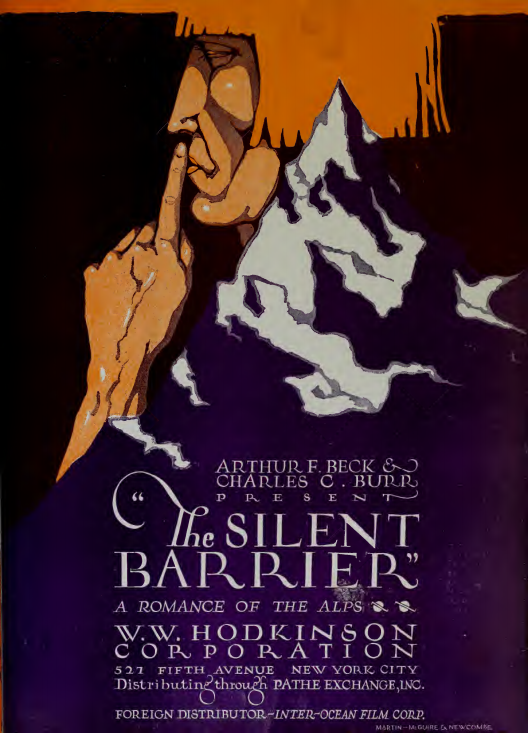
- Directed by: William Worthington
- Written by: Charles T. Dazey
- Based on: The Silent Barrier by Louis Tracy
- Produced by: Adolphe Menjou; C.C. Burr; Arthur F. Beck
- Starring: Sheldon Lewis; Corinne Barker; Gladys Hulette
- Cinematography: Bert Dawley; Virgil Miller
- Production company: Gibraltar Pictures
- Distributed by: Hodkinson Pictures; Pathe Exchange
- Release date: July 25, 1920
- Running time: 60 minutes
- Country: United States
- Languages: Silent; English intertitles

The Silent Barrier is a 1920 American silent drama film directed by William Worthington and starring Sheldon Lewis, Corinne Barker and Gladys Hulette. It is based on the 1909 novel of the same title by the British writer Louis Tracy. Much of the film takes place in the resort town St. Moritz.

== Cast ==
- Sheldon Lewis as Mark Bower
- Corinne Barker as Millicent Jacques
- Florence Dixon as Helen Wynton
- Donald Cameron as Charles K. Spencer
- Gladys Hulette as Etta Stampa
- Adolph Milar as Stampa
- Ernest Des Baillets as Barth
- Fuller Mellish as McKenzie
- Joseph Burke as Professor Lammenois
- Mathilde Brundage as Lady Lavasour
- John Raymond as Sir George Lavasour
- Robert Lee Keeling as Delavere

== Bibliography ==
- Munden, Kenneth White. The American Film Institute Catalog of Motion Pictures Produced in the United States, Part 1. University of California Press, 1997.
