= Peck's Bad Girl =

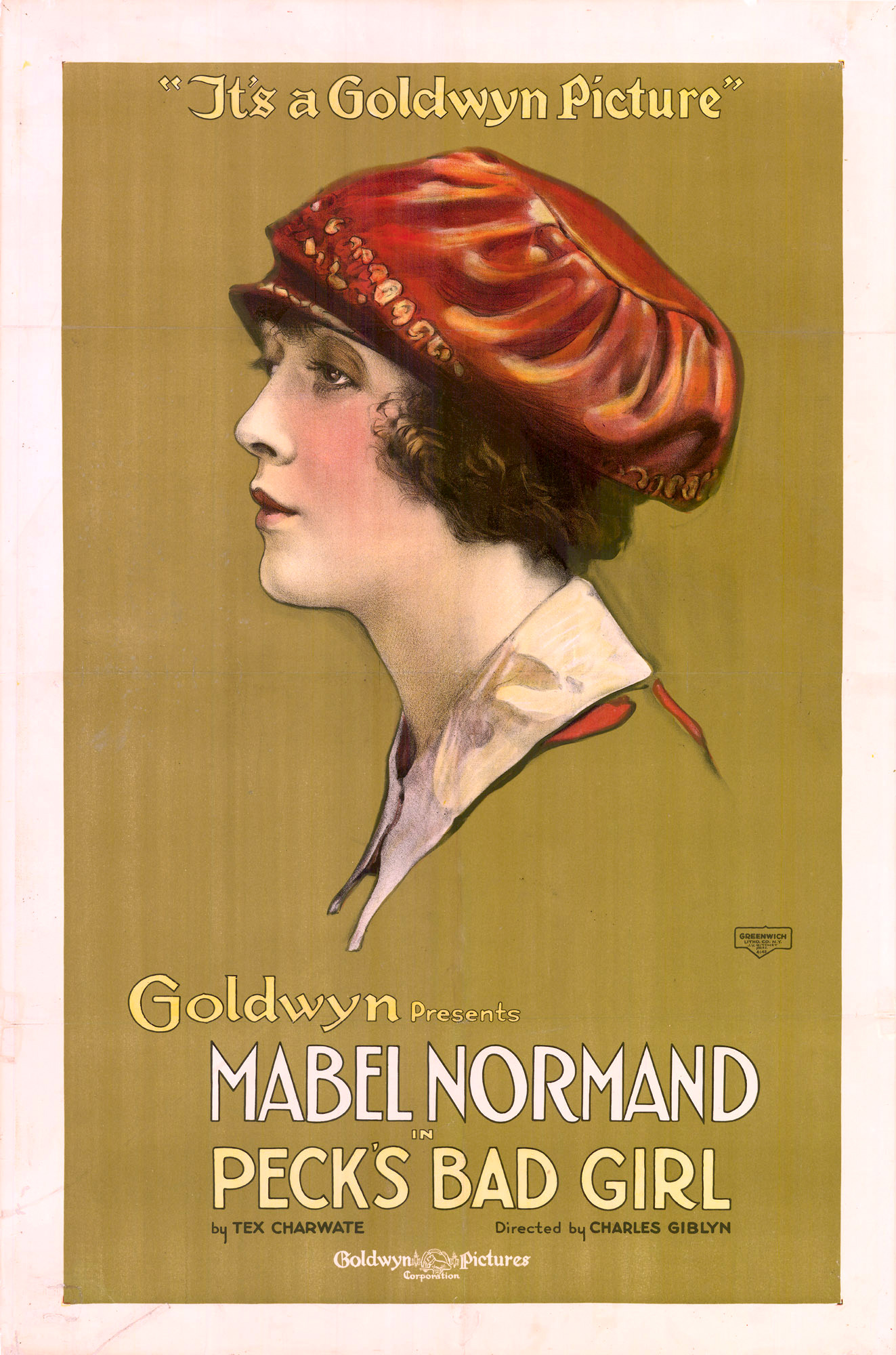
- Film poster
- Directed by: Charles Giblyn
- Written by: Tex Charwate
- Produced by: Samuel Goldwyn
- Starring: Mabel Normand; Earle Foxe
- Distributed by: Goldwyn Pictures Corporation
- Release date: September 2, 1918
- Running time: 50 minutes
- Country: United States
- Language: Silent (English intertitles)

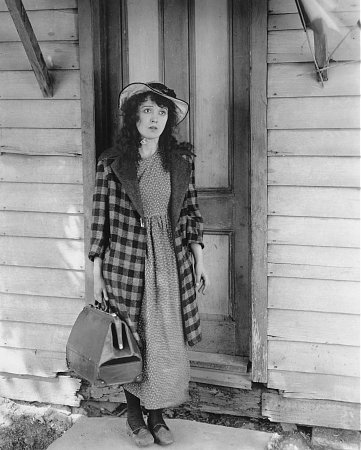
Mabel Normand in Peck's Bad Girl

Peck's Bad Girl is a 1918 comedy film directed by Charles Giblyn, written by Tex Charwate, produced by Samuel Goldwyn, and starring Mabel Normand and Earle Foxe. The black and white silent film, in the style of the Peck's Bad Boy stories, was released by the Goldwyn Pictures Corporation (a forerunner of Metro-Goldwyn-Mayer) in 35mm on September 2, 1918. The picture's running time is 50 minutes.

The status of this film is that it is now lost.

There was also a 1959 TV series titled Peck's Bad Girl with an unrelated story, starring Wendell Corey & Patty McCormack.

== Plot ==
As described in a film magazine, Peck's girl Minnie gets into so much mischief that the wiseacres of the town decide that she needs to be put to some useful occupation. A kindly lady takes her under her care and she soon becomes a more or less valuable assistant to a modiste's show. Returning to the store one evening to get a package, she comes across some sneak thieves who are burrowing beneath the bank. She spreads the alarm, captures one of the crooks, and wins the heart of a detective sent to apprehend the criminals.

== Cast ==
- Mabel Normand as Minnie Penelope Peck
- Earle Foxe as Dick
- Corinne Barker as Hortense Martinot
- Blanche Davenport as Miss Olivia
- Riley Hatch as Adam Raskell
- Leslie Hunt as Willie Raskell
- Eddie Sturgis as Pearson
- Joseph Granby as Walker
- Edward M. Favor as Peck (billed as E.M. Favor)
- F.G. Patton as Sheriff
- Auge Becker as Constable

== Production ==
The village set used for Peck's Bad Girl was built on the Goldywn backlot at Fort Lee.

== Reception ==
Variety's review was very positive, praising the excellent cast and describing the comedy as "funny, in a healthy, old-fashioned way."
