= Married Flirts =

1924 film by Robert G. Vignola

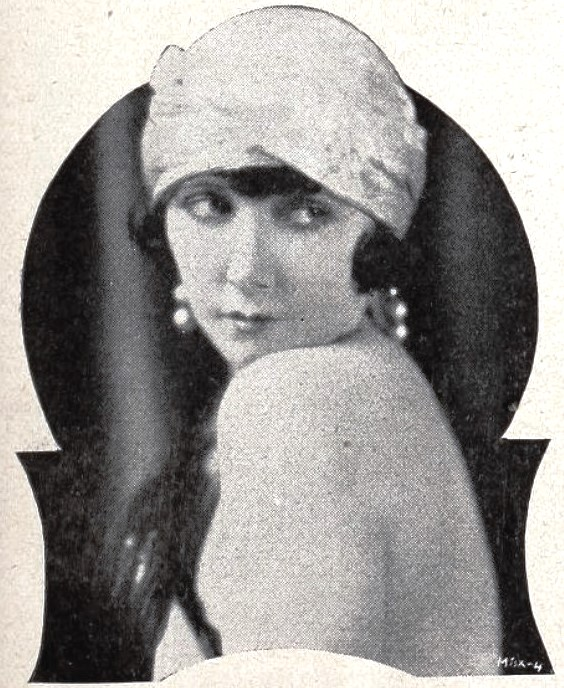
- Still with Mae Busch
- Directed by: Robert G. Vignola
- Written by: Julia Ivers
- Based on: Mrs. Paramor by Louis Joseph Vance
- Starring: Pauline Frederick; Mae Busch; Conrad Nagel
- Cinematography: Oliver T. Marsh
- Distributed by: Metro-Goldwyn-Mayer
- Release date: October 27, 1924
- Running time: 70 minutes
- Country: United States
- Language: Silent (English intertitles)

Married Flirts is a 1924 American silent drama film directed by Robert Vignola and starring Pauline Frederick, Mae Busch, and Conrad Nagel. The screenplay, written by Julia Ivers, is based on Louis Joseph Vance's 1923 best seller Mrs. Paramor. The drama was considered quite daring at the time as the story centered on husbands being lured away from their wives. One scene has well known Hollywood stars playing themselves at a party.

== Plot ==
Nellie Wayne is a novelist who loses her husband to a vamp, who thereupon rejects him to marry another man, who is seduced by the novelist.

== Cast ==
- Pauline Frederick as Nellie Wayne
- Conrad Nagel as Perley Rex
- Mae Busch as Jill Wetherell
- Huntley Gordon as Pendleton Wayne
- Paul Nicholson as Peter Granville
- Patterson Dial as Evelyn Draycup
- Alice Hollister as Mrs. Callender
- John Gilbert as himself, guest at party
- Hobart Henley as himself, guest at party
- Robert Z. Leonard as himself, guest at party
- May McAvoy as herself, guest at party
- Mae Murray as herself, guest at party
- Aileen Pringle as herself, guest at party
- Norma Shearer as herself, guest at party

== Preservation ==
With no prints of the film located in any film archives, Married Flirts is classified as a lost film. The last known copy of the film was destroyed in the 1965 MGM vault fire.

== See also ==
- List of lost films
