= Enchantment (1921 film) =

1921 film by Robert G. Vignola

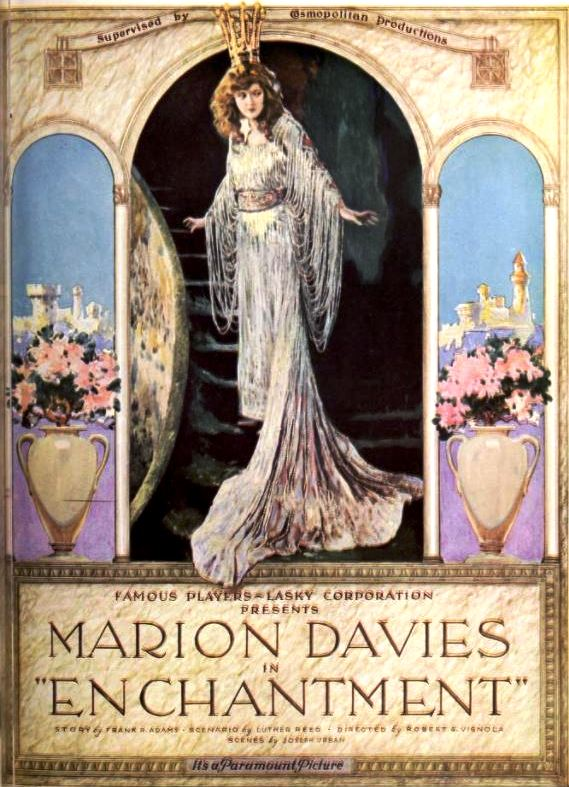
- Advertisement
- Directed by: Robert G. Vignola
- Written by: Luther Reed (scenario)
- Based on: "Manhandling Ethel" by Frank R. Adams
- Produced by: William Randolph Hearst
- Starring: Marion Davies; Forrest Stanley
- Cinematography: Ira H. Morgan
- Production company: Cosmopolitan Productions
- Distributed by: Paramount Pictures
- Release dates: October 30, 1921 (New York); November 20, 1921 (U.S.)
- Running time: 90 minutes
- Country: United States
- Language: Silent (English intertitles)

Enchantment is a 1921 American silent romantic comedy film produced by Cosmopolitan Productions and released by Paramount Pictures. The film was directed by Robert G. Vignola and starred Marion Davies. A print of the film exists in the Library of Congress.

== Plot ==
Inspired by a staging of William Shakespeare's Taming of the Shrew, Marion Davies plays Ethel, the spoiled-brat daughter of millionaire Mr. Hoyt. Mr. Hoyt decides that a rough-and-tumble he-man might be able to straighten out his daughter. To that end, the millionaire hires Ernest Eddison, the actor playing Petruchio in Shrew. Ernest talks Ethel into auditioning for an amateur production of Sleeping Beauty, then runs her roughshod during rehearsals. Ethel is on the verge of exploding when Ernest finally wins her over with a lulu of a third-act kiss.

== Cast ==
- Marion Davies as Ethel Hoyt
- Forrest Stanley as Ernest Eddison
- Edith Shayne as Mrs. Hoyt
- Tom Lewis as Mr. Hoyt
- Arthur Rankin as Tommy Corbin
- Corinne Barker as Nalia
- Maude Turner Gordon as Mrs. Leigh
- Edith Lyle as Fairy Tale Queen
- Huntley Gordon as Fairy Tale King
- Emmet Foy as Male flapper #2
- Julia Hurley as Fairy tale crone
- Gilbert Rooney as Male flapper #1

== Production ==
In her 11th film, Marion Davies stars as a willful flapper in a modern-day comedy/drama. Production was highlighted by a massive pageant set designed by Joseph Urban. This was the first of six Davies films directed by Robert G. Vignola and the first of four Davies films to co-star Forrest Stanley.

== Reception ==
The film was named as "Best Picture of the month" by Photoplay in February 1922.

== Status ==
A DVD was released by Edward Lorusso with a music score by Donald Sosin in February 2014. The film was broadcast on Turner Classic Movies in November 2014 and again in August 2017.
