= The Fear Woman =

1919 film

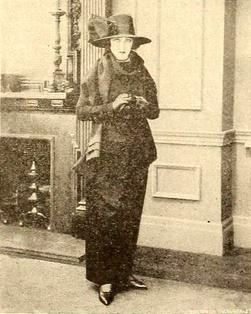
- Pauline Frederick
- Directed by: John A. Barry
- Written by: Izola Forrester (story)
- Produced by: Samuel Goldwyn
- Starring: Pauline Frederick; Milton Sills
- Cinematography: Edward Gheller
- Production company: Goldwyn Pictures
- Distributed by: Goldwyn Distributing Corp.
- Release date: June 8, 1919
- Running time: 50 minutes
- Country: United States
- Language: Silent (English intertitles)

The Fear Woman is a 1919 American silent drama film produced and distributed by Goldwyn Pictures and starring Pauline Frederick. The film was released in July of 1919 with openings held at the Rialto Theatre in New York City and at the Victory Theatre in Los Angeles.

Filming of a tennis tournament took place on location in Berkeley, California.

== Plot ==
As described in a film magazine, because her father warns her that alcoholism is a trait that has been inherited by the Winthrops over four generations, Helen Winthrop breaks her engagement to Robert Craig for fear of bringing children into the world that are predisposed to drunkenness. They separate and Helen visits Stella Scarr, an old friend. When Stella foolishly deceives her husband Sidney, Helen shields her and is disgraced. Percy Farwell, newly rich, becomes enamored of her, and his mother hires Robert to break up their supposed affair. Helen feigns drunkenness at the betrothal dinner and is able to prove Robert's love for her. They then resume their engagement.

== Cast ==
- Pauline Frederick as Helen Winthrop
- Milton Sills as Robert Craig
- Walter Hiers as Percy Farwell
- Emmett King as Harrison Winthrop
- Harry Northrup as Sidney Scarr (credited as Harry S. Northrup)
- Ernest Pasque as Bruce Terhune
- Beverly Travers as Stella Scarr
- Lydia Yeamans Titus as Mrs. Honorah Farwell

== Reception ==
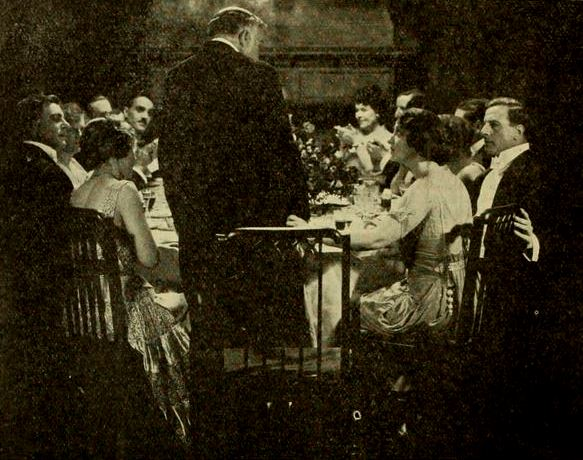
Still from the film featuring Pauline Frederick and Milton Sills, printed in Moving Picture World, May 10, 1919

Variety's review was mostly positive, though the reviewer criticized the premise of the story due to the recent ratification of the 18th Amendment, saying; "But with the country gone dry why need the girl fear a heritage of that nature?"

Motion Picture News' review was also positive, despite finding the "time-worn pattern of a woman who very nearly sacrifices her good name to permit a friend to emerge from a certain entangling alliance" to be unoriginal.

Moving Picture World reviewer Louis Reeves Harrison was mixed in their review, finding that the story became "sidetracked" when it introduced comedic aspects and when Helen becomes involved with Stella. Harrison was complimentary to Pauline Frederick's performance.

Linda A. Griffith (Mrs. D.W. Griffith) writing in Film Fun magazine was deeply critical of The Fear Woman. When Helen feigned drunkenness, Griffith said "As she apparently has never been much worried about any such weakness in herself, but only in her power to transmit the curse to the innocent unborn, the Fear Woman’s logic is beyond the normal mind to fathom."

== Preservation ==
The Fear Woman is currently presumed lost. In February of 2021, the film was cited by the National Film Preservation Board on their Lost U.S. Silent Feature Films list.
