= The Peace of Roaring River =

1919 American film

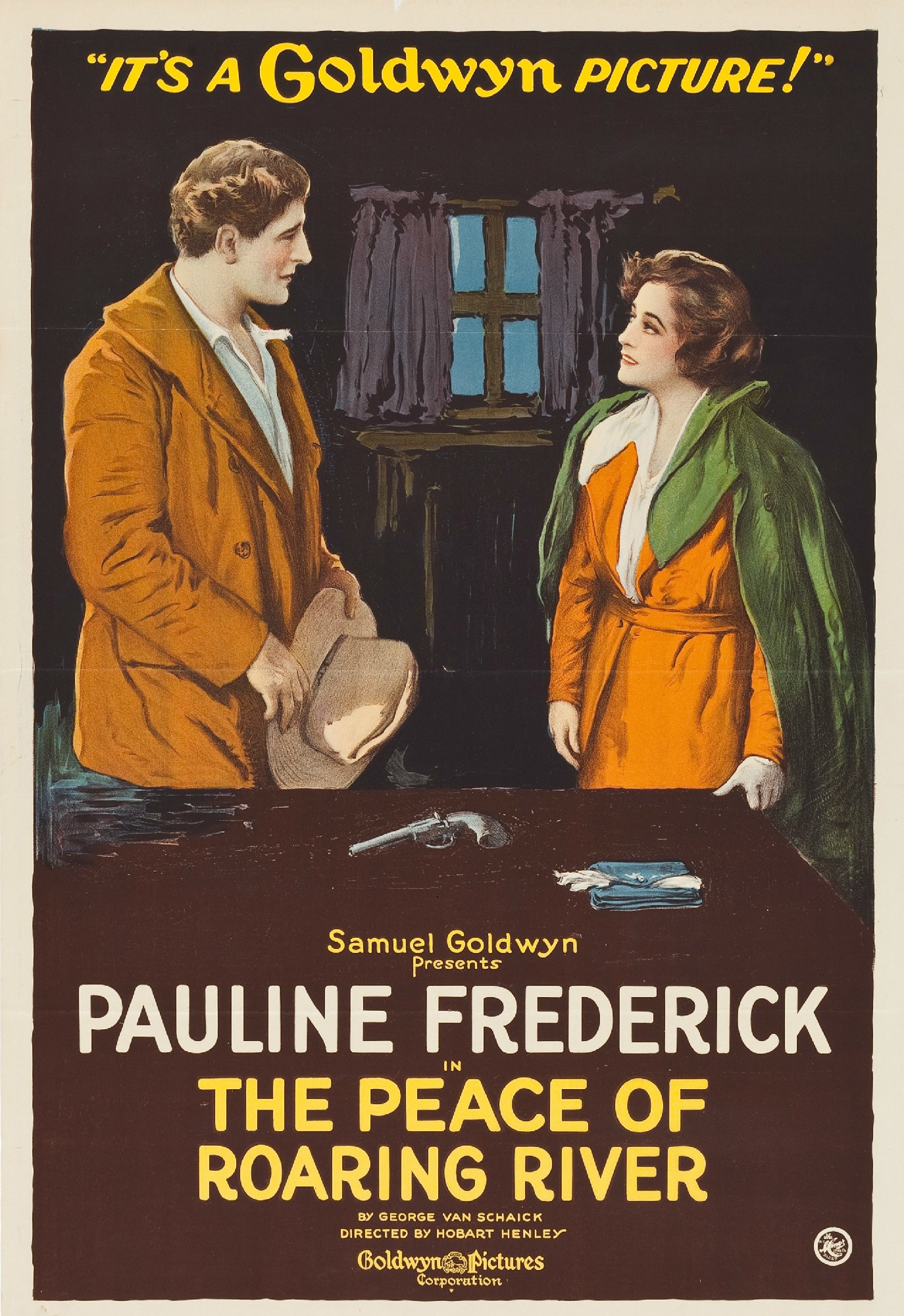
- Lobby poster
- Directed by: Hobart Henley; Victor Schertzinger
- Written by: George E. Van Schaik (story, scenario)
- Produced by: Samuel Goldwyn
- Starring: Pauline Frederick
- Cinematography: Edward Gheller
- Distributed by: Goldwyn Pictures
- Release date: August 10, 1919
- Running time: 50 minutes; 5 reels
- Country: United States
- Languages: Silent; English intertitles

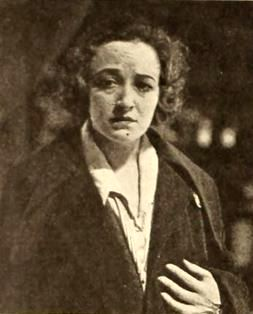
Pauline Frederick

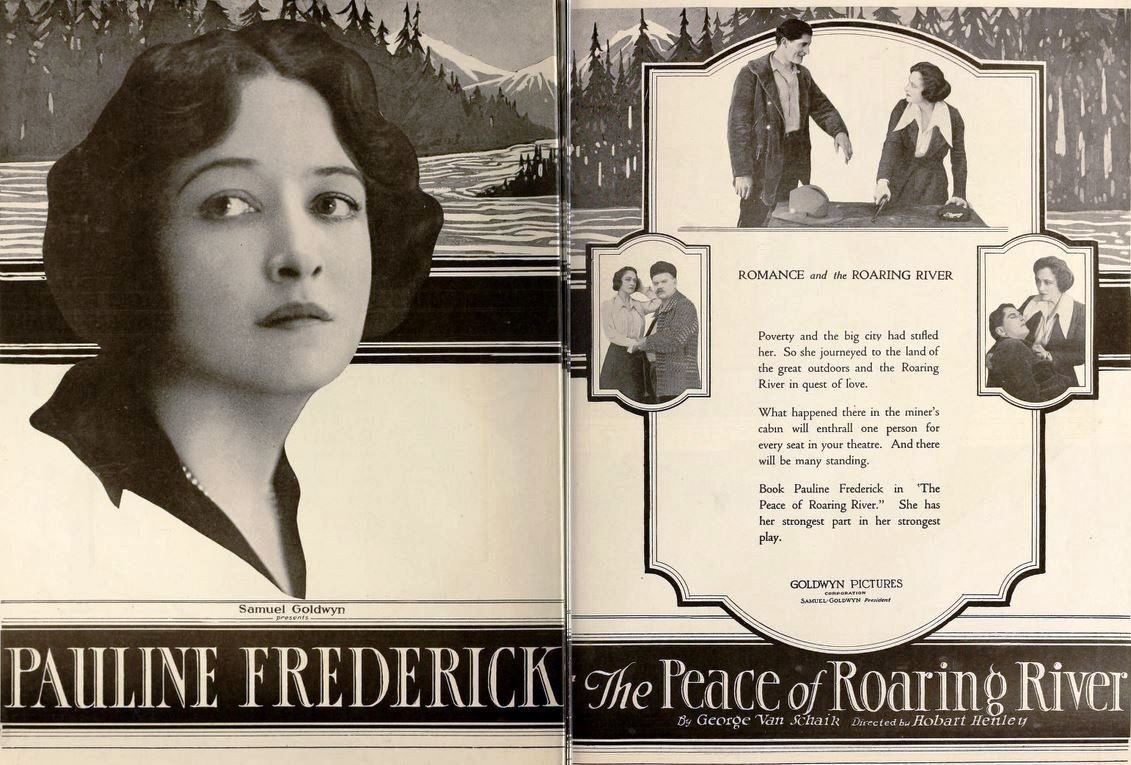
advertisement

The Peace of Roaring River is a 1919 American silent Western film produced and distributed by Goldwyn Pictures and starring Pauline Frederick. Hobart Henley and Victor Schertzinger directed the production.

== Plot ==
As described in a film magazine, Hugo Ennis, a man's man, refuses to capitulate to the wooing of Sophy McGurn, the postmistress, which arouses her resentment. She puts an advertisement in a matrimonial newspaper and answers the replies in his name. This causes little Madge Nelson of Omaha, Nebraska, to come to the little town. Her recent illness has left her penniless and friendless. She goes to Ennis' cabin. Ennis returns, thinks he smells a blackmailing scheme, and during the argument that follows is shot by Madge. Madge summons a doctor and saves the life of Ennis. Sophy leads a delegation of the town's women to drive Madge out of the community. Ennis recovers consciousness and, discovering that he loves Madge, persuades her to stay. He outwits the designing Sophy and marries Madge.

== Cast ==
- Pauline Frederick as Madge Nelson
- Hardee Kirkland as Nils Olsen
- Corinne Barker as Sophy McGurn
- Lydia Yeamans Titus as Landlady
- Eddie Sturgis as Kid Follansbee
- Thomas Holding as Hugo Ennis

== Preservation ==
The Peace of Roaring River is currently presumed lost. In February of 2021, the film was cited by the National Film Preservation Board on their Lost U.S. Silent Feature Films list.
