= Jack Spurlock, Prodigal =

1918 film by Carl Harbaugh

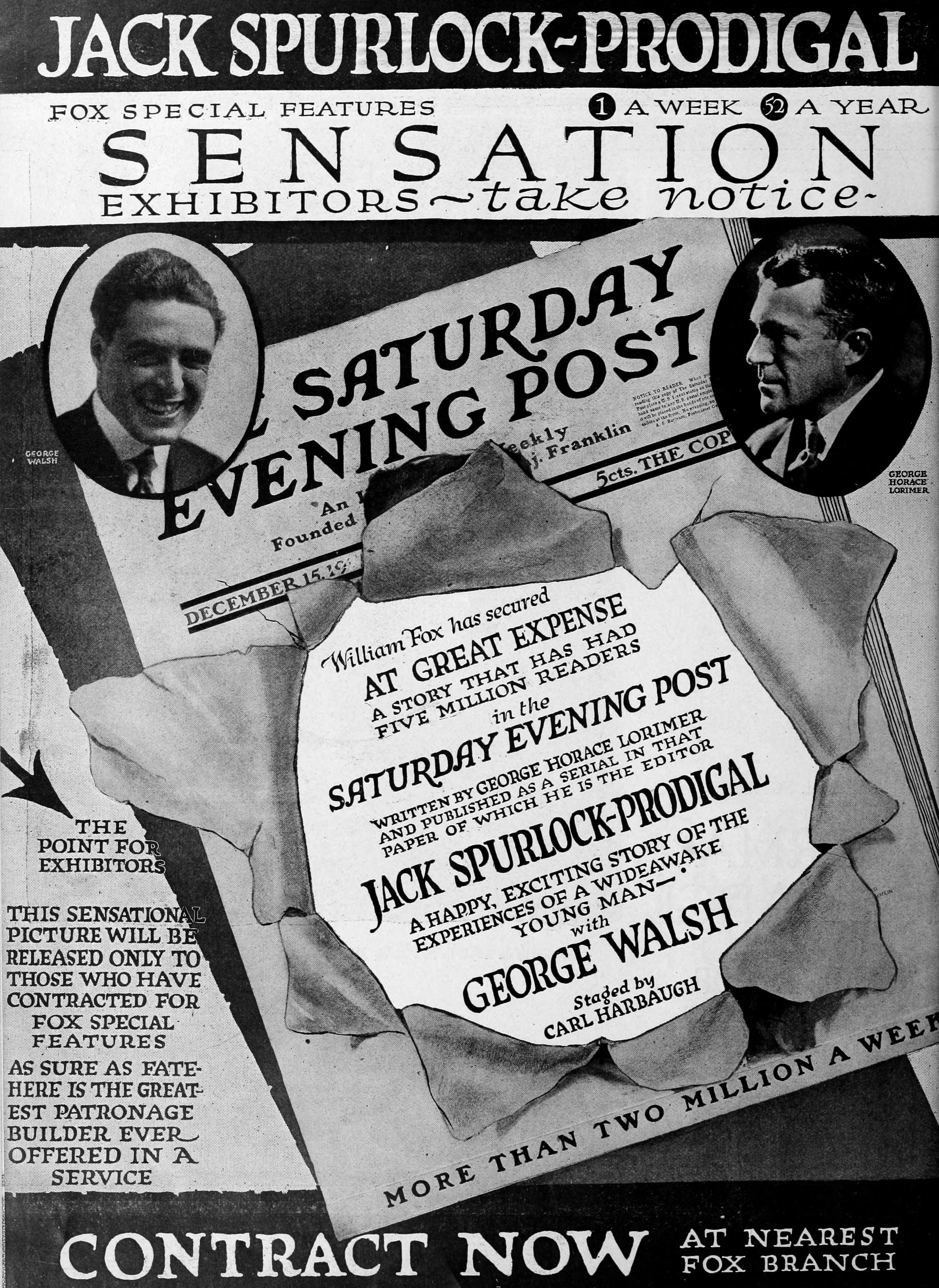
- Advertisement of the film in January 5, 1918 issue of the Moving Picture World (pg. 24)
- Directed by: Carl Harbaugh
- Written by: Ralph R. Spence
- Based on: Jack Spurlock, Prodigal by George Horace Lorimer
- Starring: George Walsh; Dan Mason; Ruth Taylor
- Cinematography: Arthur Edeson
- Production company: Fox Film Corporation
- Distributed by: Fox Film Corporation
- Release date: February 10, 1918
- Running time: 5 reels
- Country: United States
- Languages: Silent film (English intertitles)

Jack Spurlock, Prodigal is a 1918 American silent comedy film directed by Carl Harbaugh and starring George Walsh, Dan Mason, and Ruth Taylor. It is based on the best-selling 1908 novel of the same name by George Horace Lorimer which is first published as a serial in the Saturday Evening Post. The film was released by Fox Film Corporation on February 10, 1918, as a Special Features release.

Another film adaptation under by the name A Self-Made Man was later released in 1922, which stars William Russell as Jack Spurlock.

== Plot ==
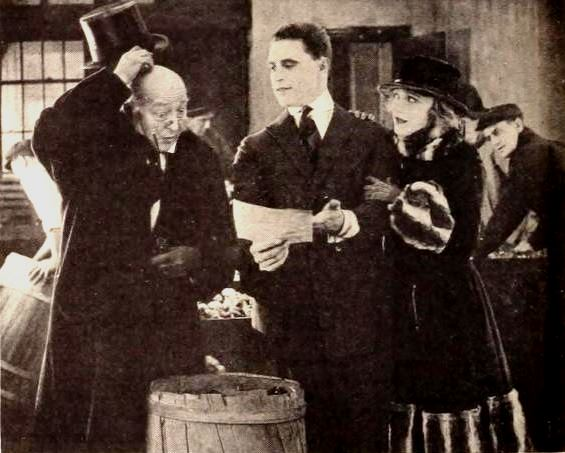
Still of George Walsh, Mason, and Taylor

As described in a film magazine, Jack Spurlock is expelled from Harvard because of his many wild exploits around Boston. He capped the climax of these wild times when he returned to the dormitories one night after a hot time at the cabarets in Boston with a bear. All would have been well and the incident would have passed off as a joke, had not the animal insisted upon slapping one of the professors. So out Jack went. Jack's father is a wealthy business man and owner of a chain of grocery stores. When Jack announces that he has been expelled from college, his father decides to put him to work.

Jack is sent to the branch to assist in the purchasing department. At that time the Spurlock stores had a surplus quantity of onions, and Jack not being acquainted with this condition in the onion stock orders 150 more car loads. This brings on a strike among the Spurlock employees. Jack joins the strikers and when it is settled he finds himself out of a job and his father with 150 car loads of onions on his hands. Jack then tries his hand at a waiter's job in a silent restaurant. Too lively for the job, he is fired and goes to work as a physical culture demonstrator. He meets Col. Jackson, who has perfected a "cure all" remedy, the chief ingredient of which is the onion. Jack arranges for the disposed of his father's surplus stock of onions and is placed in the good graces of the family.

== Cast ==
- George Walsh as Jack Spurlock
- Dan Mason as Spurlock Sr.
- Ruth Taylor as Anita Grey
- Robert Vivian as Col. Jackson
- Mike Donlin
- Jack Goodman

== Production ==
William Fox states at the time that he paid George Horace Lorimer more for the privilege of filming Jack Spurlock, Prodigal than he ever before paid for a similar privilege. Lead actor George Walsh said he enjoy his work in this film, describing as the "best he ever did".

The director, Carl Harbaugh, proclaims his willingness to be judged as a director by the results he obtained in the film story.

== Release ==
The film was initially scheduled to be released on January 27 but bad weather conditions preventing some retakes forcing delays up to February 3 and later 10th.

== Preservation ==
No known prints are known to exist, making the film lost.
