= The Face in the Dark =

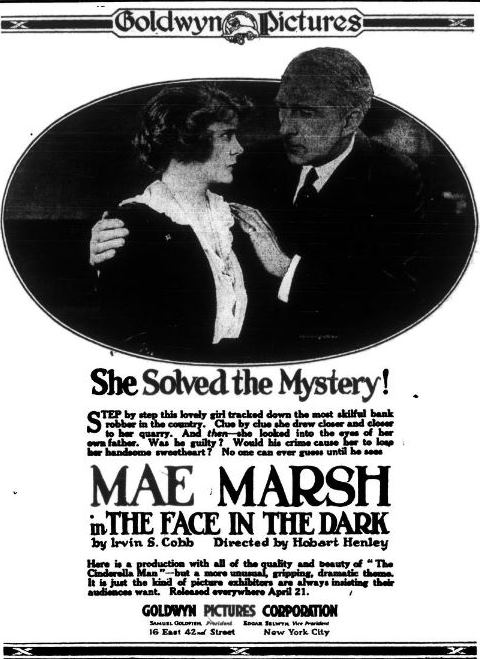
- Directed by: Hobart Henley
- Written by: Tom Bret; Irvin S. Cobb
- Produced by: Samuel Goldwyn
- Starring: Mae Marsh; Niles Welch; Alec B. Francis
- Cinematography: J.C. Bitzer
- Production company: Goldwyn Pictures
- Distributed by: Goldwyn Distributing
- Release date: April 15, 1918
- Running time: 60 minutes
- Country: United States
- Languages: Silent; English intertitles

The Face in the Dark is a 1918 American silent mystery film directed by Hobart Henley and starring Mae Marsh, Niles Welch and Alec B. Francis. The film's sets were designed by the art director Hugo Ballin.

== Cast ==
- Mae Marsh as Jane Ridgeway
- Niles Welch as Richard Grant
- Alec B. Francis as Charles Ridgeway
- Harry Myers as Jim Weaver
- Donald Hall as Nixon
- Joseph W. Smiley as CharlesHammond
- Isabel Lamon as Rosalind Hammond
- Alice Wilson as Mrs. Hammond

== Bibliography ==
- Ken Wlaschin. Silent Mystery and Detective Movies: A Comprehensive Filmography. McFarland, 2009.
