= Corinne Barker =

American actress and costume designer (1890–1928)

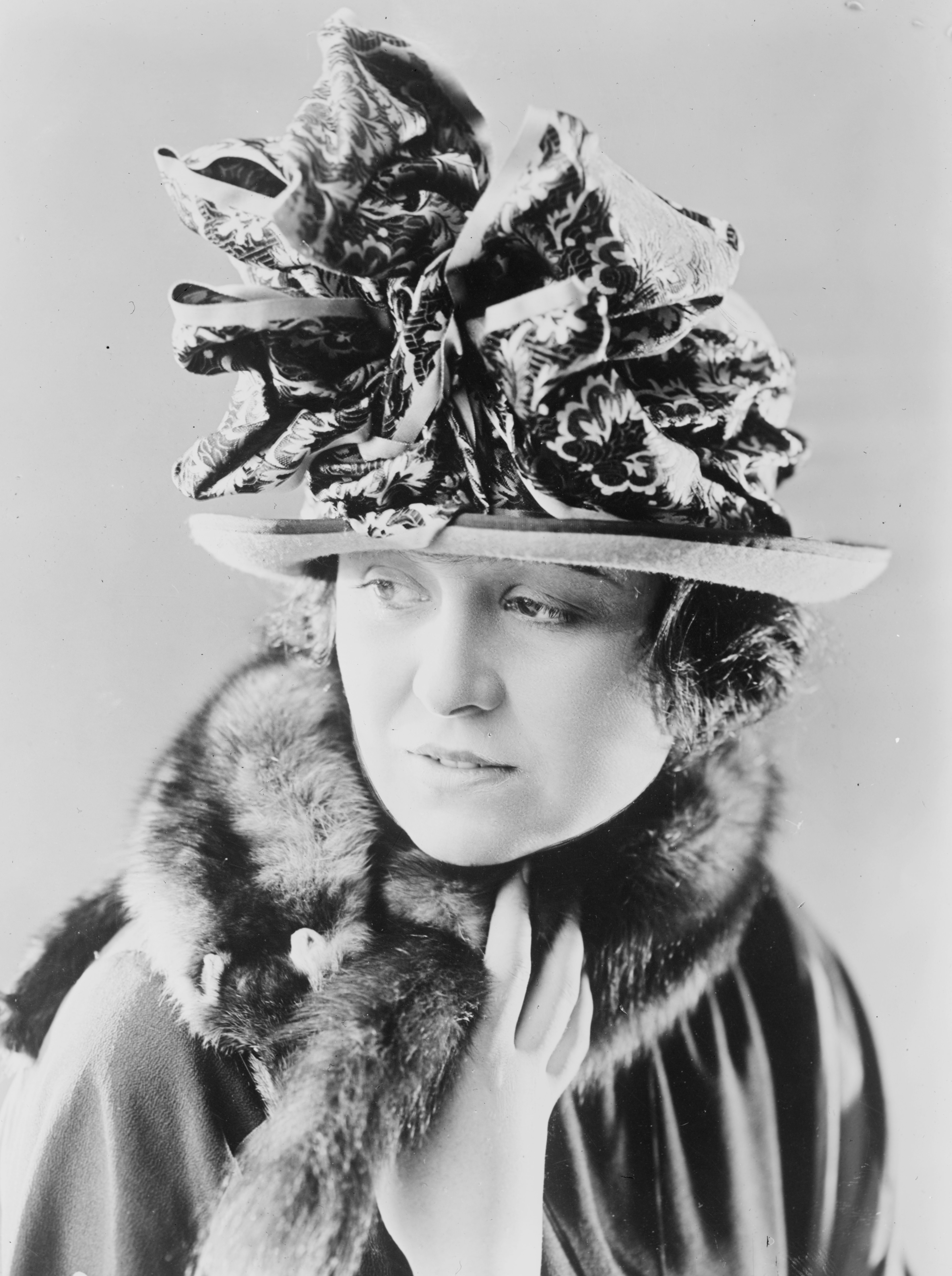
- Barker, c. 1921
- Born: Corinne Riely; June 5, 1890; Salem, Oregon, U.S.
- Died: August 6, 1928 (aged 38); New York City, New York, U.S.
- Resting place: River View Cemetery, Portland, Oregon, U.S.
- Known for: The Restless Sex; Enchantment
- Spouse: William Barker Hobart Henley (m. 1920)

Corinne Barker (née Riely; June 5, 1890 – August 6, 1928) was an American actress and costume designer who came to prominence during the silent era, specifically for her roles in several Vitagraph films. She also appeared in several Broadway productions as well as two films with Marion Davies: The Restless Sex (1920) and Enchantment (1921).

After making the transition to theater in the 1920s, Barker began working as a costume designer in Manhattan, working under Vincent Youmans. Upon returning to the United States from Europe in July 1928, Barker developed peritonitis from food poisoning, of which she died on August 6, 1928.

== Life and career ==
=== Early life ===
Barker was born Corinne Riely on June 5, 1890 in Salem, Oregon, (Note: Though some sources state Barker's birth year as 1893, her 1921 U.S. passport application from the state of New York states that she was born June 5, 1890 in Salem, Oregon.) to Charles Strang and Amelia (née Savage) Riely. She was educated at the Academy of the Sacred Heart in Salem. Her father was also a native of Salem, and a prominent businessman there and in Portland, Oregon.

=== Film and theater career ===
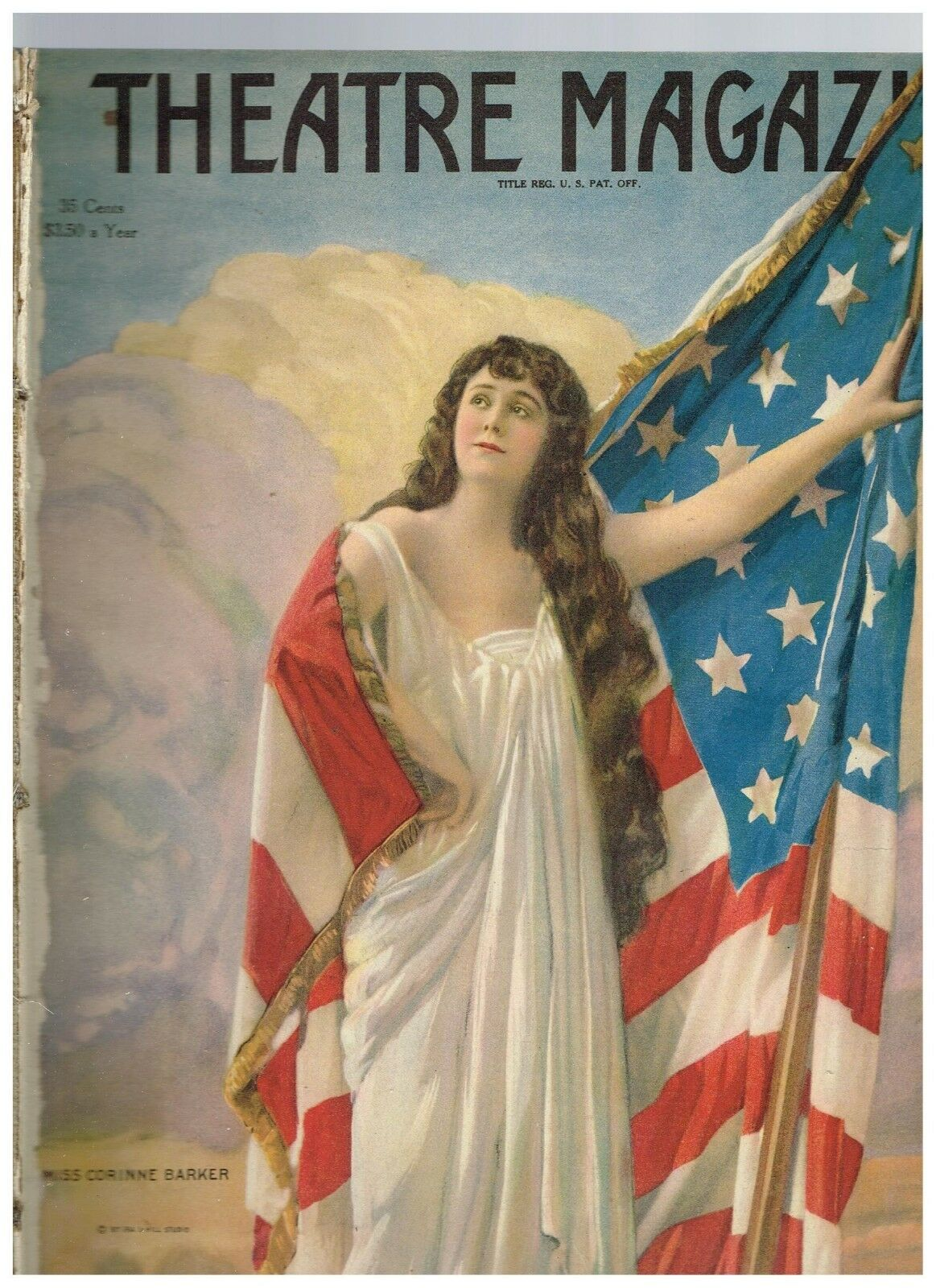
Barker featured on the cover of a trade magazine, 1918

She began acting in theater productions in Portland in the early-1900s. She moved from Portland to New York City in 1910, and appeared in a stage production of The Crinoline Girl with Julian Eltinge. She married William Barker in Portland some time prior to 1916.

Barker began appearing in films in 1918, debuting in Money Mad. Her second film appearance in Peck's Bad Girl (1918) was praised by Variety, which noted: "Corinne Barker as the wily Hortense could not have been better cast." She appeared in a handful of features in 1919, including One Week of Life, The Peace of Roaring River, and The Climbers, the latter of which starred Corinne Griffith. She subsequently had a supporting role opposite Marion Davies in the drama The Restless Sex (1920). Barker married actor Hobart Henley in New York City in July 1920, after which she appeared in Why Girls Leave Home (1921), and Enchantment (also 1921), the latter of which also starred Davies.

In New York, Barker worked as a stage actress as well as a costume designer, designing the costumes for a 1926 Broadway production of No, No, Nanette. In late 1927, she began designing costumes for Vincent Youmans' stage productions. She resided on the Upper West Side at 78th Street with husband Henley and her mother.

== Death ==
Barker was admitted to Mount Sinai Hospital in Manhattan on July 19, 1928, shortly after returning to the United States from Europe, suffering from peritonitis. It was reported on July 27 that her condition had stemmed from food poisoning and that she was in "serious condition." Barker died a little over a week later on August 6, 1928.

Her funeral service was held at the Church of Transfiguration in Manhattan. Barker is interred at River View Cemetery in Portland, Oregon.

== Filmography ==
Key
†	Denotes a lost or presumed lost film.

Year	Title	Role	Notes	Ref.
1918	Money Mad †	Fanette		
1918	Peck's Bad Girl †	Hortense Martinot		
1919	One Week of Life †	Lola Canby		
1919	The Peace of Roaring River †	Sophy McGurn		
1919	The Climbers	Julia Godesby		
1919	The Golden Shower †	Gaby		
1919	The Broken Melody †	Mrs. Drexel Trask		
1920	The Silent Barrier †	Millicent Jacques		
1920	The Restless Sex	Helen West		
1921	Why Girls Leave Home †	Ethel, a gold-digger		
1921	Enchantment	Nalia McCabe		

== Stage credits ==
Year	Title	Role	Notes	Ref.
1915–1916	Abe and Mawruss		Broadway	
1916–1917	Shirley Kaye		Broadway	
1917	On with the Dance		Broadway	
1918–1919	Remnant		Broadway	
1925–1926	No, No, Nanette	—N/a	Broadway; costume supervisor	
