= Pauline Frederick =

American actress (1883–1938)

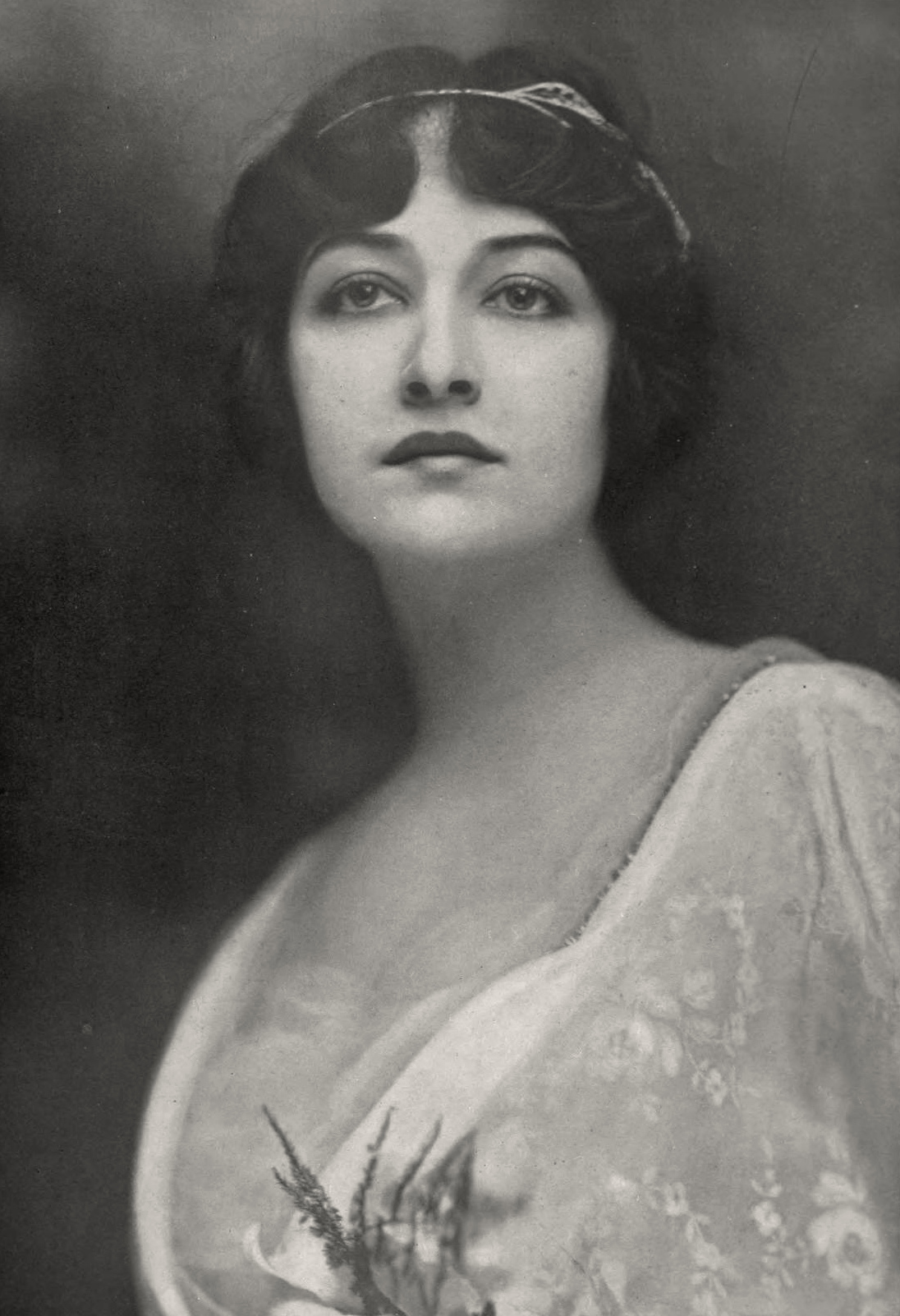
- Frederick in 1914
- Born: Pauline Beatrice Libbey; August 12, 1883; Boston, Massachusetts, U.S.
- Died: September 19, 1938 (aged 55); Beverly Hills, California, U.S.
- Resting place: Grand View Memorial Park Cemetery
- Occupation: Actress
- Years active: 1902–1937
- Spouses: Frank Mills Andrews (m. 1909; div. 1913) Willard Mack (m. 1917; div. 1920) Dr. C.A. Rutherford (m. 1922; div. 1925) Hugh C. Leighton (m. 1930; ann. 1930) Col. Joseph A. Marmon (m. 1934; died 1934)

Signature
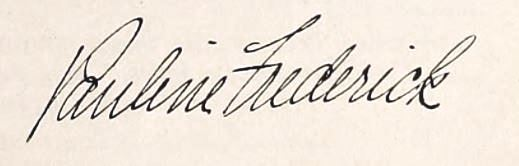

Pauline Frederick (born Pauline Beatrice Libbey; August 12, 1883 – September 19, 1938) was an American stage and film actress.

== Early life ==
Frederick was born Pauline Beatrice Libbey (later changed to Libby) in Boston in 1883 (some sources state 1884 or 1885), the only child of Richard O. and Loretta C. Libbey. Her father worked as a yardmaster for the Old Colony Railroad before becoming a salesman. Her parents separated when she was a toddler and Frederick was raised primarily by her mother with whom she remained close for the remainder of her life (her parents divorced around 1897). As a girl, she was fascinated with show business, and determined early to place her goals in the direction of the theater. She studied acting, singing and dancing at Miss Blanchard's Finishing School in Boston where she later graduated.

Her father, however, discouraged her ambitions to be an actress and encouraged her to become an elocution teacher. After pursuing a career as an actress, her father disinherited her (he died in 1922). Due to her father's attitude towards her acting career, Pauline adopted the surname "Frederick" as her stage name. She legally changed her name to Pauline Frederick in 1908.

== Career ==
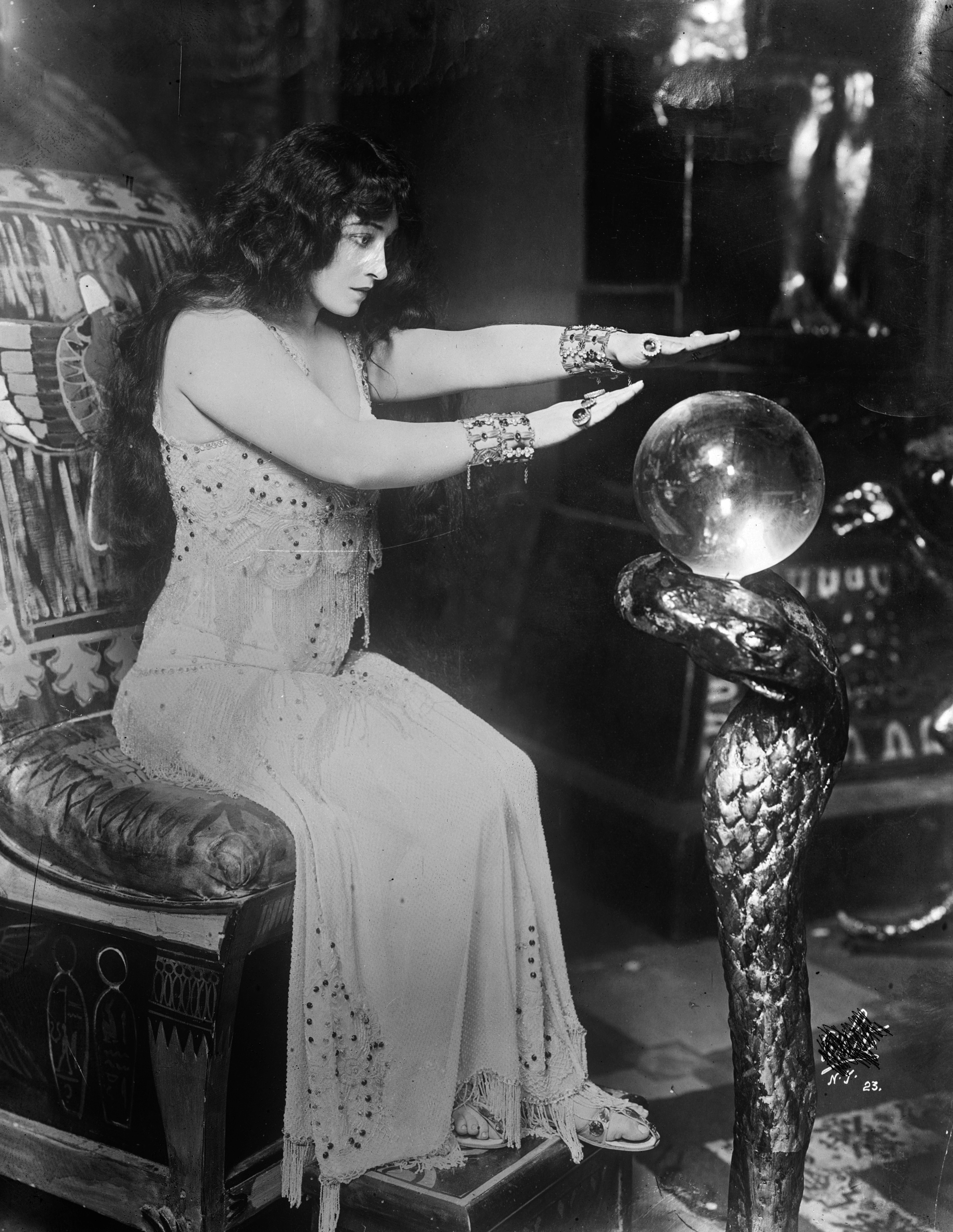
Pauline Frederick as Potiphar's wife from the play Joseph and His Brethren (1913)

She made her stage debut at the age of 17 as a chorus girl in the farce The Rogers Brothers at Harvard, but was fired shortly thereafter. She won other small roles on the stage before being discovered by an illustrator, Harrison Fisher who called her "the purest American beauty." With Fisher's help, she landed more substantial stage roles. Nicknamed "The Girl with the Topaz Eyes", Frederick was cast in the lead roles in the touring productions of The Little Gray Lady and The Girl in White in 1906. She briefly retired from acting after her first marriage in 1909, but returned to the stage in January 1913 in Joseph and His Brethren.

A well-known stage star, Frederick was already in her 30s when she made her film debut in 1915 as Donna Roma in The Eternal City. In March 1927, she received some of her better reviews when she appeared in the play Madame X in London. Frederick was able to make a successful transition to "talkies" in 1929, and was cast as Joan Crawford's mother in This Modern Age (1931). Frederick did not like acting in sound films and returned to Broadway in 1932 in When the Bough Breaks. She would continue the remainder of her career appearing in films and also touring in stage productions in the United States, Europe and Australia.

== Personal life ==
Frederick's personal life was beset with marital and financial problems. Despite having reportedly made $1 million for her work in silent films, Frederick filed for bankruptcy in 1933.

Frederick was married five times. In 1909, she married architect Frank Mills Andrews. Frederick then briefly retired from acting after their daughter Pauline was born in 1910, but returned upon divorcing Andrews in 1913. She married her second husband, playwright Willard Mack, on September 27, 1917. They divorced in August 1920. Her third husband was Dr. Charles A. Rutherford, a physician, whom she married in Santa Ana, California in 1922. Frederick filed for divorce in December 1924. Their divorce was finalized on January 6, 1925.

It was around this time that the then 43-year-old first met the much younger Clark Gable, then a struggling actor, with whom she allegedly had a two-year affair.

Frederick married her fourth husband, millionaire hotel and Interstate News Company owner Hugh Chisholm Leighton on April 20, 1930, in New York City. Leighton had the marriage annulled in December 1930, claiming that he was Frederick's husband "in name only".

Frederick's fifth marriage, in January 1934, was to an ailing United States Army colonel, Joseph A. Marmon, commander of the 16th Infantry Regiment. They remained married until Marmon's death on December 4, 1934.

== Death ==
On January 17, 1936, Frederick underwent emergency surgery on her abdomen. Her health steadily declined, which limited her ability to work. She was dealt another blow when her mother died in 1937.

On September 16, 1938, Frederick suffered an asthma attack. She suffered a second, fatal asthma attack on September 19, 1938, while she was recuperating at her aunt's home in Beverly Hills. According to her wishes, a private funeral was held on September 23, 1938, in Hollywood, after which she was buried at Grand View Memorial Park Cemetery in Glendale, California.

For her contribution to the motion picture industry, Pauline Frederick has a star on the Hollywood Walk of Fame at 7000 Hollywood Boulevard.

== Filmography ==
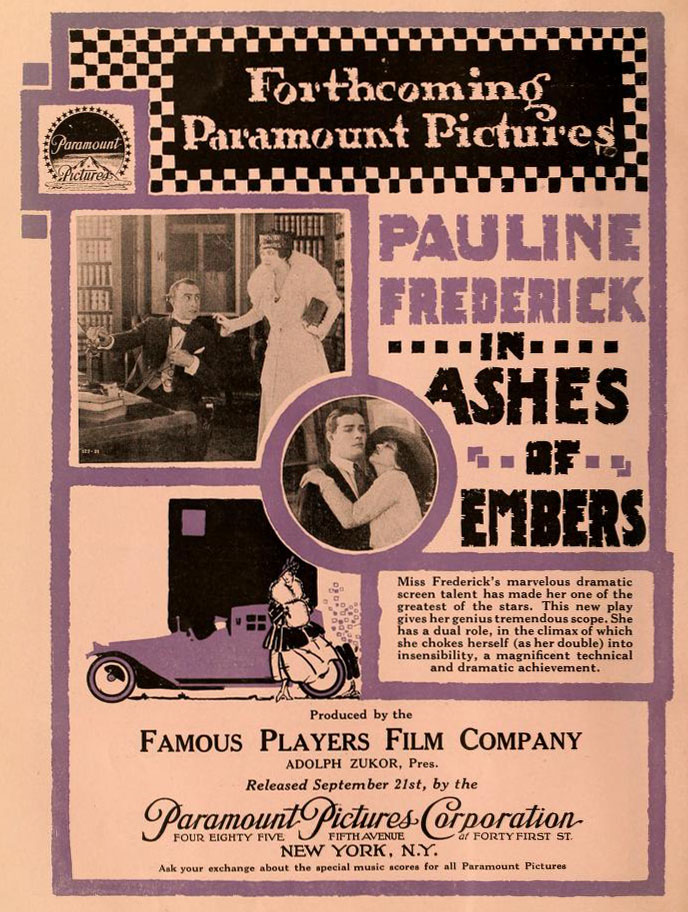
Ashes of Embers (1916)

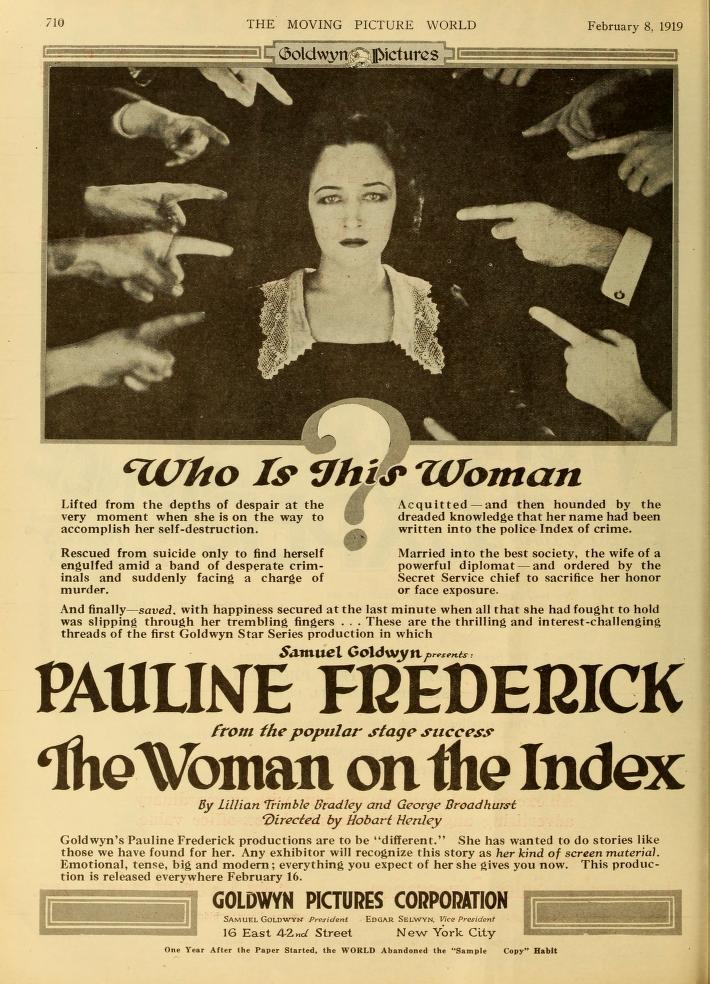
The Woman on the Index (1919)

Year	Title	Role	Notes
1915	The Eternal City	Donna Roma	Lost film
1915	Sold	Helen	Lost film
1915	Zaza	ZaZa	Lost film
1915	Bella Donna	Bella Donna (Ruby Chepstow)	Lost film
1915	Lydia Gilmore	Lydia Gilmore	Lost film
1916	The Spider	Valerie St. Cyr/Joan Marche	Lost film
1916	Audrey	Audrey	Lost film
1916	The Moment Before	Madge	A 35mm nitrate copy of the film is housed at the Cineteca Nazionale film archive in Rome. The print is missing one sequence described as "the opening scene before the flashback."
1916	The World's Great Snare	Myra	Lost film
1916	The Woman in the Case	Margaret Rolfe	Incomplete, with its final reel missing
1916	Ashes of Embers	Laura Ward/Agnes Ward	Lost film
1916	Nanette of the Wilds	Nanette Gauntier	Lost film
1917	The Slave Market	Ramona	Lost film
1917	Sapho	Sapho, aka Fanny Lagrand	Lost film
1917	Sleeping Fires	Zelma Bryce	Lost film
1917	Her Better Self	Vivian Tyler	Lost film
1917	The Love That Lives	Molly McGill	
1917	Double Crossed	Eleanor Stratton	Lost film
1917	The Hungry Heart	Courtney Vaughan	Lost film
1918	Mrs. Dane's Defense	Felicia Hindemarsh	Lost film
1918	Madame Jealousy	Madame Jealousy	Lost film
1918	La Tosca	Floria Tosca	Lost film
1918	Resurrection	Katusha	Lost film
1918	Her Final Reckoning	Marsa	Lost film
1918	Fedora	Princess Fedora	Lost film
1918	Stake Uncle Sam to Play Your Hand	Miss Liberty Loan	Lost film Short subject
1918	A Daughter of the Old South	Dolores Jardine	Lost film
1919	Out of the Shadow	Ruth Minchin	Lost film
1919	The Woman on the Index	Sylvia Martin	Lost film
1919	Paid in Full	Emma Brooks	Lost film Final Famous Players–Lasky / Paramount feature
1919	One Week of Life	Mrs. Sherwood & Marion Roche	Lost film
1919	The Fear Woman	Helen Winthrop	Lost film
1919	The Peace of Roaring River	Madge Nelson	Lost film
1919	Bonds of Love	Una Sayre	Lost film
1919	The Loves of Letty	Letty Shell	Incomplete
1920	The Paliser Case	Cassy Cara	Lost film
1920	The Woman in Room 13	Laura Bruce	Lost film
1920	Madame X	Jacqueline Floriot	
1920	A Slave of Vanity	Iris Bellamy	Lost film First Robertson-Cole release
1921	The Mistress of Shenstone	Lady Myra Ingleby	Incomplete version survives
1921	Roads of Destiny	Dolly Jordan Lennon	Lost film Final Goldwyn Pictures release
1921	Salvage	Bernice Ridgeway/Kate Martin	Lost film
1921	The Sting of the Lash	Dorothy Keith	Lost film
1921	The Lure of Jade	Sara Vincent	Lost film
1922	The Woman Breed		
1922	Two Kinds of Women	Judith Sanford	Lost film
1922	The Glory of Clementina	Clementina Wing	Lost film
1924	Let Not Man Put Asunder	Petrina Faneuil	Lost film
1924	Married Flirts	Nellie Wayne	Lost film
1924	Three Women	Mrs. Mabel Wilton	
1925	Smouldering Fires	Jane Vale	
1926	Her Honor, the Governor	Adele Fenway	
1926	Devil's Island	Jeannette Picto	
1926	Josselyn's Wife	Lillian Josselyn	Lost film
1927	Mumsie	Mumsie	Lost film
1927	The Nest	Mrs. Hamilton	
1928	On Trial	Joan Trask	Lost film
1929	Evidence	Myra Stanhope	Lost film
1929	The Sacred Flame	Mrs. Taylor - the Mother	Lost film
1930	Terra Melophon Magazin Nr. 1	Die Zofe	Episode: "Was Ziehe ich an, Bevor ich mich anziehe"
1931	This Modern Age	Diane "Di" Winters	
1932	Wayward	Mrs. Eleanor Frost	
1932	The Phantom of Crestwood	Faith Andes	
1932	Self Defense	Katy Devoux	
1934	Social Register	Mrs. Breene	
1935	My Marriage	Mrs. DeWitt Tyler II	
1936	Ramona	Señora Moreno	
1937	Thank You, Mr. Moto	Madame Chung	
