= The Broken Melody (1919 film) =

1919 film

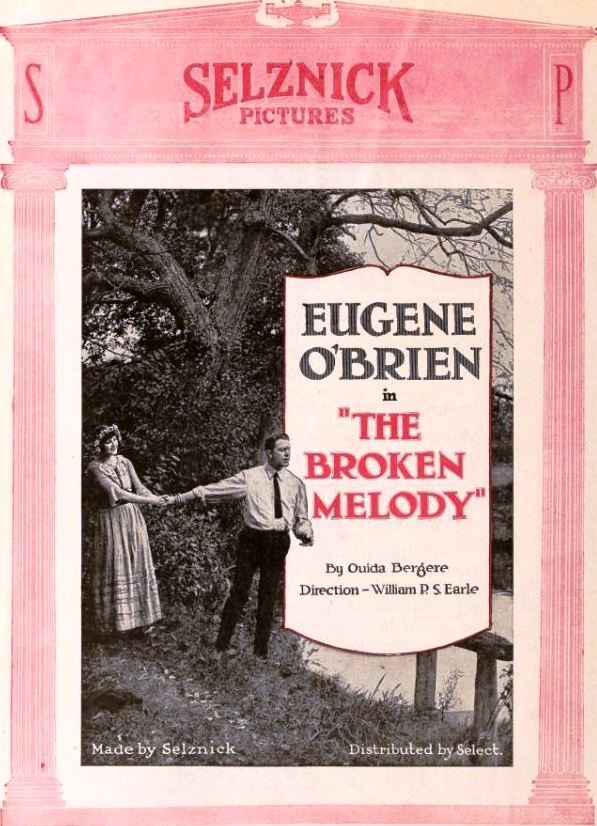
- Ad for the film from a 1919 issue of Exhibitors Herald
- Directed by: William P.S. Earle
- Written by: Ouida Bergère; Dorothy Farnum
- Produced by: Lewis J. Selznick
- Starring: Eugene O'Brien; Lucy Cotton; Corinne Barker
- Cinematography: John W. Brown
- Edited by: W. Duncan Mansfield
- Production company: Selznick Pictures
- Distributed by: Select Pictures Corp.
- Release date: December 14, 1919
- Running time: 50 minutes
- Country: United States
- Languages: Silent; English intertitles

The Broken Melody is a 1919 American silent drama film directed by William P.S. Earle and starring Eugene O'Brien, Lucy Cotton and Corinne Barker. Location shooting for the film was done in Greenwich Village in New York City.

== Cast ==
- Eugene O'Brien as Stewart Grant
- Lucy Cotton as Hedda Dana
- Corinne Barker as Mrs. Drexel Trask
- Donald Hall as Howard Thornby
- Ivo Dawson as Leroy Clemons
- Gus Weinberg as Ivan

== Preservation ==
With no prints of The Broken Melody located in any film archives, it is considered a lost film. In October 2019, the film was cited by the National Film Preservation Board on their Lost U.S. Silent Feature Films list.

== Bibliography ==
- Connelly, Robert B. The Silents: Silent Feature Films, 1910-36, Volume 40, Issue 2. December Press, 1998.
- Munden, Kenneth White. The American Film Institute Catalog of Motion Pictures Produced in the United States, Part 1. University of California Press, 1997.
