= Alice Wilson (actress) =

American stage and silent film actress

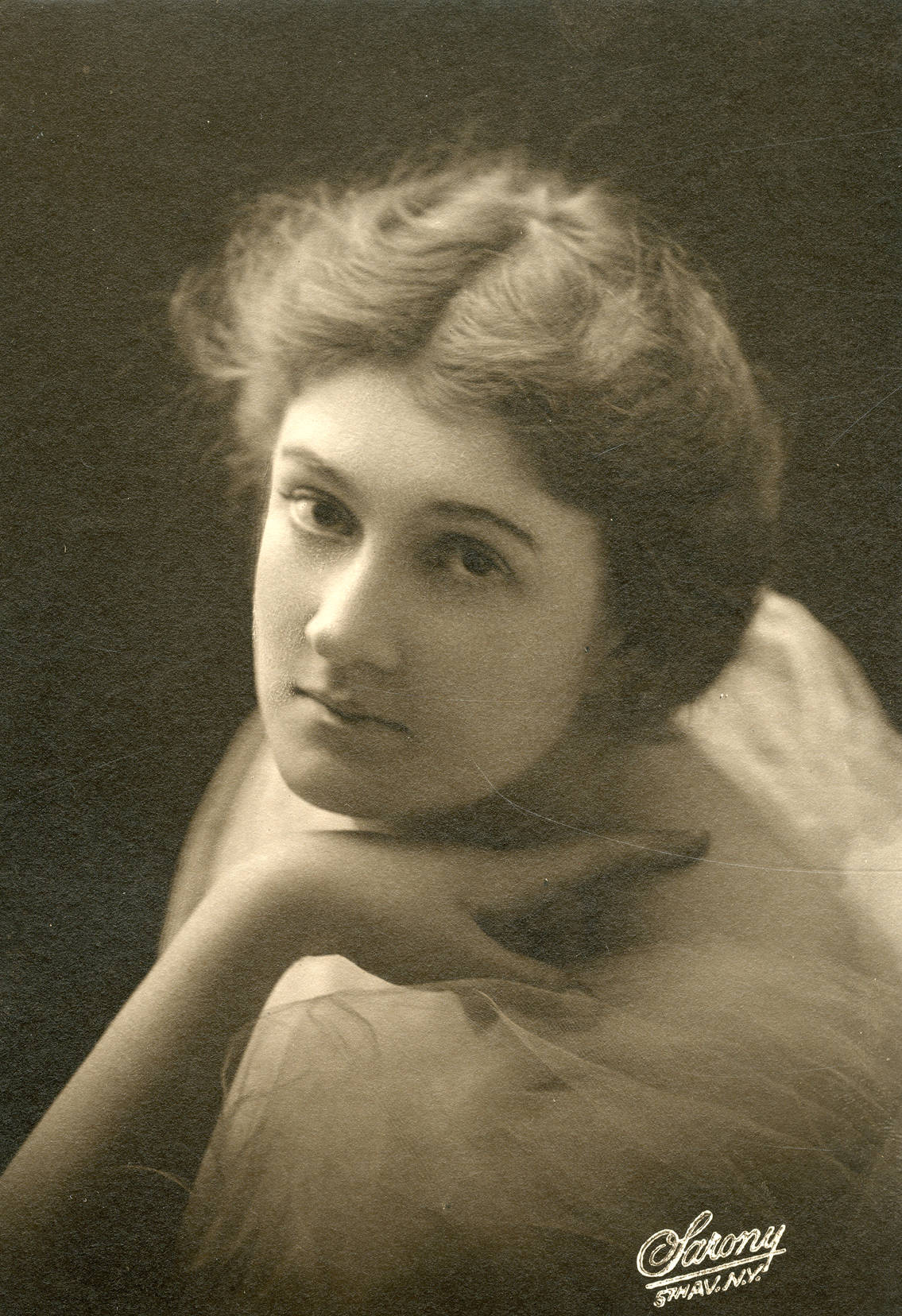

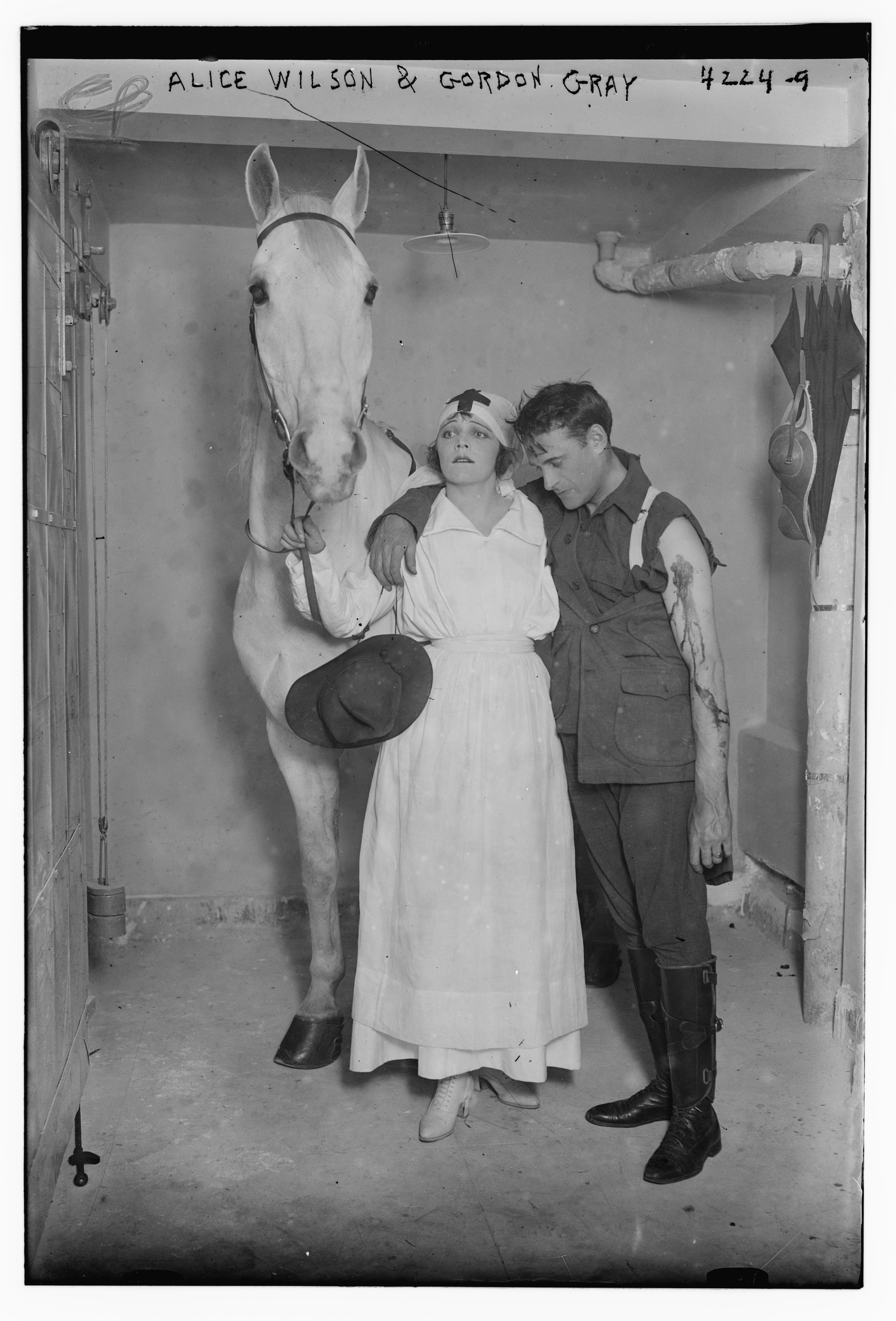
With Gordon Gray and a horse

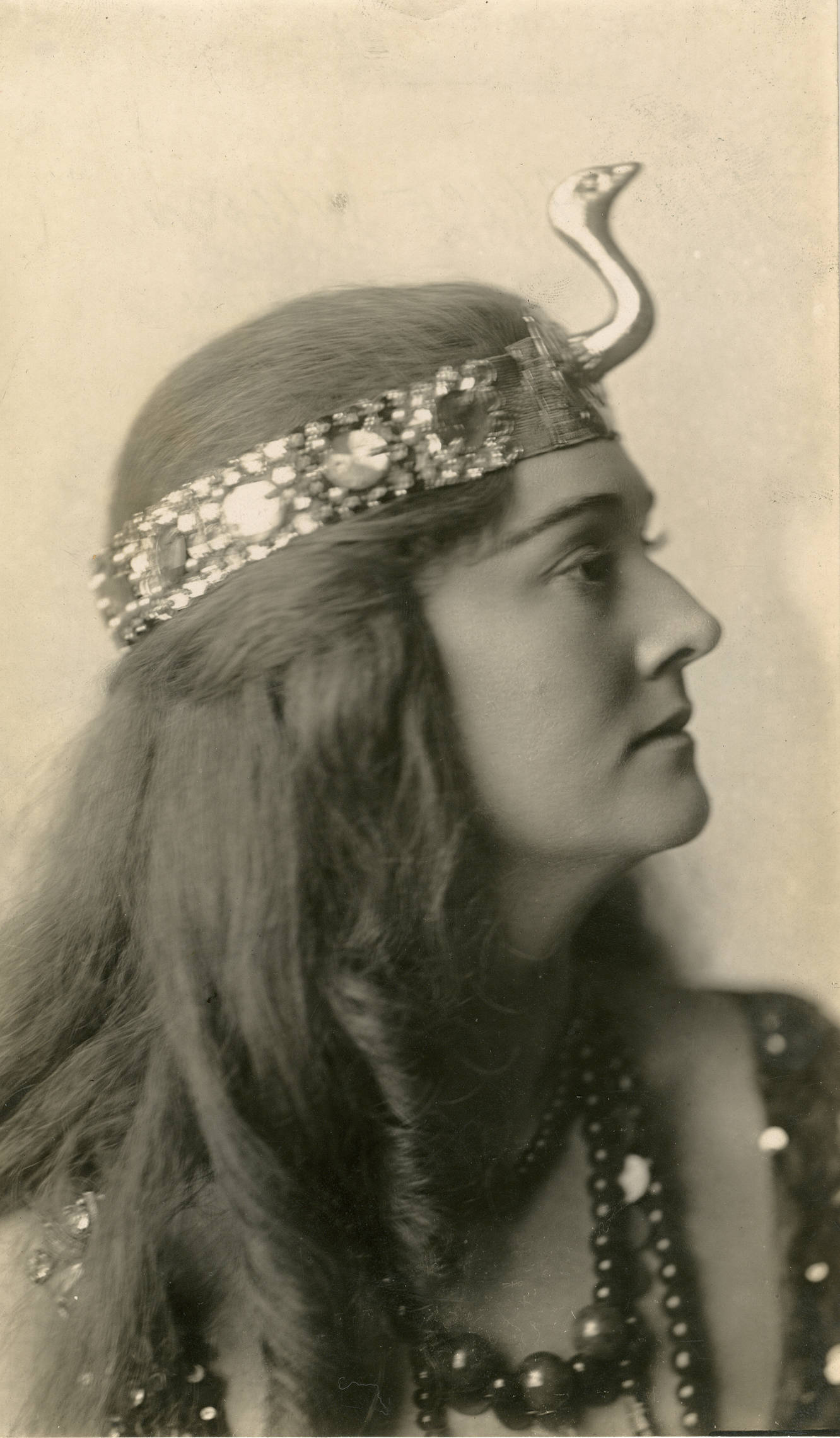
Photograph of stage actress Alice Wilson in 1908

Alice Wilson (née Rae; June 14, 1887 – May 12, 1944), born in O'Fallon, Missouri, was an American stage and silent film actress. She began her career performing on Broadway in the early 1900s and later appeared in silent films during the 1910s and 1920s. Her film appearances include The Children in the House (1916), La Belle Russe (1919), and Silk Stocking Sal (1924). Wilson was sometimes credited under the names Alice Rae, Alice Ray, or Alice Browning.

She was the second wife of film director Tod Browning, and remained married to him until her death. She died in Los Angeles in 1944 of complications from pneumonia.

== Theater ==
- A Message from Mars (October 17, 1904 - November 1904)
- The Toast of the Town (November 27, 1905 - December 30, 1905)
- The Chaperon (December 30, 1908 - February 1909)
- The Next of Kin (December 27, 1909 - January 1910)
- We Can't Be as Bad as All That (December 30, 1910 - January 1911)

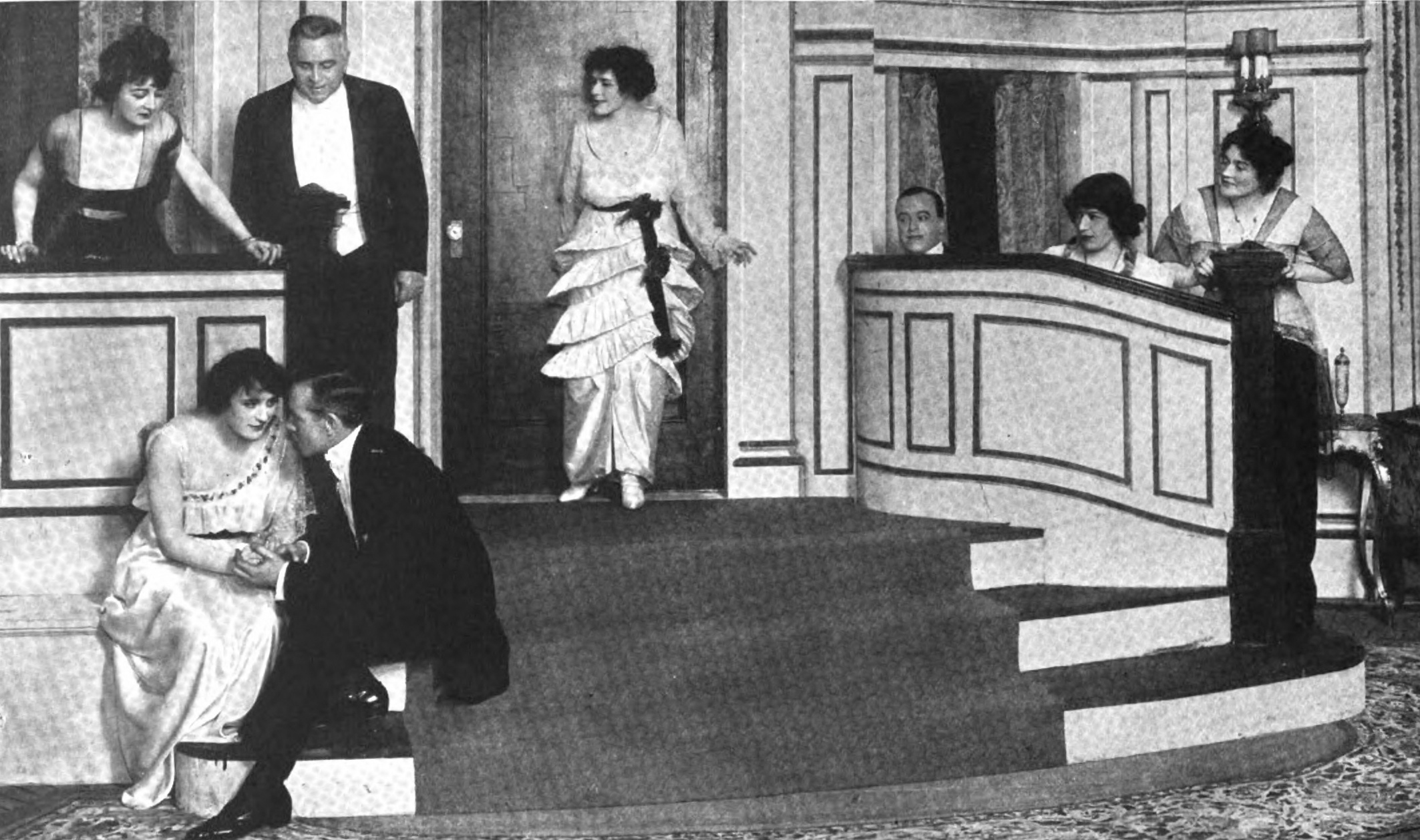
At far right in Misleading Lady (1914)

- The Misleading Lady (November 25, 1913 - May 1914)
- Peter Ibbetson (April 17, 1917 - June 1917)

== Filmography ==
- The Children in the House (1916)
- Should She Obey? (1917)
- A Love Sublime (1917) as The Sculptress (as Alice Rae)
- The Brazen Beauty (1918) as Kate Dewey
- The Eyes of Julia Deep (1918) as Lottie Driscoll
- The Face in the Dark (1918) as Mrs. Hammond
- La Belle Russe (1919) as Lady Sackton
- The Little Wanderer (1920) as Kit
- Passion's Playground (1920) as Dodo Wardrop
- The Willow Tree (1920 film) as Mary Fuller
- The Dream Cheater (1920) as Mimi Gascoigne
- What's Your Husband Doing? (1920) as Sylvia Pennywise
- Silk Stocking Sal (1924) as Bargain Basement Annie (credited as Alice Browning)
