= One Week of Life =

1919 film by Hobart Henley

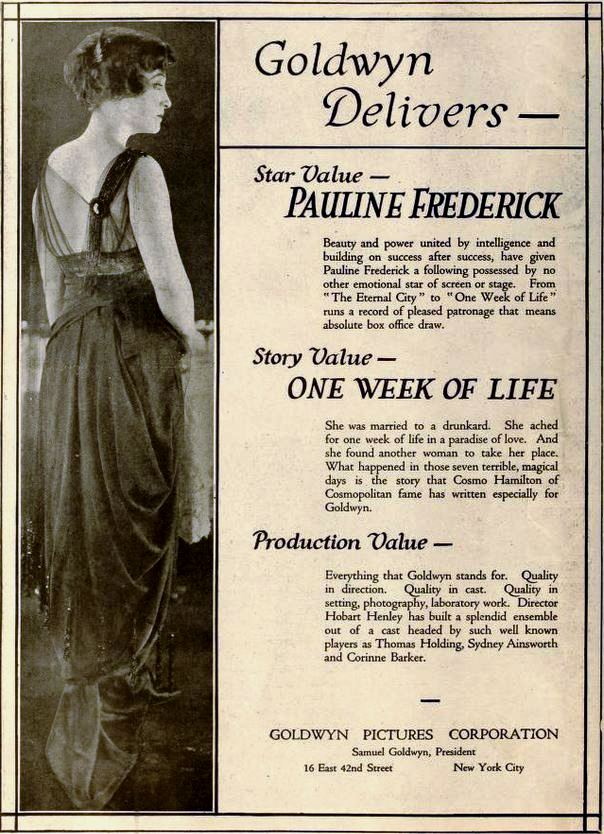
- Advertisement
- Directed by: Hobart Henley
- Written by: Willard Mack
- Story by: Cosmo Hamilton
- Produced by: Samuel Goldwyn
- Starring: Pauline Frederick
- Cinematography: Edward Gheller
- Distributed by: Goldwyn Pictures
- Release date: May 18, 1919
- Running time: 50 minutes
- Country: United States
- Language: Silent (English intertitles)

One Week of Life is a 1919 American silent drama film produced and distributed through Goldwyn Pictures. It was directed by Hobart Henley and starred Pauline Frederick.

== Plot ==
As described in a film magazine, Mrs. Sherwood finds life unbearable with her drunken husband Kingsley Sherwood and longs for "one week of life" with LeRoy Scott, her lying lover. She considers herself alone, making no attempt to redeem the weakling she had promised to honor and obey. Her lover finds an almost exact duplicate of her in young Marion Roche, discusses the situation with both women, and plans a substitution where Marion takes the place of Mrs. Sherwood while the later pretends to visit a child that is ill. LeRoy escapes with the erring Mrs. Sherwood, but Marion's situation becomes complicated when Kingsley sees finer qualities in his supposed wife than in the real Mrs. Sherwood. At Marion's suggestion, Kingsley tries to give up drinking. He does not suspect any substitution until he finds a letter that Marion has dropped, and he sets a trap to discover her purpose. He manages to enter her bedroom after she returns at night from a friendly visit, and it is exposed that his wife never left to visit a sick child, because there never was one. Marion is overwhelmed, but she has become interested in the plucky self-struggle Kingsley has put up, while he attributes his reform to her encouragement. As they become interested in each other word comes that the erring wife and her lover have been drowned while out in a canoe. In the end there is the redeemed man and the woman responsible for his redemption.

== Cast ==
- Pauline Frederick as Mrs. Sherwood / Marion Roche
- Thomas Holding as Kingsley Sherwood
- Sidney Ainsworth as LeRoy Scott
- Corinne Barker as Lola Canby
- Percy Challenger

== Production ==
The plot involving the redemption of a drunken husband was timely given the passage of the Wartime Prohibition Act, which took effect June 30, 1919, and banned the sale of alcoholic beverages, and the ratification of the Eighteenth Amendment to the United States Constitution in January of the same year.

== Preservation ==
One Week of Life is currently presumed lost. In February of 2021, the film was cited by the National Film Preservation Board on their Lost U.S. Silent Feature Films list.

== See also ==
- List of lost films
