= Dan Mason =

American actor (1857–1929)

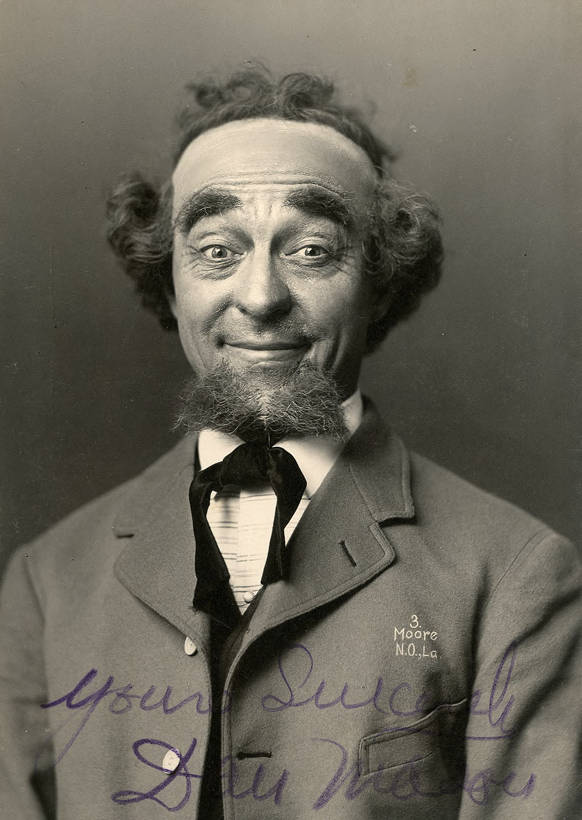
- Mason in 1902
- Born: Daniel Grassman; February 9, 1857; Syracuse, New York, U.S.
- Died: July 6, 1929 (aged 72); Bearsville, New York, U.S.
- Occupation: Actor
- Years active: 1913–1929

Dan Mason (born Daniel Grassman; February 9, 1857 – July 6, 1929) was an American actor. He appeared in more than one hundred films from 1913 to 1929. He performed as the "Skipper" in the "Toonerville Folks" comedy short films. He performed as Pop Tuttle in the Plump Center Comedies short films, for Paul Gerson Pictures Corporation.

== Career ==
From 1913 to 1915, Mason performed for Edison Studios with William Wadsworth, Gertrude McCoy and Arthur Housman.

From 1920 to 1922, Mason starred for the Betzwood Film Company (1912-1922), an organization distantly affiliated with the defunct Lubin Manufacturing Company (1902-1916), in the Toonerville Trolley Series: 17 two-reel short films.

They were adapted from Toonerville Folks an American newspaper comic strip by Fontaine Fox

They were directed by Ira M. Lowry (For the Freedom of the East), with Wilma Wild, Robert Maximilian, Helen Gerould Rose and Wilma Wilcox. All of the Toonerville films were directed by Ira M. Lowry, except for The Skipper's Treasure Garden, which was directed by Robert Eddy.

In the films, Dan Mason played the driver of a horse-drawn trolley in a small town.

The first of the series, The Toonerville Trolley That Meets all Trains, debuted in September 1920.

Only 7 films of the series are extant (still exist):

- The Skipper's Narrow Escape (1920)
- Boos-em Friends
- The Skipper's Flirtation
- The Skipper's Flirtation
- Toonerville Tactics
- The Skipper's Treasure Garden
- Toonerville's Fire Brigade

Other lost films in the series have been documented:

- The Skipper's Scheme
- The Skipper Has His Fling
- Toonerville Tangle
- The Skipper's Sermon (1922), directed by Ira M. Lowry

Dan Mason, who was 63, plays an old, tall, thin man with a long, white beard, who wears a cap.

Later, from August 1922 to May 1923, for Gerson Pictures Corporation, directed by Robert Eddy, Mason played Pop Tuttle in the Plump Center Comedies short films, set in an imaginary city, Plump Center, with performers: Wilna Hervey, Oliver J. Eckhart and Helen Howell:

- Pop Tuttle's Movie Queen (1922)
- Pop Tuttle's One Horse Play (1922)
- Pop Tuttle's Clever Catch (1922)
- Pop Tuttle, Fire Chief (1922)
- Pop Tuttle's Grass Widow (1922)
- Pop Tuttle, Deteckative (1922)
- Pop Tuttle's Long Shot (1923)
- Pop Tuttle's Polecat Plot (1923)
- Pop Tuttle's Lost Control (1923)
- Pop Tuttle's Lost Nerve (1923)
- Pop Tuttle's Russian Rumor (1923)
- Pop Tuttle's Tack-Tics (1923)

== Filmography ==
Year	Title	Role	Notes
1914	The Active Life of Dolly of the Dailies		
1917	Over the Hill	Reverend Timothy Neal	
1918	Jack Spurlock, Prodigal	Spurlock, Sr.	
1918	All Woman	Cabdriver	
1919	Lure of Ambition	Sylvester Dolan	
1921	Why Girls Leave Home	Dodo	
1922	Iron to Gold	Lem Baldwin	
1924	Conductor 1492	Mike O'Toole	
1924	Idle Tongues	Henry Ward Beecher Payson	
1925	Wages for Wives	Mr. Tevis	
1925	The Big Parade		
1925	Seven Sinners	Doctor	
1925	Sally	Pops Shendorf	
1926	The Fire Brigade	Peg Leg Murphy	
1927	The Hero on Horseback	Jimmie Breeze	
1927	Out All Night	Uncle	
