= Why Girls Leave Home (1921 film) =

1921 film

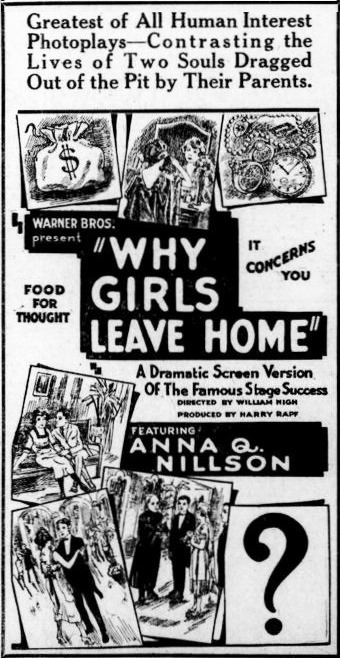
- Newspaper advertisement
- Directed by: William Nigh
- Written by: William Nigh
- Produced by: Harry Rapf
- Starring: Anna Q. Nilsson
- Cinematography: John W. Brown
- Production company: Harry Rapf Productions
- Distributed by: Warner Bros.
- Release date: July 1921 (US)
- Running time: 70-80 minutes (7-8 reels)
- Country: United States
- Language: Silent (English intertitles)
- Budget: $45,000
- Box office: $450,000 (worldwide rentals)

Why Girls Leave Home is a lost 1921 American silent drama film produced by Harry Rapf for Warner Bros. It was the only film from the studio to make a profit in 1921. The poster for the film was featured in the 1962 film Gypsy.

Why Girls Go Back Home (1926) is a sequel to the film that was also produced by Warner Bros.

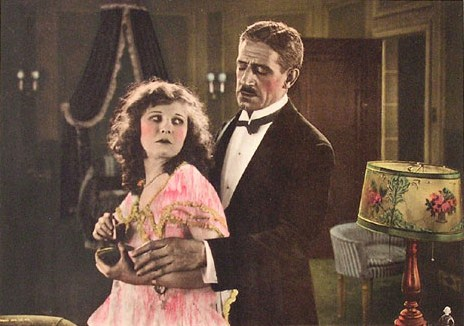
Cropped lobby card with Maurine Powers and Claude King

== Plot ==
Mr. Hedder (George Lessey) is an old fashioned man who will not let his daughter Anna (Anna Q. Nilsson) own an evening gown, but she is given one by a friend who is a model. Hedder believes that she stole it and confers with Mr. Wallace (Claude King), the owner of the store. On Wallace's advice, Hedder hits Anna, causing her to leave home and move in with some gold diggers. She discovers that Wallace is a lenient father, and his daughter, Madeline (Maurine Powers) frequents less-than-reputable nightclubs, and is also the pawn of Mr. Reynolds (Coit Albertson), who is dating her for business reasons. Anna discovers Madeline alone in Anna's apartment and uses this to get back at Wallace. She eventually sends Madeline home, and the two fathers reconcile with their daughters.

== Cast ==
- Anna Q. Nilsson as Anna Hedder
- Maurine Powers as Madeline Wallace
- Julia Swayne Gordon as Mrs. Wallace
- Corinne Barker as Ethel, a gold digger
- Katherine Perry as Edith, a gold digger
- Kate Blancke as Mrs. Hedder
- Claude King as Mr. Wallace
- Coit Albertson as Mr. Reynolds
- George Lessey as Mr. Hedder
- John B. O'Brien as Joseph
- Dan Mason as Dodo
- Arthur Gordini as Mr. Jackson

== Box office ==
According to Warner Bros records the film earned $410,000 domestically and $40,000 in foreign.

== Preservation status ==
This film is now lost. Warner Bros. records of the film's negative have a notation, "Junked 12/27/48" (i.e., December 27, 1948). Warner Bros. destroyed many of its negatives in the late 1940s and 1950s due to nitrate film pre-1933 decomposition. No copies of Why Girls Leave Home are known to exist.
