= Becky Sharp =

Character in Thackeray's Vanity Fair

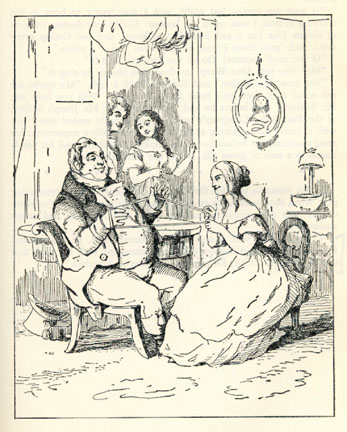
- Illustration by Thackeray to Chapter 4 of Vanity Fair: Becky Sharp is flirting with Mr Joseph Sedley.
- First appearance: Vanity Fair; 1847
- Created by: William Makepeace Thackeray
- Based on: Several women, including Jeanne de Valois-Saint-Rémy, Madame du Barry, Mary Anne Clarke and Harriette Wilson
- Portrayed by: Minnie Maddern Fiske; Mabel Ballin; Myrna Loy; Miriam Hopkins; Reese Witherspoon; Susan Hampshire; Eve Matheson; Natasha Little; Olivia Cooke

In-universe information
- Full name: Rebecca Sharp
- Gender: Female
- Occupation: Demimondaine
- Spouse: Rawdon Crawley
- Religion: Church of England
- Nationality: British

Rebecca "Becky" Sharp, later describing herself as Rebecca, Lady Crawley, is the main protagonist of William Makepeace Thackeray's 1847–48 novel (Note: The novel was first published in 12 separate parts over the course of the year.) Vanity Fair. She is presented as a cynical social climber who uses her charms to fascinate and seduce upper-class men. This is in contrast with the clinging, dependent Amelia Sedley, her friend from school. Becky then uses Amelia as a stepping stone to gain social position. Sharp functions as a picara—a picaresque heroine—by being a social outsider who is able to expose the manners of the gentry to ridicule.

The book—and Sharp's career—begins in a traditional manner of Victorian fiction, that of a young orphan (Sharp) with no source of income who has to make her own way in the world. Thackeray twisted the Victorian tradition, however, and quickly turned her into a young woman who knew what she wanted from life—fine clothes, money and a social position—and knew how to get them. The route was to be by marriage, and the novel follows Sharp's efforts at snaring a wealthy, but simple, husband, and being outdone by fate in her attempt. Eventually, she achieves her aims, but her husband catches her with a member of the aristocracy. Finding herself in Brussels during the Waterloo campaign, as the mistress of a British general, she in no way shares in the alarm felt by other Britons; to the contrary, she soberly makes a contingency plan—should the French win, she would strive to attach herself to one of Napoleon's marshals.

It is probable that Thackeray based the Becky Sharp character on real women. A number of historical figures have been proposed, and it is generally considered that Sharp is a composite of them. Sharp has been portrayed on stage and in films and television many times, and has been the subject of much scholarly debate on issues ranging from 19th-century social history, Victorian fashions, female psychology and gendered fiction.

== Context ==
Rebecca Sharp—generally known as Becky—is the main character in Thackeray's satirical novel, Vanity Fair: A Novel without a Hero, which was published incrementally between 1847 and 1848. Thackeray wished to counter the prevailing belief in society that it was impossible for women to create a fashionable self-image. (Note: Amy Montz has commented how, in Victorian England, "fashion was deemed dangerous because it was both artistic and sexually aware" and, to men, hinted at "secret initiations and rites".)

Set in high regency society at the time of the Waterloo campaign—in which three of the main male characters go to fight—the book is a "vast satirical panorama of materialist society" and an early work of the realist school. A comedic and semi-historical novel, Vanity Fair brought its author immediate renown on its 1847 publication.

According to 19th-century literary norms, the book's heroine should have been the upper-class Amelia Sedley; Thackeray, though, ensures that she is outshone by the lower-class Becky Sharp throughout. Sedley is a "dull and colourless foil"; she has all the positive traits that Sharp lacks, yet these bring her none of the benefits that Sharp experiences. Structurally, Amelia and Becky are joint-main characters, but as John P. Frazee points out, readers instinctively identify the latter as the sole protagonist due to her energy and forcefulness, while Amelia's colourlessness pushes her into the background.

Sharp is shown to be continually on the lookout for a wealthy but simple husband who will indulge her while turning a blind eye to her associations. The book traces hers and Amelia's respective paths in life, from the finishing school where they first meet, through their marriages, to their respective middle age.

Thackery "highlights the double bind in Victorian England regarding fashionable women's clothing: to be fashionable, one must be aware of the fashions and the ideas they convey, but to be a good Englishwoman, one must pretend to be ignorant of the artificiality of fashion and persuade others of one's ignorance."

— Amy Montz

=== Synopsis ===
The story is framed as a puppet show taking place at an 1814 London fair and is narrated by a highly unreliable master of ceremonies who repeats gossip at second or third hand. Vanity Fair tells the story of Rebecca ("Becky") Sharp, the orphaned daughter of an English art teacher and a French dancer. She is a strong-willed, cunning, and moneyless young woman determined to make her way in society. After leaving school, Becky stays with Amelia ("Emmy") Sedley, the good-natured and ingenuous daughter of a wealthy London family.

At Amelia's house, Becky meets the dashing and self-obsessed Captain George Osborne—actually engaged to Amelia—and Amelia's brother Joseph ("Jos") Sedley, a clumsy and vainglorious but rich civil servant home from the East India Company. Hoping to marry Sedley, the richest young man she has met, Becky entices him, but she fails. Osborne's friend, Captain William Dobbin, loves Amelia, but, putting her happiness first, does not attempt to compete with Osborne. Sharp goes into service with the crude and profligate baronet Sir Pitt Crawley, as governess to his daughters; she soon gains his favour. Sir Pitt's wife dies and he proposes to Becky. By then, though, she has married his son, Rawdon, which she soon regrets.

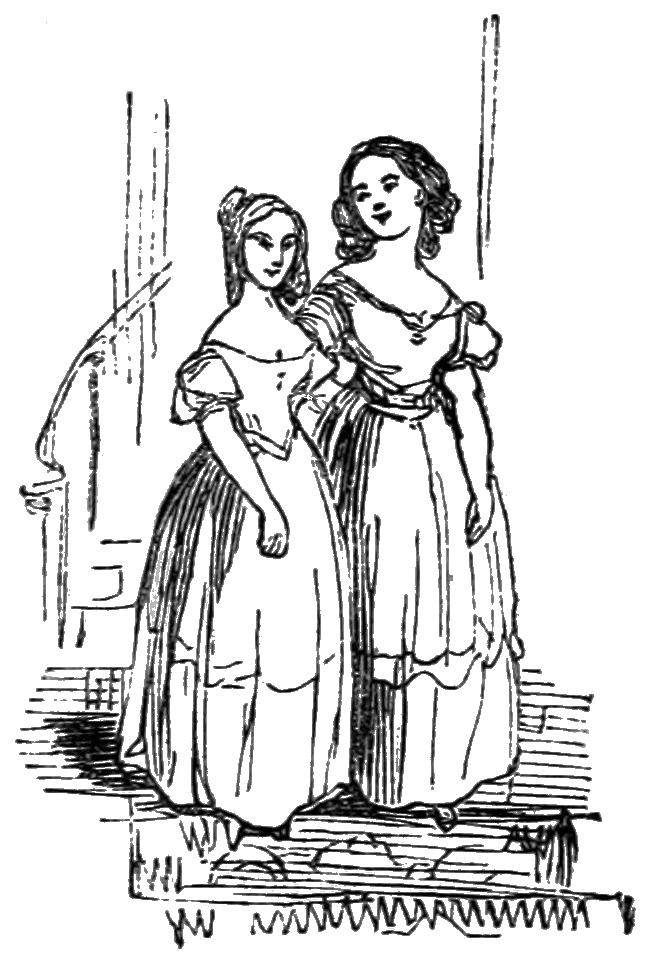
Thackeray's illustration of Becky and Emmy as girls

News arrives that Napoleon has escaped from Elba, and the stock market crashes, bankrupting Amelia's father. George's rich father forbids George to marry Amelia, because she is now poor. Dobbin persuades George to marry Amelia; George is disinherited. George, Dobbin and Rawdon are despatched to Brussels for the campaign. Osborne, tiring of Amelia, grows attracted to Becky.

At the Duchess of Richmond's ball in Brussels, Becky embarrasses Amelia by making snide remarks about the quality of the latter's frock; meanwhile, the army receives marching orders to Waterloo. The battle can be heard from Brussels, but Becky is indifferent to the result, making plans for whoever wins (for example, if Napoleon wins, she decides, she intends to become the mistress of one of his marshals). Osborne is killed, while Dobbin and Rawdon survive. Amelia lives in genteel poverty caring for their son.

Becky also has a son, to whom she is cold and distant, being far more interested in first Paris and then London society where she meets the wealthy Marquis of Steyne, by whom she is eventually presented at court to the Prince Regent, George IV. She charms Steyne at a game of "acting charades" where she plays the roles of Clytemnestra and Philomela. This point is the peak of Becky's social success, but Rawdon is arrested for debt, possibly at Becky's connivance. Steyne had given Becky money, jewels, and other gifts, but she makes no effort to free her husband.

When Rawdon is released, he finds Becky entertaining Steyne, whom Rawdon beats up, assuming the two to be having an affair. Steyne is indignant, having assumed the £1,000 he had just given Becky was part of an arrangement with her husband. Rawdon finds Becky's hidden bank records and leaves her, expecting Steyne to challenge him to a duel. Instead, Steyne arranges for Rawdon to be made Governor of Coventry Island, a pest-ridden location. Becky, having lost both husband and credibility, leaves England and wanders the continent, leaving her son in care.

Amelia, Jos, George and Dobbin go to the fictional Pumpernickel (based on Weimar, Germany), where they find Becky destitute. She lives among card sharps and con artists, drinking heavily and gambling. Becky enchants Jos Sedley all over again, and Amelia is persuaded to let Becky join them. Becky decides that Amelia should marry Dobbin, notwithstanding that Dobbin is Becky's nemesis, the only person to ever see through her before it is too late. Amelia and Dobbin return to England, while Becky and Jos stay in France. Jos dies in suspicious circumstances—likely poisoned—shortly after signing much of his wealth to Becky, giving her an income. She returns to England and lives as a demi-mondaine. Her former associates refuse to have anything to do with her.

== Character ==
For much of the book, owing to her lower-class origins, Sharp is not treated as a social equal to her associates, who are at least middle if not upper class. She is "notoriously immoral"—indeed, according to one commentator, she is the "embodiment of moral transgression"—with a "ruthless determination ... but unfailing good temper". Her energy repeatedly creates a "whirlwind" around her.

Sharp "manages to cheat, steal and lie without getting caught by the agents of social, moral and economic order who pursue her", which she does by creating for herself a new set of circumstances each time. This makes her "dangerous", in contemporary eyes, says Montz, and Sharp plays many such discrete roles throughout the book. However, each time she reinvents herself in order to overcome the next adversity, her previous reputation always catches up with her. Jennifer Hedgecock has commented that:

Becky's reputation inevitably catches up to her in each new setting and circle of aristocratic friends, yet her sense of humour and carefree attitude allow her to proceed with new plans. Becky, in fact, is the only high-spirited character in Vanity Fair, creating her own rules and showing that culture's harsh moral invectives can be frivolous and ineffective when rumours about her character fail to discourage Becky from hatching new schemes to marry gullible men for economic security and respectability.

=== Origins, appearance and personality ===
Born in Soho, Becky Sharp is the daughter of an impoverished English artist and a French "opera girl"—possibly a prostitute—and is thus half-French herself. To the English in the novel, her English ancestry is invisible; to them, she is wholly a Frenchwoman. She appears to have loved her father: Thackeray tells how, as a girl, she would sit with him "and [hear] the talk of many of his wild companions—often but ill-suited for a girl to hear", and when he dies Sharp misses both his companionship and the freedom that she had living with him.

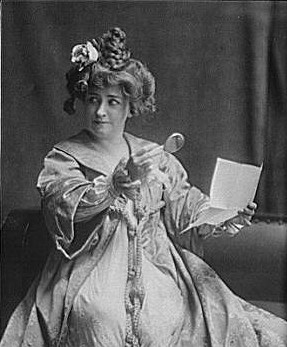
Photograph of Minnie Maddern Fiske as Becky Sharp, c. 1910

Sharp is a "flamboyant coquette" with bright green eyes. She is waif-like and attractive although not necessarily beautiful. A picara, she has talents for, and enjoyment of, acting, and is an excellent mimic. She has been described as "ever-adaptable" with a will to live and a vitality. However, she is also a duplicitous trickster,—"an outlaw, female insubordination personified", says Marion Meade—with an aggressive streak in her, who, however, never loses her femininity. She also has, says the Narrator, "wit, cleverness and flippancy", and a gift for "fun and mimicry".

Sharp is, says Harold Bloom, "famously a bad woman, selfish and endlessly designing, rarely bothered by a concern for truth, morals, or the good of the community." E. M. Forster describes Sharp as being "on the make"; for example, when she first sees Amelia's brother Jos, who is a revenue collector for the East India Company in Calcutta, she immediately asks Amelia whether he is very rich, because, "they say all Indian Nabobs are enormously rich". (Note: Thackeray had himself been born in Calcutta. Later, he suggests that Jo Sedley's income is around £4,800 annually: "hardly the 'enormity' that the British public, including Becky Sharp, had come to associate with the nabob".)

She is obsessed by money; unlike Amelia, who thinks that £2,000 (equivalent to £153,966 in 2025) will last her a lifetime, Sharp thinks that nothing less than £5,000 (equivalent to £384,915 in 2025) a year would be sufficient. Sharp's selfishness is even more highlighted when her husband is preparing to leave on the Waterloo campaign; she is more concerned that he has protected her income in case he is killed than over the risk to his life. Her subsequent attempt at appearing sorrowful at his departure is unrealistic to both her husband and the reader. The only time she cries for real is when she learns she could have married Sir Pitt Crawley, rather than, as she did, his son, whose fortunes were far less prosperous. "Her financial gains are always achieved through the exploitation of the affections of others", wrote Ulrich Knoepflmacher; Sharp understood, very early on, that sentiment is a profitable commodity and one to be used and disposed of when circumstances demanded it.

Sharp knows what an English lady should look like, and her impersonation is impeccable: "dressed in white, with bare shoulders as white as snow—the picture of youth, unprotected innocence and humble virgin simplicity". She understands the power that a fashionable appearance brings; "and revels in it", says Montz; thus she deliberately stages tableaux and parlour games in order to take centre stage, and as an excuse to dress even more flamboyantly. Her English companions consider her obsession with fashionable clothes the product of her French blood. Clothes, though, for Sharp, are an essential tool; they enable her to blend in with her upper-class associates. Sharp's "desire for fashion and worldliness" is in tune with the snobbish affectations—which she emulates—and hypocrisies of English society, which she identifies immediately. She is, however, sufficiently socially adaptable as to be able to blend in with the Bohemians she later meets in Germany.

== Career ==
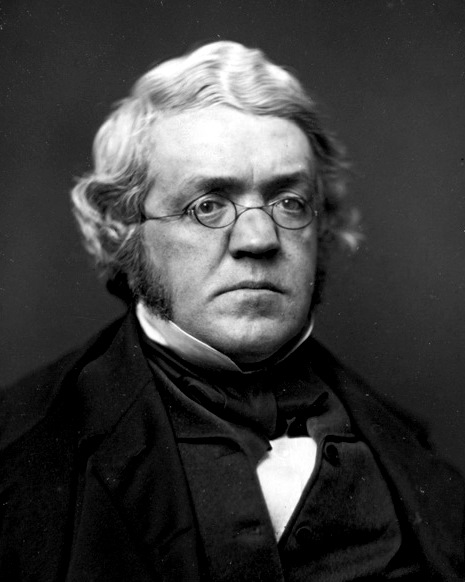
Daguerreotype photograph of William Makepeace Thackeray, author of Vanity Fair by Jesse Harrison Whitehurst

Educated at Miss Pinkerton's Academy, Sharp was an orphan. With no parents to guide her, either towards a good marriage or a career, she set out on her own to take what she could get from life. Her opening scene has her leaving the academy in a coach and throwing her copy of Johnson's Dictionary—given her by Miss Pinkerton—out of the window as she goes. As a penniless young lady of marriageable age alone in the world, hers is a traditional Burneyean entrance to the adult world. She starts on her career with the degenerate English gentry, and moves in with Sir Pitt Crawley as governess to his daughters. Sharp is dissatisfied, seeing herself as capable of far greater things: "in her imagination ... the princess de jure is only the governess de facto". She ends up in a more equal relationship with Crawley, who was described by Roger B. Henkle as "rascally, wenching, brawling ... drinks to all hours with Horrocks the Butler and smells of the stables".

She makes herself indispensable to the soon-to-be-widowed Sir Pitt as his amanuensis, by doing his accounts and other paperwork. Partly due to this reliance on her, he proposes marriage after his second wife dies. She soon, however, realises the limitations of Crawley's position, and moves out when invited to London by Crawley's rich half-sister. (Note: Sharp describes Crawley caustically in a letter to Amelia: "Sir Pitt is not what we silly girls, when we used to read Cecilia at Chiswick, imagined a baronet must have been. Anything, indeed, less like Lord Orville cannot be imagined. Fancy an old, stumpy, short, vulgar, and very dirty man, in old clothes and shabby old gaiters, who smokes a horrid pipe, and cooks his own horrid supper in a saucepan. He speaks with a country accent, and swore a great deal at the old charwoman.")

She successfully insinuates herself into the British ruling class with almost nobody noticing. When she first meets Mr Sedley, she tells him her story, of her penniless orphanhood and he gives her gifts; the only character who ever sees through her now well-to-do English facade is Dobbin, who says to himself, "what a humbug that woman is!" Sharp's debut is at the Duchess of Richmond's ball, held on 15 June 1815 in Brussels, which celebrates the Duke of Wellington's army on the eve of the Battle of Quatre Bras against the exiled Napoleon who has returned to France and raised an army. However, she had no means of transport to the ball, and eventually only manages to travel by simpering to the owner of the only carriage available and flattering him over "the courage he does not possess". The ball is a perfect opportunity for Sharp to dress up in her finest, offset against the glamour of a military campaign and the presence of an entire officer corp. Compared to Amelia Sedley—whose own appearance there is described as being an abject failure—Sharp's "debut was, on the contrary, very brilliant. She arrived very late. Her face was radiant; her dress perfection". In Brussels, everyone is panicking due to the proximity of Napoleon's army and the unexpected arrival of the French King, Louis XVIII into Brussels exile, yet Sharp's main interest is in humiliating Amelia at the ball over her—in Sharp's eyes—poor quality gown.

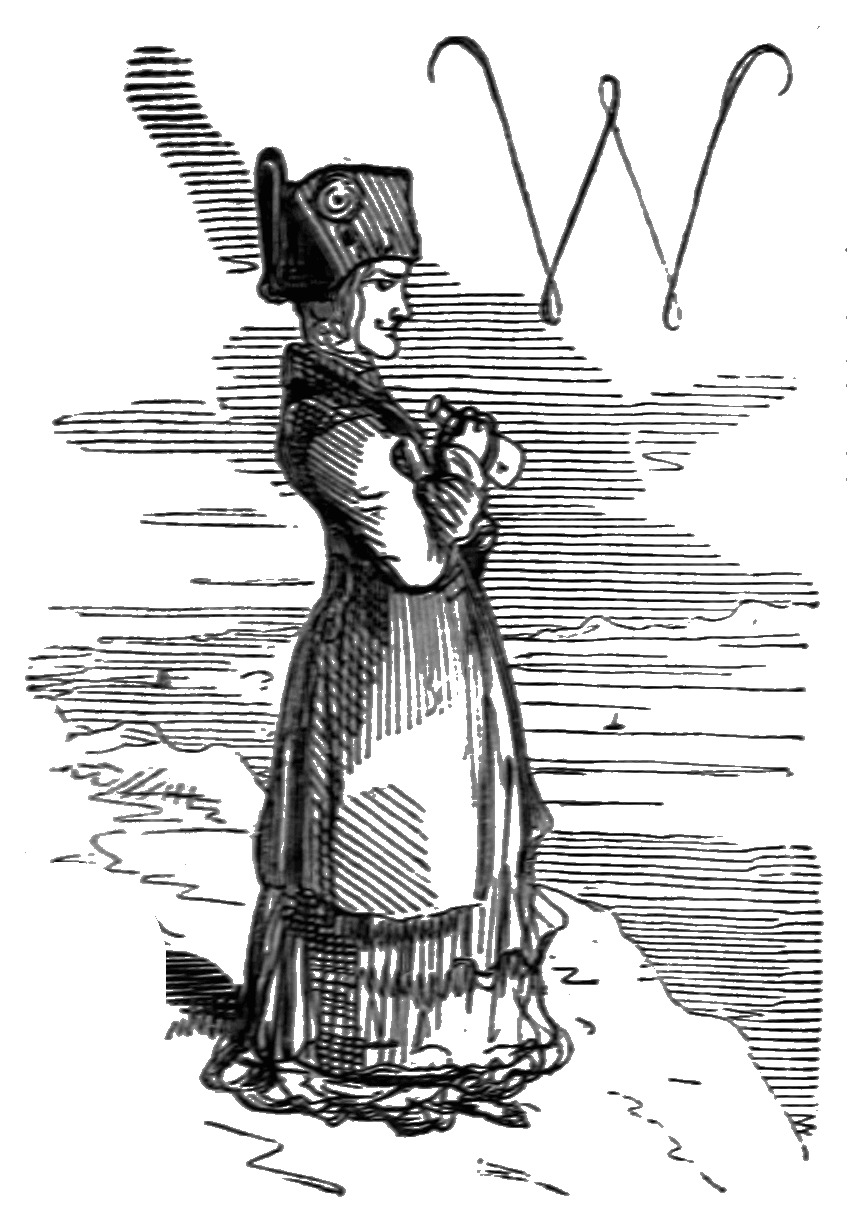
Becky as Napoleon, after various portraits both on Elba and Saint Helena

Soon after, Jos wants to propose to Sharp, but he loses his nerve and subsequently disappears —escaping back to Calcutta —and by the time he eventually does propose, comments Knoepflmacher, "both Becky Sharp and our attitude toward her have moved on". Meanwhile, for Sharp, "he has become her last straw, not her first". Rawdon and Sharp have wed and have a son, also named Rawdon, but his role in her life is more in the manner of being a prop for Sharp to demonstrate her marital bliss. She makes her sitting room a salon—with "ice and coffee ... the best there is in London—where she can be surrounded by admirers, among whom she ranks men of a "small but elite crowd". It is no surprise, suggests Frazee, that Sharp eventually meets the King—who had been regent, now George IV— and in his "high presence Mrs Rawdon passed her examination, and as it were, took her degree in reputation" from him: the King, suggests Thackeray, had created the very conditions which allowed Sharp to flourish. (Note: During his tenure as prince regent, says Robert Southey, a contemporary, "the squalor that existed beneath the glamour and gloss of Regency society provided sharp contrast to the Prince Regent's social circle. Poverty was addressed only marginally. The formation of the Regency after the retirement of George III saw the end of a more pious and reserved society, and gave birth of a more frivolous, ostentatious one. This change was influenced by the Regent himself, who was kept entirely removed from the machinations of politics and military exploits. This did nothing to channel his energies in a more positive direction, thereby leaving him with the pursuit of pleasure as his only outlet, as well as his sole form of rebellion against what he saw as disapproval and censure in the form of his father.")

Sharp's marriage to Rawdon Crawley is a major step up the social ladder, although, comments Bloom, this "ladder was a magic one and could withdraw itself at will". When her husband is arrested and held for a £100 debt, she writes to him from bed, insisting that she is doing everything in her power to release her "pauvre prisonnier". When he finally returns, finding her with Lord Steyne, he complains that she has not left him even £100 to take with him. Sharp was not sleeping with Steyne; rather, she reckoned that she needed what she calls a "moral sheepdog", and that that was to be Steyne. Rawdon was mistaken: she was further ingratiating herself with Steyne as a stepping-stone to reaching the pinnacle of English society.

Sharp finishes her days self-styling herself the Lady Crawley, a demi-mondaine living in penury in Curzon Street. (Note: This is an example, says Rosemarie Bodenheimer, of how the Victorian novelist used London locations to indicate the class status of their characters. Their middle-class readership would recognize from her Curzon Street address that her fortunes were on the wane; meanwhile, the fact that Miss Crawley has a house in Park Lane indicates her affluence, while the Sedleys—now in economic decline—have to move first to the middle-class Russell Square and then, eventually to suburban Fulham ("entirely off the social map", comments Bodenheimer).) Lisa Jadwin has described the book as ending "on a note of malignant irresolution". Sharp's fate is, to some degree ambiguous, and it is possible that Thackeray pastiches the classic Victorian novel's denouement in which the heroine makes a "death-in-life renunciation of worldly pleasures"—or the guise of one. Ulrich Knoepflmacher summarised Becky's experience:

All sorts of changes have intervened. Becky has been married and unmarried; she has risen above the Sedley's social scale only to fall beneath Jos again...She has seen King George, been Lord Steyne's friend, lost Rawdon, left her son, gone to Paris, and lived in a Bohemian garret, accosted by two German students.

— Ulrich Knoepflmacher

=== Love life ===
Amelia Sedley's husband, George Osborne, wants to seduce Sharp: he too fails to see through Sharp's projected image, "blinded by Becky's constructed self". Sharp has sexual adventures, but Thackeray never makes the connection between Sharp's sexual relationships and rise in social status explicit.

For Becky Sharp, sexuality and femininity are primarily tools with which to improve her social and financial position in both the short- and long-term. She is unmotivated, says Claudia Nelson, "by either heart or libido". Sharp herself comments, early in the book that "she never had been a girl ... she had been a woman since she was eight years old." Any capacity for love she does possess is narcissistic, and similarly, she puts her financial and social advancement before motherhood.

== Reception ==
=== Critical ===
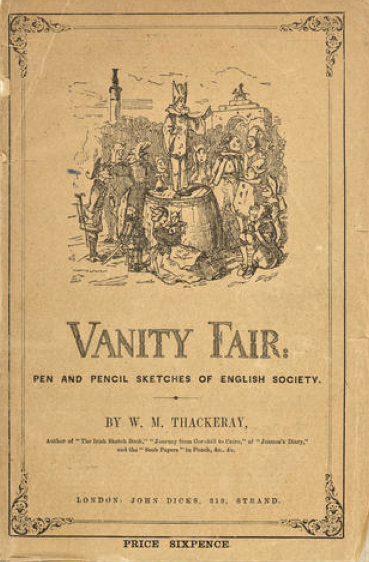
Early edition of Vanity Fair, c. 1850s

Mid-Victorian literature was still somewhat orientated towards "young ladies' literature" where the readership was morally sensitive. Thackeray took a degree of risk in presenting a character such as Sharp, says Michael Schmidt, but he remained within boundaries, and whilst he was satirical, he broke no taboos. Sharp, then, was a new phenomenon in Victorian fiction, which until Vanity Fair knew only of insipid heroines bound by convention or Smollett-esque grotesques. Amelia herself was one of the former, but Sharp was an original creation. Sharp has been called a "love to hate her and hate to love her" character, and this was radically different from previous representations of young women in literature. Thackeray has been described as "radical" in making his heroine(s) not only female, but also one of them conventionally wicked in character yet sympathetic to the audience.

Sharp's way of intruding her life into that of others has led to comparisons by one scholar to other Victorian literary characters. Both Joseph Conrad's Mr Vladmir in The Secret Agent, and in a comic rather than serious setting, Trollope's Mr Slope in Barchester Towers, play similar roles. In a modern sense what made her dangerous to contemporary eyes was her ambition; women did not, in nineteenth-century England, climb the social ladder—at least, not in an obvious manner.

That Sharp survives, and at times, thrives, despite her moral ambiguity indicates that Thackeray believed society was no longer able to cure wrongdoing. Sharp was, according to Hughes, "a measure of how debased society had come". Sharp's machinations can only work within the world of Vanity Fair—and Victorian society more broadly—because vanity and artificiality make it susceptible to her. Another plot device favoured by Victorian writers was that of children playing adult roles in society, and vice versa, (Note: Other examples are Weena, a woman who appears as "doll-like" as a girl, from H. G. Wells' The Time Machine; in F. T. Anstey's novel Vice Versa, a boy and his father accidentally swap bodies; and the eponymous heroine of George Knight's Sapphira of the Stage in 1896.) and Sharp's comment that she had not been a girl since she was eight years' old has led to her being identified as one such "child-woman".

Vanity Fair was the first major novel to have a governess, whether a heroine or an anti-heroine, as its main character. They had always been in the background, but Sharp was the first time a governess' ambitions to break out of her limited society were placed centre stage. Sharp's orphan status reflected a common theme in writers of the period; as Kathryn Hughes notes, for Emily Morton from Amy Herbert, Charlotte Brontë's eponymous character from Jane Eyre, and Jane Fairfax from Emma, their positions as orphans are central to the books' subsequent plots. Similarly central are their roles as governesses, but whereas for Emily and the two Janes it symbolised class distinctions and the gap between the governess and her employers, for Sharp it was a means of role reversal.

Unlike Jane Eyre, Sharp is aware of the ways of the world from a very young age. Henkle suggests that Sharp, with her carefree and radical approach to social barriers, is symbolic of the change that Victorian society was undergoing in the mid-19th century. There was greater fluidity than ever before as a result of the massively increased wealth among the middle class as a result of the Industrial Revolution, and this fluidity allowed the courtesan to flourish in the Regency era. (Note: Courtesans during the Regency, says Frazee, "could attain a social position rivalling women more legitimately associated with the great men of the period. She might have a box at the opera, whence young men of position would make pilgrimages from the universities to receive an introduction", while R. J. White said that these boxes were the equivalent of "shop windows for their charms". Courtesans held annual balls known as "the Ball of the Fashionable Impures" or the "Cyprians' Ball" in the Argyll Rooms. Frazee suggests that, to the mid-Victorian reader, "the Regency courtesan must have seemed ... a characteristic embodiment of a radically different world".)

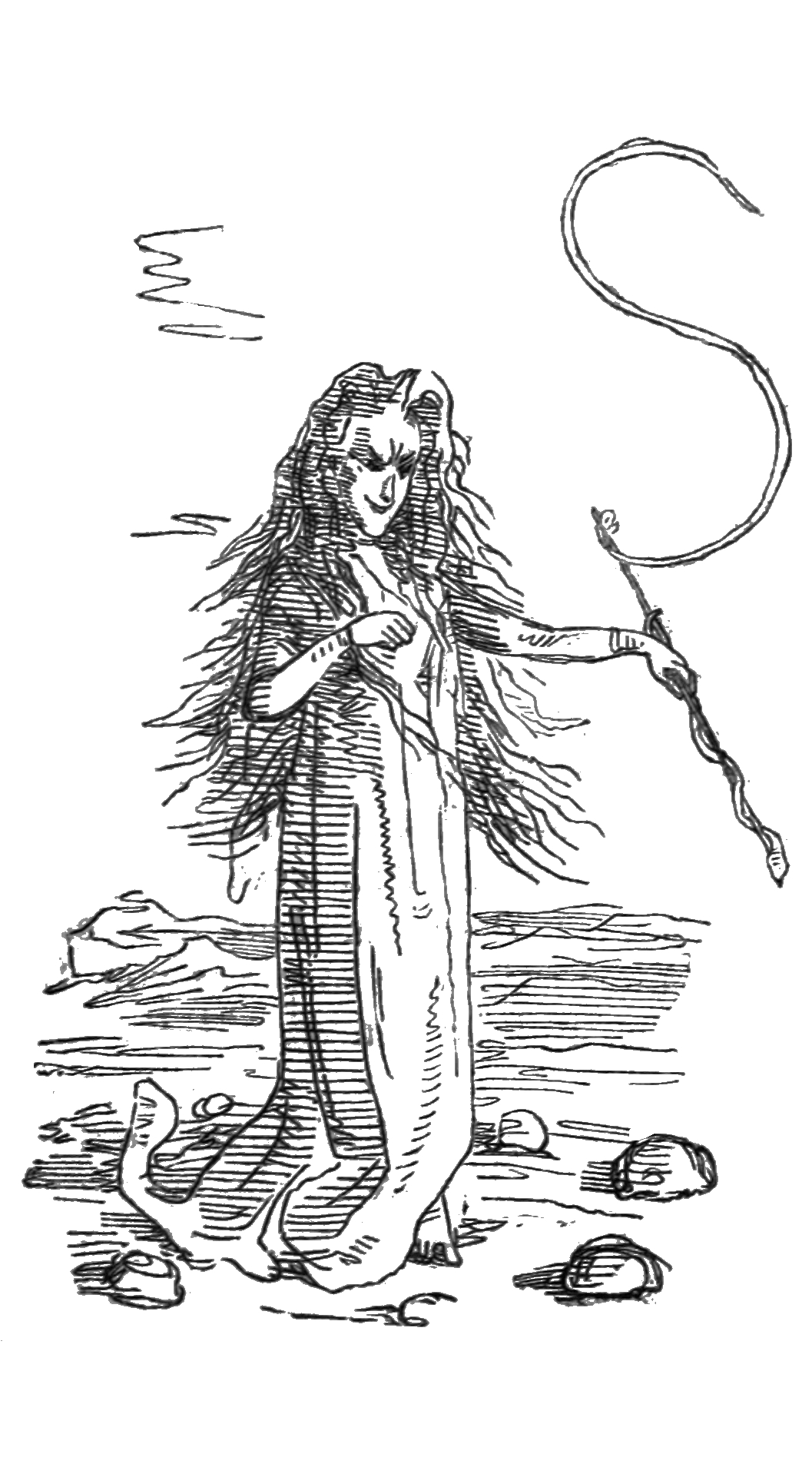
Thackeray's illustration of Becky as Circe

The events portrayed in Vanity Fair are described by narration, but the narrator is uninterested in Sharp's thoughts, only her actions. For example, when she goes to bed wondering whether Jos will call on her the next morning, the very next sentence informs us that he did. What Sharp thought, in the meantime, is deemed irrelevant to the reader's enjoyment and understanding of the novel. However, although the Narrator repeatedly draws attention to Sharp's immoralities, he does recognise that her behaviour reflects the hypocrisy of the world—"that has, perhaps, no particular objection to vice, but an insuperable repugnance to hearing vice called by its proper name". Writes Montz, "Becky Sharp is artificial because she chooses to be so: the reader never sees any sign that there is a real Becky beneath the facade of the performer, the flirtatious lover, the good wife, the social climber, the capricious friend". Such women as Sharp, writes Frazee, contributed "nearly as much to the pungent flavour of the period as did the regent himself".

Margaret Atwood has praised Sharp as a character, writing how she "makes no pretensions to goodness. She is wicked, she enjoys being wicked, and she does it out of vanity and her own profit, tricking and deluding English society in the process". She compares Sharp to Edith Wharton's Undine Spragg in The Custom of the Country: both live on their wits "and use men as ambulatory bank accounts", although the latter did not have the spirit or sense of humour that Sharp is portrayed with. More personally, suggests Henkle, to Thackeray himself she represented the power of the artist and the writer, in how she overcomes obstacles to achieve her aims. Her entire career, says F. M. Salter, is "one supreme irony", and Patricia Marks suggests that Becky, although a rounded character, remains "nothing without her finery", and compared with her, the other characters appear "tattered".

Commentator Heather L. Braun describes Becky at the end of the novel as akin to a Rhine maiden, a Clytemnestra: "she has become 'an apparition' that 'glides' rather than walks into a room; her hair 'floats' around her pale face, framing a 'ghastly expression' that elicits fear and trembling in those who look upon her". Braun compares Becky's wanderings around Europe to the toils of Circe.

=== Popular ===
Thackeray personally disapproved of Sharp's behaviour, and contemporaries would have understood how, from Sharp's actions, she was a bad woman. However, their judgement would be based as much on actual expectations of real social morality as on what they read in Thackeray's pages. More, that they thought she was bad need not have meant they were necessarily unsympathetic. Thackeray himself compared Sharp's career as "resembling the slitherings of a mermaid", and Bloom says that she is enough of a character to make her fundamentally likeable, to the extent that "any reader who does not like Becky is almost certainly not very likeable herself or himself". Poet Dorothy Parker—herself orphaned at age nine—"strongly identified" with Sharp, and effectively treated her as a role model. Meade, in her biography of Parker, says Sharp became Parker's alter ego, and that it was from her that Parker learnt "the rules of the game".

To E. M. Dadlez, Sharp is a character to be admired, particularly for her intelligence—which is more acute than any of the other characters (aside from Dobbin, who sees through her)—her overcoming a difficult childhood, and ultimately "her talent to survive disasters". She notes that Sharp looks better when the general unprincipled foolishness of the rest of the cast is taken into account.

Thackeray's character made a strong impression on contemporaries. Elizabeth Browning's protagonist of Aurora Leigh (1856), Marian Erle, is a similar character to Sharp. In 1872 The Spectator reviewed Anthony Trollope's The Eustace Diamonds and made an unfavourable comparison between Trollope's main female lead, Lady Eustace, and Becky Sharp. The reviewer wrote how "we had supposed that in Lady Eustace we were to have Mr Trollope's equivalent for Thackeray's Becky Sharp, but we hardly think that we have got it; or if we have, Mr Trollope's equivalent for Thackeray's Becky Sharp is but a poor one." Henry James called Sharp an "epic governess" of literature. In 1848, writing in The Spectator, R. S. Rintoul wrote

Rebecca Crawley (formerly Sharp) is the principal person in the book, with whom nearly all the others are connected: and a very wonderfully drawn picture she is, as a woman scheming for self-advancement, without either heart or principle, yet with a constitutional vivacity and a readiness to please, that saves her from the contempt or disgust she deserves. As a creation or character, we know not where Rebecca can be matched in prose fiction.

In the 21st century, Sharp's character has been used in diverse ways. For example, it has been the subject of a book on business ethics, and a work of fiction by Sarra Manning transposes her life and adventures onto a contemporary woman.

== Real-life models ==
Wilde "inquired what became of the governess, and she replied that, oddly enough, some years after the appearance of Vanity Fair she ran away with the nephew of the lady with whom she was living, and for a short time made a great splash in society, quite in Mrs. Rawdon Crawley's [Becky Sharp's] style, and entirely by Mrs. Rawdon Crawley's methods. Ultimately she came to grief, disappeared to the Continent, and used to be occasionally seen at Monte Carlo and other gambling places.

Oscar Wilde said that he asked a female friend of Thackeray's whether Sharp had any real-life basis. She said that although the character was strictly fictional, her general character had been suggested to Thackeray by a governess in Kensington Square, who was a lady's companion to a wealthy but irascible elderly woman. In an unpublished 1911 essay, novelist Charles Reade used the accepted image of Sharp to illustrate Madame du Barry's assertion that the most foolish woman can trick a man, by using against him the education that he has paid for. Says Reade, had she known of Thackeray's creation, du Barry would have asserted "the wisest of the sex is a Becky Sharp". It has in turn been suggested that du Barry was a direct model for Thackeray's Sharp, with both women being "careless beauties cursed with ambition beyond reason, who venture into activities beyond morals". Another possible model for Sharp from the same era suggested Andrew Lang, maybe Jeanne de Valois, notorious for her involvement in the affair of the Diamond Necklace. Like de Valois, Sharp had a childhood of financial hardship, and Sharp's later boast of how she was related to the French noble family of de Montmorency could have been based on de Valois' own claims to have French royal blood in her veins.

Gordon Ray suggested that the character of Sharp had no single source; rather, it was the combination of aspects of different women that Thackeray had observed and read about. Other possible models for the Sharp character have been suggested as Mary Anne Clarke and Harriette Wilson, two of the most well known English courtesans of the Regency era. Clarke was originally Mistress of the Regent's brother, the Duke of York, and in 1809 had been at the centre of a scandal in which she acknowledged selling officers' commissions with the duke's knowledge, who—being Commander-in-chief—subsequently resigned. Clarke attempted to publish her memoirs on the matter; they were suppressed, but she received a £10,000 payment and an annuity from the King. Harriette Wilson—described by Walter Scott as having "lived with half the gay world at hack and manger"—also published her memoirs. She too had profited from her liaisons with important society men, and had become mistress to the Earl of Craven at the age of 15; her memoirs went through over 30 editions in their year of publication. Says Frazee, "these two most celebrated courtesans of the Regency provided Thackeray with material which, when added to that he acquired from first-hand knowledge of women like Becky and from his reading of fiction" enabled him to create a realistic Regency courtesan in Sharp.

== Dramatic portrayals ==
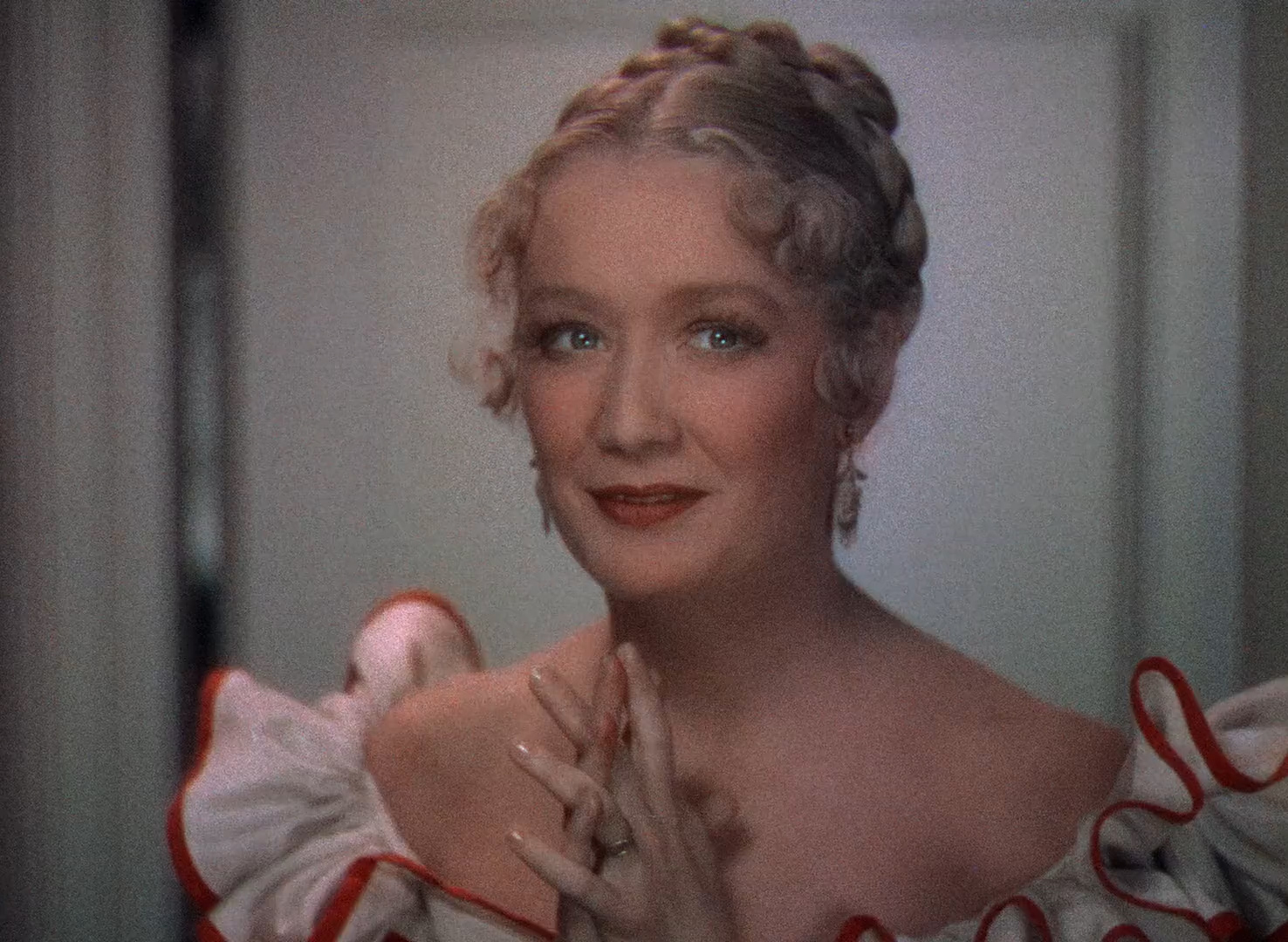
Miriam Hopkins portraying the character in the 1935 film Becky Sharp

In 1899, Langdon Mitchell's production of Vanity Fair toured the United States with Minnie Maddern Fiske as Sharp, a role Fiske received critical praise for. The following year his production was plagiarised by Gertrude Coghlan's Delcher & Hennessy theatre company, with herself in the lead role, until Mitchell sued.

The first film version of Vanity Fair was released in 1915. This was a silent film directed by Charles Brabin and also starring Fiske in the main role. Another silent version, directed by Walter Courtney Rowden and starring Kyrie Bellew, was made and released in Britain seven years later. The following year saw another silent production released by Samuel Goldwyn; this was directed by Hugo Ballin and starred his wife, Mabel, as Sharp. The film is now considered lost.

The first spoken-word release was Chester M. Franklin's 1932 film of Vanity Fair, with Sharp played by Myrna Loy; her marriage scene was filmed in Boston's Louisburg Square, representing Russell Square in London. Three years later Miriam Hopkins played Sharp in Rouben Mamoulian's production, which was the first feature film to use three-strip Technicolor. Hopkins was nominated for an Academy Award for her portrayal. Reese Witherspoon played Sharp in Mira Nair's 2004 film based on the novel; Rotten Tomatoes criticized the film's version of the character, writing "A more likable Becky Sharp makes for a less interesting movie."

Vanity Fair has also been produced numerous times for television. It was first serialised by the BBC in 1956, and starred Joyce Redman. The second BBC version in 1967, starred Susan Hampshire. This was followed twenty years later, also by the BBC at the Pebble Mill Studios, with Eve Matheson as Sharp. Andrew Davies wrote the screenplay of a BBC television drama of Vanity Fair which was screened in 1998; Natasha Little played Becky Sharp. Little won the Best Actress in a Drama Series category in the following year's Biarritz International Television Festival as well as a BAFTA nomination for Best Actress in a Leading Role for her portrayal of Sharp. (Note: Natasha Little also went on to play the role of Lady Jane Crawley in Mira Nair's 2004 film.) Olivia Cooke played Sharp in a 2018 television series, screened on ITV over seven episodes.

The 2008 play Becky Shaw by Gina Gionfriddo references in its title Becky Sharp.

== Notes, references, sources ==
=== Bibliography ===
- AFI. "Vanity Fair (1915)". American Film Institute.
- Atwood, Margaret (2009). Curious Pursuits: Occasional Writing. London: Virago. ISBN 978-1-84408-150-9.
- Beckson, K. (1982). Aesthetes and Decadents of the 1890s: An Anthology of British Poetry and Prose. Chicago: Chicago Review Press. ISBN 978-1-61373-435-3.
- BBC (28 December 1956). "Vanity Fair: Episode 1". p. 44 – via BBC Genome Project.
- BFI. "Vanity Fair (1922)". British Film Institute.
- Bloom, Harold, ed. (2004). The Victorian Novel. New York: Infobase Publishing. ISBN 978-0-79107-678-1.
- Bloom, Harold. Introduction. In Bloom (2004), pp. 1–46.
- Bodenheimer, R. (2011). "London in the Victorian Novel". In Manley, L. (ed.). The Cambridge Companion to the Literature of London. Cambridge: Cambridge University Press. pp. 142–159. ISBN 978-0-52189-752-5.
- Booth, A (1993). Famous Last Words: Changes in Gender and Narrative Closure. Charlottesville: University of Virginia Press. ISBN 978-0-81391-437-4.
- Brantlinger, P. (1990). Rule of Darkness: British Literature and Imperialism, 1830-1914. Ithaca, New York: Cornell University Press. ISBN 978-0-80146-702-8.
- Braun, H. L. (2012). The Rise and Fall of the Femme Fatale in British Literature, 1790–1910. Plymouth: Fairleigh Dickinson. ISBN 978-1-61147-563-0.
- Brown, J. P. "Class and Money". In Bloom (2004), pp. 69–90.
- Cardwell, S. (2005). Andrew Davies. Manchester: Manchester University Press. ISBN 978-0-71906-492-0.
- Clark, B. H. (1941). America's Lost Plays: Monte Cristo, by C. Fechter. Princeton, New Jersey: Princeton University Press. OCLC 7043711.
- Cohn, D. (1978). Transparent Minds: Narrative Modes for Presenting Consciousness in Fiction. Princeton, New Jersey: Princeton University Press. ISBN 978-0-691-10156-9.
- Collins-Hughes, Laura (6 April 2026). "Funny vs. Likable? Funny Wins". The New York Times.
- Cunningham, Anne (10 September 2018). "Thackeray's bold Becky Sharp gets a thoroughly modern makeover". Irish Independent. OCLC 1035156580.
- Dadlez, E. M. (1997). What's Hecuba to Him?: Fictional Events and Actual Emotions. Philadelphia: Penn State Press. ISBN 978-0-271-03981-7.
- Elam, D. (1993). "White Narratology: Gender and Reference in Wilkie Collins's The Woman in White". In Davis, L. (ed.). Virginal Sexuality and Textuality in Victorian Literature. Albany, New York: SUNY Press. pp. 49 64. ISBN 978-0-79141-284-8.
- Day, B. (2004). Dorothy Parker in Her Own Words. Lanham, Maryland: Taylor Trade Publishing. ISBN 978-1-58979-071-1.
- de Monbron, F. (2015). "Introduction". In Langille É (ed.). Fougeret de Monbron, 'Margot la ravaudeuse'. Cambridge: MHRA. pp. 1 12. ISBN 978-1-78188-189-7.
- El-Rayess, M. (2014). Henry James and the Culture of Consumption. Cambridge: Cambridge University Press. ISBN 978-1-10703-905-6.
- Forster, E. M. (1927). Aspects of the Novel. London: Arnold, Eward & Co. OCLC 799138510.
- Frazee, J. P. (1998). "The Creation of Becky Sharp in Vanity Fair". Dickens Studies Annual. 27: 227–244. OCLC 490893253.
- Giddings, R.; Selby, K.; Wensley, C. (1990). Screening The Novel: The Theory And Practice Of Literary Dramatization. London: Macmillan. ISBN 978-1-34920-516-5.
- Goodman, P. S. (2003). The Garden Squares of Boston. Lebanon, New Hampshire: University Press of New England. ISBN 978-1-58465-298-4.
- Hedgecock, J. (2008). The Femme Fatale in Victorian Literature: The Danger and the Sexual Threat. Amherst, New York: Cambria Press. ISBN 978-1-60497-518-5.
- Heiler, L. (2010). "Against Censorship: Literature, TRansgression and Taboo from a Diachronic Perspective". In Horlacher, S.; Glomb, S.; Heiler, L. (eds.). Taboo and Transgression in British Literature from the Renaissance to the Present. New York: Palgrave Macmillan. pp. 49 74. ISBN 978-0-23010-599-7.
- Henkle, R. B. (1980). Comedy and Culture: England 1820-1900. Princeton, New Jersey: Princeton University Press. ISBN 978-1-40085-792-0.
- Hughes, K. (1993). The Victorian Governess. London: A&C Black. ISBN 978-1-85285-002-9.
- Kent, E. (2015). Corporate Character: Representing Imperial Power in British India, 1786-1901. Toronto: University of Toronto Press. ISBN 978-1-44261-702-5.
- Kirsner, S. (2008). Inventing the Movies: Hollywood's Epic Battle Between Innovation and the Status Quo, from Thomas Edison to Steve Jobs. New York: CinemaTech. ISBN 978-1-43820-999-9.
- Knoepflmacher, U. C. (1973). Laughter and Despair: Readings in Ten Novels of the Victorian Era (1st ppbk ed.). Berkeley: University of California Press. ISBN 978-0-52002-352-9.
- Lang, A. (1904). Historical Mysteries. London: Smith, Elder, & Co. OCLC 561760716.
- Marks, P. (1996). ""mon Pauvre Prisonnier": Becky Sharp and the Triumph of Napoleon". Studies in the Novel. 28: 76–92. OCLC 664601687.
- Meade, Marion (1988). Dorothy Parker: What Fresh Hell Is This?. London: Random House. ISBN 978-1-10146-219-5.
- Moler, K. L. (1972). "Evelina in Vanity Fair: Becky Sharp and Her Patrician Heroes". Nineteenth-Century Fiction. 27 (2): 171–181. doi:10.2307/2933051. JSTOR 2933051. OCLC 311095510.
- Montz, A. L. (2015). "William Makepeace Thackery's Fashionable Humbugs: Consuming National Distinctions of Dress in Vanity Fair". In Joslin, K.; Wardrop, D. (eds.). Crossings in Text and Textile. Lebanon, New Hampshire: University of New Hampshire Press. pp. 103–124. ISBN 978-1-61168-642-5.
- Moran, M. (2006). Victorian Literature and Culture. London: A&C Black. ISBN 978-1-44116-987-7.
- Moya, A. (2010). "The Politics of Re-presenting "Vanity Fair": Mira Nair's Becky Sharp / Las políticas de la re-presentación en La feria de las vanidades: Becky Sharp en la producción de Mira Nair". Atlantis. 32: 73–87. OCLC 5791861729.
- Neil, S. D. "London by Gaslight". In Bloom (2004), pp. 171–200.
- Nelson, C. (2012). Precocious Children and Childish Adults: Age Inversion in Victorian Literature. Baltimore, Maryland: JHU Press. ISBN 978-1-42140-534-6.
- Ousby, I. (1996). The Cambridge Paperback Guide to Literature in English. Cambridge: Cambridge University Press. ISBN 978-0-52143-627-4.
- PAD (2017). "Vanity Fair / Hugo Ballin [motion picture]". Library of Congress. Performing Arts Database. Archived from the original on 28 October 2018.
- Pettit, R. S. (2000). A Gendered Collision: Sentimentalism and Modernism in Dorothy Parker's Poetry and Fiction. Teaneck, New Jersey: Fairleigh Dickinson University Press. ISBN 978-0-83863-818-7.
- Reade, C. (2006). "Androgynism; or, Woman Playing at Man". In Bauer, H. (ed.). Women & Cross Dressing 1800-19. London: Routledge. pp. 1–44. ISBN 978-1-13435-109-1.
- Salter, F. M. (1971). The Art of Writing. Vancouver: Regent College Publishing. ISBN 978-1-57383-292-2.
- Saner, Emine (2 September 2018). "Vanity Fair review – this adaptation fizzes with all the energy of its social-climbing heroine". The Guardian. OCLC 302341888.
- Schmidt, M. (12 May 2014). The Novel: A Biography. Cambridge, MA: Harvard University Press. ISBN 978-0-67472-473-0.
- Scott, O. J. (1974). Robespierre: The Voice of Virtue (1st ed.). New York: Mason and Lipscomb. ISBN 978-1-41281-822-3.
- Slegers, R. (2018). Adam Smith's Moral Sentiments in Vanity Fair: Lessons in Business from Becky Sharp. Cham: Springer. ISBN 978-3-31998-730-9.
- Showalter, E. (1993). "Spragg: The Art of the Deal". In Bell, M. (ed.). The Cambridge Companion to Edith Wharton. Cambridge: Cambridge University Press. pp. 87–97. ISBN 978-0-52148-513-5.
- Siebenschuh, W. R. (1987). "Johnson's Lives and Modern Students". In Wheeler, D. (ed.). Domestick Privacies Samuel Johnson and the Art of Biography. Lexington, KY: University Press of Kentucky. pp. 133–151. ISBN 9780813116129.
- Smalley, D. (1969). Anthony Trollope: The Critical Heritage. London: Routledge. OCLC 710014131.
- Smith, E. A. (1999). George IV. New Haven: Yale University Press. ISBN 978-0-30008-802-1.
- Underwood, D. (2010). Journalism and the Novel: Truth and Fiction, 1700-2000. Cambridge: Cambridge University Press. ISBN 978-0-52118-754-1.
- "Vanity Fair (2004)". Rotten Tomatoes. Fandango Media.
- Wheatley, H. (2014). ""Marvellous, Awesome, True-to-life, Epoch-making, a New Dimension": Reconsidering the Early History of Colour Television in Britain". In Mee, L.; Walker, J. (eds.). Cinema, Television and History: New Approaches. Newcastle: Cambridge Scholars. pp. 142–163. ISBN 978-1-44386-887-7.
- White, R. J. (1963). Life in Regency England. London: B.T. Batsford. OCLC 930214577.
- Wicks, U. (1989). Picaresque Narrative, Picaresque Fictions: A Theory and Research Guide. London: Greenwood Press. ISBN 978-0-31324-934-1.
