= The Glorious Adventure =

The Glorious Adventure can refer to:

- The Glorious Adventure (1918 film), a 1918 silent American film
- The Glorious Adventure (1922 film), a 1922 silent British film
