= Loyal Heart =

- Directed by: Oswald Mitchell
- Written by: Ernest Lewis (novel); George A. Cooper; Oswald Mitchell
- Produced by: Louis H. Jackson; Oswald Mitchell
- Starring: Percy Marmont; Harry Welchman; Patricia Marmont
- Cinematography: Gerald Gibbs; Arthur Grant
- Edited by: Douglas Myers
- Music by: Percival Mackey
- Production company: British National Films
- Distributed by: Anglo-American Film Corporation
- Release date: 22 February 1946
- Running time: 80 minutes
- Country: United Kingdom
- Language: English

Loyal Heart is a 1946 British drama film directed by Oswald Mitchell and starring Percy Marmont, Harry Welchman and Patricia Marmont. It was written by Mitchell and George A. Cooper based on the 1934 novel Beth the Sheepdog by Ernest Lewis.

The film portrays rivalry in the sheep farming community.

== Plot ==
Cumberland farmer John Armstrong owns champion sheepdog Fleet. After a severe winter ruins his crops he asks local farmer Burton for a loan. When he cannot repay it, Burton demands he gives him Fleet, but Armstrong refuses. In revenge, Burton frames Armstrong for theft. With the help of his son and the local squire, Armstrong exposes Burton's evildoing.

== Cast ==
- Fleet the Wonder Dog as himself
- Percy Marmont as John Armstrong
- Harry Welchman as Sir Ian
- Patricia Marmont as Joan Stewart
- Philip Kay as Tommy
- Eleanor Hallam as Mary Armstrong
- Beckett Bould as Burton
- Valentine Dunn as Alice Burton
- Cameron Hall as Edwards
- Alexander Field as Blinkers
- James Knight as Police Sergeant
- Gerald Pring as doctor

== Production ==
It was made by the independent company British National Films as a supporting feature. Location filming took place in Cumberland during summer 1944 but it was a further year before the studio-shot scenes were completed. The film's sets were designed by the art director Wilfred Arnold.

== Release ==
The film was released on a double bill with the Hollywood costume film The Strange Woman (1946).

== Reception ==
The Monthly Film Bulletin wrote: "Melodrama, telling how Fleet, the wonder sheep-dog, after many adventures, managed to heal a long-standing feud between two Cumberland farmers. Despite the presence in the cast of those two experienced players, Percy Marmont and Harry Welchman, Fleet is far away the best actor, and shares with the scenery all the credit for making this unsophisticated film comparatively enjoyable."

Kine Weekly wrote: "Canine comedy melodrama, staged in picturesque Cumberland ... is straightforwardly told and the winning performance of "Fleet," the Wonder Dog, fine scenery and authentic detail are agreeable substitutes for subtlety and surprise. ... The picture has many delightful scenes of the wild Cumberland countryside, which give substantial backing to its artless melodrama. The sheepdog trials make fascinating and appropriate diversion, without being overdone. The camerawork is well up to standard. The main point of criticism is its length – it's a trifle on the long side – but this applies to the majority of British films these days. It's the curse of the quota!"

== Bibliography ==
- Chibnall, Steve & McFarlane, Brian. The British 'B' Film. Palgrave MacMillan, 2009.
