= Tiger Thompson =

1924 film

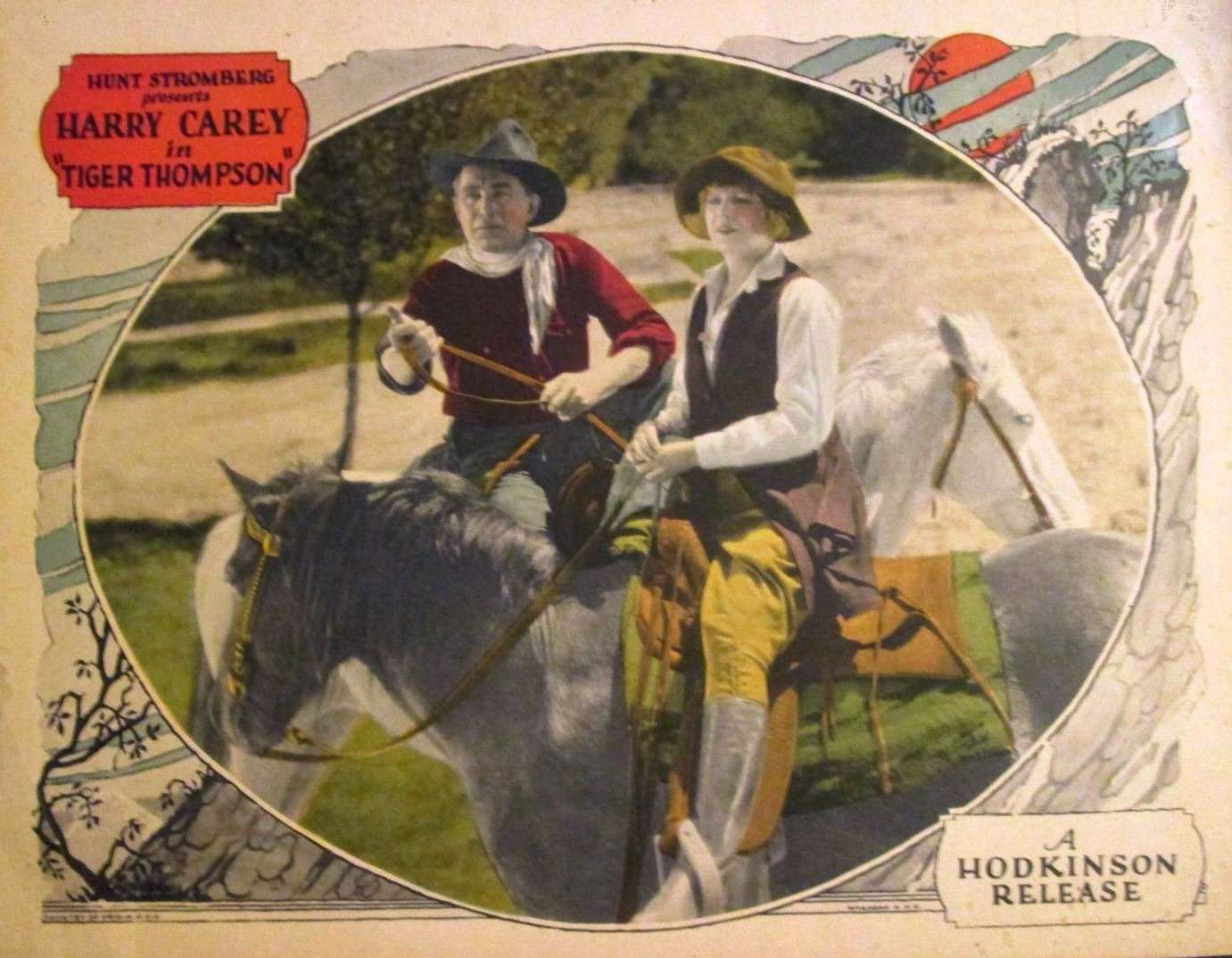
- Lobby card
- Directed by: B. Reeves Eason
- Written by: Buckleigh Fritz Oxford
- Starring: Harry Carey
- Cinematography: Henry Sharp
- Edited by: Harry Marker
- Production company: Hunt Stromberg Productions
- Distributed by: W. W. Hodkinson Corporation
- Release date: July 13, 1924
- Running time: 6 reels
- Country: United States
- Languages: Silent; English intertitles

Tiger Thompson is a lost 1924 American silent Western film directed by B. Reeves Eason featuring Harry Carey.

== Cast ==
- Harry Carey as "Tiger" Thompson
- Marguerite Clayton as Ethel Brannon
- John Webb Dillion as Jim Morley (credited as John Dillon)
- Jack Richardson as "Bull" Dorgan
- George Ring as Charlie Wong

== Preservation ==
With no holdings located in archives, Tiger Thompson is considered a lost film.

== See also ==
- Harry Carey filmography
