= The Shining Adventure =

1925 silent film

- Directed by: Hugo Ballin
- Written by: Laurence Trimble
- Based on: The Shining Adventure by Dana Burnet
- Starring: Percy Marmont; Mabel Ballin; Ben Alexander
- Cinematography: James Diamond
- Production company: Madeline Brandeis Productions
- Distributed by: Astor Pictures
- Release date: August 7, 1925
- Running time: 67 minutes
- Country: United States
- Language: Silent (English intertitles)

The Shining Adventure is a 1925 American silent drama film directed by Hugo Ballin and starring Percy Marmont, Mabel Ballin, and Ben Alexander.

== Plot ==
As described in a film magazine review, a philanthropic but not very practical woman is admired by a rugged doctor who in serving the poor finds in a tenement house the sister of the philanthropist. She is in poor mental and physical health and her baby son is not properly cared for. The doctor gives the child into the rich woman’s care and the mother disappears. The rich woman neglects the child, and finally it wanders to the neighborhood of its old home. The boy’s mother, who is now definitely demented, finds him, and loses him again, the last time by death. Then she reveals her identity to her sister. Conscience stricken, the rich woman promises to make amends.

== Cast ==
- Percy Marmont as Dr. Hugo McLean
- Mabel Ballin as Mary
- Ben Alexander as Benny
- Wayne Lamont as Franklin Tribbit
- Mary Jane Irving as Lamey
- Carmencita Johnson as Baby
- Toby Wing as Little Girl
- Miriam Battista as Little Girl

== Preservation ==
A complete print of The Shining Adventure exists at the UCLA Film & Television Archive in Los Angeles.
