= James Diamond (cinematographer) =

American cinematographer

- Born: 1894
- Died: October 17, 1936 (aged 41–42); Los Angeles, California, United States
- Occupation: Cinematographer
- Years active: 1921–1936 (film)

James Diamond (1894–1936) was an American cinematographer active during the silent and early sound eras. Much of his work during the 1930s was for lower-budget Poverty Row companies.

== Selected filmography ==
- The Journey's End (1921)
- Jane Eyre (1921)
- Other Women's Clothes (1922)
- Your Best Friend (1922)
- Notoriety (1922)
- Married People (1922)
- The Drums of Jeopardy (1923)
- Vanity Fair (1923)
- Broken Hearts of Broadway (1923)
- Broadway Gold (1923)
- Broken Laws (1924)
- Daring Love (1924)
- The Girl of Gold (1925)
- If Marriage Fails (1925)
- The Prairie Wife (1925)
- The Red Kimono (1925)
- The Shining Adventure (1925)
- Percy' (1925)
- Keep Smiling (1925)
- Glenister of the Mounted (1926)
- Risky Business (1926)
- The City (1926)
- Horse Shoes (1927)
- Flying Luck (1927)
- White Pants Willie (1927)
- A Perfect Gentleman (1928)
- San Francisco Nights (1928)
- Bare Knees (1928)
- Playthings of Hollywood (1930)
- They Never Come Back (1932)
- The Night Rider (1932)
- The Texas Tornado (1932)
- Guns for Hire (1932)
- Lawless Valley (1932)
- Battling Buckaroo (1932)
- Her Splendid Folly (1933)
- Sucker Money (1933)
- Gunfire (1934)
- The Woman Condemned (1934)
- Fighting Through (1934)
- Range Warfare (1934)
- Border Guns (1934)
- The Murder in the Museum (1934)
- The Road to Ruin (1934)
- The Tonto Kid (1935)
- The Man from Guntown (1935)
- The Reckless Buckaroo (1935)
- Outlaw Rule (1935)
- The Outlaw Tamer (1935)
- The Circle of Death (1935)
- Border Vengeance (1935)
- The Outlaw Deputy (1935)
- The Man from Guntown (1935)
- Fighting Lady (1935)
- Blazing Guns (1935)
- Suicide Squad (1935)
- The Ghost Rider (1935)
- Aces and Eights (1936)
- Gambling with Souls (1936)
- The Reckless Way (1936)
- I'll Name the Murderer (1936)
- A Million to One (1936)

== Bibliography ==
- Klossner, Michael. The Europe of 1500-1815 on Film and Television: A Worldwide Filmography of Over 2550 Works, 1895 Through 2000. McFarland & Company, 2002.
- Pitts, Michael R. Poverty Row Studios, 1929–1940: An Illustrated History of 55 Independent Film Companies, with a Filmography for Each. McFarland & Company, 2005.
- Stumpf, Charles . ZaSu Pitts: The Life and Career. McFarland, 2010.
