= Jane Eyre (1921 film) =

1921 silent film

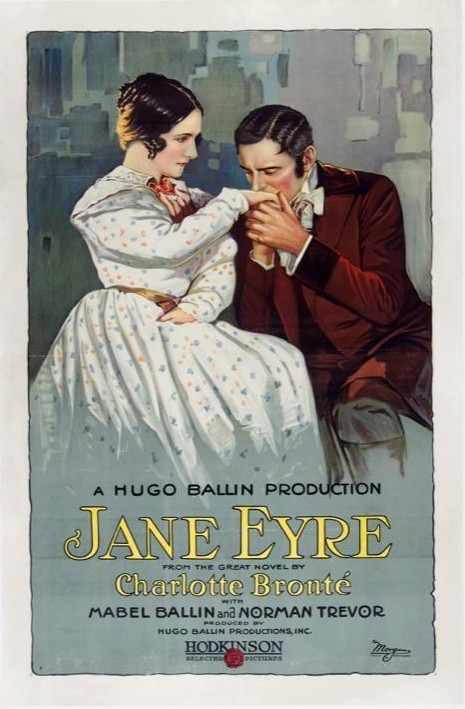
- Directed by: Hugo Ballin
- Written by: Hugo Ballin
- Based on: Jane Eyre by Charlotte Brontë
- Produced by: Hugo Ballin
- Starring: Norman Trevor; Mabel Ballin; Crauford Kent
- Cinematography: James Diamond
- Production company: Hugo Ballin Productions
- Distributed by: Hodkinson Pictures
- Release date: November 6, 1921
- Running time: 70 minutes
- Country: United States
- Languages: Silent; English intertitles

Jane Eyre is a 1921 American silent drama film directed by Hugo Ballin and starring Norman Trevor, Mabel Ballin and Crauford Kent. It is based on the novel of the same title by Charlotte Brontë.

== Cast ==
- Norman Trevor as Mr. Rochester
- Mabel Ballin as Jane Eyre
- Crauford Kent as St. John Rivers
- Emily Fitzroy as Grace Poole, a servant
- John Webb Dillion as Mason, Mrs. Rochester's brother
- Louis R. Grisel as John Eyre, Jane's uncle
- Stephen Carr as John Reed
- Venie Atherton as Miss Fairfax
- Elizabeth Arians as Mrs. Rochester
- Harlan Knight as Mr. Breckelhurst
- Helen Miles as Burns
- Julia Hurley as Rivers' Maid
- Sadie Mullen as Miss Ingram
- June Ellen Terry as Adele, Mr. Rochester's ward
- Florence Flagler as Miss Mason
- Bertha Kent as Mr. Rochester's Maid
- Marie Schaefer as Mrs. Reed

== Preservation ==
- No prints are known to exist of this film hence it is lost.

== Bibliography ==
- Munden, Kenneth White. The American Film Institute Catalog of Motion Pictures Produced in the United States, Part 1. University of California Press, 1997.
