= San Francisco Nights =

1928 film

- Argentine poster
- Directed by: Roy William Neill
- Written by: Leon De Costa (play); Maude Fulton; Harold Shumate
- Starring: Percy Marmont; Mae Busch; George E. Stone
- Cinematography: James Diamond
- Edited by: W. Donn Hayes
- Production company: Gotham Pictures
- Distributed by: Lumas Film Corporation
- Release date: January 30, 1928
- Running time: 70 minutes
- Country: United States
- Language: Silent (English intertitles)

San Francisco Nights is a 1928 American silent drama film directed by Roy William Neill and starring Percy Marmont, Mae Busch, and George E. Stone. It was adapted from "The Fruits of Divroce" by Leon De Costa.

== Cast ==
- Percy Marmont as John Vickery
- Mae Busch as Flo
- Tom O'Brien as 'Red'
- George E. Stone as 'Flash' Hoxy
- Alma Tell as Ruth
- Hobart Cavanaugh as Tommie

== Preservation ==
With no prints of San Francisco Nights located in any film archives, it is a lost film.

== Bibliography ==
- Donald W. McCaffrey & Christopher P. Jacobs. Guide to the Silent Years of American Cinema. Greenwood Publishing, 1999. ISBN 0-313-30345-2
