= Married People (film) =

1922 silent film

- Directed by: Hugo Ballin
- Written by: Hugo Ballin; George S. Hellman
- Produced by: Hugo Ballin
- Starring: Mabel Ballin; Percy Marmont; Ernest Hilliard
- Cinematography: James Diamond
- Production company: Hugo Ballin Productions
- Distributed by: W.W. Hodkinson Distribution
- Release date: September 17, 1922
- Running time: 60 minutes
- Country: United States
- Languages: Silent; English intertitles

Married People is a 1922 American silent drama film directed by Hugo Ballin and starring Mabel Ballin, Percy Marmont and Ernest Hilliard.

== Cast ==
- Mabel Ballin as Dorothy Cluer
- Percy Marmont as Robert Cluer
- Ernest Hilliard as Lord Cranston
- Bobby Clarke as Timmy
- Dick Lee as Mike
- Bertha Kent as Mary
- John Webb Dillion as Bleauvelt
- Louis Dean as The Doctor
- Charles Fang as The Chinese
- Nanci Price as Betty

== Bibliography ==
- Munden, Kenneth White. The American Film Institute Catalog of Motion Pictures Produced in the United States, Part 1. University of California Press, 1997.
