= The Turn of the Wheel =

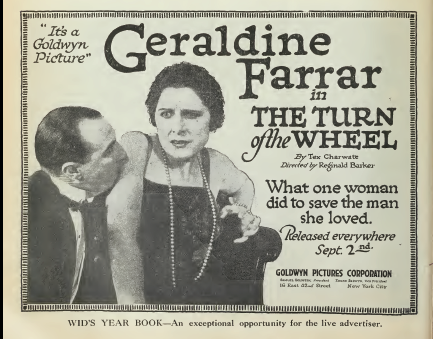
- Lobby card
- Directed by: Reginald Barker
- Written by: Charles Charwate (story, scenario)
- Produced by: Sam Goldwyn
- Starring: Geraldine Farrar
- Cinematography: Percy Hilburn (French)
- Distributed by: Goldwyn Pictures
- Release date: September 1, 1918
- Running time: 50 minutes; 5 reels
- Country: United States
- Language: Silent (English intertitles)

Geraldine Farrar and Herbert Rawlinson

The Turn of the Wheel is a lost 1918 American silent romantic drama film produced and distributed by Goldwyn Pictures. Reginald Barker directed and Geraldine Farrar starred.

== Plot ==
As described in a film magazine, Rosalie Dean dissuades Maxfield Grey of suicide at Monte Carlo and loans him 100 francs, with which he regains his losses. They become fast friends. Without warning, Maxfield is arrested for the murder of his wife in New York and Rosalie is taken in as an accomplice. Rosalie proves an alibi, but Maxfield is returned for trial. He refuses to admit or deny his guilt, and Rosalie, convinced that he is innocent, sets about to find the truth. By shrewdly playing upon the weakness of Wally Gage, she discovers that the shooting was accidental. Maxfield had been maintaining his silence to prevent his brother from being dragged into the mire because of a liaison between his brother's wife and Gage, and that they had been meeting at Maxfield's home with the consent of Mrs. Maxfield Grey. Freed of the murder charge, Maxfield and Rosalie are now free to marry.

== Cast ==
- Geraldine Farrar as Rosalie Dean
- Herbert Rawlinson as Maxfield Grey
- Percy Marmont as Frank Grey
- Violet Heming as Bertha Grey
- Hassard Short as Wally Gage
- Maude Turner Gordon as Rosalie's Aunt
- Henry Carvill as Attorney Stanfield
- Clarence Handyside as American Consul
- Ernest Maupain as Casino Manager
- Mabel Ballin as Young Girl

== Reception ==
Like many American films of the time, The Girl Who Came Back was subject to restrictions and cuts by city and state film censorship boards. For example, the Chicago Board of Censors required, in Reel 1, that a closeup of a roulette wheel be reduced by half.
