= Lord and Lady Algy (film) =

1919 film by Harry Beaumont

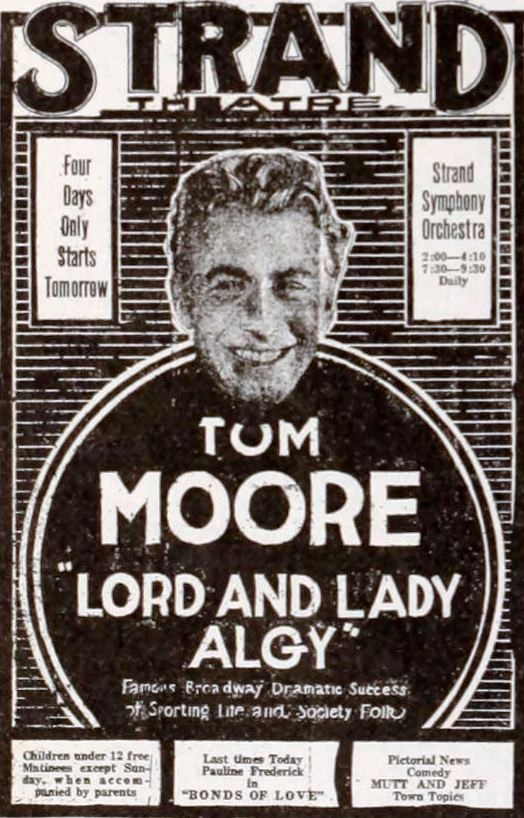
- Newspaper advertisement
- Directed by: Harry Beaumont
- Written by: Edfrid A. Bingham
- Based on: Lord and Lady Algy by R.C. Carton
- Produced by: Samuel Goldwyn
- Starring: Tom Moore; Naomi Childers; Frank Leigh
- Cinematography: George Webber
- Production company: Goldwyn Pictures Corporation
- Distributed by: Goldwyn Distributing Company
- Release date: September 1, 1919
- Running time: 60 minutes
- Country: United States
- Language: Silent (English intertitles)

Lord and Lady Algy is a lost 1919 American silent comedy film directed by Harry Beaumont and starring Tom Moore, Naomi Childers, and Frank Leigh. It is based on a play of the same name by R.C. Carton.

The film's sets were designed by the art director Hugo Ballin.

== Plot ==
As described in a film magazine, Lord Algy is addicted to betting, which causes an estrangement with his wife, Lady Algy. They part under an informal arrangement, although each continues to admire the other. Lord Algy determines to retrench his fortune by backing a certain horse in a race. Lady Algy, knowing the horse cannot win, makes friends with Jethroe to get a tip on the race, hoping to win enough to recoup her husband's losses. Mrs. Tudway, wife of a friend of Lord Algy, plans to run away with another man. Algy learns of the plan and cooperates, allowing the elopers the use of his chambers as a rendezvous, hoping to persuade Mrs. Tudway to stay with her husband. Scandal then connects the names of Lady Algy with Jethroe and of Lord Algy with Mrs. Tudway. Algy's horse loses the race while Lady Algy's wins. Brabazon Tudway discovers his wife in Lord Algy's chambers and suspects him of stealing her affections. Lady Algy arrives, grasps the situation at a glance, and diplomatically smooths things over. She tells Lord Algy of her success with the race and they are reunited.

== Cast ==
- Tom Moore as Lord Algy
- Naomi Childers as Lady Algy
- Leslie Stuart as Jethroe
- Frank Leigh as Marquis of Quarmby
- William Burress as Brabazon Tudway
- Alec B. Francis as Swepson
- Philo McCullough as Standage
- Mabel Ballin as Mrs. Tudway
- Kate Lester as Mrs. Vokins
- Hal Taintor as Annesley
- Herbert Standing as Undetermined Role
- Jack Duffy as Undetermined Role

== Bibliography ==
- Gmür, Leonhard. Rex Ingram: Hollywood's Rebel of the Silver Screen. Impressum, 2013.
