= Other Women's Clothes =

1922 silent film

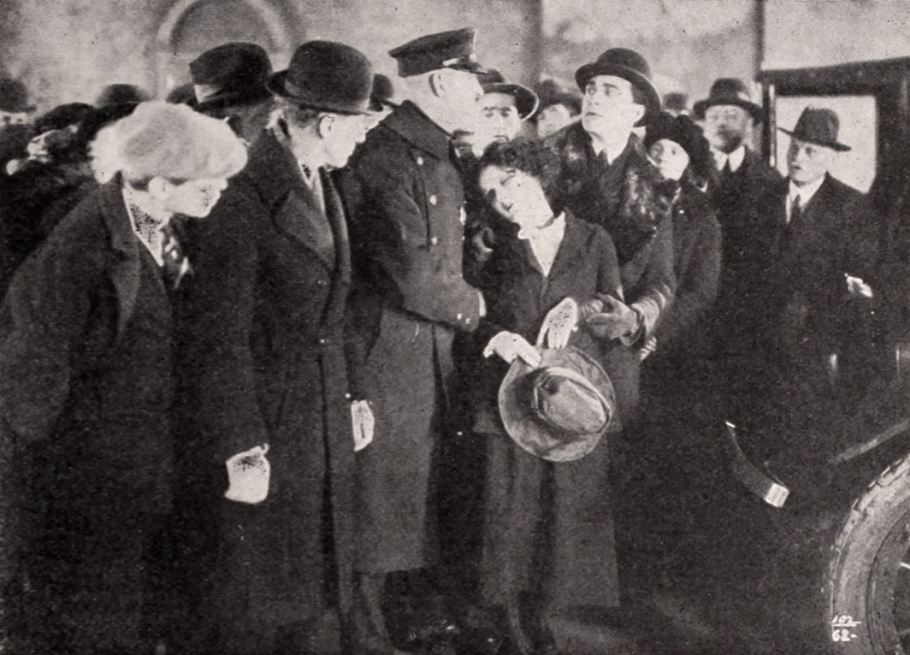
- Directed by: Hugo Ballin
- Written by: Ethel Donoher (story); Hugo Ballin
- Produced by: Hugo Ballin
- Starring: Mabel Ballin; Raymond Bloomer; Crauford Kent
- Cinematography: James Diamond
- Production company: Hugo Ballin Productions
- Distributed by: Hodkinson Pictures
- Release date: February 19, 1922
- Running time: 60 minutes
- Country: United States
- Languages: Silent; English intertitles

Other Women's Clothes is a 1922 American silent drama film directed by Hugo Ballin and starring Mabel Ballin, Raymond Bloomer and Crauford Kent.

== Synopsis ==
Wishing to help financially support a struggling model he has fallen in love with, a wealthy man invents a secret wealthy relative who leaves her a fortune as inheritance. However, when she discovers his deception she disappears and they are only reunited some years later after a chance meeting following a car accident.

== Cast ==
- Mabel Ballin as Jacqueline Lee
- Raymond Bloomer as Barker Garrison
- Crauford Kent as Rupert Lewis
- May Kitson as Mrs. Roger Montayne
- William H. Strauss as Joe Feinberg
- Aggie La Field as Bessie Horowitz
- Rose Burdick as Ellen Downe

== Censorship ==
Before Other Women's Clothes could be exhibited in Kansas, the Kansas Board of Review required the elimination and shortening of several scenes. In reel 4, a semi-nude dancer's close-up is eliminated, as well as the intertitle "My God, she's fanning," and Lewis making advances towards a girl is shortened. Two scenes of women inviting Barker in reel 6 are removed.

== Bibliography ==
- Munden, Kenneth White. The American Film Institute Catalog of Motion Pictures Produced in the United States, Part 1. University of California Press, 1997.
