= Patricia Marmont =

American-born British actress (1921–2020)

- Born: 9 August 1921; Beechhurst, Queens, New York, U.S.
- Died: 3 December 2020 (aged 99); Northwood, London, England
- Occupations: Actress, businesswoman, entrepreneur, theatrical agent
- Years active: 1946–2004
- Spouse(s): Nigel Green (m. 1952; div. ??)
- Relatives: Percy Marmont (father), Pam Marmont (sister), Moray Watson (brother-in-law)

Patricia Eileen Marmont (9 August 1921 – 3 December 2020) was an American-born British actress in Hollywood films and on television, and a theatrical agent. Marmont's best known role was as the Trojan princess Andromache in the 1956 film Helen of Troy. She played Lady de Courcier in The Adventures of Robin Hood episode "The Miser" (1956). In 1961 she appeared in Danger Man in the episode "Name, Date, Place" as Rosemary.

== Life and career ==
Marmont was born in August 1921 in Beechhurst, Queens, New York, the daughter of film actor Percy Marmont. During World War II, she served in the Women's Army Corps (WAC) and was stationed in England. In 1949, she appeared opposite Cary Grant in I Was a Male War Bride, in which she portrayed a lieutenant from Boston, Massachusetts based in England during wartime. For a period, she was married to character actor Nigel Green. The two later divorced, and Green died from an accidental overdose of sleeping tablets in 1972.

She retired from acting in the 1970s and relocated to London. During this period, Marmont become a theatrical agent, working first with Larry Dalzell (1933–2011) for many years. In 1983 she formed her own company, Marmont Management Ltd, and became hugely successful, representing the likes of actors William H. Macy, Guy Henry, Patricia Routledge, Kenneth Branagh, Alex Jennings, and Julia Ormond.

== Personal life and death ==
Marmont had a sister, Pamela (1923–1999), who became a successful actress in her own right. Pam Marmont was married to fellow actor Moray Watson, who died in 2017.

She died at Denville Hall in Northwood, London, England in December 2020 at the age of 99, just 8 months shy of her 100th birthday.

== Filmography ==
Year	Title	Role	Notes
1946	Loyal Heart	Joan Stewart	
1949	I Was a Male War Bride	Female Reception Officer	Uncredited
1954	Front Page Story	Julie	
1954	The Crowded Day	Eve	
1956	Helen of Troy	Andromache	
1957	Fortune Is a Woman	Ambrosine	
1957	Scotland Yard (film series) - The Tyburn Case	Miss Sims	
1957	No Time for Tears	Sister Davies	
1959	Suddenly, Last Summer	Nurse Benson	
1961	Mary Had a Little...	Angie	
1961	The World of Tim Frazer	Vivien Gilmore	4 episodes
2004	Fakers	Maria	(final film role)
