= The Journey's End (film) =

1921 silent film

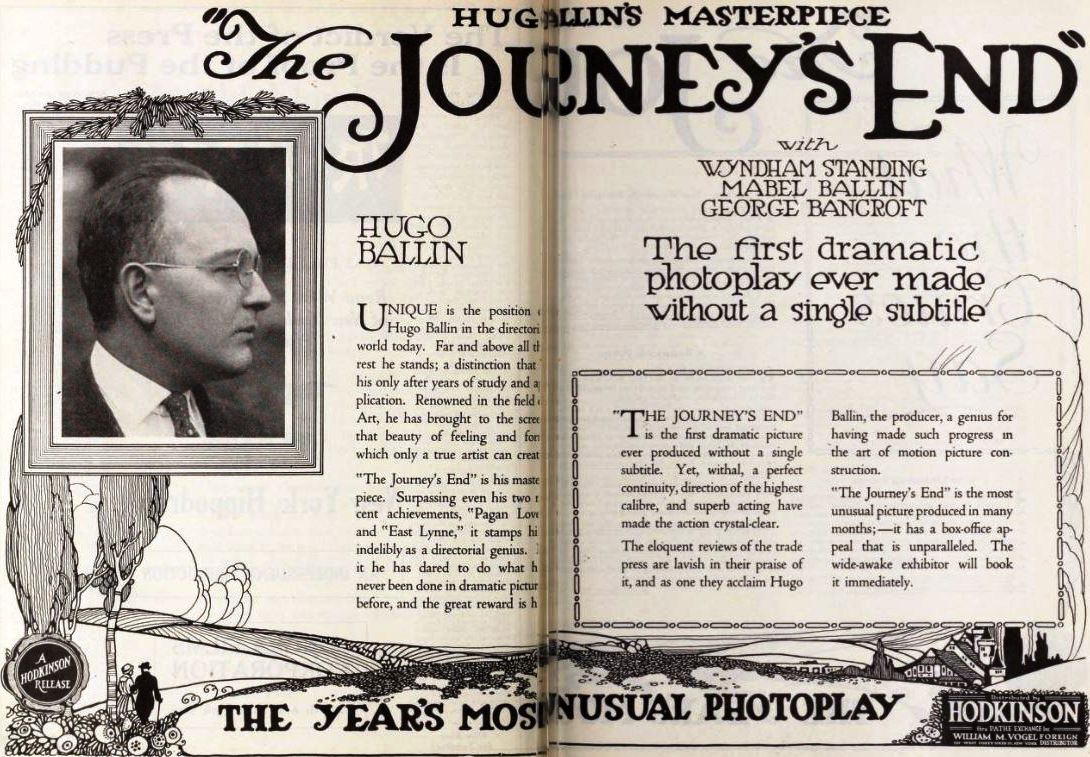
- Directed by: Hugo Ballin
- Written by: Hugo Ballin
- Produced by: Hugo Ballin
- Starring: Mabel Ballin; George Bancroft; Wyndham Standing
- Cinematography: James Diamond
- Production company: Hugo Ballin Productions
- Distributed by: Hodkinson Pictures
- Release date: July 17, 1921
- Running time: 80 minutes
- Country: United States
- Languages: Silent; English intertitles

The Journey's End is a 1921 American silent drama film directed by Hugo Ballin and starring Mabel Ballin, George Bancroft and Wyndham Standing.

== Cast ==
- Mabel Ballin as The Girl
- George Bancroft as The Ironworker
- Wyndham Standing as The Mill Owner
- Georgette Bancroft as The Child
- John T. Dillon as The Uncle

== Subtitles ==
The film has no subtitles, which was unusual for a silent film. Its marketing made note of the fact that it was the first serious drama to not use subtitles. This distinguished it from The Old Swimmin' Hole which came out earlier in 1921 but had a simpler plot.

== Bibliography ==
- Munden, Kenneth White. The American Film Institute Catalog of Motion Pictures Produced in the United States, Part 1. University of California Press, 1997.
