= East Lynne (1921 film) =

1921 silent film

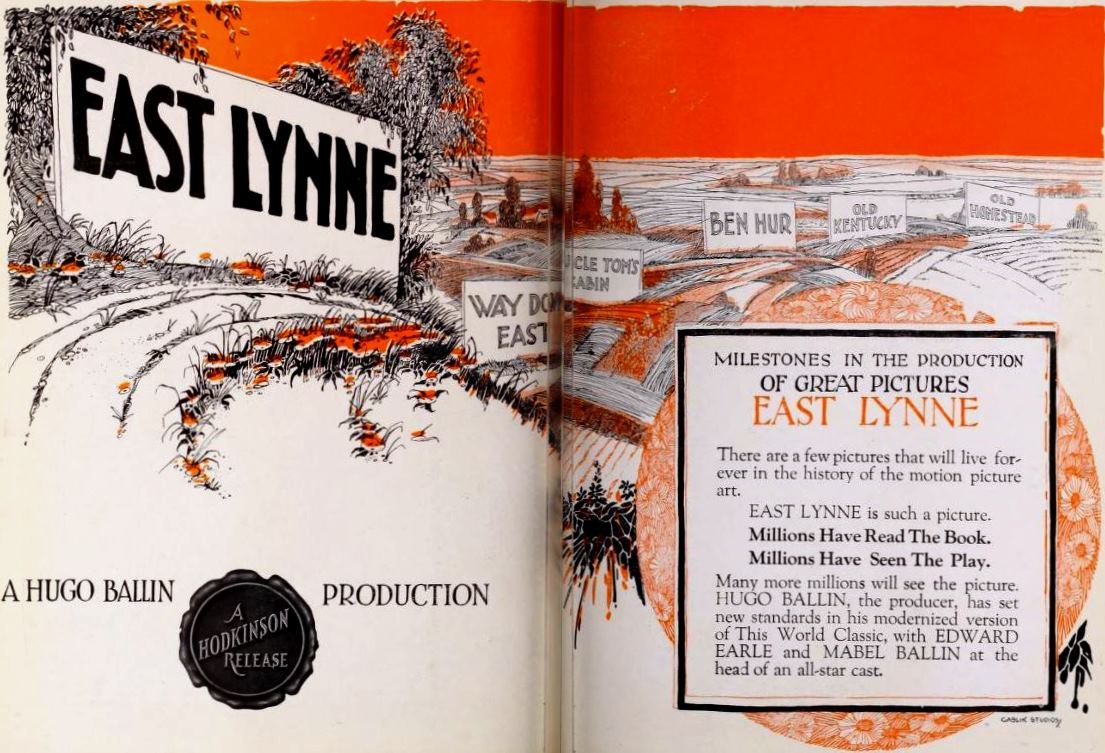
- Directed by: Hugo Ballin
- Written by: Hugo Ballin
- Based on: East Lynne by Ellen Wood
- Produced by: Hugo Ballin
- Starring: Edward Earle; Mabel Ballin; Henry G. Sell
- Cinematography: William S. Adams
- Production company: Hugo Ballin Productions
- Distributed by: W.W. Hodkinson Distribution
- Release date: March 27, 1921
- Running time: 70 minutes
- Country: United States
- Languages: Silent; English intertitles

East Lynne is a 1921 American silent drama film directed by Hugo Ballin and starring Edward Earle, Mabel Ballin and Henry G. Sell. Now considered a lost film, it is one of numerous film versions of Ellen Wood's 1861 Victorian novel East Lynne.

== Cast ==
- Edward Earle as Archibald Carlyle
- Mabel Ballin as Isabel Vane
- Gladys Coburn as Barbara Hare
- Gilbert Rooney as Richard Hare
- Henry G. Sell as Francis Levison
- Nellie Parker Spaulding as Miss Cornelia
- Doris Sheerin as Afy Hallijohn

== Bibliography ==
- Munden, Kenneth White. The American Film Institute Catalog of Motion Pictures Produced in the United States, Part 1. University of California Press, 1997.
