= Leon De Costa =

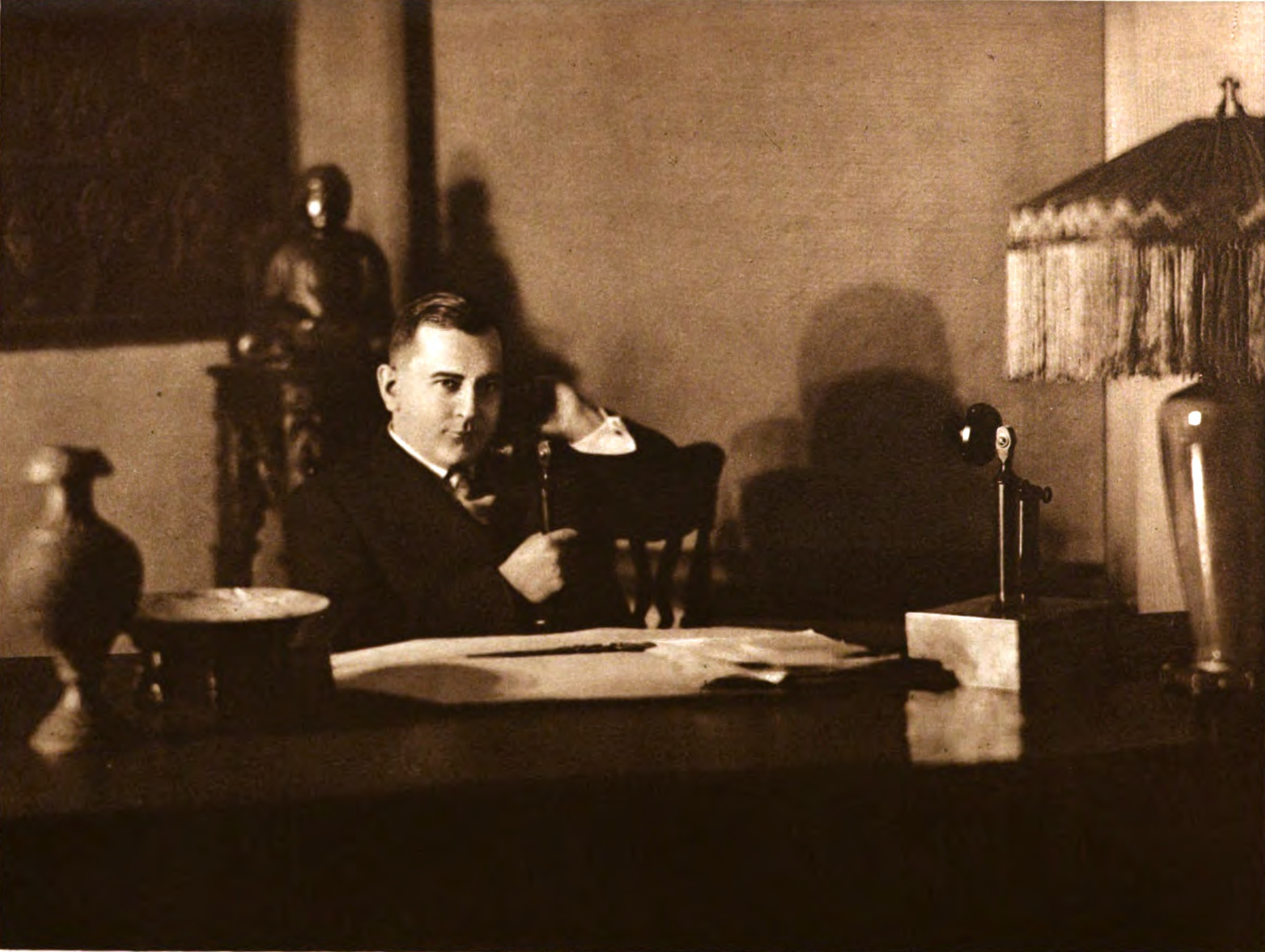

Leon De Costa (died May 10, 1951 aged 68) was a composer and playwright from Barcelona, Spain who emigrated to the United States. His father was a minister of the Spanish Regency. Leon De Costa served in the U.S. Army during World War I.

Performers recorded his songs "I'm Neutral" and "Kosher Kitty Kelly". He was a deponent in a court case over rights to the Kitty Kelly play.

In 1925 he was recovering from cuts and other injuries sustained in a taxicab accident.

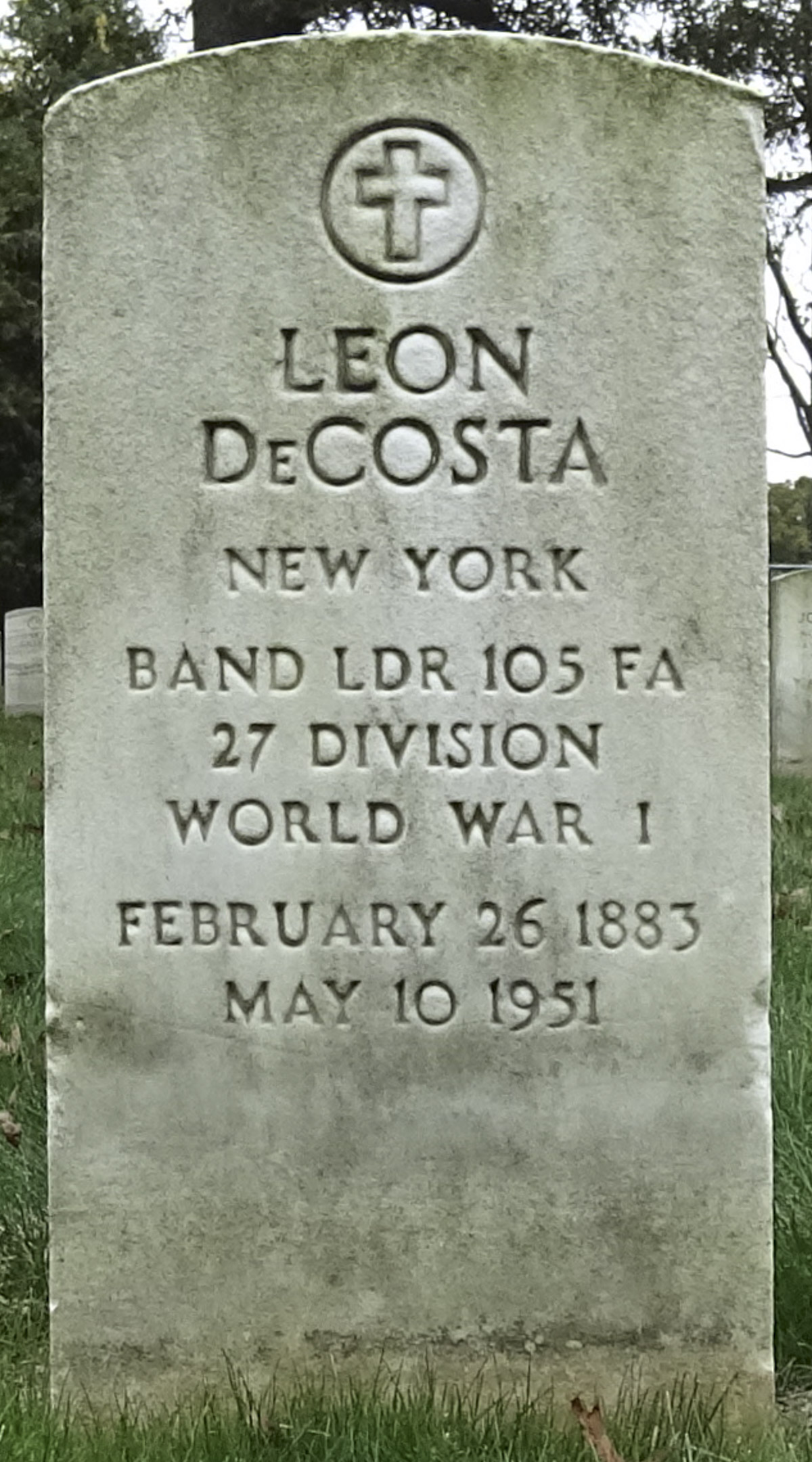
Grave at Long Island National Cemetery

He died in 1951 and was buried at Long Island National Cemetery.

== Songs ==
- "To the Skies" (1917), dedicated to Frederick Handley Page
- "One Happy Day" (1917), words and music, sheet music
- "Honey Bunch" (1919), words and music
- "I'm Neutral"
- "Kosher Kitty Kelly"
- "Beautiful World"
- "Circus Days" (1923)
- "Come Along Mandy" (1924)
- "Life's Sea and You"(1934)
- "The Life Time Prisoner" (1934)
- "Lifeless Life" (1934)
- "A Little Farm in Old Vermont" (1934)
- "Lilac Time Lullaby" (1934)

== Theater ==
- You Know Me Al! (April 11, 1918 - April 27, 1918), musical director and songwriter
- Fifty-Fifty, Ltd. (October 27, 1919 - November 29, 1919), music and lyrics
- Kosher Kitty Kelly (June 15, 1925 - December 10, 1925, writer of musical
- The Blonde Sinner (Jul 14, 1926 - Dec 1926), writer

== Filmography ==
- Kosher Kitty Kelly (1926), based on his play of the same name
- San Francisco Nights (1928), adapted from De Costa's play The Fruits of Divorce
