= John Webb Dillon =

English actor (1877–1949)

- Born: 6 February 1877; London, England
- Died: 20 December 1949 (aged 72); Hollywood, California, US
- Occupation: Actor
- Years active: 1911–1947
- Spouse: Catherine Urlau

John Webb Dillon a.k.a. Jack Dillion (6 February 1877 – 20 December 1949) was an English actor. He appeared in more than 80 films between 1911 and 1947. He was born in London and died in Hollywood, California, US. He was married to Catherine Urlau.

== Selected filmography ==
- The Woman's Law (1916)
- Romeo and Juliet (1916)
- The Primitive Call (1917)
- The Darling of Paris (1917)
- The Tiger Woman (1917)
- Heart and Soul (1917)
- The House of Hate (1918)
- Joan of Plattsburg (1918)
- A Scream in the Night (1919)
- Trailed by Three (1920)
- The Law of the Yukon (1920)
- The Inner Chamber (1921)
- Jane Eyre (1921)
- Speed (1922)
- The Mohican's Daughter (1922)
- The Rapids (1922)
- Married People (1922)
- Tiger Thompson (1924)
- The Devil's Cargo (1925)
- The Air Mail (1925)
- The Great Jewel Robbery (1925)
- The Seventh Bandit (1926)
- Snowed In (1926)
- The House Without a Key (1926)
- The Trail of the Tiger (1927)
- The Tiger's Shadow (1928)
- Dry Martini (1928)
- The Black Book (1929)
- The Cisco Kid (1931)
- Sally of the Subway (1932)
