= Percy Marmont =

English actor (1883–1977)

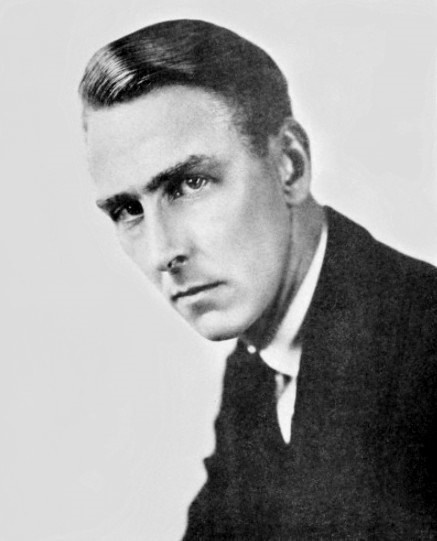
- Marmont c. 1920
- Born: 25 November 1883; London, England
- Died: 3 March 1977 (aged 93); London, England
- Occupation: Actor
- Years active: 1916–1968
- Spouses: Elsie Marguerite Davison (m. 1908, divorced): Dorothy Stewart-Dawson
- Children: 2, including Patricia Marmont

Percy Marmont (25 November 1883 – 3 March 1977) was an English film actor.

== Biography ==
Marmont appeared in more than 80 films between 1916 and 1968 and is perhaps best remembered today for his supporting roles in British films, particularly those of Alfred Hitchcock. Prior to this, he had a successful career as a matinee idol in Hollywood during the silent era. He scored a big hit with If Winter Comes (later remade by MGM in 1947) and played the title character in Lord Jim (1925), the first film version of Joseph Conrad's novel, as well as playing one of Clara Bow's love interests in the Paramount Pictures film Mantrap (1926).

He was born and died in London, England. Marmont had two daughters with his wife Dorothy, Patricia Marmont, an actress and later theatrical agent (at one time married to actor Nigel Green) and Pamela, a stage actress married to the actor Moray Watson.

== Filmography ==
- De Voortrekkers (1916) as Horseman (uncredited)
- The Monk and the Woman (1917) as Brother Paul
- Rose of the World (1918) as Lieutenant Belhune
- The Lie (1918) as Nol Dibdin
- The Turn of the Wheel (1918) as Frank Grey
- In the Hollow of Her Hand (1918) as Brandon Booth
- The Indestructible Wife (1919) as Schuyler Horne
- Three Men and a Girl (1919) as Dr. Henry Forsyth
- The Winchester Woman (1919) as David Brinton
- The Climbers (1919) as Ned Warden
- The Vengeance of Durand (1919) as Tom Franklin
- Slaves of Pride (1920) as Brewster Howard
- The Sporting Duchess (1920) as Douglas, Duke of Desborough
- Away Goes Prudence (1920) as Hewitt Harland
- The Branded Woman (1920) as Douglas Courtenay
- Dead Men Tell No Tales (1920) as George Stevenson Cole
- What's Your Reputation Worth? (1921) as Anthony Blake
- Love's Penalty (1921) as Steven Saunders
- Without Benefit of Clergy (1921)
- Wife Against Wife (1921) as Stannard Dole
- The First Woman (1922) as Paul Marsh
- Married People (1922) as Robert Cluer
- If Winter Comes (1923) as Mark Sabre
- The Midnight Alarm (1923) as Captain Harry Westmore
- The Light That Failed (1923) as Dick Heldar
- Broadway Broke (1923) as Tom Kerrigan
- You Can't Get Away with It (1923) as Charles Hemingway
- The Man Life Passed By (1923) as John Turbin
- The Shooting of Dan McGrew (1924) as Jim, Lou's Husband
- The Marriage Cheat (1924) as Paul Mayne
- When a Girl Loves (1924) as Count Michael
- The Enemy Sex (1924) as Garry Lindaberry
- The Legend of Hollywood (1924) as John Smith
- The Clean Heart (1924) as Philip Wriford
- Broken Laws (1924) as Richard Heath
- K – The Unknown (1924)) as 'K' Le Moyne
- Idle Tongues (1924) as Dr. Ephraim Nye
- Daddy's Gone A-Hunting (1925) as Julian
- Just a Woman (1925) as George Rand
- The Street of Forgotten Men (1925) as Easy Money Charley
- A Woman's Faith (1925) as Donovan Steele
- The Shining Adventure (1925) as Dr. Hugo McLean
- Fine Clothes (1925) as Peter Hungerford
- Lord Jim (1925) as Lord Jim
- Infatuation (1925) as Sir Arthur Little
- The Miracle of Life (1926) as Blair Howell
- Fascinating Youth (1926) as Percy Marmont
- Aloma of the South Seas (1926) as Bob Holden
- Mantrap (1926) as Ralph Prescott
- San Francisco Nights (1928) as John Vickery
- The Stronger Will (1928) as Clive Morton
- Yellow Stockings (1928) as Gavin Sinclair
- Sir or Madam (1928) as Sir Ralph Wellalone
- The Warning (1928) as Jim
- The Lady of the Lake (1928) as James FitzJames
- The Silver King (1929) as Wilfred Denver
- The Squeaker (1930) as Captain Leslie
- Cross Roads (1930) as Jim Wyndham
- The Loves of Ariane (1931) as Anthony Fraser
- The Written Law (1931) as Sir John Rochester
- Rich and Strange (1931) as Commander Gordon
- The Silver Greyhound (1932) as Norton Fitzwarren
- The Blind Spot (1932) as Holland Janney
- Say It with Music (1932) as Philip Weston
- Her Imaginary Lover (1933) as Lord Michael Ware
- White Lilac (1935) as Tollitt
- Vanity (1935) as Jefferson Brown
- Secret Agent (1936) as Caypor
- The Captain's Table (1936) as John Brooke
- David Livingstone (1936) as David Livingstone
- Conquest of the Air (1936) as Wilbur Wright (uncredited)
- Action for Slander (1937) as William Cowbit
- The Pearls of the Crown (1937) as Le cardinal Wolsey (uncredited)
- Young and Innocent (1937) as Col. Burgoyne
- Those Kids from Town (1942) as Earl
- Penn of Pennsylvania (1942) as Holme
- I'll Walk Beside You (1943) as Vicar
- Loyal Heart (1946) as John Armstrong
- No Orchids for Miss Blandish (1948) as John Blandish
- Dark Secret (1949) as Vicar
- The Gambler and the Lady (1952) as Lord Willens-Hortland
- Four Sided Triangle (1953) as Sir Walter
- The Million Pound Note (1954) as Lord Hurlingham (uncredited)
- Knave of Hearts (1954) as Catherine's Father (uncredited)
- Footsteps in the Fog (1955) as Magistrate
- Lisbon (1956) as Lloyd Merrill
- The Trials of Oscar Wilde (1960) as Guest at Theatre (uncredited)
- Hostile Witness (1968) as Justice Matthew Gregory
