= Mammy Lou =

American actress

Mammy Lou (born c. 1804 - died after 1918) claimed to have reached an age that would make her one of the earliest-born people to appear in a motion picture.

== Life ==
In 1918, she appeared in the silent film The Glorious Adventure, directed by Hobart Henley, playing the part of The Mansion's Servant, the mansion being the Hermitage Plantation in Savannah, Georgia. Mammy Lou claimed she was 114 years of age, and had been a slave in Savannah until Abraham Lincoln abolished slavery; if proven, this would mean that Mammy Lou was around 60 years of age at the time she received her freedom from slavery.

If this legend is true, then Mammy Lou was one of the earliest-born individuals to appear in a feature film up until that time. The claim is unauthenticated, though, and a better claim may be made for Rebecca Clark(e), who appeared in a Kinora reel made no later than 1912 (Reel 145, "Rebecca Clarke and kitten"), and who has been proved to have been born in Dunstable, Bedfordshire, on 5 June 1810.

Mammy Lou does not appear on the list of American supercentenarians as her age has not been verified by the Gerontology Research Group.

== See also ==
- Longevity claims
- List of slaves

== Bibliography ==
- Patrick Robinson, Film Facts, 1st edition (London: Aurum Press Ltd., 2001)
