= Kosher Kitty Kelly =

1926 film by James W. Horne

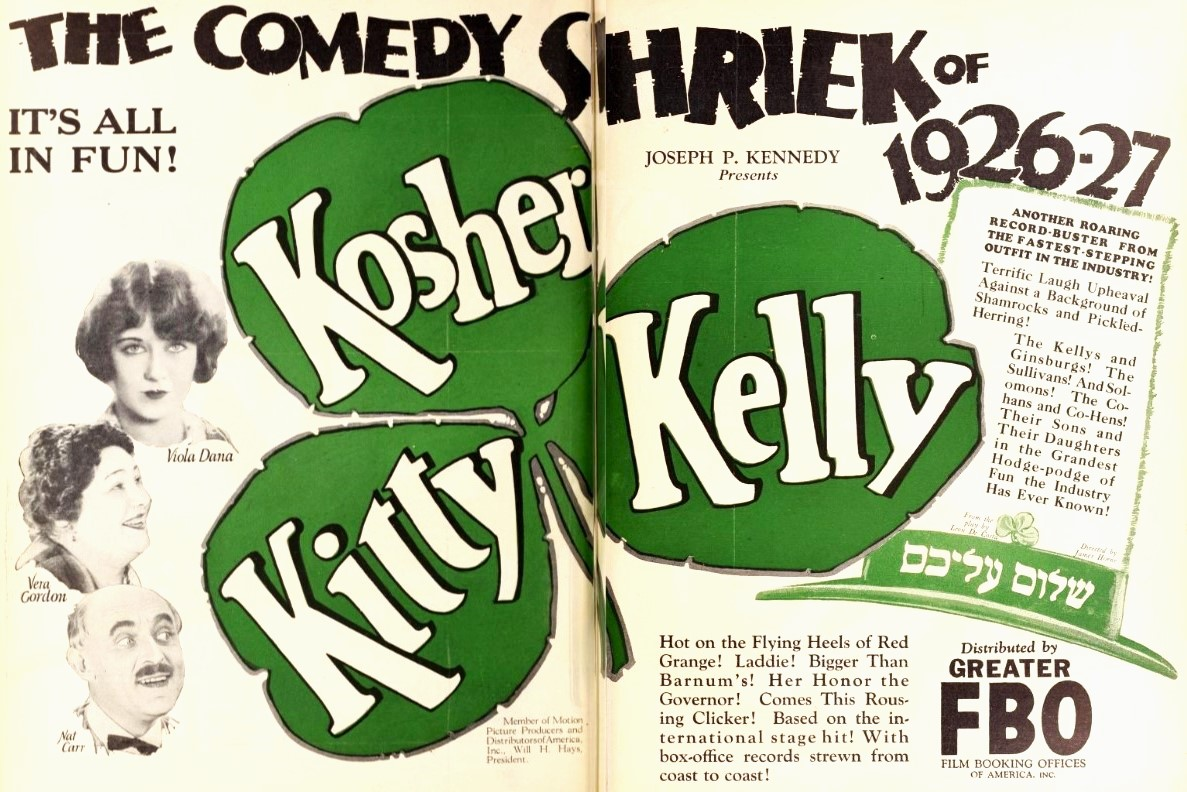
- Advertisement
- Directed by: James W. Horne
- Written by: Gerald C. Duffy (scenario)
- Based on: Kosher Kitty Kelly by Leon De Costa
- Produced by: Joseph P. Kennedy Sr.
- Starring: Viola Dana
- Cinematography: Allan Siegler
- Production company: Robertson-Cole Pictures Corporation
- Distributed by: Film Booking Offices of America
- Release date: September 5, 1926
- Running time: 7 reels (6,103 feet)
- Country: United States
- Language: Silent (English intertitles)

Kosher Kitty Kelly is a 1926 American silent comedy drama film directed by James W. Horne, produced by Joseph P. Kennedy Sr. (Robertson-Cole), and distributed by Film Booking Offices of America (FBO). It is based on the stage musical Kosher Kitty Kelly by Leon De Costa, the film stars Viola Dana.

== Cast ==
- Viola Dana as Kitty Kelly
- Tom B. Forman as Officer Pat Sullivan
- Vera Gordon as Mrs. Feinbaum
- Kathleen Myers as Rosie Feinbaum
- Nat Carr as Moses Ginsburg
- Stanley Taylor as Morris Rosen
- Carroll Nye as Barney Kelly
- Aggie Herring as Mrs. Kelly

== Preservation ==
A print of Kosher Kitty Kelly is preserved at the Library of Congress; however, it is missing a reel.
