= Hugo Ballin =

American painter

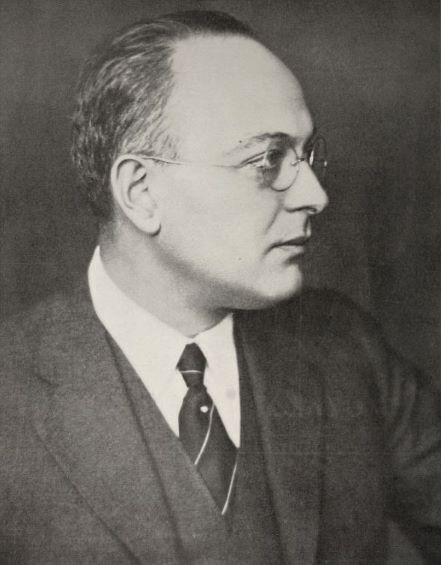
- Ballin in 1924
- Born: March 7, 1879; New York City, U.S.
- Died: November 27, 1956 (aged 77); Santa Monica, California, U.S.
- Years active: 1910–1956
- Spouse: Mabel Croft (m. 1909)

Hugo Ballin NA (March 7, 1879 – November 27, 1956) was an American artist, muralist, author, and film director. Ballin was a member of the National Institute of Arts and Letters and the National Academy of Design.

== Biography ==
Ballin was born in New York City and studied at the Art Students League of New York. When the Wisconsin State Capital was built in the early 20th century, Ballin created 26 murals for its interior. In 1917, he began working for Goldwyn Pictures in New Jersey as an art director and production designer, and in 1921, he moved to Los Angeles at the request of Samuel Goldwyn. He was soon also directing, writing, and producing silent films for his own production company. He was married to the actress Mabel Croft Ballin.

When Hollywood began making talking pictures, Ballin left the film industry to return to his first career as a classically trained artist. He became one of the foremost muralists in the Los Angeles area, producing murals which still stand at landmark locations such as Griffith Observatory, Wilshire Boulevard Temple, LA County General Hospital (now known as Los Angeles County-USC Medical Center), and Burbank City Hall.

Ballin became a National Academician in 1906, when the Society of American Artists, to which he was elected in 1905, merged with the Nation Academy of Design. That same year, Ballin received the National Academy of Design's Thomas B. Clarke Prize for his work, "Mother and Child". In 1940, for his work "The Deposition", depicting Christ being removed from the cross, he was again awarded the Clarke Prize, a rare occurrence in Academy history.

His primary work studio was at his home in Pacific Palisades, California. He is buried in Woodlawn Memorial Cemetery, Santa Monica, location of one of his final commissions, a set of frescoes depicting the life and death of Christ. His work was also part of the painting event in the art competition at the 1932 Summer Olympics.

== Selected murals ==
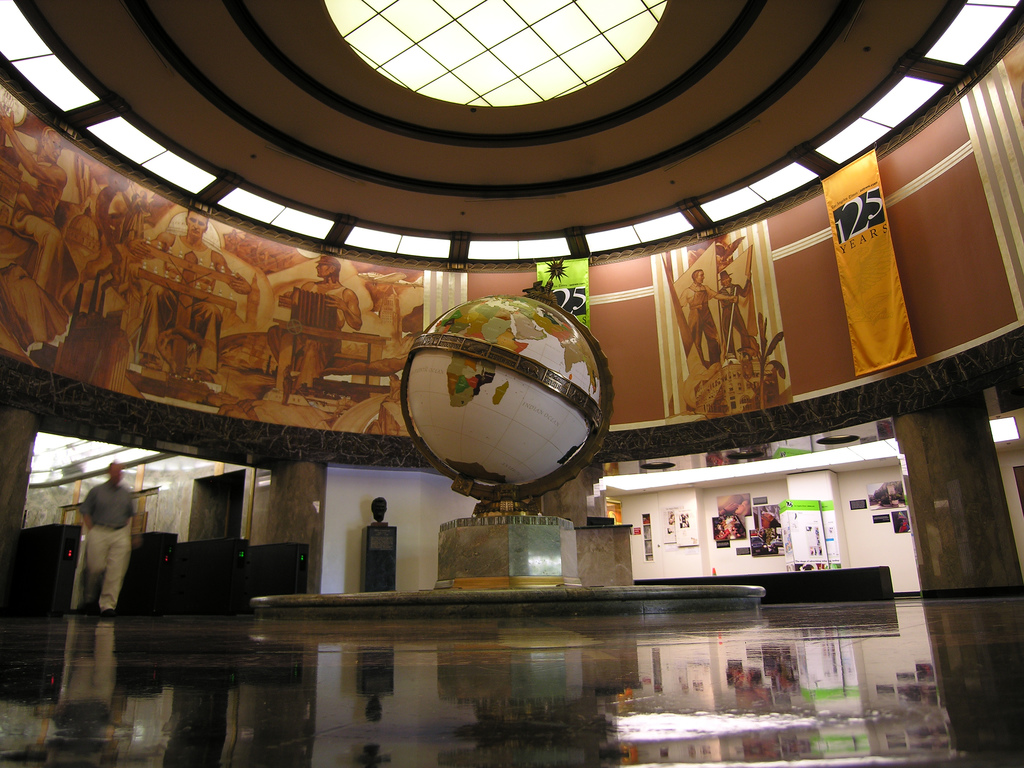
Ballin's murals in the lobby of the Los Angeles Times Building

- Burbank Industry mural (Burbank City Hall)
- A series of fresco murals depicting the medical sciences in the vaults and groins of the entry to Los Angeles County General Hospital (nka LAC-USC Medical Center), a building also containing works by sculptor S. Cartaino Scarpitta. The murals are the only known public frescos created by Ballin.
- Murals in the Globe Lobby of the Los Angeles Times Building
- Six murals depicting California history (La Brea Tar Pits, Spanish Period, Treaty of Cauenga, First Survey of Los Angeles, Coming of the Railroad and The Modern Scene) in the elevator lobby of the Title Guarantee and Trust Company Building/Los Angeles Public Library
- Rudimentary Education, a mural sponsored and commissioned by the federal Public Works of Art Project at El Rodeo Elementary School, Beverly Hills
- The Apotheosis of Power (Southern California Edison Building/One Bunker Hill along with the works of Robert Merrell Gage, Barse Miller and Conrad Buff)
- The Four Freedoms mural (Burbank City Hall)
- The March of Science Through the Ages (Griffith Observatory, Los Angeles, California)
- Warner Memorial Murals (Wilshire Boulevard Temple)
- Water, Power, and Light mural (Burbank Water and Power Administration Building)

== Selected bibliography ==
- Mural Paintings in the Executive Chamber State Capitol Building, Madison, Wis. (1913)
- The Broken Toy (1924)
- The Woman at the Door (1925)
- Stigma (1928)
- Dolce Far Niente (1933)

== Selected filmography ==
- Baby Mine (1917)
- Thais (1917)
- Back to the Woods (1918)
- The Glorious Adventure (1918)
- The Face in the Dark (1918)
- The Kingdom of Youth (1918)
- Lord and Lady Algy (1919)
- Pagan Love (1920)
- East Lynne (1921)
- Jane Eyre (1921)
- The Journey's End (1921)
- Other Women's Clothes (1922)
- Married People (1922)
- Vanity Fair (1923)
- Souls for Sale (1923)
- The Prairie Wife (1925)
- The Shining Adventure (1925)
- The Love of Sunya (1927), produced by and starring Gloria Swanson
