= Vanity Fair (1923 film) =

1923 film

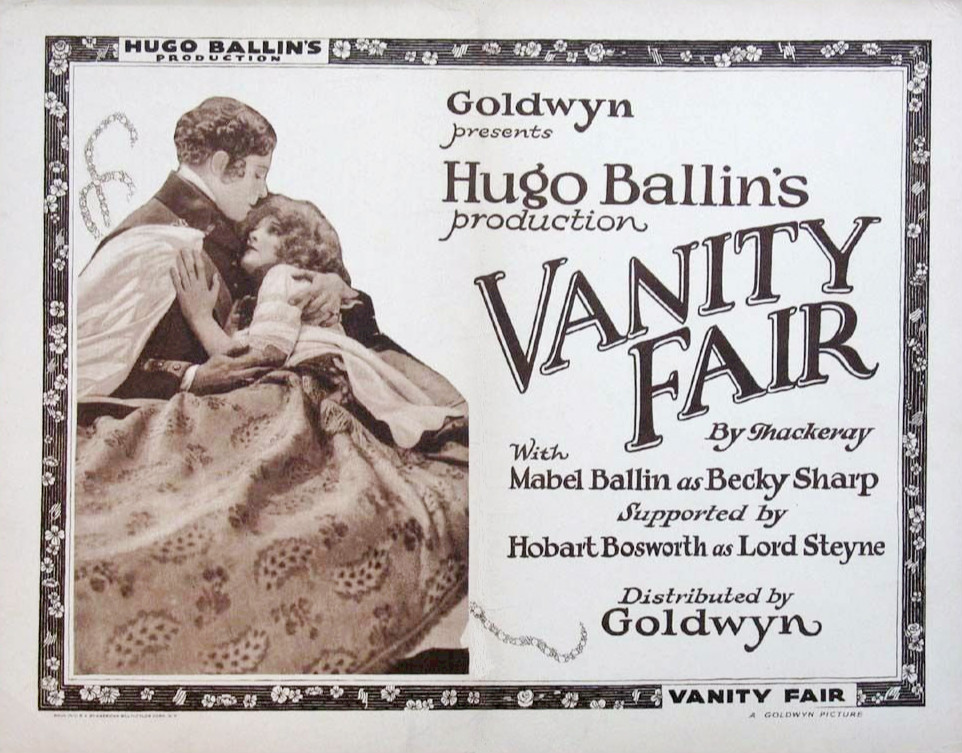
- Lobby card
- Directed by: Hugo Ballin
- Written by: Hugo Ballin (scenario)
- Based on: Vanity Fair; 1848 novel by William Makepeace Thackeray
- Produced by: Hugo Ballin
- Starring: Mabel Ballin; Hobart Bosworth; George Walsh
- Cinematography: James Diamond
- Production company: Hugo Ballin Productions
- Distributed by: Goldwyn Pictures
- Release date: March 25, 1923
- Running time: 80+ minutes 8 reels (7,668 ft)
- Country: United States
- Language: Silent (English intertitles)

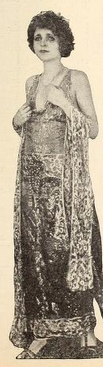
Mabel Ballin, in Vanity Fair

Vanity Fair (1923) is a lost silent feature film directed by Hugo Ballin and released by Samuel Goldwyn.

== Cast ==
- Mabel Ballin as Becky Sharp
- Hobart Bosworth as Marquis of Steyne
- George Walsh as Rawdon Crawley
- Harrison Ford as George Osborne
- Earle Foxe as Captain Dobbin
- Willard Louis as Joseph Sedley
- Eleanor Boardman as Amelia Sedley
- Bobby Mack as Sir Pitt Crawley (as Robert Mack)
- William J. Humphrey as Mr Sedley (credited as William Humphreys)
- Dorcas Matthews as Lady Jane
- Laura La Varnie as Miss Crawley
- James A. Marcus as Old Osborne
- Eugene Acker as Max
- Leo White as Isadore
- Tempe Pigott as Mrs Sedley

== Production background ==
The film included one sequence filmed in color by Prizmacolor. This silent film was a version of the 1848 novel Vanity Fair by William Makepeace Thackeray. The film starred Ballin's wife Mabel Ballin as Becky Sharp and Hobart Bosworth as the Marquis of Steyne.

== Preservation status ==
Vanity Fair is now considered to be a lost film.

== See also ==
- List of lost films
- List of early color feature films
