= Eva Dadlez =

American philosopher

E. M. Dadlez

Education
- Education: Syracuse University (BA, MLS, MA, PhD)

Philosophical work
- Era: 21st-century philosophy
- Region: Western philosophy
- Institutions: University of Central Oklahoma
- Main interests: aesthetics, ethics, philosophy of fiction
- Notable ideas: Exploration of the relationship between art, emotion, and morality
- Website: https://www.evadadlez.com/

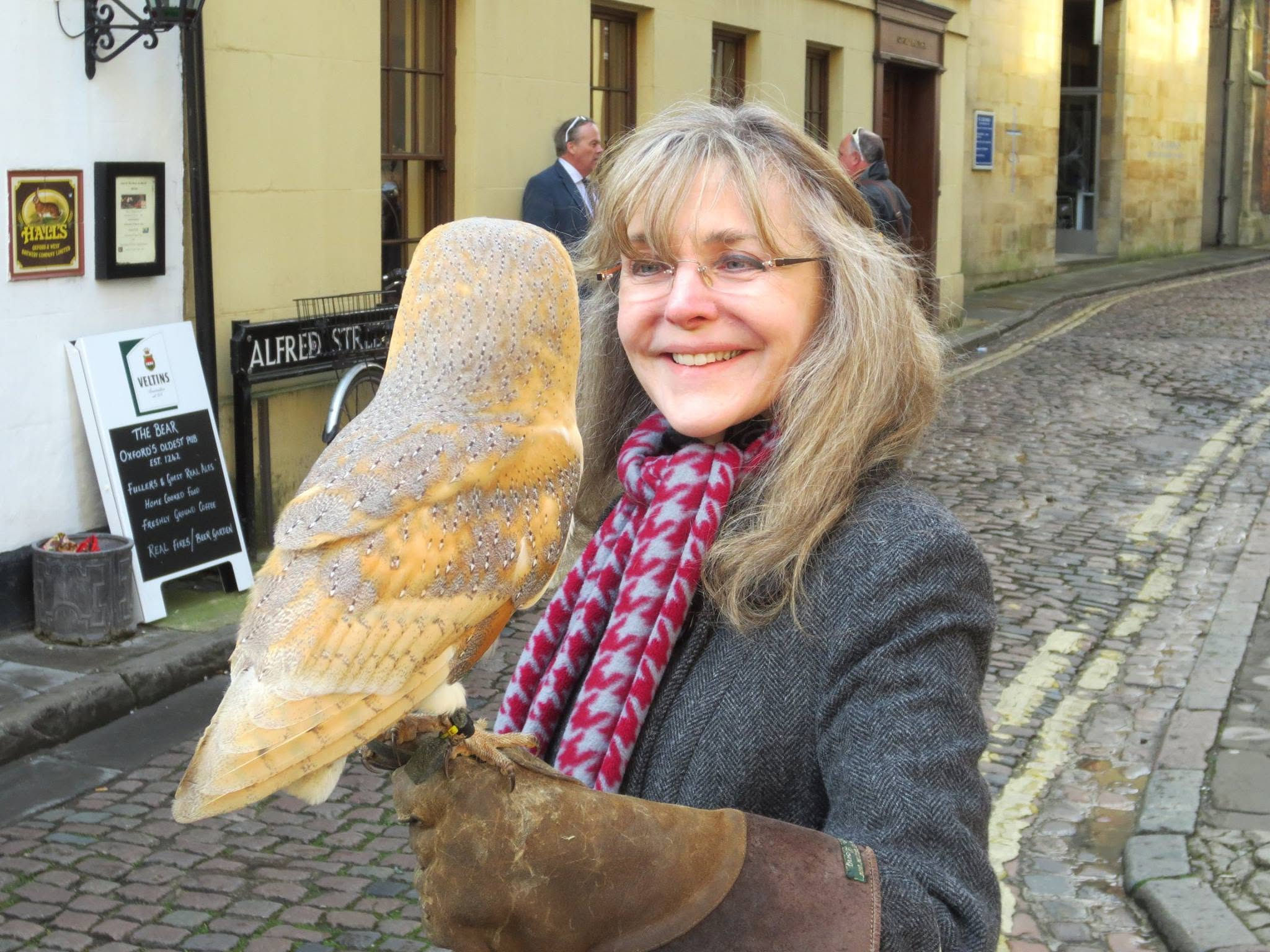
Dr. Eva Dadlez gets acquainted with an owl.

E. M. Dadlez is an American philosopher and professor emerita of philosophy at the University of Central Oklahoma. She is known for her work on aesthetics, ethics, and the philosophy of literature, particularly her research on the moral and emotional dimensions of fictional experience.

== Books ==
- What's Hecuba to Him? Fictional Events and Actual Emotions. (Penn State University Press, 1997)
- Mirrors to One Another: Emotion and Value in Jane Austen and David Hume. (Wiley-Blackwell, 2009)
- Jane Austen’s Emma: Philosophical Perspectives (edited collection). (Oxford University Press, Oxford Studies in Philosophy and Literature series, November 2018.)

== Articles, Book Chapters, Fiction, Conferences and Lectures ==
Dadlez has written more than 50 articles that have been published in a range of academic journals. In addition, she has written nearly two dozen book chapters and has also published fiction in Jupiter's Eye and Tales From the Wood: Stories in the Key of Tull, Volume 2. She has presented more than 200 papers and lectures at conferences throughout the world.
