= Mabel Ballin =

American actress

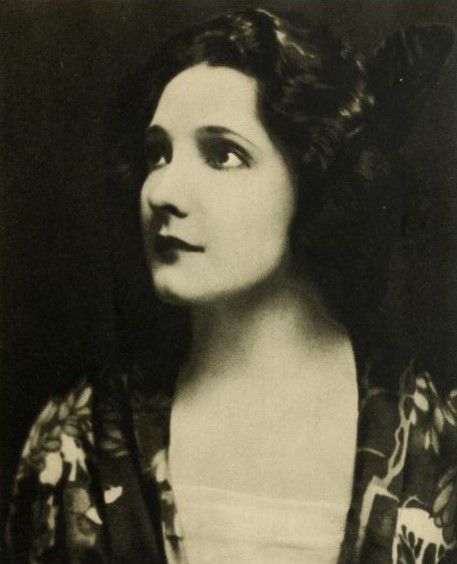
- Stars of the Photoplay, 1924
- Born: Mabel Croft; January 1, 1885; Philadelphia, Pennsylvania, U.S.
- Died: July 24, 1958 (aged 73); Santa Monica, California, U.S.
- Resting place: Woodlawn Memorial Cemetery
- Years active: 1917–1925
- Spouse: Hugo Ballin (m. 1909; died 1956)

Mabel Ballin (née Croft; January 1, 1885 – July 24, 1958), was an American motion-picture actress of the silent film era.

== Early life and career ==
Mabel Croft was born in Philadelphia, Pennsylvania, on January 1, 1885. Some sources give 1887 as her birthdate. Both of Croft's parents died when she was 2 years old, which resulted in her being raised by her grandfather and social worker grandmother.

Mabel Croft's first stage experience was at Salvation Army hall, where she played the tambourine to bring in donations. Raised in poverty, Croft was working as a dressmaker when a customer paid for her tuition to an industrial arts school. Croft never graduated, instead moving to New York to pursue a career in acting.

She married painter and director Hugo Ballin on October 24, 1909, in Westport, Connecticut, and together they founded Ballin Independent Company.

Ballin appeared in 28 films between 1917 and 1925. She achieved popularity during World War I. She is best known for her role in Riders of the Purple Sage (1925). Other notable films she appeared in include The Glorious Adventure (1918), Jane Eyre (1921), and Vanity Fair (1923), in which she portrayed Becky Sharp.

== Death ==
Mabel Ballin died on July 24, 1958, in Santa Monica, California. She was interred in Woodlawn Memorial Cemetery in Santa Monica with her husband.

== Filmography ==
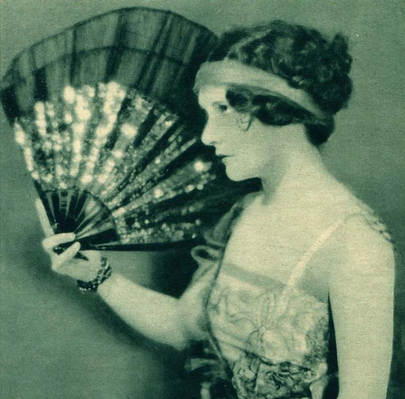
Ballin, 1923

- When Bobby Broke His Arm (1917)
- Bobby, Movie Director (1917)
- Bobby, Boy Scout (1917)
- Bobby's Bravery (1917)
- The Spreading Dawn (1917) *Lost film, only a fragment survives
- For Valour (1917)
- The Service Star (1918) *Lost film
- The Glorious Adventure (1918) *Lost film
- The Turn of the Wheel (1918) *Lost film
- Laughing Bill Hyde (1918) *Lost film
- The Danger Game (1918)
- The White Heather (1919)
- Lord and Lady Algy (1919) *Lost film
- The Illustrious Prince (1919)
- The Quickening Flame (1919)
- Under Crimson Skies (1920)
- Pagan Love (1920)
- Jane Eyre (1921)
- East Lynne (1921)
- The Journey's End (1921)
- Screen Snapshots, Series 1, No. 24 (1921)
- Screen Snapshots, Series 3, No. 9 (1922)
- Other Women's Clothes (1922)
- Married People (1922)
- Souls for Sale (1923)
- Vanity Fair (1923) *Lost film
- Screen Snapshots, Series 4, No. 10 (1924)
- Riders of the Purple Sage (1925)
- Code of the West (1925) *Lost film
- Barriers Burned Away (1925)
- Beauty and the Bad Man (1925)
- The Shining Adventure (1925)
- The Rainbow Trail (1925)
- Screen Snapshots, Series 5, No. 14 (1925)
