= The Glorious Adventure (1918 film) =

1918 film

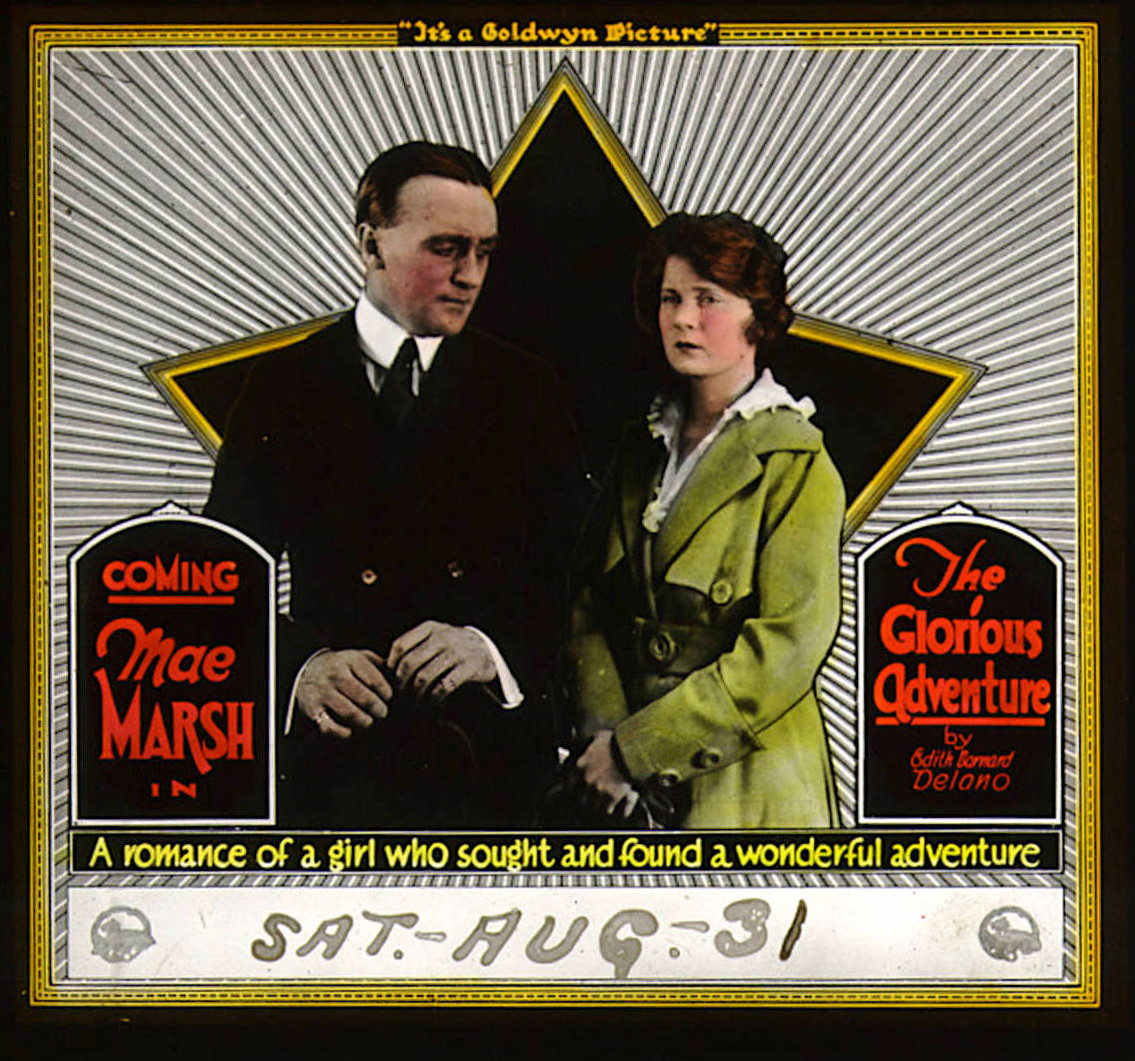
- Lantern slide
- Directed by: Hobart Henley
- Written by: Edith Barnard Delano
- Produced by: Samuel Goldwyn
- Starring: Mae Marsh; Wyndham Standing; Alec B. Francis; Mammy Lou; Mabel Ballin
- Cinematography: J.C. Bitzer
- Distributed by: Goldwyn Pictures
- Release date: July 14, 1918
- Running time: 80 minutes
- Country: United States
- Language: Silent (English intertitles)

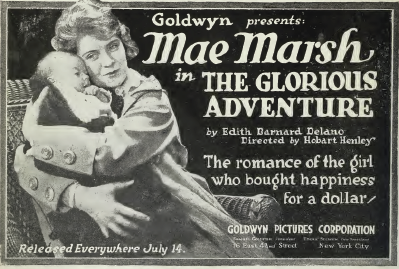
Advertisement

The Glorious Adventure is a lost 1918 American silent drama film directed by Hobart Henley.

== Plot ==
As described in a film magazine, at the death of her aunt Carey Wethersbee (Marsh) decides to go visiting. In a distant town she decides to make the home of Hiram A. Ward (Standing), wealthy mill owner, her stopping place. That Mr. Ward is not pleased is evidenced in his every action towards her, but finally he comes to regard the young woman as a pleasure, and before long he falls in love with her. Because of his cruel treatment of his employees, Carey does not glory in his proposal and, after his factory has been blown up and he seeks to prosecute an innocent man, Carey returns to her home. Shortly after, Hiram, realizing that Carey is right, adjusts his methods of dealing with his people and goes to Carey to explain everything and to win her heart.

== Cast ==
- Mae Marsh as Carey Wethersbee
- Wyndham Standing as Hiram A. Ward
- Sara Alexander as Lucretia Wethersbee, Carey's Aunt
- Paul Stanton as Bob Williamson
- Alec B. Francis as Scott, The Butler
- Mabel Ballin as Lucretia, A Girl
- A. Voorhees Wood as Cabman
- Ivan Christy as Joe
- Mammy Lou as Old Servant
- Gladys Wilson as Undetermined Role
- Irene Blackwell as Undetermined Role

== Production ==
The film was directed by Hobart Henley, and starred Mae Marsh and Wyndham Standing. The film also featured an elderly black woman, Mammy Lou, who claimed to be 114 years old at the time of filming. Art direction for the film was by Hugo Ballin.

The film was produced by Samuel Goldwyn, based on the short story "When Carey Came to Town" by Edith Barnard Delano, and released by Goldwyn Pictures. The film was filmed partly on location at the Hermitage Plantation in Savannah, Georgia.

This film is not to be confused with another film of the same title, directed in England in 1922 by J. Stuart Blackton in the Prizmacolor process. Neither film is related to the famous book The Glorious Adventure (1927) by Richard Halliburton.

== Preservation status ==
A print existed in MGM's Vault #7, but was destroyed by a fire in 1965.

== See also ==
- List of lost films
