= Yellow dog =

Yellow dog may refer to:

== Animals ==
- Yellow Dog or Carolina Dog, wild dog variety in the southern United States
- Nureongi, a Korean dog
- A dog of any breed with a yellow coat of fur

== Literature ==
- Old Yeller, novel about a yellow dog
- Yellow Dog (novel), 2003 novel by Martin Amis
- Yellow Dog (comics), an underground comix
- Yellow Dog, a fictional dog from the Blinky comic strip in The Dandy
- "The Yellow Dog", an anti-sedition story by Henry Irving Dodge

== Music ==
- Yellow Dog (album), a 2007 album by Greg Brown
- Yellow Dog (band), 1970s band, who charted in the UK with "Just One More Night"
- Yellow Dog (bootlegger), publisher of bootleg records
- Yellow Dog Records, a Memphis music label named after the railroad
- The Yellow Dogs, rock band from Tehran, Iran

== Other uses ==
- Yellow Dog (Variety), a Swedish variety show by Hasseåtage
- Yellow Dog, ring name of professional wrestler Brian Pillman
- Yellow dog, a Ku Klux Klan hazing ritual

== See also ==
- Anti-Yellow Dog Club, American anti-seditionist groups during World War I
- The Yellow Dog
- Yellow-dog contract, an agreement between an employer and an employee regarding labor unions
- Yellow dog Democrats, American political term for Democratic voters in Southern states; also called "Yaller Dog"
- Yellow Dog Linux, Linux distribution by Terra Soft Solutions
- Yellow Dog Railroad, a common blues nickname for the Yazoo & Mississippi Valley Railroad, located in the Mississippi Delta
