= Jeju dog =

Endangered Korean dog breed

Jeju Dog
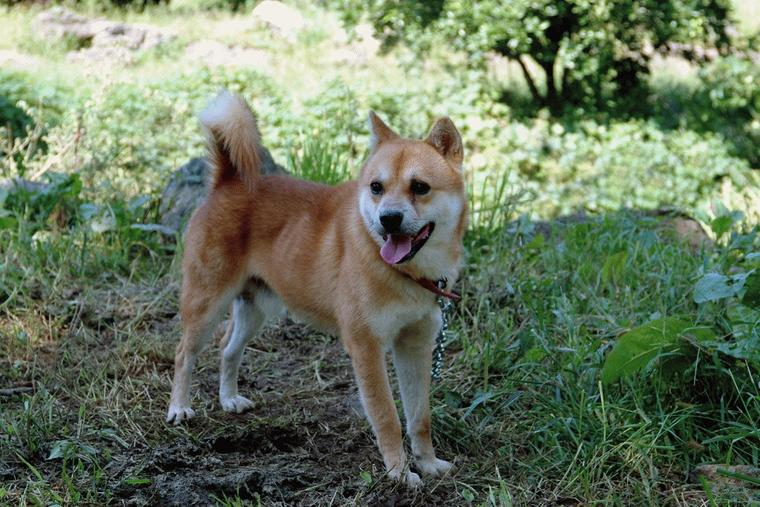
- Origin: South Korea

- Jeju dog
- Hangul: 제주개
- Hanja: 濟州犬
- RR: Jeju gae
- MR: Cheju kae

The Jeju Dog (Korean: 제주개) is a breed of dog that was brought back from the edge of extinction in 1986, when only three of them were found on the entire island of Jeju in South Korea. Since then, an aggressive campaign of breeding has yielded a current population of close to 300. However, the 'pure bred' Jeju Dog population is only estimated to be at about 69 as of September 2010.

In 2010, Korea designated the Jeju Dog as a national heritage animal, which will allow for subsequent national protection. Before this, not enough animals remained to allow for such a distinction.

Protection initiatives include a 2017 auction held by the Jeju Livestock Institute for those interested in adopting one of the 20 puppies. According to the institute, the goal was to continue to breed and preserve the Jeju Dog after being criticized for selling the puppies.

== Characteristics ==
The dog is considered the largest dog breed indigenous to Korea. The dog breed is usually 49–55 centimeter long, 12–16 kilogram in weight and has an average lifespan of 15 years. Jeju Dogs have wide and pointed foreheads. In many ways, the females look like foxes in terms of their length and width, while the males look almost identical to wolves. They are also similar to the Korean Jindo Dogs in terms of color and size. The primary difference being that Jeju Dogs have tails that are pointed up like brooms. They have tawny brown hair.

They have a reputation for being loyal guard dogs and have an acute sense of smell and hearing. They are curious and aggressive when ordered to attack a prey, making them suitable for hunting. They have been known to hunt pheasants, deer, and badgers.

== History ==
Jeju dogs may have originated in China, moved south along the peninsula, and came to Jeju Island. Who brought the animals to the island and what their original purpose was are unclear. Moreover, when Jeju Dogs were brought to South Korea, they became military dogs, and when no longer military, people often ate them, which is the primary cause of the breed being endangered. Some sources cite how the Japanese during the Korean colonization ordered the slaughter of dogs indigenous to Korea and contributed to the near-extinction of the breed.

In 2010, it was announced that there would be an effort to nominate them as a Korean national monument.

== See also ==
- List of dog breeds
- Guard dog
- Military dog
- South Korea
- Sapsali
- Jindo Dog
- Pungsan Dog
- Nureongi
