= The Yellow Dog =

The Yellow Dog may refer to:

- The Yellow Dog (novel), a novel by the Belgian writer Georges Simenon
- The Yellow Dog (1932 film), a film adaptation directed by Jean Tarride
- The Yellow Dog (1918 film), an American silent drama film
- Nickname of wrestler Brian Pillman

== See also ==
- The Yellow Dogs, an Iranian-American rock band
- Yellow dog (disambiguation)
