= Bulgae =

Dog breed in Korean mythology

Bulgae or pulgae (Korean: 불개; lit. fire dog) refers to the mythical fire dogs in Korean mythology. They come from the kingdom of darkness and always chase the Sun and Moon, causing eclipses when they bite both the celestial bodies. Bulgae are strong and fierce dogs or hairy dogs which are likely to be the indigenous Korean dog breed Sapsali, which means "ghost chasing dog".

== Myth ==
In Korean mythology, the cosmological narratives and legends such as the Isik, Wolsik legend, explain the eclipse phenomenon with the Bulgae dogs.

According to the myth recorded in the Hangug-ui seolwo (Folk Myths from Korea), there were many realms of heaven. One of them, the kingdom of darkness, was called Gamangnara, the Dark World. The king of Gamangnara was concerned and weary with the darkness and desired the light of the Sun and Moon for his kingdom. He sent one of the gigantic fiery hounds, the Bulgae, belonging to one of his dark world subjects, to chase the Sun and bring it to his realm. However, when the Bulgae tried to bite the Sun, the Sun was too hot, which made the dog unable to hold on to it, resulting in him giving up, and running back to the king. This failed attempt made the king angry since he could not have the Sun. In another attempt to get rid of the darkness he sent another more ruthless dog to steal the Moon. When the Bulgae tried to carry the Moon in its mouth, the Moon was so cold, that the mouth of the dog was icy and frozen, and caused the Bulgae to drop the Moon from its mouth. The Bulgae tried many times and many different ways to grab the Moon in its mouth, but eventually also gave up and ran back to the king in disappointment. The king never gave up this mission though. He continued to send fire dogs that were fiercer than the others, but none were able to collect the Sun and Moon. According to the Korean eclipse belief, during a solar eclipse or lunar eclipse, the dark sections are the parts where the dogs are biting. When the eclipses are over, the dogs have given up and run away back to Gamangnara.

== Dog breed ==
In South Korea, in the Daegu-Gyeongbuk province, an ancient, nearly extinct breed of dog is called Bulgae. The name of this breed refers to its resemblance of the mythical dog beasts, with its completely reddish-maroon coat and nails, amber-colored nose and amber-colored eyes. The dog looks very much like the Jindo spitz dog breed, with the curled bushy tail and pointy ears, just with the exception of the deep maroon coat. The looks are archaic and suggest some relation to Jindos and Inu Shibas. The average height of Bulgae would be 50–55 cm at the withers and average weight ranging from 15 to 25 kg. In the 1990s, this dog breed was threatened by extinction due to the Korean dog meat cuisine. In 2012, the breed was saved from complete annihilation by the efforts of Dongyang University, researching and rebreeding the 20 last individual dogs. On June 30, 2024, Jeongeup Boolgae (정읍 불개) was registered as a native resource in the Food and Agriculture Organization's Domestic Animal Diversity Information System (DAD-IS).

== See also ==
- Fenrir, the wolf of Norse mythology whose sons Sköll and Hati Hróðvitnisson swallow the Sun and Moon during Ragnarök
- Hellhound
- Tengu (Japan)
- Tiangou (China)
