= Korean Jindo =

Dog breed from Jindo Island, South Korea

Jindo Dog
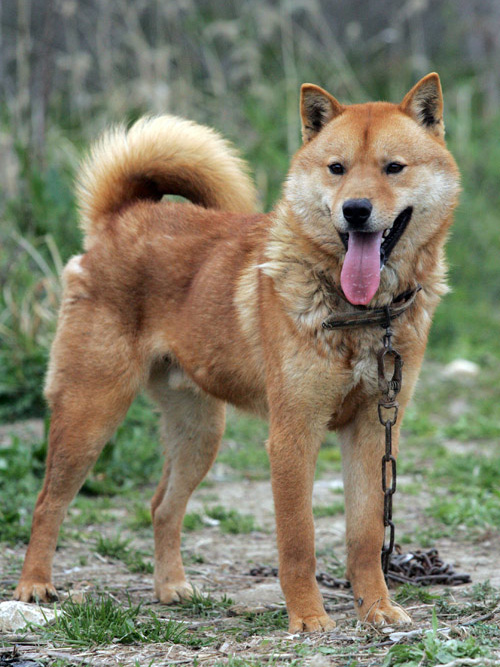
- A Jindo
- Other names: Korean Jindo; Jindo; Jindot-gae (진돗개)
- Origin: Jindo Island, South Korea
Traits
Height	Males	50–55 cm (20–22 in)
	Females	45–50 cm (18–20 in)
Weight	Males	18–23 kg (40–51 lb)
	Females	15–19 kg (33–42 lb)
- Coat: Double coat of medium length. The outer coat is harsh, straight, and stands somewhat away from the body. The undercoat is soft.
- Color: red fawn, white, black, black and tan, wolf grey, and brindle. The undercoat is light in color.
Kennel club standards
- Korean Kennel Federation: standard
- Fédération Cynologique Internationale: standard

- Korean Jindo
- Hangul: 진돗개; 진도견
- Hanja: 珍島개; 珍島犬
- RR: Jindotgae; Jindogyeon
- MR: Chindokkae; Chindogyŏn

The Jindo dog (Korean: 진돗개) is an indigenous dog native to the island of Jindo in South Korea. It is also known as Jindo-gyeon (진도견) and formerly known as the Chindo dog.

It is one of South Korea's Natural Monuments, having been designated Natural Monument No. 53 in 1962. It has a reputation for being loyal and good at tracking things. Due to its protected status within South Korea, only dogs born on Jindo Island can be officially registered as a Jindo by the Government of South Korea after an inspection. The dog was registered as a breed by the United Kennel Club on January 1, 1998 and by the Fédération Cynologique Internationale in 2005.

The pronunciation (Jindo-gae) also means an official term for warning measures issued in the event of a localized threat situation.

== Description ==
=== Appearance ===
Jindos are double-coated spitz-type dogs. The keen and alert appearance of the Jindo gives the impression of intelligence, strength, loyalty, and agility. Other features include forward-pointing upright ears.

==== Body ====
Korean Jindo owners have traditionally divided Jindos into two body types:

- Tonggol or Gyeopgae: This type is more muscular and stocky with the Korean National Dog Association (KNDA) recognizing an equal proportion of height at the withers to length (10:10). The depth of chest is approximately equal to one-half the height at the withers. The loin is also typically shorter.
- Hudu or Hotgae: This type is more slender with a somewhat less depth of chest and a slightly longer loin. Moreover, other physical features tend to have an increased length, such as the ears, muzzle, and head. This results in an appearance that is longer than tall with the KNDA recommending a height at the withers to length ratio of 10:11.

The KNDA also recognizes a third body type called Gakgol which is a gradually emerging combination of the two traditional types, retaining the length of body of the Hudu and the depth of chest of the Tonggol.

In regards to the Jindo's body appearance, the United Kennel Club currently states, "The squarely built Jindo has a chest that is moderately deep but not too broad. At its deepest point the chest reaches to, or just above, the elbow. The brisket is well developed and the ribs are well sprung. The back is strong and straight and the loin is well muscled, taut, lean and narrower than the ribcage. There is considerable tuck up."

==== Color ====
Jindos come in six colors:

- White (baekgu/백구) - This color is actually an off-white or ivory shade with tan or light brown around the tips of the ears, the back of the hind legs, and the tip of the tail. Some whites may have a subtle tan stripe running from the head, down the top line, to the tail.
- Fawn (hwanggu/황구) - The color of well-ripened wheat.
- Wolf Grey (jaegu/재구) - This coat looks gray from a distance but is actually made up of individual white, black, and fawn colored hairs.
- Black and tan (nenunbagi/네눈박이, meaning four-eyes; or black-tan/블랙탄) - Black with tan on the muzzle, legs, and paws, and an eye-shaped tan spot over each eye.
- Brindle (hogu/호구) - Also known as "Tiger" pattern. Thin, dark brown or black stripes like a tiger's on a fawn base. These stripes appear at an early age.
- Black (heukgu/흑구) - Solid black, very rare.

Some Jindo Island residents value black, black/red, and red/white Jindos as good hunters. The United Kennel Club recognizes six different coat colors: white, red fawn, wolf grey, black, black and tan, and brindle (tiger pattern).

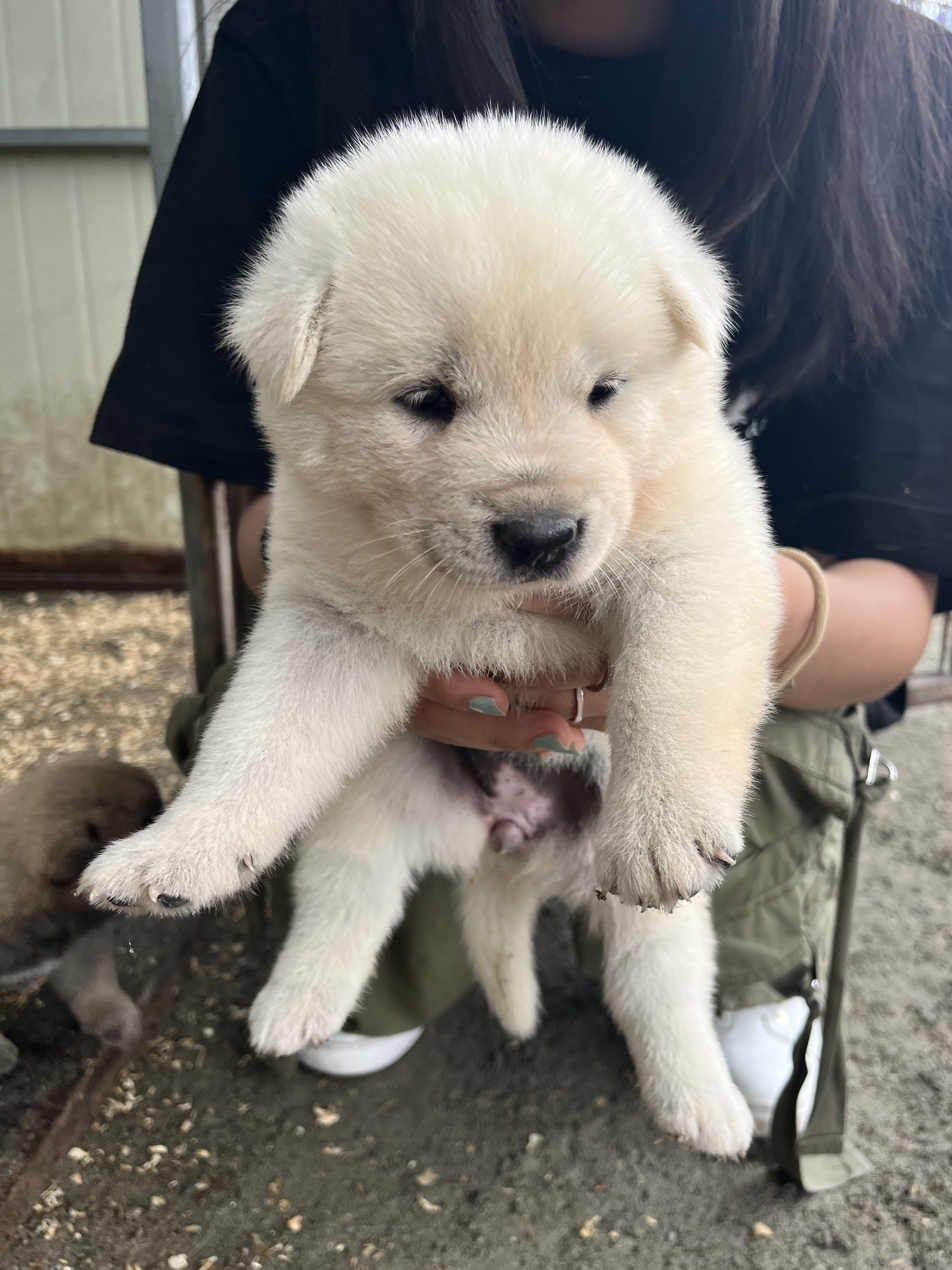
White Jindo Puppy

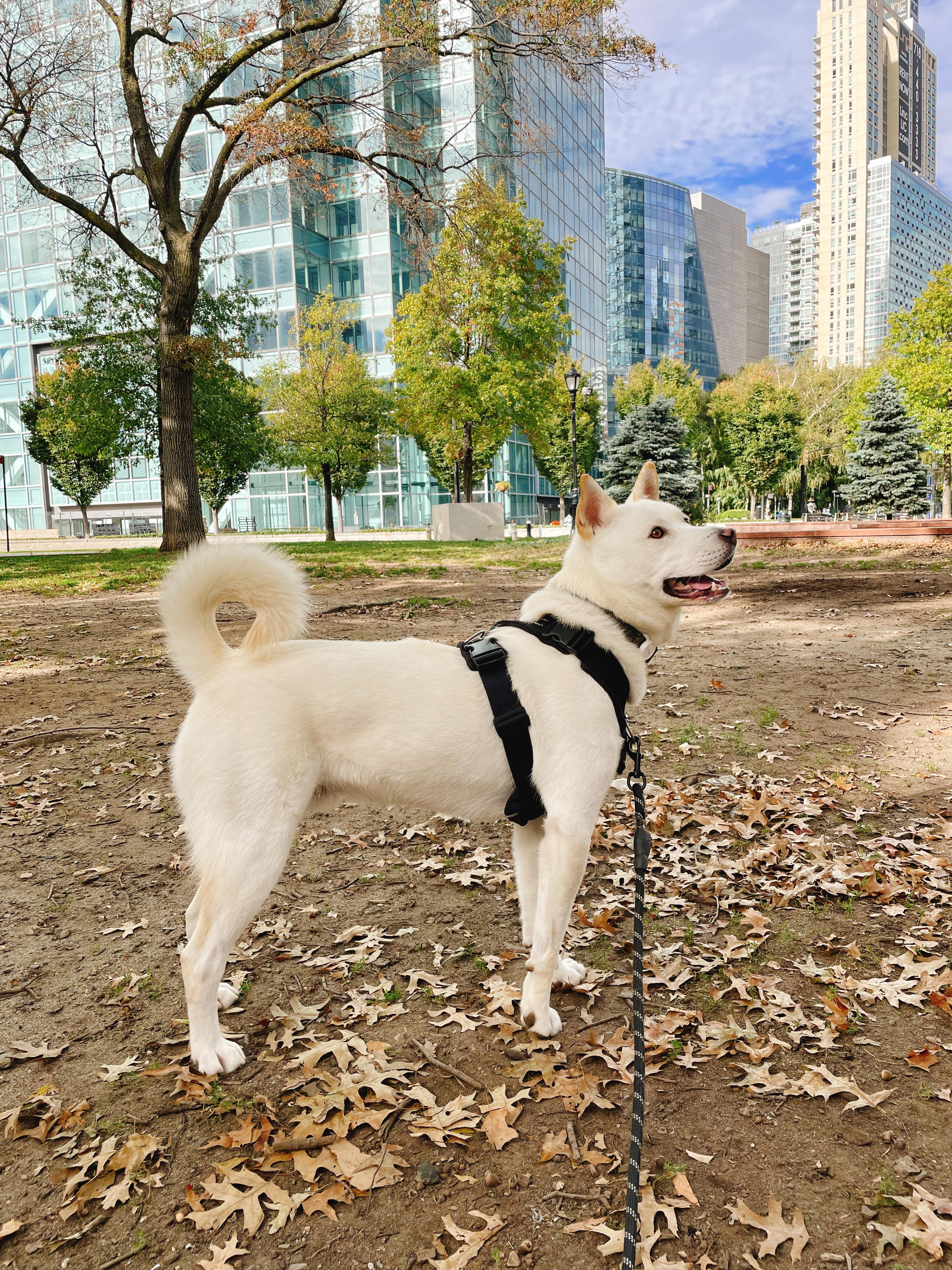
white, male Jindo

=== Feet ===
The feet are of medium size, round in shape, with thick, strong tan pads. Nails are hard and may be black, cream or gray.

=== Gait ===
- The Jindo moves with strides of moderate length.
- It is a quick, light, elastic trot which enables the Jindo to travel quickly over any terrain.
- The forelegs and hind legs are carried straight forward, with neither elbows nor stifles turned in or out.
- At a normal walking speed, the Jindo tends to lower its head.

=== Head ===
- The top skull of an adult dog should be broad and rounded between the ears and free from wrinkles.
- The under jaw is well-developed and helps give a round or octagonal shape to the head when viewed from the front. Coarse hairs stand away from the cheeks.
- The ears are triangular and upright (leaning forward past vertical), yet are unique among other spitz breeds for ears that splay out to the sides, creating a shape similar to airplane wings. The inside of the ears should be well-furred and thick cartilage is desired. Ears on puppies normally lie flat until they are past 5–6 months.
- The eyes are almond shaped. They should be a shade of dark brown. Some dogs have light brown eyes but this color is not desirable according to the Korean Jindo Dog Association. Jindos do not have blue eyes.
- The nose should be black on non-white dogs. White dogs may have flesh noses.
- The muzzle is well proportioned without being bulky. The lips should be taut and black. The preferred color for the tongue is solid pink.
- The Jindo has a complete set of evenly spaced, white teeth with a scissors bite.
- Typically, males have larger heads and females have more fox-like features.

=== Height and weight ===
Desirable height at maturity, measured at the withers, ranges from 19½ to 21 inches (or 48 to 53 cm) for males and 18½ to 20 inches (or 45 to 50 cm) for females.

Weight should be in proportion to the height, giving a well-muscled, lean appearance without being too light or too heavy. The typical weight range for a male Jindo in good condition is 40 to 60 pounds (18 to 27 kg); for a female, 35 to 55 pounds (16 to 25 kg).

=== Tail ===
The tail is thick and strong and set on at the end of the top line. The tail should be at least long enough to reach to the hock joint. The tail may be loosely curled over the back or carried over the back in a sickle position. The hair on the underside of the tail is thick, stiff, abundant, and twice as long as the coat on the shoulders, which causes the hair to fan outward when the tail is up.

== Character ==
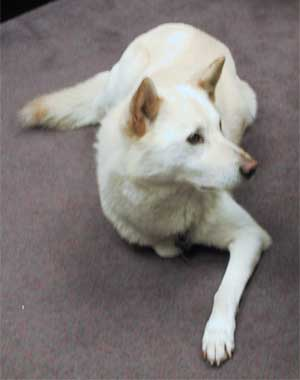
A white Jindo

Jindo dogs are well known for their loyalty and gentle nature. Since Jindo dogs are active, they need proper living space, walks, care, and attention. There is also a clear perception of family hierarchy.

They are of medium to high energy. If kept in a yard, the fencing must be at least 6 feet high due to their strong hind legs that enable them to jump high. Because Jindos are active and intelligent, they require frequent interaction with people or other dogs.

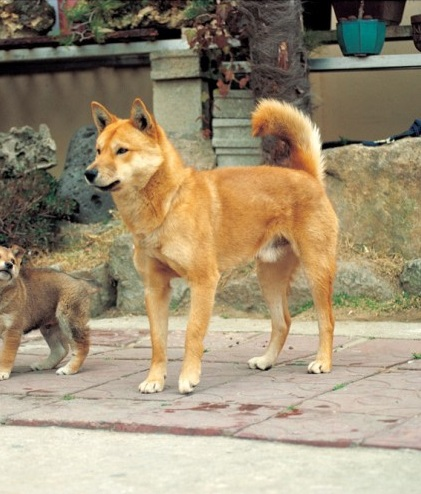
Hwanggu (English: Fawn Jindo)

=== Loyalty ===
In 1993, a 7-year-old female Jindo named Baekgu (백구; 白狗; translated as a White Dog), raised by Park Bok-dan (박복단), an 83-year-old woman on Jindo Island, was sold to a new owner in the city of Daejeon which is located about 300 km (180 mi) away from the island. The dog escaped her new home and returned to her original owner, Park, after seven months, haggard and exhausted. Baekgu remained with her original owner, who decided to keep the loyal dog, until the dog died of natural causes seven years later. The story was a national sensation in South Korea and was made into cartoons, a TV documentary, and a children's storybook. In 2004, Jindo County erected a statue of Baekgu in her hometown to honor the dog.

Another Jindo, also named Baekgu, a four-year-old male at the time who lived alone with his owner Park Wan-suh (박완서) residing on Jindo Island, did not eat anything and mourned for his dead owner for seven days after the owner died from a liver disease in June 2000. According to Chosun Ilbo, the dog accompanied his dead owner for three days until other people came to find the body, followed the owner to his funeral, and came back home, not eating anything for four days. The Korean Jindo Dog Research Institute (진돗개 시험연구소) brought him under its care, but a person related to the Institute announced that the dog would not interact with anyone except for his feeder as of 2005.

== History ==
The Jindo dog was researched by Tamezo Mori, a professor of Keijō Imperial University in February 1937 and it was registered as 53rd of Natural Treasure of the Government-General of Chōsen in May 1938.

The Jindo dog managed to survive Korea under Japanese rule between 1910 and 1945 due to Japanese biologists recognizing its similarity to Japan's native dogs, whereas other Korean dog breeds were killed by the Japanese. In 1962, the Government of South Korea designated the Jindo as the 53rd 'Natural Treasure' (or translated as 'Natural Monument') (천연기념물; 天然記念物) and was thereby protected along with all designated Natural Treasures under the Cultural Heritage Protection Act the same year. Because of the special status of the Jindo, it is very difficult to export pure Jindo Island Jindo dogs outside of Korea. Jindos marched in the opening ceremonies of the 1988 Summer Olympic Games in Seoul, Korea.

The Jindo Dogs Guild of Korea (Korean: 한국 진돗개 조합), as of 2008, issues certificates of Korean Jindo dog purity, which specifies the registered number of the mother, sex, and birth date of the dog, as well as breeder's address, and certifies that the dog is purely of Jindo Island origin.

The Jindo first appeared in the West in France, and a small number have since been introduced to the United Kingdom and the United States, both in an official capacity and by Korean immigrants. The Jindo dog as a breed was recognized by the United Kennel Club on January 1, 1998. As of 2016, there were only two registered Jindos in the U.S.: one in the Los Angeles area and one in Seattle. There were 25 registered in the United Kingdom.

=== Lineage ===
A 2020 study showed that Jindos and other East and Southeast Asian dogs share some common ancestry with the New Guinea singing dog. These dogs were shown in this same study to be more phylogenetically related to each other than to other more selectively bred dog breeds, most of which contain far greater percentages of the Modern European lineage. DNA analysis indicates another common ancestor around 900 years ago that the Donggyeongi dog and the Korean Jindo separated from.

In a 2012 genomic analysis of the Jindo dog, several mitochondrial DNA genotypes unique to the Jindo were noted. Within the same study, the Jindo's unique mitochondrial DNA genome was reflected in its similarities to other dogs but distinctive branch on the mapped canine phylogenetic tree.

In 2025, a genomic analysis indicates that the black and tan coat colour originates from the original population founded on Jindo Island, which is in accord with the breed history. The Jindo shared haplotypes with the Japanese Akita, indicating a shared ancestry through an early migration of people and dogs from Korea to Japan. The Jindo also showed haplotype sharing with West Eurasian breeds such as the German Shepherd, due to the gene flow of West Eurasian dogs to the Tibetan Plateau around 3,600 years ago.

=== Kennel club recognition ===
Internationally, the Jindo is fully recognized by the Fédération Cynologique Internationale and the United Kennel Club. It is under the Foundation Stock Service in the American Kennel Club, which is the first step in achieving recognition, and in the Import category of the Kennel Club. In their country of origin, they are recognized by the Korean Kennel Federation, Korean Kennel Club, and Jindo specialty shows are held seasonally by local Jindo clubs.

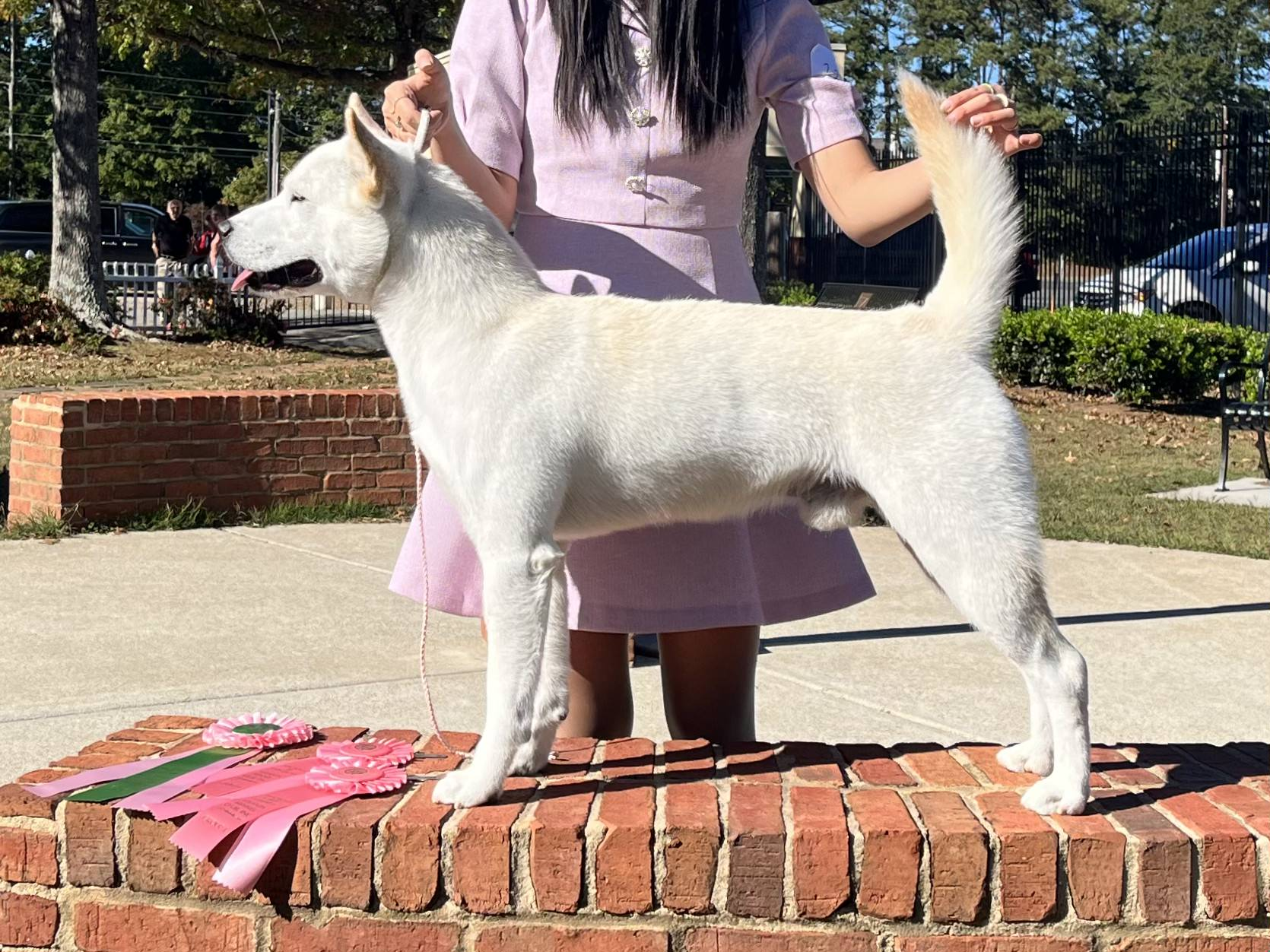
A white Jindo posed for an award at an American Kennel Club event.

== Human utilization of Jindos ==
Naturally having a strong prey drive, Jindo dogs were traditionally utilized by the various inhabitants of Jindo (island) for hunting game animals, including water deer and wild boar. In more modern times, the Jindo dog is usually kept by humans as a loyal canine companion and guard dog. The Korean Army is known to use Jindos as guard dogs at major bases. Furthermore, Jindos are instinctively wary of strangers and do not take food from anyone other than their owners.

In a 2009 interview with Korea Economic Daily (한국경제), Park Nam-sun (박남순), an expert search dog handler in South Korea, testified that Jindo dogs are not fit as rescue dogs and search dogs. It is because Jindo dogs' hunting instincts are too strong (they can forget their mission because of their hunting instincts), and they usually give their loyalty only to the first owner, while handlers of search dogs and rescue dogs can frequently change.

In 2010, Son Min-suk (손민석), a member of the Korean Security Forum, wrote that most Korean military dogs were German Shepherds, and that Jindo dogs were not fit for military dogs as they were highly likely to escape their duties to find their first handlers, who might have been discharged from military services, or to come back to their original home.

However, efforts to train Jindo dogs as search and rescue dogs continue. In October 2010, the Los Angeles Police Department announced their intent to evaluate the Jindo dog breed for law enforcement service, specifically for patrol and detection service. Four selected Jindo puppies would be distributed to LAPD and Glendale California Police Department to be trained as K9 units. After a year of trying, the trainers found that the dogs did not have the right disposition for police work because they were too easily distracted and too eager to please their masters.

== See also ==
- Bulgae
- Donggyeongi
- Jeju dog
- Nureongi
- Pungsan dog
- Sapsali
- Dog of Osu
- List of dog breeds
- List of dogs noted for being faithful after their master's death
