= Pungsan dog =

Korean dog breed

Pungsan
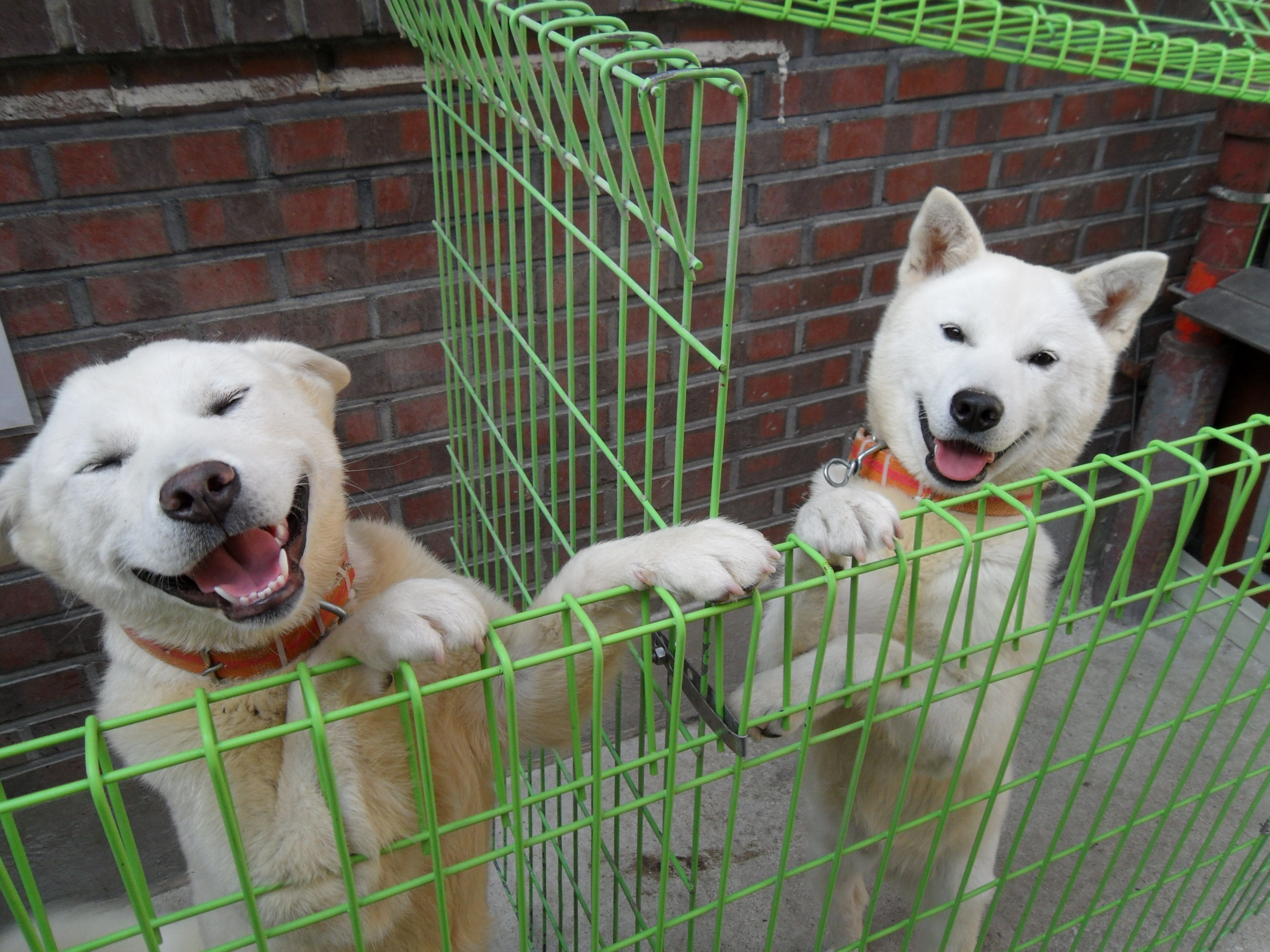
- Pungsan dogs
- Other names: Phungsan (official English name in North Korea); Pungsangae (South Korean revised romanization); Poongsan
- Origin: former Phungsan county, Ryanggang-do, North Korea
- Breed status: Not recognized as a breed by any major kennel club.
Traits
Height	Males	60–65 cm (24–26 in)
	Females	50–60 cm (20–24 in)
- Weight: 20–30 kg (44–66 lb)

- Pungsan dog
- Hangul: 풍산개
- Hanja: 豐山개
- RR: Pungsangae
- MR: P'ungsan'gae

The Pungsan dog (Korean: 풍산개) is a breed of hunting dog from Korea, named for originating in Kimhyonggwon County, formerly Pungsan County. They are also called Phungsan, Korean Phungsan, or Poongsan dogs.

They were bred in the Kaema highlands of what is now North Korea, and were traditionally used as hunting dogs. The dog is a rare breed, and is sometimes smuggled over the North Korea–China border. The dog was made a national monument of North Korea in April 1956, and the national dog of the DPRK in 2014.

== Characteristics ==
According to an ancient story, it has been passed down from generation to generation that if you release three Poongsan dogs, you can catch a tiger. This story most likely left a strong impression on people, suggesting the resilience and bravery of Poongsan dogs. A similar story goes to Jindo dogs. Of course, the claim that several Poongsan dogs can catch tigers is likely exaggerated.

The Pungsan dog is exceptional as a hunting dog, possessing remarkable perseverance and patience. They are known to restrain the prey while waiting for the hunter to come and finish it off.

Above all, the Pungsan dog, being bred in mountainous regions, possesses strong physical endurance and high resistance to cold and diseases. Both its innate disposition and physical condition make it well-suited to be a hunting dog. However, conversely, it is renowned for its noble temperament, akin to a scholar. Unlike other aggressive dogs that cannot conceal their aggression and may attack their owners or passersby indiscriminately, the Pungsan dog is generally very gentle and does not attack weaker individuals recklessly. It is said that they rarely bark or engage in fights without reason. Ultimately, while they tenaciously pursue their prey using their instincts and temperament during hunting, in daily life, they are very well-mannered and loyal to their owners.

== Breed ==
According to NK News, international kennel clubs consider Pungsan dogs as "little more than a local Spitz-type variant of Siberian huskies, only less physically impressive and with behavioral issues".

== History ==
According to the Encyclopedia of Korean Culture by the Academy of Korean Studies under the Ministry of Education, Science and Technology (South Korea) of the South Korean government, the Pungsan dog was first recognized as a national symbol in the Korean peninsula during the Japanese colonial period. The breed was also used in Russia to hunt tigers, bears, and boars. The Pungsan dog breed was bred for a long time in isolation from other provinces.

During the 2000 inter-Korean summit, North Korean leader Kim Jong-il made a gift of two Pungsan dogs (associated with the North) to South Korean president Kim Dae-jung. In return, Kim Dae-jung gave two Jindo dogs (associated with the South) to Kim Jong-il. Born at the Pyongyang Central Zoo, the Pungsan dogs were originally named Dangyol (Unity) and Jaju (Independence), but were later renamed Uri (meaning We) and Duri (Two). They initially lived in the Blue House, the residence of the South Korean president, before being moved to the Seoul Zoo, where they gave birth to 15 puppies before both dying at age 13. During their lives, the dogs were accorded special status as guests of the state.

At the Pyongyang summit in 2018, North Korean leader Kim Jong-un gave two Pungsan dogs to South Korean President Moon Jae-in. The male was named Songkang, and the female was named Gomi. Gomi gave birth to six puppies within two months of the summit, leading Moon to remark that she must have been pregnant when she was given to him. He later published photos of them at the Blue House on November 25, 2018, and labeled them as "peace gift" puppies.

In June 2024, Two seemingly adult Pungsan dogs were given to Russian President Vladimir Putin by Kim Jong-un on a visit Putin made to Pyongyang. This shows the growing view among international diplomats that canines represent a suitable gift for the Russian head of state. However, Vladimir Putin has rejected these gifts on occasion, making Kim Jong-Un's gift especially significant for the geopolitical relationship between Russia and North Korea since he accepted the gift.

== Culture ==
The dog was promoted as a national symbol in the 2010 children's animated film, Story of the Pungsan Dog, and in Paek Myeong Kil's 2017 novel, Pungsan Dogs. Dog shows are held specifically for this breed.

== See also ==
- Pet culture in North Korea
- List of dog breeds
- Korean Jindo
- Donggyeongi
- Nureongi
- Sapsali
- North Korea–South Korea relations
