= The Thirteenth Juror =

1927 film

- Theatrical release poster
- Directed by: Edward Laemmle
- Screenplay by: Charles Logue; Walter Anthony
- Based on: Counsel for the Defense by Henry Irving Dodge
- Starring: Anna Q. Nilsson; Francis X. Bushman; Walter Pidgeon; Martha Mattox; Sidney Bracey; Sailor Sharkey
- Cinematography: Ben F. Reynolds
- Production company: Universal Pictures
- Distributed by: Universal Pictures
- Release date: November 13, 1927
- Running time: 60 minutes
- Country: United States
- Language: Silent (English intertitles)

The Thirteenth Juror is a 1927 American silent mystery film directed by Edward Laemmle and written by Charles Logue and Walter Anthony. It is based on the 1908 play Counsel for the Defense by Henry Irving Dodge. The film stars Anna Q. Nilsson, Francis X. Bushman, Walter Pidgeon, Martha Mattox, Sidney Bracey and Sailor Sharkey. The film was released on November 13, 1927, by Universal Pictures.

== Cast ==
- Anna Q. Nilsson as Helen Marsden
- Francis X. Bushman as Henry Desmond
- Walter Pidgeon as Richard Marsden
- Martha Mattox as The Housekeeper
- Sidney Bracey as The Butler
- Sailor Sharkey as The Prisoner
- Lloyd Whitlock as The District Attorney
- George Siegmann as The Politician, George Quinn
- Fred Kelsey as The Detective

== Preservation ==
A 16 mm print of The Thirteenth Juror is in a private collection.
