= Skinner's Dress Suit (1926 film) =

1926 comedy film by William A. Seiter

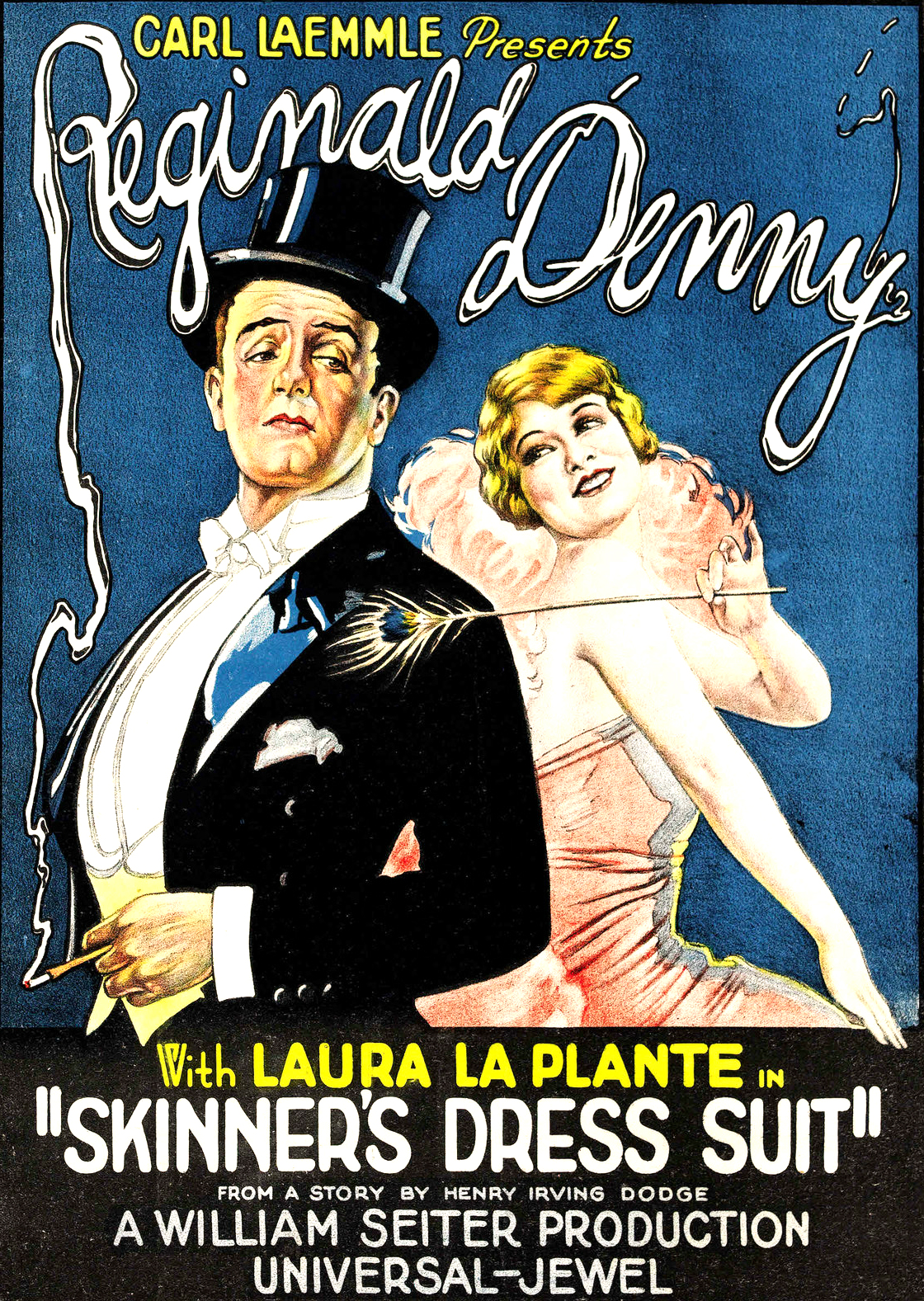
- Theatrical release poster
- Directed by: William A. Seiter
- Written by: Rex Taylor (scenario); Walter Anthony (intertitles)
- Based on: Skinner's Dress Suit by Henry Irving Dodge
- Produced by: Carl Laemmle
- Starring: Reginald Denny; Laura La Plante; Hedda Hopper
- Cinematography: Arthur L. Todd
- Edited by: J. R. Rawlins
- Distributed by: Universal Pictures
- Release date: April 18, 1926
- Running time: 7 reels
- Country: United States
- Language: Silent (English intertitles)

Skinner's Dress Suit is a 1926 American silent comedy film produced and distributed by Universal Pictures and starring Reginald Denny. William A. Seiter was the director of the film which was based on the 1916 novel of the name by Henry Irving Dodge. Laura La Plante and Hedda Hopper co-star in this comedy which has seen video and DVD releases.

Skinner's Dress Suit (1926)

A previous silent film based on this story had been made in 1917 directed by Harry Beaumont for the Essanay Company.

== Plot ==
As described in a review in a film magazine, Honey idolizes her husband Skinner and makes him demand a raise which is refused as Jackson, the biggest customer, has withdrawn his business. Honey has already told friends about the raise and Skinner has not the heart to tell her the truth. She starts spending the "raise" by making him buy a dress suit made by a tailor. This new suit opens the way to social triumph which, of course, means more spending. At work, the plodding Skinner is starting to blossom out and has the stenographer teach him the Charleston and gets caught by the boss. As the bills begin coming due, Skinner is fired but before he has a chance to tell Honey, she whisks him off to a society dance at a swell hotel. Jackson is stopping at the hotel and his pampered wife insists she wants to go to the dance and that he must get someone to invite them. He finally picks on Skinner to obtain his invitation. Skinner and Honey's social triumph comes when they teach the jazzy steps of the Charleston to the village "society swells," and soon an assortment of people are lined up trying bravely to master the intricacies of the dance. Before the evening is over, Skinner has landed the big Johnson contract. The next morning his ex-bosses are camping on Skinner's trail begging him to come back as a partner in the firm, and he pretends that he must give his bosses' offer due deliberation.

== Cast ==
- Reginald Denny as Skinner
- Laura La Plante as Mrs. Honey Skinner
- Ben Hendricks Jr. as Perkins
- E. J. Ratcliffe as McLaughlin
- Arthur Lake as Tommy
- Hedda Hopper as Mrs. Colby
- Lionel Braham as Jackson
- Frona Hale as Mrs. McLaughlin
- William H. Strauss as Tailor
- Betty Morrissey as Miss Smith
- Lucille De Nevers as Mrs. Crawford
- Lucille Ward as Mrs. Jackson
- Lila Leslie as Mrs. Wilkins
- Broderick O'Farrell as Mr. Wilkins
- Henry A. Barrows as Samuel Colby (uncredited)
- Minta Durfee as Party Guest (uncredited)
- Adolph Faylauer as Party Guest (uncredited)
- Janet Gaynor as Party Guest (uncredited)
- Betsy Lee as Party Guest (uncredited)
- George F. Marion as Old Man on Bench (uncredited)
- Grady Sutton as Party Guest (uncredited)
- Ellinor Vanderveer as Party Guest (uncredited)
