= A Trick of Hearts =

1928 film

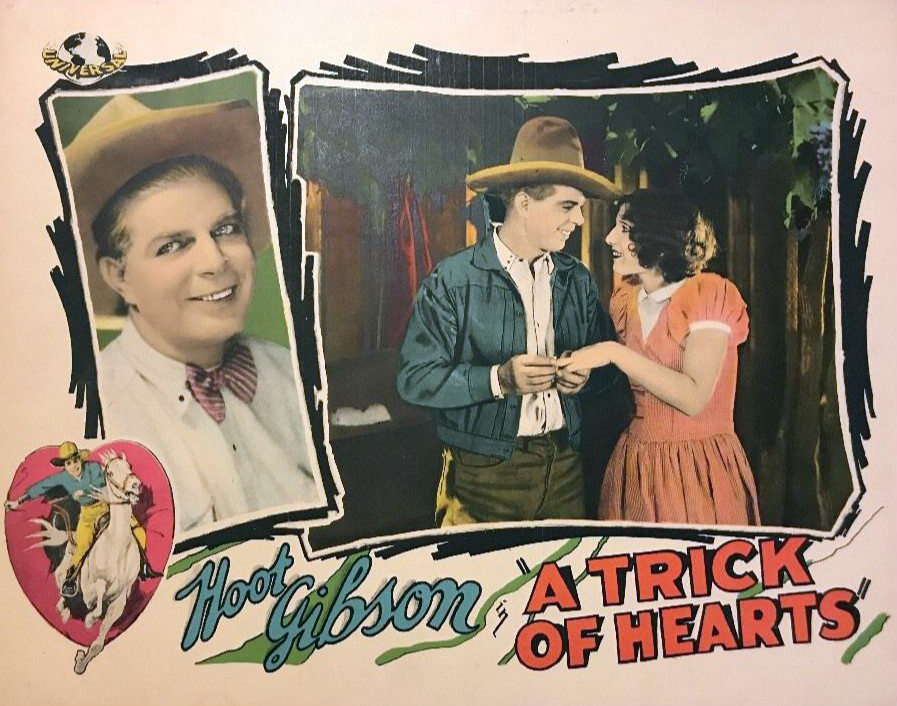
- Lobby card
- Directed by: B. Reeves Eason
- Written by: Arthur Statter; Tom Reed
- Story by: Henry Irving Dodge
- Produced by: Carl Laemmle
- Starring: Hoot Gibson
- Cinematography: Harry Neumann
- Edited by: M.C. Dewar
- Distributed by: Universal Pictures
- Release date: March 18, 1928
- Running time: 60 minutes
- Country: United States
- Languages: Silent; English intertitles

A Trick of Hearts is a 1928 American silent Western film directed by B. Reeves Eason and starring Hoot Gibson. It was produced and distributed by Universal Pictures.

== Plot ==
Carrie Patience has been elected as the new town sheriff. In order to discredit the new sheriff, Ben Tully begins staging phony robberies while disguised as a woman. Black Jack kidnaps Ben's girlfriend, Connie Meade.

== Cast ==
- Hoot Gibson as Benjamin Franklin Tully
- Georgia Hale as Connie Meade
- Joe Rickson as Black Jack
- Rosa Gore as Sheriff Carrie Patience
- Howard Truesdale as Dad Tully
- Heinie Conklin as Blackface Comic
- George Ovey as Whiteface Comic
- Nora Cecil as The Mayor
- Dan Crimmins as The Ex Sheriff
- Grace Cunard as The Constable

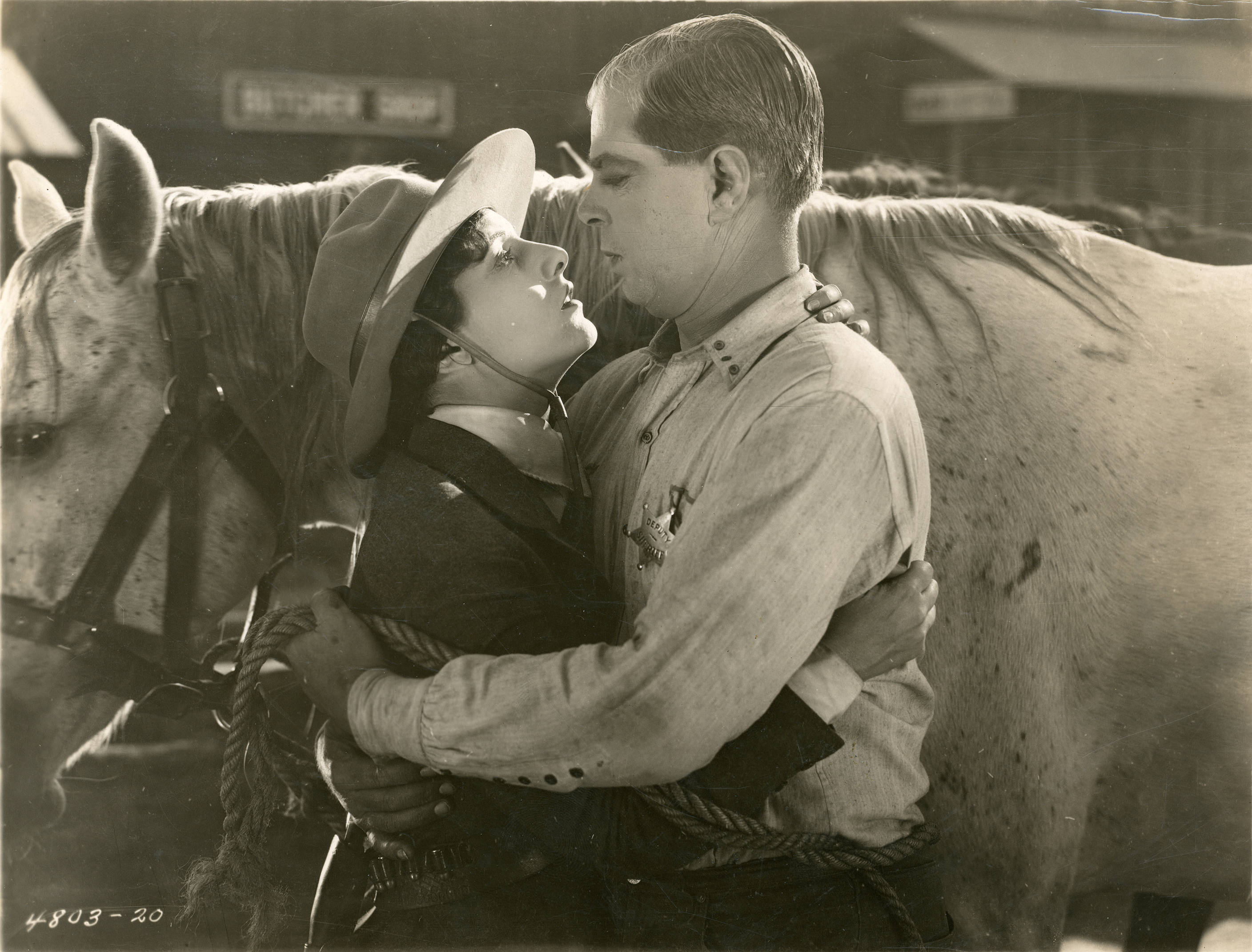
Still from the movie

== Censorship ==
Before A Trick of Hearts could be exhibited in Kansas, the Kansas Board of Review required the removal of the scene where someone thumbed their nose and the "diaper episode."

== Preservation ==
With no prints of A Trick of Hearts located in any film archives, it is a lost film.

== See also ==
- Hoot Gibson filmography
