= Donggyeongi =

Korean dog breed

Donggyeongi (동경이)
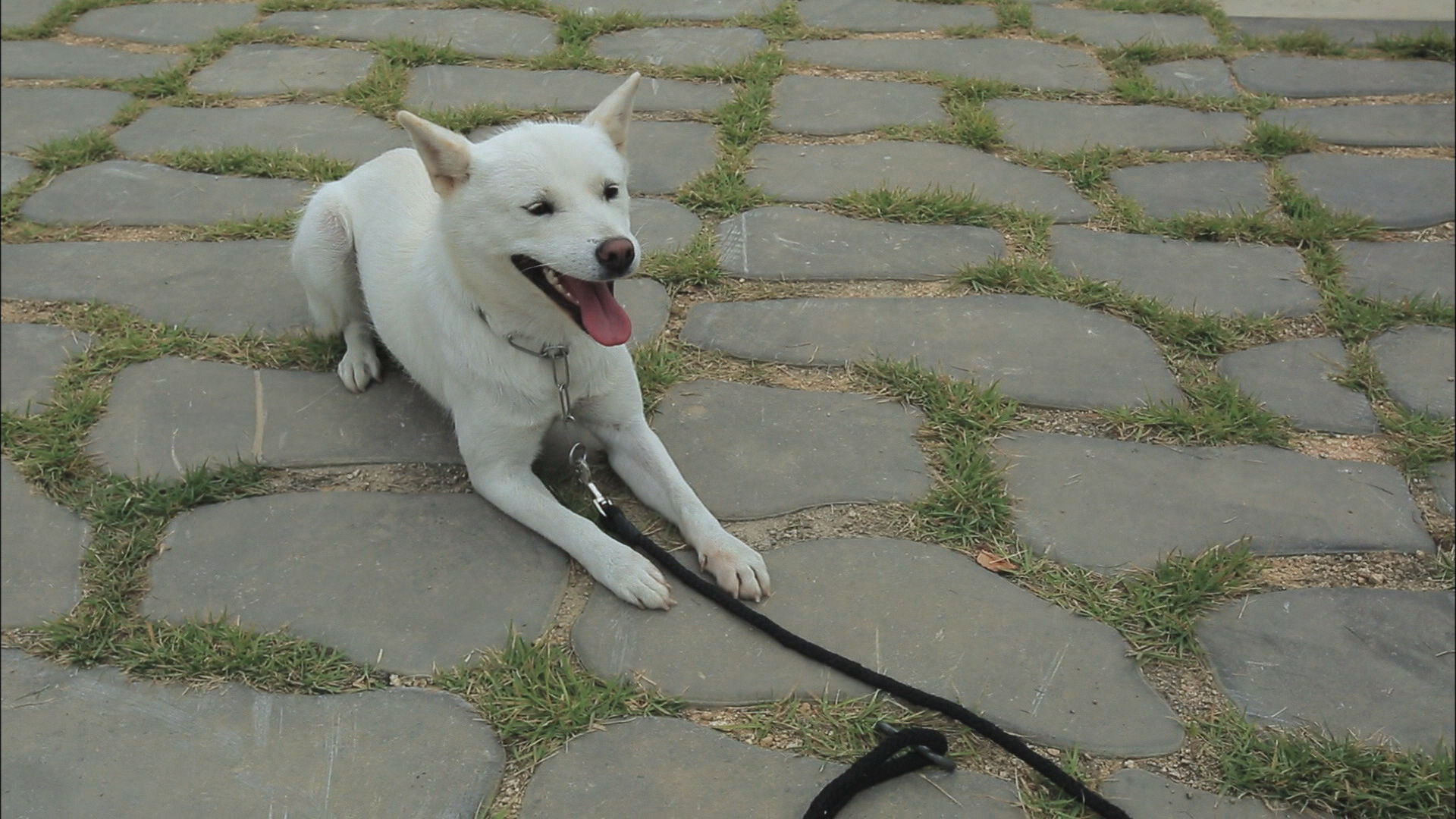
- White Donggyeongi (Baekgu, 백구)
- Other names: Daeng gyeon (댕견); Donggyeong gae (동경개)
- Origin: Gyeongju, South Korea

The Donggyeongi (Korean: 동경이), also called daeng gyeon (댕견) or Donggyeong gae (동경개), is a naturally bob-tailed dog breed that originated in Korea. It is an endangered breed of some 600 dogs in total and has been protected as Natural Monument No. 540 since it was designated on 6 November 2012.

== Etymology ==
Donggyeong (동경; 東京) was the name of the capital city of Silla, a medieval Korean dynasty. Today, the city is known as Gyeongju.

== Appearance ==
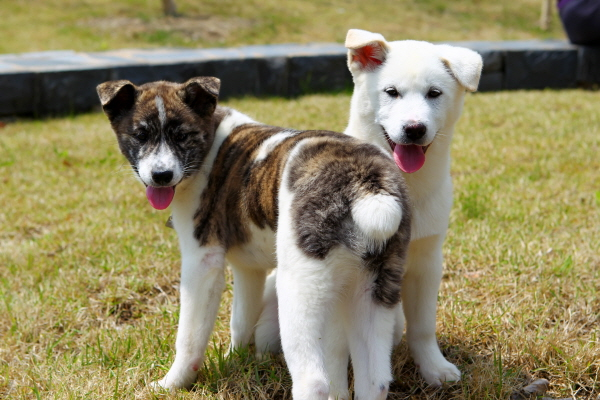
Two puppy Donggyeongi.

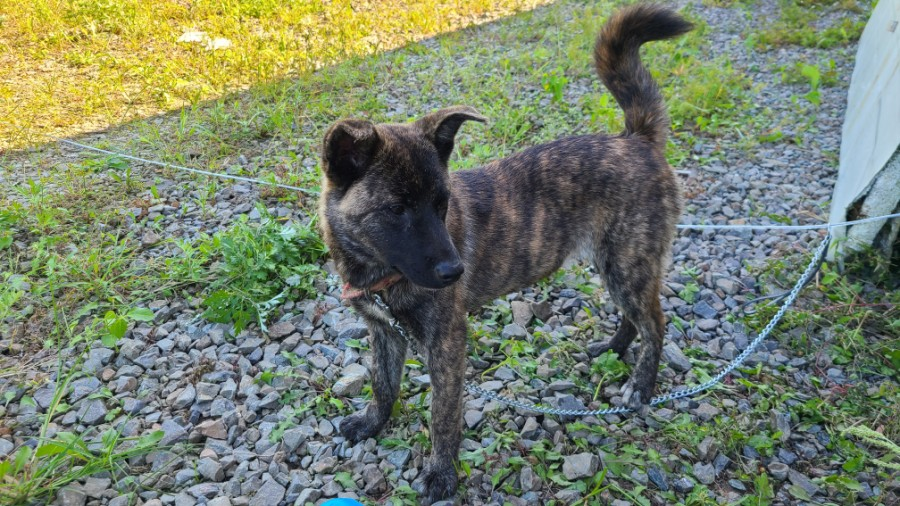
Donggyeongi with tiger-pattern (Hogu, 호구)

The Donggyeongi has a very short or no tail, which is a prominent characteristic distinguished from other dog breeds in Korea. The Donggyeongi's facial features are similar to those of another dog type, the Korean Jindo, which is also a natural heritage dog in South Korea.

== History ==
DNA analysis indicates that the Donggyeongi and the Korean Jindo were separated from a common ancestor about 900 years ago.

The feature of Donggyeongi was mentioned in old records such as Donggyeong Jabgi 《동경잡기(東京雜記)》(1845), Jeungbomunhyunbigo 《증보문헌비고(增補文獻備考)》(1770), and was also found in the clay dog dolls from the sixth century excavated around Gyeongju.

In the past, there was a large population of Donggyeongi in Gyeongju, but the dogs were slaughtered during the Japanese colonial era (1910-1945). There is an allegation that they might have been killed due to their similarity to ‘Komainu’, the dog figures kept in Japanese royal palaces or shrines. During the period, the number of dogs such as the Donggyeongi, the Jindo, and the Sapsali decreased as they were slaughtered en masse to use their skins for winter coats.

Even after the Korean liberation in 1945, the situation in Donggyeongi was not good. The dogs were despised by the general public: their lack of tails was regarded as bringing bad luck, or the dogs were mistaken as deformed. The number of Donggyeongi drastically decreased as a result. Hybridization with other breeds worsened the situation. Once the misunderstanding about their short tails had been cleared up, breed preservation efforts began and the dogs were designated a national heritage.

== See also ==
- Old English Sheepdog
- Korean Jindo
- Sapsali
- Nureongi
