= Skinner's Big Idea =

1928 film

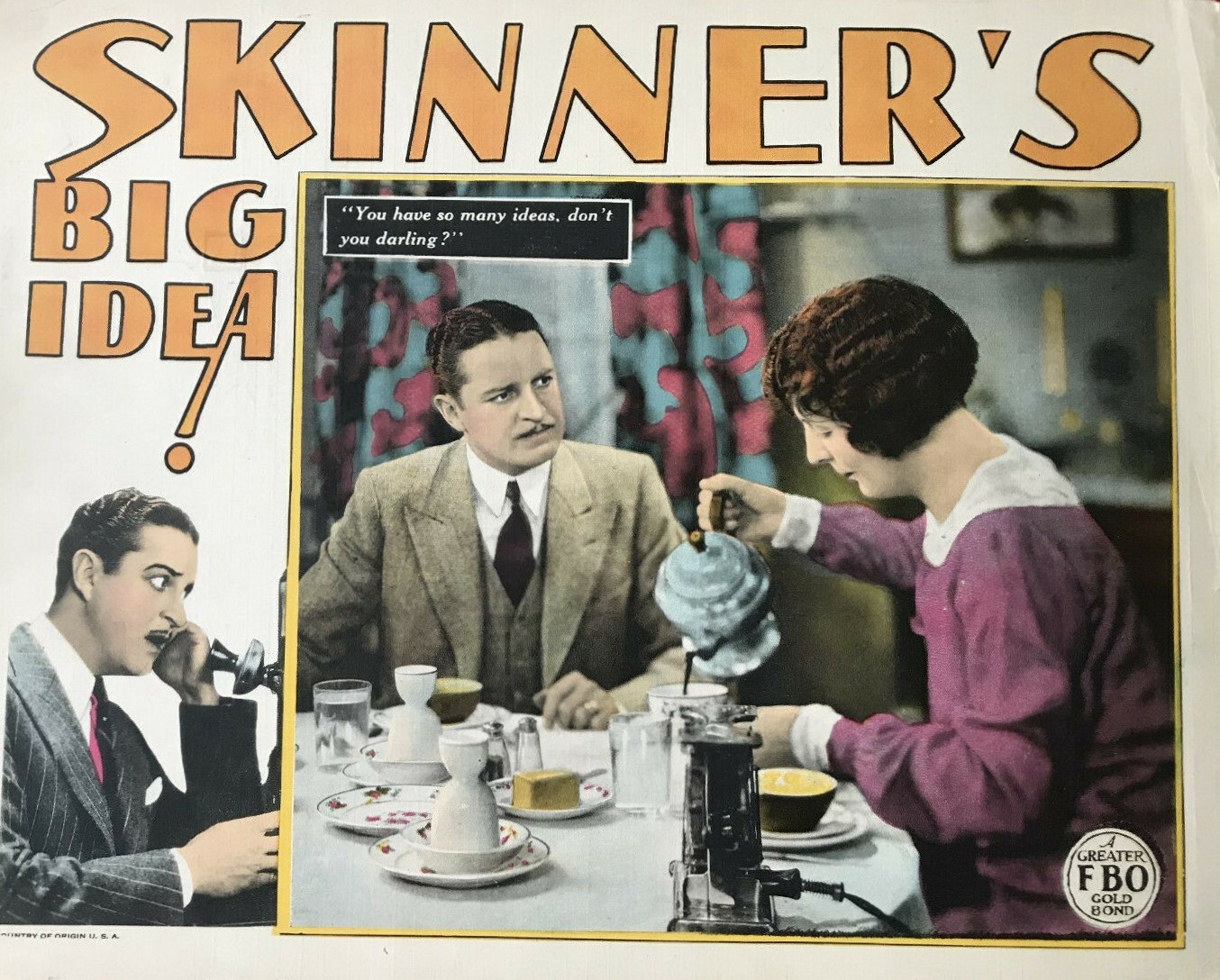
- Directed by: Lynn Shores
- Screenplay by: Matt Taylor; Randolph Bartlett
- Based on: Skinner's Big Idea by Henry Irving Dodge
- Starring: Bryant Washburn; William Orlamond; James Bradbury Sr. Robert Dudley; Ole M. Ness; Charles Wellesley
- Cinematography: Philip Tannura
- Edited by: Archie Marshek
- Production company: Film Booking Offices of America
- Distributed by: Film Booking Offices of America
- Release date: April 24, 1928
- Running time: 70 minutes
- Country: United States
- Language: English

Skinner's Big Idea is a lost 1928 American comedy film directed by Lynn Shores and written by Matt Taylor and Randolph Bartlett. It is based on the 1918 novel Skinner's Big Idea by Henry Irving Dodge. The film stars Bryant Washburn, William Orlamond, James Bradbury Sr., Robert Dudley, Ole M. Ness and Charles Wellesley. The film was released on April 24, 1928, by Film Booking Offices of America.

== Cast ==
- Bryant Washburn as Skinner
- William Orlamond as Hemingway
- James Bradbury Sr. as Carlton
- Robert Dudley as Gibbs
- Ole M. Ness as Perkins
- Charles Wellesley as McLaughlin
- Martha Sleeper as Dorothy
- Hugh Trevor as Jack McLaughlin
- Ethel Grey Terry as Mrs. Skinner

== Preservation ==
With no holdings found in archives, Skinner's Big Idea is considered a lost film.
