= Henry Irving Dodge =

American writer

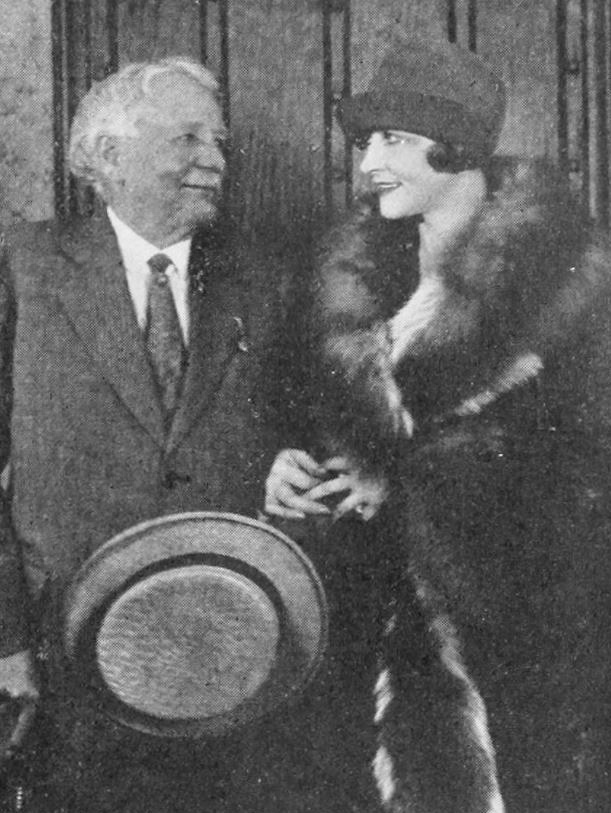
Dodge and actress Anna Q. Nilsson in 1927

Henry Irving Dodge (April 11, 1861 in Kasoag, New York- July 28, 1934) was an American writer. He was best known for creating the character "Skinner" which appeared in Skinner's Dress Suit and a number of additional stories in the 1910s.

Dodge was a great-nephew of Washington Irving and grandson of Major General Richard Henry Dodge who fought in the American Revolution and War of 1812. He was born in Oswego County, New York. He studied engineering and law, but preferred writing, and worked for newspapers and magazines. He did not publish his first novels until he was 45.

In 1916, his story Skinner's Dress Suit was published in The Saturday Evening Post, featuring the character William Manning Skinner, and he continued writing Skinner stories to meet public demand, including Skinner's Baby, Skinner's Big Idea, and Skinner Makes It Fashionable in 1920. A few Skinner films based on his works were made in the 1910s and 1920s, e.g., Skinner's Baby (1917) and Skinner's Dress Suit (in both 1917 and 1926). Dodge also wrote plays.

His World War I story "The Yellow Dog" inspired editorials and the formation of anti-sedition groups. Members of these Anti-Yellow Dog Clubs (largely schoolboys) wielded his definition ("If a man talks against the government and can't back up what he says, he's a 'yellow dog'.") There were thousands of these clubs across the US, and they were the target of both support and scorn.

Dodge married Margaret Small (1873–1968) in 1902. Dodge died in New York City on July 28, 1934, of angina. Though his death merited an obituary with photograph in The New York Times, his work has not drawn much attention since his death.

== Filmography ==
- Skinner's Dress Suit (1917)
- Skinner's Baby (1917)
- The Yellow Dog (1918)
- Skinner's Dress Suit (1926)
- The Thirteenth Juror (1927)
- A Trick of Hearts (1928)
- Skinner's Big Idea (1928)
- Skinner Steps Out (1929)
