= The Yellow Dog (1918 film) =

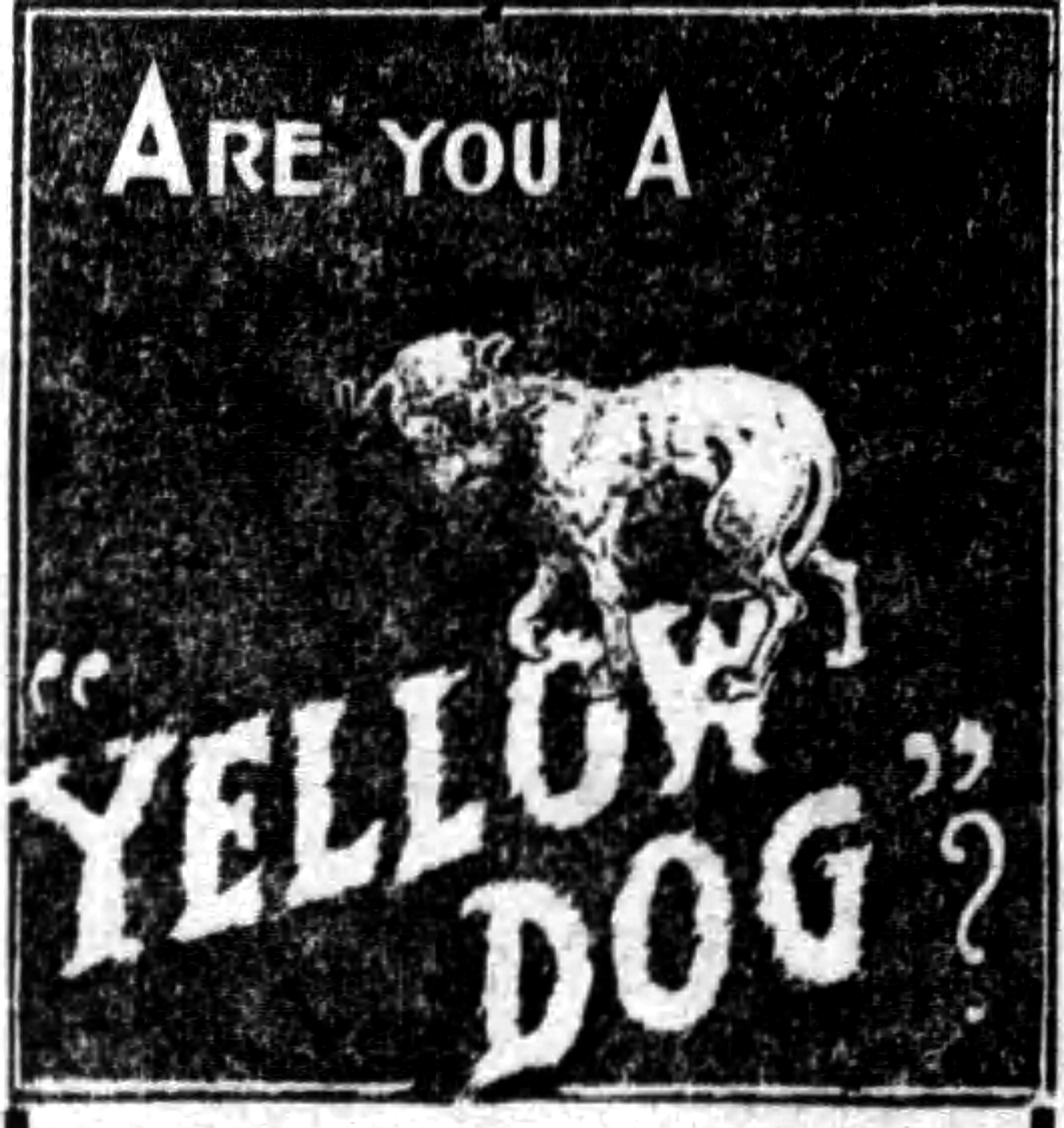
- Directed by: Colin Campbell
- Written by: Elliott J. Clawson; Henry Irving Dodge
- Starring: Arthur Hoyt; Antrim Short; Clara Horton
- Cinematography: Harry Neumann
- Production company: Universal Pictures
- Distributed by: Universal Pictures
- Release date: September 1, 1918
- Running time: 60 minutes
- Country: United States
- Language: Silent (English intertitles)

The Yellow Dog is a 1918 American silent drama film directed by Colin Campbell and starring Arthur Hoyt, Antrim Short, and Clara Horton.

== Cast ==
- Arthur Hoyt as Albert Walker
- Antrim Short as 'Nosey' White
- Clara Horton as Kate Cummings
- Frank Clark as Alexander Cummings
- Will Machin as Karl Schneider
- Frank Hayes as Jones
- Fred Kelsey as Max Kummich
- Fred Starr as Henry Babbitt
- Ruby Lafayette as Mrs. Blakely
- Ralph Graves as Tom Blakely
- Lillian Clark as Tom's Sweetheart
- Charles M. Schwab

== Promotion ==
Promotion on the film began before production started. Movie theaters distributed material promoting the Anti-Yellow Dog Clubs, groups designed for schoolboys to call out Americans not acting with sufficient patriotism that had originally been inspired by the story that this film adapts.

== Reception ==
Mae Tinée in the Chicago Tribune said "There's such a big idea behind 'The Yellow Dog,' that it's rather a pity the picture is not a more complete and masterly thing than it is." The Evening Express (Los Angeles) said that it had a "terrific climax" and that the "subtitles are gems of 'punch' and patriotism".

== Bibliography ==
- Donald W. McCaffrey & Christopher P. Jacobs. Guide to the Silent Years of American Cinema. Greenwood Publishing, 1999. ISBN 0-313-30345-2
