= Anti-Yellow Dog Club =

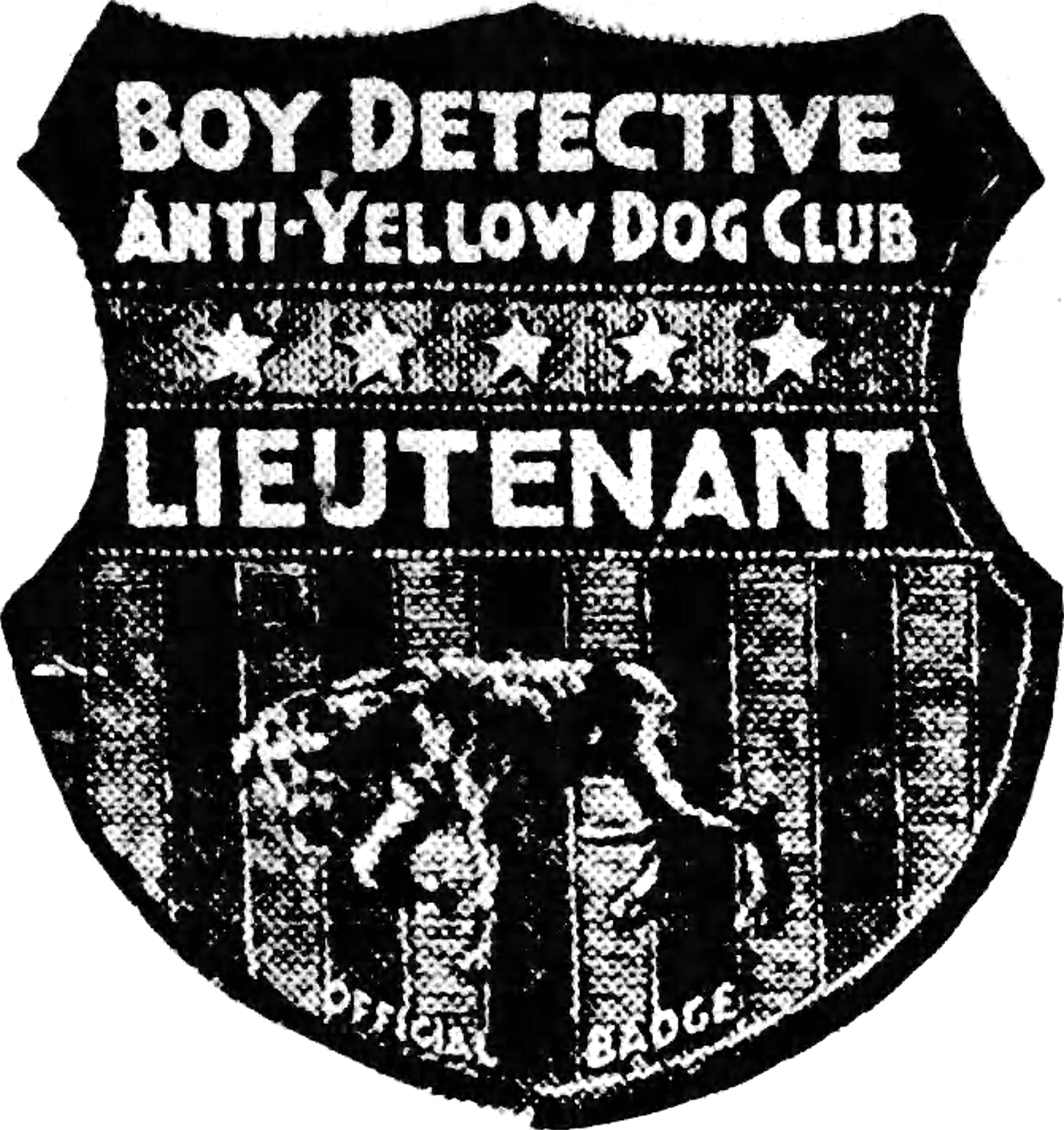
Badge for members of Anti-Yellow Dog Clubs

The Anti-Yellow Dog Clubs (also referred to as The Yellow Dog Clubbers Club) were American anti-seditionist clubs during World War I inspired by Henry Irving Dodge's story "The Yellow Dog", which first appeared in The Saturday Evening Post on March 4, 1918. Members of these clubs (largely schoolboys) wielded the story's definition ("If a man talks against the government and can't back up what he says, he's a 'yellow dog'.") on their quest to confront "yellow dogs". There were thousands of these clubs across the US, and they were the target of both support and scorn. Total membership was in the millions. The clubs were endorsed by political figures including Theodore Roosevelt. They were promoted in concert with both the book edition of the story and its movie adaptation. Movie theater owners started promoting the clubs before production on the film had even started, as an advance publicity campaign.

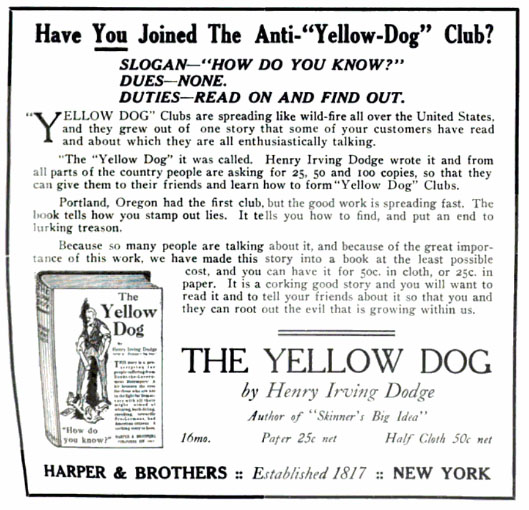
Publishers' Weekly ad promoting the club as well as the book editions of the story that inspired them
