= Sapsali =

Korean dog breed

Sapsal
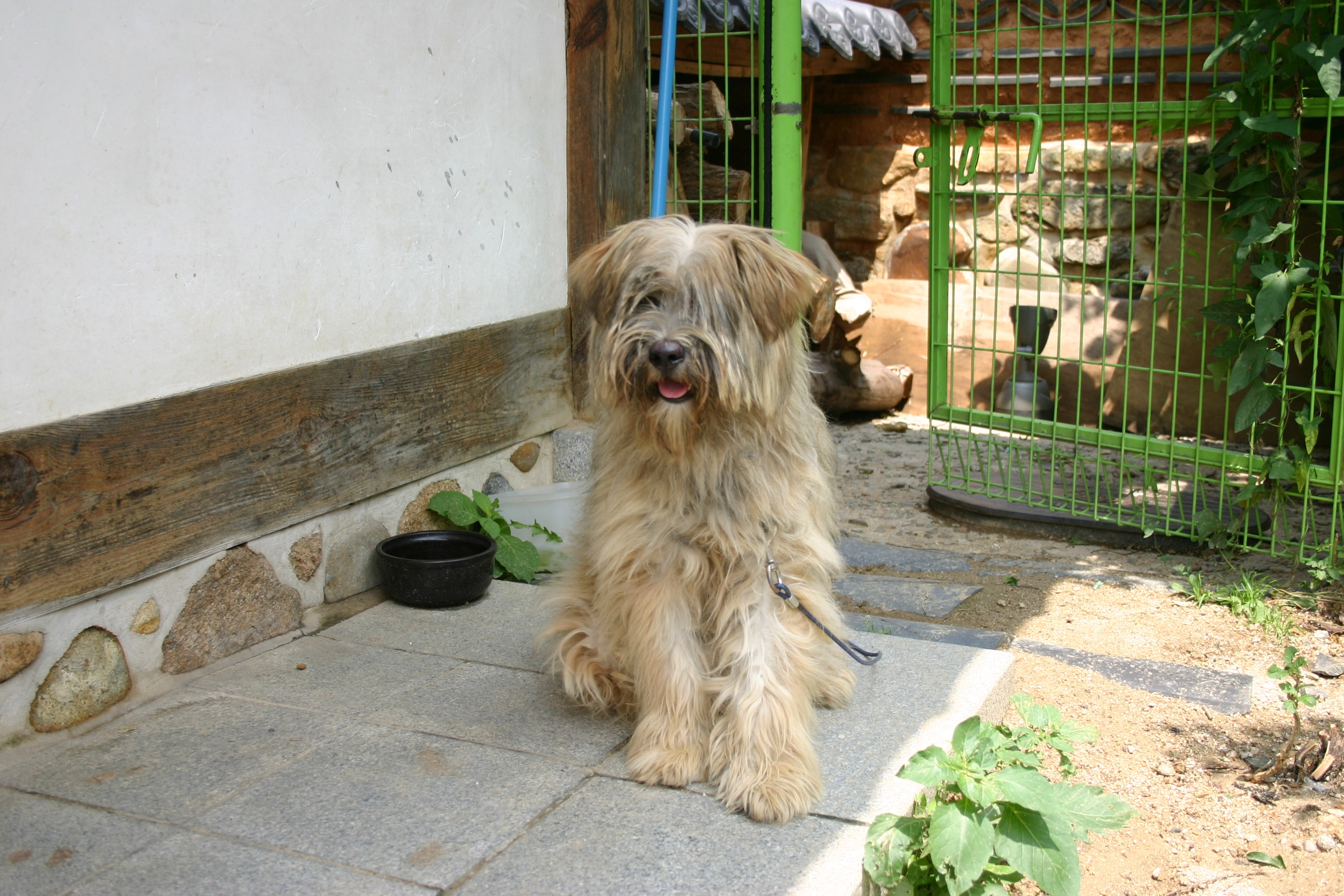
- Other names: Sapsal Gae; Sapsaree
- Origin: South Korea
- Breed status: Not recognized as a breed by any major kennel club.

The Sapsal (also Sapsali/Sapsari or Sapsalgae; Korean: 삽살이) is a shaggy-haired South Korean breed of dog that is said to ward off evil spirits. In the Korean language, the word Sapsal is followed by either gae (개, meaning "dog") or the nominative particle i (이), and may occasionally be romanized as Sapsaree. The breed was designated as one of the natural monuments of South Korea in 1992 to receive protected status and funding for its preservation as a part of South Korea's cultural heritage. The breed is officially recognized by the Korean Kennel Federation.

== Description ==
The height of the male is 51 cm and the female is 49 cm, and the body is covered with long, thick fur which protects them from the cold. The dog may be any of several colors, either solid or mixed:

- Black
- Gold
- Orange
- Brown
- Grey
- Blue
- White

The ears lie down, and the snout is relatively blunt and not pointed like a Jindo dog. Its tail is raised and its head is large, so its shape resembles that of a lion. Its personality is bold and valiant, loyal to its owner.

== History ==
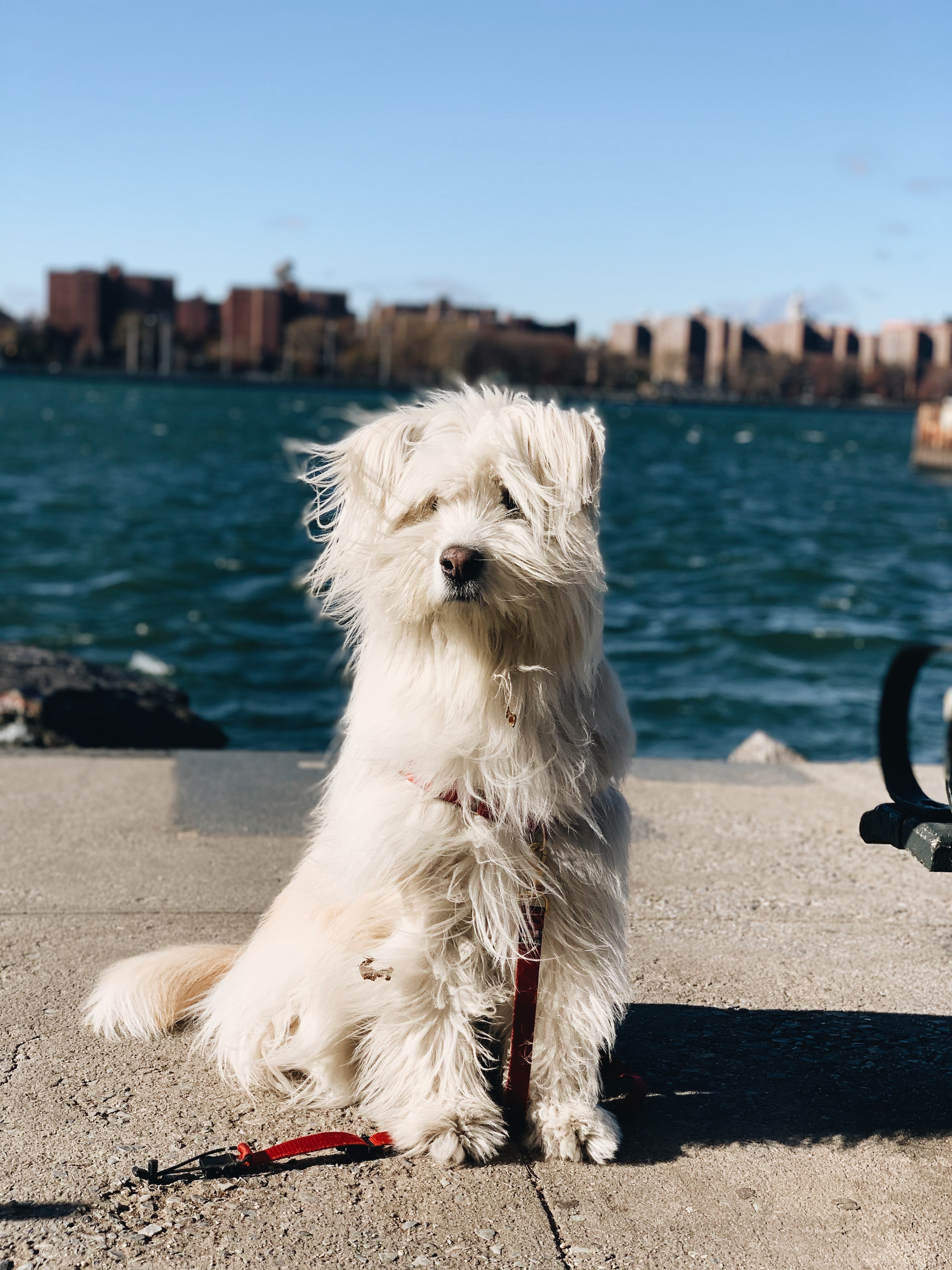
Korean Sapsali (Female, 65 lbs, 6 yrs old) from the Chungju Lake area, South Korea

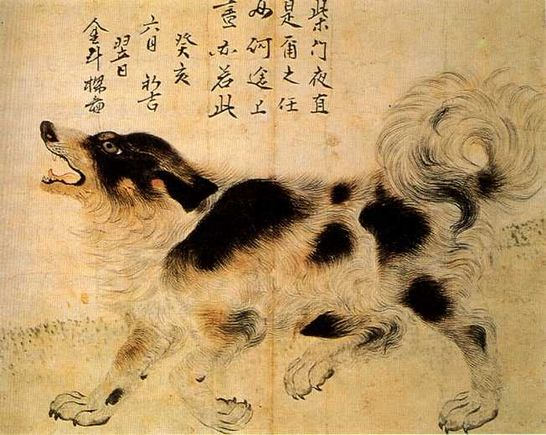
A short-haired type of Sapsalgae painted by Kim Doo Ryang in late Joseon Dynasty, 1743

The breed's name Sapsalgae means "a dog that chases away evil spirits and misfortune", and it appears frequently in lyrics, folktales, and paintings. They are nicknamed "Ghost Hunters" or "Sunshine Dogs" for their supernatural qualities, or "Lion Dogs" for their appearance having large paws and shaggy fur.

Sapsali dogs date back to the Three Kingdoms period around 220 A.D. - 280 A.D. They were mainly bred as companions for aristocrats during the Silla period, but were owned by common people after the collapse of Unified Silla. A 300-year-old stone memorial in southeastern South Korea tells the story of an aristocrat who fell asleep on a riverbank after having too many drinks. Embers from his pipe started a brush fire as he slept, and his faithful Sapsali jumped into the river and used its wet fur to douse the fire and save its master at the cost of its own life.

The breed was slaughtered in large numbers by the Japanese when Korea was under Japanese rule to make winter coats for its military in Manchuria. In the late 1960s, professors at Kyungpook National University collected about 30 Sapsali dogs in an effort to preserve the breed, but the dogs were near extinction by the mid-1980s with only eight dogs remaining. The breed was revived by geneticist Dr. Ha Ji-hong, who used DNA methods to reestablish the breed and weed out congenital issues. In 1992 the breed was designated as one of the Natural Monuments of South Korea, receiving protected status and funding for its preservation as a part of Korean cultural heritage.

The breed's population currently numbers in the thousands, and they are commonly found as household pets and therapy dogs due to their gentle temperament, loyal nature, and friendliness. A Sapsali dog was chosen as the mascot of the 2011 World Championships in Athletics in Daegu.

== See also ==
- List of dog breeds
- Donggyeongi
- Jindo
- Pungsan
