= Nureongi =

Korean Yellow Spitz dog breed

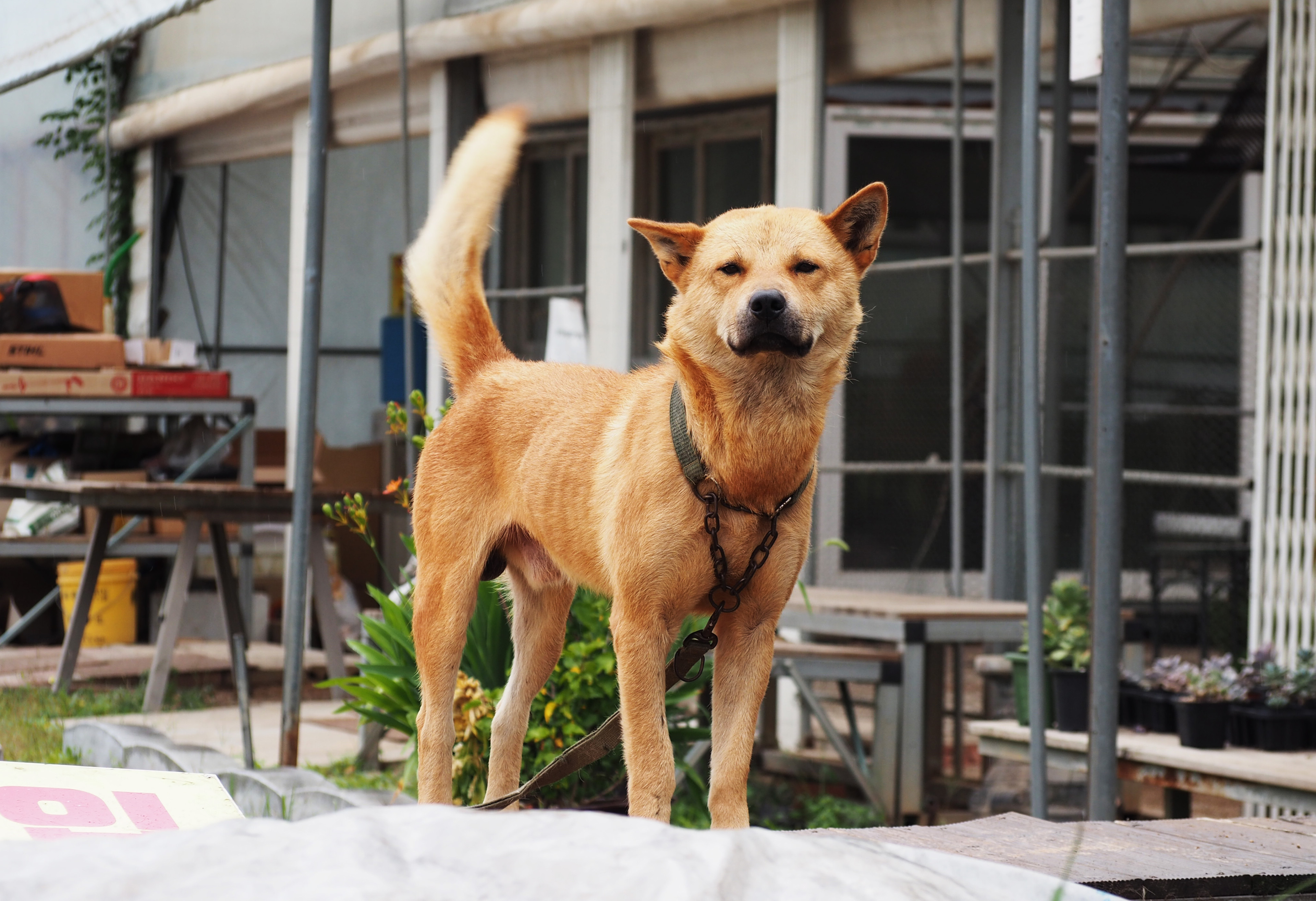
- Other names: Korean Edible Dog; Korean Yellow Spitz; Hwanggu
- Origin: South Korea
Traits
- Color: yellow, gold

- Nureongi
- Hangul: 누렁이
- RR: nureongi
- MR: nurŏngi

Alternate name
- Hangul: 황구
- Hanja: 黃狗
- RR: hwanggu
- MR: hwanggu

The Nureongi (Korean: 누렁이; lit. 'yellow one'), also known as the Korean Yellow Spitz or Hwanggu (황구; 黃狗; lit. 'yellow dog'), is a common, spitz-type dog with yellowish coloring endemic to the Korean peninsula.

It is the primary dog-breed raised in Korea for meat.
